= From Moscow to Mars =

Box set by Erasure
- Released: 9 December 2016
- Recorded: 1985–2016
- Genre: Pop; synth-pop; electronic
- Label: Mute
- Producer: Various

Erasure chronology
Always: The Very Best of Erasure (2015)	From Moscow to Mars (2016)	World Be Gone (2017)

Erasure box set chronology
EBX (1999)	From Moscow to Mars (2016)

From Moscow to Mars is a retrospective box set from Erasure, released in the UK by Mute Records on 9 December 2016. The set commemorates the 30th anniversary of the group's founding, and contains an assortment of previously released and never before released material. Its name is derived from a lyric found within the group's single "Star", "We go waiting for the stars to come showering down... From Moscow to Mars...Universe falling down". The 22 remixes, 19 rarities and 17 live recordings included in the box set were released on digital platforms worldwide on 10 May 2019.

== Contents ==
The box set contains 12 audio CDs, one DVD, an exclusive photobook, photographs, a postcard set and a "space passport". Three of the CDs contain the group's singles in chronological order. Two contain personal selections, one each from Vince and Andy, of their favourite tracks, and are a selection of singles and album tracks. Two contain a selection of most of their B-sides, as selected by members of the official Fan Club, the "Erasure Information Service". Two contain a selection of remixes, some previously released and some specially commissioned for this release. One contains a selection of live performances, one has a selection of demos and unreleased tracks, and the final CD contains an "audio documentary" entitled "A Little Respect – 30 Years of Erasure". The final disc is a region-free NTSC DVD of the Wild! concert recording previously issued on VHS and Laserdisc, available here on DVD for the first time.

== Release ==
From Moscow to Mars was originally scheduled to be released in mid-November 2016, and was made available for pre-order from Lexer Music and Pledge Music on 2 September 2016. Those who pre-ordered also received six digital download tracks which do not otherwise appear in the box set. The box set was eventually released on 9 December 2016.

A pre-release party was arranged in Birmingham on 4 November 2016 running between 2:30pm and 11:30pm

== Reception ==
Professional ratings
Review scores
Source	Rating
This Is Not Retro	5/5 stars
XS Noize	Positive

The first pre-release reviews appeared during the second week of November 2016 and were very positive.

== Track listing ==
CD 1: Singles
No.	Title	Featured on	Length
1.	"Who Needs Love Like That"	Wonderland (1985)	3:06
2.	"Heavenly Action"	Wonderland (1985)	3:29
3.	"Oh L'amour"	Wonderland (1985)	3:08
4.	"Sometimes"	The Circus (1987)	3:39
5.	"It Doesn't Have to Be"	The Circus (1987)	4:06
6.	"Victim of Love"	The Circus (1987)	3:38
7.	"The Circus"	The Circus (1987)	4:06
8.	"Ship of Fools"	The Innocents (1988)	4:02
9.	"Chains of Love"	The Innocents (1988)	3:42
10.	"A Little Respect"	The Innocents (1988)	3:31
11.	"Stop!"	Crackers International EP (1988)	2:56
12.	"Drama!"	Wild! (1989)	4:06
13.	"You Surround Me"	Wild! (1989)	3:59
14.	"Blue Savannah"	Wild! (1989)	4:20
15.	"Star"	Wild! (1989)	3:39
16.	"Chorus"	Chorus (1991)	4:29

CD 2: Singles
No.	Title	Featured on	Length
1.	"Love to Hate You"	Chorus (1991)	3:58
2.	"Am I Right?"	Chorus (1991)	4:18
3.	"Breath of Life"	Chorus (1991)	3:56
4.	"Take a Chance on Me"	Abba-esque EP (1992)	3:46
5.	"Always"	I Say I Say I Say (1994)	4:02
6.	"Run to the Sun"	I Say I Say I Say (1994)	4:12
7.	"I Love Saturday"	I Say I Say I Say (1994)	4:01
8.	"Stay with Me"	Erasure (1995)	4:44
9.	"Fingers & Thumbs (Cold Summer's Day)"	Erasure (1995)	4:24
10.	"Rock Me Gently"	Erasure (1995)	4:07
11.	"In My Arms"	Cowboy (1997)	3:29
12.	"Don't Say Your Love Is Killing Me"	Cowboy (1997)	3:49
13.	"Rain" (Al Stone Mix)	Cowboy (1997)	4:09
14.	"Freedom"	Loveboat (2000)	2:54
15.	"Moon & the Sky" (JC's Heaven Scent Radio Re-Work)	Loveboat (2000)	4:15
16.	"Solsbury Hill"	Other People's Songs (2003)	4:18
17.	"Make Me Smile (Come Up and See Me)"	Other People's Songs (2003)	3:28

CD 3: Singles
No.	Title	Featured on	Length
1.	"Breathe"	Nightbird (2005)	3:49
2.	"Don't Say You Love Me"	Nightbird (2005)	3:44
3.	"Here I Go Impossible Again"	Nightbird (2005)	3:27
4.	"All This Time Still Falling Out of Love"	Nightbird (2005)	4:15
5.	"Boy" (Acoustic)	Union Street (2006)	3:50
6.	"I Could Fall in Love with You"	Light at the End of the World (2007)	4:02
7.	"Sunday Girl"	Light at the End of the World (2007)	3:15
8.	"Storm in a Teacup"	Light at the End of the World (2007)	3:28
9.	"Sucker for Love"	Light at the End of the World (2007)	3:32
10.	"When I Start To (Break It All Down)"	Tomorrow's World (2011)	3:33
11.	"Be with You"	Tomorrow's World (2011)	3:34
12.	"Fill Us with Fire"	Tomorrow's World (2011)	3:18
13.	"Gaudete"	Snow Globe (2013)	2:44
14.	"Make It Wonderful"	Snow Globe (2013)	3:04
15.	"Elevation"	The Violet Flame (2014)	3:37
16.	"Reason"	The Violet Flame (2014)	3:13
17.	"Sacred"	The Violet Flame (2014)	3:30

CD 4: Andy's Personal Favourites
No.	Title	Featured on	Length
1.	"Fill Us with Fire"	Tomorrow's World (2011)	3:17
2.	"Save Me Darling"	Cowboy (1997)	4:01
3.	"Fly Away"	Light at the End of the World (2007)	3:21
4.	"Here I Go Impossible Again"	Nightbird (2005)	3:42
5.	"Witch in the Ditch"	The Innocents (1988)	3:44
6.	"Miracle"	I Say I Say I Say (1994)	4:13
7.	"Siren Song"	Chorus (1991)	4:45
8.	"Mad as We Are"	Loveboat (2000)	3:52
9.	"Boy" (Acoustic)	Union Street (2006)	3:49
10.	"Joan"	Chorus (1991)	3:51
11.	"I Bet You're Mad at Me"	Nightbird (2005)	4:01
12.	"Golden Heart"	Light at the End of the World (2007)	3:13
13.	"A Long Goodbye"	Erasure (1995)	5:34
14.	"What Will I Say When You're Gone?"	Tomorrow's World (2011)	3:43
15.	"Brother and Sister"	Wild! (1989)	3:26
16.	"A Whole Lotta Love Run Riot"	Tomorrow's World (2011)	3:46

CD 5: Vince's Personal Favourites
No.	Title	Featured on	Length
1.	"Sono Luminus"	Erasure (1995)	7:53
2.	"Because You're So Sweet"	I Say I Say I Say (1994)	4:19
3.	"Love Affair"	Cowboy (1997)	3:38
4.	"Home"	Chorus (1991)	4:14
5.	"Alien"	Loveboat (2000)	4:32
6.	"Precious"	Cowboy (1997)	3:33
7.	"Don't Dance"	The Circus (1987)	3:37
8.	"How My Eyes Adore You"	Light at the End of the World (2007)	3:20
9.	"Boy"	Cowboy (1997)	3:41
10.	"Blues Away"	I Say I Say I Say (1994)	5:03
11.	"Spiralling" (Acoustic)	Union Street (2006)	2:28
12.	"Piano Song"	Wild! (1989)	3:16
13.	"Tenderest Moments" (Acoustic)	Union Street (2006)	5:16
14.	"Everybody's Got to Learn Sometime"	Other People's Songs (2003)	3:20
15.	"Cry So Easy"	Wonderland (1985)	3:37
16.	"You've Got to Save Me Right Now"	Tomorrow's World (2011)	2:53
17.	"Weight of the World"	The Innocents (1988)	3:39

CD 6: B-Sides
No.	Title	Featured on	Length
1.	"Supernature"	You Surround Me	5:45
2.	"The Hardest Part"	Crackers International EP	3:38
3.	"When I Needed You"	Ship of Fools	3:59
4.	"She Won't Be Home"	Crackers International EP	3:28
5.	"Knocking on Your Door"	Crackers International EP	2:56
6.	"Don't Suppose"	Chains of Love	3:28
7.	"Gimme! Gimme! Gimme!"	Oh L'amour	3:55
8.	"Over the Rainbow"	Chorus	3:29
9.	"Waiting for Sex"	Am I Right? EP	4:05
10.	"Tenderest Moments"	Run to the Sun	5:28
11.	"March on Down the Line"	Oh L'amour	3:45
12.	"Dreamlike State"	Star	3:26
13.	"The Soldier's Return"	Victim of Love	3:06
14.	"Heart of Glass" (Live in Oxford)	Don't Say Your Love Is Killing Me	4:58
15.	"Let It Flow"	Am I Right? EP	4:21
16.	"Runaround on the Underground"	Blue Savannah	3:23
17.	"Rapture"	In My Arms	5:14
18.	"Paradise"	Drama	4:10

CD 7: B-Sides
No.	Title	Featured on	Length
1.	"La La La"	Love to Hate You	4:12
2.	"Truly, Madly, Deeply"	I Love Saturday EP	4:26
3.	"Like Zsa Zsa Zsa Gabor"	A Little Respect	4:01
4.	"Sweet, Sweet Baby"	Drama	4:18
5.	"True Love Wars"	Stay with Me	4:08
6.	"Ghost"	I Love Saturday EP	6:13
7.	"Hi NRG"	Fingers & Thumbs (Cold Summer's Day)	5:53
8.	"The Good, the Bad and the Ugly"	Chains of Love	3:22
9.	"In the Name of the Heart"	In My Arms	3:50
10.	"Die 4 Love"	Reason	3:32
11.	"Tragic"	I Love Saturday EP (vocal) / Always (instrumental)	4:20
12.	"First Contact"	Rain	6:04
13.	"Love Is Colder Than Death"	A Little Respect	2:11
14.	"Don't Say No"	Heavenly Action	3:46
15.	"In the Hall of the Mountain King"	It Doesn't Have to Be	2:34
16.	"No G.D.M"	Blue Savannah	4:06
17.	"Take Me on a Highway"	Sunday Girl	3:21
18.	"Tomorrow's World"	When I Start To (Break It All Down)	4:15

CD 8: Remixes
No.	Title	Featured on	Length
1.	"A Little Respect" (Extended Mix)	A Little Respect single (12" and CD)	6:39
2.	"Waiting for the Day" (Vince Clarke Remix)		4:41
3.	"Supernature" (William Orbit Remix)	You Surround Me single (Limited 12" only)
4.	"Blue Savannah" (Little Boots Remix)	New for this release	4:57
5.	"S.O.S" (Perimeter Mix)	Abba-esque The Remixes EP
6.	"Love to Hate You" (Bruce Forest Remix)	Love to Hate You single (US CD only)
7.	"Snappy" (The Spice has Risen Mix)	Chorus single (12" and US CD)
8.	"Ship of Fools" (Nicka & Asle's Stella Polaris Remix)		7:52
9.	"The Circus" (The "Equalateral" Mix)		9:35
10.	"Elevation" (Jack Antonoff Remix)	The Violet Flame Remixes Record Store Day EP	3:28
11.	"Stay with Me" (Guitar Mix)	Stay with Me single (12", 2nd CD and US CD)

CD 9: Remixes
No.	Title	Featured on	Length
1.	"Stop" (12" Remix)	Crackers International EP (12", 'Part 2' CD and US CD)	5:47
2.	"I Could Fall in Love with You" (Jeremy Wheatley Extended 12" mix)	I Could Fall in Love with You single (UK maxi-CD and US CD)	5:59
3.	"Always" ('Always in Motion' mix)		6:20
4.	"Blue Savannah" ('Out of the Blue' Mix)	Blue Savannah promotional 12" and CD	6:46
5.	"Oh L'Amour" (Almighty Remix)		6:31
6.	"Chorus" (Aggressive Trance Mix)	Chorus single (US CD only)	8:51
7.	"Heavenly Action" (Matt Pop's Planet Cupid Mix)		5:36
8.	"Breath of Life" (Joey Beltram Mix)	Breath of Life single (12" and CD, as Umbilical Mix)	4:29
9.	"You Surround Me" (Syrinx Mix)	You Surround Me single (12" and CD)	7:17
10.	"If I Could" (Japanese Mix)	Victim of Love single (Limited 12" only)	3:40
11.	"Rock Me Gently" (A Combination of Special Events)	Rock Me Gently single (Czech 12" and CD)	10:49

CD 10: Erasure Live!
No.	Title	Length
1.	"Victim of Love" (The Circus Tour 1987)
2.	"Knocking on Your Door" (The Erasure Show 2005)
3.	"A Whole Lotta Love Run Riot" (Tomorrow's World Tour 2011)
4.	"Joan" (The Phantasmagorical Entertainment Tour 1992)
5.	"Witch in the Ditch" (The Innocents Tour 1988)
6.	"I Bet You're Mad at Me" (The Erasure Show 2005)
7.	"Home" (The Phantasmagorical Entertainment Tour 1992)
8.	"Spiralling" (The Innocents Tour 1988)
9.	"Sunday Girl" (Light at the End of the World Tour 2007)
10.	"Don't Say Your Love Is Killing Me" (An Evening with Erasure 1997)
11.	"Breathe" (The Erasure Show 2005)
12.	"Sometimes" (The Innocents Tour 1988)
13.	"Tenderest Moments" (The Acoustic Tour 2006)
14.	"Ave Maria" (The Erasure Show 2005)
15.	"The Soldier's Return" (The Phantasmagorical Entertainment Tour 1992)
16.	"I Could Fall in Love with You" (Light at the End of the World Tour 2007)
17.	"A Little Respect" (The Innocents Tour 1988)

CD 11: Rarities
No.	Title	Period	Length
1.	"Who Needs Love Like That?" (Audition Version)	Original Andy Bell recording from 1985	2:46
2.	"Blue (Searching)" (Demo)	Early version of 'Searching'. Final appears on Solsbury Hill single	4:11
3.	"Piano" (Demo)	Unused piece from Tomorrow's World era	2:23
4.	"Waiting for the Day" (Demo)	Early version. Final appears on Chorus album	3:41
5.	"Siempre" (Always Spanish Version)	Original appears on I Say I Say I Say album	3:54
6.	"2,000 Miles" (Monteverde 7" Mix)	Unreleased mix. Original appears on Wild! album	3:28
7.	"Chanson" (Moon & the Sky French Demo)	Early version. Final appears on Loveboat album	4:16
8.	"Am I Right?" (Guitar Demo)	Early version. Final appears on Chorus album	1:56
9.	"Worlds on Fire" (Demo)	Early version. Final appears on Cowboy album	3:23
10.	"Run to the Sun" (Demo)	Early version. Final appears on I Say I Say I Say album	2:47
11.	"Breath of Life" (Piano Demo)	Early version. Final appears on Chorus album	0:30
12.	"Alien" (Demo)	Early version. Final appears on Loveboat album	4:01
13.	"A Whole Lotta Love Run Riot" (Demo)	Early version. Final appears on Tomorrow's World album	2:07
14.	"Moon & the Sky" (The Beatmasters Remix)	Unreleased mix. Original appears on Loveboat album	3:39
15.	"Untitled" (Loveboat Demo)	Early version of 'Here in My Heart'. Final appears on Loveboat album	3:03
16.	"Amo Odiarti" (Love to Hate You - Italian Disco Anthem Mix)	Original appears on Chorus album	3:55
17.	"UK Vibe 3" (Tomorrow's World Demo)	Unused piece from Tomorrow's World era	1:47
18.	"Symphony" (Unreleased track)	Unreleased. Previously available from Erasure Information Service	4:31
19.	"Reason" (Sirius XM Radio Session)	Original appears on The Violet Flame	3:29

CD 12: A Little Respect – 30 Years of Erasure
No.	Title	Length
1.	"Audio Documentary"

== DVD - The Wild! Tour ==
Released for the first time on DVD, this recording of Erasure's Wild! tour filmed in London in 1989 has previously only been available on VHS. It includes unreleased backstage footage. NTSC, region 0

== Preorder bonus ==
Those who pre-ordered the box set also received a digital download of the following tracks:

1. "Dreamlike State" (7" Alternative Mix)
2. "Sugar Hill" (Vox Mix)
3. "Heart of Stone" (Live)
4. "Then I Go Twisting" (Demo)
5. "Fingers & Thumbs" (Electrofinger Dub)
6. "Sacred" (Chris Cox Dub Mix)
