= Always: The Very Best of Erasure =

Greatest hits album by Erasure
- Released: 30 October 2015
- Genre: Synth-pop
- Length: 75:31
- Label: Mute

Erasure chronology
The Violet Flame (2014)	Always: The Very Best of Erasure (2015)	From Moscow to Mars (2016)

Always: The Very Best of Erasure is a compilation album released by English synth-pop duo Erasure. It was released on 30 October 2015 to commemorate their 30th anniversary since the formation of the band. The album contains all of the band's highest charting songs, as well as their more popular recordings. The deluxe edition contains two additional CDs with corresponding remixes, including some of their singles that did not make the compilation. It is available through Lexer Music, Amazon and iTunes. The band's members, Andy Bell and Vince Clarke, announced that this will kick off a campaign to celebrate their thirty years in the music industry together. The compilation followed the release of the first and only single from the album, entitled "Sometimes 2015", a re-vamped version of the original single mixed by David Wrench. The single was released on 23 October 2015, and contains a mixture of previously released remixes of Sometimes as well as a new remix by Love to Infinity.

== Track listing ==
All tracks are written by Andy Bell & Vince Clarke, unless otherwise noted.

Single disc & digital download
No.	Title	Writer(s)	Original Album	Length
1.	"Who Needs Love Like That"	Clarke	Wonderland (1986)	3:07
2.	"Oh L'amour"		Wonderland (1986)	3:07
3.	"Sometimes"		The Circus (1987)	3:39
4.	"Victim of Love"		The Circus (1987)	3:38
5.	"The Circus"		The Circus (1987)	4:06
6.	"Ship of Fools"		The Innocents (1988)	4:03
7.	"Chains of Love"		The Innocents (1988)	3:43
8.	"A Little Respect"		The Innocents (1988)	3:31
9.	"Stop!"		Crackers International (1988)	2:55
10.	"Drama!"		Wild! (1989)	4:05
11.	"Blue Savannah"		Wild! (1989)	4:19
12.	"Chorus"		Chorus (1991)	4:30
13.	"Love to Hate You"		Chorus (1991)	3:56
14.	"Take a Chance on Me"	Benny Andersson & Björn Ulvaeus	Abba-esque (1992)	3:56
15.	"Always"		I Say I Say I Say (1994)	4:02
16.	"Fingers & Thumbs (Cold Summer's Day)"		Erasure (1995)	4:23
17.	"Breathe"		Nightbird (2005)	3:48
18.	"Be with You"		Tomorrow's World (2011)	3:35
19.	"Elevation"		The Violet Flame (2014)	3:36
20.	"Sometimes" (2015)		Previously Unreleased	3:32
Total length:				75:31

Deluxe edition (disc two)
No.	Title	Writer(s)	Remixed by:	Length
1.	"Who Needs Love Like That" (Mexican Mix)	Clarke	Joseph Watt	6:07
2.	"Oh L'amour" (PWL Funky Sisters Say "Ooh La La")		The Funky Sisters	7:14
3.	"The Circus" (Grumbling Fur Eternal Eraser Mix)		Grumbling Fur	6:07
4.	"A Little Respect" (Big Train Mix)		Phil Legg	6:08
5.	"Stop!" (Vince Clarke Sync 82 Remix)		Clarke	6:03
6.	"Blue Savannah" (Der Deutsche Mix II)		Fisherman's Friends	6:15
7.	"Chorus" (Vegan Mix)		Moby	5:28
8.	"Love to Hate You" (LFO Modulated Filter Mix)		Mark Saunders	5:55
9.	"Always" (Microbots Inside Your Brain Mix)		Microbots	5:03
10.	"Fingers & Thumbs (Cold Summer's Day)" (Tin Tin Out Remix)		Tin Tin Out	8:04
11.	"Breathe" (GRN's 'Anticipated' 12" Re-Mix)		Glen Nicholls	5:19
12.	"Elevation" (BT Remix)		BT	7:09
Total length:				62:52

Deluxe edition (disc three)
No.	Title	Remixed by:	Length
1.	"Victim of Love" (Vixen Vitesse Remix)	Daniel Miller	5:46
2.	"Chains of Love" (Vince Clarke Remix)	Clarke	5:13
3.	"Drama!" (Krucial Remix)	Bob Kraushaar	7:07
4.	"You Surround Me" (Mark Saunders Remix)	Mark Saunders	7:32
5.	"Star" (Interstellar Mix)	William Orbit	6:28
6.	"Am I Right?" (The Grid Remix)	The Grid	6:40
7.	"Run to the Sun" (Beatmasters' Galactic Remix)	The Beatmasters	7:20
8.	"In My Arms" (BBE Remix)	B.B.E.	4:17
9.	"Freedom" (Mark Picchiotti Strumapella Remix)	Mark Picchiotti	8:11
10.	"Be with You" (Starshapes Remix)	Starshapes	4:57
11.	"Sometimes" (Erasure & Flood Mix)	Erasure & Flood	4:55
Total length:			68:26

== Charts ==
Chart performance for Always: The Very Best of Erasure
Chart (2015)	Peak position
Belgian Albums (Ultratop Flanders)	146
German Albums (Offizielle Top 100)	91
Irish Albums (IRMA)	68
UK Albums (Official Charts)	9
UK Independent Albums (Official Charts)	1

2023 chart performance for Always: The Very Best of Erasure
Chart (2023)	Peak position
German Albums (Offizielle Top 100)	42

== Certifications ==
Certifications for Always: The Very Best of Erasure
Region	Certification	Certified units/sales
United Kingdom (BPI)	Gold	100,000^{‡}
^{‡} Sales+streaming figures based on certification alone.
