= Wild! (video) =

Video by Erasure
- Released: 1990; 2016 (re-release)
- Recorded: 11 December 1989
- Venue: London Arena (London, England)
- Genre: Synth-pop; electropop; pop
- Length: 90 minutes approx
- Label: Mute Film/BMG Video; Mute Film/Warner; Mute Film/Lumivision/Warner
- Director: Gavin Taylor
- Producer: Ken Scorfield

Erasure chronology
Innocents (1989)	Wild! (1990)	Abba-esque (1992)

Wild! is the third concert video release by English synth-pop duo Erasure, recorded at the London Arena on 11 December 1989 as part of the tour in support of the Wild! album and released in 1990 on VHS video. With 23 tracks and a running time of almost 90 minutes, it is the first of Erasure's live videos to feature an entire concert, except in the U.S. where a much abridged 15-track version was released. In 1992 the concert was also released in the U.S. on LaserDisc, still with only 15 tracks. In 2016 it was announced that the video will be released on DVD, exclusively as part of the From Moscow to Mars box set.

The concert included 9 of the 10 songs from Wild!, as well as songs from all 3 of Erasure's previous albums, songs from the Crackers International EP and a cover version of Cerrone's "Supernature", a studio version of which featured as a B-side on the "You Surround Me" single.

== Track listing ==
=== UK release ===
- UK VHS video: 790407
1. "Piano Song"
2. "How Many Times"
3. "You Surround Me"
4. "Knocking on Your Door"
5. "Brother and Sister"
6. "Crown of Thorns"
7. "Star"
8. "Chains of Love"
9. "Hideaway"
10. "Supernature"
11. "Who Needs Love Like That"
12. "Stop!"
13. "Victim of Love"
14. "La Gloria"
15. "Ship of Fools"
16. "It Doesn't Have to Be"
17. "Blue Savannah"
18. "Sometimes"
19. "The Hardest Part"
20. "Oh L'amour"
21. "Drama!"
22. "A Little Respect"
23. "Spiralling"

=== North American release ===
- U.S. VHS video: 38170–3
- U.S. LaserDisc: LVD-9263
1. "Piano Song"
2. "You Surround Me"
3. "Chains of Love"
4. "Star"
5. "Crown of Thorns"
6. "Supernature"
7. "Who Needs Love Like That"
8. "Stop!"
9. "Victim of Love"
10. "La Gloria"
11. "Blue Savannah"
12. "Sometimes"
13. "The Hardest Part"
14. "Drama!"
15. "A Little Respect"
