= The Violet Flame =

Studio album by Erasure
- Released: 22 September 2014
- Recorded: 2014
- Genre: Synth-pop
- Length: 35:39
- Label: Mute
- Producers: Richard X; Erasure

Erasure chronology
Snow Globe (2013)	The Violet Flame (2014)	Always: The Very Best of Erasure (2015)

Singles from The Violet Flame
- 1. "Elevation" Released: 15 September 2014; 2. "Reason" Released: 24 November 2014; 3. "Sacred" Released: 16 March 2015

The Violet Flame is the sixteenth studio album by English synth-pop duo Erasure, released by Mute Records on 22 September 2014 in the United Kingdom and on 23 September 2014 in North America.

Two limited edition supplemental discs were produced: Live at Short Circuit, The Roundhouse, London 14/05/11; and The Violet Flame Remixed, which features remixes from artists including BT, Carter Tutti, Paul Humphreys (of OMD), Daniel Miller, and Parralox.

== Overview ==
The album contains original tracks written by band members Vince Clarke and Andy Bell, and is produced by Erasure and Richard X. The tracks were composed on synthesizers, rather than guitar and piano; a first for the duo.

The single, "Elevation", was released as a prelude to the album, with a coinciding world tour. A subsequent single, "Reason", was released on 24 November 2014, with new track "Die 4 Love" as the B-side, and a third single "Sacred" on 16 March 2015

The track listing for The Violet Flame was revealed on 18 July 2014.

On 28 September, the album charted at number 20 on the UK Albums Chart, becoming the duo's first top-20 album since Other People's Songs (2003). In the United States, the album entered the Billboard 200 at number 48, giving Erasure their first top-50 album since Cowboy (1997), while peaking at number two on the US Dance/Electronic Albums chart.

== Track listing ==
The Violet Flame was released as a standard CD, a deluxe 2-CD, a digital download, a double album in a gatefold sleeve (featuring The Violet Flame on violet vinyl on one disc and six remixes on white vinyl on the other, via PledgeMusic with more than 500 pre-orders), and a limited edition 3-CD box set which includes the original album as well as additional material.

All tracks are written by Andy Bell, Vince Clarke and Richard X.

No.	Title	Length
1.	"Dead of Night"	3:16
2.	"Elevation"	4:17
3.	"Reason"	3:43
4.	"Promises"	3:46
5.	"Be the One"	3:43
6.	"Sacred"	4:06
7.	"Under the Wave"	3:46
8.	"Smoke and Mirrors"	3:48
9.	"Paradise"	3:23
10.	"Stayed a Little Late Tonight"	3:51

Limited edition disc two – Live at Short Circuit, The Roundhouse, London 14/05/11
No.	Title	Length
1.	"Hideaway"
2.	"Fingers & Thumbs (Cold Summer's Day)"
3.	"Heavenly Action"
4.	"Always"
5.	"Ship of Fools"
6.	"Victim of Love"
7.	"Breathe"
8.	"Chains of Love"
9.	"Sometimes"
10.	"Blue Savannah"
11.	"A Little Respect"

Limited edition disc three – The Violet Flame Remixed
No.	Title	Length
1.	"Dead of Night" (WAWA's in the Dark Club Mix)
2.	"Elevation" (BT Remix)
3.	"Reason" (Carter Tutti Remix (Edit))
4.	"Promises" (Astrolith Remix)
5.	"Be the One" (Paul Humphreys Remix)
6.	"Sacred" (Daniel Miller Mix (Edit))
7.	"Under the Wave" (Parralox Extended Mix)
8.	"Smoke and Mirrors" (Atatika Remix)
9.	"Paradise" (Black Light Odyssey Remix)
10.	"Stayed a Little Late Tonight" (Koishii & Hush vs Ric Scott Remix)

== Charts ==
Chart performance for The Violet Flame
Chart (2014)	Peak position
Czech Albums (ČNS IFPI)	30
Danish Albums (Hitlisten)	5
German Albums (Offizielle Top 100)	41
Irish Albums (IRMA)	53
Scottish Albums (Official Charts)	19
Spanish Albums (Promusicae)	100
Swedish Albums (Sverigetopplistan)	37
UK Albums (Official Charts)	20
UK Independent Albums (Official Charts)	4
US Billboard 200	48
US Independent Albums (Billboard)	9
US Top Dance Albums (Billboard)	2
