= Erasure.Club =

Remix album by Erasure
- Released: 10 August 2009
- Recorded: 1985–1992
- Genre: Synth-pop; dance
- Label: Mute
- Producer: Flood; Stephen Hague; Dave Jacob; Erasure; Gareth Jones; Mark Saunders; Martyn Phillipps; David Bascombe

Erasure chronology
Total Pop! The First 40 Hits (2009)	Erasure.Club (2009)	Phantom Bride EP (2009)

Erasure.Club is a remix EP by English synth-pop duo Erasure. Featuring six remixes (four previously commercially unavailable), it was released on 10 August 2009 by Mute Records.

In 1990, Mute released a series of rare promotional Erasure 12" singles, using the umbrella term "Erasure – Club" for the series. The four singles released were "Push Me Shove Me" (ERAS1) from the Wonderland album, "Sometimes" (ERAS2) from The Circus, "Ship of Fools" (ERAS3) from The Innocents and the standalone "Abba-esque Remixes" (ERAS4).

Erasure.Club collects six mixes from the first three 12" singles – three from ERAS1, one from ERAS2 and two from ERAS3. ERAS4 was eventually given a commercial release.

Due to copyright issues, Fortran 5's remix "Who Needs Love (Like That) – Winnie Cooper Mix" from ERAS2 is not included on the EP.

== Track listing ==
CD (ERAS1CD)
No.	Title	Remixer(s)	Length
1.	"Push Me Shove Me (Moonbeam Mix)"	Jon Marsh	6:22
2.	"Push Me Shove Me (Catatonic Mix)"	Jon Marsh	4:13
3.	"Senseless (Avalon Mix)"	Bruce Forest	6:26
4.	"Ship of Fools (Orbital Southsea Isles of Holy Beats Mix)"	Dr Alex Paterson & Thrash	9:40
5.	"Sometimes (Danny Rampling Mix)"	Danny Rampling	6:01
6.	"Weight of the World (Heavy 'B' Mix)"	Bruce Smith	5:03

Tracks 4 and 5 were commercially released in 1992 on the "Who Needs Love (Like That)" limited remix single.
