= Phantom Bride EP =

Phantom Bride

Remix album by Erasure
- Released: 12 October 2009
- Recorded: 1987–2009
- Genre: Synth-pop; dance
- Label: Mute
- Producer: Stephen Hague; Dave Jacob; Erasure

Erasure chronology
Erasure.Club (2009)	Phantom Bride (2009)	Tomorrow's World (2011)

Phantom Bride is a remix EP by English synth-pop duo Erasure. It was released by Mute Records on CD and download on 12 October 2009 to commemorate the release of the 21st anniversary edition of The Innocents.

The EP features new remixes of tracks from The Innocents album.

== Track listing ==
Track listing adapted from Tidal.

No.	Title	Remixer(s)	Length
1.	"Phantom Bride" (2009 Remaster)		3:34
2.	"Hallowed Ground" (Vince Clarke's Big Mix)	Vince Clarke	4:00
3.	"Chains of Love" (Almighty 12" Definitive Mix)		7:18
4.	"Phantom Bride" (Ghostly Groom Dub by FrankMusik)	FrankMusik	3:44
5.	"A Little Respect" (Wayne G & Alan Allder Hurdy Gurdy Club Mix)	Wayne G & Alan Allder	7:32
6.	"Heart of Stone" (Joebot's 'Ounce of Bounce' Remix)	Joebot	6:25
7.	"Phantom Bride" (Dogmatix's 12" Tearless Mix)	Dogmatix	6:11
8.	"Chains of Love" (Plastic Operator Remix)	Plastic Operator	5:53
