= World Be Gone =

Studio album by Erasure
- Released: 19 May 2017
- Recorded: 2016
- Genre: Synth-pop
- Length: 39:11
- Label: Mute
- Producer: Erasure

Erasure chronology
From Moscow to Mars (2016)	World Be Gone (2017)	The Neon (2020)

Singles from World Be Gone
- 1. "Love You to the Sky" Released: 2 June 2017; 2. "World Be Gone" Released: 28 July 2017; 3. "Just a Little Love" Released: 6 October 2017

World Be Gone is the seventeenth studio album by English synth-pop duo Erasure, released by Mute Records on 19 May 2017 in the United Kingdom and on 20 May 2017 in North America. The album reached number six on the UK Albums Chart, dropping out of the chart the next week.

== Background ==
In February 2017, it was announced via the Erasure Information Service newsletter that a new album project had been launched on Pledgemusic. The lead single received its UK radio premiere on 16 March on DJ Chris Evans' radio show following a conversation with singer Andy Bell. The album was made available on CD, black vinyl, orange vinyl and on cassette (with the latter including a download code). Thus World Be Gone was one of the few mainstream albums in the year 2017 to be made available as a CD, on vinyl and on cassette at the same time, very much like album releases in the late 80s and early 90s.

== Critical reception ==
Professional ratings
Aggregate scores
Source	Rating
AnyDecentMusic?	6.2/10
Metacritic	69/100
Review scores
Source	Rating
AllMusic	3.5/5 stars
The A.V. Club	B
The Independent	3/5 stars
Magnet	3/5 stars
Mojo	4/5 stars
Newsday	A
Q	3/5 stars
The Times	3/5 stars
Uncut	3/5 stars
The Washington Post	Favourable

World Be Gone received generally positive reviews from critics. At Metacritic, which assigns a normalized rating out of 100 to reviews from mainstream publications, the album received an average score of 69, based on 10 reviews.

== Track listing ==
All tracks are written by Andy Bell and Vince Clarke.

No.	Title	Length
1.	"Love You to the Sky"	4:26
2.	"Be Careful What You Wish For!"	3:21
3.	"World Be Gone"	3:39
4.	"A Bitter Parting"	3:13
5.	"Still It's Not Over"	4:03
6.	"Take Me Out of Myself"	4:34
7.	"Sweet Summer Loving"	3:55
8.	"Oh What a World"	4:15
9.	"Lousy Sum of Nothing"	4:12
10.	"Just a Little Love"	3:33

== Charts ==
Chart performance for World Be Gone
Chart (2017)	Peak position
Australian Albums (ARIA)	186
Belgian Albums (Ultratop Flanders)	169
Belgian Albums (Ultratop Wallonia)	119
Czech Albums (ČNS IFPI)	30
German Albums (Offizielle Top 100)	28
Irish Albums (IRMA)	28
Scottish Albums (OCC)	4
Spanish Albums (Promusicae)	99
Swedish Albums (Sverigetopplistan)	15
Swiss Albums (Schweizer Hitparade)	69
UK Albums (OCC)	6
UK Independent Albums (OCC)	1
US Billboard 200	137
US Independent Albums (Billboard)	7
US Top Alternative Albums (Billboard)	22
US Top Dance Albums (Billboard)	3
US Top Rock Albums (Billboard)	31
