= Snow Globe (album) =

Studio album by Erasure
- Released: 11 November 2013
- Recorded: 2013
- Genre: Synth-pop; Christmas
- Length: 44:45
- Label: Mute
- Producer: Erasure; Gareth Jones

Erasure chronology
Tomorrow's World (2011)	Snow Globe (2013)	The Violet Flame (2014)

Singles from Snow Globe
- 1. "Gaudete" Released: 28 October 2013; 2. "Make It Wonderful" Released: 24 February 2014

Snow Globe is the fifteenth studio album by English synth-pop duo Erasure, released by Mute Records on 11 November 2013 in the United Kingdom and on 12 November 2013 in North America. The album has a holiday music theme, including classic Christmas carols with original tracks written by band members Vince Clarke and Andy Bell, and is produced by the duo along with longtime collaborator Gareth Jones.

== Background ==
The band purposely went with a "stripped-down" and "eerie" feel to many of the tracks, including traditional Christmas ballads "Silent Night" and "White Christmas". Clarke stated, "Everything about Christmas has been written already. We thought it would be more interesting to look into the darker side of the season. For a lot of people, Christmas is not a happy time."

"Blood on the Snow" starts with a staccato style waltz, whilst "Silver Bells" features an android-like orchestra from the future and explores dark imagery of coal, ash and blood, that give way to a bright star and three gifts.

== Singles ==
Snow Globe, launched two singles, with the first single "Gaudete" on 28 October, a dance floor take on the on 16th century medieval Latin carol that was also a hit for Steeleye Span in 1973. The second single was the jubilant "Make it Wonderful".

== Deluxe edition ==
The second CD of the limited edition of Snow Globe includes an acoustic cover version of the 1980s Christmas pop hit "Stop the Cavalry" by Jona Lewie, the traditional spoken piece editorial of Yes, Virginia, there is a Santa Claus, as well as several other acoustic versions and remixes.

== Critical reception ==
Professional ratings
Review scores
Source	Rating
AllMusic	3.5/5 stars

In a review of the album for AllMusic, David Jeffries described "Gaudete" as "[combining] Kraftwerk beats with a 16th century song, and all by way of [previous "Gaudete" performers] Steeleye Span." He opined that "the miracle bit is that Erasure's thoroughly modern take on the cut could warm the heart of a deep space robot, echoing into the vacuum with sequencers, sacred vocals, church bells, and not the slightest hint of cheese." He praised vocalist Andy Bell's performance on the song, calling it "triumphant and sincere", and on the album overall he described musician Vince Clarke's "brand of electro-pop" as "the ghosts of Christmases future, past, and present all at once, with the crispness of the MP3 age meeting bleeps and bloops that could have been on Erasure album number one (1986)." Jeffries went on to say that "Old [Christmas] favorites get the Erasure spin as "Silent Night" is delivered dramatically as if it was Dylan Thomas' "Do Not Go Gentle Into That Good Night", while "White Christmas" is an almost audio verite piece, covering Bell's scratchy record performance with a Pachinko bar worth of downtown Tokyo sounds. That's much more effort than veteran acts usually pour into a holiday album [...].

== Commercial performance ==
Snow Globe appeared briefly at the lower reaches of the albums charts, peaking at number 49 in the UK and number 100 in Germany. The album reached numbers 5 and 30 on the UK and US indie albums charts, respectively.

== Track listing ==
Snow Globe was initially released as a standard CD, a digital download, and a limited edition 3-CD box set which includes the original album as well as alternative versions. The box set, produced in a single run of 3,000 copies, contained an autographed Christmas card, red 'Erasure' branded Christmas tree ornament, a desktop calendar, postcards, 'Erasure' branded balloons (one red, one green), windows stickers, a bag of sweets, and a cocktail book. It sold out via pre-orders before the official release date.

In 2014, an extended Deluxe Nutcracker Edition digital download was made available, including the album, all additional tracks from the second disc of the box set, as well as additional remixes - comprising 29 tracks in all, as well as the videos for "Gaudete" and "Make It Wonderful".

In 2016, to follow BMG's commemoration of the band's 30th anniversary in releasing all previous albums on vinyl (both reissues, and first-ever pressings), Snow Globe was also issued for the first time on vinyl in an extended 2-LP set of which the first pressings were on white vinyl. The second disc contains a selection of previously released alternate versions and remixes.

No.	Title	Writer(s)	Length
1.	"Bells of Love (Isabelle's of Love)"	Andy Bell; Vince Clarke	3:59
2.	"Gaudete"	Traditional	2:43
3.	"Make It Wonderful"	Bell; Clarke	3:34
4.	"Sleep Quietly"	Ruth Heller	2:52
5.	"Silent Night"	Joseph Mohr; Franz Xaver Gruber	3:53
6.	"Loving Man"	Bell; Clarke	3:23
7.	"The Christmas Song"	Mel Tormé; Robert Wells	2:26
8.	"Bleak Midwinter"	Gustav Holst	4:27
9.	"Blood on the Snow"	Bell; Clarke	3:43
10.	"There'll Be No Tomorrow"	Bell; Clarke	3:39
11.	"Midnight Clear"	Edmund Sears; Richard Storrs Willis	3:32
12.	"White Christmas"	Irving Berlin	3:29
13.	"Silver Bells"	Jay Livingston; Ray Evans	3:05

Limited edition box set disc 2 / Deluxe Nutcracker Edition tracks
No.	Title	Writer(s)	Length
1.	"Gaudete" (A Cappella version)	Traditional	2:21
2.	"Stop the Cavalry" (Acoustic version)	Jona Lewie	2:57
3.	"Silent Night" (Instrumental version)	Mohr; Gruber	3:53
4.	"She Won't Be Home" (2013 Redux)	Bell; Clarke	3:09
5.	"Make It Wonderful" (Acoustic version)	Bell; Clarke	3:53
6.	"God Rest Ye Merry Gentlemen" (2013 Redux)	Traditional	3:20
7.	"White Christmas" (Instrumental version)	Berlin	3:33
8.	"Yes Virginia, There Is a Santa Claus" (spoken word piece)	Francis Pharcellus Church	3:49

Limited edition box set disc 3
No.	Title	Length
1.	"The Erasure Christmas Radio Show" (Recorded Live Inside The Snow Globe)	51:52

Deluxe Nutcracker Edition (bonus tracks)
No.	Title	Writer(s)	Length
1.	"Gaudete" (Dave Audé Extended Club Mix)	Traditional	6:38
2.	"Make It Wonderful" (Noel Sanger vs Koishii & Hush Remix)	Bell; Clarke	7:38
3.	"Loving Man" (Knocking Ghost Remix)	Bell; Clarke	3:26
4.	"Gaudete" (Ikon Remix)	Traditional	6:45
5.	"Sleep Quietly" (Maps Remix)	Heller	7:12
6.	"Make It Wonderful" (Bright Light Bright Light Remix)	Bell; Clarke	3:53
7.	"Gaudete" (The Storks Remix)	Traditional	4:45
8.	"Yes Virginia, There Is a Santa Claus" (Jeff Barringer vs. Skerik Remix)	Church	4:16

== Re-release vinyl edition ==
2016 limited edition vinyl issue (second disc)
No.	Title	Writer(s)	Length
1.	"She Won't Be Home" (2013 Redux)	Bell; Clarke	3:09
2.	"God Rest Ye Merry Gentlemen" (Acoustic version)	Traditional	3:20
3.	"Make It Wonderful" (Acoustic version)	Bell; Clarke	3:53
4.	"Stop the Cavalry" (Acoustic version)	Lewie	2:57
5.	"Sleep Quietly" (Maps Remix)	Heller	7:12
6.	"Gaudete" (Dave Audé Extended Club Mix)	Traditional	6:38
7.	"Make It Wonderful" (Bright Light Bright Light Remix)	Bell; Clarke	3:53
8.	"Loving Man" (Knocking Ghost Remix)	Bell; Clarke	3:26
9.	"Yes Virginia, There Is a Santa Claus" (Jeff Barringer vs. Skerik Remix)	Church	4:16

== Personnel ==
Adapted from the album's liner notes.

Erasure

- Andy Bell – vocals
- Vince Clarke – synthesizers, programming

Technical

- Erasure – producer
- Gareth Jones – producer, additional programming
- Richard X – additional production
- Pete Hofmann – additional production
- Mike Marsh – mastering
- Martin Meunier, Tonya Hurley, Paul A. Taylor – art direction
- Louise Hendy – design
- Miguel Sandoval, Lauren Sassen, Barney Marquez – character design & illustration
- Leo Garza – model & art

== Charts ==
Chart performance for Snow Globe
Chart (2013)	Peak position
German Albums (Offizielle Top 100)	100
Scottish Albums (OCC)	57
UK Albums (OCC)	49
UK Independent Albums (OCC)	5
US Independent Albums (Billboard)	30
US Top Current Album Sales (Billboard)	162
US Top Holiday Albums (Billboard)	40
US Top Rock Albums (Billboard)	46
