= Crackers International =

EP by Erasure
- Released: 28 November 1988
- Recorded: 1988
- Studios: The Power Plant, London
- Genres: Synth-pop; hi-NRG
- Length: 24:55
- Labels: Mute; Sire
- Producer: Erasure

Erasure chronology
The Innocents (1988)	Crackers International (1988)	Wild! (1989)

Erasure singles chronology
"A Little Respect" (1988)	"Stop!" (1988)	"Drama!" (1989)

Alternative cover
- Crackers International Part 2 cover

Music video
- "Stop!" on YouTube

Professional ratings
Review scores
Source	Rating
AllMusic	3/5 stars

Crackers International is a Christmas EP released by English synth-pop duo Erasure in November 1988, in between the albums The Innocents (1988) and Wild! (1989). The EP reached number-one in Denmark and Argentina, and peaked at number two in the United Kingdom and Ireland.

== History ==
The EP appeared in several different versions. The original UK release by Mute Records consisted of four original, self-produced tracks. In the UK, where at the time EPs were eligible for the singles chart, it became one of Erasure's most successful releases, matching the number two peak of 1986's "Sometimes". It was promoted with a simple music video for the lead track "Stop!", showing Clarke and Bell performing the song on a stage surrounded by "stop", "no entry", "give way" and similar road signs.

In the US, Crackers International was still considered an EP, although two remixes were added (bringing the track list count to six) when Sire Records released it. In the US, where EPs chart on the Billboard 200, it hit number seventy-three. The song "Stop!" was also released as its own stand-alone single in the US, just barely making an appearance on the Billboard Hot 100 (number 97). On the US Hot Dance Music/Club Play chart "Stop!" / "Knocking on Your Door" peaked at number four as a double-sided entry.

Additionally, a version of the EP was released in the UK by Mute Records in a very limited-edition, seasonal pressing, titled Crackers International Part 2. Released originally in 12" vinyl with extended versions of "Stop!" and "Knocking on Your Door", both remixed by Mark Saunders, it also added the Christmas standard "God Rest Ye Merry Gentlemen". It was subsequently released as a compact disc containing the original 7" versions of "Stop!" and "Knocking on Your Door" (also of note is the fact that there were two different versions of the single mix of "Stop!", one with a fade, and a slightly longer one with a 'cold' ending).

Sire Records commissioned some mixes for the song by Justin Strauss, who previously had remixed "A Little Respect" for the US market, but the mixes remain unreleased.

Twenty-five years after Crackers International, in 2013, Erasure would finally release a proper Christmas album, titled Snow Globe.

== Critical reception ==
All Music gave the EP a 3-star rating.

=== Stop reviews ===
- Ned Raggett from AllMusic complimented "Stop!" as brilliant, noting its "infectious energy".
- Everett True from Melody Maker stated that "it takes some kinda fool genius to create fast songs of the scope and emotional rush" of "Stop!".
- In 2009, Darren Lee from The Quietus noted the "pouting disco throb" of the song, praising it as one of "the most gloriously effervescent pop anthems ever recorded."
- In 2014, Chris Gerard from Metro Weekly wrote, "Opening with a whirring burst of synthesizer, "Stop!" goes right into a manic and irresistible dance beat completely with a chorus designed for singing along. "Stop!" is 3:02 of pure energy, a sure bet to fill the dance-floor during any '80s night. "Stop!" is a synth-pop classic."

== Track listing ==
- 7", Mute / E Mute 93 (UK)
1. "Stop!" (fade ending) – 2:55
2. "The Hardest Part" – 3:40
3. "Knocking on Your Door" – 2:57
4. "She Won't Be Home" – 3:28

Note: There was also a 2 track 7" produced mainly for jukeboxes (Mute 93) with the same versions of "Stop!" and "Knocking on Your Door" as the 4 track version.

- 7", Sire-Reprise / 22879-7 (US)
1. "Stop!" (7-inch version) – 2:55
2. "Ship of Fools" – 4:01

Note: "7-inch version" same as "fade ending", also released on MC (22879-4)

- 12", Mute / 12 Mute 93 (UK)
1. "Stop!" (cold ending) – 3:03
2. "The Hardest Part" (12" version) – 5:07
3. "Knocking on Your Door" (12" version) – 3:59
4. "She Won't Be Home" – 3:28

Note: also released on CD (CD Mute 93)

- 12", Mute / L12 Mute 93 (UK)
1. "Stop!" (Mark Saunders remix) – 5:47
2. "Knocking on Your Door" (Mark Saunders remix) – 6:07
3. "God Rest Ye Merry, Gentlemen" – 3:12

Note: Released as "Crackers International part II", also released on CD (LCD Mute 93)

- 12", Sire-Reprise / 25904-1 (US)
1. "Stop!" (7-inch version) – 2:55
2. "The Hardest Part" – 3:40
3. "Stop!" (12" remix) – 5:47
4. "Knocking on Your Door" – 2:57
5. "She Won't Be Home" – 3:28
6. "Knocking on Your Door" (12" remix) – 6:07

Note: also released on CD (25904-2) and MC (25904-4), 12" mixes by Mark Saunders

- CD, Mute / EBX 3.1 (UK)
1. "Stop!" (cold ending) – 3:03
2. "The Hardest Part" – 3:40
3. "Knocking on Your Door" – 2:57
4. "She Won't Be Home" – 3:28
5. "The Hardest Part" (12" version) – 5:06
6. "Knocking on Your Door" (12" version) – 3:59
7. "Stop!" (Mark Saunders remix) – 5:47
8. "Knocking on Your Door" (Mark Saunders remix) – 6:07
9. "God Rest Ye Merry Gentlemen" – 3:10

Note: Part of the CD single box set

== Charts ==
=== Weekly charts ===
Weekly chart performance for Crackers International
Chart (1989)	Peak position
Argentina (CAPIF)	1
Austria (Ö3 Austria Top 40)	16
Belgium (Ultratop 50 Flanders)	36
Brazil (Nopem/ABPD)	5
Bolivia	10
Colombia	5
Denmark (Tracklisten)	1
Europe (Eurochart Hot 100 Singles)	3
Finland (Suomen virallinen lista)	21
Ireland (IRMA)	2
Netherlands (Dutch Top 40 Tipparade)	13
Netherlands (Single Top 100)	49
New Zealand (Recorded Music NZ)	40
Switzerland (Schweizer Hitparade)	15
UK Singles (Official Charts)	2
US Billboard 200	73
West Germany (GfK)	18

=== Year-end charts ===
Year-end chart performance for Crackers International
Chart (1988)	Position
UK Singles (OCC)	24

Chart (1989)	Position
Europe (Eurochart Hot 100 Singles)	91
UK Singles (OCC)	60
West Germany (Media Control)	96

== Personnel ==
- Erasure – producers
- Cameron Jenkins – assistant engineer
- Phil Legg – mixing
- Jock Loveband – assistant engineer
- Alan Moulder – engineer
- Mark Saunders – remixing, mixing
- James Marsh - illustration

=== Remixers ===
==== Mark Saunders ====
1. "Stop!" (Mark Saunders remix) – 5:47
2. "Knocking on Your Door" (12" version) – 3:59
3. "Knocking on Your Door" (Mark Saunders remix) – 6:07

==== Mark Saunders and Phil Legg ====
1. "Stop!" (cold ending) – 3:03
2. "Stop!" (fade ending) – 2:55

==== Phil Legg ====
1. "She Won't Be Home" – 3:28
2. "The Hardest Part" (12" version) – 5:07
