= You Surround Me =

Single by Erasure

from the album Wild!
- B-side: "Supernature"; "91 Steps"
- Released: 27 November 1989
- Recorded: January 1989
- Length: 3:57
- Label: Mute
- Songwriters: Vince Clarke; Andy Bell
- Producers: Gareth Jones; Mark Saunders; Erasure

Erasure singles chronology
"Drama!" (1989)	"You Surround Me" (1989)	"Blue Savannah" (1990)

Alternative cover
- Limited edition "Supernature" 12" single cover

Music video
- "You Surround Me" on YouTube

"You Surround Me" is a song by English synth-pop duo Erasure that was issued in November 1989 by Mute Records as the second single from the band's fourth studio album, Wild! (1989). Written by the duo's Vince Clarke and Andy Bell, it is a heavily synthesized ballad with a dramatic chorus featuring Bell's falsetto. Upon release, "You Surround Me" became Erasure's tenth consecutive top 20 hit on the UK Singles Chart, peaking at #15. It reached #10 on the Irish singles chart, and became a top 40 hit in Germany, where it reached #38. The song was not released as a single in the United States.

== Critical reception ==
Ned Raggett from AllMusic declared "You Surround Me" as "another flat-out winner—it's another slow ballad, but with big, echoing backing that adds a sense of extra theatricality." The Daily Vault's Michael R. Smith complimented it as "a techno ballad to die for and is just as intense as 'Drama'." He added, "It contains a cascading melody that simply glows. File this one under Overlooked Masterpieces." Paul Lester from Melody Maker wrote, "Another odd choice for a single, 'You Surround Me' has a hookline so slender it's scarcely visible to the naked ear, and a beat that, next to all the great house and hip hop records available at present, is just too weak to count." Chris Gerard from Metro Weekly named it "one of the duo's all-time great ballads", remarking that "it has real heart and feeling; it's unabashedly sentimental, but it feels completely genuine." Jaynie Senior from Number One described the song as "lush and fulsome". Christopher Smith from Talk About Pop Music viewed it as "a brooding number with Vince turning on the synths at maximum level while Andy remains in subdued restraint for the most part."

== Music video ==
A music video was made to accompany the song. It features Clarke and Bell performing on a three-level circular stage set, with cityscapes superimposed at various points during the song through a mixture of chroma key and ordinary vision mixing.

== Track listings ==
- 7" single (MUTE99) / Cassette single (CMUTE99)
1. "You Surround Me"
2. "91 Steps"
- 12" single (12MUTE99) / CD single (CDMUTE99)
1. "You Surround Me" (Syrinx Mix)
2. "Supernature"
3. "91 Steps" (+24 Mix)
- Limited 12" single (L12MUTE99) / Limited CD single (LCDMUTE99)
1. "You Surround Me" (Remix)
2. "Supernature" (William Orbit Mix)
3. "91 Steps" (6 Pianos Mix)
- Limited "Supernature" 12" single (XL12MUTE99)
1. "Supernature" (Daniel Miller & Phil Legg Mix)
2. "You Surround Me" (Gareth Jones Mix)
3. "Supernature" (Mark Saunders Mix)

== Charts ==
Chart (1989-1990)	Peak position	Total weeks
Denmark (IFPI)	5	
Iceland	8	
Ireland (IRMA)	10	5
Israel (Israeli Singles Chart)	25	
UK Singles (OCC)	15	9
West Germany (Official German Charts)	38	10
