= Star (Erasure song) =

1990 single by Erasure

Single by Erasure

from the album Wild!
- B-side: "Dreamlike State"
- Released: 21 May 1990
- Genre: Pop
- Length: 3:53
- Label: Mute
- Songwriters: Vince Clarke; Andy Bell
- Producers: Gareth Jones; Mark Saunders; Erasure

Erasure singles chronology
"Blue Savannah" (1990)	"Star" (1990)	"Chorus" (1991)

Music video
- "Star" on YouTube

"Star" is a song by English synth-pop duo Erasure, released in May 1990 by Mute Records as the fourth European (and third American) single from the group's fourth studio album, Wild! (1989). Described as a straightforward dance music track with disco elements, it was written by group members Vince Clarke and Andy Bell. The lyrical content clearly referencing nuclear war; Erasure's own form of protest song. Gareth Jones and Mark Saunders produced it with the duo. When released, the track was remixed slightly for radio, bringing acoustic guitar elements and various background vocal parts forward in the mix. The accompanying music video was directed by John Maybury.

== Critical reception ==
Steven McDonald from AllMusic felt the song is "another one of those rip-roaring Clarke/Bell compositions that's as much fun for the ears as it is for the feet". He described it as "stupendous". Bill Coleman from Billboard magazine wrote, "Pop gem that should have kicked off campaign behind sorely overlooked Wild! album is finally issued with club-ready remixes. He added, "Well-edited "Trafalmadore Mix" should satisfy house-conscious jocks." Ian McCann from NME said, "With a bassline that sounds like it has just woken up with a hangover only to find that someone has been pouring Mescal on the cornflakes, the groove of 'Star' is delicious." Jaynie Senior from Number One remarked its "pure pop". Christopher Smith from Talk About Pop Music stated that the song "returns us to more lively, energetic Erasure as the chorus comes in first then the song gathers pace with each successive verse and chorus." Troy J. Augusto from Variety complimented it as "hook-filled".

== Chart performance ==
"Star" became Erasure's 12th consecutive top-20 hit on the UK Singles Chart, where it peaked at number 11. It also peaked at number 33 in West Germany. In the United States, the song did not enter the Billboard Hot 100, although it became a popular club hit, climbing to number four on the Billboard Dance Club Play chart.

== Music video ==
The music video for "Star" was directed by English filmmaker and artist John Maybury. It was later made available on Erasure's official YouTube channel in 2014 and had generated more than 6.6 million views as of August 2025.

== Track listings ==
- 7-inch and cassette single (MUTE111; CMUTE111)
1. "Star"
2. "Dreamlike State"
- 12-inch single (12MUTE111)
1. "Star" (Trafalmadore mix)
2. "Star" (single mix)
3. "Dreamlike State" (The 12 Hour Technicolor mix)
- Limited 12-inch single (L12MUTE111)
1. "Star" (Interstellar mix)
2. "Star" (Soul mix)
3. "Dreamlike State" (The 24 Hour Technicolor mix)
- CD single (CDMUTE111)
1. "Star" (single mix)
2. "Dreamlike State"
3. "Star" (Trafalmadore mix)
4. "Star" (Soul mix)
- US cassette single (Sire 9 19837-4)
1. "Star"
2. "Dreamlike State"
- US CD maxi-single (21558-2)
1. "Star" (single mix)
2. "Star" (Trafalmadore mix)
3. "Star" (Interstellar mix)
4. "Dreamlike State" (The 24 Hour Technicolor mix)
5. "Star" (Soul mix)

* Also released on 12-inch vinyl (Sire 92-15580) and cassette (Sire 21558-4), minus "Star" (single mix).

== Charts ==
=== Weekly charts ===
Chart (1990)	Peak position
Europe (Eurochart Hot 100)	34
Ireland (IRMA)	11
Israel (Israeli Singles Chart)	14
Luxembourg (Radio Luxembourg)	7
UK Singles (Official Charts)	11
US Dance Club Songs (Billboard)	4
US Dance Singles Sales (Billboard)	4
West Germany (GfK)	33

=== Year-end charts ===
Chart (1990)	Position
US Dance Club Play (Billboard)	49

== Release history ==
Region	Date	Format(s)	Label(s)	Ref.
United Kingdom	21 May 1990	7-inch vinyl; 12-inch vinyl	Mute	
Japan	25 May 1990	Mini-CD	Alfa	
Australia	11 June 1990	7-inch vinyl; 12-inch vinyl; cassette	Mute	
United Kingdom	18 June 1990	CD; cassette	Mute	
