= Blue Savannah =

1990 single by Erasure

Single by Erasure

from the album Wild!
- B-side: "Runaround on the Underground"; "No G.D.M."
- Released: 25 January 1990
- Genre: Pop
- Length: 4:23
- Label: Mute
- Songwriters: Vince Clarke; Andy Bell
- Producers: Gareth Jones; Mark Saunders; Erasure

Erasure singles chronology
"You Surround Me" (1989)	"Blue Savannah" (1990)	"Star" (1990)

Music video
- "Blue Savannah" on YouTube

"Blue Savannah" is a song by English synth-pop duo Erasure from their fourth studio album, Wild! (1989). Written by members Vince Clarke and Andy Bell, the song was released as a single in Japan on 25 January 1990 and was issued in the United Kingdom the following month. Alfa Records released it in Japan as the album's lead single, Mute Records released it in Europe as the album's third single, and Sire Records released it in the United States as the album's second single. It has been described as an uplifting love song.

Following the song's release, "Blue Savannah" became Erasure's eighth top-10 hit in the United Kingdom, where it peaked at number three on the UK singles chart. In Ireland, it reached the same position, making it Erasure's 10th top-10 hit there. Elsewhere, the song reached number one in Israel, number seven in Denmark and number 12 on the US Billboard 12-inch Singles Sales chart. The music video for the song was directed by Kevin Godley, featuring a mysterious blue hand painting Bell and Clarke completely blue.

== Release ==
"Blue Savannah" peaked at number three on the UK Singles Chart. It also was a top-10 hit in Denmark and Ireland and returned the band to the top 20 in West Germany, where the song peaked at number 13. The release of the single brought about the usual array of remixes and B-sides. In 2004, HiBias Records of Canada started their Retro:Active – Rare & Remixed CD series and the 'Out of the Blue' mix received its first official release, on volume one. In 2016, the remix was included on the Erasure 30th-anniversary anthology From Moscow to Mars, making its first-ever official release on an Erasure album.

== Critical reception ==
Ned Raggett from AllMusic declared the song as a "strong number", remarking its "relatively low key pulse, which sounds like a light motorik/Kraftwerk number given the appropriate Erasure sparkle." Bill Coleman from Billboard described it as an "NRG-etic number" and a "lilting, easy-paced gem." Ernest Hardy from Cashbox commented, "Here, Erasure completely shake off their old drag for some Kraftwerk attire, then a Kraftwerk-meets-hip-hop groove thang. It's better than the original." Scottish Dundee Courier complimented the song as "such sterling work".

In a retrospective review, Chris Gerard from Metro Weekly named it "perhaps Erasure's best sounding track—put it on now and it's so fresh that it sounds like it could have been recorded yesterday." He described it as "audio daydream; a sublimely beautiful melody, sung with real feeling by Andy Bell, over some of Vince Clarke's loveliest keyboard work. That amazingly vibrant piano part just pops out of the speakers. This is what great pop music is all about—it makes you feel warm just listening to it." Darren Lee from The Quietus noted "the lush electro-splendour" of "Blue Savannah", stating that it is one of "the most gloriously effervescent pop anthems ever recorded." Christopher Smith from Talk About Pop Music called it "joyous" and "Erasure at its very best." He noted that Bell's voice across the first verses and chorus "are both haunting and sensual in equal measure."

== Music video ==
The accompanying music video for "Blue Savannah" was directed by English singer, songwriter, musician and music video director Kevin Godley. It shows Clarke and Bell performing the song in a large, white room, which gets painted blue as the video progresses. A mysterious blue hand is coming down from above. Reaching the room, it holds a paint brush in view. The camera follows the hand as it paints Clarke and a shirtless Bell until they both are completely blue. Eventually gold-coloured leaves, similar to those shown on the Wild! album cover, blow in and cover the duo as they perform. Danny Scott from Select praised "the splendid colours" of the Godley-directed video.

== Track listings ==
- 7-inch single and cassette single
1. "Blue Savannah"
2. "Runaround on the Underground"
- UK 12-inch and CD single
1. "Blue Savannah"
2. "Runaround on the Underground"
3. "No G.D.M."
- UK limited-edition 12-inch single 1

A1. "Blue Savannah" (Der Deutsche mix II)
B1. "No G.D.M." (Unfinished mix)
B2. "Runaround on the Underground"

- UK limited-edition 12-inch single 2
1. "Blue Savannah" (Der Deutsche mix II)
2. "Blue Savannah" (Der Deutsche mix I)
- UK limited-edition CD single
1. "Blue Savannah" (Der Deutsche mix I)
2. "Blue Savannah" (Der Deutsche mix II)
3. "Runaround on the Underground"
- Japanese mini-CD single
1. "Blue Savannah"
2. "You Surround Me"
- US maxi-CD single
1. "Blue Savannah" (single version) – 3:51
2. "Blue Savannah" (Der Deutsche mix I) – 7:04
3. "Blue Savannah" (Der Deutsche mix II) – 6:13
4. "Runaround on the Underground" (12-inch mix) – 6:41
5. "Blue Savannah" (Mark Saunders remix) – 6:51
6. "Supernature" (William Orbit's mix) – 6:59
7. "No G.D.M." (Zeus B. Held mix) – 4:24
- US and Canadian 12-inch and maxi-cassette single

A1. "Blue Savannah" (Der Deutsche mix I) – 7:04
A2. "Blue Savannah" (Der Deutsche mix II) – 6:13
A3. "Runaround on the Underground" (12-inch mix) – 6:41
B1. "Blue Savannah" (Mark Saunders remix) – 6:51
B2. "Supernature" (William Orbit's mix) – 6:59
B3. "No G.D.M." (Zeus B. Held mix) – 4:24

- US cassette single
1. "Blue Savannah" (7-inch edit) – 3:45
2. "91 Steps" – 5:33

== Charts ==
=== Weekly charts ===
Chart (1990)	Peak position
Australia (ARIA)	159
Canada Dance/Urban (RPM)	17
Denmark (IFPI)	7
Europe (Eurochart Hot 100)	6
Ireland (IRMA)	3
Israel (Israeli Singles Chart)	1
Luxembourg (Radio Luxembourg)	2
Netherlands (Dutch Top 40 Tipparade)	14
Netherlands (Single Top 100)	48
UK Singles (Official Charts)	3
US Dance Club Songs (Billboard)	44
US Dance Singles Sales (Billboard)	12
West Germany (GfK)	13

=== Year-end charts ===
Chart (1990)	Position
Europe (Eurochart Hot 100)	88
Germany (Media Control)	85
UK Singles (OCC)	42

== Release history ==
Region	Date	Format(s)	Label(s)	Ref.
Japan	25 January 1990	Mini-CD	Alfa	
United Kingdom	26 February 1990	7-inch vinyl; 12-inch vinyl	Mute	
Australia	23 April 1990	7-inch vinyl; 12-inch vinyl; cassette	Mute	
