= Other People's Songs =

Studio album by Erasure
- Released: 27 January 2003
- Recorded: 2001–2002
- Studios: 37B (Chertsey, Surrey)
- Genre: Synth-pop
- Length: 41:17
- Label: Mute
- Producers: Erasure; Gareth Jones; Dave Bascombe

Erasure chronology
Loveboat (2000)	Other People's Songs (2003)	Nightbird (2005)

Singles from Other People's Songs
- 1. "Solsbury Hill" Released: 6 January 2003; 2. "Make Me Smile (Come Up and See Me)" Released: 7 April 2003

Professional ratings
Aggregate scores
Source	Rating
Metacritic	47/100
Review scores
Source	Rating
AllMusic	2.5/5 stars
Alternative Press	2/5 stars
Blender	3/5 stars
Drowned in Sound	7/10
The Guardian	2/5 stars
Playlouder	1.5/5 stars
Q	1/5 stars
Rolling Stone	3/5 stars
Uncut	2/10
URB	2/5 stars

Other People's Songs is a cover album by English synth-pop duo Erasure released on 27 January 2003.

The album was originally conceived as a solo project for singer Andy Bell. Once Vince Clarke, the other member of Erasure, became involved, it was released as Erasure's tenth studio album. The tracks were handpicked by Clarke and Bell as ones that influenced them as musicians. It was released in the UK and the US by Mute Records in 2003, and was a Top 20 success in their home country and in Germany.

Other People's Songs gave Erasure their first Top 10 on the UK singles chart in nine years with their cover of Peter Gabriel's song "Solsbury Hill". The album was produced by Erasure with Gareth Jones and Dave Bascombe. Because of Bell's resistance to remaking the classic "Video Killed the Radio Star", the verses are "sung" synthetically by a computer.

== Track listing ==
No.	Title	Writer(s)	Original Artist	Length
1.	"Solsbury Hill"	Peter Gabriel	Peter Gabriel	4:20
2.	"Everybody's Got to Learn Sometime"	James Warren	the Korgis	3:20
3.	"Make Me Smile (Come Up and See Me)"	Steve Harley	Steve Harley & Cockney Rebel	3:56
4.	"Everyday"	Norman Petty/Buddy Holly	Buddy Holly	1:59
5.	"When Will I See You Again"	Gamble and Huff	the Three Degrees	2:58
6.	"Walking in the Rain"	Barry Mann/Cynthia Weil/Phil Spector	the Ronettes	2:47
7.	"True Love Ways"	Holly/Petty	Buddy Holly	3:06
8.	"Ebb Tide"	Robert Maxwell/Carl Sigman	the Righteous Brothers	3:06
9.	"Can't Help Falling in Love"	George David Weiss/Hugo & Luigi	Elvis Presley	3:27
10.	"You've Lost That Lovin' Feelin'"	Mann/Weil/Spector	the Righteous Brothers	3:58
11.	"Goodnight"	Cliff Eberhardt	Cliff Eberhardt	4:08
12.	"Video Killed the Radio Star"	Geoff Downes/Trevor Horn/Bruce Woolley	the Buggles	3:49
Total length:				41:17

== 2016 "Erasure 30" 30th anniversary BMG reissue LP ==
Subsequent to their acquisition of Erasure's back catalogue, and in anticipation of the band's 30th anniversary, BMG commissioned reissues of all previously released UK editions of Erasure albums up to and including 2007's Light at the End of the World. All titles were pressed and distributed by Play It Again Sam on 180-gramme vinyl and shrinkwrapped with a custom anniversary sticker.

== Charts ==
Chart performance for Other People's Songs
Chart (2003)	Peak position
Czech Albums (ČNS IFPI)	48
Danish Albums (Hitlisten)	31
European Albums (Music & Media)	30
German Albums (Offizielle Top 100)	17
Scottish Albums (Official Charts)	17
UK Albums (Official Charts)	17
US Billboard 200	138
US Independent Albums (Billboard)	3
US Top Dance Albums (Billboard)	1
