= A Little Respect =

1988 single by Erasure

Single by Erasure

from the album The Innocents
- B-side: "Like Zsa Zsa Zsa Gabor"; "Love Is Colder Than Death"
- Released: 19 September 1988
- Studio: Blackwing, Swanyard (London, England)
- Genre: Synth-pop; dance-pop; hi-NRG; new wave; Eurodisco
- Length: 3:32
- Label: Mute
- Songwriters: Vince Clarke; Andy Bell
- Producer: Stephen Hague

Erasure singles chronology
"Chains of Love" (1988)	"A Little Respect" (1988)	"Stop!" (1988)

Erasure singles chronology
"Phantom Bride" (2009 Remaster) (2009)	"A Little Respect" (HMI Redux) (2010)	"When I Start To (Break It All Down)" (2011)

Music video
- "A Little Respect" on YouTube

"A Little Respect" is a song written and recorded by British synth-pop duo Erasure, released in September 1988 by Mute Records. It was written by Vince Clarke and Andy Bell. The lyrics are a plea to a lover to show compassion and respect. The heavily synthesized instrumentation is accentuated by acoustic guitar and Bell's vocal falsetto in the chorus. It was their tenth single, from their third studio album, The Innocents (1988). Known as one of their signature songs, the single reached number four on the UK Singles Chart and was Erasure's second consecutive top-20 hit on the US Billboard Hot 100, where it made number 14, and reached number two on the US Billboard Dance Club Play chart.

There are several remixes of the song. It was originally mixed by Mark Saunders and Phil Legg on the 1988 UK singles, and Justin Strauss for the original US release. In 2006 was remixed by Jadded Alliance for the Future Retro remix compilation sampling some elements of the Justin Strauss' remixes from 1988. In 2009 new remixes appeared; one on the Pop! Remixed UK EP, and one more on the Phantom Bride EP celebrating the 25th anniversary of The Innocents by Wayne G and Alan Allder, the same year, on Erasure's official web site two more mixes appeared for download: one by Glenn Nichols and a dub mix of the Wayne G and Alan Allder mix.

An acoustic version of appears on the Moon & the Sky Plus EP in the UK. And another country acoustic version on the live album On the Road to Nashville.

== Critical reception ==
Upon the release of the single, Caren Myers from Melody Maker wrote, "A groovy little monster, all in all." Another Melody Maker editor, Everett True, remarked that "it takes some kinda fool genius to create fast songs of the scope and emotional rush" of the "heart-stopping" "A Little Respect". Jack Barron from NME said, "In point of fact this is a classic Vince Clarke slice of melodramatic Euro-synth-disco. Hypnotic, splendidly sung, it's Abba with a sex change. Agnetha Faltskog without the beard." In a 2009 retrospective review, Darren Lee from The Quietus declared it as "a song so giddily exuberant that even the tawdry spectre of Wheatus can't quite tarnish its lustre".

== Music video ==
The accompanying music video for "A Little Respect" was directed by English musician, video director, commercial artist, designer and photographer Peter Christopherson for Aubrey Powell Productions. It features Clarke singing the song, with Bell sometimes alongside. The main shot is undercut with dramatic and comedic vignettes illustrating literal interpretations of the verse lyrics.

== Impact and legacy ==
In 2012, the Official UK Chart named "A Little Respect" a "pop gem" and inducted the song in its "Pop Gem Hall of Fame", noting that "it still sounds as fresh and as vibrant it did in 1988!" In 2014, Metro Weekly ranked it number-one in their list of "Erasure's 40 Greatest Tracks". Chris Gerard wrote, "Opening with that distinct, stately keyboard riff before an acoustic guitar comes in and adds to the rhythm, 'A Little Respect' is Erasure at their apex. Very few pop songs can be considered perfect, and this is one of them. It is guaranteed even to this day to get a room full of people singing at the top of their lungs. It just feels good. The heavily rhythmic background, the positive and self-affirming lyrics, Andy Bell's note-perfect vocal delivery... it's a combination that came together to form a song for the ages. It reached #14 in the US and #4 in the UK, but it's had the lasting impact of a #1 hit."

In 2020, Treblezine included the song in their "A History of Synth-Pop in 50 Essential Tracks", adding, "If there's a synth-pop Mount Rushmore, surely Vince Clarke is one of the figures carved on its rockface. He appears here twice, as does a former band, and there are a handful of other short-lived projects we left out. But Clarke's most enduring project is also his most purely pop, with the chart performance to prove it. Erasure had 13 top-10 singles in the UK since 1986, plus three US top-40 singles, including this standout opener of 1988's The Innocents. At a lean 3:33, Clarke and Andy Bell compress synth-pop innovation and disco-pop immediacy into a perfect moment of transcendent pop glory." In 2022, Time Out ranked "A Little Respect" number 10 in their "The 50 Best Gay Songs to Celebrate Pride All Year Long". In 2025, Billboard magazine ranked it number 53 in their list of "The 100 Greatest LGBTQ+ Anthems of All Time".

Rugby league club Hull Kingston Rovers adopted "A Little Respect" as the club's official song for the 2015 Challenge Cup Final, their first appearance in a Challenge Cup final match for over 30 years. Initially proving popular among fans, social media videos of Hull Kingston Rovers supporters singing the song following their semi-final victory against Warrington Wolves went viral, resulting in Andy Bell granting the club's players and staff permission to record a charity single in aid of two local children's charities and the Terrence Higgins Trust. Bell later performed the song before a match at the club's Craven Park stadium in 2016 and partnered again with the club and the Terrence Higgins Trust to release a charity kit featuring the song's lyrics.

== Track listings ==
- 7-inch and cassette single
1. "A Little Respect"
2. "Like Zsa Zsa Zsa Gabor"

Note: In the UK, another 7-inch single containing multiple postcards was also issued.

- 12-inch single

A1. "A Little Respect" (extended version)
B1. "Like Zsa Zsa Zsa Gabor" (Mark Freegard remix)
B2. "Love Is Colder Than Death"

- 12-inch remix single

A1. "A Little Respect" (Big Train mix)
B1. "Like Zsa Zsa Zsa Gabor" (Rico Conning remix)
B2. "Love Is Colder Than Death"

- CD single
1. "A Little Respect" (7-inch version) – 3:31
2. "A Little Respect" (Mark Saunders remix) – 6:35
3. "Like Zsa Zsa Gabor" (Rico Conning remix) – 6:05
4. "Love Is Colder Than Death" – 2:10
- US and Canadian 12-inch single

A1. "A Little Respect" (12-inch vocal) – 6:27
A2. "A Little Respect" (12-inch house mix) – 6:42
B1. "A Little Respect" (12-inch remix) – 6:35
B2. "A Little Respect" (Big Train mix) – 6:07
B3. "Like Zsa Zsa Gabor" (Rico Conning remix) – 6:05

- Japanese mini-CD single
1. "A Little Respect"
2. "A Little Respect" (extended version)

== Charts ==
=== Weekly charts ===
Chart (1988–1989)	Peak position
Canada Top Singles (RPM)	26
Denmark (IFPI)	6
Europe (Eurochart Hot 100)	15
Ireland (IRMA)	7
New Zealand (Recorded Music NZ)	24
Switzerland (Schweizer Hitparade)	28
UK Singles (Official Charts)	4
US Billboard Hot 100	14
US Alternative Airplay (Billboard)	15
US Dance Club Songs (Billboard)	2
US Dance Singles Sales (Billboard)	5
US Cash Box Top 100	16
US Dance Tracks (Dance Music Report)	1
West Germany (GfK)	34

=== Year-end charts ===
Chart (1988)	Position
UK Singles (OCC)	46

Chart (1989)	Position
US 12-inch Singles Sales (Billboard)	40
US Dance Club Play (Billboard)	18

== Certifications ==
Region	Certification	Certified units/sales
New Zealand (RMNZ)	Gold	15,000^{‡}
Spain (Promusicae) Remastered Version	Gold	30,000^{‡}
United Kingdom (BPI)	2× Platinum	1,200,000^{‡}
^{‡} Sales+streaming figures based on certification alone.

== Björn Again version ==
"A Little Respect"

Single by Björn Again

from the EP Erasure-ish
- A-side: "Stop!"
- Released: 12 October 1992
- Recorded: 1992
- Length: 3:48
- Label: M&G; Polydor
- Songwriters: Vince Clarke; Andy Bell
- Producer: Stig Saabson

Björn Again singles chronology
"A Little Respect" / "Stop!" (1992)	"Santa Claus Is Coming to Town" / "Little Drummer Boy" (1992)

In June 1992, Erasure released their Abba-esque extended play (EP), which contains cover versions of four ABBA songs. In response, an Australian ABBA parody group called Björn Again covered two Erasure songs—"A Little Respect" and "Stop!"—and included them on their Erasure-ish EP, which was issued as their debut single on 12 October 1992 by M&G and Polydor Records. The two-song EP peaked at number 18 in Ireland, number 25 on the UK Singles Chart and number 67 on the German Singles Chart.

=== Track listings ===
- 7-inch and cassette single
1. "A Little Respect"
2. "Stop!"
- 12-inch picture disc

A. "A Little Respect" (more)
AA. "Stop!" (more)

- CD single
1. "A Little Respect"
2. "Stop!"
3. "A Little Respect" (more)
4. "Stop!" (more)

=== Charts ===
Chart (1992)	Peak position
Europe (Eurochart Hot 100)	71
Ireland (IRMA)	18
Germany (GfK)	67
UK Singles (Official Charts)	25
UK Airplay (Music Week)	48

== Wheatus version ==
"A Little Respect"

Single by Wheatus

from the album Wheatus
- Released: 2 July 2001
- Length: 3:19
- Label: Columbia
- Songwriters: Vince Clarke; Andy Bell
- Producers: Wheatus; Philip A. Jimenez

Wheatus singles chronology
"Teenage Dirtbag" (2000)	"A Little Respect" (2001)	"Wannabe Gangstar" / "Leroy" (2002)

American rock band Wheatus covered "A Little Respect" for their self-titled debut album. Released on 2 July 2001 by Columbia Records, it peaked at number three in the United Kingdom (besting the peak of Erasure's original) while reaching number five in Ireland and number 19 in Austria.

=== Critical reception ===
Ayhan Sahin of Billboard magazine reviewed the song favorably, saying that the version is "surprisingly polished, paying serious homage to Brit synth popsters Andy Bell and Vince Clark [sic]". He goes on to say that the structure of the song stays "intact, as does that super-sticky chorus, with acoustic and electric guitars playing back and forth in place of the '80s electronic beats".

=== Music video ===
The music video was directed by the Malloys and was released in July 2001. It features Shawn Hatosy and Brittany Murphy.

=== Track listings ===
- UK CD single
1. "A Little Respect" – 3:27
2. "Sunshine" (X-ecutioners mix) – 2:52
3. "Teenage Dirtbag" (live at The Chapel) – 4:44
- UK cassette single
1. "A Little Respect" (David Thorner Mix 1) – 3:24
2. "Sunshine" (X-ecutioners mix) – 2:52
- European CD single
1. "A Little Respect" (David Thorner Mix 1) – 3:25
2. "Teenage Dirtbag" (live at The Chapel) – 4:43
- Australian CD single
1. "A Little Respect" (David Thorner Mix 1) – 3:26
2. "Leroy" (live at The Chapel) – 3:40
3. "Wannabe Gangstar" (live at The Chapel) – 4:02
4. "Truffles" (live at The Chapel) – 3:51

=== Charts ===
==== Weekly charts ====
Chart (2001)	Peak position
Austria (Ö3 Austria Top 40)	19
Belgium (Ultratop 50 Flanders)	44
Belgium (Ultratip Bubbling Under Wallonia)	13
Europe (Eurochart Hot 100)	7
Germany (GfK)	32
Ireland (IRMA)	5
Italy (FIMI)	28
New Zealand (Recorded Music NZ)	41
Scottish Singles Sales (Official Charts)	1
Switzerland (Schweizer Hitparade)	84
UK Singles (Official Charts)	3

==== Year-end charts ====
Chart (2001)	Position
Ireland (IRMA)	46
UK Singles (OCC)	69

=== Certifications ===
Region	Certification	Certified units/sales
United Kingdom (BPI)	Silver	200,000^{‡}
^{‡} Sales+streaming figures based on certification alone.

=== Release history ===
Region	Date	Format(s)	Label(s)	Ref(s).
United Kingdom	2 July 2001	CD; cassette	Columbia	
Australia	2 July 2001	CD	Columbia	

== Other cover versions ==
- In 1998, a cover of the song by the Portuguese band Silence 4 was included in their debut album Silence Becomes It. The album also included a shorter version of the song, titled "A (Very) Little Respect".
- In 2009, British singer-songwriter Kate Walsh released a cover version of the song on her album Peppermint Radio.
- In 2009 Jody Watley covered the song for her mixed covers/original album 'The Makeover', included only on the international release.
- In 2011, CoLD SToRAGE recorded a chiptune cover of the track.
- In 2013, Anna Meredith released a cover of the track on her second EP for Moshi Moshi, Jet Black Raider, under the title "ALR".
- In 2014, Juice Vocal Ensemble included an arrangement of the track on their second album, Laid Bare: Love Songs.
- In 2017, JD McPherson covered the track.
- In 2021, Agoney recorded a version of the song for the Spanish film El Cover.
- In 2022, Kevin Johansen recorded another version of the song for his album "Tú ve".
- In 2024, The Hanseroth Twins released a cover the song on their debut album Vera.
