= Drama! =

1989 single by Erasure

Single by Erasure

from the album Wild!
- B-side: "Sweet, Sweet Baby"; "Paradise"
- Released: 18 September 1989
- Genre: Hi-NRG
- Length: 4:08
- Label: Mute
- Songwriters: Vince Clarke; Andy Bell
- Producers: Gareth Jones; Mark Saunders; Erasure

Erasure singles chronology
"Stop!" (1988)	"Drama!" (1989)	"You Surround Me" (1989)

Music video
- "Drama!" on YouTube

"Drama!"
A 5.5 second sample of "Drama!" demonstrating the layered vocals and the mob call out of "Guilty!"

"Drama!" is the first single released from English synth-pop duo Erasure's fourth studio album, Wild! (1989). Written by Vince Clarke and Andy Bell, the song begins with a low-key keyboard line and a subdued vocal from Bell. As the song progresses, the instrumentation and vocals become more hectic, ultimately ending as a full-blown dance track. "Drama!" contains a "Guilty!" exclamation throughout, provided by Scottish band the Jesus and Mary Chain, who were recording in the studio next door. The song was met with critical acclaim from both music critics and fans.

"Drama!" was issued by Mute Records in the UK and Sire Records in the United States. The B-side, "Sweet, Sweet Baby", contains vocal samples from the 1968 Jane Fonda film Barbarella and the 1974 John Carpenter film Dark Star.

== Critical reception ==
Ned Raggett from AllMusic remarked that "Drama!" "has a slightly hysterical tone to it, but its strong dancefloor surge and weirdly droning backing [Andy] Bell harmonies help make it another winner". The Daily Vault's Michael R. Smith found that it is "the fastest song Erasure has ever recorded, beginning with a thunderclap and building to an exciting climax, all made even greater by the video that was made for it". He added, "Only Andy Bell can handle a mouthful lyric like 'one psychological drama after another' and make it mean something." Chris Gerard from Metro Weekly complimented it as "a killer dance track with some great keyboard riffs, Bell's vocal is outstanding, and melodically and lyrically it's unforgettable".

David Giles from Music Week named it "their best single yet", noting that Clarke "cranks up the tempo to almost Hi-NRG frenzy point". He concluded, "Where some of Erasure's earlier work has sounded a little complacent, this really goes for the jugular with Andy Bell in as fine voice as ever." Richard Lowe from Smash Hits felt "Drama" is "woefully predictable", describing it as a "synth-stuffed Hi-NRG romp with quite a good tune and lyrics about how horrible love can be". Christopher Smith from Talk About Pop Music wrote that "with a clang of a bell, we are summoned back into the church of Erasure and treated to a quintessential piece of late 80's electro-pop perfection that builds and builds to its exciting climax".

== Chart performance ==
Released prior to Wild!, "Drama!" continued Erasure's streak of hits on the UK Singles Chart, peaking at number four. The single also fared well in Denmark, where it reached number three, and in Ireland, where it peaked at number five. "Drama!" did not continue Erasure's chart success in the United States, where it failed to enter the Billboard Hot 100, but it did reach number 10 on the Billboard Hot Dance Music/Club Play chart.

== Music video ==
The single was promoted with a music video showing Erasure performing the song in an alley into which plastic bags and bottles are blown by the wind, followed by larger plastic items falling from above. As the items begin to fill up the alley, Clarke and Bell initially escape onto a rooftop, but are ultimately engulfed by the rising tide of plastic. Hands from the clouds point at them, proclaiming them 'Guilty!'

== Track listings ==
- 7-inch, cassette, and Japanese mini-CD single
1. "Drama!"
2. "Sweet, Sweet Baby"
- 12-inch and mini-CD single
1. "Drama!" (Act 2)
2. "Sweet, Sweet Baby" (The Moo-Moo mix)
3. "Paradise"
- Limited-edition 12-inch and mini-CD single
1. "Drama!" (Krucial mix)
2. "Sweet, Sweet Baby" (Medi mix)
3. "Paradise" (Lost and Found mix)
- US and Canadian 12-inch single
1. "Drama!" (Krucial mix) – 7:07
2. "Sweet, Sweet Baby" (Medi mix) – 4:22
3. "Paradise" (Lost and Found mix) – 5:47
4. "Drama!" (Act 2) – 5:28
5. "Sweet, Sweet Baby" (The Moo-Moo mix) – 5:14
6. "Paradise" – 4:08
- US maxi-CD single
1. "Drama!" (Krucial mix) – 7:07
2. "Drama!" (7-inch version) – 4:08
3. "Sweet, Sweet Baby" (Medi mix) – 4:22
4. "Paradise" (Lost and Found mix) – 5:47
5. "Drama!" (Act 2) – 5:28
6. "Sweet, Sweet Baby" (The Moo-Moo mix) – 5:14
7. "Paradise" – 4:08
8. "Sweet, Sweet Baby" (7-inch version) – 4:18

== Charts ==
=== Weekly charts ===
Chart (1989)	Peak position
Australia (ARIA)	157
Austria (Hitradio Ö3)	13
Denmark (IFPI)	3
Europe (Eurochart Hot 100)	12
Finland (Suomen virallinen lista)	15
Ireland (IRMA)	5
New Zealand (Recorded Music NZ)	35
Spain (AFYVE)	18
Switzerland (Schweizer Hitparade)	15
UK Singles (Official Charts)	4
US Alternative Airplay (Billboard)	11
US Dance Club Songs (Billboard) with "Sweet, Sweet Baby"	10
US Dance Singles Sales (Billboard) with "Sweet, Sweet Baby"	13
West Germany (GfK)	12

=== Year-end charts ===
Chart (1989)	Position
UK Singles (OCC)	61
