= Chorus (Erasure song) =

1991 single by Erasure

Single by Erasure

from the album Chorus
- B-side: "Over the Rainbow"; "Snappy"
- Released: 17 June 1991
- Genre: Techno; disco; synth-pop
- Length: 4:26
- Label: Mute
- Songwriters: Vince Clarke; Andy Bell
- Producer: Martyn Phillips

Erasure singles chronology
"Star" (1990)	"Chorus" (1991)	"Love to Hate You" (1991)

Music video
- "Chorus" on YouTube

"Chorus" is a song by English synth-pop duo Erasure, released in June 1991 as the first single from their fifth studio album, Chorus (1991). Produced by Martyn Phillips and written by Erasure members Vince Clarke and Andy Bell, the song features Clarke's electronic soundscapes and Phillips' computerised production. The single was released by Mute Records in the United Kingdom and Sire Records in the United States. It peaked at number three in both Denmark and the UK while reaching number four in Ireland. In the US, it peaked at number 83 on the Billboard Hot 100 and number four on the Billboard Modern Rock Tracks chart.

== Critical reception ==
Larry Flick from Billboard magazine wrote, "Fab British duo makes a welcome return with an environmentally-conscious techno ditty. Singer Andy Bell is in fine voice on this track". Bill Wyman from Entertainment Weekly stated that it "percolates along nicely". A reviewer from Dundee Courier viewed it as a "refreshing burst of pure pop". Andrew Smith from Melody Maker praised the song as "absolutely bloody marvellous", and commented, "The familiar hyperactive throbs and skyward spiralling melodies are here and, as ever, few manage to say nothing with such passion and alacrity as Bell. As it happens, we instinctively know what he means anyway, a sure sign there we're in the presence of greatness."

Pan-European magazine Music & Media noted, "You can hear that these two know what's going on in the clubs without forcing themselves to follow the current dance trend. Melody is their specialty, best witnessed by the title track." David Quantick of NME commented, "It has got a great, um, chorus, some splendid bleeping noises and a chirpy lyric about ecology. There is surely no other criterion for a good record in the 1990s."

=== Retrospective response ===
AllMusic editor Ned Raggett described the song as "another great Erasure anthem". In a 2007 review, the Daily Vault's Michael R. Smith commented, "Yes, the title track has the glaringly errant word "fishes" in the lyrics, but the contagious feel of the music makes up for it." In 2014, Chris Gerard from Metro Weekly ranked it among "Erasure's 40 Greatest Tracks", calling it an "old-school disco raver", that is "driven by frenetic beat, streams of keyboards that sound like lasers beaming into space, and an unforgettable melody sung with great soul by Andy Bell." He added that "Chorus" is one of the Erasure's "signature songs and finest moments." In 2020, Christopher Smith from Talk About Pop Music stated that it "kicks off" the album "in fine style". Also he noted "memorable lines", like "Go ahead with your dreamin'", "your schemin'", "and something about the fishes in the sea!"

== Chart performance ==
Issued prior to the release of the Chorus album, the single returned Erasure to the upper reaches of the UK Singles Chart, debuting and peaking at number three for two weeks. It was also a success in Denmark, Ireland and Switzerland, reaching number three, four and ten. In the United States, the single became Erasure's first Billboard Hot 100 entry since "Stop!" in 1989, climbing to number 83. It was more successful on the Billboard Modern Rock Tracks chart, where it peaked at number four to become the band's highest-placing song on this listing. In South America, "Chorus" was a top-10 hit in Colombia, reaching number eight.

== Track listings ==
- 7-inch and cassette single
1. "Chorus"
2. "Over the Rainbow"
- 12-inch single
1. "Chorus" (Pure Trance mix) – 5:13
2. "Chorus" – 4:30
3. "Snappy" (The Spice Has Risen mix) – 5:14
4. "Chorus" (Transdental trance mix—fade) – 4:58
- UK CD single and Japanese EP
1. "Chorus" – 4:30
2. "Chorus" (Transdental Trance mix) – 5:15
3. "Snappy" – 5:17
4. "Over the Rainbow" – 3:27
- Australian CD single
1. "Chorus" (Pure Trance mix)
2. "Chorus"
3. "Snappy" (The Spice Has Risen mix)
- US maxi-CD single
1. "Chorus" (single mix) – 4:30
2. "Chorus" (Pure Trance mix) – 5:13
3. "Snappy" (12-inch remix) – 5:33
4. "Chorus" (Aggressive Trance mix) – 8:49
5. "Chorus" (Transdental Trance mix) – 5:15
6. "Snappy" (The Spice Has Risen mix) – 5:14
7. "Over the Rainbow" – 3:27
- US 12-inch single and Canadian maxi-cassette single

A1. "Chorus" (Pure Trance mix) – 5:13
A2. "Chorus" (Transdental Trance mix) – 5:15
A3. "Snappy" (12-inch remix) – 5:33
B1. "Chorus" (Aggressive Trance mix) – 8:49
B2. "Snappy" (The Spice Has Risen mix) – 5:14

- US cassette single
1. "Chorus (Fishes in the Sea)" (single mix)
2. "Snappy" (12-inch remix)

== Charts ==
=== Weekly charts ===
Weekly chart performance for "Chorus"
Chart (1991)	Peak position
Australia (ARIA)	77
Austria (Ö3 Austria Top 40)	20
Colombia	8
Denmark (Tracklisten)	3
Europe (Eurochart Hot 100)	8
Europe (European Hit Radio)	9
Finland (Suomen virallinen lista)	12
Germany (GfK)	17
Ireland (IRMA)	4
Luxembourg (Radio Luxembourg)	1
Netherlands (Dutch Top 40 Tipparade)	16
Netherlands (Single Top 100)	72
Sweden (Sverigetopplistan)	37
Switzerland (Schweizer Hitparade)	10
UK Singles (Official Charts)	3
UK Airplay (Music Week)	7
UK Dance (Music Week)	32
UK Indie (Music Week)	1
US Billboard Hot 100	83
US Alternative Airplay (Billboard)	4
US Dance Club Songs (Billboard)	14
US Dance Singles Sales (Billboard)	6

=== Year-end charts ===
Year-end chart performance for "Chorus"
Chart (1991)	Position
Europe (European Hit Radio)	71
UK Singles (OCC)	51
US Modern Rock Tracks (Billboard)	22

== Release history ==
Release dates and formats for "Chorus"
Region	Date	Format(s)	Label(s)	Ref.
United Kingdom	17 June 1991	7-inch vinyl; 12-inch vinyl; CD; cassette	Mute	
Australia	8 July 1991	12-inch vinyl; cassette	Liberation; Mute	
Japan	21 August 1991	CD	Mute	
Australia	19 August 1991	CD	Liberation; Mute	
