= Abba-esque =

1992 EP by Erasure

EP by Erasure
- Released: 1 June 1992
- Genre: Synth-pop
- Length: 17:46
- Label: Mute
- Producer: David Bascombe

Erasure EPs chronology
Am I Right? (1991)	Abba-esque (1992)	I Love Saturday (1994)

Professional ratings
Review scores
Source	Rating
Entertainment Weekly	C+
Freaky Trigger	5/10
Spin Alternative Record Guide	7/10

Abba-esque is an extended play (EP) by English synth-pop duo Erasure. Released on 1 June 1992, the EP was Erasure's first and only No. 1 on the UK Singles Chart and also became a No. 1 hit in Austria, Denmark, Finland, Greece, Ireland, and Sweden.

== Background ==
Mute Records released Abba-esque in the United Kingdom, while Elektra Records released it in the United States. Music videos were produced for all four tracks and issued as a video EP on VHS. A remix EP was also released by Mute Records in the UK which featured the same four songs in heavily reworked form. Shortly after the release, ABBA's Gold: Greatest Hits album also came out, sparking a revival of ABBA's music that has endured well into the 21st century.

After peaking at No. 2 twice (with "Sometimes" in 1986 and Crackers International in 1988), Erasure finally reached No. 1 in the UK with this release, remaining there for five weeks. In the United States, where EPs chart on the Billboard 200, Abba-esque peaked at No. 85. In Sweden the EP peaked at No. 1, staying there for six consecutive weeks, and it also peaked atop the charts of Austria, Denmark, Finland, Greece, and Ireland.

The release of the Abba-esque EP in due course precipitated the release of a similar EP, Erasure-ish, by the ABBA tribute band Björn Again, which features two Erasure tracks, ("A Little Respect" and "Stop!"), performed in the style of ABBA as an answer record.

== Critical reception ==
Joe Brown from The Washington Post wrote, "To promote its summer tour, reportedly a camp extravaganza surpassing the last one, electroduo Erasure offer a sweet, cool pop-sicle – a four-song EP of faithful ABBA covers, delivered without perceptible irony. Like George Michael, who sang a slew of beloved '70s songs on his most recent tour, Andy Bell gets to pretend he is ABBA – specifically Frida and Agnetha. You can imagine Bell singing "S.O.S." and "Lay All Your Love on Me" in front of his bedroom mirror (complete with faintly phonetic English), while synthmeister Vince Clark handles the Björn-and-Benny parts singlehandedly – dense, bleeping-and-whooshing synth textures that sound like Giorgio Moroder's late-'70s settings for Donna Summer. Erasure drags yet another guilty pop pleasure out of the closet – what's surprising now is how grown-up and complex these ABBA songs really were beneath their candy coatings."

== Track listing ==
All tracks written by Benny Andersson and Björn Ulvaeus; "SOS" was co-written with Stig Anderson.

Abba-esque

1. "Lay All Your Love on Me" – 4:45
2. "SOS" – 3:49
3. "Take a Chance on Me" – 3:43
4. "Voulez-Vous" – 5:35

iTunes Store bonus track
No.	Title	Length
5.	"Gimme! Gimme! Gimme!"	3:55

Abba-esque – The Remixes

1. "Voulez-Vous" (Brain Stem Death Test Mix) (remixed by Fortran 5) – 5:46
2. "Lay All Your Love on Me" (No Panties Mix) (remixed by Fortran 5) – 5:10
3. "Take a Chance on Me" (Take a Trance on Me Mix) (remixed by Philip Kelsey) – 13:23
4. "SOS" (Perimeter Mix) (remixed by Chris & Cosey) – 5:17

== Charts ==
=== Weekly charts ===
Chart (1992)	Peak position
Australia (ARIA)	13
Austria (Ö3 Austria Top 40)	1
Belgium (Ultratop 50 Flanders)	4
Canada Top Albums/CDs (RPM)	38
Canada Top Singles (RPM)	52
Denmark (IFPI)	1
Europe (Eurochart Hot 100)	2
Finland (Suomen virallinen lista)	1
Germany (GfK)	2
Greece (IFPI Greece)	1
Hungarian Albums (MAHASZ)	39
Ireland (IRMA)	1
Netherlands (Dutch Top 40)	7
Netherlands (Single Top 100)	4
New Zealand (Recorded Music NZ)	42
Portugal (AFP)	8
Spain Airplay (AFYVE)	40
Sweden (Sverigetopplistan)	1
Switzerland (Schweizer Hitparade)	3
UK Singles (Official Charts)	1
UK Indie (Music Week)	1
US Billboard 200	85

=== Year-end charts ===
Chart (1992)	Position
Australia (ARIA)	88
Austria (Ö3 Austria Top 40)	3
Belgium (Ultratop)	28
Europe (Eurochart Hot 100)	5
Germany (Media Control)	5
Netherlands (Dutch Top 40)	59
Netherlands (Single Top 100)	60
Sweden (Topplistan)	1
Switzerland (Schweizer Hitparade)	5
UK Singles (OCC)	7

=== Decade-end charts ===
Chart (1990–1999)	Position
Austria (Ö3 Austria Top 40)	41

== Certifications ==
Region	Certification	Certified units/sales
Austria (IFPI Austria)	Gold	25,000^{*}
Germany (BVMI)	Gold	250,000^{^}
United Kingdom (BPI)	Gold	400,000^{^}
^{*} Sales figures based on certification alone.^{^} Shipments figures based on certification alone.

== Release history ==
Region	Date	Format(s)	Label(s)	Ref.
United Kingdom	1 June 1992	7-inch vinyl; 12-inch vinyl; CD; cassette	Mute	
Australia	15 June 1992	CD; cassette	Liberation; Mute	
Australia	13 July 1992	12-inch vinyl	Liberation; Mute	
Japan	21 July 1992	CD	Mute	
Australia	28 September 1992	12-inch vinyl; CD (remixes)	Liberation; Mute	
