= Wild! =

Studio album by Erasure
- Released: 16 October 1989
- Recorded: 1989
- Studios: The Church (London); Swing (London)
- Genre: Synth-pop
- Length: 38:28
- Labels: Mute; Sire
- Producers: Gareth Jones; Mark Saunders; Erasure

Erasure chronology
| The Innocents (1988) | Wild! (1989) | Chorus (1991) |

Singles from Wild!
- 1. "Drama!" Released: 18 September 1989; 2. "You Surround Me" Released: 27 November 1989; 3. "Blue Savannah" Released: 25 January 1990; 4. "Star" Released: 21 May 1990

Professional ratings
Review scores
| Source | Rating |
|---|---|
| AllMusic | 2/5 stars |
| Hi-Fi News & Record Review | A:1 |
| New Musical Express | 3/10 |
| Number One | 4/5 stars |
| Record Mirror | 4.5/5 stars |

Wild! is the fourth studio album by English synth-pop duo Erasure. Released in October 1989, the album was produced by the band, along with Gareth Jones and Mark Saunders, and released by Mute Records in the UK and Sire Records in the U.S.

== History ==
During the album's production, singer Andy Bell recorded with producer Gareth Jones at the Church Studios, while Vince Clarke worked on the synths and programming with producer Mark Saunders at Vince's home studio—both in London.

Upon release, Wild! became Erasure's second consecutive number-one album in the UK and all four singles taken from the album hit the UK Top 20, with "Drama!" and "Blue Savannah" reaching the Top 5.

In the U.S., the album reached number 57 on the Billboard 200, but none of the singles released from it charted on the Billboard Hot 100. Three songs from Wild! charted on Billboard's Hot Dance Music/Club Play chart (Star peaking at number 4, Drama! b/w Sweet, Sweet Baby at 10 and Blue Savannah at 44). "You Surround Me" was not released as a single in the United States. The album also charted well in Germany, where it hit number 16.

== Reissues ==
Subsequent to their acquisition of Erasure's back catalogue, and in anticipation of the band's 30th anniversary in 2016, BMG commissioned reissues of all previously released UK editions of Erasure albums up to and including 2007's Light at the End of the World. All titles were pressed and distributed by Play It Again Sam on 180-gram vinyl and shrinkwrapped with a custom anniversary sticker.

A two-disc version of the album was released by BMG in the UK and Europe on 29 March 2019 to commemorate the original 1989 release. It features the remastered album on disc one and a selection of rarities, B-sides, live tracks, and new remixes on disc two.

== Track listing ==
All tracks are written by Andy Bell & Vince Clarke.

| No. | Title | Length |
|---|---|---|
| 1. | "Piano Song" (Instrumental) | 1:09 |
| 2. | "Blue Savannah" | 4:27 |
| 3. | "Drama!" | 4:04 |
| 4. | "How Many Times?" | 3:17 |
| 5. | "Star" | 3:53 |
| 6. | "La Gloria" | 3:10 |
| 7. | "You Surround Me" | 3:57 |
| 8. | "Brother and Sister" | 3:24 |
| 9. | "2,000 Miles" | 3:38 |
| 10. | "Crown of Thorns" | 3:59 |
| 11. | "Piano Song" | 3:15 |
| Total length: | | 38:28 |

2019 Reissue CD2: B-Sides, Remixes & Rarities
| No. | Title | Length |
|---|---|---|
| 1. | "Sweet, Sweet Baby" (The Moo Moo Mix) | 5:12 |
| 2. | "Drama!" (Richard Norris Mix) | 6:39 |
| 3. | "Blue Savannah" (Mark Saunders 12" Mix) | 6:51 |
| 4. | "Piano Song" (Live at the London Arena) | 3:34 |
| 5. | "Runaround on the Underground" (Remix) | 6:38 |
| 6. | "How Many Times?" (Alternative Mix) | 3:17 |
| 7. | "Supernature" (Daniel Miller & Phil Legg Remix) | 6:53 |
| 8. | "Star" (Soul Mix) | 5:22 |
| 9. | "No G.D.M." (Unfinished Mix) | 4:25 |
| 10. | "Drama!" (Act 2) | 5:38 |
| 11. | "Brother and Sister" (Live at the London Arena) | 3:33 |
| 12. | "Dreamlike State" (7" A Capella Mix) | 3:29 |
| 13. | "You Surround Me" (Gareth Jones Mix) | 6:17 |
| 14. | "91 Steps" (6 Pianos Mix) | 5:24 |
| Total length: | | 73:12 |

== Charts ==
=== Weekly charts ===
Weekly chart performance for Wild!
| Chart (1989) | Peak position |
|---|---|
| Argentine Albums (CAPIF) | 3 |
| Australian Albums (ARIA) | 107 |
| Brazilian Albums (NOPEM/ABPD) | 1 |
| Canada Top Albums/CDs (RPM) | 46 |
| Danish Albums (Hitlisten) | 3 |
| European Albums (Music & Media) | 6 |
| Finnish Albums (Suomen virallinen lista) | 40 |
| German Albums (Offizielle Top 100) | 16 |
| Swedish Albums (Sverigetopplistan) | 20 |
| Swiss Albums (Schweizer Hitparade) | 24 |
| UK Albums (Official Charts) | 1 |
| UK Independent Albums (MRIB) | 1 |
| US Billboard 200 | 57 |

=== Year-end charts ===
1989 year-end chart performance for Wild!
| Chart (1989) | Position |
|---|---|
| UK Albums (Gallup) | 22 |

1990 year-end chart performance for Wild!
| Chart (1990) | Position |
|---|---|
| UK Albums (OCC) | 48 |

== Certifications ==
Certifications for Wild!
| Region | Certification | Certified units/sales |
|---|---|---|
| Argentina | — | 100,000 |
| United Kingdom (BPI) | 2× Platinum | 600,000^{^} |
^{^} Shipments figures based on certification alone.
