= Chains of Love (Erasure song) =

Single by Erasure

from the album The Innocents
- B-side: "Don't Suppose"; "The Good, the Bad and the Ugly"
- Released: 30 May 1988
- Recorded: 1988
- Genre: Synth-pop; dance-pop; new wave; Europop; disco
- Length: 3:45
- Label: Mute (UK); Sire (US)
- Songwriters: Vince Clarke; Andy Bell
- Producer: Stephen Hague

Erasure singles chronology
"Ship of Fools" (1988)	"Chains of Love" (1988)	"A Little Respect" (1988)

Music video
- "Chains of Love" on YouTube

"Chains of Love" is a song by English synth-pop duo Erasure, released in May 1988 as their ninth single overall. It was written by Vince Clarke and Andy Bell, and released by Mute Records as the second single from Erasure's third studio album, The Innocents (1988). In the United States, Sire Records released it as the first single. The chorus is memorable for Bell's use of falsetto. The album version was produced by Stephen Hague and was slightly remixed for its single release (most notably the album version starts cold, while the radio version contains a short synthesizer pattern as an intro). The accompanying music video featured Clarke and Bell performing the song while being hoisted through the air by thick, metal chains.

== Composition ==
"Chains of Love" is an uptempo dance-oriented synth-pop track with Clarke's signature analogue sound and Bell's lyrics about breaking through any restrictions or stereotypes of what love should be. The lyrics allude subtly to Bell's desire for wider acceptance of gay couples, his pain evident from the opening lines "How can I explain when there are few words I can choose/How can I explain when words get broken".

== Critical reception ==
Carmen Keats from Melody Maker wrote, "This time, though, I can sort of stand the relentless disco beat because of the candy-sad words, which are nicely perceptive and suit the fairground kerfuffle." Chris Gerard from Metro Weekly described the song as an "uber-catchy pop masterpiece" with a "soulful chorus". Pan-European magazine Music & Media viewed it as "a highly contagious, straight pop song that immediately sticks in your head. Their best choice for a single to date."

== Chart performance ==
"Chains of Love" became Erasure's sixth consecutive top 20 hit on the UK Singles Chart, just missing the top 10 by peaking at number 11. In the United States, it became Erasure's mainstream breakthrough by climbing to number 12 on the Billboard Hot 100 and becoming the group's first entry on the Billboard Modern Rock Tracks chart. It also hit number four on the Billboard Hot Dance Music/Club Play chart. "Chains of Love" remains Erasure's highest-charting single in the United States.

== Track listings ==
- 7", Mute / MUTE83 (UK)
1. "Chains of Love" (single mix) – 3:38
2. "Don't Suppose" – 3:27
- 12", Mute / 12MUTE83 (UK)
1. "Chains of Love" (Foghorn mix) – 6:24
2. "Don't Suppose" (Country Joe mix) – 5:57
3. "The Good, the Bad and the Ugly" (Ennio Morricone) – 3:15
- 12", Mute / L12MUTE83 (UK)
1. "Chains of Love" (Truly in Love with the Marks Bros. mix) – 7:20
2. "The Good, the Bad and the Ugly" (The Dangerous mix) (Morricone) – 4:43
3. "Don't Suppose" – 3:27
- 12", Sire / 20953-0 (US)
1. "Chains of Love" (The Unfettered mix) – 8:22
2. "The Good, the Bad, and the Ugly" (Morricone) – 3:15
3. "Chains of Love" (Foghorn mix) – 6:24
4. "Chains of Love" (Truly in Love with the Marks Bros. mix) – 7:20
5. "Don't Suppose" (Country Joe mix) – 5:57
6. "Chains of Love" (Fetter dub dub) – 5:10
- 12", Sire / PRO-A-3186 (US)
1. "Chains of Love" (The Unfettered mix) – 8:22
2. "Chains of Love" (Fetter dub dub) – 5:10
3. "Chains of Love" (Shep Pettibone radio remix – edit) – 3:38
4. "Chains of Love" (Truly in Love with the Marks Bros. mix) – 7:20
5. "Chains of Love" (Shep Pettibone instrumental dub) – 3:50
6. "Chains of Love" (Shep Pettibone radio remix) – 3:56
- CD, Mute / CDMUTE83 (UK)
1. "Chains of Love" (Foghorn mix) – 6:24
2. "The Good, the Bad and the Ugly" (The Dangerous mix) (Morricone) – 4:43
3. "Don't Suppose" (Country Joe mix) – 5:57
- CD, Mute / EBX 2.4 (UK)
1. "Chains Of Love" (remix)
2. "Don't Suppose" – 3:27
3. "Chains of Love" (Foghorn mix) – 6:24
4. "Don't Suppose" (Country Joe mix) – 5:57
5. "The Good, the Bad, and the Ugly" (Morricone) – 3:15
6. "Chains of Love" (Truly in Love with the Marks Bros. mix) – 7:20
7. "The Good, the Bad and the Ugly" (The Dangerous mix) (Morricone) – 4:43

Note: Part of UK CD single box set

- CD, Sire-Reprise / PRO-CD-3140 (US)
1. "Chains of Love" (7" remix) – 3:40
2. "Chains of Love" (Shep Pettibone radio remix) – 3:56
3. "Chains of Love" (The Unfettered mix) – 8:22
4. "Chains of Love" (Truly in Love with the Marks Bros. mix) – 7:20

== Charts ==
=== Weekly charts ===
Chart (1988)	Peak position
Canada Top Singles (RPM)	14
Canada Dance/Urban (RPM)	1
Denmark (IFPI)	3
Ireland (IRMA)	6
Netherlands (Single Top 100)	85
New Zealand (RIANZ)	31
Singapore (Singaporean Singles Chart)	2
Switzerland (Schweizer Hitparade)	16
UK Singles (Official Charts)	11
US Cash Box Top 100	13
US Billboard Hot 100	12
US Hot Dance Club Play (Billboard)	4
US Hot Dance Music/Maxi-Singles Sales (Billboard)	1
US Alternative Airplay (Billboard)	22
West Germany (Media Control Charts)	18

=== Year-end charts ===
Chart (1988)	Position
Canada Dance/Urban (RPM)	7
