= Erasure (duo) =

English synth-pop duo

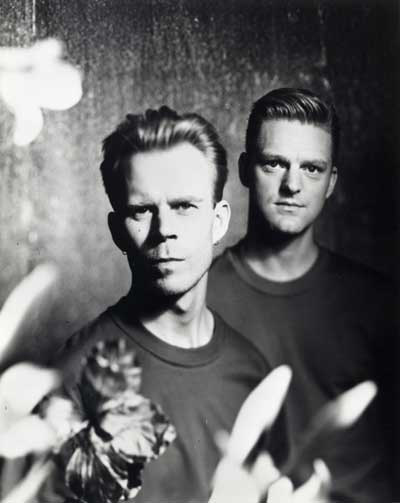
- Vince Clarke (left) and Andy Bell (right) in 1989

Background information
- Origin: London, England
- Genres: Synth-pop; dance-pop; hi-NRG; disco
- Works: Discography
- Years active: 1985–present
- Labels: Mute; Sire; Reprise; Elektra; Maverick; Live Here Now
- Members: Andy Bell; Vince Clarke
- Website: erasureinfo.com

Erasure are an English synth-pop duo formed in London in 1985, consisting of lead vocalist and songwriter Andy Bell and songwriter, producer and keyboardist Vince Clarke, the latter previously a co-founder of the band Depeche Mode and synth-pop duo Yazoo. From their fourth single, "Sometimes" (1986), Erasure established themselves on the UK Singles Chart, becoming one of the most successful acts of the mid-1980s to the mid-1990s. From 1986 to 2007, the pair achieved 24 consecutive top 40 entries in the UK singles chart. By 2009, 34 of their 37 chart-eligible singles and EPs had made the UK top 40, including 17 climbing into the top 10. At the 1989 Brit Awards, Erasure won the Brit Award for Best British Group.

Erasure released their debut album Wonderland in 1986. It did not perform well chart-wise, although one song from the album, "Oh l'amour", later became one of their biggest hits when reissued in 2003 to promote the Hits! The Very Best of Erasure compilation album. With their second album, 1987's The Circus, came major success, the album reaching UK number 6 and spawning four top 20 singles with "Sometimes", "It Doesn't Have to Be", "Victim of Love", and "The Circus". Their third album, 1988's The Innocents, was a number 1, and produced further hit singles with "Ship of Fools", "Chains of Love", and "A Little Respect". It was followed the same year by the Christmas EP Crackers International, which peaked at number 2 and included another of their most popular songs, "Stop!" . The Innocents was the first of five consecutive UK number 1 albums, followed by Wild! (1989), the Mercury Prize nominated Chorus (1991), the compilation Pop! The First 20 Hits (1992), and I Say I Say I Say (1994). Their ABBA tribute EP, Abba-esque (1992), also reached number 1 in the UK. Hit singles from these albums included "Drama!", "Blue Savannah", and "Star" from Wild!, "Chorus", "Love to Hate You", and "Breath of Life" from Chorus, and "Always" and "Run to the Sun" from I Say I Say I Say.

From 1995, the commercial success of Erasure began to fade with the atmospheric album Erasure (1995), then with the mixed success of Cowboy (1997), until the album Loveboat (2000) which almost passed unnoticed. A little later in the 2000s, the duo achieved a commercial rebound in a few European countries thanks to their cover of a Peter Gabriel song, "Solsbury Hill", taken from the covers album Other People's Songs (2003), as well as the UK Top 5 single "Breathe" on the album Nightbird (2005). Subsequently, Erasure began a new commercial decline accentuated by the record crisis: the group's new albums still ranked briefly in the charts.

Overall in their career, Erasure have written more than 200 songs and have sold more than 28 million albums worldwide.

== History ==
=== Origins ===
As a teenager, Vince Clarke was inspired to make electronic music after hearing Wirral synth band Orchestral Manoeuvres in the Dark (OMD). He was a founding member of Depeche Mode and the sole writer of their first three singles, including the breakthrough top 10 single "Just Can't Get Enough". Following their first album Speak & Spell, on which Clarke wrote nine of the eleven songs, he left Depeche Mode at the end of 1981, going on to form another successful act, the synth-pop duo Yazoo (known as Yaz in the United States).

After two successful studio albums in as many years (1982–1983), he split with Yazoo partner Alison Moyet and formed the short-lived project the Assembly with producer Eric Radcliffe. The project spawned a UK number-four single, "Never Never", featuring Feargal Sharkey on lead vocals. After more than a year out of the spotlight, Clarke placed an advertisement in Melody Maker looking for a vocalist for a new musical project. Peterborough-born Andy Bell phoned and got a call back a few days later. Bell practised for the audition listening to Alison Moyet and Siouxsie and the Banshees. It went well, and he was chosen. Around the same time Clarke released a single with vocalist Paul Quinn, "One Day". It flopped, leading Clarke to form Erasure. According to Bell, Clarke had been his "hero".

Erasure's influences include OMD, Kraftwerk, Gloria Gaynor and ABBA.

=== 1985–1994: First recordings and international success ===
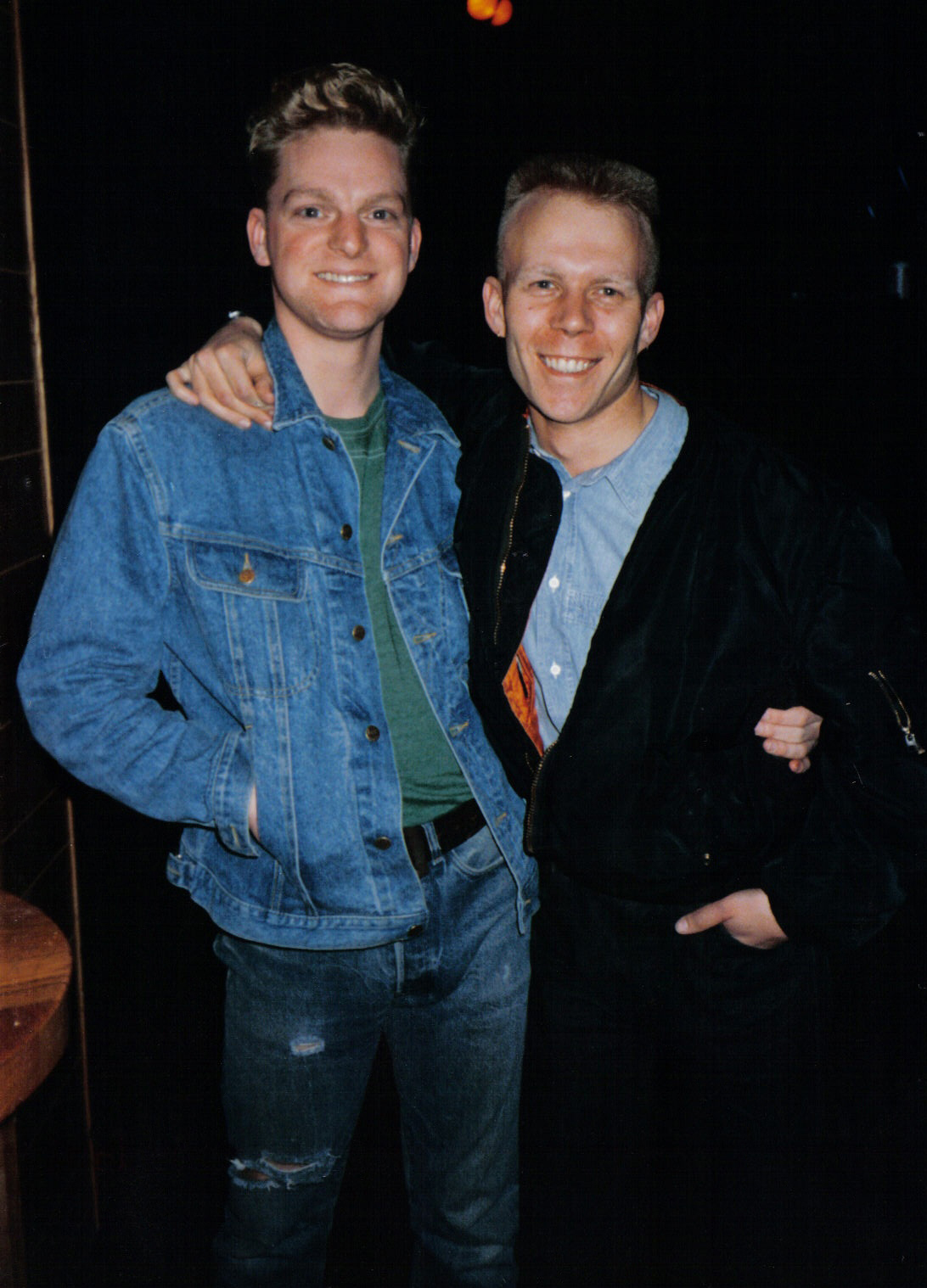
Andy Bell and Vince Clarke in 1986

Erasure's first three singles were commercial failures in the UK, although the third, "Oh l'amour", charted well in Australia, South Africa and a few European countries (especially in France, where it still remains Erasure's only hit to date, and Germany where it was a Top 16 success). Their debut studio album, Wonderland, was mostly recorded in 1985 and released in June 1986. Although it only made the UK top 75, it made a sizeable mark in Germany, reaching the top 20.

It was the release of their fourth single, "Sometimes", which finally received recognition in the UK in late 1986. The song peaked at number 2 in the UK and Germany and spent many weeks in the UK top 40, marking the beginning of a long string of major hits for the duo. The single's parent album, The Circus, was released in March 1987 and reached number 6 and turned platinum in the UK with three additional hit singles: "It Doesn't Have To Be", "Victim of Love", and "The Circus". The album remained on the charts for over a year.

Erasure's third studio album, The Innocents, was released in April 1988. Preceded by the top 10 single "Ship of Fools", the album hit number one in the UK on its initial release and returned to the summit a year later, eventually going double platinum. It also turned platinum in the U.S., generating two top 20 hits in "Chains of Love" and "A Little Respect".

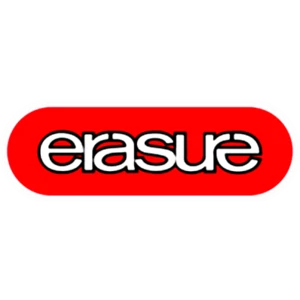
Erasure's logo in 1991, 1992 and 2009

The Innocents was the first of five consecutive number one albums for Erasure in the UK, including the greatest hits compilation Pop! The First 20 Hits. In November 1988, the Crackers International EP, hit number 2 in the UK. The albums Wild! (1989) and Chorus (1991) both contained four top 20 singles and were major sellers.

Crackers International was bettered in 1992 by another EP, Abba-esque, (covering 4 ABBA hits), which became Erasure's first (and to-date only) number one on the UK Singles Chart. It featured a video of the duo dressed in ABBA outfits, and was one of the principal drivers of the ABBA revival scene in the 1990s.

Also in 1990, Erasure contributed the song "Too Darn Hot" to the Cole Porter tribute album Red Hot + Blue produced by the Red Hot Organization. In 1992, a singles compilation, Pop! The First 20 Hits, also hit number one and went triple platinum, featuring all the band's singles released from 1985 to 1992.

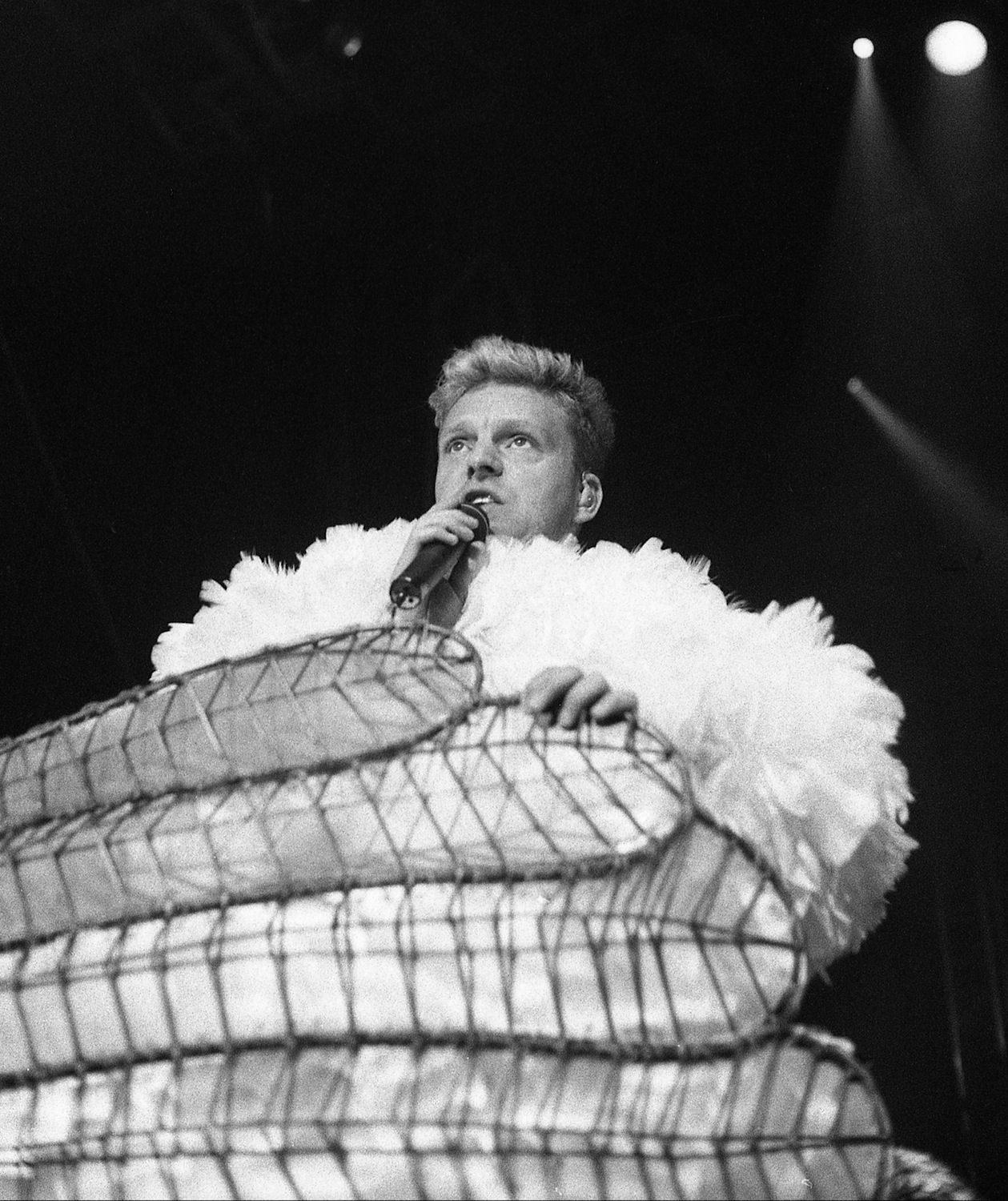
Bell performing live in Magdeburg, Germany, 1992

In 1994, Erasure released I Say I Say I Say, their fifth consecutive number one on the UK Albums Chart. Its first single, "Always", became the band's third top 20 hit in the United States. A second single, "Run to the Sun", was released in July and became their final UK top 10 hit until 2003. "I Love Saturday" was released in November and was the third and final single from the album.

=== 1995–2008: Continued success with more albums ===
The October 1995 release of the studio album Erasure marked a determined shift away from Erasure's signature three-minute synth-pop to a more introspective and experimental sound. Nevertheless, it made the UK top 15 and spawned two UK top 20 singles, "Stay with Me" and "Fingers & Thumbs". A remixed version of "Rock Me Gently" was released only in Germany and the Czech Republic as the third single.

In spite of a return to three-minute pop songs, the 1997 studio album Cowboy did not restore the success of their 1986–1994 era. Cowboy enjoyed a short-lived success, peaking at number 10 in the UK but lasting only two weeks in the UK top 40. In the U.S. Billboard charts though, it was one of their most successful records. The first single "In My Arms" reached number 13 in the UK and entered the top 2 on the U.S. Dance chart. The second single "Don't Say Your Love Is Killing Me" made number 23 in the UK. The third single "Rain" was also only released in Germany and the Czech Republic.

In October 2000, Erasure released their ninth studio album Loveboat, co-produced with Flood, though only peaking at a lowly number 45. The first single was "Freedom", which made a brief entry into the UK top 30. In 2001, they released a limited EP, Moon & the Sky containing new versions of the title song, a cover of the Supremes song "Baby Love" and some acoustic versions of Loveboat songs.

The 2003 release Other People's Songs was a collection of cover versions. Its first single, a cover of Peter Gabriel's song "Solsbury Hill", reached the UK top 10, and Erasure were invited to perform on Top of the Pops for the first time since March 1997. The second single from the album was a cover of Steve Harley's "Make Me Smile (Come Up and See Me)", which made number 14 in the UK. In 2003, a new 'best of' compilation was released, called Hits! The Very Best of Erasure. Included was a new version of the 1986 song "Oh l'amour" — originally a commercial flop in the UK, this new version charted in the top 15.

Erasure's 2005 studio album Nightbird's first single, "Breathe", reached number 4 in the UK charts (their first top 5 hit in more than a decade) and achieved the number one position on the U.S. Dance chart, 18 years after their first chart-topper.

The next single, "Don't Say You Love Me", which made the UK top 15, enabled purchasers to configure their own remixes of the single through the band's website, with each variant of the song limited to a single download. The third single was a double A-side, featuring new versions of "Here I Go Impossible Again"/"All This Time Still Falling Out of Love".

Union Street was a 2006 side-project which featured a collection of previously released album tracks that the band re-interpreted in an acoustic and country & western style. The album was named after the recording studio in Brooklyn where it was recorded.

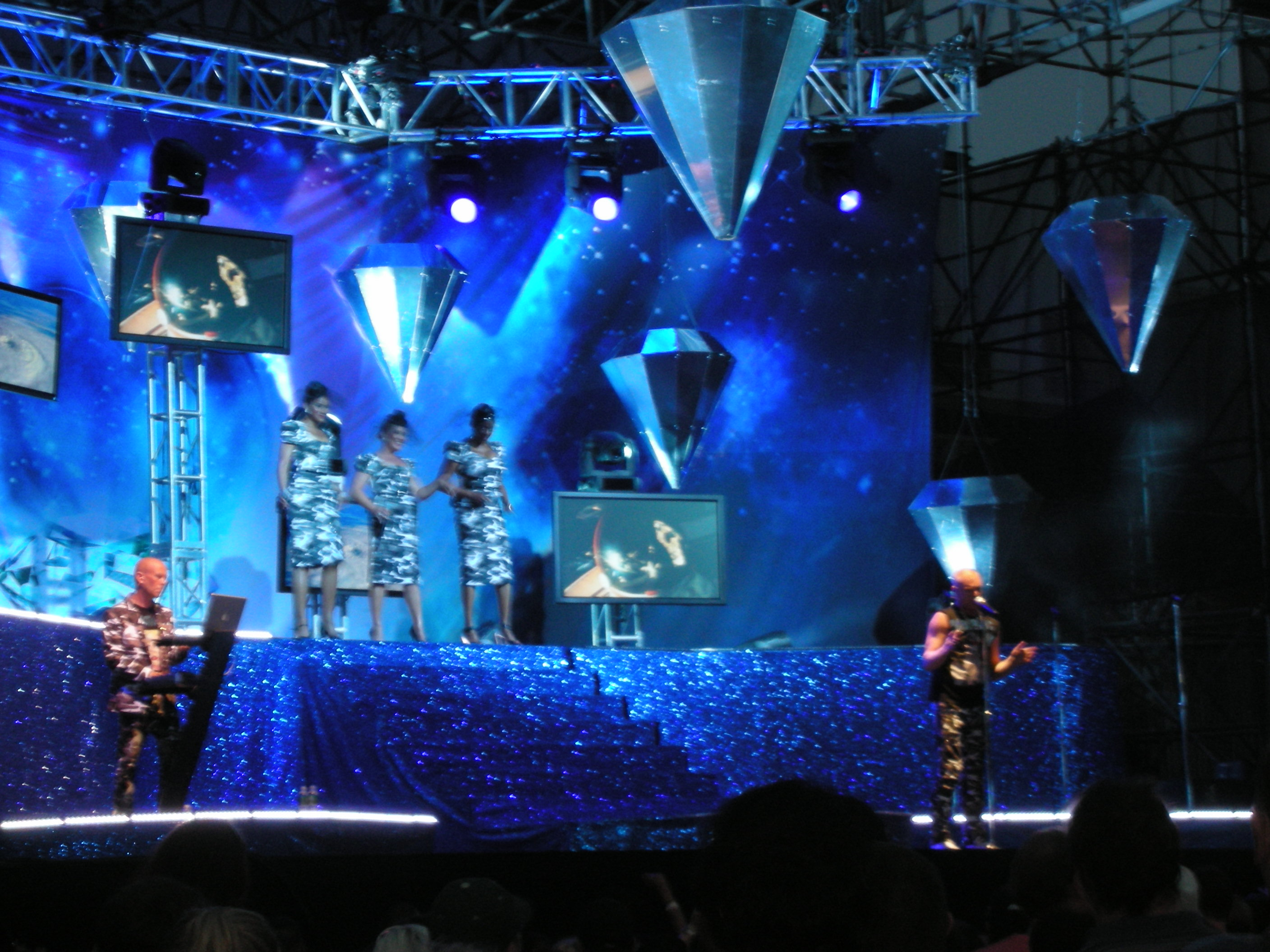
Erasure in concert in Brooklyn in 2007

The duo then released a more 'dance-oriented' album than some of their more recent work. Titled Light at the End of the World, the album was produced by Gareth Jones and was released on 21 May 2007 in the UK, and in North America the following day. The album was preceded by its first single "I Could Fall in Love with You", which peaked at number 21 in the UK. A second single, "Sunday Girl", was released in June and made number 33 in the UK. The album was supported by the Light at the End of the World Live tour. The Storm Chaser EP included an exclusive B-side, "Early Bird", a duet with Cyndi Lauper.

=== 2009–2019: Releases ===
Total Pop! The First 40 Hits, a collection of Erasure's first 40 hits plus a new remix of "Always" by Jeremy Wheatley, was released on 23 February 2009. The compilation fractionally missed the UK top 20, reaching number 21.

On 10 August 2009, Erasure released a six-track EP of classic remixes entitled Erasure.Club.

To celebrate 21 years since its release, the album The Innocents (1988) was remastered and re-released on 26 October 2009.

Andy Bell released his second solo studio album, Non-Stop, on 7 June 2010.

In February and March 2010, the song "Always" enjoyed an unexpected peak of popularity among flash-game players for its prominent role as the soundtrack of the Adult Swim game Robot Unicorn Attack.

Vince Clarke stated in radio interviews that the band wanted to complete the concept album of nursery rhymes that they had been working on for some time. On 16 December 2010, Erasure's official website announced a new studio album planned for release in summer 2011 to be produced by Frankmusik. Also, a world tour was announced (including the Ultra Music Festival in Miami, Florida in March 2011 and the Total Pop! Forest Tour of the UK in June and July 2011) with dates including stops in Europe and South America.

Erasure played a 27-date US and Canada tour, as well as at Estadio Monumental "U" in Lima, Peru on 18 August. The Tomorrow's World Tour began on 31 August 2011 in Tampa, continuing through September, and finished in Seattle on 6 October 2011. The UK and European leg of the Tomorrow's World tour began on 12 October 2011 in Leicester, UK, continuing through to 14 November 2011 in Dresden, Germany.

A music video of the Erasure song "Fill Us with Fire"

On 20 June 2011, it was confirmed via their official website that their new studio album was to be called Tomorrow's World. This album was released on 3 October 2011 (11 October 2011 in the US). The first single from the album was "When I Start To (Break It All Down)". The album reached number 29 in the UK, number 35 in Germany and number 61 in the US. The second single from Tomorrow's World, "Be with You", peaked in the top 10 on the US Hot Dance Club Songs chart, making it their highest peak since "Breathe" in 2005. The third and final single from the album, "Fill Us with Fire" was released on 12 March 2012.

Erasure toured internationally in 2011; it was one of their longest tours and included visits to some places for the first time, including Russia and Ukraine. They also did a whole South American Tour, including two shows in Buenos Aires, where they last performed in 1997 during the Cowboy Tour.

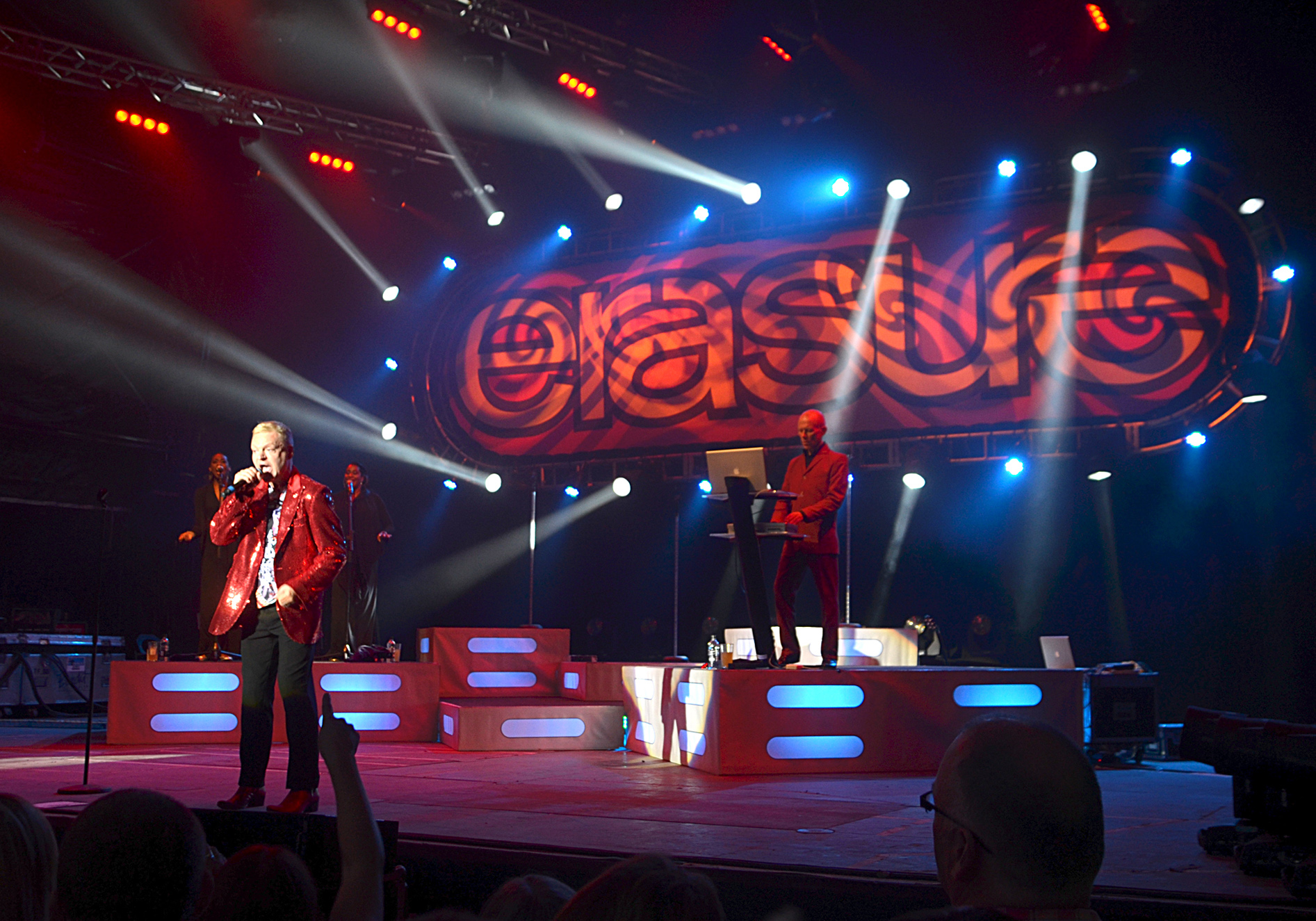
Vince Clarke and Andy Bell onstage, 2011

On 11 November 2013, Erasure released their first Christmas album, Snow Globe. The first single from the album was a cover of the 1973 Steeleye Span track "Gaudete" which was available as a digital download from 28 October, in advance of the single's full release as a CD and download bundle on 9 December. The track was available in the US on 29 October.

On 27 May 2014, Erasure announced their sixteenth studio album for a September 2014 release, a 10-track record titled The Violet Flame. Released on 22 September 2014 and produced by Richard X, it entered the UK Albums Chart at number 20, giving the duo their first top 20 album since Other People's Songs in 2003.

In October 2015, in order to celebrate their 30 years in the music industry, Erasure released an updated version of "Sometimes" as a single and a new compilation album entitled Always: The Very Best of Erasure. Release dates were 23 October and 30 October 2015.

On 29 July 2016, Erasure announced that they would be continuing their special series of releases to mark their 30th anniversary with the autumn release of an anthology box-set entitled From Moscow to Mars.

On 23 February 2017, Erasure announced that their seventeenth studio album would be titled World Be Gone and would be released via Mute on 19 May 2017. To mark the release, the band would headline three UK shows at Glasgow's O_{2} Academy Glasgow on 27 May 2017, Manchester's Albert Hall on 28 May 2017 and London's Roundhouse on 29 May 2017 before embarking on a four-month European tour as special guests of Robbie Williams in June, July, August and September.

In March 2018, the album World Beyond was announced, a re-recording of Erasure's previous year's World Be Gone in a post-classical garb. It was recorded in ten days by Andy Bell and seven musicians from the Brussels-based ensemble Echo Collective. Erasure's album World Beyond then debuted at No. 1 on the Billboard Classical Albums and Classical Crossover Albums charts dated 24 March 2018.

=== 2020–present: The Neon, Day-Glo, and Radio!! Radio!! ===
On 21 August 2020, Erasure released their eighteenth studio album, The Neon. The album reached number 4 in the UK and was their highest placed album in the UK charts for 26 years. The Neon was preceded by the single "Hey Now (Think I Got a Feeling)", which was first heard on BBC Radio 2's The Zoe Ball Breakfast Show. The band stated that they tried to go back to their original sounds. Clarke used some of his older synthesizers and Bell described the new album as "going back to the beginning".

On 13 May 2021, Erasure announced the release of "Secrets", a new single available as a one-track stream or download ahead of a new album, The Neon Remixed. The album, a two-disc set of remixes from their eighteenth album, was released on 30 July and also included the single "Secrets". It charted on the UK Albums Chart in August 2021 at number 33, with a sales total of 2,255 units and became Erasure's 23rd hit on the UK Albums Chart. The band played a twelve venue tour of the UK in October 2021.

In June 2022, Erasure announced the release of their nineteenth studio album, Day-Glo (Based on a True Story), which was stated as being a follow-up to the previous release The Neon (2020). It was released on 12 August 2022.

Erasure will release their twentieth studio album, Radio!! Radio!!, on 12 March 2027. The album's first single, "Wings of Love", was released in September 2026. A new arena tour across the UK and Europe is set to commence in late April 2027, featuring special guest Ladytron for the UK dates. Vince Clarke will serve as musical director from California rather than appearing live on stage alongside Bell.

== Musical style ==
Erasure's music has been described as electropop, synth-pop, dance-pop, hi-NRG, disco, and new wave. According to Stephen Thomas Erlewine of AllMusic, the group's style, like Vince Clarke's previous groups Depeche Mode and Yazoo, is "synth-based, but with stronger, more house-oriented dance inclinations, as well as a sharp, accessible sense of pop songcraft". The Washington Post wrote that Erasure's music "combines synth-pop, disco, cabaret, light opera and a bit of English choirboy sound." In a 1991 feature for NME, Stuart Maconie described their music as "exuberantly camp disco pop".

== Discography ==
- Wonderland (1986)
- The Circus (1987)
- The Innocents (1988)
- Wild! (1989)
- Chorus (1991)
- I Say I Say I Say (1994)
- Erasure (1995)
- Cowboy (1997)
- Loveboat (2000)
- Other People's Songs (2003)
- Nightbird (2005)
- Union Street (2006)
- Light at the End of the World (2007)
- Tomorrow's World (2011)
- Snow Globe (2013)
- The Violet Flame (2014)
- World Be Gone (2017)
- The Neon (2020)
- Day-Glo (Based on a True Story) (2022)
- Radio!! Radio!! (2027)

== Awards and nominations ==
Year	Awards	Work	Category	Result	Ref.
1986	Billboard Music Awards	Themselves	Top Dance Club Play Artist	Nominated	
1986	Billboard Music Awards	"Oh l'amour"	Top Dance Club Play Single	Nominated	
1987	Billboard Music Awards	Themselves	Top Dance Club Play Artist	Nominated	
1987	Billboard Music Awards	"Victim of Love"	Top Dance Club Play Single	Nominated	
1988	Billboard Music Awards	"Chains of Love"	Top Dance Sales Single	Nominated	
1989	Ivor Novello Awards	"A Little Respect"	Best Contemporary Song	Nominated	
1989	Brit Awards	Themselves	Best British Group	Won	
1989	Smash Hits Poll Winners Party	Themselves	Best Group	Nominated	
1990	Smash Hits Poll Winners Party	Themselves	Best Group	Nominated	
1990	Smash Hits Poll Winners Party	Wild!	Best LP	Nominated	
1990	Smash Hits Poll Winners Party	Andy Bell	Most Fanciable Male	Nominated	
1990	Brit Awards	Themselves	Best British Group	Nominated	
1991	Ivor Novello Awards	"Blue Savannah"	Most Performed Work	Won	
1992	Mercury Prize	Chorus	Album of the Year	Nominated	
1992	Brit Awards	"Love to Hate You"	British Video of the Year	Nominated	
1993	Brit Awards	"Take a Chance on Me"	British Video of the Year	Nominated	
1993	Brit Awards	Themselves	British Group	Nominated	
1993	Hungarian Music Awards	Themselves	Concert of the Year by a foreign artist	Nominated	
1993	Pollstar Concert Industry Awards	Tour	Small Hall Tour of the Year	Nominated	
1993	Pollstar Concert Industry Awards	Tour	Most Creative Stage Production	Nominated	
1994	Smash Hits Poll Winners Party	"Always"	Best Pop Video	Nominated	
1994	Goldene Europa Awards	Themselves	Best International Group	Won	
1994	Cash Box Year-End Awards	Themselves	Top Alternative Crossover Artist	Nominated	
1998	GLAAD Media Awards	Cowboy	Outstanding Music Artist	Nominated	
2015	Classic Pop Readers' Awards	The Violet Flame	Album of the Year	Won	
2015	AIM Independent Music Awards	Themselves	Best Live Act	Nominated	
2017	AIM Independent Music Awards	From Moscow to Mars	Special Catalogue Release of the Year	Nominated	
2017	Attitude Awards	Themselves	Icon Award	Won	
2018	AIM Independent Music Awards	Themselves	Best Live Act	Won	
2019	Classic Pop Readers' Awards	Themselves	Live Act of the Year	Won	
2020	Classic Pop Readers' Awards	Wild!	Reissue of the Year	Nominated	
2023	British LGBT Awards	Andy Bell	Lifetime Achievement	Won	
