= Ship of Fools (Erasure song) =

Single by Erasure

from the album The Innocents
- B-side: "When I Needed You"; "River Deep, Mountain High"
- Released: 22 February 1988
- Recorded: 1988
- Genre: Synth-pop
- Length: 4:01
- Label: Mute
- Songwriters: Vince Clarke; Andy Bell
- Producers: Stephen Hague; Dave Jacob

Erasure singles chronology
"The Circus" (1987)	"Ship of Fools" (1988)	"Chains of Love" (1988)

Music video
- "Ship of Fools" on YouTube

Professional ratings
Review scores
Source	Rating
Number One	2/5 stars

"Ship of Fools" is a song by English synth-pop duo Erasure, released in February 1988 by Mute as the lead single from their third studio album, The Innocents (1988). The song was written by Vince Clarke and Andy Bell, and produced by Stephen Hague and Dave Jacob. It peaked at number six on the UK Singles Chart, and was the duo's eighth single overall and their fourth UK Top 10 single. The music video for the song was directed by Phillip Vile.

== Critical reception ==
Ian Gittins from Melody Maker said, "Well over the usual Erasure HiNRG yelp. Andy Bell's shrill defiance grates, jogging up and down with upful glee and tiresomely obvious. But here, for once, they make contact. "Ship of Fools" has great hooks like a lump in the throat which he levers round, lost in a rich sound all about regret and wry sorrow. For once not clear what he's singing about, and I'm really not bothered. Touching." Colin Irwin from Number One wrote, "Memorable in a tooth-achey kind of way and not a patch on 'Circus' which was at least disguised in brightness and light. And Andy Bell still sounds exactly like Alison Moyet." Eleanor Levy of Record Mirror described "Ship of Fools" as Erasure "at their most open, melodic and beautiful". She added, "If there's one voice guaranteed to make the old erogenous zones come over all a-quiver it's Andy Bell's when he gets all throaty and emotional like this."

Ro Newton from Smash Hits named it Single of the Fortnight, writing, "'Ship of Fools' is first and foremost a song, not a load of sterile bumps and clicks cobbed together in the way that some of the records on the charts are at the moment. It also happens to be very soothing with the quavery tones of Andy Bell fluttering away softly while Vince Clarke provides a strong orchestral backing with loads of swirly strings and other "subtle" things. I actually think this is rather wonderful and just the thing for the more sensitive souls among us to sip our Horlicks to!"

== Retrospective response ==
In a 2007 review, the Daily Vault's Michael R. Smith commented, "My only complaint about 'Ship of Fools' is that Andy [Bell] chooses to sing in a lower register. Whenever he does this, it makes the song sound like a warped record; his voice was always as its best in the more comfortable range of falsetto." In 2014, Chris Gerard from Metro Weekly described it as a "dramatic ballad" that showed a completely different side of Erasure. He also noted that it featured Bell's "finest vocal yet", and "showed significant artistic growth for the duo."

== Music video ==
A music video was filmed to promote the single, directed by Phillip Vile.

== Track listings ==
- 7" single (MUTE74)
1. "Ship of Fools"
2. "When I Needed You"
- 12" single (12MUTE74)
1. "Ship of Fools" (Shiver Me Timbers Mix)
2. "River Deep, Mountain High" (Warm Depths Mix)
3. "When I Needed You" (Melancholic Mix)
- Limited 12" single (L12MUTE74)
1. "Ship of Fools" (RC Mix)
2. "River Deep, Mountain High" (Private Dance Mix)
3. "When I Needed You"
- CD single (CDMUTE74)
1. "Ship of Fools" (Shiver Me Timbers Mix)
2. "When I Needed You" (Melancholic Mix)
3. "River Deep, Mountain High" (Private Dance Mix)

== Charts ==
=== Weekly charts ===
Chart (1988)	Peak position
Austria (Hitradio Ö3)	17
Denmark (IFPI)	7
Europe (Eurochart Hot 100)	13
Ireland (IRMA)	6
Italy Airplay (Music & Media)	1
South Africa (Springbok Radio)	11
Switzerland (Schweizer Hitparade)	12
UK Singles (OCC)	6
West Germany (GfK)	9

=== Year-end charts ===
Chart (1988)	Position
West Germany (Media Control)	44
