= Mark Saunders (music producer) =

- Born: London, England
- Genres: Rock; pop; electronic; alternative
- Occupations: Record producer; mixer; audio engineer
- Years active: 1981–present
- Website: Official website

Mark Saunders is an English record producer, mixer and audio engineer. Known for his work with artists such as John Lydon, The Cure, Erasure, and Tricky, Saunders has played a key role in the production of numerous hit albums and singles, particularly during the 1980s and 1990s.

== Early life and career ==
Saunders was born in London and began his career in the music industry in 1981. He initially worked as an audio engineer at Westside Studios in London, where he collaborated with producer Clive Langer and engineer Alan Winstanley on numerous projects.

His work as an assistant and later as an engineer on critically acclaimed albums such as Too-Rye-Ay by Dexys Midnight Runners and Madness albums helped him hone his skills. By the mid-1980s, Saunders transitioned into production and mixing, eventually becoming a sought-after name in the music industry.

== Notable collaborations ==
Mark Saunders has worked with a wide range of notable artists across multiple genres:

- The Cure – Wish
- Erasure – The Innocents
- Tricky – Maxinquaye
- John Lydon - Psycho's Path
- David Bowie – The Buddha of Suburbia (remixes)
- Depeche Mode – Songs of Faith and Devotion (remixes)
- Shakespears Sister – Hormonally Yours
- Neneh Cherry – Homebrew
- Cyndi Lauper – Hat Full of Stars and Sisters of Avalon
- Echo & the Bunnymen – Evergreen
- Coldcut – What's That Noise?
- Marilyn Manson – Smells Like Children (remixes)
- Adam Ant – Manners & Physique
