= Mute Records discography =

The following is a list of items with recorded Mute Records catalogue numbers, starting with label founder Daniel Miller's single as The Normal.

The discography is broken down by singles with a Mute catalogue number and albums with a Stumm catalogue number. Best of collections feature a Mutel catalogue number.

Through the years, various bands have been awarded their own personalised catalogue numbers, including Yazoo, Inspiral Carpets (through the purchase of the Cow Records imprint) and Depeche Mode, the most prolific of the three for the label. Depeche Mode's singles, starting with "Leave in Silence", were issued with a Bong catalogue number.

== Singles ==
=== Mute 1 - 100 ===
- Mute 1 - "T.V.O.D./Warm Leatherette", The Normal (November 1978) [7”, CD]
- Mute 2 - "Back to Nature", Fad Gadget (October 1979) [7”]
- Mute 3 - "Memphis Tennessee", Silicon Teens (August 1979) [7”]
- Mute 4 - "Judy in Disguise", Silicon Teens (January 1980) [7”]
- Mute 5 - "Kebabträume", Deutsch-Amerikanische Freundschaft (March 1980) [7”]
- Mute 6 - "Ricky's Hand", Fad Gadget (March 1980) [7”]
- Mute 7 - "Soundtracks 1-5/Can't Look Straight/Flashcards", Non/Smegma (1980) [7”]
- Mute 8 - "Just Like Eddie/Sun Flight", Silicon Teens (July 1980) [7”]
- Mute 9 - "Insecticide/Fireside Favourite", Fad Gadget (September 1980) [7”]
- Mute 10 - "Double Heart/On Location", Robert Rental (1980) [7”]
- Mute 11 - "Tanz mit mir/Der Räuber und der Prinz", Deutsch-Amerikanische Freundschaft (October 1980) [7”]
- Mute 12 - "Make Room/Lady Shave", Fad Gadget (March 1981) [7”]
- Mute 13 - "Dreaming of Me", Depeche Mode (February 1981) [7”, CD]
- Mute 14 - "New Life", Depeche Mode (June 1981) [7”, 12”, CD]
- Mute 15 - "Rise", NON (1982) [12”]
- Mute 16 - "Just Can't Get Enough", Depeche Mode (September 1981) [7”, 12”, CD]
- Mute 17 - "Saturday Night Special", Fad Gadget (January 1982) [7”]
- Mute 18 - "See You", Depeche Mode (January 1982) [7”, 12”, CD]
- Mute 19 - "Fred vom Jupiter", Die Doraus und die Marinas (1982) [7”]
- Mute 20 - "Only You", Yazoo (1982) [7”, 12”, CD]
- Mute 21 - "King of the Flies", Fad Gadget (April 1982) [7”]
- Mute 22 - "The Meaning of Love", Depeche Mode (April 1982) [7”, 12”, CD]
- Mute 23 - "Los Ninos Del Parque", Liaisons Dangereuses (1982) [7”]
- Mute 24 - "Life on the Line", Fad Gadget (September 1982) [7”, 12”]
- Mute 25 - "Or So it Seems", Duet Emmo (1983) [12”]
- Mute 26 - "For Whom the Bell Tolls", Fad Gadget (January 1983) [7”, 12”]
- Mute 27 - "Mit Dir", Robert Görl (1983) [7”, 12”]
- Mute 28 - "I Discover Love", Fad Gadget (October 1983) [7”, 12”]
- Mute 29 - "Mutiny! (EP)", The Birthday Party (1983) [12”]
- Mute 30 - "Collapsing New People", Fad Gadget (January 1984) [7”, 12”]
- Mute 31 - "Darling Don't Leave Me", Robert Görl (1984) [7”, 12”]
- Mute 32 - "In the Ghetto", Nick Cave and the Bad Seeds (1984) [7”]
- Mute 33 - "One Man's Meat", Fad Gadget (May 1984) [7”, 12”]
- Mute 34 - "Letters to a Friend", I Start Counting (1984) [7”, 12”]
- Mute 35 - "Still Smiling", I Start Counting (1985) [7”, 12”]
- Mute 36 - "The Dangling Man", Crime & the City Solution (1985) [12”]
- Mute 37 - "Hypnotized", Mark Stewart (1985) [7”, 12”]
- Mute 38 - "Tupelo", Nick Cave and the Bad Seeds (1985) [7”]
- Mute 39 - "Luxury", Frank Tovey (1985) [7”, 12”]
- Mute 40 - "Who Needs Love Like That", Erasure (1985) [7”, 12”, L12", CD]
- Mute 41 - "Only One I", He Said (1985) [7”, 12”]
- Mute 42 - "Heavenly Action", Erasure (1985) [7”, 12”, L12", CD]
- Mute 43 - "Pump", He Said (1986) [7”, 12”]
- Mute 44 - "Luddite Joe", Frank Tovey (1986) [7”, 12”]
- Mute 45 - "Oh l'amour", Erasure (1986) [7”, 12”, L12", CD]
- Mute 46 - "The Kentucky Click/Adventure", Crime & The City Solution (1986) [12”]
- Mute 47 - "The Singer", Nick Cave and the Bad Seeds (1986) [7”, 12”]
- Mute 48 - "Pale Feet/Pulling 3gs", He Said (1986) [7”, 12”]
- Mute 49 - "Catch That Look", I Start Counting (1986) [7”, 12”]
- Mute 50 - "Just Talk", A.C. Marias (1986) [12”]
- Mute 51 - "Sometimes", Erasure (1986) [7”, 12”, L12", C, CD]
- Mute 52 - "The Mercy Seat", Nick Cave and the Bad Seeds (1988) [7”, 12”, CD]
- Mute 53 - "Snakedrill", Wire (1986) [12”]
- Mute 54 - "My Translucent Hands", I Start Counting (1987) [7”, 12”]
- Mute 55 - "Whippets", Holger Hiller (1987) [12”]
- Mute 56 - "It Doesn't Have To Be", Erasure (1987) [7”, D7", 12”, L12", Go-pak CD, CD]
- Mute 57 - "Ahead", Wire (1987) [7”, 12”]
- Mute 58 - "Let Your Body Learn", Nitzer Ebb (1987) [7”, 12”]
- Mute 59 - "This Is Stranger Than Love", Mark Stewart + Maffia (1987) [7”, 12”]
- Mute 60 - "Geburt Einer Nation", Laibach (1987) [12”]
- Mute 61 - "Victim of Love", Erasure (1987) [7”, 12”, L12", C, CD]
- Mute 62 - "Life Is Life", Laibach (1987) [7”, 12”]
- Mute 63 - "Marry Me (Lie! Lie!)", These Immortal Souls (1987) [12”]
- Mute 64 - "Join In The Chant", Nitzer Ebb (1987) [7”, 12”]
- Mute 65 - "Dirty Sings", Anita Lane (1988) [12”]
- Mute 66 - "The Circus", Erasure (1987) [7”, 12” (1), 12” (2), 12” (3), CD]
- Mute 67 - "Kidney Bingos", Wire (1988) [7”, 12”, CD]
- Mute 68 - "Immobilise", Mkultra (1987) [12”]
- Mute 69 - "Lose Him", I Start Counting (1988) [7”, 12”, L12"]
- Mute 70 - "Time Was", A.C. Marias (1988) [7”, 12”]
- Mute 71 - "Control I'm Here", Nitzer Ebb (1988) [7”, 12”, L12", CD]
- Mute 72 - "The Three", Ohi Ho Bang Bang (1989) [12”, CDV]
- Mute 73 - "Could You?", He Said (1988) [7”, 12”]
- Mute 74 - "Ship of Fools", Erasure (1988) [7”, 12”, L12", CD]
- Mute 75 - "Double-Barrel Prayer", Diamanda Galás (1988)
- Mute 76 - "On Every Train (Grain Will Bear Grain]", Crime & The City Solution (1988) [12”]
- Mute 77 - "The Man with the Golden Arm", Barry Adamson (1988) [12”, CD]
- Mute 78 - "Hearts & Minds", Nitzer Ebb (1989) [12”, L12", CD]
- Mute 79 - "Bridge Street Shuffle", Frank Tovey (1988) [12”]
- Mute 80 - "Sympathy for the Devil", Laibach (1988)
- Mute 81 - "Ra! Ra! Rawhide", I Start Counting (1988) [7”, 12”, L12"]
- Mute 82 - "Biting My Nails", Renegade Soundwave (1988)
- Mute 83 - "Chains of Love", Erasure (1988) [7”, 12”, L12", CD]
- Mute 84 - "Silk Skin Paws", Wire (1988) [7”, 12”, CD]
- Mute 85 - "A Little Respect", Erasure (1988) [7”, 7” postcard pack, 12”, L12", CD]
- Mute 86 - "Deanna", Nick Cave and the Bad Seeds (1988) [12”]
- Mute 87 - "Eardrum Buzz", Wire (1989) [7”, 12”, L12", CD]
- Mute 88 - "The Phantom", Renegade Soundwave (1988)
- Mute 89 - "Drama!", Erasure (1989) [7”, 12”, L12", C, CD, LCD]
- Mute 90 - "King of California", These Immortal Souls (1992) [12”, CD]
- Mute 91 - "Across the Universe", Laibach (1988)
- Mute 92 - "Hysteria", Mark Stewart (1990)
- Mute 93 - "Crackers International (EP)", Erasure (1988) [7”, 12”, L12", CD, LCD Christmas card, LCD]
- Mute 94 - "The Shadow of No Man", Crime & The City Solution (1989) [12”]
- Mute 95 - "Million Headed Monster", I Start Counting (1989) [12”, CD]
- Mute 96 - "Shame", Nitzer Ebb (1989) [7”, 12”, L12", CD]
- Mute 97 - "The Taming of the Shrewd", Barry Adamson (1989) [12”, CD]
- Mute 98 - "In Vivo", Wire (1989)
- Mute 99 - "You Surround Me", Erasure (1989) [7”, 12”, L12" XL12"] (Supernature), [C, CD, LCD]
- Mute 100 - "Sam Hall", Frank Tovey (1989) [12”, CD]

=== Mute 101 - 200 ===
- Mute 101 - "Machineries of Joy", Die Krupps (1989) [12”, L12"]
- Mute 102 - "Probably a Robbery", Renegade Soundwave (1990) [7”, 12”, C, CD]
- Mute 103 - "Los Niños Del Parque", Liaisons Dangereuses (1990) [12”, CD]
- Mute 104 - " Space Gladiator / Phantom", Renegade Soundwave (1989)
- Mute 105 - "One of Our Girls (Has Gone Missing)", A.C. Marias (1990) [12”, CD]
- Mute 106 - "Lightning Man", Nitzer Ebb (1990) [12”, L12", CD]
- Mute 107 - "So & Slow it Grows", Wir (1991)
- Mute 108 - "The Ship Song", Nick Cave and the Bad Seeds (1990) [7”, 12”, CD]
- Mute 109 - "Blue Savannah", Erasure (1990) [7”, 12”, L12", XL12", XXl12", C, CD, LCD]
- Mute 110 - "Faith Healer", Recoil (1992) [7”, 12”, C, CD]
- Mute 111 - "Star", Erasure (1990) [7”, 12”, L12", C, CD]
- Mute 112 - "Biting My Nails", Renegade Soundwave (1990)
- Mute 113 - "Crazy Earth", Fortran 5 (1990) [12”, L12"]
- Mute 114 - "I Have the Gun", Crime & The City Solution (1990) [12”, CD]
- Mute 115 - "Fun To Be Had / Getting Closer", Nitzer Ebb (1990) [12”, L12", CD]
- Mute 116 - "Wirtschaft ist Tot", Laibach (1992)
- Mute 117 - "Final Countdown", Laibach (1994)
- Mute 118 - "The Weeping Song", Nick Cave and the Bad Seeds (1990) [7”, 12”, CD]
- Mute 119 - "These Boots Are Made for Walking", Barry Adamson & Anita Lane (1991) [7”, 12”, CD]
- Mute 120 - "Love Baby / Midnight Trip", Fortran 5 (1990) [12”, L12"]
- Mute 121 - "The Liberty Tree", Frank Tovey (1991) [7”, 12”, CD]
- Mute 122 - "As Is EP", Nitzer Ebb (1991) [7”, 12”, L12", CD]
- Mute 123 - "Gush Forth My Tears", Miranda Sex Garden (1991)
- Mute 124 - "Thunder II", Renegade Soundwave (1990)
- Mute 125 - "Chorus", Erasure (1991) [7”, 12”, C, CD]
- Mute 126 - "Groove", Fortran 5 (1991) [12”, CD]
- Mute 127 - "The Dolphins & The Sharks", Crime & The City Solution (1991) [10”, CD]
- Mute 128 - "Honky's Ladder EP", Afghan Whigs (1996)
- Mute 129 - "Heart on the Line", Fortran 5 (1991) [7”, 12”, CD]
- Mute 130 - "Dream Kitchen", Mark Stewart (1996) [12”, CD]
- Mute 131 - "Love to Hate You", Erasure (1991) [7”, 12”, C, CD]
- Mute 132 - "Ab Ovo", Bruce Gilbert (1996)
- Mute 133 - "I Give To You", Nitzer Ebb (1991) [7”, 10”, 12”, CD]
- Mute 134 - "Am I Right?", Erasure (1991) [7”, 12”, L12", C, CD, LCD]
- Mute 135 - "Godhead", Nitzer Ebb (1991) [12” (1), 12” (2), CD (1), CD (2)]
- Mute 136 - "Look to the Future", Fortran 5 (1992) [7”, 12”, CD]
- Mute 137 - "Kray Twins", Renegade Soundwave (1992)
- Mute 138 - "Cocaine Sex", Renegade Soundwave (1992)
- Mute 139 - "Play", Miranda Sex Garden (1993)
- Mute 140 - "Straight to You/Jack the Ripper", Nick Cave and the Bad Seeds (1992) [7”, L7", 12”, CD]
- Mute 141 - "There Can Only Be One", Simon Bonney (1992)
- Mute 142 - "Breath of Life", Erasure (1992) [7”, 12”, C, CD]
- Mute 143 - "Time To Dream", Fortran 5 (1993) [7”, 12”, CD]
- Mute 144 - "Abba-esque (EP)", Erasure (1992) [7”, 12”, L12", C, CD, LCD]
- Mute 145 - "Ascend", Nitzer Ebb (1992) [10” (1), 10” (2), C, CD]
- Mute 146 - "Renegade Soundwave", Renegade Soundwave (1994)
- Mute 147 - "Women Respond to Bass", Renegade Soundwave (1992)
- Mute 148 - "I Had a Dream Joe", Nick Cave and the Bad Seeds (1992) [7”, 12”, CD]
- Mute 149 - "Cinema Is King", Barry Adamson (1992) [CD]
- Mute 150 - "Who Needs Love Like That (Hamburg Mix)", Erasure (1992) [7”, 12”, C, CD, LCD]
- Mute 151 - "What a Wonderful World", Nick Cave and the Bad Seeds with Shane MacGowan (1992) [7”, 12”, CD]
- Mute 152 - "Always", Erasure (1994) [7”, 12”, C, CD, LCD]
- Mute 153 - "Run to the Sun", Erasure (1994) [7”, 12”, C, CD, LCD]
- Mute 154 - "Sunshine", Miranda Sex Garden (1993)
- Mute 155 - "Kick It", Nitzer Ebb (1995) [12”, CD, LCD, XLCD]
- Mute 156 - "Push for the Love of Life", Parallax (1993)
- Mute 157 - "Persian Blues", Fortran 5 (1993) [12”, CD]
- Mute 158 - "Move", Moby (1993)
- Mute 159 - "Bullet Proof Zero", Parallax (1993)
- Mute 160 - "Do You Love Me?", Nick Cave and the Bad Seeds (1994) [7”, 12”, CD]
- Mute 161 - "Hymn", Moby (1994)
- Mute 162 - "Big Red Balloon", Spell (1993)
- Mute 163 - "Peepshow", Miranda Sex Garden (1994)
- Mute 164 - "I Thought", Nitzer Ebb (1995) [12”, CD, LCD]
- Mute 165 - "Brixton", Renegade Soundwave (1995)
- Mute 166 - "I Love Saturday", Erasure (1994) [12”, C, CD, EPCD, LCD]
- Mute 167 - "Don't Walk Away From Love", Simon Bonney (1996)
- Mute 168 - "Dun' Like a Kipper", Hoodwink (1997)
- Mute 169 - "Loverman", Nick Cave and the Bad Seeds (1994) [7”, 12”, CD]
- Mute 170 - "In the Army Now/War", Laibach (1995)
- Mute 171 - "Do You Take This Man?", Diamanda Galás with John Paul Jones (1994)
- Mute 172 - "Red Right Hand", Nick Cave and the Bad Seeds (1994) [7”, 12”, CD]
- Mute 173 - "Feeling So Real", Moby (1994)
- Mute 174 - "Stay with Me", Erasure (1995) [12”, C, CD, LCD]
- Mute 175 - "Komputer EP", Komputer (1996) [12”, CD]
- Mute 176 - "Everytime You Touch Me", Moby (1995)
- Mute 177 - "The World's a Girl", Anita Lane (1995)
- Mute 178 - "Fingers & Thumbs (Cold Summer's Day)", Erasure (1995) [12”, C, CD, LCD]
- Mute 179 - "Into the Blue", Moby (1995)
- Mute 180 - "Rock Me Gently", Erasure (1996)
- Mute 181 - "Go Further", Armed Response (1995)
- Mute 182 - "Positive ID", Renegade Soundwave (1996)
- Mute 183 - "Movieology", Barry Adamson (1995) [12”]
- Mute 184 - "That's When I Reach for My Revolver", Moby (1996)
- Mute 185 - "Where the Wild Roses Grow", Nick Cave and the Bad Seeds with Kylie Minogue (1995) [7”, 12”, CD]
- Mute 186 - "The Big Bamboozle EP", Barry Adamson (1995) [CD]
- Mute 187 - "Initials B.B.", Mick Harvey (1995) [7”, CD]
- Mute 188 - "Can't Get Loose", Barry Adamson (1998) [12”, CD]
- Mute 189 - "Henry Lee", Nick Cave with PJ Harvey (1996) [7”, 12”, CD]
- Mute 190 - "In My Arms", Erasure (1997) [12”, C, CD, LCD]
- Mute 191 - "Trip from the Hip", Hoodwink (1997)
- Mute 192 - "Into My Arms", Nick Cave and the Bad Seeds (1997) [7”, 12”, CD]
- Mute 193 - "Mouthful of Pennies", Toenut (1996)
- Mute 194 - "Harley Davidson", Mick Harvey and Anita Lane (1996) [7”, CD]
- Mute 195 - "Don't Say Your Love Is Killing Me", Erasure (1997) [12”, C, CD, LCD]
- Mute 196 - "Adamantine", Thirty Ought Six (1996)
- Mute 197 - "God Is God", Laibach (1996)
- Mute 198 - "On My Own", Peach (1996) [12”, C, CD]
- Mute 199 - "Going to Town", Afghan Whigs (1996)
- Mute 200 - "Come on Baby", Moby (1996)

=== Mute 201 - 300 ===
- Mute 201 - "From this Moment on", Peach (1996) [12”, C, CD]
- Mute 202 - "2 Kindsa Love", Jon Spencer Blues Explosion (1996)
- Mute 203 - "Looking Down on London", Komputer (1996) [12”, CD]
- Mute 204 - "Wail", Jon Spencer Blues Explosion (1997)
- Mute 205 - "Made in Vain", Peach (1997) [12”, CD]
- Mute 206 - "(Are You) The One that I've Been Waiting For", Nick Cave and the Bad Seeds (1997) [7”, 12”, CD]
- Mute 207 - "Test Anxiety", Toenut (1997)
- Mute 208 - "Rain", Erasure (1997), [12”, CD]
- Mute 209 - "Drifting", Recoil (1997) [12”, CD]
- Mute 210 - "James Bond Theme (Moby's re-version)", Moby (1997)
- Mute 211 - "More Millionaires", Hoodwink (1998)
- Mute 212 - "Valentina", Komputer (1998) [12”, CD]
- Mute 213 - "Consumed - The Remix Wars", Mark Stewart (1998)
- Mute 214 - "Stalker"/"Missing Piece", Recoil (1998) [12”]
- Mute 215 - "On My Own (Reissue)", Peach (1998) [12”, CD]
- Mute 216 - "Sorrow Town", Peach (1998) [12”, L12", CD]
- Mute 217 - "Little Black Rocks in the Sun", Add N to (X) (1997)
- Mute 218 - "Honey", Moby (1998)
- Mute 219 - "What it Means", Barry Adamson (1998) [12”, CD]
- Mute 220 - "Terminus", Komputer (1998) [12”, CD]
- Mute 221 - "Run On", Moby (1999)
- Mute 222 - "Magical Colours", Jon Spencer Blues Explosion (1998)
- Mute 223 - "Black Amour", Barry Adamson (2002) [12”, CD]
- Mute 224 - "Metal Fingers in My Body", Add N to (X) (1999)
- Mute 225 - "Bodyrock", Moby (1999)
- Mute 226 - "Talk About the Blues", Jon Spencer Blues Explosion (1999)
- Mute 227 - "Food Music", Appliance (1999)
- Mute 228 - "Chirpy", Komputer (2008) (promo only)
- Mute 229 - "Pacifica", Appliance (1999)
- Mute 230 - "Why Does My Heart Feel So Bad?", Moby (1999)
- Mute 231 - "Revenge of the Black Regent", Add N to (X) (1999)
- Mute 232 - "Strange Hours", Recoil (2000) [CD]
- Mute 233 - "Jezebel", Recoil (2000) [CD]
- Mute 234 - "Agartha-The City of Shamballa", Afrika Bambaataa & Westbam (1999)
- Mute 235 - "Hilary, Last of the Pool Sharks", Slick Sixty (1999)
- Mute 236 - "Beatbox Rocker", Westbam (1999)
- Mute 237 - "Frances Says the Knife Is Alive", Echoboy (1999) [10”, CD]
- Mute 238 - "Eyes Open", SFT (1999)
- Mute 239 - "Heavy", Jon Spencer Blues Explosion (1999)
- Mute 240 - "Total Eclipse of the Sun", Einstürzende Neubauten (1999)
- Mute 241 - "Tanz mit Laibach", Laibach (2003)
- Mute 242 - "Constantinople", Echoboy (2000) [12”]
- Mute 243 - "D4", Appliance (2000)
- Mute 244 - "Freedom", Erasure (2000)
- Mute 245 - "A Gentle Cycle Revolution", Appliance (2001)
- Mute 246 - "Kit and Holly", Echoboy (2000) [7”, CD]
- Mute 247 - "Lovely Head", Goldfrapp (2000) [12”, CD]
- Mute 248 - "Moon & the Sky", Erasure (2001)
- Mute 249 - "As I Sat Sadly by Her Side", Nick Cave and the Bad Seeds (2001) [10”, CD]
- Mute 250 - "Solitude", Non (2000) [7”]
- Mute 251 - "Natural Blues", Moby (2000)
- Mute 252 - "Porcelain", Moby (2000)
- Mute 253 - "Utopia", Goldfrapp (2000) [12”, CD]
- Mute 254 - "Plug Me In", Add N to (X) (2000)
- Mute 255 - "Why Does My Heart Feel So Bad?/Honey feat. Kelis", Moby (2000)
- Mute 256 - "Telstar Recovery", Echoboy (2000) [12”, CD]
- Mute 257 - "Turning On", Echoboy (2001) [12”, L12", CD]
- Mute 258 - "The Poker Roll", Add N to (X) (2001)
- Mute 259 - "Human", Goldfrapp (2001) [12”, CD]
- Mute 260 - "The Next Man That I See", Anita Lane (2001)
- Mute 261 - "Nothing at All", Luke Slater (2002)
- Mute 262 - "Fifteen Feet of Pure White Snow", Nick Cave and the Bad Seeds (2001) [10”, CD]
- Mute 263 - "She Said", Jon Spencer Blues Explosion (2002)
- Mute 264 - "Utopia (Genetically Enriched)", Goldfrapp (2001) [12”, CD, LCD]
- Mute 265 - "Bring It On", Nick Cave and the Bad Seeds (2003) [10”, CD]
- Mute 266 - "Land, Sea and Air", Appliance (2001)
- Mute 267 - "Pilots (On A Star)", Goldfrapp (2001) [CD, LCD]
- Mute 268 - "We Are All Made of Stars", Moby (2002)
- Mute 269 - "Fireside Favourite"/"Collapsing New People", Fad Gadget (2001) [12”]
- Mute 270 - "Extreme Ways", Moby (2002)
- Mute 271 - "Sweet and Sour", Jon Spencer Blues Explosion (2002)
- Mute 272 - "Stars and Heroes", Luke Slater (2002)
- Mute 273 - "The Snare", Looper (2002)
- Mute 274 - "She's a Knife", Looper (2002)
- Mute 275 - "Solsbury Hill", Erasure (2003) [CD, LCD, DVD]
- Mute 276 - "In This World", Moby (2002)
- Mute 277 - "Automatic Eyes", Echoboy (2003) [7”, CD]
- Mute 278 - "Take Me to Your Leader", Add N to (X) (2002)
- Mute 279 - "45/45", Pole (2003)
- Mute 280 - "Sunday (The Day Before My Birthday)", Moby (2003)
- Mute 281 - "The Nasty Show", Pink Grease (2003)
- Mute 282 - "Rough Trade Shops Electronic 01", Various (2004)
- Mute 283 - "Whispering Streets", Barry Adamson (2002) [12”, CD]
- Mute 284 - "Love Letter", Nick Cave and the Bad Seeds (2002)
- Mute 285 - "Do That Thing", Anita Lane (2002)
- Mute 286 - "Go Native", Appliance (2003)
- Mute 287 - "I Can Complete You", Luke Slater (2002)
- Mute 288 - "Shakin' Rock'n'Roll Tonight", Jon Spencer Blues Explosion (2002)
- Mute 289 - "Rough Trade Shops Rock'n'Roll", Various (2002)
- Mute 290 - "He Wants You/Babe, I'm on Fire", Nick Cave and the Bad Seeds (2003) [10”, CD]
- Mute 291 - "Train", Goldfrapp (2003) [12”, CD, LCD]
- Mute 292 - "Make Me Smile (Come Up and See Me)", Erasure (2003) [CD, LCD, DVD]
- Mute 293 - "Lately Lonely", Echoboy (2003) [7”, CD]
- Mute 294 - "Dirty Sticky Floors", Dave Gahan (2003)
- Mute 295 - "Strict Machine", Goldfrapp (2003) [CD, LCD, DVD]
- Mute 296 - "Stardust", Martin L Gore (2003) [12”, CD, DVD]
- Mute 297 - "Mountaineers", Mountaineers (2003) [10”, CD]
- Mute 298 - "Rough Trade Shops Post Punk 1", Various (2003)
- Mute 299 - "90/90", Pole (2003)
- Mute 300 - "Ripen", Mountaineers (2003) [7”, CD]

=== Mute 301 - 400 ===
- Mute 301 - "I Need You", Dave Gahan (2003)
- Mute 302 - "Jam for the Ladies", Moby vs. Princess Superstar (2003)
- Mute 303 - "Everyday It's 1989 / The Stars", Moby (2007) [12”]
- Mute 304 - "Fever", Pink Grease (2004)
- Mute 305 - "Shake the Dope Out", The Warlocks (2003)
- Mute 306 - "Jam for the Ladies promo", Moby vs. Princess Superstar (2003)
- Mute 307 - "Light Is in Your Eyes", Voodoo Child (2003)
- Mute 308 - "Baby Blue", The Warlocks (2003)
- Mute 309 - "Take it Home", Voodoo Child (2003)
- Mute 310 - "Bottle Living", Dave Gahan (2003)
- Mute 311 - "Twist", Goldfrapp (2004)
- Mute 312 - "Oh L'amour", Erasure (2003)
- Mute 313 - "Good on TV", Echoboy (2003) [7”, CD]
- Mute 314 - "Come Save Us", The Warlocks (2005)
- Mute 315 - "I Gotta Sing", Mountaineers (2003)
- Mute 316 - "The Pink G.R. Ease", Pink Grease (2004)
- Mute 317 - "There's Always Room on the Broom", Liars (2004)
- Mute 318 - "Rock of Gibraltar", Nick Cave and the Bad Seeds (2003)
- Mute 319 - "Das Spiel ist aus", Laibach (2004)
- Mute 320 - "Black Cherry", Goldfrapp (2004)
- Mute 321 - "We Fenced Other Gardens With the Bones of Our Own", Liars (2004)
- Mute 322 - "Loverman EP^{2}", Martin L Gore (2003)
- Mute 323 - "Predator EP", Modey Lemon (2004)
- Mute 324 - "Nature Boy", Nick Cave and the Bad Seeds (2004)
- Mute 325 - "Strip", Pink Grease (2005)
- Mute 326 - "3 Mount View", Mountaineers (2004) (DVD only)
- Mute 327 - "Burn it Off", Blues Explosion (2004)
- Mute 328 - "Crows", Modey Lemon (2004)
- Mute 329 - "Breathless / There She Goes, My Beautiful World", Nick Cave and the Bad Seeds (2004) [7”, CD]
- Mute 330 - "Breathe", Erasure (2005)
- Mute 331 - "Sleepwalkers", Modey Lemon (2004)
- Mute 332 - "Hot Gossip", Blues Explosion (2004)
- Mute 333 - "Make Love Fuck War", Moby and Public Enemy (2004)
- Mute 334 - "It's Just Like Surgery", The Warlocks (2005)
- Mute 335 - "Strict Machine 04", Goldfrapp (2004) [12”, L12”, CD, LCD, DVD]
- Mute 336 - "Crunchy", Blues Explosion (2005)
- Mute 337 - "Don't Say You Love Me", Erasure (2005)
- Mute 338 - "Rough Trade Shops Indiepop 1", Various (2004)
- Mute 339 - "Get Ready for Love", Nick Cave and the Bad Seeds (2005)
- Mute 340 - "Lift Me Up", Moby (2005)
- Mute 341 - "Bucket Of Butterflies", Modey Lemon (2005)
- Mute 342 - "Ooh La La", Goldfrapp (2005)
- Mute 343 - "Peaches", Pink Grease (2005)
- Mute 344 - "Here I Go Impossible Again / All This Time Still Falling Out of Love", Erasure (2005)
- Mute 345 - "Raining Again", Moby (2005)
- Mute 346 - "Out of Time Man", Mick Harvey (2007) download only
- Mute 347 - "The Ocean", Richard Hawley (2005)
- Mute 348 - "Trans Slovenia Express Vol.2: The Club Mixes", Various (2005)
- Mute 349 - "It Fit When I Was a Kid", Liars (2005)
- Mute 350 - "Spiders", Moby (2005)
- Mute 351 - "Number 1", Goldfrapp (2006)
- Mute 352 - "Coles Corner", Richard Hawley (2005)
- Mute 353 - "Down In The Past", Mando Diao (2005)
- Mute 354 - "The Other Side of Mt. Heart Attack", Liars (2006)
- Mute 355 - "Dream About Me", Moby (2005)
- Mute 356 - "Ride a White Horse", Goldfrapp (2006)
- Mute 357 - "Just Like the Rain", Richard Hawley (2006)
- Mute 358 - "Ordinary Girl", Pink Grease (2006)
- Mute 359 - "Boy", Erasure (2006)
- Mute 360 - "Beautiful", Moby (2005)
- Mute 361 - "Fly Me Away", Goldfrapp (2006)
- Mute 362 - "Born Under a Bad Sign", Richard Hawley (2006)
- Mute 363 - "Alien", Pink Grease (2006)
- Mute 364 - "Anglia", Laibach (2006)
- Mute 365 - "Slipping Away", Moby (2006)
- Mute 366 - "I Could Fall in Love with You", Erasure (2007)
- Mute 367 - "Coles Corner", Richard Hawley (2006)
- Mute 368 - "Satin Boys, Flaming Chic", Goldfrapp (2006)
- Mute 369 - "Carlights", Pink Grease (2007)
- Mute 370 - "Get It On", Grinderman (2007)
- Mute 371 - "New York, New York", Moby (2006)
- Mute 372 - "Prey", Recoil (2007)
- Mute 373 - "No Pussy Blues", Grinderman (2007)
- Mute 374 - "Headphones and Ringtones", Komputer (2007)
- Mute 375 - "It Will Find You", Maps (2007)
- Mute 376 - "Sunday Girl", Erasure (2007)
- Mute 377 - "Dig, Lazarus, Dig!!!", Nick Cave and The Bad Seeds (2008)
- Mute 378 - "You Don't Know Her Name", Maps (2007)
- Mute 379 - "Hotel Room", Richard Hawley (2007)
- Mute 380 - "Alice", Moby (2008)
- Mute 381 - "(I Don't Need You to) Set Me Free", Grinderman (2007)
- Mute 382 - "Tonight The Streets Are Ours", Richard Hawley (2007)
- Mute 383 - "Plaster Casts Of Everything", Liars (2007)
- Mute 384 - "Storm Chaser", Erasure (2007)
- Mute 385 - "Serious", Richard Hawley (2007)
- Mute 386 - "House Clouds", Liars (2007)
- Mute 387 - "Disco Lies", Moby (2008)
- Mute 388 - "Valentine", Richard Hawley (2008)
- Mute 389 - "A&E", Goldfrapp (2008)
- Mute 390 - "More News From Nowhere", Nick Cave and The Bad Seeds (2008)
- Mute 391 - "I Love To Move In Here", Moby (2008)
- Mute 392 - "Happiness", Goldfrapp (2008)
- Mute 393 - "Kingdom", Dave Gahan (2007)
- Mute 394 - "Like a Bird", Komputer (2007) [7”]
- Mute 395 - "Hey Mr. DJ", Tiny Masters of Today (2007) [7”, CD]
- Mute 396 - "To the Sky", Maps (2007)
- Mute 397 - "Hologram World", Tiny Masters of Today (2008) [7”, CD]
- Mute 398 - "Saw Something / Deeper and Deeper", Dave Gahan (2008)
- Mute 399 - "Nitrogen Pink", Polly Scattergood (2007) [10”]
- Mute 400 - "I Hate The Way", Polly Scattergood (2008) [10”]

=== Mute 401 - 500 ===
- Mute 401 - "Caravan Girl", Goldfrapp (2008) [CD, DVD]
- Mute 402 - "Rockabilly Radio (from the film 'Flick')", Richard Hawley and The Feral Cats (2008)
- Mute 403 - "Midnight Man", Nick Cave and The Bad Seeds (2008) [7”, CD]
- Mute 404 - "How to Reduce the Chances of Becoming a Terror Victim", XX Teens (2008)
- Mute 405 - "Pop! Remixed", Erasure (2009) [CD]
- Mute 406 - The Way We Were", XX Teens (2008)
- Mute 407 - "Disco Lies", Moby (2008) UK release
- Mute 408 - "Only You"", XX Teens (2008)
- Mute 409 - "Ooh Yeah", Moby (2008)
- Mute 410 -
- Mute 411 - "Skeletons", Tiny Masters of Today (2009)
- Mute 412 - "Other Too Endless", Polly Scattergood (2009) [CD]
- Mute 413 - "Please Don't Touch", Polly Scattergood (2009) [Download]
- Mute 414 - "Pop Chart", Tiny Masters of Today (2009)
- Mute 415 - "I Dream Of Crystal", Maps (2009) [12”]
- Mute 416 - "In Your Heart", A Place To Bury Strangers (2009) [Download]
- Mute 417 - "For Your Lover Give Some Time", Richard Hawley (2009)
- Mute 418 - "Real Good", Tiny Masters of Today (2009)
- Mute 419 - "Bunny Club EP", Polly Scattergood (2009) [Download]
- Mute 420 - "Phantom Bride EP", Erasure (2009) [CD]
- Mute 421 - "Die Happy, Die Smiling", Maps (2010) [Download]
- Mute 422 - "Keep Slipping Away", A Place To Bury Strangers (2009)
- Mute 423 - "Open Up Your Door", Richard Hawley (2009)
- Mute 424 -
- Mute 425 - "Percussion Gun", White Rabbits (2010)
- Mute 426 - "Will You Be There?", MiMó / Andy Bell (2010)
- Mute 427 - "Ambling Alp", Yeasayer (2009)
- Mute 428 - "Scissor", Liars (2010)
- Mute 429 - "They Done Wrong / We Done Wrong", White Rabbits (2010)
- Mute 430 - "Rocket", Goldfrapp (2010) [CD]
- Mute 431 - "Call on Me", Andy Bell (2010) [CD]
- Mute 432 - "Alive", Goldfrapp (2010) [7”]
- Mute 433 - "Ego Death EP", A Place To Bury Strangers (2010)
- Mute 434 - "The Overachievers", Liars (2010) [Download]
- Mute 435 - "O.N.E.", Yeasayer (2010)
- Mute 436 - "Believer", Goldfrapp (2010) [CD]
- Mute 437 - "False Lights From The Land EP", Richard Hawley (2010)
- Mute 438 - "I Lived My Life to Stand in the Shadow of Your Heart EP", A Place To Bury Strangers (2010) [Download]
- Mute 439 - "Madder Red", Yeasayer (2010)
- Mute 440 - "End Blood", Yeasayer (2011)
- Mute 441 - "Heathen Child", Grinderman (2010) [12”]
- Mute 442 - "15 Years", Pull in Emergency (2010)
- Mute 443 - "The Salesman (Tramp Life)", White Rabbits (2010)
- Mute 444 - "Proud Evolution", Liars (2012) [Download]
- Mute 445 - "Non-Stop", Andy Bell (2010) [CD]
- Mute 446 - "The Problem", Pull in Emergency (2011)
- Mute 447 - "Worm Tamer", Grinderman (2010) [12”]
- Mute 448 - "End Blood", Yeasayer (2011)
- Mute 449 - "Palaces of Montezuma", Grinderman (2011) [12”]
- Mute 450 - "Sweetheart I Ain't Your Christ / Country Dumb", Josh T. Pearson (2011) [12”]
- Mute 451 - "A Little Respect (HMI Redux)", Erasure (2010) [Download]
- Mute 452 - "Mickey Mouse and the Goodbye Man", Grinderman (2011) [12”]
- Mute 453 - "Amber Hands", S.C.U.M (2011) [12”]
- Mute 454 - "Whitechapel", S.C.U.M (2011) [12”]
- Mute 455 - "Woman When I've Raised Hell", Josh T. Pearson (2011)
- Mute 456 - "Famous Last Words", Mick Harvey (2011)
- Mute 457 - "Ash / Black Veil", Apparat (2011)
- Mute 458 - "Liliputt", Beth Jeans Houghton & The Hooves of Destiny (2011) [7”]
- Mute 459 - "Chair", Big Deal (2011) [7”]
- Mute 460 - "Song of Los", Apparat (2011) [12”]
- Mute 461 - "Faith Unfolds", S.C.U.M (2012) [Download]
- Mute 462 - "Distant Neighborhood", Big Deal (2011) [7”]
- Mute 463 - "Candil de la Calle", Apparat (2012)
- Mute 464 - "When I Start To (Break It All Down)", Erasure (2011) [CD]
- Mute 465 - "Sorry With a Song", Josh T. Pearson (2011)
- Mute 466 - "Black Water" Apparat (2011)
- Mute 467 - "Monuments", Yann Tiersen (2011) [7”]
- Mute 468 - "I'm Gonna Live Anyhow", Yann Tiersen (2011) [7”]
- Mute 469 - "Sweet Tooth Bird", Beth Jeans Houghton & The Hooves of Destiny (2012) [7”]
- Mute 470 - "Be With You", Erasure (2011) [CD]
- Mute 471 - "Big Deal EP", Big Deal (2011)
- Mute 472 - "Faith Unfolds", S.C.U.M. (2012) [Download]
- Mute 473 - "Talk", Big Deal (2012) [Download]
- Mute 474 - "Atlas", Beth Jeans Houghton & The Hooves of Destiny (2012) [7”]
- Mute 475 - "EP1/Spock", VCMG (2011) [12”]
- Mute 476 - "EP2/Single Blip", VCMG (2012) [12”]
- Mute 477 - "Immigrant Song", Karen O With Trent Reznor And Atticus Ross (2012)
- Mute 478 - "Amber Hands", S.C.U.M (2012) [12”]
- Mute 479 - "Fill Us With Fire", Erasure (2012) [CD]
- Mute 480 -
- Mute 481 - "Transverse V2/V3 Edits", Carter Tutti Void (2012)
- Mute 482 - "Hector/Post-Operative #8" [7”] / "Dancing Coins EP" [12”], Cold Specks (2012)
- Mute 483 - "Big Deal Vs S.C.U.M", Big Deal / S.C.U.M. (2012) [7”]
- Mute 484 - "EP3/Aftermaths", VCMG (2012) [12”]
- Mute 485 - "Blank Maps/Winter Solstice", Cold Specks (2012) [7”]
- Mute 486 - "No.1 Against the Rush", Liars (2012) [12”]
- Mute 487 - "Temporary", White Rabbits (2012)
- Mute 488 - "Henrietta", Yeasayer (2012)
- Mute 489 -
- Mute 490 - "Longevity", Yeasayer (2012)
- Mute 491 - "Dodecahedron", Beth Jeans Houghton & The Hooves of Destiny (2012) [Download]
- Mute 492 - "Dodecahedron", Beth Jeans Houghton & The Hooves of Destiny (2012) [7”]
- Mute 493 - "I'm Not Me", White Rabbits (2012)
- Mute 494 - "Reagan's Skeleton", Yeasayer (2012)
- Mute 495 - "Brats", Liars (2012) [12”]
- Mute 496 - "Goddess", Crime & The City Solution (2013) [Download]
- Mute 497 - "When The City Lights Dim", Cold Specks (2012)
- Mute 498 - "Wanderlust", Polly Scattergood (2013) [Download]
- Mute 499 - "I Heard Them Say", Maps (2013) [12”]
- Mute 500 - "In Your Car", Big Deal (2013) [Download]

=== Mute 501 - 600 ===
- Mute 501 - "Cocoon", Polly Scattergood (2013) [Download]
- Mute 502 - "Subsequently, Lost", Polly Scattergood (2014) [Download]
- Mute 503 - "A.M.A.", Maps (2013)
- Mute 504 - "Dream Machines", Big Deal (2013) [7”]
- Mute 505 - "A.M.A.", Maps (2013) [12”]
- Mute 506 - "You Will Find a Way", Maps (2013) [Download]
- Mute 507 - "Swapping Spit", Big Deal (2013)
- Mute 508 - "S", Laibach (2013)
- Mute 509 - "Gaudete", Erasure (2013) [CD]
- Mute 510 - "Make It Wonderful", Erasure (2014) [CD]
- Mute 511 - "Mess on a Mission", Liars (2014) [12”]
- Mute 512 - "Thea", Goldfrapp (2014) [Download]
- Mute 513 - "In Your Car / Catch Up", Big Deal (2014)
- Mute 514 - "Venter", Ben Frost (2014)
- Mute 515 - "A Midsummer Evening", Yann Tiersen (2014)
- Mute 516 - "A Little God in My Hands", Swans (2014)
- Mute 517 - "Pro Anti Anti", Liars (2014) [12”]
- Mute 518 - "Were You There? feat. Neil Tennant", Diamond Version (2014) [Download]
- Mute 519 - "Sakura EP", Big Deal (2014)
- Mute 520 - "Absisto", Cold Specks (2014)
- Mute 521 - "Dangerous Days", Zola Jesus (2014)
- Mute 522 - "Elevation", Erasure (2014) [CD]
- Mute 523 - "Bodies at Bay", Cold Specks (2014)
- Mute 524 - "Thievery", Arca (2014)
- Mute 525 - "V A R I A N T", Ben Frost (2014)
- Mute 526 - "I'm No Gold", Liars (2014)
- Mute 527 - "Go (Blank Sea)", Zola Jesus (2014)
- Mute 528 - "Reason", Erasure (2014) [CD]
- Mute 529 - "Oxygen", Swans (2014)
- Mute 530 - "EX Club Mixes", Plastikman (2015)
- Mute 531 - "Swans", Swans (2015) (Originally released on Labor Records 1982)
- Mute 532 - "Sacred", Erasure (2015) [CD]
- Mute 533 - "Hunger", Zola Jesus (2015)
- Mute 534 - "Black Flag", Du Blonde (2015)
- Mute 535 - "Europa Hymn", MG (2015) [Download]
- Mute 536 - "Living Signs", Cold Specks (2015)
- Mute 537 -
- Mute 538 - "MG EP", MG (2015) [12”]
- Mute 539 - "Europa Hymn (Andy Stott Remix)" / "Pinking 'Christoffer Berg Remix)", MG (2015) [Download]
- Mute 540 - "Blackbird", On Dead Waves (2015) [Download]
- Mute 541 - "Restless", New Order (2015) [12”, CD]
- Mute 542 - "Tutti Frutti", New Order (2015) [12”, CD]
- Mute 543 - "Sometimes 2015", Erasure (2015) [CD]
- Mute 544 - "Nail", Zola Jesus (2015)
- Mute 545 - "Singularity", New Order (2016) [12”, CD]
- Mute 546 - "I Am Chemistry", Yeasayer (2016)
- Mute 547 - "I&I", LUH (2016)
- Mute 548 - "Porz Goret", Yann Tiersen (2015)
- Mute 549 - "I&I / Lost Under Heaven", LUH (2016) [12”]
- Mute 550 - "Blue Inside", On Dead Waves (2016) [Download]
- Mute 551 -
- Mute 552 - "California", On Dead Waves (2016) [Download]
- Mute 553 - "People on the High Line", New Order (2016) [7”, 12”, CD]
- Mute 554 - "Beneath the Concrete", LUH (2016) [Download]
- Mute 555 - "Blackbird EP", On Dead Waves (2016) [Download]
- Mute 556 - "Cold Night", Yeasayer (2016)
- Mute 557 - "Anymore", Goldfrapp (2017) [Download]
- Mute 558 - "Lament", LUH (2016) [Download]
- Mute 559 - "Threshold of Faith", Ben Frost (2017)
- Mute 560 - "They're Just Words", ADULT. (2017)
- Mute 561 - "Farfisa Song", Looper (2017)
- Mute 562 - "Love You to the Sky", Erasure (2017) [CD]
- Mute 563 - "Falling From Cloud 9 (XFM Session)", Lift to Experience (2017)
- Mute 564 - "Systemagic / Anymore", Goldfrapp (2017) [Download]
- Mute 565 - "World Be Gone", Erasure (2017) [CD]
- Mute 566 - "Just a Little Love", Erasure (2017) [CD]
- Mute 567 - "VARIATIONS: Detroit House Guests", ADULT. (2017)
- Mute 568 -
- Mute 569 - "All That You Love Will Be Eviscerated", Ben Frost (2018)
- Mute 570 - "Everything Is Never Enough", Goldfrapp (2017) [Download]
- Mute 571 - "Novembergrey", Chris Liebing (2018) [Download]
- Mute 572 - "I love you... nor do I (Je t'aime... moi non plus)", Mick Harvey (2018) [Download]
- Mute 573 - "A Love Song (Set Me Straight)", Josh T. Pearson (2018)
- Mute 574 - "Dirty Boy", A Certain Ratio (2018) [Download]
- Mute 575 - "Detroit House Guests The Remixes", ADULT. (2017)
- Mute 576 - "AfterParty" ShadowParty (2018) [Download]
- Mute 577 - "Agnes Varda - Gleaning Truths Original Soundtrack", Daniel Blumberg feat. Tom Wheatley & Billy Steiger (2018)
- Mute 578 - "Family", Daniel Blumberg (2018)
- Mute 579 - "Iona (Jlin Rework)", Ben Frost (2017)
- Mute 580 - "Chemistry Lessons Volume 1.1 - Coursework", Chris Carter (2018) [12”]
- Mute 581 - "Variables - 1976", Chris Carter (2018)
- Mute 582 - "Klavierstuck V", Irmin Schmidt (2018)
- Mute 583 - "QUANTA 1", KÁRYYN (2018) [Download]
- Mute 584 - "QUANTA 11", KÁRYYN (2018) [Download]
- Mute 585 - "QUANTA 1:11" KÁRYYN (2018) [Download]
- Mute 586 - "QUANTA 11:11", KÁRYYN (2018) [Download]
- Mute 587 - "Moving Masses", KÁRYYN (2018) [Download]
- Mute 588 -
- Mute 589 - "And All Went Dark (Goldfrapp Remix)", Chris Liebing featuring Polly Scattergood (2018) [Download]
- Mute 590 - "Tilt", KÁRYYN feat. Young Paint (2019) [Download]
- Mute 591 - "Marigold", ShadowParty (2019) [Download]
- Mute 592 -
- Mute 593 -
- Mute 594 -
- Mute 595 - 'Houses in Motion", A Certain Ratio (2019) [Download]
- Mute 596 - "BRANDENBURG (Stimming Remix)", Apparat (2019)
- Mute 597 - "HEROIST (Edit)", Apparat (2019)
- Mute 598 -
- Mute 599 - "Dirty Boy / Shack Up (Remixed)", A Certain Ratio (2019) [12”]
- Mute 600 -

=== Mute 601 - 700 ===
- Mute 601 -
- Mute 602 -
- Mute 603 -
- Mute 604 - "LP5_RMXS", Apparat (2019) [12"]
- Mute 605 - "Party Songs", Laibach (2019) [12”]
- Mute 606 - "Love Will Come (Maps' Brave New Version)", Maps (2021) [Download]
- Mute 607 - "Stillness / Cytokinesis (Instrumental)", AIRSPACE (2019)
- Mute 608 - "Systems Up, Windows Down", HAAi (2019) [12”]
- Mute 609 - "Burn Slow Remixes Pt. I", Chris Liebing (2020) [Download]
- Mute 610 - "Burn Slow Remixes Pt. II", Chris Liebing (2020) [Download]
- Mute 611 - "Put Your Head Above the Parakeets", HAAi (2020) [12”]
- Mute 612 - "Silver As It Was Before", Sylph (2021) [12”]
- Mute 613 - "Ancient Hole", Sylph (2021) [12”]
- Mute 614 - "Warm Leatherette Re-Covered", Various Artists (2020) [12”]
- Mute 615 - "Friends Around Us (Part 1 and 2)", A Certain Ratio (2020) [7”]
- Mute 616 - "Lagniappe Session", Yann Tiersen (2020) [12”]
- Mute 617 - "Hey Now (Think I Got a Feeling)", Erasure (2020) [CD]
- Mute 618 - "Higher Up the Spiral", Nicolas Bougaieff (2020) [Download]
- Mute 619 - "Be a Rebel", New Order (2020) [12”, L12", 2x12", CD]
- Mute 620 -
- Mute 621 - "Berlin", A Certain Ratio" (2020) [7”]
- Mute 622 - "Shadow of Funk", Cabaret Voltaire (2021) [12”]
- Mute 623 - "Shot a Satellite (Initial Talk Remix)", Erasure (2020) [Download]
- Mute 624 - "Nerves of Steel", Erasure (2020) [CD]
- Mute 625 - "Fallen Angel", Erasure (2020) [12”, CD]
- Mute 626 - "YoYoGrip (Short)", A Certain Ratio feat. Jacknife Lee (2020) [Download]
- Mute 627 - "Portrait Remixed", Yann Tiersen (2020) [Download]
- Mute 628 - "Sleep Today", Maps (2020) [Download]
- Mute 629 - "The Third Chimpanzee EP", MG (2021) [12”, L12", CD, LCD]
- Mute 630 - "Tanzboden", Pole (2021) [12”]
- Mute 631 - "ACR:EPA", A Certain Ratio (2021) [12”]
- Mute 632 - "ACR:EPC", A Certain Ratio (2021) [12”]
- Mute 633 - "ACR:EPR", A Certain Ratio (2021) [12”]
- Mute 634 - "Burn Slow Remixes Pt. III", Chris Liebing (2021) [Download]
- Mute 635 - "Calm KAOSS! EP", KÁRYYN (2024)
- Mute 636 - "Ne:Ep", Erasure (2021) [C, CD, Download]
- Mute 637 - "The Sun Made for a Soft Landing" HAAi (2021) [Download]
- Mute 638 - "Fixed Is the Day We've Cast Our Lot", Louis Carnell (2021) [Download]
- Mute 639 - "Steal Away EP", Barry Adamson (2021) [12"]
- Mute 640 - "You Think I'm Horny (Planningtorock's 'Planningtobehorny' Version)", Desire Marea (2021) [Download]
- Mute 641 - "Another Day", Chris Liebing / Ralf Hildenbeutel (2022) [Download]
- Mute 642 - "Kerber Remixes", Yann Tiersen (2022) [12”, C]
- Mute 643 - "Live Y in Dub", The Pop Group (2022) [Download]
- Mute 644 - "My Pulse to Ponder (P.E.'s I Gotcha! Remix)" / "Sekwar (Shoeb Ahmad Version)", Liars (2022) [Download]
- Mute 645 - "Verve EP", JakoJako (2023) [12”, download]
- Mute 646 - "10 West (Anfisa Letyago Remix)", Chris Liebing / Ralf Hildenbeutel (2022) [Download]
- Mute 647 - "Netra Ken (Phew Remix)", Quninquis (2022) [Download]
- Mute 648 - "Adkrog (Keeley Forsyth Remix)", Quinquis (2022) [Download]
- Mute 649 -
- Mute 650 - "Biggest Mood Ever (Edit)", HAAi (2022) [Download]
- Mute 651 -
- Mute 652 - "Aer", Quinquis (2022) [Download]
- Mute 653 - "Love Is Still Alive", Laibach (2023) [12", CD]
- Mute 654 -
- Mute 655 - "Lack Of Sleep (Pye Corner Audio Remix)", Maps (2023) [Download]
- Mute 656 - "People Are Strange", Crime & the City Solution (2022) [Download]
- Mute 657 -
- Mute 658 - "Hollow Town (Frank Wiedemann Remix)", Chris Liebing / Ralf Hildenbeutel (2022) [Download]
- Mute 659 - "The Future", Laibach (2022) [Download]
- Mute 660 - "A Suitcase in Berlin (Long Version)", Mick Harvey (2023) [Download]
- Mute 661 - "Tempus Remixes", Pole (2023) [12"]
- Mute 662 - "hackedepicciotto (Remixed by David Harrow)", hackedepicciotto (2023) [Download]
- Mute 663 - "2023 EP", A Certain Ratio (2023) [12"]
- Mute 664 - "The Engine of Survival", Laibach (2023) [Download]
- Mute 665 - "Transmission (Plaid Remix)", Maps (2023) [Download]
- Mute 666 - "Evil", Grinderman (2011) [12”]
- Mute 667 - "The Baddies of Isandlwana", Desire Marea (2023) [Download]
- Mute 668 -
- Mute 669 - "Call For Jeeves", Looper (2023) [Download]
- Mute 670 - "Turning the Prism", Ben Frost (2023) [Download]
- Mute 671 - "Anthem For Those Who Know", KÁRYYN (2024) [Download]
- Mute 672 -
- Mute 673 -
- Mute 674 -
- Mute 675 -
- Mute 676 -
- Mute 677 -
- Mute 678 - "Strange Fruit", Laibach (2024) [Download]
- Mute 679 - "White Christmas", Laibach + Silence (2024) [Download]
- Mute 680 - "Christmasville UK EP", ACR (2024) [12", Download]
- Mute 681 - "I Want To Know What Love Is", Laibach (2024) [Download]
- Mute 682 -
- Mute 683 - "Stay Another Day", Maps (2024) [Download]
- Mute 684 -
- Mute 685 -
- Mute 686 -
- Mute 687 - "I’m Not Your Punchbag", Punchbag (2025) [Download]
- Mute 688 -
- Mute 689 -
- Mute 690 -
- Mute 691 -
- Mute 692 -
- Mute 693 -
- Mute 694 -
- Mute 695 -
- Mute 696 -
- Mute 697 -
- Mute 698 -
- Mute 699 -

=== Mute Czechoslovakia releases ===
- Němý 1 - "Pictures", N-Sonic (1992)
- Němý 2 - "All That I Need Is To Be Loved", Moby (1993)
- Němý 3 - "Mute Czechoslovakia / Tonal Evidence 1", Various Artists (1994)
- Němý 4 - "Rock Me Gently", Erasure (1996)
- Němý 5 - "Hit & Go Vol. 1", Various Artists (1999)
- Němý 6 - "Hit & Go Vol. 2000", Various Artists (1999)
- Němý 7 - "4B4", The Ecstasy Of Saint Theresa (2001)

=== Mute Tonträger releases ===
- Mutet 1 - "Collapsing New People", Fad Gadget (2003) [12", CD]
- Mutett 2 - "Trend", Mediengruppe Telekommander (2004) [12"]
- Mutett 3 - "Bis Zum Erbrechen Schreien", Mediengruppe Telekommander (2004) [CD]
- Mutett 4 - "Strasse Der Träume", Andreas Dorau (2005) [12"]
- Mutett 5 - "Kein Liebeslied", Andreas Dorau (2005) [12", CD]
- Mutett 6 - "40 Frauen / Im September", Andreas Dorau (2005) [12"]
- Mutett 7 -
- Mutett 8 - "Gabor Für F.", Wighnomy Bros. | Robag Wruhme (2005) [12"]
- Mutett 9 -
- Mutett 10 - "Sprengkoerper", Mediengruppe Telekommander (2005) [12"]

=== Misc releases ===
- Tiny 1 - "Never Never", The Assembly (1983)
- Tag 1 - "One Day", Vince Clarke & Paul Quinn (1985)
- Little 15 - "Little 15", Depeche Mode (1988)
- Sili 1 - "Red River Rock", Silicon Teens (1988)
- JRH 1 - "J R Hartley / Bass Degree Zero", Fortran 5 (1992)
- Nocar 1 - "Go", Moby (1994)
- PGEP 1 - "Sugarshit Sharp ", Pussy Galore (1998)
- VTK 1 - "VTK-1", Komputer (1998)
- JSBX 04 - "Techno Animal Remixes", The Jon Spencer Blues Explosion (2000)
- LUX 000 - "Live at the Ocean Club 24.11.2000", Various Artists (2000)
- VAA001 - "Freedom (Quake Mixes)", V & A (2000)
- VAA002 - "Moon & The Sky / Perchance To Dream" V & A (2001)
- Train 1 - "Wolf Lady", Goldfrapp (2002)
- Hotel 1 - "Mulholland", Moby (2005)
- Hotel 2 - "Put The Headphones On", Moby (2005)
- SEEDS 1 - "The Mercy Seat", Nick Cave & The Bad Seeds (2010)
- DVMute1 - "EP1", Diamond Version (2012)
- DVMute2 - "EP2", Diamond Version (2012)
- DVMute3 - "EP3", Diamond Version (2012)
- DVMute4 - "EP4", Diamond Version (2013)
- DVMute5 - "EP5", Diamond Version (2013)

=== Misc only digital releases ===
- XLiSTUMM278 - "Live From London (iTunes Exclusive EP)", Richard Hawley (2008)
- 5099952235559 - "Pump Up The Volume", Art Brut (2008)
- 5099922614056 - "Lady's Bridge EP", Richard Hawley (2008)
- 5099922648051 - "Freak Out EP", Liars (2008)
- 5099922646255 - "No Pussy Blues Remixes", Grinderman (2008)
- 5099996486955 - "Please Don't Touch", Polly Scattergood (2009)
- 5099996513156 - "Let Go Of The Fear", Maps (2009)
- 5099968652852 - "iTunes Live: London Festival '09", Polly Scattergood (2009)
- 5099945785054 - "Running Out", MiMó / Andy Bell (2009)
- 742 552 - "iTunes Festival: London 2010 EP", Goldfrapp (2010)
- 5099990713057 - "Proud Evolution", Liars (2010)
- 5099990744655 - "The Problem", Pull In Emergency (2010)

== Albums ==
=== Stumm 1 - 100 ===
- Stumm 1 - Die Kleinen und die Bösen, Deutsch Amerikanische Freundschaft (1980)
- Stumm 2 - Music For Parties, Silicon Teens (1980)
- Stumm 3 - Fireside Favourites, Fad Gadget (1980)
- Stumm 4 - Boyd Rice, Boyd Rice (1981) - first released in 1976 without a record label
- Stumm 5 - Speak & Spell, Depeche Mode (1981)
- Stumm 6 - Incontinent, Fad Gadget (1981)
- Stumm 7 - Upstairs at Eric's, Yazoo (1982)
- Stumm 8 - Under the Flag, Fad Gadget (1982)
- Stumm 9 - A Broken Frame, Depeche Mode (1982)
- Stumm 10 - Physical Evidence, NON (1982)
- Stumm 11 - Or So It Seems, Duet Emmo (1983)
- Stumm 12 - You and Me Both, Yazoo (1983)
- Stumm 13 - Construction Time Again, Depeche Mode (1983)
- Stumm 14 - Strategies Against Architecture 80-83 (compilation), Einstürzende Neubauten (1984)
- Stumm 15 - Gag, Fad Gadget (1984)
- Stumm 16 - Night Full Of Tension, Robert Görl (1984)
- Stumm 17 - From Her to Eternity, Nick Cave Featuring The Bad Seeds (1984)
- Stumm 18 - This Way, Bruce Gilbert (1984)
- Stumm 19 - Some Great Reward, Depeche Mode (1984)
- Stumm 20 - Easy Listening for the Hard of Hearing, Boyd Rice & Frank Tovey (1984)
- Stumm 21 - The Firstborn Is Dead, Nick Cave and the Bad Seeds (1985)
- Stumm 22 - Just South of Heaven, Crime & The City Solution (1985)
- Stumm 23 - Snakes & Ladders, Frank Tovey (1985)
- Stumm 24 - As the Veneer of Democracy Starts to Fade, Mark Stewart (1985)
- Stumm 25 - Wonderland, Erasure (1986)
- Stumm 26 - Black Celebration, Depeche Mode (1986)
- Stumm 27 - The Divine Punishment, Diamanda Galás (1986)
- Stumm 28 - Kicking Against the Pricks, Nick Cave and the Bad Seeds (1986)
- Stumm 29 - Hail, He Said (1986)
- Stumm 30 - My Translucent Hands, I Start Counting (1986)
- Stumm 31 - 1+2, Recoil (1986)
- Stumm 32 - Blood & Flame, NON (1983)
- Stumm 33 - Saint of the Pit, Diamanda Galás (1987)
- Stumm 34 - Your Funeral, My Trial, Nick Cave and the Bad Seeds (1986)
- Stumm 35 - The Circus, Erasure (1987)
- Lstumm 35 - The Two Ring Circus (live and remix album), Erasure (1987)
- Stumm 36 - Room of Lights, Crime & The City Solution (1986)
- Stumm 37 - The Fad Gadget Singles (compilation), Frank Tovey (1986)
- Stumm 38 - Oben im Eck, Holger Hiller (1986)
- Stumm 39 - The Shivering Man, Bruce Gilbert (1987)
- Stumm 40 - International (compilation), Various (1991)
- Stumm 41 - Nervous Systems (compilation), Various (1992)
- Stumm 42 - The Ideal Copy, Wire (1987)
- Stumm 43 - Mark Stewart, Mark Stewart (1987)
- Stumm 44 - Opus Dei, Laibach (1987)
- Stumm 45 - That Total Age, Nitzer Ebb (1987)
- Stumm 46 - You Must Be Certain of the Devil, Diamanda Galás (1988)
- Stumm 47 - Music for the Masses, Depeche Mode (1987)
- Stumm 48 - Get Lost (Don't Lie), These Immortal Souls (1987)
- Stumm 49 - Blue, Simon Fisher Turner (1993)
- Stumm 50 - Fused, I Start Counting (1989)
- Stumm 51 - Hydrology, Recoil (1988)
- Stumm 52 - Tender Prey, Nick Cave and the Bad Seeds (1988)
- Stumm 53 - Moss Side Story, Barry Adamson (1989)
- Stumm 54 - A Bell Is a Cup...Until It Is Struck, Wire (1988)
- Stumm 55 - The Innocents, Erasure (1988)
- Stumm 56 - Civilian, Frank Tovey (1988)
- Stumm 57 - Take Care, He Said (1989)
- Stumm 58 - Let it be, Laibach (1988)
- Stumm 59 - Shine, Crime & The City Solution (1988)
- Stumm 60 - As is, Holger Hiller (1991)
- Stumm 61 - Belief, Nitzer Ebb (1989)
- Stumm 62 - Metatron, Mark Stewart (1990)
- Stumm 63 - Soundclash, Renegade Soundwave (1990)
- Stumm 64 - Violator, Depeche Mode (1990)
- Stumm 65 - The Bride Ship, Crime & The City Solution (1989)
- Stumm 66 - IBTABA, Wire (1989)
- Stumm 67 - Counterfeit e.p., Martin L Gore (1989)
- Stumm 68 - One of Our Girls (Has Gone Missing), A.C. Marias (1989)
- Stumm 69 - Easy Listening for the Iron Youth - The Best of NON (compilation), NON (1991)
- Stumm 70 - Macbeth, Laibach (1990)
- Stumm 71 - Insiding, Bruce Gilbert (1991)
- Stumm 72 - Showtime, Nitzer Ebb (1990)
- Stumm 73 - Tyranny & The Hired Hand, Frank Tovey (1989)
- Stumm 74 - The Drill, Wire (1991)
- Stumm 75 - Wild!, Erasure (1989)
- Stumm 76 - The Good Son, Nick Cave and the Bad Seeds (1990)
- Stumm 77 - Music for Fruit, Bruce Gilbert (1991)
- Stumm 78 - Paradise Discotheque, Crime & The City Solution (1990)
- Stumm 79 - Blues, Fortran 5 (1991)
- Stumm 80 - Manscape, Wire (1990)
- Stumm 81 - Dirty Pearl, Anita Lane (1993)
- Stumm 82 - Kapital, Laibach (1992)
- Stumm 83 - Plague Mass (live album), Diamanda Galás (1991)
- Stumm 84 - Grand Union, Frank Tovey (1991)
- Stumm 85 - In Dub, Renegade Soundwave (1990)
- Stumm 86 - Hag Seed, Thirty Ought Six (1996)
- Stumm 87 - The First Letter, Wir (1991)
- Stumm 88 - Ebbhead, Nitzer Ebb (1991)
- Stumm 89 - Information, Toenut (1996)
- Stumm 90 - The Next Chapter Of Dub, Renegade Soundwave (1995)
- Stumm 91 - Madra, Miranda Sex Garden (1991)
- Stumm 92 - Henry's Dream, Nick Cave and the Bad Seeds (1992)
- Stumm 93 - Control Data, Mark Stewart (1996)
- Stumm 94 - Bloodline, Recoil (1992)
- Stumm 95 - Chorus, Erasure (1991)
- Stumm 96 - Our Likeness, Phew (1992)
- Stumm 97 - Iris, Miranda Sex Garden (1992)
- Stumm 98 - I'm Never Gonna Die Again, These Immortal Souls (1992)
- Stumm 99 - Forever, Simon Bonney (1992)
- Stumm 100 - Howyoudoin?, Renegade Soundwave (1994)

=== Stumm 101 - 200 ===
- Stumm 101 - 101 (live album), Depeche Mode (1989)
- Stumm 102 - Demixed, Holger Hiller (1992)
- Stumm 103 - The Singer, Diamanda Galás (1992)
- Stumm 104 - Bad Head Park, Fortran 5 (1993)
- Stumm 105 - Soul Murder, Barry Adamson (1992)
- Stumm 106 - Songs of Faith and Devotion, Depeche Mode (1993)
- LStumm 106 - Songs of Faith and Devotion Live (live album), Depeche Mode (1993)
- Stumm 107 - Worried Men in Second Hand Suits, Frank Tovey (1992)
- Stumm 108 - Little Present, Holger Hiller (1995)
- Stumm 109 - Holger Hiller, Holger Hiller (2000)
- Stumm 110 - The Adversary - Live (live album), Crime & The City Solution (1993)
- Stumm 111 - Possessed, Balanescu Quartet (1992)
- Stumm 112 - Suspiria, Miranda Sex Garden (1993)
- Stumm 113 - In the Shadow of the Sword, NON (1992)
- Stumm 114 - Everyman, Simon Bonney (1996)
- Stumm 115 - I Say I Say I Say, Erasure (1994)
- Stumm 116 - The A List, Wire (1993)
- Stumm 117 - Ab Ovo, Bruce Gilbert (1996)
- Stumm 118 - Big Hit, Nitzer Ebb (1995)
- Stumm 119 - Vena Cava, Diamanda Galás (1993)
- Stumm 120 - The Negro Inside Me, Barry Adamson (1993)
- Stumm 121 - NATO, Laibach (1994)
- Stumm 122 - Live Seeds (live album), Nick Cave and the Bad Seeds (1993)
- Stumm 123 - Let Love In, Nick Cave and the Bad Seeds (1994)
- Stumm 124 - Luminitza, Balanescu Quartet (1994)
- Stumm 125 - Moving Pictures, Holger Czukay (1993)
- Stumm 126 - Seasons In The Sun, Spell (1993)
- Stumm 127 - The Sporting Life, Diamanda Galás with John Paul Jones (1994)
- Stumm 128 - Receive the Flame, NON (1999)
- Stumm 129 - Fairytales of Slavery, Miranda Sex Garden (1994)
- Stumm 130 - Everything Is Wrong, Moby (1995)
- XLStumm 130 - Everything Is Wrong: Non-Stop DJ Mix Album (remix album), Moby (1996)
- Stumm 131 - Trans Slovenia Express (compilation), Various (1994)
- Stumm 132 - Now I Got Worry, Jon Spencer Blues Explosion (1996)
- Stumm 133 - Avocado Suite, Fortran 5 (1995)
- Stumm 134 - Oedipus Schmoedipus, Barry Adamson (1996)
- Stumm 135 - Lost and Foundered, Citizens Utilities (1996)
- Stumm 136 - Jesus Christ Superstars, Laibach (1996)
- Stumm 137 - Kalte Sterne (compilation), Einstürzende Neubauten (2004)
- Stumm 138 - Murder Ballads, Nick Cave and the Bad Seeds (1996)
- Stumm 139 - Might!, NON (1995)
- Stumm 140 - Rhythmicon, John Came (1995)
- Stumm 141 - 180 (compilation), Various (1995)
- Stumm 142 - The Boatman's Call, Nick Cave and the Bad Seeds (1997)
- Stumm 143 - Black Love, Afghan Whigs (1996)
- Stumm 144 - Intoxicated Man, Mick Harvey (1995)
- Stumm 145 - Erasure, Erasure (1995)
- Stumm 146 - Schrei X, Diamanda Galás (1996)
- Stumm 147 - Angels & Insects, Balanescu Quartet (1995)
- Stumm 148 - Ultra, Depeche Mode (1997)
- Stumm 149 - Live Blue Roma, SFT (1995)
- Stumm 150 - Animal Rights, Moby (1996)
- Stumm 151 - Shwarma, SFT (1996)
- Stumm 152 - RSW 1987-1995 (compilation), Renegade Soundwave (1996)
- Stumm 153 - Audiopeach, Peach (1998)
- Stumm 154 - ACME, Jon Spencer Blues Explosion (1998)
- Stumm 155 - Cowboy, Erasure (1997)
- Stumm 156 - Tabula Rasa (reissue), Einstürzende Neubauten (2004)
- Stumm 157 - Pink Elephants, Mick Harvey (1997)
- Stumm 158 - God & Beast, NON (1997)
- Stumm 159 - Unsound Methods, Recoil (1997)
- Stumm 160 - Two in the Piñata, Toenut (1997)
- Stumm 161 - As Above, So Below, Barry Adamson (1998)
- Stumm 162 - The World of Tomorrow, Komputer (1998)
- Stumm 163 - Malediction & Prayer, Diamanda Galás (1998)
- Stumm 164 - No More Shall We Part, Nick Cave and the Bad Seeds (2001)
- Stumm 165 - Market Led, Komputer (2002)
- Stumm 166 - No More Medicine, Citizens Utilities (1997)
- Stumm 167 - Catastrophic Deliquescence (Music From Fortitude 2015–2018), Ben Frost (2019)
- Stumm 168 - I Like to Score (compilation), Moby (1997)
- Stumm 169 - Oh Venus, SFT (1999)
- Stumm 170 - Avant Hard, Add N To (X) (1999)
- Stumm 171 - In Esse, Bruce Gilbert (1997)
- Stumm 172 - Play, Moby (1998)
- Stumm 173 - Liquid, Recoil (2000)
- Stumm 174 - The Murky World of Barry Adamson (compilation), Barry Adamson (1999)
- Stumm 175 - Loveboat, Erasure (2000)
- Stumm 176 - The King of Nothing Hill, Barry Adamson (2002)
- Stumm 177 - Manual, Appliance (1999)
- Stumm 178 - Re-Fused, I Start Counting (2021)
- Stumm 179 - We'll Never Stop Living This Way, Westbam (1999)
- Stumm 180 - Volume One, Echoboy (2000)
- Stumm 181 - Pretentious, The Clarke & Ware Experience (1999)
- Stumm 182 - Silence is Sexy, Einstürzende Neubauten (2000)
- Stumm 183 - Sex o'clock, Anita Lane (2001)
- Stumm 184 - ACME Plus (remix album), Jon Spencer Blues Explosion (1999)
- Stumm 185 - Nibs and Nabs, Slick Sixty (1999)
- Stumm 186 - Six Modular Pieces, Appliance (2000)
- Stumm 187 - Add Insult to Injury, Add N To (X) (2000)
- Stumm 188 - Felt Mountain, Goldfrapp (2000)
- Stumm 189 - Imperial Metric, Appliance (2001)
- Stumm 190 - Exciter, Depeche Mode (2001)
- Stumm 191 - Rough Trade Shops: 25 Years (compilation), Various (2001)
- Stumm 192 - Volume Two, Echoboy (2000)
- Stumm 193 - Ejected, I Start Counting (2021)
- Stumm 194 - Spectrum Pursuit Vehicle, Vincent Clarke & Martyn Ware (2001)
- Stumm 195 - The Snare, Looper (2003)
- Stumm 196 - Black Cherry, Goldfrapp (2004)
- Stumm 197 - Swift, SFT (2002)
- Stumm 198 - Alright on Top, Luke Slater (2002)
- Stumm 199 - Plastic Fang, Jon Spencer Blues Explosion (2002)
- Stumm 200 - Giraffe, Echoboy (2003)

=== Stumm 201 - 300 ===
- Stumm 201 - Strategies Against Architecture III (compilation), Einstürzende Neubauten (2001)
- Stumm 202 - 18, Moby (2002)
- Stumm 203 - Rough Trade Shops: Electronic 01 (compilation), Various (2002)
- Stumm 204 - Loud Like Nature, Add N To (X) (2002)
- Stumm 205 - Defixiones Will and Testament, Diamanda Galás (2003)
- Stumm 206 - La Serpenta Canta, Diamanda Galás (2003)
- Stumm 207 - Nocturama, Nick Cave and the Bad Seeds (2003)
- Stumm 208 - Pole, Pole (2003)
- Stumm 209 - Zeitlupenkino, Katharina Franck (2002)
- Stumm 210 - Are You Earthed?, Appliance (2003)
- Stumm 211 - Pre Set (compilation), Various (2003)
- Stumm 212 - Rough Trade Shops: Rock 'N' Roll 1 (compilation), Various (2001)
- Stumm 213 - Children of the Black Sun, NON (2002)
- Stumm 214 - Counterfeit^{2}, Martin L Gore (2003)
- Stumm 215 - Other People's Songs, Erasure (2003)
- Stumm 216 - Paper Monsters, Dave Gahan (2003)
- Stumm 217 - Hitparade, Station 17 (2001)
- Stumm 218 - Rough Trade Shops: Counter Culture 2002 (compilation), Various (2003)
- Stumm 219 - Terra Incognita: Ambient Works 1975 to Present (compilation), Boyd Rice/NON (2004)
- Stumm 220 - The Wire. 20 Years: 1982-2002 (compilation), Various (2002)
- Stumm 221 - Perpetuum Mobile, Einstürzende Neubauten (2004)
- Stumm 222 - Messy Century, Mountaineers (2003)
- Stumm 223 - WAT, Laibach (2003)
- Stumm 224 - Rough Trade Shops: Post Punk 1 (compilation), Various (2003)
- Stumm 225 - They Were Wrong, So We Drowned, Liars (2004)
- Stumm 226 - Rough Trade Shops: Country 1 (compilation), Various (2003)
- Stumm 227 - Phoenix, The Warlocks (2003)
- Stumm 228 - Synthetik, Komputer (2007)
- Stumm 229 - Sónar 2003 (compilation), Various (2003)
- Stumm 230 - This Is for Real, Pink Grease (2004)
- Stumm 231 - ACR:PERC (cassette, compilation, limited to 200 copies), A Certain Ratio (2016)
- Stumm 232 - Thunder + Lightning, Modey Lemon (2004)
- Stumm 233 - Abattoir Blues/The Lyre of Orpheus, Nick Cave and the Bad Seeds (2004)
- Stumm 234 - Rough Trade Shops: Counter Culture 03 (compilation), Various (2004)
- Stumm 235 - Union Street, Erasure (2006)
- Stumm 236 - Damage, Blues Explosion (2004)
- Stumm 237 - Surgery, The Warlocks (2003)
- Stumm 238 - The Curious City, Modey Lemon (2005)
- Stumm 239 - Rough Trade Shops: Indiepop 1 (compilation), Various (2004)
- Stumm 240 - Hotel, Moby (2005)
- Stumm 241 - Drainland, Michael Gira (2017)
- Stumm 242 - Maria T, Balanescu Quartet (2005)
- Stumm 243 - The Commercial Album 25th Anniversary Special Edition, The Residents (2004)
- Stumm 244 - Play - The B-sides (compilation), Moby (2004)
- Stumm 245 - Nightbird, Erasure (2005)
- Stumm 246 - Drum's Not Dead, Liars (2006)
- Stumm 247 - Animal Lover, The Residents (2005)
- Stumm 248 - Rough Trade Shops: Counter Culture 2004 (compilation), Various (2004)
- Stumm 249 - One Man's Treasure, Mick Harvey (2005)
- Stumm 250 - Supernature, Goldfrapp (2005)
- Stumm 251 - Coles Corner, Richard Hawley (2005)
- Stumm 252 -
- Stumm 253 - The Third Reich 'n' Roll (re-release), The Residents (2005)
- Stumm 254 - Lana Lara Lata, Simon Fisher Turner (2005)
- Stumm 255 - The Proposition (soundtrack), Nick Cave & Warren Ellis (2006)
- Stumm 256 - Trans Slovenia Express Vol. 2 (compilation), Various (2005)
- Stumm 257 - Two of Diamonds, Mick Harvey (2005)
- Stumm 258 - Mark of the Mole + Intermission (re-release), The Residents (2005)
- Stumm 259 - The Tunes of Two Cities + The Big Bubble (re-release), The Residents (2005)
- Stumm 260 - Playing the Angel, Depeche Mode (2005)
- Stumm 261 - Mute Audio Documents: Volume 1: 1978-1981 (compilation), Various (2007)
- Stumm 262 - Mute Audio Documents: Volume 2: 1982 (compilation), Various (2007)
- Stumm 263 - Mute Audio Documents: Volume 3: 1983 (compilation), Various (2007)
- Stumm 264 - Mute Audio Documents: Volume 4: 1984 (compilation), Various (2007)
- Stumm 265 -
- Stumm 266 -
- Stumm 267 -
- Stumm 268 - EXTRA, These Immortal Souls (2024)
- Stumm 269 -
- Stumm 270 -
- Stumm 271 - Mechanical Heart, Pink Grease (2006) unreleased album
- Stumm 272 - Grinderman, Grinderman (2007)
- Stumm 273 - Rough Trade Shops - Singer Songwriter 1 (compilation), Various (2006)
- Stumm 274 - Guilty! Guilty! Guilty! - Diamanda Galás (2008)
- Stumm 275 - Last Night, Moby (2008)
- LStumm 275 - Last Night Remixed (remix album), Moby (2008)
- Stumm 276 - Volk - Laibach (2006)
- Stumm 277 - Dig, Lazarus, Dig!!! - Nick Cave And The Bad Seeds (2008)
- Stumm 278 - Lady's Bridge, Richard Hawley (2007)
- Stumm 279 - subHuman, Recoil (2007)
- Stumm 280 - Seventh Tree, Goldfrapp (2008)
- Stumm 281 - We Can Create, Maps (2007)
- Stumm 282 - Tweedles, The Residents (2006)
- Stumm 283 - Freak Show (re-release), The Residents (2006)
- Stumm 284 - Sueña La Alhambra, Morente (2006)
- Stumm 285 - Light at the End of the World, Erasure (2007)
- Stumm 286 - Mujeres, Estrella Morente (2006)
- Stumm 287 - Liars, Liars (2007)
- Stumm 288 - Hourglass, Dave Gahan (2007)
- Stumm 289 - Bang Bang Boom Cake, Tiny Masters Of Today (2007)
- Stumm 290 - Polly Scattergood, Polly Scattergood (2009)
- Stumm 291 - The Voice of Midnight, The Residents (2007)
- Stumm 292 -
- Stumm 293 - Welcome To Goon Island, XX Teens (2008)
- Stumm 294 - The Assassination of Jesse James by the Coward Robert Ford (soundtrack), Nick Cave & Warren Ellis (2007)
- Stumm 295 - Duck Stab (re-release), The Residents (2008)
- Stumm 296 - Eskimo (re-release), The Residents (2008)
- Stumm 297 - Laibachkunstderfuge, Laibach (2008)
- Stumm 298 - Turning the Mind, Maps (2009)
- Stumm 299 - Grinderman 2, Grinderman (2010)
- XStumm 299 - Grinderman 2 RMX (remix album), Grinderman (2012)
- Stumm 300 - Sounds of the Universe, Depeche Mode (2009)

=== Stumm 301 - 400 ===
- Stumm 301 - The Bunny Boy, The Residents (2008)
- Stumm 302 - Skeletons, Tiny Masters Of Today (2009)
- Stumm 303 - Autobahn (remastered), Kraftwerk (2009)
- Stumm 304 - Radio-Activity (remastered), Kraftwerk (2009)
- Stumm 305 - Trans-Europe Express (remastered), Kraftwerk (2009)
- Stumm 306 - The Man-Machine (remastered), Kraftwerk (2009)
- Stumm 307 - Computer World (remastered), Kraftwerk (2009)
- Stumm 308 - Techno Pop (remastered), Kraftwerk (2009)
- Stumm 309 - The Mix (remastered), Kraftwerk (2009)
- Stumm 310 - Tour de France (remastered), Kraftwerk (2009)
- Stumm 311 - Exploding Head, A Place To Bury Strangers (2009)
- Stumm 312 - Truelove's Gutter, Richard Hawley (2009)
- Stumm 313 - White Lunar, Nick Cave & Warren Ellis (2009)
- Stumm 314 - It's Frightening, White Rabbits (2010)
- Stumm 315 - Sisterworld, Liars (2010)
- Stumm 316 - Non Stop, Andy Bell (2010)
- Stumm 317 -
- Stumm 318 - La ballade of Lady & Bird, Lady & Bird (2010)
- Stumm 319 - The Road (Original Film Score), Nick Cave & Warren Ellis (2009)
- Stumm 320 - Head First, Goldfrapp (2010)
- Stumm 321 - Odd Blood, Yeaseyer (2010)
- Stumm 322 - Reconnected Live (live album), Yazoo (2010)
- Stumm 323 - Pull in Emergency, Pull in Emergency (2010)
- Stumm 324 - Dust Lane, Yann Tiersen (2010)
- Stumm 325 - Strategies Against Architecture IV (compilation), Einsturzende Neubauten (2010)
- Stumm 326 - Last Of The Country Gentlemen, Josh T. Pearson (2011)
- Stumm 327 - Again Into Eyes, S.C.U.M. (2011)
- Stumm 328 - Arrows, Polly Scattergood (2013)
- Stumm 329 - Sketches from the Book Of The Dead, Mick Harvey (2011)
- Stumm 330 - Soundescapes, Simon Fisher Turner / Espen J. Jorgensen (2011)
- Stumm 331 - Intoxicated Man / Pink Elephants (re-release), Mick Harvey (2014)
- Stumm 332 - Lights Out, Big Deal (2011)
- Stumm 333 - clarapandy, paul a. taylor (conceptual and tbc)
- Stumm 334 - The Devil's Walk, Apparat (2011)
- Stumm 335 - Tomorrow's World, Erasure (2011)
- Stumm 336 - Yours Truly, Cellophane Nose, Beth Jeans Houghton & The Hooves of Destiny (2011)
- Stumm 337 - Skyline, Yann Tiersen (2011)
- Stumm 338 - Back To Mono, NON / Boyd Rice (2012)
- Stumm 339 - American Twilight, Crime and the City Solution (2013)
- Stumm 340 - Transverse, Carter Tutti Void (2012)
- Stumm 341 - Milk Famous, White Rabbits (2012)
- Stumm 342 - I Predict a Graceful Expulsion, Cold Specks (2012)
- Stumm 343 - WIXIW, Liars (2012)
- Stumm 344 - Iron Sky (The Original Film Soundtrack), Laibach (2012)
- Stumm 345 - Roman Roads IV-XI, Land Observations (2012)
- Stumm 346 - Fragrant World, Yeasayer (2012)
- Stumm 347 - Sheet One (remastered), Plastikman (2012)
- Stumm 348 - Recycled Plastik (remastered), Plastikman (2012)
- Stumm 349 - Musik (remastered), Plastikman (2012)
- Stumm 350 - Artifakts (bc) (remastered), Plastikman (2012)
- Stumm 351 - House of Illustrious, The Clarke & Ware Experiment (2012)
- Stumm 352 - Krieg und Frieden (Music for Theatre), Apparat (2013)
- Stumm 353 - Four (Acts of Love), Mick Harvey (2013)
- Stumm 354 - Vicissitude, Maps (2013)
- Stumm 355 - June Gloom, Big Deal (2013)
- Stumm 356 - Tales of Us, Goldfrapp (2013)
- Stumm 357 - The Epic of Everest, Simon Fisher Turner (2013)
- Stumm 358 - Spectre, Laibach (2014)
- Stumm 359 - Mess, Liars (2014)
- Stumm 360 - Music From Republik Der Wölfe, The Ministry Of Wolves (2014)
- LStumm 360 - Happily Ever After, The Ministry Of Wolves (2014)
- Stumm 361 - Break Line - The Musical, Anand Wilder & Maxwell Kardon (2014)
- Stumm 362 - The Seer (re-release), Swans (2014)
- Stumm 363 - My Father Will Guide Me up a Rope to the Sky (re-release), Swans (2014)
- Stumm 364 - To Be Kind, Swans (2014)
- Stumm 365 - Snow Globe, Erasure (2013)
- Stumm 366 -
- Stumm 367 - ∞ (Infinity), Yann Tiersen (2014)
- Stumm 368 - A U R O R A, Ben Frost (2014)
- Stumm 369 - The Grand Tour, Land Observations (2014)
- Stumm 370 - EX (Performed live at the Guggenheim, NYC), Plastikman (2014)
- Stumm 371 - Neuroplasticity, Cold Specks (2014)
- Stumm 372 - Realigned, Maps (2014) [digital-only release]
- Stumm 373 - Taiga, Zola Jesus (2014)
- Stumm 374 - Xen, Arca (2014)
- Stumm 375 - The Violet Flame, Erasure (2014)
- Stumm 376 - Filth (re-release), Swans (2014)
- Stumm 377 - White Light From The Mouth Of Infinity / Love of Life (re-release), Swans (2015)
- Stumm 378 - Up a Tree (re-release), Looper (2015)
- Stumm 379 - The Geometrid (re-release), Looper (2015)
- Stumm 380 - Offgrid:Offline, Looper (2015)
- Stumm 381 - MG, MG (2015)
- Stumm 382 - Welcome Back To Milk, Du Blonde (2015)
- Stumm 383 - On Dead Waves, On Dead Waves (2016)
- Stumm 384 - Love of Life (vinyl re-release), Swans (2016)
- Stumm 385 - 1/1 (Original Soundtrack), Liars (2018)
- Stumm 386 - Mutant, Arca (2015)
- Stumm 387 - Amen & Goodbye, Yeasayer (2016)
- Stumm 388 - Spiritual Songs for Lovers to Sing, LUH (2016)
- Stumm 389 - The Glowing Man, Swans (2016)
- Stumm 390 - Music Complete, New Order (2015)
- LStumm 390 - Complete Music, New Order (2016)
- Stumm 391 - Cop / Young God (re-release), Swans (2015)
- Stumm 392 - Greed / Time Is Money (Bastard) (re-release), Swans (2015)
- Stumm 393 - Holy Money / A Screw (re-release), Swans (2015)
- Stumm 394 - Public Castration Is a Good Idea (Live) (re-release), Swans (2015)
- Stumm 395 - Delirium Tremens, Mick Harvey (2016)
- Stumm 396 - Intoxicated Women, Mick Harvey (2017)
- Stumm 397 - Eusa, Yann Tiersen (2016)
- S7Stumm 397 - The Lost Notebook - Eusa, Yann Tiersen (2018)
- HStumm 397 - Hent, Yann Tiersen (2018)
- Stumm 398 - The Texas-Jerusalem Crossroads (re-release), Lift To Experience (2017)
- Stumm 399 - Silver Eye, Goldfrapp (2017)
- Stumm 400 - The Centre Cannot Hold, Ben Frost (2017)

=== Stumm 401 - 500 ===
- Stumm 401 - Also Sprach Zarathustra, Laibach (2017)
- Stumm 402 - The Great Annihilator (re-release), Swans (2017)
- Stumm 403 - Electrim Trim, Lee Ranaldo (2017)
- Stumm 404 - Detroit House Guests, ADULT. (2017)
- Stumm 405 - World Be Gone, Erasure (2017)
- Stumm 406 - The Graveyard and the Ballroom (re-release), A Certain Ratio (2017)
- Stumm 407 - To Each... (re-release), A Certain Ratio (2017)
- Stumm 408 - Sextet (re-release), A Certain Ratio (2016)
- Stumm 409 - I'd Like to See You Again (re-release), A Certain Ratio (2016)
- Stumm 410 - Force (re-release), A Certain Ratio (2017)
- Stumm 411 - Up in Downsville (re-release), A Certain Ratio (2016)
- Stumm 412 - Change the Station (re-release), A Certain Ratio (2016)
- Stumm 413 - Mind Made Up (re-release), A Certain Ratio (2016)
- Stumm 414 - TFCF, Liars (2017); TWTWF, Liars (2018)
- Stumm 415 - Chemistry Lessons Volume 1, Chris Carter (2018)
- Stumm 416 - Blast of Silence, NON (2020)
- Stumm 417 - Scented Pictures, Nonpareils (2018)
- Stumm 418 - Burn Slow, Chris Liebing (2018)
- Stumm 419 - The Straight Hits!, Josh T. Pearson (2018)
- Stumm 420 - NOMC15, New Order (2017)
- Stumm 421 - Soundtracks For The Blind (re-release), Swans (2018)
- Stumm 422 - Die Tür Ist Zu (re-release), Swans (2018)
- Stumm 423 - ShadowParty, ShadowParty (2018)
- Stumm 424 - Minus - Daniel Blumberg (2018)
- Stumm 425 - World Beyond, Erasure (2018)
- Stumm 426 - Quiet & Small, Looper (2018)
- Stumm 427 - Love Hates What You Become, Lost Under Heaven (2019)
- Stumm 428 - Electric Trim Live At Rough Trade East, Lee Ranaldo (2018)
- Stumm 429 - The Fall and Rise of Edgar Bourchier and the Horrors of War, Mick Harvey and Christopher Richard Barker (2018)
- Stumm 430 - The Sound of Music, Laibach (2018)
- Stumm 431 - Past, Present, Future, Simon Bonney (2019)
- Stumm 432 - All, Yann Tiersen (2019)
- Stumm 433 - STUMM433, Various Artists (2019)
- Stumm 434 - Liv, Daniel Blumberg & Hebronix (2019)
- Stumm 435 - World Be Live, Erasure (2018)
- Stumm 436 - LP5, Apparat (2019)
- Stumm 437 - The Quanta Series, KÁRYYN (2019)
- Stumm 438 - Colours. Reflect. Time. Loss., Maps (2019); Colours. Remixed. Time. Loss., Maps (2020) (cassette only)
- Stumm 439 - A Quiet Corner Of Time, Simon Fisher Turner and Edmund de Waal (2020)
- Stumm 440 - Vorwärts (compilation), Various (2011)
- Stumm 441 - Ssss, VCMG (2012)
- Stumm 442 - The Girl with the Dragon Tattoo (soundtrack), Trent Reznor / Atticus Ross (2011)
- Stumm 443 - Volume Massimo, Alessandro Cortini (2019)
- Stumm 444 - GUO4, GUO (2019)
- Stumm 445 - Names of North End Women, Lee Ranaldo & Raül Refree (2020)
- Stumm 446 - leaving meaning., Swans (2019)
- Stumm 447 -
- Stumm 448 - Waves Of Anzac / The Journey, Mick Harvey (2020)
- Stumm 449 - Portrait, Yann Tiersen (2019)
- Stumm 450 - Σ(No,12k, Lg,17Mif) New Order + Liam Gillick: So it goes.., New Order (2019)
- Stumm 451 - The Upward Spiral, Nicolas Bougaïeff (2020)
- Stumm 452 - On&On, Daniel Blumberg (2020)
- Stumm 453 - Children Of God (re-release), Swans (2020)
- Stumm 454 - ACR Loco, A Certain Ratio (2020)
- RStumm 454 - Loco Remezclada, A Certain Ratio (2021)
- MStumm 454 - Loco Live at Hope Mill Studios, A Certain Ratio (2022)
- Stumm 455 - The Neon, Erasure (2020)
- Stumm 456 - A Call To Arms, Visionist (2021)
- Stumm 457 - Fading, Pole (2020)
- Stumm 458 - Soundtracks: Capri-Revolution, Apparat (2021)
- Stumm 459 - Soundtracks: Stay Still, Apparat (2021)
- Stumm 460 - Soundtracks: Dämonen, Apparat (2021)
- Stumm 461 - Soundtracks: Equals Sessions, Apparat (2021)
- Stumm 462 - Feel Good Now (2020 Remaster), Swans (2020)
- Stumm 463 - Scuro Chiaro, Alessandro Cortini (2021)
- Stumm 464 - The Apple Drop, Liars (2021)
- Stumm 465 - Kerber, Yann Tiersen (2021)
- Stumm 466 - Feel Good Now (re-release), Swans (2023)
- Stumm 467 - Desire, Desire Marea (2021)
- Stumm 468 - The World to Come, Daniel Blumberg (2022)
- Stumm 469 - Another Day, Chris Liebing (2021)
- Stumm 470 - The Silver Threshold, hackedepicciotto (2021)
- Stumm 471 - In Virus Times, Lee Ranaldo (2021)
- Stumm 472 - Wir sind das Volk (Ein Musical aus Deutschland), Laibach (2022)
- Stumm 473 - Begin Within, Nicolas Bougaïeff (2022)
- Stumm 474 - SEIM, QUINQUIS (2022)
- Stumm 475 - Baby, We're Ascending, HAAi (2022)
- Stumm 476 - Tempus, Pole (2022)
- Stumm 477 - On the Romance of Being, Desire Marea (2023)
- Stumm 478 - 11 5 18 2 5 18, Yann Tiersen (2022)
- Stumm 479 -
- Stumm 480 - 1982, A Certain Ratio (2023)
- Stumm 481 - Shifting Signals, Terence Fixmer (2022)
- Stumm 482 - Iron Sky: The Coming Race, Laibach (2023)
- Stumm 483 - Follow the Cyborg, Miss Grit (2023)
- RStumm 483 - Follow The Cyborg (Remixes), Miss Grit (2023)
- Stumm 484 - EP ACR, A Certain Ratio (2022)
- Stumm 485 - Day-Glo (Based on a True Story) - Erasure (2022)
- Stumm 486 - the killer, Crime & the City Solution (2023)
- Stumm 487 - Last Man Dancing, Jake Shears (2023)
- RStumm 487 - Last Man Dancing (Remixes), Jake Shears (2023)
- Stumm 488 - Counter Melodies, Maps (2023)
- Stumm 489 - The Beggar, Swans (2023)
- Stumm 490 -
- Stumm 491 -
- Stumm 492 - It All Comes Down to This, A Certain Ratio (2024)
- Stumm 493 - Phantasmagoria in Blue, Mick Harvey & Amanda Acevedo (2023)
- Stumm 494 - Five Ways To Say Goodbye, Mick Harvey (2024)
- Stumm 495 - Light For The Midnight, Cold Specks (2025)
- Stumm 496 - New Decade, Phew (2021)
- Stumm 497 - Another Night, Chris Liebing (2022)
- Stumm 498 - GUT, Daniel Blumberg (2023)
- Stumm 499 - Keepsakes, hackdepicciotto (2023)
- Stumm 500 - Songs of Silence, Vince Clarke (2023)

=== Stumm 501 - 600 ===
- Stumm 501 -
- Stumm 502 - Kerber Complete, Yann Tiersen (2023)
- Stumm 503 - Scope Neglect, Ben Frost (2024)
- Stumm 504 - Instability of the Signal, Simon Fisher Turner (2024)
- Stumm 505 - The Neon Live, Erasure (2024)
- Stumm 506 - Alamut, Laibach (2025)
- Stumm 507 - 111, Louis Carnell (2024)
- Stumm 508 - The Paradox in Me, Terence Fixmer (2024)
- Stumm 509 - Rhetoric & Terror, Nonpareils (2024)
- Stumm 510 - Heat Ray: The Archimedes Project, Will Gregory Moog Ensemble (2024)
- Stumm 511 - Counter Continuo, Maps (2024)
- Stumm 512 - The Best of hackedepicciotto (Live in Napoli), hackedepicciotto (2024)
- Stumm 513 - Tết 41, JakoJako (2025)
- Stumm 514 - Rathlin From A Distance / The Liquid Hour, Yann Tiersen (2025)
- Stumm 515 - Eor, Quinquis (2025)
- Stumm 516 - Birthing, Swans (2025)
- Stumm 517 - The Fateful Symmetry, Mark Stewart (2025)
- Stumm 518 -
- Stumm 519 -
- Stumm 520 -
- Stumm 521 -
- Stumm 522 -
- Stumm 523 -
- Stumm 524 -
- Stumm 525 -
- Stumm 526 -
- Stumm 527 -
- Stumm 528 -
- Stumm 529 -
- Stumm 530 -
- Stumm 531 -
- Stumm 532 -
- Stumm 533 -
- Stumm 534 -
- Stumm 535 -
- Stumm 536 -
- Stumm 537 -
- Stumm 538 -
- Stumm 539 -
- Stumm 540 -
- Stumm 541 -
- Stumm 542 -
- Stumm 543 -
- Stumm 544 - Opus Dei Revisited, Laibach (2025)

=== Stumm 801 - 900 ===
- Stumm 888 - Nati Infiniti, Alessandro Cortini (2024)

=== Mute Tonträger releases ===
- Stummt1 - Herr Lehmann (Der Original Soundtrack Aus Dem Film) (compilation), Various (2003)
- Stummtt2 - Die Ganze Kraft Einer Kultur, Mediengruppe Telekommander (2004)
- Stummtt3 - Die Fetten Jahre Sind Vorbei (Der Soundtrack Zum Film) (compilation), Various (2004)
- Stummtt4 - The Edukators (compilation), Various (2004)
- Stummtt5 - Ich Bin Der Eine Von Uns Beiden, Andreas Dorau (2005)
- Stummtt6 -
- Stummtt7 -
- Stummtt8 - Remikks Potpourri, Wighnomy Bros. | Robag Wruhme (2005)

=== Misc releases ===
==== 1980-1989 ====
- Galas 1 - Masque Of The Red Death (anthology), Diamanda Galás (1988)
- ISO 1 - The Litanies of Satan (re-release), Diamanda Galás (1989)

==== 1990-1999 ====
- Eucrid 1 - And The Ass Saw The Angel (audiobook), Nick Cave, Mick Harvey And Ed Clayton-Jones (1998)
- PGCD 1 - Right Now! (re-release), Pussy Galore (1998)
- PGCD 2 - Dial 'M' for Motherfucker (re-release), Pussy Galore (1998)
- Irreg 6/7 - 14 Irregular Files - A Mute Accumulation (compilation), Various (1999)

==== 2000-2009 ====
- JSBX 01 - Extra Width / Mo' Width (re-release), Blues Explosion (2000)
- JSBX 02 - Orange (re-release), The Jon Spencer Blues Explosion (2000)
- JSBX 03 - Experimental Remixes (re-release), The Jon Spencer Blues Explosion (2000)
- Idiot 2 - Baby Monkey, Voodoo Child (2004)
- 0094639631223 - It's A Bit Complicated, Art Brut (2007)
- AudioBox1 - Mute Audio Documents 1978-1984 (boxset), Various (2007)

==== 2010-2019 ====
- EBBBOX 1 - Catalogue (albums boxset), Nitzer Ebb (2010)
- EBBBOX 2 - Compilation (compilations boxset), Nitzer Ebb (2010)
- iEBBBOX 3 - In Order (singles with b-sides & remixes anthology), Nitzer Ebb (2010) [digital-only release]
- P3011672 - The Singles (compilation), Goldfrapp (2012)
- P4636981 - Standing at the Sky's Edge, Richard Hawley (2012)
- DVMute12345 - EP 1-5, Diamond Version (2013)
- StummDV1 - CI, Diamond Version (2014)
- 538013752 - Lament, Einstürzende Neubauten (2014)
- LooperBX01 - These Things (boxset), Looper (2015)
- ACRCD/LP1 - acr:mcr (re-release), A Certain Ratio (2018)
- ACRCD/LP2 - Good Together (re-release), A Certain Ratio (2018)
- MSATM1 - Learning To Cope With Cowardice / The Lost Tapes (re-release), Mark Stewart And The Maffia (2019)
- ACRBOX1 - acr:box, A Certain Ratio (2019)
- TPGY1 - Y, The Pop Group (2019)

==== 2020-2029 ====
- RSH1 - Teenage Snuff Film, Rowland S. Howard (2020)
- RSH2 - Pop Crimes, Rowland S. Howard (2020)
- POLE123 - 123, Pole (2020)
- APPARATBX1 - Soundtracks, Apparat (2021)
- TELEXBOX1CD - Telex (albums boxset), Telex (2023)

== Best of / Collections ==
=== Mutel1 - 10 ===
- Mutel1 - The Singles (81-85), Depeche Mode (1985)
- Mutel2 - Pop! - the First 20 Hits, Erasure (1992)
- Mootel3 - The Singles, Inspiral Carpets (1995)
- Mutel4 - The Best Of, Nick Cave & the Bad Seeds (1998)
- Mutel5 - The Singles (86-98), Depeche Mode (1998)
- Mutel6 - Only Yazoo - The Best Of, Yazoo (1999)
- Mutel7 - The Best Of Fad Gadget, Fad Gadget (2001)
- Mutel8 - Remixes 81 - 04, Depeche Mode (2004)
- Mutel9 - Body of Work, Nitzer Ebb (2006)
- Mutel10 - Hits!, Erasure (2003)

=== Mutel11 - 20 ===
- Mutel11 - B-Sides And Rarities, Nick Cave & The Bad Seeds (2005) [3×CD]
- Mutel12 - Anthems, Laibach (2004)
- Mutel13 - Fad Gadget By Frank Tovey, Fad Gadget (2006) [2×CD+2xDVD]
- Mutel14 - Go - The Very Best of Moby, Moby (2006)
- XMutel14 - Go – The Very Best of Moby: Remixed, Moby (2006) [CD]
- Mutel15 - The Best Of, Volume 1, Depeche Mode (2006) [3×LP, CD, CD+DVD]
- Mutel16 - Total Pop! - the First 40 Hits, Erasure (2009) [4×CD]
- XMutel16 - Pop2! - the Second 20 Hits, Erasure (2009) [2×CD]
- Mutel17 - Selected, Recoil (2010)
- Mutel18 - Remixes 2: 81-11, Depeche Mode (2011)
- Mutel19 - This Is The Balanescu Quartet, Balanescu Quartet (2011)
- Mutel20 - Konnecting..., I Start Counting/Fortran 5/Komputer (2011) [CD]
- iXMutel20 - Konnecting... (Deluxe - B Sides and Rarities) I Start Counting/Fortran 5/Komputer (2011) [digital-only release]

=== Mutel21 - 30 ===
- Mutel21 - A History of Crime. Berlin 1987-1991 - An Introduction to..., Crime & The City Solution (2012) [CD]
- Mutel22 -
- Mutel23 - Reproduction Prohibited - An Introduction to..., Laibach (2012) [CD]
- Mutel24 -
- Mutel25 -
- Mutel26 - Always: The Very Best of Erasure, Erasure (2015) [CD, LCD]
- Mutel27 -
- Mutel28 - acr:set, A Certain Ratio (2018) [2×LP, CD]
- Mutel29 - Memento Mori (Anthology 1978-2018), Barry Adamson (2018) [2×LP (Gold), CD]
- Mutel30 - This is Telex, Telex (2021) [2×LP, CD, Cassette]

== Depeche Mode Bong releases ==
=== Bong 1-10: 1982-1986 ===
- Bong 1 - "Leave in Silence" (August 1982) [7-inch, 12-inch, CD]
- Bong 2 - "Get the Balance Right" (January 1983) [7-inch, 12-inch, L12", CD]
- Bong 3 - "Everything Counts" (July 1983) [7-inch, 12-inch, L12", CD]
- Bong 4 - "Love In Itself" (September 1983) [7-inch, 12-inch, L12", CD]
- Bong 5 - "People Are People" (March 1984) [7-inch, 12-inch, L12", CD]
- Bong 6 - "Master and Servant" (August 1984) [7-inch, 12-inch, L12", CD]
- Bong 7 - "Blasphemous Rumours / Somebody" (October 1984) [7-inch, 7-inch EP, 12-inch, CD]
- Bong 8 - "Shake the Disease" (April 1985) [7-inch, 12-inch, L12", CD]
- Bong 9 - "It's Called a Heart" (September 1985) [7-inch, 12-inch, D12", CD]
- Bong 10 - "Stripped" (February 1986) [7-inch, 12-inch, CD]

=== Bong 11-20: 1986-1990 ===
- Bong 11 - "A Question of Lust" (April 1986) [7-inch, 12-inch, C, CD]
- Bong 12 - "A Question of Time" (August 1986) [7-inch, 12-inch, L12", CD]
- Bong 13 - "Strangelove" (April 1987) [7-inch, 12-inch, L12" CD]
- Bong 14 - "Never Let Me Down Again" (August 1987) [7-inch, 12-inch, L12", C, CD]
- Bong 15 - "Behind the Wheel" (December 1987) [7-inch, 12-inch, L12", C, CD]
- Bong 16 - "Everything Counts" (July 1989) [7-inch, 10-inch, 12-inch, L12", CD, LCD]
- Bong 17 - "Personal Jesus" (August 1989) [7-inch, Gatefold 7-inch, 12-inch, L12", C, CD, LCD]
- Bong 18 - "Enjoy the Silence" (February 1990) [7-inch, 12-inch, L12", XL12", C, CD, LCD, XLCD]
- Bong 19 - "Policy of Truth" (May 1990) [7-inch, 12-inch, L12", C, CD, LCD]
- Bong 20 - "World in My Eyes" (September 1990) [7-inch, 12-inch, L12", C, CD, LCD]

=== Bong 21-30: 1993-2001 ===
- Bong 21 - "I Feel You" (February 1993) [7-inch, 12-inch, L12", C, CD, LCD]
- Bong 22 - "Walking In My Shoes" (April 1993) [12-inch, L12", C, CD, LCD]
- Bong 23 - "Condemnation" (September 1993) [12-inch, L12", C, CD, LCD]
- Bong 24 - "In Your Room" (January 1994) [12-inch, L12", C, CD, LCD, XLCD]
- Bong 25 - "Barrel of a Gun" (February 1997) [12-inch, L12", CD, LCD]
- Bong 26 - "It's No Good" (March 1997) [12-inch, C, CD, LCD]
- Bong 27 - "Home" (June 1997) [12-inch, C, CD, LCD]
- Bong 28 - "Useless" (October 1997) [12-inch, CD, LCD]
- Bong 29 - "Only When I Lose Myself" (September 1998) [12-inch, L12", CD, LCD, XLCD]
- Bong 30 - "Dream On" (April 2001) [12-inch, CD, LCD]

=== Bong 31-40: 2001-2009 ===
- Bong 31 - "I Feel Loved" (July 2001) [12-inch, L12", CD, LCD]
- Bong 32 - "Freelove" (November 2001) [12-inch, CD, LCD, DVD]
- Bong 33 - "Goodnight Lovers" (February 2002) [12-inch, CD]
- Bong 34 - "Enjoy the Silence 04" (October 2004) [12-inch, L12", XL12", CD, LCD, XLCD, download]
- Bong 35 - "Precious" (October 2005) [7-inch, 12-inch, L12", CD, LCD, DVD, download]
- Bong 36 - "A Pain That I'm Used To" (December 2005) [7-inch, 12-inch, L12", CD, LCD, DVD, download]
- Bong 37 - "Suffer Well" (March 2006) [7-inch, 12-inch, L12", XL12", CD, LCD, DVD, download]
- Bong 38 - "John the Revelator / Lilian" (June 2006) [7-inch, 12-inch, L12", CD, LCD, DVD, download]
- Bong 39 - "Martyr" (October 2006) [7-inch, 12-inch, L12", CD, LCD, DVD, download]
- Bong 40 - "Wrong" (April 2009) [7-inch, 12-inch, CD, LCD, download]

=== Bong 41-43: 2009-2011 ===
- Bong 41 - "Peace" (June 2009) [7-inch, CD, LCD, download]
- Bong 42 - "Fragile Tension / Hole to Feed" (December 2009) [12-inch, CD, download]
- Bong 43 - "Personal Jesus 2011" (April 2011) [12-inch, CD, download]

== Yazoo Releases ==
- YAZ 1 - "Don't Go" (1982) [7-inch, 12-inch, CD]
- YAZ 2 - "The Other Side Of Love" (1982) [7-inch, 12-inch, CD]
- YAZ 3 - "Nobody's Diary" (1983) [7-inch, 12-inch, L12", CD]
- YAZ 4 - "Situation (Remix)" (1990) [7-inch, 12-inch, C, CD, LCD]
- YAZ 5 - "Only You (1999 Mix)" (1999) [12-inch, CD, LCD]
- YAZ 6 - "Situation (Remixes)" (1999) [CD]
- YAZ 7 - "Nobody's Diary EP" (2008) [12-inch, download]
- YAZ 8 - "Reconnected EP" (2008) [12-inch, download]
- YAZ 9 - "Situation (François K Remixes)" (2018) [Limited 12-inch]

== Inspiral Carpets Releases ==
=== Dung 1 - 10 ===
- Dung 1
- Dung 2 - "Trainsurfing EP" (1989)
- Dung 3 - "Joe" (1989)
- Dung 4 - Dung 4 (1989)
- Dung 5 - "Find Out Why" (1989)
- Dung 6 - "Move" (1989)
- Dung 7 - "This Is How It Feels" (1990)
- Dung 8 - Life (1990)
- Dung 9 - "Cool as **** EP" (1990)
- Dung 10 - "She Comes In The Fall" (1990)

=== Dung 11 - 20 ===
- Dung 11 - "Island Head EP" (1990)
- Dung 12 - "21.7.90" (1990) [Video]
- Dung 13 - "Caravan" (1991)
- Dung 14 - The Beast Inside (1991)
- Dung 15 - "Please Be Cruel" (1991)
- Dung 16 - "Dragging Me Down" (1992)
- Dung 17 - "Two Worlds Collide" (1992)
- Dung 18 - "Generations" (1992)
- Dung 19 - Revenge of the Goldfish (1992)
- Dung 20 - "Bitches Brew" (1992)

=== Dung 21 - 30 ===
- Dung 21 - "Smoking Her Clothes" (1992) [Promo]
- Dung 22 - "How It Should Be" (1993)
- Dung 23 - "Saturn 5" (1994)
- Dung 24 - "I Want You" (1994)
- Dung 25 - Devil Hopping (1994)
- Dung 26 - "Uniform" (1994)
- Dung 27 - "Joe" (1995)
- Dung 28
- Dung 29
- Dung 30 - Cool As (2003)

=== Dung 31 - 33 ===
- Dung 31 - "Come Back Tomorrow" (2003)
- Dung 32 - Greatest Hits (2003)
- Dung 33 - Live at Brixton Academy (2003) [Video]
- Dung 34
- Dung 35 - "You're So Good for Me" (2013) (Not released on Mute)
- Dung 36 - "The Complete Singles" (2023)

=== Misc ===
- 094638796954 - Keep the Circle: B-Sides and Udder Stuff (2007) [digital-only release]

== Depeche Mode Remastered Releases ==
=== The Singles Boxsets ===
- DM BX 1 - Singles 1-6 (1991)
- DM BX 2 - Singles 7-12 (1991)
- DM BX 3 - Singles 13-18 (1991)
- DM BX 4 - Singles 19-24 (2004)
- DM BX 5 - Singles 25-30 (2004)
- DM BX 6 - Singles 31-36 (2004)

=== The Collectors Editions ===
- DM CD 1 / DM LP 1- Speak & Spell (2006)
- DM CD 2 / DM LP 2 - A Broken Frame (2006)
- DM CD 3 / DM LP 3 - Construction Time Again (2007)
- DM CD 4 / DM LP 4 - Some Great Reward (2006)
- DM CD 5 / DM LP 5 - Black Celebration (2007)
- DM CD 6 / DM LP 6 - Music for the Masses (2006)
- DM CD 7 / DM LP 7 - Violator (2006)
- DM CD 8 / DM LP 8 - Songs of Faith and Devotion (2006)
- DM CD 9 / DM LP 9 - Ultra (2007)
- DM CD 10 / DM LP 10 - Exciter (2007)

== Erasure Remastered Releases ==
- EBX1 - Singles Box Set 1 (1999)
- EBX2 - Singles Box Set 2 (1999)
- EBX3 - Singles Box Set 3 (2001)
- EBX4 - Singles Box Set 4 (2001)
- LCDSTUMM55 - The Innocents - 21st Anniversary Deluxe Edition (2009)
- LCDSTUMM25 - Wonderland - 25th Anniversary Expanded Edition (2011)
- CDXSTUMM35 - The Circus - Special Expanded Edition (2011)
- EBX5 - From Moscow To Mars - An Erasure Anthology (2016)
- EBX6 - Singles Box Set 5 (2018) [digital-only release]
- EBX7 - Singles Box Set 6 (2019) [digital-only release]
- LCDSTUMM75 - Wild! - 30th Anniversary Deluxe Edition (2019)
- LCDSTUMM95 - Chorus - Remastered 3CD Deluxe Edition (2020)

== Yazoo Remastered Releases ==
- YAZBOX 1 - In Your Room Anthology Boxset (2008)
- YAZLP/CDBX01 - Four Pieces Anthology Vinyl Boxset / Three Pieces Anthology CD Boxset (2018)

== Nick Cave & The Bad Seeds Remastered Releases ==
- SEEDS1 - From Her To Eternity (2009)
- SEEDS2 - The Firstborn Is Dead (2009)
- SEEDS3 - Kicking Against The Pricks (2009)
- SEEDS4 - Your Funeral... My Trial (2009)
- SEEDS5 - Tender Prey (2010)
- SEEDS6 - The Good Son (2010)
- SEEDS7 - Henry's Dream (2010)
- SEEDS8 - Let Love In (2011)
- SEEDS9 - Murder Ballads (2011)
- SEEDS10 - The Boatman's Call (2011)
- SEEDS11 - No More Shall We Part (2011)
- SEEDS12 - Nocturama (2012)
- SEEDS13 - Abattoir Blues/The Lyre of Orpheus (2012)
- SEEDS14 - Dig, Lazarus, Dig!!! (2012)
- SEEDS15 - Lovely Creatures: The Best of Nick Cave and the Bad Seeds (2017)
- 12SEEDS1 - "The Mercy Seat" (2010)
