= Miranda Sex Garden =

English band

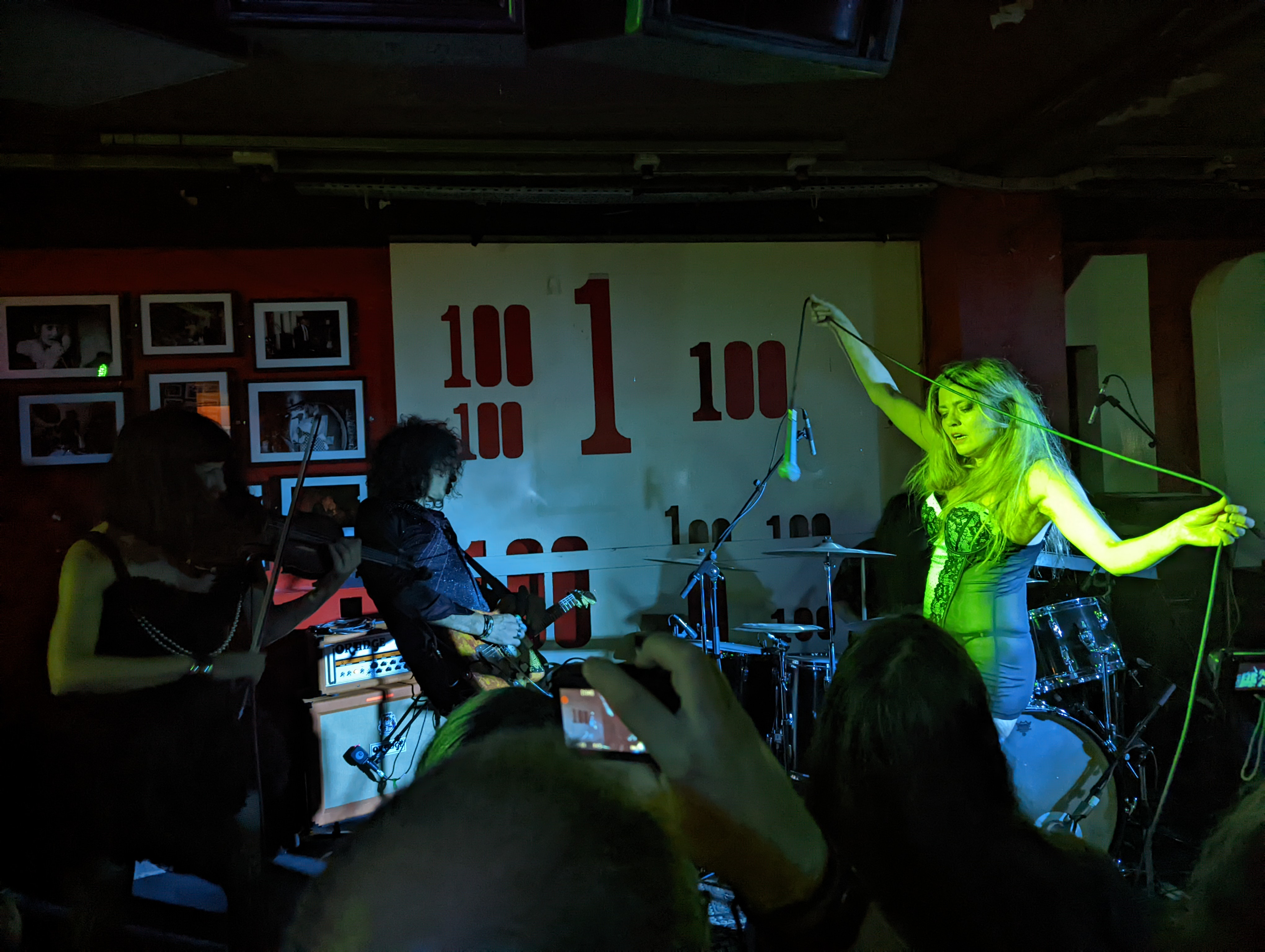
- Miranda Sex Garden in 2022

Background information
- Origin: London, England
- Genres: Gothic rock; darkwave
- Years active: 1990–2000; 2022–present
- Labels: Mute; SugarDaddy
- Spinoffs: Mediæval Bæbes
- Members: Katharine Blake; Trevor Sharpe; Teresa Casella; Bev Lee Harling; Justine Armatage; Jimmy Martin
- Past members: Jocelyn West; Kelly McCusker; Donna McKevitt; Ben Golomstock; Hepzibah Sessa; Mike Servent; Kim Fahey; Barney Hollington; Kavus Torabi; Emmett Elvin
- Website: mirandasexgarden.com (Archived on 26 January 2013)

Miranda Sex Garden is an English band from London, formed in 1990 by Katharine Blake, Kelly McCusker and Jocelyn West. Initially a trio performing a cappella madrigals, the group signed with Mute Records and released its debut album, Madra, in 1991. Its subsequent work incorporated elements of gothic rock, darkwave and industrial. The band released three further albums: Suspiria (1993), Fairytales of Slavery (1994) and Carnival of Souls (2000). After the members pursued other projects in the early 2000s, including Blake's work with Mediæval Bæbes, the band reunited in 2022 and released the EP Velventine in 2024.

== History ==
=== Origins and Madra (1990–1991) ===
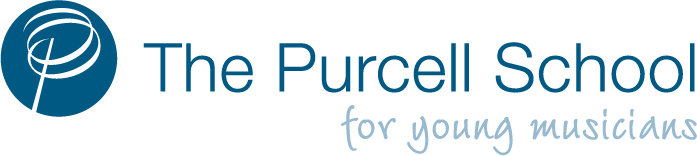
All three founding members of Miranda Sex Garden attended the Purcell School, the oldest specialist music school in the UK.

Miranda Sex Garden was formed in London in 1990 by Katharine Blake, Kelly McCusker and Jocelyn West, who had all attended the Purcell School for Young Musicians. Initially, the trio performed Elizabethan madrigals as street musicians. While busking on Portobello Road, they caught the attention of musician Barry Adamson. He invited them to contribute vocals to the soundtrack of the film Delusion, including the song "Il Solitario". Daniel Miller subsequently signed the group to Mute Records.

The band released its debut single, "Gush Forth My Tears", on 22 April 1991. The track was a madrigal arrangement with a rhythm track mixed by Danny Rampling. Produced by Tony Faulkner, the debut album Madra followed on 6 August. It consists of 25 a cappella madrigals and reached number 8 on the UK Independent Albums Chart.

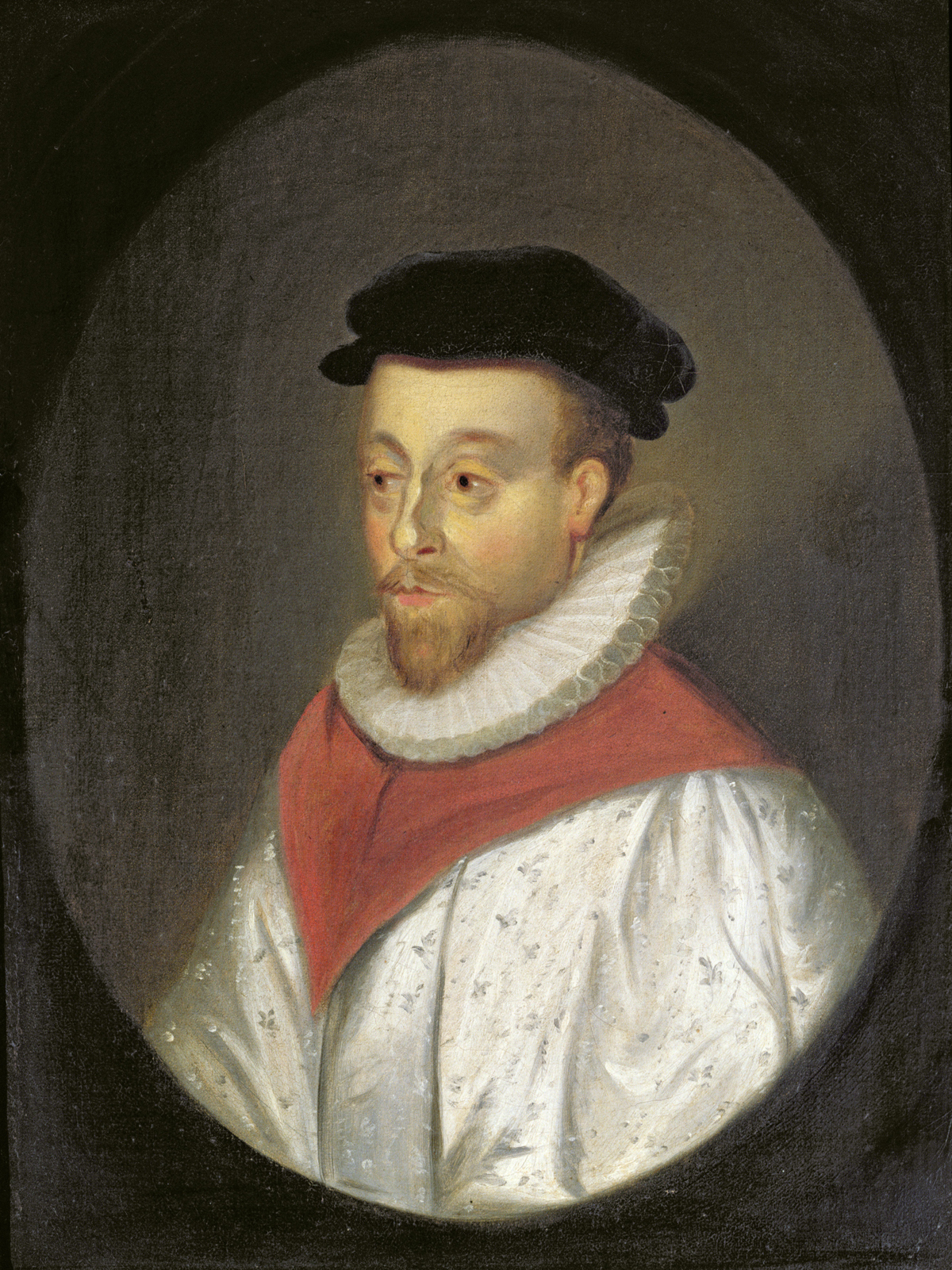
Miranda Sex Garden's debut album, Madra, consists entirely of a cappella pieces, including "The Silver Swan", one of the best-known English madrigals, composed by Orlando Gibbons (1583–1625).

=== Development, Iris and Suspiria (1992–1993) ===
In January 1992, Music Week featured Miranda Sex Garden in its roundup of 1991's new signings, describing it as a 'useful barometer' of the kinds of artists record companies expected to succeed in the 1990s. That same year, founding member Jocelyn West left the band. She later worked with the medieval music ensemble Sinfonye, led by Stevie Wishart, and collaborated with David Lynch on Lux Vivens (1998), an album of music by Hildegard von Bingen.

With the addition of Ben Golomstock (guitar, bass, organ) and Trevor Sharpe (drums, percussion, bass), the band expanded beyond the a cappella madrigal style of its debut. The EP Iris, released in May 1992, introduced string instruments, with Katharine Blake and Kelly McCusker on violin and new member Donna McKevitt on viola and vocals. The new line-up performed alongside Nick Cave, the Balanescu Quartet and Levitation.

The singles "Play" and "Sunshine" preceded the release of the band's second album, Suspiria. Produced by Paul Kendall for Mute Records, the album was released on 30 March 1993. Building on the rock-oriented sound of Iris, it combined the madrigal-style vocal harmonies of Madra with percussion, bass, strings, keyboard, church organ and distorted guitar. According to Billboard, this stylistic shift arose more from experimentation following the arrival of Golomstock and Sharpe than from a deliberate change in direction.

Contemporary reviews highlighted the "combination of purity and distortion" and the contrast between ethereal vocals and heavy instrumentation, which according to Musician, "gives new meaning to the term 'gothic rock'", while Audion described the new style as 'gothic-progressive'. Miranda Sex Garden also contributed to the soundtrack of Derek Jarman's film Blue (1993), composed by Simon Fisher Turner, alongside artists including Brian Eno and others. In September, Blake and McKevitt provided backing vocals for Nick Cave's song "Do You Love Me? (Part 2)".

McCusker left the band in late 1993 to pursue a career in classical music, leaving Blake as the only remaining original member. Hepzibah Sessa, probably already part of the tour line-up in May, subsequently contributed keyboards, viola and violin to the recording of Fairytales of Slavery. Earlier that year, Miranda Sex Garden had toured with Einstürzende Neubauten before supporting Depeche Mode on the European leg of their 1993 Devotional Tour. During the tour, Sessa began a relationship with Depeche Mode member Alan Wilder. She left Miranda Sex Garden after the tour and later worked with Wilder on his Recoil project.

=== Fairytales of Slavery and first hiatus (1994–1998) ===
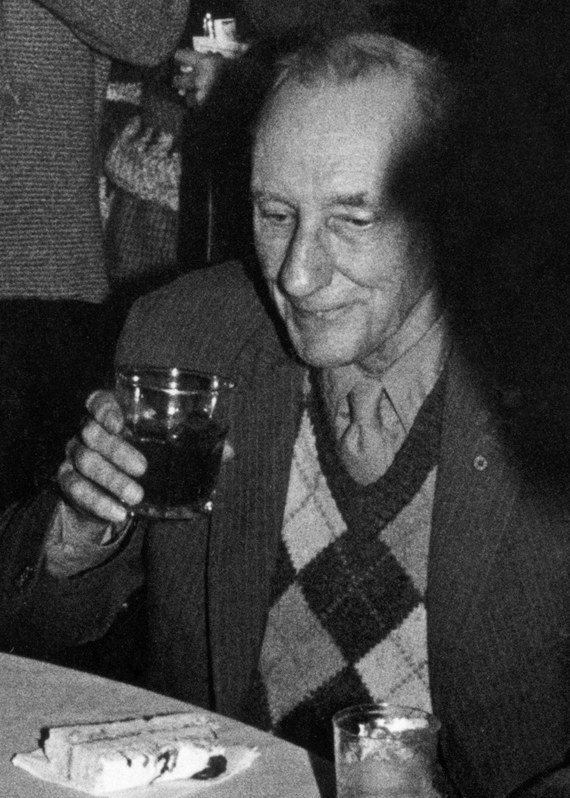
William S. Burroughs' recordings and writings influenced the industrial music movement. The genre became an important part of Miranda Sex Garden's sound; the band's name itself was taken from Burroughs' novel The Ticket That Exploded.

Kim Fahey played bass guitar on Miranda Sex Garden's third album, Fairytales of Slavery, released on 9 May 1994, as well as electric guitar on two tracks. Produced by Alexander Hacke of Einstürzende Neubauten, the album combines female vocal harmonies with heavy rhythms and 'driving electric textures'. Hacke's bandmate F. M. Einheit contributed experimental industrial sound elements using stones and an electric drill, an approach that can be related to musique concrète. Contemporary reviews highlighted the album's experimental character, with The Washington Post singling out the songs "Serial Angels" and "Peep Show", while CMJ New Music noted more driving rhythms, a 'sinister undercurrent of noise', and particularly highlighted the dynamism of "The Wooden Boat". The band released "Peep Show" as a single later that year, following a performance of the song at a London Tower Records showcase in which the members appeared naked.

Miranda Sex Garden's live performances also incorporated avant-garde and theatrical elements. In October 1994, the Los Angeles Times described the band's music as "Gothic-punk cabaret". The group was associated with the 'Lunatic Fringe' club nights, which later developed into the 'Waikiki Lounge', founded by Ben Golomstock and Trevor Sharpe. A 1995 article in The Independent described the events as a multimedia performances combining music, dance, film projections, theatre and poetry. During this period, the band also adopted the alter ego "The Waltzing Maggots" for performances at London's fetish club Torture Garden.

Two further members joined the band during this period, Teresa Casella replacing Fahey on bass guitar and Mike Servent replacing Hepzibah Sessa on keyboards. In 1995, Miranda Sex Garden toured with several bands including Hole, supporting her Live Through This Tour. The band subsequently parted ways with Donna McKevitt and Mute Records and went on hiatus, as its members pursued other musical projects.

In 1996, Blake and Dorothy Carter founded Mediæval Bæbes, an all-female a cappella ensemble specialising in early music. Teresa Casella was among its early members. The group's debut album, Salva Nos, reached number 2 on the UK Classical Charts; Billboard reported sales of 25,000 copies in the first week. Trevor Sharpe went on to play drums with Minty and co-founded the band The Servant. In 1998, Donna McKevitt released Translucence: A Song Cycle, setting poems by filmmaker Derek Jarman to music, with Kelly McCusker contributing soprano vocals.

=== First reunion, Carnival of Souls and second hiatus (1999–2021) ===
Blake, Golomstock, Sharpe, Servent and Casella reunited around 1999, joined by Barney Hollington on violin and Hammond organ. On 11 July 2000, they released Carnival of Souls on SugarDaddy Records, a label co-founded by Blake. The Independent described the album as more coherent and accessible than the band's earlier work, highlighting its fuller sound, Blake's jazz-influenced vocals and stronger songwriting. Exclaim! similarly praised its broader instrumentation and styliatic range, while retaining the band's signature gothic and industrial rock sound. The track "Tonight" appeared on the single "Tonight / Sex Garden", released that year.

As Blake increasingly focused on the Mediæval Bæbes and other projects, Miranda Sex Garden became inactive. In 2006, Golomstock released Stories from the Moon, featuring musicians associated with Miranda Sex Garden and Blake's other collaborations. A contemporary review described the album as drawing on Miranda Sex Garden's sound while combining ambient and experimental elements. Blake released her solo album Midnight Flower in 2007, while West released her debut solo album, Salt Bird, in March 2009.

=== Second reunion (2022–present) ===
In 2022, Miranda Sex Garden reunited after a 22-year hiatus with a sold-out concert at London's 100 Club on 28 July. The line-up comprised Blake, Sharpe, Casella and Servent, all of whom had played on Carnival of Souls, alongside violinist Bev Lee Harling, Blake's bandmate in Mediæval Bæbes, and guitarist Kavus Torabi, who replaced Golomstock, who had died in 2018. By July 2023, Emmett Elvin replaced Servent on keyboards. Elvin had previously worked with Torabi in Chrome Hoof, Knifeworld and Guapo. The band toured the UK later that year. In April 2024, keyboardist Justine Armatage joined the line-up, and the band released Velventine, its first new material in more than two decades. The track was reconstructed from raw recordings made around 2000, with Blake incorporating Golomstock's guitar parts. In May 2024, the band played its first overseas shows since 2000, touring Spain, France, Germany, the Netherlands and Belgium alongside UK dates. In 2025, Jimmy Martin replaced Torabi on guitar.

== Artistry ==
=== Musical style ===
Miranda Sex Garden's debut album Madra consisted entirely of a cappella performances of traditional British Renaissance madrigals. With the addition of rock instruments and strings, the style subsequently evolved into a blend of gothic rock and darkwave (ethereal wave), incorporating elements of industrial and experimental music. The EP Iris also explored dream pop, while Suspiria and Fairytales of Slavery were particularly influenced by industrial music, featuring distorted guitars, driving drum rhythms and unconventional instruments. Carnival of Souls combined gothic and industrial rock with lounge jazz, shoegaze and soundtrack-inspired elements. On this album, as well as in the band's reunion-era live performances, critics also pointed to influences from prog rock.

=== Influences ===
Miranda Sex Garden drew on Renaissance music and traditional medieval folk music. The band's founding members met at the Purcell School, where Katharine Blake developed an interest in Elizabethan madrigals. She also particularly enjoyed the music of the 12th-century composer Hildegard von Bingen. The original trio shared a strong interest in Prince and would perform an a cappella version of his song "Under the Cherry Moon". Donna McKevitt cited Henry Rollins and Nick Cave as sources of inspiration.

After Ben Golomstock and Trevor Sharpe joined the group, Miranda Sex Garden developed from its predominantly vocal and classical approach into an avant-garde gothic rock band. Golomstock's interest in horror cinema influenced the band's aesthetic, including the choice of Suspiria as the title of their second album, after Dario Argento's 1977 film. The group also recorded a version of "In Heaven" from David Lynch's Eraserhead.

The band was influenced by the West Berlin avant-garde and industrial underground scenes, as reflected in its collaboration with Einstürzende Neubauten on Fairytales of Slavery. The album incorporated industrial and experimental sound elements, a development noted by contemporary critics.

== Band members ==
Current members

- Katharine Blake – vocals, violin, recorders, keyboards, piano, glockenspiel (1990–2000, 2022–present)
- Trevor Sharpe – drums, percussion (1992–2000, 2022–present)
- Teresa Casella – bass guitar (1994–2000, 2022–present)
- Bev Lee Harling – violin (2022–present)
- Justine Armatage – keyboards (2024–present)
- Jimmy Martin – guitar (2025–present)

Former members

- Jocelyn West – vocals (1990–1992)
- Kelly McCusker – vocals, violin, viola (1990–1993)
- Donna McKevitt – vocals, violin, viola (1992–1994)
- Ben Golomstock † – guitar, keyboards, harmonium, glockenspiel, piano (1992–2000)
- Hepzibah Sessa – vocals, keyboards, violin (1993–1994)
- Mike Servent – keyboards (1993–2000, 2022–2023)
- Kim Fahey – bass guitar (1994)
- Barney Hollington – violin, Hammond organ (1999–2000)
- Kavus Torabi – guitar (2022–2025)
- Emmett Elvin – keyboards (2023–2024)

== Discography ==
=== Albums ===
- Madra (1991)
- Suspiria (1993)
- Fairytales of Slavery (1994)
- Carnival of Souls (2000)

=== EPs ===
- Iris (1992)
- Velventine (2024)

=== Singles ===
- "Gush Forth My Tears" (1991)
- "Play" (1993)
- "Sunshine" (1993)
- "Peepshow" (1994)
- "Tonight/Sex Garden" (2000)

== See also ==
- List of gothic rock artists
- List of bands from London
- List of songs about London
