= Katharine Blake (singer) =

British singer (born 1970)

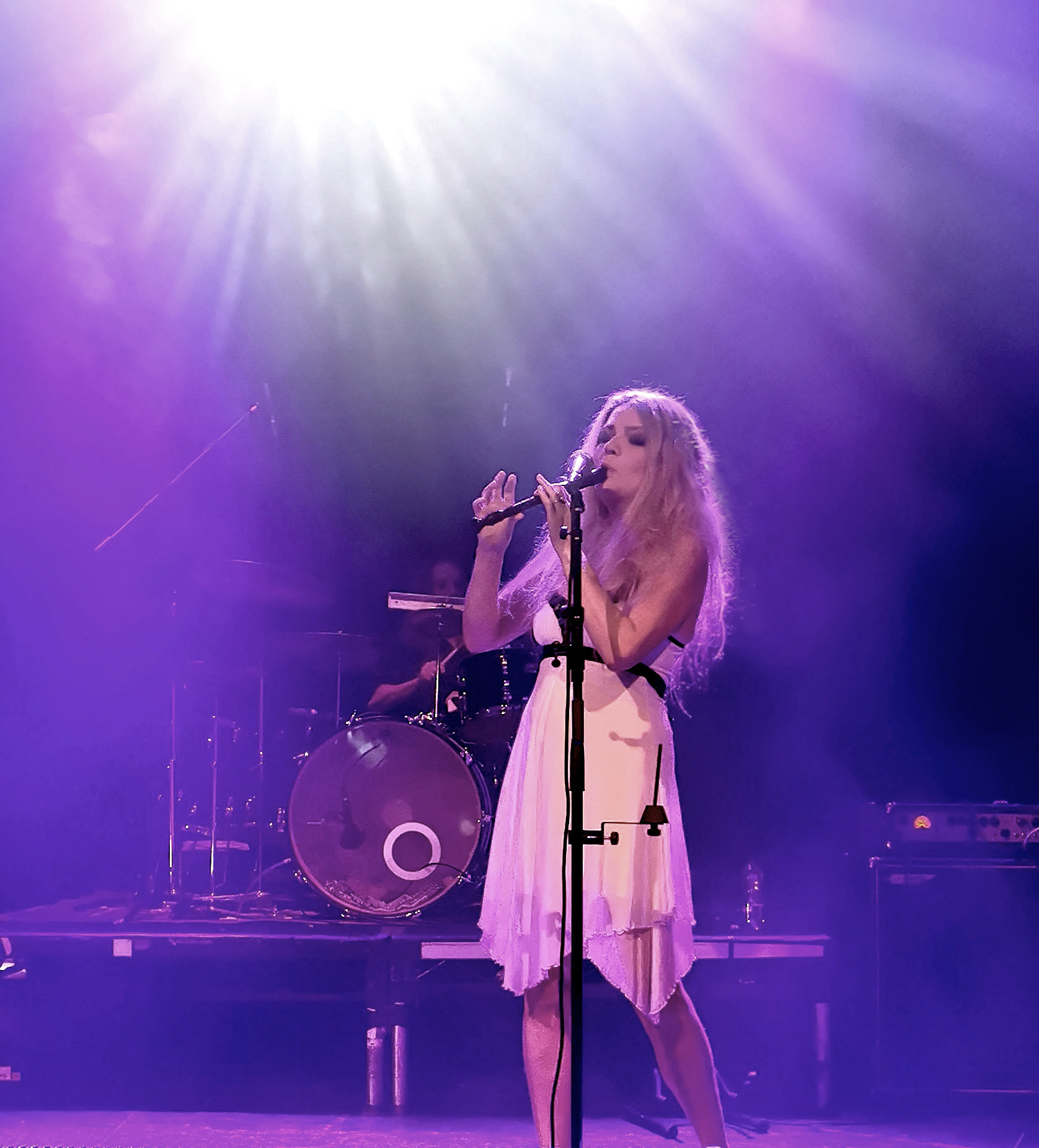
Katharine Blake performing live with Miranda Sex Garden during their 2023 UK Tour in September.

Katharine Blake (born 1970) is a British singer, songwriter and musician, originally from London. She is the lead vocalist of gothic rock band Miranda Sex Garden, and is a founding member, singer, and musical director of the musical group Mediæval Bæbes.

== Life ==
Katharine Blake is originally from London, and is a classically trained musician and alto. She is the lead vocalist of gothic rock band Miranda Sex Garden, which originally began as a group of madrigal singers. She is also a founding member, singer, and musical director of the musical group Mediæval Bæbes. She arranges music specifically for Mediæval Bæbes, as well as including original compositions. The group sing in a large number of languages, including Latin, Middle English, Russian, Middle High German, Welsh, Gaelic, Swedish and Cornish.

She was married to Nick Marsh, the lead vocalist of rock band Flesh for Lulu, until his death in 2015. They had two daughters together.

In 2006 Stories From the Moon, an ethereal collaborative concept album by Miranda Sex Garden's guitarist Ben Golomstock, was released. It included contributions from Katharine Blake.

In 2015, Katharine Blake and Nick Marsh's collaborative self-titled album From The Deep was released on Bellissima Records. It included contributions from many musicians Blake had worked with in the past, including members from Miranda Sex Garden, Naked Goat and Mediæval Bæbes.

In 2021, Katharine Blake and her partner Michael J. York (Coil, Current 93, The Utopia Strong, Teleplasmiste) released a self-titled debut album of their experimental electronic folk project The Witching Tale. In 2023 they released their second album What Magic Is This?

== Discography ==
=== Albums ===
solo

- Midnight Flower (2007)

=== Soundtracks ===
- UK18 (2017) - Song: "She Sung of Love"

=== Appearances ===
- UK18 (2017) - Our Lady of the Flowers - Directed by Andrew Tiernan
- Fall of the Louse of Usher (2002) - Unholy Reveller - Directed by Ken Russell
