= Oxygen (Swans EP) =

EP by Swans
- Released: November 25, 2014
- Recorded: 2013–2014
- Genre: Experimental rock; noise rock; post-punk; dance-punk
- Length: 20:01
- Label: Young God/Mute
- Producer: Michael Gira

Swans chronology
To Be Kind (2014)	Oxygen (2014)	The Gate (2015)

Oxygen is an EP by American experimental rock band Swans. It was released digitally on November 25, 2014 through frontman Michael Gira's own label, Young God Records.

== Background ==
The EP features four different versions of the title track "Oxygen", originally from the band's 2014 album, To Be Kind. The versions include an edit by Mute Records founder Daniel Miller, a live version recorded at Primavera Sound festival, an early version recorded at band leader Michael Gira's home studio and an acoustic version recorded at Studio Mute.

== Critical reception ==
Professional ratings
Review scores
Source	Rating
PopMatters	8/10
The Line of Best Fit	8.5/10

PopMatters critic Eric Risch wrote: "Despite none of the four versions here reaching the original's length, the Oxygen EP is not fuel efficient enough for the daily commute and provides more torque than required for a Sunday drive." Risch further added: "Revealing the true horsepower behind "Oxygen", this collection should be handled by a professional driver on a closed course."

== Track listing ==
All tracks are written by Michael Gira.

No.	Title	Length
1.	"Oxygen" (Edit)	3:04
2.	"Oxygen" (Live at Primavera)	6:49
3.	"Oxygen" (Early Version)	4:24
4.	"Oxygen" (Acoustic)	5:44
Total length:		20:01

Japanese release
No.	Title	Length
1.	"Oxygen"	7:57
2.	"Oxygen" (Edit)	3:04
3.	"Oxygen" (Live at Primavera)	6:49
4.	"Oxygen" (Early Version)	4:24
5.	"Oxygen" (Acoustic)	5:24
6.	"She Loves Us" (Live)	15:16
Total length:		43:14

== Personnel ==
Credits adapted from Oxygen liner notes

Swans

- Michael Gira – vocals, guitar, production
- Christoph Hahn – lap steel guitars, electric guitar, vocals
- Thor Harris – drums, percussion, vibes, wind instruments, vocals
- Christopher Pravdica – bass guitar, acoustic guitar, vocals
- Phil Puleo – drums, percussion, dulcimer, vocals
- Norman Westberg – guitar, vocals

Additional personnel

- Daniel Miller – editing (track 1)
- Bob Biggs – artwork
