= Easy Listening for Iron Youth =

Greatest hits album by NON
- Released: 2 December 1991
- Genre: Noise music
- Length: 63:55
- Label: Mute
- Producer: Boyd Rice

NON chronology
Blood and Flame (1987)	Easy Listening for Iron Youth (1991)	In the Shadow of the Sword (1992)

Professional ratings
Review scores
Source	Rating
Allmusic	4.5/5 stars

Easy Listening for Iron Youth: The Best of NON is a 1991 compilation album of Boyd Rice's NON recordings. It is a "best of" collection from 1975–1991.

It was released by Mute Records (UK) on CD and an ultra-limited LP (without tracks 14–16).

== Personnel ==
Boyd Rice wrote all tracks except "Predator/Prey" (by Rice and Coil) and "Cleanliness And Order" (by Rice and Daniel Miller). Percussion was provided by Michael Moynihan, Tony Wakeford, Douglas P., and Rose McDowall on "Conflagration", "Scorched Earth", and "Sunset".

== Liner notes ==
Vlad the Impaler is pictured on the front cover feasting among his victims.

"History proves that man is a beast of prey. The beast of prey conquers countries, founds great realms by subjugation of the other subjugators, forms states and organizes civilizations in order to enjoy his booty in peace... Attack and defence, suffering and struggle, victory and defeat, domination and servitude, all sealed with blood; this is the entire history of the human race..." — Richard Wagner

"There is a demon in man that should be exercised, not exorcised" — Anton Szandor LaVey

"The sounds that issue forth from the recordings of Boyd Rice (a.k.a. NON) have been known to cause anxiety attacks and even physical illness in the faint of heart and weak of mind. The bold and adventurous few however, will find this music to be pure balm. This swirling vortex of sound is mood music, pure and simple; like some soundtrack to a frenzied blood-letting at the foot of the mongol steppes. There is no better tonic I know for today's true connoisseurs of that stimulating region that exists one step beyond good and evil."— Adam Parfrey, editor of Apocalypse Culture

== Dedication ==
This recording is respectfully dedicated to history's men of steel: Gabriele D'Annunzio, Vlad the Impaler, Hassan Sabbah, Nero, Anton Szandor LaVey, Roi D'Ys, Jack the Ripper, Marquis de Sade, the hero of Green River, Ghengis Khan, Diocletian, Charles Manson & Ayahtolla Khomeni. May their spirit live forever.

== Track listing ==
1. "Iron Destiny"
2. "Conflagration"
3. "Rise"
4. "Carnis Vale"
5. "Cruenta Voluptas"
6. "Tourist Trap"
7. "Fire In The Organism"
8. "Father's Day"
9. "Scorched Earth" (lyrics from Ragnar Redbeard's "The Logic of Today")
10. "Predator/Prey" (by Boyd Rice and Coil. The track was also released on Coil's Unnatural History under the title "His Body Was A Playground For The Nazi Elite.")
11. "There Was Never A Moment When Evil Was Real"
12. "Eternal Ice"
13. "Sunset"
14. "Cleanliness And Order" (by Boyd Rice and Daniel Miller)
15. "Defenestration"
16. "Embers"
