= Fairytales of Slavery =

Studio album by Miranda Sex Garden
- Released: 9 May 1994
- Genre: Gothic rock
- Length: 53:39
- Label: Mute
- Producers: Alexander Hacke, Miranda Sex Garden

Miranda Sex Garden chronology
Suspiria (1993)	Fairytales of Slavery (1994)	Carnival of Souls (2000)

Professional ratings
Review scores
Source	Rating
AllMusic	4/5 stars
Q	2/5 stars

Fairytales of Slavery is the penultimate release by Miranda Sex Garden, issued on Mute Records in May 1994. Produced in part by Alexander Hacke of Einstürzende Neubauten, the album blends a great number of elements of different genres, including gothic rock, darkwave, industrial, classical and ambient.

== Track listing ==
1. "Cut" – 4:58
2. "Fly" – 3:41
3. "Peep Show" – 3:49
4. "The Wooden Boat" – 6:20
5. "Havana Lied" – 2:12 (written by Kurt Weill and Bertolt Brecht)
6. "Cover My Face" – 3:58
7. "Transit" – 2:54
8. "Freezing" – 2:23
9. "Serial Angels" – 3:21
10. "Wheel" – 6:14
11. "Intermission" – 1:38
12. "The Monk Song" – 3:25
13. "A Fairytale About Slavery" – 8:49 (includes an untitled, instrumental hidden track)
