= Suspiria (Miranda Sex Garden album) =

Studio album by Miranda Sex Garden
- Released: 30 March 1993
- Genres: Gothic rock; darkwave
- Length: 59:02
- Label: Mute
- Producer: Paul Kendall

Miranda Sex Garden chronology
Iris (1992)	Suspiria (1993)	Fairytales of Slavery (1994)

Professional ratings
Review scores
Source	Rating
AllMusic	4.5/5 stars
Chicago Tribune	1.5/4 stars
The Encyclopedia of Popular Music	3/5 stars

Suspiria is the second album by Miranda Sex Garden, released in 1993. It saw them moving further into the sounds of darkwave and gothic rock.

The LP edition contains a slightly different track list from the CD and cassette versions, and does not include the band's rendition of the Richard Rodgers and Lorenz Hart song "My Funny Valentine". Instead, it closes with an a cappella version of "Feed".

== Production ==
Suspiria is the second studio album by Miranda Sex Garden, continuing the band's evolution from purely a cappella madrigals on Madra (1991) to the incorporation of multiple instruments. In addition to the string instruments played by the three singers, rock instruments such as guitar, drums, and bass had already been added on the previous EP, Iris (1992). According to Billboard, this stylistic shift arose more from experimentation following the arrival of guitarist Ben Golomstock and drummer Trevor Sharpe than from a deliberate change in direction.

Produced by Paul Kendall for Mute Records, Suspiria combines madrigal-influenced harmonies with percussion, bass, strings, keyboards, church organ, and distorted guitars. Its contrast between ethereal vocals and heavier instrumental passages moves the band further toward gothic rock and darkwave.

== Critical reception ==
AllMusic wrote that "the group's vocal style is more pungent and aggressive, with the heretofore dulcet tones of the group now transformed into wild, banshee-like shrieks and snarls." Trouser Press wrote: "Reconfiguring itself for each song, MSG shifts comfortably between string-driven rock and more exotic mixtures, allowing the three soaring sopranos ... to dominate regardless."

== Track listing ==
1. "Ardera Sempre" – 4:52
2. "Open Eyes" – 6:30
3. "Sunshine" – 5:28
4. "Distance" – 3:22
5. "Play" – 4:16
6. "In Heaven" – 4:05
7. "Bring Down the Sky" – 7:35
8. "Feed" – 5:56
9. "Inferno" – 7:55
10. "Willie Biddle and His Waltzing Maggot" – 3:33
11. "My Funny Valentine" – 5:26
