= Erasure discography =

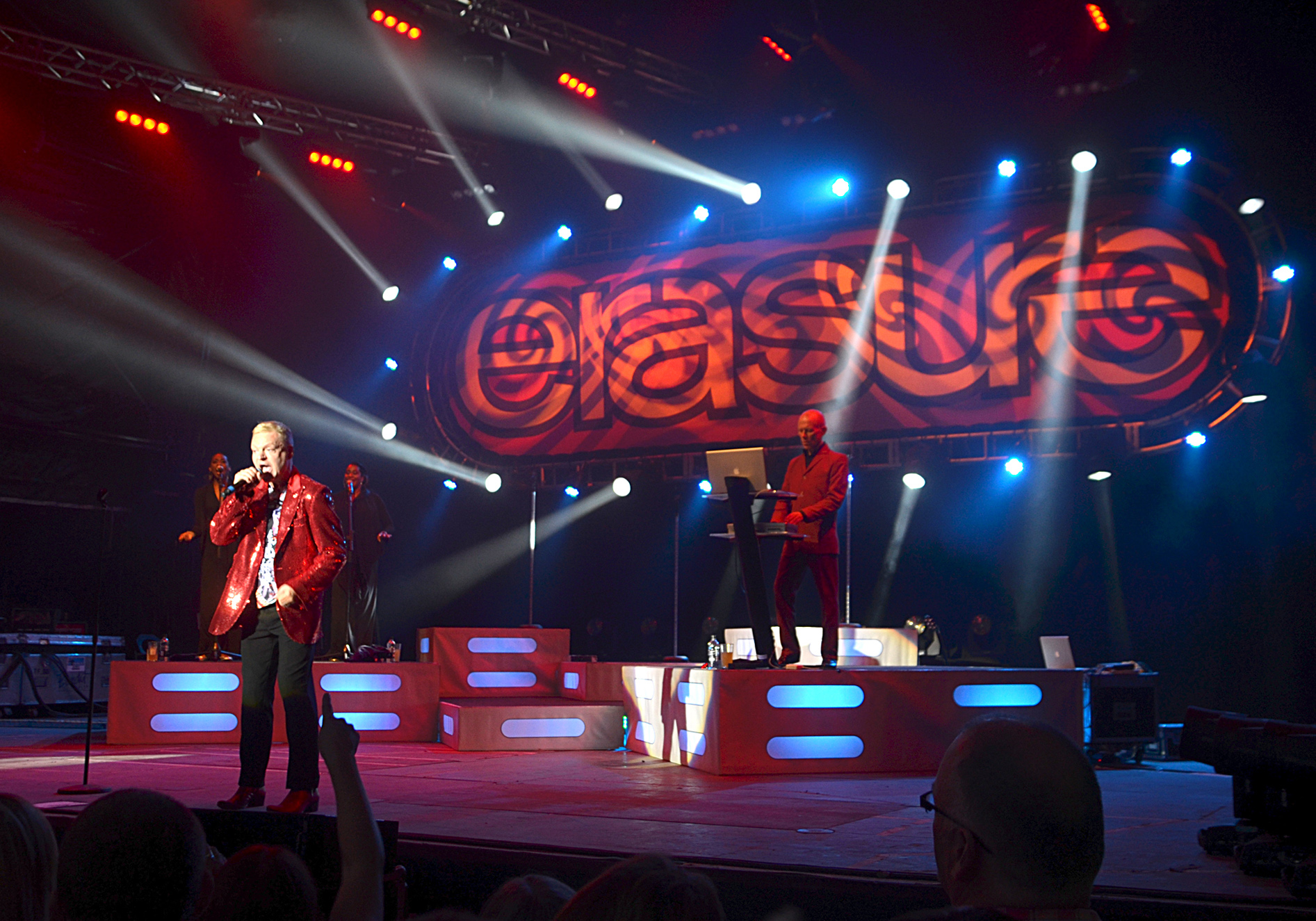
- Erasure performing in Delamere Forest in July 2011
- Studio albums: 19
- Extended plays: 13
- Live albums: 6
- Compilation albums: 9
- Singles: 62
- Video albums: 14
- Music videos: 49

Erasure are an English synth-pop duo who have released 19 studio albums, six live albums, nine compilation albums, seven box sets, 14 extended plays, 62 singles, 14 video albums and 50 music videos. Erasure consists of keyboardist Vince Clarke and singer Andy Bell.

Erasure made their debut in 1985. Their third studio album, The Innocents (1988), reached number one on the UK Albums Chart, becoming the first of four consecutive albums to reach the top position. From 1986 to 2007, the duo achieved 32 consecutive top-40 singles on the UK Singles Chart, while attaining three top-20 singles on the US Billboard Hot 100: "A Little Respect", "Chains of Love", and "Always". By 2009, 34 of their 45 singles and EPs (eight of which were not eligible to chart in England) had made the UK top 40, with 17 climbing into the top 10.

== Albums ==
=== Studio albums ===
List of studio albums, with selected chart positions and certifications
Title	Details	Chart positions										Certifications
Title	Details	UK	AUS	AUT	DEN	GER	NLD	NZ	SWE	SWI	US	Certifications
Wonderland	Released: 2 June 1986; Label: Mute	71	89	—	—	20	—	—	13	—	—	
The Circus	Released: 30 March 1987; Label: Mute	6	97	—	—	16	—	40	12	9	190	BPI: Platinum
The Innocents	Released: 18 April 1988; Label: Mute	1	—	—	—	8	—	50	13	15	49	BPI: 2× Platinum; RIAA: Platinum
Wild!	Released: 16 October 1989; Label: Mute	1	107	—	—	16	—	—	20	24	57	BPI: 2× Platinum
Chorus	Released: 14 October 1991; Label: Mute	1	93	5	—	15	—	—	14	21	29	BPI: Platinum
I Say I Say I Say	Released: 17 May 1994; Label: Mute	1	107	2	—	6	85	—	3	17	18	BPI: Gold
Erasure	Released: 23 October 1995; Label: Mute	14	175	33	—	87	—	—	26	—	82	BPI: Silver
Cowboy	Released: 31 March 1997; Label: Mute	10	74	27	—	34	—	—	19	—	43	
Loveboat	Released: 23 October 2000; Label: Mute	45	—	—	—	48	—	—	57	—	—	
Other People's Songs	Released: 27 January 2003; Label: Mute	17	—	—	31	17	—	—	—	—	138	
Nightbird	Released: 25 January 2005; Label: Mute	27	—	—	25	22	—	—	34	—	154	
Union Street	Released: 3 April 2006; Label: Mute	102	—	—	—	—	—	—	—	—	—	
Light at the End of the World	Released: 21 May 2007; Label: Mute	29	—	—	—	42	—	—	—	—	127	
Tomorrow's World	Released: 3 October 2011; Label: Mute	29	—	—	20	35	—	—	—	—	61	
Snow Globe	Released: 11 November 2013; Label: Mute	49	—	—	—	100	—	—	—	—	— (Note: Snow Globe did not enter the Billboard 200, but peaked at number 162 on the Top Current Album Sales chart.)	
The Violet Flame	Released: 22 September 2014; Label: Mute	20	—	—	5	41	—	—	37	—	48	
World Be Gone	Released: 19 May 2017; Label: Mute	6	186	—	—	28	—	—	15	69	137	
The Neon	Released: 21 August 2020; Label: Mute	4	—	49	—	11	—	—	—	—	— (Note: The Neon did not enter the Billboard 200, but peaked at number 25 on the Top Album Sales chart and at number 22 on the Top Current Album Sales chart.)	
Day-Glo (Based on a True Story)	Released: 12 August 2022; Label: Mute	29	—	—	—	13	—	—	—	100	—	
Radio!! Radio!!	Released: 12 March 2027; Label: Mute	To be released										
"—" denotes a recording that did not chart or was not released in that territory.

=== Compilation albums ===
List of compilation albums, with selected chart positions and certifications
Title	Details	Chart positions										Certifications
Title	Details	UK	AUS	AUT	CAN	GER	NZ	SWE	SWI	US	US Dance	Certifications
The Two Ring Circus	Released: November 1987; Label: Mute	—	—	—	—	—	—	—	—	186	—	
Pop! The First 20 Hits	Released: November 1992; Label: Mute	1	122	4	40	12	40	15	18	112	—	BPI: 3× Platinum; BVMI: Gold; RIAA: Gold
Hits! The Very Best of Erasure	Released: October 2003; Label: Rhino, EMI	15	—	—	—	54	—	—	—	—	7	BPI: Platinum
Total Pop! The First 40 Hits	Released: February 2009; Label: Mute	21	—	—	—	—	—	—	—	—	—	
Pop2! The Second 20 Hits	Released: February 2009; Label: Mute	—	—	—	—	—	—	—	—	—	—	
Essential	Released: March 2012; Label: Mute	—	—	—	—	—	—	—	—	—	—	
Always: The Very Best of Erasure	Released: October 2015; Label: Mute	9	—	—	—	42	—	—	—	—	—	BPI: Gold
World Beyond	Released: 9 March 2018; Label: Mute	47	—	—	—	—	—	—	—	— (Note: World Beyond did not enter the Billboard 200, but peaked at number 91 on the Top Album Sales chart and at number 74 on the Top Current Album Sales chart.)	—	
The Neon Remixed	Released: 30 July 2021; Label: Mute	33	—	—	—	—	—	—	—	—	—	
"—" denotes a recording that did not chart or was not released in that territory.

=== Live albums ===
Title	Year
The Erasure Show	2005
Acoustic Live	2006
Live at the Royal Albert Hall	2007
On the Road to Nashville	2007
Tomorrow's World Tour (Live at the Roundhouse)	2011
World Be Live	2018
The Neon Live	2022

=== Box sets ===
Title	Year
Singles: EBX 1	1999
Singles: EBX 2	1999
Singles: EBX 3	2001
Singles: EBX 4	2001
EBX 5: From Moscow to Mars	2016
Singles: EBX 6	2018
Singles: EBX 7	2019
Singles: EBX 8	2021

=== Erasure Information Service releases ===
Title	Year
Buried Treasure (CD album)	1997
An Evening with Erasure (CD album)	1998
Buried Treasure II (CD album)	2006
EIS Live (CD album)	2006
Pop! Treasure (digital release)	2008

== Extended plays ==
List of extended plays, with selected chart positions and certifications
Title	Year	Chart positions										Certifications
Title	Year	UK	AUT	BEL	GER	IRE	NLD	NZ	SWE	SWI	US	Certifications
Crackers International	1988	2	16	36	18	2	49	40	—	15	73	
Am I Right? EP (re-mix)	1992	22	—	—	—	—	—	—	—	—	—	
Abba-esque	1992	1	1	4	2	1	4	42	1	3	85	BPI: Gold; BVMI: Gold; IFPI AUT: Gold; IFPI SWE: Platinum
I Love Saturday	1994	—	—	—	—	—	—	—	—	—	—	
Rain Plus	1997	—	—	—	—	—	—	—	—	—	—	
Moon and the Sky Plus	2001	—	—	—	—	—	—	—	—	—	—	
Boy EP	2006	—	—	—	—	—	—	—	—	—	—	
Storm Chaser EP	2007	—	—	—	—	—	—	—	—	—	—	
Pop! Remixed	2009	— (Note: Pop! Remixed did not enter the UK Albums Chart, but peaked at number 16 on the UK Budget Albums Chart.)	—	—	—	—	—	—	—	—	—	
Erasure.Club	2009	—	—	—	—	—	—	—	—	—	—	
Phantom Bride EP	2009	—	—	—	—	—	—	—	—	—	—	
World Be Gone EP	2017	—	—	—	—	—	—	—	—	—	—	
Blue Savannah EP	2020	—	—	—	—	—	—	—	—	—	—	
Ne:EP	2021	—	—	—	—	—	—	—	—	—	—	
"—" denotes a recording that did not chart or was not released in that territory.

== Singles ==
=== 1985–1999 ===
List of singles, with selected chart positions and certifications, showing year released and album name
Title	Year	Chart positions										Certifications	Album
Title	Year	UK	AUS	AUT	BEL (FL)	GER	IRE	NLD	SWE	SWI	US	Certifications	Album
"Who Needs Love Like That"	1985	55	—	—	—	48	—	—	—	23	—		Wonderland
"Heavenly Action"	1985	100	—	—	—	—	—	—	—	—	—		Wonderland
"Oh l'amour"	1986	85	13	—	—	16	—	—	15	—	—	BPI: Silver	Wonderland
"Sometimes"	1986	2	45	10	2	2	3	2	20	3	—	BPI: Silver	The Circus
"It Doesn't Have to Be"	1987	12	—	—	17	16	19	34	—	19	—		The Circus
"Victim of Love"	1987	7	—	—	—	26	7	—	—	22	—		The Circus
"The Circus"	1987	6	—	—	—	30	6	—	—	—	—		The Circus
"Ship of Fools"	1988	6	—	—	—	9	6	—	—	12	—		The Innocents
"Chains of Love"	1988	11	—	—	—	18	6	85	—	16	12		The Innocents
"A Little Respect"	1988	4	—	—	—	34	7	—	—	28	14	BPI: Platinum	The Innocents
"Stop!"	1988	2	—	16	—	18	2	49	—	15	97		Crackers International
"Drama!"	1989	4	157	—	—	12	5	—	—	15	—		Wild!
"You Surround Me"	1989	15	—	—	—	38	10	—	—	—	—		Wild!
"Blue Savannah"	1990	3	159	—	—	12	3	48	—	—	—		Wild!
"Star"	1990	11	152	—	—	33	11	—	—	—	—		Wild!
"Chorus"	1991	3	77	20	—	17	4	72	37	10	83		Chorus
"Love to Hate You"	1991	4	—	6	15	19	5	49	4	17	—	IFPI SWE: Gold	Chorus
"Am I Right?"	1991	15	185	21	46	—	9	—	—	—	—		Chorus
"Am I Right?" (Remix)	1991	22	—	—	—	—	—	—	—	—	—		Am I Right? EP
"Breath of Life"	1992	8	—	25	—	44	8	—	—	—	—		Chorus
"Take a Chance on Me"	1992	1	13	—	—	—	—	—	—	—	—		Abba-esque
"Who Needs Love (Like That)" (Remix)	1992	10	120	18	—	27	8	—	—	31	—		Pop! The First 20 Hits
"Always"	1994	4	78	2	19	5	7	—	2	23	20	BPI: Silver; BVMI: Gold	I Say I Say I Say
"Run to the Sun"	1994	6	146	—	39	49	19	—	19	—	—		I Say I Say I Say
"I Love Saturday"	1994	20	186	—	—	69	—	—	34	—	—		I Say I Say I Say
"Stay with Me"	1995	15	170	—	—	—	—	—	13	—	—		Erasure
"Fingers & Thumbs (Cold Summer's Day)"	1995	20	198	—	—	69	—	—	—	—	—		Erasure
"Rock Me Gently"	1996	—	—	—	—	—	—	—	—	—	—		Erasure
"In My Arms"	1997	13	121	40	62	76	—	—	12	—	55		Cowboy
"Don't Say Your Love Is Killing Me"	1997	23	—	—	—	89	—	—	26	—	—		Cowboy
"Rain"	1997	— (Note: "Rain" was ineligible to chart in the United Kingdom due to its track count and length.)	—	—	—	—	—	—	—	—	—		Cowboy
"—" denotes a recording that did not chart or was not released in that territory.

=== 2000–present ===
List of singles, with selected chart positions and certifications, showing year released and album name
Title	Year	Chart positions										Album
Title	Year	UK	AUS	CAN	DEN	FIN	GER	IRE	SWE	US Dance	US Dance Sales	Album
"Freedom"	2000	27	137	—	—	—	80	—	51	—	—	Loveboat
"Moon & the Sky"	2001	—	—	—	—	—	—	—	—	—	—	Loveboat
"Solsbury Hill"	2003	10	—	—	7	—	29	—	39	—	2	Other People's Songs
"Make Me Smile (Come Up and See Me)"	2003	14	—	—	19	—	58	—	—	—	6	Other People's Songs
"Oh l'amour" (Remix)	2003	13	—	—	7	—	59	—	—	—	10	Hits! The Very Best of Erasure
"Breathe"	2005	4	—	—	1	—	35	30	33	1	1	Nightbird
"Don't Say You Love Me"	2005	15	—	8	12	—	69	—	26	—	2	Nightbird
"Here I Go Impossible Again"	2005	25	—	—	—	—	69	—	—	—	—	Nightbird
"All This Time Still Falling Out of Love"	2005	25	—	—	—	—	69	—	—	—	4	Nightbird
"Boy"	2006	—	—	—	17	—	—	—	—	—	—	Union Street
"I Could Fall in Love with You"	2007	21	—	—	4	11	69	—	—	7	1	Light at the End of the World
"Sunday Girl"	2007	33	—	—	8	—	76	—	—	—	1	Light at the End of the World
"Always" (2009 Remix)	2009	—	—	—	—	—	—	—	—	—	—	Total Pop! The First 40 Hits
"Phantom Bride" (2009 Remaster)	2009	—	—	—	—	—	—	—	—	—	—	The Innocents
"A Little Respect" (HMI Redux)	2010	—	—	—	—	—	—	—	—	—	—	Non-album single
"When I Start To (Break It All Down)"	2011	—	—	—	—	—	—	—	—	25	2	Tomorrow's World
"Be with You"	2011	— (Note: "Be with You" did not enter the UK Singles Chart, but debuted and peaked at number 4 on the UK Physical Sales Chart.)	—	—	—	—	—	—	—	7	4	Tomorrow's World
"Fill Us with Fire"	2012	—	—	—	—	—	—	—	—	—	—	Tomorrow's World
"Gaudete"	2013	—	—	—	—	—	—	—	—	18	—	Snow Globe
"Make It Wonderful"	2014	—	—	—	—	—	—	—	—	—	—	Snow Globe
"Elevation"	2014	— (Note: "Elevation" did not enter the UK Singles Chart, but debuted and peaked at number 3 on the UK Physical Sales Chart, and at number 36 on the UK Independent Singles Chart.)	—	—	—	—	—	—	—	3	—	The Violet Flame
"Reason"	2014	—	—	—	—	—	—	—	—	10	—	The Violet Flame
"Sacred"	2015	— (Note: "Sacred" did not enter the UK Singles Chart, but debuted and peaked at number 1 on the UK Physical Sales Chart, and at number 50 on the UK Independent Singles Chart.)	—	—	—	—	—	—	—	4	—	The Violet Flame
"Sometimes" (2015 mix)	2015	—	—	—	—	—	—	—	—	—	—	Always: The Very Best of Erasure
"Love You to the Sky"	2017	—	—	—	—	—	—	—	—	—	—	World Be Gone
"World Be Gone"	2017	—	—	—	—	—	—	—	—	—	—	World Be Gone
"Just a Little Love"	2017	—	—	—	—	—	—	—	—	—	—	World Be Gone
"Hey Now (Think I Got a Feeling)"	2020	— (Note: "Hey Now (Think I Got a Feeling)" did not enter the UK Singles Chart, but debuted and peaked at number 89 on the UK Singles Sales Chart.)	—	—	—	—	—	—	—	—	—	The Neon
"Nerves of Steel"	2020	— (Note: "Nerves of Steel" did not enter the UK Singles Chart, but debuted and peaked at number 98 on the UK Singles Sales Chart.)	—	—	—	—	—	—	—	—	—	The Neon
"Fallen Angel"	2020	— (Note: "Fallen Angel" did not enter the UK Singles Chart, but debuted and peaked at number 6 on the UK Physical Singles Chart, and at number 83 on the UK Singles Sales Chart.)	—	—	—	—	—	—	—	—	—	The Neon
"Secrets"	2021	—	—	—	—	—	—	—	—	—	—	The Neon Remixed, Ne:EP
"Time (Hearts Full of Love)"	2021	—	—	—	—	—	—	—	—	—	—	Ne:EP
"Wings of Love"	2026	—	—	—	—	—	—	—	—	—	—	Radio!! Radio!!
"—" denotes a recording that did not chart or was not released in that territory.

== Video ==
=== Video albums ===
Year	Title	Details	Format
1987	Live at the Seaside	1987 The Circus Tour	VHS
1989	Innocents	1988 The Innocents Tour	VHS
1990	Wild!	1989 Wild! Tour	VHS/Laser Disc
1992	Abba-esque	Music videos from the Abba-esque EP	VHS
1992	Pop! The First 20 Hits	Compilation of music videos from 1985 to 1992	VHS
1993	The Tank, the Swan & the Balloon	1992 Phantasmagorical Tour	VHS
1996	Erasure 1995–1996	Compilation of music videos from 1995 to 1996	VHS
1998	Tiny Tour	1996 Tiny Tour	VHS
2003	Sanctuary – The EIS Christmas Concert 2002	2002 Fan Club Christmas Gig	DVD
2003	Hits! The Videos	Compilation of music videos from 1985 to 2003	DVD
2004	The Tank, the Swan & the Balloon	1992 Phantasmagorical Tour	DVD (re-release)
2005	The Erasure Show – Live in Cologne	2005 The Erasure Show Tour	DVD
2007	On the Road to Nashville	2006 Acoustic Tour	DVD + CD
2008	Live at the Royal Albert Hall	2007 Light at the End of the World Tour	DVD

=== Music videos ===
Year	Title	Director
1985	"Who Needs Love (Like That)"	John Scarlett-Davies
1985	"Heavenly Action"	John Scarlett-Davies
1986	"Oh l'amour"	Peter Hamilton/Alistair Rae
1986	"Sometimes"	Gerard de Thame
1987	"It Doesn't Have to Be"	Gerard de Thame
1987	"Victim of Love"	Peter Scammell
1987	"The Circus"	Jerry Chater
1988	"Ship of Fools"	Phillip Vile
1988	"Chains of Love"	Peter Christopherson
1988	"A Little Respect"	Peter Christopherson
1988	"Stop!"	Peter Christopherson
1989	"Drama!"	The Giblets
1989	"You Surround Me"	James Lebon
1990	"Blue Savannah"	Kevin Godley
1990	"Star"	John Maybury
1990	"Too Darn Hot"	Adelle Lutz & Sandy McLeod
1991	"Chorus"	David Mallet
1991	"Love to Hate You"	David Mallet
1991	"Am I Right?"	Angela Conway
1992	"Breath of Life"	Angela Conway
1992	"Lay All Your Love on Me"	Jan Kounen
1992	"S.O.S."	Jan Kounen
1992	"Take a Chance on Me"	Philippe Gautier
1992	"Voulez-Vous"	Jan Kounen
1994	"Always"	Jan Kounen
1994	"Run to the Sun"	Nico Beyer
1994	"I Love Saturday"	Caz Gorham & Frances Dickenson
1995	"Stay with Me"	Mario Cavalli
1995	"Fingers & Thumbs (Cold Summer's Day)"	Max Abbiss-Biro
1996	"Rock Me Gently"	Max Abbiss-Biro
1996	"Sono Luminus" (Acoustic live)	Max Abbiss-Biro
1997	"In My Arms"	Dick Carruthers
1997	"In My Arms" (North American version)	Geoff Moore
1997	"Don't Say Your Love Is Killing Me"	Richard Heslop
1997	"Rain"	unknown
2000	"Freedom"	Vince Clarke
2003	"Solsbury Hill"	Vince Clarke
2003	"Solsbury Hill" (Alternative version)	unknown
2003	"Make Me Smile (Come Up and See Me)"	Jonas Odell
2003	"Oh l'amour" (Remix)	Toma & Luc
2005	"Breathe"	Christian Bevilacqua
2005	"Don't Say You Love Me"	Fizzy Eye
2005	"All This Time Still Falling Out of Love"	Uwe Flade
2007	"I Could Fall in Love with You"	Justin Eisner
2007	"I Could Fall in Love with You" (Alternative version)	Estelle Rogers
2007	"Sunday Girl"	unknown
2013	"Gaudete"	Martin Meunier & Tonya Hurley
2013	"Make It Wonderful"	Martin Meunier & Tonya Hurley
2014	"Elevation"	Tom Oxley
2020	"Nerves of Steel"	Brad Hammer
2020	"Fallen Angel"	Brad Hammer

2026 Wings of Love

== Other appearances ==
Below is a list of songs recorded by Erasure which are not available on Erasure LPs.

Song title	Year	Additional information
"Pistol"	1989	Omitted from the US version of Wonderland (1986) but appeared on Just Say Yes Volume III: Just Say Mao (1989).
"Too Darn Hot"	1990	Cover version of the 1948 Cole Porter song from Kiss Me, Kate, included on the 1990 Porter tribute album Red Hot + Blue.
"Looking Glass Sea"	1990	Appeared on the soundtrack to the film Dick Tracy.
"Rage"	1991	Collaboration with Lene Lovich which appeared on the PETA benefit album Tame Yourself. "Rage" was originally a solo LP track for Lovich in 1989.
"No More Tears (Enough Is Enough)"	1993	Billed as "k.d. lang & Andy Bell", this is a cover of the 1979 Donna Summer/Barbra Streisand disco duet. The pair had performed a raucous version live at the previous year's BRIT Awards. The somewhat more tame studio version was recorded with Erasure's Vince Clarke and produced by synth-pop super-producer, Stephen Hague. It appears on the 1993 movie soundtrack, Coneheads.
"Magic Moments"	1997	Cover of a 1957 Burt Bacharach/Hal David song, popularized by Perry Como. The Erasure version first appeared on the soundtrack to the film Lord of Illusions. Released in the US as a promotional single and on the US-only version of Cowboy.
"Amateur Hour"	1997	Collaboration with Sparks on their 1997 album Plagiarism.
"Baby Love"	2000	Cover version of the Supremes' song, included on the UK compilation album Motown Mania. Also appears on the Moon & the Sky EP.
"Early Bird"	2007	Collaboration with Cyndi Lauper, included on True Colors Tour 2007 commemorative album. Also appears on the Storm Chaser EP.
