= The Erasure Show – Live in Cologne =

Video by Erasure
- Released: 31 October 2005
- Recorded: 28 March 2005
- Venue: E-Werk (Cologne, Germany)
- Genre: Synth-pop
- Label: Mute

Erasure chronology
The Tank, the Swan & the Balloon (2004)	The Erasure Show – Live in Cologne (2005)	On the Road to Nashville (2007)

The Erasure Show – Live in Cologne is a DVD released by English synth-pop duo Erasure recorded during their sellout 2005 world tour, the Erasure Show. The DVD was released by Mute Records in 2005 and contained not only the Cologne performance but also several live performances from the 2003 Other tour, music videos from Nightbird, a behind-the-scenes featurette and interviews with band members Vince Clarke and Andy Bell.

== Track listing ==
=== Main show ===
1. "Intro (Rock-a-bye Baby)"
2. "No Doubt"
3. "Hideaway"
4. "Victim of Love"
5. "Knocking on Your Door"
6. "The Circus"
7. "Breathe"
8. "Ship of Fools"
9. "Drama!"
10. "All This Time Still Falling Out of Love"
11. "Stop!"
12. "Rapture"
13. "Ave Maria"
14. "Breath of Live"
15. "A Little Respect"
16. "I Broke It All in Two"
17. "Chains of Love"
18. "Chorus"
19. "Love to Hate You"
20. "Blue Savannah"
21. "Always"
22. "Who Needs Love (Like That)"
23. "Oh L'amour"
24. "I Bet You're Mad at Me"
25. "Sometimes"

=== Extra features ===
1. "In My Arms" (live in Copenhagen)
2. "Make Me Smile (Come Up and See Me)" (live in Copenhagen)
3. "Piano Song" (live in Copenhagen)
4. "Making of" featurette
5. Interview with Andy and Vince
6. Time Lapse
7. "Breathe" (video)
8. "Don't Say You Love Me" (video)
9. "All This Time Still Falling Out of Love" (video)

== Notes ==
- UK Release Date: October 31, 2005
- Front cover photography: Joel Huxtable
- Design: Robert Ryan / This is Real Art
- Recorded live: E Werk Stadium, Cologne on 28 March 2005.
- Audio recorded by: Will Shapland for Will Shapland Mobiles and Live Here Now
- Assisted by: Dave Loudoun and Chris Goddard
- Mixed by: Will Shapland at The Instrument
- Assisted by: David Dettori Williams & Dave Loudoun
- Vocals by: Andy Bell
- Programming, keyboards and acoustic guitar: Vince Clarke
- Backing Vocals: Valerie Chalmers and Ann-Marie Gilkes
- Costume Design: Dean Bright
- Choreography: Les Child
- Tour Manager: Andy Whittle
- Set Technician: Nik Kennedy
- Aspect Ratio: 16:9 Widescreen
- Audio: Dolby Digital 5.1 Surround & PCM Stereo

== Songwriting credits ==
- Written by: Erasure
- Published by: Musical Moments (Europe) Ltd./Minotaur Music Ltd./Sony Music Publishing (UK) Ltd.

=== Except ===
- "Make Me Smile (Come Up and See Me)"

Written by: Steve Harley
Published by: Rak Publishing Ltd.

- "Ave Maria"

Written by: Bach/Gounod
Arranged by: Erasure
Published by: Musical Moments (Europe) Ltd./Minotaur Music Ltd./Sony Music Publishing (UK) Ltd.

- "Rapture"

Written by: Chris Stein / Deborah Harry
Published by: Rare Blue Music Inc /Monster Island Music Publishing

- "Who Needs Love Like That"

Written by: Clarke
Published by: Musical Moments (Europe) Ltd./Sony Music Publishing (UK) Ltd.
