= Live at the Royal Albert Hall (Erasure album) =

2007 live album by Erasure

Live album by Erasure
- Released: CD: 10 December 2007 (UK); DVD: 7 April 2008 (UK)
- Recorded: 25 September 2007
- Genre: Synth-pop
- Label: Mute
- Producer: Gareth Jones; Erasure

Erasure chronology
Storm Chaser (2007)	Live at the Royal Albert Hall (2007)	Pop! Remixed (2009)

Live at the Royal Albert Hall is a live album released by English synth-pop duo Erasure in 2007. It is a double-CD set that is a recording of a concert appearance performed on 25 September 2007 at the Royal Albert Hall in London. This concert was a performance to promote the band's 2007 album Light at the End of the World. It was recorded and distributed in conjunction with Live Here Now and was available only through direct order and as a digital download via Live Here Now. Because of this limited availability, the album was ineligible for the UK Albums Chart.

A DVD of the same concert was released at the beginning of 2008 and got wider commercial release so that it charted at #7 in the UK music DVD chart and at #19 in the German music DVD chart.

== Track listing ==
All songs written by Vince Clarke and Andy Bell

=== Disc one ===
1. "Sunday Girl"
2. "Blue Savannah"
3. "Drama!"
4. "I Could Fall in Love with You"
5. "Fly Away"
6. "Breathe"
7. "Storm in a Teacup"
8. "Chains of Love"
9. "Breath of Life"
10. "Love to Hate You"
11. "Sucker for Love"
12. "Jacques Cousteau"

=== Disc two ===
1. "Victim of Love"
2. "When a Lover Leaves You"
3. "Ship of Fools"
4. "Chorus"
5. "Sometimes"
6. "A Little Respect"
7. "Oh l'amour"
8. "Glass Angel"
9. "Stop!"

== DVD track listing ==
1. "Sunday Girl"
2. "Blue Savannah"
3. "Drama!"
4. "I Could Fall in Love with You"
5. "Fly Away"
6. "Breathe"
7. "Storm in a Teacup"
8. "Chains of Love"
9. "Breath of Life"
10. "Love to Hate You"
11. "Sucker for Love"
12. "Victim of Love"
13. "When a Lover Leaves You"
14. "Ship of Fools"
15. "Chorus"
16. "Sometimes"
17. "A Little Respect"
18. "Oh l'amour"
19. "Glass Angel"
20. "Stop!"

Also includes a behind-the-scenes documentary
