= World Be Live =

Live album by Erasure
- Released: 6 July 2018
- Length: 96:17
- Label: Mute, Live Here Now

Erasure chronology
World Beyond (2018)	World Be Live (2018)

World Be Live is a live album by the English synthpop duo Erasure, released by Mute Records in 2018. The album is the third in a trilogy of releases, following studio albums World Be Gone in 2017 and World Beyond in 2018.

The 24-track live album was culled from two concerts at the Eventim Apollo in February 2018, which was part of the World Be Gone tour.

== Critical reception ==
Professional ratings
Review scores
Source	Rating
AllMusic	4/5 stars
Classic Pop	4/5 stars

Upon release, Marcy Donelson of AllMusic praised the "well-curated mix" of songs on the album and described Bell as giving an "emotive performance". Classic Pop considered the live material a "nostalgic celebration" and highlighted Bell's "entertaining interjections". They concluded: "It's abundantly clear, as the World Be... trilogy concludes, that Erasure have lost none of their sparkle."

== Track listing ==
No.	Title	Writer(s)	Length
1.	"Oh L'amour"	Vince Clarke, Andy Bell	3:51
2.	"Ship of Fools"	Clarke, Bell	4:04
3.	"Breathe"	Clarke, Bell	3:35
4.	"Mad As We Are"	Clarke, Bell	3:56
5.	"Just a Little Love"	Clarke, Bell	3:36
6.	"In My Arms"	Clarke, Bell	3:41
7.	"Chains of Love"	Clarke, Bell	4:00
8.	"Sacred"	Clarke, Bell, Richard X	4:40
9.	"Sweet Summer Loving"	Clarke, Bell	4:20
10.	"I Love Saturday"	Clarke, Bell	3:52
11.	"Victim of Love"	Clarke, Bell	4:17
12.	"Phantom Bride"	Clarke, Bell	3:46
13.	"World Be Gone"	Clarke, Bell	3:49

No.	Title	Writer(s)	Length
1.	"Who Needs Love (Like That)"	Clarke	3:09
2.	"Take Me Out of Myself"	Clarke, Bell	5:31
3.	"Blue Savannah"	Clarke, Bell	4:45
4.	"Atomic"	Deborah Harry, Jimmy Destri	4:36
5.	"Drama!"	Clarke, Bell	4:12
6.	"Stop!"	Clarke, Bell	3:23
7.	"Love You to the Sky"	Clarke, Bell	4:17
8.	"Always"	Clarke, Bell	3:53
9.	"Here I Go Impossible Again"	Clarke, Bell	3:30
10.	"Sometimes"	Clarke, Bell	3:30
11.	"A Little Respect"	Clarke, Bell	3:52

== Personnel ==
Erasure

- Andy Bell – vocals
- Vince Clarke – synthesizers

Production

- Will Shapland – mixing, recording
- Alex Wharton – mastering

Other

- P.A. Taylor – art direction
- Louise Hendy – painting
- Andy Sturmey – photography

== Charts ==
Chart (2018)	Peak position
German Albums (Offizielle Top 100)	100
Scottish Albums (OCC)	72
