= Acoustic Live (Erasure album) =

Live album by Erasure
- Released: 10 May 2006
- Recorded: 19 April 2006
- Genre: Synth-pop
- Label: Mute
- Producer: Erasure

Erasure chronology
Union Street (2005)	Acoustic Live (2006)	Light at the End of the World (2007)

Acoustic Live is a live album released by English synth-pop duo Erasure in 2006. It is a double-CD set that is a recording of a concert appearance performed on 19 April 2006 at the Shepherd's Bush Empire in London. This concert was an acoustic performance to promote the band's 2006 album Union Street. It was recorded and distributed in conjunction with Live Here Now and was available only through direct order from Mute Records and as a digital download via Live Here Now. Because of this limited availability, the album was ineligible for the UK Albums Chart.

The album cover art for Acoustic Live is identical to that of Union Street, except for the title written across the center.

== Track listing ==
All songs written by Vince Clarke and Andy Bell, except "Against My View" by Elizabeth Stratton

=== Disc one ===
1. "Home" – 5:46
2. "Boy" – 4:19
3. "Victim of Love" – 3:21
4. "Stay with Me" – 5:41
5. "Love Affair" – 5:09
6. "Oh L'amour" – 3:13
7. "Alien" – 4:19
8. "Blue Savannah" – 6:09
9. "Spiralling" – 2:51
10. "How Many Times?" – 3:42

=== Disc two ===
1. "Sometimes" – 5:47
2. "Tenderest Moments" – 5:36
3. "Ship of Fools" – 4:01
4. "Love to Hate You" – 5:41
5. "Against My View" – 3:51
6. "Piano Song" – 3:50
7. "Rock Me Gently" – 5:58
8. "Stop!" – 4:15
9. "Chains of Love" – 6:08
10. "A Little Respect" – 4:00

== Personnel ==
=== Band ===
- Vince Clarke – guitars / mandolin / melodica
- Andy Bell – vocals
- Valerie Chalmers – vocals / percussion
- Jill Walsh – vocals / harmonium / melodica / recorder
- Ben Wittman – percussion
- Smith Curry – pedal steel / Dobro guitar
- Richard Hammond – double bass
- Steve Walsh – guitars

=== Crew ===
- Andy Whittle – tour manager
- Troy Stewart – backline tech
- Roy Speer – backline tech
- Craig Donaldson – monitor engineer
- Matt West – FOH engineer
- Nic Ayer – lighting director
