= Union Street (album) =

Studio album by Erasure
- Released: 3 April 2006
- Recorded: 2003
- Studio: Union Street (Brooklyn, New York)
- Genre: Acoustic; country
- Length: 43:27
- Label: Mute
- Producer: Erasure

Erasure chronology
Nightbird (2005)	Union Street (2006)	Light at the End of the World (2007)

Singles from Union Street
- 1. "Boy" Released: 21 March 2006

Professional ratings
Review scores
Source	Rating
AllMusic	2.5/5 stars

Union Street is the twelfth studio album by English synth-pop duo Erasure, released by Mute Records on 3 April 2006 in the United Kingdom and on 18 April 2006 in the United States.

This album contained past Erasure songs, "re-interpreted in an acoustic or country & western style". The album was preceded in the UK and the US by the four-track Boy EP on 20 March and 4 April, respectively. Boy EP was not eligible for the UK Singles Chart and was released to US markets as a download-only. A bonus remix of "Boy" was available to US buyers of Union Street on iTunes.

The album peaked at number 102 on the UK Albums Chart, making it Erasure's only studio album to miss the top 100 to date.

== Track listing ==
All tracks are written by Andy Bell & Vince Clarke.

No.	Title	Original version appears on:	Length
1.	"Boy"	Cowboy	3:49
2.	"Piano Song"	Wild!	3:17
3.	"Stay with Me"	Erasure	4:53
4.	"Spiralling"	The Circus	2:26
5.	"Home"	Chorus	4:12
6.	"Tenderest Moments"	"Run to the Sun" single	5:13
7.	"Alien"	Loveboat	3:42
8.	"Blues Away"	I Say I Say I Say	3:59
9.	"How Many Times"	Wild!	3:30
10.	"Love Affair"	Cowboy	3:55
11.	"Rock Me Gently"	Erasure	4:29
Total length:			43:27

=== US digital bonus track ===
A remix of "Boy" by Pete Anderson was made exclusively available on iTunes to US buyers of the Union Street album download. According to the official release notes, it featured Pete Anderson (ex-Dwight Yoakam producer) on guitar, mandolin and bass, Bob Bernstein (who worked on the Academy Award-winning score for Brokeback Mountain) on pedal steel guitar and Tommy Funderburk (Mötley Crüe, Whitesnake and Boston, amongst others) on background vocals.

=== 2016 "Erasure 30" 30th anniversary BMG reissue LP ===
Subsequent to their acquisition of Erasure's back catalog, and in anticipation of the band's 30th anniversary, BMG commissioned reissues of all previously released UK editions of Erasure albums up to and including 2007's Light at the End of the World. All titles were pressed and distributed by Play It Again Sam on 180-gram vinyl and shrinkwrapped with a custom anniversary sticker.

This marked the first release of this album on vinyl.

== Related live releases ==
=== Acoustic Live ===
As with The Erasure Show tour in 2005, Erasure partnered with music distribution company Live Here Now to record and manufacture Acoustic Live, a digital download and limited edition double CD album of a concert recorded 19 April 2006 at the Shepherd's Bush Empire in London on the Union Street acoustic tour. The album was released 10 May 2006.

=== Erasure Acoustic: On the Road to Nashville ===
Capturing Erasure's 6 May 2006 Union Street tour performance at the Ryman Auditorium in Nashville, Tennessee, Erasure Acoustic: On The Road To Nashville was a DVD concert film released 29 January 2007 in the UK and 20 February in the US. It was released as an audio-only digital download on 12 February 2007.

The DVD featured The Road to Union Street (A short film), a behind-the-scenes documentary, plus fan-shot concert footage edited to two of the songs. The DVD came packaged with a CD featuring audio-only copies of most of the live tracks.

== Charts ==
Chart performance for Union Street
Chart (2006)	Peak position
UK Albums (OCC)	102
US Independent Albums (Billboard)	42
