= Rain (Erasure song) =

Single by Erasure

from the album Cowboy
- B-side: "First Contact"
- Released: 24 November 1997
- Genre: Synth-pop
- Length: 4:11
- Label: Mute (UK); Maverick (US)
- Songwriters: Vince Clarke; Andy Bell
- Producers: Gareth Jones; Neil McLellan

Erasure singles chronology
"Don't Say Your Love Is Killing Me" (1997)	"Rain" (1997)	"Freedom" (2000)

"Rain" is a song by English synth-pop duo Erasure, released as the third single from their eighth studio album, Cowboy (1997). Mute Records distributed the single on CD and vinyl in the UK and Europe. Some releases, titled Rain Plus, had so many remixes and live recordings, that the number of the tracks and their combined running-time made Rain Plus ineligible for ranking on the UK Singles Chart.

== Track listings ==
CD single #1 (INT884697-2)

1. "Rain" (Al Stone Mix)
2. "Rain" (Jon Pleased Wimmin Vocal Mix)
3. "In My Arms" (Dekkard's Dub)
4. "First Contact" (Vocal Mix)

CD single #2 (INT884760-2)

1. "Rain" (Jon Pleased Wimmin Vocal Dub)
2. "Rain" (Blue Amazon Twisted Circles Mix)
3. "Sometimes" (John "00" Fleming's Full Vocal Club Mix)
4. "First Contact" (Instrumental Mix)

12" single (12LPMUTE208)

1. "Rain" (Blue Amazon Twisted Circles Mix)
2. "In My Arms" (Dekkard Dub)
3. "Sometimes" (John "00" Fleming's Full Vocal Club Mix)
4. "Sometimes" (John "00" Fleming's 'Give it Some Welly' Dub Mix)
5. "Rain" (Jon Pleased Wimmin Vocal Mix)
6. "Rain" (Jon Pleased Wimmin Vocal Dub)
7. "First Contact" (Instrumental Mix)
8. "In My Arms" (BBE Mix)

CD single (ICDMUTE208)

1. "Rain" (Album Version)
2. "Sometimes" (Live in Oxford)
3. "Love to Hate You" (Live in Oxford)

CD EP (CDLPMUTE208)

1. "Rain" (Al Stone Mix)
2. "In My Arms" (BBE Mix)
3. "First Contact" (Vocal Mix) (Clarke, Bell, Phil Harding, Ian Curnow, Jones)
4. "Rain" (Live in San Francisco)
5. "Sometimes" (Live in Oxford)
6. "Love to Hate You" (Live in Oxford)
7. "Rain" (Jon Pleased Wimmin Vocal Mix)
8. "Sometimes" (John "00" Fleming's Full Vocal Club Mix)
9. "In My Arms" (Dekkard Vocal)
10. "Rain" (Blue Amazon Twisted Circles Mix)
11. "First Contact" (Instrumental Mix) [hidden track]
