= Nerves of Steel =

Nerves of Steel may refer to:

- Nerves of Steel (video game), a 1995 first-person shooter video game
- Nerves of Steel (song), a 2020 single by Erasure
