= Dayglo (disambiguation) =

Day-Glo Color Corp. is an American paint and pigments manufacturer.

Dayglo or Day-Glo may also refer to:

== Music ==
- Dayglo (album), a 1992 album, the first full-length album by Love Battery
- Day-Glo (Based on a True Story), a 2022 album by Erasure

== Other uses ==
- Luminous paint, paint that exhibits luminescence
  - Blacklight paint
- Rufus Dayglo, a London-based comics artist working for 2000 AD in the United Kingdom, and IDW Publishing in the United States

== See also ==
- Dayglo Abortions, a punk rock band from Victoria, British Columbia
- Dayglow, an indie rock project from Aledo, Texas
