= Moon & the Sky =

Single by Erasure

from the album Loveboat
- Released: 10 December 2001
- Recorded: 2000
- Genre: Synth-pop
- Length: 4:22
- Label: Mute
- Songwriters: Vince Clarke; Andy Bell
- Producer: Flood

Erasure singles chronology
"Freedom" (2000)	"Moon & the Sky" (2001)	"Solsbury Hill" (2003)

Alternative covers
- "Perchance to Dream", the AA side of the "Moon & the Sky" 12" vinyl

"Moon & the Sky" is a song by English synth-pop duo Erasure. Originally intended as the second single from their ninth studio album Loveboat, the album cut was remixed drastically for radio play by Jason Creasey and packaged with enough additional tracks and mixes that it could be considered an EP. Mute Records released the single in the UK under the title Moon & the Sky Plus, a similar tactic used for one of Erasure's previous singles ("Rain").

The song was written by Vince Clarke and Andy Bell and is an uptempo, electronic dance track. In its album version the song has a harsher, more techno-influenced feel. Maverick Records, Erasure's US record label at the time, requested the single remixes but ended up passing on the Loveboat album altogether and releasing Erasure from their contract, leaving Mute Records to release the US version of Loveboat in 2003.

The extended track count and running time of Moon & the Sky Plus made it ineligible for the UK Singles Chart at the time. A twelve-inch single, presented as a double A-side with a remix of "Perchance to Dream" was also released. Similar to the promo version (P12MUTE248) distributed to nightclub DJs to promote the album, the two-track record was credited to "V & A" (referring to the members of Erasure, Vince Clarke and Andy Bell, rather than naming them outright). The 12" was only available from the Mute Records' own shop (Mute Bank) and specialist dance music shops.

"Moon & the Sky" demoed as a slow, acoustic song. There are two versions recorded of this version, one in English, and another one in French, titled "Chanson". The French version was released in the From Moscow to Mars box set. There is another version which is same as the album cut, but with the additional lyrics "Gonna touch the sky, gonna reach high..", which was thought to be exclusive for JC's Heaven Scent Radio Re-Work. This "New Vocal" version was released as a promo.

== Track listings ==
=== CD single (CDLPMUTE248) ===
1. "Moon & the Sky" (JC's Heaven Scent Radio Re-Work)
2. "Moon & the Sky" (The Millionaires Radio Edit)
3. "Moon & the Sky" (Randy Roger's Ramjet Mix)
4. "Moon & the Sky" (Sleaze Sisters Anthem Mix)
5. "Moon & the Sky" (BK Mix)
6. "Baby Love"
7. "Freedom" (Acoustic)
8. "Alien" (Acoustic)
9. "Where in the World" (Acoustic)
10. "A Little Respect" (Acoustic)
- "Baby Love" was previously released on the various artists Motown Mania (2000) compilation. The four acoustic tracks were originally only available on a promotional CD.

=== 12" single (12VVA002) ===
1. "Moon & the Sky" (Murk Monster Mix)
2. "Perchance to Dream" (Jason Jinx Remix)
