= Don't Say Your Love Is Killing Me =

1997 single by Erasure

- UK CD single 1 cover

Single by Erasure

from the album Cowboy
- B-side: "Heart of Glass"
- Released: 24 February 1997
- Genre: Pop; hi-NRG; Eurodisco; synth-pop
- Length: 3:46
- Label: Mute (UK); Maverick (US)
- Songwriters: Vince Clarke; Andy Bell
- Producers: Gareth Jones; Neil McLellan

Erasure singles chronology
"In My Arms" (1997)	"Don't Say Your Love Is Killing Me" (1997)	"Rain" (1997)

Alternative cover
- US CD single cover

Music video
- "Don't Say Your Love Is Killing Me" on YouTube

"Don't Say Your Love Is Killing Me" is a song by English synth-pop duo Erasure, released as the second single from their eighth studio album, Cowboy (1997). It is an uptempo dance music song written by Vince Clarke and Andy Bell. Mute Records issued the single in the UK. For the song's release in the United States, Maverick Records requested a remix for radio. The U.S. single version of "Don't Say Your Love Is Killing Me" is different from what is on the Cowboy album; the song's intro was changed, as well as the middle eight section. An entire verse, edited out of the album version, is restored on the American single release.

On the UK Singles Chart, "Don't Say Your Love Is Killing Me" peaked at number 23, ending a chart run of 24 consecutive top-20 singles for Erasure. It also reached number 26 on the Swedish Singles Chart but did not enter the US Billboard Hot 100. Club remixes proved to be more successful, reaching number five on the Billboard Hot Dance Music/Club Play chart. The single's B-side is a live cover version of Blondie's "Heart of Glass".

== Critical reception ==
Barry Walters for The Advocate stated, "Remixed from the poptastic Cowboy album into a hi-NRG monster of proper Erasure-ian proportions, this deserves to be the synth-pop queens' return to Top 40 land." Larry Flick from Billboard magazine described it as a "bouncy pop/hi-NRG ditty that's anchored by an instantly appealing if somewhat subversively constructed chorus." He noted that singer Andy Bell's "typically intelligent words are notably dark and brooding, while partner Vince Clarke underlines the track with a vibrant, upbeat melody and a chorus that is downright anthemic." He also added, "It's a nifty trick that only shrewd and daring veterans like these could pull off so well."

Dominic Pride from Music & Media commented, "The day Vince Clarke and Andy Bell don't come up with a radio-friendly song, it will snow pink. As ever, tuneful simplicity combines with intricate production—with a singable chorus which appears a few lines into the song—and, as ever, Bell's clear voice does the lyrics a favour." A reviewer from Music Week gave it three out of five, writing that "this Euro disco number has a real Eighties feel, but sounds rather hollow. Tall Paul and Jon Pleased remixes will attract DJs."

== Track listings ==
- Cassette single (CMUTE195)
1. "Don't Say Your Love Is Killing Me"
2. "Heart of Glass"
- 12-inch single (12MUTE195)
1. "Don't Say Your Love Is Killing Me" (Tall Paul mix)
2. "Oh L'amour" (Tin Tin Out mix)
3. "Don't Say Your Love Is Killing Me" (Jon Pleased Wimmin Flashback vox)
4. "Oh L'amour" (Matt Darey mix)
- CD single 1 (CDMUTE195)
1. "Don't Say Your Love Is Killing Me"
2. "Heart of Glass" (Live at Oxford)
3. "Don't Say Your Love Is Killing Me" (Jon Pleased Wimmin Flashback vox)
4. "Don't Say Your Love Is Killing Me" (Tall Paul mix)
- CD single 2 (LCDMUTE195)
1. "Don't Say Your Love Is Killing Me" (Jon Pleased Wimmin Flashback dub)
2. "Oh L'amour" (Matt Darey Mix)
3. "Oh L'amour" (Tin Tin Out Mix)
- US CD single (Maverick: 43914-2)
1. "Don't Say Your Love Is Killing Me" (single version)
2. "Don't Say Your Love Is Killing Me" (RH Factor vocal club mix)
3. "Don't Say Your Love Is Killing Me" (Jon Pleased Wimmin Flash vocal)
4. "Don't Say Your Love Is Killing Me" (RH Factor Insulin Shock dub)
5. "Don't Say Your Love Is Killing Me" (Jon Pleased Wimmin Flash dub)
6. "Don't Say Your Love Is Killing Me" (Tall Paul mix)

== Charts ==
Chart (1997)	Peak position
Denmark (Hitlisten)	18
Europe (Eurochart Hot 100)	73
Germany (GfK)	89
Iceland (Íslenski Listinn Topp 40)	37
Israel (Israeli Singles Chart)	4
Scottish Singles Sales (Official Charts)	12
Sweden (Sverigetopplistan)	26
UK Singles (Official Charts)	23
UK Indie (Music Week)	1
US Dance Club Songs (Billboard)	5
US Dance Singles Sales (Billboard)	14

== Release history ==
Region	Date	Format(s)	Label(s)	Ref.
United Kingdom	24 February 1997	12-inch vinyl; CD; cassette	Mute	
United States	15 July 1997	Alternative radio	Maverick	
