= Boy (Erasure song) =

Song by Erasure

Song by Erasure

from the album Cowboy
- Released: 31 March 1997
- Recorded: 1996
- Genre: Synth-pop
- Length: 3:41
- Label: Mute
- Songwriters: Vince Clarke; Andy Bell
- Producers: Neil McLellan; Gareth Jones

"Boy"

Single by Erasure

from the album Union Street
- Released: 21 March 2006
- Recorded: 2005
- Genre: Acoustic; country; ambient
- Length: 3:50
- Label: Mute
- Songwriters: Vince Clarke; Andy Bell
- Producers: Vince Clarke; Steve Walsh

Erasure singles chronology
"Here I Go Impossible Again" / "All This Time Still Falling Out of Love" (2005)	"Boy" (2006)	"I Could Fall in Love with You" (2007)

Licensed audio
- "Boy" on YouTube

"Boy" is a song performed by English synth-pop duo Erasure. Originally recorded in typical synth-pop/Erasure style in 1997, the song appeared on their album Cowboy. In 2006, Erasure members Vince Clarke and Andy Bell released Union Street, an album containing past Erasure songs reinterpreted in acoustic and country and western style.

Joined by three additional non-Union Street tracks, "Boy" was released by Mute Records as the Boy EP—its extended track total made it ineligible for the UK Singles Chart. The Boy EP was released as an album teaser, several weeks before Union Street. In the United States, "Boy" was made available by Mute as a digital download only.

Also contained in the release was an acoustic version of Erasure's 1985 song "Cry So Easy", found on their debut album Wonderland. Here, Bell's original vocal was used with new instrumentation. A live recording of an acoustic version of "I Bet You're Mad at Me" is also exclusive to this release (the song originally on the Nightbird album), as is "Jacques Cousteau", an electronic Vince Clarke instrumental.

== Track listings ==
=== CD EP (CDMUTE359) ===
1. "Boy" (acoustic)
2. "Cry So Easy" (acoustic)
3. "I Bet You're Mad at Me" (live at the BBC)
4. "Jacques Cousteau"

== Charts ==
Chart (2006)	Peak position
Denmark (Tracklisten)	17
