= Am I Right? =

1991 single by Erasure

Single by Erasure

from the album Chorus
- B-side: "Carry On Clangers"; "Let It Flow"; "Waiting for Sex"; "B3"
- Released: 25 November 1991
- Genre: Synth-pop
- Length: 4:18
- Label: Mute
- Songwriters: Vince Clarke; Andy Bell
- Producer: Martyn Phillips

Erasure singles chronology
| "Love to Hate You" (1991) | "Am I Right?" (1991) | "Breath of Life" (1992) |

Music video
- "Am I Right?" on YouTube

Am I Right?

EP by Erasure
- Released: December 1991
- Length: 24:55
- Label: Mute
- Producer: Martyn Phillips

Erasure chronology
| Chorus (1991) | Am I Right? (1991) | Abba-esque (1992) |

"Am I Right?" is a song by English synth-pop duo Erasure, released in November 1991 by Mute Records as the third single from their fifth studio album, Chorus (1991). Written by Erasure members Vince Clarke and Andy Bell, the ballad peaked at number 15 on the UK Singles Chart. Additionally it was a top-10 hit in Ireland, a top-20 hit in Luxembourg and a top-30 hit in Austria. Its accompanying music video was filmed in the Netherlands.

== Critical reception ==
Upon its release as a single, Hannsjörg Riemann from German Bravo gave it three out of three, declaring it as "one of the soulful numbers" on the Chorus album. He also remarked that Clarke and Bell is "on top form in terms of composition and vocals on great "old-fashioned" synth sounds." Ned Raggett from AllMusic described it as a song that "reflects on love and aging with a gentle tone and soft hip-hop beat". The Daily Vault's Michael R. Smith felt it is "another story entirely." He added, "As my all-time favorite Erasure ballad, it has a tough chorus to memorize yet contains some wonderful imagery that pulls at the heartstrings."

David Stubbs of Melody Maker described "Am I Right?" as "another licence to print money" and commented, "As with their last two or three efforts, Vince Clarke has bucked up his ideas a bit in the bleep and burble department, but Andy Bell's larynxy gurgle irritates as much as ever." Barbara Ellen of NME viewed it as the "most melodramatic and ridiculous of torch songs". She noted the "slow, morbid chorus" and Bell's "appalling pitched" vocals. Christopher Smith from Talk About Pop Music called the song "creepy and subdued", writing that it "takes the tone down but equally classy and thought-provoking." Troy J. Augusto from Variety described it as "haunting".

== Chart performance ==
Upon its release, "Am I Right?" became the fifteenth consecutive top-20 song on the UK Singles Chart for Erasure, peaking at number 15. It also reached number nine in Ireland and number 21 in Austria. Shortly after the single release, the Am I Right? EP was released, which includes new songs and alternate versions of Erasure singles and album tracks. The EP peaked at number 22 in the UK.

== Music video ==
A music video was made to accompany the song. It pictures Andy Bell walking down through Amsterdam and sitting down at the "Homomonument" (The Gays' Monument) near the Westerkerk. Vince Clarke is seen on a sailboat, sailing on the water in the Amsterdam canal system. The video was later made available on Erasure's official YouTube channel in 2014, and had generated more than 1.1 million views as of early 2026.

== Track listings ==
- 7-inch, Mute / MUTE134 (UK)
- Cassette (CMUTE134)
1. "Am I Right?"
2. "Carry On Clangers" (edit)
3. "Let It Flow"
4. "Waiting for Sex" (edit)
- 12-inch, Mute / 12MUTE134 (UK)
1. "Am I Right?" (Dave Bascombe mix)
2. "Carry On Clangers"
3. "Let It Flow"
4. "Waiting for Sex"
- 12-inch, Mute / L12MUTE134 (UK)
1. "Am I Right?" (The Grid mix)
2. "Love to Hate You" (LFO Modulated mix)
3. "Chorus" (Vegan mix)
4. "B3"
- CD, Mute / CDMUTE134 (UK)
1. "Am I Right?"
2. "Let It Flow"
3. "Waiting for Sex"
4. "Carry on Clangers"
- CD EP, Mute / LCDMUTE134 (UK)
1. "Am I Right?" (The Grid mix)
2. "Love to Hate You" (LFO Modulated mix)
3. "Chorus" (Vegan mix)
4. "Perfect Stranger" (acoustic version)

== Charts ==
=== Original release ===
| Chart (1991–1992) | Peak position |
|---|---|
| Australia (ARIA) | 185 |
| Austria (Ö3 Austria Top 40) | 21 |
| Europe (Eurochart Hot 100) | 43 |
| Ireland (IRMA) | 9 |
| Luxembourg (Radio Luxembourg) | 20 |
| UK Singles (Official Charts) | 15 |
| UK Airplay (Music Week) | 16 |

=== Remix EP release ===
| Chart (1992) | Peak position |
|---|---|
| UK Singles (Official Charts) | 22 |

== Release history ==
| Region | Date | Format(s) | Label(s) | Ref. |
|---|---|---|---|---|
| United Kingdom | 25 November 1991 | 7-inch vinyl; 12-inch vinyl; CD; cassette | Mute | |
| United Kingdom | December 1991 | CD EP | Mute | |
| Japan | 21 January 1992 | CD | Mute | |
| Australia | 9 March 1992 | 12-inch vinyl; CD; cassette | Liberation; Mute | |
