= Fallen Angel (Erasure song) =

2020 single by Erasure

Single by Erasure

from the album The Neon
- B-side: "Remixes"
- Released: 22 October 2020
- Length: 3:50
- Label: Mute
- Songwriters: Andy Bell; Vince Clarke
- Producer: Erasure

Erasure singles chronology
"Nerves of Steel" (2020)	"Fallen Angel" (2020)	"Secrets" (2021)

Music video
- "Fallen Angel" on YouTube

"Fallen Angel" is the third and final single from the album The Neon by English synth-pop duo Erasure, released on 22 October 2020.

== Music video ==
The music video, directed and produced by Brad Hammer, features Heidi N Closet, who appeared on season 12 of RuPaul's Drag Race, and singer/actress Alexa Abraxas. The video was described as a "spooky video just in time for Halloween."

== Remixes ==
On 4 December 2020 new remixes were released headlined by Georgia. A special six-track limited-edition 12″ orange-vinyl EP (including high definition download code) was released which also featured remixes of other tracks from the album.

The third disc of the Neon Singles box set featured these remixes:

- "Fallen Angel" (Georgia remix)
- "Fallen Angel" (Georgia dub)**
- "Fallen Angel" (Georgia remix instrumental)**
- "Fallen Angel" (Confidence Man remix)
- "Fallen Angel" (Confidence Man dub)**
- "Fallen Angel" (Confidence Man remix instrumental)**
- "Fallen Angel" (Ben Rainey remix)
- "Fallen Angel" (Ben Rainey dub)**
- "Fallen Angel" (Ben Rainey remix instrumental)**
- "Shot a Satellite" (Initial Talk remix instrumental)**

** – previously unreleased

On 16 July 2021 the band released "Fallen Angel" (Saint remix) from their Neon Remixed album on streaming platforms.

== Reception ==
- PopMatters called the track "reassuring, rhythmically as well as lyrically, with Bell gently urging us on to a warm bed of Clarke's haunting synth work" and "another patented Erasure tune: emo lyrics, Bell's plaintive warbling, Clarke's inventive and luxuriant production."
- Metro Weekly said it features a "gorgeous chorus and some of the most memorable synth work on the entire album, but is ultimately dragged down by excess padding and lyrics that come off as trite."
- SLUG Magazine gave it positive review.
- Retro Pop described it as a favorite on the album.
- Affinity Magazine gave it a positive review, stating "Fallen Angel" is "about facing your fears and trying 'all of the things that give [you] love.' It's an anthem track, a song that can (and should) be used to inspire listeners. Bell's vocals and Clarke's keyboard work play together very well on this track. There's something playful about The Neon's 3rd track, a vintage sound that hearkens back to an 8-bit video game soundtrack. The interaction of vocals and instrumentals works wonders for 'Fallen Angel', conveying the message of the need to try and do the things that give you love."

== Charts ==
Chart performance for "Fallen Angel"
Chart (2020)	Peak position
UK Physical Singles (Official Charts)	6
UK Singles Sales (OCC)	83
UK Vinyl Singles (OCC)	5
