= Storm Chaser (EP) =

EP by Erasure
- Released: 24 September 2007
- Recorded: 2006–2007
- Genre: Synth-pop
- Label: Mute
- Producer: Gareth Jones; Erasure

Erasure chronology
Light at the End of the World (2007)	Storm Chaser (2007)	Live at the Royal Albert Hall (2007)

Erasure singles chronology
"Sunday Girl" (2007)	"Storm in a Teacup" (2007)	"Always" (2009 Remix) (2009)

Storm Chaser is an EP recorded by English synth-pop duo Erasure. It was released in the UK and Germany by Mute Records on 24 September 2007 and a North American release followed on October 2. The EP is available on CD, limited edition 7-inch vinyl and digital download.

Storm Chaser contains nine tracks, including new, extended and remix versions of songs taken from the band's 2007 album Light at the End of the World. Also included is the song "Early Bird", a collaboration with Cyndi Lauper. The song "Storm in a Teacup" and "Sucker for Love" were released as promo singles, the former representing the Storm Chaser EP on the 2009 Total Pop compilation in its single version.

== "When a Lover Leaves You" ==
"When a Lover Leaves You" originally appeared on Erasure's thirteenth studio album Light at the End of the World. Although the song was announced as the album's third UK single in late 2007, the song instead was included on Storm Chaser.

With this song, Erasure partnered with Apple Inc. to allow any interested musicians to create a remix of the track using the GarageBand software. Song parts were available to download within Apple's website and a winning entry was chosen by Clarke and Bell and included on Storm Chaser. Over 200 remixes were available as streaming media within Erasure's website for fans to listen to and vote on. The winning fan remix had no bearing upon which remix was chosen by the band.

Ultimately Barcelona-based producer Oscar Salguero was selected as the official winner.

== Track listing ==
=== CD (CDMUTE384) ===
1. "Storm in a Teacup" (Single Version) — 3:27
2. "Sucker for Love" (Extended Mix) — 6:37
3. "Golden Heart" (GRN's 'Golden Glow' Radio Edit) — 3:45
4. "Early Bird" (with Cyndi Lauper) — 3:11
5. "Storm in a Teacup" (Koishii & Hush Club Mix) — 7:31
6. "Sucker for Love" (DJ Manolo Remix) — 9:19
7. "Storm in a Teacup" (Extended Mix) — 5:56
8. "When a Lover Leaves You" (Oscar Salguero Remix) — 3:49
9. "Glass Angel" (The Equalateral Mix) — 7:50

=== 7" vinyl picture disc (MUTE384) ===
1. "Storm in a Teacup" (Single Version) — 3:27
2. "Sucker for Love" (Edit) — 3:30

=== Digital download ===
1. "Storm in a Teacup" (Single Version)
2. "Sucker for Love" (Extended Mix)
3. "Golden Heart" (GRN's 'Golden Glow' Radio Edit)
4. "Early Bird" (with Cyndi Lauper)
5. "Storm in a Teacup" (Koishii & Hush Club Mix)
6. "Sucker for Love" (DJ Manolo Remix)
7. "Storm in a Teacup" (Extended Mix)
8. "When a Lover Leaves You" (Oscar Salguero Remix)
9. "Glass Angel" (The Equalateral Mix)
10. "Golden Heart" (GRN's Golden Glow Remix)
11. "When a Lover Leaves You" (GRN Remix)

== Charts ==
Chart performance for Storm Chaser
Chart (2007)	Peak position
Denmark (Tracklisten)	17
UK Singles (OCC)	172
US Top Dance/Electronic Albums (Billboard)	14

== Release history ==
Country	Date
United Kingdom	24 September 2007
United States	2 October 2007
