= The Neon (album) =

Studio album by Erasure
- Released: 21 August 2020
- Recorded: 2019
- Studio: Maze (Atlanta)
- Genres: Electropop; new wave
- Length: 37:09
- Label: Mute
- Producer: Erasure

Erasure chronology
World Be Gone (2017)	The Neon (2020)	Day-Glo (Based on a True Story) (2022)

Singles from The Neon
- 1. "Hey Now (Think I Got a Feeling)" Released: 4 June 2020; 2. "Nerves of Steel" Released: 11 August 2020; 3. "Fallen Angel" Released: 22 October 2020

The Neon is the eighteenth studio album by English synth-pop duo Erasure, released on 21 August 2020 by Mute Records. The album debuted at number four on the UK Albums Chart with 8,394 copies sold in its first week.

On 30 July 2021, Erasure released a companion remix album titled The Neon Remixed, a double disc of remixes by Octo Octa, Paul Humphreys (of OMD), Gareth Jones and others. A new single was also contained within the album titled "Secrets". The album was released on CD and a limited-edition coloured vinyl.

== Background ==
The Neon was released on 21 August 2020 by Mute Records and is self-produced.

The album was recorded in Atlanta and mixed in London. The band has stated that they tried to return to their original sounds. Clarke used some of his older synths and Bell described the new album as "going back to the beginning".

The album cover was created by Paul A. Taylor. Bell said of the cover: "I love the effect of an old stone wall with a neon sign on it. To me, that always looks like the clashing of antiquity and modern-day."

The lead single "Hey Now (Think I Got a Feeling)" received its UK premiere on BBC Radio 2's The Zoe Ball Breakfast Show. "Fallen Angel" was released on 22 October 2020 as the album's third official single and debuted at number six on the UK Physical Singles Chart.

The band has stated that they usually record 10 songs for each album, but this time around they recorded many more and the record company picked the best. The remaining will be released at some point.

The album did not chart in the Billboard 200, but peaked at number 22 in the Billboard Current Album Sales chart and number 7 on the Billboard Top Dance/Electronic Albums chart.

== Reception ==
The album has received generally positive reviews.

== Track listing ==
All tracks are written by Andy Bell and Vince Clarke.

No.	Title	Length
1.	"Hey Now (Think I Got a Feeling)"	3:45
2.	"Nerves of Steel"	4:13
3.	"Fallen Angel"	3:50
4.	"No Point in Tripping"	3:49
5.	"Shot a Satellite"	3:40
6.	"Tower of Love"	3:42
7.	"Diamond Lies"	3:07
8.	"New Horizons"	3:06
9.	"Careful What I Try to Do"	3:25
10.	"Kid You're Not Alone"	4:32

== The Neon Remixed ==
The Neon Remixed is a two-disc set of remixes from The Neon, released on 30 July 2021 by Mute Records. In addition to remixes, it also includes the single "Secrets". It debuted at number 33 on the UK Albums Chart, selling 2,255 units in its first week.

=== Disc one ===
All tracks are written by Andy Bell and Vince Clarke.

No.	Title	Length
1.	"Secrets"	3:48
2.	"Hey Now (Think I Got a Feeling)" (Hi-Fi Sean Remix)	6:29
3.	"Nerves of Steel" (Andy Bell & Gareth Jones Sapphire and Steel Mix)	8:45
4.	"Fallen Angel" (Saint Remix)	5:45
5.	"No Point in Tripping" (John 'J-C' Carr & Bill Coleman 808 Beach Extended Remix)	6:07
6.	"Shot a Satellite" (GRN Extended Remix)	4:42
7.	"Tower of Love" (BSB's Stella Polaris Remix)	8:35
8.	"Diamond Lies" (Armageddon Turk Extended Remix)	4;00
9.	"New Horizons" (Matt Pop Extended Remix)	4:12
10.	"Careful What I Try to Do" (Brixxtone Extended Remix)	4:35
11.	"Kid You're Not Alone" (Theo Kottis Remix)	5:31

=== Disc two ===
All tracks are written by Andy Bell and Vince Clarke.

No.	Title	Length
1.	"Secrets" (Kim Ann Foxman's Heaven Mix)	5:56
2.	"No Point in Tripping" (Can Love Be Synth Remix)	6:21
3.	"Hey Now (Think I Got a Feeling)" (Hi-Fi Sean Dub)	5:43
4.	"Careful What I Try to Do" (Brixxtone Synthwave Dub)	4;39
5.	"Nerves of Steel" (Gareth Jones Electrogenetic Terabyte of Love Mix)	8:22
6.	"Kid You're Not Alone" (Paul Humphreys Remix)	5:18
7.	"Secrets" (Octo Octa's Psychedelic Visions Disco Dub)	14:09

== Charts ==
Chart performance for The Neon
Chart (2020)	Peak position
Austrian Albums (Ö3 Austria)	49
Czech Albums (ČNS IFPI)	85
German Albums (Offizielle Top 100)	11
Scottish Albums (Official Charts)	2
UK Albums (Official Charts)	4
UK Independent Albums (Official Charts)	1
US Top Album Sales (Billboard)	25
US Top Current Album Sales (Billboard)	22
US Top Dance Albums (Billboard)	7

Chart performance for The Neon Remixed
Chart (2021)	Peak position
UK Albums (Official Charts)	33
UK Dance Albums (Official Charts)	3
UK Independent Albums (Official Charts)	4
