= Hey Now (Think I Got a Feeling) =

2020 single by Erasure

Single by Erasure

from the album The Neon
- B-side: "Remixes"
- Released: 4 June 2020
- Length: 3:45
- Label: Mute
- Songwriters: Andy Bell; Vince Clarke
- Producer: Erasure

Erasure singles chronology
"Just a Little Love" (2017)	"Hey Now (Think I Got a Feeling)" (2020)	"Nerves of Steel" (2020)

Music video
- "Hey Now (Think I Got a Feeling)" on YouTube

"Hey Now (Think I Got a Feeling)" is the first single from the album The Neon by English synth-pop duo Erasure, released on 4 June 2020. Written by Vince Clarke and Andy Bell, the track is upbeat similar to their older 80's songs and has gotten positive reviews. The song stayed on the BBC Radio 2 A list for 4 weeks and was one of the most popular songs aired on UK radio in June and July 2020.

== Background ==
Recorded during the COVID-19 pandemic lockdown, the vocals were recorded by Bell and sent to Clarke to do the music in Atlanta. The final mix was created in London in 2020. The track was debuted on BBC Radio 2 on 4 June 2020.

A video for the song was also released that features neon writings of the lyrics and imagery, but does not contain the band members.

Bell said that "it's definitely a call-to-arms song. I always felt you can be very spiritual, you don't have to be affiliated to any religion at all. You can take the best bits of whichever religion or philosophy you want to. I think generally I'm an optimist."

In July 2021, the band announced the remix album Neon Remixed, which features remixes of the track.

== Reception ==
Newsweek said "the euphoric, danceable lead-off single 'Hey Now (Think I Got a Feeling)' hearkens to the music by the late American disco artist Sylvester—as reflected by such lines as 'Walk through the city, singing hallelujah/Wish for a lover's touch.'"

The Guardian said "Hey Now (Think I Got a Feeling)" "finds Bell beating the darkened city streets again, mildly off his box, looking for love and finding only empty hedonism, Clarke's vintage synth-scape cascading around him like sodium glow. The sound of new-old Erasure can't help but pale by comparison as the old-old classics drop—'Who Needs Love Like That', 'Blue Savannah' and 'A Little Respect' in the first half-hour alone—but they remain a band who have never lost their essence."

PopMatters said "the familiar warm shower of buoyant electronic beats evokes all the power of those dancefloors currently denied us (check out the video)."

Glorious Noise said "nobody makes dance music quite like Andy Bell and Vince Clarke who have been cranking out undeniable jams for 35 years."

== Track listing ==
Digital download (Remixes)

1. "Hey Now (Think I Got a Feeling)" (Phillip George remix edit)
2. "Hey Now (Think I Got a Feeling)" (Daybreakers remix edit)
3. "Hey Now (Think I Got a Feeling)" (Nimmo remix edit)
4. "Hey Now (Think I Got a Feeling)" (Phillip George remix)
5. "Hey Now (Think I Got a Feeling)" (Daybreakers remix)
6. "Hey Now (Think I Got a Feeling)" (Nimmo remix)

== Charts ==
Chart performance for "Hey Now (Think I Got a Feeling)"
Chart (2020)	Peak position
UK Singles Downloads (Official Charts)	89
UK Singles Sales (OCC)	89
