= Loveboat (album) =

Studio album by Erasure
- Released: 23 October 2000
- Recorded: 1999–2000
- Studio: 37B – Chertsey, Surrey; Son Ripoll – Mallorca
- Genre: Synth-pop
- Length: 44:54
- Label: Mute
- Producer: Erasure; Flood

Erasure chronology
Cowboy (1997)	Loveboat (2000)	Other People's Songs (2003)

Singles from Loveboat
- 1. "Freedom" Released: 9 October 2000; 2. "Moon & the Sky" Released: 10 December 2001

Loveboat is the ninth full-length studio album by English synth-pop duo Erasure. Released in the UK by Mute Records in 2000, it was produced by Erasure and Flood. It proved to be their least successful in terms of sales and charts since their debut Wonderland in 1986.

Erasure's US record label at the time, Maverick Records, shelved the album because of "lack of hit singles". Largely panned by Erasure fans upon its release (and even by Andy Bell years after) because of its greater use of acoustic guitars, its lo-fi feel and heavy-handed bass sounds (many blame Flood's production work), the album did manage to get some positive reviews from music critics.

Loveboat failed to hit the Top 40 in the UK and two singles were released, although only one was eligible to chart. Maverick Records requested the re-recording and remixing of several tracks from the album before they would agree to release it. Although "Moon & the Sky" was reworked, Maverick never released it and dropped Erasure from its artist roster. Three years after the album's UK release, Mute Records secured rights to finally release it in its original form in the US in 2003, after the release of Erasure's follow-up album Other People's Songs. Loveboat failed to chart on the Billboard 200.

The album's third single (along with "Freedom" and "Moon & the Sky") was supposed to be the fifth track, "Alien". It was talked about in several interviews at the time, and according to an interview there was even a music video made for the song where Andy and Vince are dressed in their clothes from the video for their 1986 single, "Sometimes".

The CG model and cover artwork rendering was produced by Martin Gardiner.

== Background ==
Bell and Clarke wrote most of the songs that were recorded for Loveboat in 1998 with the exception of the lyrics. Although the duo began recording the new material in 1998, they decided to take a break from Erasure the following year and did not continue the recording sessions until 2000. While Flood, who had produced the first two Erasure albums in the 1980s, received credit as a co-producer, Loveboat was largely produced by Erasure themselves. A lot of the recording of the backing tracks and vocals was carried out with the assistance of Ebby Acquah.

The duo opted to bring in Flood for the mixing of the album as they wanted someone who could "manipulat[e] the recordings" and "roughen [them] up a bit". The album's sound significantly changed during the mixing process, which was carried out by Flood and Rob Kirwan. Clarke told them he wanted the album to have a similar sound to Mercury Rev's 1992 album Deserter's Songs. According to Clarke, Kirwan "really [went] for it, hell-for-leather" with the mixing. In a 2000 interview with the Erasure Information Service, Clarke said: "We had all of the songs recorded, then I'd leave Flood and Rob in the studio for a day and they would muck around with it, adding effects and changing things around." Clarke was also directly involved in the mixing process. He gave feedback on Flood and Kirwan's work, and he and Flood also used vocoders to "get a few different textures" out of Bell's vocals. Bell described the finished album as a "very different from the version that we had [before]" and added that the original was "much more acoustic".

In response to the observation that the album was less upbeat than a lot of their previous work, Bell told the Express & Star: "The reason we sound more melancholy is that we are less gung ho and less ambitious about getting into the charts – we are just more relaxed."

== Critical reception ==
Professional ratings
Review scores
Source	Rating
AllMusic	4/5 stars
Birmingham Post	3/5 stars
Entertainment.ie	3/5 stars
PopMatters	mixed
Release Music Magazine	6/10 stars
The Scotsman	2/5 stars

Upon its release, Entertainment.ie considered Loveboat to be "full of soulful, polished electronic soundscapes which can stand alongside their best work". The reviewer added: "Profound they're not – but there's a romanticism and conviction about these lush, string-laden songs that prevents them from descending into Eurovision dross." Karen Pagett of the Birmingham Post remarked that it "sounds as though Erasure [have] happened upon a cache of their weaker, more pedestrian tracks that were not quite good enough to release in 1988". She described the album as a "pleasant listen overall" with its "crisp" production, "clever synth layers" and Bell singing "with such feeling", but she added that "strong melody is in short supply" and there were the "cheesiest of clichés" in the lyrics. Fiona Shepherd of The Scotsman called it a "monotonous trawl through mid-paced electro pop territory that Moloko wouldn't wipe their feet on" and a "morose meditation on the downside of love". In the US, Aaron Badgley of AllMusic described the album as "strong melodic pop music full of angst and pain" and a "classic sounding Erasure album".

== Track listing ==
All tracks are written by Andy Bell & Vince Clarke.

No.	Title	Length
1.	"Freedom"	3:09
2.	"Where in the World"	3:46
3.	"Crying in the Rain"	3:46
4.	"Perchance to Dream"	4:35
5.	"Alien"	4:32
6.	"Mad as We Are"	3:50
7.	"Here in My Heart"	3:43
8.	"Love Is the Rage"	4:09
9.	"Catch 22"	3:38
10.	"Moon & the Sky"	4:22
11.	"Surreal"	5:09
Total length:		44:54

== Release history ==
Country	Date
United Kingdom	23 October 2000
United States	17 June 2003

== 2016 "Erasure 30" 30th anniversary BMG reissue LP ==
Subsequent to their acquisition of Erasure's back catalog, and in anticipation of the band's 30th anniversary, BMG commissioned reissues of all previously released UK editions of Erasure albums up to and including 2007's Light at the End of the World. All titles were pressed and distributed by Play It Again Sam on 180-gram vinyl and shrinkwrapped with a custom anniversary sticker.

== Production ==
- Erasure – production
- Flood – production
- Ebby Acquah – recording, mixing assistance
- Son Ripoll – recording
- Ben Hiller – additional engineering
- Rob Kirwan – mixing
- Kieran Lynch – mixing assistance
- Ray Staff – mastering
- Intro – design
- Martin Gardiner – computer graphics

== Charts ==
Chart performance for Loveboat
Chart (2000)	Peak position
German Albums (Offizielle Top 100)	48
Scottish Albums (OCC)	50
Swedish Albums (Sverigetopplistan)	57
UK Albums (OCC)	45
UK Independent Albums (OCC)	5
