= Cowboy (album) =

Studio album by Erasure
- Released: 31 March 1997
- Recorded: 1996
- Studios: The Church (London): Strongroom (London); Es Teix (Mallorca); 37B (Chertsey, England)
- Genre: Synth-pop
- Length: 49:20
- Label: Mute
- Producers: Neil McLellan; Gareth Jones

Erasure chronology
Erasure (1995)	Cowboy (1997)	Loveboat (2000)

Singles from Cowboy
- 1. "In My Arms" Released: 6 January 1997; 2. "Don't Say Your Love Is Killing Me" Released: 24 February 1997; 3. "Rain" Released: 24 November 1997

Professional ratings
Review scores
Source	Rating
AllMusic	2.5/5 stars
The Guardian	2/5 stars
Music Week	3/5 stars
NME	3/10
Smash Hits	3/5 stars

Cowboy is the eighth studio album by English synth-pop duo Erasure, released on 31 March 1997 by Mute Records. In the United States, it was released by Madonna's former label Maverick Records. Cowboy was produced by Gareth Jones and Neil McLellan and marked the band's return to more simplistic three-minute synth-pop music.

After disappointing sales and chart placing of their previous studio album, Erasure, Cowboy returned the duo to the top 10 of the UK Albums Chart and it contains three singles (two of which hit the UK top 30). In the US, Cowboy greatly improved Erasure's Billboard 200 peak over their previous album, and first single "In My Arms" gave them another Hot 100 entry. Sales also improved in Germany, where Cowboy peaked at number thirty-four.

The album contains eleven Vince Clarke/Andy Bell originals in its UK version. For its US release, the album artwork was changed slightly, the original version of "In My Arms" was replaced with a slightly different US mix and two bonus tracks were added: a cover version of Blondie's "Rapture" (with Clarke providing the rap); and a version of the Burt Bacharach/Hal David song "Magic Moments" originally recorded by Perry Como that Erasure had contributed to the Lord of Illusions soundtrack.

Erasure embarked on another major tour of the UK and US to promote this album, in their trademark style it contained elaborate stage settings and costumes (including Clarke dressed as a guitar-playing cactus).

== Critical reception ==
Emma Cochrane of Smash Hits noted that, although Erasure were "stuck in the '80s" and provided the "same distinctive sound, mixing ballads and bouncy tunes", the album contained "polished, friendly, likeable, pure pop". Simon Williams wrote in the NME that it was "more insipid humalong than inspired hump-along; obsencely innoffensive fodder".

== Track listing ==
All tracks are written by Andy Bell & Vince Clarke, except where noted.

No.	Title	Length
1.	"Rain"	4:10
2.	"Worlds on Fire"	3:37
3.	"Reach Out"	3:47
4.	"In My Arms"	3:28
5.	"Don't Say Your Love Is Killing Me"	3:46
6.	"Precious"	3:31
7.	"Treasure"	3:04
8.	"Boy"	3:41
9.	"How Can I Say"	3:17
10.	"Save Me Darling"	4:01
11.	"Love Affair"	3:39

US-only bonus tracks
No.	Title	Writer(s)	Length
12.	"Rapture"	Debbie Harry/Chris Stein	6:34
13.	"Magic Moments"	Burt Bacharach/Hal David	2:37
Total length:			49:20

=== 2016 "Erasure 30" 30th anniversary BMG reissue LP ===
Subsequent to their acquisition of Erasure's back catalog, and in anticipation of the band's 30th anniversary, BMG commissioned reissues of all previously released UK editions of Erasure albums up to and including 2007's Light at the End of the World. All titles were pressed and distributed by Play It Again Sam on 180-gram vinyl and shrinkwrapped with a custom anniversary sticker.

== Personnel ==
- Tracy Ackerman – vocals (background)
- Jordan Bailey – vocals (background)
- Andy Bell – lead vocals
- Andy Caine – vocals (background)
- Vince Clarke – multi instruments
- Graham Dominy – assistant engineer
- Larimie Garcia – design
- Luke Gifford – engineer
- George Holt – engineer
- Gareth Jones – producer
- Neil McLellan – producer
- Kevin Reagan – design
- Sam Smith – vocals (background)
- Mark "Spike" Stent – mixing
- Darren Tai – assistant engineer
- Paul Walton – assistant engineer

== Charts ==
Chart performance for Cowboy
Chart (1997)	Peak position
Australian Albums (ARIA)	74
Austrian Albums (Ö3 Austria)	27
Canada Top Albums/CDs (RPM)	69
European Albums (Music & Media)	26
Finnish Albums (Suomen virallinen lista)	40
German Albums (Offizielle Top 100)	34
Greek Albums (IFPI)	17
Scottish Albums (Official Charts)	19
Swedish Albums (Sverigetopplistan)	19
UK Albums (Official Charts)	10
UK Independent Albums (OCC)	1
US Billboard 200	43

== Release history ==
Release history for Cowboy
Region	Date
United Kingdom	31 March 1997
United States	22 April 1997
