= Here I Go Impossible Again =

2005 single by Erasure

Single by Erasure

from the album Nightbird
- A-side: "All This Time Still Falling Out of Love"
- Released: 20 June 2005
- Recorded: 2004
- Length: 3:41
- Label: Mute
- Songwriters: Vince Clarke; Andy Bell
- Producer: Erasure

Erasure singles chronology
"Don't Say You Love Me" (2005)	"Here I Go Impossible Again" / "All This Time Still Falling Out of Love" (2005)	"Boy" (2006)

Licensed audio
- "Here I Go Impossible Again" on YouTube

"Here I Go Impossible Again" is a song written and recorded by English synth-pop duo Erasure. It appears on the band's eleventh studio album Nightbird and Mute Records released this song together with "All This Time Still Falling Out of Love" (also from Nightbird) as a double A-side, the third single release from this album.

Written and produced by Erasure members Vince Clarke and Andy Bell, "Here I Go Impossible Again" features graceful synthesized instrumentation and a smooth vocal delivery from Bell (due to his intricate, multi-layered background parts). "Here I Go Impossible Again" was remixed slightly for its radio mix. As they had done with previous single "Breathe", Erasure provided downloadable software on the compact disc single which allowed buyers to create their own remix of the track.

The double A-sided single peaked at number twenty-five on the UK Singles Chart, becoming Erasure's thirty-first UK Top 40 single.

A cover version of the song was recorded by Australian artist Peter Wilson for his album Pulsation in 2013.

== Track listings ==
CD single 1 (CDMUTE344)

1. "Here I Go Impossible Again" (single mix)
2. "All This Time Still Falling Out of Love" (original mix)

CD single 2 (LCDMUTE344)

1. "All This Time Still Falling Out of Love" (Shanghai Surprize club mix)
2. "Here I Go Impossible Again" (Triggertrax extended remix)
3. "Here I Go Impossible Again" (Meloboy's Nü-German Compu-Soul remix)
4. CD-ROM: "Here I Go Impossible Again" (PC Digimpro remix software)

DVD single (DVDMUTE344)

1. "All This Time Still Falling Out of Love" (album version)
2. "Here I Go Impossible Again" (Pocket Orchestra club mix)
3. Video: "All This Time Still Falling Out of Love" (live in Cologne)

== Charts ==
Chart (2005)	Peak position
Germany (GfK)	69
UK Singles (OCC)	25
