= Freedom (Erasure song) =

2000 song by Erasure

Single by Erasure

from the album Loveboat
- B-side: "Better"
- Released: 9 October 2000
- Genre: Synth-pop
- Length: 3:09; 2:55 (radio edit)
- Label: Mute
- Songwriters: Vince Clarke; Andy Bell
- Producer: Flood

Erasure singles chronology
| "Rain" (1997) | "Freedom" (2000) | "Moon & the Sky" (2001) |

Music video
- "Freedom" on YouTube

"Freedom" is a song by English synth-pop duo Erasure. It was the first single released from Erasure's ninth studio album, Loveboat. The song was written by Vince Clarke and Andy Bell. "Freedom", as well as the entire Loveboat album, was produced by Flood, and this is the first Flood-produced Erasure single since "The Circus" in 1987.

Mute Records released "Freedom" in the United Kingdom. It was not released in the United States due to problems with Erasure's then-record company Maverick (the Loveboat album did not have a US release until 2003). The song peaked at number 27 on the UK Singles Chart. In Germany, it appeared in the chart for one week at number eighty in Germany. In Sweden, it charted for one week, peaking at number 51.

The song started life as a track called "Real Love". Although, the lyrics are in a quite early stage, there are a lot of resemblances to the final version.

== Track listings ==
12" single 1 (12MUTE244)

1. "Freedom" (Quake Vocal Remake)
2. "Freedom" (Untidy Dub)

12" single 2 (L12MUTE244)

1. "Freedom" (MARK's Guitar Vocal)
2. "Freedom" (MARK's Jail Term Dub)

CD single 1 (CDMUTE244)

1. "Freedom"
2. "Better"
3. "Freedom" (Acoustic Version)

CD single 2 (LCDMUTE244)

1. "Freedom" (Motiv8 Radio Mix)
2. "Freedom" (JC's Freedom of Flight Remix)
3. "Freedom" (MARK's Guitar Vocal)

AUSTRALIAN CD maxi-single (MUSH019862)

1. "Freedom" (Motiv8 Radio Mix)
2. "Freedom" (Original Radio Edit)
3. "Freedom" (MARK's Guitar Vocal)
4. "Freedom" (Motiv8 Vocal Liberation Mix)
5. "Freedom" (Untidy Dub)

== Charts ==
| Chart (2000) | Peak position |
|---|---|
| Denmark (Hitlisten) | 13 |
| Germany (GfK) | 80 |
| Scotland Singles (OCC) | 24 |
| Sweden (Sverigetopplistan) | 51 |
| UK Singles (OCC) | 27 |
| UK Indie (OCC) | 6 |
