= Sunday Girl (Erasure song) =

Single by Erasure

from the album Light at the End of the World
- B-side: "Take Me on a Highway"
- Released: 11 June 2007
- Genre: Synth-pop; electronic
- Label: Mute
- Songwriters: Vince Clarke; Andy Bell
- Producer: Gareth Jones

Erasure singles chronology
"I Could Fall in Love with You" (2007)	"Sunday Girl" (2007)	"Storm in a Teacup" (2007)

"Sunday Girl" is a song recorded by English synth-pop duo Erasure. Written by Erasure members Vince Clarke and Andy Bell, it is the opening track on the duo's thirteenth studio album Light at the End of the World. The song was the second UK single released from the album, on 11 June 2007. A North American release followed in July 2007.

"Sunday Girl" is a very uptempo electronic music song which tells the story of someone who has immersed herself in nightlife and while in a nightclub catches the attention of Bell, who offers to dance with her "'til Sunday morning" but warns "don't you mess your life up, Sunday Girl". The introduction is very similar to the bridge of the duo's 1995 single "Fingers & Thumbs (Cold Summer's Day)".

An unofficial music video of the song was featured on Erasure's official website, consisting of backstage scenes and live performances from their Light at the End of the World world tour.

The single became Erasure's thirty-fourth Top 40 single in the UK, but has the distinction of being their lowest charting (and the first to miss the Top 30) since "Oh L'amour", twenty-one years earlier. And as of 2025, it remains their final UK Top 40 hit.

== Track listing ==
=== UK CD single (CDMUTE376) ===
1. "Sunday Girl" (radio mix)
2. "Take Me on a Highway"

=== UK CD maxi single (LCDMUTE376) ===
1. "Sunday Girl" (extended 12" mix)
2. "Sunday Girl" (Riffs & Rays club edit)
3. "Sunday Girl" (Riffs & Rays dub edit)

=== UK 7" vinyl picture disc (MUTE376) ===
1. "Sunday Girl" (radio mix)
2. "Take Me on a Highway"

=== North American CD maxi single ===
1. "Sunday Girl" (radio mix)
2. "Take Me on a Highway"
3. "Sunday Girl" (extended 12" mix)
4. "Sunday Girl" (Riffs & Rays club edit)
5. "Sunday Girl" (Riffs & Rays dub edit)

== Charts ==
Chart (2007)	Peak position
Denmark (Tracklisten)	8
Germany (GfK)	76
UK Singles (OCC)	33
US Dance Singles Sales (Billboard)	1
