= Chorus (Erasure album) =

- CD cover art

Studio album by Erasure
- Released: 14 October 1991
- Recorded: September 1990 – March 1991
- Studios: Chateau du Pape (Hamburg); Polygone (Toulouse)
- Genre: Synth-pop
- Length: 41:29
- Labels: Mute (Germany/UK); Sire/Reprise (US)
- Producer: Martyn Phillips

Erasure chronology
Wild! (1989)	Chorus (1991)	I Say I Say I Say (1994)

Singles from Chorus
- 1. "Chorus" Released: 17 June 1991; 2. "Love to Hate You" Released: 9 September 1991; 3. "Am I Right?" Released: 25 November 1991; 4. "Breath of Life" Released: 16 March 1992

Chorus is the fifth studio album by English synth-pop duo Erasure, released on 14 October 1991 by Mute Records in Germany and the UK and on 15 October 1991 by Sire/Reprise Records in the United States. In 1999, Ned Raggett ranked the album at number 45 in his list of "The Top 136 or So Albums of the Nineties".

== Background ==
Upon its release, Chorus became Erasure's third consecutive number-one album in the UK and gave them four more top twenty hits. In the US, it was Erasure's highest-debuting and highest-peaking album on the Billboard 200 at the time, entering at number 29. It gave Erasure their first Billboard Hot 100 entry since "Stop!" with the title track, which also charted well on the Modern Rock Tracks chart and Billboard's Hot Dance Music/Club Play chart. Chorus also charted well in Germany, where it peaked at number thirteen.

== Production ==
Prior to the album's production, programmer Vince Clarke had noticed technical limitations of the by-then-predominant MIDI sequencing standard. Specifically, triggering multiple notes at once queues them and sends them one at a time, resulting in "MIDI slop". In an effort to eliminate this and give the album a "tighter" feel, he avoided MIDI completely, using primarily analog synthesizers and the Roland MC-4 CV/gate sequencer. Avoiding MIDI had other side effects on the sound of the album, such as the lack of chorded voices (the MC4 can only trigger four notes at a time, lending itself well to playing four monophonic parts) and the absence of digital synthesizers and samplers, due to lack of CV/gate control on available models. Clarke would continue with this production technique for later recordings through the 90s.

== Special editions ==
Chorus was also released as a limited-edition CD in special packaging. Instead of a jewel case, it came in a folding cardboard box. The cover was also different, with the two portraits taken from the side instead of the front, as on the cassette releases. It included the standard lyrics booklet, as well as 8 picture cards with various artwork. The first four are the stock photography from the booklet and have "e" logo backs: family on the beach (later used for the "Love to Hate You" single cover), a business meeting group, three businessmen at a construction site, and a woman and child bicycling. The next four are the portraits from the album cover, one each of Clarke and Bell from the front and side. The backs of these have patient data from Clarke and Bell's MRI scans.

Another special edition was released as a promotional item for the music industry: a hardcover book entitled Chorus Software User Manual with hidden compartments inside which hold a copy of the CD and cassette as well as the same 8 cards as the other special edition.

=== 2016 "Erasure 30" 30th anniversary BMG reissue LP ===
Subsequent to their acquisition of Erasure's back catalog, and in anticipation of the band's 30th anniversary, BMG commissioned reissues of all previously released UK editions of Erasure albums up to and including 2007's Light at the End of the World. All titles were pressed and distributed by Play It Again Sam on 180-gram vinyl and shrinkwrapped with a custom anniversary sticker.

=== 2020 deluxe edition ===
A three-disc deluxe edition of the album was released by BMG on 14 February 2020. This consisted of a remastered version of the original 1991 album (disc 1); a collection of seventeen B-sides, remixes, and rare tracks (disc 2); and live recordings of tracks from Chorus performed at the Manchester Apollo in 1992 as part of their Phantasmagorical Entertainment tour. It was packaged as the "hardcover casebound book edition" and branded as one of BMG’s Art of the Album series.

== Critical reception ==
Professional ratings
Review scores
Source	Rating
AllMusic	3/5 stars
Calgary Herald	C
Entertainment Weekly	C
Melody Maker	(favorable)
NME	8/10
Q	3/5 stars
Smash Hits	5/10 stars

Upon its release, Andrew Smith of Melody Maker praised Erasure as a duo who produce "the purest, most perfect pop imaginable" and have "often suffered from their stunning simplicity being mistaken for naivety". He described Chorus as an album of "sparkling three-minute wonders" and added that "often the [lyrical] imagery is awkward or clumsy, but allied to those famously transcendent melodies, this is all the more charming". He believed it to be an improvement over Wild! (which "contained so much dead wood") and noted it is "timeless as timeless comes", adding that the songs "could be played on balalaikas and they'd still sound bloody marvellous". Barbara Ellen of NME considered Chorus to "further underline" Erasure as "composers par excellence of exquisitely vivid pop tunes". She noted that on the album Clarke has "pruned down their enormous sound", describing it as "at times basic and workmanlike until Bell's filthy, fruity vocals come in and take us off to fantasy land again". She concluded, "Chorus is, in effect, hyper-emotional, subtly camp, dizzyingly-layered quality disco."

== Track listing ==
All tracks are written by Andy Bell & Vince Clarke.

No.	Title	Length
1.	"Chorus"	4:26
2.	"Waiting for the Day"	3:50
3.	"Joan"	3:50
4.	"Breath of Life"	4:07
5.	"Am I Right?"	4:18
6.	"Love to Hate You"	3:56
7.	"Turns the Love to Anger"	3:56
8.	"Siren Song"	4:44
9.	"Perfect Stranger"	4:05
10.	"Home"	4:14
Total length:		41:29

2020 Deluxe Edition CD 2: B-Sides, Remixes & Rarities
No.	Title	Length
1.	"Over the Rainbow"	3:30
2.	"Turns the Love to Anger" (Vince Clarke Remix)	5:40
3.	"Perfect Stranger" (KROQ Mellow Version)	2:25
4.	"Waiting for Sex" (Full Length)	4:07
5.	"Love to Hate You" (Robbie Rivera's Juicy Mix)	5:57
6.	"Twilight"	4:23
7.	"Let It Flow"	4:22
8.	"Chorus (Fishes in the Sea)" (Ben Grosse Remix)	4:37
9.	"Siren Song" (Alternative Lyrics)	4:05
10.	"Breath of Life" (Divine Inspiration Mix)	6:41
11.	"Love to Hate You" (KROQ Blunder Version)	4:14
12.	"La La La"	4:12
13.	"Mirror to Your Soul"	3:56
14.	"Waiting for the Day" (Demo Version)	3:41
15.	"Perfect Stranger" (Acoustic)	2:12
16.	"Am I Right?" (Glen Nicholls Extended 12" Mix)	6:48
17.	"Home" (Minute Taker Remix)	6:22
Total length:		77:12

2020 Deluxe Edition CD 3: Chorus Live at Manchester Apollo, 1992
No.	Title	Length
1.	"Chorus"	4:39
2.	"Waiting for the Day"	3:37
3.	"Joan"	4:02
4.	"Breath of Life"	4:30
5.	"Am I Right?"	5:11
6.	"Love to Hate You"	4:07
7.	"Turns the Love to Anger"	5:29
8.	"Siren Song"	6:17
9.	"Perfect Stranger"	3:20
10.	"Home"	5:00
Total length:		44:12

== Personnel ==
- Andy Bell – vocals
- Vince Clarke – synthesizers, programming
- Dave Bascombe – mixing
- Me Company (Paul White) – design
- Martyn Phillips – producer

== Charts ==
=== Weekly charts ===
Weekly chart performance for Chorus
Chart (1991)	Peak position
Argentine Albums (CAPIF)	3
Australian Albums (ARIA)	93
Austrian Albums (Ö3 Austria)	5
Canada Top Albums/CDs (RPM)	21
European Albums (Music & Media)	9
Finnish Albums (Suomen virallinen lista)	29
German Albums (Offizielle Top 100)	15
Irish Albums (IFPI)	4
Swedish Albums (Sverigetopplistan)	14
Swiss Albums (Schweizer Hitparade)	21
UK Albums (Official Charts)	1
US Billboard 200	29

=== Year-end charts ===
1991 year-end chart performance for Chorus
Chart (1991)	Position
Canada Top Albums/CDs (RPM)	95
UK Albums (OCC)	29

1992 year-end chart performance for Chorus
Chart (1992)	Position
German Albums (Offizielle Top 100)	75

== Certifications ==
Certifications for Chorus
Region	Certification	Certified units/sales
United Kingdom (BPI)	Platinum	300,000^{^}
^{^} Shipments figures based on certification alone.
