= Don't Say You Love Me (Erasure song) =

2005 single by Erasure

Single by Erasure

from the album Nightbird
- B-side: "Lie to Me"
- Released: 21 March 2005
- Recorded: 2004
- Genre: Synth-pop
- Length: 4:01
- Label: Mute
- Songwriters: Vince Clarke; Andy Bell
- Producer: Erasure

Erasure singles chronology
"Breathe" (2005)	"Don't Say You Love Me" (2005)	"Here I Go Impossible Again" / "All This Time Still Falling Out of Love" (2005)

Music video
- "Don't Say You Love Me" on YouTube

"Don't Say You Love Me" is a song written, produced and performed by English synth-pop duo Erasure. The track was released by Mute Records as the second single from the duo's eleventh studio album Nightbird. Although essentially a synth-pop song, "Don't Say You Love Me" had elements of doo-wop and girl group influences in its rhythm and lyrical structure. The song was remixed twice by Jeremy Wheatley when released as a single, one which gave the song a smoother, more electronic music feel (the single mix) and one which was a harsher dance number (the radio mix).

While the prior single "Breathe" and subsequent single "Here I Go Impossible Again" / "All This Time Still Falling Out of Love" both offered downloadable software on their limited edition CD singles for creating remixes of the respective songs, "Don't Say You Love Me" instead offered a separate website with a Macromedia Flash-based remix applet that allows the user to purchase custom remixes as MP3 downloads. As an incentive, each unique combination of the song's tracks can only be purchased once.

"Don't Say You Love Me" became Erasure's twenty-ninth Top 20 single on the UK Singles Chart, peaking at number fifteen. In Germany, the single hit number sixty-nine.

BBC Music critic Zoe Street called the track "an OMD-inspired stomp that's sure to reawaken the world to what made [Erasure] so special in the first place."

== Track listings ==
=== CD single #1 (CDMUTE337) ===
1. "Don't Say You Love Me" (single mix)
2. "Lie to Me"

=== CD single #2 (LCDMUTE337) ===
1. "Don't Say You Love Me" (Mark Moore and Eon vox remix)
2. "Don't Say You Love Me" (ATOC's Rockin' 'n' Ravin' vocal remix)
3. "Breathe" (Pete Heller's Phela club mix)

=== US CD maxi single (9285-2) ===
1. "Don't Say You Love Me" (single mix)
2. "Don't Say You Love Me" (radio mix)
3. "Lie to Me"
4. "Don't Say You Love Me" (Piney Gir mix)
5. "Don't Say You Love Me" (Mark Moore & Eon vox remix)
6. "Don't Say You Love Me" (ATOC's Rock'n'Ravin' vocal remix)
7. Video: "Don't Say You Love Me"

=== DVD single (DVDMUTE337) ===
1. "Don't Say You Love Me" (radio mix)
2. "Don't Say You Love Me" (Piney Gir mix)
3. Video: "Don't Say You Love Me"

== Charts ==
=== Weekly charts ===
Chart (2005)	Peak position
Canada (Nielsen SoundScan)	8
Denmark (Tracklisten)	12
Germany (GfK)	69
UK Singles (Official Charts)	15
US Dance Singles Sales (Billboard)	2

=== Year-end charts ===
Chart (2005)	Position
US Dance Singles Sales (Billboard)	21
