= Day-Glo (Based on a True Story) =

Studio album by Erasure
- Released: 12 August 2022
- Recorded: 2019
- Length: 32:29
- Label: Mute
- Producer: Vince Clarke; Gareth Jones

Erasure chronology
The Neon (2020)	Day-Glo (Based on a True Story) (2022)

Day-Glo (Based on a True Story) is the nineteenth studio album by the English synth-pop duo Erasure, released on 12 August 2022. The album was created by reconstructing tracks from the group's previous album The Neon (2020) and is experimental in nature.

== Background ==
The Neon was recorded during the COVID-19 lockdowns and released in August 2020, placing at number four on the UK Albums Chart on its release, the band's highest placement on the chart since 1994's I Say I Say I Say. Day-Glo (Based on a True Story) was created by Vince Clarke rearranging and remixing recordings of The Neon sessions and sending the instrumental tracks to Andy Bell to add vocals. The album was made in collaboration with producer Gareth Jones.

== Critical reception ==
Professional ratings
Review scores
Source	Rating
Hot Press	8/10
i	3/5 stars
The Irish Times	4/5 stars
The Scotsman	3/5 stars

Retro Pop rated it four stars out of five and wrote "almost four decades into their career they've thrown a curveball and put out an album filled with self-referential gems and, although perhaps not to everyone's taste, it stands out as one of the most intriguing, creative projects in their catalogue."

The Quietus gave it a favourable review and said "The whole album is an admirable exercise in sonic restraint."

Riff Magazine wrote, "Far from queer disco anthems, they're moody '90s B-side remixes, murky Brian Eno tracks or downtempo Saint Etienne non-singles. It's not a turn-off, but it's definitely a vibe. And that vibe is more along the lines of, Shit, what just happened to the world?"

i and The Scotsman both awarded the album three stars out of five.

== Track listing ==
Day-Glo (Based on a True Story) track listing
No.	Title	Length
1.	"Based on a True Story"	3:10
2.	"Bop Beat"	3:10
3.	"Pin-Prick"	3:02
4.	"The Conman"	3:14
5.	"Now"	3:18
6.	"Inside Out"	3:44
7.	"Harbour of My Heart"	3:23
8.	"3 Strikes and You're Out"	3:04
9.	"The Shape of Things"	3:12
10.	"The End"	3:12
Total length:		32:29

== Charts ==
Chart performance for Day-Glo (Based on a True Story)
Chart (2022)	Peak position
German Albums (Offizielle Top 100)	13
Scottish Albums (Official Charts)	4
Swiss Albums (Schweizer Hitparade)	100
UK Albums (Official Charts)	29
UK Independent Albums (Official Charts)	3
