= All This Time Still Falling Out of Love =

Single by Erasure

from the album Nightbird
- A-side: "Here I Go Impossible Again"
- Released: 20 June 2005
- Recorded: 2004
- Genre: Synth-pop
- Length: 4:16
- Label: Mute
- Songwriters: Vince Clarke; Andy Bell
- Producer: Erasure

Erasure singles chronology
"Don't Say You Love Me" (2005)	"Here I Go Impossible Again" / "All This Time Still Falling Out of Love" (2005)	"Boy" (2006)

Music video
- "All This Time Still Falling Out of Love" on YouTube

"All This Time Still Falling Out of Love" is a song by English synth-pop duo Erasure. The track appears on the band's eleventh studio album Nightbird and Mute Records released it together with "Here I Go Impossible Again" (also from Nightbird) as a double A-side, the third single release from this album.

The song was written and produced by Erasure members Vince Clarke and Andy Bell. "All This Time Still Falling Out of Love" is a straight up dance music number displaying Clarke's signature syncopated, analogue synth noises and rhythm patterns. The song's original mix, by Tom Elmhirst, appeared as its single version; on Nightbird, it was the one song not to have been mixed by Elmhirst, instead appearing as a harsher dance remix by Vince Clarke and Mark Saunders, who had mixed much of Erasure's early material. In addition, the DVD single contained a live version.

It was performed frequently during Erasure's 2005 world tour to support Nightbird ("The Erasure Show"). The double A-sided single peaked at number twenty-five on the UK Singles Chart, becoming Erasure's thirty-first UK Top 40 single.

== Track listings ==
=== CD single #1 (CDMUTE344) ===
1. "Here I Go Impossible Again" (single mix)
2. "All This Time Still Falling Out of Love" (original mix)

=== CD single #2 (LCDMUTE344) ===
1. "All This Time Still Falling Out of Love" (Shanghai Surprize club mix)
2. "Here I Go Impossible Again" (Triggertrax extended remix)
3. "Here I Go Impossible Again" (Meloboy's Nü-German Compu-Soul remix)
4. CD-ROM: "Here I Go Impossible Again" (PC Digimpro remix software)

=== DVD single (DVDMUTE344) ===
1. "All This Time Still Falling Out of Love" (album version)
2. "Here I Go Impossible Again" (Pocket Orchestra club mix)
3. Video: "All This Time Still Falling Out of Love" (live in Cologne)

=== Digital downloads ===
- (iMUTE344) "Here I Go Impossible Again" (single mix)
- (iMUTE344) "All This Time Still Falling Out of Love" (original mix)
- (LiMUTE344) "All This Time Still Falling Out of Love" (Shanghai Surprize club mix)
- (LiMUTE344) "Here I Go Impossible Again" (Triggertrax extended remix)
- (LiMUTE344) "Here I Go Impossible Again" (Meloboy's Nü-German Compu-Soul remix)
- (XLiMUTE344) "All This Time Still Falling Out of Love" (album version)
- (XLiMUTE344) "Here I Go Impossible Again" (Pocket Orchestra club mix)
- (XXLiMUTE344) "All This Time Still Falling Out of Love" (Shanghai Surprize radio edit)

== Charts ==
Chart (2005)	Peak position
Germany (GfK)	69
UK Singles (OCC)	25
US Dance Singles Sales (Billboard)	4
