= Nightbird (Erasure album) =

Studio album by Erasure
- Released: 24 January 2005
- Recorded: 2004
- Studios: Union Street (Brooklyn, New York)
- Genre: Synth-pop
- Length: 43:09
- Label: Mute
- Producer: Erasure

Erasure chronology
Other People's Songs (2003)	Nightbird (2005)	Union Street (2006)

Singles from Nightbird
- 1. "Breathe" Released: 3 January 2005; 2. "Don't Say You Love Me" Released: 21 March 2005; 3. "Here I Go Impossible Again" / "All This Time Still Falling Out of Love" Released: 20 June 2005

Professional ratings
Aggregate scores
Source	Rating
Metacritic	53/100
Review scores
Source	Rating
AllMusic	4/5 stars
Billboard	Favourable
The Guardian	2/5 stars
Playlouder	4/5 stars
Rolling Stone	3/5 stars
Slant Magazine	3/5 stars

Nightbird is the eleventh studio album by English synth-pop duo Erasure, released by Mute Records on 24 January 2005 in the United Kingdom and on 25 January 2005 in the United States.

== History ==
Nightbird received mixed reviews and was only a moderate commercial success, charting no higher than number 27 in UK. Despite the mixed critical reception, many longtime fans of the band hailed it as a return to the sound and feel of classic Erasure albums like Wonderland and Chorus. Singer Andy Bell's revelation that he was HIV-positive just prior to the album's release shed new meaning on the songs' introspective and sometimes melancholy lyrics.

The album's first single "Breathe" entered the UK Singles Chart at number four – Erasure's highest peak since "Always" hit number four in 1994. No singles from the album charted on the U.S. "Breathe" became Erasure's second number-one on the Hot Dance Music/Club Play chart – their first being "Victim of Love" in 1987.

A massive concert tour accompanied this album which travelled across Europe and the UK as well as North America. The tour, dubbed The Erasure Show, featured the extravagant set designs and costume changes Erasure is known for. The tour wrapped up in June 2005.

The album graphic artwork was made by the British artist Rob Ryan.

Nightbird was Erasure's first studio album not to be issued on vinyl; none of the three singles were released commercially on vinyl, although promotional remix 12"s exist. A vinyl version was finally released in 2016 for the band's 30th anniversary.

== Critical reception ==
Nightbird was met with "mixed or average" reviews from critics. At Metacritic, which assigns a weighted average rating out of 100 to reviews from mainstream publications, this release received an average score of 53 based on 14 reviews.

In a review for AllMusic, critic reviewer David Jeffries wrote: "Bell's dealings with HIV have obviously influenced Nightbird, but he rarely points right to it, making the album adaptable to any listener's own introspection. Smart, moving, approachable, and well constructed, Nightbird is Erasure's mature masterpiece." Christian Hoard from Rolling Stone explained: "Nightbird is full of elegant dance pop topped by the choirboy-like Bell singing about love, heartache and dreams. One could easily mistake Nightbird for something the duo made in the Eighties." BBC Music critic Zoe Street observed Erasure "at their theatrical best", while giving praise to the "sweetly sexy, upbeat" single "Breathe" and the "OMD-inspired stomp" of follow-up "Don't Say You Love Me".

== Track listing ==
All tracks are written by Andy Bell and Vince Clarke.

Nightbird track listing
No.	Title	Length
1.	"No Doubt"	3:59
2.	"Here I Go Impossible Again"	3:41
3.	"Let's Take One More Rocket to the Moon"	4:45
4.	"Breathe"	3:49
5.	"I'll Be There"	3:20
6.	"Because Our Love Is Real"	3:39
7.	"Don't Say You Love Me"	4:01
8.	"All This Time Still Falling Out of Love"	4:16
9.	"I Broke It All in Two"	3:39
10.	"Sweet Surrender"	3:59
11.	"I Bet You're Mad at Me"	4:01

=== 2016 "Erasure 30" 30th anniversary BMG reissue LP ===
Subsequent to their acquisition of Erasure's back catalog, and in anticipation of the band's 30th anniversary, BMG commissioned reissues of all previously released UK editions of Erasure albums up to and including 2007's Light at the End of the World. All titles were pressed and distributed by Play It Again Sam on 180-gram vinyl and shrinkwrapped with a custom anniversary sticker.

This marked the first release of this album on vinyl.

== Charts ==
=== Weekly charts ===
Weekly chart performance for Nightbird
Chart (2005)	Peak position
Argentine Albums (CAPIF)	18
Czech Albums (ČNS IFPI)	53
Danish Albums (Hitlisten)	25
German Albums (Offizielle Top 100)	22
Scottish Albums (Official Charts)	29
Swedish Albums (Sverigetopplistan)	34
UK Albums (Official Charts)	27
US Billboard 200	154
US Independent Albums (Billboard)	7
US Top Dance Albums (Billboard)	2

=== Year-end charts ===
Year-end chart performance for Nightbird
Chart (2005)	Position
US Top Dance/Electronic Albums (Billboard)	23
