= I Could Fall in Love with You =

Single by Erasure

from the album Light at the End of the World
- B-side: "I Like It"
- Released: 2 April 2007
- Genre: Synth-pop; electronic; pop
- Label: Mute
- Songwriters: Vince Clarke; Andy Bell
- Producer: Gareth Jones

Erasure singles chronology
"Boy" (2006)	"I Could Fall in Love with You" (2007)	"Sunday Girl" (2007)

Music video
- "I Could Fall in Love with You" on YouTube

"I Could Fall in Love with You" is a song recorded by English synth-pop duo Erasure. Written by band members Vince Clarke and Andy Bell, the track is the first single released from Erasure's thirteenth studio album Light at the End of the World. Remixes are provided by Jeremy Wheatley and Lee Monteverde, and a James Aparicio mix is available exclusively in the UK iTunes Store. The single contains a non-album B-side titled "I Like It". "I Could Fall in Love with You" was released by Mute Records in the UK on 2 April 2007 and in North America the following day. It was the first Erasure single to be commercially released on 7" vinyl since "Run to the Sun" 13 years previously.

== Background ==
Erasure member Vince Clarke described the origins of "I Could Fall in Love with You":

This is one of the few songs that existed in part before the Maine hotel room writing sessions. Before we started this album, I was really keen for it not to be mid-tempo—I'm having a mid-tempo crisis! Our albums seem to have got slower and slower, so I started searching for classic funk or disco bass lines, put some ideas together with chord changes and bass lines underneath, and emailed them to Andy for him to sing over the top. The song, like this album, is quite 'up' and uptempo because we're both in good spaces right now.

== Music videos ==
There are two different music videos for this song.

Erasure's official website initially presented viewers with a "behind the scenes" look at the making of the music video for this song via RealMedia, Windows Media Player and QuickTime. The footage showed Clarke and Bell as cashiers in a shop-like set-up. The scenes were filmed with extras milling about in the foreground and the clips, filmed in front of a greenscreen, implied that special effects would be added in post production.

However, weeks later a call was put out for fans to submit pictures or video footage of themselves and loved ones in scenes depicting love or falling in love. These scenes (also including Clarke and Bell) were then edited together into a montage with a "falling in love" theme. This new version has sprung up on Erasure's YouTube site and also is viewable on Erasure's official website, dubbed the "alternate video". The original version was made available months later on Erasure's website.

== Commercial performance ==
"I Could Fall in Love with You" entered the UK Singles Chart at number 21, becoming Erasure's thirty-third UK Top 40 single. It peaked at number 69 on the German Singles Chart (Erasure's fifth single to peak at this position). The song has entered the US Hot Dance Club Play chart and peaked at number 7.

In the United States, the single was tracked incorrectly by Nielsen SoundScan during it first week of sales. According to Billboard magazine, "Erasure's 'I Could Fall in Love with You' was initially identified as an EP, rather than a single. It should have bowed last week (issue date 21 April) at number one on Hot Dance Singles Sales and number five on Hot Singles Sales." Once adjusted, the track appeared on those charts in the following chart week, at number three and number ten, respectively.

== Track listing ==
=== UK CD single (CDMUTE366) ===
1. "I Could Fall in Love with You" (Jeremy Wheatley radio mix)
2. "I Could Fall in Love with You" (Monteverde radio edit)

=== UK CD maxi single (LCDMUTE366) ===
1. "I Could Fall in Love with You" (Jeremy Wheatley extended 12" mix)
2. "I Like It"
3. "I Could Fall in Love with You" (Monteverde vocal extended remix)

=== 7" vinyl picture disc (MUTE366) ===
1. "I Could Fall in Love with You" (Jeremy Wheatley radio mix)
2. "I Like It"

=== North America CD maxi single (9354-2) ===
1. "I Could Fall in Love with You" (Jeremy Wheatley radio mix)
2. "I Could Fall in Love with You" (Jeremy Wheatley extended 12" mix)
3. "I Could Fall in Love with You" (Monteverde radio edit)
4. "I Could Fall in Love with You" (Monteverde vocal extended mix)
5. "I Could Fall in Love with You" (Monteverde dub 2)
6. "I Could Fall in Love with You" (album version)
7. "I Like It"

== Charts ==
Chart (2007)	Peak position
Denmark (Tracklisten)	4
Finland (Suomen virallinen lista)	11
Germany (GfK)	69
UK Singles (OCC)	21
US Dance Club Songs (Billboard)	7
US Dance Singles Sales (Billboard)	1
