= Nerves of Steel (song) =

2020 single by Erasure

Single by Erasure

from the album The Neon
- B-side: "Remixes"
- Released: 11 August 2020
- Length: 4:13
- Label: Mute
- Songwriters: Andy Bell; Vince Clarke
- Producer: Erasure

Erasure singles chronology
"Hey Now (Think I Got a Feeling)" (2020)	"Nerves of Steel" (2020)	"Fallen Angel" (2020)

Music video
- "Nerves of Steel" on YouTube

"Nerves of Steel" is the second single from the album The Neon by English synth-pop duo Erasure, released on 11 August 2020. The song premiered on BBC Radio 2.

== Background ==
The vocals were done in Atlanta, Georgia, with the final mixing done in London, England.

Andy Bell said: "This is my favorite track from the album, I am truly honored that all our LGBTQIA+ friends were so creative during lockdown and helped us with this joyful video. Thanks for creating such a lovely piece of art!"

== Music video ==
The video features drag queens and LGBTQ+ stars including participants from RuPaul's Drag Race, including Detox, Manila Luzon, Amanda Lepore, Candis Cayne, and a few others. The video was directed by Brad Hammer, and produced and edited by Tyler Stone.

== Reception ==
The track has received generally positive reviews.

Retro Pop described it as a "synth-driven love song at its core, the track sees Andy Bell pine after a potential lover, over Vince Clarke's trademark pulsing beats."

Stereogum described it as a "patiently pulsing, simmering depiction of that sort of dizzying early love phase."

SLUG Magazine wrote: "Having the distinction of being the most traditional, Erasure-sounding cut, it has all the elements of single status: upbeat but slightly darker synths, intriguing lyrics and a great vocal performance by Bell."

== Track listing ==
Digital download (Remixes)

1. "Nerves of Steel" (7th Heaven remix edit)
2. "Nerves of Steel" (extended version)
3. "Nerves of Steel" (Bright Light Bright Light remix)
4. "Nerves of Steel" (7th Heaven remix)

== Charts ==
Chart performance for "Nerves of Steel"
Chart (2020)	Peak position
UK Singles Downloads (Official Charts)	95
UK Singles Sales (OCC)	98
