= Breath of Life (Erasure song) =

1992 single by Erasure

Single by Erasure

from the album Chorus
- B-side: "Waiting for Sex"; "Carry On Clangers"
- Released: 16 March 1992
- Genre: Techno; hi-NRG; electropop; synth-pop
- Length: 3:56 (single mix); 4:07 (album version)
- Label: Mute
- Songwriters: Vince Clarke; Andy Bell
- Producer: Martyn Phillips

Erasure singles chronology
"Am I Right?" (1991)	"Breath of Life" (1992)	"Take a Chance on Me" (1992)

Music video
- "Breath of Life" on YouTube

"Breath of Life" is a song by English synth-pop duo Erasure, released in March 1992 by Mute Records as the fourth and final single from their fifth studio album Chorus (1991). It was written by Erasure members Vince Clarke and Andy Bell and produced by Martyn Phillips. An uptempo synth-pop song, its dance music elements were strongly accentuated for the club remixes. For the single release, it was remixed slightly, including a shortened intro. In the United States it was the third single released from the album.

The music video makes references to Alice's Adventures in Wonderland and Through the Looking-Glass (Alice moving through a looking-glass, the Queen of Hearts, the Caterpillar, the Mock Turtle, and Oysters from The Walrus and the Carpenter) and contains underwater imagery ("now I'm coming up for air").

== Critical reception ==
Ned Raggett from AllMusic said the song is a "polite declaration of love and passion over a gently soaring dance arrangement—not as full out as other Erasure highlights, but pleasant enough." Larry Flick from Billboard magazine described it as a "pulsating techno/NRG workout" and complimented Bell's voice for being "on target, giving depth to the song's clever wordplay." The Daily Vault's Michael R. Smith noted that "Breath of Life" "has some great percolating synth work by Vince [Clarke], but is typical Erasure fare and nothing really much to write home about." Chris Gerard from Metro Weekly wrote, "Driven by dueling keyboard riffs and a sparse, heavy beat", the song is "exciting electronic pop with brilliant melody and vocal by Andy Bell. The vocal arrangement (especially during the 2nd verse) is chilling."

== Chart performance ==
The track became Erasure's 11th top-10 hit on the UK Singles Chart, peaking at number eight. Their string of top-40 singles in Germany was broken with this release when it peaked at number 44. "Breath of Life" was also a top-10 hit in Finland and Ireland, peaking at numbers nine and eight, respectively. It did not enter the US Billboard Hot 100 but did reach number 29 on the Billboard Maxi-Singles Sales chart. Unlike all of Erasure's prior single releases in the UK, all formats of "Breath of Life" contain only remixes and no new compositions as B-side tracks.

== Track listings ==
- 7-inch and cassette single
1. "Breath of Life" (7-inch mix)
2. "Breath of Life" (Swiss mix)
3. "Breath of Life" (a cappella dub remix)
- 12-inch single

A1. "Breath of Life" (Divine Inspiration mix)
A2. "Breath of Life" (Umbilical mix)
B1. "Breath of Life" (Swiss mix)
B2. "Breath of Life" (Elixir mix)
B3. "Breath of Life" (Stripped mix)

- UK CD single
1. "Breath of Life" (7-inch mix)
2. "Breath of Life" (Divine Inspiration mix)
3. "Breath of Life" (Stripped mix)
4. "Breath of Life" (Swiss mix)
5. "Breath of Life" (a cappella dub mix)
- US maxi-CD single
1. "Breath of Life" (single remix) – 3:53
2. "Breath of Life" (Divine Inspiration mix) – 6:40
3. "Breath of Life" (Swiss mix) – 4:36
4. "Waiting for Sex" (full version) – 4:05
5. "Breath of Life" (Umbilical mix) – 4:28
6. "Breath of Life" (Elixir mix) – 6:26
7. "Breath of Life" (Stripped mix) – 4:36
8. "Carry On Clangers" – 4:01
- US 12-inch single

A1. "Breath of Life" (Divine Inspiration mix) – 6:40
A2. "Breath of Life" (Umbilical mix) – 4:28
A3. "Breath of Life" (Stripped mix) – 4:36
A4. "Breath of Life" (a cappella dub mix) – 4:41
B1. "Breath of Life" (Swiss mix) – 4:32
B2. "Breath of Life" (Elixir mix) – 6:26
B3. "Waiting for Sex" (full version) – 4:05

== Charts ==
Chart (1992)	Peak position
Austria (Ö3 Austria Top 40)	25
Europe (Eurochart Hot 100)	26
Finland (Suomen virallinen lista)	9
Germany (GfK)	44
Ireland (IRMA)	8
UK Singles (OCC)	8
UK Airplay (Music Week)	3
UK Dance (Music Week)	36
UK Indie (Music Week)	1
US Dance Singles Sales (Billboard)	29

== Release history ==
Region	Date	Format(s)	Label(s)	Ref.
United Kingdom	16 March 1992	7-inch vinyl; 12-inch vinyl; CD; cassette	Mute	
Japan	21 April 1992	CD	Mute	
