= In My Arms (Erasure song) =

- UK CD single #1 cover

Single by Erasure

from the album Cowboy
- B-side: "In the Name of the Heart"; "Rapture"
- Released: 6 January 1997
- Recorded: 1996
- Genre: Techno; pop; synth-pop; trip hop
- Length: 3:36
- Label: Mute (UK); Maverick (US)
- Songwriters: Vince Clarke; Andy Bell
- Producers: Gareth Jones; Neil McLellan

Erasure singles chronology
"Rock Me Gently" (1996)	"In My Arms" (1997)	"Don't Say Your Love Is Killing Me" (1997)

Music video
- "In My Arms" on YouTube

"In My Arms" is a synth-pop ballad by English duo Erasure. Written by Vince Clarke and Andy Bell, the song was released in 1997 as the lead single from their album Cowboy. The album version was released as the single version in both the UK and the US, and the lead synthesizer melody performed during the song's middle eight section was mixed lower for the American version. It was issued by Mute Records in the UK and by Maverick Records in the US. The accompanying music video was directed by Dick Carruthers. The cover for the US single release was used as an example in the book The 7 Essentials of Graphic Design by Allison Goodman.

== Critical reception ==
Ned Raggett from AllMusic stated that the song "has an attractive air to it, with a nicely sweeping chorus, but feels a little too relaxed, not as flat out energetic as it could be." Larry Flick from Billboard magazine described it as a "sweet mid-tempo ballad", and noted that Love to Infinity has remixed the tune into "a festive disco anthem that will easily nudge it into the winner's circle of clubland and maybe even pop/crossover radio." He wrote that Andy Bell "is the picture of suave and soulful romance, displaying a mature way with words, while partner Vince Clarke is as shrewd a melody writer as ever."

Ben Marshall from The Guardian complimented it as "pop at its purest", a "techno-ballad" and "great stuff". Chris Gerard from Metro Weekly wrote "With lush keyboards and sublime vocal harmonies, 'In My Arms' is one of Erasure's most beautiful singles." A reviewer from Music Week rated it two out of five, writing, "Rapidly losing their footing in the pop market, Andy and Vince cling to the old formula but, unless this is applied to more immediate pop material, the slide may continue." Kavana, as guest reviewer for Smash Hits, gave a three out of five rating, noting that "they don't seem to be as good as they were when they started". He did, however, call the song "nice and laid-back", with a "good melody that makes it a bit different from their usual disco stompers".

== Chart performance ==
The single peaked at number 13 on the UK Singles Chart and number 76 in Germany — Erasure's lowest-charting single in that country up to that point. In Hungary, it reached number one, and it was a top-10 hit in Finland. In the United States it became Erasure's first Billboard Hot 100 entry since 1994's "Always", peaking at number 55. Its remix was a big hit in dance clubs, peaking at number 2 on the US Hot Dance Music/Club Play chart. The song peaked at number 31, their final entry on both the Hot 100 and the Mainstream Top 40 charts.

== Music video ==
A music video was produced to promote the single, directed by English music video and film director Dick Carruthers, and filmed on-stage and backstage at the New Theatre Oxford (known as the Apollo Theatre at the time). It premiered in the UK in January 1997 and was published on Erasure's official YouTube channel in September 2014.

== Track listings ==
- Cassette single (CMUTE190)
1. "In My Arms"
2. "Rapture" (Chris Stein, Deborah Harry)
- 12" single (12MUTE190)
1. "In My Arms" (Love to Infinity Gyrator Club Mix)
2. "In My Arms" (Love to Infinity Stratomaster Mix)
3. "Rapture"
- CD single #1 (CDMUTE190)
1. "In My Arms" (Single Mix)
2. "In the Name of the Heart"
3. "In My Arms" (Love to Infinity Stratomaster Mix)
4. "In My Arms" (Crumbling Down Mix)
- CD single #2 (LCDMUTE190)
1. "In My Arms" (Love to Infinity Gyrator Club Mix)
2. "Rapture" (Matt Darey Mix)
3. "Rapture"
- US maxi-single (9 43857-2)
1. "In My Arms" (Love to Infinity Stratomaster Mix)
2. "In My Arms" (Love to Infinity Gyrator Dub Mix)
3. "In My Arms" (Love to Infinity Gyrator Club Mix)
4. "In My Arms" (Crumbling Down Mix)
5. "In My Arms" (U.S. version)

== Charts ==
Chart (1997)	Peak position
Austria (Ö3 Austria Top 40)	40
Belgium (Ultratip Bubbling Under Flanders)	10
Canada Top Singles (RPM)	68
Canada Dance/Urban (RPM)	22
Denmark (IFPI Danmark)	7
Europe (Eurochart Hot 100)	53
Finland (Suomen virallinen lista)	10
Germany (Media Control)	76
Hungary (Mahasz)	1
Israel (Israeli Singles Chart)	3
Italy Airplay (Music & Media)	14
Mexico (Notitas Musicales)	3
Poland Airplay (Music & Media)	15
Scotland (OCC)	15
Sweden (Topplistan)	12
UK Singles (OCC)	13
UK Indie (Music Week)	1
US Billboard Hot 100	55
US Dance Club Play (Billboard)	2
US Maxi-Singles Sales (Billboard)	16
