= Neil McLellan =

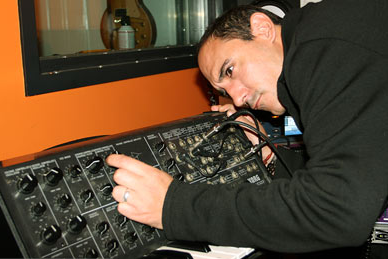
- Neil McLellan tweaking a Korg MS-20

Background information
- Origin: England
- Genres: Electronic
- Occupations: Record producer, songwriter, mix engineer
- Years active: 1990s–present
- Website: neilmclellan.squarespace.com

Neil McLellan is an English record producer, songwriter and mix engineer.

McLellan has worked with XL Recordings, Sony BMG Music Ent., Epic, Sire, Arista, Columbia, Maverick, Virgin, and Island Records to produce a string of No. 1 hits, as well as gold and platinum records. Bands and artists Neil has worked with include the Prodigy, Erasure, Madonna, Archive, Oasis, Nine Inch Nails, Orbital, Eric Kupper, Carl Cox, Sasha, Senser, Telepopmusik, Hinda Hicks, Manu Chao, Brother Brown, Terrorvision, U.N.K.L.E., and Heartless Crew.

McLellan's most popular work began with the UK band the Prodigy, co-producing and mixing Music for the Jilted Generation, and mixing the hit singles "Firestarter" and "Breathe". In 2004, he co-produced the Prodigy album Always Outnumbered, Never Outgunned, co-writing several tracks. He was also a co-producer for their album The Day Is My Enemy.

== Works ==
Year	Artist	Album title	Label	Role	Charting	Sales
1994	The Prodigy	Music for the Jilted Generation	XL Recordings	Producer, mixing-engineer	Heatseekers No. 15; The Billboard 200 No. 198	UK: Platinum; CAN: Gold; POL: Gold, EU: Platinum
1996	Archive	Londinium	Island Recordings	Mixing		
1997	Erasure	Cowboy	Maverick Records	Producer	The Billboard 200 No. 43	
1997	The Prodigy	The Fat of the Land	UK: XL Recordings; U.S.: Maverick Records and Warner Bros. Records	Engineer	Billboard 200 No. 1 Top Canadian Albums No. 1	UK: 3× Platinum; AUS: 2× Platinum; CAN: 2× Platinum; FRA: 2× Gold; SWE: Platinum; US: 2× Platinum; EU: 2× Platinum
1999	Sasha	"Xpander" (single)	Ultra Records	Mixing-engineer		
2004	The Prodigy	Always Outnumbered, Never Outgunned	UK: XL Recordings; U.S.: Mute Records/Maverick Records	Co-producer, engineer, programmer, mixing-engineer, co-writer	The Billboard 200 No. 62; Top Electronic Albums No. 1	UK: Silver
2005	Carl Cox	Second Sign	23rd Century Records	Producer	Dance Music/Club Play Singles No. 1	
2009	The Prodigy	Invaders Must Die	Take Me to the Hospital, distributed by Cooking Vinyl	Mixing-engineer	European Top 100 Albums; The Billboard 200 No. 58; Top Electronic Albums No. 3 Top Independent Albums No. 3	UK: 2× Platinum; AUS: Gold
2015	The Prodigy	The Day Is My Enemy	Take Me to the Hospital, distributed by Cooking Vinyl	Co-producer, engineer, mixing-engineer, co-writer		
