= Breathe (Erasure song) =

2005 single by Erasure

Single by Erasure

from the album Nightbird
- B-side: "Gone Crazy"
- Released: 3 January 2005
- Length: 3:49
- Label: Mute
- Songwriters: Vince Clarke; Andy Bell
- Producer: Erasure

Erasure singles chronology
"Oh L'amour" (August Mix) (2003)	"Breathe" (2005)	"Don't Say You Love Me" (2005)

Music video
- "Breathe" on YouTube

"Breathe" is a song by English synth-pop duo Erasure. It was released by Mute Records in the UK and the US as the first single from the band's 11th studio album, Nightbird (2005). Written and produced by Erasure members Vince Clarke and Andy Bell, the song was remixed slightly for its radio version. The UK CD single includes CD-ROM information that allowed buyers to download the Digipro software package and use isolated musical tracks of "Breathe" to create their own remixes. For a short time, fans were able to upload their finished "Breathe" remixes to Erasure's website to share with others.

"Breathe" is widely regarded as a major return to form by critics and fans alike, who compared the tracks to Erasure's work from the late 1980s and early 1990s. Breathe became their last top 10 hit. In the United States, "Breathe" became Erasure's second chart-topper on the Billboard Dance Club Play chart. In Denmark, the song reached number one, while in Germany, it was Erasure's 20th top-40 single, peaking at number 35.

The music video for the single is based on Hans Christian Andersen's story The Little Match Girl.

== Track listings ==
UK CD1 (CDMute330)

1. "Breathe"
2. "Gone Crazy"

UK CD2 (LCDMute330)

1. "Breathe" (LMC extended club mix)
2. "Breathe" (When Andy Bell Met Manhattan Clique extended remix)
3. "Breathe" (acoustic version)
4. Enhanced section

UK DVD single (DVDMute330)

1. "Breathe" (video)
2. "Breathe" (radio version audio)
3. "Mr. Gribber and His Amazing Cat" (audio)

UK and US digital download

1. "Breathe" (radio version) – 3:54

US CD single (9259-2)

1. "Breathe" (radio version)
2. "Breathe" (album version)
3. "Gone Crazy"
4. "Mr. Gribber and His Amazing Cat"
5. "Breathe" (acoustic version)
6. "Breathe" (Pete Heller's Phela mix)
7. "Breathe" (LMC extended club mix)
8. "Breathe" (When Andy Bell Met Manhattan Clique extended remix)
9. "Breathe" (enhanced CD-ROM video)

== Charts ==
=== Weekly charts ===
Chart (2005)	Peak position
Denmark (Tracklisten)	1
Europe (Eurochart Hot 100)	13
Germany (GfK)	35
Ireland (IRMA)	30
Italy (FIMI)	44
Romania (Romanian Top 100)	43
Scotland Singles (OCC)	7
Sweden (Sverigetopplistan)	33
UK Singles (OCC)	4
US Dance Club Songs (Billboard)	1
US Dance Singles Sales (Billboard)	1

=== Year-end charts ===
Chart (2005)	Position
US Dance Club Play (Billboard)	44
US Dance Singles Sales (Billboard)	15

== Release history ==
Region	Date	Format(s)	Label(s)	Ref.
United Kingdom	3 January 2005	CD	Mute	
United Kingdom	24 January 2005	Digital download	Mute	
United States	24 January 2005	Digital download	Mute	
United States	18 April 2005	Contemporary hit; hot adult contemporary radio	Mute	

== See also ==
- List of Billboard Hot Dance Club Play number ones of 2005
