= Love to Hate You =

1991 single by Erasure

Single by Erasure

from the album Chorus
- B-side: "Vitamin C"; "La La La"
- Released: 9 September 1991
- Genre: Synth-pop; dance-pop; electropop; hi-NRG
- Length: 3:56
- Label: Mute
- Songwriters: Vince Clarke; Andy Bell
- Producer: Martyn Phillips

Erasure singles chronology
"Chorus" (1991)	"Love to Hate You" (1991)	"Am I Right?" (1991)

Music video
- "Love to Hate You" on YouTube

"Love to Hate You" is a song by English synth-pop duo Erasure, released in September 1991 as the second single from their fifth studio album, Chorus (1991). Written by band members Vince Clarke and Andy Bell, it is an electronic dance track inspired by disco music. The synthesizer melody in the chorus is an interpolation of the string break from Gloria Gaynor's "I Will Survive". The duo also recorded a Spanish version of the song, called "Amor y Odio" (Love and Hatred), and one in Italian called "Amo Odiarti".

"Love to Hate You" was released by Mute Records in the United Kingdom and Sire Records in the United States. It peaked at number four on the UK Singles Chart and became a top-10 hit also in Austria, Colombia, Denmark, Ecuador, Finland, Greece, Ireland, Israel, Peru, Sweden and Uruguay. The song's music video was directed by David Mallet and filmed in London's Leadenhall Market.

== Critical reception ==
Larry Flick from Billboard magazine named "Love to Hate You" a "techno-conscious twirler", that nicks an idea or two from Gloria Gaynor's "I Will Survive". He complimented Andy Bell's "sassy and soulful" performance as an interesting contrast to the track's "overall electro tone". Andy Kastanas from The Charlotte Observer declared it as "a much more pop-oriented song, lacking the trademark Erasure synth riff". Bill Wyman from Entertainment Weekly felt that it "has a thumpy bottom and a passable hook". Dave Jennings of Melody Maker considered the song to be "likeable, upbeat, a little bloodless but nevertheless a guaranteed top five entry". He also noted the "mildly interesting lyric". Pan-European magazine Music & Media stated that it's a "top rate pop/dance song, which draws influences from '70s Giorgio Moroder productions. The synthesizer outfit takes us to a lovely Caribbean bridge that will work as well on EHR as in clubland."

A reviewer from Music Week constated that the "instant familiarity" of "Love to Hate You" "is due in no small part to the fact that it seems to be based on several previous hits, most notably Gloria Gaynor's 'I Will Survive', Elton John's 'Nobody Wins' and even Modern Romance's 'Everybody Salsa'. Typically throbbing Hi-NRG, subtle it is not, but a hit it most certainly is." Sherman at the Big Controls, writing for NME, felt it was "totally over the top pop" with a "sickly verse, death defying numbing Brits abroad chorus, wanky 'fake' horns and the worst keyboard sounds Vince could find". Mark Frith from Smash Hits wrote that "it's rather nice to welcome Erasure back. With a tune that's, erm, borrowing bits from certain '70s dance tunes, it's a tale of life's annoying Casanovas, and full of beans it is too."

=== Retrospective response ===
AllMusic editor Ned Raggett described the song as "supersassy". In a 2007 review, the Daily Vault's Michael R. Smith viewed it as "an instant crowd pleaser of sorts", adding that it "comes complete with live audience effects in the background". In 2014, Chris Gerard from Metro Weekly described it as "old-school disco with echoes of 'I Will Survive' in the verse and hints of ABBA as well. It's a killer dance tune, but it's just as good as a pop single. The vocal arrangement is clever, and the crowd noise during the big synth solos add to the excitement." In 2009, Darren Lee from The Quietus noted "the camp melodrama", naming it one of "the most gloriously effervescent pop anthems ever recorded". In a 2020 review, Christopher Smith from Talk About Pop Music described it as "more early-80's style electro pop and yet it felt so fresh in 1991". He added: "This is one of those Erasure songs that you know word for word and are able to quote without fail at any concert where this is played."

== Chart performance ==
"Love to Hate You" is one of Erasure's most successful singles on the UK Singles Chart, peaking at number four. It became a top-10 hit in Greece, where it reached number nine; Finland, where it reached number seven; Austria, where it reached number six; Denmark and Ireland, where it reached number five; and Sweden, where it reached number four. In West Asia, it became a number-one hit in Israel, peaking at the top position for 4 weeks from 15 October 1991. In the US, it reached number 17 on the Billboard Dance Club Play chart, number 10 on the Billboard 12-inch Singles Sales chart, and number six on the Billboard Modern Rock Tracks chart. In South America, "Love to Hate You" was a top-10 hit in Colombia, Ecuador, Peru and Uruguay.

== Music video ==
The accompanying music video for "Love to Hate You" was directed by British director of music videos and concert films David Mallet. It features Erasure performing the song on a futuristic stage with a long, connected runway which extends out into the audience. As Bell dances down the runway, it is revealed that the floor is covered in water. Vince Clarke is also seen playing a circular keyboard similar to one previously used by Jean-Michel Jarre. These shots were filmed after hours in London's Leadenhall Market. Mallet told in 2020, "I saw Vince's character as this mad scientist with lots of tape recorders and all of this bizarre electronic equipment. His character was based on one of my absolute heroes, Joe Meek. 'Love to Hate You' was basically Joe Meek, in his house, making these fantastic recordings of Andy."

== Track listings ==
- UK 7-inch and cassette single; Japanese mini-CD single
1. "Love to Hate You"
2. "Vitamin C"
- UK 12-inch single

A1. "Love to Hate You" (Paul Dakeyne remix)
B1. "Vitamin C"
B2. "La La La"

- UK CD single
1. "Love to Hate You"
2. "Love to Hate You" (Paul Dakeyne remix)
3. "Vitamin C"
4. "La La La"
- US maxi-CD single
1. "Love to Hate You" (album version) – 3:56
2. "Love to Hate You" (Bruce Forest mix) – 7:36
3. "Vitamin C" (Paul Dakeyne mix) – 5:09
4. "Love to Hate You" (Paul Dakeyne mix) – 5:50
5. "Vitamin C" – 3:32
6. "La La La" – 4:10
- US 12-inch single; US and Canadian maxi-cassette single
1. "Love to Hate You" (Bruce Forest mix) – 7:36
2. "Vitamin C" (Paul Dakeyne mix) – 5:09
3. "Love to Hate You" (Paul Dakeyne mix) – 5:50
4. "Vitamin C" – 3:32
5. "La La La" – 4:10

== Charts ==
=== Weekly charts ===
Chart (1991)	Peak position
Austria (Ö3 Austria Top 40)	6
Belgium (Ultratop 50 Flanders)	15
Colombia	7
Denmark (IFPI)	5
Ecuador (UPI)	2
Europe (Eurochart Hot 100)	7
Europe (European Dance Radio)	7
Europe (European Hit Radio)	13
Finland (Suomen virallinen lista)	7
Germany (GfK)	19
Greece (IFPI)	9
Ireland (IRMA)	5
Israel (Israeli Singles Chart)	1
Luxembourg (Radio Luxembourg)	2
Netherlands (Dutch Top 40 Tipparade)	13
Netherlands (Single Top 100)	49
Norway Airplay (VG-lista)	15
Peru (UPI)	4
Sweden (Sverigetopplistan)	4
Switzerland (Schweizer Hitparade)	17
UK Singles (Official Charts)	4
UK Airplay (Music Week)	3
UK Indie (Music Week)	2
Uruguay (UPI)	10
US Alternative Airplay (Billboard)	6
US Dance Club Songs (Billboard)	17
US Dance Singles Sales (Billboard)	10

=== Year-end charts ===
Chart (1991)	Position
Europe (European Hit Radio)	96
Israel (Israeli Singles Chart)	6
Sweden (Topplistan)	25
UK Singles (OCC)	36

Chart (1992)	Position
Sweden (Topplistan)	75

Chart (2024)	Position
Kazakhstan Airplay (TopHit)	134

Chart (2025)	Position
Estonia Airplay (TopHit)	191
Kazakhstan Airplay (TopHit)	179

== Release history ==
Region	Date	Format(s)	Label(s)	Ref.
United Kingdom	9 September 1991	7-inch vinyl; 12-inch vinyl; CD; cassette	Mute	
Japan	21 October 1991	Mini-CD	Alfa	
