= Light at the End of the World =

Studio album by Erasure
- Released: 14 May 2007
- Recorded: 2006–2007
- Genre: Synth-pop
- Length: 39:23
- Label: Mute
- Producer: Gareth Jones

Erasure chronology
Union Street (2006)	Light at the End of the World (2007)	Tomorrow's World (2011)

Singles from Light at the End of the World
- 1. "I Could Fall in Love with You" Released: 2 April 2007; 2. "Sunday Girl" Released: 11 June 2007; 3. "Storm in a Teacup" Released: 24 September 2007

Professional ratings
Aggregate scores
Source	Rating
Metacritic	70/100
Review scores
Source	Rating
Allmusic	4/5 stars
Digital Spy	5/5 stars

Light at the End of the World is the thirteenth studio album by English synth-pop duo Erasure, released on 14 May 2007 by Mute Records. The album's release was announced on the band's website on 26 January 2007 in a video message from members Vince Clarke and Andy Bell. It reached the UK top 30 upon its release.

== Background ==
The album was first released in Japan on 14 May 2007, released by Mute Records in the United Kingdom on 21 May 2007 and in North America on the following day, 22 May. The Japanese release included bonus tracks and a music video. The album's first single, "I Could Fall in Love with You", was released in the UK on 2 April 2007, and in North America the following day. "Sunday Girl" is the second single, released in the UK on 11 June 2007 and in North America on 18 July. "Storm in a Teacup" and "Sucker for Love" were slightly remixed and released as promo singles.

"When a Lover Leaves You" was originally intended to be the album's third (and final) single although it was cancelled. Instead there was a remix competition made, where several parts of the song were available to download for fans to make their own remixes, the best remix would appear on their upcoming third single later that year. However, later announcements stated that the winner remix would appear on their new EP, Storm Chaser. The competition was won by Oscar Salguero.

The album touches upon themes of love and the ups and downs of relationships (which are familiar lyrical Erasure territory), while "Storm in a Teacup" references singer Bell's mother's alcoholism.

The album is available as two different editions: a standard 10-track CD album (CDSTUMM285) and a special 12-track deluxe limited edition CD album (LCDSTUMM285). As with its predecessor, 2005's Nightbird, Light at the End of the World was not released on vinyl, although its singles were all given commercial seven-inch releases.

The album was supported by the Light at the End of the World Live tour.

== Track listing ==
All tracks are written by Andy Bell & Vince Clarke.

Standard version (CDSTUMM285)
No.	Title	Length
1.	"Sunday Girl"	4:35
2.	"I Could Fall in Love with You"	4:15
3.	"Sucker for Love"	3:58
4.	"Storm in a Teacup"	4:04
5.	"Fly Away"	3:21
6.	"Golden Heart"	3:12
7.	"How My Eyes Adore You"	3:20
8.	"Darlene"	3:38
9.	"When a Lover Leaves You"	3:51
10.	"Glass Angel"	5:03
Total length:		39:23

Limited edition (LCDSTUMM285) bonus tracks
No.	Title	Length
11.	"Be My Baby"	3:30
12.	"I Don't Know Why"	4:02
Total length:		46:55

Japanese edition (TOCP-66677) bonus tracks
No.	Title	Length
11.	"I Could Fall in Love with You" (Monteverde Extended Mix)	6:26
12.	"I Like It"	4:25
13.	"I Could Fall in Love with You" (music video)	4:05
Total length:		54:01

=== 2016 "Erasure 30" 30th anniversary BMG reissue LP ===
Subsequent to their acquisition of Erasure's back catalog, and in anticipation of the band's 30th anniversary, BMG commissioned reissues of all previously released UK editions of Erasure albums up to and including 2007's Light at the End of the World. All titles were pressed and distributed by Play It Again Sam on 180-gram vinyl and shrinkwrapped with a custom anniversary sticker. This marked the first release of this album on vinyl.

== Charts ==
Chart performance for Light at the End of the World
Chart (2007)	Peak position
Argentine Albums (CAPIF)	17
German Albums (Offizielle Top 100)	42
Scottish Albums (Official Charts)	35
UK Albums (Official Charts)	29
US Billboard 200	127
US Independent Albums (Billboard)	13
US Top Dance Albums (Billboard)	2
