= Total Pop! The First 40 Hits =

Greatest hits album by Erasure
- Released: 23 February 2009
- Recorded: 1985–2009
- Genre: Synth-pop
- Label: Mute
- Producer: Flood; Stephen Hague; Dave Jacob; Erasure; Gareth Jones; Mark Saunders; Martyn Phillipps; David Bascombe

Erasure chronology
Pop! Remixed (2009)	Total Pop! The First 40 Hits (2009)	Erasure.Club (2009)

Total Pop! The First 40 Hits is a greatest hits collection from Erasure, released on 23 February 2009 by Mute Records. The album utilizes a straightforward format: all of Erasure's singles up to that point, sequenced in chronological order. This is a continuation of the format used in Erasure's 1992 hits collection Pop! The First 20 Hits.

The album was released in a variety of formats: a standard 2-CD set containing the 40 hits, a deluxe 3-CD/DVD longbox set containing the 40 hits, along with live performances from 1987 to 2007, and appearances at the BBC from 1986 to 2005. The digital download version of the album contains three additional bonus 'hits'.

Prior to its release, a remix album titled Pop! Remixed was released on 9 February 2009.

A free four-track digital download titled Pop! Treasure, which features previously unreleased material, was made available to those who pre-ordered the box set via the Erasure online shop.

The album entered the UK Albums Chart at number 21 and at number 12 in Argentina. Mute later issued disc two separately as Pop2! The Second 20 Hits.

== Track listing ==
=== Pop! (CD disc 1) ===
No.	Title	Writer(s)	Producer(s)	Length
1.	"Who Needs Love Like That" (from Wonderland)	Vince Clarke	Flood	3:07
2.	"Heavenly Action" (from Wonderland)	Vince Clarke, Andy Bell	Flood	3:21
3.	"Oh L'amour" (from Wonderland)	Vince Clarke, Andy Bell	Flood	3:08
4.	"Sometimes" (from The Circus)	Vince Clarke, Andy Bell	Flood	3:40
5.	"It Doesn't Have to Be" (from The Circus)	Vince Clarke, Andy Bell	Flood	3:47
6.	"Victim of Love" (from The Circus)	Vince Clarke, Andy Bell	Flood	3:38
7.	"The Circus" (from The Circus)	Vince Clarke, Andy Bell	Flood	4:07
8.	"Ship of Fools" (from The Innocents)	Vince Clarke, Andy Bell	Stephen Hague, Dave Jacob	4:04
9.	"Chains of Love" (from The Innocents)	Vince Clarke, Andy Bell	Stephen Hague	3:44
10.	"A Little Respect" (from The Innocents)	Vince Clarke, Andy Bell	Stephen Hague	3:32
11.	"Stop!" (from Crackers International)	Vince Clarke, Andy Bell	Erasure	2:55
12.	"Drama!" (from Wild!)	Vince Clarke, Andy Bell	Gareth Jones, Mark Saunders, Erasure	4:06
13.	"You Surround Me" (from Wild!)	Vince Clarke, Andy Bell	Gareth Jones, Mark Saunders, Erasure	3:59
14.	"Blue Savannah" (from Wild!)	Vince Clarke, Andy Bell	Gareth Jones, Mark Saunders, Erasure	4:20
15.	"Star" (from Wild!)	Vince Clarke, Andy Bell	Gareth Jones, Mark Saunders, Erasure	3:39
16.	"Chorus" (from Chorus)	Vince Clarke, Andy Bell	Martyn Phillips	4:30
17.	"Love to Hate You" (from Chorus)	Vince Clarke, Andy Bell	Martyn Phillips	3:57
18.	"Am I Right?" (from Chorus)	Vince Clarke, Andy Bell	Martyn Phillips	4:18
19.	"Breath of Life" (from Chorus)	Vince Clarke, Andy Bell	Martyn Phillips	3:56
20.	"Take a Chance on Me" (Rap: MC Kinky (from Abba-esque)	Benny Andersson, Björn Ulvaeus	David Bascombe	3:46
21.	"Who Needs Love Like That" (Hamburg mix (from Pop! The First 20 Hits)	Vince Clarke	Flood	3:02

=== Pop2! (CD disc 2) ===
No.	Title	Writer(s)	Producer(s)	Length
1.	"Always" (from I Say I Say I Say)	Vince Clarke, Andy Bell	Martyn Ware	4:02
2.	"Run to the Sun" (from I Say I Say I Say)	Vince Clarke, Andy Bell	Martyn Ware	4:11
3.	"I Love Saturday" (from I Say I Say I Say)	Vince Clarke, Andy Bell	Martyn Ware	4:01
4.	"Stay with Me" (from Erasure)	Vince Clarke, Andy Bell	Thomas Fehlmann, Gareth Jones	4:43
5.	"Fingers & Thumbs (Cold Summer's Day)" (from Erasure)	Vince Clarke, Andy Bell	Thomas Fehlmann, Gareth Jones	4:23
6.	"Rock Me Gently" (from Erasure)	Vince Clarke, Andy Bell	Thomas Fehlmann, Gareth Jones	4:08
7.	"In My Arms" (from Cowboy)	Vince Clarke, Andy Bell	Gareth Jones, Neil McLellan	3:28
8.	"Don't Say Your Love Is Killing Me" (from Cowboy)	Vince Clarke, Andy Bell	Gareth Jones, Neil McLellan	4:18
9.	"Rain" (Al Stone mix (from Cowboy)	Vince Clarke, Andy Bell	Gareth Jones, Neil McLellan	4:09
10.	"Freedom" (from Loveboat)	Vince Clarke, Andy Bell	Erasure, Flood	2:55
11.	"Moon & the Sky" (Jason Creasey's Heaven Scent Radio Re-Work (from Loveboat)	Vince Clarke, Andy Bell	Erasure, Flood	4:16
12.	"Solsbury Hill" (from Other People's Songs)	Peter Gabriel	Erasure, Gareth Jones	4:18
13.	"Make Me Smile (Come Up and See Me)" (from Other People's Songs)	Steve Harley	Erasure, Gareth Jones	3:29
14.	"Breathe" (from Nightbird)	Vince Clarke, Andy Bell	Erasure	3:08
15.	"Don't Say You Love Me" (from Nightbird)	Vince Clarke, Andy Bell	Erasure	3:46
16.	"Here I Go Impossible Again" (from Nightbird)	Vince Clarke, Andy Bell	Erasure	3:30
17.	"I Could Fall in Love with You" (from Light at the End of the World)	Vince Clarke, Andy Bell	Gareth Jones	4:03
18.	"Sunday Girl" (from Light at the End of the World)	Vince Clarke, Andy Bell	Gareth Jones	3:15
19.	"Storm in a Teacup" (from Storm Chaser)	Vince Clarke, Andy Bell	Gareth Jones	3:28
20.	"Always" (2009 mix (Previously unreleased)	Vince Clarke, Andy Bell	Martyn Ware	3:59

=== Erasure Live 1987–2007 (CD disc 3, "deluxe" edition only) ===
all songs written by Clarke/Bell unless otherwise noted.

1. "Spiralling" (The Circus Tour) 1987
2. "The Hardest Part" (The Innocents Tour) 1988
3. "Drama!" (The Wild! Tour) 1989
4. "Knocking on Your Door" (The Wild! Tour) 1989
5. "Push Me Shove Me" (Milton Keynes Bowl) 1990
6. "Voulez-Vous" (Phantasmagorical Tour) 1992, (Benny Andersson, Björn Ulvaeus)
7. "Am I Right?" (Phantasmagorical Tour) 1992
8. "Heart of Stone" (Phantasmagorical Tour) 1992
9. "Who Needs Love Like That" (The Tiny Tour) 1996
10. "Rain" (Cowboy Tour) 1997
11. "Everybody's Got to Learn Sometime" (Sanctuary The EIS Christmas Concert) 2002 (James Warren)
12. "Piano Song" (The Other Tour) 2003
13. "Hideaway" (The Erasure Show) 2005
14. "Breathe" (The Acoustic Tour) 2006
15. "Oh L'Amour" (Light at the End of the World Tour) 2007

=== Erasure at the BBC 1986–2005 (DVD disc 4, "deluxe" edition only) ===
1. "Sometimes" (Top of the Pops) 4 Dec 1986
2. "It Doesn't Have to Be" (The Tom O'Connor Roadshow) 2 Mar 1987
3. "Victim of Love" (Daytime Live) 22 Oct 1987
4. "The Circus" (Daytime Live) 22 Oct 1987
5. "Ship of Fools" (Wogan) 26 Feb 1988
6. "Chains of Love" (Top of the Pops) 16 Jun 1988
7. "A Little Respect" (Going Live!) 15 Oct 1988
8. "Stop!" (Top of the Pops) 15 Dec 1988
9. "Chorus" (Wogan) 28 Jun 1991
10. "Love to Hate You" (Top of the Pops) 3 Oct 1991
11. "Am I Right?" (Top of the Pops) 5 Dec 1991
12. "Breath of Life" (Top of the Pops) 26 Mar 1992
13. "Who Needs Love Like That" (Top of the Pops) 29 Oct 1992
14. "Always" (Top of the Pops) 7 Apr 1994
15. "Run to the Sun" (Top of the Pops) 28 Jul 1994
16. "I Love Saturday" (Smash Hits Poll Winner's Party) 4 Dec 1994
17. "Stay with Me" (Pebble Mill) 30 Nov 1995
18. "Fingers & Thumbs (Cold Summer's Day)" (Pebble Mill) 30 Nov 1995
19. "Don't Say Your Love Is Killing Me" (Top of the Pops) 7 Mar 1997
20. "Solsbury Hill" (Top of the Pops) 17 Jan 2003
21. "Breathe" (Top of the Pops) 14 Jan 2005
22. Top of the Pops 2 Special (Top of the Pops 2) 9 Apr 2003

"Breath of Life"
"Sometimes"
"Love to Hate You"
"You've Lost That Lovin' Feelin'" (Phil Spector, Barry Mann, Cynthia Weil)
"A Little Respect"
"Make Me Smile (Come Up and See Me)" (Steve Harley)

23. "Sometimes" (The Tom O'Connor Roadshow) 2 Mar 1987
24. "How Many Times?" (The Late Show) 18 Oct 1989
25. "Miracle" (Later... with Jools Holland) 21 May 1994
26. "Because You're So Sweet" (Later... with Jools Holland) 21 May 1994

=== Pop2! (digital download only) ===
1. "Oh L'amour" (August Mix)
2. "Boy" (Acoustic)
3. "All This Time Still Falling Out of Love"

=== Pop! Treasure (pre-order of "deluxe" edition only; download) ===
1. "Sugar Hill" (Vox)
2. "Worlds on Fire" (Alternative Vocals)
3. "Chains of Love" (Other People's Songs Version)
4. "Early Bird" (Demo without Cyndi Lauper vocals)

== Charts ==
Chart performance for Total Pop! The First 40 Hits
Chart (2009)	Peak position
Argentine Albums (CAPIF)	12
UK Albums (OCC)	21
