= Live at the Seaside =

Video by Erasure
- Released: 1987
- Recorded: 17 April 1987
- Venue: Brighton Dome (Brighton, England)
- Genre: Synth-pop
- Length: 56 minutes approx
- Label: Mute; Virgin Vision
- Director: Jerry Chater
- Producer: Angus Margerison; Daniel Miller

Erasure chronology
Live at the Seaside (1987)	Innocents (1989)

Live at the Seaside is the first concert video release by English synth-pop duo Erasure, recorded at the Brighton Dome on 17 April 1987 by the BBC as part of the duo's tour of their second studio album The Circus. The video, originally only available on VHS, features 13 tracks from the concert and, amongst tracks from The Circus, includes performances of songs from Erasure's first album Wonderland plus "Gimme! Gimme! Gimme!", the band's first foray into ABBA cover versions.

The opening song "Safety in Numbers" is uniquely credited to this tour, though, in fact, appears uncredited on The Circus and The Two Ring Circus as the latter part of "Spiralling". All subsequent performances and recordings of "Spiralling" omit the "Safety In Numbers" part.

The songs "Victim of Love", "It Doesn't Have to Be", "Who Needs Love Like That", "Oh L'amour" and "Sometimes" are inter-cut with footage from their respective music videos.

European tour and on-the-road footage shot on Video 8 from 1985 to 1986 by Steev Toth is also inter-cut into the songs "Leave Me to Bleed", "If I Could", "Spiralling" and "Oh L'amour".

== Track listing ==
- VHS video: VVD209
1. "Safety in Numbers"
2. "Victim of Love"
3. "It Doesn't Have to Be"
4. "Don't Dance"
5. "Who Needs Love (Like That)"
6. "Leave Me to Bleed"
7. "If I Could"
8. "Oh L'amour"
9. "The Circus"
10. "Say What"
11. "Sometimes"
12. "Spiralling"
13. "Gimme! Gimme! Gimme!"

== Video and DVD re-releases ==
The video was later re-released on the budget 4 Front Video label. The track listing remained the same, but the cover artwork was slightly modified to suit the generic 'gold border' packaging of the 4 Front Video budget range.

In 2011, the concert was again re-released, this time on DVD, as part of the 2011 expanded and remastered The Circus. No significant changes or additions were made.

== Video credits ==
Taken from the Live at the Seaside closing credits.

- Band members: Vince Clarke, Andy Bell
- Backing vocals: Derek Smith, Stephen Myers

=== BBC concert footage ===
- Producer/director: Peter Hamilton
- Assistant producer: Neil Ferris
- Production assistant: Karen Treloar
- Production co-ordinator: Verity White
- Live sound: Andrew Whittle, Colin Callan
- Sound produced by: Peter Dauncey, Daniel Miller
- Sound engineer: Paul Nickson
- Sound assistants: Chris Gibbs, Paul Brogdan
- Lights: Christopher Ward, Richard Hinds, Neil Kirby
- Tour manager: Andrew Mansi
- Transport: Johnney Marr
- Thanks to: BBC No Limits, BBC Transcriptions Unit, Brighton Dome, Tim Parsons, Dan Silver

=== European tour footage 1985–86 ===
- Video 8 material: Steev Toth
- Backing vocals: James Burkmar, Christopher Dee
- Tour manager: Andrew Mansi
- Moral support: Anne Swindell, Paul Hickey
- Special appearance: Grizzley

=== Live at the Seaside ===
- Produced by Medialab Ltd.
- Editing facilities: Carlton Television
- Sound remixed: Paul Kendall at Blackwing Studios
- Director/editor: Jerry Chater
- Executive producers: Angus Margerison, Daniel Miller

== Related releases ==
- The audio recording of the tracks "Don't Dance" and "Leave Me to Bleed" also appear on the CD single of "Victim of Love".
- On the same tour, Erasure's performances at Knopf Halle, Hamburg on 27 and 28 April 1987 were also recorded. Many of these tracks are distributed across "The Circus" single releases, on editions of The Two Ring Circus remix album and in the Erasure singles box set EBX 2.
