= Pop! The First 20 Hits =

Greatest hits album by Erasure
- Released: 16 November 1992
- Recorded: 1985–1992
- Genre: Electropop
- Length: 75:32
- Labels: Mute (UK); Sire/Reprise (US)
- Producers: Flood; Stephen Hague; Dave Jacob; Erasure; Gareth Jones; Mark Saunders; Martyn Phillipps; David Bascombe

Erasure chronology
Abba-esque (1992)	Pop! The First 20 Hits (1992)	I Say I Say I Say (1994)

Singles from Pop! The First 20 Hits
- 1. "Who Needs Love Like That (Hamburg Mix)" Released: 26 October 1992

Professional ratings
Review scores
Source	Rating
AllMusic	4.5/5 stars
Chicago Tribune	2.5/4 stars
Robert Christgau	(dud)
The Encyclopedia of Popular Music	4/5 stars
Melody Maker	favourable
NME	10/10
Spin Alternative Record Guide	9/10

Pop! The First 20 Hits is a greatest hits collection from Erasure, released on 16 November 1992 in Germany and the UK and 24 November 1992 in the United States. The album utilises a straightforward format: all of Erasure's singles up to that point, sequenced in chronological order with the addition of the Hamburg Mix of Erasure's first single, "Who Needs Love Like That".

In the UK, "Who Needs Love Like That" was released as a single in remixed form ("The Hamburg Mix", a reference to Erasure's extensive touring of Hamburg during the band's formative period). This is included as a bonus track on the UK version of the album, although in the US it only appears on the cassette release.

Pop! The First 20 Hits became Erasure's fourth consecutive number-one album in the UK. In Germany the album hit number 12 and in the US it peaked at number 112 on the Billboard 200, where it was certified Gold nearly 10 years later by the RIAA.

A limited-edition double CD was issued in Japan in 1998.

Pop! The First 20 Hits sequels include Pop2! The Second 20 Hits (direct sequel including the subsequent 20 singles sequenced chronologically) released 17 years later, and Total Pop! The First 40 Hits, the ultimate singles compilation as far as 2009.

== Track listing ==
All tracks are written by Clarke/Bell, except as indicated.

No.	Title	Writer(s)	From	Length
1.	"Who Needs Love Like That"	Clarke	Wonderland (1986)	3:06
2.	"Heavenly Action"		Wonderland (1986)	3:20
3.	"Oh L'amour"		Wonderland (1986)	3:07
4.	"Sometimes"		The Circus (1987)	3:39
5.	"It Doesn't Have to Be"		The Circus (1987)	3:46
6.	"Victim of Love"		The Circus (1987)	3:38
7.	"The Circus" (Remix)		The Circus (1987)	4:06
8.	"Ship of Fools"		The Innocents (1988)	4:03
9.	"Chains of Love"		The Innocents (1988)	3:43
10.	"A Little Respect"		The Innocents (1988)	3:31
11.	"Stop!"		Crackers International E.P. (1988)	2:54
12.	"Drama!"		Wild! (1989)	4:05
13.	"You Surround Me"		Wild! (1989)	3:38
14.	"Blue Savannah"		Wild! (1989)	4:19
15.	"Star" (Single Mix)		Wild! (1989)	3:38
16.	"Chorus"		Chorus (1991)	4:29
17.	"Love to Hate You"		Chorus (1991)	3:56
18.	"Am I Right?"		Chorus (1991)	4:17
19.	"Breath of Life" (Single Mix)		Chorus (1991)	3:55
20.	"Take a Chance on Me"	B. Anderson/B. Ulvaeus/MC Kinky	Abba-esque E.P. (1992)	3:45
21.	"Who Needs Love Like That" (Hamburg Mix)	Clarke	Original	3:03

Pop! The First 20 Years Plus disc 2
No.	Title	Length
1.	"I Love Saturday"	4:03
2.	"Run to the Sun"	4:24
3.	"Always"	3:56
4.	"Fingers & Thumbs (Cold Summer's Day)"	6:41
5.	"Stay with Me"	6:48
6.	"Rain"	4:10
7.	"In My Arms"	3:27
8.	"Don't Say Your Love Is Killing Me"	3:46
9.	"First Contact"	6:01

== Charts ==
=== Weekly charts ===
Weekly chart performance for Pop! The First 20 Hits
Chart (1992–1993)	Peak position
Australian Albums (ARIA)	122
Austrian Albums (Ö3 Austria)	4
Canada Top Albums/CDs (RPM)	40
European Albums (Music & Media)	7
Finnish Albums (Suomen virallinen lista)	7
German Albums (Offizielle Top 100)	12
Greek Albums (IFPI)	9
Irish Albums (IFPI)	4
New Zealand Albums (RMNZ)	40
Swedish Albums (Sverigetopplistan)	15
Swiss Albums (Schweizer Hitparade)	18
UK Albums (Official Charts)	1
UK Independent Albums (OCC)	1
US Billboard 200	112
Zimbabwean Albums (ZIMA)	3

=== Year-end charts ===
1992 year-end chart performance for Pop! The First 20 Hits
Chart (1992)	Position
UK Albums (OCC)	11

1993 year-end chart performance for Pop! The First 20 Hits
Chart (1993)	Position
Austrian Albums (Ö3 Austria)	40
UK Albums (OCC)	92

== Certifications ==
Certifications for Pop! The First 20 Hits
Region	Certification	Certified units/sales
Germany (BVMI)	Gold	250,000^{^}
United Kingdom (BPI)	3× Platinum	900,000^{^}
United States (RIAA)	Gold	500,000^{^}
^{^} Shipments figures based on certification alone.
