= Innocents (video) =

Video by Erasure
- Released: 1989
- Recorded: 15 November 1988
- Venue: NEC Arena (Birmingham, England)
- Genre: Synth-pop
- Length: 56 minutes (VHS), 65 minutes (DVD)
- Label: Mute; Virgin Vision
- Director: David Croft

Erasure chronology
Live at the Seaside (1987)	Innocents (1989)	Wild! (1990)

Innocents is the second concert video release by English synth-pop duo Erasure, released in 1989 and recorded at the NEC Arena, Birmingham on 15 November 1988. It was recorded in the latter stages of the band's tour of their third studio album The Innocents. Unlike the studio album, the definite article ("the") is omitted from the video title. Originally only available on VHS, the video features 14 songs recorded at the concert, including performances of tracks from Wonderland, The Circus and the Crackers International EP. Only 4 of the included tracks are songs from The Innocents.

The concert was shot at the Birmingham NEC, parts of which were first broadcast 12 December 1988 as part of a special BBC television documentary.

== Track listing ==
VHS Video: VVD491

1. "Chains of Love"
2. "A Little Respect"
3. "The Circus"
4. "Hardest Part"
5. "Push Me Shove Me"
6. "Spiralling"
7. "Hallowed Ground"
8. "Oh L'amour"
9. "Who Needs Love Like That"
10. "Stop!"
11. "Victim of Love"
12. "Ship of Fools"
13. "Knocking on Your Door"
14. "Sometimes"
- Titles are as found listed on the video packaging: "the" is missing from "The Hardest Part".

== "Missing" tracks ==
The songs "Witch in the Ditch" and the ABBA cover "Gimme! Gimme! Gimme!" were also recorded as part of the set list but were omitted from the video release. The songs are featured on the DVD of the 3-disc 'deluxe' edition of 2009's remastered 21st anniversary edition of The Innocents.

== DVD re-release ==
On 26 October 2009 in the UK (24 November 2009 in the U.S. and 23 October 2009 in Germany), to mark its 21st anniversary, Erasure re-released The Innocents. A 3-disc 'deluxe' edition of this release included the Innocents concert on DVD, along with the above listed missing tracks and the original BBC documentary.
