= The Two Ring Circus =

The Two-Ring Circus

Compilation album (remixes and live recordings) by Erasure
- Released: 7 December 1987
- Recorded: 1985–1987
- Genre: Synth-pop
- Length: 73:37
- Labels: Mute (UK) – LSTUMM35; Sire (US) – 25667
- Producers: Flood; Vince Clarke

Erasure chronology
The Circus (1987)	The Two-Ring Circus (1987)	The Innocents (1988)

Professional ratings
Review scores
Source	Rating
AllMusic	2/5 stars

The Two Ring Circus is a remix album by English synth-pop duo Erasure that served as a companion piece to their second album The Circus. It was released in 1987 on Mute Records in the UK and Sire Records in the US.

== Composition ==
The vinyl version of The Two Ring Circus was released as a double 12-inch album playing at 45 rpm, featuring six previously unreleased remixes and three re-recordings. The CD and cassette editions feature an additional seven live bonus tracks billed as "The Touring Circus".

The first six tracks are all new remixes of songs that had already appeared on their second album The Circus. The next three tracks are re-recordings of two songs from The Circus and one song from the band's debut album Wonderland featuring orchestral arrangements by Andrew Poppy. None of these nine tracks have appeared again on any subsequent Erasure releases or reissues.

The seven "Touring Circus" bonus live tracks on the CD and cassette mainly feature songs from Erasure's first two albums. The last track, a live version of "Gimme! Gimme! Gimme! (A Man After Midnight)" was their first remake of an ABBA song, foreshadowing a concept that would later provide them with a number-one in the UK in 1992 with the Abba-esque EP.

All seven of the CD and cassette live bonus tracks were recorded in Hamburg and were previously featured on the triple 12-inch single release for "The Circus". There was a further live song per 12" not featured on this album. All ten of these live tracks (plus an 11th originally featured on the "Victim of Love" CD single) are featured on disc 2 of the EBX 2 box-set.

The US editions of the CD and cassette also include an additional remix in the form of an edited version of a previously released remix.

== Commercial performance ==
UK chart rules at the time made The Two Ring Circus ineligible to chart. It became their second release to briefly slip into the US Billboard 200 chart, peaking at number 186.

== Track listing ==
=== UK version (L STUMM 35) ===
1. "Sometimes" (Erasure and Flood Mix)
2. "It Doesn't Have to Be" (Mix by Pascal Gabriel)
3. "Victim of Love" (Little Louie Vega Mix)
4. "Leave Me to Bleed" (Vince Clarke and Eric Radcliffe Mix)
5. "Hideaway" (Little Louie Vega Mix)
6. "Don't Dance" (Daniel Miller and Flood Mix)
7. "If I Could" (Orchestral Arr. & Thanks to Andrew Poppy)
8. "Spiralling" (Orchestral Arr. & Thanks to Andrew Poppy)
9. "My Heart... So Blue" (Orchestral Arr. & Thanks to Andrew Poppy)

"The Touring Circus" (Bonus tracks on the cassette (LC STUMM 35) and CD (CDL STUMM 35)

1. "Victim of Love" (live)
2. "The Circus" (live)
3. "Spiralling" (live)
4. "Sometimes" (live)
5. "Oh L'amour" (live)
6. "Who Needs Love (Like That)" (live)
7. "Gimme! Gimme! Gimme!" (live)

=== US Cassette and CD ===
25667-4 / 25667-4

1. "Sometimes" (Erasure and Flood Mix)
2. "It Doesn't Have to Be" (Mix by Pascal Gabriel)
3. "Victim of Love" (Little Louie Vega Mix)
4. "Leave Me to Bleed" (Vince Clarke and Eric Radcliffe Mix)
5. "Hideaway" (Little Louie Vega Mix)
6. "Don't Dance" (Daniel Miller and Flood Mix)
7. "The Circus" (Dave Powell Mix)
8. "If I Could" (Orchestral Arr. & Thanks to Andrew Poppy)
9. "Spiralling" (Orchestral Arr. & Thanks to Andrew Poppy)
10. "My Heart... So Blue" (Orchestral Arr. & Thanks to Andrew Poppy)
11. "Victim of Love" (live)
12. "Spiralling" (live)
13. "Sometimes" (live)
14. "Oh L'amour" (live)
15. "Who Needs Love (Like That)" (live)
16. "Gimme! Gimme! Gimme!" (live)

== Release history ==
Country	Date
United Kingdom	16 November 1987
United States	1 December 1987

== Chart performance ==
Chart (1987)	Peak position
Argentine Albums (CAPIF)	13
U.S. Billboard 200	186
