= EBX (album) =

1999 box set by Erasure

- EBX1 cover

Box set by Erasure
- Released: 13 December 1999 (EBX1 and EBX2); 3 December 2001 (EBX3 and EBX4); 30 November 2018 (EBX6); 12 April 2019 (EBX7); 12 March 2021 (EBX8)
- Recorded: 1985–2005
- Genre: Pop; synth-pop; electronic
- Label: Mute
- Producer: Erasure; David Bascombe; Flood; Stephen Hague; Dave Jacob; Gareth Jones; Martyn Phillips; Mark Saunders

Erasure box set chronology
| EBX (1999) | From Moscow to Mars (2016) |

EBX is a series of box sets released by English synth-pop duo Erasure, collecting material originally released on 12″, cassette, CD, and DVD singles, released in the UK by Mute Records between 1999 and 2021. Seven volumes of EBX have been released. EBX1 and EBX2 were released in 1999, then EBX3 and EBX4 in 2001. EBX5 refers to the retrospective box set From Moscow to Mars, released in 2016. The standard EBX series resumed in 2018 with the release of EBX6, followed by EBX7 in 2019 and EBX8 in 2021.

Each set presents, in chronological order, five of the band's singles. Although cover art was altered (specifically for the sets), the track listings represent all music originally found on the UK versions of their singles, including all remixes and B-sides.

The first four box sets were originally released on CD, and subsequently fell out of print but were released digitally in 2017. Beginning with EBX6, the sets were released only on digital platforms.

== EBX1 ==
=== Disc 1 – "Who Needs Love Like That" ===
1. "Who Needs Love Like That"
2. "Push Me Shove Me"
3. "Who Needs Love Like That" (Legend mix)
4. "Push Me Shove Me" (Extended as Far as Possible mix)
5. "Who Needs Love Like That" (Instrumental Workout mix)
6. "Who Needs Love Like That" (Mexican mix)
7. "Push Me Shove Me" (Tacos mix)

=== Disc 2 – "Heavenly Action" ===
1. "Heavenly Action"
2. "Don't Say No"
3. "Heavenly Action" (remix)
4. "Don't Say No" (remix)
5. "My Heart... So Blue" (Incidental)
6. "Heavenly Action" (Yellow Brick mix)
7. "Don't Say No" (Ruby Red mix)

=== Disc 3 – "Oh L'amour" ===
1. "Oh L'amour"
2. "March on Down the Line"
3. "Oh L'amour" (remix)
4. "March on Down the Line" (remix)
5. "Gimme! Gimme! Gimme!"
6. "Oh L'amour" (PWL Funky Sisters Say 'Ooh La La')
7. "Gimme! Gimme! Gimme!" (remix)

=== Disc 4 – "Sometimes" ===
1. "Sometimes"
2. "Sexuality"
3. "Sometimes" (12" mix)
4. "Sexuality" (12" mix)
5. "Say What" (remix)
6. "Sometimes" (Shiver mix)
7. "Sexuality" (Private mix)
8. "Senseless" (remix)

=== Disc 5 – "It Doesn't Have to Be" ===
1. "It Doesn't Have to Be"
2. "In the Hall of the Mountain King"
3. "It Doesn't Have to Be" (Boop Oopa Doo mix)
4. "Who Needs Love Like That" (Betty Boop mix)
5. "It Doesn't Have to Be" (Cement mix)
6. "Heavenly Action" (Holger Hiller remix)
7. "In the Hall of the Mountain King" (new version)

== EBX2 ==
=== Disc 1 – "Victim of Love" ===
1. "Victim of Love" (remix)
2. "The Soldier's Return"
3. "Victim of Love" (extended mix)
4. "The Soldier's Return" (The Return of the Radical Radcliffe mix)
5. "Victim of Love" (dub mix)
6. "Victim of Love" (Vixen Vitesse mix)
7. "The Soldier's Return" (The Machinery mix)
8. "If I Could" (Japanese mix)
9. "Don't Dance" (live)
10. "Leave Me to Bleed" (live)

=== Disc 2 – "The Circus" ===
1. "The Circus" (remix)
2. "The Circus" (Decay mix)
3. "Safety in Numbers" (live)
4. "Victim of Love" (live)
5. "If I Could" (live)
6. "The Circus" (live)
7. "Spiralling" (live)
8. "It Doesn't Have to Be" (live)
9. "Who Needs Love Like That" (live)
10. "Gimme! Gimme! Gimme!" (live)
11. "Sometimes" (live)
12. "Say What" (live)
13. "Oh L'amour" (live)
14. "The Circus" (Bareback Rider mix)
15. "The Circus" (Gladiator mix)

Live tracks are mixed together in one only "concert sequence", however, the original releases were spread on several sides/records. Also, they are presented in order of release, different from the actual sequence of the show.

=== Disc 3 – "Ship of Fools" ===
1. "Ship of Fools"
2. "When I Needed You"
3. "Ship of Fools" (Shiver Me Timbers mix)
4. "River Deep Mountain High" (Warm Depths mix)
5. "When I Needed You" (Melancholic mix)
6. "Ship of Fools" (R C mix)
7. "River Deep Mountain High" (private dance mix)

=== Disc 4 – "Chains of Love" ===
1. "Chains of Love" (remix)
2. "Don't Suppose"
3. "Chains of Love" (Foghorn mix)
4. "Don't Suppose" (Country Joe mix)
5. "The Good, the Bad and the Ugly"
6. "Chains of Love" (Truly in Love with the Marks Bros. mix)
7. "The Good, the Bad and the Ugly" (The Dangerous mix)

=== Disc 5 – "A Little Respect" ===
1. "A Little Respect"
2. "Like Zsa Zsa Zsa Gabor"
3. "A Little Respect" (extended mix)
4. "Like Zsa Zsa Zsa Gabor" (Mark Freegard mix)
5. "Love Is Colder Than Death"
6. "A Little Respect" (Big Train mix)
7. "Like Zsa Zsa Zsa Gabor" (Rico Conning mix)

== EBX3 ==
=== Disc 1 – Crackers International ===
1. "Stop!" (cold ending) – 3:03
2. "The Hardest Part" – 3:40
3. "Knocking on Your Door" – 2:57
4. "She Won't Be Home" – 3:28
5. "The Hardest Part" (12" version) – 5:06
6. "Knocking on Your Door" (12" version) – 3:59
7. "Stop!" (Mark Saunders remix) – 5:47
8. "Knocking on Your Door" (Mark Saunders remix) – 6:07
9. "God Rest Ye Merry Gentlemen" – 3:10

=== Disc 2 – "Drama!" ===
1. "Drama!"
2. "Sweet, Sweet Baby"
3. "Drama!" (Act 2)
4. "Sweet, Sweet Baby" (The Moo–Moo mix)
5. "Paradise"
6. "Drama!" (Krucial mix)
7. "Sweet, Sweet Baby" (Medi mix)
8. "Paradise" (Lost and Found mix)

=== Disc 3 – "You Surround Me" ===
1. "You Surround Me"
2. "91 Steps"
3. "You Surround Me" (Syrinx mix)
4. "Supernature"
5. "91 Steps" (+24 mix)
6. "You Surround Me" (remix)
7. "Supernature" (William Orbit mix)
8. "91 Steps" (6 pianos mix)
9. "Supernature" (Daniel Miller/Phil Legg mix)
10. "You Surround Me" (Gareth Jones mix)
11. "Supernature" (Mark Saunders mix)

=== Disc 4 – "Blue Savannah" ===
1. "Blue Savannah"
2. "Runaround on the Underground"
3. "Blue Savannah" (remix)
4. "No G.D.M."
5. "Blue Savannah" (Der Deutsche mix II)
6. "No G.D.M." (unfinished mix)
7. "Runaround on the Underground" (remix)
8. "Blue Savannah" (Der Deutsche mix I)

=== Disc 5 – "Star" ===
1. "Star"
2. "Dreamlike State"
3. "Star" (Trafalmadore mix)
4. "Dreamlike State" (The 12 Hour Technicolor mix)
5. "Star" (Interstellar mix)
6. "Star" (Soul mix)
7. "Dreamlike State" (The 24 Hour Technicolor mix)

== EBX4 ==
=== Disc 1 – "Chorus" ===
1. "Chorus"
2. "Over the Rainbow"
3. "Chorus" (Pure Trance mix)
4. "Snappy" (The Spice Has Risen mix)
5. "Chorus" (Transdental Trance mix)
6. "Snappy"
7. "Chorus" (Aggressive Trance mix)

=== Disc 2 – "Love to Hate You" ===
1. "Love to Hate You"
2. "Vitamin C"
3. "Love to Hate You" (remix)
4. "Vitamin C" (remix)
5. "La La La"
6. "Love to Hate You" (Bruce Forest mix)

=== Disc 3 – "Am I Right?" ===
1. "Am I Right?"
2. "Carry on Clangers" (full length)
3. "Let It Flow"
4. "Waiting for Sex" (full length)
5. "Am I Right?" (Dave Bascombe remix)
6. "Am I Right?" (The Grid remix)
7. "Love to Hate You" (LFO Modulated Filter mix)
8. "Chorus" (Vegan mix)
9. "B3"
10. "Perfect Stranger" (acoustic)

=== Disc 4 – "Breath of Life" ===
1. "Breath of Life" (7" mix)
2. "Breath of Life" (Swiss mix)
3. "Breath of Life" (a cappella dub remix)
4. "Breath of Life" (Divine Inspiration mix)
5. "Breath of Life" (Umbilical mix)
6. "Breath of Life" (Elixir mix)
7. "Breath of Life" (Stripped mix)

=== Disc 5 – Abba-esque ===
1. "Lay All Your Love on Me"
2. "S.O.S."
3. "Take a Chance on Me"
4. "Voulez Vous"
5. "Voulez Vous" (Brain Stem Death Test mix)
6. "Lay All Your Love on Me" (No Panties mix)
7. "Take a Chance On Me" (Take a Trance on Me mix)
8. "S.O.S." (Perimeter mix)

== EBX6 ==
The EBX series skipped the number 5, as the catalog number EBX5 had been assigned to the retrospective box set From Moscow to Mars.

Always
| No. | Title | Length |
|---|---|---|
| 1. | "Always" (2009 remastered version) | 4:02 |
| 2. | "Tragic" | 4:21 |
| 3. | "Always" (extended mix) | 6:13 |
| 4. | "Always" (Cappella club remix) | 7:14 |
| 5. | "Always" (Microbots trance dance mix) | 4:36 |
| 6. | "Always" (Microbots Inside Your Brain mix) | 5:03 |
| 7. | "Always" (Hey Mix) | 6:27 |

Run to the Sun
| No. | Title | Length |
|---|---|---|
| 8. | "Run to the Sun" (2009 remastered version) | 4:11 |
| 9. | "Tenderest Moments" | 5:28 |
| 10. | "Run to the Sun" (Beatmasters' Galactic mix) | 7:20 |
| 11. | "Run to the Sun" (Beatmasters' Outergalactic mix) | 5:38 |
| 12. | "Run to the Sun" (The Simon & Diamond Bhangra remix) | 4:27 |
| 13. | "Run to the Sun" (Set the Controls for the Heart of the Sun mix) | 6:21 |
| 14. | "Run to the Sun" (Amber Solaire mix) | 10:12 |
| 15. | "Run to the Sun" (The Diss-cuss mix) | 6:30 |

I Love Saturday
| No. | Title | Length |
|---|---|---|
| 16. | "I Love Saturday" (2009 remastered version) | 4:01 |
| 17. | "I Love Saturday" (JX mix) | 6:57 |
| 18. | "I Love Saturday" (Beatmasters dub mix) | 4:12 |
| 19. | "Dodo" | 3:34 |
| 20. | "I Love Saturday" (Beatmasters club mix) | 6:21 |
| 21. | "I Love Saturday" (Flower mix) | 6:37 |
| 22. | "I Love Saturday" (303 mix) | 7:23 |
| 23. | "Always" (X Dub Cut) | 4:34 |
| 24. | "Ghost" | 6:13 |
| 25. | "Truly, Madly, Deeply" | 4:27 |
| 26. | "Tragic" (Live Vocal) | 4:19 |

Stay with Me
| No. | Title | Length |
|---|---|---|
| 27. | "Stay with Me" (2009 remastered version) | 4:43 |
| 28. | "True Love Wars" | 4:08 |
| 29. | "Stay with Me" (Basic mix) | 7:34 |
| 30. | "True Love Wars" (Omni mix) | 5:26 |
| 31. | "Stay with Me" (Flow mix) | 8:33 |
| 32. | "Stay with Me" (NY mix) | 8:35 |
| 33. | "Stay with Me" (Guitar mix) | 7:18 |
| 34. | "Stay with Me" (Castaway dub) | 4:52 |

Fingers & Thumbs (Cold Summer's Day)
| No. | Title | Length |
|---|---|---|
| 35. | "Fingers and Thumbs" (2009 remastered version) | 4:23 |
| 36. | "Hi NRG" | 5:52 |
| 37. | "Fingers and Thumbs" (Twilight 0.2) | 5:09 |
| 38. | "Fingers and Thumbs" (Figures in Crumbs) | 9:32 |
| 39. | "Fingers and Thumbs" (Tin Tin Out remix) | 8:04 |
| 40. | "Fingers and Thumbs" (Dub on the Moon) | 8:43 |
| 41. | "Fingers and Thumbs" (Electrofinger mix) | 6:57 |
| 42. | "Fingers and Thumbs" (Twilight Plus) | 7:53 |
| 43. | "Fingers and Thumbs" (Tin Tin Out instrumental) | 8:03 |

== EBX7 ==
In My Arms
| No. | Title | Length |
|---|---|---|
| 1. | "In My Arms" | 3:27 |
| 2. | "In the Name of the Heart" | 3:51 |
| 3. | "In My Arms" (Love to Infinity Stratomaster mix) | 6:44 |
| 4. | "In My Arms" (Crumbling Down mix) | 7:43 |
| 5. | "In My Arms" (Love to Infinity club mix) | 9:13 |
| 6. | "Rapture" (Matt Darey mix) | 8:05 |
| 7. | "Rapture" | 5:15 |

Don't Say Your Love Is Killing Me
| No. | Title | Length |
|---|---|---|
| 8. | "Don't Say Your Love Is Killing Me" | 3:47 |
| 9. | "Heart of Glass" (Live in Oxford) | 4:59 |
| 10. | "Don't Say Your Love Is Killing Me" (Jon Pleased Wimmin') | 6:44 |
| 11. | "Don't Say Your Love Is Killing Me" (Tall Paul mix) | 7:46 |
| 12. | "Don't Say Your Love Is Killing Me" (Jon Pleased Wimmin Flashback dub) | 6:52 |
| 13. | "Oh L'amour" (Matt Darey mix) | 8:54 |
| 14. | "Oh L'amour" (Tin Tin Out mix) | 7:44 |

Rain
| No. | Title | Length |
|---|---|---|
| 15. | "Rain" (Al Stone mix) | 4:08 |
| 16. | "In My Arms" (BBE remix) | 4:18 |
| 17. | "First Contact" (Vocal Mix) | 6:05 |
| 18. | "Rain" (Live in San Francisco) | 5:27 |
| 19. | "Sometimes" (Live in Oxford) | 3:30 |
| 20. | "Love to Hate You" (Live in Oxford) | 4:08 |
| 21. | "Rain" (Jon Pleased Wimmin Vocal Mix) | 6:54 |
| 22. | "Sometimes" (John "00" Fleming's full vocal club mix) | 7:04 |
| 23. | "In My Arms" (Dekkard Vocal) | 8:53 |
| 24. | "Rain" (Blue Amazon Twisted Circles mix) | 12:50 |
| 25. | "First Contact" (Instrumental) | 6:05 |
| 26. | "In My Arms" (Dekkard Dub) | 7:29 |
| 27. | "Sometimes" (John "00" Fleming's Give It Some Welly Dub Mix) | 7:03 |
| 28. | "Rain" (Jon Pleased Wimmin Vocal Dub) | 8:40 |

Freedom
| No. | Title | Length |
|---|---|---|
| 29. | "Freedom" | 2:53 |
| 30. | "Better" | 3:45 |
| 31. | "Freedom" (Acoustic Single Version) | 3:15 |
| 32. | "Freedom" (Motiv 8 Radio Mix) | 3:41 |
| 33. | "Freedom" (JC's Freedom of Flight Remix) | 5:48 |
| 34. | "Freedom" (MARK's Guitar Vocal) | 9:10 |
| 35. | "Freedom" (MARK's Jail Term Dub) | 9:42 |
| 36. | "Freedom" (Quake Vocal Remake) | 8:45 |
| 37. | "Freedom" (Untidy Dub) | 8:19 |

Moon and the Sky
| No. | Title | Length |
|---|---|---|
| 38. | "Moon and the Sky" (JC's Heaven Scent Radio Re-Work – 2009 Remastered Version) | 4:16 |
| 39. | "Moon and the Sky" (The Millionaires Radio Edit) | 3:32 |
| 40. | "Moon and the Sky" (Randy Roger's Ramjet Mix) | 6:25 |
| 41. | "Moon and the Sky" (Sleaze Sisters Anthem Mix) | 7:45 |
| 42. | "Moon and the Sky" (BK Mix) | 7:54 |
| 43. | "Moon and the Sky" (Murk Monster Mix) | 9:20 |
| 44. | "Perchance to Dream" (Jason Jinx Remix) | 8:34 |
| 45. | "Baby Love" (Acoustic Version) | 2:41 |
| 46. | "Freedom" (Acoustic Version) | 2:28 |
| 47. | "Alien" (Acoustic Version) | 4:12 |
| 48. | "Where in the World" (Acoustic Version) | 3:38 |
| 49. | "A Little Respect" (Acoustic Version) | 3:13 |

== EBX8 ==
Solsbury Hill
| No. | Title | Length |
|---|---|---|
| 1. | "Solsbury Hill" (2009 Remastered Version) | 4:19 |
| 2. | "Tell It to Me" | 4:17 |
| 3. | "Searching" | 4:15 |
| 4. | "Solsbury Hill" (37B Mix) | 5:00 |
| 5. | "Solsbury Hill" (Manhattan Clique Extended Remix) | 7:22 |
| 6. | "Ave Maria" | 2:52 |
| 7. | "Video Killed the Radio Star" (37B Mix) | 3:52 |

Make Me Smile (Come Up and See Me)
| No. | Title | Length |
|---|---|---|
| 8. | "Make Me Smile" (2009 Remastered Version) | 3:29 |
| 9. | "Oh L'amour" (Acoustic) | 3:31 |
| 10. | "Walking in the Rain" (37B Mix) | 2:49 |
| 11. | "Make Me Smile" (Dan Frampton Radio Mix) | 3:34 |
| 12. | "Make Me Smile" (Manhattan Clique Extended Remix) | 7:34 |
| 13. | "When Will I See You Again" (37B Mix) | 2:27 |
| 14. | "Can't Help Falling In Love" (Acoustic) | 3:16 |

Breathe
| No. | Title | Length |
|---|---|---|
| 15. | "Breathe" (2009 Remastered Version) | 3:50 |
| 16. | "Gone Crazy" | 3:25 |
| 17. | "Breathe" (LMC Extended Club Mix) | 6:11 |
| 18. | "Breathe" (When Andy Bell Met Manhattan Clique Extended Remix) | 7:19 |
| 19. | "Breathe" (Acoustic Version) | 3:58 |
| 20. | "Mr Gribber and His Amazing Cat" | 2:46 |

Don't Say You Love Me
| No. | Title | Length |
|---|---|---|
| 21. | "Don't Say You Love Me" (2009 Remastered Version) | 3:46 |
| 22. | "Lie to Me" | 2:58 |
| 23. | "Don't Say You Love Me" (Mark Moore & Eon Vox Remix) | 5:39 |
| 24. | "Don't Say You Love Me" (ATOC's Rock 'n' Ravin' Vocal Remix) | 7:05 |
| 25. | "Breathe" (Pete Heller's Phela Club Mix) | 7:13 |
| 26. | "Don't Say You Love Me" (Piney Gir Remix) | 4:31 |

Here I Go Impossible Again / All This Time Still Falling Out of Love
| No. | Title | Length |
|---|---|---|
| 27. | "Here I Go Impossible Again" (Single Mix) | 3:32 |
| 28. | "All This Time Still Falling Out of Love" (2009 Remastered Version) | 3:33 |
| 29. | "All This Time Still Falling Out of Love" (Shanghai Surprise Club Mix) | 7:39 |
| 30. | "Here I Go Impossible Again" (Triggertrax Extended Remix) | 5:19 |
| 31. | "Here I Go Impossible Again" (Meloboy's Nü-German Compu-Soul Remix) | 3:37 |
| 32. | "Here I Go Impossible Again" (Pocket Orchestra Club Mix) | 5:12 |
