= Hits! The Very Best of Erasure =

Compilation album by Erasure

Greatest hits album by Erasure
- Released: 20 October 2003
- Recorded: 1985–2003
- Genre: Synth-pop
- Length: 78:24
- Label: Mute

Erasure chronology
Other People's Songs (2003)	Hits! The Very Best of Erasure (2003)	Nightbird (2005)

Singles from Hits! The Very Best of Erasure
- 1. "Oh L'amour (August Mix)" Released: 13 October 2003

Professional ratings
Review scores
Source	Rating
AllMusic	4.5/5 stars

Hits! The Very Best of Erasure is the second greatest hits album by English synth-pop duo Erasure, released on 20 October 2003 by Mute Records. Capitalising on a resurgence of Erasure's music after their successful covers album Other People's Songs, Mute released Hits! in order to reintroduce people to the duo's music and to give an update to their 1992 singles compilation Pop! The First 20 Hits. A DVD of music videos, Hits! The Videos, was also released at the same time.

Since the release of Pop!, Erasure had released fifteen more singles, but only six of them appeared on Hits!. In addition, two additional songs from the Abba-esque EP were added to the line-up, as well as a new remix of "Oh L'amour", originally found on their 1986 debut album Wonderland.

To entice Erasure completists to purchase the Hits! set, limited copies of the album contained a bonus CD containing an "Erasure Megamix", consisting of eighteen of their classic songs (including "You Surround Me", the only song not on the main album) strung together in a DJ-mixed form. A few are the basic single mixes, but most of them consist of well known dance remixes done at the time of their respective releases; in particular, additional vocals from remixes of "Love to Hate You" and "Sometimes" were included.

Hits! was repackaged and reissued in the UK on 29 October 2007. This new version includes the same two discs as the original release, along with the Hits! The Videos DVD. On 22 July 2013, the album was certified platinum by the British Phonographic Industry (BPI).

== Track listing ==
=== Disc one ===
1. "Oh L'amour" (Clarke/Bell)
2. "Sometimes" (Clarke/Bell)
3. "Victim of Love" (Clarke/Bell)
4. "Ship of Fools" (Clarke/Bell)
5. "Chains of Love" (Clarke/Bell)
6. "A Little Respect" (Clarke/Bell)
7. "Stop!" (Clarke/Bell)
8. "Blue Savannah" (Clarke/Bell)
9. "Chorus" (Clarke/Bell)
10. "Love to Hate You" (Clarke/Bell)
11. "Breath of Life" (Clarke/Bell)
12. "Lay All Your Love on Me" (Andersson/Ulvaeus)
13. "Take a Chance on Me" (Andersson/Ulvaeus)
14. "Voulez-Vous" (Andersson/Ulvaeus)
15. "Always" (Clarke/Bell)
16. "Stay with Me" (Clarke/Bell)
17. "In My Arms" (Clarke/Bell)
18. "Freedom" (Clarke/Bell)
19. "Solsbury Hill" (Peter Gabriel)
20. "Oh L'amour (August Mix)" (Clarke/Bell)

=== Disc two – "Erasure Megamix" ===
Remixed and reconstructed by: Mark Towns, Chicago 2003

1. "Stay with Me" (Clarke/Bell)
2. "You Surround Me" (Clarke/Bell)
3. "In My Arms" (Clarke/Bell)
4. "Solsbury Hill" (Gabriel)
5. "A Little Respect" (Clarke/Bell)
6. "Chains of Love" (Clarke/Bell)
7. "Take a Chance on Me" (Andersson/Ulvaeus)
8. "Love to Hate You" (Clarke/Bell)
9. "Stop!" (Clarke/Bell)
10. "Victim of Love" (Clarke/Bell)
11. "Blue Savannah" (Clarke/Bell)
12. "Always" (Clarke/Bell)
13. "Freedom" (Clarke/Bell)
14. "Chorus" (Clarke/Bell)
15. "Oh L'amour" (Clarke/Bell)
16. "Breath of Life" (Clarke/Bell)
17. "Sometimes" (Clarke/Bell)
18. "Ship of Fools" (Clarke/Bell)

== Charts ==
Chart performance for Hits! The Very Best of Erasure
Chart (2003)	Peak position
Czech Albums (ČNS IFPI)	50
German Albums (Offizielle Top 100)	54
Scottish Albums (Official Charts)	14
UK Albums (Official Charts)	15
US Top Dance Albums (Billboard)	2

== Certifications ==
Certifications for Hits! The Very Best of Erasure
Region	Certification	Certified units/sales
United Kingdom (BPI)	Platinum	300,000^{^}
^{^} Shipments figures based on certification alone.

== 10 Great Songs ==
10 Great Songs

Greatest hits album by Erasure
- Released: 2 October 2009
- Recorded: 1986–1994
- Genre: Synth-pop
- Label: Mute

Erasure chronology
Pop2! The Second 20 Hits (2009)	10 Great Songs (2009)	Tomorrow's World (2011)

10 Great Songs is a budget compilation released on 2 November 2009, shortly after the Total Pop! The First 40 Hits range of releases. According to the official Erasure website, the album was "part of a series of budget titles put together by EMI specifically for sale through 'non-traditional outlets'". It re-used the cover artwork from the Hits! The Very Best of Erasure compilation, bordered by a generic sleeve design used on the packaging for other artists also featured in the series.

=== Track listing ===
1. "Sometimes"
2. "Victim of Love"
3. "Ship of Fools"
4. "Stop!"
5. "Blue Savannah"
6. "Chorus"
7. "Breath of Life"
8. "Take a Chance on Me"
9. "Love to Hate You"
10. "Always"
