= Hits! The Videos =

Video by Erasure
- Released: 2003
- Recorded: 1985–2003
- Genre: Synth-pop
- Label: Mute

Erasure chronology
Sanctuary – The EIS Christmas Concert 2002 (2003)	Hits! The Videos (2003)	The Tank, the Swan & the Balloon (2004)

Hits! The Videos is a DVD released by English synth-pop duo Erasure as a companion to their greatest hits album Hits! The Very Best of Erasure. The double-disc set was released by Mute Records in 2003 and contained all music video clips from the band from their inception in 1985 up to 2003. Also included are several live and television performances, alternate videos and promotional documentaries and interviews with Vince Clarke and Andy Bell during the course of their career.

== Track listing and production notes ==
=== Disc one ===
1. "Who Needs Love Like That"
  Directed by: John Scarlett-Davies
  Production company: Aldabra
2. "Heavenly Action"
  Directed by: John Scarlett-Davies
  Production company: Aldabra
3. "Oh L'amour"
  Directed by: Peter Hamilton and Alistair Rae
4. "Sometimes"
  Directed by: Gerard de Thame
  Production company: Lee Lacy
5. "It Doesn't Have to Be"
  Directed by: Gerard de Thame
  Production company: HLA
6. "Victim of Love"
  Directed by: Peter Scammell
  Production company: State
7. "The Circus"
  Directed by: Jerry Chater
  Production company: Media Lab
8. "Ship of Fools"
  Directed by: Phillip Vile
  Production company: HLA
9. "Chains of Love"
  Directed by: Peter Christopherson
  Production company: Aubrey Powell Productions
10. "A Little Respect"
  Directed by: Peter Christopherson
  Production company: Aubrey Powell Productions
11. "Stop!"
  Directed by: Peter Christopherson
  Production company: Aubrey Powell Productions
12. "Drama!"
  Directed by: The Giblets
  Production company: HLA
13. "You Surround Me"
  Directed by: James le Bon
  Production company: Popata
14. "Blue Savannah"
  Directed by: Kevin Godley
  Production company: Media Lab
15. "Star"
  Directed by: John Maybury
  Production company: Limelight
16. "Chorus"
  Directed by: David Mallet
  Production company: Serpent Films
17. "Love to Hate You"
  Directed by: David Mallet
  Production company: Serpent Films
18. "Am I Right?"
  Directed by: Angela Conway
  Production company: State
19. "Breath of Life"
  Directed by: Angela Conway
  Production company: State
20. "Lay All Your Love on Me"
  Directed by: Jan Kounen
  Production company: HLA
21. "S.O.S."
  Directed by: Jan Kounen
  Production company: HLA
22. "Take a Chance on Me"
  Directed by: Philippe Gautier
  Production company: Oil Factory
23. "Voulez-Vous"
  Directed by: Jan Kounen
  Production company: HLA
24. "Always"
  Directed by: Jan Kounen
  Production company: HLA
25. "Run to the Sun"
  Directed by: Nico Beyer
  Production company: Propaganda
26. "I Love Saturday"
  Directed by: Caz Gorham and Frances Dickenson
  Production company: The Christmas TV and Film Co.
27. "Stay with Me"
  Directed by: Mario Cavalli
  Production company: Pizazz
28. "Fingers & Thumbs (Cold Summer's Day)"
  Directed by: Max Abbiss-Biro
  Production company: Sensons Films
29. "Rock Me Gently"
  Directed by: Max Abbiss-Biro
  Production company: Sensons Films
30. "In My Arms"
  Directed by: Dick Carruthers
  Production company: Bug
31. "Don't Say Your Love Is Killing Me"
  Directed by: Richard Heslop
  Production company: Oil Factory
32. "Rain"
33. "Freedom"
  Directed by: Vince Clarke
  Production company: State
34. "Solsbury Hill"
  Directed by: Vince Clarke
  Production company: Battlecruiser
35. "Make Me Smile (Come Up and See Me)"
  Directed by: Jonas Odell
  Production company: Nexus

=== Disc two ===
1. "Sometimes" (Top of the Pops debut performance, 20 November 1986)
2. "Sono Luminus" (acoustic version)
3. "In My Arms" (U.S. version)
  Directed by: Geoff Moore
4. "Too Darn Hot" (from Red, Hot and Blue)
  Directed by: Adelle Luts and Sandy McLeod
5. "Leave Me to Bleed" (live – The Circus Tour, 17 April 1987)
6. "A Little Respect" (live – The Innocents Tour, 15 November 1988)
7. "Supernature" (live – Wild! Tour, 11 December 1989)
8. "Waiting for the Day" (live – Phantasmagorical Entertainment Tour, 6 August 1992)
9. "Fingers & Thumbs (Cold Summer's Day)" (live – The Tiny Tour, 11 November 1996)
10. Promotional documentary: Chorus, 1991
11. Promotional documentary: Pop! The First 20 Hits, 1992
12. Promotional documentary: I Say I Say I Say, 1994
13. Promotional documentary: Erasure, 1995
14. Promotional documentary: Cowboy, 1997
15. Promotional documentary: Hits!, 2003
