= EBX =

EBX may refer to:

- East Bay Express, a California newspaper
- EB Games Expo, an Australian video game convention
- EBX (album), a four-volume box set by the band Erasure
- EBX Group, a Brazil-based company group with oil-based business
- EBX, a videogame retailer owned by Electronics Boutique
- EBX register, a processor register on the IA-32 microprocessor architecture
- Electronic Brachytherapy (EBX) - treatment for skin cancer
- EBX (Embedded Board eXpandable), a motherboard form factor (Motherboard form factor#EBX)
