= Pop! Remixed =

Remix album by Erasure
- Released: 9 February 2009
- Recorded: 2000–2009
- Genre: Synth-pop; dance
- Label: Mute
- Producer: Flood; Stephen Hague; Dave Jacob; Erasure; Gareth Jones; Mark Saunders; Martyn Phillipps; David Bascombe

Erasure chronology
Live at the Royal Albert Hall (2007)	Pop! Remixed (2009)	Total Pop! The First 40 Hits (2009)

Pop! Remixed is a remix EP by English synth-pop duo Erasure, released on 9 February 2009. It is a companion piece and prequel to the Total Pop! The First 40 Hits compilation and contains new remixes of previously released songs including a new remix of their song Always, titled Always 2009.

== Track listing ==
=== Standard release ===
1. "Always 2009"
2. "Victim of Love" (Komputer Remix)
3. "Freedom" (Mark Pichicotti – Strumapella Mix)
4. "Drama!" (Andy Bell & JC Remix)
5. "A Little Respect" (Avantara Remix)
6. "Fingers & Thumbs (Cold Summer's Day)" (Sound Factory Remix)
7. "Ship of Fools" (Soil in the Synth Remix)
8. "Always" (MHC Remix)
9. "Chorus" (Electronic Periodic Remix)
10. "Stop!" (Vince Clarke Sync 82 Remix)
11. "Drama!" (Dogmatix Dramatical Dub) (bonus track on 11-track digital download bundle)

=== Digital download ===
1. "Always 2009" – 4:01
2. "Fingers & Thumbs (Cold Summer's Day)" (Sound Factory Remix Radio Edit) – 4:07
3. "A Little Respect" (Avantara Remix Radio Edit) – 3:33
4. "Always" (MHC Remix Radio Edit) – 3:45

== Charts ==
Chart performance for Pop! Remixed
Chart (2009)	Peak position
UK Budget Albums (OCC)	16
