= I Love Saturday =

1994 single by Erasure

Single by Erasure

from the album I Say I Say I Say
- B-side: "Dodo"
- Released: 18 November 1994
- Genre: Electro-pop; hi-NRG
- Length: 4:02 (album version); 3:59 (single version)
- Label: Mute
- Songwriters: Vince Clarke; Andy Bell
- Producer: Martyn Ware

Erasure singles chronology
| "Run to the Sun" (1994) | "I Love Saturday" (1994) | "Stay with Me" (1995) |

Music video
- "I Love Saturday" on YouTube

I Love Saturday

EP by Erasure
- Released: 21 November 1994
- Genre: Synth-pop
- Length: 24:55
- Label: Mute
- Producer: Martyn Ware

Erasure EPs chronology
| Abba-esque (1992) | I Love Saturday (1994) | Rain: Plus (1997) |

"I Love Saturday" is a song and extended play (EP) by English synth-pop duo Erasure. The song was released as the third single from their sixth studio album, I Say I Say I Say (1994), on 18 November 1994 in Japan. The track was written by Vince Clarke and Andy Bell and produced by Martyn Ware. In the United Kingdom, Mute Records credited the first CD single as the I Love Saturday EP, which contains several new tracks; it was released on 21 November 1994.

"I Love Saturday" was issued via Mute Records in the UK and Elektra Records in the U.S.. The single peaked at number 20 on both the UK Singles Chart and the U.S. Billboard Dance Club Play chart. The song also reached number 34 in Sweden and number 69 in Germany. Its accompanying music video was directed by Caz Gorham and Francis Dickenson, filmed in Andy Bell's home in Spain.

== Critical reception ==
AllMusic editor Ned Raggett wrote that "I Love Saturday" "neatly balances pepped up energy on Clarke's part with a lower-key delivery from Bell" and called it a "striking combination". Upon the release, Larry Flick from Billboard magazine described it as a "bouncy foray into trance-colored hi-NRG waters." He complimented Bell's "always striking voice". Ross Jones from The Guardian commented, "Every melancholic pop hook from the last 10 years lovingly stitched together with asphyxiating grace." Chris Gerard from Metro Weekly said the song is "great" and "infectious", adding that it "features Bell showing off his falsetto in the verses."

Mario Tarradell for The Miami Herald called it "bouncy fun" and "ideal summer fare – light, bubbly and innocuous." A reviewer from Music & Media wrote, "Saturday night fever is ruling again. Only the musical format has changed from disco to camp electro pop with, as ever, a high sing-along quotient." John Kilgo from The Network Forty named it "another fun pop hit". Johnny Cigarettes from NME viewed it as "a low-calorie, caffeine-free, dilute-to-taste slush about some non-existent lost love, set to a Bontempi automatic beat." Dejan Kovacevic from Pittsburgh Post-Gazette praised the song as "an instant Erasure classic", while David Sinclair from The Times named it the best number of the album.

== Music video ==
A music video was produced to promote the single. It was directed by Caz Gorham and Francis Dickenson and was released on 21 November 1994. The video is made as a jaunty holiday clip shot in Bell's Majorcan home.

== Track listings ==
- UK CD1 (I Love Saturday EP)
1. "I Love Saturday"
2. "Ghost"
3. "Truly, Madly, Deeply"
4. "Tragic" (live vocal)
- UK CD2
- Australian CD and cassette single
- Japanese mini-CD single
1. "I Love Saturday"
2. "I Love Saturday" (JX mix)
3. "I Love Saturday" (Beatmasters dub mix)
4. "Dodo"
- UK CD3
1. "I Love Saturday" (Beatmasters club mix)
2. "I Love Saturday" (Flower mix)
3. "I Love Saturday" (303 mix)
4. "Always" (X dub cut)
- UK 12-inch single

A1. "I Love Saturday"
A2. "I Love Saturday" (Beatmasters club mix)
B1. "I Love Saturday" (JX mix)
B2. "I Love Saturday" (Flower mix)

- UK cassette single
1. "I Love Saturday"
2. "Dodo"
3. "Because You're So Sweet"
- US maxi-CD single
1. "I Love Saturday" (JX mix)
2. "I Love Saturday" (Beatmasters dub mix)
3. "I Love Saturday" (Beatmasters club mix)
4. "I Love Saturday" (Flower mix)
5. "Dodo"
6. "Because You're So Sweet"
- US 12-inch single

A1. "I Love Saturday" (JX mix)
A2. "I Love Saturday" (Beatmasters dub mix)
B1. "I Love Saturday" (Beatmasters club mix)
B2. "I Love Saturday" (Flower mix)

- US cassette single
1. "I Love Saturday"
2. "Dodo"

== Charts ==
| Chart (1994–1995) | Peak position |
|---|---|
| Belgium (BRT Top 30) | 27 |
| Europe (Eurochart Hot 100) | 76 |
| Europe (European Hit Radio) | 20 |
| Germany (GfK) | 69 |
| Israel (IBA) | 18 |
| Lithuania (M-1) | 15 |
| Scotland Singles (OCC) | 20 |
| Sweden (Sverigetopplistan) | 34 |
| UK Singles (OCC) | 20 |
| UK Airplay (Music Week) | 13 |
| UK Club Chart (Music Week) | 51 |
| UK Indie (Music Week) | 1 |
| US Dance Club Songs (Billboard) | 20 |
| US Dance Singles Sales (Billboard) | 43 |

== Release history ==
| Region | Date | Format(s) | Label(s) | Ref. |
|---|---|---|---|---|
| Japan | 18 November 1994 | Mini-CD | Mute | |
| United Kingdom | 21 November 1994 | CD1; CD2; cassette | Mute | |
| United Kingdom | 28 November 1994 | CD3 | Mute | |
| Australia | 28 November 1994 | CD; cassette | Liberation; Mute | |
