= Run to the Sun =

1994 single by Erasure

Single by Erasure

from the album I Say I Say I Say
- B-side: "Tenderest Moments"
- Released: 18 July 1994
- Genre: Dance-pop; hi-NRG; synth-pop
- Length: 4:12 (single version); 4:25 (album version)
- Label: Mute
- Songwriters: Vince Clarke; Andy Bell
- Producer: Martyn Ware

Erasure singles chronology
"Always" (1994)	"Run to the Sun" (1994)	"I Love Saturday" (1994)

Music video
- "Run to the Sun" on YouTube

"Run to the Sun" is a song by English synth-pop duo Erasure, released in July 1994 by Mute and Elektra Records as the second single from the duo's sixth studio album, I Say I Say I Say (1994). The song was written by Vince Clarke with fellow Erasure member Andy Bell and is an uptempo dance music track that displays signature synthesizer programming by Clarke. The bridge (or middle eight) section quotes the opening measures of their earlier hit "A Little Respect". The UK 7-inch single of "Run to the Sun" was issued on yellow-coloured vinyl and featured a fold-out poster of the single's cover artwork. The single's B-side, a ballad entitled "Tenderest Moments", was later re-recorded by Erasure in an acoustic version for their 2006 album Union Street.

Released on 18 July, "Run to the Sun" peaked at number six on the UK Singles Chart, becoming Erasure's 15th UK top-10 hit. In the U.S. the song reached number 24 on the Billboard Bubbling Under Hot 100 Singles chart and number 14 on the Billboard Hot Dance Music/Club Play chart. Elsewhere, the song reached number five in Finland, number 19 in Ireland and Sweden, and number 49 in Germany. Its accompanying music video was directed by Nico Beyer and filmed in Berlin.

== Critical reception ==
Larry Flick from Billboard magazine described "Run to the Sun" as a "rave-happy pop/dance ditty", noting that "as always, singer Andy Bell is a delight, while synthmaster Vince Clarke offers a racing beat and tweaking computer noises. Layered between the two is a sweet, contagious hook that sticks to the brain upon impact." Cash Box named it one of the best tracks from the "excellent new Erasure album", calling it a "quickly-paced, freestyle synth romp." The reviewer added, "Vince Clark [sic] flicks his snappy keyboard stings throughout, while Andy Bell's songbird voice and longing-for-thou lyrics shoot right for the heart. Top-40 potential here, with alternative and modern rockers again laying the foundation for the band." Chris Willman from Los Angeles Times felt the song, "which may or may not be a paean to a departed loved one, should score big at the clubs."

Alan Jones from Music Week wrote, "Too much bluster and too little substance here, as Erasure switch to automatic pilot on a song that lacks melodic substance. Not one of their bigger hits, though it should make a brief appearance in the Top 20." Sylvia Patterson of NME remarked, "You thought 'Always' was dreary and then this! A dot-to-dot doodle of hyperactive keyboards with some crumby '70s 'whzzzzing' and 'poo-poo!' bits and cobblers lyrics and no chorus whatsoever. Andy 'Ding Dong' Bell knows better, so does Cardboard Ken." James Hamilton from the RM Dance Update described it as "old fashioned galloping 133.9bpm Hi-NRG" in his weekly dance column. Gina Morris from Select called it "another formulated hi-NRG, annoyingly-catchy pop song. Worth the effort if only for the interesting techno, ambient and Europop remixes on the B-side." Another Select editor, Siân Pattenden, said it has "bibbly keyboards of the Early Pulp Era!". Tony Cross from Smash Hits wrote, "Much more up front than the thoughtful 'Always', this is the duo back to their high energy peak. But despite the pace, Andy's voice sounds as close to tears as ever." Dardy Chang from American independent newspaper Stanford Daily stated that its "bouncy, relentless" beat "makes it an instant dance hit."

== Retrospective response ==
AllMusic editor Ned Raggett viewed the song as "strident" and "full-on pep". Darren Lee from The Quietus declared it a "surefooted day-glo" pop anthem, "which fitted seamlessly into the canon". Sal Cinquemani from Slant Magazine remarked that Andy Bell explores lower voice registers on "inventive and ornate overdubs pad songs", like "the sci-fi/techno dance" number 'Run to the Sun'.

== Music video ==
The music video for "Run to the Sun" was directed by German director Nico Beyer. It was shot at the World Clock in Alexanderplatz, Berlin, and features an early appearance by Jason Statham as a silver-painted background dancer. The video was B-listed on German music television channel VIVA in September 1994.

== Track listings ==
- UK CD1
1. "Run to the Sun" – 4:13
2. "Tenderest Moments" – 5:29
3. "Run to the Sun" (Beatmasters' Galactic mix) – 7:19
- UK CD2
1. "Run to the Sun" (Beatmasters' Outergalactic mix) – 5:37
2. "Run to the Sun" (The Simon & Diamond Bhangra remix) – 4:25
3. "Run to the Sun" (Set the Controls for the Heart of the Sun mix) – 6:20
4. "Run to the Sun" (Amber Solaire) – 10:11
- UK 12-inch single

A1. "Run to the Sun"
A2. "Run to the Sun" (Beatmasters' Galactic mix)
A3. "Run to the Sun" (Amber Solaire)
B1. "Run to the Sun" (Beatmasters' Outergalactic mix)
B2. "Run to the Sun" (The Simon & Diamond Bhangra remix)
B3. "Run to the Sun" (Set the Controls for the Heart of the Sun mix)
B4. "Run to the Sun" (Diss-Cuss mix)

- UK 7-inch and cassette single; Japanese mini-CD single
1. "Run to the Sun"
2. "Tenderest Moments"
3. "Run to the Sun" (Beatmasters' Intergalactic mix)
- US, Canadian, and Australian maxi-CD single
1. "Run to the Sun" (7-inch version) – 4:14
2. "Run to the Sun" (Beatmasters' Galactic mix) – 7:22
3. "Run to the Sun" (Amber Solaire mix) – 10:14
4. "Run to the Sun" (Beatmasters' Outergalactic mix) – 5:38
5. "Run to the Sun" (The Simon & Diamond Bhangra remix) – 4:27
6. "Run to the Sun" (Set the Controls for the Heart of the Sun mix) – 6:20
- US cassette single
1. "Run to the Sun" (7-inch mix)
2. "Run to the Sun" (Beatmasters' Intergalactic mix)
3. "Tenderest Moments"

== Charts ==
=== Weekly charts ===
Chart (1994)	Peak position
Belgium (Ultratop 50 Flanders)	39
Europe (Eurochart Hot 100)	33
Europe (European Dance Radio)	8
Europe (European Hit Radio)	19
Finland (Suomen virallinen lista)	5
Germany (GfK)	49
Ireland (IRMA)	19
Israel (Israeli Singles Chart)	1
Scottish Singles Sales (Official Charts)	8
Sweden (Sverigetopplistan)	19
UK Singles (Official Charts)	6
UK Airplay (Music Week)	8
UK Club Chart (Music Week)	55
UK Indie (Music Week)	1
US Bubbling Under Hot 100 (Billboard)	24
US Dance Club Songs (Billboard)	14
US Dance Singles Sales (Billboard)	48

=== Year-end charts ===
Chart (1994)	Position
UK Singles (OCC)	150

== Release history ==
Region	Date	Format(s)	Label(s)	Ref.
United Kingdom	18 July 1994	7-inch vinyl; CD; cassette	Mute	
Japan	21 July 1994	Mini-CD	Mute	
Australia	1 August 1994	CD; cassette	Liberation; Mute	
