= I Say I Say I Say =

Studio album by Erasure
- Released: 16 May 1994
- Recorded: 1993
- Studios: Studio 142, The Church (London), Windmill Lane (Dublin), 37B (Chertsey, Surrey)
- Genres: Synth-pop; dance
- Length: 44:08
- Labels: Mute (UK); Elektra (US)
- Producer: Martyn Ware

Erasure chronology
Chorus (1991)	I Say I Say I Say (1994)	Erasure (1995)

Singles from I Say I Say I Say
- 1. "Always" Released: 11 April 1994; 2. "Run to the Sun" Released: 18 July 1994; 3. "I Love Saturday" Released: 18 November 1994

Professional ratings
Review scores
Source	Rating
AllMusic	3/5 stars
Entertainment Weekly	B
Los Angeles Times	2.5/4 stars
Music Week	3/5 stars
NME	7/10
The Observer	(favorable)
Select	2/5 medals
Smash Hits	4/5 stars

I Say I Say I Say is the sixth studio album by English synth-pop duo Erasure, released in 1994 by Mute Records in the UK and Elektra Records in the U.S. The album was produced by Martyn Ware, who was a founding member of veteran synth-pop groups the Human League and Heaven 17.

Upon its release it became Erasure's fourth consecutive studio album to hit No. 1 in the UK, and fifth overall, generating three top-20 singles. In the U.S., I Say I Say I Say debuted and peaked at number 18 on the Billboard 200, easily beating their previous highest chart placing. In Germany the album climbed to number six.

Although Erasure always maintained popularity in the U.S. dance club community, with the rise of grunge rock Erasure saw their exposure on college radio, mainstream stations, and MTV become mostly non-existent by 1994. This made it even more of a surprise when the ballad "Always" gave them their third top-20 hit on the Billboard Hot 100 in September.

The album saw keyboardist/programmer Vince Clarke continue with his by-then trademark exclusive usage of pre-MIDI analog synthesizers and sequencers, with the additional self-imposed constraint that no drum machines were to be used either. Instead, Clarke used synthesizers to create the album's drum and percussion sounds.

== Critical reception ==
Upon its release, James Slattery of Melody Maker felt Erasure had taken a "misguided quest for serious critical acclaim", resulting in the "greatest singles band in the last 10 years" to produce an album without one "shag-happy top-five certainty" and only "glimpses of what might've been". He said, "Erasure seem too willing to rein in the extravagances and plump for a utilitarian pop-techno sound, pussy-footing around in a fog of lightweight moderation." Alan Jones of Music Week remarked that the album "sadly contains fewer songs of merit than any previous Erasure album" and predicted it would be "huge initially" but with a "shorter chart life than usual". He singled out "Always" for "standing head and shoulders above the rest".

Steven Wells of NME felt the band had "once again proven themselves worthy" with an album which "runs the whole gamut of current bink-bash-bleep-bonk-diddley-bop dancepop". He added, "There are ten screamingly obviously international top-ten hits here, all of them hymns to an innocence which yearns desperately to be corrupted and all of them with fabulous, juddering, soaring, sickeningly sweet melodies that wiggle and jiggle past the appalled intellect and make straight for the tear ducts." Emma Cochrane from Smash Hits wrote, "Whether they're camping it up (complete with choir) on 'So the Story Goes' or bopping about on 'Run to the Sun', these boys are onto a winner, and they know it." Slant Magazine included it on their 2003 list of 50 Essential Pop Albums.

== Track listing ==
All tracks are written by Andy Bell and Vince Clarke.

No.	Title	Length
1.	"Take Me Back"	4:55
2.	"I Love Saturday"	4:02
3.	"Man in the Moon"	4:06
4.	"So the Story Goes"	4:08
5.	"Run to the Sun"	4:25
6.	"Always"	3:57
7.	"All Through the Years"	4:59
8.	"Blues Away"	5:01
9.	"Miracle"	4:12
10.	"Because You're So Sweet"	4:17

On the Chilean/Argentinian cassette version, there's a Spanish rendition of "Always" (Spanish vocal), just before "Always".

In the Philippine release of this album in MC, two extended remixes of "Always" were added as hidden tracks (no mention or credits in the inlay), one at the start of each side (before "Take Me Back" on Side 1 and the original "Always" on Side 2).

== 2016 "Erasure 30" 30th anniversary BMG reissue LP ==
Subsequent to their acquisition of Erasure's back catalog, and in anticipation of the band's 30th anniversary, BMG commissioned reissues of all previously released UK editions of Erasure albums up to and including 2007's Light at the End of the World. All titles were pressed and distributed by Play It Again Sam on 180-gram vinyl and shrink-wrapped with a custom anniversary sticker.

== Personnel ==
- Andy Bell – vocals
- Vince Clarke – synthesizers, programming
- Sy-Jenq Cheng – design
- Mike Cosford – paintings
- John Dexter – arranger, conductor
- Luke Gifford – assistant engineer
- Norman Hathaway – design
- Andy Houston – engineer
- Rob Kirwan – assistant engineer
- Phil Legg – engineer, mixing
- Kevin Metcalfe – editing
- St. Patrick's Cathedral Choir – choir, chorus
- Al Stone – engineer
- Martyn Ware – producer
- Olaf Wendt – artwork
- Kevin Metcalfe – mastering

== Charts ==
=== Weekly charts ===
Weekly chart performance for I Say I Say I Say
Chart (1994)	Peak position
Australian Albums (ARIA)	107
Austrian Albums (Ö3 Austria)	2
Canada Top Albums/CDs (RPM)	32
Danish Albums (Hitlisten)	9
Dutch Albums (Album Top 100)	85
European Albums (Music & Media)	5
Finnish Albums (Suomen virallinen lista)	17
German Albums (Offizielle Top 100)	6
Hungarian Albums (MAHASZ)	19
Scottish Albums (Official Charts)	1
Spanish Albums (AFYVE)	33
Swedish Albums (Sverigetopplistan)	3
Swiss Albums (Schweizer Hitparade)	17
UK Albums (Official Charts)	1
US Billboard 200	18

=== Year-end charts ===
Year-end chart performance for I Say I Say I Say
Chart (1994)	Position
Austrian Albums (Ö3 Austria)	33
European Albums (Music & Media)	57
German Albums (Offizielle Top 100)	42
UK Albums (OCC)	66

== Certifications ==
Certifications for I Say I Say I Say
Region	Certification	Certified units/sales
United Kingdom (BPI)	Gold	100,000^{^}
^{^} Shipments figures based on certification alone.
