= The Circus (Erasure album) =

Studio album by Erasure
- Released: 30 March 1987
- Recorded: 1986–1987
- Studios: Worldwide International, The Garden, Strongroom, The Power Plant (London)
- Genre: Synth-pop
- Length: 38:23
- Label: Mute
- Producers: Flood; Vince Clarke

Erasure chronology
Wonderland (1986)	The Circus (1987)	The Innocents (1988)

Singles from The Circus
- 1. "Sometimes" Released: 6 October 1986; 2. "It Doesn't Have to Be" Released: 16 February 1987; 3. "Victim of Love" Released: 18 May 1987; 4. "The Circus" Released: 21 September 1987

Professional ratings
Review scores
Source	Rating
AllMusic	3/5 stars
Q	4/5 stars
Record Mirror	3.5/5 stars
The Rolling Stone Album Guide	3/5 stars
Sounds	3/5 stars

The Circus is the second studio album by the English synth-pop duo Erasure, released on 30 March 1987 by Mute Records in Germany and the United Kingdom and on 7 July 1987 by Sire Records in the United States. It was Erasure's second consecutive album to be produced by Flood.

The Circus became the duo's breakthrough in the UK, spawning four successful singles and reaching number six. It was an immediate success thanks to the number two UK placing of the first single "Sometimes", six months earlier. The album remains Erasure's longest-running on the UK charts.

Although mainstream success in the US did not occur with this album, it did generate two hits (including a number-one) on Billboard's Hot Dance Music/Club Play chart. It also became their first record to enter the Billboard 200.

The Two Ring Circus, also released in 1987, is a double 12-inch remix album that served as a companion piece to The Circus. It includes remixes and re-recordings along with live bonus tracks on the cassette and CD versions.

== Reissues ==
On 4 July 2011, EMI re-released Erasure's first two albums in 2CD/DVD format. Both feature the original album remastered, plus another disc of tracks associated with the album, and a DVD containing promo videos and a live concert.

Subsequent to their acquisition of Erasure's back catalogue, and in anticipation of the band's 30th anniversary in 2016, BMG commissioned reissues of all previously released UK editions of Erasure albums up to and including 2007's Light at the End of the World. All titles were pressed and distributed by Play It Again Sam on 180-gram vinyl and shrinkwrapped with a custom anniversary sticker.

In 2016, American boutique record label Intervention Records acquired access to Sire Records' US analogue masters of Erasure's Wonderland (1986) and The Circus (1987), as well as the rights to remaster and reissue them. Wonderland was released in December of that year, pressed on 180-gram vinyl and in a 60s-style Tip-On jacket. However, despite finalized art copy and announcing that production had completed for its Q1 2017 release, The Circus was withdrawn in February of that year.

== Track listing ==
All tracks are written by Andy Bell & Vince Clarke, except where noted.

Side A
No.	Title	Length
1.	"It Doesn't Have to Be"	3:53
2.	"Hideaway"	3:48
3.	"Don't Dance"	3:36
4.	"If I Could"	3:52
5.	"Sexuality"	3:55

Side B
No.	Title	Length
6.	"Victim of Love"	3:40
7.	"Leave Me to Bleed"	3:21
8.	"Sometimes"	3:38
9.	"The Circus"	5:30
10.	"Spiralling"	3:10
Total length:		38:23

CD Bonus Tracks
No.	Title	Writer(s)	Length
11.	"In the Hall of the Mountain King" (New Version)	Edvard Grieg	2:58
12.	"Sometimes" (12" mix)		5:22
13.	"It Doesn't Have to Be" (Boop Oopa Doo Mix)		7:12
Total length:			52:55

2011 Reissue, Disc two: Bonus CD
No.	Title	Writer(s)	Length
1.	"Sexuality" (12" Mix)		6:48
2.	"Sometimes" (Shiver Mix)		5:53
3.	"The Circus" (Bareback Rider Mix)		6:24
4.	"Who Needs Love Like That?" (Betty Boop Mix)		7:34
5.	"It Doesn't Have to Be" (Cement Mix)		5:35
6.	"The Soldier's Return" (The Return of the Radical Radcliffe Mix)		5:06
7.	"Victim of Love" (Vixen Vitesse Mix)		5:50
8.	"If I Could" (Japanese Mix)		3:45
9.	"The Circus" (Radio 1 Session, 10 March 1987)		4:42
10.	"Gimme! Gimme! Gimme!" (Radio 1 Session, 10 March 1987)	Benny Andersson & Björn Ulvaeus	3:46
11.	"Spiralling" (Radio 1 Session, 10 March 1987)		2:25
12.	"Phantom Bride" (Radio 1 Session, 10 March 1987)		3:21
Total length:			61:09

== Charts ==
=== Weekly charts ===
Weekly chart performance for The Circus
Chart (1987)	Peak position
Argentine Albums (CAPIF)	16
Australian Albums (Kent Music Report)	97
Brazilian Albums (Nopem/ABPD)	1
Canada Top Albums/CDs (RPM)	91
European Albums (Music & Media)	16
Finnish Albums (Suomen virallinen lista)	24
German Albums (Offizielle Top 100)	16
New Zealand Albums (RMNZ)	40
Swedish Albums (Sverigetopplistan)	12
Swiss Albums (Schweizer Hitparade)	9
UK Albums (Official Charts)	6
UK Independent Albums (MRIB)	1
US Billboard 200	190

=== Year-end charts ===
1987 year-end chart performance for The Circus
Chart (1987)	Position
European Albums (Music & Media)	45
UK Albums (Gallup)	31

1988 year-end chart performance for The Circus
Chart (1988)	Position
UK Albums (Gallup)	88

== Certifications ==
Certifications for The Circus
Region	Certification	Certified units/sales
United Kingdom (BPI)	Platinum	300,000^{^}
^{^} Shipments figures based on certification alone.

== Release history ==
Release history for The Circus
Region	Date	Label
Germany	30 March 1987	Mute
United Kingdom	30 March 1987	Mute
United States	7 July 1987	Sire
