= Wonderland (Erasure album) =

Studio album by Erasure
- Released: 1 May 1986
- Recorded: 1985–1986
- Studio: Trident (London)
- Genre: Synth-pop
- Length: 37:08
- Label: Mute
- Producer: Flood

Erasure chronology
Wonderland (1986)	The Circus (1987)

Singles from Wonderland
- 1. "Who Needs Love Like That" Released: 2 September 1985; 2. "Heavenly Action" Released: 11 November 1985; 3. "Oh l'amour" Released: 21 April 1986

Wonderland is the debut studio album by English synth-pop duo Erasure, released on 1 May 1986 by Sire Records in the United States and on 2 June 1986 by Mute Records in the United Kingdom and Germany. Not an immediate success, the three singles released from it failed to crack the top 40 in the UK. "Who Needs Love Like That" would eventually make the UK top 10 in 1992, and "Oh l'amour" reached the UK top 20 in 2003, both in remixed form promoting their Pop! The First 20 Hits and Hits! compilations respectively. However, the album fared better in both Germany and Sweden, where it charted within the top 20.

Erasure's initial exposure in the US came via dance clubs, as two singles reached the top 10 on Billboard's Hot Dance Music/Club Play chart.

At the time of its release, Wonderland was considered a failure, especially when comparing it to Clarke's prior successes with Depeche Mode and Yazoo. Andy Bell has stated that Alison Moyet was an influence of his vocals and he used to practice to Yazoo songs.

== Critical reception ==
Professional ratings
Review scores
Source	Rating
AllMusic	4.5/5 stars
Sounds	2/5 stars

In a contemporary review for Billboard's "Dance Trax" column, Brian Chin wrote that "Erasure's Wonderland (Sire) may just be the nicest thing ever produced by Mute Records. 'Reunion' and 'Oh l'amour' are pop-disco that would be hi-NRG if harder; other highlights on this enjoyable album are the shuffler 'Say What' and 'Love Is a Loser,' as arch and ambiguous as any Boy George song." John Wilde of Sounds was negative, calling it "dizzy, dreary plink-plop, pitter-patter Caslo calculator pop piffle" and a "gormless parody of all that damp, muddled dough-pop that parodied the semi-decent Yazoo all that time ago". He felt the tracks "lack any true, unassumed drama or splendour" as Erasure "pack these trite, vapid creaks of melody with a Mills & Boon breadth of vision".

== Track listing ==
All tracks are written by Andy Bell & Vince Clarke, except where noted.

Side One
No.	Title	Writer(s)	Length
1.	"Who Needs Love Like That"	Clarke	3:18
2.	"Reunion"		3:25
3.	"Cry So Easy"	Bell	3:36
4.	"Push Me Shove Me"	Clarke	5:10
5.	"Heavenly Action"		3:30

Side Two
No.	Title	Writer(s)	Length
6.	"Say What"		3:56
7.	"Love Is a Loser"		3:02
8.	"Senseless"		3:26
9.	"My Heart... So Blue"	Clarke	4:30
10.	"Oh l'amour"		3:04
11.	"Pistol"		3:30
Total length:			37:08

CD bonus tracks
No.	Title	Length
12.	"Say What" (Remix)	7:21
13.	"March on Down the Line" (Remix)	6:05
14.	"Senseless" (Remix)	5:06
Total length:		55:40

=== US release (Sire) ===
The UK and US album versions of "Oh l'amour" were slightly different. The Brazilian edition of the album contains the live version of "Oh l'amour" as track 6. The US version drops the tracks "Push Me Shove Me" and "Pistol" and adds "March on Down the Line" which was originally the B-side to "Oh l'amour" in the UK (and also appeared in a remixed form as a CD bonus track on the UK version of the album). The CD versions of both the UK and US versions of the album have different remixes as bonus tracks.

Side One
No.	Title	Length
1.	"Who Needs Love Like That"	3:18
2.	"Reunion"	3:25
3.	"Cry So Easy"	3:36
4.	"Senseless"	5:20
5.	"Heavenly Action"	3:30

Side Two
No.	Title	Length
6.	"Say What"	3:56
7.	"Love Is a Loser"	3:02
8.	"March on Down the Line"	3:26
9.	"My Heart... So Blue"	4:31
10.	"Oh l'amour"	3:04
Total length:		35:29

CD bonus tracks
No.	Title	Length
11.	"Who Needs Love Like That" (The Love That Mix Version)	6:11
12.	"Oh l'amour" (The Funky Sisters Remix)	7:17
Total length:		48:57

=== 2011 remaster and repackage ===
On 4 July 2011, EMI re-released Erasure's first two albums in 2CD/DVD format. Both feature the original album remastered, plus another disc of tracks associated with the album, and a DVD containing promo videos and a live concert.

Disc one: Original album
No.	Title	Length
1.	"Who Needs Love Like That?"	3:19
2.	"Reunion"	3:25
3.	"Cry So Easy"	3:35
4.	"Push Me, Shove Me" (Remix)	5:20
5.	"Heavenly Action"	3:30
6.	"Say What"	3:56
7.	"Love Is a Loser"	3:02
8.	"Senseless"	3:26
9.	"My Heart... So Blue"	4:31
10.	"Oh l'amour"	3:04
11.	"Pistol"	3:30
12.	"Say What" (Remix)	7:22
13.	"March on Down the Line" (Remix)	6:07

Disc two: Bonus CD
No.	Title	Length
1.	"Who Needs Love Like That?" (Mexican Mix)	6:11
2.	"Push Me, Shove Me" (Extended as Far as Possible Mix)	4:09
3.	"Don't Say No" (Ruby Red Mix)	6:09
4.	"Heavenly Action" (12" Mix)	6:11
5.	"March on Down the Line"	3:46
6.	"Oh l'amour" (PWL Funky Sisters Say 'Ooh La La')	7:17
7.	"Gimme! Gimme! Gimme!" (Remix)	4:58
8.	"Cry So Easy" (BBC Radio One Session: Bruno Brookes, 15/11/85)	3:43
9.	"Who Needs Love Like That?" (BBC Radio One Session: Bruno Brookes, 15/11/85)	3:33
10.	"Senseless" (BBC Radio One Session 5/12/85)	3:32
11.	"Heavenly Action" (BBC Radio One Session 5/12/85)	3:38
12.	"Say What" (BBC Radio One Session 5/12/85)	3:25
13.	"Push Me, Shove Me" (BBC Radio One Session 5/12/85)	2:50

=== 2016 "Erasure 30" 30th Anniversary BMG Reissue LP ===
Subsequent to their acquisition of Erasure's back catalog, and in anticipation of the band's 30th anniversary, BMG records commissioned reissues of all previously released UK editions of Erasure albums up to and including 2007's Light at the End of the World. All titles were pressed and distributed by Play It Again Sam on 180-gram vinyl and shrinkwrapped with a custom anniversary sticker.

=== 2016 "30th Anniversary Edition" US Audiophile Remaster LP ===
In December 2016, American boutique record label Intervention Records released an audiophile-quality analogue remaster of the US release sourced from Sire's masters still held by Warner Bros. Records in the US. The release was pressed on 180-gram vinyl and in a 60s-style Tip-On jacket.

Intervention also planned and begun work on a similar release of Erasure's second album, The Circus, for the first quarter of 2017, but it was withdrawn in February of that year.

== Charts ==
Chart performance for Wonderland
Chart (1986–1987)	Peak position
Australian Albums (Kent Music Report)	89
Belgium Albums (Joepie)	14
German Albums (Offizielle Top 100)	20
Swedish Albums (Sverigetopplistan)	13
UK Albums (OCC)	71
UK Independent Albums (MRIB)	4
US Cash Box Top Albums 101 to 200	163

Chart (1990)	Peak position
Argentine Albums (CAPIF)	9
Brazilian Albums	7

== Release history ==
Release history for Wonderland
Region	Date	Label	Catalog
United States	1 May 1986	Sire	25354
United Kingdom	2 June 1986	Mute	STUMM25
