= Heavenly Action =

Single by Erasure

from the album Wonderland
- B-side: "Don't Say No"; "My Heart... So Blue"
- Released: 11 November 1985
- Recorded: 1985
- Length: 3:26
- Label: Mute (UK); Sire (US)
- Songwriters: Vince Clarke; Andy Bell
- Producer: Flood

Erasure singles chronology
"Who Needs Love Like That" (1985)	"Heavenly Action" (1985)	"Oh L'amour" (1986)

Music video
- "Heavenly Action" on YouTube

"Heavenly Action" is a song by English synth-pop duo Erasure, released in November 1985 as their second single. It is a mid-tempo pop song, written by Erasure members Vince Clarke and Andy Bell as a straightforward ode to love. Issued by Mute Records in the UK and Sire Records in the US, the single proved to be the second commercial failure for the duo (following "Who Needs Love Like That"). The music video for the song was directed by John Scarlett Davies and produced by Nick Verden for Aldabra. It features Clarke and Bell in an outer space/celestial setting, with several young children appearing as angels. To this day, "Heavenly Action" remains Erasure's lowest-charting single on the UK Singles Chart, peaking at number 100. In the United States, "Heavenly Action" was paired with "Who Needs Love Like That" on the 12-inch single and, as a double-sided hit, climbed to number eight on the US Hot Dance Music/Club Play chart. It was later included on the duo's debut album Wonderland, released in June 1986.

== Critical reception ==
In his review of Wonderland, Ned Raggett from AllMusic said that "Who Needs Love Like That" and "Heavenly Action" "aren't quite as strong but work in the general formula quite well regardless".

== Track listings ==
7", Mute / MUTE42 (UK)

1. "Heavenly Action"
2. "Don't Say No"

12", Mute / 12MUTE42 (UK)

1. "Heavenly Action" (12" Mix)
2. "Don't Say No" (Instrumental)
3. "My Heart... So Blue" (Incidental)

12", Mute / L12MUTE42 (UK)

1. "Heavenly Action" (Yellow Brick Mix)
2. "Don't Say No" (Ruby Red Mix)

2x12", Mute / D12MUTE42 (UK)

1. "Heavenly Action" (12" Mix) – 6:03
2. "Don't Say No" (Instrumental) – 3:20
3. "My Heart... So Blue" (Incidental) – 3:36
1. "Who Needs Love Like That" (Mexican Mix) – 6:08
2. "Push Me Shove Me" (Tacos Mix) – 5:46

CD, Mute / CDMUTE42 (UK)

1. "Heavenly Action"
2. "Don't Say No"
3. "Heavenly Action" (12" Mix)
4. "Don't Say No" (Instrumental)
5. "My Heart... So Blue" (Incidental)

== Charts ==
Chart (1985)	Peak position
UK Singles (Official Charts Company)	100

== Cover versions ==
- In June 2011, Maurice Harris, a singer, songwriter and music producer from Cincinnati, Ohio, released a country-themed, pop raggaeton cover version. Harris' version can be heard on his personal SoundCloud page.
