= The Innocents (Erasure album) =

Studio album by Erasure
- Released: 10 April 1988
- Recorded: Autumn 1987
- Studios: Blackwing, Swanyard (London)
- Genres: Synth-pop; dance-pop; disco
- Length: 40:08
- Label: Mute
- Producers: Stephen Hague; Dave Jacob; Erasure

Erasure chronology
The Circus (1987)	The Innocents (1988)	Wild! (1989)

Singles from The Innocents
- 1. "Ship of Fools" Released: 22 February 1988; 2. "Chains of Love" Released: 30 May 1988; 3. "A Little Respect" Released: 10 September 1988

Professional ratings
Review scores
Source	Rating
AllMusic	4.5/5 stars
NME	7/10
Number One	4/5 stars
Record Collector	4/5 stars
Record Mirror	4 1/2/5
The Rolling Stone Album Guide	2.5/5 stars
Smash Hits	7 1/2/10
Spin Alternative Record Guide	8/10

The Innocents is the third studio album by English synth-pop duo Erasure, released on 10 April 1988 by Sire and Reprise Records in the United States and on 18 April 1988 by Mute Records in Germany and the United Kingdom. Produced by Stephen Hague, it was the release that made Erasure superstars in their home country of the UK and gave them their breakthrough in the US.

The Innocents became the first in a string of number-one albums by Erasure in the UK, turning double platinum with sales over 600,000. Thanks to heavy exposure on MTV, it also spawned two major Billboard Hot 100 hits, a Top 50 placing on the Billboard 200 and Platinum album certification in the US. According to Nielsen SoundScan, 23 years after its release the album has sold a total of five million copies worldwide. It is their best selling album to date.

The album was remastered and re-released on 26 October 2009 to celebrate its 21st anniversary. Prefaced by an EP of remixes led by album track "Phantom Bride", the 21st Anniversary Edition came in a couple of flavours including a limited edition two CD/DVD set, packed inside a CD-sized 20-page hardback book that includes interviews with Vince Clarke and Andy Bell about the making of the record and their thoughts on all the tracks.

The second CD includes various rarities, including the 7″ version of the duo's take on "River Deep, Mountain High" and US-specific remixes of "Chains of Love" and "A Little Respect" that were not released in the UK singles box set.

The album cover image derives from the stained glass window of St. James and Charlemagne, in Chartres Cathedral.

== Legacy ==
Ondarock critic Giuseppe D'Amato wrote: "It's often said that a band's third album is its real litmus test, and with The Innocents (1988) Erasure pass with flying colours. For the occasion, the duo enlist American producer Stephen Hague, who had already worked with Malcolm McLaren, Pet Shop Boys, OMD, New Order and [the] Communards, and the choice proves spot on. The seasoned producer... only fine-tunes a couple of details – just enough to carve out a sound that's, if anything, even more cheeky and brash. A handful of era-defining hits are born."

Matt Mitchell of Paste Magazine stated: "The Innocents is not just a touchstone of synth-pop. [...] It’s a beloved and essential part of the queer club music canon. Few synth-pop albums kick off with such a magic foursome of songs, but 'A Little Respect,' 'Ship of Fools,' 'Phantom Bride' and 'Chains of Love' are perfect compositions that work in harmony with massive hooks and melodies to make The Innocents one of the best synth-pop albums ever made."

== Track listing ==
All tracks are written by Andy Bell & Vince Clarke, except where noted.

Side One
No.	Title	Length
1.	"A Little Respect"	3:32
2.	"Ship of Fools"	4:01
3.	"Phantom Bride"	3:32
4.	"Chains of Love"	3:38
5.	"Hallowed Ground"	4:05

Side Two
No.	Title	Length
6.	"Sixty-five Thousand"	3:23
7.	"Heart of Stone"	3:20
8.	"Yahoo!"	3:48
9.	"Imagination"	3:28
10.	"Witch in the Ditch"	3:45
11.	"Weight of the World"	3:40
Total length:		40:08

CD / Cassette bonus tracks
No.	Title	Writer(s)	Length
12.	"When I Needed You" (Melancholic Mix)		4:22
13.	"River Deep, Mountain High" (Private Dance Mix)	Jeff Barry, Ellie Greenwich, Phil Spector	7:02
Total length:			51:32

21st anniversary edition CD two
No.	Title	Writer(s)	Length
1.	"Ship of Fools" (Shiver Me Timbers Mix)		7:53
2.	"When I Needed You"		4:00
3.	"River Deep Mountain High" (7" Version)	Barry, Greenwich, Spector	3:20
4.	"Chains of Love" (The Unfettered Mix)		8:28
5.	"Don’t Suppose" (Country Joe Mix)		5:58
6.	"The Good, the Bad and the Ugly" (The Dangerous Remix)	Ennio Morricone	4:42
7.	"A Little Respect" (12" House Mix)		6:44
8.	"Like Zsa Zsa Zsa Gabor" (Mark Freegard Mix)		4:56
9.	"Love Is Colder Than Death"		2:13
10.	"Phantom Bride" (Live BBC 'In Concert')		4:08
11.	"Heart of Stone" (Live BBC 'In Concert')		3:37
12.	"Hallowed Ground" (Live BBC 'In Concert')		3:55
13.	"Witch in the Ditch" (Live BBC 'In Concert')		3:53
Total length:			63:47

21st anniversary edition DVD
No.	Title	Writer(s)	Length
1.	"Chains of Love" (Live – NEC Birmingham 15/11/88)
2.	"A Little Respect" (Live – NEC Birmingham 15/11/88)
3.	"Witch in the Ditch" (previously unreleased)
4.	"The Circus" (Live – NEC Birmingham 15/11/88)
5.	"The Hardest Part" (Live – NEC Birmingham 15/11/88)
6.	"Push Me Shove Me"
7.	"Gimme! Gimme! Gimme!" (previously unreleased)	Benny Andersson/Björn Ulvaeus
8.	"Spiralling" (Live – NEC Birmingham 15/11/88)
9.	"Hallowed Ground" (Live – NEC Birmingham 15/11/88)
10.	"Oh L’Amour" (Live – NEC Birmingham 15/11/88)
11.	"Who Needs Love Like That" (Live – NEC Birmingham 15/11/88)
12.	"Stop!" (Live – NEC Birmingham 15/11/88)
13.	"Victim of Love" (Live – NEC Birmingham 15/11/88)
14.	"Ship of Fools" (Live – NEC Birmingham 15/11/88)
15.	"Knocking on Your Door" (Live – NEC Birmingham 15/11/88)
16.	"Sometimes" (Live – NEC Birmingham 15/11/88)
17.	"Ship of Fools" (Going Live!)
18.	"A Little Respect" (Top of the Pops)
19.	"The Innocents Live" (BBC 35-minute TV special – first broadcast 12 December 1988)
20.	"Ship of Fools" (Promotional video)
21.	"Chains of Love" (Promotional video)
22.	"A Little Respect" (Promotional video)

The Innocents Live – Downloads

1. MP3 files of The Innocents Live

=== 2016 "Erasure 30" 30th anniversary BMG reissue LP ===
Subsequent to their acquisition of Erasure's back catalog and in anticipation of the band's 30th anniversary, BMG commissioned reissues of all previously released UK editions of Erasure albums up to and including 2007's Light at the End of the World. All titles were pressed and distributed by Play It Again Sam on 180-gram vinyl and shrinkwrapped with a custom anniversary sticker.

== Charts ==
=== Weekly charts ===
Weekly chart performance for The Innocents
Chart (1988)	Peak position
Argentine Albums (CAPIF)	3
Belgium Albums (Joepie)	5
Brazilian Albums (Nopem/ABPD)	1
Canada Top Albums/CDs (RPM)	54
Danish Album Charts (Tracklisten)	3
European Albums (Music & Media)	9
German Albums (Offizielle Top 100)	8
New Zealand Albums (RMNZ)	50
Norwegian Albums (VG-lista)	18
Swedish Albums (Sverigetopplistan)	13
Swiss Albums (Schweizer Hitparade)	15
UK Albums (Official Charts)	1
UK Independent Albums (MRIB)	1
US Billboard 200	49
Zimbabwe (ZIMA)	2

=== Year-end charts ===
1988 year-end chart performance for The Innocents
Chart (1988)	Position
European Albums (Music & Media)	54
German Albums (Offizielle Top 100)	45
UK Albums (Gallup)	21

1989 year-end chart performance for The Innocents
Chart (1989)	Position
European Albums (Music & Media)	50
UK Albums (Gallup)	42
UK Independent Albums (MRIB)	10

== Certifications ==
Certifications for The Innocents
Region	Certification	Certified units/sales
United Kingdom (BPI)	2× Platinum	600,000^{^}
United States (RIAA)	Platinum	1,000,000^{^}
^{^} Shipments figures based on certification alone.
