= Always (Erasure song) =

1994 single by Erasure

Single by Erasure

from the album I Say I Say I Say
- B-side: "Tragic"
- Released: 11 April 1994
- Genre: Disco; Euro-pop; synth-pop
- Length: 3:57
- Label: Mute
- Songwriters: Vince Clarke; Andy Bell
- Producer: Martyn Ware

Erasure singles chronology
"Who Needs Love Like That" (Hamburg Mix) (1992)	"Always" (1994)	"Run to the Sun" (1994)

Erasure singles chronology
"Storm in a Teacup" (2007)	"Always" (2009 Remix) (2009)	"Phantom Bride" (2009 Remaster) (2009)

Music video
- "Always" on YouTube

"Always" is a song by English synth-pop duo Erasure. The ballad was released on 11 April 1994 as the first single from their sixth studio album, I Say I Say I Say (1994). Written by Erasure members Vince Clarke and Andy Bell, it was produced by Martyn Ware. Mute Records issued the single in the United Kingdom, and Elektra Records released it in the United States.

The song became Erasure's 14th top-10 single on the UK Singles Chart, peaking at number four. In the United States, the single became Erasure's third top-20 hit on the Billboard Hot 100, peaking at number 20—six years after their last major U.S. pop hit ("A Little Respect"). On the Billboard DanceClub Play chart, the single climbed to number six. In Europe, "Always" reached number two in Austria and Sweden, number three in Finland, number four in Iceland, and number five in Germany. Its accompanying music video was directed by Jan Kounen, depicting Bell in a Chinese scroll painting-inspired setting.

== Composition ==
The song is built on synthesized instruments and with Clarke and Bell's subdued vocals and lyrics. The song's chorus features an unusual time signature change from 4/4 to 5/4 for the final line (in which the lyrics are "Harmony, harmony, oh love").

== Critical reception ==
Larry Flick from Billboard magazine stated that the song "glides along at a slick, compu-hip pace. Andy Bell has rarely sounded as good as he does here, contrasting the icy-smooth synth nature of Martyn Ware's production with a warm, well-shaded vocal. The tune is embellished with faster trance beats that fit current trends extremely well, without sacrificing the catchy hook." Troy J. Augusto from Cash Box felt that "flamboyant frontman Bell's voice is as smooth and bittersweet as ever, a nifty companion to Clarke's upbeat programming and producer Martyn Ware’s almost industrial style." David Browne from Entertainment Weekly called it a "lament" and a "moving declaration of undying love." He noted Bell's "pained, naked wisp of a voice dips upward in the chorus ("I want to be with you")." Dave Sholin from the Gavin Report said the song is "exceptional, mid-tempo Euro-pop". Caroline Sullivan from The Guardian viewed it as "timeless". In his weekly UK chart commentary, James Masterton wrote, "One of the best singles they have released for years, the anthemic pop song is sure to hang around the upper reaches for a few weeks yet." Peter Paphides from Melody Maker commented, "A bittersweet feast of feelings, with Andy Bell's ethereally lachrymose moan tantalising and trapping you forever with a chorus so ravishing that even The Four Tops' 'I Can't Help Myself' sounds like The Toy Dolls by comparison. Truly the work of angels."

Mario Tarradell for The Miami Herald deemed it as "bouncy fun" and "ideal summer fare – light, bubbly and innocuous." Pan-European magazine Music & Media commented, "Nobody can continue the early '80s like them. Flashbacks of the prototypes of synthesisers come to mind when receiving these Martian sounds bleeping through a prosaic pop song." Alan Jones from Music Week gave it a top score of five out of five, describing it as "busy, perky pop with the deftest of touches, this is another hugely commercial and nicely understated piece enlivened by Vince Clarke's tickering synths and Andy Bell's warm contralto." John Kilgo from The Network Forty named it "an interesting techno pop number". Keith Cameron of NME was negative in his review, writing that the "inconsequential Martyn Ware-produced tinkle-plop has all the allure of a Eurovision Song Contest entry circa 1982". People Magazine noted that Bell's "quasi-operatic vocals continue to lend color and depth to Clarke's effete synthetic grooves". Mark Frith from Smash Hits gave it three out of five, calling it "a nice catchy tune with strange squiggly bits and electronic noises. The annoying thing is that this could have been one of their great records if they had upped the pace and really gone for it." Dardy Chang from Stanford Daily described it as "cheesy yet pretty", noting that the song "begs you to sing along".

=== Retrospective response ===
AllMusic editor Ned Raggett described "Always" as a "wonderful ballad" with a "slightly quirky opening, strong verses both musically and lyrically, and a flat-out brilliant chorus, Bell's impassioned delivery one of his finest moments." John Hamilton from Idolator ranked the song among "The 50 Best Pop Singles of 1994" in 2014, describing it as a "bleep-bloopy disco ballad featuring some of Andy Bell’s most delicate vocals to date." Chris Gerard from Metro Weekly stated, "They made a triumphant return with 'Always', a divine synth-pop ballad that proved irresistible to pop radio." In 2009 Darren Lee from The Quietus named it a "surefooted day-glo" pop anthem, "which fitted seamlessly into the canon".

== Chart performance ==
"Always" entered the top 10 in Austria, Denmark, Finland, Germany, Iceland, Ireland, Spain, Sweden, and the United Kingdom, as well as on the Eurochart Hot 100 where the single reached number four in May 1994. In the UK it peaked at number four during its first week on the UK Singles Chart on 17 April 1994. It became Erasure's 13th top-10 single on the chart and spent two weeks at that position. Additionally, "Always" was a top-20 hit in Belgium and a top-30 hit in both Italy and Switzerland. Outside Europe the song reached number six on the U.S. Billboard Dance Club Play chart and number 20 on the Billboard Hot 100, number 17 on the U.S. Cash Box Top 100, number 19 on Canada's RPM 100 Hit Tracks chart, and number 78 in Australia. "Always" earned a gold record in Germany and a silver record in the United Kingdom.

== Music video ==
The music video for "Always" features Andy Bell in a Chinese scroll painting-inspired setting; it was directed by the Dutch-French filmmaker Jan Kounen. The inscription on the opening scroll painting reads 永恆冬 (yǒnghéng dōng - "Everlasting Winter"). The singer appears as a mystical figure flying into a wintry garden where he finds a woman standing in the cold by a pavilion. She is frozen, covered with snow, and her eyes are closed. He throws a magic ball in the air. Flowers bloom and it becomes spring in the garden. As a result, the woman wakes up. Bell picks flowers for her and combs her hair. Suddenly, a red demon-like creature appears, and it becomes dark and cold again. Bell must defend the woman against the demon, who now has the magic ball and uses it to trap the two in a huge snowball. Frozen in the snow, Bell manages to use the magic ball so that when it explodes in the air, spring returns. The demon is defeated, collapsing to the ground, and the video ends with Bell flying away from the woman in the spring garden. The inscription on the closing scroll painting reads 永恆春 (yǒnghéng chūn - "Everlasting Spring").

"Always" received heavy rotation on MTV Europe and was A-listed on Germany's VIVA in May and June 1994.

== Track listings ==
- UK and Australian CD1
- Australian cassette single
- Japanese CD single
1. "Always" (7 mix)
2. "Always" (extended mix)
3. "Tragic"
- UK and Australian CD2
- Australian remix cassette single
1. "Always" (Cappella club mix)
2. "Always" (Microbots Trance Dance mix)
3. "Always" (Microbots In Your Brain mix)
4. "Always" (Hey mix)
- UK 7-inch and cassette single
- US cassette single
1. "Always"
2. "Tragic"
- UK 12-inch single

A1. "Always" (7 mix)
A2. "Tragic"
B1. "Always" (Cappella club mix)
B2. "Always" (Microbots Trance Dance mix)

- US maxi-CD single
1. "Always" (7-inch mix)
2. "Always" (Cappella club remix)
3. "Always" (Hey mix)
4. "Tragic"
- US 12-inch single

A1. "Always" (extended mix)
A2. "Always" (Cappella club remix)
AA1. "Always" (Microbots Trance Dance mix)
AA2. "Always" (Hey mix)

== Charts ==
=== Weekly charts ===
Weekly chart performance for "Always"
Chart (1994)	Peak position
Australia (ARIA)	78
Austria (Ö3 Austria Top 40)	2
Belgium (Ultratop 50 Flanders)	19
Canada Retail Singles (The Record)	13
Canada Top Singles (RPM)	19
Denmark (Tracklisten)	5
El Salvador (UPI)	7
Europe (Eurochart Hot 100)	4
Europe (European AC Radio)	9
Europe (European Hit Radio)	3
Finland (Suomen virallinen lista)	3
Germany (GfK)	5
Iceland (Íslenski Listinn Topp 40)	4
Ireland (IRMA)	7
Israel (Israeli Singles Chart)	1
Italy (Musica e dischi)	23
Latvia (Latvian Airplay Top 20)	1
Lithuania (M-1)	1
Scottish Singles Sales (Official Charts)	5
Spain (AFYVE)	8
Sweden (Sverigetopplistan)	2
Switzerland (Schweizer Hitparade)	23
UK Singles (Official Charts)	4
UK Airplay (Music Week)	2
UK Club Chart (Music Week)	35
UK Indie (Music Week)	1
US Billboard Hot 100	20
US Alternative Airplay (Billboard)	8
US Dance Club Songs (Billboard)	6
US Dance Singles Sales (Billboard)	21
US Pop Airplay (Billboard)	8
US Cash Box Top 100	17

=== Year-end charts ===
Year-end chart performance for "Always"
Chart (1994)	Position
Austria (Ö3 Austria Top 40)	22
Brazil (Crowley)	93
Europe (Eurochart Hot 100)	39
Europe (European Hit Radio)	18
Germany (Media Control)	28
Iceland (Íslenski Listinn Topp 40)	30
Israel (Israeli Singles Chart)	1
Sweden (Topplistan)	33
UK Singles (OCC)	65
UK Airplay (Music Week)	23
US Billboard Hot 100	73

== Certifications ==
Certifications and sales for "Always"
Region	Certification	Certified units/sales
Germany (BVMI)	Gold	250,000^{^}
United Kingdom (BPI)	Silver	200,000^{‡}
^{^} Shipments figures based on certification alone.^{‡} Sales+streaming figures based on certification alone.

== Release history ==
Release dates and formats for "Always"
Region	Date	Format(s)	Label(s)	Ref.
United Kingdom	11 April 1994	7-inch vinyl; CD; cassette	Mute	
Japan	20 May 1994	CD	Mute	
Australia	13 June 1994	CD; cassette	Liberation; Mute	

== Covers ==
The song has been covered live as an intro piece by synthpop musician MNDR. In 2012 the experimental rock band Xiu Xiu covered the song for a Record Store Day single.

== In popular culture ==
The 2009 mix of the song (found on Pop! Remixed and on Total Pop! The First 40 Hits) is featured in the Robot Unicorn Attack video game.
