= The Circus (song) =

Single by Erasure

from the album The Circus
- Released: 21 September 1987
- Recorded: 1986
- Genre: Synth-pop
- Length: 5:30 (LP); 3:50 (7")
- Label: Mute (UK); Sire (US)
- Songwriters: Vince Clarke; Andy Bell
- Producer: Flood

Erasure singles chronology
"Victim of Love" (1987)	"The Circus" (1987)	"Ship of Fools" (1988)

Music video
- "The Circus" on YouTube

"The Circus" is a song by the English synth-pop duo Erasure, released on 21 September 1987 as the band's seventh single overall. It is also the title track on their second studio album, The Circus (1987). Written by Erasure members Vince Clarke and Andy Bell, the song was a departure from the shiny pop of their six previous singles, creating a more down-tempo and melancholy mood. Essentially a synth-pop track, the music is accentuated by acoustic guitar and a continuous circus-like accordion. The lyrics touch on social issues, rare for the duo, and centre on the lament of "working men", whose bright futures and job securities are left shattered in the modern world of greedy corporations and technology. The song's distinctive and unusual sound is said to have been inspired by Bell hearing a record being played backwards. The album version clocks at 5.30 minutes, so it was remixed for single release to a much more radio-friendly 3:50 minutes. Mute Records issued it as the fourth and final single from the album. Despite its haunting quality and dark lyrical content, "The Circus" became Erasure's third UK Top 10 hit, peaking at number six.

== Track listings ==
7" single (MUTE66)

1. "The Circus" (Remix)
2. "The Circus" (Decay Mix)

12" single #1 (1-12MUTE66)

1. "Victim of Love" (Live)
2. "If I Could" (Live)
3. "The Circus" (Live)
4. "Spiralling" (Live)

12" single #2 (2-12MUTE66)

1. "It Doesn't Have to Be" (Live)
2. "Who Needs Love Like That" (Live)
3. "Gimme! Gimme! Gimme! (A Man After Midnight)" (Live)
4. "The Circus" (Bareback Rider Mix)

12" single #3 (3-12MUTE66)

1. "Sometimes" (Live)
2. "Say What" (Live)
3. "Oh L'amour" (Live)
4. "The Circus" (Gladiator Mix)

12" single (Sire 20822-0)

1. "The Circus" (Gladiator Mix) – 6:07
2. "The Circus" (Decay Mix) – 5:32
3. "The Circus" (Bareback Rider Mix) – 6:35
4. "The Circus" (DJ Mix) – 3:50

CD single (CDMUTE66)

1. "The Circus" (Remix)
2. "The Circus" (Decay Mix)
3. "If I Could" (Live)
4. "It Doesn't Have to Be" (Live)
5. "Say What" (Live)
6. "The Circus" (Live)

== Charts ==
Chart (1987)	Peak position
Denmark (IFPI)	7
Ireland (IRMA)	6
UK Singles (Official Charts Company)	6
West Germany (Media Control Charts)	30
