= It Doesn't Have to Be =

Single by Erasure

from the album The Circus
- B-side: "In the Hall of the Mountain King"
- Released: 16 February 1987
- Recorded: 1986
- Genre: Synth-pop
- Length: 3:53
- Label: Mute (UK); Sire (US)
- Songwriters: Vince Clarke; Andy Bell
- Producer: Flood

Erasure singles chronology
"Sometimes" (1986)	"It Doesn't Have to Be" (1987)	"Victim of Love" (1987)

Music video
- "It Doesn't Have to Be" on YouTube

It Doesn't Have to Be
Sample containing the Kiswahili lyrics referred to in the article.

"It Doesn't Have to Be" is a song by the English synth-pop duo Erasure, released on 16 February 1987. It was issued as a single six weeks before the release of the duo's second studio album, The Circus (1987). Following the number-two UK placing of previous single "Sometimes", it became Erasure's second Top 20 hit in the UK (peaking at number twelve) and their third Top 20 hit (number sixteen) in West Germany.

The lyric of the song deplores a lack of necessity for strife and may be understood to refer to apartheid in South Africa, but there is no particular reference. The middle eight is in Swahili, an eastern African language: Lala pamoja na mimi / Nyumbani yako, nyumbani yako / Sababu wewe hapana kaa na mimi / Nyumbani yako, nyumbani yako, 'Sleep (together) with me / At your place [house], at your place / Why don't you stay with me / At your place, at your place.' So they deplore a lack of necessity for strife not only between two peoples, but also between two people.

The single's B-side is a rendition of "In the Hall of the Mountain King", a piece taken from Norwegian composer and pianist Grieg's Peer Gynt suite.

== Track listings ==
- 7" single (MUTE56)
1. "It Doesn't Have to Be"
2. "In the Hall of the Mountain King"
- 12" single (12MUTE56)
1. "It Doesn't Have to Be" (Boop Oopa Doo Mix)
2. "Who Needs Love Like That" (Betty Boop Mix)
3. "In the Hall of the Mountain King"
- Limited 12" single (L12MUTE56)
1. "It Doesn't Have to Be" (Cement Mix)
2. "Heavenly Action" (Holger Hiller Mix)
3. "In the Hall of the Mountain King" (New Version)
- CD single (CDMUTE56)
1. "It Doesn't Have to Be"
2. "In the Hall of the Mountain King"
3. "It Doesn't Have to Be" (Boop Oopa Doo Mix)
4. "Who Needs Love Like That"
- CD single (Special Edition CDMUTE56)
1. "It Doesn't Have to Be"
2. "Sometimes"
3. "Oh l'amour"
4. "Heavenly Action"
5. "Who Needs Love Like That"
6. "Gimme! Gimme! Gimme! (A Man After Midnight)" (Remix)
7. "In the Hall of the Mountain King"

== Charts ==
=== Weekly charts ===
Chart (1987)	Peak position
Belgium (Ultratop 50 Flanders)	17
Denmark (IFPI)	5
Finland (Suomen virallinen lista)	20
Germany (GfK)	16
Ireland (IRMA)	19
Italy Airplay (Music & Media)	1
Netherlands (Dutch Top 40)	38
Netherlands (Single Top 100)	34
Spain (AFYVE)	30
Sweden (Trackslistan)	10
Switzerland (Schweizer Hitparade)	19
UK Singles (OCC)	12
West Germany (Media Control Charts)	16
