= Sometimes (Erasure song) =

Single by Erasure

from the album The Circus
- B-side: "Sexuality"; "Say What"
- Released: 6 October 1986
- Genre: Synth-pop; dance-pop
- Length: 3:38
- Label: Mute
- Songwriters: Vince Clarke; Andy Bell
- Producer: Flood

Erasure singles chronology
"Oh L'amour" (1986)	"Sometimes" (1986)	"It Doesn't Have to Be" (1987)

Music video
- "Sometimes" on YouTube

"Sometimes" is a song by the English synth-pop duo Erasure, released on 6 October 1986 as their fourth single overall. Written by band members Vince Clarke and Andy Bell, it typifies the Erasure sound—an uptempo, dance-oriented pop tune accentuated by Clarke's phase distortion and analogue synthesizers and Bell's lyrics about being in love. The trumpet solo is performed by Guy Barker.

"Sometimes" peaked at number one in South Africa, reached number two in the United Kingdom and West Germany, and became an international hit. In the United States, it became Erasure's second top-five hit on the Billboard Dance/Disco Club Play chart, on which it charted in remixed form alongside "It Doesn't Have to Be" and peaked at number four. "Sometimes" was included on Erasure's second studio album, The Circus (1987), released six months later in March 1987.

== Critical reception ==
Upon its release, Andy Hurt of Sounds commented that, while "most of Vince Clarke's songs sound the same to me", "this one will add a touch of class to the airwaves". He also noted how Bell's vocals sounded similar to those of Alison Moyet. Chris Gerard from Metro Weekly retrospectively wrote, "It remains one of their signature songs. It has the classic Erasure sound of the acoustic guitar providing rhythm over the electronic beat. It's easy to see why it was their first big hit—it's irresistibly catchy and singable."

== Music video ==
The music video for the song showcases Erasure on a building rooftop—Clarke playing a resonator guitar and Bell singing—as they weave through white sheets hanging from a laundry line; near the end of the video rain starts to fall on the duo.

== Track listings ==
7-inch single (MUTE51)

1. "Sometimes"
2. "Sexuality" (single mix)

12-inch single (12MUTE51)

1. "Sometimes" (12-inch nix)
2. "Sexuality" (12-inch mix)
3. "Say What" (remix)

Limited 12-inch single (L12MUTE 51)

1. "Sometimes" (Shiver mix)
2. "Sexuality" (Private mix)
3. "Senseless" (remix)

12-inch single (Sire 20614-0)

1. "Sometimes" (extended mix) – 5:22
2. "Sometimes" (Shiver mix) – 7:30
3. "It Doesn't Have to Be" (The Boop Oopa Doo mix) – 7:12
4. "Sexuality" (Private mix) – 6:04

Cassette single (CMUTE51)

1. "Sometimes"
2. "Sexuality" (dingle mix)
3. "Who Needs Love Like That"
4. "Heavenly Action"
5. "Oh L'amour"

CD single (CDMUTE51)

1. "Sometimes"
2. "Sexuality" (single mix)
3. "Sometimes" (12-inch Mix)
4. "Sexuality" (12-inch Mix)
5. "Say What" (Remix)

== Charts ==
=== Weekly charts ===
Weekly chart performance for "Sometimes"
Chart (1986–1987)	Peak position
Australia (Kent Music Report)	45
Austria (Ö3 Austria Top 40)	10
Belgium (Ultratop 50 Flanders)	2
Colombia	8
Denmark (Hitlisten)	9
Europe (European Hot 100 Singles)	4
Finland (Suomen virallinen lista)	5
France (SNEP)	39
Ireland (IRMA)	3
Italy (Musica e dischi)	25
Netherlands (Dutch Top 40)	3
Netherlands (Single Top 100)	2
New Zealand (Recorded Music NZ)	15
Peru (UPI)	8
Portugal (AFP)	7
South Africa (Springbok Radio)	1
Spain (AFYVE)	1
Sweden (Sverigetopplistan)	20
Switzerland (Schweizer Hitparade)	3
UK Singles (OCC)	2
UK Indie (MRIB)	1
US Dance Club Songs (Billboard) Remix with "It Doesn't Have to Be"	4
US Dance Singles Sales (Billboard) Remix with "It Doesn't Have to Be"	37
West Germany (GfK)	2

=== Year-end charts ===
1986 year-end chart performance for "Sometimes"
Chart (1986)	Position
UK Singles (Gallup)	42

1987 year-end chart performance for "Sometimes"
Chart (1987)	Position
Belgium (Ultratop 50 Flanders)	44
Europe (European Hot 100 Singles)	36
Netherlands (Dutch Top 40)	42
Netherlands (Single Top 100)	33
South Africa (Springbok Radio)	16
Switzerland (Schweizer Hitparade)	28
West Germany (Media Control)	27
