= Victim of Love (Erasure song) =

Single by Erasure

from the album The Circus
- B-side: "The Soldier's Return"
- Released: 18 May 1987
- Recorded: 1986
- Genre: Pop
- Length: 3:40
- Label: Mute (UK); Sire (US)
- Songwriters: Vince Clarke; Andy Bell
- Producer: Flood

Erasure singles chronology
"It Doesn't Have to Be" (1987)	"Victim of Love" (1987)	"The Circus" (1987)

Music video
- "Victim of Love" on YouTube

"Victim of Love" is a song by the English synth-pop duo Erasure, released on 18 May 1987 as their sixth single overall. It was the third single to be lifted from the duo's second studio album, The Circus (1987), released six weeks earlier, and was remixed for single release. Written by band members Vince Clarke and Andy Bell, it incorporates the signature Erasure sound of uptempo rhythm, analogue synthesizer and a prominent acoustic guitar. Bell's lyrics pertain to one's apprehension when entering into a new love relationship. The song's protagonist doesn't "want to look like some kind of fool" or become a "victim of love". Upon its release, it became the second UK Top 10 single for Erasure, peaking at number seven. It also hit number one on the US Hot Dance Music/Club Play chart (Clarke and Bell would have to wait eighteen years before their second US Dance chart-topper). The song remains one of Erasure's signature songs and is a concert favourite.

== Critical reception ==
Chris Gerard from Metro Weekly wrote, ""Victim of Love" is a perfect pop single; Bell's soulful vocals shine, the melody is catchy and memorable, and the track has an insistent rhythm buoyed (like their breakthrough single, "Sometimes") by a strong acoustic guitar part."

== Track listings ==
7", Mute / MUTE 61 (UK)

1. "Victim of Love" (remix) – 3:38
2. "The Soldier's Return" – 3:05

12", Mute / 12 MUTE 61 (UK)

1. "Victim of Love" (extended mix) – 6:59
2. "The Soldier's Return" (The Return of the Radical Radcliffe mix) – 5:00
3. "Victim of Love" (dub mix) – 3:29

12", Mute / L12 MUTE 61 (UK)

1. "Victim of Love" (Vixen Vitesse mix) – 5:42
2. "The Soldier's Return" (The Machinery mix) – 4:16
3. "If I Could" (Japanese mix) – 3:40

12", Sire-Reprise / 20740-0 (UK)

1. "Victim of Love" (Vixen Vitesse mix) – 5:42
2. "Soldier's Return" (Machinery mix) – 5:02
3. "Victim of Love" (extended mix) – 6:59
4. "Victim of Love" (dub mix) – 3:26

CD, Mute / CD MUTE 61 (UK)

1. "Safety in Numbers" (recorded live) – 1:28
2. "Victim of Love" – 3:26
3. "The Soldier's Return" (The Return of the Radical Radcliffe mix) – 5:00
4. "Victim of Love" (dub mix) – 3:29
5. "Don't Dance" (recorded live) – 3:53
6. "Leave Me to Bleed" (recorded live) – 3:42
- Track 1 recorded 27 April 1987, Hamburg
- Tracks 5 and 6 recorded 17 April 1987, Brighton Dome

== Charts ==
Chart (1987–1988)	Peak position
Denmark (IFPI)	15
Ireland (IRMA)	7
Switzerland (Schweizer Hitparade)	22
UK Singles (Official Charts Company)	7
US Billboard Hot Dance Club Play	1
US Billboard Hot Dance Music/Maxi-Singles Sales	37
West Germany (Media Control Charts)	26
