= Who Needs Love Like That =

1985 single by Erasure

- Original 1985 single cover

Single by Erasure

from the album Wonderland and Pop! The First 20 Hits
- B-side: "Push Me Shove Me"
- Released: 2 September 1985 (original version); 26 October 1992 (Hamburg Mix)
- Genre: Synth-pop; hi-NRG
- Length: 3:16
- Label: Mute (UK); Sire (US)
- Songwriter: Vince Clarke
- Producer: Flood

Erasure singles chronology
"Who Needs Love Like That" (1985)	"Heavenly Action" (1985)
"Take a Chance on Me" (1992)	"Who Needs Love Like That" (Hamburg Mix) (1992)	"Always" (1994)

Alternative cover
- 1992 remix single cover

Music video
- "Who Needs Love Like That" on YouTube

"Who Needs Love Like That" is the debut single of English synth-pop duo Erasure. The song was released in the UK on Mute Records in 1985 as a prelude to their debut album, Wonderland (1986). The accompanying music video was directed by John Scarlett Davies and produced by Nick Verden for Aldabra. While the original 1985 release enjoyed only minor success, the later "Hamburg Mix" version (issued in 1992 to promote the Pop! compilation) reached the top 10 in Denmark, Greece, Ireland, Israel and the UK.

== History ==
"Who Needs Love Like That" is an uptempo pop song written by Vince Clarke. The lyrics are a cast-off to a destructive love relationship, in which the protagonist asks "who needs love like that?" The music video takes place in a mock Western, with Clarke, Andy Bell and various extras dressed as cowboys. Both Bell and Clarke appear in dual roles, the others being woman's drags.

Upon its release, the song spent two weeks in the UK Singles Chart, peaking at number 55. In 1992, the song was remixed and tacked on to the end of Erasure's greatest hits collection Pop! The First 20 Hits (although in the US it only appears on the cassette release). The "Hamburg Mix" (slightly retitled to put "Like That" in parentheses) was released as a single and became a Top 10 UK hit, peaking at number ten.

== Critical reception ==
In 1986, Robert Hilburn from Los Angeles Times said, "Agreed, Yaz founder Vince Clarke's dance-ready, techno-pop approach was more soulful when Alison Moyet was handling lead vocals, but the percolator-styled beat is still hard to dismiss." Upon the release of the 1992 remix, Music Week wrote, "It was a brilliant introductory single, and its lack of success first time out—it peaked at number 55—is baffling. A straightforward reissue would have been preferable, as the song has very strong melodic verses, which are exorcised completely from the remix, but its dancefloor sensibilities are more than sufficient to ensure it becomes a major success." Steven Wells from NME viewed it as a "catchy little flibbertygibbet". Another NME editor, Ian McCann, noted its "operatic, faintly hysterical vocal, a hissing hi-hat, a disco bassdrum and a bleeping synth." A reviewer from People Magazine stated that Clarke "has not lost his ability to make his music-box synth-sound pulse, as he does in such songs" as "Who Needs Love Like That". Mark Frith from Smash Hits described it as "Human League-esque", giving it two out of five.

== Retrospective response ==
Ned Raggett from AllMusic felt that songs like "Who Needs Love Like That" "aren't quite as strong but work in the general formula quite well regardless". In a 1995 review, Howard Cohen from Knight-Ridder Newspapers described it as "frothy dance". In 2014, Chris Gerard from Metro Weekly wrote that it is "a little simple and raw compared to their later work (and the video is hilariously campy), but it has a classic dance groove and keyboard riff that beams the listener back nearly 30 years, and its hard to play without smiling and singing along". In 2009, Darren Lee from The Quietus stated that the song "bears Yazoo's unmistakeable imprint, with Andy Bell content to mimic Alison Moyet's dulcet vocals".

== Track listings ==
=== Original release (1985) ===
- 7-inch single (MUTE40)
1. "Who Needs Love Like That"
2. "Push Me Shove Me"
- 12-inch single (12MUTE40)
1. "Who Needs Love Like That" (Legend Mix)
2. "Push Me Shove Me" (Extended as Far as Possible Mix)
3. "Who Needs Love Like That" (Instrumental Workout Mix)
- Limited 12-inch single (L12MUTE40)
1. "Who Needs Love Like That" (Mexican Mix)
2. "Push Me Shove Me" (Tacos Mix)
- 12-inch US single (SIRE 0-20404)
1. "Who Needs Love Like That" (The Love That Mix Version / Mexican Mix) – 6:08
2. "Push Me Shove Me" (That Rough and Tumble Mix / Tacos Mix) – 5:46
3. "Heavenly Action" (A Divine Mix / Yellow Brick Mix) – 6:43
4. "Who Needs Love Like That" (Single Edit) – 3:03
- CD single (CDMUTE40)
1. "Who Needs Love Like That"
2. "Push Me Shove Me"
3. "Who Needs Love Like That" (Legend Mix)
4. "Push Me Shove Me" (Extended as Far as Possible Mix)
5. "Who Needs Love Like That" (Instrumental Workout Mix)

=== Hamburg Mix (1992) ===
- 7-inch single (MUTE150) / Cassette single (CMUTE150)
1. "Who Needs Love (Like That)" (Hamburg Mix)
2. "Who Needs Love (Like That)" (Single Edit)
- 12-inch single (12MUTE150)
1. "Who Needs Love (Like That)" (Phil Kelsey Mix)
2. "Ship of Fools" (Orbital Southsea Isles of Holy Beats Mix)
3. "Sometimes" (Danny Rampling Mix)
- CD single (CDMUTE150)
1. "Who Needs Love (Like That)" (Hamburg Mix)
2. "The Soldier's Return"
3. "Don't Say No"
4. "The Circus" (Gladiator Mix)
- Limited CD single (LCDMUTE150)
1. "Who Needs Love (Like That)" (Phil Kelsey Mix)
2. "Ship of Fools" (Orbital Southsea Isles of Holy Beats Mix)
3. "Sometimes" (Danny Rampling Mix)

== Charts ==
=== Original version ===
Chart (1985–1986)	Peak position
Switzerland (Schweizer Hitparade)	23
UK Singles (Official Charts)	55
US Dance Club Songs (Billboard) with "Heavenly Action"	8
US Dance Singles Sales (Billboard) with "Heavenly Action"	13
West Germany (GfK)	48

=== Hamburg Mix ===
==== Weekly charts ====
Chart (1992)	Peak position
Australia (ARIA)	120
Austria (Ö3 Austria Top 40)	18
Denmark (IFPI)	5
Europe (Eurochart Hot 100)	25
Finland (Suomen virallinen lista)	13
Germany (GfK)	27
Greece (Pop + Rock)	9
Ireland (IRMA)	8
Israel (Israeli Singles Chart)	2
Sweden (Sverigetopplistan)	31
UK Singles (Official Charts)	10
UK Airplay (Music Week)	4
UK Club Chart (Music Week)	63

==== Year-end charts ====
Chart (1992)	Position
Israel (Israeli Singles Chart)	47
