= Oh l'amour =

1986 song by Erasure

- Original 1986 single cover

Single by Erasure

from the album Wonderland
- B-side: "March on Down the Line"; "Gimme! Gimme! Gimme! (A Man After Midnight)"
- Released: 21 April 1986 (original version); 13 October 2003 (remix)
- Recorded: 1985
- Genre: Synth-pop; hi-NRG; dance-pop; Eurodisco
- Length: 3:07
- Label: Mute (UK); Sire (US)
- Songwriters: Vince Clarke; Andy Bell
- Producer: Flood

Erasure singles chronology
"Heavenly Action" (1985)	"Oh l'amour" (1986)	"Sometimes" (1986)

Erasure singles chronology
"Make Me Smile (Come Up and See Me)" (2003)	"Oh l'amour" (August Mix) (2003)	"Breathe" (2005)

Alternative cover
- Revised 1986 single cover

Alternative cover
- 2003 remix single cover

Music video
- "Oh l'amour" on YouTube

"Oh l'amour" (French for 'Oh Love') is a song by English synth-pop duo Erasure, released in April 1986 as their third single. Written by Erasure members Vince Clarke and Andy Bell, it is a lament from someone experiencing unrequited love. The song is an uptempo, synth-pop dance track and its popularity was further fueled in dance clubs by the "Funky Sisters Remix", which appeared on the UK 12-inch single and as a bonus track on the US edition of Erasure's debut album, Wonderland (1986).

A different mix of the song was submitted for the single release, adding new instrumentation and extra sounds. This version appears on all of the band's compilation albums. A version of the 12" single was included with early copies of the debut LP Wonderland. One of the B-sides is a cover version of "Gimme! Gimme! Gimme! (A Man After Midnight)", the first time Erasure covered a song from the ABBA songbook. It was issued by Mute Records in the UK and Sire Records in the US to herald the June release of Wonderland, but became the third consecutive commercial failure for the band in both territories. Despite its low chart placement, "Oh l'amour" has proven to be one of Erasure's signature songs, due to its popularity in dance clubs. It remains a favourite among fans, particularly when performed live.

In 2003, the song was remixed and released as a single again to promote the greatest hits package Hits! The Very Best of Erasure. In its remixed form, the song became a UK Top 20 hit, peaking at number 13 in autumn 2003. The original artwork of the "Oh l'amour" single featured illustrations from The Railway Series of characters Percy, Rheneas, Agnes, Ruth, Jemima, Lucy, and Beatrice. As permission had not been given, this cover was withdrawn and replaced with a plain black cover with only the title and band name.

== Critical reception ==
Ned Raggett from AllMusic wrote, "A lovely a cappella opening and instantly catchy hook, not to mention sprightly performances from Clarke and Bell both (the latter wisely undersings rather than pushing the flamboyance, letting loose more on the chorus), ensured its classic status." He also called it "brilliant", noting the "soothing jump" of the song.

Everett True from Melody Maker stated that "it takes some kind of fool genius to create fast songs of the scope and emotional rush" of the "dramatic" "Oh l'amour". Chris Gerard from Metro Weekly complimented it as "the first truly great Erasure single" and "an infectious dance/pop classic". Darren Lee from The Quietus noted the "effete hormonal cravings" of the song, praising it as one of "the most gloriously effervescent pop anthems ever recorded". Richard Cook of Sounds commented that Bell's vocals on the track were like a "skydive into the heart, the very heart of Clarke's splashy, big-cheeked electronics, crisp and shiny as a new apple". He continued, "Clarke somehow hears brighter and quicker than his peers in the old guard of synth-pop, and he sticks to some of his favourite sounds – the bubbly treble line has the same tone of some of his Yazoo tracks."

== Chart performance ==
In 1986, "Oh l'amour" climbed to number 85 on the UK Singles Chart and became Erasure's first big hit in South Africa (number two), West Germany (number 16), Australia (number 13), and their sole hit in France (number 14). In the United States, the song's biggest impact was on the Billboard Hot Dance Music/Club Play chart, where it hit number three on 26 July 1986.

== Track listings ==
=== Original release (1986) ===
- 7" single (MUTE45)
1. "Oh l'amour"
2. "March on Down the Line"
- 12" single (12MUTE45)
1. "Oh l'amour" (12" Mix)
2. "March on Down the Line" (12" Mix)
3. "Gimme! Gimme! Gimme! (A Man After Midnight)"
- Limited 12" single (L12MUTE45)
1. "Oh l'amour" (PWL Funky Sisters Say 'Ooh La La')
2. "Gimme! Gimme! Gimme!" (Remix)
3. "March on Down the Line" (Remix)
- 12" US single (Sire 20488-0)
1. "Oh L'amour" (The Funky Sisters Remix) – 7:12
2. "Gimme! Gimme! Gimme!" (12" Mix) – 4:48
3. "March on Down the Line" – 6:04
- CD single (CDMUTE45)
1. "Oh l'amour" – 3:10
2. "March on Down the Line" – 3:45
3. "Oh l'amour" (Re-mix) – 5:58
4. "March on Down the Line" (Remix) – 6:05
5. "Gimme! Gimme! Gimme! (A Man After Midnight)" – 3:55

=== August Mix (2003) ===
- CD single (CDMUTE312)
1. "Oh l'amour" (August Mix)
2. "Love Me All Night Long"
3. "Nothing Lasts Forever"
- Limited CD single (LCDMUTE312)
1. "Oh l'amour" (LMC Extended Remix)
2. "Oh l'amour" (Shanghai Surprize Remix)
3. "Oh l'amour" (Kenny Hayes Remix)
- DVD single (DVDMUTE312)
1. "Oh l'amour" (Carsten Kroeyer Mix)
2. "Oh l'amour" (Dark Brothers and Andy Bell Mix)
3. "Victim of Love" (video – Live Footage from The Other Tour)
- Download single (iMUTE312)
1. "Oh l'amour" (Markymix) [Mark Towns]

== Charts ==
=== Original release (1986) ===
Chart (1986–1987)	Peak position
Australia (Kent Music Report)	13
France (SNEP)	14
Ireland (IRMA)	17
New Zealand (Recorded Music NZ)	25
Paraguay (UPI)	8
Singapore (Singaporean Singles Chart)	3
South Africa (Springbok Radio)	2
Sweden (Sverigetopplistan)	15
UK Singles (Official Charts)	85
Uruguay (CUD)	4
US Hot Dance Club Play (Billboard)	3
US Hot Dance Music/Maxi-Singles Sales (Billboard)	9
West Germany (GfK Entertainment Charts)	16
Zimbabwe (Zimbabwean Singles Chart)	3

=== Year-end charts ===
Chart (1986)	Position
Australia (Kent Music Report)	75

=== August Mix (2003) ===
Chart (2003)	Peak position
Denmark (Danish Singles Chart)	7
UK Singles (Official Charts Company)	13
US Billboard Hot Dance Singles Sales	10

== Certifications ==
Region	Certification	Certified units/sales
United Kingdom (BPI)	Silver	200,000^{‡}
^{‡} Sales+streaming figures based on certification alone.

== Dollar version ==
"O l'amour"

Single by Dollar
- B-side: "B-Beat"
- Released: 1987
- Genre: Synth-pop
- Length: 3:02
- Label: London
- Songwriters: Vince Clarke; Andy Bell
- Producer: The Extra Beat Boys

Dollar singles chronology
"Haven't We Said Goodbye Before" (1986)	"O l'amour" (1987)	"It's Nature's Way (No Problem)" (1988)

In 1987, British pop duo Dollar released a cover version retitled "O l'amour". Chart-wise, this version was more successful in the UK as it reached No. 7 on the UK Singles Chart, with a total of 11 weeks on the chart, and No. 4 in Ireland. It also reached No. 27 in Germany. The single was the duo's last major hit.

It was sampled by electronic duo Orbital on their track "Style", which appeared on the 1999 album The Middle of Nowhere.

=== Track listing ===
- UK 12" single

A. "O l'amour"
B1. "B-Beat"
B2. "Who Were You With in the Moonlight"

- UK 7" single
1. "O l'amour"
2. "B-Beat"

== Other versions ==
- A Hi-NRG/Eurotrance cover of the song by Spellbound, featuring Deejé, was released in 2000.
- A cover version by DJ Dero, featuring Alejandro Sergi (of the Argentine electropop band Miranda!), was recorded in 2007 and included on the dance music compilation Verano 2008.
- A cover version by Czech singer Petr Muk (alongside cover versions of "Love to Hate You", "Ship of Fools", "Stop!", and "Sometimes", all with Czech lyrics) was included on his EP Oh l'amour, released in 2004.
