= Stay =

Stay may refer to:

== Places ==
- Stay, Kentucky, an unincorporated community in the US

== Law ==
- Stay of execution, a ruling to temporarily suspend the enforcement of a court judgment
- Stay of proceedings, a ruling halting further legal process in a trial

== Structures and mechanics ==
- Stay (mechanics), a structural element designed to resist forces, usually along its axis
- Stay, in a cable-stayed bridge
- Stay, bone (corsetry), one of the rigid parts of a corset
  - Stays, or corset, a garment worn to mold and shape the torso; see History of corsets
- Stays (nautical), heavy ropes, wires, or rods that connect the masts of a sailing vessel to the hull
  - Forestay, on a sailing vessel, keeps a mast from falling backwards
- Boiler stay, an internal structural element of a boiler
- Chain stay and seat stay, parts of a conventional bicycle frame
- Collar stay, a small rigid piece used to maintain the point of a shirt collar
- Guy-wire, or stay, a metal cable used to support a tall structure, such as a radio mast
- Stay cable, used to hold up a weight

== Arts, entertainment, and media ==
=== Films ===
- Stay (2005 film), a psychological thriller directed by Marc Forster
- Stay (2006 film), also known as Sleeping Dogs Lie, a romantic comedy directed by Bobcat Goldthwait
- Stay (2013 film), a Canadian-Irish drama

=== Music ===
==== Albums ====
- Stay (The Controllers album), and the title song, 1986
- Stay (Jeremy Camp album), and the title song (see below), 2002
- Stay (Luca Brasi album), and the title song, 2018
- Stay (Oingo Boingo album), and the title song (see below), 1990
- Stay (Simply Red album), and the title song, 2007
- Stay: Yoake no Soul, by Garnet Crow, 2009
- Stay, by Lory Bianco (recording as Bonnie Bianco), and the title song, 1987
- Stay, by Ray, Goodman & Brown, 1981
- Stay, an EP by the Score, and the title song, 2019

==== Songs ====
- "Stay" (2-4 Family song), 1998
- "Stay" (Anna Odobescu song), representing Moldova at Eurovision 2019
- "Stay" (Ariana Grande song), 2026
- "Stay" (Bernard Butler song), 1998
- "Stay" (Black Stone Cherry song), 2011
- "Stay" (Blackpink song), 2016
- "Stay" (David Bowie song), 1976
- "Stay" (David Guetta song), 2004
- "Stay" (Destine song), 2011
- "Stay" (Elisa song), 2007
- "Stay" (Eternal song), 1993
- "Stay" (Fayray song), 2002
- "Stay" (Fisher song), 2025
- "Stay" (Hebe Tien song), 2018
- "Stay" (Hurts song), 2010
- "Stay" (Jay Sean song), 2008
- "Stay" (Jeremy Camp song), 2002
- "Stay" (Jodeci song), 1991
- "Stay" (The Kid Laroi and Justin Bieber song), 2021
- "Stay" (Kygo song), 2015
- "Stay" (Maurice Williams song), 1960; covered by the Hollies, Four Seasons, Jackson Browne, Dreamhouse, and others
- "Stay" (Monika Linkytė song), representing Lithuania at Eurovision 2023
- "Stay" (Ne-Yo song), 2006
- "Stay" (Nick Jonas & the Administration song), 2010
- "Stay" (No Devotion song), 2014
- "Stay" (Post Malone song), 2018
- "Stay" (Rihanna song), 2012; covered by Adam Lambert, Jonas Brothers, Fatin Shidqia Lubis, Demi Lovato, Patti Smith, and others
- "Stay" (SafetySuit song), 2009
- "Stay" (Sash! song), 1997
- "Stay" (Shakespears Sister song), 1992
- "Stay" (Stephen Gately song), 2001
- "Stay" (Sigma song), 2015
- "Stay" (Stray Kids song), 2026
- "Stay" (Sugarland song), 2007
- "Stay" (Tooji song), 2012
- "Stay" (Zedd and Alessia Cara song), 2017
- "Stay?", by the Rogue Traders, 2003
- "Stay (Faraway, So Close!)", by U2, 1993
- "Stay (I Missed You)", by Lisa Loeb, 1994
- "Stay (Wasting Time)", by Dave Matthews Band, 1998
- "Stay (While the Night Is Still Young)", by Ol' 55, 1997
- "Stay: Now I'm Here", by Dream, 2001
- "Stay", by Agnetha Faltskog from Wrap Your Arms Around Me
- "Stay", by Alison Krauss from Forget About It
- "Stay", by Alkaline Trio from Is This Thing Cursed?
- "Stay", by Alter Bridge from Pawns & Kings
- "Stay", by Ateez from Treasure EP.1: All to Zero
- "Stay", by Atreyu from Baptize
- "Stay", by Banks from Off with Her Head
- "Stay", by Barry Manilow from Barry Live in Britain
- "Stay", by Bellefire from Spin the Wheel
- "Stay", by Belly from Star
- "Stay", by Beulah
- "Stay", by the Blue Nile from A Walk Across the Rooftops
- "Stay", by Brian McKnight from Back at One
- "Stay", by BTS from Be
- "Stay", by Cher Lloyd from Sticks + Stones album
- "Stay", by Coldrain from Fateless
- "Stay", by Cradle of Filth from Thornography
- "Stay", by the Crash from Pony Ride (The Crash album)
- "Stay", by Cueshé from Half Empty Half Full
- "Stay", by Daryl Ong, the opening theme from the television series On the Wings of Love
- "Stay", by Dave Gahan from Paper Monsters
- "Stay", by Delta Goodrem, B-side of "Love... Thy Will Be Done"
- "Stay", by Destiny's Child from The Writing's on the Wall
- "Stay", by Down to Earth Approach from the compilation A Santa Cause: It's a Punk Rock Christmas
- "Stay", by EXO from Universe
- "Stay", by Florida Georgia Line from Here's to the Good Times
- "Stay", by Gavin DeGraw from Free
- "Stay", by Giant from Time to Burn
- "Stay", by Goldfinger from Goldfinger
- "Stay", by Gregori Lukas
- "Stay", by Hans Zimmer from the Interstellar film soundtrack
- "Stay", by Hillsong Music Australia from By Your Side
- "Stay", by Jimmy Needham from Clear the Stage
- "Stay", by Jimmy Somerville from Home Again
- "Stay", by Joy Williams from Genesis
- "Stay", by Little Big Town from Little Big Town
- "Stay", by Madonna from Like a Virgin
- "Stay", by Marcella Detroit from The Vehicle
- "Stay", by Mayday Parade from Mayday Parade
- "Stay", by Miley Cyrus from Can't Be Tamed
- "Stay", by Moka Only from Carrots and Eggs
- "Stay", by No Devotion from Permanence
- "Stay", by Oingo Boingo from Dead Man's Party
- "Stay", by Palaye Royale from The Bastards
- "Stay", by Pink Floyd from Obscured by Clouds
- "Stay", by Poets of the Fall from Signs of Life
- "Stay", by Prism from Small Change
- "Stay", by Robbie Seay Band from Give Yourself Away
- "Stay", by Ronan Keating from Winter Songs
- "Stay", by Rufus featuring Chaka Khan from Street Player
- "Stay", by Sara Bareilles from Once Upon Another Time
- "Stay", by Saves the Day from Under the Boards
- "Stay", by Simply Red from Stay
- "Stay", by Steve Angello from Wild Youth
- "Stay", by Steve Grand from All-American Boy
- "Stay", by the Tragically Hip from Music @ Work
- "Stay", by Toni Braxton from Pulse
- "Stay", by Two Steps from Hell from Miracles
- "Stay", by Tyrese
- "Stay", by Victoria Justice
- "Stay", by Vixen from Tangerine
- "Stay", by the Waifs from Sun Dirt Water
- "Stay", by Wendy and Lisa from Wendy and Lisa
- "Stay", by Why Don't We from The Good Times and the Bad Ones
- "Stay", by Will Oldham (recorded as Bonnie 'Prince' Billy)
- "Stay", composed by Ernest Gold and Norman Gimbel for the 1969 film The Secret of Santa Vittoria
- "Stay (The Black Rose and the Universal Wheel)", by OMD from The Pacific Age
- "Stay (Ven a Mi)", by Il Divo from Wicked Game

==== Other uses in music ====
- STAY, the fandom name for the K-pop group Stray Kids

=== Other uses in arts, entertainment, and media ===
- "Stay" (Friday Night Lights), an episode of the TV series Friday Night Lights
- "Stay" (Haven), an episode of Haven
- Stay (novel), a 2002 crime novel by Nicola Griffith
- Stay (sculptures), two artworks in Christchurch, New Zealand

== See also ==
- Demi Lovato: Stay Strong, a 2012 documentary film about Demi Lovato
- Let's Stay Together (disambiguation)
- "Let's Stay Together Tonight", a song by Air Supply, from The Book of Love
- Stay Awake (disambiguation)
- "Stay Stay Stay", a song by Taylor Swift, from Red
- Stay the Night (disambiguation)
- Stay with Me (disambiguation)
- Stay with The Hollies, a 1964 album by The Hollies
