= Oh Well (Ariana Grande song) =

Song by Ariana Grande

from the album Petal
- Released: July 31, 2026
- Genre: UK garage; drum and bass; Eurodisco
- Length: 3:16
- Label: Babydoll; Republic
- Composers: Ariana Grande; Ilya Salmanzadeh
- Lyricist: Ariana Grande
- Producers: Ariana Grande; Ilya Salmanzadeh

Visualizer
- "Oh Well" on YouTube

"Oh Well" (stylized in all lowercase) is a song by American singer and songwriter Ariana Grande, from her eighth studio album, Petal. A UK garage, drum and bass, and Eurodisco song, it became available as the album's fifth track on July 31, 2026, via Babydoll Music and Republic Records.

== Background and promotion ==
Grande recorded "Oh Well" for her eighth studio album, Petal (2026), which she co-wrote and executive produced with the Iranian-Swedish producer Ilya Salmanzadeh. Grande began teasing the album in April 2026 through a series of social media posts and studio images, before announcing Petal and its cover artwork on April 28, 2026. The album's lead single, "Hate That I Made You Love Me", was released on May 29, debuting atop the charts in the United States and United Kingdom.

Grande revealed parts of the album's tracklist through pre-show concert visuals at Crypto.com Arena in Los Angeles, where "Kiss Me" and the title track, "Petal", were unveiled as the first and third tracks, respectively. The remaining tracks, including "Oh Well", were unveiled on June 19. On July 8, Grande posted an a cappella snippet of "Oh Well" and "Freak", as well as the Petal alternative picture disc reveal. In the video's caption are a portion of the song's lyrics: "Good things can replace dysfunction, obsession / Thanks but I'll see you right out / Good luck on your way to hell / Oh well."

== Composition and commercial performance ==
"Oh Well" is a UK garage, drum and bass, and Eurodisco song. It depicts Grande coming to terms with the end of a toxic relationship, as she rejects responsibility for the subject's emotions and embraces moving on. Throughout the chorus, she declares that "the bad guys all go to hell", while the lyrics have also been interpreted as addressing either a former lover or Grande's relationship with the media.

"Oh Well" was one of five Petal tracks to chart in the top ten of the Billboard Global 200 upon release, opening at number eight. It debuted at number 23 on the US Billboard Hot 100.

== Personnel ==
The credits are adapted from Tidal.

- Ariana Grande – lead vocals, background vocals, songwriter, producer, vocal producer, recording arranger, engineer
- Ilya Salmanzadeh – songwriter, producer, bass, drum kit, guitar, keyboard, programmer, mixing engineer, vocal producer, engineer
- Juan Arguello – mixing, engineer, second engineer
- Lou Carrao – engineer
- Davide Rossi – cello, viola, violin, string arranger, string producer
- Randy Merrill – mastering engineer

== Charts ==
Chart performance
Chart (2026)	Peak position
France (SNEP)	108
Global 200 (Billboard)	8
Portugal (AFP)	47
US Billboard Hot 100	23
