= Like I Do (Ariana Grande song) =

Song by Ariana Grande

from the album Petal
- Released: July 31, 2026
- Genre: R&B; pop
- Length: 2:47
- Label: Babydoll; Republic
- Composers: Ariana Grande; Ilya Salmanzadeh
- Lyricist: Ariana Grande
- Producers: Ariana Grande; Ilya Salmanzadeh

Visualizer
- "Like I Do" on YouTube

"Like I Do" (stylized in all lowercase) is a song by American singer and songwriter Ariana Grande, from her eighth studio album, Petal. The song became available as the album's ninth track on July 31, 2026. Co-written by Grande and Ilya Salmanzadeh, the R&B and pop song addresses media scrutiny, fame, and public perception while presenting Grande as defiant and irreplaceable. It was first performed live during the Montreal stop of Grande's Eternal Sunshine Tour on July 30, 2026, several hours before the album's release.

== Background and promotion ==
Grande recorded "Like I Do" for her eighth studio album, Petal (2026), which she co-wrote and executive produced with the Iranian-Swedish producer Ilya Salmanzadeh. Grande began teasing the album in April 2026 through a series of social media posts and studio images, before announcing Petal and its cover artwork on April 28, 2026. The album's lead single, "Hate That I Made You Love Me", was released on May 29, debuting atop the charts in the United States and United Kingdom.

Grande revealed parts of the album's tracklist through pre-show concert visuals at Crypto.com Arena in Los Angeles, where "Kiss Me" and the title track, "Petal", were unveiled as the first and third tracks, respectively. The remaining tracks, including "Like I Do", were unveiled on June 19.

== Composition ==
Over an R&B production featuring sharp, distorted synthesizers and heavy basslines, "Like I Do" addresses media scrutiny and public criticism, with Grande presenting herself as irreplaceable despite persistent headlines and commentary about her personal life. The chorus references the historic newspaper cry "extra, extra" as a nod to tabloid coverage, while the lyrics also juxtapose professional confidence with sexual bravado. The pop song also portrays Grande as being in control of the relationship, which asserts that those who criticize or dismiss her remain unable to move on and continue to follow her actions.

== Live performance ==
Grande premiered "Like I Do" during the second of three concerts at Montreal's Bell Centre on July 30, 2026, as part of her Eternal Sunshine Tour, several hours before the release of Petal. The performance was included in one of Petal's exclusive digital editions, subtitled Hello, Me Again.. I Love to Sing Some More.

== Personnel ==
The credits are adapted from Tidal.

- Ariana Grande – lead vocals, background vocals, production, vocal production, arrangement, engineering
- Ilya Salmanzadeh – production, background vocals, bass, drums, guitar, keyboards, programming, vocal production, arrangement, mixing engineering, engineering
- Juan Arguello – engineering, mixing, second engineering
- Lou Carrao – engineering
- Randy Merrill – mastering

== Charts ==
Chart performance
Chart (2026)	Peak position
Australia (ARIA)	22
Canada Hot 100 (Billboard)	25
France (SNEP)	78
Global 200 (Billboard)	11
Greece International (IFPI)	27
Lithuania (AGATA)	99
New Zealand (Recorded Music NZ)	24
Poland (Polish Streaming Top 100)	96
Portugal (AFP)	39
Singapore (Billboard)	17
Sweden Heatseeker (Sverigetopplistan)	9
UK Singles (Official Charts)	48
US Billboard Hot 100	24
