= Stay with You =

Stay with You may refer to:

== Songs ==
- "Stay with You" (Goo Goo Dolls song), 2006
- "Stay with You" (Lemon Jelly song), 2004
- "Stay with You", song by John Legend from Get Lifted
- "Stay with You", song by Cade and Cheat Codes
- "Stay with You", song by Russell Morris from A Thousand Suns
- "Stay with You", song by Mike Posner and Avicii

== See also ==
- I'll Stay with You (film), a 1931 German romantic comedy film directed by Johannes Meyer
- Stay with Me (disambiguation)
