= The Eternal Sunshine Tour =

2026 concert tour by Ariana Grande

- Tour by Ariana Grande
- Promotional poster
- Location: Canada; England; U.S.
- Associated album: Eternal Sunshine (Note: Reissued in 2025 with the subtitle Brighter Days Ahead)
- Start date: June 6, 2026
- End date: September 1, 2026
- No. of shows: 41
- Producer: Live Nation
- Attendance: 638,000
- Box office: $107.9 million

Ariana Grande concert chronology
- Sweetener World Tour (2019); The Eternal Sunshine Tour (2026)

The Eternal Sunshine Tour was the fifth concert tour and fourth arena tour by the American singer Ariana Grande, in support of her seventh studio album, Eternal Sunshine (2024), and its 2025 reissue, subtitled Brighter Days Ahead. The tour commenced on June 6, 2026, at Oakland Arena in Oakland, United States, and concluded on September 1 of the same year at the O_{2} Arena in London, England. It featured 41 shows.

== Background and development ==
In March 2024, Ariana Grande released her seventh studio album, Eternal Sunshine. Four months later, during an interview on the Shut Up Evan podcast, she said that she planned a "mini sampling of shows" supporting the album, adding that it would be "a really lovely idea to be able to trickle in some shows" between the releases of Wicked (2024) and Wicked: For Good (2025).

Speculation arose in December on an announcement of a concert tour for the following year; Grande's label, Republic Records, denied the rumors, stating that there were "no plans" for her to tour. During an interview with Variety that month, Grande stated that, although "music and being on stage will always be a part of [her] life", she would not be touring "anytime soon", prioritizing acting for "the next few years".

In July 2025, Grande teased potential shows for 2026 on social media, writing: "I plan to sing for you all next year. Even if its just for a little." At the end of August, Grande teased the tour on social media with a video that referenced her musical short film Brighter Days Ahead (2025). Live Nation Entertainment announced the tour a day later. The tour incorporated songs from the album's 2025 reissue, also subtitled Brighter Days Ahead, as well as tracks from her sixth and eighth albums, Positions (2020) and Petal (2026); songs from Petal were gradually added to the setlist in the shows held following that album's release on July 31, 2026.

In November 2025, Grande confirmed that the tour would be "one last hurrah... for now", as she intends to take an indefinite hiatus from the music industry to focus on acting and theatre.

== Production ==
Grande and her long-time collaborator, Christian Breslauer, directed the tour, which features references to The Wizard of Oz (1939) and continues the narrative established in Brighter Days Ahead. The staging of the tour further alludes to Brighter Days Ahead by including the house featured in the film.

=== Fashion and styling ===
On May 14, 2026, Law Roach revealed during an interview with The Hollywood Reporter that he would be styling the outfits for the tour. He previously styled the outfits for the Dangerous Woman Tour (2017) and the Sweetener World Tour (2019). Six custom costumes were designed for the concert by designers Givenchy by Sarah Burton, Christian Louboutin, Alexander McQueen, and Vivienne Westwood, among others. Following the tour's opening night, Roach spoke to Vogue and explained that the designs were selected based on Grande's decision regarding the set list. He described everything as "scores for a movie", emphasizing that they wanted the clothing to reflect that concept.

== Concert synopsis ==
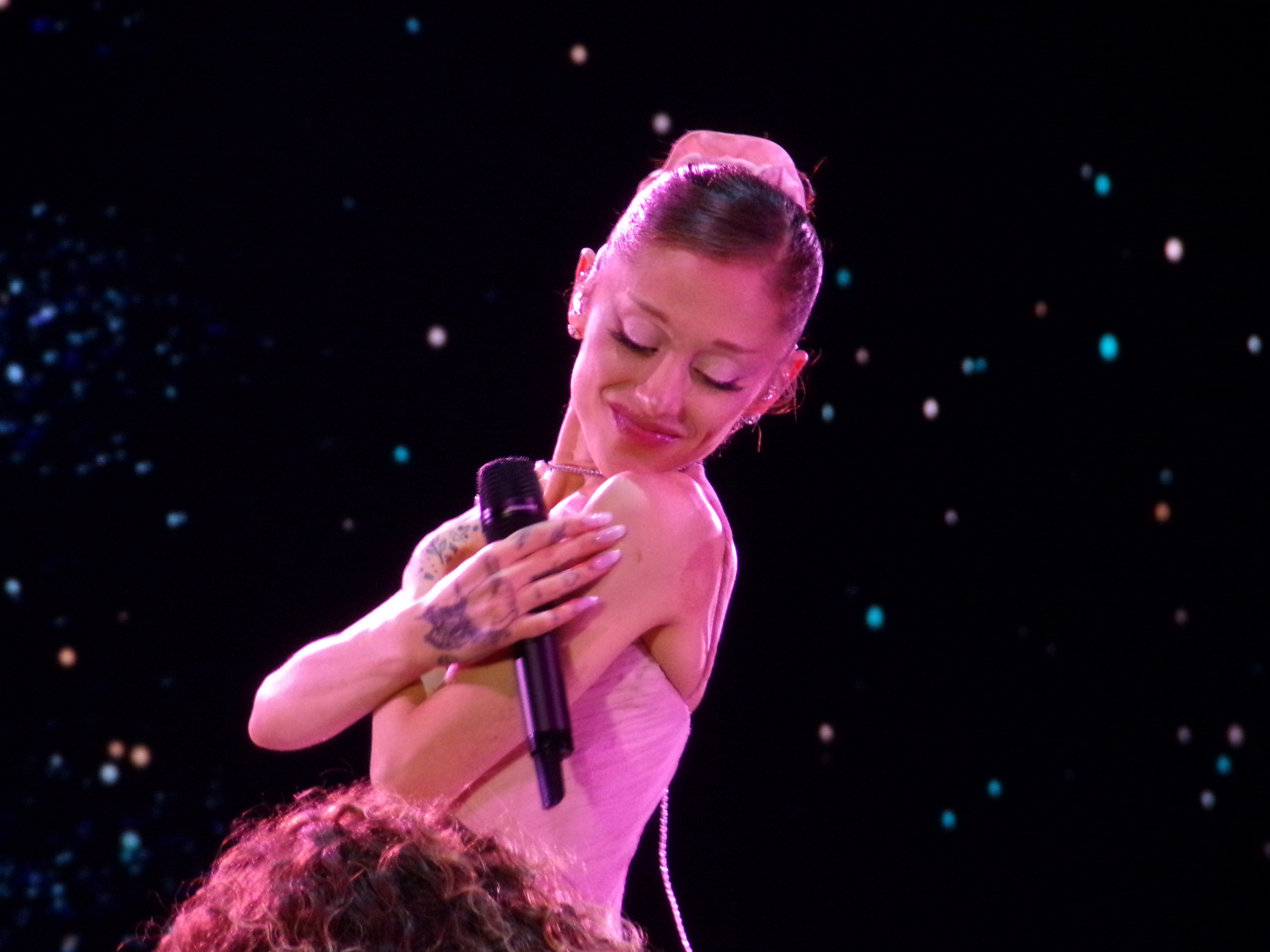
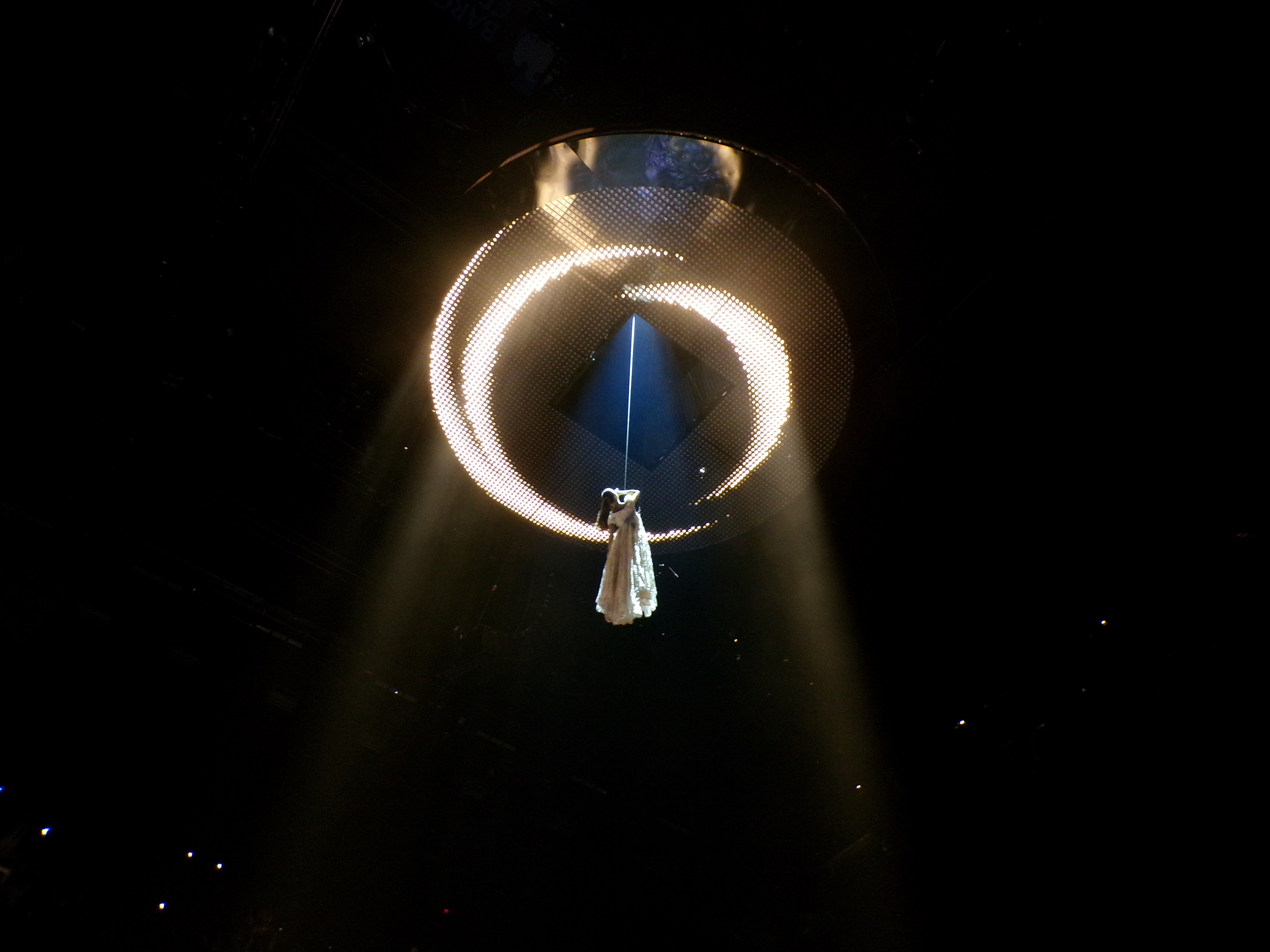
Top: Grande performing during the show's second act. Bottom: Grande closes the show as she is lifted by a harness from the stage up towards a UFO-like structure, recalling an alien abduction scene from Brighter Days Ahead (2025).

Each concert runs for around two hours and is divided into five acts. The stage design is centered around a destroyed house, seen throughout the promotional visuals for Eternal Sunshine, which becomes overgrown with flowers as the concert progresses. Multiple screens onstage also broadcast video interludes in between acts. These interludes continue the narrative established by the Brighter Days Ahead short film, in which Grande plays Peaches, a character who wants to erase her memories due to a traumatic past. The set list consists mostly of tracks from Eternal Sunshine and Brighter Days Ahead, as well as two to three songs from Grande's previous studio albums, excluding Sweetener (2018), and one from her eighth album, Petal.

The concert opens with a video intro that shows Peaches in her home as she brushes her teeth. Water begins to flood her surroundings, forcing her to flee. Upon leaving the house, she sees a vision of her past self midway through a memory-erasing procedure in the Brighter Days Clinic. The video ends, and Grande appears onstage in a lacy black dress to perform "Yes, And?", "Positions", and "Dandelion". For the latter two songs, large flames are projected on the runway screen and the screen behind the house backdrop. Police sirens blare from the speakers to introduce the first act's final song, "The Boy Is Mine". During the performance, Grande, now wearing a Catwoman-inspired cat mask, thrashes a whip and does a seductive dance with one of the backup dancers.

The next act's interlude features Peaches falling down a deep, dark hole. As she does, several hands revealed to be Grande's reach out to her. After "Saturn Returns Interlude" plays over the speakers and the visual ends, Grande enters from the B-stage in a pale pink gown and a hair bun. She then asks the crowd for a moment of silence. Using an onstage looping station, she constructs a vocal loop in real time to recreate the intro of "Eternal Sunshine". Once she is done layering and harmonizing her vocals, she transitions to a full performance of the song. Grande follows it up with "Just Like Magic", "Thank U, Next" and "7 Rings"; the A-stage and house backdrop are lit in a hot pink color during the latter two. Grande performs "Thank U, Next" seated on a couch by the backdrop, struts down the catwalk for "7 Rings", and tosses her hair after a backup dancer undoes her bun into a long ponytail. Jem Aswad of Variety interpreted the lattermost move as a nod to the hair toss scene in Wicked.

For the interlude preceding the third act, an unconscious Peaches is woken up by her younger self on a flowery grassland. The two then sit on a swing set and get acquainted; the young girl asks Peaches if she "comes here often" and Peaches replies, "No, actually." After the interlude, the house is revealed to be overgrown with greenery, and Grande appears in its upstairs bedroom for "Imperfect for You". She follows the song with "Warm", "Safety Net", "One Last Time", and "Rain on Me". To conclude the third act, Grande performs "Break Free"; as she does, the stage lights flash the colors of the rainbow.

The fourth act's interlude sees Peaches and her younger self watching The Wizard of Oz. The two walk down the flooded halls of the Brighter Days Clinic, witnessing three past versions of Grande having their memories erased. One of them wears the outfit for One Love Manchester, the benefit concert Grande organized following a terrorist attack that killed 22 people during a Manchester show for the Dangerous Woman Tour in 2017. Younger Peaches goes into one of the rooms and closes the door. Grande goes on stage for "Twilight Zone", improvises various high notes for "Past Life" and "Dangerous Woman", performs a jazz-inspired version of "Honeymoon Avenue", and closes the fourth act with "Hampstead" while seated on a stool at the end of the catwalk. After she leaves the stage, two dancers appear and perform a ballet routine set to the "Hampstead" instrumental.

In the fifth act's interlude, Peaches rushes to the version of herself prior to the memory wipe to stop the procedure. Her first attempts at getting the computer to cancel it fail; left with no other choice, she smashes the computer and ends the procedure for good. The screen then broadcasts footage of Grande backstage preparing her final act costume, styled by Law Roach. Smoke emanates from the stage once she enters the stage with her dancers for "Into You", after which the dancers leave. Grande performs "Hate That I Made You Love Me", ending the main concert.

For the encore, Grande returns to the main stage to perform "We Can't Be Friends (Wait for Your Love)" as pink clouds are displayed on the stage screens. She closes the show with "Supernatural", heading towards the B-stage with her backup dancers as the song progresses. She is gradually lifted by a harness up the stage towards a UFO-like structure as a beam of light shines towards her, recalling an alien abduction scene from the Brighter Days Ahead film. The final interlude depicts Peaches, who has reconciled with her past and present, sitting alongside her younger and older selves. "Ordinary Things" plays during the end credits.

== Critical reception ==
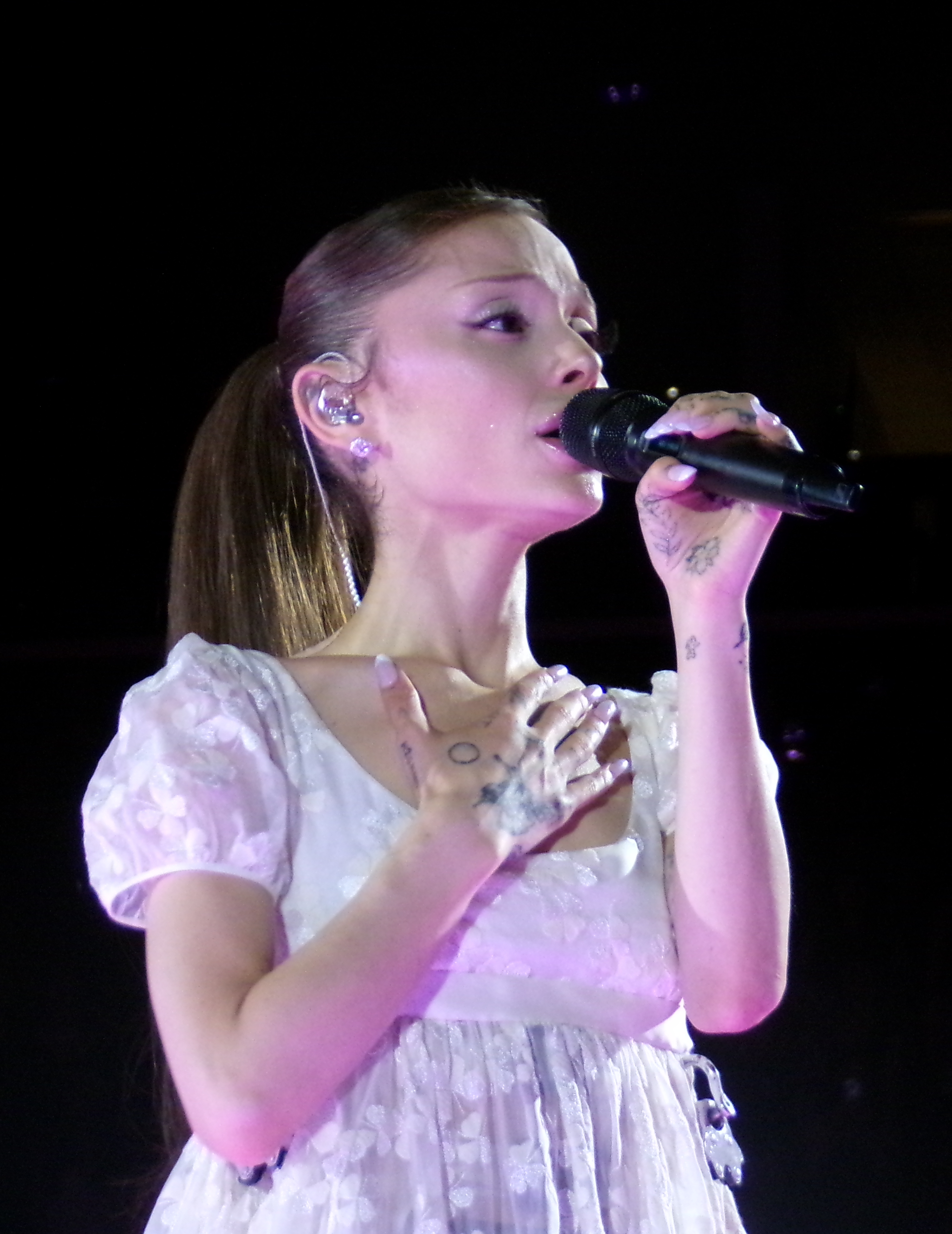
Grande performing in New York City on July 18, 2026

The tour received overwhelmingly positive reviews from music critics, who praised the show's cinematic staging, exceptional showmanship, storytelling, and Grande's powerhouse vocals. Billboard's Lyndsey Havens described Grande's opening night as "more special than ever". Havens further praised the concert's storytelling and Grande's humor as one of the best moments of the night. In a review for USA Today, Melissa Ruggieri described the concert's production as "lavish" and felt the tour was a "well-earned victory lap" and a "welcome homecoming" for Grande. Larisha Paul of Rolling Stone liked Grande's choice to craft a "pointed" set list, which they felt created "an essential conversation between herself and her fans". Mikael Wood from the Los Angeles Times commended Grande's high vocal register and Broadway-influenced belting, her ability to create unusual, visually memorable moments, and the intimacy and emotional quality of the performances. Variety's Chris Willman highlighted Grande's captivating return to the stage, blending emotional depth and connection with her fans. Vogue writer Christian Allaire emphasized the show's cinematic, era-spanning production, and custom wardrobe. In a review for Boston.com, Samantha Genzer praised Grande's live vocal looping and precision as "a standout moment". She also noted that "her voice remained remarkably consistent" while frequently extending tracks past their original runtimes.

Numerous critics gave the Eternal Sunshine Tour total five-out-of-five star ratings. Paula Mejía of The Guardian wrote that Grande's "first tour in seven years brought the house down with emotive ballads and clubby bangers delivered with saucy wit". The Daily Telegraph writer Eleanor Halls noted that "Grande displays courage in a performance that takes you on a cosmic journey through her psychological universe". Nick Levine of NME praised the show as "brilliant business-as-usual" and hailed Grande's abilities as both "a performer and pop conceptualist". The Times's Yasmin Choudhury called the show "dazzling", highlighting Grande's status as one of pop's most formidable vocalists through "two relentless hours of impossible highs". Danni Scott from Metro described the show "cool, collected and surprisingly vulnerable", while pointing out the "emotional cracks in [Grande's] popstar armour". Callum Wells from Attitude wrote that "Seven years is a long time to stay away from a live stage, but it was easy to see why the wait had been worth it". Gennaro Costanzo, writing for Schön!, lauded Grande's performance for its emotional depth and refusal to be defined by a single era. Mark Savage from BBC gave the show widespread critical acclaim, highlighting the conceptual narrative on memory and fame and calling the show a "powerhouse pop spectacle". He also praised Grande's extraordinary vocal rage, describing her riffs as "so tremendously colossal they should be registered as the eighth wonder of the world". Clash's Sabrina Soormally wrote that Grande is "[c]ementing her place as a generational pop voice".

== Commercial performance ==
Tickets for the Eternal Sunshine Tour sold out rapidly amid high demand. However, fans expressed widespread disappointment over technical issues and inflated resale prices on the resale market such as Stub Hub, Viagogo, TickPick, and Vivid Seats: resale tickets for the Los Angeles shows ranged between $780 to over $7,000. Ticketmaster and SeatGeek crashed during the pre-sale, and fans reported experiencing long queues and technical glitches on these and other official ticketing platforms, which prevented them from purchasing tickets at face value pricing. Fans also criticized Grande and Live Nation for booking arenas, arguing Grande's seven-year touring hiatus and the demand from her large fan base would have been better accommodated by larger venues such as stadiums.

Grande released a statement addressing the high prices on the resale market, stating that "it's not right" and she is "incredibly bothered", urging ticket sellers to sell at face value. She also opted out of dynamic pricing, setting ticket prices to prioritize affordability. Following the events, Ticketmaster and Live Nation were sued by the United States Federal Trade Commission (FTC), accused of bait-and-switch price advertising, using junk fees, and enabling ticket brokers to harvest tickets in violation of Ticketmaster purchase limits to sell them at marked-up prices on the company's own resale platform. In January 2026, Ticketmaster announced that canceled tickets (from scalper violations) would be getting reissued directly to real fans via a request process in February.

Pre-sales for the North American leg began on September 9, 2025. Six million users vied for tickets, including one million in Oakland and the Los Angeles area. New York City and Austin drew 230,000 to 300,000 people, respectively. Grande scheduled nine additional dates in response to the high demand. Tickets for the North American leg were sold out within minutes during both the presale and general sales periods. Pre-sales for Grande's shows at the O_{2} Arena in London were held on September 16, attracting two million possible buyers. Five new shows at the venue were announced during the original pre-sale bringing a total of 10 shows to the UK. The London shows were met with huge commercial success, with all tickets being sold in 15 minutes.

== Philanthropy and activism ==
In June 2026, Grande launched the Brighter Days Ahead Foundation, a non-profit organization, focused on the LGBTQ community, youth mental health, arts education, civil rights and community support causes. Grande uses the tour as the foundation's inaugural public activation, and primary platform to promote it. Throughout the trek, the foundation highlighted national and localized grassroot non-profit organizations at each tour stop, splitting a portion of dedicated ticket and merchandise sales with regional grantees. She also applied her philanatrohpy internally by partnering with the non-profit Backline, to provide her tour travelling crew, dancers, and band members with financial grants, counseling access, and wellness packages, alongside financing a 24/7 mental health crisis line (B-LINE) for music industry workers.

Additionally during the UK leg of the tour, she also made a partnership with the regional charities, and international NGO's, including Save the Children UK, to support displaced families and children affected in Gaza, delivering critical health, nutrition, and emergency education services.

== Set list ==
This set list is from the June 6, 2026, concert in Oakland. It does not represent all concerts for the duration of the tour.

Act I

1. "Yes, And?"
2. "Positions"
3. "Dandelion"
4. "The Boy Is Mine"

Act II

5. "Eternal Sunshine"
6. "Just Like Magic"
7. "Thank U, Next"
8. "7 Rings"

Act III

9. "Imperfect for You"
10. "Warm"
11. "Safety Net"
12. "One Last Time"
13. "Rain on Me"
14. "Break Free"

Act IV

15. "Twilight Zone"
16. "Past Life"
17. "Dangerous Woman"
18. "Honeymoon Avenue"
19. "Hampstead"

Act V

20. "Into You"
21. "Hate That I Made You Love Me"
22. "We Can't Be Friends (Wait for Your Love)"
23. "Supernatural"

=== Alterations ===
- During the July 19 show in New York City, "Be Alright" was performed a cappella during the fourth act due to a technical difficulty.
- During the July 25 show in Boston, "Sweetener" was performed a cappella succeeding "Honeymoon Avenue".
- During the July 26 show in Boston, "34+35" was performed a cappella succeeding "Honeymoon Avenue".
- During the July 28 show in Montreal, "Worst Behavior" was performed a cappella succeeding "Honeymoon Avenue", and "Petal" was added to the fifth act.
- During the July 30 show in Montreal, "Sometimes" was performed a cappella succeeding "Honeymoon Avenue", and "Like I Do" was performed succeeding "Petal".
- During the July 31 show in Montreal, "Stay" and "Oh Well" were performed succeeding "Petal".
- During the August 3 show in Chicago, "Big Feelings" and "Never Get Over Me" were performed succeeding "Petal".
- During the August 5 show in Chicago, "Like I Do" and "Stay" were performed succeeding "Petal".
- During the August 6 show in Chicago, "Oh Well" and "Like I Do" were performed succeeding "Petal".
- During the August 15 show in London, "Kiss Me" and "Bad Thing (Bunny Hop)" were performed preceding "Petal".
- During the August 16 show in London, "For Good" and "Get Happy" / "Happy Days Are Here Again" (Note: Medley arrangement originally performed by Barbra Streisand and Judy Garland on the October 6, 1963, episode of The Judy Garland Show.) were performed with Cynthia Erivo.
- Beginning with the August 19 show in London, "Petal" was moved to the fourth act, succeeding "Dangerous Woman".
- During the August 20, 24, and 27 shows in London, "Like I Do" was performed during the fourth act.
- During the August 31 show in London, "Freak", "Warning Signs (interlude)", and "Like I Do" were performed during the fourth act, succeeding "Dangerous Woman".
- During the September 1 show in London, "Kiss Me", "Oh Well", "Nowhere, Nobody", and "Like I Do" were performed during the fourth act, succeeding "Dangerous Woman".

=== Notes ===
- During the July 16 show in New York City, Ty Dolla Sign joined Grande on stage to perform "Safety Net".
- A recording of Dolly Parton's "I Will Always Love You" (1974) was played as part of the pre-show for the August 27 show in London, as a tribute to Parton following her death two days prior.

== Tour dates ==
List of 2026 concerts
Date (2026)	City	Country	Venue	Attendance	Revenue
June 6	Oakland	United States	Oakland Arena	173,100 (Note: For all 12 shows in June. The three shows in Inglewood drew a crowd of 45,100.)	$31,200,000 (Note: For all 12 shows in June. The three shows in Inglewood got the revenue of $8,300,000.)
June 9	Oakland	United States	Oakland Arena	173,100	$31,200,000
June 10	Oakland	United States	Oakland Arena	173,100	$31,200,000
June 13	Los Angeles	United States	Crypto.com Arena	173,100	$31,200,000
June 14	Los Angeles	United States	Crypto.com Arena	173,100	$31,200,000
June 17	Inglewood (Note: Labeled as Los Angeles in promotional material)	United States	Kia Forum	173,100	$31,200,000
June 19	Inglewood	United States	Kia Forum	173,100	$31,200,000
June 20	Inglewood	United States	Kia Forum	173,100	$31,200,000
June 24	Austin	United States	Moody Center	173,100	$31,200,000
June 26	Austin	United States	Moody Center	173,100	$31,200,000
June 27	Austin	United States	Moody Center	173,100	$31,200,000
June 30	Sunrise	United States	Amerant Bank Arena	173,100	$31,200,000
July 2	Sunrise	United States	Amerant Bank Arena	29,900	$4,800,000
July 3	Sunrise	United States	Amerant Bank Arena	29,900	$4,800,000
July 6	Atlanta	United States	State Farm Arena	209,000 (Note: For all 14 shows in July. The five shows in New York City drew a crowd of 75,400.)	$35,900,000 (Note: For all 14 shows in July. The five shows in New York City got the revenue of $13,500,000.)
July 8	Atlanta	United States	State Farm Arena	209,000	$35,900,000
July 9	Atlanta	United States	State Farm Arena	209,000	$35,900,000
July 13	New York City (Note: Labeled as Brooklyn in promotional material)	United States	Barclays Center	209,000	$35,900,000
July 14 (Note: The July 14, 2026, concert was originally scheduled for July 12, but was postponed due to production issues.)	New York City	United States	Barclays Center	209,000	$35,900,000
July 16	New York City	United States	Barclays Center	209,000	$35,900,000
July 18	New York City	United States	Barclays Center	209,000	$35,900,000
July 19	New York City	United States	Barclays Center	209,000	$35,900,000
July 23 (Note: The July 23 and 26, 2026, concerts were originally scheduled for July 22 and 24, respectively, but were postponed due to production issues.)	Boston	United States	TD Garden	209,000	$35,900,000
July 25	Boston	United States	TD Garden	209,000	$35,900,000
July 26	Boston	United States	TD Garden	209,000	$35,900,000
July 28	Montreal	Canada	Bell Centre	209,000	$35,900,000
July 30	Montreal	Canada	Bell Centre	209,000	$35,900,000
July 31	Montreal	Canada	Bell Centre	209,000	$35,900,000
August 3	Chicago	United States	United Center	47,000	$8,300,000
August 5	Chicago	United States	United Center	47,000	$8,300,000
August 6	Chicago	United States	United Center	47,000	$8,300,000
August 15	London	England	The O_{2} Arena	179,000	$27,700,000
August 16	London	England	The O_{2} Arena	179,000	$27,700,000
August 19	London	England	The O_{2} Arena	179,000	$27,700,000
August 20	London	England	The O_{2} Arena	179,000	$27,700,000
August 23	London	England	The O_{2} Arena	179,000	$27,700,000
August 24	London	England	The O_{2} Arena	179,000	$27,700,000
August 27	London	England	The O_{2} Arena	179,000	$27,700,000
August 28	London	England	The O_{2} Arena	179,000	$27,700,000
August 31	London	England	The O_{2} Arena	179,000	$27,700,000
September 1	London	England	The O_{2} Arena	179,000	$27,700,000
Total				638,000	$107,900,000
