= Stay (Ariana Grande song) =

Song by Ariana Grande

from the album Petal
- Released: July 31, 2026
- Genre: Pop
- Length: 2:28
- Label: Babydoll; Republic
- Composers: Ariana Grande; Ilya Salmanzadeh; Max Martin
- Lyricist: Ariana Grande
- Producers: Ariana Grande; Ilya Salmanzadeh; Max Martin

Visualizer
- "Stay" on YouTube

"Stay" (stylized in all lowercase) is a song by American singer and songwriter Ariana Grande from her eighth studio album, Petal. A pop ballad, it was released by Babydoll Music and Republic Records as the album's fourth track on July 31, 2026.

== Background and promotion ==
Grande recorded "Stay" for her eighth studio album, Petal (2026), which she co-wrote and executive produced with the Iranian-Swedish producer Ilya Salmanzadeh. Grande began teasing the album in April 2026 through a series of social media posts and studio images, before announcing Petal and its cover artwork on April 28, 2026. The album's lead single, "Hate That I Made You Love Me", was released on May 29, debuting atop the charts in the United States and United Kingdom.

Grande revealed parts of the album's tracklist through pre-show concert visuals at the Crypto.com Arena in Los Angeles, where "Kiss Me" and the title track, "Petal", were unveiled as the first and third tracks, respectively. The remaining tracks, including "Stay", were unveiled on June 19. Grande performed the song during the Eternal Sunshine Tour in Montreal and Chicago on July 31 and August 5, respectively. The former performance was included in one of Petal's exclusive digital editions, subtitled Hello, I Love to Sing.

== Composition and commercial performance ==
"Stay" is a pop ballad with lyrics about feeling safe after rekindling a past relationship. It features xylophone-like synthesizers and a 1980s-inspired drum pattern in its production. "Stay" was one of five Petal tracks to chart in the top ten of the Billboard Global 200 upon release, opening at number seven. It debuted at number 22 on the US Billboard Hot 100.

== Charts ==
Chart performance
Chart (2026)	Peak position
France (SNEP)	101
Global 200 (Billboard)	7
Hong Kong (Billboard)	25
Portugal (AFP)	46
US Billboard Hot 100	22
