= Like I Do =

Like I Do may refer to:

- "Like I Do" (Ariana Grande song), 2026
- "Like I Do" (Christina Aguilera song), 2018
- "Like I Do" (David Guetta, Martin Garrix and Brooks song), 2018
- "Like I Do" (For Real song), 1996
- "Like I Do" (Nancy Sinatra song), 1962; covered by Maureen Evans, 1962
- "(Ain't Nobody Loves You) Like I Do", a song by La Toya Jackson, 1987
- "Like I Do", a song by Minipop from the 2007 album A New Hope
- "Like I Do", a song by Tate McRae from the 2025 album So Close to What
