= Stay Together =

Stay Together may refer to:

- "Stay Together" (Suede song), 1994
- "Stay Together" (Barbara Tucker song), 1995
- "Stay Together" (Mandaryna song), 2006
- "Stay Together" (Noah Cyrus song), 2017
- "Stay Together", a song by 2NE1 from 2NE1
- "Stay Together", a song by Lauv from All 4 Nothing
- "Stay Together", a song by N.E.R.D. from In Search of...
- Stay Together (album), a 2016 album by Kaiser Chiefs

== See also ==
- Let's Stay Together (disambiguation)
