= Fingers & Thumbs (Cold Summer's Day) =

1995 single by Erasure

Single by Erasure

from the album Erasure
- B-side: "Hi NRG"
- Released: 27 November 1995
- Genre: Synth-pop; dance
- Length: 6:44 (album version); 4:23 (single edit)
- Label: Mute (UK); Elektra (US)
- Songwriters: Vince Clarke; Andy Bell
- Producers: Thomas Fehlmann; Gareth Jones

Erasure singles chronology
"Stay with Me" (1995)	"Fingers & Thumbs (Cold Summer's Day)" (1995)	"Rock Me Gently" (1996)

Music video
- "Fingers & Thumbs (Cold Summer's Day)" on YouTube

"Fingers & Thumbs (Cold Summer's Day)" is a song by English synth-pop duo Erasure. It originally appeared on the soundtrack to the documentary film Wigstock: the Movie, as "Cold Summer's Day". The duo re-recorded it for their seventh studio album, Erasure (1995), with new lyrics. Composed by Vince Clarke and Andy Bell, it is an uptempo dance track. The album version is over six minutes long; the single edit removes an extended instrumental section between the second and third choruses.

The song was released as the second single from the album by Mute Records in the UK and Elektra Records in the United States. The track subsequently became Erasure's 22nd consecutive top-20 hit on the UK Singles Chart. In Germany, it stalled at number 69, while in the United States, it was a hit on the Billboard Hot Dance Music/Club Play chart, peaking at number 10. The single's B-side is a cover version of "High Energy" (retitled "Hi NRG") by American singer Evelyn Thomas.

== Critical reception ==
Paul Gorman from Music Week wrote, "Initially harking back to a more familiar ground, Clarke and Bell deliver a higly [sic?] hummable four-on-the-floor putdown which transmutes into an epic of scorn." Robert. I. Doerschuk from Musician felt the chorus of 'Fingers & Thumbs' "could have worked well with a Hooked On Four Tops arrangement of 'It's the Same Old Song'." Ben Willmott from NME said the song is "the same old dreary Erasure with Eurovision drums and hooks as blunt as Frank Bruno's sense of humour, with a few spacy bits."

== Music video ==
A music video (directed by Max Abbiss Biro) was produced to accompany the single, featuring Bell singing the song as he walks through an amusement park against the story backdrop of a group of friends carrying an urn on a mission to scatter a late friend's ashes. The actual filming was done in the London Docklands.

== Track listings ==
- CD1 (CDMUTE178)
1. "Fingers & Thumbs (Cold Summer's Day)" (single mix)
2. "Hi NRG"
3. "Fingers & Thumbs (Cold Summer's Day)" (Twilight 0.2)
4. "Fingers & Thumbs (Cold Summer's Day)" (Figures in Crumbs) (a collaboration with Wir)
- CD2 (LCDMUTE178)
1. "Fingers & Thumbs (Cold Summer's Day)" (Tin Tin Out remix)
2. "Fingers & Thumbs (Cold Summer's Day)" (Dub on the Moon)
3. "Fingers & Thumbs (Cold Summer's Day)" (Electrofinger)
4. "Fingers & Thumbs (Cold Summer's Day)" (Twilight Plus)
- 12-inch single (12MUTE178)
1. "Fingers & Thumbs (Cold Summer's Day)" (Tin Tin Out remix)
2. "Fingers & Thumbs (Cold Summer's Day)" (Tin Tin Out instrumental)
3. "Fingers & Thumbs (Cold Summer's Day)" (Dub on the Moon)
4. "Fingers & Thumbs (Cold Summer's Day)" (Twilight Plus)
- Cassette single (CMUTE178)
1. "Fingers & Thumbs (Cold Summer's Day)" (single mix)
2. "Hi NRG"

== Charts ==
Chart (1995–1996)	Peak position
Australia (ARIA)	198
Canada Dance/Urban (RPM)	17
Croatia (HRT)	22
Europe (European Hit Radio)	38
Germany (GfK)	69
Israel (Israeli Singles Chart)	14
Scottish Singles Sales (Official Charts)	23
UK Singles (Official Charts)	20
UK Club Chart (Music Week)	26
US Dance Club Songs (Billboard)	10
US Dance Singles Sales (Billboard)	27
