= Kiss Me (Ariana Grande song) =

Song by Ariana Grande

from the album Petal
- Released: July 31, 2026
- Genre: Synth-pop; R&B
- Length: 3:39
- Label: Babydoll; Republic
- Composers: Ariana Grande; Ilya Salmanzadeh
- Lyricist: Ariana Grande
- Producers: Ariana Grande; Ilya Salmanzadeh

Visualizer
- "Kiss Me" on YouTube

"Kiss Me" (stylized in all lowercase) is a song by American singer and songwriter Ariana Grande, from her eighth studio album, Petal. A synth-pop and R&B song, it became available as the album's opener on July 31, 2026, via Babydoll Music and Republic Records.

== Background and promotion ==
Grande recorded "Kiss Me" for her eighth studio album, Petal (2026), which she co-wrote and executive produced with the Iranian-Swedish producer Ilya Salmanzadeh. Grande began teasing the album in April 2026 through a series of social media posts and studio images, before announcing Petal and its cover artwork on April 28, 2026.

At a concert held at Crypto.com Arena in Los Angeles, pre-show visuals displayed the title of the opening track, "Kiss Me", marking the first track of Petal to be revealed. Grande performed the song live for the first time during the Eternal Sunshine Tour on August 15 in London. She reprised it on the final night of the tour.

== Composition ==
With elements of electronic drums, "Kiss Me" is a synth-pop and R&B track that begins with soothing synths before shifting into a more electric, dance-oriented sound marked by electric guitar and a record-scratch effect. The song explores feelings of isolation and not belonging, with intimacy presented as a source of comfort and security.

== Commercial performance ==
"Kiss Me" was one of five Petal tracks to chart in the top ten of the Billboard Global 200 upon release, opening at number five. In the United States, it entered the Billboard Hot 100 at number 21. It was expected to debut at number six on the UK singles chart but eventually reached number 15. The song also peaked within the top 20 in Australia, Ireland, and New Zealand.

== Charts ==
Chart performance
Chart (2026)	Peak position
Argentina Anglo Airplay (Monitor Latino)	12
Australia (ARIA)	12
France (SNEP)	63
Global 200 (Billboard)	5
Hong Kong (Billboard)	23
Ireland (IRMA)	19
Latvia Airplay (LaIPA)	17
Netherlands (Single Top 100)	52
New Zealand (Recorded Music NZ)	11
Norway (VG-lista)	69
Portugal (AFP)	34
Switzerland (Schweizer Hitparade)	44
UK Singles (Official Charts)	15
US Billboard Hot 100	21
