= Dangerous Woman (song) =

2016 single by Ariana Grande

- Physical single cover, also used for the Japanese deluxe edition of the album.

Single by Ariana Grande

from the album Dangerous Woman
- Released: March 11, 2016
- Recorded: January 2016
- Studio: MXM (Stockholm, Sweden)
- Genre: Pop; R&B; retro-soul; rock
- Length: 3:55
- Label: Republic
- Songwriters: Johan Carlsson; Ross Golan; Max Martin
- Producers: Max Martin; Johan Carlsson

Ariana Grande singles chronology
"Over and Over Again" (2016)	"Dangerous Woman" (2016)	"Into You" (2016)

Music video
- "Dangerous Woman" on YouTube

"Dangerous Woman" is a song by American singer-songwriter Ariana Grande. It was released on March 11, 2016 by Republic Records as the lead single from her third studio album of the same name (2016). It was written by Johan Carlsson, Ross Golan, and Max Martin, produced by Martin and Carlsson. "Dangerous Woman" is a mid-tempo pop, R&B, and retro-soul song.

With "Dangerous Woman" debuting at number ten on the US Billboard Hot 100, Grande became the first artist to reach the top ten of the chart in the opening charting week with every lead single of her first three studio albums. Furthermore, the song became her fifth single to debut within the top ten in the United States, later peaking at number eight in its eleventh week. It also reached the top ten in Canada and Lebanon. It was nominated for Best Pop Solo Performance at the 59th Annual Grammy Awards.

== Background and release ==
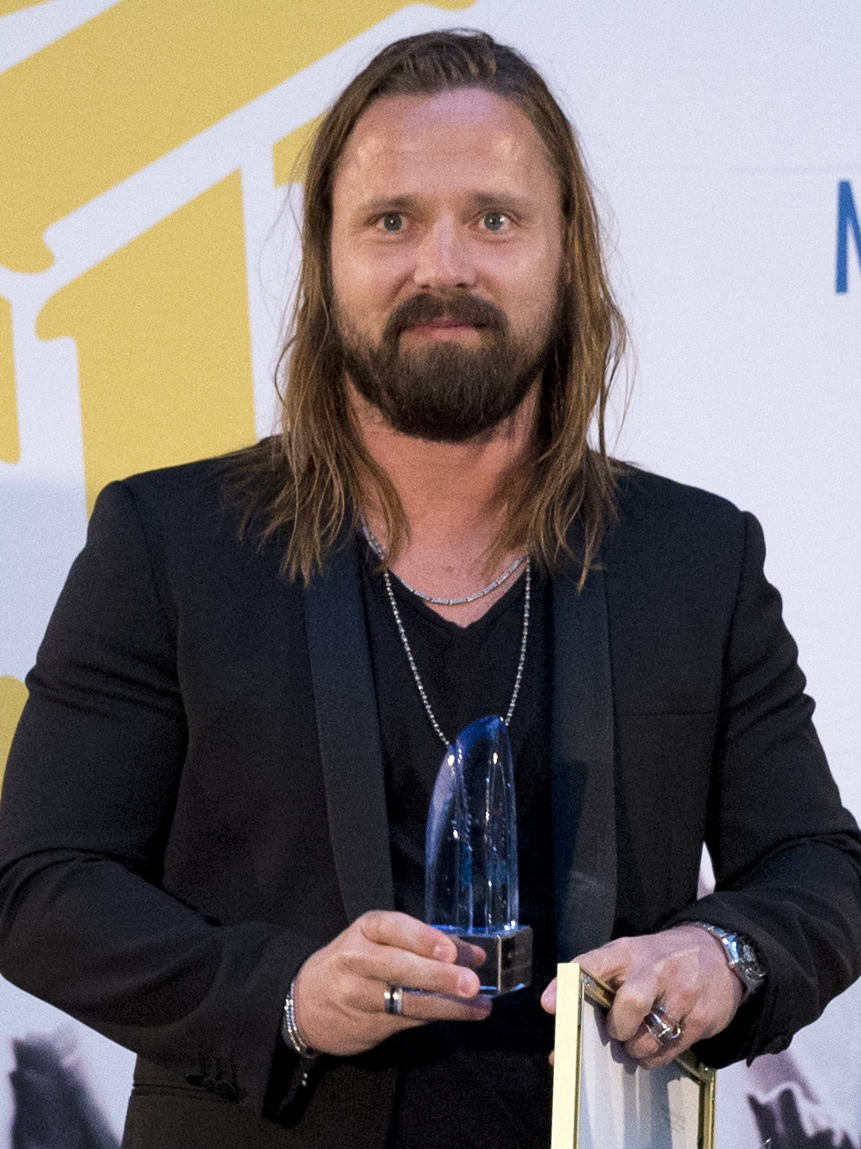
Max Martin (pictured) produced "Dangerous Woman".

In October 2015, Grande released "Focus" as the intended lead single from her third studio album, titled Moonlight at the time. Positioned by Grande as the perfect transition from her previous record to the new one, the song debuted in the top ten on various charts worldwide but received a mixed reception from critics, who felt it was too similar to her 2014 hit "Problem". Grande ended up changing the album's title to Dangerous Woman, with the title track as its new lead single. On February 25, 2016, Grande launched a website titled dangerouswoman.com to promote the album and single. Later, on March 1, 2016, she released the first preview of the song, containing few of the recording's lyrics and some "studio chatter". On March 10, 2016, Grande premiered a one-minute preview during CBS' Victoria's Secret Swim Special, before finally releasing "Dangerous Woman" for digital download the next day. Four days later, the track was sent to United States contemporary hit radio.

"Dangerous Woman" was written and produced by Johan Carlsson and Max Martin, with additional writing from Ross Golan. In an interview with CBS This Morning, Golan revealed that the song was originally written with Carrie Underwood in mind, and was also pitched to Alicia Keys and Rihanna. It was ultimately given to Grande because Golan felt she really cared for the songwriters and would do the song justice. Carlsson performed guitar, piano, synths, tambourine and handled the production and programming with Max Martin who also contributed with vocal production. It was recorded at MXM Studios in Stockholm, Sweden. The song was mixed by Serban Ghenea at MixStar Studios in Virginia Beach, Virginia. The audio mastering was handled by Tom Coyne and Aya Merrill at Sterling Sound in New York City.

== Composition and lyrics ==
"Dangerous Woman"
A 24-second sample of "Dangerous Woman", a mid-tempo pop and R&B song that lyrically, revolves around a theme of empowerment and sensuality. The song received positive reviews from critics who praised its composition comparing to the Weeknd's Earned It.

Musically, "Dangerous Woman" is a midtempo slow-jam pop, retro-soul and R&B song, with strong influences of rock music. It was described by Brennan Carley from Spin as a "woozy, big-band piece of moody R&B, one that falls neatly at the intersection of bubblegum and rock and roll". The song is written in the key of E minor, while its tempo swings at a rate of 67 beats per minute in a compound duple 6/8 time. Grande's vocal range spans from D_{3} to B_{5}. Various publications compared the track's vibe to The Weeknd's "Earned It". The song has a typical verse-pre-chorus-chorus structure; it begins with a chord progression of E_{m}–G–C. The opening verses are accompanied by guitar chords and slow beats, which is followed by her belting in the pre-chorus. A guitar solo is present during the song's bridge. Although not officially credited as a composer for the music, American singer Charlie Puth can be heard beatboxing in the background of the track. Puth declared Carlsson added his beatboxing in order to achieve a higher frequency on the snare drum.

"'Dangerous Woman' is about choice, empowerment, strength and romance. As a person, as a character, as a persona. 'Dangerous Woman' is a fearless, honest, no bulls— superhuman, and I think all of us have her inside of us and it's just a matter of when we decide to let her out."

— Grande talking about the song

The arena rock chorus consists of the line, "Somethin' 'bout you makes me feel like a dangerous woman", with Grande repeating the phrase's beginning at the end of each line. The refrain is backed by distorted synths and the guitar riff present during the first verse. Following the second chorus, Grande sings the hook, "All girls wanna be like that/Bad girls underneath, like that/You know how I'm feeling inside" accompanied by an electronic riff reminiscent of trap music. The outro of the song features down-pitched, vocoder-processed vocals repeating the line "Yeah, there's somethin' 'bout you, boy" layered with Grande's vocals echoing the same line in her typical vocal style.

A reviewer from Sputnikmusic noted that the track's lyrics are "a cross between sexually charged and fully empowering." Commenting about the lyrical content of "Dangerous Woman", Grande stated: "This song is about an empowered woman who meets another person that brings out a different side of her. It's her decision to put her fears aside and explore these new feelings. It's about letting someone into your life in an intimate and vulnerable way and not letting that take away from your independence and strength."

== Critical reception ==
Carolyn Menyes of Music Times complimented the song's time signature for adding "a bit of a waltz flavor, channeling the old school Ariana that fans first fell in love with", adding that "a sultry, distorted guitar line and Grande's passionate, soaring vocals add a sense of texture and modernity that makes 'Dangerous Woman' feel as powerful as the title." A writer of NME felt that Grande "shows herself as someone who continues to be determined to challenge the norm." The publication as well pointed out that "[the song] does sound empowered, even if it doesn't sound especially dangerous for her in the wake of her 2014 collaboration 'Love Me Harder' with The Weeknd." Lewis Corner from Digital Spy praised Grande's vocals, describing as "angelic" and completed writing it "almost sound too pure over the seductive guitar line and prowling beat, which threatens to blindfold you and tie up your wrists within one listen.". Reviewing the album with the same name, the editor from Sputnikmusic described the song as "the first moment that the album really shows flashes of becoming something special," and continued, "as it sways to a seductive beat that feels like it was extrapolated from the most revealing scene of a James Bond film." Quinn Maryland of Pitchfork shared similar opinion, the reviewer described it as "a slinky, empowered, Bond theme of a belter;"

Brennan Carley of Spin opined that "without a doubt, the most mature piece of music she's released to date. [...] The song is smart, sexy, captivating, and sung to total perfection." Tufayel Ahmed from Newsweek as well praised the song's maturity. Vulture's Sean Fitz-Gerald expressed that "Dangerous Woman" "flaunts the pop star's vocal control, starting out as a seductive whisper and slowly swelling into a heavy, swaying ear worm". Writing for AXS, Lucas Villa compared the song to The Weeknd's 2014 single "Earned It", saying that Grande "embrace[s] her grown woman side." He also added that "Ariana's powerful pipes take femme fatale to a whole new level." Maeve McDermott of USA Today considered it "her own version of a slinky Bond theme", while Jessie Morris of Complex called it "enchanting". Ailbhe Malone from the Irish Times described the recording as "slinky and sexy, but tongue-in-cheek too. Imagine it as part of a Spotify playlist with Selena Gomez's 'Hands to Myself' and you're on the right track." Rolling Stone wrote that "the thrush-size diva with the five-alarm vocal power knocks out a sumptuously bluesy ode to her own awesomely lethal ladyhood." The magazine also named "Dangerous Woman" one of the thirty best songs of the first half of 2016: "This sultry, clever, bluesy stalk is full of unlikely patterns and pitch jumps, not to mention a guitar solo that explodes into Nintendo pixels and a vocodered outro. But for all its unique filigrees, there's an unstoppable chorus for one of pop's most pyrotechnic voices."

== Commercial performance ==
In the United States, "Dangerous Woman" debuted at number ten on the Billboard Hot 100 issue dated April 2, 2016, selling 118,000 digital downloads in its opening week. It also debuted on the Digital Songs chart at number two. The recording became Grande's seventh top ten on the chart, and her second after "Focus" to enter the region unaccompanied by another artist. That week, Grande set a record for debuting within the opening ten positions of the chart with every lead single—"The Way" and "Problem"—of her first three studio albums, a feat which has since been expanded to all eight of her studio albums as of 2026. The single fell to number 13 in its second week, but gradually rebounded, eventually reaching its peak position at number eight in its eleventh week. "Dangerous Woman" spent twenty weeks in the Hot 100's top forty, dropping to the closing positions starting with August 8, 2016. As of June 2020, the song has sold 1,150,000 copies in the country.

"Dangerous Woman" debuted at number 24 on Australia's ARIA Charts on the week ending March 27, 2016; it went on to reach number 18 on April 10, 2016, becoming her seventh top twenty single there. The song spent 13 weeks on the chart. It was certified 4× Platinum by the Australian Recording Industry Association (ARIA) in 2023, for exceeding the 280,000 equivalent units limit. In New Zealand, the song peaked at number 16 on the New Zealand Singles Chart, being as well certified Platinum. In the United Kingdom, "Dangerous Woman" debuted and peaked at number 17 on the UK Singles Chart, marking Grande's fifth top twenty single in that territory after "Focus". Additionally, the recording gained a Platinum certification offered by the British Phonographic Industry (BPI) for selling 600,000 units.

== Live performances ==
Grande provided her first televised performance of "Dangerous Woman" when she served as both host and musical guest on the March 12, 2016 episode of Saturday Night Live along with "Be Alright". She also sang the track as a special guest for Nicki Minaj's concert at the T-Mobile Arena on April 8, 2016, and performed the single at the 2016 MTV Movie Awards with Jason Robert Brown, the Tony-winning composer behind Grande's Broadway debut in the musical 13 in 2008. Grande also performed "Dangerous Woman" at The Voice season 10 finale alongside Christina Aguilera. The song was included on the setlist for Grande's 2017 Dangerous Woman Tour as a closing song. It was also performed on Grande's 2019 Sweetener World Tour and 2026 Eternal Sunshine Tour.

== Music video ==
=== A capella video ===
On March 20, 2016, Grande uploaded a video of the song to YouTube. The video shows Grande performing the entire song a capella in front of a beige background while wearing the latex bunny outfit shown on the album cover. At the end of the performance, the crew watching off-camera applaud wildly. The video has received over 130 million views.

=== Official video ===
For "Dangerous Woman", Grande planned to shoot two different versions of the music video. Grande previewed what became the sole accompanying music video for the single through social media on March 26, 2016, and March 29, 2016. The clip was officially premiered on Vevo in the night of March 31, 2016. Directed by production company The Young Astronauts, in an interview with Idolator, Grande explained: “We’re doing two visuals because this song makes me feel two kinds of ways, it makes me feel sexy and glamorous — I wanted to do a simpler more glam-themed video — and then I wanted to do another video because it makes me feel... like a super version of myself in a way.” Discussing the song with Madeline Rotj from MTV, Grande stated about the concept behind the song's second video:

“This one's more cinematic and weird and tells a story. It's very different from the first one. I wanted to do a sexy, simple, more glamorous video, which was visual one. And then the second one is very different... it's very weird.”

The video opens with a vignette that presented the video as "visual 1". Sporting black lingerie, Grande is seen posing and singing in front of a curtain and on a bed. Shades of blue, purple and pink wash over her over the course of the video, which is just the singer on her own. Though she keeps a fairly stoic expression for the majority of the video, she is seen laughing towards the end as the screen fills with static. The video surpassed 100 million views on May 18, 2016, making it Grande's tenth VEVO-certified music video after "Right There" (2013). As of December 2025, the video has more than 760 million views on YouTube.

=== Cancellation of Visual 2 ===
Grande initially planned to release two music videos for the song because it made her feel two different emotions, for which she felt two videos are needed to portray. She later confirmed that Visual 2 had been cancelled on her Twitter and Snapchat accounts. In a Q&A with fans, Grande later explained that the cancellation of Visual 2 was because she didn't have time. Further explanation on the cancellation came when a fan asked Grande about the video on Twitter on January 13, 2019. Grande responded to the fan, saying the video was a mess due to the visual effects not being realistic enough and that she didn't want to give her fans anything that is less than they deserve. Grande also revealed part of the concept for the video, saying "I like peeled my skin off my face and the dw mask was underneath." The mask she was referring to was the mask featured in the album's artwork and packaging. "It was ambitious for the time allotted to work on it lol. and also insane"

== Credits and personnel ==
Credits adapted from the liner notes of Dangerous Woman.

Recording and management

- Recorded at MXM Studios (Stockholm, Sweden)
- Mixed at MixStar Studios (Virginia Beach, Virginia)
- Mastered at Sterling Sound (New York City)
- Published by MXM – administered by Kobalt — (ASCAP), Warner-Tamerlane Publishing Corp. (BMI) and Back in Djbouti (BMI)
- All rights administered by Warner-Tamerlane Publishing Corp. and MXM – administered by Kobalt — (ASCAP)

Personnel

- Ariana Grande – lead vocals, background vocals, vocal production(all tracks)
- Johan Carlsson – songwriting, production, vocal production, guitar, acoustic guitar, piano, synths, programming, tambourine, guitar solo
- Max Martin – songwriting, production, vocal production, programming
- Ross Golan – songwriting, background vocals
- Charlie Puth – beatbox
- Serban Ghenea – mixing
- John Hanes – mixing engineering
- Sam Holland – engineering
- Cory Bice – engineering
- Peter Karlsson – engineering
- Tom Coyne – mastering
- Aya Merrill – mastering
- Wendy Goldstein – artists and repertoire
- Scooter Braun – artists and repertoire

== Charts ==
=== Weekly charts ===
Chart (2016)	Peak position
Australia (ARIA)	18
Austria (Ö3 Austria Top 40)	21
Belgium (Ultratop 50 Flanders)	31
Belgium (Ultratop 50 Wallonia)	33
Canada Hot 100 (Billboard)	10
Canada AC (Billboard)	40
Canada CHR/Top 40 (Billboard)	7
Canada Hot AC (Billboard)	24
Czech Republic Airplay (ČNS IFPI)	23
Czech Republic Singles Digital (ČNS IFPI)	15
Denmark (Tracklisten)	31
Europe (Euro Digital Songs)	17
Finland Download (Latauslista)	10
France (SNEP)	36
Germany (GfK)	30
Greece Digital Songs (Billboard)	1
Hungary (Single Top 40)	29
Hungary (Stream Top 40)	17
Ireland (IRMA)	24
Italy (FIMI)	19
Japan Hot 100 (Billboard)	73
Netherlands (Dutch Top 40)	14
Netherlands (Single Top 100)	21
Lebanon (Lebanese Top 20)	9
New Zealand (Recorded Music NZ)	16
Norway (VG-lista)	27
Poland Airplay (ZPAV)	59
Portugal (AFP)	15
Scottish Singles Sales (Official Charts)	7
Slovakia Airplay (ČNS IFPI)	53
Slovakia Singles Digital (ČNS IFPI)	17
South Korea International Chart (Gaon)	13
Spain (Promusicae)	51
Sweden (Sverigetopplistan)	30
Switzerland (Schweizer Hitparade)	23
UK Singles (Official Charts)	17
US Billboard Hot 100	8
US Adult Pop Airplay (Billboard)	19
US Dance Airplay (Billboard)	20
US Pop Airplay (Billboard)	4
US Rhythmic Airplay (Billboard)	10
Venezuela English (Record Report)	24

=== Year-end charts ===
Chart (2016)	Position
Australia (ARIA)	77
Canada (Canadian Hot 100)	41
Italy (FIMI)	93
Netherlands (Dutch Top 40)	96
UK Singles (Official Charts Company)	69
US Billboard Hot 100	36
US Mainstream Top 40 (Billboard)	21
US Rhythmic Songs (Billboard)	50

== Certifications ==
Certifications for "Dangerous Woman"
Region	Certification	Certified units/sales
Australia (ARIA)	4× Platinum	280,000^{‡}
Austria (IFPI Austria)	Platinum	30,000^{‡}
Belgium (BRMA)	Gold	10,000^{‡}
Brazil (Pro-Música Brasil)	2× Diamond	500,000^{‡}
Canada (Music Canada)	6× Platinum	480,000^{‡}
Denmark (IFPI Danmark)	Platinum	90,000^{‡}
France (SNEP)	Gold	66,666^{‡}
Germany (BVMI)	Gold	200,000^{‡}
Hungary (MAHASZ)	Gold	1,500^{‡}
Italy (FIMI)	Platinum	50,000^{‡}
New Zealand (RMNZ)	3× Platinum	90,000^{‡}
Norway (IFPI Norway)	Platinum	60,000^{‡}
Poland (ZPAV)	2× Platinum	40,000^{‡}
Portugal (AFP)	Platinum	10,000^{‡}
Spain (Promusicae)	Platinum	60,000^{‡}
Switzerland (IFPI Switzerland)	Gold	15,000^{‡}
United Kingdom (BPI)	2× Platinum	1,200,000^{‡}
United States (RIAA)	6× Platinum	6,000,000^{‡}
Streaming
Sweden (GLF)	2× Platinum	16,000,000^{†}
^{‡} Sales+streaming figures based on certification alone.^{†} Streaming-only figures based on certification alone.

== Release history ==
"Dangerous Woman" release history
Region	Date	Format(s)	Label	Ref.
Various	March 11, 2016	Digital download	Republic	
Italy	March 11, 2016	Radio airplay	Universal	
United States	March 15, 2016	Contemporary hit radio; rhythmic contemporary radio	Republic	
