= Let's Stick Together (disambiguation) =

Let's Stick Together is a 1976 album by Bryan Ferry.

Let's Stick Together may also refer to:

- "Let's Stick Together" (film), a 1952 Donald Duck cartoon
- "Let's Stick Together" (song), a 1962 song by Wilbert Harrison, covered by others

== See also ==
- Let's Stay Together (disambiguation)
