= Rock Me Gently (Erasure song) =

Single by Erasure

from the album Erasure
- B-side: "Chertsey Endlos"
- Released: 12 February 1996
- Recorded: 1995
- Genre: Synth-pop
- Length: 4:04 (single version); 10:02 (album version)
- Label: Mute
- Songwriters: Vince Clarke; Andy Bell
- Producers: Thomas Fehlmann; Gareth Jones

Erasure singles chronology
"Fingers & Thumbs (Cold Summer's Day)" (1995)	"Rock Me Gently" (1996)	"In My Arms" (1997)

Music video
- "Rock Me Gently" on YouTube

"Rock Me Gently"
A 23 second sample of "Rock Me Gently" where the Galás performs her free form vocals over the ambient soundscape of the breakdown.

"Rock Me Gently" is a song by English synth-pop duo Erasure. It was written by group members Vince Clarke and Andy Bell, and appears on their seventh studio album, Erasure (1995). Mute Records released it in February 1996 as a single in selected European countries, including Germany and Czech Republic. It was not released in the UK or the US. In its album form, the song is an extended, ten-plus minutes mid-tempo synth ballad with ambient elements and a free-form vocal performance by American singer Diamanda Galás, during the song's breakdown. Bell's lead vocals were accentuated by the London Community Gospel Choir, who sang background (as they did on previous Erasure single "Stay with Me"). "Rock Me Gently" was significantly altered for its single release, adding a radio-friendly drum track to the mix and editing out most of the Galás interlude. An extended version of this mix was included on the CD single, retaining the Galás section while keeping the new instrumentation.

== Critical reception ==
Ned Raggett from AllMusic noted the "gentle shimmer" of the song, adding that Diamanda Galas "delivers haunting solo turns". In his review of Erasure, Steve Baltin from Cash Box felt that particularly the "soothing" ten-minute track, finds Erasure displaying its softer side." Caroline Sullivan from The Guardian found that songs like the "adventurous" "Rock Me Gently" "are made interesting by the whale-noise vocals of Diamanda Galas, whose services should be retained for the next album." Chris Gerard from Metro Weekly stated, "It's a perfect ballad, performed with incredible sweetness by Bell over Vince Clarke's gorgeous keyboard lines. It's one of the duo's most sublime recordings". Music Week wrote, "Full choral backing and ambient textures provide the album's most adventurous moments, which feature the unique vocals of Diamanda Galas."

Paul Moody from NME said, "Starting off as a candy-coloured rush of electronics around Andy's lovesick vocal it drifts off into ambient tranceville and threatens never to come back. A storm appears to break out deep in hyper-space; an opera singer trills somewhere to the left to Saturn, then a drum machine whirrs and the song bleeps dreamily back to life. It's like a ten-minute electro-pop equivalent of Flatliners." A reviewer from People Magazine commented, "Thanks to an emphasis on gorgeous torch tunes like 'Rock Me Gently' and 'Stay with Me', lead singer Andy Bell's always operatic vocals take on a newfound luster". Darren Lee from The Quietus felt it "remain [a] serviceable enough" ballad, "but lack the pizzazz and charm of earlier releases." Troy J. Augusto from Variety declared it as "a sweet ballad".

== Music video ==
A black-and-white music video was produced to promote the single, features Bell singing a duet with a Marilyn Monroe look-alike. It was directed by Max Abbiss-Biro and later made available on Erasure's official YouTube channel in 2014.

== Track listings ==
- Czech 12" single (12NEMY4)
1. "Rock Me Gently" (Phil Kelsey Mix)
2. "Chertsey Endlos"
3. "Rock Me Gently" (A Combination of Special Events)
4. "Rock Me Gently" (Bamboo)
- Czech CD single (CDNEMY4)
1. "Rock Me Gently" (Single Mix)
2. "Rock Me Gently" (A Combination of Special Events)
3. "Rock Me Gently" (Phil Kelsey Mix)
4. "Rock Me Gently" (Bamboo)
5. "Rock Me Gently" (Extended)
6. "Chertsey Endlos"
- German CD single (CDMUTE180)
1. "Rock Me Gently" (Single Mix)
2. "Chertsey Endlos"
3. "Sono Luminus" (Live)
4. "Rock Me Gently" (Out of the Moon)

== Charts ==
Chart (1996)	Peak position
UK Club Chart (Music Week)	53
