= Erasure (album) =

Studio album by Erasure
- Released: 23 October 1995
- Recorded: 1995
- Studios: Strongroom (London); Sorcerer Sound (New York City); 37B (Chertsey, England)
- Genres: Synth-pop; ambient
- Length: 71:25
- Label: Mute
- Producers: Thomas Fehlmann; Gareth Jones

Erasure chronology
I Say I Say I Say (1994)	Erasure (1995)	Cowboy (1997)

Singles from Erasure
- 1. "Stay with Me" Released: 11 September 1995; 2. "Fingers & Thumbs (Cold Summer's Day)" Released: 27 November 1995; 3. "Rock Me Gently" Released: 12 February 1996

Professional ratings
Review scores
Source	Rating
AllMusic	3/5 stars
Cash Box	favourable
Music & Media	favourable
NME	6/10

Erasure is the seventh studio album by English synth-pop duo Erasure, released on 23 October 1995 by Mute Records. It was produced by Thomas Fehlmann (of the Orb) and Gareth Jones.

An overtly experimental and introspective album, Erasure contains 11 mostly mid-tempo tracks that differed from their past output of shiny, three-minute pop songs. Most tracks clock in at five minutes or more, several contain long synth interludes, and guest artists include the London Community Gospel Choir and performance artist Diamanda Galás.

Although appreciated for its experimental nature, Erasure marked the end of a run of four consecutive number-one albums in the UK, failing to even hit the top 10, with both single releases also missing the UK top ten. After a successful top 20 debut on the Billboard 200 for their previous album I Say I Say I Say, Erasure debuted and peaked at number 82 in the US and generated no Hot 100 singles. In Germany the album also peaked lower than previous albums, at number 87.

In an interview with DJ Ron Slomowicz circa 2006, Erasure were asked for their favourite album from their own catalogue. Bell stated "it's a toss-up between Chorus and the self-titled Erasure album from 1995", while Clarke chose Cowboy, stating "...our songwriting had really come together at that stage in time. All of those songs I'm just really, really proud of."

== Critical reception ==
Upon its release, Paul Moody of NME considered Erasure to be "almost more of the same" from the duo, except "there's a darker hue to their electronic meanderings this time around". He felt Clarke was "intent on making [a] serious-minded electronic piece" which, in turn, "makes their more heart-warming indulgences altogether less accessible" and resulted in "neither a ground-breaking slide into ambience or a fan-pleasing stomp over familiar ground". He concluded, "The overall impression is of Clarke spending endless weeks in his studio fully believing himself to be orbiting Ursa Minor while Bell blubs and bellows his way through the tormented pages of his diary whenever he gets the chance." Paul Lester of Melody Maker was negative in his review, calling the album "cheesy" and "a bit flat". He remarked the album was like "a Tim Rice/Andrew Lloyd Webber extravaganza set to an electro beat", "soundtrack music for Star Wars 6" and "handbag techno-pop featuring Bell's I-wanna-be-Judy-Garland impressions". He singled out "Stay with Me" as the exception, commenting that "you forget about Bell's grating neo-operatic warble and wonder instead at one of those breathtaking chord sequences Clarke seems to contrive every few years".

== Reissues ==
Subsequent to their acquisition of Erasure's back catalog, and in anticipation of the band's 30th anniversary in 2016, BMG commissioned reissues of all previously released UK editions of Erasure albums up to and including 2007's Light at the End of the World. All titles were pressed and distributed by Play It Again Sam on 180-gram vinyl and shrinkwrapped with a custom anniversary sticker.

In September 2022, Erasure announced the re-release of their self-titled 7th album in a special hardback book edition, with a bonus CD of remixes, released on 18 November 2022 through Mute/BMG records.

== Track listing ==
All tracks are written by Andy Bell and Vince Clarke.

No.	Title	Length
1.	"Intro: Guess I'm into Feeling"	3:38
2.	"Rescue Me"	6:10
3.	"Sono Luminus"	7:51
4.	"Fingers & Thumbs (Cold Summer's Day)"	6:44
5.	"Rock Me Gently"	10:01
6.	"Grace"	5:54
7.	"Stay with Me"	6:43
8.	"Love the Way You Do So"	6:43
9.	"Angel"	5:32
10.	"I Love You"	6:29
11.	"A Long Goodbye"	5:34
Total length:		71:25

2022 Expanded Edition, Disc two
No.	Title	Length
1.	"Fingers & Thumbs (Cold Summer's Day)" (SoundFactory remix radio edit)
2.	"Angel" (Love Eternal remix by TSF)
3.	"Rock Me Gently" (Stubbleman remix)
4.	"Stay with Me" (guitar mix)
5.	"Sono Luminus" (live acoustic version)
6.	"True Love Wars"
7.	"Hi NRG"
8.	"Chertsey Endlos"
9.	"Fingers & Thumbs (Cold Summer Day)" (Daybreakers mix)
10.	"Stay with Me" (NY mix)
11.	"True Love Wars" (Omni mix)
12.	"Rock Me Gently" (demo)
13.	"Sono Luminus" (demo)
14.	"Cold Summer's Day" (Wigstock version)
15.	"Rock Me Gently" (Glen Nicholls & Nick Squires remix)

== Personnel ==
- Andy Bell – vocals
- Vince Clarke – synthesizers, programming
- Diamanda Galás – vocals
- Paul Hickey – background vocals
- Ruby James – background vocals
- London Community Gospel Choir – choir, chorus

=== Production ===
- Dave Bascombe – mixing
- Blaise Dupuy – engineer
- Thomas Fehlmann – producer
- George Holt – engineer
- Ian Huffam – mixing assistant
- Gareth Jones – producer
- François Kevorkian – mixing
- Mike Marsh – mastering
- Patrick McGovern – mixing assistant
- Ashley Potter – illustrations
- Lloyd Puckitt – mixing
- Sly Smith – artwork
- Andy Strange – mixing assistant

== Charts ==
Chart performance for Erasure
Chart (1995)	Peak position
Australian Albums (ARIA)	175
Austrian Albums (Ö3 Austria)	33
Canada Top Albums/CDs (RPM)	43
European Albums (Music & Media)	80
German Albums (Offizielle Top 100)	87
Scottish Albums (Official Charts)	25
Swedish Albums (Sverigetopplistan)	26
UK Albums (Official Charts)	14
UK Independent Albums (OCC)	2
US Billboard 200	82

== Certifications ==
Certifications for Erasure
Region	Certification	Certified units/sales
United Kingdom (BPI)	Silver	60,000^{‡}
^{‡} Sales+streaming figures based on certification alone.
