= Petal (album) =

- Standard cover

Studio album by Ariana Grande
- Released: July 31, 2026
- Recorded: January – April 2026
- Studios: Jungle City (New York); Godzilya (Los Angeles); MXM (Los Angeles; Stockholm)
- Genres: Pop; R&B
- Length: 36:08
- Labels: Babydoll; Republic
- Producers: Ariana Grande; Ilya; Max Martin

Ariana Grande chronology
Wicked: For Good – The Soundtrack (2025)	Petal (2026)

Singles from Petal
- 1. "Hate That I Made You Love Me" Released: May 29, 2026; 2. "Petal" Released: July 31, 2026

Petal (stylized in all lowercase) is the eighth studio album by American singer and songwriter Ariana Grande. It was released through Republic Records and her own imprint, Babydoll Music, on July 31, 2026. Grande and Ilya Salmanzadeh wrote and executive-produced the album, with Max Martin contributing production on three tracks.

A pop and R&B album characterized by atmospheric production, synthesizers, drum machines, and an electronic soundscape, Petal explores themes of romance, self-worth, and fame. Titled after and based on the metaphor "petal in the pavement", the album revolves around finding hope and resilience from emotional and mental turmoil. Its songs reflect on failed romances with a negative view of the ex-partners, discuss falling in love again after painful breakups, and critique the negative sides of fame such as intense, obsessive scrutiny.

Two singles have been released from Petal. "Hate That I Made You Love Me" was released on May 29 as the lead single and topped the US Billboard Hot 100 and UK singles chart. The title track, "Petal", accompanied the album on July 31. Critical reception was polarized, with some reviewers complimenting the subdued music and vocals while others felt that the same factors undermined it. Petal topped the charts in 20 countries, including the US and the UK. At the 69th Annual Grammy Awards, Petal marked Grande's record-breaking seventh nomination in the Best Pop Vocal Album category; it was also nominated for Best Immersive Audio Album. She performed its tracks during the Eternal Sunshine Tour.

== Background and development ==
In March 2024, Republic Records released Ariana Grande's seventh studio album, Eternal Sunshine, which topped the US Billboard 200 and spawned the Billboard Hot 100 number-one singles "Yes, And?" and "We Can't Be Friends (Wait for Your Love)". In January 2026, Grande said that she would need "an extra brain and four more arms" to make another album, as she was on the promotional campaign in support of her performance as Glinda in the films Wicked (2024) and Wicked: For Good (2025).

It was confirmed that Grande finished recording her next studio album on April 8; that day, she shared an image of herself in the studio. On May 7, Grande detailed the album in an Instagram video, describing it as "a little feral". She said it draws from emotions she had previously been "too shy or polite to tap into before", adding that the album ultimately felt like "fuck it". She also characterized it as "full of life" and centered on overcoming negative attachments and personal struggles. According to her, Petal explores "breaking up with all different kinds of negative attachments" and was intended to allow listeners to apply its themes to their own experiences. In an interview ahead of Petal's premiere on Apple Music's Petal Radio, Grande said it drew from "many different parts" of herself and described it as more "experimental" than her previous work. She explained that much of the material was written from "an unfiltered rage" and that, unlike in the past, she resisted softening her lyrics through extensive rewrites.

== Composition ==
Petal is a pop and R&B album, consisting of midtempo and electro-infused songs. Journalists have named synth-pop, new wave, dream pop, hip-hop, shoegaze, garage rock, and pop rock as sounds infused into the album. However, Thomas H. Green of The Arts Desk disagreed with a Wikipedia description of the album's songs as combining "shoegaze, garage rock, pop rock, pop and R&B". Riff magazine described Petal as revolving around "lush, synth-laden soul" rather than "massive pop bangers". As with Eternal Sunshine, Grande co-wrote and co-produced the album with Ilya Salmanzadeh, while Max Martin contributed to three tracks. Salmandazeh also executive-produced the album.

Described by Grande as "very experimental", Petal further develops the electronic-R&B sound of her previous three studio albums through atmospheric production, drum-machine rhythms, and layered synthesizer textures. Critics noted Grande's restrained, honeyed vocal delivery throughout much of the album, with "Oh Well" singled out for showcasing her layered vocal production at its strongest. Petal features downcast lyrics and production that obscures Grande's soft falsetto vocals.

=== Music ===
The opening track, "Kiss Me", is a synth-pop and R&B song that prominently features electronic drum sounds. "Hate That I Made You Love Me" is a mid-tempo and down-tempo ballad mainly rooted in pop, alt-pop, R&B, and synth-pop. Bustle's Jake Viswanath wrote that it shared musical and thematic parallels with Taylor Swift's The Tortured Poets Department (2024), particularly in its subdued synth-driven production, lower vocal register, and lyrics addressing public scrutiny and fan expectations. The title track features an R&B production and blends doo-wop, drum and bass, hip hop-influenced rhythms, and waltz with pop rock instrumentation, combining distorted synthesizers, shifting guitar textures, booming bass, subtle tempo changes, and twinkling keyboards.

A pop ballad, "Stay" is built around oscillating xylophone-like synthesizers and a 1980s-inspired drum pattern. "Oh Well" includes UK garage elements, and "Big Feelings" features downtempo elements. "Freak" is a 1980s synth-pop song with rock influences, and it has drawn comparisons to Yazoo's Upstairs at Eric's (1982). "Like I Do", featuring trap beats reminiscent of Grande's 2019 album, Thank U, Next, opens with a wordless eight-note vocal motif before shifting into an ominous rhythm driven by distorted synthesizers. With elements of 2000s R&B, "Never Get Over Me" combines siren effects and piano with distorted guitar riffs over a slow-rolling funk groove. "Bad Thing (Bunny Hop)" is a new wave and R&B-infused pop rock, synth-pop, indie-pop, and pop punk track that contains elements of indie-rock. Mike DeWald of Riff magazine described it as "a fun change of pace", writing that it "veers toward synth-heavy alt-pop" while "structurally, it leans further [toward rock] than most of the other material here". The closing track, "Nowhere, Nobody", is a ballad.

=== Lyrical themes ===
==== Romance and fame ====
Petal explores romance, self-worth, and fame, with its songs generally taking a tone of subdued rage. The primary concept is a petal in the pavement cracks, which represents newfound hope, maturity, and resilience that arises from extreme turmoil. Grande described it as "something ... full of life and growing through the cracks of something cold and hard and challenging".

The album reflects on failed relationships, and some lyrics are written from a negative perspective. Grande tells someone that she "will find [her] way from [them]" on "Hate That I Made You Love Me" and wishes a past lover good luck when they go to hell on "Oh Well". She declares on the latter song that, though she genuinely loved its subject, they deserve more breakup songs about them. Grande compares a romance with someone to "ecstasy" in "Warning Signs (Interlude)", singing that the ex-partner "made [her] see colors [she hasn't] seen for a while", but she lost the attraction once they ghosted her. She then tells them that they did not deserve her.

Other songs have a positive outlook on future romance. "Stay" discusses love that seems "too good to be true", particularly a past relationship that Grande wants to rekindle. She hopes that when they get back together, she can feel safe again. On "Bad Thing (Bunny Hop)", she is tempted to pursue a romance with a "fine" lover who makes her feel younger despite the risks. On the closing track, "Nowhere, Nobody", Grande is emotionally ready to love someone despite acknowledging the challenges and possibility of failure, singing that "there's nowhere, nobody else [she'd] rather be" than with her lover.

A few of Petal's tracks incorporate a flirty, seductive tone. Grande urges a lover on "Kiss Me" to hold her as if she were about to die and kiss her as if they were to be apart soon. Kyle Denis of Billboard wrote that "Big Feelings" evokes "the sex-as-power aesthetic" of Grande's 2016 album, Dangerous Woman. On the song, she declares that sex with her can "make a grown man cry" and uses double entendres to allude to her desire for such encounters. She tells her partner that once she "become[s] so aquatic", he should "come swim in [her] waters". On "Like I Do", Grande sings, "You need me like I you / 'Cause no one fucks you like I do"; on "Never Get Over Me", she seduces a man into a sexual interaction that she promises he will never forget. Denis wrote that the former song could either pertain to Grande's sexual encounters or reflect on public opinion about her.

==== Social and criticism ====
In Petal, Grande also ponders the vitriol and criticism from her fans and the media. After singing about regrets over past romance on "Hate That I Made You Love Me", she reflects on her complicated relationship with the public's perception of her. With "Freak", she discusses the conflict between presenting a desired, curated image to others and expressing her true self. Grande references the obsessive scrutiny of her personal life on "Like I Do", in which she sings "extra, extra" and frames herself as the subject of a news story. The first verse contains the lyrics "I'm making cents off of your nonsense, all that shit talk keeps me well-fed", which Katie Hawthorn of The Guardian interpreted as "a possible dig at years of ... faux concern about her weight".

Some songs are about emerging triumphant from the sadness that comes with fame, recalling the "petal in the pavement" theme. She begins the title track, "Petal", with a critique of how artists like her have to use their personal struggles as inspiration for music. Grande wonders if the pain that comes with revisiting them is worth the approval and expresses disillusionment with her public image, including criticisms and negative perceptions of her dating history. Throughout the song, she refuses to be a victim and asserts, "This music and I will never die." On "Freak", Grande, expressing exhaustion over the public's "poison", desires to live a normal life free from the scrutiny that comes with fame.

== Release and promotion ==
In January 2026, Grande spoke with Billboard about working on a project that she was "very excited about", confirming that no new music would be released before May. She indicated that her new album was coming "soon enough" but was not yet completed. Grande subsequently began teasing new music in April; she shared several recording studio images through her Instagram, a video that features the caption "Petal in the pavement", and an audio message saying: "We're counting down the eights – oops! I mean the days. We'll see you this summer."

Grande officially announced Petal on April 28; its cover art, revealed in the same post, is a black-and-white close-up of herself smiling with her brunette hair partially covering her face and without her signature hairstyle, the ponytail. (Note: Attributed to The Fader, The Hollywood Reporter, Vulture, and Billboard) The album's artworks were photographed by Katia Temkin. Grande began revealing Petal's track listing in June, during the California shows of her Eternal Sunshine Tour. The title of the opening track, "Kiss Me", appeared in visuals preceding the first of two performances in Los Angeles; at the second show on June 14, the countdown glitched to reveal the third track's title, "Petal". The remaining track titles were unveiled during her June 19 concert in Inglewood. On July 8, Grande shared the album's alternate cover art and announced an exclusive vinyl edition available for pre-order through her website. She also previewed two upcoming songs; one teaser featured what was believed to be a snippet of "Oh Well", and the other showcased an additional unreleased track.

To promote Petal, Grande organized listening events at independent record stores worldwide. Canadian events were held from July 31 to August 2 across 16 stores in 13 cities spanning Alberta, British Columbia, Manitoba, Nova Scotia, Ontario, and Quebec. She also launched a Petal pop-up at Complex LA, which operated from July 31 to August 2. During the Montreal stop of her Eternal Sunshine Tour on July 28, Grande gave the live debut of the album's title track, "Petal", three days before release.

=== Distribution and singles ===
Composed of 12 tracks, Petal was released on July 31, 2026, through Grande's own imprint label, Babydoll Music, under exclusive license to Republic Records. (Note: Although various media outlets do not mention Grande's imprint label, Babydoll Music, streaming services state Petal is served through her label under Republic Records, a division of UMG Recordings. Billboard confirmed that it is her first album released through her company.) Its pre-order became available in cassette, CD, digital download, and LP formats, alongside an exclusive vinyl edition named "Cloudy Gray Girl". Grande exclusively released five alternate versions of the album to digital: Making a Song with Ari and Ilya; Process Is Fun, Voice Notes; Hello, I Love to Sing; Hello, Me Again.. I Love to Sing Some More; and Still Here, Still Singing. The latter three versions included recordings of her debut tour performances of "Stay", "Oh Well", "Petal", and "Like I Do" in Montreal and "Big Feelings" and "Never Get Over Me" in Chicago. The album's a cappella and instrumental versions also became available digitally. On September 8, she surprise-released a live album on iTunes Store featuring live versions of all tracks from Petal. It also includes a rehearsal recording of "Hate That I Made You Love Me" from the Eternal Sunshine Tour.

Grande announced "Hate That I Made You Love Me" as Petal's lead single on May 8, along with its cover art and release date. She produced it with Salmanzadeh and Martin. Grande shared a black-and-white promotional image with the caption citing a lyric from the song on May 26, followed by the music video teaser featuring actor Justin Long a day later. "Hate That I Made You Love Me" was released on May 29, with a lyric video featuring a style inspired by comic books. Its music video was released on June 1, along with two behind-the-scenes exclusively released via streaming services on June 3. "Hate That I Made You Love Me" debuted atop both the US Billboard Hot 100 and UK singles chart. Grande included it in the set list of the Eternal Sunshine Tour. The title track, "Petal", and its music video accompanied the album's release on July 31 as the second single.

== Critical reception ==
Professional ratings
Aggregate scores
Source	Rating
AnyDecentMusic?	6.3/10
Metacritic	67/100
Review scores
Source	Rating
AllMusic	4/5 stars
Consequence	C
The Daily Telegraph	4/5 stars
The Guardian	3/5 stars
The Independent	2/5 stars
NME	3.5/5 stars
Paste	C
Pitchfork	6.5/10
Rolling Stone	4/5 stars
The Times	4/5 stars

Music Times noted that reviews of Petal were generally positive, although critics were polarized on the album's restrained approach against the advertised emotional intensity. According to the review aggregator Metacritic, Petal received "generally favorable reviews" based on a weighted average score of 67 out of 100 from 16 critic scores. The review aggregator site AnyDecentMusic? compiled 15 reviews and gave the album a weighted average score of 6.3 out of 10, based on their assessment of the critical consensus.

Some reviews of Petal praised its defiant themes and subdued production style. Rob Sheffield of Rolling Stone commended the unfiltered emotion, opining that anger is the album's strength rather than a weakness. Billboard writer Kyle Denis thought Petal was "much more grounded" than Grande's earlier works, allowing her to weave "meaningful personal revelations in between genuinely hilarious digs". Attitude's Jamie Tabberer, Variety's Jem Aswad, and Sputnikmusic's Sowing agreed it is Grande's most profound and accomplished work yet, praising its emotional depth and offbeat, cohesive production. Will Hodgkinson of The Times characterized Petal as a dreamy, "old-fashioned" record, bolstered by a sophisticated production. No Ripcord's Tom Parmiter similarly described it as "a tightly arranged, focused set, with vocals and backing tracks mixed to precision" and commended its atmospheric production and melodic variation.

Some others commended Grande's emotional vulnerability and the atmospheric sound. Ludovic Hunter-Tilney of the Financial Times wrote that, although it was less outwardly furious than its promotional campaign suggested, its focused production gave "stylish musical expression to [Grande's] emotional tumult". Writing for the Los Angeles Times, Mikael Wood viewed it as "a dramatic shift from ... Eternal Sunshine", praising its percussion-driven production and describing the restrained vocals as "spooky, slightly creepy". NME's Kristen S. Hé wrote that "Petal largely sits in a place of discomfort", praising its experimental production and calling "Freak" Grande's "most poetic writing". The Irish Times writer Ed Power wrote that the record transformed Grande's "unfiltered rage" into an understated yet distinctive artistic statement and praised its atmospheric production and unconventional approach to "mainstream pop", despite feeling that the album "never quite blooms". Sonikka Noganathan of The Hindu also commended its storytelling, atmospheric production, and emotional arc, describing it as Grande's most convincing exploration of anger, fame, and healing. AllMusic's Neil Z. Yeung praised the album's restrained production, writing that it is "anything but passive" and that its "hardened R&B atmospherics" effectively reflect Grande's emotional turmoil.

Other reviews were mixed. Craig Jenkins of Vulture called Petal a solid album driven by Grande's desire to express herself over commercial appeal, praising its darker atmosphere and thematic focus on fame but noting that it is not a reinventive body of work. The Daily Telegraph's Neil McCormick described Petal as a sonically understated album but felt that its advertised "unfiltered rage" only came across as "mild irritation"; McCormick additionally criticized Grande's vocal delivery and a perceived lack of memorable hooks. Similarly, writing for Flood Magazine, Taila Lee considered the record less forceful than its promotional imagery suggested but complimented the "sleek pop/R&B soundscape". Thomas Green of The Arts Desk opined that the album's muted production alongside Grande's "airy" vocals means "there's also little that grabs". The Guardian's Katie Hawthorne liked Petal for its dark soundscape and restrained vocals but found its emotional themes somewhat repetitive. Aimee Cliff of Pitchfork and Maria Sherman of Associated Press were also amongst the reviewers who offered plaudits to the intimate sonics and vocals but questioned the "lackadaisical" production and "constrained" singing.

Some reviewers questioned the consistency of Petal's production and songwriting. Exclaim! critic Megan Lapierre and Consequence's Kofi Mframa acknowledged Grande's willingness to experiment but felt the result was rather "pussyfooted" and undermined by clumsy lyrics, distracting arrangements, and simplistic vocals. In The Sydney Morning Herald, Annabel Ross felt that spite rather than rage drove much of the album, criticizing its repetitive arrangements and "frustratingly muted" production and noting Petal came alive during its more vulnerable moments. The New York Times's Lindsay Zoladz and The Independent's Roisin O'Connor were disappointed with Petal's obscure sound, dubbing its monochrome production a drawback. They argued that the lyrics lacked the conviction of her previous outputs, resulting in a "bland" body of work, but considered "Hate That I Made You Love Me" as its flagship. Tom Breihan of Stereogum liked the album's sonic cohesion but felt that Grande had intentionally downplayed herself, resulting in "meticulously crafted background music" that disappoints when compared to her other albums. In Paste, Sam Rosenberg dismissed Petal as a "middling" work, struggling with undermined production and vague songwriting. Michael Savio of Slant Magazine agreed that Petal traces comfortable territory for Grande, with timid vocals and a serviceable production similar to Positions (2020). Rosenberg, Breihan, and Viswanath remarked that Petal is musically, thematically, and aesthetically similar to The Tortured Poets Department.

== Accolades ==
Awards and nominations
Organization	Year	Category	Result	Ref.
Grammy Awards	2027	Best Pop Vocal Album	Pending	
Grammy Awards	2027	Best Immersive Audio Album	Pending	

== Commercial performance ==
In the United States, Petal debuted at number one on the Billboard 200 with 295,000 album-equivalent units in its first week, marking Grande's biggest sales week there since Thank U, Next. It marked her seventh chart-topper, as well as her second-largest sales week and pure album sales debut with 168,000 units; 96,000 came from vinyl sales, the largest vinyl sales week of her career. She also joined Janet Jackson and Lady Gaga as the solo women with the fifth-most number-ones on the chart.

All 12 tracks from Petal entered the Billboard Hot 100 simultaneously, led by "Hate That I Made You Love Me" at number two, following its one-week run at number one upon debut; the title track debuted at number four, becoming Grande's 25th top-10 entry. The chart performance brought Grande's career Hot 100 entry total to 110, making her the 23rd artist and fourth woman in the chart's history to surpass 100 entries.

Petal topped the ARIA Albums Chart in Australia, Official Aotearoa Music Charts in New Zealand, and UK Albums Chart in the United Kingdom, marking her sixth chart-topper in those nations. It also topped Australia's Vinyl Chart. In France, Petal debuted at number one, becoming Grande's first chart-topper on the French Albums Chart.

== Track listing ==
All lyrics were written by Ariana Grande. All music was composed and produced by Grande and Ilya Salmanzadeh, except where noted.

Petal track listing
No.	Title	Music	Producer(s)	Length
1.	"Kiss Me"			3:39
2.	"Hate That I Made You Love Me"	Grande; Ilya; Max Martin	Grande; Ilya; Martin	3:17
3.	"Petal"	Grande; Ilya; Martin	Grande; Ilya; Martin	3:04
4.	"Stay"	Grande; Ilya; Martin	Grande; Ilya; Martin	2:28
5.	"Oh Well"			3:16
6.	"Big Feelings"			2:53
7.	"Freak"			3:19
8.	"Warning Signs (Interlude)"			1:17
9.	"Like I Do"			2:47
10.	"Never Get Over Me"			3:48
11.	"Bad Thing (Bunny Hop)"			3:28
12.	"Nowhere, Nobody"			2:52
Total length:				36:08

=== Notes ===
- All track titles are stylized in all lowercase.
- Eight versions containing additional tracks were released: two featuring a cappella and instrumental versions of all tracks; one featuring studio footage for "Big Feelings"; one featuring voice notes from the process behind "Petal", "Hate That I Made You Love Me", "Oh Well", "Freak", and "Like I Do"; three featuring live versions of "Stay", "Oh Well", "Petal", "Like I Do", "Big Feelings", and "Never Get Over Me"; and one featuring live versions of all tracks.

== Credits and personnel ==
The credits were adapted from Tidal and the "Dandelion White" vinyl jacket of "Hate That I Made You Love Me".

=== Studios ===
- Jungle City Studios; New York (recording: track 2)
- Godzilya Studios; Los Angeles (recording: track 2)
- MXM Studios; Los Angeles and Stockholm (recording: track 2)
- MixStar Studios; Virginia Beach (mixing: track 2)
- Sterling Sound; Edgewater (mastering: track 2)

=== Personnel ===
- Ariana Grande – lead vocals, producer, background vocals, engineer, recording arranger, vocal producer (all tracks); drum kit (track 2)
- Ilya Salmanzadeh – producer, bass, guitar, keyboard, programmer, engineer, recording arranger, vocal producer (all tracks); drum kit (tracks 1–7, 9–12), mix engineer (tracks 1, 3–12)
- Max Martin – producer, bass, engineer, guitar, keyboard, programmer, recording arranger, vocal producer (tracks 2–4); mix engineer (tracks 3–4)
- Davide Rossi – cello, viola, violin, strings arranger, strings producer (track 5)
- Jeremy Lertola – engineer (all tracks)
- Juan Arguello – engineer (all tracks), assistant mix engineer (tracks 1, 3–12)
- Lou Carrao – engineer (all tracks)
- Serban Ghenea – mix engineer (track 2)
- Bryce Bordone – assistant mix engineer (track 2)
- Randy Merrill – mastering engineer (all tracks)

== Charts ==
Chart performance
Chart (2026)	Peak position
Argentine Albums (CAPIF)	2
Australian Albums (ARIA)	1
Austrian Albums (Ö3 Austria)	1
Belgian Albums (Ultratop Flanders)	1
Belgian Albums (Ultratop Wallonia)	1
Canadian Albums (Billboard)	1
Croatian International Albums (HDU)	7
Czech Albums (ČNS IFPI)	8
Danish Albums (Hitlisten)	1
Dutch Albums (Album Top 100)	1
Finnish Albums (Suomen virallinen lista)	2
French Albums (SNEP)	1
German Albums (Offizielle Top 100)	1
German Pop Albums (Offizielle Top 100)	1
Greek Albums (IFPI)	2
Hungarian Albums (MAHASZ)	1
Irish Albums (Official Charts)	1
Italian Albums (FIMI)	1
Japanese Albums (Oricon)	29
Japanese Combined Albums (Oricon)	28
Japanese Hot Albums (Billboard Japan)	7
Lithuanian Albums (AGATA)	2
New Zealand Albums (RMNZ)	1
Nigerian Albums (TurnTable)	95
Norwegian Albums (VG-lista)	1
Polish Albums (ZPAV)	1
Portuguese Albums (AFP)	1
Scottish Albums (Official Charts)	1
Slovak Albums (ČNS IFPI)	5
Spanish Albums (Promusicae)	1
Swedish Albums (Sverigetopplistan)	2
Swiss Albums (Schweizer Hitparade)	1
UK Albums (Official Charts)	1
US Billboard 200	1

== Certifications ==
Certifications and sales
Region	Certification	Certified units/sales
France (SNEP)	Gold	50,000^{‡}
Portugal (AFP)	Gold	3,500^{‡}
United Kingdom (BPI)	Gold	100,000^{‡}
^{‡} Sales+streaming figures based on certification alone.

== Release history ==
Release dates and formats
Region	Date	Format(s)	Label(s)	Ref.
Various	July 31, 2026	Cassette; CD; digital download; LP; streaming	Babydoll; Republic	
