= Stay the Night =

Stay the Night may refer to:

== Songs ==
- "Stay the Night" (Alcazar song), 2009
- "Stay the Night" (Benjamin Orr song), 1986
- "Stay the Night" (Billy Ocean song), 1980, also covered by La Toya Jackson
- "Stay the Night" (Chicago song), 1984
- "Stay the Night" (Ghosts song), 2007
- "Stay the Night" (IMx song), 1999
- "Stay the Night" (James Blunt song), 2010
- "Stay the Night" (Millionaires song), 2010
- "Stay the Night" (Sigala and Talia Mar song), 2022
- "Stay the Night" (Zedd song), 2013, featuring Hayley Williams
- "Stay the Night", a 1983 song by Status Quo from Back to Back
- "Stay the Night", a 2000 song by 98 Degrees from Revelation
- "Stay the Night", a 1992 song by Brian McKnight from Brian McKnight
- "Stay the Night", a 2012 song by Green Day from ¡Uno!
- "Stay the Night", a 2005 song by Mariah Carey from The Emancipation of Mimi

== Other uses ==
- Stay the Night (1992 film), a 1992 TV film featuring Fred Thompson
- Stay the Night (2022 film), a 2022 theatrical film directed by Renuka Jeyapalan
- Stay the Night, a 1978 album by Jane Olivor and its title song

== See also ==
- "Stay for the Night", a 2005 song by Gotthard from Lipservice
