= Stay with Me (Erasure song) =

Single by Erasure

from the album Erasure
- B-side: "True Love Wars"
- Released: 11 September 1995
- Recorded: 1995
- Genre: Synth-pop; downtempo
- Length: 4:45 (single edit); 6:43 (album version)
- Label: Mute (UK); Elektra (US)
- Songwriters: Vince Clarke; Andy Bell
- Producers: Thomas Fehlmann; Gareth Jones

Erasure singles chronology
"I Love Saturday" (1994)	"Stay with Me" (1995)	"Fingers & Thumbs (Cold Summer's Day)" (1995)

Music video
- "Stay with Me" on YouTube

"Stay with Me" is a song by English synth-pop duo Erasure, released in September 1995 by Mute Records as the lead single from their self-titled, seventh studio album, Erasure (1995). Written by Vince Clarke and Andy Bell, it is a slow love ballad. Starting with simple synth chords from Clarke and subdued vocal from Bell, the song builds to a mid-tempo gospel-influenced conclusion, complete with vocal contributions from the London Community Gospel Choir. Like the other two singles from this album, it was edited for its release. The accompanying music video was directed by Mario Cavalli. In an interview with John Marshall from Lincs FM in 2009, Bell stated that "Stay With Me" was one of his favourite Erasure songs.

The single's B-side, "True Love Wars", is an extension of the Erasure album opener "Intro: Guess I'm Into Feeling". Both tracks use the same instrumental track and share several vocal elements, although they are different songs.

== Chart performance ==
"Stay with Me" was not as successful as prior Erasure singles, reaching number fifteen on the UK Singles Chart, and it did not chart in the United States or Germany. In Denmark and Sweden, it peaked at number 10 and 13, respectively. In Czech Republic, it was a top-20 hit and on the Eurochart Hot 100, the single peaked at number 71 on October 7, 1995.

== Critical reception ==
Larry Flick from Billboard magazine felt 'Stay with Me' stands among the duo's "most enchanting and hitworthy recordings to date." He noted that the music "blends delicate music-box-like keyboards with Andy Bell's gorgeous, theatrical vocal performance", and added further that "this ballad soars to a beautiful conclusion, as Bell is surrounded by a gospel choir that adds spiritual depth to the song's sweet, romantic lyrics." Ross Jones from The Guardian named it "one of their best; a salty slowie more beautiful than this world deserves." David Hemingway of Melody Maker called it "a fairly simple ballad juxtaposed with understated squiggly-sguiggy plink-plonk effects that are just slightly and intentionally 'synthetic' or 'artificial'" and added that it's "oddly, vaguely, endearing in its refusal to rock/pop out, in its almost wilful ordinariness". Pan-European magazine Music & Media wrote, "The question is which version are you going to air? ACE is best advised to take the Guitar Mix of the sad love song, EHR won't have problems with the electronic Flow Mix, while "dance" can do the rest."

Music Week gave it three out of five, naming it "a delicate but powerful electronic ballad, produced by the Orb's Thomas Fehlmann." Paul Gorman added that the "slow-burning" song "is heard best in context, where Clarke's churchy keyboard patterns are played against a classic, impassioned performance by Bell." Angela Lewis of NME noted the "leaden-paced, tinsel and twinkle thang could be a dozy Christmas ballad", with Bell's "words of love" being "as lust free as his voice". She continued, "Nowadays, Erasure still stroke the synth-pop handbook, but their plink-plonkery is dated, and one bets they couldn't honestly put hand on heart and pronounce they care as much as they used to." Another NME editor, Paul Moody, described it as "a boomy, gloomy ballad for three minutes, [then] untwines into a six-minute opus which closes with the ebb'n'flow of the tide (plus a nod to the Human League's 'Louise' along the way)". A reviewer from People Magazine wrote, "Thanks to an emphasis on gorgeous torch tunes like 'Rock Me Gently' and 'Stay with Me', lead singer Andy Bell's always operatic vocals take on a newfound luster". Mark Sutherland from Smash Hits gave it three out of five, saying, "This isn't one of their better efforts: a drama-queen ballad that takes far too long to get going and then conks out just as the engine starts revving."

== Music video ==
The music video for "Stay with Me" was directed by Mario Cavalli, depicting Andy Bell alone in an apartment, singing while glancing out the window. It was later made available on Erasure's official YouTube channel in September 2014.

== Retrospective response ==
Ned Raggett from AllMusic described the song as "quietly intoxicating". While reviewing "Erasure's 40 Greatest Tracks" in 2014, Chris Gerard from Metro Weekly wrote, "If anybody ever doubts that Andy Bell is a first-rate vocalist, play them 'Stay with Me' immediately. The layers of sound that he develops, along with Clarke's simple keyboard line, are simply magical." In his 2009 review of Erasure – Total Pop! Erasure's First 40 Hits", Darren Lee from The Quietus felt that it "remain [a] serviceable enough" ballad, "but lack the pizzazz and charm of earlier releases."

== Track listings ==
- Cassette single (CMUTE174)
1. "Stay With Me" (Single Edit)
2. "True Love Wars"
- 12" single (12MUTE174)
1. "Stay With Me" (NY Mix)
2. "Stay With Me" (Flow Mix)
3. "True Love Wars" (Omni Mix)
4. "Stay With Me" (Guitar Mix)
- CD single #1 (CDMUTE174)
1. "Stay With Me"
2. "True Love Wars"
3. "Stay With Me" (Basic Mix)
4. "True Love Wars" (Omni Mix)
- CD single #2 (LCDMUTE174)
1. "Stay With Me" (Flow Mix)
2. "Stay With Me" (NY Mix)
3. "Stay With Me" (Guitar Mix)
4. "Stay With Me" (Castaway Dub)
- US maxi-single (66084-2)
1. "Stay With Me" (Commercial Mix)
2. "Stay With Me" (Basic Mix)
3. "Stay With Me" (Flow Mix)
4. "Stay With Me" (Guitar Mix)
5. "Stay With Me" (NY Mix)
6. "True Love Wars"

== Charts ==
Chart (1995)	Peak position
Australia (ARIA)	170
Czech Republic (Hitparáda Radio)	18
Denmark (IFPI)	10
Europe (Eurochart Hot 100)	71
Israel (Israeli Singles Chart)	17
Scotland (OCC)	16
Sweden (Sverigetopplistan)	13
UK Singles (OCC)	15
UK Airplay (Music Week)	29
UK Indie (Music Week)	1
US Hot Dance Music Sales (Billboard)	35
