= Stay Awake =

Stay Awake may refer to:

== Music ==
=== Albums ===
- Stay Awake (Mike Scheidt album), 2012
- Stay Awake: Various Interpretations of Music from Vintage Disney Films, 1988

=== Songs ===
- "Stay Awake" (Dean Lewis song), 2019
- "Stay Awake" (Example song), 2011
- "Stay Awake" (Mary Poppins song), from the film Mary Poppins, 1964
- "Stay Awake", by Ellie Goulding and Madeon from Halcyon Days
- "Stay Awake", by Field Music from Commontime, 2016
- "Stay Awake", by Juliana Hatfield from Made in China, 2005
- "Stay Awake", by London Grammar from If You Wait, 2013
- "Stay Awake?", by Bastille from Give Me the Future, 2022
- "Stay Awake (Dreams Only Last for a Night)", by All Time Low from So Wrong, It's Right, 2007
- "Stay Awake (feat. Lil Uzi Vert)", by SoFaygo from Pink Heartz, 2022

== Other uses ==
- Stay Awake (book), a 2012 collection of short stories by Dan Chaon
- "Stay Awake", a 2000 short story by Poppy Z. Brite
- The Stay Awake, a South African horror film of 1987
- "Stay Awake" (Cow and Chicken), a television episode
- Stay Awake (film), a 2022 drama film
