= Stay with Me =

Stay with Me may refer to:

== Film and television ==
- Stay with Me (2004 film), an Italian film
- Stay with Me (2010 film), a Canadian drama film
- Stay with Me (2018 film), a South Korean romantic drama film
- Stay with Me (2016 TV series), a Chinese romantic comedy series
- Stay with Me (2023 TV series), a Chinese drama series
- Stay with Me (Philippine TV series) (Hindi Ko Kayang Iwan Ka), a 2018 drama series

== Literature ==
- Stay with Me (novel), a 2017 novel by Ayobami Adebayo
- Stay with Me, a 2014 novel by J. Lynn (pen name of Jennifer Armentrout)

== Music ==
=== Albums ===
- Stay with Me (Billie Holiday album), 1955
- Stay with Me (Kiki Dee album), 1979
- Stay with Me (Regina Belle album), 1989
- Stay with Me (Vic Damone album), 1966
- Stay with Me, by Norman Brown, 2007

=== Songs ===
- "Stay with Me" (Alexander Klaws song), 2003
- "Stay with Me" (Calvin Harris, Justin Timberlake, Halsey and Pharrell Williams song), 2022
- "Stay with Me" (Chanyeol and Punch song), from the soundtrack of Guardian: The Lonely and Great God, 2016
- "Stay with Me" (DeBarge song), 1983
- "Stay with Me" (Erasure song), 1995
- "Stay with Me" (Exile song), 1978
- "Stay with Me" (Faces song), 1971
- "Stay with Me" (Ironik song), 2008
- "Stay with Me" (James Brown song), 1981
- "Stay with Me" (Koda Kumi song), 2008
- "Stay with Me" (Lorraine Ellison song), 1966, also known as "Stay with Me Baby", covered by several artists
- "Stay with Me" (Sam Smith song), 2014
- "Stay with Me" (You Me at Six song), 2010
- "Stay with Me (Brass Bed)", by Josh Gracin, 2005
- "Do Ya/Stay with Me", by McFly, 2008
- "Mayonaka no Door (Stay with Me)", by Miki Matsubara, 1979
- "One More Day (Stay with Me)", originally "Stay with Me", by Example, 2014
- "Stay with Me", by 112 from Room 112, 1998
- "Stay with Me", by Akcent from True Believers, 2009
- "Stay with Me", by Angelic, 2001
- "Stay with Me", by BeBe & CeCe Winans, 1994
- "Stay with Me", by Blue Mink, 1972
- "Stay with Me", by Blue October from This Is What I Live For, 2020
- "Stay with Me", by Bret Michaels from Ballads, Blues & Stories, 2001
- "Stay with Me", by Danity Kane from Danity Kane, 2006
- "Stay with Me", by Diana Ross from To Love Again, 1981
- "Stay with Me", by the Dictators from Bloodbrothers, 1978
- "Stay with Me", by Dolores O'Riordan from Are You Listening?, 2007
- "Stay with Me", by Eighth Wonder, 1987
- "Stay with Me", by Finch from What It Is to Burn, 2002
- "Stay with Me", by Foghat from Stone Blue, 1978
- "Stay with Me", by the Gap Band from Gap Band IV, 1982
- "Stay with Me", by Gigi D'Agostino, 2010
- "Stay with Me", by Gotthard from Silver, 2017
- "Stay with Me", by Hatchie from Keepsake, 2019
- "Stay with Me", by Howard Jones from Transform, 2019
- "Stay with Me", by In Flames from I, the Mask, 2019
- "Stay with Me", by Kaoru Amane, stage name of Erika Sawajiri, 2006
- "Stay with Me", by Ken Hirai from Stare At, 1996
- "Stay with Me", by the Mission from God's Own Medicine, 1986
- "Stay with Me", by Orchestral Manoeuvres in the Dark from English Electric, 2013
- "Stay with Me", by Perry Como from Lightly Latin, 1966
- "Stay with Me", by Pharrell Williams from In My Mind, 2006
- "Stay with Me", by Ricki-Lee Coulter from Ricki-Lee, 2005
- "Stay with Me", by Ryan Adams from Ryan Adams, 2014
- "Stay with Me", by Spiritualized from Ladies and Gentlemen We Are Floating in Space, 1997
- "Stay with Me", by STAYC from Metamorphic, 2024
- "Stay with Me", by Sweet from Cut Above the Rest, 1979
- "Stay with Me", by Thrice from To Be Everywhere Is to Be Nowhere, 2016
- "Stay with Me", by Tú, 1987
- "Stay with Me", from the musical City of Angels, 1989
- "Stay with Me", from the musical Into the Woods, 1986
- "Stay with Me (A Little While Longer)", by Ed Townsend, 1960
- "Stay with Me (By the Sea)", by Al Green from Lay It Down, 2008
- "Stay with Me (Unlikely)", by Celldweller from Celldweller, 2003
