= Let's Stay Together =

Let's Stay Together may refer to:

== Music ==
- Let's Stay Together (Al Green album), 1972
  - "Let's Stay Together" (Al Green song), the title song, also covered by Tina Turner in 1983
- Let's Stay Together (Jimmy McGriff album), 1972, featuring a version of the Al Green song
- "Let's Stay Together" (Lyfe Jennings song), 2006
- "Let's Stay Together", a song by Ludacris from the 2008 album Theater of the Mind
- "Let's Stay Together", a single by Guy from the 1990 album The Future

== Other ==
- Let's Stay Together (TV series), a BET original series
- "Let's Stay Together" (30 Rock), an episode of 30 Rock
- Let's Stay Together (campaign group), a group which was formed to campaign for a 'no' vote in the 2014 Scottish independence referendum

== See also ==
- Let's Stick Together (disambiguation)
