= Petal (song) =

- Digital cover

Single by Ariana Grande

from the album Petal
- Released: July 31, 2026
- Genre: R&B
- Length: 3:04
- Label: Babydoll; Republic
- Composers: Ariana Grande; Max Martin; Ilya Salmanzadeh
- Lyricist: Ariana Grande
- Producers: Ariana Grande; Ilya Salmanzadeh; Max Martin

Ariana Grande singles chronology
"Hate That I Made You Love Me" (2026)	"Petal" (2026)

Music video
- "Petal" on YouTube

"Petal" (stylized in all lowercase) is a song by American singer and songwriter Ariana Grande and the second single from her eighth studio album, Petal. It was released on July 31, 2026, through Republic Records and her own imprint, Babydoll Music. Written and produced by Grande, Ilya Salmanzadeh, and Max Martin, the R&B song incorporates hip-hop and pop rock elements through distorted synthesizers, guitars, and booming bass. Lyrically, it examines the emotional toll of fame, artistic vulnerability, and Grande's defiant response to public scrutiny.

"Petal" was praised by music critics for its ambitious production and vocal performance, with several highlighting it as one of the album's standout tracks. It reached the top ten in numerous international markets, including Australia, Canada, Ireland, New Zealand, Switzerland, the United Kingdom, and the United States. Grande debuted "Petal" during the Eternal Sunshine Tour before releasing an accompanying VistaVision-shot music video directed by Christian Breslauer, in which she portrays an aspiring performer named Pepper.

== Background and promotion ==
Grande recorded "Petal" for her eighth studio album, Petal (2026), which she co-wrote and executive produced with the Iranian-Swedish producer Ilya Salmanzadeh. Grande began teasing the album in April 2026 through a series of social media posts and studio images, before announcing Petal and its cover artwork on April 28, 2026.

At the second of two shows at the Crypto.com Arena in Los Angeles on June 14, a countdown displayed on the venue's circular screen briefly glitched to reveal "3. petal", confirming Petal's title track as its third song. On July 28, Grande unveiled a black-and-white teaser for the music video introducing an aspiring entertainer named Pepper, portrayed by Grande herself. The clip ends by revealing Petal's release date and noting that it was "shot entirely on VistaVision", previewing a visual project released alongside the album. It was released as Petal's second single on July 31, the time the album was released.

== Composition ==
"Petal" was written solely by Grande, who co-composed and co-produced it with Salmanzadeh and Max Martin. With an R&B production, it blends hip hop-influenced rhythms with pop rock elements, featuring distorted synthesizers, shape-shifting guitars, booming bass, subtle tempo changes, and twinkling keyboards.

"Petal" is about emerging triumphant from the sadness that comes with fame, recalling the album's "petal in the pavement" metaphor. She begins with a critique of how artists like her have to use their personal struggles as inspiration for music. Grande wonders if the pain that comes with revisiting them is worth the approval and expresses disillusionment with her public image, including criticisms and negative perceptions of her dating history. Throughout the song, she refuses to be a victim and asserts, "This music and I will never die." She responds to public scrutiny in a defiant way with lines such as "Bitch, I'm practically drowning in my blessings".

== Reception ==
Variety author Jem Aswad believed that "Petal" highlights Grande's development as a vocalist and vocal arranger through its intricate vocal arrangements and emotionally nuanced delivery. Kyle Denis of Billboard ranked "Petal" first from Petal, describing the track as "one of the most ambitious and compelling" works by Grande, Salmanzadeh, and Martin and adding that it reclaims sounds from her earlier eras while drawing "a line in the sand" between her public persona and artistic evolution. Rolling Stone's Rob Sheffield interpreted the song as Grande channeling controversy and tabloid attention into her art. He described it as part of the album's recurring expression of "unfiltered rage".

In a reader poll published by Billboard, "Petal" was voted the favorite new music release of the week, receiving 41% of the votes ahead of releases by Cardi B, Davido, Slayyyter, and Shaboozey.

== Live performance ==
Grande first performed "Petal" live during the Montreal stop of her Eternal Sunshine Tour at Bell Centre on July 28, 2026, which featured her in a white dress during the show's closing sequence that culminated in her ascent toward a UFO as part of the concert's staging.

== Music video ==
Grande as Pepper during the chainsaw scene, against a blood-red backdrop

The accompanying music video, directed by Christian Breslauer (who also makes a cameo appearance) and filmed in the 1950s VistaVision format, stars Grande as "Pepper", an aspiring performer repeatedly rejected during auditions at the fictional Fame INC. headquarters. After successive attempts to conform to the executives' changing expectations—including altering her appearance—Pepper is ultimately criticized as "inauthentic". She responds by killing the panel with a chainsaw before returning to the lobby covered in blood, where the other aspiring performers applaud her. In the closing scene, the events are revealed to be part of a film production, with Pepper having become the star of the movie.

On August 5, 2026, Grande shared behind-the-scenes photographs from the video's production on Instagram, thanking Breslauer and the crew for helping "bring this song of mine to life" and praising their "brilliance, care and time".

== Accolades ==
Awards and nominations
Organization	Year (Note: Indicates the year of ceremony. Each year is linked to the article about the awards held that year, wherever possible.)	Category	Result	Ref(s).
UK Music Video Awards	2026	Best Colour Grading in a Video	Nominated	

== Charts ==
=== Weekly charts ===
Weekly chart performance
Chart (2026)	Peak position
Argentina Hot 100 (Billboard)	76
Australia (ARIA)	5
Austria (Ö3 Austria Top 40)	12
Bolivia Airplay (Monitor Latino)	11
Brazil Hot 100 (Billboard)	30
Canada Hot 100 (Billboard)	5
Canada CHR/Top 40 (Billboard)	5
Central America Anglo Airplay (Monitor Latino)	11
Costa Rica Anglo Airplay (Monitor Latino)	11
Croatia International Airplay (Top lista)	76
Czech Republic Singles Digital (ČNS IFPI)	45
Dominican Republic Anglo Airplay (Monitor Latino)	20
El Salvador Anglo Airplay (Monitor Latino)	11
Estonia Airplay (TopHit)	59
Finland (Suomen virallinen lista)	28
France (SNEP)	20
Germany (GfK)	19
Global 200 (Billboard)	2
Greece International (IFPI)	5
Guatemala Anglo Airplay (Monitor Latino)	11
Hong Kong (Billboard)	8
Iceland (Billboard)	24
Ireland (IRMA)	9
Israel (Mako Hitlist)	64
Italy (FIMI)	44
Japan Hot Overseas (Billboard Japan)	10
Latvia Streaming (LaIPA)	12
Lebanon (Lebanese Top 20)	13
Lithuania (AGATA)	16
Luxembourg (Billboard)	14
Malaysia (IFPI)	3
Malaysia International (RIM)	2
Middle East and North Africa (IFPI)	18
Netherlands (Dutch Top 40)	34
Netherlands (Single Top 100)	13
New Zealand (Recorded Music NZ)	5
Nigeria (TurnTable Top 100)	72
Norway (VG-lista)	17
Panama Streaming (PRODUCE)	33
Philippines (IFPI)	9
Poland Streaming (OLiS)	27
Portugal (AFP)	6
Puerto Rico Anglo Airplay (Monitor Latino)	8
Romania (Billboard)	10
Saudi Arabia (IFPI)	19
Singapore (RIAS)	2
Slovakia Singles Digital (ČNS IFPI)	30
Spain (Promusicae)	39
Sweden (Sverigetopplistan)	14
Switzerland (Schweizer Hitparade)	7
Taiwan (Billboard)	7
Thailand (Billboard)	15
United Arab Emirates (IFPI)	5
UK Singles (Official Charts)	4
UK Hip Hop/R&B (Official Charts)	1
US Billboard Hot 100	4
US Adult Pop Airplay (Billboard)	33
US Pop Airplay (Billboard)	5
Venezuela Anglo Airplay (Monitor Latino)	13
Vietnam (IFPI)	19

=== Monthly charts ===
Monthly chart performance
Chart (2026)	Peak position
Estonia Airplay (TopHit)	78
Panama Streaming (PRODUCE)	89

== Release history ==
Release dates and formats
Region	Date	Format(s)	Label(s)	Ref.
Various	July 31, 2026	Digital download; streaming	Babydoll; Republic	
Italy	July 31, 2026	Radio airplay	Island	
United States	August 4, 2026	Contemporary hit radio	Republic	
Various	October 30, 2026	7-inch vinyl; CD	Babydoll; Republic	
Various	October 30, 2026	Digital EP	Babydoll; Republic	
