= Hate That I Made You Love Me =

- Standard cover

Single by Ariana Grande

from the album Petal
- Released: May 29, 2026
- Studio: Jungle City (New York); Godzilya (Los Angeles); MXM (Los Angeles; Stockholm)
- Genre: Pop; alt-pop; R&B; synth-pop; downtempo
- Length: 3:17
- Label: Babydoll; Republic
- Composers: Ariana Grande; Max Martin; Ilya Salmanzadeh
- Lyricist: Ariana Grande
- Producers: Ariana Grande; Ilya; Max Martin

Ariana Grande singles chronology
"Twilight Zone" (2025)	"Hate That I Made You Love Me" (2026)	"Petal" (2026)

Music video
- "Hate That I Made You Love Me" on YouTube

"Hate That I Made You Love Me" (stylized in all lowercase) is a song by American singer and songwriter Ariana Grande, serving as the lead single from her eighth studio album, Petal (2026). It was released on May 29, 2026, through her own imprint label, Babydoll Music, under exclusive license to Republic Records. Written and produced by Grande, Ilya Salmanzadeh, and Max Martin, it is a pop, alt-pop, R&B, synth-pop, and downtempo song with trap elements. Grande performed the song during the Eternal Sunshine Tour.

"Hate That I Made You Love Me" received mixed reviews from critics, with some praising its subtle melody, distinctive atmosphere, and understated production, while others found it derivative and less compelling than Grande's previous singles. The track reached number one on the Billboard Global 200 and topped the primary charts in Malaysia, Singapore, Switzerland, the United Kingdom, and the United States while reaching the top ten in Australia, Austria, Canada, France, Germany, Ireland, the Netherlands, New Zealand, the Philippines, Sweden, and Vietnam. At the 2026 MTV Video Music Awards, it won Best Visual Effects and Song of Summer. It was nominated for Song of the Year and Best Music Video at the 69th Annual Grammy Awards.

== Background and composition ==
In a post shared on Grande's Instagram, she stated: "One of my favorite songs I'll ever write." She also revealed that it was produced by her "favorite collaborators and dearest human beings in the world", mentioning Ilya Salmanzadeh and Max Martin, as well as herself. Grande recorded the song at Jungle City (New York), Godzilya (Los Angeles), and MXM Studios (Stockholm), and wrote the lyrics by herself. She composed and produced the song along with Salmanzadeh and Martin, while it was mixed and mastered by Serban Ghenea and Randy Merrill, respectively.

"Hate That I Made You Love Me"
"Hate That I Made You Love Me" is a pop and R&B ballad with trap elements, featuring a minimalist and midtempo production with synthesizers. Grande delivers a subdued vocal performance and uses her lower register.

"Hate That I Made You Love Me" is a mid and down-tempo pop, alt-pop, R&B, and synth-pop ballad that features trap elements and Grande's subdued vocal delivery over a sauntering instrumental. (Note: Attributed to multiple sources) Built around moody and minimalist synth production, the song addresses the admiration Grande has received throughout her career and the ways in which public support can later become criticism. It expresses regret over a relationship while also reflecting Grande's conflicted feelings about fame and public scrutiny. Lines like "you all gave me your hearts" in the bridge extend beyond a romantic relationship and reflect her experiences with public scrutiny, including commentary surrounding her appearance and body.

According to iHeartRadio's Sarah Tate, although "Hate That I Made You Love Me" initially appears to focus on relationship struggles, its lyrics also reflect Grande's complicated feelings toward fame and public attention. Sam Prance of Capital interpreted the track as containing multiple meanings, similarly to Grande's 2024 single "We Can't Be Friends (Wait for Your Love)". DIY's Daisy Carter highlighted Grande's use of a lower vocal register on the song, describing it as a "woozy, hypnotic cut". Jake Viswanath from Bustle noted parallels with Taylor Swift's 2024 album The Tortured Poets Department in its subdued synth-driven production, lower vocal register, and lyrics addressing public scrutiny.

== Promotion and release ==
Grande performing "Hate That I Made You Love Me" on the Eternal Sunshine Tour

On May 8, 2026, Grande shared the cover artwork of "Hate That I Made You Love Me", the lead single from her eighth studio album, Petal (2026). Its black-and-white cover artwork features a close-up image of Grande partially obscured by her hair, resembling the visual style used for the cover of Petal. "Hate That I Made You Love Me" became available for pre-order in digital and physical editions, including 7-inch vinyl, cassette, and CD—featuring two versions: an a cappella and instrumental version.

A snippet of "Hate That I Made You Love Me" was released on May 18; accompanied by a black-and-white teaser visual featuring fragmented text and photographs of Grande, the clip uses processed ambient sounds resembling falling water droplets rather than audible lyrics or vocals. On May 26, Grande shared a black-and-white promotional image for Petal on Instagram, with the accompanying caption referencing the song's lyric, "cause i barely tried". "Hate That I Made You Love Me" was released on May 29 via Babydoll Music and Republic Records, along with an accompanying lyric video featuring a style inspired by comic books. The song was serviced to US hot AC radio on June 1. It was later serviced to US pop and rhythmic radio on June 2. A cappella and instrumental versions were released to digital platforms on the same day. Grande continued releasing alternate digital editions of the single over the following days, beginning with a live-from-rehearsal version on June 3, followed on June 4 by further versions focused on alternate vocals, the music video edit, guitars, and a stripped-down arrangement. (Note: Attributed to multiple sources) She first performed "Hate That I Made You Love Me" during the Eternal Sunshine Tour.

== Critical reception ==
"Hate That I Made You Love Me" received mixed reviews from music critics. In a mixed review, Paolo Ragusa of Consequence considered its central theme less compelling than Grande's previous relationship-oriented singles, arguing that it revisits ideas explored on her seventh studio album, Eternal Sunshine (2024), without offering significant new insight into her perspective. Ragusa nevertheless described the track as "breezy", though not an especially "eventful" return for her. Vulture's Craig Jenkins argued that both the production and songwriting recalled earlier pop trends, especially the styles of artists like Taylor Swift and the Weeknd, and felt that the "dour" track lacked the rhythmic energy and immediacy of many of Grande's previous lead singles.

Stereogum author Margaret Farrell described "Hate That I Made You Love Me" as possessing an "uncanniness" and highlighted its bubbly yet off-kilter production and Grande's use of a lower vocal register. Farrell noted an underlying sense of unease beneath the song's melodic surface and compared aspects of its sound to Modern Talking's "Cheri, Cheri Lady" (1985). Jordi Bardají of Jenesaispop described it as a "subtle and direct" song and praised its melody, which he called "beautiful", though presented in a "more delicate package" than Grande's previous singles.

== Commercial performance ==
On its release day, "Hate That I Made You Love Me" recorded 8.8 million streams on Spotify, becoming Grande's third-biggest debut on the platform after "Yes, And?" (2024) and the remix of the Weeknd's "Die for You" (2023). Globally, the song debuted at number one on the Billboard Global 200 chart, becoming Grande's fifth chart-topper. According to Luminate, it drew 63.4 million streams and sold 81,000 downloads worldwide from its May 29 release through June 4. It remained at number one for two more weeks. In September 2026, it was named by Spotify and Billboard as the most-streamed and top-performing Global 200 song of the summer, respectively.

"Hate That I Made You Love Me" entered at number one in Switzerland, the United Kingdom, and the United States. Grande's tenth number-one single and eighth number-one debut on the US Billboard Hot 100, she became the seventh solo female artist to amount ten number-ones on the chart and the thirteenth overall. She also tied Stevie Wonder, Janet Jackson, and Bruno Mars for the seventh-most number-ones and Swift for the most number-one debuts among female artists, and the second overall after Drake. The song's number-one premiere was fueled by 23.6 million streams, 18.9 million radio airplay audience impressions, and 70,000 copies. It also topped Billboard's Pop Airplay and Adult Pop Airplay charts, becoming Grande's first chart-topper on the latter and her eleventh on the former. On the UK singles chart, it was her eighth single to debut at the top and first since "Positions" (2020). After spending one week at number one, it remained in the top ten for 13 weeks.

Elsewhere, the song debuted within the top five in Austria, Germany, Ireland, New Zealand, and Australia and the top ten in France, the Netherlands, and Sweden. It was Grande's second top-five hit in Germany, her fifth in Austria, and her third top-ten hit in France. On the Irish Singles Chart, it spent twelve weeks in the top 20 and five weeks in the top ten.

== Accolades ==
Awards and nominations
Organization	Year (Note: Indicates the year of ceremony. Each year is linked to the article about the awards held that year, wherever possible.)	Category	Result	Ref(s).
Camerimage Film Festival	2026	Best Music Video	Pending	
MTV Video Music Awards	2026	Song of Summer	Won	
MTV Video Music Awards	2026	Best Visual Effects	Won	
MTV Video Music Awards	2026	Video of the Year	Nominated	
MTV Video Music Awards	2026	Best Pop	Nominated	
MTV Video Music Awards	2026	Best Art Direction	Nominated	
MTV Video Music Awards	2026	Best Cinematography	Nominated	
MTV Video Music Awards	2026	Best Editing	Nominated	
Nickelodeon Kids' Choice Awards	2026	Favorite Song	Nominated	
UK Music Video Awards	2026	Best Production Design in a Video	Nominated	
Grammy Awards	2027	Song of the Year	Pending	
Grammy Awards	2027	Best Music Video	Pending	

== Music video ==
Directed by Christian Breslauer and starring actor Justin Long, the music video for "Hate That I Made You Love Me" was released on June 1, 2026. Its teaser was released on May 27, which features Long driving a car before noticing Grande staring at him through the rearview mirror. It concludes with the song's title displayed in a font resembling posters for the 1986 film, The Hitcher. Polish cinematographer Janusz Kamiński shot the visuals for the song's music video. On June 3, two behind-the-scenes videos were released exclusively to music streaming services: the "Bad News Montage" exclusively on Apple Music and the "Bunny Hop Montage" exclusively on Spotify.

Grande in a lemon-yellow AKNVAS dress, a recurring visual element throughout the music video

Throughout the horror and comedy-themed video, Long's character attempts to move on from the past while repeatedly encountering Grande's character, and creates an increasingly surreal narrative where reality and imagination become difficult to distinguish. The video first shows Long's character perhaps burying Grande in the desert, before becoming haunted by recurring visions of her. Grande awakens in an underground bunker, where she reads journals of her songwriting and insecurities. After Long accidentally crashes his car and inadvertently sets himself on fire while trying to rid himself of her, multiple versions of Grande surround him at a diner. Flustered, Long returns to the burial site, where he discovers the door to the bunker, while Grande escapes and buries him alive.

Publications highlighted Long's presence. Vulture writer Jason P. Frank drew comparisons to his performances in Barbarian (2022) and Tusk (2014). Chris DeVille of Stereogum highlighted a sequence in which Long's character survives being engulfed in flames. Critics also noted continuation of elements from Grande's other music videos, such as film-inspired visuals, and the use of a single bright colorful element to contrast with the general muted color palette. The video received seven nominations at the 2026 MTV Video Music Awards, including Video of the Year and Best Pop; it won Best Visual Effects and Song of Summer.

== Credits and personnel ==
Credits were adapted from the "Dandelion White" vinyl jacket.

=== Recording and management ===
- Recorded at Jungle City Studios (New York), Godzilya Studios (Los Angeles), and MXM Studios (Los Angeles; Stockholm)
- Mixed at MixStar Studios (Virginia Beach)
- Mastered at Sterling Sound (Edgewater)

=== Personnel ===
- Ariana Grande – lead vocal, composer, producer, background vocal, drum kit, engineer, recording arranger, vocal producer
- Ilya Salmanzadeh – composer, producer, bass, drum kit, engineer, guitar, keyboard, programmer, recording arranger, vocal producer
- Max Martin – composer, producer, bass, engineer, guitar, keyboard, programmer, recording arranger, vocal producer
- Jeremy Lertola – engineer
- Juan Arguello – engineer
- Lou Carrao – engineer
- Serban Ghenea – mix engineer
- Bryce Bordone – assistant mix engineer
- Randy Merrill – mastering engineer

== Charts ==
=== Weekly charts ===
Weekly chart performance
Chart (2026)	Peak position
Argentina Hot 100 (Billboard)	15
Argentina Airplay (Monitor Latino)	10
Australia (ARIA)	2
Australia Airplay (RCS)	3
Austria (Ö3 Austria Top 40)	3
Belgium (Ultratop 50 Flanders)	42
Belgium (Ultratop 50 Wallonia)	11
Bolivia Airplay (Monitor Latino)	8
Brazil Hot 100 (Billboard)	14
Bulgaria Airplay (PROPHON)	10
Canada Hot 100 (Billboard)	2
Canada AC (Billboard)	5
Canada CHR/Top 40 (Billboard)	1
Canada Hot AC (Billboard)	4
Central America Anglo Airplay (Monitor Latino)	5
Chile Anglo Airplay (Monitor Latino)	5
Colombia Anglo Airplay (Monitor Latino)	7
CIS Airplay (TopHit)	70
Costa Rica Anglo Airplay (Monitor Latino)	5
Croatia International Airplay (Top lista)	6
Czech Republic Singles Digital (ČNS IFPI)	50
Denmark (Tracklisten)	17
Denmark Airplay (Tracklisten)	2
Dominican Republic Anglo Airplay (Monitor Latino)	5
Ecuador Anglo Airplay (Monitor Latino)	12
El Salvador Anglo Airplay (Monitor Latino)	9
Estonia Airplay (TopHit)	48
Finland (Suomen virallinen lista)	27
France (SNEP)	9
Germany (GfK)	4
Global 200 (Billboard)	1
Greece International (IFPI)	2
Guatemala Anglo Airplay (Monitor Latino)	1
Hong Kong (Billboard)	3
Iceland (Billboard)	8
India International (IMI)	8
Indonesia (Billboard)	25
Ireland (IRMA)	3
Israel (Mako Hitlist)	50
Italy (FIMI)	24
Jamaica Airplay (JAMMS)	2
Japan Hot 100 (Billboard)	79
Latin America Anglo Airplay (Monitor Latino)	4
Latvia Airplay (LaIPA)	17
Latvia Streaming (LaIPA)	15
Lithuania (AGATA)	13
Lithuania Airplay (TopHit)	11
Luxembourg (Billboard)	7
Malaysia (IFPI)	1
Malta Airplay (Radiomonitor)	10
Mexico Airplay (Monitor Latino)	15
Middle East and North Africa (IFPI)	5
Netherlands (Dutch Top 40)	28
Netherlands (Single Top 100)	6
New Zealand (Recorded Music NZ)	3
Nicaragua Anglo Airplay (Monitor Latino)	2
Nigeria (TurnTable Top 100)	33
Nigeria Airplay (TurnTable)	16
Norway (VG-lista)	6
Panama International (PRODUCE)	23
Panama International (PRODUCE) A cappella version	29
Panama Airplay (Monitor Latino)	15
Paraguay Anglo Airplay (Monitor Latino)	5
Peru Anglo Airplay (Monitor Latino)	3
Philippines Hot 100 (Billboard Philippines)	1
Poland Airplay (OLiS)	24
Poland Streaming (OLiS)	31
Portugal (AFP)	8
Puerto Rico Anglo Airplay (Monitor Latino)	1
Russia Airplay (TopHit)	86
Saudi Arabia (IFPI)	7
Serbia Airplay (Radiomonitor)	18
Singapore (RIAS)	1
Slovakia Airplay (ČNS IFPI)	33
Slovakia Singles Digital (ČNS IFPI)	24
South Africa Airplay (TOSAC)	3
South Africa Streaming (TOSAC)	12
South Korea (Circle)	95
Spain (Promusicae)	31
Suriname (Nationale Top 40)	16
Sweden (Sverigetopplistan)	8
Switzerland (Schweizer Hitparade)	1
Taiwan (Billboard)	2
Thailand (IFPI)	2
United Arab Emirates (IFPI)	2
UK Singles (Official Charts)	1
Uruguay Anglo Airplay (Monitor Latino)	7
US Billboard Hot 100	1
US Adult Contemporary (Billboard)	14
US Adult Pop Airplay (Billboard)	1
US Pop Airplay (Billboard)	1
US Rhythmic Airplay (Billboard)	2
Venezuela Anglo Airplay (Monitor Latino)	3
Vietnam (IFPI)	3

=== Monthly charts ===
Monthly chart performance
Chart (2026)	Peak position
Brazil Streaming (Pro-Música Brasil)	30
CIS Airplay (TopHit)	70
Estonia Airplay (TopHit)	66
Latvia Airplay (TopHit)	84
Lithuania Airplay (TopHit)	21
Panama Streaming (PRODUCE)	37
Paraguay Airplay (SGP)	53
South Korea (Circle)	122

== Certifications ==
Region	Certification	Certified units/sales
Belgium (BRMA)	Gold	20,000^{‡}
Canada (Music Canada)	2× Platinum	160,000^{‡}
France (SNEP)	Gold	100,000^{‡}
New Zealand (RMNZ)	Platinum	30,000^{‡}
Portugal (AFP)	Platinum	25,000^{‡}
Switzerland (IFPI Switzerland)	Gold	15,000^{‡}
United Kingdom (BPI)	Gold	400,000^{‡}
United States (RIAA)	Platinum	1,000,000^{‡}
Streaming
Greece (IFPI Greece)	Gold	1,000,000^{†}
^{‡} Sales+streaming figures based on certification alone.^{†} Streaming-only figures based on certification alone.

== Release history ==
Release dates and formats
Region	Date	Format(s)	Version	Label(s)	Ref.
Various	May 29, 2026	Digital download; streaming	Original	Babydoll; Republic	
Various	May 29, 2026	7-inch vinyl; cassette; CD	Original; a cappella	Babydoll; Republic	
Various	May 29, 2026	7-inch vinyl; cassette; CD	Original; instrumental	Babydoll; Republic	
Italy	May 29, 2026	Radio airplay	Original	Island	
United States	June 1, 2026	Hot adult contemporary radio	Original	Republic	
United States	June 2, 2026	Contemporary hit radio	Original	Republic	
United States	June 2, 2026	Rhythmic contemporary radio	Original	Republic	
Various	June 2, 2026	Digital download	A cappella	Babydoll; Republic	
Various	June 2, 2026	Digital download	Instrumental	Babydoll; Republic	
Various	June 3, 2026	Digital download	"Live from Rehearsal"	Babydoll; Republic	
Various	June 4, 2026	Digital download	"Melody Pass"	Babydoll; Republic	
Various	June 4, 2026	Digital download	"Ari Lyric Draft from Bed"	Babydoll; Republic	
Various	June 4, 2026	Digital download	"Music Video Edit, Extended"	Babydoll; Republic	
Various	June 4, 2026	Digital download	"Guitars Only"	Babydoll; Republic	
Various	June 4, 2026	Digital download	"Stripped"	Babydoll; Republic	
Various	June 26, 2026	Streaming	Original; "Live from Rehearsal"; "Melody Pass"; "Ari Lyric Draft from Bed"; a cappella	Babydoll; Republic	
