= The Honeymoon Tour =

2015 concert tour by Ariana Grande

- Tour by Ariana Grande
- Promotional poster
- Location: Asia; Europe; North America; South America
- Associated album: My Everything
- Start date: February 25, 2015
- End date: October 25, 2015
- Legs: 6
- No. of shows: 88
- Attendance: 878,667 (89 shows)
- Box office: $41.8 million ($56.78 million in 2025 dollars)

Ariana Grande concert chronology
- The Listening Sessions (2013); The Honeymoon Tour (2015); Dangerous Woman Tour (2017)

The Honeymoon Tour was the second concert tour and the first world tour by American singer Ariana Grande, in support of her second studio album, My Everything (2014). It was officially announced on September 10, 2014. It traveled across North America, Europe, Asia and South America. The tour began on February 25, 2015, in Independence, Missouri, and concluded on October 25, 2015, in São Paulo, Brazil.

== Background ==
On June 5, 2014, about a month before the release of "Break Free", the second single from My Everything, Grande confirmed plans of a tour in support of the upcoming album on her Twitter account. Grande said that she had signed her tour contract and would be visiting continents other than North America, making it her first world tour. At the time, there were many rumors of a fellow recording artist, Iggy Azalea, joining her on tour after their success on Grande's track, "Problem", but these rumors were proven false when Grande and Azalea announced separate headlining tours in September and December, respectively.

About a week after the release of My Everything, on September 10, 2014, Grande officially announced the tour's title, which is a reference to the opening track of her first album, Yours Truly (2013), and the tour's North American leg. The first leg, which was promoted by Live Nation, visited 26 cities across North America beginning on February 25, 2015, in Independence and concluding on April 16, 2015, in Vancouver, British Columbia, Canada. Tickets for the first leg went on sale to the general public on September 20, 2014, through Live Nation's website. Supporting acts for the North American leg included the English pop rock band Rixton, who were promoting their first album, Let the Road (2015), and the Norwegian electronic dance music DJ Cashmere Cat.

The European leg of the tour was announced on November 17, 2014, about a week after Grande's performance and multiple wins at the 2014 MTV Europe Music Awards, in Glasgow, Scotland. The second leg started on May 14, 2015, in Paris and ended a month later on June 16, 2015, in Barcelona. Tickets for the second leg became available to the public four days after the announcement, on November 21, 2014.

In the months leading up to the tour, Grande had been publicly tweeting to her followers from rehearsals teasing them about the tour. To show her devotion for the tour, Grande tweeted, "These rehearsals are kicking my ass but I love it. Really want to make this show the best I'm capable of." Grande also shared a video from rehearsals that features her practicing with Mi.Mu Gloves, which she will be using onstage during her performances. Mi.Mu Gloves, which were designed and created by Imogen Heap, are used to alter the wearer's voice by moving their hands in different directions. In the rehearsal video, Grande can be seen singing chords from songs such as "Why Try" while practicing with the technologically advanced gloves. In another rehearsal video posted on the tour's official YouTube page, Grande shared the band arrangement of "One Last Time", the fifth and final single from My Everything, which includes an extended string introduction and a raised key change.

On February 25, 2015, Grande shared an Instagram video of a conversation between herself and her now-deceased grandfather, in which he gives her advice and shows support for her career. It was then revealed during the opening night show that the video is a part of a tribute dedicated to Grande's grandfather that takes place during every concert before she sings the ballad "My Everything". Also during the opening night of the tour, Cashmere Cat debuted a new collaboration between himself and Grande, which they had hinted at on Twitter weeks before the tour officially started. About a week after the tour had started, the song, officially titled "Adore", was released to iTunes and became available to stream on Vevo on March 3, 2015.

== Commercial reception ==
Shortly after the tickets for the first leg went on sale, Forbes noted increasingly huge ticket prices for the tour. Jesse Lawrence reported that the average ticket price for the tour was about $225 on the secondary market after a couple of days of being on sale. He also mentioned that the most expensive date for the tour was in New York City with a price of $341, which was 51% above the tour's ticket average on the secondary market. Also in his report, Lawrence mentioned that the cheapest show, in Dallas, had an average ticket price of $191, which was only 15% below the tour's average price per ticket on the secondary market. Also noted in the article was that the rising ticket prices of Grande's tour had surpassed the ticket prices of Katy Perry and Lady Gaga. Tickets for Perry's Prismatic World Tour (2014–2015) averaged about $216 on the secondary market, which was 4% below Grande's tour average, and tickets for Gaga's ArtRave: The Artpop Ball (2014) were about $169 per ticket on the secondary market, which was around 25% lower than Grande's tour average at the time.

In the following months, the average ticket prices began to drop gradually. In late September 2014, the average price on the secondary market was $201 according to TiqIQ. The most expensive date on the secondary market had changed from New York City to San Jose at $456 per ticket. In January 2015, it was reported that the average ticket price on the secondary market had dropped again, to about $178 per ticket on the secondary market. By February 2015, the average ticket price for Grande's tour dropped to $168 per ticket. The most expensive date shifted back to New York City and the least expensive date changed from Dallas to Independence, with a price of $91, which was 44% below the tour's average price at the time. In comparison to other pop stars, Grande fell behind the likes of Perry and Taylor Swift, but managed to top other artists such as Meghan Trainor. Trainor's That Bass Tour (2015) averaged about $147 per ticket on the secondary market, which was 12.5% below Grande's average price per ticket. At the other end of the spectrum, Perry's tickets increased slightly to an average of $221 and Swift's tickets for the 1989 World Tour (2015) were $294 per ticket on the secondary market.

At the end of 2015, the tour was placed at number 40 on Pollstar's "2015 Year-End Top 100 Worldwide Tours" list, grossing $41.8 million from 81 shows with a total attendance of 808,667.

== Critical response ==
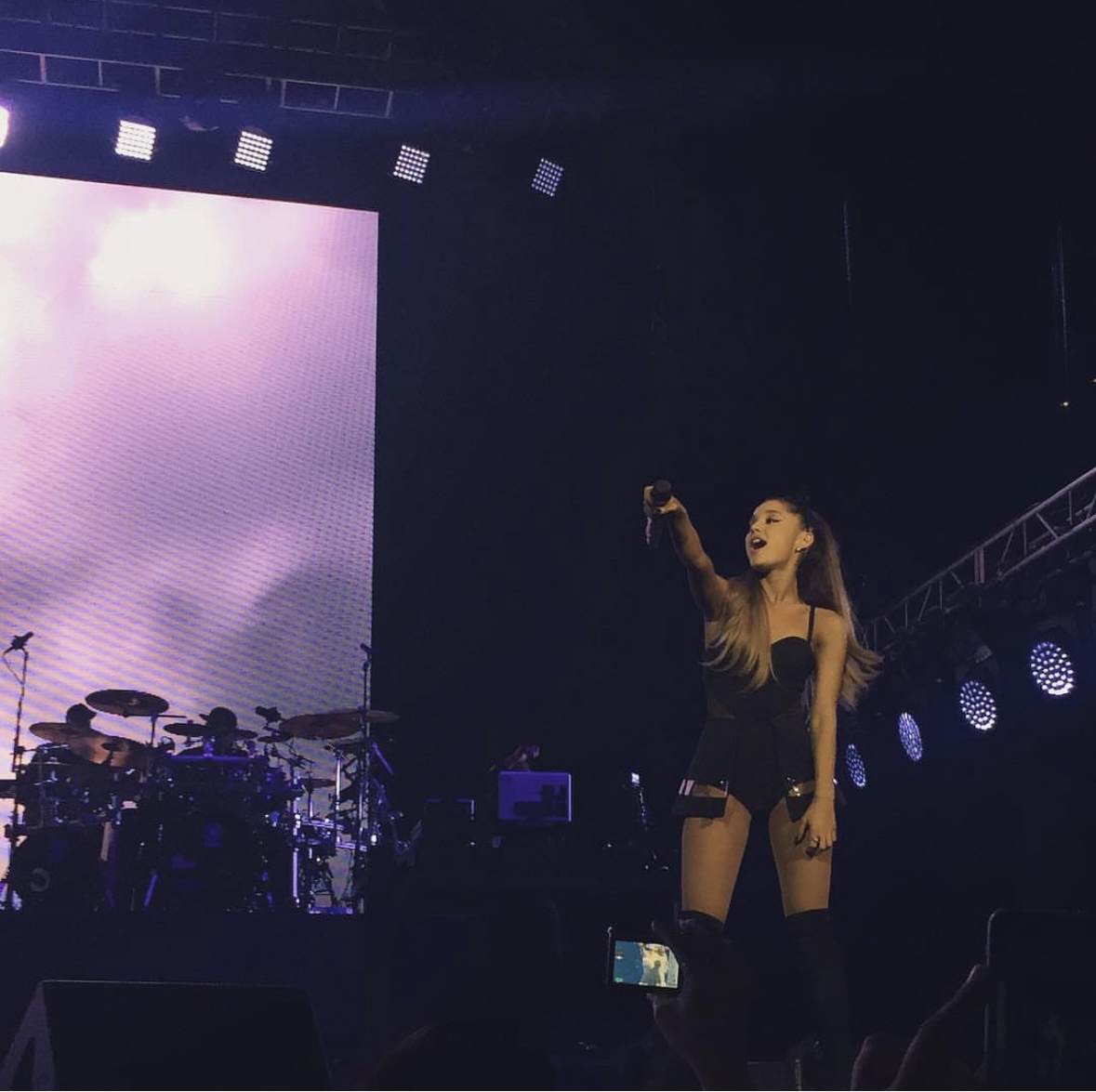
Grande performing "Best Mistake" in Manila

In a positive review of the opening show in Independence, Timothy Finn of The Kansas City Star praised Grande for her energy and enthusiasm when singing and dancing along with her crew. Finn described the show as an "extravagant mix of music, dance, lasers, videos, pyrotechnics, and costume changes, akin to the kinds of audio-visual spectacles delivered by fellow pop-divas like Katy Perry and Britney Spears". He also noted that, even though Grande claimed to be nervous, it did not show. One complaint made by Finn was the level of volume in the arena. He wrote, "The sound was an issue at times, mostly due to high volume." He went on to say, "During a few songs, it was so loud her voice was hard to hear over the music and other noise and lyrics were hard to decipher."

In another positive review, Jhon Moser of The Morning Call wrote, "Grande's concert at Philadelphia's was very good largely because of her voice," and said, "She's simply one of the most pristine, technically talented singers in all of music." Moser went on to say, "From the opening 'Bang Bang,' she immediately showed off her singing chops, offering skyrocket vocals amid actual fireworks." Moser enjoyed the show, but said "despite its grandeur, that presentation never upstaged the music. The biggest reason for that was that Grande's four-octave voice was more than grand in itself – high and clear, hitting an ethereal note, and even doing some speedy rapping, on "Be My Baby." Morse too praised Grande for her "stratospheric vocals" on Pink Champagne's performance. He continued on to say that "Grande clearly feels comfortable in her talent. She danced free-spirited and without inhibition, even in tall black heels on "Break Your Heart Right Back." Moser liked the idea of making a proper show, "she successfully walked the line between sensuous and appropriate for the largely young-teen audience" and said "she also succeeded in making the concert classy instead of hyper-sexualized as most post-Disney and Nickelodeon singers have".

Piet Levy of the Milwaukee Journal Sentinel criticized the show heavily by writing that Grande "isn't ready for the big leagues". Elaborating on his comment, Levy went on to say that the performance "didn't signify the birth of the next superstar. Most of the time, it felt like a dress rehearsal". Levy continued to pick apart the performance by stating it was "uninspired and misguided", while also commenting that Grande's "confused, uncertain, insecure" presence throughout the show. He also noted that Grande seemingly held back vocally on songs such as "Bang Bang" and "Why Try", which he also criticized for the use of the Mi.Mu Gloves writing, "Who honestly thought chopping up and electronically manipulating Grande's pretty voice was a good idea?" Despite the harsh criticism, Levy applauded Grande for her "sensational vocals" during performances of the ballads "My Everything" and "Just a Little Bit of Your Heart".

In another mixed review from Jon Bream of the Star Tribune, Bream simply stated, "Grande's not big enough to pull off [an] arena spectacle." He continued to say that the performance "was too busy, dimly lit and just ill conceived". He also felt that "the emphasis should have been on the vocals, Grande's forte, and not on overcooked attempts at pizazz". Then he said, praising the singer, "What you want from Grande in concert is grand vocalizing, that four-octave range cascading with deep emotion. At times, it was evident, especially when there were no dancers onstage." He went on to compare some of the tour's aspects to the likes of Katy Perry, Cher and Madonna, but not in a positive way. He also disliked the use of the Mi.Mu Gloves, writing, "With such a terrific voice in an era of few stand-out female voices, why would Grande want to muck things up with technology?" Bream too praised Grande for her outstanding vocals on the track "Just a Little Bit of Your Heart", writing, "It was her most focused and heartfelt vocal of the evening." Bream complimented Grande on her "prodigious pipes" during up-tempo pieces such as "Love Me Harder". "Grande displayed her prodigious pipes on up-tempo pieces, too, including "Love Me Harder", which started with her alone atop a pedestal that rose at the back of the stage."

== Set list ==
This set list is representative of the February 28, 2015, concert in Milwaukee. It does not represent all concerts for the duration of the tour.

1. "Bang Bang"
2. "Hands On Me"
3. "Best Mistake"
4. "Break Your Heart Right Back"
5. "Be My Baby"
6. "Right There"
7. "The Way"
8. "Pink Champagne"
9. "Tattooed Heart"
10. "One Last Time"
11. "Why Try"
12. "My Everything"
13. "Just a Little Bit of Your Heart"
14. "Love Me Harder"
15. "All My Love"
16. "Honeymoon Avenue"
17. "Break Free"
18. "Problem"

=== Notes ===
- During the shows in Rosemont, Worcester and Philadelphia, Grande joined Cashmere Cat during his opening set to perform "Adore".
- During the show on March 7 in Detroit, Grande was joined by Big Sean to perform "Best Mistake" and "Right There".
- Starting with the show on March 8 in Toronto, "Just a Little Bit of Your Heart" was removed from set list.
- Starting with the show on August 15 in Chiba, "Baby I" was added to the set list after "Hands On Me".
- Starting with the show on October 18 in Mexico City, "Why Try" and "All My Love" removed from the set list, and "Adore" was added after "My Everything".
- During the shows in Miami and Inglewood, Grande was joined onstage by Justin Bieber to perform "Love Me Harder", "All That Matters" (Miami only), "Where Are Ü Now" (Inglewood only, without Grande), and "As Long as You Love Me".
- During the show in Inglewood, Grande performed Whitney Houston's "I Have Nothing" and was accompanied by the song's co-writer and producer David Foster.
- During the second show in Paris, France on May 15, Grande was joined onstage by Kendji Girac to perform the French version of "One Last Time".
- During the shows in Barcelona, Mexico City, Santiago, and Buenos Aires, Grande performed the Spanglish version of "The Way".
- During the shows of the third leg and the Asian leg, Grande performs a mashup of Chaka Khan's "I'm Every Woman" and Madonna's "Vogue".
- During the show in Manila on August 23, Grande performed Whitney Houston's "I Have Nothing".
- Starting from the show in Houston, on September 18, Grande performed a mash-up of "One Last Time" and Justin Bieber's "What Do You Mean?".
- During the show in El Paso, Grande performed a cover of Imogen Heap's song "Hide and Seek", using MiMu Gloves given to her by Heap. In every other show in which she uses the "MiMu Gloves", she performs "Why Try".
- During the shows of the last leg, Grande played a snippet of her then-upcoming single "Focus" after "Be My Baby".

== Shows ==
List of concerts
Date (2015)	City	Country	Venue	Opening act	Attendance	Revenue
February 25	Independence	United States	Independence Events Center	Rixton; Cashmere Cat	5,594 / 5,594	$305,063
February 28	Milwaukee	United States	BMO Harris Bradley Center	Rixton; Cashmere Cat	10,411 / 10,411	$484,877
March 1	Saint Paul	United States	Xcel Energy Center	Rixton; Cashmere Cat	11,272 / 11,272	$596,866
March 3	Rosemont (Note: Labeled as Chicago in promotional material)	United States	Allstate Arena	Rixton; Cashmere Cat	12,470 / 12,470	$635,053
March 5	Cleveland	United States	Quicken Loans Arena	Rixton; Cashmere Cat	11,553 / 11,553	$604,962
March 7	Detroit	United States	Joe Louis Arena	Rixton; Cashmere Cat	14,505 / 14,505	$659,749
March 8	Toronto	Canada	Air Canada Centre	Rixton; Cashmere Cat	13,666 / 13,666	$493,989
March 10	Pittsburgh	United States	Petersen Events Center	Rixton; Cashmere Cat	8,149 / 8,149	$427,937
March 12	Philadelphia	United States	Wells Fargo Center	Rixton; Cashmere Cat	14,334 / 14,334	$778,265
March 14	Uncasville	United States	Mohegan Sun Arena	Rixton; Cashmere Cat	7,347 / 7,347	$326,102
March 15	Worcester	United States	DCU Center	Rixton; Cashmere Cat	10,337 / 10,337	$517,105
March 17 (Note: The March 17, 2015 concert in Houston at NRG Stadium was part of the 2015 Rodeo Houston)	Houston	United States	NRG Stadium	Rixton; Cashmere Cat	75,068 / 75,068	$8,407,728
March 20	New York City	United States	Madison Square Garden	Rixton; Cashmere Cat	28,520 / 28,520	$1,455,12
March 21	New York City	United States	Madison Square Garden	Rixton; Cashmere Cat	28,520 / 28,520	$1,455,12
March 24	Atlanta	United States	Philips Arena	Rixton; Cashmere Cat	9,271 / 9,271	$510,404
March 26	Orlando	United States	Amway Center	Rixton; Cashmere Cat	12,661 / 12,661	$609,739
March 28	Miami	United States	American Airlines Arena	Rixton; Cashmere Cat	13,646 / 13,646	$663,521
March 31	San Antonio	United States	AT&T Center	Rixton; Cashmere Cat	11,319 / 11,319	$544,146
April 1	Dallas	United States	American Airlines Center	Rixton; Cashmere Cat	15,248 / 15,248	$602,533
April 3	Oklahoma City	United States	Chesapeake Energy Arena	Rixton; Cashmere Cat	9,526 / 9,526	$461,343
April 6	Phoenix	United States	Talking Stick Resort Arena	Rixton; Cashmere Cat	12,530 / 12,530	$600,285
April 8	Inglewood (Note: Labeled as Los Angeles in promotional material)	United States	The Forum	Rixton; Cashmere Cat	11,605 / 11,605	$534,176
April 10	Anaheim	United States	Honda Center	Rixton; Cashmere Cat	12,160 / 12,160	$581,827
April 12	San Jose (Note: Labeled as San Francisco in promotional material)	United States	SAP Center	Rixton; Cashmere Cat	12,717 / 12,717	$651,429
April 14	Seattle	United States	KeyArena	Rixton; Cashmere Cat	11,648 / 11,648	$508,121
April 16	Vancouver	Canada	Rogers Arena	Rixton; Cashmere Cat	13,210 / 13,210	$477,295
May 14	Paris	France	Zénith Paris	Rixton	12,000 / 12,000	$765,096
May 15	Paris	France	Zénith Paris	Rixton	12,000 / 12,000	$765,096
May 19	Berlin	Germany	Max-Schmeling-Halle	Rixton	10,585 / 10,585	$667,786
May 21	Stockholm	Sweden	Ericsson Globe	Rixton	11,582 / 11,582	$786,585
May 22	Oslo	Norway	Oslo Spektrum	Rixton	6,865 / 6,865	$444,754
May 25	Milan	Italy	Mediolanum Forum	Rixton	9,796 / 9,796	$657,585
May 28	Amsterdam	Netherlands	Ziggo Dome	Rixton	32,941 / 32,941	$1,859,574
May 29	Amsterdam	Netherlands	Ziggo Dome	Rixton	32,941 / 32,941	$1,859,574
June 1	London	England	The O_{2} Arena	Rixton	13,841 / 13,841	$762,868
June 4	Manchester	England	Manchester Arena	Rixton	11,765 / 11,765	$613,272
June 6 (Note: The June 6, 2015, concert in London at Wembley Stadium was part of the 2015 Summertime Ball.)	London	England	Wembley Stadium	Rixton	—N/a	—N/a
June 8	Glasgow	Scotland	SSE Hydro	Krishane; Melissa Steel	10,789 / 10,792	$555,723
June 9	Birmingham	England	Arena Birmingham	Krishane; Melissa Steel	11,474 / 11,474	$439,202
June 12	Antwerp	Belgium	Sportpaleis	Alvar & Millas	14,514 / 14,514	$563,577
June 13	Cologne	Germany	Lanxess Arena	DJ Dubz	12,927 / 12,927	$797,379
June 16	Barcelona	Spain	Palau Sant Jordi	Paula Rojo	14,007 / 14,014	$894,152
June 28 (Note: The June 28, 2015 concert in New York City at Pier 26 was part of the 2015 LGBT Pride.)	New York City	United States	Pier 26	—N/a	—N/a	—N/a
July 16	Tampa	United States	Amalie Arena	Prince Royce	7,214 / 7,214	$306,261
July 18	Sunrise	United States	BB&T Center	Prince Royce	—N/a	—N/a
July 21	Charlotte	United States	Time Warner Cable Arena	Prince Royce	—N/a	—N/a
July 23	Louisville	United States	KFC Yum! Center	Prince Royce	—N/a	—N/a
July 25	Washington, D.C.	United States	Verizon Center	Prince Royce	10,361 / 10,361	$515,683
July 26	Hershey	United States	Hersheypark Stadium	Prince Royce	—N/a	—N/a
July 29	Philadelphia	United States	Wells Fargo Center	Prince Royce	—N/a	—N/a
July 31	Albany	United States	Times Union Center	Prince Royce	—N/a	—N/a
August 2	Uncasville	United States	Mohegan Sun Arena	Prince Royce	7,131 / 7,131	$470,758
August 4	Manchester	United States	Verizon Wireless Arena	Prince Royce	—N/a	—N/a
August 6	Montreal	Canada	Bell Centre	Prince Royce	10,533 / 10,533	$502,087
August 7	Ottawa	Canada	Canadian Tire Centre	Prince Royce	—N/a	—N/a
August 9	Toronto	Canada	Air Canada Centre	Prince Royce	10,703 / 10,703	$453,447
August 15 (Note: The August 15, 2015 concert in Chiba, Japan at the Chiba Marine Stadium and the August 16, 2015 concert in Osaka, Japan at the Maishima Sports Island were both part of the Summer Sonic Festival.)	Chiba (Note: Labeled as Tokyo in promotional material)	Japan	Chiba Marine Stadium	—N/a	—N/a	—N/a
August 16	Osaka	Japan	Maishima Sports Island	—N/a	—N/a	—N/a
August 19	Tokyo	Japan	Tokyo International Forum	—N/a	—N/a	—N/a
August 23	Manila	Philippines	Mall of Asia Arena	Tom Taus	—N/a	—N/a
August 26	Jakarta	Indonesia	Jakarta International Expo	—N/a	—N/a	—N/a
August 29	Las Vegas	United States	Mandalay Bay Events Center	Prince Royce	—N/a	—N/a
August 31	Fresno	United States	Save Mart Center	Prince Royce	10,710 / 10,710	$416,264
September 2	Boise	United States	Taco Bell Arena	Prince Royce	—N/a	—N/a
September 4	Portland	United States	Moda Center	Prince Royce	—N/a	—N/a
September 8	Mountain View	United States	Shoreline Amphitheatre	Prince Royce	—N/a	—N/a
September 9	Chula Vista (Note: Labeled as San Diego in promotional material)	United States	Sleep Train Amphitheatre	Prince Royce	—N/a	—N/a
September 10 (Note: The September 10, 2015 concert in Sacramento at the Sleep Train Arena was originally planned for September 6, but was rescheduled due to Grande's illness.)	Sacramento	United States	Sleep Train Arena	Prince Royce	—N/a	—N/a
September 11	Los Angeles	United States	Staples Center	Prince Royce	13,745 / 13,745	$653,203
September 18	Houston	United States	Toyota Center	Prince Royce; Who Is Fancy	10,124 / 10,124	$557,714
September 20	Birmingham	United States	Legacy Arena	Prince Royce; Who Is Fancy	—N/a	—N/a
September 22	Nashville	United States	Bridgestone Arena	Prince Royce; Who Is Fancy	8,045 / 8,045	$304,405
September 24	Raleigh	United States	PNC Arena	Prince Royce; Who Is Fancy	—N/a	—N/a
September 26	New York City (Note: Labeled as Brooklyn in promotional material)	United States	Barclays Center	Prince Royce; Who Is Fancy	21,510 / 21,510	$1,127,406
September 27	New York City	United States	Barclays Center	Prince Royce; Who Is Fancy	21,510 / 21,510	$1,127,406
September 29	Grand Rapids	United States	Van Andel Arena	Prince Royce; Who Is Fancy	7,822 / 7,822	$373,754
October 2	Chicago	United States	United Center	Prince Royce; Who Is Fancy	—N/a	—N/a
October 4	St. Louis	United States	Scottrade Center	Prince Royce; Who Is Fancy	—N/a	—N/a
October 6	Wichita	United States	Intrust Bank Arena	Prince Royce; Who Is Fancy	10,884 / 10,884	$371,124
October 7	Tulsa	United States	BOK Center	Prince Royce; Who Is Fancy	—N/a	—N/a
October 9	New Orleans	United States	Smoothie King Center	Prince Royce; Who Is Fancy	—N/a	—N/a
October 11	Dallas	United States	American Airlines Center	Prince Royce; Who Is Fancy	9,653 / 9,653	$377,291
October 13	Austin	United States	Frank Erwin Center	Prince Royce	8,632 / 8,632	$351,128
October 15	El Paso	United States	El Paso County Coliseum	Prince Royce	—N/a	—N/a
October 18	Mexico City	Mexico	Palacio de los Deportes	DJ Dubz	15,349 / 15,349	$1,074,116
October 21	Santiago	Chile	Movistar Arena	—N/a	10,000 / 10,000	$2,570,000
October 23	Buenos Aires	Argentina	Complejo al Río	Olivia Viggiano	56,788 / 56,788	$6,789,000
October 25	São Paulo	Brazil	Allianz Parque	—N/a	23,560 / 23,560	$1,834,765

== Cancelled shows ==
List of cancelled concerts, showing date, city, country, venue and reason for cancellation
Date (2015)	City	Country	Venue	Reason
March 17	Fairfax	United States	Patriot Center	Prior commitments with RodeoHouston
April 3	Houston	United States	Toyota Center	Prior commitments with RodeoHouston
July 11	Cincinnati	United States	Paul Brown Stadium	Wisdom teeth removal, replaced by Demi Lovato
October 29	San Juan	Puerto Rico	Coliseo de Puerto Rico	Scheduling conflicts
December 3	Abu Dhabi	United Arab Emirates	Du Arena	Inconvenience
December 8	Saitama	Japan	Saitama Super Arena	Inconvenience
December 9	Saitama	Japan	Saitama Super Arena	Inconvenience
