= Best Mistake =

Promotional single by Ariana Grande featuring Big Sean

from the album My Everything
- Released: August 12, 2014
- Recorded: 2014
- Studio: DOE
- Genre: R&B; hip hop
- Length: 3:53
- Label: Republic
- Songwriters: Sean Anderson; Dwane Weir; Ariana Grande
- Producer: Key Wane

Ariana Grande promotional singles chronology
"Almost Is Never Enough" (2013)	"Best Mistake" (2014)	"Be Alright" (2016)

"Best Mistake" is a song by American singer Ariana Grande that features American hip-hop rapper Big Sean. The song served as a promotional single from Grande's second studio album, My Everything (2014), and was released at midnight on August 12, 2014. Written by Big Sean, Grande, and Key Wane with production being done by the latter, the song is a ballad with piano, string, and drum machine instrumentation that lyrically deals with a couple trying to decide on what their future, troubled relationship is going to be like.

Commercially, it peaked on the US Billboard Hot 100 at number 49, and within the top 50 on other record charts in North America, Europe, and Oceania. On the US Digital Songs chart, it debuted at number six, making Grande the first act since Michael Jackson, and also the first female artist, to have three songs in the top ten on that chart the same week, with the other two songs being "Bang Bang" (with Jessie J and Nicki Minaj) and "Break Free" (featuring Zedd). Grande and Big Sean have performed the song live, including at the iHeartRadio theater in Los Angeles.

== Production and composition ==
"Best Mistake" was written by Ariana Grande, Big Sean and Key Wane, with production, programming and instruments done by the latter. The vocals were produced by Curtis "Sauce" Wilson, with Gregg Rominiecki engineering Big Sean's vocals. Serban Ghenea handled the mixing of the track, which was engineered by John Hanes, and finally the mix was mastered by Aya Merrill and Tom Coyne. It is a minimal hip-hop piano ballad lament that uses instrumentation from strings and a drum machine. It is about a couple trying to "make up their minds about the future of their relationship, with deep affection buried underneath their problems." Grande revealed that "Best Mistake" was her favorite track on My Everything: "I just think the world of [Big Sean] and I'm obsessed with his writing on this song in particular. I'm a huge fan of his in general but I feel like his writing on this song is so, so fantastic, it like strikes a chord in my heart. I love it so much."

== Release ==
Grande first confirmed the title of "Best Mistake" on June 28, 2014, the same day that she confirmed the name of her second studio album, My Everything. On July 8, 2014, Grande released a 15-second snippet of "Best Mistake" onto her Instagram profile. The song finally came out on August 12, and the release added more speculation to the relationship rumors between Grande and Big Sean.

== Critical reception ==
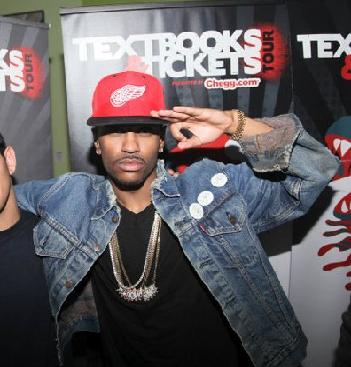
Big Sean's verse on "Best Mistake" garnered mixed reviews.

Evan Sawdey of PopMatters called it the second best song from My Everything, coming close to "Love Me Harder", and Bustle writer Kadeen Griffiths called it "one of Grande's best love songs so far." HollywoodLife's Caitlin Beck said it was "sure to be another hit!" Carolyn Menyes of the Music Times applauded Grande for her calming vocals and transition into a more mature sound of music. Billboard's Jason Lipshutz called the production "impressive" and said the song "rows stickier upon each listen". Digital Spy writer Lewis Corner and Entertainmentwise's Shaun Kitchener noted the song showed her R&B roots, the latter stating that it "wouldn't have sounded out of place on Kelly Rowland's under-rated last album [Talk a Good Game]." The Official Charts Company critic Rob Copsey felt it was "like an extension of Yours Truly, albeit moodier and more grown up." Brennan Carley of Spin called it "classic Grande, eshcewing any of the bells and whistles that she's fond of, instead focusing entirely on her carefully sung vocals and the quiet piano line in the song's background." Newsday critic Glenn Gamboa described "Best Mistake" as a "gorgeous hip-hop" song that "showcases her wide-ranging voice, without focusing on the upper notes too much." Sydney Gore of The 405 called it an improvement of the two's previous collaboration "Right There", writing that "the singer and rapper serenade us on the grounds that sneaking around with each other was the best mistake they ever made."

There were, however, some mixed reviews of "Best Mistake". Andrew Chan ofSlant Magazine said it "makes the mistake of hemming her into her frail middle register, where she has a habit of delivering every word as if it were a pout." Big Sean's appearance on "Best Mistake" also got varied reception. Pitchfork Media's Meaghan Garvey said his rap on the track made "a mockery of the song's serious tone with hysterically awful lines like "How can we keep the feelings fresh/ How do we Ziploc it?"" Lipshutz found his verse "unnecessary, yet [it] has morphed into an interesting confessional now that the dating rumors are on." Sawdey called it a "pretty outstanding verse," with "his own voice never overpowering the sparse atmosphere, his rhymes measured and metered in a way that fits the song perfectly", while James Shotwell of Under the Gun Review said "Grande is a treat, but I think it's Big Sean who steals the show."

== Commercial performance ==
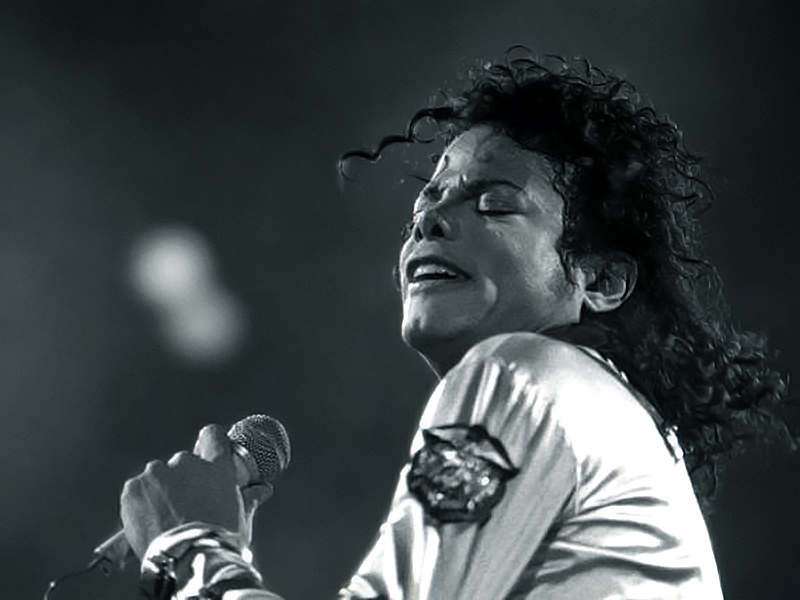
With "Best Mistake", Grande became the first act since Michael Jackson (pictured in 1988) to have three songs in the top ten of the US Digital Songs chart on the same week.

In the United States, shortly after its release, the song reached number two on the weekly Billboard Twitter Real-Time chart and topped the iTunes singles chart. It sold 104,000 digital downloads in its first week, landing at number six on the Digital Songs chart. This made Grande the first female to have three songs in the top ten on that chart, the other two being "Bang Bang" and "Break Free." The last artist to do this was Michael Jackson, shortly after his death, on the issue dated July 18, 2009. The sales of "Best Mistake" also helped it land at number 49 on the US Billboard Hot 100 In Canada, the track appeared on the Canadian Hot 100 at number 39.

In European nations, "Best Mistake" debuted at number 49 and 10 on the Flanders Ultratop 50 and Urban chart respectively, number 29 on the Danish Tracklisten chart, 23 on the Finnish Singles Chart, 103 on the French SNEP chart, 5 on the Billboard Greek Digital chart, 67 on the Netherlands Mega Single Top 100, 35 on the Spain PROMUSICAE chart, and number 154 on the UK Singles Chart. In Oceania, it reached number 45 and 19 on the Australian ARIA pop and urban songs chart respectively, and 29 on the Official New Zealand Music Chart. On the Billboard Japan Hot 100, it peaked at the 74th spot. As of Year-End 2016, Best Mistake has sold 684,337 digital downloads in South Korea, according to Gaon Music Chart.

== Live performances ==
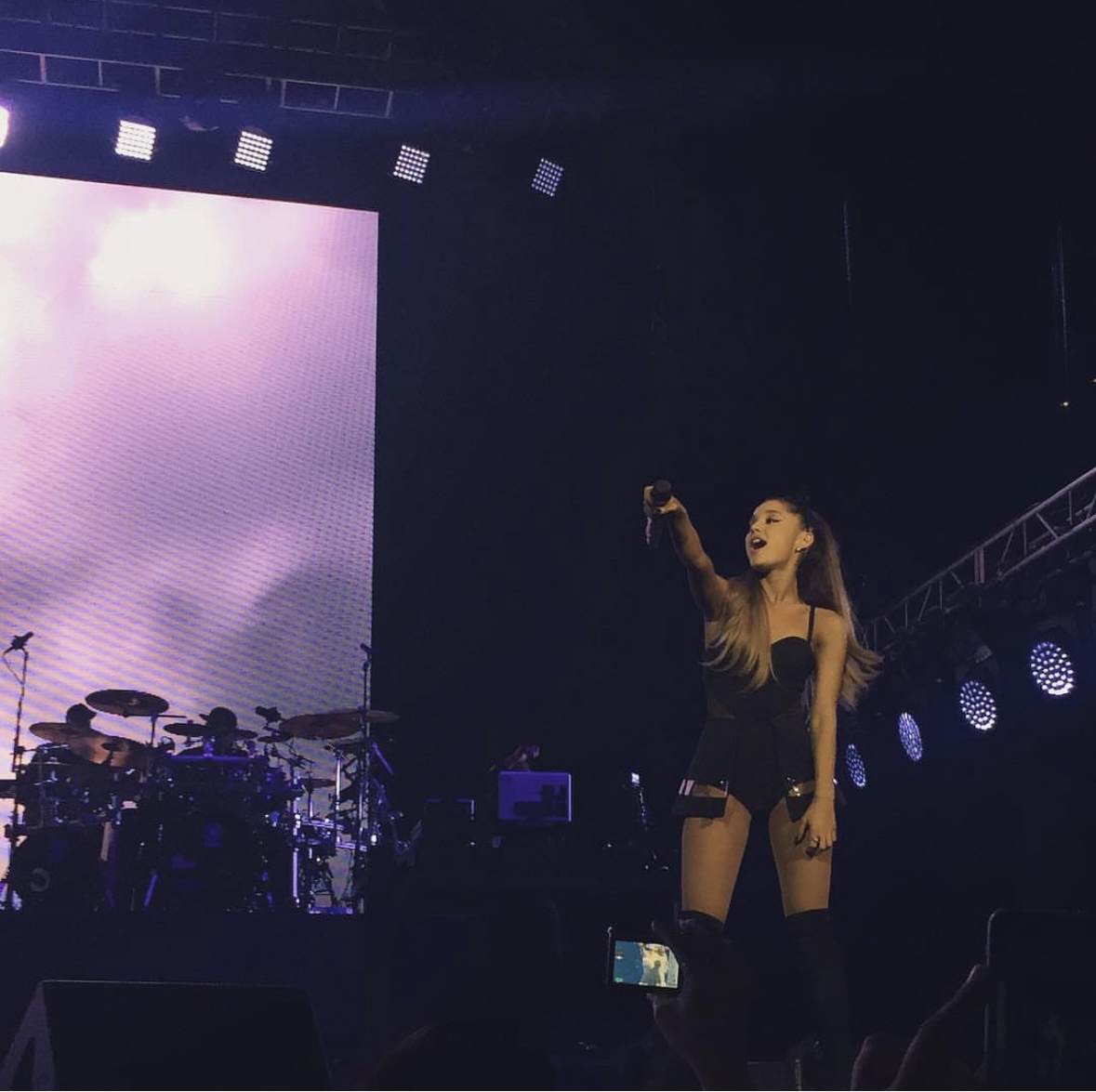
Grande performing "Best Mistake" during The Honeymoon Tour in Manila, 2015

In 2014, Grande and Big Sean performed "Best Mistake" on the Honda Stage at the iHeartRadio Theater in Los Angeles. They also performed "Best Mistake" at A Very Grammy Christmas on November 18, 2014. Grande also performed the song during The Honeymoon Tour. Big Sean performed the song with her at the tour's stop in Detroit. An a cappella version of "Best Mistake" was performed during two shows of The Sweetener Sessions in 2018.

== Credits and personnel ==
Credits are adapted from the liner notes of My Everything.

- Songwriting, vocals – Ariana Grande, Sean Anderson ("Big Sean")
- Songwriting, production, programming, instruments – Key Wane
- Vocal production – Curtis Wilson ("Sauce")
- Big Sean Vocal engineering – Greg Rominiecki
- Mixing – Serban Ghenea
- Mix engineering – John Hanes
- Mastering – Aya Merrill, Tom Coyne

== Charts ==
=== Weekly charts ===
Chart (2014–18)	Peak position
Australia (ARIA)	45
Australia Urban (ARIA)	14
Belgium (Ultratop 50 Flanders)	49
Belgium Urban (Ultratop Flanders)	10
Canada Hot 100 (Billboard)	39
Czech Republic Singles Digital (ČNS IFPI)	46
Denmark (Tracklisten)	29
Finland Download (Latauslista)	23
France (SNEP)	103
Greece (Billboard)	5
Japan Hot 100 (Billboard)	74
Netherlands (Single Top 100)	67
New Zealand (Recorded Music NZ)	29
Slovakia Singles Digital (ČNS IFPI)	59
South Korea International Chart (Gaon)	3
Spain (Promusicae)	34
UK Singles (Official Charts Company)	154
US Billboard Hot 100	49

=== Year-end charts ===
Chart (2015)	Position
South Korea International Chart (Gaon)	13

Chart (2016)	Position
South Korea International Chart (Gaon)	17

Chart (2017)	Position
South Korea International Chart (Gaon)	46

== Certifications ==
Certifications for "Best Mistake"
Region	Certification	Certified units/sales
Australia (ARIA)	Gold	35,000^{‡}
Brazil (Pro-Música Brasil)	Gold	30,000^{‡}
New Zealand (RMNZ)	Gold	15,000^{‡}
United Kingdom (BPI)	Silver	200,000^{‡}
United States (RIAA)	Platinum	1,000,000^{‡}
^{‡} Sales+streaming figures based on certification alone.
