= The Listening Sessions =

2013 concert tour by Ariana Grande

- Tour by Ariana Grande
- Promotional poster
- Location: North America
- Associated album: Yours Truly
- Start date: August 13, 2013
- End date: September 22, 2013
- Legs: 1
- No. of shows: 11
- Box office: $679,360 ($939.86 thousand in 2025 dollars)

Ariana Grande concert chronology
- The Listening Sessions (2013); The Honeymoon Tour (2015)

The Listening Sessions was the debut concert tour by American singer Ariana Grande. The tour supported Grande's debut studio album, Yours Truly (2013), which was released September 3, 2013. The tour began on August 11, 2013 in Silver Spring, Maryland and concluded September 22, 2013 in New Albany, Ohio and showcased all of the material from Grande's debut studio album, with the exception of "Popular Song". The tour grossed $679,360 from 11 shows across North America. The tour was said to expand after the release of Yours Truly, but failed to materialize due to Grande's filming schedule for Sam & Cat and recording sessions for her second studio album, My Everything.

== Background ==
On July 15, 2013, the same day that "Baby I" was announced, Grande announced that she would be going on her debut concert tour in August of that year. Grande said she chose the name "The Listening Sessions" because she would only be playing a handful of small intimate venues and fans would be hearing the music from the album before it was released. Pre-sale tickets went on sale on Thursday, July 18. Regular tickets went on sale on Friday, July 19, 2013. Pre-sale tickets had to be taken down early, as they were selling at such a fast rate that the tour was almost sold out before regular tickets were available.

== Set list ==
This set list is representative of the show on August 17, 2013. It does not represent all concerts for the duration of the tour.

1. "Baby I"
2. "Lovin' It"
3. "You'll Never Know"
4. "Honeymoon Avenue"
5. "Tattooed Heart"
6. "Better Left Unsaid"
7. "Daydreamin'"
8. "Almost Is Never Enough"
9. "Piano"
10. "Right There"
11. "The Way"
- During the performance in Los Angeles, Grande was joined by Big Sean to perform their song "Right There", while Mac Miller also assisted Grande in performing "The Way".
- During the performance in New York City, Grande performed an unreleased song entitled "Higher".
- During the performances in Toronto, Rosemont, and Royal Oak, Grande was joined by Nathan Sykes to perform their duet "Almost Is Never Enough".

== Shows ==
List of concerts, showing date, city, country, venue, tickets sold, number of available tickets, and gross revenue
Date (2013)	City	Country	Venue	Attendance	Revenue
August 13	Silver Spring	United States	The Fillmore Silver Spring	2,000 / 2,000 (100%)	$59,040
August 14	New York City	United States	Best Buy Theater	2,027 / 2,027 (100%)	$71,041
August 16	Philadelphia	United States	Electric Factory	2,341 / 2,341 (100%)	$69,195
August 17	Red Bank	United States	Count Basie Theatre	1,474 / 1,474 (100%)	$51,590
August 18	Lowell	United States	Lowell Memorial Auditorium	2,692 / 2,692 (100%)	$79,414
August 27	Toronto	Canada	Sound Academy	2,586 / 2,586 (100%)	$79,960
August 28	Royal Oak	United States	Royal Oak Music Theatre	1,694 / 1,694 (100%)	$50,106
August 29	Rosemont	United States	Rosemont Theatre	2,291 / 2,291 (100%)	$80,185
August 31	Kansas City	United States	Midland Theatre	1,545 / 1,545 (100%)	$50,700
September 9	Los Angeles	United States	Club Nokia	2,351 / 2,351 (100%)	$88,736
September 22	New Albany	United States	New Albany Classic	4,260 / 4,260 (100%)	$120,033
Total				25,261 / 25,261 (100%)	$679,360
