= Baby I =

Single by Ariana Grande

from the album Yours Truly
- Released: July 22, 2013
- Recorded: 2012
- Studio: Brandon's Way (Los Angeles, California)
- Genre: Pop; R&B
- Length: 3:17
- Label: Republic
- Songwriters: Kenneth "Babyface" Edmonds; Antonio Dixon; Patrick "J.Que" Smith
- Producers: Kenneth "Babyface" Edmonds; Antonio Dixon

Ariana Grande singles chronology
"The Way" (2013)	"Baby I" (2013)	"Right There" (2013)

Music video
- "Baby I" on YouTube

"Baby I" is a song by American singer-songwriter Ariana Grande. It was released on July 22, 2013, by Republic Records as the second single from her debut studio album, Yours Truly (2013). The song was written by Kenneth "Babyface" Edmonds, Antonio Dixon and Patrick "J.Que" Smith, and produced by the first two. "Baby I" is a pop and R&B song with drums, horns and a syncopated beat. It also contains an uptempo '90s-inspired beat. Lyrically, the song is about not being able to fully express your feelings towards someone you love. The song was well received by music critics, who complimented the song's "throwback" sound, while others praised Grande's vocals, which were compared to those of Mariah Carey.

The song was serviced to contemporary hit radio in the United States on August 8, 2013. Commercially, it debuted on the Billboard Hot 100 at its peak position of number 21, mainly due to the strong digital sales. It stayed on the chart for three non-consecutive weeks. Internationally, the song entered record charts of several countries, including Australia, Canada and the Netherlands. The single experienced particular success in Japan, reaching number six there and earning a Gold certification by the RIAJ. "Baby I" has also been certified Platinum by the RIAA.

It was accompanied by a music video directed by Ryan Pallotta and filmed in the Koreatown neighborhood of Los Angeles. It was released on Grande's Vevo channel on September 5, 2013. The video was well received by critics who highlighted Grande's styling and the video's concept. According to Grande, she wanted to emulate "the breeziness of early 90s music videos" and cited the style of actor Will Smith and the group TLC as two sources of inspiration. The video for the song features Grande dancing in the streets while wearing a top and shorts.

== Background and release ==
I love that. It felt like '90s, Aaliyah, Destiny's Child. I like that it has that throwback feeling to it, and that's when I grew up and it was such a feel-good song to me. And I love what it says. I love it's about loving somebody so much that you just don't know what to say. I think that's really cute. I laughed the first time I heard the lyrics. I like that I get to sing a little more on it ... It's quirky.

— Grande, on the song during an interview with MTV

"Baby I" was written by Kenneth Edmonds, commonly known as Babyface, Antonio Dixon and Patrick "J. Que" Smith, while the song's production was handled by the former two. The song was originally written by Babyface for Beyoncé; however, she rejected it. During sessions at Brandon's Way Recording Studios in Los Angeles, Babyface played the song to Grande, she immediately agreed to record the song. Following its recording, the song was mixed by Jaycen Joshua at Larrabee Studios and mastered by Tom Coyne and Aya Marrill at Sterling Sound. "Baby I" was released in the United States in digital download format on July 22, 2013, by Republic Records and was sent to US contemporary hit radios on August 6, 2013, by the same label. In an interview with Complex, Grande stated that it was actually Mac Miller who picked "Baby I" to be the second single from her album. Despite her disbelief in releasing it as the second single, she enjoys the recording, since it is reminiscent of Dreamgirls.

Grande also opined that "Baby I" was more "sophisticated" and "mature" and showed off her musicality and vocals more than her previous hit single "The Way", which was part of what made her excited to release the song. It was released as a bonus track for the Japanese version of Grande's sophomore album My Everything, featuring Japanese musician Taro Hakase. The song features new arrangements in the background instrumental, with Hakase playing violin during the whole song. This version was the second credits theme for the 2014–2015 anime series GO-GO Tamagotchi!, making it the only song in that series not to be sung in Japanese.

== Composition ==
"Baby I" (2013)
A 19-second sample of the song's chorus, where Grande sings over an uptempo drumbeat, with backing vocals harmonizing her voice. Several critics noted the 90's influences.

"Baby I" is an uptempo pop and R&B song that runs for three minutes and seventeen seconds. According to the music sheet published by Sony Music Publishing, "Baby I" is written in the key of D♭ major and set in a 4/4 time signature at a moderate tempo of 100 beats per minute. Grande's vocal range spans from the low note D♭_{4} to the high note G♭_{6}. The song includes horns (such as trumpet, saxophone, and trombone) and a syncopated beat. A writer from Rap-Up described the track as a "summertime record" which features Grande's "big vocals" over a "breezy beat". Similarly, MTV's Jenna Rubenstein agreed noting that the track is "set to a syncopated, breezy, summery, R&B-tinged beat." Several critics noted the 90's influences not only in this track, but also in the album.

Lyrically, the song is "a confession on Grande's behalf admitting a special love for someone and how she can't formulate her strong feelings into words." Regarding this matter, Grande said that she could relate to the song's lyrics because she is "so awkward and so flustered." Also, the song's composition has a remix of Deep Note from THX.

== Critical reception ==
"Baby I" received generally positive reviews from most music critics. Sam Lansky of the website Idolator opined that Grande succeeded in "meeting the bar where she set it with her debut," while praising her "extraordinary vocal performance" and describing her vocal runs as "nothing short of everything." He also stated, "Comparisons to Mariah Carey are starting to grow tiresome, but truly — who else has a range like that?" Kyle Anderson of Entertainment Weekly praised the production of "Baby I" dubbing it as a throwback and felt that the song argued Grande as "the new Mariah". Pitchfork's Andrew Ryce gave a positive review to the song and believed that "Baby I" is "most representative of where Grande is at this stage in her career." Ryce also noted a diversity of characteristics presents in the track, "from its Britney-esque "yeah yeah yeahs" to the punchy horn riffs that somehow melt into a staggered hip-hop verse," and further opined that "Grande's boundless energy means she can power through like no one else", by using her voice as if it was nothing.

Reviewing the album Yours Truly, an editor from Sputnikmusic felt that "Baby I" as well as "The Way" "are the only sections he genuinely enjoyed and revisited countless times." Digital Spy's Lewis Corner commented that "is an infectiously bouncy jam of love-struck jitters." Analysing the album, Gregory Rich of The Michigan Daily thought that "most tracks are of quality composition, lyrically and melodically, but beat usage becomes excessive at times." He also said that "Baby I exploits nearly every beat in existence, resulting in messiness." Writing for MTV, Jenna Hally Rubenstein praised the vocal performance explored in the song comparing to Grande's previous single, according to her, while "The Way" "set the bar pretty high for Ariana", "Baby I," "sets the bar even higher" and referred to the song as "a more than worthy followup."

== Commercial performance ==
In the United States, "Baby I" debuted on the Billboard Hot 100 at number 21, for the week ending August 10, 2013, making it her second top 40 single after "The Way". "Baby I" sold 141,000 digital downloads during its first week of availability, allowing the song to debut at number six on the US Billboard Hot Digital Songs chart, making Grande the only female artist to have multiple top-ten debuts on said chart in 2013. Following the release of its music video, "Baby I" re-entered the Billboard Hot 100 chart at number 94, rising to number 60 the following week. On the US Dance Club Songs chart, the song peaked at number 18 after charting for ten weeks. It also reached number 28 on Rhythmic chart. Almost five years after its release, "Baby I" was certified Platinum by the RIAA in March 2018.

In Canada, "Baby I" debuted on the Canadian Hot 100 at its peak position of number 57 for the week marked at August 10, 2013 following its release. In the United Kingdom, "Baby I" entered the UK R&B Chart at number 26 following the album release. In Australia, "Baby I" debuted at number 67 on August 3, 2013, on the ARIA Charts.

In Japan, "Baby I" also saw commercial success, reaching a peak of number six on the Japan Hot 100 for the issue dated February 22, 2014, while topping the Japan Hot Overseas chart, making it her first top-ten hit in the former. On the Japanese year-end charts of 2014, the song was placed at number 38. It was also certified gold by the RIAJ.

== Music video ==
Grande said that she wanted the video to emulate the "breeziness" of early 1990s music videos released by TLC and Will Smith.

Filming for the song's music video took place July 28–29, 2013. Grande hinted that the video would "travel" back to the 1990s and that there would be "lots of color" and "lots of baggy clothes." A teaser video was posted onto Grande's personal YouTube channel on September 5, 2013. The official music video was released on September 6 on her Vevo account. The video surpassed 100 million views on July 13, 2015, making it Grande's seventh Vevo-certified music video. As of December 2025, the music video has been viewed nearly 200 million times on YouTube.

According to Christina Garibaldi from MTV, the video "takes a page straight out of the '90s, from the overalls to the graphic T's and mismatched prints. All they missed were the snap bracelets." Speaking about the video concept to Billboard, Grande said:

It's like a 90's, throwback-type vibe, when I said 'I want it to look like this,' I said like a TLC, Fresh Prince type vibe. I was like, 'Let's just get really silly, 90's amazing outfits, and just go out and dance around and have fun.

The video begins with Grande arriving at a party. For the first verse, the singer appears accompanied by her friends shutting down the block as she rocks a pair of short shorts and a midriff-baring top which according to Garibaldi, is reminiscent of Mariah Carey's ensemble in the 1995 "Fantasy" video. Halfway through the video, another scene is introduced, with Grande dancing and singing in the streets with a "frilly top and high-waist shorts on." Lucas Villa from AXS noted that Grande dances in a New York City street. She also appears with her dancers singing in a bus. Eventually Grande makes her way back to the house party, which is complete with "inflatable microphones and boom boxes."

== Live performances ==
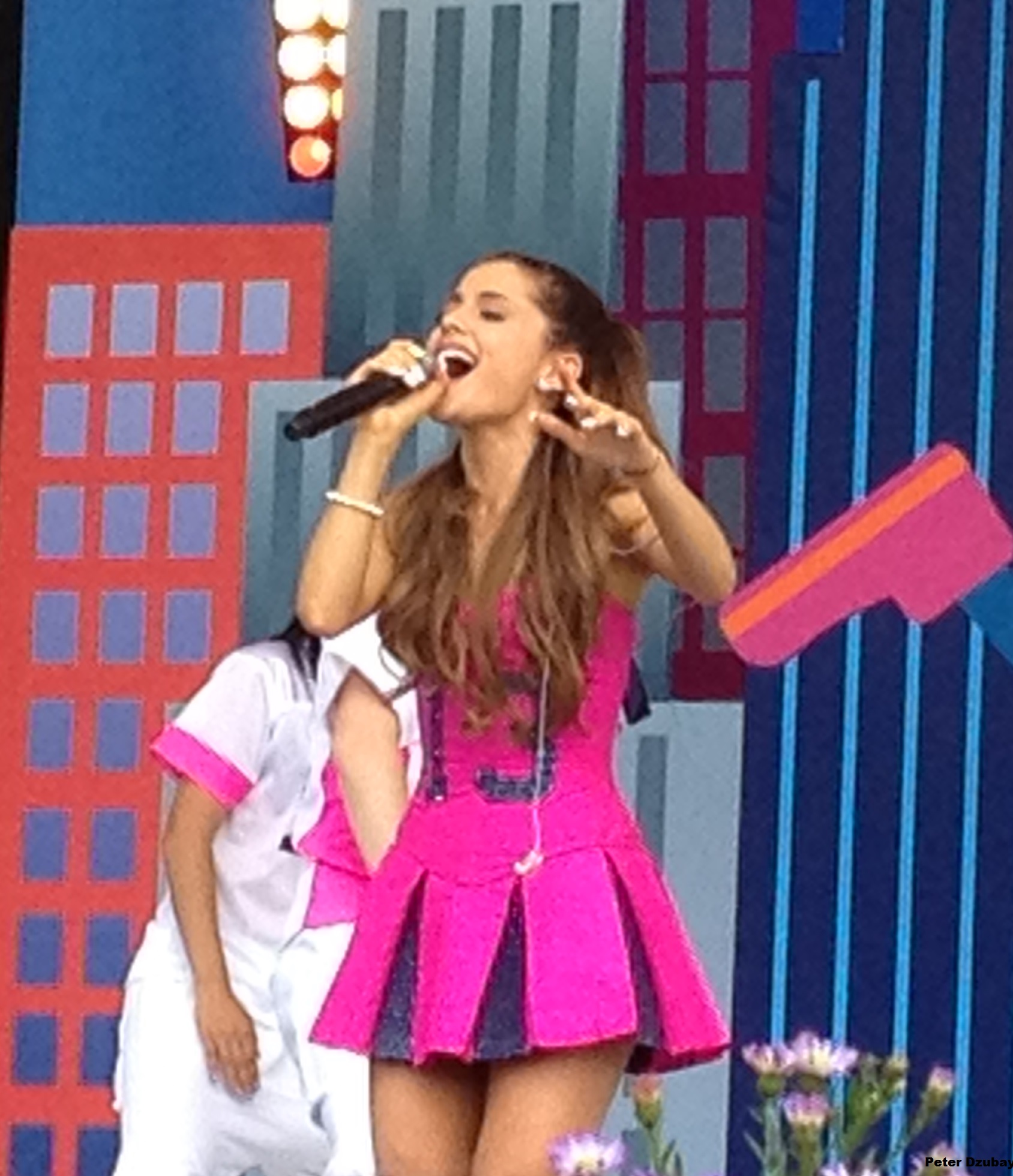
Grande performing the song during the event Worldwide Day Of Play in 2013

Ariana Grande performed the song at the 2013 MTV Video Music Awards pre-show in medley with "The Way". She sang only the first verse, chorus, and bridge before moving into "The Way". Caitlin White from MTV praised Grande's performance while commented that her "stunning, unstoppable belt proved she could handle the spotlight all on her own." Grande also performed "Baby I" at the 2013 Worldwide Day of Play. In a video published in her YouTube channel, the singer performed an acoustic version of the song accompanied by musician Dan Kanter. The song was also included as part of her headlining tour The Listening Sessions, and during her opening concerts for Justin Bieber's Believe Tour. it also appeared during some shows of her 2015 concert tour The Honeymoon Tour. The song was also included as part of Grande's set list on the Summer Sonic Festival in Chiba, Japan on August 16, 2015.

== Credits and personnel ==
Credits were adapted from Yours Truly's liner notes.

=== Recording and management ===
- Recorded at Brandon's Way Recording Studios (Los Angeles, California)
- Mixed at Larrabee Studios (Los Angeles, California)
- Mastered at Sterling Sound (New York City, New York)
- Published by Faze 2 Music — administered by Songs of Universal, Inc. — (BMI), Rafael's Son Music. (ASCAP), Christopher Matthew Music Publishing/BMG. (BMI)

=== Personnel ===
- Ariana Grande – lead vocals
- Kenneth "Babyface" Edmonds – songwriting, production
- Antonio Dixon – songwriting, horns arrangement
- Patrick "J. Que" Smith – songwriting
- Paul Boutin – recording
- Jaycen Joshua – mixing
- Kristopher Riddick-Tynes – recording, programming
- Peter Karlsson – vocal editing
- Sam Holland – engineering
- Ryan Kaul – mixing engineering
- Tom Coyne – mastering
- Aya Merrill – mastering
- Randy Ellis – tenor saxophone
- Andrew Carney – trumpet
- Fabio Spinella – trumpet
- Ben Devitt – trombone

== Charts ==
=== Weekly charts ===
Weekly chart performance for "Baby I"
Chart (2013–14)	Peak position
Australia (ARIA)	67
Canada Hot 100 (Billboard)	57
Japan Hot 100 (Billboard)	6
Netherlands (Dutch Tipparade)	39
UK Singles (OCC)	145
UK Hip Hop/R&B (Official Charts)	26
US Billboard Hot 100	21
US Dance Club Songs (Billboard)	18
US Rhythmic Airplay (Billboard)	28

=== Year-end charts ===
Year-end chart performance for "Baby I"
Chart (2014)	Position
Japan (Japan Hot 100)	38
Japan Adult Contemporary (Billboard)	18

== Certifications ==
Region	Certification	Certified units/sales
Australia (ARIA)	Gold	35,000^{‡}
Brazil (Pro-Música Brasil)	Gold	30,000^{‡}
Japan (RIAJ) Digital	Gold	100,000^{*}
New Zealand (RMNZ)	Gold	15,000^{‡}
United States (RIAA)	Platinum	1,000,000^{‡}
^{*} Sales figures based on certification alone.^{‡} Sales+streaming figures based on certification alone.

== Release history ==
"Baby I" release history
Region	Date	Format	Label	Ref.
United States	July 22, 2013	Digital download	Republic	
United States	August 5, 2013	Rhythmic contemporary radio	Republic	
United States	August 6, 2013	Contemporary hit radio	Republic	
