= Right There (Ariana Grande song) =

Single by Ariana Grande featuring Big Sean

from the album Yours Truly
- Released: August 6, 2013
- Recorded: 2013
- Studio: London Bridge's Studios (Los Angeles, CA); Studios de la Reine (Paris)
- Genre: R&B
- Length: 4:07
- Label: Republic
- Songwriters: Harmony Samuels; Helen "Carmen Reece" Culver; J. "Lonny" Bereal; James "J-Doe" Smith; Al Sherrod Lambert; Ariana Grande; Sean Anderson p/k/a Big Sean; Jeff Lorber
- Producer: Harmony

Ariana Grande singles chronology
"Baby I" (2013)	"Right There" (2013)	"Last Christmas" (2013)

Big Sean singles chronology
"Beware" (2013)	"Right There" (2013)	"Fire" (2013)

Music video
- "Right There" on YouTube

"Right There" is a song by American singer-songwriter Ariana Grande, featuring American rapper Big Sean. It was released on August 6, 2013, by Republic Records as the third and final single from Grande's debut studio album Yours Truly (2013), It was written by Harmony Samuels, Helen "Carmen Reece" Culver, J. "Lonny" Bereal, James "J-Doe" Smith, Al Sherrod Lambert, Grande, Sean, and Jeff Lorber. It features a prominent sample of the jazz instrumental song "Rain Dance" (1979) by The Jeff Lorber Fusion. The song is a throwback to R&B music of the 1990s, a sonority that predominates the production of Yours Truly and the first single "The Way", which Grande considered "Right There" as a sequel to, that uses heavy programmed snare drums, snaps and synthesizers as complement of its sound. In the lyrics, Grande expresses her passion to her love interest affirming that she will always be there for him, with Sean responding to her affirmation while using several double entendres in a more sexual perspective.

The song was praised by music critics who complimented its old-school production, which they felt recalled music released by Mariah Carey in the 1990s. In the United States, the song reached a peak of at number 84 on the Billboard Hot 100, while achieving top ten positions on the Dance Club Songs and Rhythmic charts. The single was later certified Platinum in the United States by the RIAA, for selling over 1,000,000 copies.

Its accompanying music video was released on October 30, 2013, directed by the Young Astronauts team who added a concept inspired by William Shakespeare's work Romeo and Juliet. The video takes place at a Victorian era costume party in a mansion. Grande appears dressed as Juliet, while Patrick Schwarzenegger makes a cameo as Romeo. The video received positive commentaries by some publications. To promote the song, Grande performed for some radio stations across the United States including Los Angeles Power 106 and Capital XTRA, she also promoted it on the televised show, Jimmy Kimmel Live!. The song was included as part of her set list for her first headlining tour called The Listening Sessions (2013), The Honeymoon Tour (2015) and the Sweetener World Tour (2019).

== Background and composition ==
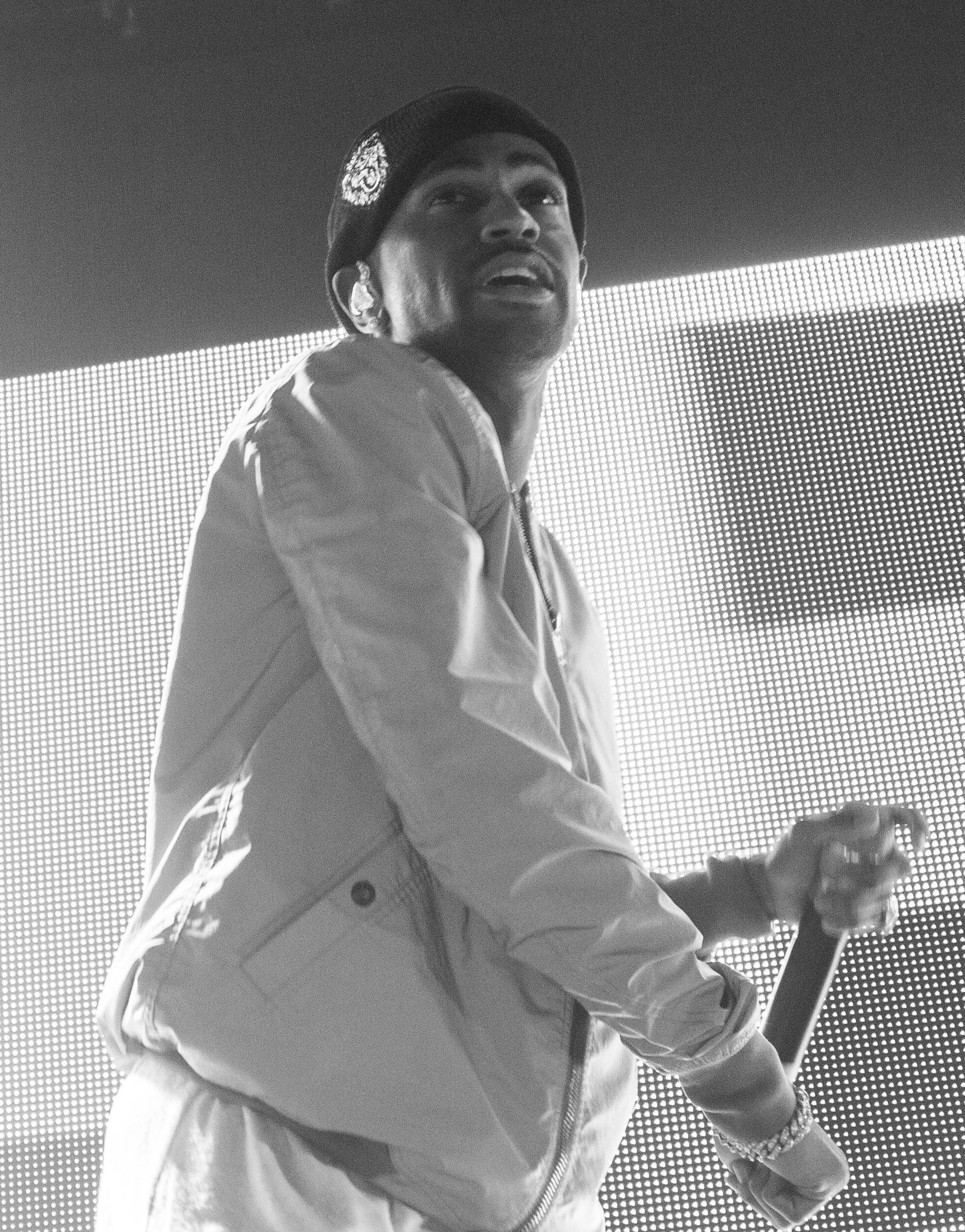
The rapper Big Sean (pictured) appears as featuring artist in "Right There." In his verses, Sean uses several double entendres about sexual attraction.

"Right There" was written by Ariana Grande, Harmony Samuels, H. "Carmen Reece" Culver, J. "Lonny" Bereal, James "J-Doe" Smith, Al Sherrod Lambert, Jeff Lorber and Big Sean. Grande recorded her lines at the London Bridge's Studios in Los Angeles, California, while Sean's verse was recorded at Studios de la Reine in Paris, France. "Right There" samples the 1979 jazz instrumental song "Rain Dance" by The Jeff Lorber Fusion; it is the same sample that was used for the 1997 Lil' Kim song "Crush on You". Grande has referred to "Right There" as "sort of a sequel" to her first top-ten single "The Way" due to the songs' similarities in melody and composition. The singer spoke of the mutual interest she and rapper Big Sean felt in wanting to collaborate but mentioned that it took some time for them to find the right song. She said, "We were talking about a few other songs together but it just never worked out and it never was the right moment and then finally 'Right There' came along. And we were like 'Oh this is it'."

In production terms, "Right There" has a 1990s R&B throwback style sound that is instrumentally supported by stabbing synths, trap-inflected programmed snare drums and a mid-tempo beat that runs through a groove. Grande introduces the song using her higher vocal register while a distorted bass voice appears singing the hook while Grande harmonizes around. Sean then half-rapped his verse, "OK, this, this, this for my number one girl who got the top spot title/ Spent a hour in the bathroom walked out looking like a model." Grande later appears singing her first verse: "Boy you make me feel lucky/ Finally the stars align/ Never has it been so easy, tell me you love/ And to give you this heart of mine."

Its lyrics find Grande affirming that she will always being there for her love interest. Sean agree, reaffirming that he will be there for her too as Lucas Villa from AXS perceived. However, some critics noted sexual suggestions in Sean's verses. Entertainment Weekly's Nick Catucci commented that the rapper "slyly acknowledges Grande's chaste image in the song, crediting the "missionary" position for his player status." Catucci noted Grande's innocence "isn't sacred, but the fact that she wears it as lightly as she does may be a small miracle." Jason Lipshutz from Billboard wrote that while Sean "boasts about his sexual prowess," Grande flaunts her typically "impressive melismas before ratcheting up the emotion for the finale."

== Release and reception ==
[Big Sean and I] were friends for a while. We always talked about making music together at some point and we were always looking for the right song but we couldn't really find it. Then "Right There" came along and I was like, "I found it", and he threw his voice on it and he killed it. It's amazing.

— Grande, in a Complex magazine interview

While the song was originally released as a promotional track available for immediate download with pre-orders of Yours Truly on iTunes, Grande stated in an interview that it evolved into a single on its own: "'Right There' is kind of about to be the next single. I think we're going to do a video for it soon. It's just because of what's naturally happened with 'Right There'. Radio's just sort of started picking it up and fans seem to really be responding to that one." Jenna Rubenstein of MTV praised Grande's performance in the song writing "her breezy vocals and twinkling melisma lay perfectly over the swirling track." Kevin Goddarg of the HotNewHipHop felt that "Right There" was a "fine addition to the growing" body of work that Grande had been developing since "stepping foot in the game."

Williot added that Grande shows off her range once again, all with some "Mariah Carey-inspired runs and vocal melodies coming from all angles." While Sean, channels Wiz Khalifa "for a chilled out flow on this one, which is his latest foray into the world of young pop stars." Ryan Reed from Rolling Stone also applauded Grande's performance comparing her vocals to that of Mariah Carey by stating that she sings "channeling the sweetness (and melodic content)" of Carey's 1995 song "Always Be My Baby" (from Carey's fifth studio album Daydream).

== Commercial performance ==
In the United States, "Right There" debuted at its peak position of number 84 on the Billboard Hot 100 chart issued for August 24, 2013, giving Grande her fifth entry on the chart and Sean his eleventh. It left the chart the following week and returned at number 100 with contributions from the music video, released on October 20, 2013. The song spent eight weeks on the Hot 100 and placed in the top ten on other Billboard component charts including the Dance Club Songs and Rhythmic charts, peaking at number eight in both. It was certified gold by the Recording Industry Association of America (RIAA) on July 30, 2014, for selling over 500,000 units in the United States. In the United Kingdom, although it failed to appear on the UK Singles Charts top 100 – it eventually reached number 112 – the song found success on the UK R&B Chart, where it reached number 15. For the week ending August 24, 2013, "Right There" debuted at number 100 on the South Korean International Singles Chart, becoming Grande's first entry on the chart.

== Music video ==
=== Background and concept ===
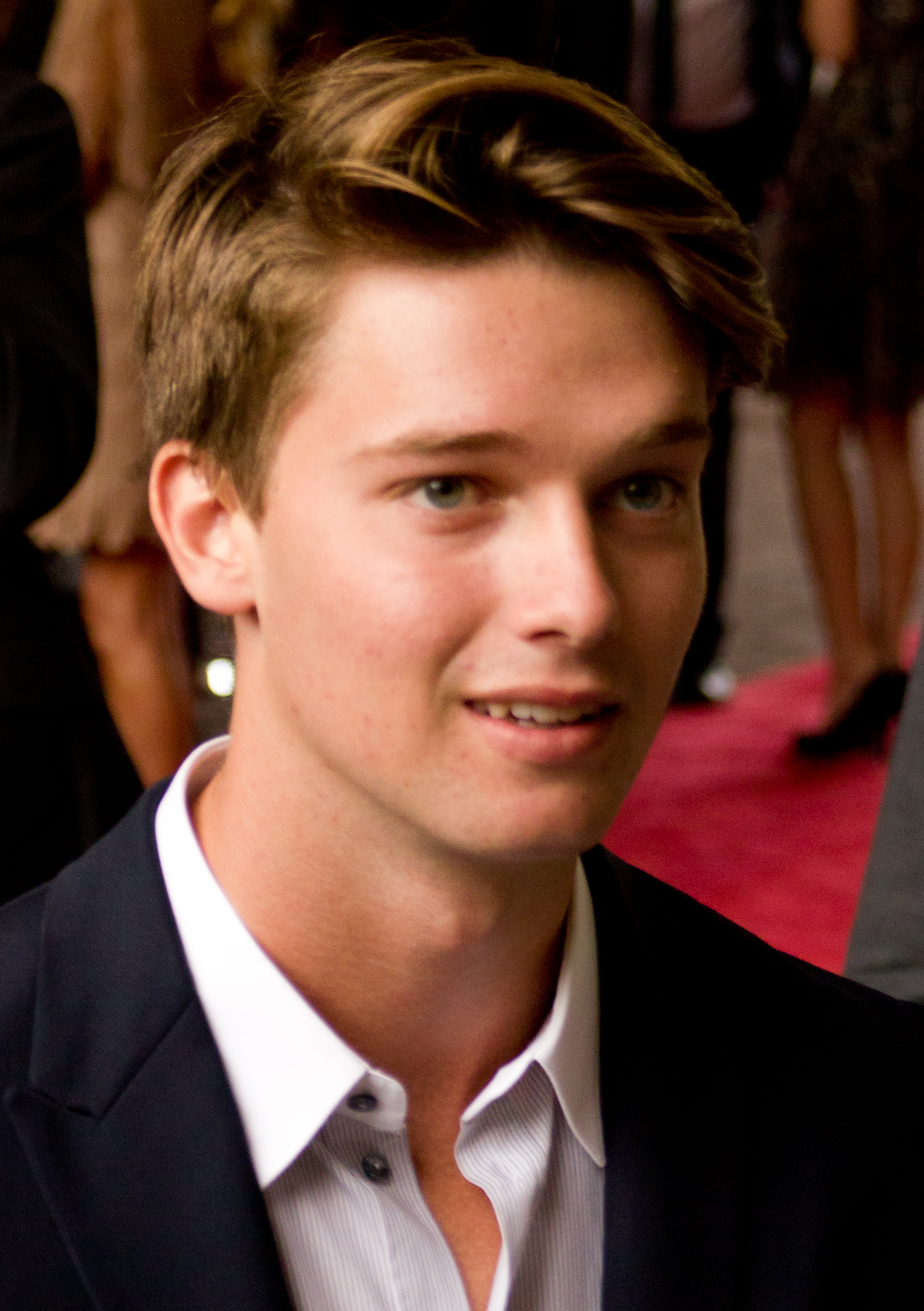
Patrick Schwarzenegger (pictured) served as a guest in the music video, playing Grande's love interest (Romeo).

The music video for the song was released on October 30, 2013. Two previews of the video were posted online on October 18, 2013. In the first preview, Grande wears a pink-colored dress, and appears in a Victorian-era inspired party. In the second preview, Grande published a photo showing Big Sean perched on an ornate chair. The concept of the video was inspired by William Shakespeare's Romeo and Juliet. It takes place at a costume party in a mansion. Grande, dressed as Juliet, attracts the attention of another party-goer dressed as Romeo. The two navigate the party trying to find each other and finally meet and get together at the end of the video. The role of Grande's love interest is played by Patrick Schwarzenegger, the son of action film actor Arnold Schwarzenegger.

Grande's friend, 13 and Victorious co-star Elizabeth Gillies is also featured in the video. The video was also inspired by Baz Luhrmann's film Romeo + Juliet. During an interview with MTV News, the music video's director Nev Todorovic and producer Ally Pankiw of the Young Astronauts opened up to about the video aesthetic. Todorovic said that the references to Luhrmann's 1996 re-telling of the play was something that they had not originally intended on:

"The religious symbolism and the costume party are all from the original Shakespearean play, but as we were planning the shoot, and especially on set, we started seeing more of those similarities emerge. Like if you notice, we had an Astronaut in the masquerade ball and everyone is comparing it to Paul Rudd's character, but really it was an homage to our team The Young Astronauts!"

According to Todorovic, it was fitting for Big Sean to play the role of the narrator of the story and the priest in the Romeo and Juliet tale, especially "because of the religious imagery in his lyrics". He also explained the decision to put Big Sean's apparition as a priest, by stating: "And the moment he got in that throne, I was like 'Yes! This is perfect.' He got so comfortable, kicked his leg up, and I was like 'Stay there, yes, let's roll. If Kanye West is Yeezus, then Big Sean sure as hell makes a great priest!"

=== Synopsis ===
Grande wearing a pink dress in a masqueraded, costume Victorian-era inspired party while surrounded by party guests during the music video (as illustrated above).

The video begins with a rapid introduction with various different scenes that are going to appear later in the music video. A red screen is shown as the rapper Big Sean opens his Bible. Grande is then seen on a frilly Victorian bed with a pink-colored dress and a hand fan while her character (Juliet) is introduced through subtitles in the left side of the video. Scenes of the masquerade party are rapidly shown, Schwarzenegger and Sean are also presented as their respective characters ("Romeo" and "the Priest"). Sean removes his vestment and starts singing his verse sitting in a throne while Grande is shown doing her make-up and fixing her hair in front of a mirror accompanied by two female friends. Schwarzenegger is shown cruising with his friends with whom he plays with by using plastic guns. As the song progresses, Grande walks down own the long stairs of the mansion to where the party is taking place. Once there, she appears performing a sultry choreography using her hand fan among with the guests of the glamorous event. They are all wearing elegant, gala costumes and mascaras.

Schwarzenegger arrives at the mansion with his friends. They jump over the gate as if it was closed and they appear to be late. He enters the masqueraded event and immediately finds Grande who admires him by smiling into his face. As she tries to approach him, some guests block her vision and when she looks again, he is no longer there. This is followed by a scene in which the couple meets again outside the noisy floor, Grande is now singing in a balcony while her partner is gently watching and smiling at her. Sean is shown again sitting in a throne performing his second verse, his part is intercepted with scenes of the people dancing in the party. As the last chorus is heard, the couple and all the guests from the party venture into a massive swimming pool for a late-night make-out session. Grande and her partner appeared kissing each other over while synchronized swimmers perform in the pool. The video ends with Sean closing the same bible that also introduced the video.

=== Critics reception ===
Jocelyn Vena of MTV News found an "old school" vibe similar to the song's sound and to that of Grande's previous released single "Baby I" which also draws from 1990s influences. Cena also claimed that the video for "Right There" does not stray too far from the events written by Shakespeare and this is the kind of "schmaltz that Luhrmann would appreciate." Jason Lipshutz from Billboard considered the video as an understated tribute to the annual holiday Halloween – which started on October 31, a day following the video's release – for its modern-day "masquerade ball, complete with flowing gowns, wacky masks and Shakespearean nods." The Los Angeles Times's Mikael Wood wrote that Grande puts her "well-established love of princess dresses to work" in the music video.

== Live performances ==
In 2013, Grande performed an acoustic version of "Right There" for some radio stations during interviews and events such as POWER 106, Capital XTRA, SBTV Music, and Amp Radio Sound Space. She performed the single version on Jimmy Kimmel Live!, the 94.9's WiLD Jam at The SAP Center in San Jose, California on December 15, 2013, and at the 2014 Dick Clark's New Years Rockin' Eve in New York City's Times Square. In 2014, Grande performed an acoustic version at MTV's 'Artist To Watch', where she was joined by Tori Kelly for the performance. The single version was performed at the 2014 Wango Tango, the White House Easter Egg Roll 2014 (which she performed with Big Sean), select showcases in Tokyo, Japan, to promote the release of her debut album Yours Truly in the country, as well as at the 2014 iHeartRadio Ultimate Pool Party.

Grande also performed the song as part of her headlining tour The Listening Sessions, during her opening concerts for Justin Bieber's Believe Tour, and the 2013 KIIS-FM Jingle Ball Tour. Grande performed the song in 2015 during The Honeymoon Tour as well. In 2018, Ariana performed an a cappella version of Right There during two of the shows on The Sweetener Sessions (which were the shows in Chicago and London). A shortened version of the song was performed during the Sweetener World Tour, in a medley with "You'll Never Know" and "Break Your Heart Right Back", on all dates from March 19, 2019, to October 16, 2019, before it got removed and replaced with a medley of songs from her 2015 EP, Christmas & Chill.

== Charts ==
Chart (2013–14)	Peak position
Australia (ARIA)	51
South Korea International Chart (Gaon)	100
UK Singles (OCC)	112
UK Hip Hop/R&B (Official Charts)	15
US Billboard Hot 100	84
US Dance Club Songs (Billboard)	8
US Mainstream Top 40 (Billboard)	37
US Rhythmic Airplay (Billboard)	8

== Certifications ==
Region	Certification	Certified units/sales
Australia (ARIA)	Gold	35,000^{‡}
Brazil (Pro-Música Brasil)	Platinum	60,000^{‡}
New Zealand (RMNZ)	Gold	15,000^{‡}
United States (RIAA)	Platinum	1,000,000^{‡}
^{‡} Sales+streaming figures based on certification alone.

== Release history ==
Release history
Region	Date	Format	Label	Ref.
Various	August 6, 2013	Digital download	Republic	
United States	September 9, 2013	Rhythmic contemporary radio	Republic	
United States	October 15, 2013	Contemporary hit radio	Republic	
Italy	October 18, 2013	Radio airplay	Universal	
