= Yours Truly (Ariana Grande album) =

2013 studio album by Ariana Grande

- Standard artwork (Note: On digital platforms and limited DTC physical editions)

Studio album by Ariana Grande
- Released: August 30, 2013
- Recorded: August 2011 – June 2013
- Studios: Rocket Carousel (Culver City, California); Brandon's Way; The Lair (Los Angeles, California); The Power House (Yonkers, New York); Sound Emporium (Nashville, Tennessee); London Bridge (Seattle, Washington); Armoury (Vancouver, British Columbia, Canada); Powerhouse (London, England); Studio de la Reine (Paris, France)
- Genres: Pop; R&B
- Length: 46:23
- Label: Republic
- Producers: Harmony Samuels; Kenneth "Babyface" Edmonds; Antonio Dixon; Leon Thomas III; Tommy Brown; Matt Squire; Rickey "SlikkMuzik" Offord; Mika; Greg Wells

Ariana Grande chronology
Yours Truly (2013)	Christmas Kisses (2013)

Alternative cover
- Tenth Anniversary edition artwork

Singles from Yours Truly
- 1. "The Way" Released: March 26, 2013; 2. "Baby I" Released: July 22, 2013; 3. "Right There" Released: August 6, 2013

Yours Truly is the debut studio album by American singer-songwriter Ariana Grande. It was released on August 30, 2013, by Republic Records. The album's songs were recorded over nearly a two-year period, with Harmony Samuels, Kenneth "Babyface" Edmonds, Patrick "J. Que" Smith and Grande's Victorious co-star Leon Thomas III, as well as others, handling the album's music production. Featured collaborators include Big Sean, Mika, Mac Miller, and The Wanted's Nathan Sykes.

Yours Truly draws stylistic influences off the music of Grande's artistic inspirations, including singers Mariah Carey, Whitney Houston, Amy Winehouse, and Christina Aguilera. Musically, the album is a pop and R&B record, while incorporating 1990s hip hop, 1950s piano pop, and doo-wop music within its production. It was acclaimed by critics upon release, with praise for Grande's vocals.

Yours Truly debuted atop the US Billboard 200 chart, with over 138,000 units sold in its first week. It made Grande the fifteenth female artist to ever debut at number-one in the United States with her debut album. The album was certified platinum by the Recording Industry Association of America (RIAA). It also garnered top ten peaks in Australia, Canada, Denmark, Ireland, Japan, the Netherlands and the United Kingdom. Yours Truly was featured in the Billboard 200 year-end charts of both 2013 and 2014.

The album was preceded by the release of the lead single, "The Way", on March 26, 2013. It became a top ten hit on the US Billboard Hot 100 chart, peaking at number nine. The second single, "Baby I", was released on July 22, 2013, and peaked at number 21 on the Hot 100. The third and final single, "Right There", was released on August 6, 2013, and reached number 84 in the US. Yours Truly was further promoted with live renditions of the album's songs during the Listening Sessions tour in 2013.

== Background and conception ==
They can expect a lot of honesty. It's like a direct... you know, it's like it used to be pages from my diary, instead of keeping a diary, I would write songs about what was happening in my life. So it's really personal. It's a Motown throwback and pop at the same time, so it's '50s and '60s inspiration mixed with today.

— Grande, on the album

Work on Yours Truly began in August 2010 while Grande was in the process of filming Victorious and formally began to work on it with a record label after she was signed to Republic Records on August 10, 2011. By September 10 of that year, Grande already had 20 songs prepared and was going through the process of narrowing it down to 13. On December 12, 2011, Grande released "Put Your Hearts Up" as the intended first single for the album. Upon release, the song had sold 120,000 download units.

In an interview in June 2012, Grande described everything on Yours Truly as being "[19]50s, [19]60s doo-wop-inspired", and revealed that two new singles were going to be released before the album—one of which was called "Do You Love Me?" featuring Sky Blu. One of the tracks, "You're My Only Shawty", did not make the final cut of the album and was eventually given to American singer Demi Lovato for her third studio album Unbroken, as "You're My Only Shorty". In 2013, Grande met up with her label and expressed dissatisfaction with the direction the album was taking. In several interviews during that year, she admitted to having completely disliked "Put Your Hearts Up", and not having an interest in pursuing music of that genre. She expressed a desire to make the type of music she grew up listening to, which was "urban pop, [19]90s music". Grande's team had asked rapper Iggy Azalea to work on a feature for the album, but Azalea turned it down. The two later collaborated on "Problem", which was featured on Grande's second album My Everything.

Yours Truly is inspired by a variety of different artists, ranging from Amy Winehouse and Christina Aguilera to Mariah Carey and Whitney Houston. Grande said the album's first half is a "throwback" to the R&B music of the 1990s, and the second half is "something that is very unique and very special that I've sort of written" which is completely original. In summation of the record, she stated: "So half of it is a throwback and like very familiar feeling, feel-good, and then half of it is something that I've created that's sort of special and unique and refreshing and wonderful and I love it".

== Composition ==
"Tattooed Heart"
A 19-second sample of "Tattooed Heart", a doo-wop song with finger snaps, piano, and strings in its instrumentation.

The musical style of Yours Truly explores a style of retro sound mixing 1990s pop and R&B, with certain songs incorporating influences from mid-1990s hip hop, 1950s piano pop, and doo-wop. Scott Interrante from PopMatters complimented the music presented in the album and noted that compositionally and production wise, "tropes of both styles are blended together effortlessly." As he perceived, "erratic programmed drums support the rich harmonies and piano chords of the more doo-wop songs and the R&B tracks are infused with a wide-eyed optimism more associated with the [19]60s pop style." Pitchfork's Andrew Ryce felt that Grande opted "for a 90s hip-hop soul vibe that awkwardly sits with the more doo-wop-indebted songwriting."

=== Songs ===
The album opens with an orchestral intro that introduces the first track "Honeymoon Avenue", a downtempo song composed in the key of F-sharp major and set in a 4/4 time signature at a moderate tempo of 63 beats per minute. The song explores the 1950s musical style mixing doo-wop with an urban-inspired sound. Lyrically, "Honeymoon Avenue" uses several metaphors to speak about someone in a car being driven by her (romantic) partner. The driver is stuck to the same old route and driving mode that may make them crash. In interview with MTV, Grande explained its lyrics saying that "Honeymoon Avenue" "is about knowing you are at the end of a relationship and wishing it could not be the end and go back to the beginning and start over." The second track "Baby I" is drenched in a "retro sound" from 1990s R&B and pop sonority. Lyrically, "Baby I" is a confession on Grande's behalf admitting a special love for someone and how she can't formulate her strong feelings into words. The elements of "Baby I" are further illustrated by its use of finger snaps, a syncopated beat, horns and drums.

The third track "Right There" features guest appearance by rapper Big Sean. Musically, "Right There" also incorporates the influences frein 1990s R&B and urban music, mixing "stabbing synths", trap-inflected beat and a hip hop groove. Reviewing the song, Jason Lipshutz from Billboard noted that "while Big Sean boasts about his sexual prowess, Grande flaunts her typically impressive melismas before ratcheting up the emotion for the finale." The fourth track "Tattooed Heart" is a doo-wop song written in the key of G major with a tempo of 72 beats per minute in compound quadruple (12/8) time while Grande's vocals spans from D_{4} to F_{5}. "Piano" is built on a hand-clapped rhythm, pulsating beats and a piano loop.

== Release and promotion ==
To promote her debut single "The Way", Grande visited various radio stations, including: Y-100 Miami, 93.3 FM, Z100, KIIS-FM, and 99–7 Now. Grande performed the song at several concerts produced for Top 40 radio stations, including KIIS-FM's Wango Tango concert on May 11, 2013, in Los Angeles, 101.3 KDWB's Star Party concert on May 17 in Minneapolis, Kiss 108's Kiss Concert 2013 event on May 18 in Boston, 103.3 AMP Radio's Birthday Bash concert on June 30 also in Boston, and Mix 93.3's Red White & Boom concert on July 5 in Kansas City. Her first televised performance of the song was aired on May 29, 2013, on The Ellen DeGeneres Show.

On August 1, 2013, Grande revealed the cover artwork for Yours Truly, which features her kneeling on a bed of roses in front of a pink background. Due to fan criticism, she quickly unveiled a new cover, which simply featured the singer standing beneath a spotlight in a black-and-white image. On August 7, Grande revealed the album's track listing via iTunes Store, and Republic Records made pre-orders for the album available. A music video for "Almost Is Never Enough"—a duet with The Wanted's Nathan Sykes—premiered online on Vevo on August 19 to promote the film The Mortal Instruments: City of Bones; the track is featured on the film's official soundtrack. It debuted on the Billboard Hot 100 at number 84. "Popular Song" featuring Grande was released on December 21, 2012, as a single from Mika's third studio album, The Origin of Love. The album version of the song features vocals from the original songwriter, Priscilla Renea, and contains expletives. However, the single version does not include Renea, replacing her with Grande, and removing the expletives.

Grande performed "The Way" and "Baby I" at the 2013 MTV Video Music Awards' Preshow on August 25, 2013. Five days later, Yours Truly was released in Great Britain, and on September 3 in the United States. Grande performed "The Way" with Mac Miller on the Today along with "Tattooed Heart" on the day of the album's US release; she also performed the latter at the 2013 Style Awards on September 4, 2013. Grande also made several other appearances throughout the week appearing on Live! with Kelly and Michael, Today and Late Night With Jimmy Fallon, where she performing an acoustic version of "The Way".

=== The Listening Sessions ===
Grande embarked on her first solo concert tour titled the Listening Sessions in support of Yours Truly. Pre-sale tickets went on sale on July 18, 2013, while regular tickets went on sale on July 19. Pre-sale tickets had to be taken down early, as they were selling at such a fast rate that the tour was almost sold before regular tickets were available. Grande also was the opening act for the last three US dates of Justin Bieber's Believe Tour, which took place in Jacksonville, Tampa, and Atlanta on August 7, August 8, and August 10, in support of the album.

=== Singles ===
"The Way" was released to digital retailers through Republic Records in the United States on March 26, 2013, as the album's lead single. It was written by the song's producer Harmony Samuels, alongside Amber Streeter, Al Sherrod Lambert, Jordin Sparks, Brenda Russell and Mac Miller, who is also featured in the song. The song debuted at number 10 on the US Billboard Hot 100, becoming Grande and Miller's first top-10 song on the chart; it made Grande the first top 10 arrival for a lead female artist, making her first Hot 100 appearance since Yael Naim, who launched with "New Soul" in 2008. The song peaked at number nine on the US Billboard Hot 100. Having sold over 219,000 units in its opening week, "The Way" holds the third best-selling first-week sales figure of 2013 behind Justin Timberlake's "Suit & Tie" and One Direction's "Best Song Ever". The song received a triple platinum certification by the Recording Industry Association of America (RIAA).

"Baby I" was released to digital retailers by Republic Records on July 22, as the second single from the album. It was written and produced by Kenneth "Babyface" Edmonds, Antonio Dixon and Patrick "J. Que" Smith. The song sold 141,000 copies in its first week and debuted at number 21 on the Billboard Hot 100 chart, becoming her second top forty hit. It also debuted at number six on the Hot Digital Songs chart, making Grande the only woman to debut two songs in the top-10 on the Hot Digital Songs chart during 2013. Filming for the song's music video took place July 28–29. Grande hinted that the video would "travel" back to the 1990s and that there would be "lots of color" and "lots of baggy clothes".

"Right There", featuring Big Sean, was released to digital retailers by Republic Records on August 6, as the third and final single. It was written by Grande, Carmen Reece, Lonny Bereal, James "J-Doe" Smith, Trey Starxx, Al Sherrod Lambert, Sean Anderson, Jeff Lorber, and Harmony Samuels, who also handled the song's production. "Right There" debuted on the US Billboard Hot 100 at number 84. It was then serviced to rhythmic contemporary radio on September 10.

=== Reissue ===
The anniversary edition of Yours Truly was released on August 25, 2023, as part of a week-long celebration marking the ten-year milestone of the original album's debut. The reissue was announced by Grande on August 19, through her Instagram account, where she shared details of the upcoming release and the celebratory events planned around it. It features live versions of several fan-favorite tracks from the original album, recorded to give a refreshed and intimate take on the songs that launched her music career. To promote the reissue, Grande released performance videos of the live tracks, held Q&A sessions to reflect on the album and her journey over the past decade, and introduced a limited-edition merchandise capsule inspired by the original era. A vinyl version of the reissue was also announced, made available for pre-order on August 30—the exact date of the original album's release ten years prior. The tenth anniversary edition serves as both a nostalgic tribute for longtime fans and a celebration of Ariana Grande's evolution as an artist since her debut. The reissue contains the original twelve tracks as well as the Spanglish version of "The Way" featuring Mac Miller, followed by the six newly recorded "live from London" performances.

== Critical reception ==
Professional ratings
Aggregate scores
Source	Rating
Metacritic	81/100
Review scores
Source	Rating
AbsolutePunk	70%
AllMusic	4/5 stars
Billboard	86/100
Digital Spy	4/5 stars
Entertainment Weekly	A−
Los Angeles Times	3/4 stars
The Michigan Daily	B
New York Daily News	3/5 stars
Pitchfork	6.5/10
PopMatters	8/10 discs

At Metacritic, which assigns a weighted average score out of 100 based on ratings and reviews from mainstream critics, the album received an average of 81, based on 9 reviews, indicating "universal acclaim". At AllMusic, Matt Collar rated the album four stars out of five, saying that Yours Truly was "surprisingly sophisticated and unique" which showcases Grande's soulful R&B vocals. He stated that the album often "brings to mind the intonations of Mariah Carey which are most likely intentional." Collar closed the statement saying that Yours Truly "makes the most of her talent." Nick Catucci of Entertainment Weekly graded the album an A−, calling the album "pure pop bliss" and "one of the most purely enjoyable albums of the year" that is powered by her "lithe, Broadway-honed voice".

At The New York Times, Jon Caramanica gave a positive review of the album, writing that television shows such as American Idol and Glee "have been responsible for an intense surge of interest in music on television, but they haven't left much of a mark on the shape of pop. That's because both shows are fundamentally conservative institutions, privileging the familiar and the unchallenging. They're about emulating, not innovating." Caramanica commended Grande for becoming the first "identifiable pop star" who takes the "rules of those enterprises, uses them as a foundation, and innovates atop them... She uses the "Glee"/"Idol" template as a jumping-off point to make modern pop-R&B with a sturdy vintage backbone."

Writing in his track-by-track review Jason Lipshutz from Billboard rated the album an eighty-six out of 100, saying that "Yours Truly carries the expectations of a young singer who has already proven herself on the pop charts, and even if the songs on her debut could not equal the quality of "The Way," Grande had the fan base and powerful pipes to survive a misfire." At PopMatters, Scott Interrante rated the album eight discs out of ten, writing that "Minor missteps aside, Yours Truly is ultimately an impressive debut for Grande." Ryan Dennehy of AbsolutePunk rated the album a 70-percent, stating that "Yours Truly is more tempered and less likely to put you in a beaming state of catatonia" that is "a missive containing some of her most personal thoughts and her oft-regrettable youthful impulses."

At Pitchfork, Andrew Ryce rated the album a 6.5 out of ten, calling it "a very safe record." Lewis Conner of Digital Spy rated the album four stars out of five, writing how "The production feels fresh, the lyrics are relatable and the melodies are as cool and sweet as a dollop of raspberry ripple", and where he also states that "The tone and pace of the album rarely changes, but the songs feel accomplished, polished and vibrant". Corner concluded by calling "Yours Truly" a "little less than a triumph." At The Michigan Daily, Gregory Hicks graded the album a B, saying "most tracks are of quality composition, lyrically and melodically, but beat usage becomes excessive at times." Jim Farber of The New York Daily News rated the album three stars out of five, stating that because the "armies of song doctors" that the release is "far more tuneful than Mariah's interchangeable hits."

== Commercial performance ==
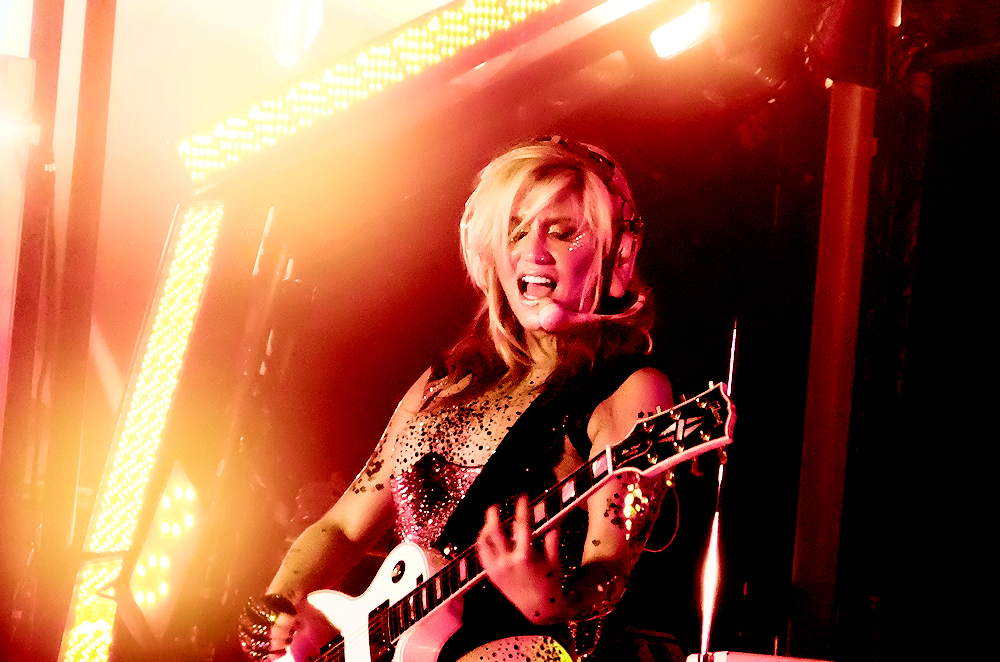
Grande became the fifteenth female artist overall to have her debut album top the US Billboard 200 albums chart and the first since Kesha's Animal in 2010.

On September 4, 2013, Billboard reported that Yours Truly would most likely sell between 110,000 and 120,000 copies in its first week in the United States by the end of September 11, 2013. Yours Truly officially debuted at the top of the US Billboard 200 chart, with 138,000 copies sold in its first week, becoming Grande's first number-one album as a solo artist. This made Grande the fifteenth female artist ever and the first female artist to have their first album debut atop of the charts since January 2010, when Kesha's Animal opened at number one. Grande's sales were especially strong digitally, as 108,000 of her first-week sales were from digital downloads, while the album sold 30,000 copies through physical sales. In its second week, the album dropped eight places to number nine selling 31,000 more copies, bringing its total sales in the United States to 169,000. As of June 2020, the album has sold 615,000 copies in the United States and was certified platinum by the Recording Industry Association of America (RIAA) on March 22, 2016, for shipments of one million copies. Yours Truly was ranked 106th on the Billboard 200 year-end chart. It then went on to become the 68th most popular album on that chart the following year.

Yours Truly also debuted in the top ten in several other countries, including Australia, where it debuted at number six; the United Kingdom, where it debuted at number seven; Ireland, where it debuted at number six; and the Netherlands, where it debuted at number five. It also debuted just outside the top ten on New Zealand's top forty chart at number eleven. As of May 2018, Yours Truly has sold more than 500,000 copies worldwide.

== Track listing ==
Yours Truly track listing
No.	Title	Writer(s)	Producer(s)	Length
1.	"Honeymoon Avenue"	Khristopher Riddick-Tynes; Leon Thomas III; Antonio Dixon; Kenneth "Babyface" Edmonds; Thomas Lee Brown; Travis Sayles; Victoria McCants; Roahn Hylton; Dennis "Aganee" Jenkins; Maurice Wade	Edmonds; Dixon; The Rascals; Brown^{[a]}; Matt Squire^{[a]}; Sayles^{[a]}	5:39
2.	"Baby I"	Edmonds; Dixon; Patrick "J.Que" Smith	Edmonds; Dixon	3:17
3.	"Right There" (featuring Big Sean)	Harmony Samuels; Helen "Carmen Reece" Culver; J. "Lonny" Bereal; James "J-Doe" Smith; Al Sherrod Lambert; Ariana Grande; Sean Anderson p/k/a Big Sean; Jeff Lorber	Harmony; Jo Blaq^{[b]}	4:07
4.	"Tattooed Heart"	Riddick-Tynes; Thomas; Dixon; Edmonds; Squire; Grande; Sean Foreman	Edmonds; Dixon; The Rascals; Squire^{[a]}; Nathaniel Motte^{[a]}	3:14
5.	"Lovin' It"	Riddick-Tynes; Thomas; Rickey Offord; Edmonds; Dixon; Mark Morales; Kirk S. Robinson; Nathaniel V Robinson; Mark Rooney	Edmonds; Dixon; The Rascals; Offord	3:00
6.	"Piano"	H. Samuels; Jahmaal Noel Fyffe; Parker Ighile; Anisa Moghaddam; Moses Ayo Samuels; Olaniyi Michael Akinkunmi; Grande	Harmony; Mo-Keyz^{[c]}; Mikey^{[c]}; Blaq^{[b]}	3:54
7.	"Daydreamin'"	Squire; Brown; McCants	Squire; Brown	3:31
8.	"The Way" (featuring Mac Miller)	H. Samuels; Amber Streeter; Lambert; Jordin Sparks; Malcolm McCormick; Brenda Russell	Harmony; Sauce^{[b]}; Grande^{[b]}	3:47
9.	"You'll Never Know"	Riddick-Tynes; Thomas; Edmonds; Dixon	Edmonds; Dixon; The Rascals	3:34
10.	"Almost Is Never Enough" (with Nathan Sykes)	H. Samuels; Culver; Lambert; M. Samuels; Akinkunmi; Grande	Harmony; Mo-Keyz^{[c]}; Mikey^{[c]}; Blaq^{[b]}; Carmen Reece^{[b]}; Talay Riley^{[b]}; Mark Asari^{[b]}	5:27
11.	"Popular Song" (Mika featuring Ariana Grande)	Mika; Priscilla Renea; Mathieu Jomphe; Stephen Schwartz	Greg Wells; Mika; Peter Stengaard^{[b]}; Nick Littlemore^{[c]}; Jason Nevins^{[c]}^{[d]}	3:20
12.	"Better Left Unsaid"	H. Samuels; Courtney Harrell; Lambert; M. Samuels; Akinkunmi; Grande	Harmony; Mo-Keyz^{[c]}; Mikey^{[c]}; Blaq^{[b]}; Sauce^{[b]}	3:32
Total length:				46:23

Tenth anniversary bonus tracks
No.	Title	Writer(s)	Length
13.	"The Way" (Spanglish version; featuring Mac Miller)	H. Samuels; Streeter; Lambert; Sparks; McCormick; Russell	3:47
14.	"Honeymoon Avenue" (live from London)	Khristopher Riddick-Tynes; Leon Thomas III; Antonio Dixon; Kenneth "Babyface" Edmonds; Thomas Lee Brown; Travis Sayles; Victoria McCants; Roahn Hylton; Dennis "Aganee" Jenkins; Maurice Wade	4:56
15.	"Daydreamin'" (live from London)	Matt Squire; Brown; McCants	3:30
16.	"Baby I" (live from London)	Edmonds; Dixon; Patrick "J.Que" Smith	3:17
17.	"Tattooed Heart" (live from London)	Riddick-Tynes; Thomas; Dixon; Edmonds; Squire; Ariana Grande; Sean Foreman	3:14
18.	"Right There" (live from London; featuring Big Sean)	Harmony Samuels; Helen "Carmen Reece" Culver; J. "Lonny" Bereal; James "J-Doe" Smith; Al Sherrod Lambert; Grande; Sean Anderson p/k/a Big Sean; Jeff Lorber	3:17
19.	"The Way" (live from London; featuring Mac Miller)	Samuels; Amber Streeter; Lambert; Jordin Sparks; Malcolm McCormick; Brenda Russell	3:34
Total length:			71:58

=== Notes ===
- ^{^[a]} signifies a co-producer.
- ^{^[b]} signifies a vocal producer.
- ^{^[c]} signifies an additional producer.
- ^{^[d]} signifies a remixer.
- Latin American edition includes the spanglish version of "The Way" featuring J Balvin as bonus track.
- Japanese edition includes the JdB radio edit of "The Way", Cosmic Dawn radio edit of "Baby I" and 7th Heaven radio edit of "Right There" as bonus tracks.
- Japanese deluxe edition includes a bonus DVD which features the music videos of "The Way", and "Baby I", and a Japan exclusive interview.

=== Sample credits ===
- "Right There" contains a sample of "Rain Dance", performed by The Jeff Lorber Fusion and written by Jeff Lorber.
- "Lovin' It" contains a sample of "Real Love", performed by Mary J. Blige and written by Mark Morales, Kirk S. Robinson, Nathaniel V Robinson, Mark Rooney and Roy Hammond.
- "The Way" contains a sample of "A Little Bit of Love", written and performed by Brenda Russell; and interpolates "Still Not a Player", performed by Big Pun, which also samples Russell's "A Little Bit of Love".
- "Popular Song" contains an interpolation of "Popular", from the musical Wicked, originally performed by Kristin Chenoweth and written by Stephen Schwartz.

== Personnel ==
Credits are adapted from the Yours Truly album liner notes.

=== Vocalists and musicians ===
- Ariana Grande – lead vocals, background vocals
- Big Sean – featured artist
- Mac Miller – featured artist
- Nathan Sykes – featured artist
- Mika – featured artist, vocals
- Leon Thomas III – background vocals
- Carmen Reece – background vocals
- Courtney Harrell – background vocals
- India Benét – background vocals
- Giovanna Clayton – cello
- Vanessa Freebairn-Smith – cello
- Paula Hochalter – cello
- John Catchings – cello
- Anthony LaMarchina – cello
- Pamela Sixfin – string contractor, violin
- Ben Devitt – trombone
- Andrew Carney – trumpet
- Fabio Spinella – trumpet
- Monisa Angell – viola
- Kristin Wilkinson – viola
- David Angell – violin
- David Davidson – violin
- Clayton Haslop – violin
- Sharon Jackson – violin
- Songa Lee – violin
- Mark Robertson – violin
- Julie Rogers – violin
- Mary Kathryn Van Osdale – violin
- Serg Dimitrijevic – guitar
- Joe Friedman – guitar
- Randy Ellis – horn arrangements, tenor saxophone
- Harmony Samuels – instrumentation
- Matt Squire – instrumentation
- Benjamin Levin – instrumentation
- Ryan Tedder – instrumentation
- Noel Zancanella – instrumentation
- Anton Zaslavski – instrumentation
- Magnus August Hoiberg – instrumentation
- Peder Losnegard – instrumentation
- Ali Payami – bass, drums, keyboard, percussion
- Niklas Ljungfelt – guitar
- Peter Zimney – saxophone
- Johan Carlsson – instrumentation
- Mattias Bylund – strings
- Rodney Jerkins – instrumentation
- Paul Dawson – instrumentation
- Jonas Thander – horns
- Travis Sayles – instrumentation
- Tommy Brown – instrumentation

=== Production ===
- Ariana Grande – executive producer, vocal producer
- Harmony Samuels – executive producer, producer
- Scott "Scooter" Braun – executive producer
- Jason Nevins – additional producer, drum programming, keyboard programming, mixing
- Nick Littlemore – additional production
- Mo-Keyz – additional production
- Justin Hergett – assistant engineer, mixing assistant
- James Krausse – assistant engineer, mixing assistant
- Maximilian Jaeger – assistant engineer
- Trehy Harris – assistant
- Ryan Kaul – assistant
- Khristopher Riddick-Tynes – producer, drum programming, engineer
- Mika – producer
- Antonio Dixon – horn arrangements, producer
- Matt Squire – producer
- Kenneth "Babyface" Edmonds – producer
- Rickey "Slikk" Offord – producer
- Travis Sayles – producer
- Phillip Lassiter – string arrangements
- Joel Mott – string arrangements
- James Waddell – string engineer
- Carmen Reece – vocal arrangement, vocal producer
- Rob Kinelski – vocal mixing
- Mark Asari – vocal producer
- Jo Blaq – vocal producer
- Talay Riley – vocal producer
- Peter Kent – concertmaster
- Bill Meyers – conductor, string arrangements
- Ivy Skoff – contractor
- Peter Stengaard – engineer, vocal producer
- Paul Boutin – engineer
- Jose Cardoza – engineer
- Larry Goetz – engineer
- Roy Hendrickson – engineer
- Carlos King – engineer
- Ian MacGregor – engineer
- Tommy Brown – producer
- Ced Solo – keyboard programming
- Tom Coyne – mastering
- Aya Merrill – mastering
- Jon Castelli – mixing engineer
- Jaycen Joshua – mixing
- Scribz Riley – vocal engineer
- Tony Maserati – mixing
- Greg Wells – producer, programming
- Nathaniel Motte – producer
- The Rascals – producer
- Henry Hey – programming
- Kristin Hodge – album design
- Jones Crow – photographer

== Charts ==
=== Weekly charts ===
2013–2014 weekly chart performance
Chart (2013–2014)	Peak position
Australian Albums (ARIA)	6
Austrian Albums (Ö3 Austria)	53
Belgian Albums (Ultratop Flanders)	62
Belgian Albums (Ultratop Wallonia)	82
Canadian Albums (Billboard)	2
Chinese Albums (Sino)	27
Danish Albums (Hitlisten)	10
Dutch Albums (Album Top 100)	5
French Albums (SNEP)	183
Greek Albums (IFPI)	31
Irish Albums (IRMA)	6
Japanese Albums (Oricon)	2
Mexican Albums (AMPROFON)	39
New Zealand Albums (RMNZ)	11
Norwegian Albums (VG-lista)	33
Scottish Albums (Official Charts)	18
South Korea International Albums (Gaon)	27
Spanish Albums (Promusicae)	45
Swiss Albums (Schweizer Hitparade)	57
UK Albums (Official Charts)	7
US Billboard 200	1

2021 weekly chart performance
Chart (2021)	Peak position
Polish Albums (ZPAV)	29

2023 weekly chart performance
Chart (2023)	Peak position
UK R&B Albums (OCC)	1

2024 weekly chart performance
Chart (2024)	Peak position
Argentine Albums (CAPIF)	10
Greek Albums (IFPI)	14

Weekly chart performance for tenth anniversary edition
Chart (2023)	Peak position
New Zealand Albums (RMNZ)	24

=== Year-end charts ===
2013 year-end chart performance
Chart (2013)	Position
US Billboard 200	106

2014 year-end chart performance
Chart (2014)	Position
Japanese Albums (Oricon)	42
US Billboard 200	68

2021 year-end chart performance
Chart (2021)	Position
Polish Albums (ZPAV)	89

== Certifications ==
Certifications and sales
Region	Certification	Certified units/sales
Australia (ARIA)	Gold	35,000^{‡}
Canada (Music Canada)	Platinum	80,000^{‡}
Finland (Musiikkituottajat)	Platinum	20,000
Japan (RIAJ)	Gold	125,000
New Zealand (RMNZ) Tenth Anniversary Edition	Platinum	15,000^{‡}
Norway (IFPI Norway)	Gold	10,000^{‡}
Poland (ZPAV)	Gold	10,000^{‡}
Singapore (RIAS)	Gold	5,000^{*}
Switzerland (IFPI Switzerland)	Gold	10,000^{‡}
United Kingdom (BPI)	Gold	100,000^{‡}
United States (RIAA)	Platinum	1,000,000^{‡}
^{*} Sales figures based on certification alone.^{‡} Sales+streaming figures based on certification alone.

== See also ==
- List of number-one albums of 2013 (U.S.)
