= Almost Is Never Enough =

Promotional single by Ariana Grande and Nathan Sykes

from the album The Mortal Instruments: City of Bones and Yours Truly
- Released: August 19, 2013
- Recorded: 2011
- Studio: Powerhouse Studios (London, England); London Bridge Studios (Los Angeles, CA)
- Genre: Pop; soul
- Length: 3:30 (soundtrack version); 5:28 (album version)
- Label: Republic; Island
- Songwriters: Harmony Samuels; Helen "Carmen Reece" Culver; Al Sherrod Lambert; Moses Ayo Samuels; Olaniyi Michael Akinkunmi; Ariana Grande
- Producer: Harmony

Ariana Grande promotional singles chronology
"L.A. Boyz" (2012)	"Almost Is Never Enough" (2013)	"Best Mistake" (2014)

Music video
- "Almost Is Never Enough" on YouTube

"Almost Is Never Enough" is a song recorded by American singer Ariana Grande and English singer Nathan Sykes. The pop and soul-influenced track was written by Carmen Reece, Al Sherrod Lambert, Moses Ayo Samuels, Olaniyi Michael Akinkunmi, Grande, and its producer, Harmony Samuels. Two official versions of the song exist. A shortened version is included on the official soundtrack for the 2013 fantasy film The Mortal Instruments: City of Bones and was released August 19, 2013, via Republic Records as a second promotional single from the same, following Colbie Caillat's "When the Darkness Comes" on July 10, and a longer version was remastered for inclusion on Grande's debut studio album, Yours Truly (2013).

== Composition ==
The song is composed using the key of D Major. The duo's vocal range spans 2 octaves and 2 notes, from F#3 to D6.

== Critical reception ==
"Almost Is Never Enough" (2013)
A 29-second sample of "Almost Is Never Enough", a pop and soul song.

The duet received primarily positive reception. Idolator editor Mike Wass called "Almost Is Never Enough" a "glorious" and "soulful" anthem and praised the collaboration between the two artists; "The simple production is timeless and showcases Ariana’s powerful pipes superbly. And who knew Nathan could sing like that? 'Almost Is Never Enough' is a revelation all around and promises very good things for Grande's debut album." Brent Faulkner of Star Pulse found the duet to be a pleasantly surprising blend of modern and classical elements and noted that the song "should be sappy but isn't". This sentiment was mirrored by Popdust's Andrew Unterberger, who observed that the song "manages to mostly stay out of the way of its two talented young vocalists... and lets them carry it with the strength of their voices, and of the song itself. The result is a ballad that’s surprisingly mature and classic sounding." Unterberger also drew comparisons to Mariah Carey, and her Boyz II Men duet "One Sweet Day" also Brandy and Wanya Morris's "Brokenhearted" in particular.

== Charts ==
=== Weekly charts ===
Chart (2013–2016)	Peak position
Ireland (IRMA)	56
Scotland Singles (OCC)	60
South Korea International Chart (Gaon)	4
UK Singles (OCC)	49
US Billboard Hot 100	82

=== Year-end charts ===
Chart (2015)	Position
South Korea International Chart (GAON)	113

Chart (2016)	Position
South Korea International Chart (GAON)	52

== Certifications ==
Region	Certification	Certified units/sales
Australia (ARIA)	Platinum	70,000^{‡}
Brazil (Pro-Música Brasil)	Gold	30,000^{‡}
New Zealand (RMNZ)	Platinum	30,000^{‡}
United Kingdom (BPI)	Silver	200,000^{‡}
United States (RIAA)	Platinum	1,000,000^{‡}
^{‡} Sales+streaming figures based on certification alone.
