= Al Sherrod Lambert =

American singer-songwriter

- Also known as: A-Rod
- Born: Newark, New Jersey, U.S.
- Genres: Hip hop; R&B; folk; pop
- Occupations: Singer; songwriter; record producer
- Instruments: Vocals; guitar
- Years active: 2010–present
- Label: Kobalt Music Group
- Website: instagram.com/igetpoints

Al Sherrod Lambert (/ˈʃɛrəd/ SHERR-əd; born June 29, 1985), sometimes known as simply A-Rod, is a Grammy Award winning American producer, singer, songwriter, and musician. He has won recognition as a gospel, pop, hip hop and R&B producer. He is signed to Kobalt Music Group and is a registered BMI songwriter.

== Personal life ==
Lambert was born in Newark, New Jersey. He moved to nearby Irvington as a teen and attended Irvington High School and Bloomfield College where he graduated in 2008. In 2010 Lambert moved to Los Angeles where he maintains residency with his wife and children.

== Career ==
=== Producing and songwriting ===
Lambert started his music career in 2010 when he worked on the songs "Sleeping Pills" and "All Said and Done" on the Jamie Foxx album Best Night of My Life with fellow New Jersey producer and songwriter Eric Hudson. The Following year he co-wrote "25/8" for Mary J Blige as well as the title track for the film Think Like a Man. The song was co written by Harmony Samuels, Eric Bellinger and Courtney Harrell and features the vocals of Jennifer Hudson, Ne Yo, and Rick Ross.

In 2013, Lambert wrote several songs for the Fantasia Barrino album Side Effects of You. The album was nominated for a Grammy Award for Best Urban Contemporary Album at the 52nd Annual Grammy Awards, as well as a nomination for Best Traditional R&B Performance for the single "Get it Right" and a nomination for Best R&B Song for "Without Me". That same year he received two Billboard Pop Awards at the BMI Awards for his work on the Ariana Grande singles "The Way" and "Right There". "The Way" peaked at #9 on the Billboard hot 100 and spent 28 weeks on the charts. The song is RIAA certified 6x platinum. "Right There" peaked at #84 on the Billboard Hot 100 and spent 8 weeks on the charts. The single is RIAA certified gold.

In 2014 Lamber co-wrote the Michelle Williams song "Say Yes". The song features vocals by former Destiny's Child members Kelly Rowland and Beyonce Knowles. The song peaked at #1, staying on the Billboard Hot 100 chart for 38 weeks. It was nominated for a Soul Train Award for best Gospel/Inspirational Song, and received four nominations at the 2015 Stellar Awards including a win for Music Video of the Year.

In 2017 Lambert was a songwriter on the Lalah Hathaway album Lalah Hathaway Live which received a Grammy Award for R&B Album of the Year. The album peaked at #2 on the Billboard Hot 100 and stayed on the charts for 12 weeks. He also wrote the single "Sexy Body" by Pitbull, and the singles "What is Love" and "Good Woman" on the La'Porsha Renae album Already All Ready. Later Lambert would keep his hit songwriting and producitin career moving full steam ahead by co-producing “March 14”’on Drakes Scorpion album, co writing “Made for Now” for the legendary Janet Jackson and co—writing “Borderline” for r and b superstar Brandy in 2020. In 2021 Lambert would become a main writer for the legendary Ronald Isley and The Isley Brothers penning three songs for the Rock & Roll hall of famers. He now is releasing his on music under his artist name POINTS for his record label Points On The Board.

== Discography ==
=== Songwriting and production credits ===
- No Chaser- Coco Jones (2022)
- Great Escape- The Isley Brothers Featuring Trey Songz (2022)
- Love Song - The Isley Brothers (2022)
- If I Should Die Tonight- Swizz Beatz & Ronald Isley (2021) SINGLE
- Borderline- Brandy Norwood (2020) SINGLE
- Misery - Good Girl (2019) SINGLE
- Love Riddim - Rotimi (2019) SINGLE
- March 14 - Drake (2019)
- Confidence - Colby O'donis (2019) SINGLE
- Keep Me Waiting - The Bonfyre (2018)
- Made For Now - Janet Jackson Feat. Daddy Yankee (2018) SINGLE
- Sexy Body - Pitbull Feat. Jennifer Lopez (2017)
- What Is Love - La'Porsha Renae (2017)
- Good Woman - La'Porsha Renae (2017) SINGLE
- Burn Me Down - Nathan Sykes (2016)
- Lovin' You - Trey Songz Ft. Ty Dolla Sign (2015)
- In The Air - Victon (2017)
- Let Me Know Tamar Braxton Feat Future (2015) SINGLE
- Apology - Austin Mahone (2015)
- Save Me Now - Dorinda Clarke Cole (2015)
- Believe in Me - Michelle Williams (2015)
- That's Me Right There - Jasmine V feat. Kendrick Lamar (single) (2014) SINGLE
- Supernatural Love Fantasia Barrino featuring Big K.R.I.T. (2014)
- Boss - Omarion Feat. Rick Ross (single) (2014) SINGLE
- Say Yes Michelle Williams Feat Beyonce and Kelly Rowland (2014) SINGLE
- Too Close - Ariana Grande (2014)
- You Don't Know Me - Ariana Grande (2014)
- Fall - Michelle Williams feat. Lecrae and Tye Tribbett (2014)
- Free - Michelle Williams(2014)
- Everything - Michelle Williams (2014)
- Say Yes - B5 (single) (2013)
- House Party - Mindless Behavior (2013)
- Almost is Never Enough Ariana Grande (2013) SINGLE
- The Way Ariana Grande Feat Mac Miller (2013) SINGLE
- Right There Ariana Grande Feat Big Sean (2013) SINGLE
- My Everything Ariana Grande (2013)
- Better Left Unsaid Ariana Grande (2013)
- Haunted Fantasia Barrino Feat Tank, King Los, Al Sherrod Lambert and Jamia (2013)
- Without Me Fantasia Barrino Feat Kelly Rowland and Missy Elliott (2013) SINGLE
- Ain’t All Bad Fantasia Barrino (2013)
- Get It Right Fantasia Barrino (2013)
- End of Me Fantasia Barrino (2013)
- Yes - Michelle Williams
- If We Had Your Eyes Michelle Williams Feat. Fantasia Barrino (2013) SINGLE
- Three Words Marcus Canty (2013) SINGLE
- Think Like A Man Jennifer Hudson Ne-Yo Rick Ross (2012) SINGLE
- From Above - Not The Same Girl (2011) SINGLE
- 25/8 Mary J Blige (2011) SINGLE
- Sleeping Pill - Jamie Foxx (2010)
- All Said and Done - Jamie Foxx (2010)

=== As a featured artist ===
- Haunted Fantasia Barrino Feat Tank, King Los, Al Sherrod Lambert and Jamia

=== For film ===
- Think Like A Man For The Movie Think Like A Man Jennifer Hudson Feat Ne-Yo and Rick Ross (2012)
- Say Yes Michelle Williams Feat Beyonce and Kelly Rowland (Video short) (2014)
- The Way Ariana Grande Feat. Mac Miller (Video short) (2013)

== Awards ==
- Grammy Awards
  - 2014 – Best R&B Song Fantasia Barrino "Without Me" - Nominated
  - 2014 – Best Traditional R&B Performance Fantasia Barrino "Get it Right" - Nominated
  - 2014 - Best Urban Contemporary Album Fantasia Barrino - "Side Effects of You" - Nominated
  - 2017 - Best R&B Album Lalah Hathaway "Lalah Hathaway Live" - Won
- BMI Awards
  - 2014 - Billboard Pop Award Ariana Grande The Way - Won
  - 2015 - Billboard Pop Award Ariana Grande Feat. Big Sean Right There - Won
- Soul Train Music Awards
  - 2016 - Gospel Song of the Year Michelle Williams Say Yes - Nominated
- Stellar Awards
  - 2015 - Song of the Year Michelle Williams Say Yes - Nominated
  - 2015 - Urban/Inspirational/Instrumental Single/Performance of the Year Michelle Williams Say Yes - Nominated
  - 2015 - Music Video of the Year Michelle Williams Say Yes - Won

=== Awards ===
Year	Award	Artist	Category	Result
2017	56th Annual Grammy Awards	Lalah Hathaway Lalah Hathaway Live	Best R&B Album	Won
2015	Stellar Awards	Michelle Williams Say Yes	Song of the Year	Nominated
2015	Stellar Awards	Michelle Williams Say Yes	Music Video of the Year	Won
2015	Stellar Awards	Michelle Williams Say Yes	Urban/Inspirational/Instrumental Single/Performance of the Year	Nominated
2015	BMI Awards	Ariana Grande Right There Feat Big Sean	Billboard Pop Award	Won
2014	BMI Awards	Ariana Grande The Way Feat Mac Miller	Billboard Pop Award	Won
2014	52nd Annual Grammy Awards	Fantasia Barrino Without Me	Best R&B Song	Nominated
2014	52nd Annual Grammy Awards	Fantasia Barrino Get it Right	Best Traditional R&B Performance	Nominated
2014	52nd Annual Grammy Awards	Fantasia Barrino Side Effects of You	Best Contemporary R&B Album	Nominated
