= The Best (Ariana Grande album) =

Greatest hits album by Ariana Grande
- Released: September 27, 2017
- Recorded: 2013–2017
- Length: 64:18
- Label: Universal Music Japan

Ariana Grande chronology
Dangerous Woman (2016)	The Best (2017)	Sweetener (2018)

The Best is the first greatest hits album by American singer Ariana Grande, released exclusively in Japan. It features songs from her first three studio albums: Yours Truly (2013), My Everything (2014) and Dangerous Woman (2016), as well as her duet with John Legend, "Beauty and the Beast" for the Beauty and the Beast: Original Motion Picture Soundtrack (2017) and "Faith" with Stevie Wonder for the Sing: Original Motion Picture Soundtrack (2016). It was released, digitally and physically, only in Japan on September 27, 2017, by Universal Music Japan.

In Japan, the album sold 24,764 copies in its opening week, where it peaked at number two on the Oricon Albums Chart. It ranked at numbers 68 and 73 on the Oricon year-end listings for 2017 and 2018, respectively.

== Release and artwork ==
The Best was released on September 27, 2017, by Universal Music Japan, in four different formats. The standard edition (which was also released digitally) features eighteen tracks. The deluxe edition features the eighteen tracks CD and a bonus DVD including four music videos while the Blu-ray version of the album contains ten music videos.

== Commercial performance ==
Commercially, The Best charted strongly upon release in Japan. The album opened with 24,764 copies sold in its first week, allowing it to peak at number two the Oricon Albums Chart, while debuting at number one on the Japanese Hot Albums (Billboard Japan)

The Best charted at numbers 68 and 73 on the Oricon Albums Chart Year-End listings for 2017 and 2018, respectively.

== Track listing ==
The Best – Standard edition
No.	Title	Writer(s)	Original album	Length
1.	"Break Free" (featuring Zedd)	Anton Zaslavski; Max Martin; Savan Kotecha	My Everything, 2014	3:35
2.	"Problem" (featuring Iggy Azalea)	Ilya; Martin; Kotecha; Iggy Azalea; Ariana Grande	My Everything	3:13
3.	"Baby I"	Kenneth "Babyface" Edmonds; Antonio Dixon; Patrick "J.Que" Smith	Yours Truly, 2013	3:17
4.	"Into You"	Kotecha; Grande; Alexander Kronlund; Ilya; Martin	Dangerous Woman, 2016	4:04
5.	"Bang Bang" (with Jessie J and Nicki Minaj)	Martin; Kotecha; Rickard Göransson; Onika Maraj	My Everything	3:18
6.	"Side to Side" (featuring Nicki Minaj)	Martin; Maraj; Kotecha; Grande; Kronlund; Ilya	Dangerous Woman	3:46
7.	"One Last Time"	David Guetta; Kotecha; Giorgio Tuinfort; Rami Yacoub; Carl Falk	My Everything	3:17
8.	"The Way" (featuring Mac Miller)	Harmony Samuels; Amber Streeter; Al Sherrod Lambert; Jordin Sparks; Brenda Russell; Malcolm McCormick	Yours Truly	3:47
9.	"Be Alright"	Thomas Brown; Victoria McCants; Khaled Rohaim; Nicholas Audino; Lewis Hughes; Willie Tafa; Grande; Neo Joshua; Alexander Crossan	Dangerous Woman	2:59
10.	"Love Me Harder" (with the Weeknd)	Martin; Kotecha; Peter Svensson; Ali Payami; Abel Tesfaye; Ahmad Balshe	My Everything	3:56
11.	"Everyday" (featuring Future)	Kotecha; Nayvadius Wilburn; Ilya; Grande	Dangerous Woman	3:14
12.	"Right There" (featuring Big Sean)	H. Samuels; Helen "Carmen Reece" Culver; J. "Lonny" Bereal; James J-Doe Smith; Lambert; Grande; Sean Anderson p/k/a Big Sean; Jeff Lorber	Yours Truly	4:07
13.	"Greedy"	Martin; Kotecha; Kronlund; Ilya	Dangerous Woman	3:34
14.	"Piano"	H. Samuels; Jahmaal Noel Fyffe; Parker Ighile; Anisa Moghaddam; Moses Ayo Samuels; Olaniyi Michael Akinkunmi; Grande	Yours Truly	3:54
15.	"Dangerous Woman"	Ross Golan; Johan Jens Erik Carlsson; Martin	Dangerous Woman	3:55
16.	"Best Mistake" (featuring Big Sean)	Anderson; Dwane Weir II; Grande; Denisia Andrews p/k/a Blu June	My Everything	3:53
17.	"Faith" (Stevie Wonder featuring Ariana Grande)	Ryan Tedder; Stevie Wonder; Benny Blanco; Brent Kutzle; Francis Starlite	Sing, 2016	2:42
18.	"Beauty and the Beast" (with John Legend)	Alan Menken; Howard Ashman	Beauty and the Beast, 2017	3:47
Total length:				64:18

Deluxe Edition – DVD
No.	Title	Director	Length
1.	"Baby I" (music video)	Ryan Pallotta	3:24
2.	"Break Free" (music video)	Chris Marrs Piliero	4:08
3.	"Into You" (music video)	Hannah Lux Davis	4:18
4.	"Side to Side" (music video)	Davis	3:59
Total length:			15:49

Limited Release – Blu-ray
No.	Title	Director	Length
1.	"Baby I" (music video)	Pallotta	3:24
2.	"The Way" (music video)	Jones Crow	3:52
3.	"Right There" (music video)	Nev Todorovic	4:19
4.	"Break Free" (music video)	Piliero	4:08
5.	"Bang Bang" (music video)	Davis	4:23
6.	"Love Me Harder" (music video)	Davis	4:11
7.	"One Last Time" (music video)	Max Landis	4:10
8.	"Dangerous Woman" (music video)	The Young Astronauts	3:56
9.	"Into You" (music video)	Davis	4:18
10.	"Everyday" (music video)	Piliero	3:18
Total length:			39:59

== Personnel ==
=== Vocals ===
- Ariana Grande – vocals (all tracks)
- Iggy Azalea – vocals (2)
- Jessie J – vocals (5)
- Nicki Minaj – vocals (5, 6)
- Mac Miller – vocals (8)
- The Weeknd – vocals (10)
- Future – vocals (11)
- Big Sean – vocals (12, 16)
- Stevie Wonder – vocals (17)
- John Legend – vocals (18)

=== Production ===
- Max Martin – production (1, 2, 4–6, 13, 15), vocal production (11, 15)
- Zedd – production (1)
- Ilya – production (2, 4–6, 11, 13), vocal production (7, 11), co-production (7)
- Peter Carlsson – vocal production (2, 10)
- Shellback – production (2)
- Antonio Dixon – production (3)
- Kenneth "Babyface" Edmonds – production (3)
- Kuk Harrell – vocal production (5)
- Rickard Göransson – production (5)
- Carl Falk – production (7)
- Giorgio Tuinfort – co-production (7)
- Rami – production (7)
- Savan Kotecha – vocal production (7)
- Ariana Grande – vocal production (8)
- Harmony – production (8, 12, 14)
- Sauce – vocal production (8, 16)
- Tommy Brown – production (9)
- Twice as Nice – production (9)
- Ali Payami – production (10)
- Peter Svensson – production (10)
- Jo Blaq – vocal production (12, 14)
- Mikey – additional production (12)
- Mo-Keyz – additional production (12)
- Johan Carlsson – production (15, vocal production (15)
- Key Wane – production (16)
- Benny Blanco – production (17)
- Harvey Mason Jr. – vocal production (17)
- Ryan Tedder – production (17)
- Ron Fair – production (18)

== Charts ==
=== Weekly charts ===
Chart (2017–2019)	Peak position
Japan Hot Albums (Billboard)	1
Japanese Albums (Oricon)	2

=== Year-end charts ===
Chart (2017)	Position
Japanese Albums (Oricon)	68

Chart (2018)	Position
Japan Hot Albums (Billboard Japan)	73

== Release history ==
Region	Date	Format	Label	Ref.
Japan	September 27, 2017	Blu-ray; CD; CD and DVD; digital download	Republic	
