= Dangerous Woman Tour =

2017 concert tour by Ariana Grande

- Tour by Ariana Grande
- Promotional poster
- Location: Asia; Europe; North America; Oceania; South America
- Associated album: Dangerous Woman
- Start date: February 3, 2017
- End date: September 21, 2017
- Legs: 6
- No. of shows: 77
- Supporting acts: Victoria Monét; Little Mix; Bia; Sabrina Carpenter
- Attendance: 878,016 (76 shows)
- Box office: $71.4 million ($93.26 million in 2025 dollars)

Ariana Grande concert chronology
- The Honeymoon Tour (2015); Dangerous Woman Tour (2017); The Sweetener Sessions (2018)

The Dangerous Woman Tour was the third concert tour and the second arena tour by American singer Ariana Grande, in support of her third studio album, Dangerous Woman (2016). It traveled across North America, Europe, Latin America, Asia and Oceania. The tour started on February 3, 2017, in Phoenix, Arizona, and ended on September 21, 2017, in Hong Kong. The tour was temporarily halted on May 22, 2017, due to a terrorist bombing that occurred shortly after the Manchester Arena show, killing 22 concert-goers (excluding the perpetrator) and injuring 1,017 others. After organizing and performing at the One Love Manchester benefit concert, Grande resumed the tour on June 7, 2017, in Paris.

On November 29, 2018, Grande released a four-part docu-series on YouTube titled Dangerous Woman Diaries that included behind-the-scenes footage from the tour, performances as well as the creation of her fourth studio album, Sweetener (2018).

== Background ==
On May 23, 2016, Ariana Grande announced on social media that she would go on tour starting in late 2016 or early 2017 and that fans who ordered her album before May 25 would get a code to purchase tickets before the general public sale. On September 9, 2016, Grande released the dates for the first leg of the tour, beginning on February 3, 2017. Ticket pre-sales for the first leg began on September 20, and general ticket sales began on September 24, 2016. European tour dates were announced on October 20, 2016 for May and June 2017.

On September 22, 2016, Grande announced on Twitter that Victoria Monét and Little Mix would be joining the tour as opening acts throughout the North American leg of the tour. On September 26, 2016, Grande announced that the tour would visit New Zealand and Australia. Bia joined the tour as the opening act for the Europe dates. Grande also scheduled dates in Latin America for June and July 2017, which Sabrina Carpenter will be opening, in Oceania for September 2017, and in Asia for August and September 2017, including in Singapore as part of the F1 Grand Prix.

== Costume design ==
For the show's visual, Grande worked with her stylist, Law Roach and designer Bryan Hearns, creating a more "mature" and "growth" look for Grande. Describing the concept of the outfits used during the shows, Hearns stated: "It's about making an adult Ariana, marrying her silhouette with what's happening in fashion right now, so a big theme is sportswear—everything is oversized, there are straps everywhere, and cool hardware ... It's definitely more edgy, it's more adult, but still playful and young." Talking about the opening look, a high-neck black bodysuit, with a flirty skirt on top, he revealed that the look was designed a day before the first show. He explained: "I slept for four hours. It was stressful, but it was exciting. It was awesome." The look was inspired by Audrey Hepburn. During an interview with Billboard, Hearns said:

Most of the looks are my direct aesthetic, so I put my stamp on it. It was just a certain silhouette that she wanted and certain colors, and that's how we met in the middle. We had a couple of looks that were in her silhouette, which is usually high-waisted bodysuits, shorts, skirts and crop tops. It's very flattering on her so we have a lot of items in that shape.

He also revealed that "everything was a mixture of leather, denim, strappy fabrics and hardware." "We use a lot of sweatshirt fabric because everything is very relaxed-looking. It doesn't have a lot going on in terms of the details." The look styled by Grande during the fourth act of the show, a crop-top with blue denim harem pants, was inspired by '90s styles, mainly the R&B group TLC.

== Concert synopsis ==
Ten minutes and fifty seconds before the show started, a countdown-timer video was projected onto a giant curtain, placed at the back of the stage, showing Grande and two of her dancers and close friends, Brian and Scott Nicholson. At the end of the countdown, 10 dancers emerged onstage, followed by Grande, who wore a black dress and black high-heeled boots. The curtain dropped to show a wider screen, as the show began with "Be Alright". Grande sang while performing vogue-style choreography as dancers in black costumes moved around her. After the song, Grande put on a jacket and performed "Everyday", as red lights dimmed the stage to a background of pyrotechnics. During the performance, the rapper Future appeared in the projected video singing his recorded verse. Next was "Bad Decisions", with elevated platforms and Grande's dancers around her. "Let Me Love You" followed, on a stage dimly lit by blue and white lights. Grande exited lying on an elevated platform that descended under the stage. The song transitioned into an orchestral string interlude followed by a video of Grande, with a purple, blue and pink aura around her, singing the unreleased intro for the original version of Dangerous Woman (formerly titled Moonlight), titled "Intro" (commonly known by fans as "Baby Loves"), that did not appear on the retail release.

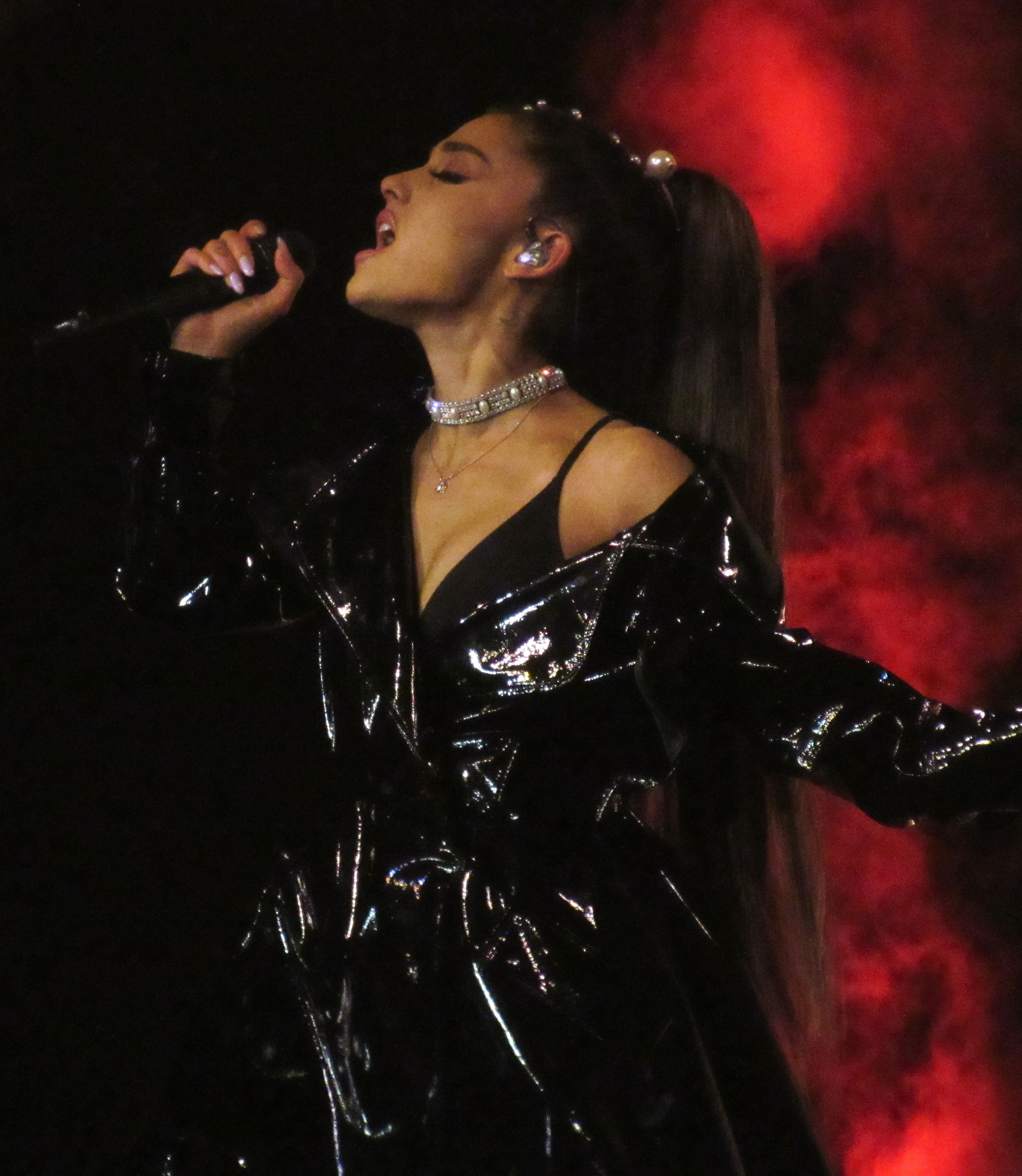
Grande performing "Dangerous Woman"

The second part of the show began with an extended version of "Knew Better" (commonly known as "Knew Better Pt.II") with Grande and her dancers dressed in street-style white clothes, followed by a shortened version of "Forever Boy", featuring colorful stage effects while Grande walked down the catwalk toward the front of the stage. Once at the front of the stage, Grande performed a stripped-down version of "One Last Time", which transitioned back into the original version of the song. After that was "Touch It". Stage projections and visual effects were shown as Grande walked the catwalk and made her way back toward the main part of the stage, where she stood atop an elevated platform. Grande concluded the second part of the show singing "Leave Me Lonely" with laser lighting effects. At the end, an extended version of the song played as Grande went backstage for a costume change and a backing band consisting of guitars, drums, bass and keyboards arrived onstage.

The third part of the show started with a second interlude called "Female" on the video screen; it showed Grande in blonde hair and a leotard posing provocatively as feminist words were displayed, including "empowered", "grounded", "not asking for it" (which repeated multiple times), "raw", "gentle", "sensual", "sexual", "human" and "female". Grande then ascended to the stage wearing a gray bra and a skirt with straps to perform "Side to Side" while she and her dancers rode stationary bicycles on a platform. The stage transformed into a gymnasium with lockers, benches and a chinning bar. Rapper Nicki Minaj was shown on the video screen in scenes from the official music video during her verse. Grande then performed a remixed version of "Bang Bang" with colorful and extreme strobe lighting and laser effects. Next, during "Greedy", fake money with Grande's face on it fell into the audience. Starting with the second leg in Europe, the song swiftly transitioned into "Focus", during which the screen showed scenes from the music video. Grande ended the third part of the show with "I Don't Care" and exited as the band played an extended outro for the song.

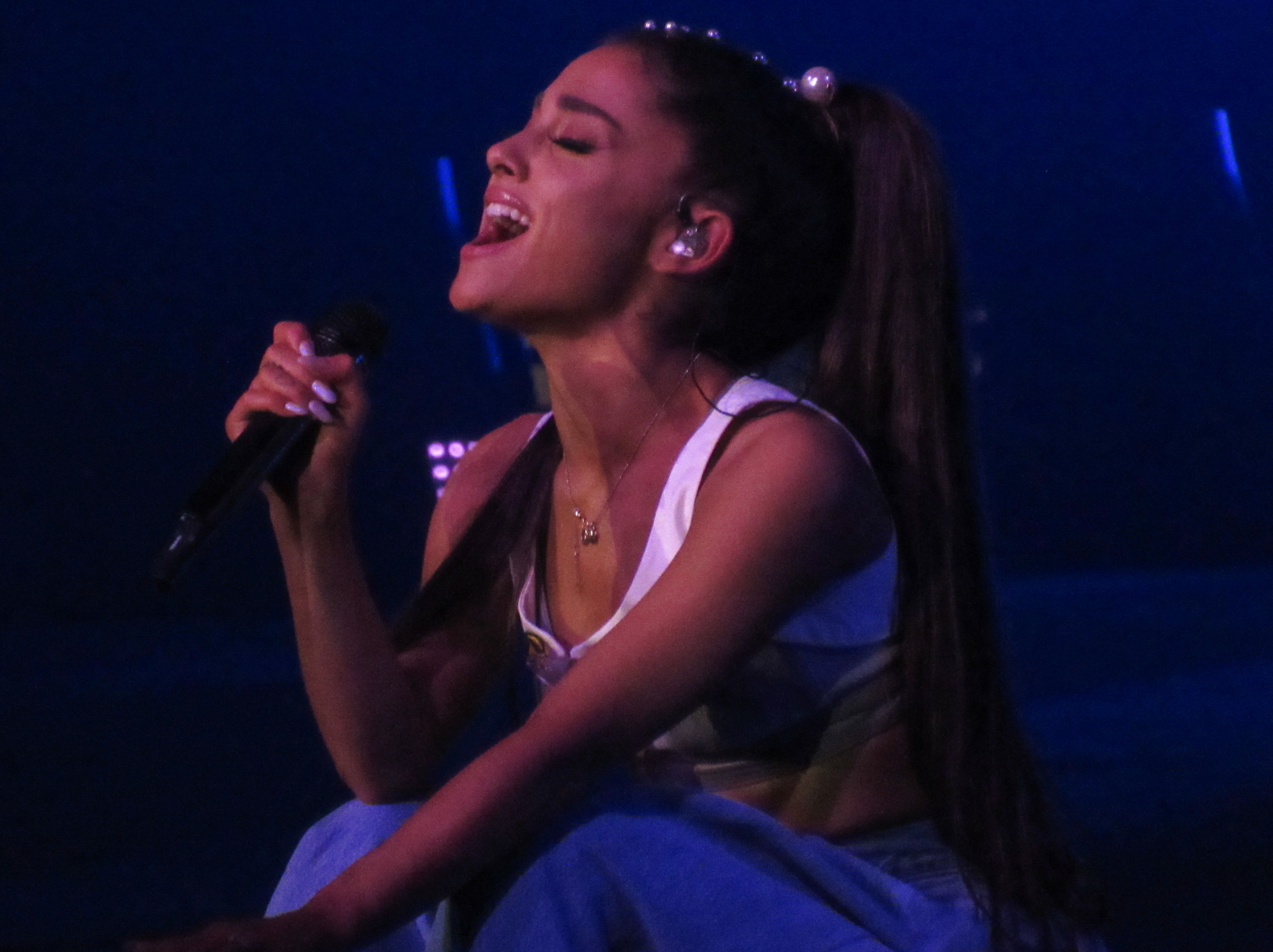
Grande performing "Thinking Bout You"

The fourth part of the show started with Grande returning to the catwalk area of the stage wearing a bra and a pair of denim harem pants with black high-heel shoes (a brown jumpsuit outfit with a crescent moon printed on it wearing white high-heel shoes during the Latin America leg onwards) and singing "Moonlight" as she sat and knelt on the edge of the catwalk in front of a celestial background with celestial projections. Next was "Love Me Harder" and a reworked version of "Break Free" with laser effects around the stage. Grande then spoke to the audience for a bit before performing "Sometimes". While performing, pink balloons fell from the ceiling as she continued to interact with the audience. This is followed by "Thinking Bout You" as the video screen showed colored silhouettes of opposite- and same-sex couples making out. There ensued an optional interchangeable section of the concert, which featured Grande performing anything from the original version of "Honeymoon Avenue" to a cover of Pink + White by Frank Ocean. Beginning with the show in Paris after the Manchester Arena bombing, this part was changed to Grande performing "Somewhere Over the Rainbow". After the interchangeable section came "Problem" with the stage dimmed to blue lights while the dancers carried big blue neon glow sticks, followed by "Into You", which concluded the main set. For the encore, after a two-minute silence, Grande performed "Dangerous Woman" while wearing a black latex dress, with red lighting and pyrotechnics on the stage. After performing, Grande thanked the audience and exited the stage as the band played an extended outro of the song.

== Critical response ==
The Dangerous Woman Tour received generally positive reviews. In a review for Las Vegas Weekly, Ian Caramanzana wrote: "Grande's burly, soulful vibrato and wide range remain the star of her show, and she's at her best when it's just her, a microphone and her band – especially when she performs ballads." Ed Masley commented for The Arizona Republic that Grande has grown "into a self-assured R&B diva with the vocal chops to back up the confident swagger she brought to the stage. ... Vocally, Grande exuded more power and passion than ever, especially on the ballads." Jon Pareles of The New York Times praised Grande for not resorting to shock value. He described the concert as "a show of confidence, prowess and aplomb. ... Onstage, Ms. Grande ... flaunts professionalism, not skin or profanities." Billboard's Kristin Corpuz said of Grande's performance at Madison Square Garden: "She's showing off a more mature sound and edgier image. With outfits custom-made by celebrity fashion designer Bryan Hearns, Grande electrified the Madison Square Garden stage with her four-piece rhythm section and 10 backup dancers." A Billboard report later commented on the last concert of the tour that Grande "more than delivered with her impressive vocal range, sultry dance moves, unstoppable energy and a whirl of costume changes. ... [Through her tour,] Grande has brought people together through music to love and support each other."

In a more mixed review, Chris Kelly of The Washington Post thought that "her gorgeous four-octave soprano was often obscured by her bass-heavy backing band", but he described the show as "a pristine showcase of her immense vocal talent". Dan Hyman of Chicago Tribune opined, "[A]side from a massive projection screen that lived behind the stage and stretched the width of the arena, the production seemed a bit cheap for a show of this scale. ... But it doesn't matter for this gifted singer: all Grande needs do to ... is dial back the bass and belt out some of her magnificent vocal runs."

== Manchester Arena bombing ==
On May 22, 2017, after Grande's show at Manchester Arena in England finished, a shrapnel bomb explosion caused the death of 22 concert-goers and 1,017 injuries. Grande cancelled subsequent tour dates through June 5. Grande organized a benefit concert, One Love Manchester, which took place on June 4 at the Old Trafford Cricket Ground in Manchester, to aid the bombing victims and affected families. By the end of the concert, it had raised £17 million. Grande also re-issued "One Last Time" in addition to a live cover of "Somewhere Over the Rainbow" as charity singles, with all proceeds going to the British Red Cross. Various artists joined Grande for the concert. Alfredo Flores, Grande's tour photographer, told Refinery29 that, after the bombing:

Ariana was nervous, of course, but she was also excited to get back on the road, and so were we. We didn't want terror to win, we didn't want to live in fear, because that's the whole point of terrorism. .... I can't say that if it was another artist they wouldn't have continued with the tour, but I do know that Ariana is super, super brave.

== Set list ==
This set list is representative of the September 21, 2017, show in Hong Kong.

Act I

1. "Be Alright"
2. "Everyday"
3. "Bad Decisions"
4. "Let Me Love You" (outro transitioning to the interlude)

Act II

"Intro" (interlude)

5. "Knew Better / Forever Boy" (contains elements of "Knew Better Pt.II")
6. "One Last Time"
7. "Touch It"
8. "Leave Me Lonely" (with an extended outro / interlude)

Act III

"Female" (interlude)

9. "Side to Side"
10. "Bang Bang" (remix)
11. "Greedy"
12. "Focus" (shortened)
13. "I Don't Care" (with an extended outro / interlude)

Act IV

14. "Moonlight"
15. "Love Me Harder"
16. "Break Free" (remix)
17. "Sometimes"
18. "Thinking Bout You"
19. "Somewhere Over the Rainbow" (Judy Garland cover)
20. "Problem" (remix)
21. "Into You"

Encore

22. "Dangerous Woman"

=== Notes ===
- During the shows in Las Vegas and Omaha, Grande performed a cover of Frank Ocean's "Pink + White".
- During the show in Tulsa, Grande performed the original version of "Honeymoon Avenue".
- During the show in Uncasville and the first show in New York City, Grande performed "Better Days" with Victoria Monét.
- During the shows in Manchester and Buffalo on February 19 and 21, Grande performed "Esta Noche" with Bia.
- During the second show in New York City, Grande performed "Jason's Song (Gave It Away)" with Jason Robert Brown.
- During the show in Inglewood and the third show in Tokyo, Grande performed "The Way" with Mac Miller.
- Starting with the show in Stockholm, "Focus" was added to the set list.
- During the shows in Stockholm, Amsterdam and Dublin, Grande performed "Quit". During the second show in Amsterdam, the song was performed with Cashmere Cat.
- Starting with the show in Paris, "Somewhere Over the Rainbow" was added to the set list.
- During the show in Paris, Grande performed "Dang!" and "The Way" with Mac Miller.
- During the show in Singapore at the 2017 Singapore Grand Prix, "Knew Better", "Forever Boy", "Touch It", "Moonlight", "Sometimes", "Thinking Bout You" and "Problem" were not performed.

== Shows ==
List of concerts, showing date, city, country, venue, opening acts, tickets sold, number of available tickets and amount of gross revenue
Date (2017)	City	Country	Venue	Opening acts	Attendance (tickets sold / available)	Revenue
North America
February 3	Phoenix	United States	Talking Stick Resort Arena	Victoria Monét; Little Mix	11,489 / 12,739	$737,148
February 4	Las Vegas	United States	MGM Grand Garden Arena	Victoria Monét; Little Mix	9,437 / 10,787	$845,275
February 7	Omaha	United States	CenturyLink Center Omaha	Victoria Monét; Little Mix	9,672 / 13,444	$424,500
February 9	Tulsa	United States	BOK Center	Victoria Monét; Little Mix	7,343 / 7,995	$384,832
February 14	Nashville	United States	Bridgestone Arena	Victoria Monét; Little Mix	11,472 / 11,472	$614,544
February 17	Uncasville	United States	Mohegan Sun Arena	Victoria Monét; Little Mix	6,301 / 6,301	$696,265
February 19	Manchester	United States	SNHU Arena	Victoria Monét; Bia (Note: Due to their performance at the 2017 Brit Awards, Little Mix could not perform at the February 19 & 21 concert. Bia was the replacement act.)	7,447 / 8,698	$491,876
February 21	Buffalo	United States	KeyBank Center	Victoria Monét; Bia	8,646 / 13,693	$577,237
February 23	New York City	United States	Madison Square Garden	Victoria Monét; Little Mix	26,635 / 26,635	$2,923,027
February 24	New York City	United States	Madison Square Garden	Victoria Monét; Little Mix	26,635 / 26,635	$2,923,027
February 26	Cleveland	United States	Quicken Loans Arena	Victoria Monét; Little Mix	14,011 / 14,011	$969,214
February 27	Washington, D.C.	United States	Verizon Center	Victoria Monét; Little Mix	13,579 / 13,578	$961,756
March 1	Philadelphia	United States	Wells Fargo Center	Victoria Monét; Little Mix	14,079 / 14,079	$909,258
March 3	Boston	United States	TD Garden	Victoria Monét; Little Mix	12,944 / 12,944	$1,105,421
March 5	Toronto	Canada	Air Canada Centre	Victoria Monét; Little Mix	14,503 / 14,503	$1,036,610
March 6	Montreal	Canada	Bell Centre	Victoria Monét; Little Mix	13,287 / 13,287	$842,563
March 9	Columbus	United States	Nationwide Arena	Victoria Monét; Little Mix	14.414 / 14,414	$911,976
March 11	Indianapolis	United States	Bankers Life Fieldhouse	Victoria Monét; Bia (Note: Due to their performance at the 2017 Kids' Choice Awards, Little Mix could not perform at the March 11 concert. Bia was the replacement act.)	13,020 / 13,020	$935,956
March 12	Auburn Hills	United States	The Palace of Auburn Hills	Victoria Monét; Little Mix	12,437 / 12,437	$829,626
March 14	Chicago	United States	United Center	Victoria Monét; Little Mix	13,584 / 13,584	$989,255
March 16	Saint Paul	United States	Xcel Energy Center	Victoria Monét; Little Mix	14,736 / 14,736	$949,262
March 18	Kansas City	United States	Sprint Center	Victoria Monét; Little Mix	13,382 / 13,382	$850,414
March 21	Salt Lake City	United States	Vivint Smart Home Arena	Victoria Monét; Little Mix	20,840 / 20,840	$1,284,595
March 23	Seattle	United States	KeyArena	Victoria Monét; Little Mix	11,783 / 11,783	$802,916
March 24	Vancouver	Canada	Rogers Arena	Victoria Monét; Little Mix	13,213 / 13,213	$951,207
March 26	Sacramento	United States	Golden 1 Center	Victoria Monét; Little Mix	12,776 / 12,776	$908,963
March 27	San Jose	United States	SAP Center	Victoria Monét; Little Mix	12,113 / 12,642	$1,092,023
March 30	Anaheim	United States	Honda Center	Victoria Monét; Little Mix	11,547 / 11,547	$1,042,336
March 31	Inglewood	United States	The Forum	Victoria Monét; Little Mix	12,874 / 12,874	$1,047,815
April 3	Denver	United States	Pepsi Center	Victoria Monét; Little Mix	13,172 / 13,172	$876,163
April 6	San Antonio	United States	AT&T Center	Victoria Monét; Little Mix	12,960 / 12,960	$720,344
April 8	Houston	United States	Toyota Center	Victoria Monét; Little Mix	11,548 / 11,548	$901,670
April 9	Dallas	United States	American Airlines Center	Victoria Monét; Little Mix	13,204 / 13,204	$957,931
April 11	New Orleans	United States	Smoothie King Center	Victoria Monét; Little Mix	7,574 / 12,580	$507,455
April 12	Atlanta	United States	Philips Arena	Victoria Monét; Little Mix	11,285 / 11,285	$780,827
April 14	Miami	United States	American Airlines Arena	Victoria Monét; Little Mix	12,673 / 12,673	$964,439
April 15	Orlando	United States	Amway Center	Victoria Monét; Little Mix	12,574 / 12,574	$946,615
Europe
May 8	Stockholm	Sweden	Friends Arena	Victoria Monét; Bia	14,106 / 14,106	$995,461
May 10	Oslo	Norway	Telenor Arena	Victoria Monét; Bia	12,129 / 12,412	$752,062
May 12	Herning	Denmark	Jyske Bank Boxen	Victoria Monét; Bia	9,111 / 14,578	$655,222
May 14	Amsterdam	Netherlands	Ziggo Dome	Victoria Monét; Bia	31,801 / 31,815	$1,638,610
May 16	Amsterdam	Netherlands	Ziggo Dome	Victoria Monét; Bia	31,801 / 31,815	$1,638,610
May 18	Birmingham	England	Genting Arena	Victoria Monét; Bia	11,554 / 12,036	$738,618
May 20	Dublin	Ireland	3Arena	Victoria Monét; Bia	12,595 / 12,804	$792,166
May 22	Manchester	England	Manchester Arena	Victoria Monét; Bia	14,158 / 14,218	$883,825
June 7	Paris	France	AccorHotels Arena	KnowleDJ; Victoria Monét	15,121 / 15,442	$1,020,450
June 9	Lyon	France	Halle Tony Garnier	KnowleDJ; Victoria Monét	9,551 / 9,833	$518,788
June 11	Lisbon	Portugal	MEO Arena	KnowleDJ; Victoria Monét	13,573 / 16,239	$755,290
June 13	Barcelona	Spain	Palau Sant Jordi	KnowleDJ; Victoria Monét	11,483 / 16,273	$917,766
June 15	Rome	Italy	PalaLottomatica	KnowleDJ; Victoria Monét	7,287 / 7,558	$362,100
June 17	Turin	Italy	Pala Alpitour	KnowleDJ; Victoria Monét	11,211 / 11,249	$740,175
Latin America
June 29	Rio de Janeiro	Brazil	Jeunesse Arena	DJ Ronaldinho; Sabrina Carpenter	10,337 / 12,370	$731,303
July 1	São Paulo	Brazil	Allianz Parque	DJ Ronaldinho; Sabrina Carpenter	24,717 / 27,300	$1,605,750
July 3	Santiago	Chile	Movistar Arena	Victoria Monét	9,100 / 9,442	$994,977
July 5	Buenos Aires	Argentina	DirecTV Arena	Victoria Monét; Oriana Sabatini	8,623 / 8,727	$964,260
July 9	Alajuela	Costa Rica	Coca-Cola Amphitheater	Échele Miel; Fátima Pinto; Victoria Monét; CNCO	11,141 / 11,141	$776,744
July 12	Mexico City	Mexico	Palacio de los Deportes	Victoria Monét	36,284 / 40,278	$2,078,842
July 13	Mexico City	Mexico	Palacio de los Deportes	Victoria Monét	36,284 / 40,278	$2,078,842
Asia
August 10	Tokyo	Japan	Makuhari Event Hall	Beverly	52,035 / 59,817	$6,525,600
August 12	Tokyo	Japan	Makuhari Event Hall	Little Glee Monster	52,035 / 59,817	$6,525,600
August 13	Tokyo	Japan	Makuhari Event Hall	Little Glee Monster	52,035 / 59,817	$6,525,600
August 15	Seoul	South Korea	Gocheok Sky Dome	—N/a	19,422 / 20,008	$1,876,580
August 17	Bangkok	Thailand	Impact Arena	—N/a	9,308 / 9,694	$1,283,740
August 21	Manila	Philippines	SM Mall of Asia Arena	—N/a	9,607 / 10,400	$1,199,770
August 26	Beijing	China	LeSports Center	—N/a	7,997 / 8,023	$1,099,220
August 28	Shanghai	China	Mercedes-Benz Arena	—N/a	11,225 / 11,225	$1,391,210
August 30	Guangzhou	China	Guangzhou Sports Arena	—N/a	10,287 / 10,792	$1,247,490
Oceania
September 2	Auckland	New Zealand	Spark Arena	—N/a	10,606 / 11,593	$954,738
September 4	Melbourne	Australia	Rod Laver Arena	—N/a	23,809 / 24,694	$2,420,480
September 5	Melbourne	Australia	Rod Laver Arena	—N/a	23,809 / 24,694	$2,420,480
September 8	Sydney	Australia	ICC Sydney Theatre	—N/a	16,505 / 16,580	$1,625,830
September 9	Sydney	Australia	ICC Sydney Theatre	—N/a	16,505 / 16,580	$1,625,830
September 12	Brisbane	Australia	Brisbane Entertainment Centre	—N/a	10,604 / 10,604	$1,038,680
Asia
September 16 (Note: The concert on September 16, 2017, in Singapore was part of the Formula 1 2017 Singapore Grand Prix.)	Singapore		Marina Bay Street Circuit	—N/a	—N/a	—N/a
September 19	Taipei	Taiwan	Taipei Arena	—N/a	11,570 / 12,673	$1,375,330
September 21	Hong Kong		AsiaWorld–Arena	—N/a	7,740 / 8,796	$1,006,410
Total					878,016 / 984,130 (89%)	$71,038,801

== Cancelled shows ==
List of cancelled concerts, showing date, city, country, venue and reason for cancellation
Date (2017)	City	Country	Venue	Reason
May 25	London	England	The O_{2} Arena	Manchester Arena bombing
May 26	London	England	The O_{2} Arena	Manchester Arena bombing
May 28	Antwerp	Belgium	Sportpaleis	Manchester Arena bombing
May 31	Łódź	Poland	Atlas Arena	Manchester Arena bombing
June 1	Łódź	Poland	Atlas Arena	Manchester Arena bombing
June 3	Frankfurt	Germany	Festhalle	Manchester Arena bombing
June 5	Zürich	Switzerland	Hallenstadion	Manchester Arena bombing
July 14	Guadalajara	Mexico	Arena VFG	Scheduling conflicts
July 18	Monterrey	Mexico	Arena Monterrey	—N/a
July 19	Monterrey	Mexico	Arena Monterrey	—N/a
August 23	Ho Chi Minh City	Vietnam	Quân khu 7 Stadium	Health issues
