= Greedy (Ariana Grande song) =

Song by Ariana Grande

from the album Dangerous Woman
- Released: May 14, 2016
- Recorded: 2015
- Studio: MXM Studios, (Los Angeles), California; Wolf Cousins Studios, Stockholm, Sweden)
- Genre: Disco-pop; R&B; synth-funk
- Length: 3:34
- Label: Republic
- Songwriters: Max Martin; Savan Kotecha; Alexander Kronlund; Ilya Salmanzadeh
- Producers: Max Martin; Ilya

"Greedy" is a song recorded by American singer, songwriter Ariana Grande. The track appears on Dangerous Woman (2016), her third studio album. The song was written by Max Martin, Savan Kotecha, Alexander Kronlund, and Ilya Salmanzadeh (known mononymously as Ilya), and produced by Martin and Ilya. The song was released on May 14, 2016, as an instant gratification track to accompany digital pre-orders of Dangerous Woman. Grande debuted "Greedy" on Apple Music the day after "Everyday".

== Recording and production ==
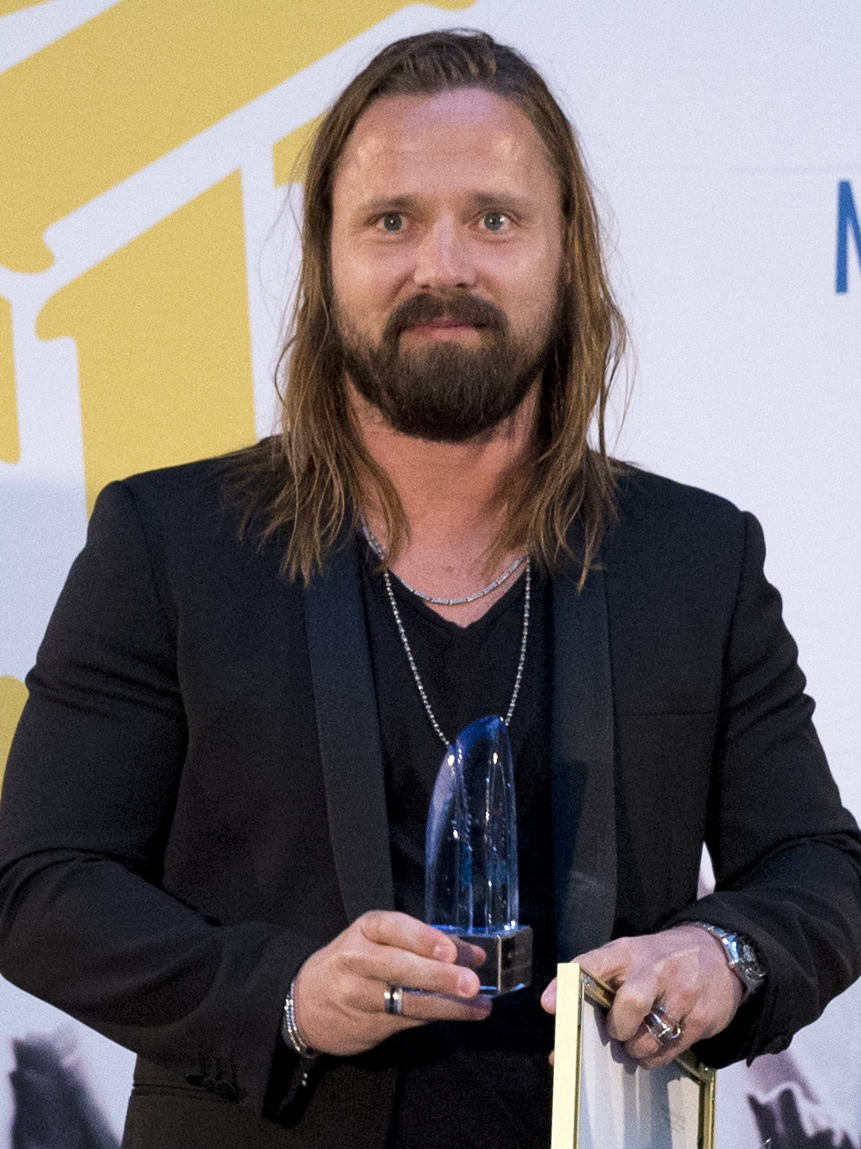
Max Martin (pictured in 2015) co-wrote and co-produced the song.

"Greedy" was written by Alexander Kronlund, Ilya Salmanzadeh, Savan Kotecha and Max Martin who also produced the song with Salmanzadeh. The horn arrangement was provided by Jonas Thander who also performed saxophone, the musicians Karl Olandersson and Stefan Persson contributed with trumpet, Martin played the keyboards, percussion, guitars, drums and programming with Salmanzadeh. The song recorded in two studios: MXM Studios located in Los Angeles, California and Wolf Cousins Studios in Stockholm, Sweden. The mixing for "Greedy" was performed by Serban Ghenea at MixStar Studios, Virginia Beach, Virginia, with engineering for the mix by John Hanes. It was mastered at Sterling Sound in New York City, New York by Tom Coyne and Aya Merrill.

== Composition ==
"Greedy" (2016)
A 23-second sample of "Greedy" demonstrating the musical style which critics praised and compared to Mark Ronson's and Bruno Mars' 2014 song "Uptown Funk".

According to the sheet music published by Kobalt Music Publishing America, Inc. on the site Musicnotes.com, the song is composed in the key of E♭ minor and F minor in 4/4 time signature with a tempo of 108 beats per minute. Grande's vocals range spans from the low note F#_{3} to the high note C#_{6} A disco-pop, R&B, and synth-funk song, "Greedy" opens with Grande introducing the title using high vocal register, the first verse contains a "groovy bass" and faster breathy vocals harmonizes around the end of each line.

As noted by Adam.R Holz of Plugged In (publication), the first verses uses a suggestive double entendre about sexual attraction. The pre-chorus is backed by synths that dropped out during the refrain where Grande singing: "Baby, you got lucky cause you're rocking with the best"/"And I'm greedy"/I ain't talking money, I'm just physically obsessed." Describing the lyrics, the editor Alex Rhiannon noted that "she describes a relationship in which it sounds like she's been trying to hold herself back and be chill, but she can't take it any longer, and needs to tell the guy how she feels." Horns, bass and drums are introduced during the chorus.

== Critical reception ==
"Greedy" received critical acclaim from music critics. Billboard's critic Katie Atkinson described the song as a "throwback trifle, which casts Grande as a lady Bruno Mars." While Christopher R. Weingarten from Rolling Stone call the song as "uptown dunky of nonsense". Annie Zaleski from The A.V. Club commented: "The horn-peppered highlight “Greedy” in particular is an exuberant R&B-pop earworm on which she has a blast indulging her inner gospel diva. A reviewer from Sputnikmusic call it as "slick and incredibly fun" and wrote the song "does all it can to save an otherwise middling second half of the album'. Reviewing the album Dangerous Woman, Digital Spy's Lewis Corner described it as "a shiny disco-pop number with a groove so infectious the World Health Organization would have good grounds to label it an epidemic. And there's good reason for that, because the moral of this story is that Ariana has caught all the feels for her new boyfriend and she wants more, more, more."

Auin Moreland of Pitchfork considered "Greedy" one of the highlights on the album, the editor described it as a romp that announces that Grande truly shines when she is given center stage. Reviewing the song for Nylon, Jenna Igneri wrote positively: "Greedy" is everything you'd expect from the petite pop princess. It's upbeat and catchy, and very Ariana Grande, as she belts out lyrics such as, "You know that I'm greedy for love." There's no doubt that it'll have you dancing all summer long."

== Live performances ==
To promote Dangerous Woman, Grande performed "Greedy" on Good Morning America as a part of the "Central Park Summer Concert", during the show she also performed "Dangerous Woman" and "Be Alright". She also performed the song as part of her album showcase for Vevo on May 21, 2016.

Grande performed the song during the Summertime Ball 2016. The song was included on the set list of her Dangerous Woman Tour during its performance, during which counterfeit money featuring Grande's face hit the stage.

== Usage in other media and covers ==
Drag queens Nina Bo'nina Brown and Valentina lip-synced to the song during the ninth season of the American reality competition television series RuPaul's Drag Race. In the lip-sync, Valentina wore a mask over her face as she did not know the words, and was stopped by RuPaul and later eliminated, with Bo'nina Brown staying.

In 2017, Irene and Seulgi of the South Korean girl group Red Velvet did a duo performance of the song at their concerts.

On December 29, 2017, South Korean girl group Twice performed the song at the 2017 KBS Song Festival. Only four out of the nine members performed (Nayeon, Momo, Jihyo and Chaeyoung).

== Credits and personnel ==
Credits adapted from Dangerous Woman's liner notes.

Recording and management

- Recorded at MXM Studios and Wolf Cousins Studios (Stockholm, Sweden)
- Mixed at MixStar Studios (Virginia Beach, Virginia)
- Mastered at Sterling Sound (New York City, New York)
- Published by MXM – administered by Kobalt – (ASCAP), Wolf Cousins (STIM) and Warner/Chappell Music Scand. (STIM)

Personnel

- Ariana Grande – lead vocals, vocal arranger
- Max Martin – songwriting, production, programming, keyboard, guitar, bass, percussion, background vocals
- Savan Kotecha – songwriting, background vocals
- Ilya Salmanzadeh – songwriting, production, programming, keyboard, guitar, bass, percussion, background vocals
- Alexander Kronlund – songwriting
- Jonas Thander – horns arranger, recorder, saxophone
- Staffan Findin – trombone
- Karl Olandersson – trumpet
- Stefan Persson – trumpet
- Serban Ghenea – mixing
- Peter Karlsson – vocal editing
- Sam Holland – engineering
- John Hanes – mixing engineering
- Tom Coyne – mastering
- Aya Merrill – mastering

== Charts ==
Chart (2016)	Peak position
France (SNEP)	194
Israel (Media Forest)	7
Portugal (AFP)	86
South Korea International (Gaon)	18
UK Singles (Official Charts)	113

== Certifications ==
Region	Certification	Certified units/sales
Australia (ARIA)	Gold	35,000^{‡}
Brazil (Pro-Música Brasil)	Platinum	60,000^{‡}
New Zealand (RMNZ)	Gold	15,000^{‡}
United Kingdom (BPI)	Silver	200,000^{‡}
United States (RIAA)	Platinum	1,000,000^{‡}
^{‡} Sales+streaming figures based on certification alone.
