= Let Me Love You (Ariana Grande song) =

2016 promotional single by Ariana Grande featuring Lil Wayne

Promotional single by Ariana Grande featuring Lil Wayne

from the album Dangerous Woman
- Released: April 18, 2016
- Recorded: August 1, 2014 – August 24, 2014
- Studio: Vietnom (Stockholm)
- Genre: R&B
- Length: 3:43
- Label: Republic
- Songwriters: Thomas Brown; Victoria McCants; Steven Franks; Ariana Grande; Dwayne Carter; Matthew O'Brien; Jeremy Felton; Markous Roberts
- Producers: Brown; Franks; FKi

Ariana Grande promotional singles chronology
"Be Alright" (2016)	"Let Me Love You" (2016)	"Jason's Song (Gave It Away)" (2016)

Music video
- "Let Me Love You" on YouTube

"Let Me Love You" is a song by American singer Ariana Grande, featuring American rapper Lil Wayne, from her third studio album Dangerous Woman (2016). It was written by the artists alongside Victoria Monét and producers Tommy Brown and Steven Franks. The song was released as the second promotional single from the album on April 18, 2016. A slow-paced, sultry R&B track, "Let Me Love You" features delicate piano chords, electro-beats, smooth, deep bass, trap-lite, hip-hop beats, and interspersed vocals. Lyrically, the song talks about getting over an ex and laying on the chest of someone new.

A music video for the song, directed by Grant Singer, was released on May 16, 2016. During its first week, the music video was available to watch exclusively on Apple Music. It shows Grande in various intimate settings, with an appearance by Wayne. The music video spawned a nomination for Best Collaboration Video at the 2016 MTV Video Music Awards.

== Background and release ==
"Let Me Love You" was the first song Grande recorded for the album, which initially was called "Moonlight". It was written and recorded in late 2014, as stated by Grande during an interview with Ryan Seacrest. On March 11, 2016, Grande revealed four tracks from the tracklist of Dangerous Woman, with one being "Let Me Love You", which was said to have American rapper Lil Wayne as a featured guest. Wayne had previously rapped about Grande on his track "London Roads" off his album Free Weezy Album (2015). Ten days later, Grande teased a snippet of the track through her Snapchat account. She also stated that it was one of her favorite verses of his ever and that they felt like "old school Lil Wayne". On April 18, 2016, "Let Me Love You" was released as the album's second promotional single.

== Composition and lyrics ==
"Let Me Love You" was written by Thomas Brown, Victoria McCants, Steven Franks, Grande, and Dwayne Carter (Lil Wayne); the song was produced by Brown and Franks. It features American rapper Lil Wayne and contains an interpolation of the song "All the Time", recorded by Jeremih, Wayne and Natasha Mosley, and produced by FKi. "Let Me Love You" is "a slow-paced sultry jam", having a laid back R&B melody, delicate piano chords, electro-beats, smooth, deep bass, a steady beat, trap-lite sound, hip-hop beats, and interspersed vocals. It features Grande's whispering vocals, while also having "sultry, breathy falsetto singing and belted-out vocal runs." In the chorus, her vocals are stuttered. Wayne appears halfway through the track, and near the end they sing back and forth until it fades out. Grande's vocals on the song span from the low note of E_{3} to the high note of D_{5}.

Lyrically, "Let Me Love You" talks about getting over an ex and laying on the chest of someone new. Digital Spy's Lewis Corner observed that "[Grande]'s just chilling and 'looking for love' while she's lying on some hunk's chest", which he concluded as "a one-night stand", as seen in the lines: "I just broke up with my ex, now I'm out here single/ I don't really know what's next, but I ain't even tripping, I'ma chill and sit back/ I know they'll be coming from the right and the left, left, left." Wayne responds to her verses with what was considered "catchy word play", such as "she's grinding on this Grande", which turns the singer's last name into a sexual innuendo. "And when it comes to that nigga, I'll give her amnesia / She just looking for love / She says she's single and I'm her feature, oh my God," he finishes his rap.

== Critical reception ==
Stephen Thomas Erlewine of AllMusic picked the track as one of the album's highlights, praising the producers for "shepherding many of the cuts with a heavier R&B influence". Larry Bartleet of NME named it one of the album's "nudge-nudge moments". Daniel Kreps of Rolling Stone called it a "slow-burning, stifling track" that has "smoky late-night vibes." Corner noted that "the darker, sexier, and slower production certainly suggests this is a song for the early hours, rather than a romantic dinner for two." Sal Cinquemani of Slant Magazine was positive, writing that "despite the track's de rigueur chopped-up vocals standing in for an actual hook, the impeccably produced 'Let Me Love You' is reminiscent of Brandy's 'Angel in Disguise,' right down to Grande's breathy, hypnotic lead vocal." John Hil of Noisey thought the song was "interesting" and felt excited about the other collaborations on the record.

Wren Graves of Consequence of Sound opined that, "The hook relies on the kind of electronic vocal manipulations we associate with a weaker voice, say Selena Gomez, but the verses are Grande at her mewling best." Spin's Andrew Unterberger stated that the song is "not quite irresistible, but it's mildly alluring". Carolyn Menyes of Music Times claimed that it "may miss the sort of fiery hook that helped Grande's similarly-themed hit 'Love Me Harder' such a success, but it gels flawlessly with the subdued offerings Grande has showed so far from what is sure to be her most mature record to date." Quinn Moreland of Pitchfork was more mixed with Wayne's appearance, claiming that it was "one of Dangerous Woman's more surprising features, yet perhaps predictably", feeling that he seems "sleepy". Nathan Wisnicki of Pretty Much Amazing agreed, calling it "tuneless" and that it has "a really lazy hook".

== Music video ==
Despite not being released as a single, a music video for the song was directed by Grant Singer, produced by Jordan Harkins, and released exclusively on streaming platform service Apple Music on May 15, 2016. A week later, on May 22, the music video was released on her YouTube and Vevo channel (the same day her music video for "Into You" was released). As stated by Gil Kaufman of Billboard, "For the most part, Ariana lounges around on her bed and couch in her black leather bustier, shorts and high heels asking a new man if she can love him. And then Lil Wayne shows up in a puff of smoke trailing some XXL promises." The music video spawned a nomination for Best Collaboration at the 2016 MTV Video Music Awards. It surpassed 100 million views on October 25, 2016, making it Grande's thirteenth Vevo-certified music video after "Side to Side".

== Credits and personnel ==
Recording

- Recorded at Vietom Studios
- Mixed at MixStar Studios, Virginia Beach, California
- Mastered at Sterling Sound

Personnel

- Ariana Grande – vocals, writing, production
- Thomas Brown – writing, production, engineer, programming, keys, drums, percussion
- Victoria McCants – writing
- Steven Franks – writing, production, programming, drums, percussion
- Dwayne Carter – writing, vocals
- Serban Ghenea – mixing
- John Hanes – mixing engineer
- Christopher Truio – engineer
- Nicholas Audino – engineer, bass, percussion, programming, keys, drums
- Tom Coyne – audio mastering
- Aya Merrill – audio mastering

Credits adapted from the liner notes of Dangerous Woman, Republic Records.

== Charts ==
Chart performance for "Let Me Love You"
Chart (2016)	Peak position
Australia (ARIA)	88
Canada Hot 100 (Billboard)	73
France (SNEP)	164
Portugal (AFP)	76
Scottish Singles Sales (Official Charts)	86
South Korea International (Circle)	39
UK Hip Hop/R&B (Official Charts)	30
US Billboard Hot 100	99

== Certifications ==
Certifications for "Let Me Love You"
Region	Certification	Certified units/sales
Australia (ARIA)	Platinum	70,000^{‡}
Brazil (Pro-Música Brasil)	2× Platinum	120,000^{‡}
Denmark (IFPI Danmark)	Gold	45,000^{‡}
New Zealand (RMNZ)	Platinum	30,000^{‡}
Poland (ZPAV)	Gold	10,000^{‡}
Portugal (AFP)	Gold	5,000^{‡}
United Kingdom (BPI)	Gold	400,000^{‡}
United States (RIAA)	2× Platinum	2,000,000^{‡}
^{‡} Sales+streaming figures based on certification alone.
