= Dangerous Woman =

- Standard cover

Studio album by Ariana Grande
- Released: May 20, 2016
- Studios: Vietnom, MXM and Wolf Cousins (Stockholm, Sweden); Glenwood Place (Burbank, California); Milkboy (Philadelphia, Pennsylvania); Willow-Valley (Gothenburg, Sweden); Audible Images (Pittsburgh, Pennsylvania); Windmark (Santa Monica, California); P.S. (Chicago, Illinois)
- Genres: Pop; R&B
- Length: 39:32
- Label: Republic
- Producers: Tommy Brown; Max Martin; Johan Carlsson; Twice as Nice; Ilya; Steven Franks; Tommy McClendon; Travis Sayles; The Magi; Ali Payami; Peter Svensson; Billboard; Peter Carlsson

Ariana Grande chronology
Christmas & Chill (2015)	Dangerous Woman (2016)	The Best (2017)

Singles from Dangerous Woman
- 1. "Dangerous Woman" Released: March 11, 2016; 2. "Into You" Released: May 6, 2016; 3. "Side to Side" Released: August 30, 2016; 4. "Everyday" Released: January 10, 2017

Dangerous Woman is the third studio album by American singer-songwriter Ariana Grande. It was released through Republic Records on May 20, 2016. Serving as the album's executive producer alongside Max Martin and Savan Kotecha, Grande began work on Dangerous Woman shortly after the release of her second studio album, My Everything (2014). Guest vocals on the album are provided by Nicki Minaj, Lil Wayne, Macy Gray and Future.

Lyrically, Dangerous Woman revolves around love, tumultuous relationships and empowerment, with Grande exploring more mature and explicit subject matter. Primarily a pop and R&B record, it also incorporates a wide variety of subgenres, including dance-pop, disco, soul, house, trap, reggae and electropop. It was met with critical acclaim, receiving praise for Grande's vocal performance, the matured lyrical content and its versatility across different musical styles. Dangerous Woman was included in several year-end best music lists for 2016. The album and its singles were nominated for various accolades, including two Grammy Awards. Its success led to Grande winning Artist of the Year at the American Music Awards in 2016, and won International Album of the Year at the Japan Gold Disc Awards in 2017. The album has sold 20 million units worldwide, becoming Grande's best-selling album and one of the best-selling albums of all time.

Dangerous Woman was supported by four singles, including the US Billboard Hot 100 top-ten hits "Side to Side" and "Dangerous Woman", as well as international top-ten hit "Into You". It debuted at number two on the US Billboard 200 and remains Grande's only album not to debut at number one to date. Despite this, it ultimately became her best-performing album in the country at that point in her career. Internationally, the album topped record charts in Australia, Brazil, Italy, Ireland, New Zealand, Spain and the United Kingdom, where it became Grande's first chart-topper. To support the album, Grande embarked on the Dangerous Woman Tour in 2017, which grossed over $71 million upon completion.

== Background and conception ==
On August 25, 2014, Grande released her second studio album, My Everything, which debuted at number one on the US Billboard 200 and sold 169,000 copies in its first week. Months after its release, she revealed that her third studio album could be titled Moonlight, making reference to the title on her Twitter account. Following rumors about the album's release date, Grande announced the lead single of Moonlight, called "Focus", (Note: Although originally intended to be the lead single, "Focus" was not included on the standard or deluxe editions of Dangerous Woman. However, it was included as a bonus track on the Japanese edition of the album.) during her appearance on The Tonight Show Starring Jimmy Fallon on September 15, 2015. The song was released digitally on October 30; it debuted and peaked at number seven on the US Billboard Hot 100, selling 113,000 copies in its first week. The song was certified platinum by the Recording Industry Association of America (RIAA), and had sold 425,000 copies as of May 2016. In an interview to UK station KISS-FM, Grande described the song as stylistically distinct from the rest of the album, stating that it was "the only one that sort of sounds like that". She also expressed excitement about dedicating uninterrupted time to completing Moonlight and focusing on its music.

A really long time ago I was convinced that it was going to be called Moonlight because its [sic] one of my favorite songs that we did for the album. And now, as we're wrapping things up, of course I've been writing and singing, we're at the final stretch... now there's this other song that has thrown me for a whirlwind and I love it so much, it's changed everything."

— Grande, talking about changing the name of the album

However, after months of speculation, while discussing the album's direction in interview with Jimmy Kimmel Live!, Grande revealed that she had reconsidered the title Moonlight despite initially intending to name the project after one of her favorite songs from the record. She explained that another track created during the final stages of production had "changed everything", which led her to consider renaming the album. The new title of the album was revealed to be Dangerous Woman; she posted a photo on Instagram with a caption quoting Egyptian feminist writer Nawal El Saadawi's 1975 novel, Woman at Point Zero: "They said, 'You are a savage and dangerous woman.' I am speaking the truth. And the truth is savage and dangerous." As to why the album name was changed, Grande stated that it had to do with portraying herself as a stronger person and to empower fans, saying: "'Moonlight' is a lovely song, and it's a lovely title. It's really romantic, and it definitely ties together the old music and the new music, but 'Dangerous Woman' is a lot stronger. [...] To me, a dangerous woman is someone who's not afraid to take a stand, be herself and to be honest."

The cover artwork of Dangerous Woman features Grande wearing a latex bunny mask while portraying a seductive image in contrast to the covers of her previous albums. In an interview with Chris Martins for Billboard, Grande explained that the cover was inspired by her alter ego, "Super Bunny", stating: "The Super Bunny is my superhero, or supervillain—whatever I'm feeling on the day. Whenever I doubt myself or question choices I know in my gut are right—because other people are telling me other things—I'm like, 'What would that bad bitch Super Bunny do?' She helps me call the shots." Grande finished work on the album in January 2016.

== Recording and production ==
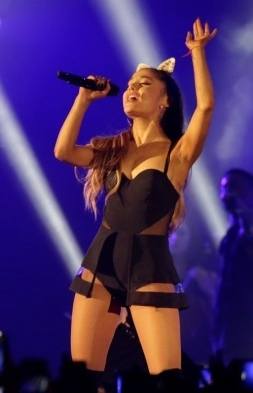
Grande performing at the Honeymoon Tour on August 26, 2015

For Dangerous Woman's production, Grande worked with several music producers, including Max Martin and Savan Kotecha, who she worked with as executive producers. She began recording songs for the album soon after the completion of My Everything; Grande continued it throughout the summer and fall of 2015, between stops on the Honeymoon Tour, with her friends Tommy Brown and Victoria Monét. Commenting on the album's direction, Grande described it as a more "mature" and "evolved" version of her sound, combining R&B and pop influences with a comparatively darker and "sexier" tone. She also praised Martin for his approach to songwriting and production, describing his understanding of music as resembling "math". The musician Ilya Salmanzadeh likewise contributed to the album, producing and writing songs with Martin, Grande, Kotecha and Alexander Kronlund. They developed several tracks present in the album, including "Into You", "Side to Side", "Greedy", "Everyday", "Bad Decisions" and "Touch It", while the title track was produced by Johan Carlsson and Martin. All songs were recorded at MXM Studios in Los Angeles, California, and also at Wolf Cousins Studios located in Stockholm, Sweden, and mixed by Serban Ghenea at MixStar Studios in Virginia Beach. Grande wrote the song "Moonlight" with Monét, who also sang backing vocals.

Dangerous Woman features guest appearances by several artists such as Lil Wayne, Future and Nicki Minaj; About the choice of collaborators, Grande said: "I love working with artists people don't expect me to work with." During the recording sessions for "Everyday", Grande wanted to work with Future despite initially being uncertain whether their contrasting musical styles would be compatible. She later stated that they ultimately "found a dope vibe" for the song together. Grande also included Minaj on "Side to Side", stating: "I love working with her". Singer Macy Gray was invited to record "Leave Me Lonely" after she met with Republic Records's A&R, Wendy Goldstein. In an interview with Fuse, Grande explained that Gray became involved with the song while the album was nearing completion, and stated that the song initially existed as a demo sung by its songwriter before Gray was approached and recorded her vocals shortly afterward.

== Music and lyrics ==
Dangerous Woman is mainly rooted in pop and R&B, expanding on the contemporary R&B of My Everything while incorporating a more sophisticated interpretation of 1990s pop music. The album further encompasses sounds of dance-pop, contemporary pop, orchestral pop, house, and electro. Critics highlighted the contrast between the jazzy elements of "Moonlight", the electronic production of "Into You" and "Everyday", the disco influences of "Greedy", and the 1990s house-inspired "Be Alright".

Dangerous Woman opens with the doo wop throwback track "Moonlight", which was originally intended as the title track. Lewis Corner from Digital Spy described the song as a "[19]50s-inspired sway", which blossoms with its dainty string plucks and romantic violins. Critics noted that the song's sound was reminiscent of Grande's debut studio album, Yours Truly (2013). The reviewer from Sputnikmusic described it as "oozing with 1950s vibes and allowing Ariana's gorgeous vocals to do all the heavy lifting." The writer compared the song to the Yours Truly song "Tattooed Heart", commenting that "although it functions as a serviceable opener, it lacks that addictingly sweet chorus to elevate it beyond being just a pretty introduction to the record." An R&B track combining elements of bubblegum and rock and roll, "Dangerous Woman" has a 6/8 time signature. The third track, "Be Alright", is heavily inspired by 1990's R&B and house, featuring Chicago house and dance-pop influences. Christopher R. Weingarten of Rolling Stone called the track a "tropical house swagger-jack". In the 1990s dance-pop "Be Alright", Grande sings during the first line: "Midnight shadows / When finding love is a battle / But daylight, is so close / So don't you worry 'bout a thing." "Into You" is a dance-pop track, featuring "a thudding club beat, lurking synths and sharp clicks", according to Corner. The track starts with "a minimal club beat" before "crescendoing into [a] thumping chorus", where "an uptempo disco backline explodes into a monstrous club-ready hook", as noted by Bustle's S. Atkinson and Complex's Jessie Morris. Jessica Goodman of Entertainment Weekly added that the song also has "new-age disco beats". Lyrically, the song features Grande singing of "waiting for her love interest to stop the conversation and finally make a move".

"Side to Side"
A sound sample of the reggae-pop song "Side to Side", featuring guest appearance from rapper and singer Nicki Minaj. The sample shows Grande singing the chorus accompanied by a guitar, snaps and drums. Lyrically, "Side to Side" talks about soreness after sex.

"Side to Side" is a reggae-pop song that features guest vocals by Nicki Minaj. Lyrically, it talks about soreness after sex. In an interview with MTV News reporter Gaby Wilson, Grande explained that it "is about riding leading to soreness". According to Sean Fitz-Gerald of Vulture, "Let Me Love You"—a duet with rapper Lil Wayne—is "a slow-paced sultry jam", having a laid back R&B melody, delicate piano chords, electro-beats, smooth, deep bass, a steady beat, trap-lite sound, hip hop beats, and interspersed vocals. Lyrically, "Let Me Love You" talks about getting over an ex and laying on the chest of someone new. Corner observed that "[Grande]'s just chilling and 'looking for love' while she's lying on some hunk's chest", which he concluded as "a one-night stand". The disco-pop, funk and R&B song "Greedy" received positive comments by music critics, who praised its production comparing to Mark Ronson's "Uptown Funk" featuring Bruno Mars (2014). (Note: Attributed to multiple sources) Billboard's Katie Atkinson described the song as a "throwback trifle, which casts Grande as a lady Bruno Mars". "Leave Me Lonely" featuring Macy Gray is an R&B track with soul influences. Describing the song, Brittany Spanos from Rolling Stone wrote: "If you combined these songs with similarly retro material from her debut record ('Honeymoon Avenue', 'Tattooed Heart') you could probably make a good case for Grande as a rock-friendly voice that could be critically adored like Adele or Amy Winehouse." "Everyday" featuring Future is a woozy electropop and trap song, built around a grinding, tinned dance beat and a thrumming bassline. The song's explicit lyrics are a paean to sexual satisfaction; Grande illustrates a steamy love affair and lathers on flirtation. During his verse, Future raps about lavish vacations and late-night endeavors, describing himself as a bad guy ideally suited to Grande's needs.

"Greedy"
A 23-second sample of "Greedy" demonstrating the musical style which critics praised and compared to Mark Ronson's and Bruno Mars's 2014 song "Uptown Funk".

The tenth track, "Sometimes", is an R&B song; Annie Zaleski of The A.V. Club noted that it features folky acoustic guitar flourishes, distracting electronic production and vocal effects. While "I Don't Care" was described by Rolling Stone editor Christopher Weingarten as a Chicago soul-influenced song, it opens with strings that drop off in the first verse, where Grande sings among clips and R&B beats. NME's Larry Bartlet noted that it is "genuinely satisfying to hear her put that sentiment on record so resoundingly". In "Bad Decisions", Grande sings, "I've been doing stupid things, wilder than I've ever been", with Mikael Wood of Los Angeles Times noting "a tune whose message initially appears clear: 'I sinned, I'm sorry, let's move on.' She blames the behavior on a boy, then admits she's enjoying it." Musically, "Bad Decisions" is a hip hop track. "Touch It" is an EDM-inspired song, with Grande singing the chorus over a "scuzzy bassline", as noted by Corner. Maeve McDermott of USA Today described the song as "dramatic and dark" and noted a sound comparable to works of R&B artist the Weeknd. "Knew Better / Forever Boy" consists of two integrated songs, which last for a duration of 4:59. The first part of the song is the R&B "Knew Better", which pairs Grande's distorted vocals with "pounding" synths. The second part is the deep house "Forever Boy". The last track of the album is the ballad "Thinking Bout You", which features a pulsating "thudding kick beat".

The Target deluxe edition features two new songs, while the Japan deluxe edition includes the bonus track "Focus". "Jason's Song (Gave It Away)" is a jazz song, co-written and produced by musician Jason Robert Brown who composed the track inspired by Broadway productions. In the song, Grande sings among piano notes: "I'm no blow-up doll, no free-for-all, no slave to your decision / Gotta find a way to break the spell, to get the hell away from those who block my vision." According to Elias Light from Rolling Stone, the track uses a backdrop of light, cocktail soul for a declaration of independence.

== Release and promotion ==
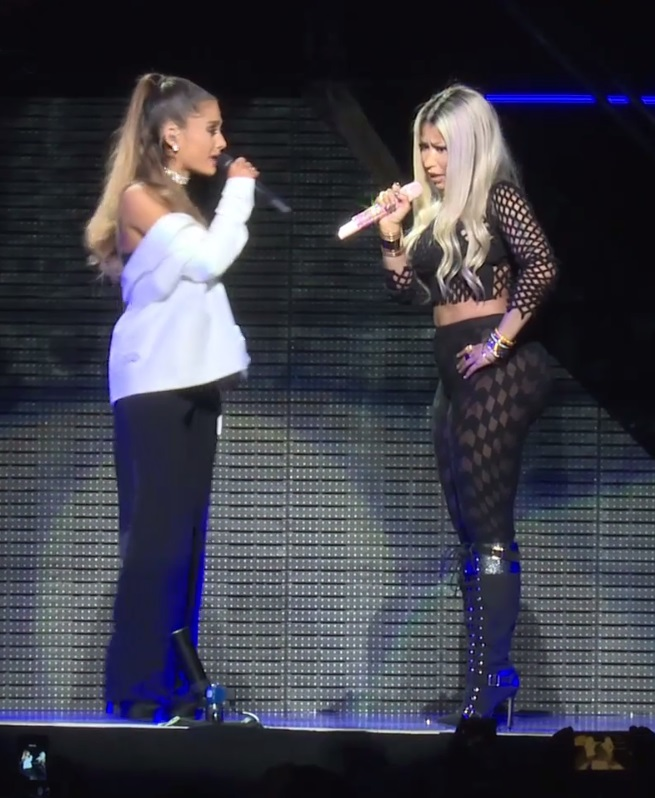
Grande (right) and Minaj (left) performing at the T-Mobile Arena Grand Opening in Las Vegas

Grande announced the final title of Dangerous Woman on February 22, 2016, via her Snapchat. Two days later, she launched a website to promote her album, which featured a "Tea" section in which the singer shared new information regarding the album, as well as a "Shop" section, in which album-related merchandise was sold. Dangerous Woman's cover artwork was released on March 10, along with the title track's release. The next day, the album was made available for pre-order through the iTunes Store. On March 12, Grande was both the host and musical guest on NBC's Saturday Night Live, where she performed "Dangerous Woman" and "Be Alright". In April, Grande debuted "Leave Me Lonely" live at the grand opening of the Las Vegas' T-Mobile Arena, and performed "Dangerous Woman" at the MTV Movie Awards.

On May 13, Grande announced that a new song from Dangerous Woman would be premiered exclusively on Apple Music every day until the release of the album. Grande promoted the album's release with televised performances at the Billboard Music Awards, and on Jimmy Kimmel Live! and Good Morning America. On May 25, she sang "Into You" and duetted with American singer Christina Aguilera on "Dangerous Woman" at The Voice season 10 finale. At the Summertime Ball at London's Wembley Stadium in June, Grande performed "Dangerous Woman", "Into You", and "Greedy" from the album as part of her set. Grande later performed at the MTV Video Music Awards with Minaj to promote the album's third single. She also appeared on The Tonight Show with Jimmy Fallon on September 8, and on The Ellen DeGeneres Show the same month. On November 20, at the American Music Awards, Grande performed "Side to Side" with Minaj, and won Artist of the Year. In December, Grande was a performer at four of iHeartRadio's Jingle Ball shows.

The tenth anniversary edition of Dangerous Woman was released on May 20, 2026, featuring an additional track "Knew Better Part Two". The edition became available via digital download and streaming services, alongside various 2LPs featuring 2016 and 2026 cover artworks.

=== Singles ===
Dangerous Woman's lead single is the title track, "Dangerous Woman", released on March 11, 2016, along with the pre-order of the album on the iTunes Store. The track earned 118,000 digital downloads in its opening week, debuting at number ten on the US Billboard Hot 100—becoming Grande's seventh Hot 100 top ten and fifth to debut in the top ten. The single also made Grande the first artist in the chart's 57-year history to debut in the top 10 with the lead single from each of her first three albums. It was later serviced to radio on March 15 and reached a new peak of number 8 in its eleventh week. In April 2021, "Dangerous Woman" was certified quadruple platinum by the Recording Industry Association of America (RIAA), nominated for Best Pop Solo Performance at the 59th Grammy Awards. A week later of the song's release, the first promotional single of Dangerous Woman, "Be Alright", was released. The song debuted and peaked at number 43 on the US Billboard Hot 100.

"Let Me Love You" (featuring Lil Wayne), the second promotional single of Dangerous Woman, was released on April 18. It debuted and peaking at number 99 on the US Billboard Hot 100. The second single "Into You" was released to digital on May 6, being serviced to US mainstream and rhythmic radio stations on June 28. The song debuted at number 83 and climbed nine places from 22 to a new peak of number 13 in the US in its thirteenth week on the chart dated August 27, aided in part by 69-cent sale-pricing in the iTunes Store. It became her second top 20 single from Dangerous Woman in the country. The single was later certified 7× platinum by the RIAA for shipments of over 7 million in the US, hitting the top 20 in several other regions as well. In the United Kingdom, it peaked at number 14 on the UK Singles Chart, making it her sixth UK top 20 single.

"Side to Side", featuring Nicki Minaj, was released on August 30, as the album's third single. It debuted at number 31 and later peaked at number 4 on the US Billboard Hot 100 for two non-consecutive weeks, becoming Grande's first top-five single from Dangerous Woman. It also became her second single to top the US Mainstream Top 40 airplay chart and Minaj's first. As of March 2018, "Side to Side" has sold over 6 million equivalent units in the United States being certified sextuple platinum by the RIAA. Internationally, it reached number 4 on the UK Singles Chart and on the Canadian Hot 100, number 3 on the Australian charts and number 2 in the New Zealand charts. Its music video, directed by Hannah Lux Davis, made its premiere on American clothing brand Guess's website on August 28. The third promotional single, "Jason's Song (Gave It Away)", was released on September 16. It was followed by her performance at The Tonight Show Starring Jimmy Fallon on September 19, and is included as the bonus track of the album.

Featuring Future, "Everyday" was serviced to rhythmic contemporary playlists in the US on January 10, 2017, being the album's fourth and final single. Its lyric video was released on February 1, and its music video on February 27. Serviced to the US contemporary hit radio on February 14, "Everyday" debuted at number eighty-five on the US Billboard Hot 100 and reached number fifty-five in April. It was certified 2× platinum by the RIAA for shipments of over 2 million in the United States.

=== Tour ===
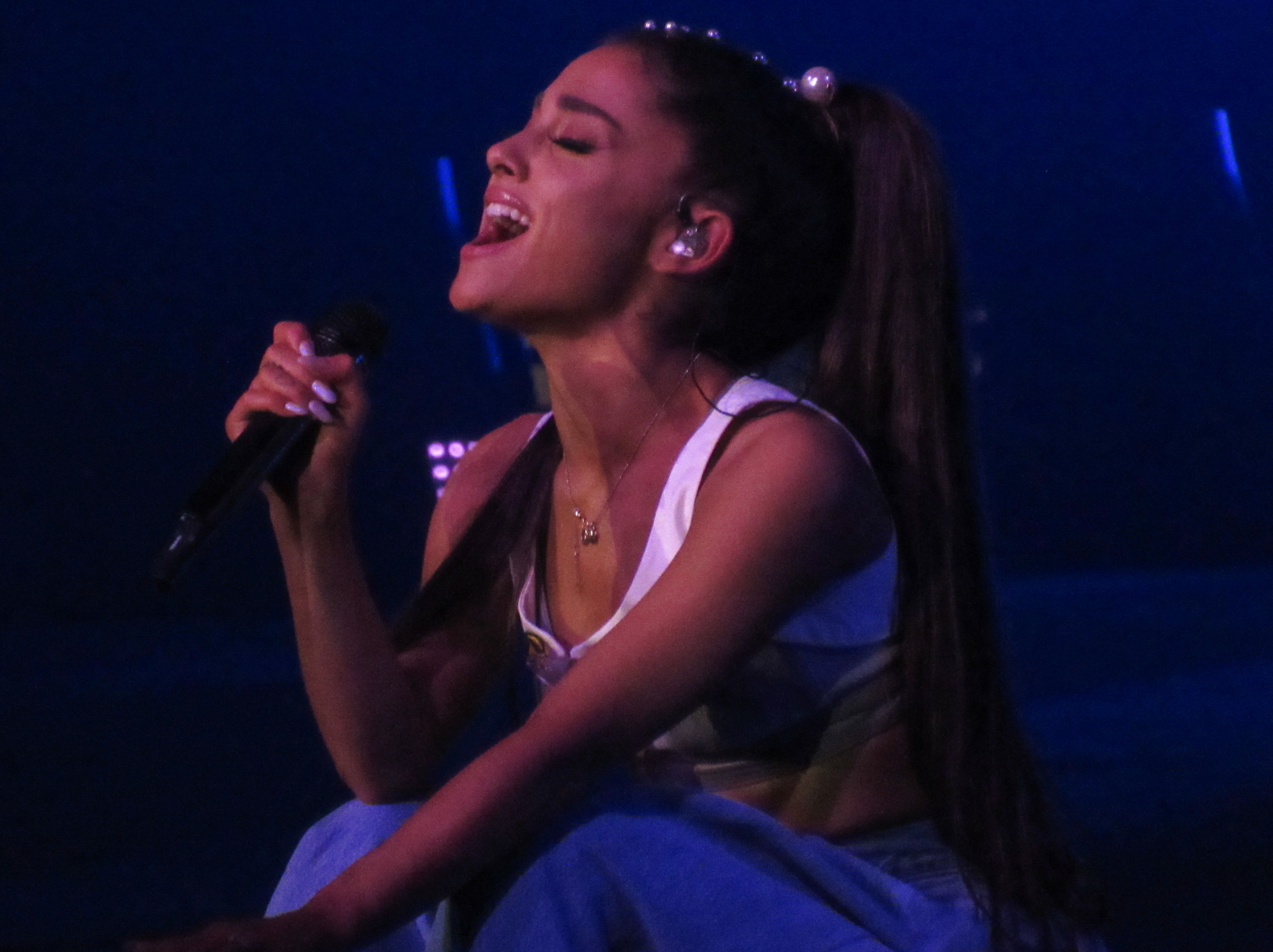
Grande performing "Thinking Bout You" during the Dangerous Woman Tour

On September 9, 2016, Grande released the dates for the first leg of Dangerous Woman's accompanying tour, the Dangerous Woman Tour. Its ticket pre-sales began on September 20 and tickets going on general sale on September 24. The US leg started on February 2, 2017, in Phoenix, Arizona and ended on April 15 in Orlando, Florida. The UK and European tour started on May 18 at Genting Arena in Birmingham, concluding on June 17 at Palapitour in Turin.

On May 22, at the conclusion of Grande's concert at Manchester Arena in England, a terrorist suicide bombing killed 22 concert-goers and injured 1,017. Grande was not injured during the bombing; she offered her condolences through Twitter for those affected by the attack, suspending the tour through to June 5 and organizing the One Love Manchester benefit concert on June 4 to raise money for the victims. The tour was concluded in Hong Kong on September 22 at AsiaWorld-Expo.

== Critical reception ==
Professional ratings
Aggregate scores
Source	Rating
AnyDecentMusic?	6.9/10
Metacritic	76/100
Review scores
Source	Rating
AllMusic	4/5 stars
The A.V. Club	B
Entertainment Weekly	B+
NME	4/5 stars
The Observer	4/5 stars
Pitchfork	7.6/10
Rolling Stone	3/5 stars
Slant Magazine	3.5/5 stars
Sputnikmusic	3.5/5 stars
Spin	6/10

Dangerous Woman received positive reviews from music critics. According to Metacritic, which assigns a weighted average score out of 100 to ratings and reviews from mainstream critics, critics gave Dangerous Woman a score of 76, based on 14 reviews, indicating "generally favorable reviews".

Stephen Thomas Erlewine, for AllMusic, highlighted the album's movement between torch songs, "heavy hip" influences, and pop material, while he praised Grande's "measured, assured performance" throughout the record. In his review for Entertainment Weekly, Nolan Feeney felt that Dangerous Woman was more cohesive than My Everything, noting that Grande explores pop, R&B, reggae, and house styles without "overextending herself or pandering to trends". The A.V. Club's Annie Zaleski likewise considered the record to have "more personality" than My Everything, and described Dangerous Woman as a progression for Grande as both a vocalist and performer. Lewis Corner from Digital Spy praised it for maintaining consistency across its 15-track runtime, while Mikael Wood—writing for the Los Angeles Times—found it "impressive how fully she inhabits the emotional environment of each song" on the album.

Larry Bartleet of NME praised the album's "consistent songwriting" and viewed its themes of empowerment as more "honest" than comparable releases by some of Grande's contemporaries, including Demi Lovato's Confident and Selena Gomez's Revival. Michael Cragg from The Observer noted that during her successful previous album she had lost her identity in the process, but in comparison, he noted that the album is a "refinement of her sound", and concluded that "held together by Grande's skyscraping voice, Dangerous Woman throws a lot at the wall and, brilliantly, most of it sticks." Erik Ernst of Milwaukee Journal Sentinel opined that "like much of the disc, it's an unexpected, but remarkable, choice from a confident pop star ready to set her own path to the top." Maeve McDermott of USA Today summarized that Dangerous Woman, "like its title suggests", is "a mature portrait of an artist blessed with one of pop's strongest voices, brimming with potential hits." Quinn Moreland of Pitchfork viewed that "Grande does not need to force any sort of spirit, she is full of it already. She just needs to find the Dangerous Woman within herself and let her break free."

The Plain Dealer's Troy L. Smith wrote that the album "plays it safe and smart", explaining it "functions as My Everything 2.0 – a collection of pitch-perfect hooks and slick production built in the mold of Mariah Carey." For Theon Weber of Spin, "Grande is most complete on record when she's playing a diva." Sal Cinquemani of Slant Magazine wrote that Grande "too often tries to look and sound more mature than she is", observing that "the songs on the album's latter half are limited by their strict adherence to contemporary pop and R&B trends." In a mixed review, Christopher R. Weingarten of Rolling Stone opined that "as an album artist, she's prone to a schizophrenic sound and unfortunate sequencing," adding that "we're still no closer to figuring out who she wants to be." He also said that "her talents are wasted on meaningful-sounding but ultimately trite lyrics. However, her phrasing remains unique and powerful and pyrotechnic."

=== Year-end lists ===
Publication	List	Rank	Ref.
Sputnikmusic	Best Albums of 2016	45	
Complex	50 Albums of 2016	49	
Digital Spy	20 Best Albums of 2016	4	
Entertainment Weekly	50 Best Albums of 2016	27	
Fuse	20 Best Albums of 2016	6	
Idolator	10 Best Albums of 2016	10	
Pitchfork	20 Best Pop and R&B Albums of 2016	—N/a	
The Guardian	40 Best Albums of 2016	30	
Rolling Stone	20 Best Pop Albums of 2016	11	
Billboard	50 Best Albums of 2016	22	

=== Accolades ===
Year	Organization	Award	Result	Ref.
2017	Grammy Awards	Best Pop Vocal Album	Nominated	
2017	Japan Gold Disc Awards	International Album of the Year	Won	
2017	Japan Gold Disc Awards	Best 3 Albums (International)	Won	
2017	Juno Awards	International Album of the Year	Nominated	
2017	People's Choice Awards	Favorite Album	Nominated	

== Commercial performance ==
In the United States, Dangerous Woman debuted at number two on the Billboard 200—making it her only album that failed to reach the top spot—since it was blocked from the top spot by Canadian rapper Drake's 2016 album, Views. Dangerous Woman earned 175,000 units with 129,000 coming from pure album sales. In the second week, it dropped to number six, selling another 50,000 equivalent units, while it slipped to number seven with 33,000 equivalent units sold in the third week. As of June 2020, the album has sold 429,000 pure copies in the country. On May 20, 2026, Dangerous Woman was certified triple platinum by the RIAA for combined album sales, on-demand audio, video streams and track-sale equivalent of three million units.

In Japan, Dangerous Woman debuted at number two on the Oricon Albums Chart, selling 20,811 copies in its opening week—becoming Grande's highest album ranking in that region. In its second week, the album dropped to number eight by selling 11,950 copies, and it stayed at number eight with 7,022 copies sold in the third week. As of June 2016, Dangerous Woman has sold 50,000 copies in the country, certified Gold for shipments of 125,000 copies in September.

In the United Kingdom, the album debuted at number one on the Official Albums Chart, her first number one album in the UK. The album also reached the top of the charts in several other markets, including Australia, Brazil, Ireland, Italy, Netherlands, New Zealand, Norway, and Spain. At the end of the year, Dangerous Woman was placed as the twenty-eighth best selling album of 2016, according to International Federation of the Phonographic Industry (IFPI), selling 900,000 copies worldwide that year. According to Billboard, the album has sold more than 20 million global units, as of May 2026.

== Track listing ==
Standard edition
No.	Title	Writer(s)	Producer(s)	Length
1.	"Moonlight"	Thomas Brown; Victoria McCants; Peter Lee Johnson; Ariana Grande	T. Brown	3:22
2.	"Dangerous Woman"	Johan Carlsson; Ross Golan; Max Martin	Martin^{[a]}; Carlsson^{[a]}	3:55
3.	"Be Alright"	Grande; T. Brown; McCants; Khaled Rohaim; Nicholas Audino; Lewis Hughes; Willie Tafa; Neo Joshua; Alexander Crossan	Twice as Nice; T. Brown	2:59
4.	"Into You"	Martin; Savan Kotecha; Alexander Kronlund; Ilya Salmanzadeh; Grande	Martin; Ilya	4:04
5.	"Side to Side" (featuring Nicki Minaj)	Martin; Kotecha; Kronlund; Salmanzadeh; Onika Maraj; Grande	Martin; Ilya	3:46
6.	"Let Me Love You" (featuring Lil Wayne)	T. Brown; McCants; Steven Franks; Grande; Dwayne Carter; Matthew O'Brien; Jeremy Felton; Markous Roberts	T. Brown; Franks; FKi	3:43
7.	"Greedy"	Martin; Kotecha; Kronlund; Salmanzadeh	Martin; Ilya	3:34
8.	"Leave Me Lonely" (featuring Macy Gray)	T. Brown; McCants; Thomas Parker Lumpkins; Franks	Lumpkins; T. Brown^{[a]}; Franks	3:49
9.	"Everyday" (featuring Future)	Kotecha; Salmanzadeh; Grande; Nayvadius DeMun Wilburn	Ilya^{[a]}; Martin^{[b]}	3:14
10.	"Bad Decisions"	Martin; Kotecha; Salmanzadeh; Grande	Martin; Ilya	3:46
11.	"Thinking Bout You"	Mathieu Jomphe-Lépine; Peter Svensson; Jacob Kasher Hindlin; Chloe Angelides	Svensson; Billboard; Ilya^{[b]}; Carlsson^{[b]}^{[c]}	3:20
Total length:				39:32

Deluxe and reissue edition
No.	Title	Writer(s)	Producer(s)	Length
10.	"Sometimes"	Martin; Kotecha; Svensson; Salmanzadeh	Martin; Ilya	3:46
11.	"I Don't Care"	T. Brown; McCants; Travis Sayles; Franks; Michael Foster; Ryan Tedder; Grande	T. Brown; Sayles; Franks; The Magi	2:58
13.	"Touch It"	Martin; Kotecha; Svensson; Ali Payami; Grande	Martin; Payami	4:20
14.	"Knew Better / Forever Boy"	T. Brown; Franks; Grande; McCants; Foster; Tedder	T. Brown^{[a]}; Franks; McCants^{[b]}	4:59
Total length:				55:35

Tenth anniversary edition
No.	Title	Writer(s)	Producer(s)	Length
16.	"Step on Up"	T. Brown; McCants; Shane Stevens; Audino; Ryan Vojtesak; Hughes; Jamil Chammas	T. Brown; Twice as Nice; McCants^{[b]}; Vojtesak^{[d]}	3:01
17.	"Jason's Song (Gave It Away)"	Jason Robert Brown; Grande	J. Brown; Jeffrey Lesser	4:25
18.	"Knew Better Part Two"	Grande; Foster; Franks; T. Brown; McCants	Foster; Franks; T. Brown	2:45
Total length:				65:52

=== Notes ===
- ^{^[a]} signifies a main and vocal producer.
- ^{^[b]} signifies a vocal producer.
- ^{^[c]} Peter Carlsson is incorrectly credited as Peter Karlsson.
- ^{^[d]} signifies a co-producer.
- Deluxe edition tracks are inserted into the existing track sequence, advancing all subsequent entries by one position without omitting any original songs.
- "Step on Up" and "Jason's Song (Gave It Away)" were initially available exclusively on the US Target CD edition, and later appeared on the digital fifth anniversary edition.
- Japanese edition includes the standalone single "Focus", and a DVD featuring the music and a capella video for "Dangerous Woman", and the music and lyric video for "Focus". Japanese Christmas edition includes a bonus disc which features Grande's 2015 EP Christmas & Chill.
- 2020 Apple Music video edition includes the music videos for "Dangerous Woman", "Into You", "Side to Side", "Let Me Love You", and "Everyday".

== Credits and personnel ==
Credits were adapted from the liner notes.

=== Locations ===
- Vietnom Studios; Stockholm, Sweden (recording: tracks 1, 3, 6, 8, 11, 14, 15)
- MXM and Wolf Cousins Studios; Stockholm, Sweden (recording: tracks 2, 4, 5, 7, 9, 10, 12, 13)
- Glenwood Place Studios; Burbank, California (recording)
- Milkboy Studios; Philadelphia, Pennsylvania (recording)
- Studio Willow-Valley; Gothenburg, Sweden (strings recording: track 7)
- Audible Images; Pittsburgh, Pennsylvania (recording)
- Windmark Studios; Santa Monica, California (recording: track 15)
- P.S. Recording Studios; Chicago, Illinois (recording: track 15)
- MixStar Studios (mixing)
- Sterling Sound (mastering)

=== Vocal credits ===
- Ariana Grande – lead vocals (all tracks), backing vocals (tracks 1, 2, 9, 11)
- Nicki Minaj – featured artist (track 5)
- Lil Wayne – featured artist (track 6)
- Macy Gray – featured artist (track 8)
- Future – featured artist (track 9)
- Jamie Foxx – featured artist (Target and Japanese Editions track 16)
- Mac Miller – featured artist (Christmas Edition track 7)
- Max Martin – background vocals (tracks 4, 7)
- Ilya Salmanzadeh – background vocals (tracks 4, 7, 9, 12), additional background vocals (track 10)
- Savan Kotecha – background vocals (tracks 4, 5, 7, 9, 12), additional background vocals (track 10)
- Johan Carlsson – background vocals (track 2)
- Victoria McCants – background vocals (tracks 1, 3, 8)
- Chloe Angelides – background vocals (track 15)
- Ross Golan – background vocals (track 2)
- Daye Jack – background vocals (track 10)
- Joi Gilliam – background vocals (tracks 5, 7)
- Taura Stinson – background vocals (tracks 5, 7)
- Chonita Gillespie – background vocals (tracks 5, 7)
- Tommy Parker – background vocals (track 8)
- Sam Holland – additional background vocals (track 7)
- Alexander Kronlund – additional background vocals (track 7)
- Jenny Schwartz – additional background vocals (track 7)
- Noah "Mailbox" Passovoy – additional background vocals (track 7)
- Silke Lorenzen – additional background vocals (track 7)
- Jeremy Lertola – additional background vocals (track 7)
- Patrick Donovan – additional background vocals (track 7)
- Charlie Puth – beatbox (track 2) (Note: In an interview with Elvis Duran Show, Puth stated that he worked on the second track's beatbox, which can be "barely heard".)

=== Technical credits ===
- Ariana Grande – vocal arranger, vocal production
- Tommy Brown – engineer and programming (tracks 1, 3, 6, 8, 11, 14), keyboards (tracks 1, 3, 6, 11), percussion (tracks 1, 3, 11), bass and drums (track 3)
- Serban Ghenea – mixing (all tracks)
- Tom Coyne – mastering (all tracks)
- Aya Merrill – mastering (all tracks)
- Peter Lee Johnson – strings (tracks 1, 8)
- Christopher Truio – engineer (tracks 1, 3, 6, 11, 14)
- Nicholas Audino – engineer (tracks 1, 3, 6, 11, 14); programming, keyboards, bass, percussion, and drums (track 3)
- John Hanes – mixing engineer (all tracks)
- Steven Franks – programming (tracks 6, 8, 11, 14), keyboards (track 11), guitar (track 1), percussion (tracks 6, 11), drums (track 6)
- Dernst Emile II – bass (track 1)
- Johan Carlsson – guitar, acoustic guitar, piano, synthesizers, tambourine, programming, and guitar solo (track 2)
- Max Martin – programming (tracks 2, 4, 5, 7, 10, 12); keyboards, guitar, bass, and percussion (tracks 4, 5, 7, 10, 12); additional programming and keyboards (track 15)
- Peter Karlsson – engineer (track 2), vocal editing (tracks 4, 7, 12, 13)
- Sam Holland – engineer (tracks 2, 4, 5, 7, 9, 10, 12, 13, 15)
- Cory Brice – engineer (track 2)
- Khaled Rohaim – programming, keyboard, bass, and percussion (track 3)
- Savan Kotecha – vocal engineer (track 15)
- Ilya Salmanzadeh – programming, keyboards, bass, and percussion (tracks 4, 5, 7, 9, 10, 12); guitar (tracks 4, 5, 7, 10, 12); additional programming and keyboards (track 15)
- Aubry "Big Juice" Delaine – engineer for Nicki Minaj verse (track 5)
- Joel Metzler – assistant engineer for Nicki Minaj verse (track 5)
- Jordon Silva – assistant engineer for Nicki Minaj verse (track 5)
- Mattias Bylund – string arrangement, strings, strings engineer, and strings editing (track 7)
- Mattias Johansson – violin (track 7)
- David Bukovinszky – cello (track 7)
- Jonas Thander – horn arrangement, horn engineer, and saxophone (track 7)
- Staffan Findin – trombone (track 7)
- Karl Olandersson – trumpet (track 7)
- Stefan Persson – trumpet (track 7)
- Thomas Parker Lumpkins – programming (track 8)
- Christopher Trujillo – engineer (track 8)
- Jeremy Lertola – guitar (track 9)
- Peter Svensson – programming, keyboards, guitar, bass, and percussion (track 15)
- Travis Sayles – programming, keyboards, and bass (track 11)
- Michael Foster – programming and percussion (track 11)
- Ryan "Ryghteous" Tedder – programming, keyboards, and bass (track 11)
- Loren Mann II – additional drums (track 11)
- Josh Connelly – guitar (track 11)
- Ali Payami – programming, keyboards, guitar, bass, and percussion (track 13)
- Billboard – programming, keyboards, bass, and percussion (track 15)

== Charts ==
=== Weekly charts ===
Chart (2016–2026)	Peak position
Argentine Albums (CAPIF)	4
Australian Albums (ARIA)	1
Austrian Albums (Ö3 Austria)	5
Belgian Albums (Ultratop Flanders)	2
Belgian Albums (Ultratop Wallonia)	6
Brazilian Albums (ABPD)	1
Canadian Albums (Billboard)	2
Croatian International Albums (HDU)	10
Czech Albums (ČNS IFPI)	10
Danish Albums (Hitlisten)	5
Dutch Albums (Album Top 100)	1
Finnish Albums (Suomen virallinen lista)	6
French Albums (SNEP)	8
German Albums (Offizielle Top 100)	5
German Pop Albums (Offizielle Top 100)	1
Greek Albums (IFPI)	4
Hungarian Albums (MAHASZ)	39
Irish Albums (IRMA)	1
Italian Albums (FIMI)	1
Japan Hot Albums (Billboard Japan)	2
Japanese Albums (Oricon)	2
Mexican Albums (Top 100 Mexico)	1
New Zealand Albums (RMNZ)	1
Norwegian Albums (VG-lista)	1
Polish Albums (ZPAV)	4
Portuguese Albums (AFP)	4
Portuguese Albums (AFP) Tenth Anniversary edition	103
Scottish Albums (Official Charts)	3
Slovak Albums (ČNS IFPI)	72
South Korean Albums (Gaon)	21
South Korean International Albums (Gaon)	1
Spanish Albums (Promusicae)	1
Swedish Albums (Sverigetopplistan)	4
Swiss Albums (Schweizer Hitparade)	3
Taiwan Albums (Five Music)	1
UK Albums (Official Charts)	1
US Billboard 200	2

=== Year-end charts ===
Chart (2016)	Position
Australian Albums (ARIA)	53
Belgian Albums (Ultratop Flanders)	75
Belgian Albums (Ultratop Wallonia)	122
Canadian Albums (Billboard)	18
Danish Albums (Hitlisten)	24
Dutch Albums (MegaCharts)	29
French Albums (SNEP)	100
Icelandic Albums (Tónlistinn)	36
Italian Albums (FIMI)	49
Japanese Albums (Billboard Japan)	41
Japanese Albums (Oricon)	49
Mexican Albums (AMPROFON)	31
New Zealand Albums (RMNZ)	46
South Korean International Albums (Gaon)	57
Spanish Albums (PROMUSICAE)	56
Swedish Albums (Sverigetopplistan)	24
UK Albums (OCC)	62
US Billboard 200	26

Chart (2017)	Position
Australian Albums (ARIA)	67
Canadian Albums (Billboard)	26
Danish Albums (Hitlisten)	46
French Albums (SNEP)	176
Japanese Albums (Billboard Japan)	79
Mexican Albums (AMPROFON)	57
New Zealand Albums (RMNZ)	32
South Korean International Albums (Gaon)	99
Swedish Albums (Sverigetopplistan)	45
UK Albums (OCC)	66
US Billboard 200	38

Chart (2018)	Position
Australian Albums (ARIA)	89
UK Albums (OCC)	100
US Billboard 200	162

Chart (2019)	Position
Belgian Albums (Ultratop Flanders)	171
US Billboard 200	192

Chart (2021)	Position
Polish Albums (ZPAV)	75

Chart (2025)	Position
Belgian Albums (Ultratop Flanders)	189

=== Decade-end charts ===
Chart (2010–2019)	Position
US Billboard 200	122

== Certifications ==
List of certifications and sales
Region	Certification	Certified units/sales
Australia (ARIA)	2× Platinum	140,000^{‡}
Austria (IFPI Austria)	Platinum	15,000^{*}
Brazil (Pro-Música Brasil)	2× Platinum	80,000^{‡}
Canada (Music Canada)	4× Platinum	320,000^{‡}
Denmark (IFPI Danmark)	3× Platinum	60,000^{‡}
France (SNEP)	2× Platinum	200,000^{‡}
Finland (Musiikkituottajat)	2× Platinum	40,000
Germany (BVMI)	Gold	100,000^{‡}
Italy (FIMI)	Platinum	50,000^{‡}
Japan (RIAJ)	Gold	100,000^{^}
Mexico (AMPROFON)	3× Platinum	180,000^{‡}
New Zealand (RMNZ)	4× Platinum	60,000^{‡}
Norway (IFPI Norway)	2× Platinum	40,000^{‡}
Poland (ZPAV)	4× Platinum	80,000^{‡}
Portugal (AFP)	Gold	3,500^{‡}
Singapore (RIAS)	2× Platinum	20,000^{*}
South Korea (Gaon)	—	1,849 (Note: Album sales from 2016 and 2017)
Sweden (GLF)	Gold	20,000^{‡}
Switzerland (IFPI Switzerland)	3× Platinum	60,000^{‡}
United Kingdom (BPI)	2× Platinum	600,000^{‡}
United States (RIAA)	3× Platinum	3,000,000^{‡}
Summaries
Worldwide combined sales with streaming	—	20,000,000
^{*} Sales figures based on certification alone.^{^} Shipments figures based on certification alone.^{‡} Sales+streaming figures based on certification alone.

== Release history ==
List of release dates and formats
Region	Date	Version	Format(s)	Label	Ref.
Various	May 20, 2016	Standard; deluxe	CD; digital download	Republic	
United States	September 9, 2016	Deluxe	LP	Republic	
Japan	November 18, 2016	Christmas	CD	Universal	
Various	May 20, 2026	Tenth anniversary	Digital download; LP; streaming	Republic	
