= Be Alright (Ariana Grande song) =

Promotional single by Ariana Grande

from the album Dangerous Woman
- Released: March 18, 2016
- Recorded: June 2015
- Studio: Vietnom (Stockholm)
- Genre: Deep house; R&B
- Length: 2:57
- Label: Republic
- Songwriters: Ariana Grande; Thomas Brown; Victoria McCants; Khaled Rohaim; Nicholas Audino; Lewis Hughes; Willie Tafa; Neo Joshua; Alexander Crossan
- Producers: Twice as Nice; Tommy (TBHits) Brown

Ariana Grande promotional singles chronology
"Best Mistake" (2014)	"Be Alright" (2016)	"Let Me Love You" (2016)

Audio video
- "Be Alright" on YouTube

"Be Alright" is a song recorded by American singer Ariana Grande for her third studio album Dangerous Woman (2016). Grande co-wrote the track with Tommy Brown, Victoria Monét, Khaled Rohaim, Nicholas Audino, Lewis Hughes and Willie Tafa, while its production was handled by Twice as Nice and Brown. "Be Alright" was released as the first promotional single from the album on March 18, 2016. In terms of music, the song is inspired by the 1990s deep house and influenced by R&B and Chicago house. Lyrically, it is a carefree song about being optimistic.

The track was performed live for the first time on Saturday Night Live, with choreography inspired by the vogue style of ballroom culture; the same choreography was adopted by Grande during her Dangerous Woman Tour, in which the song served as opening track. Grande also performed the song as a part of the setlist during her Sweetener World Tour; a live version is included on the tour's live album, K Bye for Now (SWT Live).

== Background and release ==
On June 17, 2015, after finishing recording the song, Ariana Grande released two snippets of the track through her Snapchat account. In the following months, she mentioned the song in other social media, such as Twitter and Instagram. Later, on January 11, 2016, a fan tweeted to Grande about the release of the track to which the singer replied that it was coming very soon. Then, on January 20, 2016, Grande posted another two snippets of "Be Alright" on her Snapchat, with MTV News noting that they "reveal a grooving house beat over which Ari croons, 'Baby, we'll be all right' and 'every little thing's gonna be all right.'" After hearing the snippets, Bianca Gracie of Idolator classified it as "a warmer sound that is within the same vein of previous, more electronic-based collaborations with Cashmere Cat ('Be My Baby' and 'Adore)'," opining that it sounded infinitely more promising than "Focus". On March 11, 2016, she announced on Ryan Seacrest's radio show that she would perform "Be Alright" on the 41st season of Saturday Night Live on March 12, 2016, and that it would be released on March 18, 2016. It served as the album's first promotional single.

A demo version of the song featuring the rap trio Migos was leaked in 2018.

== Composition and lyrics ==
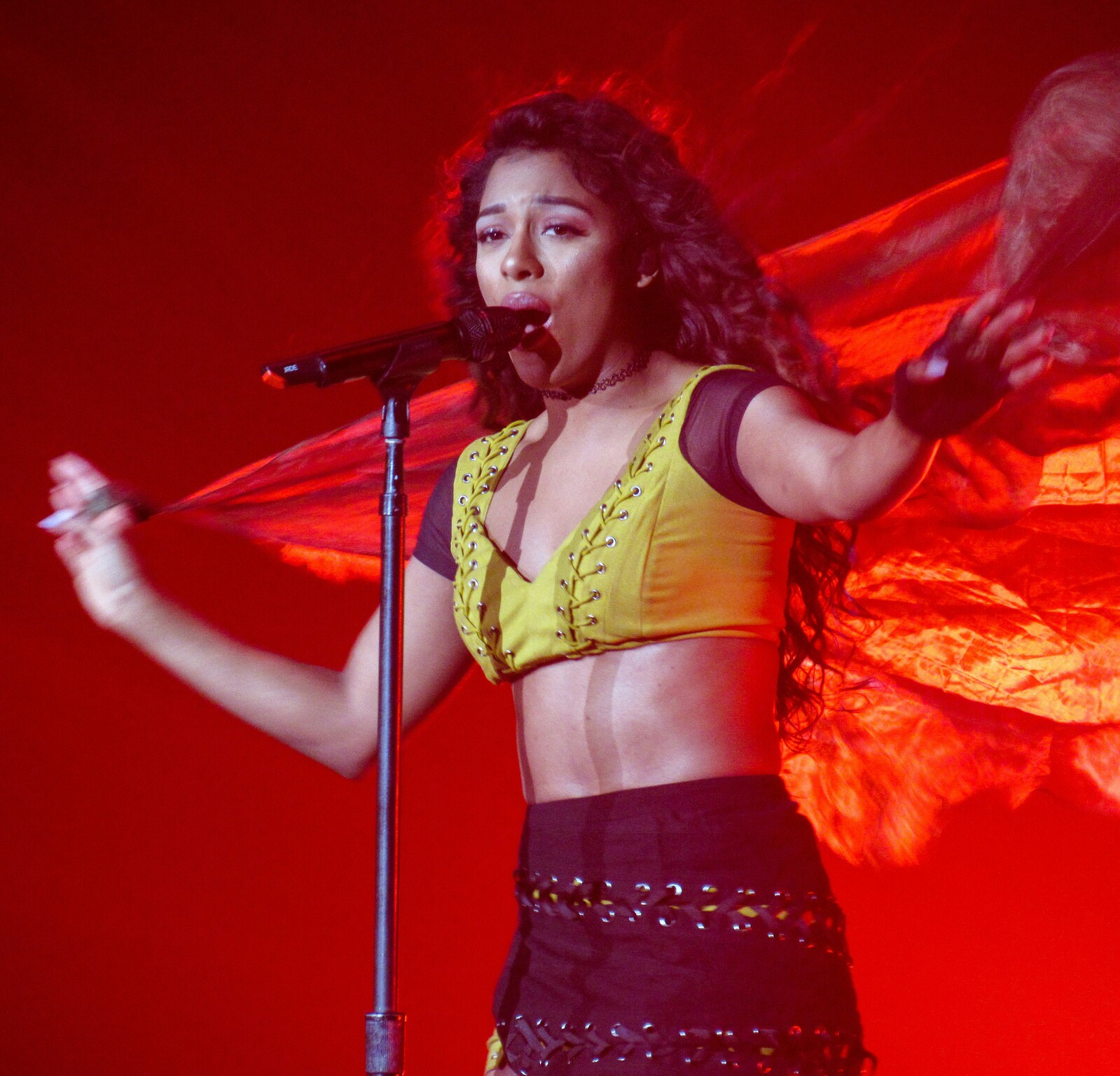
Victoria Monét co-wrote the song.

"Be Alright" was written by Ariana Grande, Tommy Brown, Victoria Monét, Khaled Rohaim, Nicholas Audino, Lewis Hughes, Willie Tafa, Nao and Mura Masa. It was produced by Twice as Nice and Brown. According to the sheet music published at Musicnotes.com by Universal Music Publishing Group, the song is composed in the key of C♯ minor with a tempo of 109 beats per minute. Grande's vocals range from the note of F♯_{3} to G♯_{5}.

"Be Alright" is a song heavily inspired by 1990's deep house, also having Chicago house, R&B, and dance-pop influences. Christopher R. Weingarten of Rolling Stone went further, calling it a "tropical house swagger-jack." Pitchfork's Corban Goble defined it as "a little more downtempo and assured than the whizzing pinball machine of something like "Break Free"." During the song, Grande provides breathy ad-libs. Lyrically, "Be Alright" is a carefree song about being optimistic. During the first lines, she sings: "Midnight shadows / When finding love is a battle / But daylight, is so close / So don't you worry 'bout a thing." Later, she promises: "The hard times are golden 'cause they all lead to better days."

Guernsey born record producer Mura Masa alleged the track ripped off his 2015 single "Firefly" featuring Nao. Consequently, Masa (as "Alexander Crossan") and Nao (as "Neo Joshua"), the track's songwriters, were credited as co-writers of "Be Alright".

== Critical reception ==
Digital Spy's Lewis Corner stated the song is "a right little jam" and "deep house with high notes", being one of the most infectious songs Grande has released thus far. In his review of Dangerous Woman, Corner called it "subtly epic, by not feeling pumped to Ibiza proportions, but transporting you to a more mellowed state of euphoria," also highlighting that it was one of his favorite songs. Sal Cinquemani of Slant Magazine called it a "minimalistic banger" and noted that "the modern technique is cleverly used to approximate a retro sound, simulating the black male background singers of early-'90s house music." Megan Downing of MTV UK wrote that it "shouldn't work on paper: a deep house track featuring Ari's souring vocals, however, it really does work and is one of the best tracks on the album," while Stephen Thomas Erlewine of AllMusic called it an alluring "bright blasts of disco."

Corban Globe of Pitchfork opined that "'Be Alright' utilizes the deep house lite that's en vogue these days, allowing an assured Grande to soar, though she wisely omits some of the garnish vocal runs. The chorus is compact and clever, highlighting [the song's] understated approach. Here, Grande keeps finding ways to make the hot sound of the moment work for her; it's proof she can change speeds." Anna Gaca of Spin commented that the song "sounds equally ready for a post-club chill session or a dance floor remix," while for Luis Polanco of Billboard the song "is perfect for those moments of doubt in a relationship." Mikael Wood of Los Angeles Times called it "buoyant", but observed that she promises the feel-good optimism "in a voice that sounds like it's never seen worse than a broken fingernail." Christopher R. Weingarten from Rolling Stone found the track "flat, monochromatic."

== Live performances ==
Grande performed "Be Alright" for the first time during the 41st season of Saturday Night Live on March 12, 2016. The performance had Grande with her dancers doing a "Vogue-filled" choreography. "Be Alright" was performed during Grande's set on the 2016 Wango Tango and Vevo Sessions. "Be Alright" was also added on the Dangerous Woman Tour as the opening song. Grande opened the One Love Manchester benefit concert on June 4, 2017, with this song. She also performed it at the Concert for Charlottesville benefit concert on September 24, 2017. Grande performed the song at the March for Our Lives rally in Washington, D.C., on March 24, 2018. On June 14, Ariana gave a surprise performance of "Be Alright" at the Songwriters Hall of Fame in New York City.

The song was included in the set list of Grande's 2019 Sweetener World Tour. Seven years later, she performed it a cappella on the Eternal Sunshine Tour.

== Credits and personnel ==
Recording

- Recorded at Vietnom Studios
- Mixed at Mixstar Studios, Virginia Beach, Virginia
- Mastered at Sterling Sound

Personnel

- Ariana Grande – vocals, writing
- Thomas Brown – writing, production, engineer, bass, percussion, programming, keys, drums
- Victoria McCants – writing, background vocals
- Khaled Rohaim – writing, production, bass, percussion, programming, keys
- Nicholas Audino – writing, production, engineer, bass, percussion, programming, keys, drums
- Lewis Hughes – writing, production, bass, percussion, programming, keys
- Willie Tafa – writing
- Serban Ghenea – mixing
- Christopher Truio – engineer
- John Hanes – mixing engineer
- Tom Coyne – audio mastering
- Aya Merrill – audio mastering
- Alexander Crossan - writing
- Neo Joshua - writing

Credits adapted from the liner notes of Dangerous Woman, Republic Records. Crossan and Nao were added later.

== Charts ==
Chart performance for "Be Alright"
Chart (2016)	Peak position
Australia (ARIA)	52
Canada Hot 100 (Billboard)	39
Czech Republic Singles Digital (ČNS IFPI)	86
France (SNEP)	75
Greece Digital Songs (Billboard)	9
Ireland (IRMA)	92
Japan Hot 100 (Billboard)	67
Netherlands (Single Top 100)	89
New Zealand Heatseekers (Recorded Music NZ)	8
Portugal (AFP)	63
Scottish Singles Sales (Official Charts)	42
Slovakia Singles Digital (ČNS IFPI)	81
South Korea International (Circle)	25
Sweden Heatseeker (Sverigetopplistan)	10
UK Singles (Official Charts)	65
US Billboard Hot 100	43

== Certifications ==
Certifications for "Be Alright"
Region	Certification	Certified units/sales
Australia (ARIA)	Platinum	70,000^{‡}
Brazil (Pro-Música Brasil)	Platinum	60,000^{‡}
New Zealand (RMNZ)	Gold	15,000^{‡}
United Kingdom (BPI)	Gold	400,000^{‡}
United States (RIAA)	Platinum	1,000,000^{‡}
^{‡} Sales+streaming figures based on certification alone.
