= Everyday (Ariana Grande song) =

2017 single by Ariana Grande featuring Future

Single by Ariana Grande featuring Future

from the album Dangerous Woman
- Released: January 10, 2017
- Recorded: 2015
- Studio: Calabasas Sound; Wolf Cousins Studios, Stockholm
- Genre: Electropop; R&B; trap
- Length: 3:14
- Label: Republic
- Songwriters: Savan Kotecha; Ilya Salmanzadeh; Ariana Grande; Nayvadius DeMun Wilburn
- Producer: Ilya

Ariana Grande singles chronology
"Faith" (2016)	"Everyday" (2017)	"Beauty and the Beast" (2017)

Future singles chronology
"Used to This" (2016)	"Everyday" (2017)	"Cold" (2017)

Music video
- "Everyday" on YouTube

"Everyday" is a song by American singer-songwriter Ariana Grande featuring American rapper Future. It was released on January 10, 2017, by Republic Records as the fourth and final single from Grande's third studio album Dangerous Woman (2016). The song was written by the artists alongside Savan Kotecha and producer Ilya. "Everyday" was premiered on Beats 1 in May 2016, as part of a countdown a week ahead of the release of the album. On January 10, 2017, the single was serviced to rhythmic contemporary playlists, and sent to contemporary hit radio on February 14, 2017, serving as the fourth and final single from the album.

"Everyday" is a woozy electropop and trap song built around a grinding beat and a thrumming bassline. One of Grande's more lyrically explicit songs, the lyrics speak of sexual satisfaction. The track received mixed reviews from music critics who appreciated its production, but they were neutral towards Future's feature. Commercially, "Everyday" charted in multiple territories, failing to enter the top 30 in any of them.

The song's accompanying music video was released on February 27, 2017, on Vevo, directed by Chris Marrs Piliero. Grande promoted the song with live performances during her second world tour, the Dangerous Woman Tour. The song charted within the top forty in Belgium and the UK R&B Chart, and was later certified Platinum in the United States, Canada, Australia, and Brazil.

== Background and release ==
"Everyday" was written by Savan Kotecha, Ilya, Grande and Future, and produced by Ilya and Max Martin. It was recorded in 2015 at MXM Studios and Wolf Cousins Studios in Stockholm. Regarding the collaboration, Grande said in an interview for KIIS FM: "I knew I wanted to work with Future, but I didn't know if we could find the right song to do together because we're so different, but we found a dope vibe and it's very unique and exciting."

Grande premiered "Everyday" on Beats 1 on May 13, 2016, a week ahead of the release of Dangerous Woman. The singer announced the song as the album's fourth single on January 3, 2017. The single was serviced to rhythmic contemporary playlists in the US on January 10, 2017. A challenge for Grande's fans was announced by the singer on Twitter on January 30, 2017, where they had to unlock the lyric video for "Everyday" by accumulating enough save and stream data for the song on Spotify. In her tweet, Grande provided a link to her website where fans could track the challenge's progress meter. The lyric video was unlocked on Vevo on February 1, 2017. Directed by Chris Marrs Piliero, it features Grande dancing and singing in front of a row of spotlights. Future is absent from the video, though Grande is shown lip syncing his verse. "Everyday" impacted contemporary hit radio in the US on February 14, 2017.

== Composition ==
"Everyday"
A 23-second sample featuring the song's pounding EDM chorus where Future is heard warbling the refrain while Grande harmonizes around him.

"Everyday" is a woozy electropop, R&B, and trap song. The music is built around a grinding, tinned dance beat and a thrumming side-chained groovy bassline. Other instruments include keys, percussion and guitars. The song opens with Grande singing, "Anytime I'm alone, I can't help thinking about you," accompanied by an R&B-pop production comprising swirling synths. A hollowed-out bridge sung by Grande features before each chorus. The pounding EDM chorus is elevated by Future warbling the song's hook in a warped, woozy style while Grande harmonizes around him. As opposed to using her higher vocal register, Grande instead sings in a content signing style.

The song's lyrics are explicit and a paean to the ecstasy of sex. Grande illustrates a steamy love affair and lathers on flirtation. During his verse, Future raps about lavish vacations and late-night endeavors, describing himself as a bad guy ideally suited to Grande's needs.

== Critical reception ==
In a positive response, Joey Nolfi of Entertainment Weekly deemed the track a "rhythmic banger" and appreciated Grande's "smoldering vocals". Michael Cragg of The Observer found the song pulsating. Jenna Romaine of Billboard magazine said it was a "fun, bopping song", while Taylor Weatherby from the same publication viewed it among Grande's strong collaborations, noting that it had "greatness". AllMusic's Stephen Thomas Erlewine described "Everyday" as "a heavy thrumming jam". Annie Zaleski of The A.V. Club called the track "a trap-pop gem" and an example of Grande sounding "far more confident tackling Dangerous Woman's diffuse genres." Brennan Carley from Spin magazine complimented the song's "neatly-measured hook". Complex magazine writer Chris Mench said, "With Grande going for a more mature sound on this album, 'Everyday' actually seems to fit the aesthetic pretty well. It's dance beat and explicit lyrics seem ready to grab the attention of old fans as well as make an impact on the radio."

In a less enthusiastic review, Nathan Wisnicki from Pretty Much Amazing was critical of Grande's "lack of interesting inflection", but felt Future's feature saved an otherwise "pretty generic song". Quinn Moreland from Pitchfork Media dismissed Future's repetition of the song's hook, and also said that without the rapper's verse "it would be immediately obvious that 'Everyday' is constructed atop a pile of hot fluff." In a review of Dangerous Woman, Ross Scarano of Complex said "Everyday" and "Greedy" failed to match "the consistent highs" of Grande's 2014 album My Everything. Chris Kelly of Fact magazine wrote that the song wasted Future's feature. Rolling Stone's Christopher R. Weingarten derided the track as "something where Future sings a chorus that is one word", and cited it as an example of Grande being "prone to a schizophrenic sound and unfortunate sequencing". Theon Weber of Spin regarded the track as a "rote 2016 obligation" and "executive-mandated bagginess". Sputnikmusic viewed "Everyday" as "a real travesty", writing that "in addition to possessing awful lyrics, it is also simple to a fault."

== Commercial performance ==
After the release of Dangerous Woman, "Everyday" debuted at number 23 on the US Bubbling Under Hot 100 chart for the week dated June 11, 2016, due to digital downloads from the parent album. Following the release of its music video, "Everyday" debuted at number 85 on the US Billboard Hot 100 issue dated March 4, 2017, moving up to number 78 the following week. After five weeks on the chart, the song peaked at number 55 on the week dated April 1, 2017; it is her second-lowest-peaking single on the chart, behind "Right There" in 2013. The song had a similar ten-week run on the Canadian equivalent of the Hot 100, with a peak position of 54. The song fared better on the airplay charts, where it peaked at numbers 18 and 13 on the Billboard Mainstream Top 40 and Rhythmic charts, respectively.

== Music video ==
A challenge for Grande's fans was announced by the singer on Twitter on January 30, 2017, where they had to unlock the lyric video for "Everyday" by accumulating enough save and stream data for the song on Spotify. The lyric video for "Everyday" was unlocked on Grande's Vevo channel on February 1, 2017. It features Grande dancing and singing in front of a row of spotlights, while wearing a black bra, an oversized Karl Kani down jacket, and her hair in a half up-down style with two small space buns. Future is absent from the lyric video, and Grande is seen lip syncing his verse. The official music video was then released on February 27, 2017, also directed by Chris Marrs Piliero, who had previously directed the music videos for "Break Free" and "Santa Tell Me".

== Live performances ==
Grande first performed "Everyday" as part of her album showcase for Vevo in New York on May 21, 2016. It was included on the setlist for Grande's 2017 Dangerous Woman Tour. "Everyday" was also performed at the iHeartRadio Festival 2016.

== Credits and personnel ==
Credits adapted from Dangerous Woman's liner notes.

Recording and management

- Recorded at MXM Studios and Wolf Cousins Studios (Stockholm, Sweden)
- Mixed at MixStar Studios (Virginia Beach, Virginia)
- Mastered at Sterling Sound (New York City, New York)
- Published by MXM, administered by Kobalt – (ASCAP), Wolf Cousins (STIM), Warner/Chappell Music Scand. (STIM) and Grandefinale

Personnel

- Ariana Grande – vocals, backing vocals, songwriting
- Future – featured vocals, backing vocals, songwriting
- Ilya – production, songwriting, vocal production, programming, Keyboard, bass, percussion, backing vocals
- Savan Kotecha – songwriting, backing vocals
- Max Martin – vocal production
- Serban Ghenea – mixing
- Sam Holland – engineer
- John Hanes – mixing engineer
- Tom Coyne – mastering
- Aya Merrill – mastering
- Jeremy Lertola – guitars

== Charts ==
Chart performance for "Everyday"
Chart (2016–2017)	Peak position
Australia (ARIA)	96
Belgium (Ultratip Bubbling Under Flanders)	6
Belgium (Ultratop 50 Wallonia)	38
Canada Hot 100 (Billboard)	54
Czech Republic Singles Digital (ČNS IFPI)	70
Finland Airplay (Radiosoittolista)	63
Ireland (IRMA)	88
New Zealand Heatseekers (RMNZ)	3
Portugal (AFP)	74
Scottish Singles Sales (Official Charts)	72
Slovakia Singles Digital (ČNS IFPI)	65
UK Singles (Official Charts)	123
UK Hip Hop/R&B (Official Charts)	36
US Billboard Hot 100	55
US Pop Airplay (Billboard)	18
US Rhythmic Airplay (Billboard)	13

== Certifications ==
Certifications for "Everyday"
Region	Certification	Certified units/sales
Australia (ARIA)	Platinum	70,000^{‡}
Brazil (Pro-Música Brasil)	3× Platinum	180,000^{‡}
Canada (Music Canada)	2× Platinum	160,000^{‡}
Denmark (IFPI Danmark)	Gold	45,000^{‡}
New Zealand (RMNZ)	Platinum	30,000^{‡}
Poland (ZPAV)	Gold	25,000^{‡}
United Kingdom (BPI)	Gold	400,000^{‡}
United States (RIAA)	2× Platinum	2,000,000^{‡}
^{‡} Sales+streaming figures based on certification alone.

== Release history ==
Release history and formats for "Everyday"
Country	Date	Format	Label	Ref.
United States	January 10, 2017	Rhythmic contemporary	Republic	
United States	February 14, 2017	Contemporary hit radio	Republic	
Italy	June 9, 2017	Contemporary hit radio	Universal	
