= Into You (Ariana Grande song) =

2016 single by Ariana Grande

Single by Ariana Grande

from the album Dangerous Woman
- Released: May 6, 2016
- Recorded: 2015
- Studio: MXM (Stockholm, Sweden); Wolf Cousins (Stockholm, Sweden)
- Genre: EDM; house; dance-pop; electro
- Length: 4:04
- Label: Republic
- Songwriters: Max Martin; Savan Kotecha; Alexander Kronlund; Ilya Salmanzadeh; Ariana Grande
- Producers: Max Martin; Ilya

Ariana Grande singles chronology
"Dangerous Woman" (2016)	"Into You" (2016)	"Side to Side" (2016)

Music video
- "Into You" on YouTube

"Into You" is a song by American singer-songwriter Ariana Grande. It was released by Republic Records as the second single from her third studio album Dangerous Woman (2016). Grande co-wrote the song with Savan Kotecha, Alexander Kronlund, and its producers Max Martin and Ilya. The song was made available for digital download on May 6, 2016, and was later serviced to US contemporary hit and rhythmic radio stations on June 28. It is an EDM, house, dance-pop, and electro song that features a club beat, synths, and sharp clicks. The song is about Grande's desire for her partner to show more affection in their relationship.

The song peaked at number one in Argentina, number nine on the New Zealand Singles Chart, number 11 on the ARIA Singles Chart, number 13 on the US Billboard Hot 100, and number 14 on the UK Singles Chart. The song also attained top-10 peaks in Guatemala and Greece, as well as reaching the top-twenty in Australia, Canada, the Czech Republic, Hungary, Iceland, Ireland, Latvia, the Netherlands, Scotland, Slovakia, the United Kingdom, and the United States. It has been certified platinum or higher in 14 countries, including octuple platinum in Canada, septuple platinum in Australia and the US, and quadruple platinum in the UK. The song has over 2.1 billion streams on Spotify.

"Into You" has been deemed Grande's best song by multiple publications, receiving widespread critical acclaim for its production, lyrics and Grande's vocals. The accompanying music video was directed by Hannah Lux Davis and released on May 24, 2016. The video sees Grande and guest star Don Benjamin having a secret love affair. It spawned four nominations at the 2016 MTV Video Music Awards, including Best Female Video. Grande promoted the song with televised performances at the 2016 Billboard Music Awards, the season 10 finale of The Voice, and the 2016 Summertime Ball.

== Background and composition ==
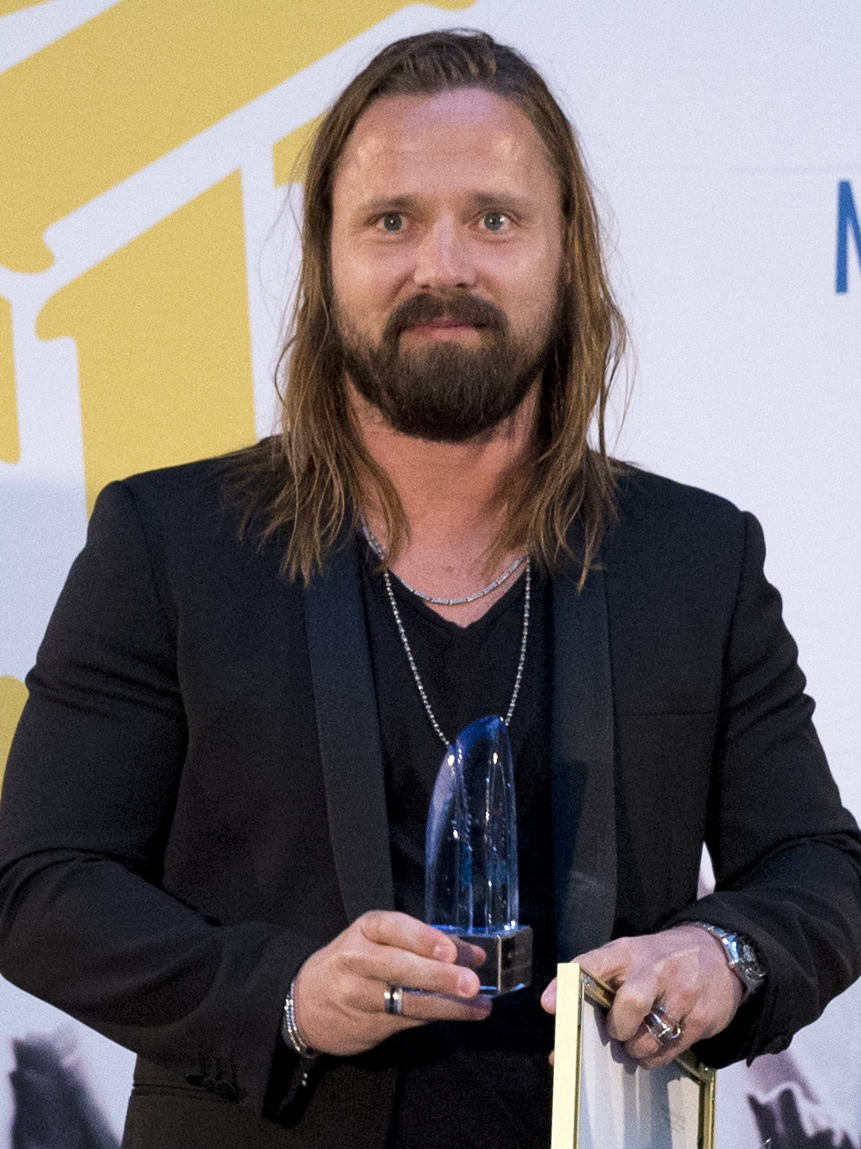
Max Martin contributed both writing and production to the song.

"Into You" was written by Max Martin, Savan Kotecha, Alexander Kronlund, Ilya, and Grande, with production, programming, keys, guitar, bass, percussion, and background vocals handled by Martin and Ilya; Kotecha also provided backing vocals. Grande had previously worked with Martin, Kotecha, and Ilya on her second studio album My Everything (2014). Musically, "Into You" is a dance-pop, house, electro and EDM song featuring "a thudding club beat, lurking synths and sharp clicks". According to the sheet music published at Musicnotes.com by Universal Music Publishing Group, the song is written in the key of F♯ minor in common time with a tempo of 108 beats per minute. Grande's vocals span two octaves, five notes, and one semitone, from F♯_{3} to E_{6}. "Into You" starts with "a minimal club beat", before "crescendoing into [a] thumping chorus", where "an uptempo disco backline explodes into a monstrous club-ready hook", as noted by Complex's Jessie Morris. Jessica Goodman of Entertainment Weekly added that the song also has "new-age disco beats". uDiscoverMusic's Da'Shan Smith mentioned that "Grande's breathy falsetto float[s] over the thick beats" of the song.

Lyrically, the song has Grande singing of "waiting for her love interest to stop the conversation and finally make a move". Digital Spy editor Lewis Corner noted the possible references to Elvis Presley's "A Little Less Conversation" (1968) and Mariah Carey's "Touch My Body" (2008) that are made in the chorus, where both phrases appear together. Slant Magazine's Sal Cinquemani felt that the song's refrain is similar to the refrain of Jessie J's "Burnin' Up" (2014).

== Release and reception ==
"Into You" was released as a digital download on May 6, 2016, upon pre-order of the album, and was later serviced to radio on June 28, serving as the album's second single.

The song was met with widespread critical acclaim. Jamieson Cox of The Verge stated that the track "might be the catchiest song cut from the album to date", adding: "You can thank — or blame — pop god Max Martin and his cabal of songwriters for those razor-sharp disco synths." Morris praised the overall production of the song, noting that "Grande travels down a rabbit hole of slinky vocals that simmers in some deep, throbbing production", and called it "irresistible". At Digital Spy, Lewis Corner called the song a "massive banger", saying that it has "a solid earworm hook that is sure to dominate radio in the coming months". Goodman also praised the "monstrous" hook and the chorus "that hears Grande hit high notes". Writing for Rolling Stone, Sarah Grant said the song "is primed for dance floor makeout sessions" and that "Grande swaggers with little affect in tight vocal range".

NME's Larry Bartleet called "Into You" a "[c]lub anthem-to-be", while Sal Cinquemani from Slant Magazine named it a standout on Dangerous Woman. Quinn Moreland of Pitchfork went on to call it potentially Grande's best single since "Love Me Harder" (2014). MTV News' Sasha Geffen observed that the track "brings more heat than anything we've heard from Dangerous Woman so far, proving [Grande] hasn't lost her touch for electric dance floor jams". Writing for Billboard, Lisa Brown praised the "infectious distorted beats", declaring that "she still stays true to her sensual 'dangerous woman' inspiration". Hayden Wright from Radio.com analyzed that the song "combines pulsating electro beats with Grande's iridescent vocals, a tried-and-true recipe for her biggest hits". The Arizona Republic's Ed Masley said the song "hinges on a steamy, disco-flavored chorus that makes the most of Grande's sultry vocal presence", going on to note that Grande "gets a chance to re-assert her claim to the title of the new Mariah Carey while making the dancefloor feel the heat". Annie Zaleski, writing for The A.V. Club, called it a "sultry" track, "whose sassy finger-snaps and inky production give way to the record's best come-on". Theon Weber of Spin complimented the song's chorus and lyrical content of its verses, declaring that it "redeems the floor-filling thud with a demand for 'a little less conversation and a little more touch my body'".

Billboard ranked "Into You" at number six on their 100 Best Pop Songs of 2016 list: "Dangerous Woman is rife with provocative lyrics, but the album's second single feels like the sexiest track of them all", due to its "seductive" bass and Grande's "alluring vocals." Pitchfork would later list the song on their ranking of the 100 best songs of 2016 at number 82. In The Village Voice's annual Pazz & Jop mass critics poll of the year's best in music in 2016, "Into You" was ranked at number 21. In 2018, Richard S. He of Billboard ranked the song as the best in Grande's catalog. The Guardian and Rolling Stone also ranked it as Grande's best song.

== Commercial performance ==
"Into You" entered the US Billboard Hot 100 at number 83 on May 28, 2016, but exited the Hot 100 the following week. It re-entered the Hot 100 and rebounded to number 51 on the week dated June 11, 2016, before moving up to number 48 the following week. "Into You" initially failed to reach the top-40 for several weeks, until it climbed from number 41 to number 33 on the Hot 100 issue dated July 30, 2016. The song moved from number 33 to number 24 the week after. In its thirteenth week on the chart, dated August 27, 2016, the song further climbed nine places from number 22 to its peak of number 13, holding that position for two weeks. Consequently, this stood as her second top-20 single from Dangerous Woman. As of June 2020, the song has sold 792,000 copies in the United States, where it has been certified quadruple platinum by the Recording Industry Association of America (RIAA).

In the United Kingdom, the song initially debuted on the UK Singles Chart at number 44, but later went on to peak at number 14, making it Grande's sixth UK top-20 single. In Australia, the song debuted at number 46, before climbing to number 19. It eventually peaked at number 11, remaining at this position for three non-consecutive weeks. In New Zealand, "Into You" reached the top ten, peaking at number nine in its seventh week. The song became Grande's fourth top-ten single and first since "Bang Bang" (2014). The song also peaked within the top 20 in Argentina, Belgium, Canada, the Czech Republic, Greece, Guatemala, Hungary, Iceland, Ireland, Latvia, the Netherlands, Scotland, and Slovakia.

== Music video ==
Directed by Hannah Lux Davis, the song's music video made its premiere at midnight May 24, 2016, on Vevo. Hours before its release, Grande teased the video with photos from the shoot via Twitter. The music video begins with the title "Into You" on the screen, with a desert background. Several shots of Grande are shown in the desert, while others show her riding on the back of a motorcycle with the guest star Don Benjamin. The video continues with them together, and they go on to enter a motel titled "Honeymoon Inn". Various shots show the two hanging out and being playful inside and outside the motel. The video switches to Grande being in a party filled with other people and a man who may represent one of her ex-boyfriends or her husband. At the party, Grande is interested in other things, but the man pulls her arm, and she unwillingly smiles at the cameras. Grande and Benjamin, who is apparently one of the man's bodyguards, make eye contact while Grande sees the man kiss and hug other women. Grande then gets up and leaves, with Benjamin following behind her. The two stay together after the party, and the video concludes with Grande and Benjamin riding on a motorcycle, as is shown in the beginning.

The music video spawned four nominations at the 2016 MTV Video Music Awards in the categories for Best Female Video, Best Pop Video, Best Editing, and Best Cinematography. On YouTube, the music video reached one billion views on July 17, 2023.

== Live performances ==
Grande delivered her first performance of the song at the 2016 Billboard Music Awards, as a medley with "Dangerous Woman". The performance included backup dancers and pink smoke, and was listed as one of the best of the night by editors from Billboard, Rolling Stone, and Time. Grande also performed "Into You" on the season 10 finale of The Voice in 2016, as well as at that year's Capital Summertime Ball. Grande released a lyric video for "Into You" on August 3, 2016, which features her singing a capella.

== In popular culture ==
"Into You" is featured in the 2016 dance video game Just Dance 2017. Grande released a remix of the song by Alex Ghenea that features American rapper Mac Miller on August 6, 2016, exclusively on SoundCloud but later made it available for digital download. The two had previously collaborated on Grande's 2013 single "The Way". Another remix was released to digital retailers by 3lau shortly afterwards. The song is considered a gay anthem, being used in a lip-sync on RuPaul's Drag Race All Stars season 4 between Valentina and Monét X Change in which Valentina won and eliminated Farrah Moan. On February 26, 2026, Slovak singer Adéla covered "Into You" for Spotify Singles.

== Track listing ==
Digital download and streaming – Alex Ghenea remix

1. Into You (featuring Mac Miller, Alex Ghenea remix) – 3:38

Digital download and streaming – 3lau remix

1. Into You (3lau remix) – 3:17

== Credits and personnel ==
Credits adapted from Dangerous Woman's liner notes.

Recording and management

- Recorded at MXM Studios and Wolf Cousins Studios (Stockholm, Sweden)
- Mixed at MixStar Studios (Virginia Beach, Virginia)
- Mastered at Sterling Sound (New York City)
- Published by MXM – administered by Kobalt — (ASCAP), Wolf Cousins (STIM), Warner/Chappell Music Scand. (STIM) and Grandefinale LLC.

Personnel

- Ariana Grande – lead vocals, songwriting
- Max Martin – songwriting, production, programming, keys, guitar, bass, percussion, background vocals
- Savan Kotecha – songwriting, background vocals
- Ilya Salmanzadeh – songwriting, production, programming, keys, guitar, bass, percussion, background vocals
- Alexander Kronlund – songwriting
- Serban Ghenea – mixing
- Peter Karlsson – vocal editing
- Sam Holland – engineering
- John Hanes – mixing engineering
- Tom Coyne – mastering
- Aya Merrill – mastering
- Wendy Goldstein – A&R
- Scooter Braun – A&R

== Charts ==
=== Weekly charts ===
2016 weekly chart performance for "Into You"
Chart (2016)	Peak position
Argentina (Monitor Latino)	1
Australia (ARIA)	11
Austria (Ö3 Austria Top 40)	46
Belgium (Ultratop 50 Flanders)	29
Belgium (Ultratip Bubbling Under Wallonia)	7
Canada Hot 100 (Billboard)	13
Canada AC (Billboard)	22
Canada CHR/Top 40 (Billboard)	10
Canada Hot AC (Billboard)	12
Czech Republic Singles Digital (ČNS IFPI)	18
Denmark (Tracklisten)	30
Euro Digital Songs (Billboard)	20
Finnish Airplay (Radiosoittolista)	53
Finland Download (Latauslista)	21
France (SNEP)	64
Germany (GfK)	49
Greece Digital Songs (Billboard)	4
Guatemala (Monitor Latino)	10
Hungary (Single Top 40)	17
Hungary (Stream Top 40)	17
Iceland (RÚV)	15
Ireland (IRMA)	12
Italy (FIMI)	29
Japan Hot 100 (Billboard)	25
Latvia (Latvijas Top 40)	20
Netherlands (Dutch Top 40)	13
Netherlands (Single Top 100)	21
New Zealand (Recorded Music NZ)	9
Norway (VG-lista)	25
Portugal (AFP)	22
Scottish Singles Sales (Official Charts)	11
Slovakia Singles Digital (ČNS IFPI)	13
South Korea International Chart (Gaon)	58
Spain (Promusicae)	55
Sweden (Sverigetopplistan)	31
Switzerland (Schweizer Hitparade)	34
UK Singles (Official Charts)	14
US Billboard Hot 100	13
US Adult Pop Airplay (Billboard)	20
US Dance Airplay (Billboard)	9
US Dance Club Songs (Billboard)	8
US Pop Airplay (Billboard)	7
US Rhythmic Airplay (Billboard)	14

2026 weekly chart performance for "Into You"
Chart (2026)	Peak position
Global 200 (Billboard)	114
Greece International (IFPI)	61

=== Year-end charts ===
Year-end chart performance for "Into You"
Chart (2016)	Position
Argentina (Monitor Latino)	16
Australia (ARIA)	49
Belgium (Ultratop Flanders)	94
Canada (Canadian Hot 100)	30
Denmark (Tracklisten)	97
Italy (FIMI)	78
Netherlands (Dutch Top 40)	78
Netherlands (Single Top 100)	68
Sweden (Sverigetopplistan)	96
Switzerland (Schweizer Hitparade)	88
UK Singles (Official Charts Company)	46
US Billboard Hot 100	51
US Dance/Mix Show Airplay (Billboard)	48
US Mainstream Top 40 (Billboard)	35

== Certifications ==
Certifications for "Into You"
Region	Certification	Certified units/sales
Australia (ARIA)	7× Platinum	490,000^{‡}
Austria (IFPI Austria)	Platinum	30,000^{‡}
Brazil (Pro-Música Brasil)	2× Diamond	500,000^{‡}
Belgium (BRMA)	Gold	10,000^{‡}
Canada (Music Canada)	8× Platinum	640,000^{‡}
Denmark (IFPI Danmark)	2× Platinum	180,000^{‡}
France (SNEP)	Gold	66,666^{‡}
Germany (BVMI)	Platinum	400,000^{‡}
Hungary (MAHASZ)	Gold	1,500^{‡}
Italy (FIMI)	2× Platinum	100,000^{‡}
New Zealand (RMNZ)	5× Platinum	150,000^{‡}
Norway (IFPI Norway)	2× Platinum	120,000^{‡}
Poland (ZPAV)	4× Platinum	200,000^{‡}
Portugal (AFP)	Platinum	10,000^{‡}
Spain (Promusicae)	Platinum	60,000^{‡}
Switzerland (IFPI Switzerland)	Gold	15,000^{‡}
United Kingdom (BPI)	4× Platinum	2,400,000^{‡}
United States (RIAA)	7× Platinum	7,000,000^{‡}
Streaming
Greece (IFPI Greece)	2× Platinum	4,000,000^{†}
Japan (RIAJ)	Gold	50,000,000^{†}
Sweden (GLF)	3× Platinum	24,000,000^{†}
^{‡} Sales+streaming figures based on certification alone.^{†} Streaming-only figures based on certification alone.

== Release history ==
Release dates and formats for "Into You"
Region	Date	Format(s)	Version	Label	Ref.
Various	May 6, 2016	Digital download; streaming	Original	Republic	
United States	June 28, 2016	Contemporary hit radio; rhythmic contemporary radio	Original	Republic	
Italy	July 1, 2016	Radio airplay	Original	Universal	
United States	August 8, 2016	Hot adult contemporary radio	Original	Republic	
Various	August 19, 2016	Digital download; streaming	Alex Ghenea remix	Republic	
Various	August 19, 2016	Digital download; streaming	3lau remix	Republic	
