= Rickard Göransson =

Swiedish musician (born 1983)

- Born: Rickard Bertil Göransson; 22 October 1983 (age 42)
- Origin: Växjö, Sweden
- Genres: Pop, rock, dance-pop, alternative
- Instruments: Guitar, piano, vocals, bass, drums
- Years active: 2007 – present

Rickard Bertil Göransson is a Swedish songwriter, producer, and musician. He was the lead guitarist for American alternative rock band Carolina Liar. He has written and produced for artists including Ariana Grande, Jessie J, Nicki Minaj, Avril Lavigne, Ellie Goulding, Enrique Iglesias, Nick Jonas, Charlie Puth, and Selena Gomez.

Göransson's songwriting credits include eight-times-platinum "Bang Bang", two-times-platinum "God Is a Woman", and "Husavik" (from the 2020 film Eurovision Song Contest: The Story of Fire Saga), which won the Society of Composers and Lyricists' Outstanding Original Song for Visual Media in 2021.

== Personal life ==
Born and raised in Växjö, Sweden, he attended the Stockholm Conservatory of Music. He is based in Los Angeles, California.

== Career ==
=== Carolina Liar ===
Rickard joined the band Carolina Liar in 2007. The band is best known for the songs "I'm Not Over" and Show Me What I'm Looking For from their 2008 major-label debut album, Coming to Terms, produced by Swedish producers Max Martin and Tobias Karlsson. The band was the supporting act on the David Cook/Gavin Degraw 2011 Fall Tour. In 2012, they were the opening act for the Kelly Clarkson/The Fray Tour. They also played as the opening act for Rob Thomas on his Thomas Cradlesong Tour in 2009–2010.

=== Songwriting and producing ===
In 2014 Rickard gained prominence with the release of the hit "Bang Bang" (Ariana Grande, Jessie J, and Nicki Minaj), which he co-wrote and co-produced. The song peaked at number 3 on the US Billboard Hot 100, debuted at number 1 in the UK, and has amassed 1.6 billion YouTube streams and nearly 900 million Spotify plays.

Rickard is signed to MXM Music Publishing and continues to write and produce for various artists. During 2015-2017 he produced and wrote the leadoff track on Flo Rida's EP My House (EP)), co-wrote Ellie Goulding's track Still Falling for You from the soundtrack to the film Bridget Jones's Baby, co-wrote "Bills" by LunchMoney Lewis, and co-wrote and co-produced Nobody Love, Tori Kelly's first entry on the US Billboard Hot 100. His co-writes included Nick Jonas's "Under You" and Tove Lo's "Don't Talk About It." In 2018 he co-wrote and co-produced "Empty Cups" from Charlie Puth's Voicenotes album. His biggest hit of this period was his co-write of Ariana Grande's double-platinum "God Is a Woman" in 2018.

Further major success came in 2020 with his co-write and co-production of "Husavik" for the 2020 film Eurovision Song Contest: The Story of Fire Saga. The song won the Outstanding Original Song for Visual Media award from the Society of Composers and Lyricists, received a nomination for the Best Song at the 26th Critics' Choice Awards, and was included in the February 2021 shortlist for the Academy Award for Best Original Song at the 93rd Academy Awards. The song reached #6 on the British iTunes chart and #9 in the US.

=== Awards and nominations ===
- "God Is a Woman", Winner, ASCAP POP Music Award for Most Performed Songs in 2018 (2019)
- "Bang Bang", Winner, ASCAP POP Music Award for Most Performed Songs in 2014 (2015)
- "Husavik (My Hometown)"
  - Winner, Society of Composers and Lyricists, Outstanding Original Song for Visual Media, 2020 (2021)
  - Winner, New Mexico Film Critics Award, Best Original Song, 2020 (2021)
  - Winner, Hollywood Critics Association, Best Original Song, 2020 (2021)
  - Nominee, Academy Award for Best Original Song, 2020 (2021)
  - Nominee, Critics Choice Awards for Best Original Song, 2020 (2021)
  - Nominee, Music City Film Critics' Association Awards, Best Song, 2020 (2021)
  - Nominee, International Online Cinema Awards (INOCA), Best Original Song, 2020 (2021)
  - Nominee, Hollywood Music In Media Awards (HMMA), Best Original Song – Feature Film, 2020 (2021)
  - Nominee, Chicago Indie Critics Awards (CIC), Best Original Song, 2020 (2021)

=== Discography ===
Year	Artist	Title	Album	Label	Role
2020	Will Ferrell, My Marianne	"Husavik (My Hometown)"	Eurovision Song Contest: The Story of Fire Saga	Arista Records	Producer, writer
2020	Joji	"Upgrade"	Nectar	88rising	Writer
2020	Jeremy Zucker	"Not Ur Friend"	love is not dying	Republic Records	Writer
2018	Ariana Grande	"God Is a Woman"	Sweetener	Republic Records	Writer
2018	Charlie Puth	"Empty Cups"	Voicenotes	Artist Partner Group	Producer, writer
2018	Marc E. Bassy	"Love Her Too (feat. G-Eazy)"	Postmodern Depression (EP)	Republic Records	Writer
2017	Ellie Goulding	"Still Falling For You"	Bridget Jones's Baby Original Motion Picture Soundtrack	Universal Music Group	Writer
2017	Astrid S	"Breathe"	Party's Over	Island Records	Writer
2016	Nick Jonas	"Under You"	Last Year Was Complicated	Island Records	Writer
2016	DNCE	"Pay My Rent"	DNCE	Republic Records	Writer
2016	Tove Lo	"Don't Talk About It"	Lady Wood	Island Records	Writer
2015	Flo Rida	"Once in a Lifetime"	My House	Atlantic	Producer
2015	Tori Kelly	"Nobody Love"	Unbreakable Smile	Capitol Records	Writer, producer
2015	Tori Kelly	"California Lovers (feat. LL Cool J)"	Unbreakable Smile	Capitol Records	Writer, producer
2015	LunchMoney Lewis	"Bills"	Bills (EP)	Kemosabe, Columbia	Writer
2015	DNCE	"Toothbrush"	DNCE	Republic Records	Writer
2015	DNCE	"DNCE"	DNCE	Republic Records	Writer
2015	Zara Larsson	"Rooftop"	1	TEN, Epic, Sony	Writer
2015	Natalie La Rose feat. Fetty Wap	"Around the World"	Around the World	Republic Records	Writer
2014	Ariana Grande, Jessie J, Nicki Minaj	"Bang Bang"	My Everything, Sweet Talker	Republic Records, Lava	Writer, producer
2014	Enrique Iglesias	"There Goes My Baby"	Sex and Love	Republic Records	Writer, producer
2014	Jessie J	"Burnin' Up"	Sweet Talker	Republic Records	Writer
2014	Zara Larsson	"Skippin a Beat"	1	TEN, Epic, Sony	Writer
2013	Avril Lavigne	"Rock N Roll"	Avril Lavigne	Epic	Writer, producer
2013	Fifth Harmony	"Better Together"	Better Together (EP)	Epic	Writer, producer
2013	Fifth Harmony	"Better Together (Acoustic)"	Better Together (EP)	Epic	Writer, producer
2013	Emblem3	"Just for One Day"	Nothing to Lose	Columbia Records	Writer
2013	Selena Gomez	"I Like It That Way"	Stars Dance Deluxe Edition	Hollywood Records	Writer
2012	Avril Lavigne	"What the Hell (Acoustic)"	Goodbye Lullaby (Expanded Edition)	Epic	Producer
2011	Carolina Liar	"All That Comes Out of My Mouth"	Wild Blessed Freedom	Maratone	Writer
