= My Everything (Ariana Grande album) =

2014 studio album by Ariana Grande

- Standard artwork (Note: The deluxe edition features the same artwork as the standard release, but with a darker background, while tenth anniversary edition with a purple background.)

Studio album by Ariana Grande
- Released: August 22, 2014
- Recorded: October 2013 – May 2014
- Studios: Glenwood Palace (Burbank, California); Chalice, Conway, Larrabee North, London Bridge, Record Plant, Vietom, Wake Up Work (Los Angeles); Hollywood, Zedd1 (Santa Monica, California); Patriot (Denver, Colorado); Studio at the Palms (Las Vegas, Nevada); Matzah Ball, Doe (New York City); Wolf Cousins, Kinglet, P.S (Stockholm, Sweden); Metropolis (London, UK)
- Genres: Pop; R&B; electropop
- Length: 40:34
- Label: Republic
- Producers: Max Martin; Shellback; Benny Blanco; Ryan Tedder; Tommy (TBHits) Brown; Rodney "Darkchild" Jerkins; Ilya; Zedd; Key Wane; @PopWansel; @Oakwud; Carl Falk; Rami; Cashmere Cat; Ali Payami; Peter Svensson; Johan Carlsson; Paul "Hot Sauce" Dawson; Rickard Göransson; Travis Sayles; Harmony Samuels

Ariana Grande chronology
Christmas Kisses (2013)	My Everything (2014)	Christmas & Chill (2015)

Singles from My Everything
- 1. "Problem" Released: April 28, 2014; 2. "Break Free" Released: July 2, 2014; 3. "Bang Bang" Released: July 28, 2014; 4. "Love Me Harder" Released: September 30, 2014; 5. "One Last Time" Released: February 10, 2015

My Everything is the second studio album by American singer-songwriter Ariana Grande. It was released on August 22, 2014, through Republic Records. Grande worked with a host of producers and co-writers on the album, including Max Martin, Shellback, Benny Blanco, Ryan Tedder, Darkchild, Ilya Salmanzadeh, Zedd, and David Guetta.

Grande sought for My Everything to sound as "an evolution" from her debut album Yours Truly (2013), exploring more mature and diverse lyrical content and musical styles. Primarily a pop, R&B and electropop record, it expands on the 1990s retro-R&B and hip hop style of its predecessor, while also approaching new genres such as EDM, and dance-pop. Iggy Azalea, Zedd, Big Sean, Cashmere Cat, Childish Gambino, the Weeknd, and ASAP Ferg make guest appearances on My Everything, while Jessie J and Nicki Minaj appear on the deluxe edition.

My Everything charted at number one in Australia, Belgium, Canada, Norway, and the United States while reaching the top five in Austria, Denmark, Germany, Greece, Ireland, Italy, Japan, the Netherlands, New Zealand, Scotland, Spain, Sweden, Switzerland, and the United Kingdom. The album also received multi-platinum certifications in Canada, Denmark, Mexico, New Zealand, Norway, Switzerland, the United Kingdom, and the United States. It received generally favorable reviews from music critics, appearing in year-end best-music lists of 2014. At the 57th Annual Grammy Awards in 2015, My Everything was nominated for Best Pop Vocal Album.

My Everything was supported by four singles, all of which reached global success. The lead single, "Problem", broke numerous digital sales records upon release, and peaked at number two on the US Billboard Hot 100. The second single, "Break Free", reached number four in the United States. The third and fourth singles, "Love Me Harder" and "One Last Time", peaked at numbers seven and thirteen, respectively, with the latter reaching number two in the United Kingdom. The deluxe version also features the single "Bang Bang", which reached a peak position of three. Aided by My Everything's singles, Grande attained the most top ten hits for any artist in 2014 on the Hot 100. To further support the album, Grande embarked on the Honeymoon Tour in 2015.

== Background and recording ==
It's an album that I want to do a little bit different. I don't want it to sound like an extension of Yours Truly. I want it to sound like an evolution. I want to explore more sounds and experiment a little bit. I have a bunch of ideas I'm very excited about and a lot of stuff cooking.

— Grande, on the album

Grande's debut studio album, Yours Truly, was released on August 30, 2013, and was met with critical acclaim. Later that month, she began writing and working on her second studio album and had already completed two songs. Recording sessions began in October with Grande working with previous producers from her debut album Harmony Samuels and Tommy Brown. In January 2014, Grande confirmed she had been working with new producers Ryan Tedder, Savan Kotecha, Benny Blanco, Key Wane and Max Martin. Grande stated in late February that she wanted to name her album after a song she had finished that weekend that is very honest and makes her cry.

In March, it was announced that Grande would be featured on the fifth single from Chris Brown's album X titled "Don't Be Gone Too Long", and it was originally set for release on March 25; however, it was postponed to April due to Brown being sent to jail awaiting trial on assault charges. On March 17, Grande held a live stream to make up for the single's delay, where she previewed four new songs from her then upcoming second studio album. Two days following the announcement, Grande revealed that due to the song's delay, she would be releasing the first single from her upcoming second studio album instead. She finished working on the album in late May 2014, confirming the title of the album (to be My Everything) and the release date (to be August 25) on June 28. The photos for the packaging in the album were taken on May 27. Grande stated that she chose the cover artwork because she felt that "each song is so strongly themed that I just wanted to have a very simple overall cover. So that within each song we could create more visual themes."

== Music and lyrics ==
In My Everything, Grande focuses on her sound of pop, R&B, and electropop. Its tracks include tunes of EDM, hip hop and piano-driven ballads, described by Adam Markovitz of Entertainment Weekly as "lyrically bland, sonically inoffensive, and artistically empty". Rolling Stone author Rob Sheffield depicted My Everything's tracks as a "confident, intelligent, [and] brazen pop" songs that combine bubblegum pop vocals with EDM-influenced productions. The album revisits the 1990s retro-R&B style present in Yours Truly; Annie Zaleski from The A.V. Club described the album as a "slick throwback to melodramatic '80s and '90s pop". According to Pitchfork's Meaghan Garvey, it places greater emphasis on upbeat and dance-oriented songs than the ballad-driven approach of Yours Truly, reflecting a "refreshingly grown-up".

AllMusic's Stephen Thomas Erlewine noted that My Everything marked a more contemporary musical direction, as Grande collaborated with a wide range of modern producers and guest artists throughout the album. The record alternates between themes of heartbreak and sexuality, while occasionally revealing more personal moments; it explores ballads and more emotionally earnest material in the songs like the title track and "Love Me Harder". My Everything also revisits relationship-centered themes such as resisting unwanted partners, coping with breakups, and navigating idealized romances in "Problem", "Best Mistake", "My Everything", and "Only 1".

=== Songs ===
My Everything opens with "Intro", in which Grande addresses her fans: "I'll give you all I have and nothing less." The second track is the lead single "Problem", a dance track filled with saxophone sounds, jazz and funk. Rap-Up described the track as an "infectious horn-heavy jam" that features a "carefree" Grande "declaring her independence". It includes "an empowering verse from Iggy Azalea and a whispering Big Sean on the hook." "One Last Time" is a dance-pop and EDM-light song. The album continues with "Why Try", co-written and co-produced by Ryan Tedder and Benny Blanco and features the lyrics "Now we're screaming just to see who's louder". Some critics expressed an opinion that the song has a similar composition with American singer Beyoncé's "XO" (2013; also produced by Tedder).

The album's fifth track is "Break Free", which infuses the sound with electro genres. In an interview with Billboard, Grande described the song as "fantastic and super-experimental for [her]", as most of her previous work had been more urban and R&B-driven, stating: "I never thought I'd do an EDM song, but that was an eye-opening experience, and now all I want to do is dance." The album's first of three ballads, "Best Mistake", features Big Sean. Jason Lipshutz of the same publication described it as "a moody ballad that grows stickier upon each listen", stating that it "carries a tidy collection of impressive production details, the momentary string stabs among them". Musically, it is a minimal R&B and hip-hop piano ballad lament that utilizes instrumentation from strings and a drum machine. It tells a story about a couple trying to "make up their minds about the future of their relationship, with deep affection buried underneath their problems." "Be My Baby" featuring Cashmere Cat is an R&B track, compared with American singer Mariah Carey's songs. The eighth track is "Break Your Heart Right Back"—an R&B number featuring Childish Gambino. It is about a cheating boyfriend and samples Diana Ross's "I'm Coming Out", including vocals and guitar.

"Love Me Harder", featuring the Weeknd, is a mid-tempo synthpop and R&B song, which starts small before its "'throbbing', electro-heavy chorus", with a guitar riff, while "big vacuum-esque synths zip" can be heard throughout the track. Rob Copsey wrote for Official Charts that the song reminded him of Canadian rapper Drake at his most emotional. Lyrically, the song has Grande demanding romantic satisfaction, using double entendres about BDSM. "Just a Little Bit of Your Heart" is the album's second ballad, co-written by Harry Styles. Copsey compared the eleventh track, "Hands on Me", featuring ASAP Ferg, with Rihanna's "Cockiness (Love It)" (2012) and Azalea's "Fancy" (2014). Lipshutz described "Hands on Me" as "an out-of-left-field banger that removes Grande from her teenybopper phase and finds the 21-year-old discovering her inner Rihanna with lines." The title track concludes the standard edition of the album on a somber note, recalling "Intro", and concerns Grande's struggles to regain the solid footing she once had with her partner.

The first bonus track on the deluxe edition, "Bang Bang", featuring Jessie J and Nicki Minaj is an uptempo, pop-infused soul song that features a "clap-heavy" production built over "big bouncy beats and horn blasts". The next track "Only 1" was described by Billboard as "short, snappy and sumptuous" and "a light confection that succeeds due to its busy, intricate percussion". The deluxe edition of My Everything concludes with the track "You Don't Know Me", with Grande "giv[ing] a whole new meaning to not judging a book by its cover", according to Kelsie Gibson of Bustle.

== Release and promotion ==
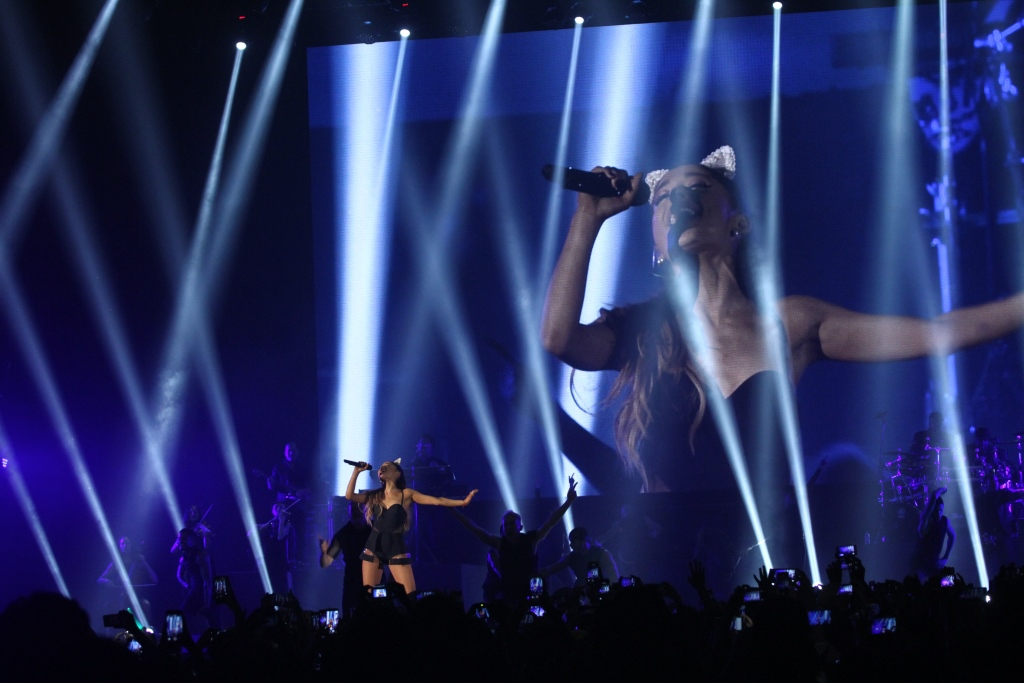
Grande performing during the Honeymoon Tour at JIExpo in Jakarta in 2015

On June 28, 2014, Grande announced that My Everything would be available for pre-order through her website. Those who pre-ordered the album would get exclusive access to Grande's iHeartRadio concert stream that held on August 24, where she performed songs from her album live for the first time. Grande embarked on her first world tour titled the Honeymoon Tour, in support of the album which began in February 2015. In the weeks preceding the release of My Everything, several previews of songs from the album were released; on July 7, Grande posted a teaser of "Best Mistake" onto her Instagram page, featuring rapper Big Sean. On July 27, a preview for "Be My Baby" was filmed at a concert of featured artist, Cashmere Cat.

Twenty days before the album's release, Grande released a preview of "Love Me Harder", which features Canadian recording artist the Weeknd, onto her Instagram profile. On August 20, four songs from the album, "Why Try", "Be My Baby", "Love Me Harder", and "Just a Little Bit of Your Heart", were released courtesy of MTV. On August 24, Grande opened the 2014 MTV Video Music Awards with "Break Free" and then later appeared to perform "Bang Bang" with Jessie J and Nicki Minaj. Following her performance on the show, My Everything was released on August 25. During the week of its release, commercials aired on television to promote My Everything as well as the Beats Pill. On August 29, Grande performed "Problem", "Break Free", "Bang Bang", and "Break Your Heart Right Back" on The Today Show. In addition to performing, Grande was also interviewed, forecasted to weather and brought her grandmother for an interview of her own. On September 5, Grande performed the title track from My Everything during the Stand Up to Cancer television program in dedication to her grandfather, who had died from cancer earlier that year.

=== Singles ===
Grande started to tease My Everything's lead single, "Problem", in April 2014. She first let her fans vote choosing its cover artwork, and later revealed that Australian rapper Iggy Azalea would be featured on the song. She premiered the song at the 2014 Radio Disney Music Awards on April 26, and released it for digital download two days later. The song debuted at number three on the US Billboard Hot 100 and sold 438,000 units in its first week making it the fifth largest debut by a woman in history. The single later peaked at number two on the chart, holding that position for five non-consecutive weeks. It has sold 3.7 million copies in the US and has been certified eight-times platinum by the Recording Industry Association of America (RIAA). During an interview with Wango Tango on May 10, Grande stated that she wanted to release "Break Free", featuring music producer Zedd, as the next single. Released on July 2, the song debuted at number 15 on the US Billboard Hot 100 with 161,000 downloads sold in its first week. After the release of its music video, "Break Free" soared on the chart from number 18 to number four. It also reached number one on the US Dance/Electronic Digital Songs chart. "Break Free" has sold 1.9 million copies as of June 2020, certified five-times platinum by the RIAA.

"Bang Bang", a collaboration with Jessie J and Nicki Minaj, was started to be teased on July 9. Republic Records sent it to hot adult contemporary radios on July 28, and a day later, Lava and Republic Records released it as a digital download, making it as a joint single. It serves as the lead single from Jessie J's album Sweet Talker, and the third single from My Everything. The song debuted at number six and peaked at number three on the US Billboard Hot 100, while debuting atop the UK Singles Chart. As of November 2017, "Bang Bang" has sold 3.5 million copies in the US since its release, while it was certified diamond by the RIAA in 2024—becoming the first all-female collaboration to achieve the threshold. Its music video has over 2 billion views on YouTube, as of July 2024. "Best Mistake" featuring Big Sean was released on August 12, as a promotional single. It sold 104,000 units in its first week landing at number six on the Digital Songs chart, peaking at number 49 on the US Billboard Hot 100.

The fourth single, "Love Me Harder", which features Canadian singer the Weeknd, was released to rhythmic crossover radio on September 30. It debuted at number 79 on the US Billboard Hot 100; it later peaked at number seven on the chart—making Grande the artist with the most top-ten singles in 2014—and became the Weeknd's first top ten entry in the country. As of April 2018, the song had sold 1.3 million copies; it was certified five-times platinum by the RIAA in 2024. "One Last Time" was released to rhythmic crossover and contemporary hit radio stations on February 10, 2015, as the fifth and final single. It debuted at number 80 on the US Billboard Hot 100 and peaked at number 13, becoming the only single from the album to not reach the top ten. As of June 2020, "One Last Time" has sold 918,000 digital units in the US; it was certified quadruple platinum by the RIAA in 2024.

=== Reissue ===
Happy tenth anniversary to an album that very much changed my life. I love you all so much and am deeply grateful always. Hope you enjoy these little anniversary celebration surprise.

— Grande, celebrating the album's tenth anniversary

Surprise released on August 22, 2024, the reissue was made available in two formats: a digital deluxe edition and a vinyl deluxe. The digital re-issue includes the bonus tracks "Too Close" and "Cadillac Song", which were previously Target CD-exclusives. The vinyl edition was made available for pre-order on August 22; it comprises the original tracklist, digital bonus tracks, and the deluxe tracks previously never available in vinyl format: "Bang Bang", "Only 1", "You Don't Know Me". A limited 7-inch vinyl of the album's singles—"Problem", "Break Free", "Love Me Harder", and "One Last Time"—was issued on August 26, followed by a digital bundle featuring a capella and instrumental versions of those singles along with "Bang Bang" a day later. An anniversary merchandise collection was also released.

== Critical reception ==
Professional ratings
Aggregate scores
Source	Rating
AnyDecentMusic?	6.3/10
Metacritic	64/100
Review scores
Source	Rating
AllMusic	3.5/5 stars
The A.V. Club	C+
Billboard	81/100
Entertainment Weekly	B−
The Guardian	3/5 stars
Los Angeles Times	3/4 stars
The Observer	2/5 stars
Pitchfork	7.7/10
Rolling Stone	3.5/5 stars

On Metacritic, which assigns a weighted average score out of 100 to ratings and reviews from mainstream critics, My Everything received an average of 64, based on 19 reviews, which the cite defines as "generally favorable reviews".

Critics praised My Everything for showcasing Grande's artistic growth, vocal performances, and transition into a more mature pop sound. Rob Sheffield, writing for Rolling Stone, viewed it as evidence of Grande's artistic growth, describing the album as a "brazen pop" record that combines "bubblegum diva vocals" with EDM-influenced production. Elysa Gardner, on behalf of USA Today, noted that she balances ballads and "more emotionally earnest fare" with a "girlish playfulness" and "growing confidence" throughout the album, while AllMusic's Stephen Thomas Erlewine wrote that Grande approaches the album less as a traditional diva vocalist and more as a "pop ringleader". Jason Lipshutz from Billboard and Gary Graff of The Oakland Press believed that My Everything "turned Grande into a dance artist, pop artist, and soul artist" with a more uniformed and more mature sound, and to be her "solid step forward" as well as an "intriguing promise rather than a threat", respectively. In a review for Pitchfork, Meaghan Garvey viewed the album as marking Grande's emergence as a "true pop" artist rather than a "charming novelty", and felt that its songs effectively reflected contemporary music that "may not be timeless". Mikael Wood, writing on behalf of the Los Angeles Times, found Grande in impressive form because she waa "deeply cheerful yet with guns blazing, an innocent newcomer no more". Writing for Vibe magazine, Adelle Platon was positive towards the album's sound and compared Grande's vocals to those of Mariah Carey and Christina Aguilera.

However, several reviewers criticized the album's lack of cohesion and distinct artistic identity despite praising Grande's vocal ability. Jim Farber from the New York Daily News wrote that Grande's "sexed-up" vocals and range are shown off but the "constant jerking back and forth between styles interrupts any sense of flow". Caroline Sullivan from The Guardian also praised her vocals, but felt that the songs are indistinct and have a "facelessness" to them. Annie Zaleski of The A.V. Club felt that My Everything was highly "well-constructed and designed to succeed", though she argued that its presentation left limited room for "any depth of character (or real surprises) surface". Nevertheless, she believed it made Grande a "consummate performer and vocal interpreter". Kitty Empire from The Observer notes that Grande's vocal ability was showcased, but the songs lack personality, while Evan Sawdey—writing for PopMatters—commented that Grande mimicked other artists, leaving her distinguished voice with only the support of hollow lyricism. In agreement, Will Robinson of Sputnikmusic stated it "ends up ringing hollow". Adam Markovitz of Entertainment Weekly criticized the album's songwriting and production as lacking artistic distinctiveness, though he acknowledged moments of enjoyment on songs such as "Problem" and "Bang Bang". Andrew Chan of Slant Magazine wrote that Grande prioritized the "sheer fun of singing" over "emotional urgency" on the album, though he argued that her vocal style still lacked some depth and variety.

The album was placed at number eleven on Digital Spy's Best Albums of 2014 list. Jessica Goodman and Ryan Kistobak of The Huffington Post included the album on their list of 2014's best releases, commenting that the album makes sure "Grande's sheer talent did not go unnoticed". More than three years after the album's release, Grande's kneeling pose on a stool for the album's cover suddenly became a viral on Twitter, spawning memes, a challenge taken up by many to try to recreate the pose, and various international press coverage. (Note: Attributed to multiple sources)

== Accolades ==
My Everything received several accolades following its release; at the 57th Annual Grammy Awards in 2015, the album was nominated for Best Pop Vocal Album. The same year, it won Best 3 Albums (International) at the Japan Gold Disc Awards, and received a nomination for Favorite Album at the People's Choice Awards.

Year	Award	Category	Result	Ref.
2015	Grammy Awards	Best Pop Vocal Album	Nominated	
2015	Japan Gold Disc Awards	Best 3 Albums (International)	Won	
2015	People's Choice Awards	Favorite Album	Nominated	

== Commercial performance ==
My Everything sold over 160,000 copies in its first week, debuting at number one on the US Billboard 200 and selling 169,000 copies in its ending week. Grande attained her second consecutive number-one album in the country, becoming the first female artist to have her first two albums debut at number one since Scottish singer Susan Boyle did it with I Dreamed a Dream (2009) and The Gift (2010). The album has sold 759,000 copies in the United States as of April 2018. In 2015, My Everything was ranked as the 17th most popular album of the year on the Billboard 200. RIAA certified the album quadruple platinum in 2014, for sales of four million album-equivalent units.

In Japan, My Everything remained atop the iTunes Store chart for nine weeks, earning Grande the longest at number one in 2014 and breaking the previous record held by Frozen: Original Motion Picture Soundtrack. Internationally, My Everything reached number one in Australia, Belgium (Flanders), Canada, Norway, and Taiwan, while peaking within the top five in countries including Austria, Denmark, Germany, Ireland, Italy, Mexico, New Zealand, Spain, Sweden, Switzerland, and the United Kingdom. It also entered the top ten in Brazil, China, Finland, Greece, Poland, Portugal, and South Korea's International Albums Chart. As of December 2014, the album has sold 1.8 million copies worldwide.

== Track listing ==
Standard edition
No.	Title	Writer(s)	Producer(s)	Length
1.	"Intro"	Tommy (TBHits) Brown; Victoria McCants; Ariana Grande	Brown	1:20
2.	"Problem" (featuring Iggy Azalea)	Ilya Salmanzadeh; Max Martin; Savan Kotecha; Azalea; Grande	Martin^{[a]}; Ilya^{[a]}; Shellback; Peter Carlsson^{[b]}	3:13
3.	"One Last Time"	David Guetta; Kotecha; Giorgio Tuinfort; Rami Yacoub; Carl Falk	Falk; Rami^{[a]}; Ilya^{[b]}^{[c]}; Tuinfort^{[c]}; Kotecha^{[b]}	3:17
4.	"Why Try"	Benjamin Levin; Ryan Tedder; Ammar Malik; Noel Zancanella	Tedder; Benny Blanco; Zancanella	3:31
5.	"Break Free" (featuring Zedd)	Anton Zaslavski; Martin; Kotecha	Zedd; Martin	3:34
6.	"Best Mistake" (featuring Big Sean)	Sean Anderson; Dwane Weir; Grande	Key Wane; Sauce^{[b]}	3:52
7.	"Be My Baby" (featuring Cashmere Cat)	Levin; Magnus August Høiberg; Theron Thomas; Timothy Thomas; Peder Losnegård	Blanco; Cashmere Cat; Lido	3:37
8.	"Break Your Heart Right Back" (featuring Childish Gambino)	Kirby Dockery; Andrew "Pop" Wansel; Warren "Oak" Felder; Donald Glover; Bernard Edwards; Nile Rodgers; Steven Jordan; Christopher Wallace; Sean Combs; Mason Betha	@PopWansel; @Oakwud	4:13
9.	"Love Me Harder" (with the Weeknd)	Martin; Kotecha; Peter Svensson; Ali Payami; Abel Tesfaye; Ahmad Balshe	Payami; Svensson; P. Carlsson^{[d]}	3:56
10.	"Just a Little Bit of Your Heart"	Harry Styles; Johan Carlsson	J. Carlsson^{[a]}; P. Carlsson^{[b]}	3:51
11.	"Hands on Me" (featuring ASAP Ferg)	Rodney Jerkins; Alicia Renee Williams; Adrianne Birge; Darold Ferguson, Jr.	Jerkins; Paul "Hot Sauce" Dawson	3:12
12.	"My Everything"	Brown; McCants; Taylor Parks; Grande	Brown; McCants^{[b]}	2:49
Total length:				40:25

Deluxe edition
No.	Title	Writer(s)	Producer(s)	Length
13.	"Bang Bang" (with Jessie J and Nicki Minaj)	Martin; Kotecha; Rickard Göransson; Onika Maraj	Martin; Göransson; Ilya; Kuk Harrell^{[b]}	3:18
14.	"Only 1"	Brown; Travis Sayles; McCants; Dennis Jenkins; Grande	Brown; Sayles; McCants^{[b]}	3:14
15.	"You Don't Know Me"	Harmony Samuels; Helen "Carmen Reece" Culver; Al Sherrod Lambert; Maurice David Wade; Grande	Samuels; Jo Blaq^{[b]}	3:52
Total length:				50:49

Tenth anniversary edition
No.	Title	Writer(s)	Producer(s)	Length
16.	"Cadillac Song"	Brown; Sayles; McCants; Leon Sylvers; Grande	Brown; Sayles; McCants^{[b]}	2:52
17.	"Too Close"	Samuels; Culver; Lambert; Wade; Grande	Samuels; Jo Blaq^{[b]}	3:35
Total length:				57:16

=== Notes ===
- ^{^[a]} denotes a main and vocal producer.
- ^{^[b]} denotes a vocal producer.
- ^{^[c]} denotes a co-producer.
- ^{^[d]} denotes an additional vocal producer.
- Latin American edition includes the bonus remix track "Problem" which also features J Balvin as track 16.
- Walmart exclusive edition includes the bonus remix track "Problem (Wayne G club mix)" as track 16.
- Tracks 16 and 17 were initially available exclusively on the Target edition.
- Japanese edition includes the bonus remix track "Baby I" featuring Taro Hakase as track 18.
- French new edition includes the bonus remix tracks "One Last Time (Attends-moi)" featuring Kendji Girac, "Love Me Harder" (Alex Ghenea remix), and "One Last Time" (Gazzo remix) as tracks 16, 17, and 18.
- Italian edition includes the bonus remix tracks "One Last Time" (featuring Fedez), "Love Me Harder" (Alex Ghenea remix), and "One Last Time (Gazzo remix)" as tracks 16, 17, and 18.
- The Belgian Fnac deluxe edition includes a bonus disc which features two bonus remixes of "Problem" (DJ Buddha dub remix, and DJ Class remix).
- The Japanese deluxe edition includes a bonus DVD which features the music and lyric video of "Problem", and an official interview.

=== Sample credits ===
- "Problem" interpolates lyrics from "99 Problems" by Jay-Z.
- "Break Your Heart Right Back" contains elements of both "Mo Money Mo Problems" by The Notorious B.I.G. and "I'm Coming Out" by Diana Ross.
- "Only 1" samples "Make The Music With Your Mouth, Biz" by Biz Markie feat. T.J. Swan.
- "Cadillac Song" contains samples from "How Love Hurts" written by Leon Sylvers.

== Credits and personnel ==
Credits were adapted from the liner notes.

=== Recording locations ===
- Glenwood Palace; Burbank, California
- Chalice Recording, Conway Recording, Larrabee North, London Bridge, Record Plant, Vietom, Wake Up Work; Los Angeles
- Hollywood, Zedd1; Santa Monica, California
- Patriot Studios; Denver, Colorado
- Studio at the Palms; Las Vegas, Nevada
- Matzah Ball, Doe Studios; New York City
- Wolf Cousins, Kinglet, P.S Studios; Stockholm, Sweden
- Metropolis; London, UK

=== Vocal credits ===
- Ariana Grande – lead vocals
- Big Sean – featured artist, background vocals
- Iggy Azalea – featured artist
- The Weeknd – featured artist
- ASAP Ferg – featured artist
- Childish Gambino – featured artist
- Victoria McCants – background vocals
- Savan Kotecha – background vocals
- Ilya – background vocals
- Jeanette Olsson – background vocals
- Max Martin – background vocals
- Sibel – background vocals
- Joi Gilliam – background vocals
- Taura Stinson – background vocals
- Chonita "N'Dambi" Gillespie – background vocals
- Rickard Göransson – background vocals

=== Managerial and creative ===
- Andre Marsh – A&R coordinator
- Wendy Goldstein – A&R, executive producer
- Naim Alli McNair – A&R
- Jessica Severn – album design
- Ariana Grande – executive producer
- Scott "Scooter" Braun – executive producer, management
- Allison Kaye – management
- Tom Munro – photographer
- Donna Gryn – marketing manager
- Brad Haugen – marketing manager
- Laura Hess – marketing manager

=== Technical ===
- Ariana Grande – vocal producer
- Victoria McCants – vocal producer
- Tommy Brown – producer, programmer, engineer
- Serban Ghenea – mixing
- John Hanes – mixing engineer
- Tom Coyne – mastering
- Aya Merrill – mastering
- Ilya – producer, vocal producer, guitar, bass, keyboards, programmer
- Max Martin – producer, vocal producer, keyboards, programmer
- Savan Kotecha – producer, vocal producer
- Shellback – producer, keyboards, programmer
- Peter Carlsson – vocal producer, engineer, vocal engineer
- Sam Holland – engineer
- Leon Silva – saxophone
- Rami Yacoub – producer, vocal producer, programmer
- Carl Falk – producer, programmer, guitar
- Eric Weaver – engineer
- Benjamin Levin – producer, programmer, instrumentation
- Ryan Tedder – producer, programmer, instrumentation
- Noel Zancanella – producer, programmer, instrumentation
- Chris Sclafani – engineer
- Matthew Tryba – engineer
- Bradford H. Smith – assistant engineer
- Phil Seaford – assistant mixing engineer
- Andrew Luftman – production coordinator
- Seif Hussain – production coordinator
- Anton Zaslavski – producer, mixing, programmer, instrumentation
- Ryan Shanahan – engineer
- Jesse Taub – engineer
- Cory Brice – engineer
- Dwane Weir – producer
- Sauce – vocal producer
- Magnus August Hoiberg – producer, programmer, instrumentation
- Peder Losnegard – producer, programmer, instrumentation
- Pop Wansel – producer
- Oak Felder – producer
- Kevin Guardado – assistant producer
- Peter Svensson – producer
- Ali Payami – producer, programmer, bass, drums, keyboard, percussion
- Jason Quenneville – engineer
- Niklas Ljungfelt – guitar
- Peter Zimney – saxophone
- Johan Carlsson – producer, vocal producer, programmer, instrumentation
- Mattias Bylund – strings
- Rodney Jerkins – producer, instrumentation
- Paul Dawson– producer, instrumentation
- Matt Champlin – recorder
- Kim Lumpkin – production coordinator
- Rickard Göransson – producer, programmer, percussion
- Jonas Thander – horns
- Travis Sayles – producer, instrumentation
- Harmony Samuels – producer, instrumentation
- Carmen Reece – vocal arranger
- Jose Cardoza – engineer, recorder
- Jo Blaq – vocal producer

== Charts ==
=== Weekly charts ===
Weekly chart performance
Chart (2014–2019)	Peak position
Australian Albums (ARIA)	1
Austrian Albums (Ö3 Austria)	3
Belgian Albums (Ultratop Flanders)	1
Belgian Albums (Ultratop Wallonia)	11
Brazilian Albums (ABPD)	7
Canadian Albums (Billboard)	1
Chinese Albums (Sino)	8
Croatian Albums (HDU)	31
Danish Albums (Hitlisten)	2
Dutch Albums (Album Top 100)	3
Finnish Albums (Suomen virallinen lista)	8
French Albums (SNEP)	18
German Albums (Offizielle Top 100)	5
Greek Albums (IFPI Greece)	5
Irish Albums (IRMA)	2
Italian Albums (FIMI)	4
Japanese Albums (Oricon)	3
Mexican Albums (AMPROFON)	4
New Zealand Albums (RMNZ)	3
Norwegian Albums (VG-lista)	1
Polish Albums (ZPAV)	9
Portuguese Albums (AFP)	7
Scottish Albums (Official Charts)	4
South Korean Albums (Circle)	35
South Korean International Albums (Circle)	3
Spanish Albums (Promusicae)	3
Swedish Albums (Sverigetopplistan)	2
Swiss Albums (Schweizer Hitparade)	2
Taiwan International Albums (G-Music)	1
UK Albums (Official Charts)	3
US Billboard 200	1

=== Year-end charts ===
Year-end chart performance
Chart (2014)	Position
Australian Albums (ARIA)	37
Belgian Albums (Ultratop Flanders)	99
Belgian Albums (Ultratop Wallonia)	154
Canadian Albums (Billboard)	46
Danish Albums (Tracklisten)	46
Dutch Albums (MegaCharts)	32
French Albums (SNEP)	146
Italian Albums (FIMI)	85
Japanese Albums (Oricon)	35
Mexican Albums (AMPROFON)	26
New Zealand Albums (RMNZ)	50
South Korean International Albums (Circle)	88
Swedish Albums (Sverigetopplistan)	21
UK Albums (OCC)	88
US Billboard 200	46
Worldwide Albums (IFPI)	13
Chart (2015)	Position
Australian Albums (ARIA)	75
Danish Albums (Tracklisten)	14
Dutch Albums (MegaCharts)	60
French Albums (SNEP)	103
Italian Albums (FIMI)	55
Japanese Albums (Billboard Japan)	30
Japanese Albums (Oricon)	83
Mexican Albums (AMPROFON)	22
Spanish Albums (PROMUSICAE)	82
Swedish Albums (Sverigetopplistan)	10
UK Albums (OCC)	89
US Billboard 200	17
Chart (2016)	Position
Dutch CombiAlbum Chart (MegaCharts)	96
Japanese Albums (Billboard Japan)	59
Chart (2017)	Position
UK Albums (OCC)	81
Chart (2025)	Position
Belgian Albums (Ultratop Flanders)	191

=== Decade-end charts ===
Decade-end chart performance
Chart (2010–2019)	Position
US Billboard 200	146

== Certifications ==
Certifications and sales
Region	Certification	Certified units/sales
Australia (ARIA)	2× Platinum	140,000^{‡}
Austria (IFPI Austria)	Platinum	15,000^{*}
Brazil (Pro-Música Brasil)	Gold	30,000^{*}
Canada (Music Canada)	5× Platinum	400,000^{‡}
Chile	Gold	5,000
Denmark (IFPI Danmark)	3× Platinum	60,000^{‡}
France (SNEP)	Platinum	100,000^{‡}
Germany (BVMI)	Gold	100,000^{‡}
Italy (FIMI)	Platinum	50,000^{‡}
Japan (RIAJ)	Gold	181,000
Mexico (AMPROFON)	3× Platinum	180,000^{^}
Netherlands (NVPI)	Platinum	50,000^{^}
New Zealand (RMNZ)	4× Platinum	60,000^{‡}
Norway (IFPI Norway)	6× Platinum	120,000^{‡}
Poland (ZPAV)	Platinum	20,000^{‡}
Singapore (RIAS)	Platinum	10,000^{*}
South Korea	—	1,541
Sweden (GLF)	Platinum	40,000^{‡}
Switzerland (IFPI Switzerland)	3× Platinum	60,000^{‡}
United Kingdom (BPI)	2× Platinum	600,000^{‡}
United States (RIAA)	4× Platinum	4,000,000^{‡}
Summaries
^{*} Sales figures based on certification alone.^{^} Shipments figures based on certification alone.^{‡} Sales+streaming figures based on certification alone.

Certifications and sales (Tenth Anniversary Edition)
Region	Certification	Certified units/sales
Brazil (Pro-Música Brasil)	Diamond	160,000^{‡}
^{‡} Sales+streaming figures based on certification alone.

== Release history ==
Release dates and formats
Region	Date	Format(s)	Edition(s)	Label(s)	Ref.
Various	August 22, 2014	CD; Digital download; streaming	Standard	Republic	
Various	August 22, 2014	Digital download; streaming	Deluxe	Republic	
Various	August 22, 2024	Digital download; streaming	Tenth Anniversary	Republic	
Various	December 6, 2024	LP	Tenth Anniversary	Republic	

== See also ==
- List of number-one albums of 2014 (Norway)
- List of number-one albums of 2014 (Australia)
- List of number-one albums of 2014 (Canada)
- List of number-one albums of 2014 (U.S.)
