= Wild Blessed Freedom =

Studio album by Carolina Liar
- Released: September 27, 2011
- Studio: Maratone, Stockholm
- Genre: Alternative rock Pop
- Length: 41:16
- Label: Maratone, AB
- Producer: Tobias Karlsson, Shellback, Max Martin, Michael Libert, Chad Wolf, Johan Carlsson

Carolina Liar chronology
| Coming to Terms (2008) | Wild Blessed Freedom (2011) |

Singles from Wild Blessed Freedom
- 1. "Drown" Released: July 12, 2011; 2. "Me and You" Released: March 20, 2012

Professional ratings
Review scores
| Source | Rating |
|---|---|
| Audiopinions | 9.5/10 stars |
| Allmusic | 3/5 stars |
| Consequence of Sound | (D) |
| Relate magazine | (favorable) |

Wild Blessed Freedom is the second studio album by Swedish-American alternative rock band Carolina Liar. It was released on September 27, 2011.

== History ==
On July 12, the band made the first single off the album, Drown, available through the iTunes Store. On July 18, the band released the music video for the song and preorders for the album were made available on July 20.

== Track listing ==
| No. | Title | Writer(s) | Producer(s) | Length |
|---|---|---|---|---|
| 1. | "Miss America" | Chad Wolf, Tobias Karlsson | Karlsson, Michael Libert | 4:04 |
| 2. | "No More Secrets" | Wolf, Shellback | Shellback | 4:15 |
| 3. | "Drown" | Wolf, Karlsson | Karlsson | 3:50 |
| 4. | "Me And You" | Wolf, Shellback | Shellback | 3:32 |
| 5. | "Beautiful People" | Wolf, Alexander Kronlund, Tom Hamilton | Max Martin, Shellback | 3:30 |
| 6. | "King Of Broken Hearts" | Wolf, Karlsson | Karlsson, Shellback, Libert | 3:56 |
| 7. | "I Don't Think So" | Wolf | Wolf Karlsson | 3:12 |
| 8. | "Daddy's Little Girl" | Wolf, Karlsson | Karlsson | 3:27 |
| 9. | "Feel Better Now" | Wolf, Johan Carlsson | Wolf, Karlsson, Carlsson | 3:02 |
| 10. | "Never Let You Down" | Wolf, Karlsson | Karlsson | 3:49 |
| 11. | "Salvation" | Wolf, Shellback | Shellback | 3:29 |
| 12. | "All That Comes Out Of My Mouth" | Wolf, Rickard Göransson, Shellback, Karlsson, Savan Kotecha | Martin, Shellback | 3:10 |

== Personnel ==
- Chad Wolf - lead vocals, guitar
- Rickard Göransson - guitar
- Johan Carlsson - keyboards
- Peter Carlsson - drums, percussion
- Erik Hääger - bass
