= Show Me What I'm Looking For =

Single by Carolina Liar

from the album Coming to Terms
- Released: May 6, 2008
- Recorded: 2005–2006
- Studio: Conway, Los Angeles; Maratone, Stockholm; Decibel, Stockholm
- Genre: Pop rock
- Length: 4:00
- Label: Atlantic
- Songwriters: Chad Wolf, Tobias Karlsson
- Producers: Max Martin, Tobias Karlsson

Carolina Liar singles chronology
"I'm Not Over" (2008)	"Show Me What I'm Looking For" (2008)	"Beautiful World" (2009)

Music video
- "Show Me What I'm Looking For" on YouTube

"Show Me What I'm Looking For" is a song by Swedish-American rock band Carolina Liar. The song was a hit in 2009, particularly in Ireland, where it rose up the Irish Singles Chart to number six. The song was also a radio hit on several stations in the United Kingdom and the United States. It peaked at number 67 on the Billboard Hot 100 in the United States as well and was a top ten hit on the Adult Top 40 chart. The song was certified double Platinum by the Recording Industry Association of America (RIAA). It also had a lengthy run on the top 20 video countdown of cable television network VH1. The song was written by lead singer Chad Wolf with Tobias Karlsson, and it was produced by Max Martin and Tobias Karlsson.

== Background ==
In the United Kingdom, "Show Me What I'm Looking For" was played on stations such as BBC Radio 1, Xfm, 95.8 Capital FM and Absolute Radio. It was released in the United Kingdom on June 1, 2009.

"Show Me What I'm Looking For" is said to have changed the band members' lives forever. According to vocalist Chad Wolf, the song was written in only twenty minutes, and the vocals used on the final track were his first attempt; recorded in a bedroom. "We tried...a couple of different studios to beat the vocals, but we just couldn't," Wolf explained. Hot Press called the song "a choon and a half" after witnessing it performed live at The Academy, Dublin, in August 2009. During live performances Wolf conducts the audience during the "Save Me/I'm lost" chorus.

== Reception ==
The Santa Barbara Independent described it as "sunny and poppy" and "a lot like early Phantom Planet". Digital Spy said it was "rock music for anyone who finds Snow Patrol a bit too giddy sometimes". The Houston Chronicle said it had "a tweentastic vibe" and that it was "easy to imagine lip-glossed girls swooning" over the single.

== Music video ==
Directed by Diane Martel, the video is set in Atlantic City, New Jersey where lead singer Chad Wolf roams the city with his guitar and is seen with many of the locals in a motel, the Trump Taj Mahal and near a boardwalk during the day and night.

== In popular culture ==
- "Show Me What I'm Looking For" was featured in numerous American television shows, including The Beautiful Life, The Hills, 90210 and Gossip Girl. When it featured on The Hills, iTunes recorded a boost in sales for the song of more than 3,000 units the following week.

The song's use in The CW Television Network series The Beautiful Life was described by the Boston Herald's reviewer Mark A. Perigard as "an inadvertently hilarious way to close one dramatic scene" and suggested that "the network needs to vet its background music more carefully".

- The song was also used in commercials for the ABC legal drama series Eli Stone, Army Wives, the 2009 film The Time Traveler's Wife, the trailer for the 2009 film Post Grad, 2009 MLB All-Star Game commercial on FOX and for various promos of the 2012 film The Odd Life of Timothy Green. The song was performed by America's Got Talent contestant Taylor Mathews during the semifinals. He then advanced to the finals.
- In Spring 2014, an instrumental version of the song was used in a UK advertising campaign for Swinton Insurance.
- The song has been used multiple times in vlogs by David Dobrik, with millions of views on YouTube.

== Track listing ==
- CD single
1. "Show Me What I'm Looking For" (Album Version) – 4:02
2. "Open the Door" – 4:26

== Charts ==
=== Weekly charts ===
Chart (2009)	Peak position
Denmark (Tracklisten)	28
European Hot 100 Singles (Billboard)	87
Germany (GfK)	93
Ireland (IRMA)	6
Netherlands (Dutch Top 40)	24
Netherlands (Single Top 100)	74
Scottish Singles Sales (Official Charts)	33
UK Singles (Official Charts)	31
US Billboard Hot 100	67
US Adult Alternative Airplay (Billboard)	24
US Adult Pop Airplay (Billboard)	10
US Alternative Airplay (Billboard)	28
US Digital Song Sales (Billboard)	52

=== Year-end charts ===
Chart (2009)	Position
US Adult Top 40 (Billboard)	37

== Certifications ==
Region	Certification	Certified units/sales
United States (RIAA)	2× Platinum	2,000,000^{‡}
^{‡} Sales+streaming figures based on certification alone.

== Release history ==
Release dates and formats for "Show Me What I'm Looking For"
Region	Date	Format	Label(s)	Ref.
United States	March 17, 2009	Mainstream airplay	Atlantic	
