= Carolina Liar =

American rock band

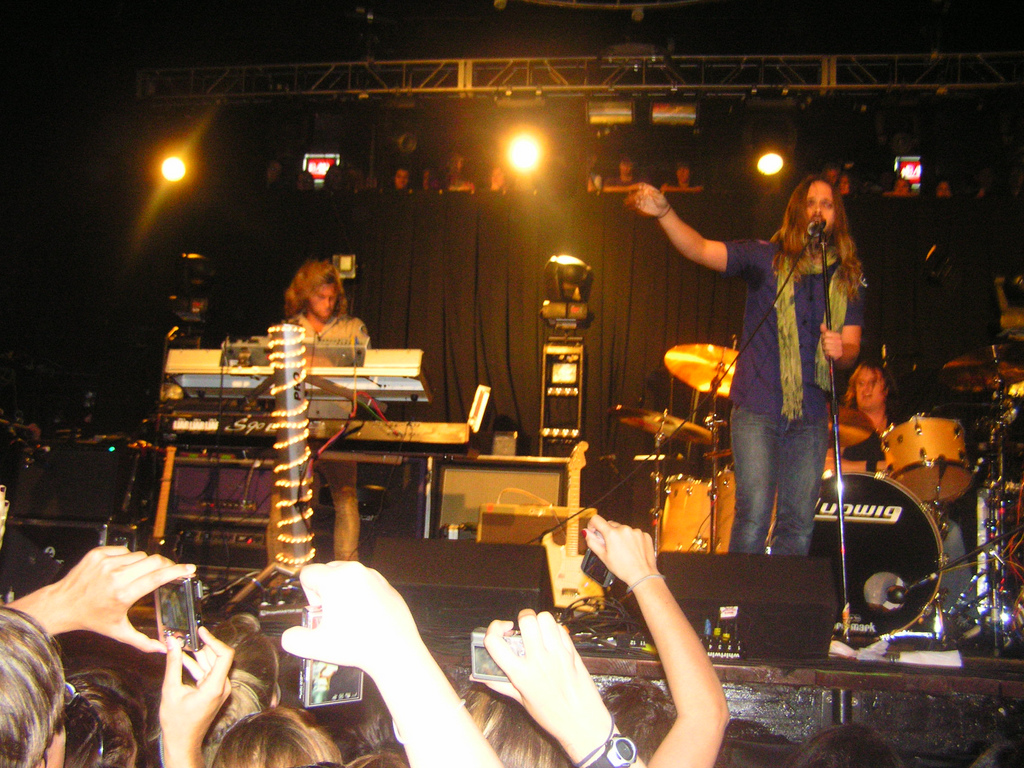
- Carolina Liar in 2008

Background information
- Origin: Moncks Corner, South Carolina, U.S. Stockholm, Sweden
- Genres: Pop rock, alternative rock
- Years active: 2006–present
- Labels: Atlantic; Maratone
- Members: Chad Wolf; Brian Ulery
- Past members: Jim Almgren Gândara; Max Grahn; Rickard Göransson; Johan Carlsson; Peter Carlsson; Erik Hääger

Carolina Liar is a Swedish-American pop rock band. Lead vocalist Chad Wolf is originally from Moncks Corner, South Carolina; other members originate from Stockholm, Sweden.

== History ==
The band is best known for the platinum certified single "Show Me What I'm Looking For" and gold certified "I'm Not Over" from their 2008 major-label debut album, Coming to Terms, produced by Max Martin and Tobias Karlsson.

The song "I'm Not Over" featured in the 2008 film What Happens in Vegas, starring Ashton Kutcher and Cameron Diaz, in the 2008 King of the Hill episode "Cops and Robert", and in the video game UEFA Euro 2008.

On March 3, 2009, the single "Show Me What I'm Looking For" was featured on the iTunes Store as the Free Single of the Week. "Show Me What I'm Looking For" appeared in FOX Sports commercials for the 2009 MLB All-Star Game, as well as MTV's The Hills.

"Show Me What I'm Looking For" and "Open the Door" were featured in commercials for Investigation Discovery's new show, Disappeared, and in promo spots for We TV's The Locator.

In the spring of 2014, an instrumental version of "Show Me What I'm Looking For" was used in an advertising campaign for Swinton Insurance. The TV advert featured the Britain's Got Talent 2013 winners, Attraction.

Carolina Liar was the supporting act on the David Cook/Gavin Degraw 2011 Fall Tour. In 2012, they were the opening act for the Kelly Clarkson/The Fray Tour.

Carolina Liar also played as the opening act for Rob Thomas while he was playing in New York City at the Beacon Theatre and the rest of the stops on his Cradlesong Tour.

Peter Carlsson co-produced Ariana Grande's single titled "Love Me Harder". Johan Carlsson co-wrote and co-produced her single titled "Dangerous Woman".

"Show Me What I'm Looking For" went viral on TikTok in 2021.

Wolf has collaborated twice with Martin Garrix.

Now operating with drummer Brian Ulery, Wolf released the single "I Am King" on June 26th.

Carolina Liar's music is also providing the soundtrack for the upcoming comedy Concert Heroes, where the songs serve as the soundtrack for the film's fictional band.

== Band members ==
Current members

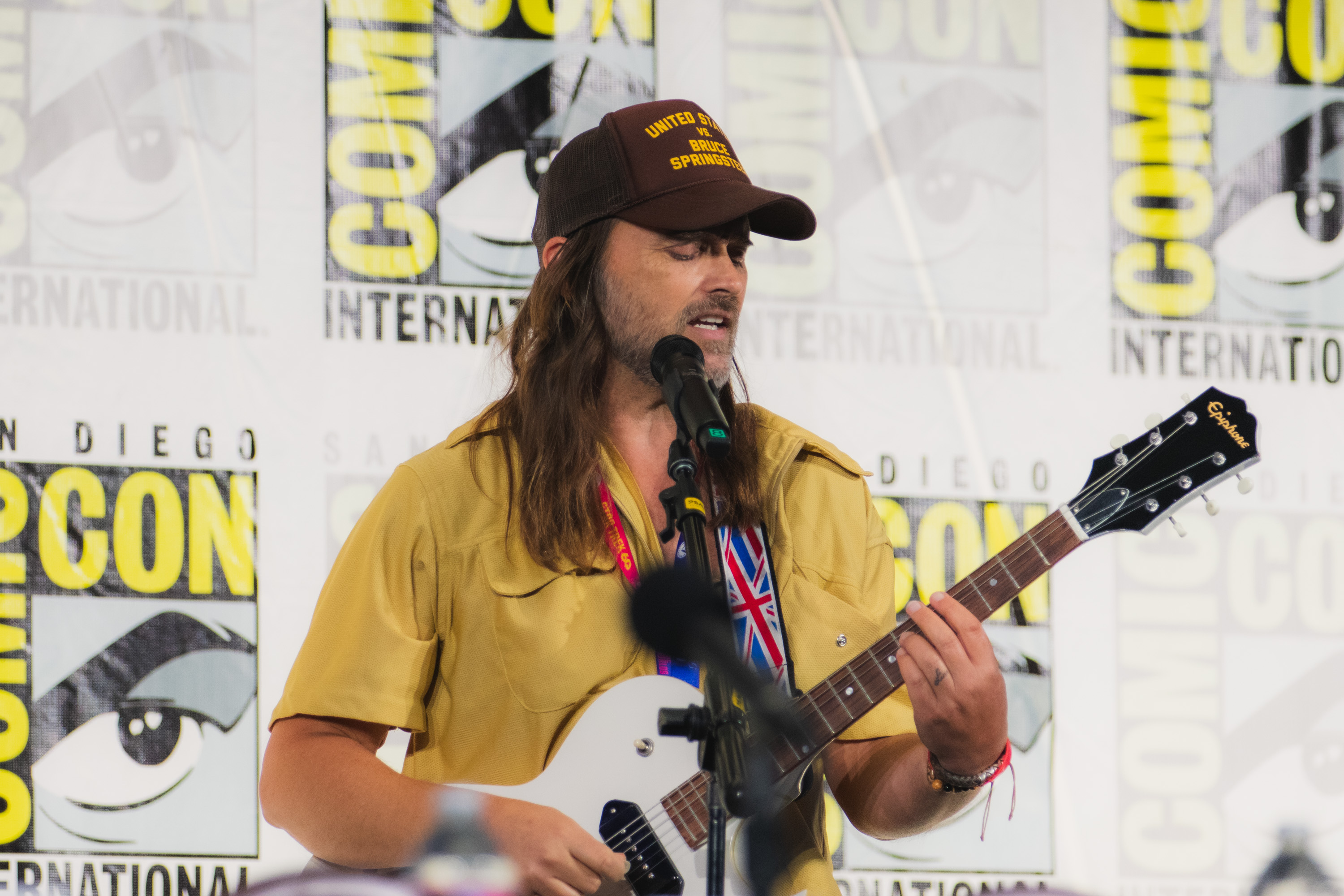
Wolf performing at San Diego Comic-Con 2026

- Chad Wolf – lead vocals, guitar (2007–present)
- Brian Ulery - drums (2023-present)

Past members

- Rickard Göransson – guitar (2007–2012)
- Johan Carlsson – keyboards (2007–2012)
- Erik Hääger – bass (2007–2012)
- Peter Carlsson – drums (2009–2012)
- Jim Almgren Gândara – guitar (2007–2009)
- Max Grahn – drums (2007–2009)

== Discography ==
=== Studio albums ===
Year	Album details	Peak chart positions		
Year	Album details	US	US Rock	US Heat
2008	Coming to Terms: Released: May 19, 2008; Label: Atlantic Records, Maratone AB	140	43	3
2011	Wild Blessed Freedom: Released: September 27, 2011; Label: Maratone AB	—	—	8

=== Singles ===
Year	Single	Peak chart positions									Certifications	Album
Year	Single	US	US Alt	US Adult	AUS	DNK	GER	IRL	NLD	UK	Certifications	Album
2008	"I'm Not Over"	— (Note: "I'm Not Over" did not enter the Billboard Hot 100, but peaked at number 19 on the Bubbling Under Hot 100 chart.)	3	—	28	—	—	—	—	—		Coming to Terms
2008	"Show Me What I'm Looking For"	67	28	8	—	28	93	6	74	31	RIAA: 2× Platinum	Coming to Terms
2009	"Beautiful World"	—	—	—	—	—	—	—	—	—		Coming to Terms
2011	"Drown"	—	—	37	—	—	—	—	—	—		Wild Blessed Freedom
2012	"Me and You"	—	—	—	—	—	—	—	—	—		Wild Blessed Freedom
2015	"Here I Go Again"	—	—	—	—	—	—	—	—	—		Non Album Single
2015	"Wrestling an Angel"	—	—	—	—	—	—	—	—	—		Non Album Single
2020	"Battlefields"	—	—	—	—	—	—	—	—	—		Non Album Single
2023	"Thank You"	—	—	—	—	—	—	—	—	—		Non Album Single
2024	"Slowly Breaking My Heart"	—	—	—	—	—	—	—	—	—		Non Album Single
"—" denotes releases that did not chart

== Production discography ==
=== Johan Carlsson ===
Title	Year	Artist	Album	Songwriting	Producing
"Nothing to Lose"	2013	Emblem3	Nothing to Lose	check	check
"Just a Little Bit of Your Heart"	2014	Ariana Grande	My Everything	check	check
"Fire"	2014	Gavin DeGraw	Finest Hour: The Best of Gavin DeGraw	check	check
"Live It Up"	2014	Colbie Caillat	Gypsy Heart	check	check
"Blaze"	2014	Colbie Caillat	Gypsy Heart		check
"Nice Guys"	2014	Colbie Caillat	Gypsy Heart	check	check
"Stockholm Syndrome"	2014	One Direction	Four	check	
"Goodnight"	2014	Cher Lloyd	Sorry I'm Late	check	check
"M.F.P.O.T.Y."	2014	Cher Lloyd	Sorry I'm Late	check	check
"Pieces"	2014	Ella Henderson	Chapter One	check	
"Give Your Heart Away"	2014	Ella Henderson	Chapter One	check	check
"1996"	2014	Ella Henderson	Chapter One	check	check
"I Love You"	2014	Alex & Sierra	It's About Us	check	check
"Unkiss Me"	2014	Maroon 5	V	check	check
"Falling Slow"	2015	Tori Kelly	Unbreakable Smile	check	check
"My House"	2015	Flo Rida	My House	check	check
"If I Could Fly"	2015	One Direction	Made in the A.M.	check	check
"For You"	2015	Demi Lovato	Confident	check	check
"Mr. Hughes"	2015	Demi Lovato	Confident	check	check
"Held By Me"	2015	The Vamps	Wake Up	check	
"Painkiller"	2015	Jason Derulo	Everything Is 4	check	check
"Let's Not Be Alone Tonight"	2015	R5	Sometime Last Night	check	check
"Take This Chance"	2015	Anastacia	Ultimate Collection	check	
"Talk About You"	2015	Mika	No Place in Heaven	check	
"Dangerous Woman"	2016	Ariana Grande	Dangerous Woman	check	check
"Harder to Believe"	2016	Gavin DeGraw	Something Worth Saving	check	check
"New Love"	2016	Gavin DeGraw	Something Worth Saving	check	check
"Then There's You"	2016	Charlie Puth	Nine Track Mind	check	check
"Hopeless Romantic"	2016	Meghan Trainor	Thank You	check	check
"Mom"	2016	Meghan Trainor	Thank You	check	check
"I Believe in You"	2016	Michael Bublé	Nobody but Me		check
"Nobody but Me"	2016	Michael Bublé	Nobody but Me		check
"Today is Yesterday's Tomorrow"	2016	Michael Bublé	Nobody but Me		check
"Someday"	2016	Michael Bublé	Nobody but Me		check
"Zillionaire"	2016	Flo Rida	The Perfect 10	check	check
"You Gotta Not"	2016	Little Mix	Glory Days	check	check
"Old Friends"	2017	Jasmine Thompson	Wonderland	check	check
"Change" (featuring James Taylor)	2018	Charlie Puth	Voicenotes	check	check
"Somebody Told Me"	2018	Charlie Puth	Voicenotes	check	check
"Diamonds are Forever"	2018	Sabrina Carpenter	Singular: Act I	check	check
"Exhale"	2019	Sabrina Carpenter	Singular: Act II	check	check
"Looking at Me"	2019	Sabrina Carpenter	Singular: Act II	check	check
"Perfect Now"	2020	Louis Tomlinson	Walls	check	check
"El Tejano" (featuring Sofía Reyes)	2020	Lauv	~how i'm feeling~	check	check
"Lion of Love"	2020	Erik Mjönes	Eurovision Song Contest: The Story of Fire Saga	check	
"Champagne Problems"	2020	Katy Perry	Smile	check	check
"Tucked"	2020	Katy Perry	Smile	check	check
"Harleys in Hawaii"	2020	Katy Perry	Smile	check	check
"What Makes a Woman"	2020	Katy Perry	Smile	check	check
"Small Talk"	2020	Katy Perry	Smile	check	check
"Never Worn White"	2020	Katy Perry	Smile	check	check
"What Do You Think Of?" (with Lukas Graham)	2020	Lauren Alaina	Getting Over Him	check	
"Elita"	2020	Gary Barlow, Michael Bublé and Sebastián Yatra	Non-album single	check	check
"The Christmas Sweater"	2021	Michael Bublé	Christmas (Deluxe 10th Anniversary Edition)		check
"Seven Days"	2021	THRDL!FE with Conor Maynard	Non-album single	check	
"Next"	2021	Olivia Holt	Dance Like No One's Watching	check	check
"i miss you (skin to skin)"	2022	Dylan Conrique	Non-album single	check	check
"Remind Me"	2022	Bastille	Give Me the Future + Dreams of the Past	check	
"The Story"	2022	Jewel	American Song Contest	check	check
"Stay"	2022	Sofia Carson	Sofia Carson	check	
"Sorry That I Miss You"	2022	Ella Henderson	Everything I Didn't Say	check	check
"One Life"	2023	Michael Bolton	Spark of Light	check	check
"1-800-GOT-STRESS"	2023	Devon Cole	Non-album single	check	check
"A Christmas Song"	2024	Björnzone	Non-album single	check	check
"Swimming with Sharks"	2024	New Hope Club	Non-album single	check	check
"Goddess in Disguise" (featuring MC Bola)	2024	Sofi Tukker	BREAD	check	check
"Gonna Find Out"	2024	Kate Hudson	Glorious		check
"Fire"	2024	Kate Hudson	Glorious	check	check
"The Nineties"	2024	Kate Hudson	Glorious	check	check
"Live Forever"	2024	Kate Hudson	Glorious	check	check
"Talk About Love"	2024	Kate Hudson	Glorious	check	check
"Love Ain't Easy"	2024	Kate Hudson	Glorious		check
"Romeo"	2024	Kate Hudson	Glorious		check
"Never Made a Moment"	2024	Kate Hudson	Glorious		check
"Lying to Myself"	2024	Kate Hudson	Glorious		check
"Not Easy to Know"	2024	Kate Hudson	Glorious		check
"Glorious"	2024	Kate Hudson	Glorious		check
"Touch the Light"	2024	Kate Hudson	Glorious		check
"Right on Time"	2024	Kate Hudson	Glorious		check
"Desert Warior"	2024	Kate Hudson	Glorious		check
"Joke's on Me"	2024	Sofia Carson	Non-album single	check	check
"Peace of Mind"	2025	Adrian Lyles	these are my favorite songs I've made so far	check	check
"Angel in Disguise"	2025	Matteo Bocelli	Falling in Love	check	check
"Chaotic & Confused"	2025	Jeon Somi	Chaotic & Confused	check	
"QUIT YOU"	2026	The Kid LAROI	Before I Forget	check	check

=== Peter Carlsson ===
Title	Year	Artist	Album	Songwriting	Producing
"Hold on Tight"	2013	Britney Spears	Britney Jean		check
"Problem"	2014	Ariana Grande	My Everything		check
"Love Me Harder"	2014	Ariana Grande	My Everything		check
"Just a Little Bit of Your Heart"	2014	Ariana Grande	My Everything		check
"Fire"	2014	Gavin DeGraw	Finest Hour: The Best of Gavin DeGraw		check
"M.F.P.O.T.Y."	2014	Cher Lloyd	Sorry I'm Late		check
"First Love"	2014	Jennifer Lopez	A.K.A.		check
"Once in a Lifetime"	2015	Flo Rida	My House		check
"Ghost Town"	2015	Adam Lambert	The Original High		check
"There I Said It"	2015	Adam Lambert	The Original High		check
"Lucy"	2015	Adam Lambert	The Original High		check
"The Light"	2015	Adam Lambert	The Original High		check
"Heavy Fire"	2015	Adam Lambert	The Original High		check
"For You"	2015	Demi Lovato	Confident		check
"Mr. Hughes"	2015	Demi Lovato	Confident		check
"Thinking Bout You"	2016	Ariana Grande	Dangerous Woman		check
"Still Falling for You"	2016	Ellie Goulding	Bridget Jones's Baby: Original Motion Picture Soundtrack		check
"Miss You More"	2017	Katy Perry	Witness		check
"Finish What We Started" (featuring Brandi Carlile)	2019	Zac Brown Band	The Owl		check
"Ugly"	2022	Dylan Conrique	Non-album single		check
"Superman"	2025	Sofronio Vasquez	Non-album single	check	

=== Rickard Göransson ===
Title	Year	Artist	Album	Songwriting	Producing
"Rock n Roll"	2013	Avril Lavigne	Avril Lavigne	check	check
"Bang Bang"	2014	Jessie J Ariana Grande; Nicki Minaj	Sweet Talker; My Everything	check	check
"Burnin' Up"	2014	Jessie J	Sweet Talker	check	
"There Goes My Baby"	2014	Enrique Iglesias	Sex and Love	check	check
"Skippin a Beat"	2014	Zara Larsson	1	check	
"Rooftop"	2014	Zara Larsson	1	check	
"Call It Whatever"	2014	Bella Thorne	—N/a	check	
"Nobody Love"	2015	Tori Kelly	Unbreakable Smile	check	check
"California Lovers"	2015	Tori Kelly	Unbreakable Smile	check	
"Once in a Lifetime"	2015	Flo Rida	My House		check
"Around the World"	2015	Natalie La Rose; Fetty Wap	TBA	check	
"Under You"	2016	Nick Jonas	Last Year Was Complicated	check	
"Never Been Hurt"	2016	The Band Perry	TBA	check	
"DNCE"	2016	DNCE	DNCE	check	
"Toothbrush"	2016	DNCE	DNCE	check	
"Zoom"	2016	DNCE	DNCE	check	
"Pay My Rent"	2016	DNCE	DNCE	check	
"Still Falling for You"	2016	Ellie Goulding	Bridget Jones's Baby: Original Motion Picture Soundtrack	check	
"Don't Talk About It"	2016	Tove Lo	Lady Wood	check	
"Breathe"	2017	Astrid S	Party's Over	check	check
"Empty Cups"	2018	Charlie Puth	Voicenotes	check	check
"God Is a Woman"	2018	Ariana Grande	Sweetener	check	
"Love Her Too" (featuring G-Eazy)	2018	Marc E. Bassy	Postmodern Depression	check	
"not ur friend"	2020	Jeremy Zucker	Love Is Not Dying	check	
"Husavik"	2020	Will Ferrell and Molly Sandén	Eurovision Song Contest: The Story of Fire Saga	check	
"Upgrade"	2020	Joji	Nectar	check	check
"Oh Na Na"	2021	Camila Cabello, Myke Towers and Tainy	Non-album single	check	
"No Time (For My Life to Suck)"	2022	Nina Nesbitt	Älskar	check	
"Impulsive"	2025	Khalid	After the Sun Goes Down	check	check

== Appearances ==
- Jimmy Kimmel Live! (June 12, 2008)
- 90210 (February 3, 2009, US) (April 27, 2009, UK)
- MTV Spanking New Session (June 23, 2009)
- The Ellen DeGeneres Show (May 6, 2009)
- BalconyTV Hamburg (September 8, 2009)
- Die Oliver Pocher Show (March 12, 2010)
- BETA Records TV (November 10, 2009)
