= Coming to Terms =

Studio album by Carolina Liar
- Released: May 19, 2008
- Genres: Alternative rock, indie rock
- Length: 45:02
- Labels: Atlantic; Maratone
- Producers: Tobias Karlsson; Max Martin; Per Aldeheim; Michael Ilbert; Rob Cavallo; Chad Wolf; Alexander Kronlund

Carolina Liar chronology
Coming to Terms (2008)	Wild Blessed Freedom (2011)

Singles from Coming to Terms
- 1. "I'm Not Over" Released: March 25, 2008; 2. "Show Me What I'm Looking For" Released: May 6, 2008

Coming to Terms is the debut studio album from Swedish-American rock band Carolina Liar. It was released on May 19, 2008 by Atlantic Records. The album garnered mixed reviews from critics. Coming to Terms debuted at number 140 on the US Billboard 200 and spawned two singles: "I'm Not Over" and "Show Me What I'm Looking For". To promote the record, the band opened for other rock acts on their respective tours.

== Promotion ==
On August 18, 2008, the band was announced alongside We the Kings and Hey Monday as supporting acts for The Academy Is... on their Bill & Trav's Bogus Journey Tour, beginning on October 1 at the Amos Southend in Charlotte and finishing on November 23 at the Town Ballroom in Buffalo. On June 24, 2009, the band were announced alongside OneRepublic as special guests for the North American leg of Rob Thomas' Cradlesong Tour, starting on September 23 at Hollywood's Hard Rock Live and finishing on November 12 at New York City's Beacon Theatre. On August 21, the band was announced as a special guest alongside Taking Back Sunday for the University of Alabama's Fall Concert on September 18 at the Coleman Coliseum.

== Critical reception ==
Professional ratings
Review scores
Source	Rating
Blender	3.5/5 stars
Consequence of Sound	C+
Rolling Stone	3/5 stars

Charity Stafford of AllMusic called the album "earnest and effective pop-rock ear candy." Nicole Frehsee of Rolling Stone called the band's musicianship of combining the "anthemic elements" of U2 and the Killers with Max Martin's production "pretty but a little confused." Ryan Dombal, writing for Blender, called the record's track listing "a handful of skyscraping, modern-rock behemoths", noting that Chad Wolf's lyrical artistry is "shamelessly straightforward" and that "every processed guitar chord and slick keyboard line steamrolls over the artlessness and emphasizes the universality in his tales." Alex Young of Consequence of Sound praised Wolf's vocal delivery for being "crisp, clear and easy to understand", Martin's production on "I'm Not Over" and "California Bound" and the band for making the music "well written and possess[s] strong chord progressions", calling it "some of the catchiest pop rock tunes in recent memory and for once, [the music] stands on its own." He concluded that: "Coming To Terms storms out of the gauntlet and delivers an awesome debut album. Let's hope that the band comes to terms on a follow-up real soon."

== Track listing ==
No.	Title	Writer(s)	Producer(s)	Length
1.	"I'm Not Over"	Chad Wolf; Tobias Karlsson	Karlsson; Max Martin; Michael Ilbert; Rob Cavallo	3:23
2.	"Coming to Terms"	Wolf; Karlsson	Karlsson; Martin	3:29
3.	"Last Night"	Wolf; Karlsson; Max Martin	Karlsson; Martin	3:50
4.	"Show Me What I'm Looking For"	Wolf; Karlsson	Karlsson; Martin	4:02
5.	"Simple Life"	Wolf; Karlsson	Wolf; Karlsson; Martin	3:31
6.	"All That Shit Is Gone"	Wolf; Alexander Kronlund	Martin; Kronlund	3:32
7.	"California Bound"	Wolf; Karlsson	Karlsson; Martin	3:59
8.	"Done Stealin'"	Wolf; Karlsson; Martin; Per Aldeheim	Karlsson; Aldeheim	3:38
9.	"Something to Die For"	Wolf; Peter Svensson; Aldeheim	Martin; Aldeheim	3:37
10.	"Beautiful World"	Wolf; Karlsson; Martin	Karlsson; Martin	4:08
11.	"Better Alone"	Wolf; Karlsson	Karlsson; Martin	3:52
12.	"When You Are Near"	Wolf; Svensson	Martin	4:01
Total length:				45:02

iTunes Store bonus tracks
No.	Title	Writer(s)	Producer(s)	Length
13.	"Open the Door"	Wolf; Karlsson	Karlsson; Martin	4:28
14.	"Hit Bottom"	Wolf; Karlsson	Karlsson; Martin	4:27
15.	"Undone"	Wolf; Karlsson	Karlsson; Martin	4:09

== Personnel ==
Credits for Coming to Terms adapted from AllMusic.

- Chad Wolf - lead vocals, guitar
- Rickard Göransson - guitar
- Johan Carlsson - keyboards
- Max Grahn - drums, percussion
- Erik Hääger - bass
- Jim Almgren Gândara - guitar

== Charts ==
Chart (2009)	Peak position
US Billboard 200	140
US Heatseekers Albums (Billboard)	3
US Top Rock Albums (Billboard)	43
