= Bang Bang (Jessie J, Ariana Grande and Nicki Minaj song) =

2014 single by Jessie J, Ariana Grande, and Nicki Minaj

Single by Jessie J, Ariana Grande and Nicki Minaj

from the album Sweet Talker
- Released: 28 July 2014
- Recorded: 2013–2014
- Studio: Metropolis (London, England); Conway (Los Angeles, California); Glenwood Place (Burbank, California)
- Genre: Pop-soul
- Length: 3:19
- Label: Lava; Republic
- Songwriters: Max Martin; Savan Kotecha; Rickard Göransson; Onika Maraj
- Producers: Max Martin; Rickard Göransson; Ilya

Jessie J singles chronology
"Calling All Hearts" (2014)	"Bang Bang" (2014)	"Burnin' Up" (2014)

Ariana Grande singles chronology
"Break Free" (2014)	"Bang Bang" (2014)	"Love Me Harder" (2014)

Nicki Minaj singles chronology
"She Came to Give It to You" (2014)	"Bang Bang" (2014)	"Anaconda" (2014)

Music video
- "Bang Bang" on YouTube

"Bang Bang" is a song by English singer-songwriter Jessie J, American singer-songwriter Ariana Grande, and Trinidadian rapper Nicki Minaj. It was released by Lava and Republic Records on 28 July 2014 as the lead single from Jessie J's third studio album, Sweet Talker (2014). The song was written by Max Martin, Savan Kotecha, Rickard Göransson and Minaj. It was produced by Martin, Göransson, and Ilya, with Kuk Harrell serving as a vocal producer. It is also included on the deluxe version of Grande's second studio album My Everything (2014), serving as the third single from that album.

"Bang Bang" debuted at number six and later peaked at number three on the US Billboard Hot 100. It debuted at number one in the United Kingdom becoming Jessie's third number-one, Grande's second number-one, and Minaj's first number-one single on the chart. The song reached the top ten in multiple other countries including Belgium, Bulgaria, Canada, Denmark, Finland, Ireland, Israel, Netherlands, New Zealand, Scotland, and South Korea. In 2024, "Bang Bang" was certified diamond by the Recording Industry Association of America (RIAA) for selling over 10 million equivalent units in the US, becoming Jessie J's and Grande's first and Minaj's second song to achieve the milestone. It additionally marked the first all-female collaboration in history to be certified diamond. The song has over 1.7 billion streams on Spotify.

The song was positively received for Jessie's and Grande's vocal performances, its production, and Minaj's verse. "Bang Bang" was nominated for Best Pop Duo/Group Performance at the 57th Grammy Awards in 2015 and won Favorite Song of the Year at the 2015 Kids' Choice Awards, as well as Best Collaboration at the 2015 iHeart Radio Music Awards. The song's music video was directed by Hannah Lux Davis and released on 24 August 2014, and has over 2 billion views on YouTube as of July 2024.

== Background ==
The song was written by Savan Kotecha, Max Martin, and Carolina Liar guitarist Rickard Göransson, while the latter two co-produced it with Ilya Salmanzadeh. Minaj added her rap later and received writing credit. Martin had already previously collaborated with Jessie J ("Domino"), Grande ("Problem", "Break Free"), and Minaj ("Va Va Voom", "Masquerade").

The song was originally offered to and recorded by Grande, who did not like the result. Republic Records EVP Wendy Goldstein then sent it to EVP Rob Stevenson who got a demo of the song played to Jessie J, which she decided to record. Following her recording, Republic Records sent it to Minaj to record her verse. Goldstein then sent it to CEO Monte Lipman, who insisted that Grande should listen to it. Grande was impressed, surprised by Jessie J and Minaj also being on the song, and agreed to remain on the song. In a 2025 interview for Tony Gad’s ‘Songs You Know …Stories You Don’t’ podcast, Jessie J stated that she heard Grande’s version and wanted to be on it too, then Minaj was also asked to join. Jessie later said that "It was like a real females, coming together, empowering, supportive [vibe], and then Nicki jumping on it was like the icing on the cake."

On various dates in July 2014, each of the artists uploaded snippets of the song on each of their Instagram profiles: Jessie J on 9 July, Minaj on 23 July, and Grande on 4 July. The song was released as the lead single from Jessie J's third studio album, Sweet Talker (2014), and as the third single of Grande's second studio album, My Everything (2014), appearing on the deluxe version of the latter.

== Composition ==
"Bang Bang"
A 21-second sample of "Bang Bang", featuring Jessie J singing the final pre-chorus and the chorus accompanied by Nicki Minaj rapping.

"Bang Bang" is an up-tempo, "soulful" song, that features a "clap-heavy" production, built over "big bouncy beats and horn blasts". The song mixes pop with Minaj's rap verses making it a hip pop song. The melody of the chorus has been compared to the melody of the first line of "Wake Me Up Before You Go-Go" by Wham!.

== Critical reception ==
Rob Sheffield of Rolling Stone called the song a "perfect Max Martin throwdown" that "fuses Nelly's 'Country Grammar' with Wham!'s 'Wake Me Up Before You Go-Go,' which is some truly twisted pop archaeology." Carolyn Menyes from Music Times called the song "[a] Huge successful hit of Summer 2014" and thought that "[the] song is going straight to the top of the charts." Zach Frydenlund from Complex praised Jessie J's and Ariana's heavenly vocals in the song but concentrated more on Nicki's "catchy killer verse" stating that "it's Nicki who really steals the show with her verse". Jason Lipshutz from Billboard responded positively to the song, saying that the song itself "[is] composed of piercing vocals courtesy of two contemporary crooners, as well as rapid-fire spitting from the hottest female MC on the planet, "Bang Bang" rests tidily upon the Jessie J assertion, "See anybody could be good to you/You need a bad girl to blow your mind."

Vulture's Lindsey Weber thought the song was "no 'Lady Marmalade,'" but praised it saying "it's catchy enough to make a splash." Chris Martins from Spin stated that the song is "powerful", and credits Minaj for the song's noteworthy energy. "What makes the track so big? Well, um, ask Nicki Minaj." He goes on to further praise Minaj's performance on the song, affirming that "The 'Anaconda'-taming MC rips a few mics on the loud and proud pop-soul song." Lewis Corner from Digital Spy gave the song four and a half stars out of five and said that is "one of the year's most electrifying pop anthems."

== Accolades ==
Year	Organization	Award	Result	Ref.
2015	Grammy Awards	Best Pop Duo/Group Performance	Nominated	
2015	iHeartRadio Music Awards	Best Collaboration	Won	
2015	MTV Video Music Awards	Best Collaboration	Nominated	
2015	Nickelodeon Kids' Choice Awards	Song of The Year	Won	
2015	People's Choice Awards	Favorite Song	Nominated	
2015	Teen Choice Awards	Choice Song: Female Artist	Nominated	

== Commercial performance ==
In the United States, "Bang Bang" debuted atop the Billboard Digital Songs chart selling 230,000 digital downloads for the week ending August 3, 2014, becoming Grande's and Minaj's second chart-topper there, and Jessie J's first. The songs first-week sales marked the third largest debut for any song in 2014, behind Grande's own "Problem" which opened with 438,000 downloads on the chart dated May 4, and Taylor Swift's "Shake It Off" which sold 544,000 downloads through the week ending August 24; all three of the aforementioned songs were co-written by Max Martin. The song launched on the US Billboard Hot 100 at number six, marking the second-highest new entry of 2014 on that chart at the time, also behind Grande's "Problem" which started at number three. The song marked Jessie J's second, Grande's third, and Minaj's milestone tenth top ten single in the United States. It also became Grande's second consecutive top ten hit of 2014, following "Problem" which peaked at number two for five consecutive weeks. In its second week on the Hot 100, "Bang Bang" slid down three spots to number nine selling an additional 141,000 digital downloads. Following the release of its music video, "Bang Bang" reached its peak of number three, holding that position for two non-consecutive weeks, being kept off the top spot by Meghan Trainor's "All About That Bass" and Swift's "Shake It Off". Overall, "Bang Bang" spent sixteen consecutive weeks in the Hot 100's top ten, and a total of 31 weeks charting. In May 2024, "Bang Bang" was certified diamond by the RIAA for selling over 10 million equivalent units in the US. It became Jessie J's and Grande's first and Minaj's second song to be certified diamond, and the first all-female collaboration in history to achieve the milestone.

On Billboard's Mainstream Top 40 (Pop Songs) chart, "Bang Bang" debuted at number 19 and later reached a peak of number two, becoming Jessie J's highest-charting hit on mainstream radio since her 2012 single "Domino" also peaked at number two. It additionally became Grande's second-highest peak at the time following "Problem" which topped the chart earlier in the year, while becoming Minaj's third number-two hit there after her collaborations with Justin Bieber on "Beauty and a Beat" and David Guetta on "Turn Me On". Grande and Minaj would later reach the top slot together with "Side to Side" in 2016. On the Streaming Songs chart, "Bang Bang" debuted at number 21 registering three million streams within its first week, eventually reaching the top position on the issue dated 13 September 2014. In Canada, the single peaked at number three on the Canadian Hot 100, equaling "Problem" as Grande's highest peak in the country at the time. The song was certified triple platinum in March 2015 for selling over 240,000 units there.

In the United Kingdom, "Bang Bang" debuted at number one on the UK Singles Chart with 92,000 downloads, becoming Jessie J's third, Grande's second, and Minaj's first number-one single in the country. It consequently became the first song by a lead female rapper to debut at the top spot, and the third song by a female rapper to reach number one overall since Missy Elliott's feature on "I Want You Back" in 1998 and Lil' Kim's feature on "Lady Marmalade" in 2001. The single has since been certified double platinum by the BPI for shipments of over 1.2 million copies in the United Kingdom. On the Irish Singles Chart, the track reached number three. In Australia, "Bang Bang" peaked at number four on the Australian ARIA Charts, Grande's third consecutive top-five single in the nation. It also peaked at number one on the Urban Singles Chart and was certified triple platinum by the Australian Recording Industry Association (ARIA) for shipments of over 210,000 copies. Internationally, the song has also peaked within the top ten of the charts in Belgium, Bulgaria, Canada, Denmark, Finland, Ireland, Israel, Netherlands, New Zealand, Scotland, and South Korea.

== Music video ==
The song's accompanying video was shot over two days in Los Angeles, California, and was directed by Hannah Lux Davis. The video was officially previewed and teased in a Beats by Dr. Dre commercial that aired on 20 August 2014. Following the ad's airing, it was announced that the music video would arrive shortly after the trio's performance at the 2014 MTV Video Music Awards. On 24 August 2014, the official video was uploaded on MTV's website and was available for international viewing. On 25 August 2014, the video was released via Jessie J's Vevo account and was Vevo-certified on 5 November, having surpassed 110 million views. As of July 2024, it has over 2 billion views on YouTube.

== Live performances ==
Jessie J, Ariana Grande, and Nicki Minaj performed the song together at the 2014 MTV Video Music Awards on 24 August 2014, in Inglewood, California, following the performances of Grande's "Break Free" and Minaj's "Anaconda". They sang it at the 2014 American Music Awards on 23 November 2014 in Los Angeles, California.

In November 2014, Grande performed the song with Little Big Town at the 48th Annual Country Music Association Awards. She performed the song by herself at the 2014 Victoria's Secret Fashion Show in London, UK on 9 December 2014 and during her international tour, The Honeymoon Tour. Since the start of the Dangerous Woman Tour, Grande has also sung the song herself. Grande also performed the song with Minaj at the NBA All-Star Game halftime show on 15 February 2015, as well as at the iHeartRadio Music Festival.

Grande and Minaj performed the song in April 2019 at the Coachella Valley Music and Arts Festival despite there being audio problems with Minaj's mic. On 18 April 2020, Jessie J performed the song by herself in One World: Together at Home in her house during the COVID-19 pandemic.

== Other usage ==
- The song was subsequently featured on the main tracklist of the 2014 dance-rhythm video game Just Dance 2015.
- The song has been featured in the short-lived CBS TV drama series Stalker as well as Pitch Perfect 2.
- The song became a recurring joke on the podcast Comedy Bang! Bang! when House of Lies actor Ben Schwartz began singing the song with altered lyrics to be about the show itself.
- In 2018, the song was featured in the "lip sync for the crown" segment of drag queen reality competition RuPaul's Drag Race, where contestants Aquaria, Kameron Michaels and Eureka O'Hara had to lipsync to it in order to win the show's tenth season.
- In October 2019, the song was used by Cadillac in an advertisement for its 2019 XT4 vehicle. A lyric in the song uses the company's name.
- Grammy Award-winning singer Michelle Williams performed the song on the second US series of The Masked Singer as the "Butterfly".
- The song was performed in the seventh episode of the South Korean music reality program Produce 101; the performance became a trending topic on social media with Jessie J sharing its video on her Facebook page. Jessie J's response later made the program's executive producer Han Dong-chul proud in an interview on 10 March 2016, saying: "It's such an honor that the original singer of the song has mentioned our show. And I'm also proud that our contestants performed it so well."

== Formats and track listings ==
- CD single
1. "Bang Bang" – 3:19
2. "Bang Bang" (Jessie J solo version) – 3:11
- Digital download
1. "Bang Bang" – 3:19
- Digital download – Remixes EP
1. "Bang Bang" (Dada Life Remix) – 3:34
2. "Bang Bang" (Kat Krazy Remix) – 3:57
3. "Bang Bang" (3lau Remix) – 3:06
4. "Bang Bang" (Imanos and Gramercy Remix) – 3:44
5. "Bang Bang" (Super Stylers Remix) – 3:33
- Streaming – Remixes
1. "Bang Bang" (Dada Life Remix) – 3:34
2. "Bang Bang" (Kat Krazy Remix) – 3:57
3. "Bang Bang" (3lau Remix) – 3:06
4. "Bang Bang" (Imanos and Gramercy Remix) – 3:44
5. "Bang Bang" (Super Stylers Remix) – 3:33
6. "Bang Bang" (iLL BLU Mix Radio Edit) – 3:44

== Credits and personnel ==
Credits adapted from My Everything deluxe edition liner notes.

=== Recording ===
- Jessie J's vocals recorded at Metropolis Studios (London)
- Ariana Grande's vocals recorded at Conway Recording Studios (Los Angeles, California)
- Nicki Minaj's vocals recorded at Glenwood Place Studios (Burbank, California)
- Mixed at MixStar Studios (Virginia Beach, Virginia)
- Mastered at Sterling Sound (New York City, New York)

=== Management ===
- MXM (administered by Kobalt) (ASCAP) and Harajuku Barbie Music/Money Mack Music/Songs of Universal, Inc. (BMI)
- Nicki Minaj appears courtesy of Young Money Entertainment/Cash Money Records

=== Personnel ===
- Jessie J – lead vocals
- Ariana Grande – lead vocals
- Nicki Minaj – lead vocals, songwriting
- Max Martin – songwriting, production for MXM Productions, programming, keyboards
- Rickard Göransson – songwriting, production for MXM Productions, programming, guitars, bass, keyboards, percussion, background vocals
- Savan Kotecha – songwriting
- Ilya – production for Wolf Cousins Productions, programming, background vocals
- Peter Carlsson – vocal engineering, drums, percussion
- Johan Carlsson – keyboards
- Kuk Harrell – vocal production, vocal engineering for Suga Wuga Music, Inc.
- Jonas Thander – horns
- Joi Gilliam – background vocals
- Taura Stinson – background vocals
- Chonita Gillespie – background vocals
- Paul Norris – vocal production assistant, vocal engineering assistant
- Sam Holland – engineering
- Cory Bice – engineering assistant
- Şerban Ghenea – mixing
- John Hanes – mixing assistant
- Tom Coyne – mastering
- Aya Merrill – mastering

== Charts ==
=== Weekly charts ===
Chart (2014–2016)	Peak position
Australia (ARIA)	4
Australia Urban (ARIA)	1
Austria (Ö3 Austria Top 40)	12
Belgium (Ultratop 50 Flanders)	14
Belgium Urban (Ultratop Flanders)	2
Belgium (Ultratop 50 Wallonia)	28
Canada Hot 100 (Billboard)	3
Canada AC (Billboard)	10
Canada CHR/Top 40 (Billboard)	5
Canada Hot AC (Billboard)	3
CIS Airplay (TopHit)	144
Czech Republic Airplay (ČNS IFPI)	40
Czech Republic Singles Digital (ČNS IFPI)	5
Denmark (Tracklisten)	10
Euro Digital Song Sales (Billboard)	1
Finland (Suomen virallinen lista)	12
France (SNEP)	47
France Airplay (SNEP)	6
Germany (GfK)	13
Greece Digital Songs (Billboard)	6
Hungary (Single Top 40)	20
Hungary (Stream Top 40)	10
Ireland (IRMA)	3
Israel International Airplay (Media Forest)	7
Italy (FIMI)	24
Japan (Japan Hot 100)	40
Mexico (Billboard Mexican Airplay)	45
Mexico Anglo (Monitor Latino)	13
Netherlands (Dutch Top 40)	6
Netherlands (Single Top 100)	7
New Zealand (Recorded Music NZ)	4
Norway (VG-lista)	15
Romania (Airplay 100)	40
Scottish Singles Sales (Official Charts)	1
Slovakia Airplay (ČNS IFPI)	31
Slovakia Singles Digital (ČNS IFPI)	7
South Korea (Gaon)	34
Spain (Promusicae)	11
Sweden (Sverigetopplistan)	15
Switzerland (Schweizer Hitparade)	21
UK Singles (Official Charts)	1
US Billboard Hot 100	3
US Adult Contemporary (Billboard)	25
US Adult Pop Airplay (Billboard)	6
US Dance Club Songs (Billboard)	22
US Dance Airplay (Billboard)	5
US Pop Airplay (Billboard)	2
US Rhythmic Airplay (Billboard)	14
Venezuela (Record Report)	91

=== Year-end charts ===
Chart (2014)	Position
Australia (ARIA)	30
Belgium Urban (Ultratop Flanders)	18
Canada (Canadian Hot 100)	30
France (SNEP)	43
Germany (Official German Charts)	80
Italy (FIMI)	93
Netherlands (Dutch Top 40)	38
Netherlands (Single Top 100)	25
New Zealand (Recorded Music NZ)	25
South Korea International Chart (GAON)	80
Sweden (Sverigetopplistan)	72
UK Singles (Official Charts Company)	25
Taiwan (Hito Radio)	69
US Billboard Hot 100	27
US Adult Top 40 (Billboard)	50
US Mainstream Top 40 (Billboard)	24
Chart (2015)	Position
Belgium Urban (Ultratop Flanders)	32
Canada (Canadian Hot 100)	70
Italy (FIMI)	87
Netherlands (Single Top 100)	87
South Korea International Chart (GAON)	18
Spain (PROMUSICAE)	77
UK Singles (Official Charts Company)	91
US Billboard Hot 100	80
Chart (2016)	Position
South Korea International Chart (GAON)	4
Chart (2017)	Position
South Korea International Chart (GAON)	38

== Certifications and sales ==
Region	Certification	Certified units/sales
Australia (ARIA)	5× Platinum	350,000^{‡}
Brazil (Pro-Música Brasil)	3× Diamond	750,000^{‡}
Canada (Music Canada)	6× Platinum	480,000^{‡}
Germany (BVMI)	Platinum	400,000^{‡}
Hungary (MAHASZ)	Gold	1,500^{‡}
Italy (FIMI)	2× Platinum	100,000^{‡}
Japan (RIAJ)	Gold	100,000^{*}
New Zealand (RMNZ)	5× Platinum	150,000^{‡}
Norway (IFPI Norway)	4× Platinum	240,000^{‡}
Poland (ZPAV)	4× Platinum	200,000^{‡}
Portugal (AFP)	Platinum	20,000^{‡}
South Korea (Gaon)	—	1,347,010
Spain (Promusicae)	2× Platinum	120,000^{‡}
Sweden (GLF)	4× Platinum	160,000^{‡}
United Kingdom (BPI)	4× Platinum	2,400,000^{‡}
United States (RIAA)	Diamond	10,000,000^{‡}
Streaming
Denmark (IFPI Danmark)	Platinum	2,600,000^{†}
Japan (RIAJ)	Gold	50,000,000^{†}
Spain (Promusicae)	Platinum	8,000,000^{†}
^{*} Sales figures based on certification alone.^{‡} Sales+streaming figures based on certification alone.^{†} Streaming-only figures based on certification alone.

== Release history ==
"Bang Bang" release history
Region	Date	Format(s)	Label(s)	Ref.
United States	28 July 2014	Hot adult contemporary radio	Republic	
United States	29 July 2014	Contemporary hit radio; rhythmic contemporary radio	Republic	
United States	29 July 2014	Digital download	Lava; Republic	
Germany	22 August 2014	Digital download	Lava; Republic	
Italy	29 August 2014	Radio airplay	Universal	
Ireland	19 September 2014	Digital download	Lava; Republic	
United Kingdom	21 September 2014	Digital download	Lava; Republic	
Germany	26 September 2014	CD	Lava; Republic	

== See also ==
- List of best-selling singles in the United States
