= Break Free (song) =

2014 single by Ariana Grande featuring Zedd

Single by Ariana Grande featuring Zedd

from the album My Everything
- B-side: "Break Your Heart Right Back"
- Released: July 2, 2014
- Recorded: 2013
- Studio: Conway Recording Studios: (Los Angeles, California); Zedd1 Studio; (Santa Monica, California)
- Genre: EDM; synth-pop
- Length: 3:34
- Label: Republic
- Songwriters: Anton Zaslavski; Max Martin; Savan Kotecha
- Producers: Zedd; Max Martin

Ariana Grande singles chronology
"Problem" (2014)	"Break Free" (2014)	"Bang Bang" (2014)

Zedd singles chronology
"Find You" (2014)	"Break Free" (2014)	"I Want You to Know" (2015)

Music video
- "Break Free" on YouTube

Alternative cover

"Break Free" is a song by American singer and songwriter Ariana Grande, featuring German music producer Zedd. It was released by Republic Records on July 2, 2014, as the second single from Grande's second studio album, My Everything (2014). It was written by Savan Kotecha and its producers Zedd and Max Martin. Musically, the song explores the EDM genre, a musical departure for Grande, whose discography is primarily composed of pop and R&B.

"Break Free" peaked at number four on the US Billboard Hot 100, becoming Grande's third consecutive top-ten from My Everything after "Problem" and "Bang Bang", and her fourth overall. Similarly, "Break Free" hit number three on the Australian ARIA Charts, and number five on the Canadian Hot 100 and the New Zealand Singles Chart. Overall, the song attained top-ten peaks in multiple countries including Austria, Czech Republic, Finland, Ireland, the Netherlands, Norway, Poland, Slovakia, and Sweden, as well as reaching the top twenty in Belgium, Denmark, Germany, Italy, Japan, Poland, Scotland, South Korea, Spain, Switzerland, and the United Kingdom.

The song has been certified quintiple platinum by the Recording Industry Association of America (RIAA) and has sold over 1.9 million copies in the United States as of 2020, making it Grande's seventh single to have sold over a million. Its music video was directed by Chris Marrs Piliero and pays homage to science fiction films, and has received over 1.2 billion views on YouTube as of 2026. "Break Free" also marked a milestone in Grande's career, as it entered the top ten on the Billboard Hot 100 the same week "Problem" and "Bang Bang" were charting. Consequently, she became the second lead female artist in chart history to simultaneously hold three positions in the top ten on the Hot 100 after Adele.

== Production and composition ==
"Break Free"
A 22-second sample of the song, featuring Grande singing over an electronic trance beat, a musical departure from her previous singles.

"Break Free" was written by Savan Kotecha and its producers Zedd and Max Martin. The song was originally intended for Austin Mahone, however the recording never materialized due to conflicting schedules as Mahone was working on his 2013 single "Say Somethin". In a May 2014 interview during which he talked about "Break Free", Zedd spoke about wanting to collaborate with Grande after hearing her voice for the first time at a Universal showcase event where she sang live. He said, "I was backstage and I heard someone sing. And I didn't know who it was, and I just said 'I want to make a song with whoever is singing right now.' I didn't know who it was, and it turned out to be her. And luckily, now there's a song!"

"Break Free" is an EDM and electro track, a departure from Grande's typically pop and R&B music. She first spoke about collaborating on a song with Zedd in late April in an interview with Billboard, where she described the song as "fantastic and super experimental for me" and further stated, "I never thought I'd do an EDM song, but that was an eye-opening experience, and now all I want to do is dance." Grande later talked about the song at Wango Tango and shared that she wanted it to be the next single.

According to the sheet music published at Musicnotes.com by Kobalt Music Services America, "Break Free" is written in the key of G minor with vocals spanning from G_{3} to B♭_{5}. The song features two grammatically incorrect lines, "Now that I've become who I really are" and "I only wanna die alive". Grande told Time magazine that she disagreed with Martin and refused to sing grammatically incorrect lyrics, but Martin urged her to do so because "It's funny". This usage would ten years later be compared with Sabrina Carpenter's song "Espresso" and its line "That's that me espresso".

== Release ==
On May 10, 2014, during an interview after her performance at Wango Tango, Grande revealed that she wanted "Break Free" to be her next single after "Problem". She said, "I did a song with Zedd, who I just met for the first time here, and I'm really excited about that song. I really want that to be the second single. My whole team is like, 'Oh it's too early to pick a new single,' but I'm really leaning towards that one. I love that song so much. He's fantastic and the song is really fun."

Grande began dropping hints about her second single on social media throughout the month of June but did not confirm that it was her Zedd collaboration until June 21, at which point she also revealed the song's name on Twitter. To build hype, Grande started an online countdown for the ten days leading up to "Break Free's" release. On June 28, Grande uploaded a teaser video with a snippet of the song to her Instagram account.

"Break Free" premiered on the one-day revival of the MTV show Total Request Live in a half-hour special titled Total Ariana Live on July 2, 2014. It was made available for purchase as a digital download on iTunes a few hours after the TRL premiere. It reached the number one spot on the iTunes Sales Chart soon after its release.

== Critical reception ==
Lewis Corner from Digital Spy gave the song four stars out of five and said that the track is "too catchy to be generic". Larry Fitzmaurice from Pitchfork also liked the song praising both the production part of the song and the vocal saying that, "from the zippy opening synth line to the verse's insistent pounding, 'Break Free' certainly invites comparisons to Swedish pop mastermind Robyn; as ever, Grande brings her own skyscraping voice in top form, so vocally the comparisons don't stick." He compared the message of the song to Kelly Clarkson's "Since U Been Gone".

"Break Free" was nominated at the 2014 Teen Choice Awards in the Break-Up Song category. It was also nominated for Top Dance/Electronic Song at the 2015 Billboard Music Awards.

== Accolades ==
Year	Organization	Award	Result	Ref.
2014	Teen Choice Awards	Choice Break-Up Song	Nominated	
2015	Billboard Music Awards	Top Dance/Electronic Song	Nominated	
2015	Telehit Awards	Most Popular Video in Telehit	Nominated	

== Commercial performance ==
In the United States, "Break Free" debuted at number 15 on the Billboard Hot 100 with 161,000 digital downloads sold within its first week, entering the Digital Songs chart at number five, for the issues dated July 10, 2014. Following the release of the song's official music video on August 12, "Break Free" soared from number 18 to number four on the Hot 100, becoming Grande's fourth career top-ten single and her third consecutive top-ten of 2014. The same week, Grande's other My Everything singles, "Bang Bang" and "Problem" were also charting within the Billboard Hot 100 top ten, placing at numbers ten and seven, respectively. With three songs in the top ten simultaneously, Grande became the second female lead artist in history to have three concurrent singles in the top ten since Adele did so in 2012. Additionally, "Break Free" jumped from number 14 to four on the Billboard Digital Songs charts with 116,000 digital downloads sold that week, along with "Bang Bang" and the promotional single "Best Mistake" (featuring Big Sean) ranking at numbers two and six, respectively. Consequently, Grande became the first female artist in history to have three songs placing in the top six of the Billboard Digital Songs chart simultaneously, and the second overall artist since Michael Jackson did so following his death in 2009. "Break Free" marked Zedd's second top-ten entry, as well as his highest-peaking single to date in the United States as of 2025. On the Dance Club Songs, the track reached a peak of number three, while topping the Dance/Electronic Songs chart for nine weeks, becoming Grande's and Zedd's first number one in the latter. The song has sold 1.9 million copies in the nation as of June 2020.

Internationally, the song also reached the top ten in Australia, Austria, Canada, Finland, Ireland, Netherlands, New Zealand, Poland, and Sweden.

== Impact ==
Due to its catchiness and lyricism, the song went on to become a gay anthem.

In March 2022, "Break Free" has received attention in the Philippines during a campaign rally for presidential candidate, Vice President Leni Robredo and her running mate, Sen. Kiko Pangilinan. A video of the crowd singing "Break Free" went viral, catching the attention of Grande herself. Grande posted the video on Instagram, stating "I could not believe this was real. I love you more than words". An estimated 137,000 people attended the rally.

== Music video ==
Grande is seen removing clothing while floating in zero gravity, paying homage to the opening scene of the 1968 sci-fi film Barbarella.

The music video was filmed from June 10–12, 2014. It was directed by Chris Marrs Piliero. Having an intergalactic theme, Grande stated that the video was inspired by the 1968 sci-fi film Barbarella, the Star Wars series and space in general. The plot consists of Grande on a fictional planet renouncing her allegiance to an evil regime of extraterrestrials and freeing a group of prisoners from their cages. She subsequently attacks a giant robot using missiles, but the robot manages to release its hand to catch her, bringing her to the planet's overlord. She succeeds in defeating the villain, and the clip ends with Grande and the prisoners she rescued flying away in a spaceship, partying with the crew, as Beats by Dre products are visible in the scene. The song's producer Zedd makes an appearance.

It premiered on YouTube on August 12, 2014. It surpassed 100 million views on October 5, making it Grande's third Vevo-certified music video after "The Way" and "Problem". It made its televised debut three days later on Disney Channel during its original movie How to Build a Better Boy. As of August 2025, the video has received over 1.2 billion views on YouTube.

== Live performances ==
Grande first performed at the "IHeartRadio Theater at the L.A Honda Stage" on August 22, 2014. She performs the song for the second time at the 31st annual MTV Video Music Awards on August 24, 2014. She then went on to perform it on several television shows, including America's Got Talent on August 27, on Today on August 29, and on The X Factor Australia on September 8. She also performed it at the iHeartRadio Music Festival on September 19. She performed a half acoustic, half upbeat version of "Break Free" on Saturday Night Live on September 27, 2014. Grande once again performed "Break Free" at the 2014 MTV Europe Music Awards on November 9, 2014, opening up the show along with her other single "Problem". Grande performed the song at the American Music Awards on November 23, 2014. "Break Free" was part of Grande's set list for the Honeymoon Tour, the Dangerous Woman Tour and One Love Manchester, a benefit concert held on June 4, 2017, for the victims of the Manchester Arena bombing.

The song was also performed at Grande's Sweetener World Tour on all dates from March 18 to November 22, 2019, before it was removed. She has also performed the song at The Eternal Sunshine Tour in 2026.

== Uses in other media ==
The song was featured in various video games, like Just Dance 2015 and Samba de Amigo: Party Central. The song was featured in the video game Grand Theft Auto VI in the radio station Flash FM.

The song was also used in The Voice media franchise, including a video game based on the show and the episode, "The Blind Auditions, Part 5".

Other appearances include the series premiere of The Good Place "Everything Is Fine" and The Detour episode "The Tournament". It was also featured in the season six of Glee, "Child Star", performed by Lea Michele, Josie Totah, Dot-Marie Jones, Jane Lynch, Matthew Morrison, and Chord Overstreet as their characters Rachel Berry, Myron Muskovitz, Sheldon Beiste, Sue Sylvester, Will Schuester, and Sam Evans. A small portion of the lyrics is changed for an unknown reason.

Dakota Lotus, Olivia Sanabia and Ruby Rose Turner performs "Break Free" in the Coop & Cami Ask the World episode, "Would You Wrather Turn 13?" as their respective roles, Coop Wrather, Charlotte Wrather and Cami Wrather, after Ariana Grande fails to show up at Cami's birthday party. The episode aired during the COVID-19 pandemic. Reese Witherspoon and Nick Kroll performed "Break Free" in the 2021 film, Sing 2 as their respective roles, Rosita and Gunter.

The song was also featured in the 2019 Max Martin jukebox musical & Juliet. The song appears in Act 1, where it is performed by Angelique and Lance. The contestants who reached the final of Dream Academy performed the song in the penultimate episode.

== Credits and personnel ==
Credits adapted from My Everything liner notes.

Recording and management

- Recorded at Conway Recording Studios (Los Angeles, California) and Zedd1 Studio (Santa Monica, California)
- Mastered at Sterling Sound (New York City, New York)
- Zedd Music Empire (ASCAP), all rights administered by Kobalt Songs Music Publishing, MXM (administered by Kobalt) (ASCAP), MXM (administered by Kobalt (ASCAP)

Personnel

- Ariana Grande – lead vocals, background vocals
- Zedd – songwriting, production, programming, instruments, mixing
- Max Martin – songwriting, production for MXM Productions
- Savan Kotecha – songwriting
- Ryan Shanahan – engineering
- Jesse Taub – engineering
- Sam Holland – engineering
- Cory Bice – engineering
- Tom Coyne – mastering
- Aya Merrill – mastering

== Charts ==
=== Weekly charts ===
Chart (2014–2017)	Peak position
Australia (ARIA)	3
Australia Dance (ARIA)	1
Austria (Ö3 Austria Top 40)	5
Belgium (Ultratop 50 Flanders)	17
Belgium Dance (Ultratop Flanders)	13
Belgium (Ultratop 50 Wallonia)	17
Belgium Dance (Ultratop Wallonia)	2
Brazil (Billboard Brasil Hot 100)	81
Canada Hot 100 (Billboard)	5
Canada AC (Billboard)	29
Canada CHR/Top 40 (Billboard)	3
Canada Hot AC (Billboard)	10
Czech Republic Airplay (ČNS IFPI)	30
Czech Republic Singles Digital (ČNS IFPI)	3
Denmark (Tracklisten)	19
Euro Digital Song Sales (Billboard)	12
Finland (Suomen virallinen lista)	4
France (SNEP)	27
France Airplay (SNEP)	8
Germany (GfK)	12
Hong Kong (HKRIA)	13
Hungary (Editors' Choice Top 40)	36
Hungary (Stream Top 40)	10
Ireland (IRMA)	9
Italy (FIMI)	16
Japan (Japan Hot 100)	19
Mexico (Billboard Mexican Airplay)	17
Mexico Anglo (Monitor Latino)	10
Netherlands (Dutch Top 40)	3
Netherlands (Single Top 100)	6
New Zealand (Recorded Music NZ)	5
Norway (VG-lista)	4
Poland Airplay (ZPAV)	9
Poland Dance (ZPAV)	19
Scottish Singles Sales (Official Charts)	12
Slovakia Airplay (ČNS IFPI)	21
Slovakia Singles Digital (ČNS IFPI)	3
Slovenia (SloTop50)	49
South Korea International Chart (GAON)	12
Spain (Promusicae)	9
Sweden (Sverigetopplistan)	6
Switzerland (Schweizer Hitparade)	15
UK Singles (Official Charts)	16
US Billboard Hot 100	4
US Adult Contemporary (Billboard)	26
US Adult Pop Airplay (Billboard)	23
US Dance Club Songs (Billboard)	3
US Hot Dance/Electronic Songs (Billboard)	1
US Latin Pop Airplay (Billboard)	39
US Pop Airplay (Billboard)	4
US Rhythmic Airplay (Billboard)	15
Venezuela (Record Report)	78

=== Year-end charts ===
Chart (2014)	Position
Australia (ARIA)	39
Austria (Ö3 Austria Top 40)	71
Belgium (Ultratop 50 Flanders)	96
Belgium Dance (Ultratop Flanders)	55
Belgium Dance (Ultratop Wallonia)	30
Canada (Canadian Hot 100)	33
France (SNEP)	139
Germany (Official German Charts)	84
Italy (FIMI)	61
Japan (Japan Hot 100)	72
Japan Adult Contemporary (Billboard)	13
Netherlands (Dutch Top 40)	19
Netherlands (Single Top 100)	21
Sweden (Sverigetopplistan)	32
UK Singles (OCC)	86
US Billboard Hot 100	37
US Hot Dance/Electronic Songs (Billboard)	6
US Mainstream Top 40 (Billboard)	26

Chart (2015)	Position
Japan (Japan Hot 100)	61
Spain (PROMUSICAE)	89
US Hot Dance/Electronic Songs (Billboard)	13

Chart (2016)	Position
Japan (Japan Hot 100)	61

Chart (2017)	Position
Japan Streaming Songs (Billboard Japan)	34

=== Decade-end charts ===
Chart (2013–2019)	Position
US Hot Dance/Electronic Songs (Billboard)	20

== Certifications ==
Region	Certification	Certified units/sales
Australia (ARIA)	6× Platinum	420,000^{‡}
Austria (IFPI Austria)	Platinum	30,000^{*}
Brazil (Pro-Música Brasil)	Diamond	250,000^{‡}
Canada (Music Canada)	5× Platinum	400,000^{‡}
Denmark (IFPI Danmark)	2× Platinum	180,000^{‡}
Germany (BVMI)	Platinum	400,000^{‡}
Italy (FIMI)	2× Platinum	100,000^{‡}
Japan (RIAJ)	Platinum	250,000^{*}
Netherlands (NVPI)	2× Platinum	60,000^{^}
New Zealand (RMNZ)	3× Platinum	90,000^{‡}
Norway (IFPI Norway)	4× Platinum	240,000^{‡}
Portugal (AFP)	Gold	5,000^{‡}
Spain (Promusicae)	Platinum	40,000^{‡}
Sweden (GLF)	4× Platinum	160,000^{‡}
Switzerland (IFPI Switzerland)	Gold	15,000^{‡}
United Kingdom (BPI)	2× Platinum	1,200,000^{‡}
United States (RIAA)	5× Platinum	5,000,000^{‡}
Streaming
Denmark (IFPI Danmark)	Platinum	2,600,000^{†}
Japan (RIAJ)	Platinum	100,000,000^{†}
Spain (Promusicae)	Platinum	8,000,000^{†}
^{*} Sales figures based on certification alone.^{^} Shipments figures based on certification alone.^{‡} Sales+streaming figures based on certification alone.^{†} Streaming-only figures based on certification alone.

== Release history ==
"Break Free" release history
Region	Date	Format(s)	Label	Ref.
United States	July 3, 2014	Digital download	Republic	
France	July 4, 2014	Digital download	Republic	
Italy	July 4, 2014	Digital download	Republic	
Japan	July 4, 2014	Digital download	Republic	
United States	July 8, 2014	Contemporary hit radio; rhythmic contemporary radio	Republic	
United Kingdom	August 6, 2014	Digital download	Republic	
Italy	September 26, 2014	Radio airplay	Universal	
Various	December 6, 2024	7-inch vinyl	Republic	
