= Swinton Insurance =

British insurance company

Swinton Group Ltd
- Type: Subsidiary
- Industry: Insurance
- Founded: 1957; 69 years ago
- Founder: Ken Scowcroft
- Headquarters: Embankment West Tower, 101 Cathedral Approach, Salford M3 7FB, United Kingdom
- Products: Home insurance, motor insurance, business insurance, caravan insurance, bike insurance, van insurance, taxi insurance
- Owner: Markerstudy Group
- Number of employees: More than 1,500
- Website: swinton.co.uk

Swinton Insurance Ltd is a UK insurance retailer that was established in 1957. The company offers a range of insurance products from a panel of UK insurers covering car, bike, home, commercial, taxi and caravan insurance.

== History ==
Swinton was founded in 1957 by Ken Scowcroft (born 1928) who began the car insurance brokerage business from the front room of his semi-detached house in Swinton, Greater Manchester. In the first year, he sold around 100 policies to local people.

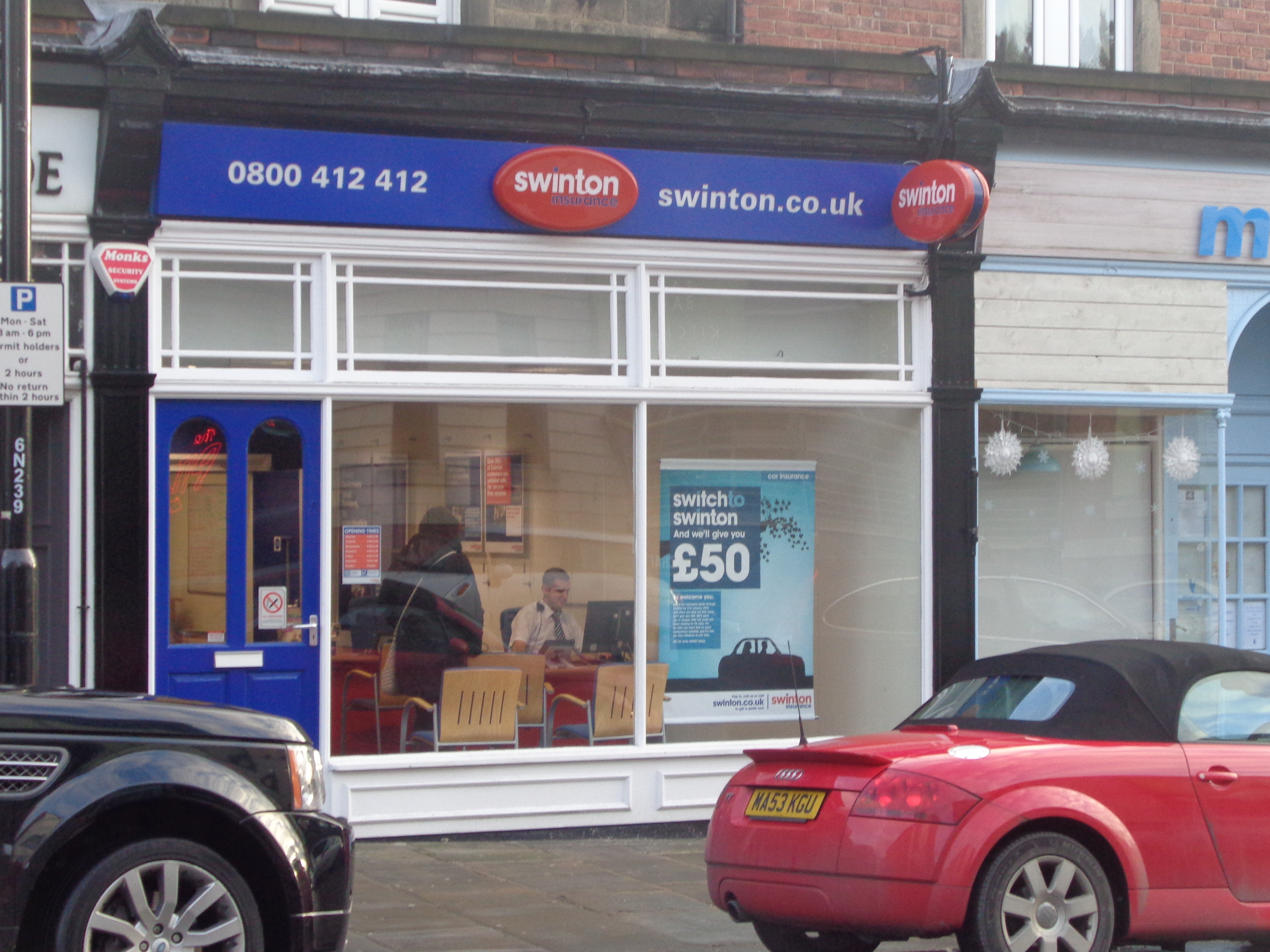
Branch in Headingley, Leeds (now closed)

The first branch was opened in 1964 in Salford, and the branch network originally expanded in the Manchester region before it expanded throughout the North West of England. It was then merged with Denbury Insurance owned by Brian Blake, retaining the Swinton Insurance name. The company became the first insurance franchise and the first to introduce a computer quotations system, which is now common in major UK insurers. In 1981, Ken Scowcroft's son, Brian Scowcroft, joined the business and worked in a number of different roles including Finance Director before being appointed Joint Chief Executive in 1985.

In 1988 Swinton was sold to Sun Alliance for £130m and in 2001 it changed hands again when it was acquired by MMA Holdings UK Plc., which is, in turn, owned by Covéa SGAM (Société de Groupe d'Assurance Mutuelle).

In 2002, The Swinton Insurance Group acquired the specialist caravan and motorhome insurer, Safeguard, and in 2004, it acquired Manchester-based insurance group Deansgate Insurance.

By 2008, Swinton had become the third largest insurance retailer in the UK, and the largest in Northern Ireland, managing over three million individual car, home and life insurance policies. Their position in the Northern Ireland market was further bolstered with the acquisition of Open + Direct in 2009.

The Swinton Insurance Group continued their UK-wide acquisition strategy in 2012 with the purchase of Greys Insurance in Burnley. In 2013, they then purchased Stroud based insurers Alexander James Commercial before agreeing a deal to buy the general insurance book of North Wales-based Anderson Insurance Services in 2014 and the Cleethorpes based C H Turner Insurance Consultants.

Chief Executive Christophe Bardet stepped down at the end of December 2014 and was succeeded by Gilles Normand, formerly the CEO of MMA Holdings UK Plc. Gilles Normand stepped down as CEO in October 2018 and was replaced by Scott Kennedy as Managing Director.

The Ardonagh Group purchased Swinton in September 2018 for £165million.

== Advertising ==
Swinton Insurance was the first insurance broker to advertise on UK television in the 1960s. In the 1980s, Swinton ran television commercials featuring a 'Man with Big Glasses'.

In the 1990s, Swinton Insurance ran a television commercial campaign featuring characters from the television programme Thunderbirds.

Other commercials have featured Emmerdale actor John Middleton and the animated television characters of The Flintstones.

== Controversy ==
In 2009, Swinton was fined £770,000 by the Financial Services Authority (FSA) for mis-selling payment protection insurance (PPI) policies. In July 2013, Swinton was fined £7.4m by the Financial Conduct Authority (FCA) in relation to sales of monthly insurance products sold by telephone between April 2010 and April 2012.

Chief Executive Christophe Bardet stated that Swinton had notified these problems to the Financial Services Authority in March 2012 and co-operated fully with the FCA. Swinton acknowledged its shortcomings in its sales practices during the specific period in question, and the company unreservedly apologised to customers. After instigating a full review of the business after his appointment in December 2011, Bardet announced a comprehensive transformation of the business with a three-year, £75m investment programme.

In May 2014, Swinton Insurance was criticised by Welsh Language Commissioner Meri Huws for banning call centre staff from using Welsh when discussing details of financial products with Welsh-speaking customers in Wales.
