= Tobias Karlsson (songwriter) =

Swedish songwriter and record producer

- Birth name: Erik Tobias Karlsson
- Born: Sweden
- Genres: Pop, rock, electronic
- Occupation(s): Songwriter, record producer
- Years active: 1999–present

Erik Tobias Karlsson is a Swedish songwriter and record producer based in Los Angeles. He has worked with artists such as Halsey, Adam Lambert, Joji, Carolina Liar, James Blunt, Anouk, Linkin Park, Skillet, Kris Allen, Infinite Mass, Pauline Kamusewu and Handoffmaestro.

He founded the publishing and production company Monza Publishing together with Andreas Håkansson and Fredrik Svalstedt in 2003.

Tobias is signed to Max Martin's company MXM as a songwriter and music producer.

== Selected work ==
Year	Artist	Album	Song	Details
2000	Smile	Future Girls	Dancing All Alone (single)	Co-writer
2002	Sam	Being Under the Influence	Mr. President (single)	Co-writer, producer
2002	Sam	Being Under the Influence	Big Tits (single)	Producer
2002	Sam	Being Under the Influence	I do	Co-writer, producer
2002	Sam	Being Under the Influence	Spectator Game	Co-writer, producer
2002	Sam	Being Under the Influence	Alright	Co-writer, producer
2002	Sam	Being Under the Influence	Brainwashed	Producer
2002	Sam	Being Under the Influence	Time	Producer
2003	Pauline	Candy Rain	Candy rain	Co-writer, producer
2003	Pauline	Candy Rain	Runnin' Out of Gaz (single)	Co-writer, producer
2003	Pauline	Candy Rain	Babylon (single)	Co-writer, producer
2003	Pauline	Candy Rain	Answer (single)	Co-writer, producer
2003	Pauline	Candy Rain	I Did Nothing Wrong	Co-writer, producer
2003	Pauline	Candy Rain	Nothing Back	Co-writer, producer
2003	Pauline	Candy Rain	24 Fine Hours	Co-writer, producer
2003	Pauline	Candy Rain	Are You Feeling Better	Co-writer, producer
2003	Pauline	Candy Rain	That's What I Am	Co-writer, producer
2003	Pauline	Candy Rain	Doubts	Co-writer, producer
2003	Pauline	Candy Rain	Zitchie	Co-writer, producer
2004	Infinite Mass	1991	The Thief (single)	Co-writer, producer
2004	Infinite Mass	1991	Let's Go	Co-writer, producer
2004	Infinite Mass	1991	No. 1 Swartskalle (single)	Co-writer, producer
2004	Infinite Mass	1991	Fire Fire (single)	Co-writer, producer
2004	Infinite Mass	1991	Bad Boy	Producer
2004	Infinite Mass	1991	Don't You Worry	Co-writer, producer
2004	Infinite Mass	1991	La La Song	Co-writer, producer
2004	Infinite Mass	1991	So High	Co-writer, producer
2004	Infinite Mass	1991	I Don't Care	Co-writer, producer
2004	Infinite Mass	1991	The Deal	Co-writer, producer
2004	Sam and Mark		The Sun Has Come Your Way (single)	Co-writer
2005	The Sunshine	Love	Sabotage (single)	Writer, producer
2005	The Sunshine	Love	Simon le Bon	Writer, producer
2005	The Sunshine	Love	She's My Television (single)	Writer, producer
2005	The Sunshine	Love	C'mon Yeah	Co-producer
2005	The Sunshine	Love	Love	Writer, producer
2005	The Sunshine	Love	Saturday Night	Co-producer
2005	The Sunshine	Love	Jesus United	Co-producer
2005	The Sunshine	Love	I Get Around	Co-producer
2005	The Sunshine	Love	Strap Hanger Girl	Co-producer
2005	The Sunshine	Love	Beat It	Writer, producer
2005	Shirley Clamp		Lite Som Du (single)	Writer, producer
2005	Camilla Brinck		Jenny (single)	Writer, producer
2006	Linda Sundblad	Oh My God!	Cheat	Co-writer, producer
2006	Linda Sundblad	Oh My God!	Oh Father (single)	Co-writer, producer
2006	Linda Sundblad	Oh My God!	Pretty Rebels	Co-writer, producer
2006	Linda Sundblad	Oh My God!	Lose You (single)	Co-writer, producer
2006	Linda Sundblad	Oh My God!	Back In Time	Co-writer, producer
2006	Linda Sundblad	Oh My God!	Who (Q-boy)	Producer
2006	Linda Sundblad	Oh My God!	Dirty	Co-writer, producer
2006	Linda Sundblad	Oh My God!	Beautiful Boys	Co-writer, producer
2006	Linda Sundblad	Oh My God!	Keeper	Co-writer, producer
2006	Linda Sundblad	Oh My God!	Daises	Co-writer, producer
2006	Rigo	Soundclash	Hustler	Co-writer, producer
2006	Rigo	Soundclash	Oh Ay	Co-writer, producer
2006	Rigo	Soundclash	Cool (single, ft. Pauline)	Co-writer, producer
2006	Rigo	Soundclash	She's a Pro (single)	Co-writer, producer
2006	Rigo	Soundclash	Vamos a Bailar (single)	Co-writer, producer
2006	Rigo	Soundclash	I Wanna Be Your Friend	Co-writer, producer
2006	Rigo	Soundclash	Say, Say, Say (single)	Co-writer, producer
2008	Hoffmaestro	The Storm	Young Dad (single)	Co-writer, producer
2008	Carolina Liar	Coming To Terms	I'm Not Over (single)	Co-writer, co-producer
2008	Carolina Liar	Coming To Terms	Coming To Terms	Co-writer, co-producer
2008	Carolina Liar	Coming To Terms	Last Night	Co-writer, co-producer
2008	Carolina Liar	Coming To Terms	Show Me What I'm Looking For (single)	Co-writer, co-producer
2008	Carolina Liar	Coming To Terms	Simple Life	Co-writer, co-producer
2008	Carolina Liar	Coming To Terms	California Bound	Co-writer, co-producer
2008	Carolina Liar	Coming To Terms	Done Stealin'	Co-writer, co-producer
2008	Carolina Liar	Coming To Terms	Beautiful World	Co-writer, co-producer
2008	Carolina Liar	Coming To Terms	Better Alone	Co-writer, co-producer
2009	Rigo		I Got You (single)	Co-writer, co-producer
2009	Frida		Gasen i Botten (single, ft Mange)	Co-writer, co-producer
2009	Frida		Festa Hela Natten (single)	Co-writer, co-producer
2009	Crosby Loggins	Time To Move	Time To Move	Co-writer, co-producer
2009	Chloe Temtchine	Between Day And Dream	Hotter Than Sunshine	Co-writer, co-producer
2009	Kris Allen	Kris Allen	Let It Rain	Co-writer, producer
2009	Sofi Bonde		See Through (single)	Co-writer, producer
2009	Sofi Bonde		Shade of Gray (single)	Co-writer, producer
2009	Sofi Bonde		Out of Space	Co-writer, producer
2010	The Edges		Sinking Ship	Co-writer, producer
2010	Diana Vickers	Songs From The Tainted Cherry Tree	My Hip	Co-writer, co-producer
2011	Carolina Liar	Wild Blessed Freedom		
2011	Carolina Liar	Wild Blessed Freedom	Drown (single)	Co-writer, producer
2011	Carolina Liar	Wild Blessed Freedom	All That Comes Out of My Mouth	Co-writer, co-producer
2011	Carolina Liar	Wild Blessed Freedom	Daddy's little girl	Co-writer, producer
2011	Carolina Liar	Wild Blessed Freedom	Feel Better Now	Co-producer
2011	Carolina Liar	Wild Blessed Freedom	I Don't Think So	Co-producer
2011	Carolina Liar	Wild Blessed Freedom	King of broken hearts	Co-writer, co-producer
2011	Carolina Liar	Wild Blessed Freedom	Miss America	Co-writer, producer
2011	Carolina Liar	Wild Blessed Freedom	Never let you down	Co-writer, producer
2014	Trijntje Oosterhuis	Walk Along	"Walk Along" (single)	Co-writer, producer
2014	Nicky Romero & Anouk	Paradise and Back Again	Feet on the Ground (single)	Co-writer, co-producer
2014	Anouk	Paradise and Back Again	Places to Go (single)	Co-writer, producer
2015	Adam Lambert	The Original High	Ghost Town (single)	Co-writer, co-producer
2015	Adam Lambert	The Original High	Shame	Co-writer, producer
2015	Adam Lambert	The Original High	These Boys	Co-writer, producer
2015	Tor Miller	Carter & Cash	Carter & Cash (single)	Co-writer, co-producer
2015	The Vamps	Wake Up	Held By Me	Producer
2016	Anouk	Queen For a Day	Run Away Together (single)	Co-writer, producer
2016	Anouk	Queen For a Day	Not A Lovesong	Co-writer, producer
2016	Anouk	Queen For a Day	New Day (single)	Co-writer, producer
2016	Anouk	Queen For a Day	If I Knew	Co-writer, producer
2016	Anouk	Queen For a Day	Dirty Girl	Co-writer, producer
2016	Anouk	Queen For a Day	Wanna Little Something	Co-writer, producer
2016	Anouk	Queen For a Day	Castles In The Air	Co-writer, producer
2016	Anouk	Queen For a Day	We Are	Co-writer, producer
2016	Skillet	Unleached	Stay Til The Daylight	Co-writer, producer
2017	New Politics	Lost In Translation	CIA (single)	Co-writer, producer
2017	New Politics	Lost In Translation	Tell Your Dad (feat. Rivers Cuomo)	Co-writer, producer
2017	New Politics	Lost In Translation	Color Green (single)	Co-writer, producer
2017	Mary Lambert	Bold	Know Your Name (single)	Co-writer, producer
2018	Stray Kids	Mixtape	School Life	Co-writer, producer
2018	GOT7	&ME Edition	My Youth	Co-writer, co-producer
2018	Peter Jöback	Humanology	Shape Of You (single)	Co-writer, producer
2018	Peter Jöback	Humanology	How Great It is	Co-writer, producer
2018	Peter Jöback	Humanology	Rushing Into Love	Co-writer, producer
2018	Peter Jöback	Humanology	The Mask (single)	Co-writer, producer
2018	Peter Jöback	Humanology	Addicted (single)	Co-writer, producer
2018	Peter Jöback	Humanology	I Want To Know	Co-writer, producer
2018	Peter Jöback	Humanology	What If Tomorrow Never Comes	Co-writer, producer
2018	Peter Jöback	Humanology	Dancing	Co-writer, producer
2018	Peter Jöback	Humanology	Call Me By Your Name	Co-writer, producer
2018	Peter Jöback	Humanology	Believer	Co-writer, producer
2020	Joji	Nectar	Upgrade	Co-writer, co-producer
2022	Halsey	So Good	So Good (single)	Producer
2022	Kelly Clarkson, Lorna Courtney	& Juliet (Original Broadway Cast Recording)	Since U Been Gone (Juliet’s Version)	Producer
