= Pall Jenkins discography =

- Studio albums: 13
- EPs: 7
- Live albums: 1
- Compilation albums: 1

This article details the complete works of American musician Pall Jenkins.

== Discography ==
=== Three Mile Pilot ===
==== Studio albums ====
Title	Album details
Nà Vuccà Dò Lupù	Released: November 16, 1992 (US); Label: Headhunter; Formats: CD, LP
The Chief Assassin to the Sinister	Released: September 27, 1994 (US); Label: Headhunter; Formats: CD, CS, LP
Another Desert, Another Sea	Released: November 4, 1997 (US); Label: Headhunter; Formats: CD, LP
The Inevitable Past Is the Future Forgotten	Released: September 28, 2010 (US); Label: Temporary Residence Limited; Formats: CD, LP

==== Extended plays ====
Title	Album details
Starcontrol Out	Released: 1995 (US); Label: Negative; Formats: LP
Three Mile Pilot	Released: January 27, 1998 (US); Label: Gravity; Formats: CD, LP
Maps	Released: June 24, 2012 (US); Label: Temporary Residence Limited; Formats: CD, LP

==== Compilation albums ====
Title	Album details
Songs From an Old Town We Once Knew	Released: January 13, 2000 (US); Label: Cargo; Formats: CD

=== The Black Heart Procession ===
==== Studio albums ====
Title	Album details
1	Released: 1998 (US); Label: Headhunter; Formats: CD, LP
2	Released: 1999 (US); Label: Touch and Go; Formats: CD, LP
Three	Released: 2000 (US); Label: Touch and Go; Formats: CD, LP
Amore Del Tropico	Released: 2002 (US); Label: Touch and Go; Formats: CD, LP
The Spell	Released: 2006 (US); Label: Touch and Go; Formats: CD, LP
Six	Released: 2009 (US); Label: Touch and Go; Formats: CD, LP

==== Extended plays ====
Title	Album details
A 3 Song Recording	Released: 1999 (US); Label: Up; Formats: CD, LP
Fish the Holes on Frozen Lakes	Released: 2000 (US); Label: Gravity; Formats: CD, LP
Hearts and Tanks	Released: 2003 (US); Label: Shingle Street; Formats: CD
Blood Bunny / Black Rabbit	Released: 2010 (US); Label: Temporary Residence Limited; Formats: CD, LP

==== Compilation albums ====
Title	Album details
Days of Delusion - Live 2000/2002	Released: 2003 (US); Label: Mucchio Extra; Formats: CD

=== Ugly Casanova ===
Title	Album details
Sharpen Your Teeth	Released: May 21, 2002 (US); Label: Sub Pop; Formats: CD, LP

=== Mr. Tube and The Flying Objects ===
Title	Album details
Listen Up	Released: April 4, 2006 (US); Label: Sweet Nothing; Formats: CD, LP

== Credits ==
Year	Artist	Release	Role(s)	Song(s)
1993	Vampire Rodents	Lullaby Land	Lead vocals	"Gargoyles"
1995	Azalia Snail	Blue Danube	Bass guitar	"Poison Decree"
1995	Vampire Rodents	Clockseed	Lead vocals	"Tenochtitlan II"
2000	Maquiladora	White Sands	Guitar	"Termez 1936"
2004	Castanets	Cathedral	Instruments	—
2004	The Album Leaf	In a Safe Place	Lead vocals	"On Your Way", "Eastern Glow"
2004	The Album Leaf	In a Safe Place	Idiophone	"Twentytwofourteen"
2004	The Album Leaf	In a Safe Place	Guitar	"Eastern Glow"
2005	Ilya	Leaving Sans-Souci	Vocals	"Wasted Distance"
2006	The Album Leaf	Into the Blue Again	Bass guitar	"(Too Many People Fall for the Same) Lies"
2006	The Album Leaf	Into the Blue Again	Vocals	"Firewall"
2006	Horse Stories	Everyone's a Photographer	Backing vocals	"Wherever I Go"
2008	Miss Lana Rebel	All I Need	Idiophone	—
2009	West Coast Modern Day Punk Rock Orchestra	Correspondence	Vocals, organ, synthesizer	"Never Changes"
2010	The Poison Arrows	New Found Resolutions	Vocals	"Unveiled in Sequence"
2011	J Mascis	Several Shades of Why	Vocals	"Very Nervous and Love", "What Happened"
2011	J Mascis	Several Shades of Why	Organ	"What Happened"
2011	J Mascis	Several Shades of Why	Lap steel guitar, piano, idiophone	"Make It Right"
2011	Love Story in Blood Red	Hot Cha	Idiophone	"Write a Happy Ending", "Beautiful Mothers"
2013	Red Fang	Whales and Leeches	Vocals, idiophone	"Every Little Twist"
2014	J Mascis	Tied to a Star	Guitar	"Me Again", "Wide Awake"
2014	J Mascis	Tied to a Star	Vocals	"Every Morning", "Trailing Off"
