= Waiter (disambiguation) =

A waiter is a server of food and beverage.

Waiter or The Waiter may also refer to:

== Film ==
- Waiter!, 1983 French film
- Waiter (film), 2006 Dutch film
- The Waiter (2018 film), a Greek film
- The Waiter (2024 film), a Nigerian action comedy film

== Music ==
- The Waiter Chapters 1 - 7, 2008 album by The Black Heart Procession
  - "The Waiter", a song by The Black Heart Procession from the 1998 album 1
  - "The Waiter #2" and "The Waiter #3", Black Heart Procession songs from 1999 album 2
  - "The Waiter #4", Black Heart Procession song from 2002 album Amore del Tropico
  - "The Waiter #5", Black Heart Procession song from 2006 album The Spell

== Other uses ==
- Waiter (customs), British and English border enforcement and customs officers
- Waiter.com, an online restaurant delivery service
- Paul "The Waiter" Ricca, Italian-American mobster

== See also ==
- Waiters (disambiguation)
- Waiter Rant, a weblog written by ex-waiter Steve Dublanica
