= Starcontrol Out =

EP by Three Mile Pilot
- Released: 1995
- Recorded: 1993 – 1994
- Genre: Indie rock
- Label: Negative
- Producer: Three Mile Pilot

Three Mile Pilot chronology
The Chief Assassin to the Sinister (1994)	Starcontrol Out (1995)	Another Desert, Another Sea (1997)

Starcontrol Out is an EP by Three Mile Pilot, released in 1995 by Negative Records.

== Track listing ==
All lyrics are written by Pall Jenkins; all music is composed by Pall Jenkins, Armistead Burwell Smith IV and Tom Zinser.

No.	Title	Length
1.	"Inner Bishop"
2.	"Midgaard Serpent"
3.	"Chenjesu"
4.	"Piano Titanic"
5.	"Inside the Wash House"

== Personnel ==
Adapted from the Starcontrol Out liner notes.

Three Mile Pilot

- Pall Jenkins – vocals, guitar, engineering
- Armistead Burwell Smith IV – bass guitar, piano, backing vocals, engineering
- Tom Zinser – drums

Additional musicians

- Jim French – horns

Production and additional personnel

- Tchad Blake – engineering
- Jason Soares – design
- Three Mile Pilot – production, cover art, photography

== Release history ==
Region	Date	Label	Format	Catalog
United States	1995	Negative	LP	NR007X
