= Matt Hoyt =

American director

- Born: Matthew Hoyt; October 13, 1975
- Died: August 14, 2021 (aged 45); San Diego, California, US
- Burial place: Featheringill Mortuary
- Education: San Francisco State University; San Diego State University
- Occupations: Music video director; film director; voice actor; writer; musician
- Years active: 1994-2021
- Known for: Talk Talk; Antarctic...huh?; Starlite restaurant
- Notable work: Amore del Tropico
- Website: https://thematthoyt.com/

Matthew Hoyt (October 13, 1975 – August 14, 2021) was an American music video and film director, voice actor, writer, and musician best known for music videos of the bands Pinback, The Blackheart Procession, Goblin Cock and co-owning the San Diego restaurant and bar Starlite.

== Life and career ==
Hoyt went to Valhalla High School. He graduated from San Francisco State University with an English degree before earning a Master's degree in film from San Diego State University. Hoyt began directing music videos and short films after college. His work as an independent director led to work in advertising as a voice actor. As a musician, Matt played guitar and sang for the San Diego band Papillon. He was also the lead singer of Turkey Mallet featuring guitarist Dustin Boyer. Hoyt booked and promoted live music for the all-ages concert venue The Soul Kitchen in El Cajon, California from 1994 to 1996. He co-owned the San Diego restaurant and bar Starlite with Tim Mays and Steve Poltz and developed Talk Talk, an all green green-screen absurdist television show with Jason Sherry that was taped in front of a live studio audience.

=== Voice acting ===
Hoyt's voice acting career began unexpectedly, when he pretended to be a Japanese game show host to accompany sound design his friends had composed for a national advertising campaign. Subsequently, his voice-over work has appeared in several television spots, radio commercials and video games. His client list included Sony PlayStation, Toshiba, Wahoo's Fish Taco, Honey Baked Ham, as well as others.

=== Comedy and performance ===
Hoyt appeared as fictional British naturalist Alister Cranberry with the band Mr. Tube and the Flying Objects as an opening act for Stephen Malkmus and the Jicks in Solana Beach, CA in the summer of 2005. He recited fictional anecdotes from the life of Alister and sang along with the band. He was subsequently pelted with wet napkins from angry audience members. Hoyt remained in character and politely thanked the angry mob in typical British fashion.

He also portrayed the fictional radio talk-show host Devon Williams. The Devon Williams Show featured Hoyt interviewing various historical and non-historical figures in an improvisational format. As Devon, Hoyt frequently cut his guests short with music and commercials.

=== Film and video ===
Hoyt developed the episodic comedy Antarctic...huh?. An early draft screened at the Museum of Contemporary Art San Diego as part of the Here Not There series. In 2004, Hoyt collaborated with the band The Blackheart Procession to direct The Tropics of Love, a 70-minute visual accompaniment DVD for the band's full-length record Amore del Tropico.

== Death ==
Hoyt died in San Diego on August 14, 2021, at the age of 45. It was announced that October 13, 2021 would be The Matt Hoyt Day.
