= Karate discography =

Indie rock band discography

- Studio albums: 8
- EPs: 3
- Live albums: 2
- Compilation albums: 2
- Singles: 10

The discography of American indie rock band Karate consists of eight albums, two live albums, three EPs, ten singles, and two compilation albums.

The band formed in 1993 and released a demo tape, Sometimes You're A Radio, the same year. It was followed by the "Death Kit"/"Nerve" single and their self-titled album in 1995. In 1996, they released splits with The Crownhate Ruin and The Lune. The following year, they released the "Operation: Sand"/"Empty There" and the In Place of Real Insight album. 1997 saw the release of The Bed Is In The Ocean. While no releases came in the following two years, Unsolved was released in 2000. The "Cancel"/"Sing" single was released in 2001. 2002 had the release of Some Boots, while 2003 saw the release of their first live album, Concerto al Barchessone Vecchio. Their last album before the end of their original run, Pockets, was released in 2004. The band disbanded in 2005, with their last release being the In the Fishtank 12 EP. After disbanding, the members released a live album, 595, in 2007. The Numero Group began reissuing the band's material in 2021. They reunited in 2022. The following year saw their first compilation, Time Expired, with their second, Complete Studio Recordings, releasing in 2023. In 2024, the band and Numero Group began teasing new recordings, culminating in the announcement of Make It Fit, releasing in October of that year.

== Albums ==
=== Studio albums ===
Title	Release info
Sometimes You're A Radio	1993; Self-released; Cassette
Karate	1995; Southern Records; CD, LP, cassette
In Place of Real Insight	April 28, 1997; Southern Records; CD, LP, cassette
The Bed Is In The Ocean	1998; Southern Records; CD, LP, cassette
Unsolved	October 24, 2000; Southern Records; CD, LP, cassette
Some Boots	September 27, 2002; Southern Records; CD, LP
Pockets	August 23, 2004; Southern Records; CD, LP
Make It Fit	October 18, 2024; Numero Group; CD, LP, cassette, digital

=== Live albums ===
Title	Release info
Concerto al Barchessone Vecchio	February 2003; Fooltribe; CD
595	October 8, 2007; Southern Records; LP, CD; Recorded in 2003

=== Compilation albums ===
Title	Release info
Time Expired	June 21, 2022; Numero Group; LP, digital
Complete Studio Recordings	September 15, 2023; Numero Group; CD, digital
If You Can Hold Your Breath	September 12, 2025; Numero Group; LP, digital

== EPs ==
Title	Release info
Split with The Crownhate Ruin	1996; Art Monk Construction; 7"
"Cancel"/"Sing"	2001; Southern Records; CD
In the Fishtank 12	February 22, 2005; Konkurrent; CD, vinyl

== Singles ==
Title	Release info
"Death Kit"/"Nerve"	1995; Southern Records; 7"
"The Schwinn"/"On Letting You Go"	1996; Split with The Lune; 7"
"Operation: Sand"/"Empty There"	1997; Southern; 7"
"Cherry Coke"/"The Schwinn"	2021; The Numero Group; Digital
Fantasma	2023; The Numero Group; 7"; Split with Unwound
For Your Entertainment	2023; The Numero Group; Digital, cassette; Split with Unwound and Pelican
"Defendants" b/w "Silence, Sound"	2024; The Numero Group; Digital
"Around The Dial"	2024; Numero Group; Digital
"Cannibals"	2024; Numero Group; Digital
"Fall to Grace"	2024; Numero Group; Digital
"Dating is Stupid"	April 17, 2025; Numero Group; Digital
"Remembering to Forget"	May 15, 2025; Numero Group; Digital
"First Time"	June 12, 2025; Numero Group; Digital
"Hard Song"	August 7, 2025; Numero Group; Digital

== Appearances on other releases ==
Year	Song title	Release	Label
1996	"Bad Tattoo"	CMJ New Music Monthly Volume 34 June 1996	CMJ
1996	"What is Sleep?"	Little Darla Has A Treat For You Volume 3, Spring 1996	Darla Records
1997	"New New"	Little Darla Has A Treat For You Volume 7, Summer 1997	Darla Records
1998	"The Last Wars"	Southern Tree & Polyvinyl Fall / Winter 1998 Compilation	Polyvinyl/Tree/Southern Records
2000	"Empty There"	In My Living Room	Kimchee Records
2002	"Operation: Sand"	This River Runs Dry	Music Is My Heroin
2002	"Ice or Ground?"	Ottobre 2002	Il Mucchio Selvaggio
2003	"Airport"	93 Feet East Vol. 1	93 Records
2004	"With Age"	Music at Alive 2004_02	ALIVE
2004	"Tow Truck"	Music with Latitude	Southern Records
2005	"This Day Next Year"	Duyster.	[PIAS]
2005	"Water"	When The Cat Returns, The Mice Are Fucked	Southern Records
2007	"The Root and the Ruins"	Monopoly of Brilliance	Southern Records
2009	"- - -"	Campiones di Cassetti	Beerbird Records
2022	"New New"	Memorable But Not Honorable Mixtape Vol. 14	Memorable But Not Honorable
2023	"Today or Tomorrow"	Numero Twenty	The Numero Group
2025	"Cherry Coke" and "The Schwinn"	Sequoia	The Numero Group
2025	"This Day Next Year"	Flyoversx Presents Mixtape Series Volume 2: Jinjiang Mixtape	The Great Attractor
2026	"Today or Tomorrow"	Space Jams: Music From and Inspired by the Numeroverse	The Numero Group
2026	"Today or Tomorrow"	Flyoversx Presents Mixtape Series Volume 3: Pidu Wenjiang Mixtape	The Great Attractor

== See also ==
- Karate discography at Discogs
