= In the Fishtank =

Project of the independent music distributor Konkurrent

In the Fishtank is a series of extended plays released by Konkurrent, an independent music distributor based in the Netherlands. For the project, Konkurrent invited artists to record and gave them limited studio time. While individual bands recorded the first four releases, nine of the last eleven were the result of collaborations by multiple bands. Despite plans for more installments, the series has seen no new releases since In the Fishtank 15 in 2009.

== Album listing ==
- In the Fishtank 1 – Nomeansno
- In the Fishtank 2 – Guv'ner
- In the Fishtank 3 – Tassilli Players
- In the Fishtank 4 – Snuff
- In the Fishtank 5 – Tortoise + The Ex
- In the Fishtank 6 – June of 44
- In the Fishtank 7 – Low + Dirty Three
- In the Fishtank 8 – Willard Grant Conspiracy + Telefunk
- In the Fishtank 9 – Sonic Youth + Instant Composers Pool + The Ex
- In the Fishtank 10 – Motorpsycho + Jaga Jazzist Horns
- In the Fishtank 11 – The Black Heart Procession + Solbakken
- In the Fishtank 12 – Karate
- In the Fishtank 13 – Solex + M.A.E.
- In the Fishtank 14 – Isis + Aereogramme
- In the Fishtank 15 – Sparklehorse + Fennesz
