= Penelope (Pinback song) =

Single by Pinback

from the album Blue Screen Life
- B-side: "Anti-Hu"; "Seville" (Demo)
- Released: November, 2001
- Genre: Indie rock
- Label: Cutty Shark Records
- Songwriters: Rob Crow, ABS IV

Pinback singles chronology
"Tripoli" (2000)	"Penelope" (2001)

Penelope is a single released by indie rock band Pinback, on their album, Blue Screen Life. It is regarded as one of their most well-known songs. The two B-sides, "Anti-Hu" and "Seville" (Demo) can be found on Nautical Antiques.

The song was inspired by Armistead Burwell Smith IV's fish named Penelope, as can be seen on his Twitter page.

The song has been covered by several acts, including Chris Sorenson & Cove Reber (both of Saosin), and PlayRadioPlay!

== Track listing ==
1. "Penelope"
2. "Anti-Hu"
3. "Seville" (Demo)
