= The Chief Assassin to the Sinister =

Studio album by Three Mile Pilot
- Released: September 27, 1994
- Recorded: November 1993 – January 1994
- Genre: Indie rock, post-hardcore
- Length: 52:58
- Label: Headhunter; Geffen (re-issue)
- Producer: Three Mile Pilot

Three Mile Pilot chronology
Nà Vuccà Dò Lupù (1992)	The Chief Assassin to the Sinister (1994)	Starcontrol Out (1995)

Professional ratings
Review scores
Source	Rating
Allmusic	4.5/5 stars

The Chief Assassin to the Sinister is the second studio album by Three Mile Pilot, released on September 27, 1994 by Headhunter Records.

== Track listing ==
All lyrics are written by Pall Jenkins; all music is composed by Pall Jenkins, Armistead Burwell Smith IV and Tom Zinser.

No.	Title	Length
1.	"Shang vs. Hanger"	5:16
2.	"Circumcised"	4:41
3.	"Aqua-Magnetic"	8:18
4.	"The Chief Assassin to the Sinister"	4:42
5.	"97-MT"	4:06
6.	"X-Miner"	9:29
7.	"Vux Intruder"	4:19
8.	"Androsyn"	12:07

1995 track listing
No.	Title	Length
1.	"Shang vs. Hanger"	5:15
2.	"Circumcised"	4:40
3.	"Inner-Bishop"	4:26
4.	"Aqua-Magnetic"	8:17
5.	"The Chief Assassin to the Sinister"	4:42
6.	"97-MT"	4:04
7.	"X-Miner"	9:27
8.	"Chenjesu"	5:17
9.	"Midgaard Serpent"	4:37
10.	"Androsyn Guardian"	14:08

== Personnel ==
Adapted from The Chief Assassin to the Sinister liner notes.

Three Mile Pilot

- Pall Jenkins – vocals, guitar
- Armistead Burwell Smith IV – bass guitar, piano, cello, backing vocals
- Tom Zinser – drums

Additional musicians

- Jim French – horns (4)
- John Goff – bagpipes (1)
- Denver Lucas – spoken word (5)

Production and additional personnel

- Randy Antler – design
- Donnell Cameron – engineering (1, 5)
- Darryl Harvey – engineering (2–4, 6, 8)
- Three Mile Pilot – production, cover art, photography

== Release history ==
Region	Date	Label	Format	Catalog
United States	1994	Headhunter	CD, LP	CHCD-11
United States	1995	Geffen	CD, LP	DGCD-24726
United States	2011	Hi-Speed Soul	LP	HSS-1039
