= Arrive Having Eaten =

EP by Pinback
- Released: 2003
- Genre: Indie rock
- Length: 15:31

Pinback chronology
More or Less Live in a Few Different Places (2002)	Arrive Having Eaten (2003)	Offcell (2003)

Arrive Having Eaten is an EP by indie rock band Pinback.

== Track listing ==
1. "Sleep Bath" – 3:24
2. "Anti-Hu (version)" – 4:12
3. "Hohum" – 3:39
4. "Seville (version)" – 4:16
