= Blue Screen Life =

Studio album by Pinback
- Released: October 23, 2001
- Recorded: By the band in Armistead "Zach" Burwell Smith IV's house in California
- Genre: Indie rock
- Length: 51:08
- Label: Ace Fu

Pinback chronology
Some Voices (EP) (2000)	Blue Screen Life (2001)	Offcell (2003)

Professional ratings
Review scores
Source	Rating
AllMusic	3/5 stars
Pitchfork	(5.4/10)
BBC Music	(positive)

Blue Screen Life is the second album released by indie rock band Pinback. Ace Fu Records released the album in October 2001 in CD format, and a year later on vinyl.

== Track listing ==
No.	Title	Length
1.	"Offline P.K."	3:17
2.	"Concrete Seconds"	4:08
3.	"Boo"	3:58
4.	"Bbtone"	4:47
5.	"Penelope"	4:46
6.	"Talby"	4:01
7.	"X I Y"	3:32
8.	"Prog"	4:03
9.	"Your Sickness"	4:49
10.	"Seville"	4:08
11.	"West"	3:50
12.	"Tres"	5:48
Total length:		51:07

Japanese CD bonus tracks
No.	Title	Length
13.	"Serg"	2:34
14.	"Anti-Hu"	4:33
Total length:		58:14

== Personnel ==
- Rob Crow – Vocals, Electric Guitar, Acoustic Guitar, Baritone Guitar, Bass, Keyboards, Timpani, Drum Programming
- Armistead Burwell Smith IV – Vocals, Bass, Acoustic Guitar, Baritone Guitar, Keyboards, Accordion, Drums, Drum Programming

Additional musicians

- Tom Zinser – drums on "Concrete Seconds", "Prog" and "Your Sickness"
