= If Looks Could Kill (Jim French album) =

Studio album by Jim French with Diamanda Galás and Henry Kaiser
- Released: 1979
- Recorded: September 9, 1979
- Studio: Media Art Recording (Hermosa Beach, CA)
- Genre: Avant-garde jazz
- Length: 43:30
- Label: Metalanguage
- Producer: Henry Kaiser

Diamanda Galás chronology
If Looks Could Kill (1979)	The Litanies of Satan (1982)

If Looks Could Kill is the only studio album by avant-garde jazz musician Jim French, released in 1979 by Headhunter Records. It is one of composer Diamanda Galás' earliest musical recordings.

== Reception ==
Professional ratings
Review scores
Source	Rating
AllMusic	2/5 stars

Eugene Chadbourne of AllMusic was highly critical of If Looks Could Kill, describing it as disappointing overall and that "little of this music is developed or delivered with any amount of feeling." He gave the album two out of five stars, concluding that it might only be interesting for completists of his collaborators to seek out.

== Track listing ==
Side one
No.	Title	Writer(s)	Length
1.	"Picornponia"	Jim French	1:00
2.	"Lament"	Traditional arr.	1:00
3.	"Saltarello"	Traditional arr.	0:50
4.	"The Human Fancier's"	Jim French	2:50
5.	"Nobody Knows You"	Jimmy Cox	2:05
6.	"The Maple Leaf Rag"	Scott Joplin	1:25
7.	"Infrapolatia"	Jim French	5:15
8.	"Wolftraum"	Jim French	6:00

Side two
No.	Title	Writer(s)	Length
1.	"Looks Could Kill"	Jim French, Diamanda Galás	8:35
2.	"Envelope Please"	Jim French, Diamanda Galás, Henry Kaiser	4:15
3.	"Horses in Trouble"	Jim French, Henry Kaiser	3:00
4.	"Flag Day"	Diamanda Galás, Henry Kaiser	3:00
5.	"Having a Party"	Jim French, Henry Kaiser	1:00
6.	"Pillow Talk"	Jim French, Diamanda Galás, Henry Kaiser	3:15

== Personnel ==
Adapted from the If Looks Could Kill liner notes.

Musicians

- Jim French – soprano saxophone, sopranino saxophone, pan flute, pibcorn, electronics
- Diamanda Galás – vocals (B1–B6)
- Henry Kaiser – electric guitar (B1–B6), production, engineering

Production and additional personnel

- Phil Brown – mastering
- Rolf Erickson – engineering
- Dan Kyle – engineering
- Kent Strother – photography

== Release history ==
Region	Date	Label	Format	Catalog
United States	1979	Metalanguage	LP	ML 108
