= With Friends Like These =

With Friends Like These may refer to:

- With Friends Like These..., 1998 American film
- With Friends Like These (album), 1979 studio album by Fred Frith and Henry Kaiser
- With Friends Like These (2007 film), 2007 Flemish film
- With Friends Like These (podcast)
- "With Friends Like These" (Duckman), a 1997 television episode
- "With Friends Like These" (Rocko's Modern Life), a story from a 1996 television episode

== See also ==
- Friends Like These (disambiguation)
