= Friends Like These (disambiguation) =

Friends Like These is a British television game show.

Friends Like These may also refer to:

- Friends Like These (play), written by Gregory Crafts
- Friends Like These (book), by Danny Wallace
- Friends Like These (album), by Rhodes
- "Friends Like These" (Burn Notice), a 2009 television episode
- "Friends Like These" (Press Gang), a 1990 television episode

== See also ==
- With Friends Like These (disambiguation)
