= Information Retrieved, Pt. A =

- Cover Artwork by Daniel Danger

EP by Pinback
- Released: April 16, 2011
- Recorded: 2011
- Genre: Indie rock
- Length: 8:14
- Label: Temporary Residence Limited (TRR117)

Pinback chronology
Ascii EP (2008)	Information Retrieved, Pt. A (2011)	Information Retrieved Pt. B (2011)

Information Retrieved, Pt.A is an EP by indie rock band Pinback released as an exclusive 7" vinyl for Record Store Day on April 16, 2011. The EP is contained in a brown paper cover and a silk-screened evidence bag with custom Record Store Day tape. It was limited to 2,000 copies, some of which were pressed on colored vinyl. The cover art was designed by Daniel Danger. It was the first installment in a trilogy of releases of vinyl singles that led up to the release of Pinback's fifth studio album, Information Retrieved, which released in 2012.

== Track listing ==
1. "Sherman" - 3:35
2. "Thee Srum Proggitt" - 4:39
