= Some Voices =

Some Voices may refer to:

- Some Voices (film), a 2000 British film directed by Simon Cellan Jones
- Some Voices (EP), a 2002 EP by American indie rock band Pinback
- Some Voices (play), a 1994 British play written by Joe Penhall
