= Information Retrieved Pt. B =

Information Retrieved,, Pt. B

EP by Pinback
- Released: November 25, 2011
- Recorded: 2011
- Genre: Indie rock
- Length: 7:57
- Label: Temporary Residence Limited

Pinback chronology
Information Retrieved, Pt. A (2011)	Information Retrieved,, Pt. B (2011)	Information Retrieved (2012)

Information Retrieved, Pt. B is an EP by indie rock band Pinback that was released as an exclusive 7" vinyl for Black Friday on November 25, 2011. It is limited to 1700 copies. It was the second installment of the "Information Retrieved" EP trilogy leading up to the release of Pinback's fifth studio album, Information Retrieved, which released in 2012.

== Track listing ==
SIDE A

1. "True North" - 3:54

SIDE B

1. "CLOAD Q" - 4:03
2. "untitled" - data track
