= Waiters (surname) =

Waiters is a surname. Notable people with the surname include:

- Dion Waiters (born 1991), American basketball player
- Granville Waiters (1961–2021), American basketball player
- Mel Waiters (1956–2015), American musician
- Tony Waiters (1937–2020), English footballer and manager
- Van Waiters (born 1965), American football player

== See also ==
- Waiter (disambiguation)
