= Nà Vuccà Dò Lupù =

Studio album by Three Mile Pilot
- Released: November 16, 1992
- Recorded: October 1991 – June 1992
- Studios: Doubletime Studio (Santee, CA)
- Genres: Indie rock, Math rock
- Length: 74:20
- Label: Headhunter
- Producer: Three Mile Pilot

Three Mile Pilot chronology
Nà Vuccà Dò Lupù (1992)	The Chief Assassin to the Sinister (1994)

Professional ratings
Review scores
Source	Rating
Allmusic	2/5 stars

Nà Vuccà Dò Lupù (Sicilian for Into the mouth of the wolf, a colloquial way of saying "Good Luck") is the debut studio album of Three Mile Pilot, released on November 16, 1992 by Headhunter Records.

== Track listing ==
All lyrics are written by Pall Jenkins; all music is composed by Pall Jenkins, Armistead Burwell Smith IV and Tom Zinser.

No.	Title	Length
1.	"One Step Ladder"	9:26
2.	"Sore Loser"	4:37
3.	"Slow Hand"	3:39
4.	"Pinhut"	4:17
5.	"Walking With Your Mother"	3:09
6.	"Illwrath"	4:23
7.	"Unicycle Silencer"	5:33
8.	"Horse Sweat"	7:31
9.	"Paralyzed (Dressing the Kill)"	6:11
10.	"Feeling Bald"	5:51
11.	"Fig"	5:51
12.	"Huvakraft"	9:21
13.	"Dirt on the Flag Mud on the Wheel"	4:31

== Personnel ==
Adapted from the Nà Vuccà Dò Lupù liner notes.

Three Mile Pilot

- Pall Jenkins – vocals
- Armistead Burwell Smith IV – bass guitar, backing vocals
- Tom Zinser – drums

Additional musicians

- Jim French – Saxophone, Lur, Kalumus, Kühorn, Svegl

Production and additional personnel

- Randy Antler – design
- Jeff Forrest – engineering
- Three Mile Pilot – production, cover art, photography

== Release history ==
Region	Date	Label	Format	Catalog
United States	1992	Headhunter	CD, LP	CHCD-11
United States	2011	Hi-Speed Soul	LP	HSS-1038
