= Autumn of the Seraphs =

Studio album by Pinback
- Released: September 11, 2007
- Genre: Math rock
- Length: 44:05
- Label: Touch and Go

Pinback chronology
Nautical Antiques (2006)	Autumn of the Seraphs (2007)	Information Retrieved (2012)

Professional ratings
Review scores
Source	Rating
AllMusic	4/5 stars
Okayplayer	3.5/5 stars
Pitchfork	7.8/10
Stylus	B+

Autumn of the Seraphs is the fourth full-length album from the San Diego, California band Pinback. The album was released on September 11, 2007 on Touch and Go Records. The first pressing of Autumn of the Seraphs comes packaged with a limited-edition bonus disc. The bonus disc includes three brand new, unreleased, studio-recorded Pinback songs, two of which come from the Autumn sessions.

The album artwork was created by Mike Sutfin who has also contributed work for the Magic: The Gathering collectible card game.

== Track listing ==
No.	Title	Length
1.	"From Nothing to Nowhere"	3:28
2.	"Barnes"	4:17
3.	"Good to Sea"	3:12
4.	"How We Breathe"	4:07
5.	"Walters"	4:00
6.	"Subbing for Eden"	3:32
7.	"Devil You Know"	3:55
8.	"Blue Harvest"	3:34
9.	"Torch"	4:34
10.	"Bouquet"	5:10
11.	"Off by 50"	4:00
Total length:		44:05

Japanese CD bonus track
No.	Title	Length
12.	"The Speed of Dub"	4:16
Total length:		48:21

iTunes digital download bonus track
No.	Title	Length
12.	"The Hatenaughts of Melancholy Wall"	5:39
Total length:		49:44

Autumn of the Seraphs - Bonus EP
No.	Title	Length
1.	"I'm a Pretty Lady"	3:52
2.	"Kylie"	3:59
3.	"Autumn of the Seraphs"	4:16
Total length:		12:07

== Personnel ==
Primary musicians (Pinback)

- Rob Crow – vocals; electric, acoustic, baritone, and 12-string guitars; bass; piano; drums and drum programming; synthesizer; violin
- Zach Smith – bass, piano, vocals, electric and baritone guitars, synthesizer, drum programming

Additional musicians

- Chris Prescott – drums on tracks 2, 6, 7, 8, 9, 10, and 11
- Mario Rubalcaba – drums on track 1

Production

- Rob Crow and Zach Smith – recording, mixing
- Mark Trombino – mixing on track 7

Album artwork

- Mike Sutfin – artwork
- David Babbitt – artwork layout

== Charts ==
Chart	Peak position
Billboard 200	69
Belgian Albums (Ultratop Flanders)	50

== See also ==
- Seraph
