= In the Fishtank 12 =

2005 EP by Karate

EP by Karate
- Released: 2005
- Recorded: July 2004
- Studio: E-Sound
- Genre: Indie rock, punk rock
- Length: 21:31
- Label: Konkurrent
- Producer: Zlaya Hadzic

Karate chronology
Pockets (2004)	In the Fishtank 12 (2005)	595 (2007)

In the Fishtank chronology
In the Fishtank 11 (2004)	In the Fishtank 12 (2005)	In the Fishtank 13 (2005)

Professional ratings
Review scores
Source	Rating
Pitchfork	6.8/10

In the Fishtank 12 is a 2004 EP by indie rock Karate as the 12th entry in the In the Fishtank series. Recorded in July 2004, the EP is made up of covers of songs with critical views on American society. Most of the songs were originally by The Minutemen.

== Reception ==
Brian Howe of Pitchfork said that "without revising the originals, Karate nudges them toward their own style-- a bit anesthetized, with a chilly precision bordering on blandness."

== Track listing ==
1. "Strange Fruit" – 2:18
2. "The Only Minority" – 1:03
3. "Tears of Rage" – 4:12
4. "Bob Dylan Wrote Propaganda Songs" – 1:35
5. "Need a Job" – 2:20
6. "This Ain't No Picnic" – 1:55
7. "Colors" – 2:29
8. "A New Jerusalem" – 5:37

== Personnel ==
- Geoff Farina – guitar, vocals
- Jeff Goddard – bass
- Gavin McCarthy – drums
- Zlaya Hadzic – producer, mixer, mastering
- David Klooker – engineer
- Lewis Allan – writer (track 1)
- D. Boon – writer (tracks 2, 6, 7)
- Mike Watt – writer (tracks 2, 4, 7)
- Bob Dylan – writer (track 3)
- Beefeater – writer (track 5)
- Mark Hollis – writer (track 8)
