= The Laughing Stock of Indie Rock =

Studio album by Solex
- Released: September 28, 2004
- Studios: Studio Aftrap, Amsterdam
- Genre: Indie rock
- Length: 37:57
- Label: Arena Rock Recording Company
- Producer: Solex

Solex chronology
Low Kick and Hard Bop (2001)	The Laughing Stock of Indie Rock (2004)	In the Fishtank 13 (2005)

Professional ratings
Review scores
Source	Rating
AllMusic	3.5/5 stars
PopMatters	mixed

The Laughing Stock of Indie Rock is the fourth studio album by Solex. It was released via Arena Rock Recording Company on September 28, 2004.

== Reception ==
Heather Phares of AllMusic gave the album 3.5 stars out of 5, calling it "[Solex's] most straightforward, accessible collection of songs yet." Zeth Lundy of PopMatters said, "Solex does not write orthodox songs or function as an acceptable DJ for your next house party." He added, "The Laughing Stock of Indie Rock falls somewhere in between the two, a mash-up of thick, freaky beats and horn-rimmed bedroom indie rock."

== Track listing ==
All tracks are written by Solex.

No.	Title	Length
1.	"Yadda Yadda Yadda No. 1"	2:04
2.	"A Round Figure"	2:45
3.	"The Boxer"	4:06
4.	"Honkey Donkey"	3:32
5.	"You're Ugly"	2:38
6.	"Hot Diggitydog Run Run Run"	2:49
7.	"Fold Your Hands Child, You Walk Like an Egyptian"	1:39
8.	"My B-Sides Rock Your World"	3:10
9.	"On an Ordinary Day"	2:41
10.	"The Show Master"	3:12
11.	"Take That Gum Out!"	2:30
12.	"You've Got Me"	6:51

== Personnel ==
Credits adapted from liner notes.

- Elisabeth Esselink – words, music, production, recording, mixing
- Stuart Brown – vocals
- Geert de Groot – guitar
- Robert Lagendijk – drums
