= In the Fishtank 11 =

EP by The Black Heart Procession and Solbakken
- Released: March 9, 2004
- Recorded: Netherlands, July 2003
- Genre: Experimental, indie rock
- Length: 34:13
- Label: In the Fishtank (Konkurrent)
- Producer: Zlaya Hadzic

The Black Heart Procession chronology
| Amore del Tropico (2002) | In the Fishtank 11 (2004) | The Spell (2006) |

In the Fishtank chronology
| In the Fishtank 10 (2003) | In the Fishtank 11 (2004) | In the Fishtank 12 (2005) |

Professional ratings
Review scores
| Source | Rating |
|---|---|
| AllMusic | 3/5 stars |

In the Fishtank 11 is an EP by The Black Heart Procession and Solbakken.

== Track listing ==
1. "Voiture En Rouge" – 5:48
2. "Dog Song" – 3:21
3. "Nervous Persian" – 5:38
4. "A Taste of You and Me" – 3:58
5. "Things Go on with Mistakes" – 10:56
6. "Your Cave" – 4:32
