= Low Kick and Hard Bop =

Studio album by Solex
- Released: September 11, 2001
- Recorded: 2001
- Studios: Studio Aftrap, Amsterdam
- Genre: Indie rock
- Length: 42:09
- Label: Matador Records
- Producer: Solex

Solex chronology
Pick Up (1999)	Low Kick and Hard Bop (2001)	The Laughing Stock of Indie Rock (2004)

Professional ratings
Aggregate scores
Source	Rating
Metacritic	69/100
Review scores
Source	Rating
AllMusic	4.5/5 stars
Pitchfork	6.8/10
PopMatters	unfavorable

Low Kick and Hard Bop is the third studio album by Solex. It was released via Matador Records on September 11, 2001.

== Reception ==
At Metacritic, which assigns a weighted average score out of 100 to reviews from mainstream critics, the album received an average score of 69% based on 12 reviews, indicating "generally favorable reviews".

Heather Phares of AllMusic gave the album 4.5 stars out of 5, saying, "it's an evocative and wildly creative, but not immediately accessible collection." Paul Cooper of Pitchfork gave the album a 6.8 out of 10, saying, "While I'm not asking for a duet with Peaches or a remix by the Streets, I would appreciate a new facet to the customary lo-fi diamond boogaloo."

== Track listing ==
All tracks are written by Solex.

No.	Title	Length
1.	"Low Kick and Hard Bop"	3:12
2.	"Mere Imposters"	2:23
3.	"Have You No Shame, Girl?"	3:09
4.	"Not a Hoot!"	2:49
5.	"Knee-high"	2:41
6.	"Honey (Amsterdam Is Not L.A.!)"	3:22
7.	"Shoot! Shoot!"	3:08
8.	"Comely Row"	3:22
9.	"Ease Up You Fundamentalists!"	2:34
10.	"The Dot on the I Between the H and the T"	2:36
11.	"Good Comrades Go to Heaven"	3:39
12.	"Cayenne"	2:08
13.	"Ololo"	3:08
14.	"You Say Potato, I Say Aardappel"	1:37
15.	"Look... No Fingerprints!"	2:21

== Personnel ==
Credits adapted from liner notes.

- Elisabeth Esselink – words, music, production, recording, mixing
- Andrew Blick – trumpet (on "Knee-high")
- Robert Lagendijk – Amsterdam-school of drum fills
