= 595 (album) =

2007 live album by Karate

Live album by Karate
- Released: October 8, 2007
- Recorded: 5 May 2003
- Venues: Stuk, Leuven, Belgium
- Genres: Indie rock, jazz rock, post-rock
- Length: 49:42
- Labels: Southern, Numero

Karate chronology
Pockets (2004)	595 (2007)	"Cherry Coke"/"The Schwinn" (2021)

595 is the second live album released by American indie rock band Karate, released on October 8, 2007 on Southern Records. It was originally recorded on May 5, 2003. The album, along with the rest of the band's discography, was reissued in 2021 by The Numero Group.

== Background ==
Karate formed in 1993 and released seven albums before disbanding in 2005. Throughout their time together, the band allowed sound technicians to record their shows and sent them to the band afterwards, receiving dozens of recordings in varying qualities. A recording of their 595th concert in Leuven, Belgium on May 5, 2003 stood out to them as their favorite live performance, as it was both in extremely high quality and a great performance. In 2007, the band decided to release the live album officially as their first fully official live album (they released Concerto al Barchessone Vecchio in 2003, but it is partially unofficial).

== Reception ==
Aaron Leitko of Pitchfork gave the album a 7 and said the album "proves that Farina and his cohorts weren't wet noodles. Beyond the tube amp obsession and the couplets about refrigerator noise, Karate was actually a dynamic and exciting band. And they were even better when somebody was watching."

Corey Kahn of AllMusic gave the album four stars out of five and said "this careful song selection and their flawless performances that justify the posthumous release of this live album, making it a real treat for fans who thought they'd never hear the sound of these three talented musicians on-stage again."

Alarm Magazine said that "recording quality is an important aspect of a live record, and though it doesn’t compare to the importance of the material itself, this is where Karate shines. Maintaining an air of improvisation and interpretation of their material, Karate manage to come back from jazz deviations straight into solid pop songwriting."

Mike Diver with Drowned in Sound said "this echo of Karate’s quite singular excellence reaffirms their critical standing as one of the best bands to have ever called the Southern stable home."

No Fade Out named the album their album of the week in January 2022 and said the album "is the best farewell the band could give to their numerous and loyal fans, but also a wonderful meeting point for those who don't know Karate."

== Track listing ==
All tracks are written by Geoff Farina/Karate.

No.	Title	Length
1.	"The Roots and the Ruins"	3:01
2.	"Airport"	4:36
3.	"In Hundreds"	9:34
4.	"Original Spies"	6:45
5.	"Number 6"	5:21
6.	"There Are Ghosts"	3:55
7.	"Sever"	6:19
8.	"Caffeine or Me"	10:11
Total length:		49:42
