= Maps (EP) =

EP by Three Mile Pilot
- Released: June 24, 2012
- Recorded: 2010
- Genre: Indie rock
- Length: 19:27
- Label: Temporary Residence
- Producer: Three Mile Pilot

Three Mile Pilot chronology
The Inevitable Past Is the Future Forgotten (2010)	Maps (2012)

Professional ratings
Review scores
Source	Rating
Pitchfork Media	(5.0/10)

Maps is an EP by Three Mile Pilot, released on July 24, 2012, by Temporary Residence Limited.

== Track listing ==
All lyrics are written by Pall Jenkins; all music is composed by Pall Jenkins, Armistead Burwell Smith IV and Tom Zinser.

No.	Title	Length
1.	"Long Way Up"	4:11
2.	"Wires"	3:56
3.	"This Escape"	3:59
4.	"Blu"	3:46
5.	"Birdy"	3:35

== Personnel ==
Adapted from the Maps liner notes.

Three Mile Pilot

- Pall Jenkins – vocals, guitar
- Armistead Burwell Smith IV – bass guitar, backing vocals
- Tom Zinser – drums, accordion

Production and additional personnel

- Kris Poulin – mixing
- Three Mile Pilot – production, recording

== Release history ==
Region	Date	Label	Format	Catalog
United States	2012	Temporary Residence	CD, LP	TRR192
