= Pick Up (album) =

Studio album by Solex
- Released: September 14, 1999
- Studios: Studio Aftrap, Amsterdam; Studio Orkater, Amsterdam
- Genres: Art pop; indie rock
- Length: 44:07
- Label: Matador Records
- Producer: Solex

Solex chronology
| Solex vs. the Hitmeister (1998) | Pick Up (1999) | Low Kick and Hard Bop (2001) |

Singles from Pick Up
- 1. "Randy Constanza" Released: 1999; 2. "Athens Ohio" Released: 2000

Professional ratings
Review scores
| Source | Rating |
|---|---|
| AllMusic | 4/5 stars |
| Pitchfork | 7.6/10 |

Pick Up is the second studio album by Solex. It was released via Matador Records on September 14, 1999. It peaked at number 34 on CMJ's Radio 200 chart. As with her previous album Solex vs. the Hitmeister (1998), Pick Up is an art pop album that uses samples "in ways that both boggle and seduce".

== Reception ==
Heather Phares of AllMusic gave the album 4 stars out of 5, saying, "Elisabeth Esselink continues to recycle bad music into good, sampling the kitschiest, cheesiest records in her shop and shaping them into her distinctive musical vision." S. Murray of Pitchfork gave the album a 7.6 out of 10, saying, "Pick Up is a strong developmental achievement in the right direction for Solex, and should stand as inspiration for used record store owners the world over." T'Cha Dunlevy of The Gazette called it an unpredictable album where "noise is contorted to suit her melodic ends. Her voice is sweet and dreamy; songs materialize out of abstraction, sounding like they were there all along." They concluded it was a "distinctly creative, skewed and happy album".

== Track listing ==
All tracks are written by Solex.

| No. | Title | Length |
|---|---|---|
| 1. | "Pick Up" | 3:04 |
| 2. | "Randy Costanza" | 3:25 |
| 3. | "Dork at 12 O'Clock" | 2:52 |
| 4. | "That's What You Get with People Like That on Cruises Like These" | 3:02 |
| 5. | "Oh Blimey!" | 2:50 |
| 6. | "The Burglars Are Coming!" | 3:19 |
| 7. | "Superfruity" | 3:00 |
| 8. | "Snappy & Cocky" | 2:34 |
| 9. | "Five Star Shamberg" | 3:20 |
| 10. | "Chris the Birthday Boy" | 3:16 |
| 11. | "Athens Ohio" | 3:11 |
| 12. | "Escargot!" | 3:13 |
| 13. | "Another Tune Like 'Not Fade Away'" | 3:41 |
| 14. | "That'll Be $22.95" | 3:20 |

== Personnel ==
Credits adapted from liner notes.

- Elisabeth Esselink – words, music, production, recording, mixing
- Frank van der Weij – recording, mixing
- Robert Lagendijk – drums (on all tracks except 13)
- Geert de Groot – guitar (on 1, 2, 4, 13, and 14)
- Shane Deleon – clarinet (on 5, 6, 9, 10, and 12)
- Cory Vielma – vocals (on 5 and 6)
- Michael Shamberg – vocals (on 9)
