= Solex vs. the Hitmeister =

Studio album by Solex
- Released: 10 March 1998
- Studios: Solex's home; Sound Enterprise (Weesp)
- Genres: Experimental pop; trip hop; sound collage; indietronica; plunderphonics
- Length: 41:54
- Label: Matador
- Producers: Solex; Frans Hagenaars

Solex chronology
Solex vs. the Hitmeister (1998)	Pick Up (1999)

Singles from Solex vs. the Hitmeister
- 1. "Solex All Licketysplit" Released: 6 April 1998

Solex vs. the Hitmeister is the debut studio album by Dutch musician Solex. It was released on 10 March 1998 by Matador Records.

== Critical reception ==
Professional ratings
Review scores
Source	Rating
AllMusic	4.5/5 stars
Entertainment Weekly	B+
The Guardian	4/5 stars
NME	8/10
Pitchfork	7.6/10
Spin	7/10

Heather Phares of AllMusic wrote, "A completely unique combination of beats, samples, and voice, Solex is insular and inventive, revealing an artist with a very personal kind of creativity." David Browne of Entertainment Weekly said, "The echoey, rattling, wind-tunnel music lends an even eerier power to her tales of obsessions both romantic and physical."

In 2015, Fact placed Solex vs. the Hitmeister at number 28 on its list of the best trip hop albums of all time.

== Track listing ==
All tracks are written by Solex.

No.	Title	Length
1.	"One Louder Solex"	3:27
2.	"Solex Feels Lucky"	3:46
3.	"Solex in a Slipshod Style"	3:44
4.	"Waking Up with Solex"	3:32
5.	"Solex's Snag"	4:09
6.	"Rolex by Solex"	2:46
7.	"There's a Solex on the Run"	3:30
8.	"Solex All Licketysplit"	2:24
9.	"Solex for a While"	3:53
10.	"Some Solex"	3:35
11.	"When Solex Just Stood There"	3:24
12.	"Peppy Solex"	3:44
Total length:		41:54

Japanese edition bonus track
No.	Title	Length
13.	"Solex Is Barely Dressed"	1:28
Total length:		43:22

== Personnel ==
Credits are adapted from the album's liner notes.

- Solex (Elisabeth Esselink) – performance, production, mixing, sleeve design
- Gerard Atema – clarinet
- Geert de Groot – guitar, piano, cello, bass guitar, melodica
- Frans Hagenaars – production, engineering, mixing
- Flip Heurckmans – engineering (assistant)
- Jeroen Kramer – saxophone, clarinet
- Robert Lagendijk – drums, vocals
- Colette Sloots – graphic editing
