= Friends & Enemies =

Album by Fred Frith and Henry Kaiser

Compilation album by Fred Frith and Henry Kaiser
- Released: June 1999
- Recorded: July 1979, October 1983, October 1984 (live sets), January 1999
- Venues: Wolfgangs, San Francisco; McCabe's, Santa Monica; Kuuwumba Jazz Society, Santa Cruz
- Studios: Mobius Music, San Francisco
- Genres: Experimental music, free improvisation, noise
- Length: 158:50
- Label: Cuneiform (US)
- Producers: Henry Kaiser, Fred Frith

Fred Frith and Henry Kaiser chronology
With Enemies Like These, Who Needs Friends? (1987)	Friends & Enemies (1999)

Fred Frith chronology
Pacifica (1998)	Friends & Enemies (1999)	Stone, Brick, Glass, Wood, Wire (1999)

Friends & Enemies is a 1999 double-CD compilation album of studio and live material by Fred Frith and Henry Kaiser. It contains the complete collaborative recordings of Frith and Kaiser from 1979 to 1999, namely their two studio albums With Friends Like These (1979) and Who Needs Enemies? (1983), an unreleased live album recorded in 1984, and new studio tracks recorded in 1999. The album was released by Cuneiform Records in June 1999.

== Background ==
Oliver DiCicco was the engineer for Frith and Kaiser's two collaborative albums, With Friends Like These and Who Needs Enemies? at Mobius Music in San Francisco, and for the 1999 studio sessions, also at Mobius Music. DiCicco wrote in the Friends & Enemies liner notes that during these recording sessions he "was free to become part of the creative team in a way that transcended mere audio engineering". He said that this creativity "enriched my life and inspired my own artistry".

DiCicco noted that the duo "possess a very special chemistry", with Frith contributing "compositional and melodic aesthetic", and Kaiser adding "an unfettered approach to sound and guitar technique". While making With Friends Like These in 1979, and Who Needs Enemies? in 1983, DiCicco recognized the significance of what they were doing. But it was only during the 1999 studio sessions that he realised how "far ahead of their time" those recording were. DiCicco said their utilization of noise "predates most of the 'out' genre that followed", and the LinnDrum programming on Who Needs Enemies? and the unreleased live album "predated the '90s drum 'n' bass music by more than a decade".

== Reception ==
Professional ratings
Review scores
Source	Rating
AllMusic	4/5 stars
Exclaim!	Favorable

In a review of Friends & Enemies in AllMusic, Rick Anderson described Frith and Kaiser's first collaboration, With Friends Like These as "one of the defining documents of the downtown avant-garde scene", and said their improvised duets "essentially redefined the sound of the guitar". He complimented Cuneiform Records on including all of the duo's recorded work in this compilation, and called it "a must for noise fans, skronk hounds, and adventurous guitarheads".

Writing in Exclaim!, David Lewis described the evolution of Frith and Kaiser's collaborations, from the Derek Bailey-inspired improvisations with "skewed riff and oddball time signatures" in With Friends Like These, to their inclusion of drum machines and other technologies in Who Needs Enemies? and their unreleased live album—which Lewis said gave their music "a dated and cheesy appeal", to their latest collaborations in 1999 where they blend new technologies with the "purity and beauty" of their first album. Lewis called Friends & Enemies "essential guitar music", and "[a] gem".

== Track listing ==
All music by Fred Frith and Henry Kaiser, except where noted.

CD 1
No.	Title	Original album	Length
1.	"It Moves ..."	With Friends Like These (1979)	2:07
2.	"The Changing of Names"	With Friends Like These	5:47
3.	"It Sings"	With Friends Like These	5:40
4.	"Believing What We Read"	With Friends Like These	3:02
5.	"...But Does It Swing?"	With Friends Like These	3:31
6.	"Hard Time Killin' Floor Blues" (Skip James)	Who Needs Enemies? (1983)	3:31
7.	"The Golden Eighties"	Who Needs Enemies?	5:46
8.	"Everyday Objects"	Who Needs Enemies?	2:49
9.	"The Kirghiz Light"	Who Needs Enemies?	4:55
10.	"Special Rider Blues" (James)	Who Needs Enemies?	4:31
11.	"Drowsy Maggie"	Unreleased live album (recorded 1984)	4:06
12.	"An HK Guitar Solo" (Kaiser)	Unreleased live album	3:32
13.	"Strandloper"	Unreleased live album	1:17
14.	"Major Nichols"	Unreleased live album	3:53
15.	"The Live Trace"	Unreleased live album	4:38
16.	"See Over"	Unreleased studio sessions (recorded 1999)	9:05
17.	"Fourth Rail"	Unreleased studio sessions	5:13
18.	"Squirrely"	Unreleased studio sessions	2:56
19.	Untitled (hidden track (Note: An untitled track at the end of "Squirrely" after 1:10 of silence.))	Unreleased studio sessions	1:36

CD 2
No.	Title	Original album	Length
1.	"Twisted Memories Give Way to the Angry Present"	With Friends Like These (1979)	3:53
2.	"Black Glass"	With Friends Like These	5:28
3.	"Third Rail"	With Friends Like These	3:28
4.	"Three Languages"	With Friends Like These	9:29
5.	"One of Nature's Mistakes"	Who Needs Enemies? (1983)	2:07
6.	"Roy Rogers"	Who Needs Enemies?	5:00
7.	"The Confession"	Who Needs Enemies?	3:56
8.	"Objects Everyday"	Who Needs Enemies?	2:50
9.	"Wool and Water"	Who Needs Enemies?	4:12
10.	"The Trace"	Who Needs Enemies?	2:53
11.	"Life in Hell"	Unreleased live album (recorded 1984)	5:37
12.	"The Incarceration"	Unreleased live album	5:39
13.	"An FF Bass Solo" (Frith)	Unreleased live album	2:38
14.	"John S. French"	Unreleased live album	3:32
15.	"Fifteen Blues"	Unreleased live album	4:34
16.	"Dog Puppet Born Out of a Sock"	Unreleased live album	2:07
17.	"Reading Glasses"	Unreleased studio sessions (recorded 1999)	2:03
18.	"A Portrait of the Artists as Two Old Men"	Unreleased studio sessions	7:06
19.	Untitled (hidden track (Note: An untitled track at the end of "A Portrait of the Artists as Two Old Men" after 1:20 of silence.))	Unreleased studio sessions	1:11

Sources: Liner notes, Discogs, Fred Frith discography.

=== Hidden tracks ===
This compilation has two hidden tracks not listed in the liner notes:

== Personnel ==
- Fred Frith – electric and acoustic guitars, 4 and 6 string bass guitars, LinnDrum programming, violin, marimba, piano, Casio 202 organ
- Henry Kaiser – electric and acoustic guitars, 6 string bass guitar, LinnDrum programming, electric sitar, banjo, piano

Sources: Liner notes, Discogs, Fred Frith discography.

=== Sound ===
- Engineering by Oliver DiCicco
  - Studio tracks recorded at
    - Mobius Music, San Francisco
  - Live tracks recorded at
    - Wolfgangs, San Francisco
    - McCabe's, Santa Monica
    - Kuuwumba Jazz Society, Santa Cruz
- Produced and mixed by Fred Frith and Henry Kaiser
- Mastered by Paul Stubblebine at Paul's Gourmet Mastering, San Francisco
- Wood figurines by Henry Turner
- Photography (Frith, Kaiser, DiCicco) by Carol LeMaitre
- Photography (figurines) by Alden Ludlow
- CD liner notes by Oliver DiCicco
- CD package design by David Greenberger

Sources: Liner notes, Discogs, Fred Frith discography.
