= In the Fishtank 13 =

EP by Solex and Maarten Altena Ensemble
- Released: February 2005
- Recorded: January 2004
- Genre: Electronica
- Length: 32:47
- Label: In the Fishtank (Konkurrent)
- Producer: Zlaya Hadzic

Solex chronology
The Laughing Stock of Indie Rock (2004)	In the Fishtank 13 (2006)

In the Fishtank chronology
In the Fishtank 12 (2005)	In the Fishtank 13 (2005)	In the Fishtank 14 (2006)

Professional ratings
Review scores
Source	Rating
AllMusic	3/5 stars

In the Fishtank 13 features Solex and the Maarten Altena Ensemble.

== Track listing ==
1. 5 Superstar
2. Go Easy On The Fun Fund
3. 1 + 1 = 11
4. Birthday Superboy
