= Songs From an Old Town We Once Knew =

Compilation album by Three Mile Pilot
- Released: January 13, 2000
- Recorded: 1992–1996
- Genre: Indie rock, post-hardcore
- Length: 99:51
- Label: Cargo
- Producer: Three Mile Pilot

Three Mile Pilot chronology
Three Mile Pilot (1998)	Songs From an Old Town We Once Knew (2000)	The Inevitable Past Is the Future Forgotten (2010)

Professional ratings
Review scores
Source	Rating
Allmusic	4/5 stars
Pitchfork Media	(6.1/10)

Songs From an Old Town We Once Knew is a compilation album by Three Mile Pilot, released on January 13, 2000 by Cargo Music.

== Track listing ==
All lyrics are written by Pall Jenkins; all music is composed by Pall Jenkins, Armistead Burwell Smith IV and Tom Zinser.

Disc one
No.	Title	Length
1.	"Nussun"	6:07
2.	"The Silver Monkey Syndicate"	4:37
3.	"The House Is Loss"	6:15
4.	"Piano Plus"	4:29
5.	"Piano Minus"	6:23
6.	"Red Sensing"	5:30
7.	"Sewn to Our Side"	4:15
8.	"In This Town I Awaken"	4:38
9.	"The Approach"	5:33
10.	"Tripoli"	2:08

Disc two
No.	Title	Length
1.	"Jadulastan Requiem"	11:39
2.	"A Very Old Bass"	3:44
3.	"This Divine Crown"	3:58
4.	"The Open Sided"	3:56
5.	"Terry D."	3:04
6.	"Cyrus"	4:17
7.	"Everything"	1:45
8.	"As All the Fish Go on Parade"	3:38
9.	"The Trail"	4:13
10.	"Piano Titanic"	2:08
11.	"The Urquan Destroyer"	7:34

== Personnel ==
Adapted from the Songs From an Old Town We Once Knew liner notes.

Three Mile Pilot

- Pall Jenkins – vocals, guitar
- Armistead Burwell Smith IV – bass guitar, backing vocals
- Tom Zinser – drums

== Release history ==
Region	Date	Label	Format	Catalog
United States	2000	Cargo	CD	HED-083
