= Jim French (musician) =

- Born: July 15, 1954 (age 71); Oklahoma City, Oklahoma
- Genres: Avant-garde jazz, post-hardcore
- Occupation: Musician
- Instrument: Saxophone
- Years active: 1970s–present
- Label: Metalanguage

Jim French (born July 15, 1954) is an American avant-garde jazz saxophonist. He has performed with Diamanda Galás and Henry Kaiser as well as frequently collaborated with post-hardcore group Three Mile Pilot. Recognized for his virtuoso saxophone playing, French is also known to have created most of the instruments he plays, such as the "Frenchophone," and for crafting custom mouthpieces for prominent artists such as Pharoah Sanders.

== Biography ==
French was born on July 15, 1954, in Oklahoma City. He began crafting custom instruments when he was still a boy and became influenced by the indigenous music of North America. In 1970s, French moved to San Diego and became a leading figure in the local avant-garde jazz scene. During that time, he was a member of the San Diego band CETA VI. His first recorded appearance was on 1977's Sir Henry at Rawlinson End, a spoken-word, solo comedy record by Vivian Stanshall. French released his only album in 1979, titled If Looks Could Kill. It is notable for being the recording debut of avant-garde vocalist Diamanda Galás and the involvement of guitarist Henry Kaiser. As a lover of ritual, French appeared on the premiere recording of "Music from the Island of Anaphoria" playing alongside some of the Islands finest musicians. During the 1990s, French collaborated multiple times with indie rock band Three Mile Pilot, appearing on their albums Nà Vuccà Dò Lupù, The Chief Assassin to the Sinister and Another Desert, Another Sea.

== Discography ==
- 1979: If Looks Could Kill (Metalanguage)
