= Solex (musician) =

Dutch musician

- Born: Elisabeth Esselink; 14 August 1965 (age 61); Delft, Netherlands
- Genre: Indie rock
- Labels: BronzeRat; Matador; Arena Rock
- Formerly of: Sonetic Vet

Liesbeth Esselink (born 14 August 1965), known by her stage name Solex, is a Dutch musician based in Amsterdam. Her music is a light-hearted amalgamation of pop music, electronica and sampling.

== Overview ==
After singing in a new wave band and performing as a member of the Dutch indie/noise pop group Sonetic Vet, Esselink began the Solex project in order to give herself a more complete and fulfilling musical outlet. The name is taken from the French moped manufacturer Solex.

Utilizing the records in her own record store, she assembled her music on an antique 8-track recorder, singing original lyrics over her musical creations. The first album, Solex vs. the Hitmeister, was cobbled together using samples from albums that Esselink had been unable to sell in her store. Later albums would see her assembling tracks with samples she had informally recorded at live performances in addition to sampling records from her collection.

In 2001, Solex released the album Low Kick And Hard Bop on the Matador label. She appeared on Gerling's album Head3cleaner/When Young Terrorists Chase the Sun that year, and she also appeared on The Go! Team's 2007 album Proof of Youth.

== Personal life ==
Esselink was raised in Voorschoten. Her father was a chemical engineer and her mother a painter.

== Discography ==
=== Albums ===
- Solex vs. the Hitmeister (1998), Matador
- Pick Up (1999), Matador
- Low Kick and Hard Bop (2001), Matador
- The Laughing Stock of Indie Rock (2004), Arena Rock)
- In the Fishtank 13 (2005) – Solex with Maarten Altena Ensemble (M.A.E.); as a part of the In the Fishtank project
- Amsterdam Throwdown King Street Showdown! (2010), BronzeRat – Solex, Cristina Martinez and Jon Spencer
- Solex Ahoy! The Sound Map of the Netherlands (2013), BronzeRat / Seriés Aphōnos

=== EPs ===
- Athens, Ohio (2000), Matador
- Solex (2005), JeBu Records)

=== Singles ===
- "Solex All Licketysplit/Solex West" (1998), Matador
