= Metalanguage Records =

American record label

- Founded: 1978; 48 years ago
- Founder: Henry Kaiser, Larry Ochs
- Genre: Jazz, free jazz
- Country of origin: U.S.
- Location: Berkeley, California

Metalanguage Records was a record label in Berkeley, California, founded in 1978 by Henry Kaiser and Larry Ochs. It showcased Rova as well as many independent artists and produced the Rova Arts Festival in 1980.

== Discography ==
- ML 101 Rova Saxophone Quartet – Cinema Rovaté (LP) 1978
- ML 102 Henry Kaiser / Andrea Centazzo / Toshinori Kondo – Protocol (LP) 1979
- ML 104 Evan Parker / Greg Goodman – Abracadabra (LP, Album) 1978
- ML 105 Rova Saxophone Quartet / Henry Kaiser – Daredevils (LP) 1979
- ML 106 Rova Saxophone Quartet – The Removal Of Secrecy (LP) 1979
- ML 107 Fred Frith / Henry Kaiser – With Friends Like These (LP) 1979
- ML 108 Jim French With Diamanda Galás and Henry Kaiser – If Looks Could Kill (LP) 1979
- ML 109 Henry Kaiser – Aloha (2xLP) 1981
- ML 110 Evan Parker – At The Finger Palace (LP, Album) 1980
- ML 111 Henry Kaiser – Outside Pleasure (LP) 1980
- ML 113 Greg Goodman, Henry Kaiser, Jon Rose – The Construction Of Ruins – The Australian Site (LP) 1982
- ML 114 Derek Bailey, Christine Jeffrey – Views From Six Windows (LP, Album) 1981
- ML 116 Bruce Ackley, Greg Goodman, Henry Kaiser, Toshinori Kondo, Larry Ochs, Evan Parker, Jon Raskin, Andrew Voigt – Metalanguage Festival Of Improvised Music 1980 – Volume 1: The Social Set (LP) 1981
- ML 117 Derek Bailey, Evan Parker, Henry Kaiser, Larry Ochs, Jon Raskin, Greg Goodman, Toshinori Kondo, Andrew Voigt – Metalanguage Festival Of Improvised Music 1980 – Volume 2: The Science Set (LP) 1981
- ML 118 Rova – As Was (LP, Album) 1981
- ML 119 Diamanda Galas – Diamanda Galas (LP) 1984
- ML 122 Ustad Ali Akbar Khan – Halfmoon (LP) 1982
- ML 123 Fred Frith and Henry Kaiser – Who Needs Enemies? (LP) 1983
- ML 124 Henry Kaiser
