= Who Needs Enemies? (album) =

Studio album by Henry Kaiser and Fred Frith
- Released: 1983
- Recorded: October 1983
- Studio: Mobius Music, San Francisco
- Genre: Experimental music, free improvisation, noise
- Length: 42:30
- Label: Metalanguage (US)
- Producer: Henry Kaiser, Fred Frith and Oliver DiCicco

Henry Kaiser and Fred Frith chronology
With Friends Like These (1979)	Who Needs Enemies? (1983)	With Enemies Like These, Who Needs Friends? (1987)

Fred Frith chronology
French Gigs (1983)	Who Needs Enemies? (1983)	Nous Autres (1987)

Who Needs Enemies? is a 1983 studio album of improvised experimental music by Henry Kaiser and Fred Frith. It was recorded in October 1983, and was released on LP by Metalanguage Records later that year. It was Kaiser and Frith's second collaborative album, following on from their first, With Friends Like These in 1979.

In 1987 SST Records released With Enemies Like These, Who Needs Friends?, a CD with five tracks from With Friends Like These, seven tracks from Who Needs Enemies?, and four additional tracks from an unreleased live album by Frith and Kaiser. In 1999 Cuneiform Records released Friends & Enemies, a double-CD containing all the tracks from With Friends Like These and Who Needs Enemies?, plus unreleased live and studio material.

== Background ==
Frith and Kaiser began working together in 1978 when English avant-rock group Henry Cow, with whom Frith played guitar, lost their bass player. Frith decided to switch to bass guitar and recruited Kaiser to play guitar for the band. While Kaiser never joined the band permanently, he played guitar at several of their European concerts in April and June 1978. Frith and Kaiser's work together resulted in a partnership that gave rise to two collaborative albums, With Friends Like These and Who Needs Enemies?, and several concert performances.

== Track listing ==
All music by Henry Kaiser and Fred Frith, except where noted.

Side I
No.	Title	Length
1.	"Hard Time Killin' Floor Blues" (Nehemiah "Skip" James)	3:31
2.	"The Golden Eighties"	5:46
3.	"Everyday Objects"	2:49
4.	"The Kirghiz Light"	4:55
5.	"Special Rider Blues" (James)	4:31

Side II
No.	Title	Length
6.	"One of Nature's Mistakes"	2:07
7.	"Roy Rogers"	5:00
8.	"The Confession"	3:56
9.	"Objects Everyday"	2:50
10.	"Wool and Water"	4:12
11.	"The Trace"	2:53

Sources: Liner notes, Discogs, Fred Frith discography.

== Personnel ==
- Fred Frith – electric and acoustic guitars, 4 and 6 string bass guitars, LinnDrum programming, violin, marimba, piano, Casio 202 organ
- Henry Kaiser – electric and acoustic guitars, 6 string bass guitar, LinnDrum programming, electric sitar, banjo, piano

Sources: Liner notes, Discogs, Fred Frith discography.

=== Sound ===
- Recorded and mixed by Oliver DiCicco at Mobius Music, San Francisco
- Produced by Henry Kaiser, Fred Frith and Oliver DiCicco
- Mastered by Phil Brown
- Photography by Tina Curran

Sources: Liner notes, Discogs, Fred Frith discography.
