= Toby Burke =

Australian musician

Toby Francis X. Burke is an Australian musician who also performs as Horse Stories.

== Biography ==
He was born in Melbourne, Victoria, Australia. His music career began when he started performing under the band name, Horse Stories, as a guitarist, singer-songwriter in the US in 2000. The name is said to have been taken from an album by fellow Melbourne band Dirty Three.

Horse Stories' first record, Travelling Mercies (for Troubled Paths), was recorded with Texas-born drummer Clinton Stapleton in a friend's converted garage and released on UK label Loose Music in 2001. Burke and Stapleton went on to make two more Horse Stories records (with other musicians): One Hundred Waves and Everyone's A Photographer.

A prolific and productive writer, in 2004 Burke released a 'solo' record under his own name and in 2005 began recording experimental instrumental music as Perfect Black Swan, with the aim of collaborating with artists in other media.

Around 2011, he legally adopted his mother's maiden name and is now known as Toby Burke Hemingway (a name he had used for a collection of stories published in 2008). He currently lives in Los Angeles where he owns the menswear store Hemingway and Sons and still practices writing.

From NME magazine:

Although he had to up sticks from Australia to Los Angeles in order to get properly noticed, things are beginning to happen at last for Horse Stories mainman Toby Burke. Three albums in, the unfettered melancholy bliss of the man from Melbourne's electronica-tinged, dust-clouded tales are surely going to find themselves a wider audience. Well if there's any justice they will, anyway. The woozy psychedelia of ‘Firewall’ and the tortured beauty of ‘The Wheels’ recall Wilco’s recent awesome studio-bound experimentation and REM at their most coun-trified respectively. Really, there's no higher praise than that.

== Discography ==
=== Albums ===
Horse Stories

- Travelling Mercies (For Troubled Paths) (June 2001, Loose Music)
- One Hundred Waves (2003, Loose Music & Non Zero Records)
- Everyone's a Photographer (2005, Non Zero Records)
- November, November (2010, Perfect Black Swan)

Toby Burke

- Winsome Lonesome (April 2005, Loose Music & Cavalier Records)
- Mexico City (2011, Perfect Black Swan)

Perfect Black Swan

- 1 (2007, Ambulance Discs)

=== Singles ===
Horse Stories

- "Amber Lights" (December 2005, Loose Music)
