= With Friends Like These (album) =

Studio album by Fred Frith and Henry Kaiser
- Released: 1979
- Recorded: July 8, 11 and 17, 1979
- Studio: Mobius Music, San Francisco
- Genre: Experimental music, free improvisation, noise
- Length: 42:10
- Label: Metalanguage (US)
- Producer: Fred Frith and Henry Kaiser

Fred Frith and Henry Kaiser chronology
With Friends Like These (1979)	Who Needs Enemies? (1983)

Fred Frith chronology
Guitar Solos (1974)	With Friends Like These (1979)	Gravity (1980)

With Friends Like These is a 1979 studio album of improvised experimental music by Fred Frith and Henry Kaiser. It was recorded in July 1979, and was released on LP by Metalanguage Records later that year. It was Frith and Kaiser's first collaborative album, and was followed in 1983 by Who Needs Enemies?

In 1987 SST Records released With Enemies Like These, Who Needs Friends?, a CD with five tracks from With Friends Like These, seven tracks from Who Needs Enemies?, and four additional tracks from an unreleased live album by Frith and Kaiser. In 1999 Cuneiform Records released Friends & Enemies, a double-CD containing all the tracks from With Friends Like These and Who Needs Enemies?, plus unreleased live and studio material.

== Background ==
Frith and Kaiser began working together in 1978 when English avant-rock group Henry Cow, with whom Frith played guitar, lost their bass player. Frith decided to switch to bass guitar and recruited Kaiser to play guitar for the band. While Kaiser never joined the band permanently, he played guitar at several of their European concerts in April and June 1978. Frith and Kaiser's work together resulted in a partnership that gave rise to two collaborative albums, With Friends Like These and Who Needs Enemies?, and several concert performances.

== Reception ==
Professional ratings
Review scores
Source	Rating
AllMusic	3/5 stars

In a review in AllMusic, Dean McFarlane called With Friends Like These "[a]n extraordinary collaboration between two of avant-garde's most respected guitarists". He described much of the album as "chaotic experimental noise", but added that "traditional virtuosity" also features prominently. McFarlane concluded that With Friends Like These showcases some of Frith and Kaiser's "most striking performances", and demands repeated listening, which, he said, is unusual for this type of music.

Also writing in AllMusic, Rick Anderson described With Friends Like These as "one of the defining documents of the downtown avant-garde scene". He said Frith and Kaiser's improvised duets "essentially redefined the sound of the guitar".

== Track listing ==
All music by Fred Frith and Henry Kaiser.

Side A
No.	Title	Length
1.	"It Moves ..."	2:00
2.	"The Changing of Names"	5:45
3.	"It Sings"	5:40
4.	"Believing What We Read"	3:00
5.	"...But Does It Swing?"	3:30

Side B
No.	Title	Length
6.	"Twisted Memories Give Way to the Angry Present"	3:50
7.	"Black Glass"	5:30
8.	"Third Rail"	3:25
9.	"Three Languages"	9:30

Tracks 2, 6 and 7 are guitar duets recorded with no overdubbing.

Sources: Liner notes, Discogs, Fred Frith discography.

== Personnel ==
- Fred Frith – electric guitars, etc
- Henry Kaiser – electric guitars, etc

Sources: Liner notes, Discogs, Fred Frith discography.

=== Sound ===
- Recorded and mixed by Oliver DiCicco at Mobius Music, San Francisco
- Produced by Fred Frith and Henry Kaiser
- Mastered by Phil Brown at Warner Brothers Studio, Hollywood

Sources: Liner notes, Discogs, Fred Frith discography.
