= Pinback (album) =

Studio album by Pinback
- Released: October 5, 1999
- Recorded: 1998–1999
- Genre: Indie rock; slowcore
- Length: 42:44
- Label: Ace Fu Records
- Producer: Armistead Burwell Smith IV

Pinback chronology
Pinback (1999)	Some Voices (EP) (2000)

Professional ratings
Review scores
Source	Rating
AllMusic	link
Pitchfork	7.2/10 link

Pinback (also known as This Is a Pinback CD) is the debut album by the indie rock band Pinback. There are at least two different versions of the album. The first version was released by Ace Fu Records on October 12, 1999. Another was released that same year in Europe by Cutty Shark Records. In the latter version two new tracks were added and the track ordering was also modified. Both "Versailles" and 'Byzantine" would later appear on the compilation, "Nautical Antiques".

The song "Hurley" samples drums from the song "It's Expected I'm Gone" by Minutemen (George Hurley was that band's drummer).

The song "Shag" samples drums from the song "Shaggs' Own Thing (Vocal Version)" by the Shaggs.

== Track listings ==
=== Ace Fu Records version ===
1. "Tripoli" – 4:30
2. "Hurley" – 3:55
3. "Charborg" – 3:28
4. "Chaos Engine" – 3:38
5. "Shag" – 3:05
6. "Loro" – 3:33
7. "Crutch" – 4:31
8. "Rousseau" – 5:08
9. "Lyon" – 5:18
10. "Montaigne" – 5:38

=== Cutty Shark Records version ===
1. "Tripoli" – 4:30
2. "Hurley" – 3:55
3. "Charborg" – 3:28
4. "Chaos Engine" – 3:38
5. "Shag" – 3:06
6. "Lyon" – 5:20
7. "Loro" – 3:37
8. "Crutch" – 4:32
9. "Versailles" – 3:36
10. "Rousseau" – 5:09
11. "Byzantine" – 3:43
12. "Montaigne" – 5:37
