= 1 (The Black Heart Procession album) =

Studio album by The Black Heart Procession
- Released: January 1, 1998
- Genre: Indie rock
- Length: 47:59
- Label: Headhunter
- Producer: Ryan Hadlock, The Black Heart Procession

The Black Heart Procession chronology
| 1 (1998) | 2 (1999) |

1 is the debut studio album by the American indie band The Black Heart Procession. It was released on January 1, 1998, by Headhunter Records.

== Reception ==
Professional ratings
Review scores
| Source | Rating |
|---|---|
| Allmusic | 3.5/5 stars |

Ned Raggett from AllMusic rated the album 3.5 stars out of 5 and called the album "a lovely melancholia that avoids self-pity for deliberate reflection and consideration."

== Track listing ==
All tracks by Pall Jenkins

1. "The Waiter" – 4:15
2. "The Old Kind of Summer" – 4:12
3. "Release My Heart" – 4:20
4. "Even Thieves Couldn't Lie" – 4:47
5. "Blue Water-Black Heart" – 3:47
6. "Heart Without a Home" – 4:57
7. "The Winter My Heart Froze" – 0:54
8. "Stitched to My Heart" – 5:28
9. "Square Heart" – 3:46
10. "In a Tin Flask" – 4:08
11. "A Heart the Size of a Horse" – 7:25

Note: First pressing of this album in LP format was on clear vinyl.

== Personnel ==
- Joe Hadlock – Mixing
- Ryan Hadlock – Producer, Engineer, Mixing
- Pall A. Jenkins – Organ, Guitar, Vocals, Saw, Waterphone, Layout Concept
- Tobias Nathaniel – Bass, Guitar, Piano, Xylophone
- Nick Ott – Photography
- Mario Rubalcaba – Drums
- Jason Soares – Layout Concept
- Jen Wood – Vocals
- Satoru Yoshioka – Photography
