= Friends Like These (play) =

Play

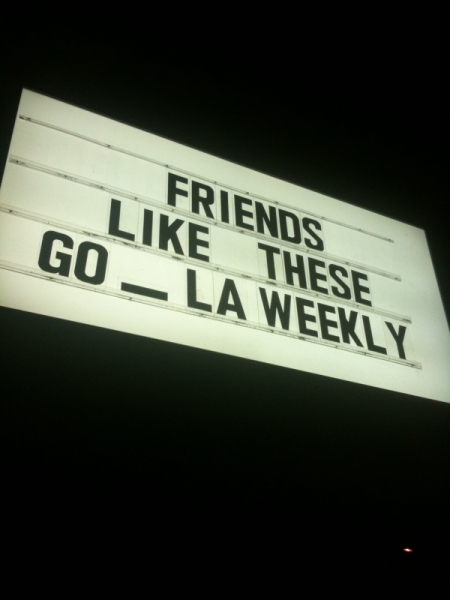
- Marquee of The Sherry Theatre during the World Premiere run of "Friends Like These" in 2009.
- Written by: Gregory Crafts
- Characters: Garrett; Diz; Bryan; Nicole; Jesse
- Original language: English
- Subject: school shooting, bullying, school violence, escapism, relationships, identity, LARPing, geek culture, stereotypes
- Genre: Drama
- Setting: Post-Columbine Suburbia, USA

Premiere
- Date premiered: September 11, 2009
- Place premiered: The Sherry Theatre
- Official website

Friends Like These is an American stage play written by Gregory Crafts, which premiered in 2009 in North Hollywood, California.

Set in the Spring of 2000, one year after the massacre at Columbine High School, Friends Like These follows the complex relationships between five students at the fictional Piedmont High School, and the circumstances that drive one of them to commit a shooting of their own.

== Characters ==
=== Garrett ===
A sullen seventeen-year-old sophomore misfit clad in a black duster, Garrett exists on the fringe of Piedmont High School's social sphere. Constantly antagonized and ostracized, he lives for weekends "camping" with his friends Diz and Bryan, where they escape to Haven, the fantasy world setting of their favorite LARP game.

=== Diz ===
Fifteen-year-old Danielle Watts prefers to go by the name Diz, a moniker inspired by her favorite Tiny Toon. Clad in baggy jeans and an oversized hoodie, Diz's personality is as dark and prickly as the spiked choker she wears.

=== Bryan ===
At sixteen, Bryan has figured out how to be everybody's best friend. A social butterfly, Bryan feels equally at home with Garrett and Diz on the field of battle at Haven, their favorite LARP, as he does in the locker room with Jesse and the rest of Piedmont's Varsity Wrestling team.

=== Nicole ===
Far from the stereotypical "Queen Bee" cheerleader, sixteen year old sophomore Nicole exhibits the wit and wisdom of a woman well beyond her years. After dumping her boyfriend, Jesse, for cheating on her, Nicole strikes up an unlikely relationship with Garrett.

=== Jesse ===
Jesse is a seventeen-year-old Junior whose jocular swagger is replaced by a giant chip on his shoulder after he's dumped by Nicole after she finds him getting intimate with her best friend.

== Critical reception ==
According to Deborah Klugman of LA Weekly, "Playwright Gregory Crafts’ drama is billed as a show about teen violence, conjuring images of gangs with guns or distraught loners firing wildly into a crowd of peers. In fact, while the latter event eventually finds its way into Crafts’ story, that's not its central focus. Instead, the play is mostly about some of the pernicious perils of adolescence — specifically the targeting of geeks by jocks, and the painful experience of the outcast in a teen community worshipful of its own rigid standard of 'coolness.'”

While the Columbine massacre has inspired many novels, films, and TV episodes, Ben Trawick-Smith of NYTheatre.com points out that "Unlike previous fictionalizations, however, Gregory Crafts's play softens the sensationalistic aspects of the tragedy. Far from being confrontational, the piece is a gentle drama about the instability of adolescence and the trauma of young love."

Critic Steven Stanley of StageSceneLA asserts "Though no two school shootings are alike, and Friends Like These gives us only one of them, it succeeds at the very least in helping us understand what might provoke a tormented adolescent to do the unthinkable, and the years between its 2009 premiere and now have only made it more relevant."

According to theatre critic Kevin Delin, the material is dated: "The play is... set in a pre-digital high school. Smartphones, ubiquitous on any campus today, are totally absent. There is also no mention of social media – which has become quite an effective tool for 21st century bullying – or YouTube – which has become the preferred place for broadcasting emotions. And, sadly, today’s students are more keenly aware of the possibility of a school shooting with lockdown drills as familiar as fire drills. [...] Given present trends, it is an unsettling thought that Crafts will likely need to revise and update Friends Like These for years to come." However, other critics, such as Tracey Paleo of Gia On the Move, assess that the piece is not dated, but still relatable and emotionally relevant to audiences of all ages, despite being set in the year 2000, arguing that "...the level of emotional intelligence, language and teen experientiality of the material is pretty spot on, thus, important enough to sit through and relevant as all hell."

== Production history ==
| Opening Date | Theatre | City | Producer | Director | Critic's Pick? | Notes |
|---|---|---|---|---|---|---|
| September 11, 2009 | The Sherry Theatre | North Hollywood, California | Theatre Unleashed | Sean Fitzgerald & Vance Roi Reyes | L.A. Weekly: "GO" | World Premiere |
| August 24, 2010 | The Cherry Pit | New York, New York | Theatre Unleashed | Sean Fitzgerald | Named one of the New York Observer's "Five Things We Love This Week" | Official Selection: 2010 New York International Fringe Festival |
| June 7, 2014 | The Elephant Stage | Hollywood, California | Theatre Unleashed & Mad Magpie | Wendy Gough Soroka | Stage Raw Recommended; The Lemon Lounge Teen Critics Pick; "Worth The Ticket" - Gia On the Move | Part of the 2014 Hollywood Fringe Festival |

== Awards and honors ==
World Premiere Production, The Sherry Theatre (North Hollywood, Los Angeles)

| Year | Award | Category | Nominee | Result |
|---|---|---|---|---|
| 2009 | Valley Theatre Awards | Best Ensemble (Comedy or Drama) | Matthew Scott Montgomery (Garrett), Ryan J. Hill (Bryan), Sari Sanchez (Diz), Sarah Smick (Nicole), Alex Yee (Jesse) | Nominated |

Hollywood Fringe Festival, The Elephant Theatre (Hollywood, Los Angeles)

| Year | Award | Category | Nominee | Result |
|---|---|---|---|---|
| 2014 | Hollywood Fringe Festival Community Award | Top of the Fringe | | Nominated |
| 2014 | Hollywood Fringe Festival Community Award | The Fringe Ensemble Theatre Award | Scott Sharma (Garrett), Sean Casey Flanagan (Bryan), Sammi Lappin (Diz), Parissa Koo (Nicole), Lee Pollero (Jesse) | Nominated |
| 2014 | The ENCORE! Producers Award | | | Won |
| 2014 | StageSceneLA Scenie Awards | Memorable Sound Design | Corwin Evans | Won |
