= The Inevitable Past Is the Future Forgotten =

Studio album by Three Mile Pilot
- Released: September 28, 2010
- Recorded: 2010
- Genre: Indie rock
- Length: 53:15
- Label: Temporary Residence
- Producer: Three Mile Pilot

Three Mile Pilot chronology
Songs From an Old Town We Once Knew (2000)	The Inevitable Past Is the Future Forgotten (2010)	Maps (2012)

Professional ratings
Aggregate scores
Source	Rating
Metacritic	(75/100)
Review scores
Source	Rating
Allmusic	3/5 stars
Alternative Press	3/5 stars
Pitchfork Media	(7.2/10)
PopMatters	(8/10)

The Inevitable Past Is the Future Forgotten is the fourth studio album by Three Mile Pilot, released on September 28, 2010 by Temporary Residence Limited. It was the first full-length album the band released since 1997's Another Desert, Another Sea.

== Track listing ==
All lyrics are written by Pall Jenkins; all music is composed by Pall Jenkins, Armistead Burwell Smith IV and Tom Zinser

No.	Title	Length
1.	"Battle"	4:32
2.	"Still Alive"	4:53
3.	"Grey Clouds"	4:52
4.	"Same Mistake"	4:04
5.	"What I Lose"	5:00
6.	"Left in Vain"	3:55
7.	"The Threshold"	4:44
8.	"One Falls Away"	4:11
9.	"Days of Wrath"	4:06
10.	"Planets"	3:41
11.	"What's in the Air"	5:45
12.	"The Premonition"	3:32

== Personnel ==
Adapted from The Inevitable Past Is the Future Forgotten liner notes.

Three Mile Pilot

- Pall Jenkins – vocals, guitar
- Armistead Burwell Smith IV – bass guitar, backing vocals
- Tom Zinser – drums, accordion

Additional musicians

- Tobias Nathaniel – piano (7)
- Matt Resovich – violin (8)

Production and additional personnel

- Kris Poulin – mixing
- Three Mile Pilot – record producer, recording

== Release history ==
Region	Date	Label	Format	Catalog
United States	2010	Temporary Residence	CD, LP	TRR166
