= Six (The Black Heart Procession album) =

Studio album by The Black Heart Procession
- Released: October 6, 2009
- Recorded: 2007–2009
- Studio: Stereo Disguise Recording Laboratories, San Diego
- Genre: Indie rock
- Length: 50:50
- Label: Temporary Residence Limited
- Producer: Tobias Nathaniel; Pall Jenkins

The Black Heart Procession chronology
The Spell (2006)	Six (2009)

Professional ratings
Aggregate scores
Source	Rating
Metacritic	70/100
Review scores
Source	Rating
Drowned in Sound	8/10
Pitchfork Media	6.6/10
PopMatters	6/10
Slant	2.5/5 stars

Six is the sixth studio album by The Black Heart Procession, released on October 6, 2009. This album was made after their switch to their new label, Temporary Residence Limited. This album incorporated some new elements into the Black Heart Procession's macabre style.

== Track listing ==
All tracks are written by Pall Jenkins and Tobias Nathaniel.

No.	Title	Length
1.	"When You Finish Me"	3:30
2.	"Wasteland"	4:07
3.	"Witching Stone"	3:35
4.	"Rats"	3:57
5.	"Heaven and Hell"	4:28
6.	"Drugs"	2:55
7.	"All My Steps"	4:07
8.	"Forget My Heart"	4:30
9.	"Liar's Ink"	5:07
10.	"Suicide"	3:54
11.	"Back to the Underground"	4:00
12.	"Last Chance"	4:14
13.	"Iri Sulu"	4:30
Total length:		50:50

== Personnel ==
The Black Heart Procession

- Tobias Nathaniel – vocals, instrumentation, recording, production, artwork
- Pall Jenkins – vocals, instrumentation, recording, production, artwork

Additional personnel

- Matt Resovich – violin (1, 4, 7, 8, 10, 11, 13)
- Brad Lee – bass, drums, additional engineering (9)
- Mario Rubalacaba – drums (10)
- Joshua Quon – bass (10)
