= Information Retrieved =

Studio album by Pinback
- Released: October 16, 2012
- Recorded: S.D.R.L. Studios, San Diego, California
- Genres: Indie rock; experimental rock; progressive rock; math rock
- Length: 38:03
- Labels: Temporary Residence Ltd. (TRR 179)

Pinback chronology
Autumn of the Seraphs (2007)	Information Retrieved (2012)

Singles from Information Retrieved
- 1. "Proceed to Memory" Released: August 15, 2012; 2. "Sherman" Released: August 16, 2012

Professional ratings
Aggregate scores
Source	Rating
Metacritic	72/100
Review scores
Source	Rating
A.V. Club	B−
Alarm Magazine	favorable
AllMusic	4/5 stars
Associated Press	favorable
BBC	favorable
Consequence of Sound	1.5/5 stars
Earbuddy	(7.0/10.0)
Paste	(8/10)
Pitchfork	(6.8/10)
PopMatters	7/10 stars
Prefix	7/10 stars
Punknews.org	3.5/5 stars

Information Retrieved is the fifth full-length studio album by the San Diego indie rock band Pinback, released on October 16, 2012, through Temporary Residence Ltd.

== Background ==
On August 15, 2012, the album's first single "Proceed to Memory" was made available for streaming on Rolling Stone. The album's second single, "His Phase", was made available for streaming on Pitchfork on September 20, 2012. Eventually, the entire album was made available for streaming for a limited time on Soundcheck.

On October 16, 2012 Information Retrieved and the music video for the album track "Sherman" were simultaneously released. The video was directed by Matt Hoyt and was inspired by the 1962 sci-fi film Planeta Bur.

== Track listing ==
All tracks are written by Rob Crow and Zach Smith of Pinback.

No.	Title	Length
1.	"Proceed to Memory"	3:51
2.	"Glide"	3:58
3.	"Drawstring"	3:44
4.	"Sherman"	3:36
5.	"His Phase"	3:17
6.	"Diminished"	3:53
7.	"True North"	3:54
8.	"A Request"	3:55
9.	"Denslow, You Idiot!"	2:59
10.	"Sediment"	4:56
Total length:		38:03

iTunes digital download bonus track
No.	Title	Length
11.	"CLOAD "Q""	4:03
Total length:		42:06

Amazon.com digital download bonus track
No.	Title	Length
11.	"Thee Srum Proggitt"	4:39
Total length:		42:42

== Personnel ==
Information Retrieved album personnel adapted from AllMusic.

Primary musicians (Pinback)

- Rob Crow – Art Conception, Collage, Drum Programming, Drums, Guitar, Keyboards, Mixing, Engineer, Vocals, composer
- Zach Smith – Bass, Drum Programming, Guitar, Keyboards, Mixing, Engineer, Percussion, Vocals, composer

Additional musicians

- Anton Patzner – Violin
- Lewis Patzner – Cello
- Chris Prescott – Drums

Production

- Ben Moore – Remixing
- Roger Seibel – Mastering

Album artwork

- Daniel Danger – Illustrations
- Jeremy DeVine – Layout
- Matt Hoyt – Photography

== Charts ==
Chart	Peak position
Billboard 200	71
Billboard Rock Albums	30
Billboard Independent Albums	16
Billboard Alternative Albums	20
Billboard Tastemaker Albums	19
Belgian Albums (Ultratop Flanders)	177
