= Some Voices (EP) =

EP by Pinback
- Released: September 5, 2000
- Genre: Lo-fi
- Length: 15:57
- Label: Absolutely Kosher

Pinback chronology
Pinback (1999)	Some Voices (2000)	Blue Screen Life (2001)

Professional ratings
Review scores
Source	Rating
Pitchfork	7.1/10

Some Voices is an EP by indie rock band Pinback.

== Track listing ==
1. "Some Voices" – 3:16
2. "Trainer" – 2:43
3. "Manchuria" – 2:41
4. "June" – 7:17
