= Three (The Black Heart Procession album) =

Studio album by The Black Heart Procession
- Released: September 5, 2000
- Genre: Indie rock
- Length: 46:22
- Label: Touch & Go

The Black Heart Procession chronology
2 (1999)	Three (2000)	Amore Del Tropico (2002)

Professional ratings
Review scores
Source	Rating
AllMusic	3/5 stars
Pitchfork	7.8/10

Three is the third studio album by the American indie rock band The Black Heart Procession. It was released on September 5, 2000, on Touch and Go Records.

== Track listing ==
1. "We Always Knew" - 5:26
2. "Guess I'll Forget You" - 4:39
3. "Once Said at the Fires" - 4:13
4. "Waterfront (The Sinking Road)" - 5:45
5. "Till We Have to Say Goodbye" - 2:49
6. "I Know Your Ways" - 4:11
7. "Never from This Heart" - 4:46
8. "A Heart Like Mine" - 3:25
9. "The War Is Over" - 3:51
10. "On Ships of Gold" - 7:17
