= Henry Kaiser (musician) =

American guitarist, film director, and scientific diver

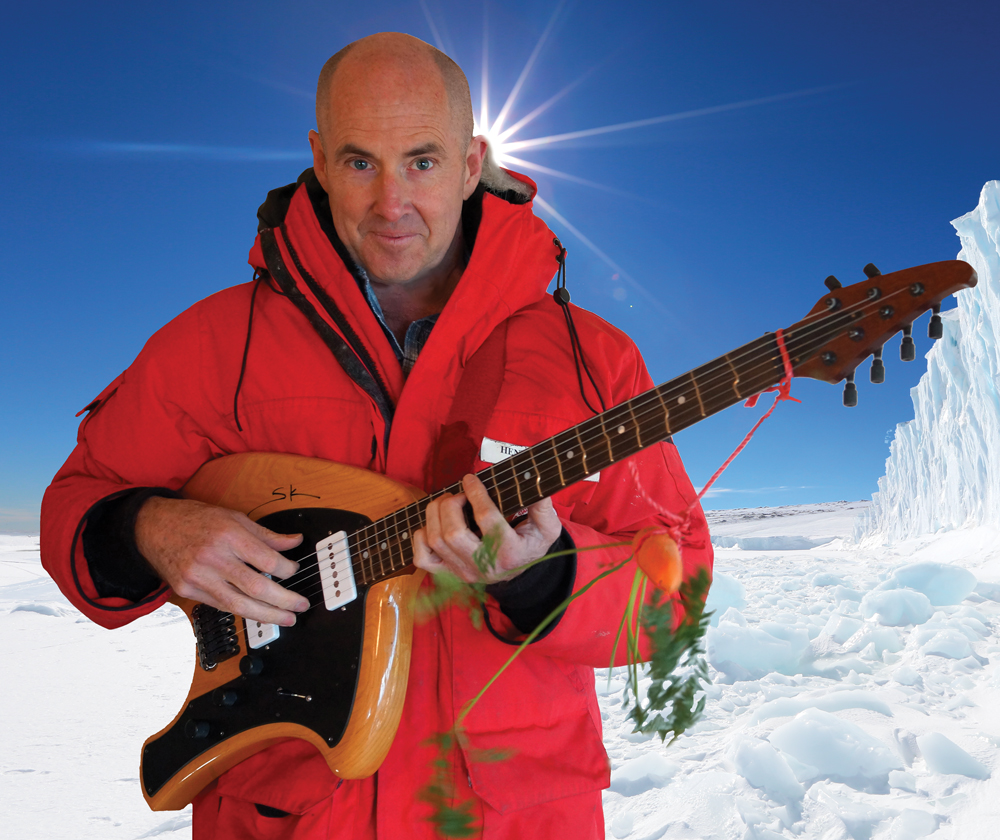
- Kaiser with Timberdance Swamp Angel Guitar

Background information
- Born: September 19, 1952 (age 74); Oakland, California, U.S.
- Origin: San Francisco Bay Area
- Genres: Free improvisation, jazz, rock, electronic
- Occupations: Musician, composer, photographer, research diver
- Instrument: Guitar
- Years active: 1970s–present
- Labels: Metalanguage, Tzadik, SST, Rhino, Windham Hill, Shanachie, Cuneiform
- Website: www.henrykaiserguitar.com

Henry Kaiser (born September 19, 1952) is an American guitarist and composer, known as an idiosyncratic soloist, a sideman, an ethnomusicologist, and a film score composer. Recording and performing prolifically in many styles of music, Kaiser is a fixture in the San Francisco Bay Area music scene. He is considered a member of the "second generation" of American free improvisers. He is married to Canadian artist Brandy Gale. He is the son of Henry J. Kaiser Jr. and the grandson of industrialist Henry J. Kaiser.

== Biography ==
In 1977, Kaiser founded Metalanguage Records with Larry Ochs (Rova Saxophone Quartet) and Greg Goodman. In 1979 he recorded With Friends Like These with Fred Frith, a collaboration which continued over the next 20 years. In 1983 they recorded Who Needs Enemies, and in 1987 the compilation album With Enemies Like These, Who Needs Friends? They joined with fellow experimental musicians John French, and English folk-rocker Richard Thompson to form French Frith Kaiser Thompson for two eclectic albums, Live, Love, Larf & Loaf (1987) and Invisible Means (1990). In 1999 Frith and Kaiser released Friends & Enemies, a compilation of their two Metalanguage albums along with additional material from 1984 and 1999.

In 1991, Kaiser went to Madagascar with guitarist David Lindley. They recorded roots music with Malagasy musicians and discovered music that, he says, "changed us radically and permanently". Three volumes of this music were released by Shanachie under the title A World Out of Time. In 1994 he made a similar trip to Norway, again with Lindley, recording music that was released as Sweet Sunny North (2 volumes, 1994 and 1996).

Since 1998, Kaiser has been collaborating with trumpeter Wadada Leo Smith in the "Yo Miles!" project, releasing a series of tributes to Miles Davis's 1970s electric music. This shifting aggregation has included musicians from the worlds of rock (guitarists Nels Cline, Mike Keneally and Chris Muir, drummer Steve Smith), jazz (saxophonists Greg Osby and John Tchicai), avant-garde (keyboardist John Medeski, guitarist Elliott Sharp), and Indian classical music (tabla player Zakir Hussain).

Kaiser has appeared on more than 300 albums and scored dozens of TV shows and films, including Werner Herzog's Encounters at the End of the World (2007). He was nominated for a Grammy Award for his work on the Beautiful Dreamer tribute to Stephen Foster.

In 2001, Kaiser spent two and a half months in Antarctica on a National Science Foundation Antarctic Artists and Writers Program grant. He has subsequently returned for nine more visits to work as a research diver. His underwater camera work was featured in two Herzog films, The Wild Blue Yonder (2005) and Encounters at the End of the World (2007), which he also produced, and for which he and Lindley composed the score. Kaiser served as music producer for Herzog's Grizzly Man (2005). He was nominated for an Academy Award for his work as a producer on Encounters at the End of the World.

== Instruments and effects ==
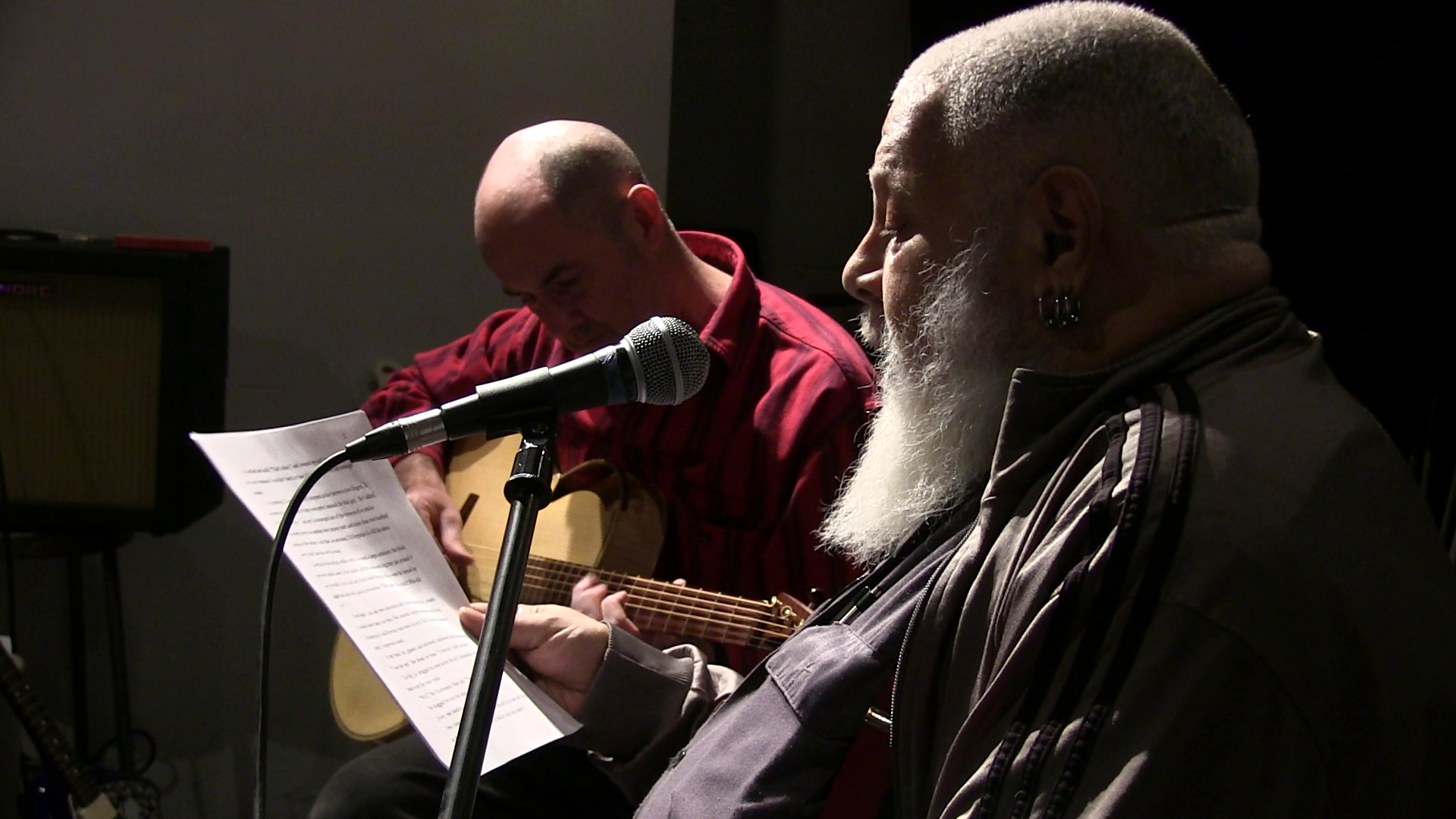
video still of performance by Samuel R. Delany and Henry Kaiser at the Stone

Kaiser "has amassed an immense collection of guitars, amplifiers, and effect pedals" to achieve "sonic diversity". A favorite of his is a Klein electric with Alembic pickups (his favorites), which he uses when traveling. He owns a Dumble handmade amplifier. He has been looping since at least 1984 (It's a Wonderful Life), initially with an MXR digital delay, and later with Lexicon equipment—he sets modulation rates to "either heart or breathing rate, because those are natural healing rhythm rates". He often uses two delays to provide three different voices. He is also an avid user of a large number of effects pedals including the Hall & Collins Echo unit and a range of fuzzes.

Kaiser has listed his essential effects as the Old World 1960 Compressor, Barber Tone Press, Origin Effects Slide Rig, Tech 21 Comptortion, Burns Buzzaround Clones, Tanabe Zenkudo or Dumkudo, Crazy Tube Circuits Starlight, Eventide Pitchfactor, Eventide Eclipse Harmonizer, TC Flashback, Red Panda Particle, and Neunaber Wet Reverb.

== Discography ==
=== As leader and co-leader ===
- Ice Death (Parachute, 1977)
- Protocol with Andrea Centazzo and Toshinori Kondo (Metalanguage, 1979)
- With Friends Like These with Fred Frith (Metalanguage, 1979)
- Outside Pleasure (Metalanguage, 1980)
- Aloha (Metalanguage, 1981)
- Who Needs Enemies? with Fred Frith (Metalanguage, 1983)
- Invite the Spirit (Celluloid, 1984)
- It's a Wonderful Life (Metalanguage, 1984)
- Name 164 (Spooky Pooch, 1985)
- Re-Marrying for Money (SST, 1986)
- Devil in the Drain (SST, 1987)
- Crazy Backwards Alphabet (SST, 1987)
- With Enemies Like These Who Needs Friends? with Fred Frith (SST, 1987)
- Live, Love, Larf & Loaf (Rhino, 1987)
- Those Who Know History Are Doomed to Repeat It (SST, 1988)
- Popular Science with Sergey Kuryokhin (Rykodisc, 1989)
- Heart's Desire (Reckless, 1989)
- Invisible Means (Demon, 1990)
- Hope You Like Our New Direction (Reckless, 1991)
- Tomorrow Knows Where You Live (Victo, 1991)
- A World Out of Time with David Lindley (Shanachie, 1992)
- The Five Heavenly Truths (FOT, 1993)
- The Psychedelic Guitar Circus with Steve Kimock, Harvey Mandel, and Freddie Roulette (Sky Ranch/Virgin, 1994)
- Acoustics (Victo, 1994)
- The Mistakes (Third Venture, 1995)
- The Siamese Stepbrothers (Cuneiform, 1995)
- The Sweet Sunny North with David Lindley (Shanachie, 1994)
- Eternity Blue (Shanachie, 1995)
- The Sweet Sunny North Vol. 2 with David Lindley (Shanachie, 1996)
- Second Sight (Shanachie, 1996)
- Yo Miles! with Wadada Leo Smith (Shanachie, 1998)
- Through (Materiali Sonori, 1999)
- Passwords with Paul Plimley, (Spool, 1999)
- Playola - Collection Of Curiosities For Airplay: 1977-2002 (self released 2002)
- Guitar Party (Gaff Music, 2003)
- Upriver (Cuneiform, 2005)
- Invite the Spirit 2006 (Tzadik, 2006)
- A Tribute to John Stevens and the SME (Balance Point Acoustics, 2006)
- Domo Arigato Derek-Sensei! (Balance Point Acoustics, 2006)
- Where Endless Meets Disappearing (Balance Point Acoustics, 2009)
- Buddhist Stories for Awakening (Dharma Radio, 2009)
- Plane Crash (ugEXPLODE, 2009)
- Ultraviolet Licorice (BLove Music, 2009)
- A Little Stroke Of Light (self released, 2010)
- Ninja Star Danger Rock (ugEXPLODE, 2011)
- Solo Acoustic on Beardsell Guitars (self released, 2011)
- Can't Stop to Boogie (P-Vine, 2011)
- Teuffel Tesla Duets (H(i)nds(i)ght, 2012)
- Kamura (ZA Discs, 2012)
- Encounters at the End of the World with David Lindley (Fractal Music, 2013)
- Requia and Other Improvisations for Guitar Solo (Tzadik, 2013)
- Garden Of Memory: Trance Guitar Solos Live Summer Solstice 2014 5-CD box (self-released)
- The Celestial Squid with Ray Russell (Cuneiform, 2015)
- Echoes for Sonny (Musso Music, 2015)
- Relations with Damon Smith (Balance Point Acoustics, 2015)
- Plane Crash Two (New Atlantis, 2015)
- Nearly Extinct (Balance Point Acoustics, 2016)
- A Rainbow for Riley (Fractal Music, 2016)
- Nazca Lines (Fractal Music, 2016)
- Indestrucible Fantasy (Fractal Music, 2016)
- Skip to the Solo (Public Eyesore, 2016)
- Nostalgia For Infinity (self-released, 2017)
- The Deep Unreal (Metalanguage, 2017)
- We Call All Times Soon (Split Rock, 2018)
- The Deep Unreal (Metalanguage, 2018)
- Wild Courses (Iluso, 2018)
- Five Times Surprise (Cuneiform, 2019)
- More Requia (Metalanguage, 2019)
- Problems Are Only Opportunities in Work Clothes (Fractal Music, 2020)
- The Lenoir Investigation (2022)
- Mahalo Nui (Metalanguage, 2023)
- The Lost Chord (Baritone Guitar Solos) (Metalanguage, 2024)
- Gateway To Strangeness (Metalanguage, 2026)

=== As sideman ===
With Andrea Centazzo

- Infinity Squared (Ictus, 2006)
- Guitars (Ictus, 2009)
- Ghidorah (Fractal Music, 2017)
- Above & Beyond Protocol (Metalanguage, 2020)

With Eugene Chadbourne

- Vol. Three: Guitar Trios (Parachute, 1977)
- School (Parachute, 1978)
- The Acquaduct (Rectangle, 1996)
- The Guitar Lesson (Victo, 1999)
- Wind Crystals: Guitar Duets by Wadada Leo Smith (Relative Pitch, 2019)

With Weasel Walter

- Revolt Music (ugEXPLODE, 2006)
- Apocalyptik Paranoia (ugEXPLODE, 2009)
- Large Group Performances 2007-2009 (ugEXPLODE, 2009)
- Invasion (ugEXPLODE, 2010)

With others

- Morgan Agren, Invisible Rays (7d Media, 2011)
- Derek Bailey, Wireforks (Shanachie, 1993)
- Bob Bralove, Positively Space Music (Fractal Music, 2017)
- Olie Brice, Binker Golding, N. O. Moore, Eddie Prévost, The Secret Handshake With Danger (Vol. One) (577, 2021)
- Brise-Glace, When in Vanitas (Skin Graft, 1994)
- Tania Chen, Megasonic Chapel (Fractal Music, 2015)
- Tania Chen, Ocean of Storms (Fractal Music, 2016)
- Nels Cline, Jazz Free (There 2012)
- Tom Constanten, Nightfall of Diamonds (Relix, 1992)
- The Flying Luttenbachers, Imminent Death (ugEXPLODE, 2019)
- Jim French, If Looks Could Kill (Metalanguage, 1979)
- John French, Waiting On the Flame (Demon, 1994)
- Fred Frith, Friends & Enemies (Cuneiform, 1999)
- The Golden Palominos, Omaha (Celluloid, 1985)
- The Golden Palominos, Visions of Excess (Celluloid, 1985)
- Vinny Golia, Healing Force (Cuneiform, 2007)
- Vinny Golia, Astral Plane Crash (Balance Point Acoustics, 2018)
- Ivar Grydeland, Into the Arctic Dreamtime (Rune Grammofon, 2020)
- Herbie Hancock, Hardrock (CBS, 1984)
- Herbie Hancock, Sound-System (Columbia, 1984)
- Jin Hi Kim, Sargeng (Ear-Rational 1990)
- Jin Hi Kim, KomunGuitar (What Next? 1993)
- Toshinori Kondo, Moose and Salmon (Music Gallery Editions, 1978)
- Henry Kuntz, Cross-Eyed Priest (Humming Bird, 1979)
- Sergey Kuryokhin, Popular Science (Rykodisc 1989)
- Lukas Ligeti, Lukas Ligeti & Beta Foly (Intuition, 1997)
- Material, Memory Serves (Elektra Musician, 1982)
- Material, For a Few Dollars More (Carrere, 1983)
- Tisziji Munoz, Auspicious Healing! (Anami Music, 2000)
- John Oswald, Improvised (Music Gallery Editions, 1978)
- John Oswald, Discosphere (ReR, 1991)
- Knut Reiersrud, Sub (Kirkelig Kulturverksted, 1999)
- Zoogz Rift, Island of Living Puke (SST, 1986)
- Zoogz Rift, Water II: At Safe Distance (SST, 1987)
- Terry Riley, 25th Anniversary Concert (New Albion, 1995)
- Rossy, One Eye On the Future One Eye On the Past (Shanachie, 1993)
- Rova Saxophone Quartet, Daredevils (Metalanguage, 1979)
- Rova Saxophone Quartet, Steve Lacy's Saxophone Special Revisited (Clean Feed, 2017)
- John Russell, The Dukes of Bedford (Fractal Music, 2020)
- Elliott Sharp, Electric Willie (Yellowbird, 2010)
- Everett Shock, Ghost Boys, (SST, 1988)
- Wadada Leo Smith, Dreams and Secrets (Anonymous, 2000)
- Wadada Leo Smith, Najwa (TUM, 2017)
- Richard Thompson, Watching the Dark (Hannibal, 1993)
- Michiyo Yagi, Decayed (Idiolect, 2017)
- John Zorn, Lacrosse (Tzadik, 1997)
