= Summer in Abaddon =

Studio album by Pinback
- Released: October 12, 2004
- Genre: Indie rock; experimental rock; electronic rock
- Length: 42:01
- Label: Touch & Go

Pinback chronology
Offcell (2003)	Summer in Abaddon (2004)	Nautical Antiques (2006)

Professional ratings
Review scores
Source	Rating
AllMusic	link
Pitchfork	8.1/10 link
PopMatters	positive link
Stylus Magazine	C+ link
Treble	positive link

Summer in Abaddon is the third full-length album by indie rock band Pinback released through Touch & Go on October 12, 2004. The album was recorded in the home studio of Zach Smith and Rob Crow.

== Track listing ==
No.	Title	Length
1.	"Non Photo-Blue"	3:43
2.	"Sender"	4:58
3.	"Syracuse"	3:49
4.	"Bloods on Fire"	4:12
5.	"Fortress"	4:10
6.	"This Red Book"	3:56
7.	"Soaked"	4:24
8.	"3X0"	4:00
9.	"The Yellow Ones"	3:36
10.	"AFK"	5:13
Total length:		42:01

iTunes digital download bonus track
No.	Title	Length
11.	"Scent"	3:34
Total length:		45:35

Japanese Version
No.	Title	Length
1.	"Non Photo-Blue"	3:43
2.	"Sender"	4:58
3.	"Syracuse"	3:49
4.	"Bloods on Fire"	4:12
5.	"Fortress"	4:10
6.	"This Red Book"	3:56
7.	"Soaked"	4:24
8.	"3X0"	4:00
9.	"Todo (bonus track)"	3:54
10.	"The Yellow Ones"	3:36
11.	"AFK"	5:13
Total length:		45:55

15th Anniversary Edition
No.	Title	Length
1.	"Non Photo-Blue"	3:43
2.	"Sender"	4:58
3.	"Syracuse"	3:49
4.	"Bloods on Fire"	4:12
5.	"Fortress"	4:10
6.	"This Red Book"	3:56
7.	"Soaked"	4:24
8.	"3X0"	4:00
9.	"Todo (bonus track)"	3:56
10.	"The Yellow Ones"	3:36
11.	"AFK"	5:13
12.	"Scent (bonus track)"	3:33
Total length:		49:30

== Charts ==
Chart	Peak position
Billboard 200	196
Billboard Top Heatseakers	9
Billboard Top Independent Albums	16
French Albums (SNEP)	164
Belgian Albums (Ultratop Flanders)	74
