= The Spell (The Black Heart Procession album) =

Studio album by The Black Heart Procession
- Released: May 9, 2006
- Recorded: SDRL, in San Diego, 2005
- Genre: Indie rock
- Length: 45:14
- Label: Touch & Go TG271
- Producer: The Black Heart Procession

The Black Heart Procession chronology
In the Fishtank 11 (2004)	The Spell (2006)	Six (2009)

Professional ratings
Aggregate scores
Source	Rating
Metacritic	73/100
Review scores
Source	Rating
AllMusic	4.5/5 stars
Pitchfork	8/10

The Spell is the fifth full-length album recorded by the indie rock band The Black Heart Procession.

The album was released by Touch and Go Records on May 9, 2006. The album was recorded and produced by the band in their new studio, SDRL, in San Diego. A video was made for the track "Not Just Words."

== Track listing ==
1. "Tangled" – 4:13
2. "The Spell" – 4:39
3. "Not Just Words" – 4:11
4. "The Letter" – 4:29
5. "The Replacement" – 3:57
6. "Return to Burn" – 4:23
7. "GPS" – 3:34
8. "The Waiter #5" – 4:04
9. "Places" – 3:51
10. "The Fix" – 4:09
11. "To Bring You Back" – 3:39

== Musicians ==
- Pall Jenkins — vocals; guitar (tracks 1, 3–5, 8, 9, 11), bass (tracks 2, 7, 10), organ (track 5), synthesizer (track 5), lap steel guitar (track 6), saw (track 8)
- Matt Resovich — violin (tracks 1–5, 8–11), electric piano (track 5), synthesizer (track 7), lap steel guitar (track 11)
- Tobias Nathaniel — piano (tracks 1, 3–6, 8, 9, 11), organ (tracks 1, 2, 6, 7, 10), bass (tracks 1, 8, 9, 11), guitar (tracks 2, 7, 10), tympani (track 8), Wurlitzer electric piano (track 10)
- Jimmy LaValle — piano (track 2), bass (tracks 3–6), reverb tank (track 8), organ (track 11)
- Joe Plummer — drums; percussion (track 3)
