= Offcell =

EP by Pinback
- Released: June 10, 2003
- Genre: Indie pop
- Length: 29:41
- Label: Absolutely Kosher

Pinback chronology
Blue Screen Life (2001)	Offcell (2003)	Summer in Abaddon (2004)

Professional ratings
Review scores
Source	Rating
Pitchfork	(8.5/10)
PopMatters	(Positive)

Offcell is an EP released by indie rock band Pinback.

== Track listing ==
1. "Microtonic Wave" - 4:58
2. "Victorius D" - 4:17
3. "Offcell" - 4:31
4. "B" - 4:51
5. "Grey Machine" - 11:08
