= Pinback =

American indie rock band

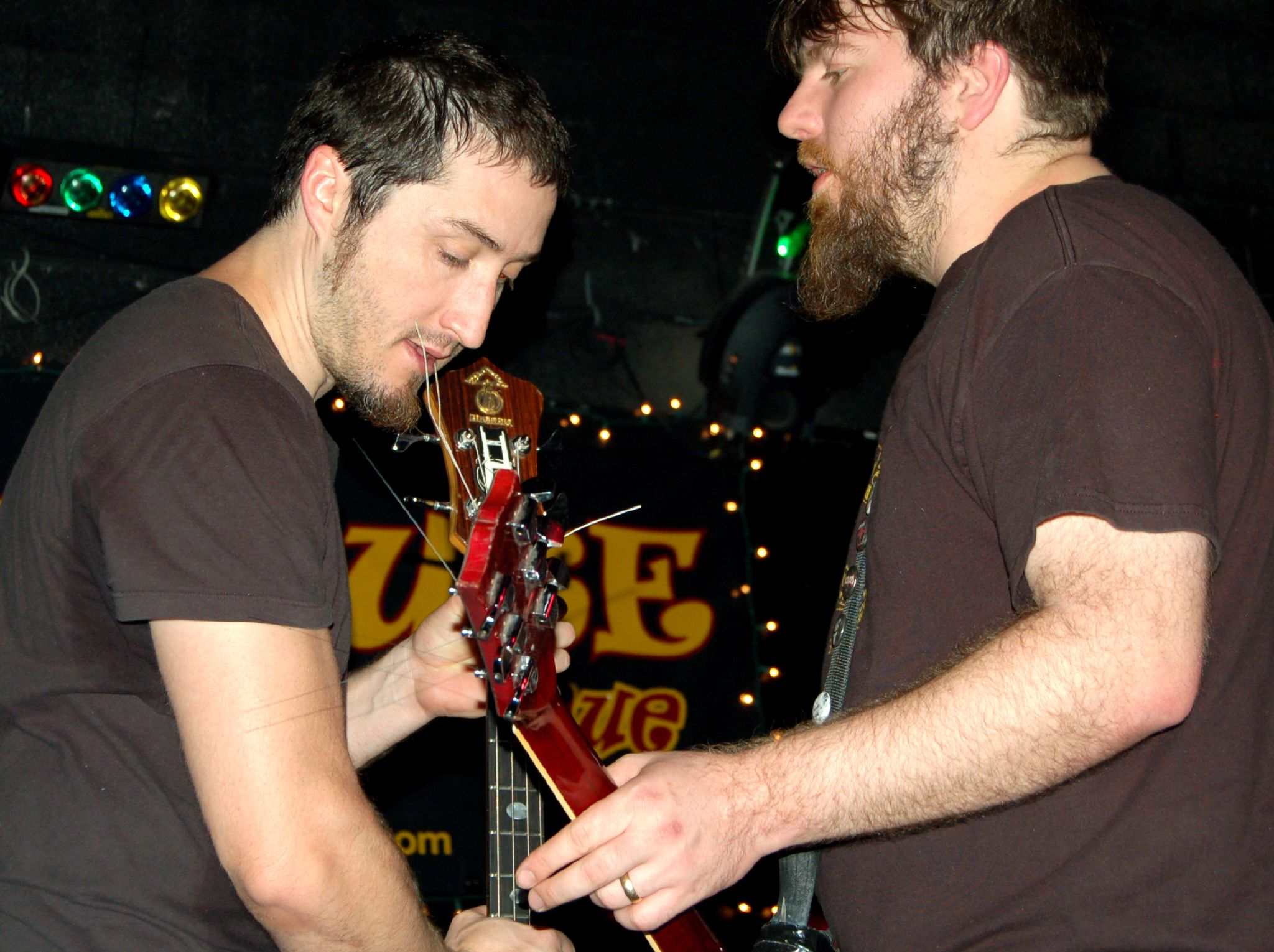
- Pinback performing at Clubhouse Music Venue in 2006. Left to right: Armistead Burwell Smith IV, Rob Crow.

Background information
- Origin: San Diego, California, U.S.
- Genres: Indie rock; indie pop; progressive rock; math rock
- Years active: 1998–present
- Labels: Temporary Residence; Touch and Go; Absolutely Kosher; Ace Fu
- Members: Rob Crow; Armistead Burwell Smith IV; Chris Prescott
- Past members: Braden Diotte; Terrin Durfey; Tom Zinser; Ryan Bromley; Cameron Jones; Kenseth Thibideau; Brent Asbury; Gabriel Voiles; Dmitri Dziensuwski; Donny Van Zandt; Thatcher Orbitachi
- Website: www.pinback.com

Pinback is an American indie rock band from San Diego, California. The band was formed in 1998 by singers, songwriters and multi-instrumentalists Armistead Burwell Smith IV and Rob Crow, who have been its two constant members. They have released five studio albums and several other releases.

== History and origin ==
The band's moniker is a reference to a character in the 1974 film Dark Star (played by Dan O'Bannon). Audio samples from this film are used frequently in the band's early works.

The band's debut album, Pinback, was released on October 12, 1999, through Ace Fu Records. A European version, released the same year through Cutty Shark Records, included two additional tracks.

In 2004, Pinback signed to Touch and Go Records. They released their third album, Summer in Abaddon, later that year. In 2006, the band released a collection of rarities, entitled Nautical Antiques. Pinback's fourth full-length album, Autumn of the Seraphs, was released on September 11, 2007. They appeared live in a nationally broadcast interview and played a couple of songs on NPR's Talk of the Nation on October 8, 2007.

On April 1, 2009, Pinback announced they were working on a new album that would be released by Temporary Residence Ltd. Their fifth studio album, Information Retrieved, was released October 16, 2012. On August 15, 2012, Pinback released the song "Proceed to Memory" from Information Retrieved free to play through RollingStone.com.

Smith and Crow have been the band's two consistent members. They are typically joined by drummer Chris Prescott; Tom Zinser and Mario Rubalcaba have previously contributed drums. Other past members of the Pinback live band include: Erik Hoversten, Braden Diotte, Terrin Durfey, Ryan Bromley, Cameron Jones, Kenseth Thibideau, Brent Asbury, Gabriel Voiles, Dmitri Dziensuwski, Donny Van Zandt, and Thatcher Orbitashi.

== Discography ==
=== Studio albums ===
- Pinback (1999)
- Blue Screen Life (2001)
- Summer in Abaddon (2004) U.S. No. 196
- Autumn of the Seraphs (2007) U.S. No. 69
- Information Retrieved (2012) U.S. No. 71

=== Compilations ===
- Nautical Antiques (2006)
- Some Offcell Voices (2017)

=== Extended plays ===
- Live in Donny's Garage (2000)
- Some Voices (2000)
- This Is a Pinback Tour E.P. (2001)
- More or Less Live in a Few Different Places (2002)
- Arrive Having Eaten (2003)
- Offcell (2003)
- Too Many Shadows (2004)
- ascii E.P. (2008)
- Information Retrieved, Pt. A (2011)
- Information Retrieved Pt. B (2011)

=== Singles ===
- "Loro" (1999)
- "Tripoli" (2000)
- "Penelope" (2001)
- "Fortress" (2004)
- "Todo" (2004)
- "From Nothing to Nowhere" (2007)
- "Proceed to Memory" (2012)
- "Sherman" (2012)
- "ROJI (Roshomon Effect)" (2018)

== Members ==
Current

- Rob Crow – vocals, guitar (1998–present)
- Armistead Burwell Smith IV vocals, bass (1998–present)
- Chris Prescott – drums (2005–present)

Former

- Tom Zinser – drums (1998–2003)
- Thatcher Orbitachi – keyboards (1999)
- Donny Van Zandt – keyboards (1999)
- Dmitri Dziensuwski – keyboards (1999)
- Gabriel Voiles – bass (1999)
- Brent Asbury – keyboards (2000–2002)
- Ryan Bromley – guitar, bass, keyboards (2001–2005)
- Kenseth Thibideau – keyboards, bass, guitar (2003–2006)
- Cameron Jones – drums (2004–2005)
- Erik Hoversten – guitar, bass, keyboards (2006–2011)
- Terrin Durfey – keyboards, bass, guitar (2007–2008)
- Chris Fulford-Brown – keyboards, bass, guitar (2008)
- Braden Diotte – keyboards, bass, guitar (2008–2011)
