= 2 (The Black Heart Procession album) =

Studio album by The Black Heart Procession
- Released: May 18, 1999
- Recorded: November 1998 – January 1999
- Studio: Bear Creek Studio (Woodinville, Washington); Rafter Roberts' garage
- Genre: Indie rock
- Length: 51:13
- Label: Touch and Go
- Producer: Ryan Hadlock; The Black Heart Procession

The Black Heart Procession chronology
1 (1998)	2 (1999)	Three (2000)

Professional ratings
Review scores
Source	Rating
AllMusic	4.5/5 stars
Alternative Press	4/5
Melody Maker	3.5/5 stars
Pitchfork	7.9/10

2 is the second studio album by the American indie rock band The Black Heart Procession. It was released on May 18, 1999, by Touch and Go Records.

== Track listing ==
No.	Title	Length
1.	"The Waiter No. 2"	4:00
2.	"Blue Tears"	4:55
3.	"A Light So Dim"	7:53
4.	"Your Church Is Red"	4:13
5.	"When We Reach the Hill"	3:44
6.	"Outside the Glass"	2:41
7.	"Gently Off the Edge"	5:52
8.	"It's a Crime I Never Told You About the Diamonds in Your Eyes"	3:29
9.	"My Heart Might Stop"	3:51
10.	"Beneath the Ground"	3:14
11.	"The Waiter No. 3"	7:21
