= The Black Heart Procession =

American rock band

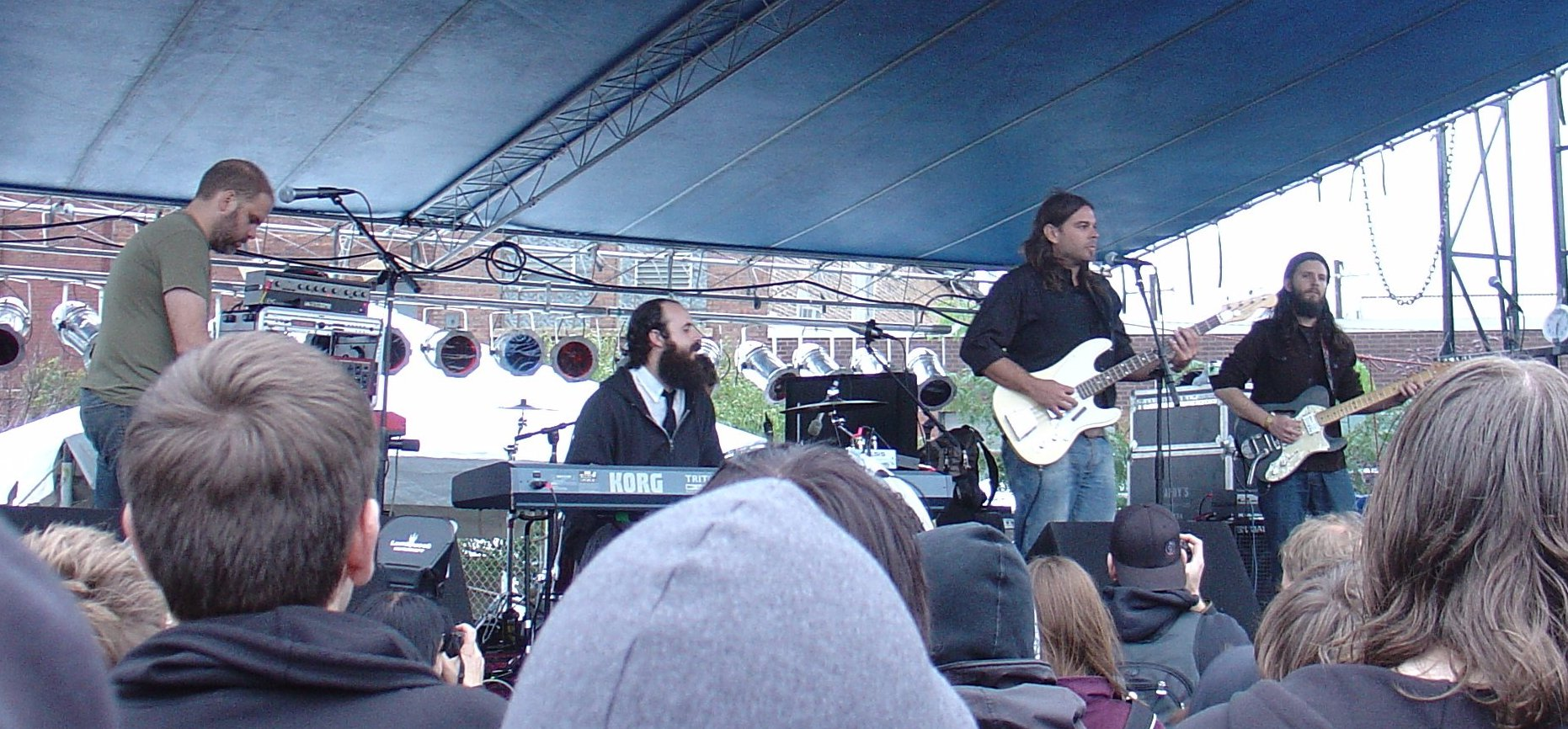
- The Black Heart Procession performing at Touch and Go Records 25th anniversary celebration at The Hideout in Chicago, September 2006

Background information
- Origin: San Diego, California, U.S.
- Genres: Indie rock
- Years active: 1997–2013; 2016–present
- Labels: Headhunter; Temporary Residence Ltd.; Touch and Go
- Members: Pall Jenkins; Tobias Nathaniel
- Website: theblackheartprocession.com

The Black Heart Procession (occasionally spelled The Blackheart Procession) is an American indie rock band from San Diego, California.

== History ==
=== Early years ===
The band was formed in 1997 by Pall Jenkins (Mr. Tube and the Flying Objects, Palllap, Ugly Casanova and Three Mile Pilot) and Tobias Nathaniel from Three Mile Pilot. The group is often augmented with the contributions of Matt Resovich, Mario Rubalcaba, Jason Crane, Joe Plummer, Dmitri Dziensuwski, Jimmy LaValle and Matthew Parker. Jenkins has also produced The Drowning Men.

=== Hiatus ===
After their last release, the Blood Bunny / Black Rabbit EP in 2010, the band went on hiatus. Jenkins told San Diego City Beat that after "years of touring and traveling and focusing on music, we decided just to kind of put an end to it for a while". In 2011, Jenkins played optigan, piano, and sang on J Mascis's album Several Shades of Why and returned to play guitar and sing on Mascis's 2014 album Tied to a Star.

=== Reformation ===
In 2016 Blackheart Procession reassembled for a pair of shows in San Diego. In December 2016, they announced tour with 27 shows all over Europe during March–April 2017.

In early 2025, the band played a set for KEXP-FM.

== Discography ==
Albums:

- 1, Headhunter Records (1998)
- 2, Touch and Go Records (1999)
- Three, Touch and Go Records (2000)
- Amore Del Tropico, Touch and Go Records (2002)
- The Spell, Touch and Go Records (2006)
- The Waiter Chapters 1 - 7, SDRL Records (2008)
- Six, Temporary Residence (2009)

Singles and EPs:

- A Three Song Recording, (1997)
- Fish the Holes on Frozen Lakes, (1999)
- Between The Machines, Suicide Squeeze Records (2001)
- In the Fishtank 11 (with Solbakken), (2004)
- Hearts and Tanks, (2005)
- Blood Bunny / Black Rabbit, Temporary Residence (2010)

Compilation appearances:

- Slaying since 1996, Suicide Squeeze Records (2006) – track After The Ladder
- Infamous 2: The Blue Soundtrack, Sumthing Else Music Works (2011) – track Fade Away
- Time & Space (Liz Janes covered), Asthmatic Kitty (2011) – track Martyr's Grind Up
