= Armistead Burwell Smith IV =

American musician

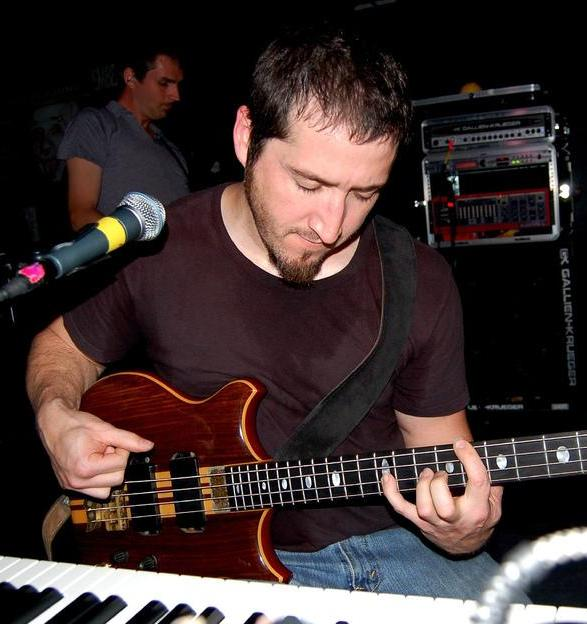
- Armistead in May, 2006

Background information
- Also known as: Zach Smith, ABSIV, ABS4
- Born: May 30, 1970 (age 55)
- Origin: Encinitas, California, U.S.
- Genres: Indie rock, art punk
- Instruments: Bass, piano, keyboard
- Years active: 1991–present
- Labels: Touch and Go, Ace Fu, Temporary Residence Limited
- Website: systemsofficer.bandcamp.com

Armistead Burwell Smith IV (also known as Zach Smith) is an American composer and musician. He has recorded with multiple bands, including most notably Pinback, as well on his own, under the name Systems Officer.

== Career ==
=== Early playing ===
Smith began playing bass in 1984 at the age of 14 after he and his high school (Torrey Pines High School, Del Mar, California) friends were looking to form a reggae band, which they named White Lion (seemingly unaware of the heavy metal band of the same name). Smith attributes his sound to "being bored" playing single-note basslines. Smith developed his sound by experimenting with different harmonies on the bass, a style that would later become his signature. Smith was largely self-taught and tried to do "different things with the bass"

=== Three Mile Pilot ===
Born in San Diego, California, his father Ted Smith was an architect and his mother Tambie Antell was a stained glass artist. Zach first came to attention as the bass guitarist for rock band Three Mile Pilot. Smith's distinctive playing style and complex fretwork technique defines the overall sound of the band. This was clear as early as their first record Nà Vuccà Dò Lupù, on which Smith's bass was the only harmony instrument. Rumored attempts to change Three Mile Pilot's sound during the band's short tenure with major label Geffen Records persuaded Smith to separate from the band (and the label) and form Pinback with Rob Crow. Three Mile Pilot reformed and released an album, The Inevitable Past is the Future Forgotten, in 2010.

=== Pinback ===
Pinback is a band formed and headed by Smith and Rob Crow in 1998. It is Smith's most commercially successful project to date. Smith and Crow played music together as early as their days as roommates, and had never released any music. The two began collaborating during his break from Three Mile Pilot. In addition to Zach's bass, Pinback songs often include layered instruments, drum machines, and vocals. The band's original recordings, that later became their first album, Pinback, were recorded on Smith's personal computer. To date, the band has recorded five studio albums, with the latest, Information Retrieved, released on October 16, 2012.

The name "Pinback" originated from the 1974 film, Dark Star. One of the crew members on a spaceship in the film was named Sgt. Pinback.

=== Systems Officer ===
Zach Smith also has a solo project called Systems Officer that allows him "to follow through completely his own ideas and concepts" and "to explore the workings of his inner mind and let his ingeniousness flourish". Smith's own sound shines in this project, something not entirely possible in his other bands. However, listeners will find this sound fairly similar to his work with Pinback. On May 11, 2004, Zach released a self-titled EP from this project on Ace Fu Records, playing all instruments himself (including drums).
In 2009, Smith released Underslept on the Temporary Residence Limited label, this time collaborating with Pinback and 3 Mile Pilot drummers Chris Prescott and Tom Zinser. A single with two B-sides, "Shape Shifter", was also released. It is his first full-length album as Systems Officer.

== Discography ==
=== Three Mile Pilot ===
- Nà Vuccà Dò Lupù (1992)
- Chief Assassin to the Sinister (Cargo/Headhunter 1994)
- Another Desert, Another Sea (1997)
- Three Mile Pilot (Gravity EP) (1998)
- Songs From an Old Town We Once Knew (1999, compilation)
- The Inevitable Past Is the Future Forgotten (Temporary Residence 2010)
- Maps (Three Mile Pilot EP) (2012)

=== Pinback ===
- This Is a Pinback CD (1999)
- Blue Screen Life (2001)
- Summer in Abaddon (2004) U.S. #196
- Nautical Antiques (2006, compilation)
- Autumn of the Seraphs (2007) U.S. #69
- Information Retrieved (2012)

=== Systems Officer ===
- Systems Officer EP (2004)
- Underslept (2009)
- "Shape Shifter" – Single (2009)
- In Our Code (2024)
- My Traps Your Mazes (2025)
