= Three Mile Pilot =

American rock band

- Origin: San Diego, California, U.S.
- Genres: Alternative rock; math rock; noise rock
- Years active: 1991–present
- Members: Armistead Burwell Smith IV; Pall Jenkins; Tom Zinser

Three Mile Pilot (often shortened to 3MP) is an American indie rock band from San Diego, California, formed by Armistead Burwell Smith IV (a.k.a. Zach Smith) from Pinback, Systems Officer, Neighborhood Watch on bass and vocals, Pall Jenkins (The Black Heart Procession, Dark Sarcasm, Mr. Tube) on vocals and guitar, and Tom Zinser (Neighborhood Watch (CV), Pinback) on drums.

== History ==
=== 1991–2000 ===
The group released their first album, Nà Vuccà Dò Lupù in 1991. It was recorded and mixed in three days, composed only of bass, vocals, and drums, and released on Cargo/Headhunter. Their next record, The Chief Assassin to the Sinister, came out (also on Cargo/Headhunter) in 1993, with a vinyl version released by Negative Records and then later by Goldenrod Records. It was significantly darker and introduced Jenkins on guitar. Geffen Records took an interest in the band, re-issued Chief with three new tracks produced by Tchad Blake, backed three months of touring and set them up at Seattle's Bear Creek Studios to produce a new album with Steve Fisk. Because of internal strife over the belabored new album Another Desert, Another Sea, Geffen dropped 3MP, allowing them to keep their masters which were later released by Headhunter. They added Tobias Nathaniel (The Black Heart Procession, The Young Destroyers, A Day Called Zero, Struggle) on piano/keyboard and released Another Desert, Another Sea in 1997. Several seven inch releases followed on various labels, as well as a self-titled EP released on Gravity Records the following year. Songs from the seven inch releases and other unreleased tracks were gathered in a two-CD compilation titled Songs From an Old Town We Once Knew, released on Cargo/Headhunter in 1999.

3MP's early releases often referenced the cult sci-fi computer game series Star Control, as evidenced by album and song titles such as Star Control Out, "Chenjesu", "The Ur-Quan Destroyer", "Androsynth Guardian", and "Ilwrath", simply because they liked the names.

=== Reunion ===
After years on the backburner writing material intermittently, Three Mile Pilot partnered with indie label Touch and Go Records working toward a new album and played the über-weekend extravaganza Touch and Go 25th anniversary festival in Chicago in 2006. Following the downsizing of Touch and Go the band moved on and is now partnered with Temporary Residence Limited. Pinback and Blackheart have also both moved from Touch and Go Records to Temporary Residence Limited.

Three Mile Pilot played three sold-out shows at Tim Mays' The Casbah on January 18, 19 and 20, 2009 as part of the venue's 20th anniversary celebration. The line-up included Pall Jenkins, Armistead Burwell Smith IV, and Tom Zinser, as well as Kenseth Thibideau (Sleeping People) on keyboards, and Brad Lee (Mr. Tube, Comfortable for You) on bass and guitar.

The band toured the west coast in July 2009, their first tour in over ten years, and re-released their earlier work as a handmade six CD box set titled Three Mile Pilot: 1991–1999. They announced that a new album was nearly finished and that in October 2009, a seven inch with two new songs ("Planets/Grey Clouds") would be available. Their latest album entitled The Inevitable Past is the Future Forgotten was released on September 28, 2010, to much critical acclaim. This was their first album in over a decade.

== Discography ==
Studio albums

- Nà Vuccà Dò Lupù (1992)
- The Chief Assassin to the Sinister (1994)
- Another Desert, Another Sea (1997)
- The Inevitable Past Is the Future Forgotten (2010)

EPs

- Three Mile Pilot (1998)
- Maps (2012)

Compilations

- Songs From an Old Town We Once Knew (2000)

Singles

- "Circumcised" (1993)
- "This Divine Crown" (1997)
- "Piano Plus/Piano Minus" (1997)
- "Red Sensing" (1997)
- "The Approach" (1997, Split w/ A Minor Forest)
- "Late Night in the City of Jodoolestan" (1997)
- "In This Town I Awaken" (1998, Split w/ Boilermaker)
- "The House Is Loss" (1998)
- "Planets/Grey Clouds" (2009)
