= Karate (band) =

American indie rock band

- Origin: Boston, Massachusetts, U.S.
- Genres: indie rock; Slowcore; post-rock; jazz fusion; blues rock; emo; post-hardcore
- Works: Karate discography
- Years active: 1993–2005; 2022–present
- Labels: Southern; The Numero Group
- Members: Geoff Farina; Gavin McCarthy; Jeff Goddard
- Past members: Eamonn Vitt
- Website: karateallston.bandcamp.com

Karate is an American band, formed in Boston, Massachusetts in 1993 by Geoff Farina, Eamonn Vitt and Gavin McCarthy, with Jeff Goddard joining in 1995. The band split up in 2005 before reuniting in 2022.

The band is characterized by fusion of indie rock, emo, post-hardcore, post-rock and jazz, with the jazz influence becoming more dominant in later releases.

== History ==
In 1993, Karate was formed by Geoff Farina (vocals, guitar), Eamonn Vitt (bass) and Gavin McCarthy (drums). In 1995, Jeff Goddard joined the band as bass player, and Vitt moved to second guitar.

Vitt left Karate to pursue a medical career in 1997. According to Farina, after Vitt's departure, the band's sound changed drastically. Though they initially saw themselves as "indie band, [or] a post-punk band or something," Farina, McCarthy, and Goddard began drawing on their jazz training, and the band's sound drifted away from its indie rock origins. Around the time of 2000's Unsolved and 2002's Some Boots, Farina would adopt such influences as Elmore James, Sonny Sharrock, and Nels Cline, which the band would then "punk-ify."

Their music during their original run was primarily released on Southern Records.

=== Breakup and post-breakup projects ===
Farina developed hearing problems due to twelve years of performance with Karate and was forced to disband the group in July 2005. Disbanding with fanfare, the group had recorded six studio albums and had almost seven hundred performances in twenty countries. Their final show was played in Rome, Italy, on July 10, 2005.

In 2007, the former band members released the live album 595. It is a recording of the band's 595th performance, on May 5, 2003 at Stuk, Leuven, Belgium. The recording was sent to them by a sound technician, and Karate were so astonished by the quality they decided to release it as an official live album. Karate's perfectionism and attention to detail is well known among the music scene, which played a part in the naming of the album. It was originally to be called 594. However, McCarthy discovered a flyer for a forgotten early show, so the band quickly changed the title to 595.

Goddard played in the band Jones Very along with Vic Bondi and Jamie Van Bramer. In 2005, Goddard played bass on the Chris Brokaw album Incredible Love.

Farina developed a solo career, releasing three albums and a number of EPs. He also worked with Chris Brokaw, releasing work as Geoff Farina & Chris Brokaw.

McCarthy has been part of a number of bands including E, which released albums in 2016 and 2018.

=== Reissues and reunion ===
According to Farina, the band's former label Southern Records had refused to reissue their albums or allow the band access to their master tapes. Karate and the label eventually came to an agreement, and Southern returned the band's masters. In 2021, The Numero Group announced they would be reissuing Karate's music after long periods of their music being unavailable. The first releases to be reissued were the band's first two albums.

In 2022, Stereogum reported that the band would reunite for their first tour in 17 years. It was announced in November that the band would play Primavera Sound festival in 2023.

On September 15, 2023, the Numero Group released Complete Studio Recordings, compiling their six studio albums, the Cancel/Sing and In The Fish Tank EPs, singles, and split 7"s. The 69 tracks were split across eight CDs. The box set included an 80-page book by Leor Galil containing essays and photographs.

On January 7, 2024, Numero Group posted on Twitter teasing new music for the band, featuring a short video of the members at the end of what they said was the "first Karate session in 20 years". Numero would later mention that a "new Karate record [is] currently in the works". The album was formally announced with the name Make It Fit with a release date of October 18, along with the Defendants b/w Silence, Sound single released on July 25.

== Influences ==
The band has said in interviews that their combination of indie rock and jazz came from studying music theory in college. Farina's guitar playing was influenced by such acts as the Minutemen, Beefeater, and McCoy Tyner.

== Discography ==
- Karate (1996, Southern Records)
- In Place of Real Insight (1997, Southern)
- The Bed is in the Ocean (1998, Southern)
- Unsolved (October 2000/March 2001, Southern)
- Some Boots (October 2002, Southern)
- Pockets (August 2004, Southern)
- Make It Fit (2024, Numero Group)
