= Amore del Tropico =

Studio album by The Black Heart Procession
- Released: October 8, 2002
- Genre: Indie rock
- Length: 55:34
- Label: Touch & Go

The Black Heart Procession chronology
Three (2000)	Amore del Tropico (2002)	In the Fishtank 11 (2004)

Professional ratings
Aggregate scores
Source	Rating
Metacritic	75/100
Review scores
Source	Rating
AllMusic	4.5/5 stars
Pitchfork Media	(7.9/10)

Amore del Tropico is the fourth studio album by the American indie rock band The Black Heart Procession. It was released on October 8, 2002, on Touch and Go Records.

== Track listing ==
1. "The End of Love" - 0:12
2. "Tropics of Love" - 4:56
3. "Broken World" - 4:33
4. "Why I Stay" - 3:30
5. "The Invitation" - 3:55
6. "Did You Wonder" - 2:54
7. "A Sign on the Road" - 3:49
8. "Sympathy Crime" - 4:24
9. "The Visitor" - 5:03
10. "The Waiter #4" - 3:32
11. "A Cry for Love" - 6:12
12. "Before the People" - 2:53
13. "Only One Way" - 3:11
14. "Fingerprints" - 2:57
15. "The One Who Has Disappeared" - 3:33
