= Pall Jenkins =

American singer-songwriter

- Genres: Indie rock
- Occupation: Musician
- Instruments: Vocals, guitar
- Years active: 1991–present

Pall Jenkins is an American vocalist, guitarist and music producer. He is the front man for the bands Three Mile Pilot and The Black Heart Procession, as well as his collaborations with Vampire Rodents and Ugly Casanova.

== Biography ==
Pall Jenkins formed Three Mile Pilot with bassist Zach Smith and drummer Thomas Zinser in 1991. The band released three albums before parting ways so they could focus on individual projects. Jenkins then formed The Black Heart Procession in 1997 with Tobias Nathaniel, who had previously collaborated with him on Three Mile Pilot. The duo released six albums over the span of eleven years and achieved a degree of critical acclaim and recognition for their work. In 2006, Jenkins formed Mr. Tube and the Flying Objects with bass player and trumpeter Brad Lee. In 2010, a reunited Three Mile Pilot released The Inevitable Past Is the Future Forgotten, an album that was five years in the making.
