= Scala & Kolacny Brothers =

Belgian women's choir

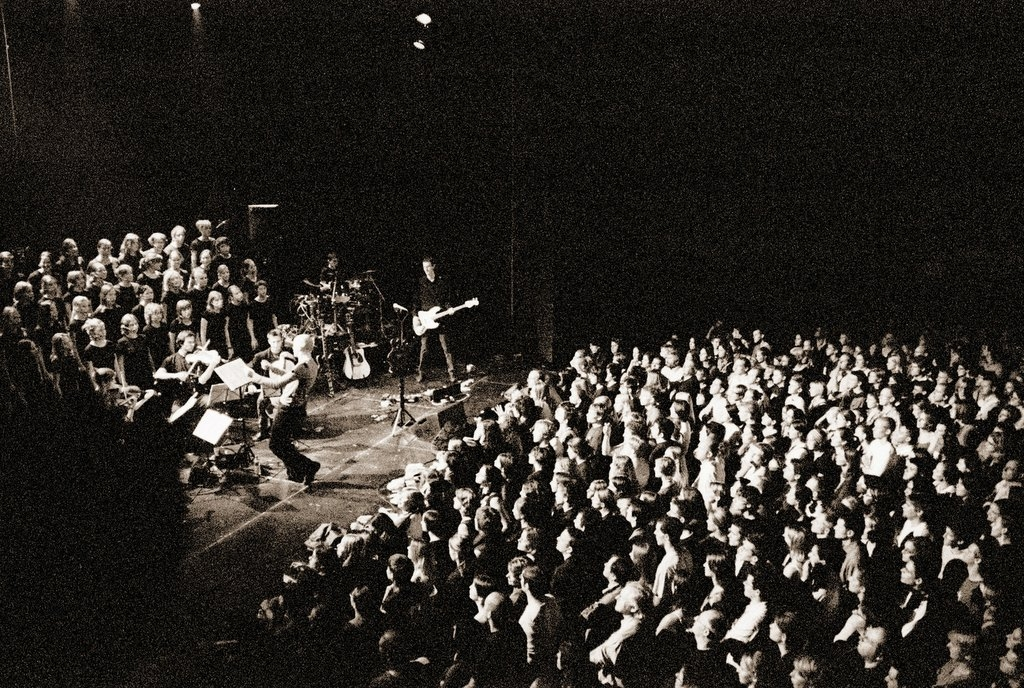
- Scala & Kolacny Brothers in 2006

Background information
- Origin: Aarschot, Belgium
- Genre: Choral
- Years active: 1996–present
- Labels: ATCO; Warner; PIAS
- Members: Stijn Kolacny; Steven Kolacny; Women's choir
- Website: scalachoir.com

Scala & Kolacny Brothers is a Belgian women's choir conducted by Stijn Kolacny, and arranged and accompanied by Steven Kolacny on the piano. They have released five studio albums (in multiple languages), starting with On the Rocks in, 2002. Most of their songs are specially arranged renditions of songs by well-known musicians and bands, such as Oasis, Björk, Radiohead, U2, Nirvana, Depeche Mode, Muse, and Rammstein, although they have also recorded their own compositions.

== History ==
=== Early years ===
Formed in 1996, Scala & Kolacny Brothers won the Belgian Choir of the Year contest in 2000. In 2006, Rammstein released their live album Völkerball which features Scala & Kolacny Brothers' "Engel" in the closing credits of the DVD. In 2008, the group was asked to do a project in remembrance of Belgian singer Pierre Rapsat, who died in 2002. The sold out Dans les yeux d’Aurore tour strengthened the group's relationship with Belgium's French-speaking audience. The number of concerts in Germany also increased steadily, and they performed more and more songs in German, including their version of the MIA. hit, "Hungriges Herz". A top national German television commercial used this version.

=== International breakthrough ===
Scala & Kolacny Brothers' album Circle was released through VIVA/NOVA in Belgium in June 2010. Also in 2010, they signed with ATCO Records (Warner Music Group) for North American distribution and re-signed with independent label PIAS for Europe. ATCO digitally released a limited edition EP DAWN on 26 October 2010. A special German edition of Circle was released as a double CD on 26 November 2010 in Germany.

In July 2010, a trailer for the film The Social Network featuring Scala & Kolacny Brothers' cover of Radiohead's "Creep" was released around the world. This trailer was seen over 250 million times in cinemas and on TV, as well as over 10 million times in various forms on YouTube. The group's version of The Police's "Every Breath You Take" was featured in the trailer for ITV1's period drama Downton Abbey in the fall of 2010. The song was again used on television in New Zealand, Spain and Belgium, as well as in many other countries upon the release of Downton Abbey around the world. The group's version of U2's "With or Without You" was used in Downton Abbey's season two trailer in the fall of 2011. Both the single and album hit #1 in Ireland. In December 2011, the trailer for Downton Abbey season two hit the United States on PBS. In the UK, ITV used the group's version of Wham!'s "Last Christmas" for the Downton Abbey Christmas special in December 2011. Scala & Kolacny Brothers performed at the VIP premiere of the Christmas special at the Corinthia Hotel in London and became fast friends with the show's cast. The show would again use a cover by the group, Lou Reed's "Perfect Day", for their season 3 trailer in fall of 2012.

Scala & Kolacny Brothers' music video for their version of the Kings of Leon track "Use Somebody" had its world premiere on Yahoo Music on 14 March 2011. The video was directed by Inti Calfat. A subsequent video for the Foo Fighters' "Everlong" was directed by Mark Woollen, who was also responsible for the trailer for The Social Network. On 18 April 2011, Scala appeared as a musical guest on the TBS show Conan.

The self-titled Scala & Kolacny Brothers CD was released by ATCO in the United States on 15 March 2011. This CD is somewhat different from the European Circle release. The group performed their first US concert as part of the South by Southwest Music Festival on 18 March 2011, at the legendary Stubb's BBQ restaurant. A North American tour started in Vancouver on 7 April, hitting most major markets in the US including Los Angeles, Chicago, and New York City, as well as the Coachella Valley Music and Arts Festival before concluding 2 May in Montreal. On 8 June, they performed for the first time in the UK - a sold out show at the legendary Union Chapel in London. On 18–19 June, they performed at the Heineken Dia de La Musica in Madrid. On 17 July, they were the special guest at the Latitude Festival in the UK, playing for about 20.000 fans. On 13 December, they played what is now called the "Ice Show" (the heating in the venue did not work, and stage and venue temperatures were below 8 degrees celsius) at the HMV Forum in London, followed by a real ice show in Ingolstadt, Germany.

The album Scala & Kolacny Brothers was released by PIAS in the UK, Spain, and France on 6 June 2011. A special version of the album, with two Italian language tracks, was released in November 2011 in Italy by independent label Carosello and hit the top 10 in Italy during December. The German version of the television special "Live From Bruges" aired on SIXX (Germany) on 17 August 2011, after prior airings in Flemish and French in Belgium. The US version began airing on PBS in November 2011, with a launch on WGBH-TV in Boston. PIAS UK re-released the Scala & Kolacny Brothers album with two additional covers of Coldplay tracks ("Yellow" and "Viva La Vida") on 12 December 2011. The group appeared on the Royal Variety Show (ITV) and the Sports Personality of the Year show (BBC One) in that month.

In late 2011, a special collaboration with German hip hop star Kool Savas resulted in a special video. From 23 September to 31 October 2011, the group's version of Marilyn Manson's "The Beautiful People (song)" was used as the background music for the 7 Scarezone in Halloween Horror Nights 21 at Universal Orlando. Ironically, the original version by Manson was also used in the scarezone. The group's version of "Creep" was also used in The Simpsons episodes "The Ten-Per-Cent Solution", which aired on 4 December 2011, and "The D'oh-cial Network", which aired on 15 January 2012. The song was also used in the French movie Poisson Violent, the German movie Wir Sind Die Nacht, and in the UK soap opera Hollyoaks. Hollyoaks also used the group's version of "With or Without You" in December 2011. Other major Scala & Kolacny Brothers appearances in America include The CW TV series Nikita and one of Steven Kolacny's own songs, "Our Last Fight", in season three of the FX drama series Sons of Anarchy.

=== Recent years ===
In February 2012, Scala & Kolacny Brothers performed with Francesco Renga at the Sanremo Music Festival. Their single "Engel" was featured in the trailer for the horror movie, The Possession, starring Kyra Sedgwick and Jeffrey Dean Morgan. The group sang the "Greek National Anthem" at the 2012 Summer Olympics closing ceremony on 12 August 2012. Also In 2012, their version of Damien Rice's "Blower's Daughter" was featured in the final scene of the season 3 episode 8 "Glass Spider" of the USA Network show Covert Affairs.

In January 2013, the group's version of Metallica's "Nothing Else Matters" was featured in the television trailer for the film Zero Dark Thirty. In February 2013, their version of "The Beautiful People (song)" was used in both the extended and short TV spots for the film Beautiful Creatures. In March 2013, their version of The Mamas & the Papas "California Dreamin'" was featured prominently in a commercial for the California State Lottery Powerball.

In March 2014, their version of "Nothing Else Matters" was played at the end of the pilot episode of NBC's new drama Crisis. The same song was used in a promo for NBC's Heroes Reborn. Also in 2014, their version of "Creep" was featured at the end of the documentary Kids for Cash.

In 2015, the group was asked to make a custom music track for the trailers of the long-awaited new video game Evolve. They recorded a cover (arranged specially for the trailer) of "Ready Or Not" by The Fugees.

In 2016, their version of "Creep" was used in a Criminal Minds episode. Gotham also featured their version of "Górecki" in Season 2. A television advertisement in the U.S. for PlayStation 4 featured their cover of The Eurythmics' "Sweet Dreams (Are Made of This)."

In 2020, their version of "I Touch Myself" accompanied the opening scene of Sex Education season two.

Also in 2020, their version of R.E.M's "The One I Love" was used in the final scene of the season 3 episode "Unsaid" of The Good Doctor, as well as in the series finale "The Last War" (Season 7, episode 16) of CW's The 100.

In 2021, their version of "Perfect Day" by Lou Reed was used in a first teaser trailer for an upcoming movie Spencer by Pablo Larrain, with Kristen Stewart as a lead.

In 2021, their version of "Champagne Supernova" by Oasis was used in the finale episode of Lucifer.

In 2024, their version of "Everything in Its Right Place" by Radiohead was used in the trailer of the Netflix series 3 Body Problem.

In 2026, their version of "California Dreamin'" by The Mamas & The Papa's was used in season 1, episode 3 (Daisy) in the Hulu series The Testaments.

In 2026, their version of "Ready or Not" by The Fugees was used in season 5, episode 10 of NBC's The Traitors: New Blood.

== Discography ==
=== Albums ===
- 2002 – On the Rocks (Belgian version)
- 2004 – Dream On
- 2004 – Respire
- 2005 – On the Rocks (International version)
- 2005 – Grenzenlos
- 2006 – It All Leads to This
- 2007 – One-Winged Angel
- 2008 – Paper Plane
- 2008 – Dans les yeux d'Aurore
- 2010 – Circle
- 2011 – Scala & Kolacny Brothers
- 2011 – Scala & Kolacny Brothers (Re-released in the UK and Ireland)
- 2012 – December
- 2013 – Black Moon
- 2015 – Unendlich
- 2016 – Solstice
- 2022 – Gloaming
- 2023 – Dusk
- 2024 – BESIDES

=== Singles ===
- 2004 – "Engel"
- 2004 – "Schrei nach Liebe"
- 2005 – "With or Without You" / "Clandestino"
- 2005 – "Hungriges Herz"
- 2005 – "Last Christmas"
- 2007 – "Friday I'm in Love" / "Somebody"
- 2008 – "Raintears"

=== Extended discography ===
==== On the Rocks (Belgian version) ====
1. "I Think I'm Paranoid" - Garbage
2. "Smells Like Teen Spirit" - Nirvana
3. "Can't Get You Out of My Head" - Kylie Minogue
4. "Ik Hou Van U" - Noordkaap
5. "Satelliet S.U.Z.Y." - Noordkaap
6. "Van God Los" - Monza
7. "God In My Bed" - K's Choice
8. "She Hates Me" - Puddle of Mudd
9. "Let Her Down Easy" - Terence Trent D'Arby feat. Jasper Steverlinck
10. "All I Did (Was Get Close to You)" - Arid feat. Jasper Steverlinck
11. "Teenage Dirtbag" - Wheatus
12. "Someone New" - Eskobar/Heather Nova
13. "Creep" - Radiohead (live)
14. "Muscle Museum" - Muse
15. "Every Breath You Take" - The Police

==== On the Rocks (International version) ====
1. "I Think I'm Paranoid" - Garbage
2. "Smells Like Teen Spirit" - Nirvana
3. "Can't Get You Out of My Head" - Kylie Minogue
4. "Turn" - Travis
5. "Somebody" - Depeche Mode
6. "She Hates Me" - Puddle of Mudd
7. "Let Her Down Easy" - Terence Trent D'Arby feat. Jasper Steverlinck
8. "Life on Mars" - David Bowie feat. Jasper Steverlinck
9. "Teenage Dirtbag" - Wheatus
10. "Someone New" - Eskobar/Heather Nova
11. "Creep" - Radiohead (live)
12. "Muscle Museum" - Muse
13. "Every Breath You Take" - The Police

===== Charts =====
Chart (2002)	Peak position
Belgian Albums Chart (Flanders)	5
Belgian Albums Chart (Wallonia)	49
French Albums Chart	53

==== Dream On ====
1. "Dream On" - Depeche Mode
2. "Under the Bridge" - Red Hot Chili Peppers
3. "Don't Break My Heart" - UB40
4. "21 Things I Want In a Lover" - Alanis Morissette
5. "Wrong" - The New Symbol
6. "I Touch Myself" - Divinyls
7. "Go Where I Send Thee" - Stephen Hatfield
8. "Exit Music (For a Film)" - Radiohead
9. "Bitter Sweet Symphony" - The Verve
10. "With or Without You" - U2
11. "Walking After You" - Foo Fighters
12. "Daddy I'm Fine" - Sinéad O'Connor
13. "Perfect Day" - Lou Reed
14. "Underneath It All" - Nine Inch Nails

===== Bonus tracks =====
1. "Engel" - Rammstein
2. "Kein Zurück" - Wolfsheim
3. "Somebody" - Depeche Mode
4. "Creep" (live) - Radiohead
5. "Smells Like Teen Spirit" (live) - Nirvana
6. "Someone New" (music video) - Eskobar/Heather Nova
7. "With or Without You" (music video) - U2 (live)

===== Charts =====
Chart (2003)	Peak position
Belgian Albums Chart (Flanders)	19
Belgian Albums Chart (Wallonia)	14
French Albums Chart	132
German Albums Chart	42

==== Respire ====
1. "Electrastar" - Indochine
2. "Clandestino" - Manu Chao
3. "Marilou Sous La Neige" - Serge Gainsbourg
4. "Le Vent Nous Portera" - Noir Désir
5. "Jeune Et Con" - Damien Saez
6. "Respire" - Mickey 3D
7. "J'en Rêve Encore" - Gérald De Palmas
8. "Sexy Boy" - Air
9. "Un Monde Parfait" - Les Innocents
10. "Je N'Veux Pas Rester Sage" - Dolly
11. "Le Jour S'est Levé" - Téléphone
12. "Remède" - Mass Hysteria
13. "Face À La Mer" - Les Négresses Vertes

===== Bonus tracks =====
1. "Evigheden" - Michael Bojesen
2. "Mon Bonhomme" - Steven Kolacny
3. "Engel" - Rammstein
4. "With or Without You" (music video) - U2

===== Charts =====
Chart (2004)	Peak position
Belgian Albums Chart (Flanders)	50
Belgian Albums Chart (Wallonia)	44
French Albums Chart	36

==== Grenzenlos ====
1. "Hungriges Herz" - MIA.
2. "Du Trägst Keine Liebe In Dir" - Echt
3. "Mensch" - Herbert Grönemeyer
4. "Ein Kompliment" - Sportfreunde Stiller
5. "Mutter" - Rammstein
6. "Perfekte Welle" - Juli
7. "Ohne Dich" - Selig
8. "Hier kommt Alex" - Die Toten Hosen
9. "Denkmal" - Wir sind Helden
10. "Tausend Tränen Tief" - Blumfeld
11. "Das Model" - Kraftwerk
12. "Junimond" - Rio Reiser

===== Charts =====
Chart (2005)	Peak position
German Albums Chart	42

==== It All Leads to This ====
1. "Górecki" - Lamb
2. "Everyday I Love You Less and Less" - Kaiser Chiefs
3. "Station Approach" - Elbow
4. "Wake Up Dead Man" - U2
5. "Yellow" - Coldplay
6. "Enjoy the Silence" - Depeche Mode
7. "The Model" - Kraftwerk
8. "Heartbeats" - The Knife
9. "You Oughta Know" - Alanis Morissette
10. "New Favorite" - Alison Krauss & Union Station
11. "The Downtown Lights" - The Blue Nile
12. "Self-fulfilling Prophecy" - Steven Kolacny
13. "Everything in Its Right Place" - Radiohead

===== Bonus tracks =====
1. "Górecki" - Lamb (Radio Edit)
2. "Górecki" - Lamb (remix by Koen Buyse)

===== Charts =====
Chart (2006)	Peak position
Belgian Albums Chart (Flanders)	14
Belgian Albums Chart (Wallonia)	29

==== One-Winged Angel ====
1. "Jóga" - Björk (4:30)
2. "Black Horse and the Cherry Tree" - KT Tunstall (3:49)
3. "The Bitter End" - Placebo (2:21)
4. "The Blower's Daughter" - Damien Rice (4:35)
5. "I Believe in You" - Kylie Minogue (3:10)
6. "Fake Plastic Trees" - Radiohead (4:40)
7. "One-Winged-Angel" - Steven Kolacny (2:42)
8. "Somebody" - Depeche Mode (4:33)
9. "It's All Over" - Steven Kolacny / Jo Dawson (4:32)
10. "Friday I'm in Love" - The Cure (2:26)
11. "Colorblind" - Counting Crows (3:26)
12. "If You Could Read My Mind" - Gordon Lightfoot (5:10)
13. "The Beautiful People" - Marilyn Manson (3:54)
14. "Our Last Fight" - Steven Kolacny / Jo Dawson (4:10)

===== Charts =====
Chart (2007)	Peak position
Belgian Albums Chart (Flanders)	49
Belgian Albums Chart (Wallonia)	86

==== Paper Plane ====
1. "It Never Will Come Back" - Steven Kolacny
2. "Splinter" - Steven Kolacny / Jo Dawson
3. "Seashell" - Steven Kolacny / Jo Dawson
4. "I Will Bleed For You" - Steven Kolacny / Jo Dawson
5. "Raintears" - Steven Kolacny / Jo Dawson
6. "Woorden" - Steven Kolacny
7. "Paper Plane" - Steven Kolacny
8. "A Little More Each Time" - Steven Kolacny
9. "Kleine Man" - Steven Kolacny
10. "Magic" - Steven Kolacny

===== Charts =====
Chart (2008)	Peak position
Belgian Albums Chart (Flanders)	28

==== Scala & Kolacny Brothers (debut UK album) ====
1. "Nothing Else Matters" - Metallica
2. "Solsbury Hill" - Peter Gabriel
3. "Champagne Supernova" - Oasis
4. "Ironic" - Alanis Morissette
5. "With or Without You" (string version) - U2
6. "Everlong" - Foo Fighters
7. "I Feel You" - Depeche Mode
8. "Use Somebody" - Kings of Leon
9. "Our Last Fight" - Steven Kolacny / Jo Dawson
10. "Seashell" - Steven Kolacny / Jo Dawson
11. "Masquerade" - Steven Kolacny
12. "Creep" - Radiohead
13. "Smells Like Teen Spirit" - Nirvana

===== Charts =====
Chart (2011)	Peak position
Irish Albums Chart	10
Italian Albums Chart	27
UK Albums Chart	82

==== December (2012) ====
1. "My December" - Linkin Park
2. "Christmastime" - Smashing Pumpkins
3. "Christmas Lights" - Coldplay
4. "River" - Joni Mitchell
5. "Christmas Must Be Tonight" - The Band
6. "Let Me Sleep (It's Christmas Time)" - Pearl Jam
7. "2000 Miles" - The Pretenders
8. "It's Christmas! Let's Be Glad" - Sufjan Stevens
9. "Tears Can Sparkle Too" - Kolacny / Jo Dawson
10. "Sun-kissed Snow" - Kolacny / Jo Dawson
11. "Wintersong" - Sarah McLachlan
12. "When Doves Cry" - Prince
13. "Did I Make The Most Of Loving You" - John Lunn / Don Black
14. "Eskimo" - Damien Rice

==== Black Moon (2013) ====
1. "White Moon" - Koen Buyse / Steven Kolacny
2. "Futility" - Jo Dawson / Steven Kolacny
3. "Love in Primary Colours" - Koen Buyse / Jo Dawson / Steven Kolacny
4. "Butterflies" - Jo Dawson / Steven Kolacny
5. "Black Moon" - Koen Buyse / Steven Kolacny
6. "Little Angel" - Jo Dawson / Steven Kolacny
7. "Masquerade (Of Fools)" - Steven Kolacny / Vincent Neyt
8. "Crystalline Skies" - Koen Buyse / Steven Kolacny / Jo Dawson
9. "Sights and Sounds" - Steven Kolacny / Vincent Neyt
10. "Red Moon" - Koen Buyse / Steven Kolacny

==== Unendlich (2015) ====
1. "Liebe Ist Meine Rebellion" - Filippo Andrea Carmeni*, Gala Rizzatto, Maurizio Molella*
2. "Applaus Applaus" - Florian Weber
3. "Bei Meiner Seele" - Xavier Naidoo
4. "Schönste Zeit" - Axel Bosse
5. "Wie Soll Ein Mensch Das Ertragen" - Philipp Dominik Poisel
6. "Tage Wie Diese" - Andreas Frege, Birgit E. F. Minichmayr*
7. "Für Mich Soll's Rote Rosen Regnen " - Hildegard Knef
8. "Auf Uns" - Andreas Bourani, Julius Hartog, Thomas Olbrich*
9. "Landungsbrücken Raus" - Marcus Wiebusch
10. "Stark" - Sebastian Kirchner
11. "Cello" - Udo Lindenberg
12. "Berlin" - Annette Humpe
13. "Universal Tellerwäscher" - Christoph Leich, Frank Spilker, Frank Will, Julius Block

Bonus

1. "Ready Or Not" - Eith Ni Bhraonain*, Nicky Ryan, Roma Shane Ryan*, Thomas Randolph Bell*, William Alexander Hart*

==== Solstice (2016) ====
1. "Boys Don't Cry" - The Cure
2. "Sweet Dreams" - Eurythmics
3. "All of Me" - John Legend
4. "Crash Into Me" - Dave Matthews Band
5. "Cloudbusting" - Kate Bush
6. "Fat Bottomed Girls" - Queen
7. "Heroes" - David Bowie
8. "Hungry Heart" - Bruce Springsteen
9. "Survival" - Muse
10. "Dirty Diana" - Michael Jackson
11. "The One I Love" - R.E.M
12. "Piggy" - Nine Inch Nails
13. "Strong Enough" - Sheryl Crow
14. "Wake Me Up When September Ends" - Green Day
15. "Womanizer" - Britney Spears
16. "Follow You, Follow Me" - Genesis
17. "In The Air Tonight" - Phil Collins
18. "Barbie Girl" - Aqua
19. "I Don't Like Mondays" - The Boomtown Rats
20. "Black Hole Sun" - Soundgarden

==== Gloaming (2022) ====
1. "Survivor" - Destiny's Child
2. "Legends" - Juice Wrld
3. "The Book of Love" - The Magnetic Fields (adaptation of a cover by Peter Gabriel)
4. "All I Want Is You" - U2
5. "Can't Get It Out of My Head" - Electric Light Orchestra
6. "True Colors" - Cyndi Lauper
7. "Sad!" - XXXTentacion
8. "The Best" - Tina Turner
9. "Fragile" - Sting
10. "Save That Shit" - Lil Peep
11. "Under Pressure" - Queen feat David Bowie
12. "Iron Man" - Black Sabbath
13. "All I Need" - Radiohead
14. "Hurt So Bad" - Linda Rondstadt
15. "I Want You" - Bob Dylan
16. "Reptile" - Nine Inch Nails
17. "Tender" - Blur
18. "Video Games" - Lana Del Rey
19. "You're So Vain" - Carly Simon
20. "Cry Little Sister" - Gerard McMahon

==== Dusk (2023) ====
Dusk uniquely features Spanish-language versions of four previously recorded covers by Scala & Kolacny Brothers.

1. "You Give Love a Bad Name" - Bon Jovi
2. "In the End" - Linkin Park
3. "My Hero" - Foo Fighters
4. "Toxic" - Britney Spears
5. "Hurt" - Nine Inch Nails
6. "Here Comes the Sun" - The Beatles
7. "I Can't Make You Love Me - Bonnie Raitt
8. "I've Gotta Be Me" - Sammy Davis Jr.
9. "The One That You Love" - Air Supply
10. "Hard to Say I'm Sorry" - Chicago
11. "The Circle Game" - Joni Mitchell
12. "A Groovy Kind of Love" - Phil Collins
13. "Wicked Game" - Chris Isaak
14. "Here, There and Everywhere" - The Beatles
15. "Please Don't Go" - KC and the Sunshine Band
16. "What Do You Want from Me" - Pink Floyd
17. "California Mia" (California Dreamin') - The Mamas & the Papas
18. "Raro" (Creep) - Radiohead
19. "Siempre Te Amaré" (Every Breath You Take) - The Police
20. "No Importa Nada Más" (Nothing Else Matters) - Metallica

== Performances (selection) ==
- Festspiele Balver Höhle
