= Someone New =

Someone New may refer to:

- Someone New (album) (2021)
- "Someone New" (Eskobar song) (2002)
- "Someone New" (Hozier song) (2015)
- "Someone New", a 2014 song by Banks from Goddess
- "Someone New", a 2023 song by Freya Ridings from Blood Orange
