= Pearl (Heather Nova album) =

Studio album by Heather Nova
- Released: June 28, 2019
- Studio: Spain
- Label: Saltwater
- Producer: Youth

Heather Nova chronology
The Way It Feels (2015)	Pearl (2019)	Other Shores (2022)

Professional ratings
Review scores
Source	Rating
AllMusic	3.5/5 stars
The Spill Magazine	8/10 stars

Pearl is the tenth studio album by the Bermudan singer-songwriter, Heather Nova. The album was released on June 28, 2019.

== Background ==
As it is 25 years since the release of Oyster, Nova's second album from 1994, the themes of Pearl mirror those on Oyster. Reviewers have noted the rockier feel to the album Pearl in comparison to some of Nova's previous albums in the 21st century.

Nova worked with the music producer Youth on the album at his own studio in Spain. Youth was also the producer on Oyster and was enthused about this follow up album. Nova stated that there is a correlation between both Oyster and Pearl, saying

A pearl is hopefully what forms inside an Oyster after all the years.

Further links with Oyster include the song "Over the Fields". Nova states

Last year [2018] the man I wrote "Island" about (who had abused me) was dying. When I heard that, I reached out to him for the first time in almost 30 years, to say that I forgave him. He wrote me an incredible letter of regret and apology for all the pain and suffering he had caused me. I felt there was a kind of closure. After he died, I wrote "Over the Fields"; It's a song of forgiveness and compassion for a troubled soul that never managed to find its way clear in this life; A hope for a second chance the next time round.

The album was preceded in some European countries by the single "Just Kids", on May 31, 2019, but in other countries, the first single released was "The Wounds We Bled".

== Track listing ==
All tracks are written by Heather Nova.

No.	Title	Length
1.	"The Wounds We Bled"	3:50
2.	"All the Rivers"	4:00
3.	"Rewild Me"	4:13
4.	"Some Things Just Come Undone"	3:38
5.	"After All This Time"	4:34
6.	"Over the Fields"	4:27
7.	"Just Kids"	4:39
8.	"Don't Worry What the Experts Say"	4:23
9.	"See Yourself"	5:18
10.	"Vincent"	4:56
11.	"Your Words"	3:41

== Personnel ==
- Heather Nova – acoustic guitar, vocals, melodica
- Vincent Lions – guitar
- Midori Jaeger – cello and piano
- Geoff Dugmore – drums
- Youth – bass guitar

== Charts ==
Chart (2019)	Peak position
Belgian Albums (Ultratop Flanders)	32
Belgian Albums (Ultratop Wallonia)	99
Dutch Albums (Album Top 100)	24
German Albums (Offizielle Top 100)	21
Swiss Albums (Schweizer Hitparade)	57
UK Independent Albums (OCC)	16
