= Bojesen =

Bojesen is a surname. Notable people with the surname include:

- Gudrun Bojesen (born 1976), Danish ballet dancer
- Kay Bojesen (1886–1958), Danish silversmith and designer
- Louisa Bojesen (born 1974), Danish-American financial journalist
- Michael Bojesen (born 1960), Danish conductor, composer, choirmaster and arranger
