= Circle (Scala & Kolacny Brothers album) =

Studio album by Scala & Kolacny Brothers
- Released: August 2010
- Genre: Choral
- Length: 60:50
- Label: Wall of Sound

Scala & Kolacny Brothers chronology
| Dans les yeux d'Aurore (2008) | Circle (2010) | Scala & Kolacny Brothers (2011) |

Circle is a studio album by Scala & Kolacny Brothers released in 2010.

== Track listing ==
| No. | Title | Writer(s) | Original artist | Length |
|---|---|---|---|---|
| 1. | "Nothing Else Matters" | James Hetfield; Lars Ulrich | Metallica | 5:10 |
| 2. | "Viva la Vida" | Coldplay | Coldplay | 4:47 |
| 3. | "Suzanne" | Leonard Cohen | Leonard Cohen | 5:10 |
| 4. | "California Dreamin'" | Michelle Phillips; John Phillips | The Mamas & the Papas | 3:12 |
| 5. | "Ironic" | Alanis Morissette; Glen Ballard | Alanis Morissette | 4:18 |
| 6. | "Solsbury Hill" | Peter Gabriel | Peter Gabriel | 4:11 |
| 7. | "Bad" | U2 | U2 | 7:05 |
| 8. | "Champagne Supernova" | Noel Gallagher | Oasis | 7:05 |
| 9. | "I Feel You" | Martin Gore | Depeche Mode | 3:41 |
| 10. | "Use Somebody" | Kings of Leon | Kings of Leon | 3:36 |
| 11. | "Lithium" | Kurt Cobain | Nirvana | 7:03 |
| 12. | "Evigheden" (2010 re-recording) | Michael Bojesen; Ellen Heiberg | Michael Bojesen | 5:25 |
| Total length: | | | | 60:50 |

Bonus disc
| No. | Title | Lyrics | Music | Original artist | Length |
|---|---|---|---|---|---|
| 1. | "Hungriges Herz" | Maria Mummert | Gunnar Spies | MIA. | 3:54 |
| 2. | "Durch den Monsun" | Bill Kaulitz; Dave Roth; Patrick Benzner; David Jost | Peter Hoffmann; Dave Roth; Patrick Benzner; David Jost | Tokio Hotel | 4:58 |
| 3. | "Was wir alleine nicht schaffen" | Xavier Naidoo | Xavier Naidoo; Philippe van Eecke | Xavier Naidoo | 5:53 |
| 4. | "Kleiner Mann" | Steven Kolacny | Steven Kolacny | | 3:22 |
| 5. | "Last Xmas" | George Michael | George Michael | Wham! | 5:14 |
| 6. | "Creep" | Radiohead; Albert Hammond; Mike Hazlewood | Radiohead; Albert Hammond; Mike Hazlewood | Radiohead | 4:53 |
| 7. | "It Never Will Come Back" | Steven Kolacny | Steven Kolacny | | 4:24 |
| 8. | "Splinter" | Jo Dawson | Steven Kolacny | | 3:43 |
| 9. | "Seashell" | Jo Dawson | Steven Kolacny | | 3:27 |
| 10. | "Raintears" | Jo Dawson | Steven Kolacny | | 4:50 |
| 11. | "Paper Plane" | Vincent Neyt | Steven Kolacny | | 3:19 |
| 12. | "A Little More Each Time" | Vincent Neyt | Steven Kolacny | | 2:57 |
| 13. | "Magic" | Vincent Neyt | Steven Kolacny | | 5:27 |
| Total length: | | | | | 56:43 |

== Credits ==
Writing, performance and production credits are adapted from the album liner notes.

=== Personnel ===
==== Scala & Kolacny Brothers ====
- Scala – choir
- Stijn Kolacny – vocal conduct
- Steven Kolacny – piano, keyboards, arrangement

==== Additional musicians ====
- Koen Buyse – additional sounds on "Lithium", "It Never Will Come Back", "Splinter", "Seashell", "Raintears", "Paper Plane", "A Little More Each Time", "Magic"
- David Demeyere – drums on "It Never Will Come Back", "Splinter", "Seashell", "Raintears", "Paper Plane", "A Little More Each Time", "Magic"

==== Production ====
- Filip Heurckmans – recording, mixing, mastering
- Koen Buyse – production on "It Never Will Come Back", "Splinter", "Seashell", "Raintears", "Paper Plane", "A Little More Each Time", "Magic"
- Bas Reemans – engineering (drums only)

==== Visual art ====
- www.topfloor.to – artwork
- Jane Stockdale – photography
- Joris Ceuppens – photography
- Ignace van Parys – photography
- Bert Ceulemans – photography

=== Studios ===
- Galaxy Studio, Mol, Belgium
- Art Sound Studio, Houthalen-Helchteren, Belgium

== Charts ==
| Chart | Peak position |
|---|---|
| Belgian Albums (Ultratop Flanders) | 39 |
| Belgian Albums (Ultratop Wallonia) | 32 |
| German Albums (Offizielle Top 100) | 68 |
