= Jane Fallon =

English author and producer (born 1960)

- Born: Jane Elizabeth Mary Fallon; 9 December 1960 (age 65); Harrow, London, England
- Education: University College London
- Occupations: Novelist; producer
- Partner: Ricky Gervais (1982–present)
- Writing career
- Period: 1994–present
- Genres: Romance; comedy
- Website: janefallonauthor.com

Jane Elizabeth Mary Fallon (born 9 December 1960) is an English author and television producer.

== Early life and education ==
Fallon was born as the youngest of five children in Harrow, northwest London. Her father was Irish, from Dublin, with roots in Athlone. Fallon's family moved to Buckinghamshire when she was a child, and she grew up in a flat above her parents' newsagent's shop.

She was educated at St Bernard's Convent School in Slough, Berkshire, and University College London, where she studied history, graduating with a bachelor of arts in 1982. Alongside her studies, she started writing for the history department's magazine, for the university newspaper, London Student, and for Pi Magazine.

== Career ==
After her studies, she began working for a theatrical literary agency. After a few years there, she decided to become a freelance script reader and script editor for different theatrical productions and television, and in 1994, she advanced to become a producer on the series EastEnders. This was followed by a number of awarded series, such as This Life, 20 Things to Do Before You're 30, and Teachers.

By 2006, Fallon had decided to leave television and become a full-time novelist. A year later, she debuted with her first national bestseller, Getting Rid of Matthew. She has followed this with Got You Back, Foursome, The Ugly Sister, Skeletons, Strictly Between Us, My Sweet Revenge, Faking Friends, Tell Me a Secret, Queen Bee, Worst. Idea. Ever. and Just Got Real. Her books have been translated into more than 20 languages.

Her 2008 novel, Got You Back, was made into a musical titled Joyride, with music by the Swedish pop group Roxette. The world premiere took place in Sweden at Malmö Opera on 6 September 2024.

In 2011, Foursome was nominated for the Melissa Nathan Award for Romantic Comedy Fiction and in 2018, Faking Friends was nominated in the popular fiction category of the National Book Awards. In 2019, it was longlisted for the Comedy Women in Print Prize. In 2020, she was awarded an honorary fellowship of University College London.

== Personal life ==
Fallon has been in a relationship with comedian Ricky Gervais since 1982; they met while studying at University College London. The couple have lived together since 1984 and reside in Hampstead. Fallon's niece, Elsie Fallon, is an actress. Fallon was diagnosed with breast cancer in 2026 and is set to undergo surgery.

== Filmography (producer) ==
- EastEnders (1985–1994)
- This Life (1996–1997)
- Undercover Heart (1998)
- Massive Landmarks of the 20th Century (1999)
- Teachers (2001)
- 20 Things to Do Before You're 30 (2002)
- Single (2003)

== Bibliography ==
All published by Penguin, unless otherwise stated:

- Getting Rid of Matthew (2007) ISBN 0141025298 (featured in the 2007 Richard and Judy Book Club)
- Got You Back (2008) ISBN 0141034408
- Foursome (2010) ISBN 1782920307
- The Ugly Sister (2011) Pub. CB Creative Books ISBN 1782920323
- Skeletons (2014) ISBN 1444825232
- Strictly Between Us (2016) ISBN 1405917679
- My Sweet Revenge (2017) ISBN 9781405917759
- Faking Friends (2018) ISBN 9781405933094
- Tell Me a Secret (2019) ISBN 1405933127
- Queen Bee (2020) ISBN 1405943343 (featured in the 2020 Richard and Judy Book Club)
- Worst. Idea. Ever. (2021) ISBN 0241515335 (shortlisted at the British Book Awards for "Page Turner of the Year" in May 2022)
- Just Got Real (2022) ISBN 1405951117
- Over Sharing (2023) ISBN 9781405951135
- Welcome to the Neighbourhood (2026) ISBN 9781405951098
