= Glow Stars =

Studio album by Heather Nova
- Released: May 17, 1993
- Recorded: Early 1993
- Genre: Indie rock
- Length: 44:30
- Label: Butterfly; Big Life
- Producer: Felix Tod

Heather Nova chronology
Glow Stars (1993)	Blow (1993)

Professional ratings
Review scores
Source	Rating
AllMusic	3/5 stars
The Virgin Encyclopedia of Nineties Music	3/5 stars

Glow Stars is the debut studio album by Heather Nova, released in 1993.

== Critical reception ==
AllMusic wrote: "'Ear to the Ground' and the title track shimmer with sweet acoustic guitars, while tracks like 'Bare' and 'Spirit in You' prance around dark melodies steeped in hollow dreamscapes."

== Track listing ==
All songs written by Heather Nova.

1. "Bare" – 4:24
2. "My Fidelity" – 4:21
3. "Spirit in You" – 4:00
4. "Shell" – 4:10
5. "Glow Stars" – 3:07
6. "Ear to the Ground" – 4:40
7. "Second Skin" – 3:48
8. "Mothertongue" – 3:24
9. "All the Way" – 1:10
10. "Frontier" – 4:13
11. "Shaking the Doll" – 3:50
12. "Talking to Strangers" – 3:23

== Personnel ==
- Heather Nova – guitar, keyboards, vocals
- David Ayers – guitar
- Danny Hammond – guitar
- Colin Payne – keyboards

=== Production ===
- Felix Tod – producer, engineer, mixing
- Colin Payne – string arrangements
- Andy Vella – cover photo
