= 300 Days at Sea =

300 Days At Sea

Studio album by Heather Nova
- Released: 25 September 2011
- Recorded: 2010
- Genre: Alternative Rock, Indie rock
- Label: Saltwater Records, licensed to Embassy of Music.
- Producer: Felix Tod and David Ayers

Heather Nova chronology
The Jasmine Flower (2008)	300 Days At Sea (2011)	The Way It Feels (2015)

Professional ratings
Review scores
Source	Rating
Allmusic	3.5/5 stars
York Press	3/5 stars

300 Days At Sea is the eighth studio album by Bermudian singer-songwriter Heather Nova, released in 25 September 2011. It was recorded in her home studio on a small island in Bermuda in 2010. Nova recorded nineteen tracks although not all made the final album cut. The album was produced and recorded by Felix Tod and David Ayers using only solar power. The album was produced with support of a crowdfunding project.

The album went top 40 in five European countries on release, with reviews calling it Heather's best album since 'Oyster', and marked a return to the full band sound of the early albums. The first single was 'Higher Ground' which got more radio airplay than any Heather Nova song to date.

== Track listing ==
All tracks are written by Heather Nova.

300 Days at Sea track listing
No.	Title	Length
1.	"Beautiful Ride"	4:26
2.	"Higher Ground"	4:16
3.	"Stop the Fire"	3:52
4.	"Save a Little Piece of Tomorrow"	4:56
5.	"Everything Changes"	3:39
6.	"Do Something That Scares You"	4:32
7.	"The Good Ship "Moon""	3:44
8.	"Turn the Compass Round"	3:48
9.	"Burning to Love"	4:20
10.	"I'd Rather Be"	3:58
11.	"Until the Race Is Run"	4:26
12.	"Stay"	4:36
13.	"Precious Thing" (bonus track on limited editions with bonus DVD)	4:29

iTunes deluxe version
No.	Title	Length
13.	"He's Spiritual"	4:07
14.	"You're a Rainbow"	3:23
15.	"Over You"	4:18
16.	"When the Music Stops"	4:04
17.	"Precious Thing"	4:31

== Charts ==
Chart performance for 300 Days at Sea
Chart (2011)	Peak position
Austrian Albums (Ö3 Austria)	48
Belgian Albums (Ultratop Flanders)	42
Belgian Albums (Ultratop Wallonia)	74
Dutch Albums (Album Top 100)	38
German Albums (Offizielle Top 100)	25
Swiss Albums (Schweizer Hitparade)	47
