= 'Til We're Dead =

Studio album by Eskobar
- Released: April 1, 2000
- Producer: Lars Halapi

'Til We're Dead is the Swedish pop group Eskobar's debut album, released on April 1, 2000. It was produced by Lars Halapi and recorded at Södra studio in Stockholm.

Singles released from the album include "On a Train" (1999), "Good Day for Dying" (2000), and "Tumbling Down" (2000). None of the singles charted. The album spent four weeks on the Swedish Albums Chart, peaking at number 46. Several tracks from the album have been used in various films. "Tumbling Down" is featured in the film Om inte (2001) and the TV movie Seventeen - Mädchen sind die besseren Jungs (2003). "On a Train" is included in the TV series Brothers & Sisters (episode Freeluc.com, 2010). "Someone Told Me" and "Angels" are featured in the film Road to Italy (2005).

== Reception ==
Nöjesguiden gave the album a largely negative review, stating "To call them the biggest Swedish debutant hope of the spring is quite an exaggeration, but occasionally they have something that makes you listen more than just out of obligation" Dagens skiva was much more positive and gave the album a rating of 9/10. Reviewer Fredrik Welander called the album an "outstanding debut" and wrote "The album is consistent, but there are some highlights.

The opening track 'Tumbling Down' is almost a masterpiece. The aforementioned 'Good Day for Dying' is likewise. 'She's Not Here' is also a standout." But as mentioned, Eskobar feels like a well-rounded album band."

'Til We're Dead was nominated for a Grammis in 2001 in the category "Best Pop/Rock".

== Track listing ==
All tracks are written by Eskobar.

1. "Tumbling Down" – 3:40
2. "On a Train" – 3:13
3. "Good Day for Dying" – 3:31
4. "Sun in My Eyes" – 3:20
5. "Angels" – 3:17
6. "Someone Told Me" – 3:46
7. "So" – 2:59
8. "She's Not Here" – 3:58
9. "Love" – 3:09
10. "On My Side" – 3:36

=== European release ===
1. "Tumbling Down" – 3:40
2. "On a Train" – 3:13
3. "Good Day for Dying" – 3:31
4. "Sun in My Eyes" – 3:20
5. "Angels" – 3:17
6. "Someone Told Me" – 3:46
7. "So" – 2:59
8. "She's Not Here" – 3:58
9. "Love" – 3:09
10. "On My Side" – 3:36
11. "Tumbling Down" (Dead. Mono Version) – 3:36

== Charts ==
Chart (2000)	Peak position
Sweden	46
