= The Way It Feels (Heather Nova album) =

Studio album by Heather Nova
- Released: May 29, 2015
- Genre: Alternative rock; indie rock
- Length: 58:38
- Label: Embassy of Music; Saltwater Limited

Heather Nova chronology
300 Days at Sea (2011)	The Way It Feels (2015)	Pearl (2019)

The Way It Feels is the ninth studio album by Heather Nova, released on May 29, 2015.

== Track listing ==
All tracks are written by Heather Nova.

The Way It Feels track listing
No.	Title	Length
1.	"Treehouse"	5:15
2.	"Sea Glass"	3:56
3.	"The Archaeologist"	4:06
4.	"Girl on the Mountain"	5:19
5.	"Lie Down in the Bed You've Made"	3:34
6.	"On My Radar"	4:32
7.	"Sleeping Dogs"	4:29
8.	"Sea Change"	3:48
9.	"This Humanness"	4:39
10.	"I'm Air"	3:55
11.	"Women's Hands"	5:28
12.	"Moon River Days"	4:22
13.	"Earth Is My Heaven" (bonus track)	5:15
14.	"Serengeti" (bonus track)	5:18

== Charts ==
Chart performance for The Way It Feels
Chart (2015)	Peak position
Belgian Albums (Ultratop Flanders)	34
Belgian Albums (Ultratop Wallonia)	116
Dutch Albums (Album Top 100)	25
German Albums (Offizielle Top 100)	64
