= Siren (Heather Nova album) =

Studio album by Heather Nova
- Released: 2 June 1998
- Studios: Townhouse Studios (London); Real World Studios (Box); Olympic Studios (London); September Sound (Twickenham); Battery Studios (London); Roundhouse Studios (London); Abbey Road Studios (London)
- Genres: Alternative rock; alternative pop; folk rock
- Length: 60:53
- Labels: Big Cat/Work (North America); V2 (United Kingdom)
- Producers: Jon Kelly (Note: Track 1, 4, 7, 12, 13.); Felix Tod (Note: Tracks 2, 5, 8–10, 14.); Youth (Note: Tracks 3, 6, 11.)

Heather Nova chronology
Oyster (1994)	Siren (1998)	Wonderlust (2000)

Siren is the third studio album by singer-songwriter Heather Nova, released in 1998.

== Recording ==
Recording of Siren took place mostly in London at Townhouse Studios, Olympic Studios, Battery Studios, Roundhouse Studios, and Abbey Road Studios. Additional recording occurred at Real World Studios in Box, Wiltshire, and September Sound in Twickenham.

== Critical reception ==
Professional ratings
Review scores
Source	Rating
AllMusic	4/5 stars
Entertainment Weekly	C−
Pitchfork	7.0/10
Press & Sun-Bulletin	B+
San Francisco Chronicle	3/4 stars
Slant Magazine	4/5 stars
The Times	8/10 stars
The Virgin Encyclopedia of Nineties Music	3/5 stars

The Washington Post wrote: "The singer and three different producers have combined folk-rock guitar, discreet synthbeats and lush keyboards and strings into a deftly eclectic contemporary sound. The only time this slick pop-rock doesn't upstage Nova's sensibility, however, is when she's dispensing the breathless come-ons of songs like 'Make You Mine'."

AllMusic concluded that "it's Nova's unique vocal style and winning pop sensibilities that make Siren work as well as it does, doing double duty as substantive singer/songwriter statement and perfect pop-radio product."

Pitchfork's Susan Moll praised the album, writing that Nova "creates memorable femme- pop with brains, wit and bite, delving into the core of human emotion and stripping away its cliches in the process," while the publication went on to include it in their list of the best albums of the year.

Andy Stevens of the Press & Sun-Bulletin likened the album's sound to "if Emmylou Harris made pop music," also drawing comparisons to the albums of Liz Phair and Paula Cole, adding that it has "a spiritual and emotional openness."

== Track listing ==
All tracks are written by Heather Nova

No.	Title	Length
1.	"London Rain (Nothing Heals Me Like You Do)"	3:49
2.	"Blood of Me"	3:59
3.	"Heart and Shoulder"	3:58
4.	"What a Feeling"	4:46
5.	"Valley of Sound"	4:20
6.	"I'm the Girl"	5:23
7.	"Winterblue"	4:56
8.	"I'm Alive"	3:40
9.	"Widescreen"	4:19
10.	"Paper Cup"	3:29
11.	"Avalanche"	4:07
12.	"Make You Mine"	4:56
13.	"Ruby Red"	4:05
14.	"Not Only Human"	5:06
Total length:		60:53

Australian bonus disc
No.	Title	Length
15.	"Grow Young"	3:11
16.	"Water from Wine"	3:15
17.	"London Rain (acoustic)"	3:57
18.	"Blind"	6:18
19.	"Walk This World (acoustic)"

Japanese bonus tracks
No.	Title	Length
15.	"Grow Young"	3:11
16.	"Water from Wine"	3:15
17.	"London Rain (acoustic)"	3:57

B-sides
No.	Title	Writer	Length
1.	"London Rain (acoustic)"		3:57
2.	"Days and Nights"		5:22
3.	"The Ship Song"	Nick Cave	3:21
4.	"Nothing"		4:45
5.	"Many Rivers to Cross"		3:23
6.	"Grow Young"		3:11
7.	"Water from Wine"		3:15

== Personnel ==
Musicians

- Heather Nova – vocals, acoustic guitar, violin
- David Ayers – guitar (14)
- Marcus Cliffe – bass guitar (4)
- Danny Cummings – percussion
- Geoff Dugmore – drums
- Guy Fletcher – piano, Hammond organ, tamboura, mellotron, Hawaiian guitar, Wurlitzer
- Nikolaj Juel – guitar, Moog synthesizer, Fender Rhodes
- Nadia Lanman – cello
- Monti – drums (2, 5, 8, 9)
- John Moore – saw
- Paul Sandrone – bass guitar
- Satin Singh – percussion
- Neil Taylor – guitar
- Youth – guitar (6), bass guitar (3, 6, 11)

Production

- Jon Kelly, Felix Tod, Youth – producers
- Lorraine Francis, Hugo Nicholson, Andrew Scarth – engineers
- Anne Dudley, Andy Green, Jon Kelly, Will Malone, Hugo Nicholson, Andy Wallace – mixing
- Steve Sisco – mixing assistant
- Roger Lian, Howie Weinberg – mastering
- Brian Fanning – PQ editing
- Jason Mayo, Felix Tod – programming
- Mike Diver, Heather Nova – photography
- Emma Jones – recording assistant

== Charts ==
=== Weekly charts ===
Weekly chart performance for Siren
Chart (1998–1999)	Peak position
Australian Albums (ARIA)	90
Austrian Albums (Ö3 Austria)	24
Belgian Albums (Ultratop Flanders)	16
Dutch Albums (Album Top 100)	48
French Albums (SNEP)	60
German Albums (Offizielle Top 100)	13
New Zealand Albums (RMNZ)	18
Norwegian Albums (VG-lista)	32
Swedish Albums (Sverigetopplistan)	33
Swiss Albums (Schweizer Hitparade)	28
UK Albums (Official Charts)	55
UK Independent Albums (Official Charts)	4
US Billboard 200	176
US Billboard Heatseekers	12
Scottish Albums (Official Charts)	88
European Albums (Eurotipsheet)	36

=== Year-end charts ===
Year-end chart performance for Siren
Chart (1998)	Position
German Albums Chart	93

=== Singles ===
Chart performance for singles from Siren
Year	Single	Chart	Position
1998	"London Rain (Nothing Heals Me Like You Do)"	US Billboard Adult Top 40	31
