= South (Heather Nova album) =

Studio album by Heather Nova
- Released: December 11, 2001
- Recorded: 2001
- Genre: Soul, alternative pop, pop rock
- Length: 52:40
- Label: V2
- Producer: See Track listing for producer(s)

Heather Nova chronology
Wonderlust (2000)	South (2001)	Storm (2003)

Professional ratings
Aggregate scores
Source	Rating
Metacritic	69/100 link
Review scores
Source	Rating
Rolling Stone	link

South is the fourth studio album by Heather Nova. There were two versions of this album—the original release on December 11, 2001, and an American release on May 21, 2002. The US release contained one extra track, "Welcome", which also appeared on the 2005 album Redbird. "Virus of the Mind" was released as a single in the United States.

The album was recorded in London, New York, Sweden and Los Angeles and featured Bernard Butler on some of the tracks.

For this album, Nova also recorded a contemporary-styled cover of the standard "Gloomy Sunday", a song originally made popular by Billie Holiday. In retrospect, Nova found the album to be far too polished and not entirely to her liking. She declared that her next album, Storm, would be bare and would be the album she's always wanted to make.

== Track listing ==
All songs by Heather Nova, except where noted.

=== European release ===
1. "If I Saw You in a Movie" – 4:06; produced by Felix Tod
2. "Talk to Me" – 4:05; produced by Felix Tod
3. "Virus of the Mind" – 4:13; produced by Paul Fox
4. "Like Lovers Do" – 4:11; produced by Eve Nelson
5. "Waste the Day" – 3:34; produced by Felix Tod
6. "Heaven Sent" – 4:14; produced by Peter Kvint and Simon Nordberg
7. "It's Only Love" – 4:34; produced by Felix Tod
8. "I'm No Angel" (Bernard Butler, Nova) – 3:58; produced by Bernard Butler and Felix Tod
9. "Help Me Be Good to You" – 3:53; produced by Felix Tod
10. "When Somebody Turns You On" – 3:46; produced by Felix Tod
11. "Gloomy Sunday" (Holman, Javor, Seress) – 4:09; produced by D.F. Petersen
12. "Tested" – 3:26; produced by Felix Tod
13. "Just Been Born" – 4:30; produced by Felix Tod
  - "The Man in the Ocean - 4:41; Japan bonus track

=== U.S. release ===
1. "Welcome" (Armstrong, Campbell, Nova) – 4:19; produced by The Matrix
2. "If I Saw You in a Movie" – 4:04
3. "Talk to Me" – 4:05
4. "Heaven Sent" – 4:14
5. "Help Me Be Good to You" – 3:51
6. "Like Lovers Do" – 4:05
7. "Virus of the Mind" – 4:13
8. "It's Only Love" – 4:34
9. "When Somebody Turns You On" – 3:43
10. "Waste the Day" – 3:31
11. "I'm No Angel" (Bernard Butler, Nova) – 3:49
12. "Tested" – 3:26
13. "Gloomy Sunday" (Holman, Javor, Seress) – 4:09
14. "Just Been Born" – 4:30

B Sides

1. "Sweet November" ""I'm No Angel" single & "Virus of the Mind" single
2. "Paint the World" "Virus of the Mind" single
3. "In the Garden" "I'm No Angel" single
4. "Tested" (band version) "I'm No Angel" single
5. "Man in the Ocean" "I'm No Angel" single

== Personnel ==
- Heather Nova – vocals, theremin, glockenspiel, acoustic guitar
- Bryan Adams – guitar, backing vocals
- Felix Tod – programming
- Paul Pimsler – guitar
- Hugh Elliott – drums
- Eve Nelson – keyboards, drum programming
- Davey Faragher – bass guitar
- Mark Goldenberg – guitar
- Jerker Odelholm – bass guitar
- Corky James – guitar
- Andreas Dahlback – drums, tambourine
- Carol Steele – percussion
- Simon Nordberg – programming
- Peter Kvint – acoustic guitar, backing vocals, electric guitar
- Art Hodge – programming
- Mike Stanzilis – bass guitar
- Glenn Scott – piano, Hammond organ
- Berit Fridahl – guitar
- Bernard Butler – guitar, electric piano
- Steve Hansen – programming
- Laurie Jenkins – drums, percussion
- David Ayers – electric guitar, slide guitar
- Bastian Juel – bass guitar, piano

== Charts ==
Chart performance for South
Chart (2001)	Peak position
Austrian Albums (Ö3 Austria)	35
Belgian Albums (Ultratop Flanders)	17
Belgian Albums (Ultratop Wallonia)	38
Dutch Albums (Album Top 100)	35
French Albums (SNEP)	54
German Albums (Offizielle Top 100)	5
Swedish Albums (Sverigetopplistan)	30
Swiss Albums (Schweizer Hitparade)	21
UK Independent Albums (OCC)	34
European Albums (Eurotipsheet)	26
