= Blow (Heather Nova album) =

Live album by Heather Nova
- Released: October 18, 1993
- Recorded: The Powerhouse and Mean Fiddler, London, July, 1993
- Genre: Indie rock
- Length: 42:59
- Label: Butterfly
- Producer: Felix Tod

Heather Nova chronology
Glow Stars (1993)	Blow (1993)	Oyster (1994)

Professional ratings
Review scores
Source	Rating
Allmusic	link
The Virgin Encyclopedia of Nineties Music	3/5 stars

Blow is a live album by singer-songwriter Heather Nova, released in 1993.

== Track listing ==
All songs written by Heather Nova.

1. "Light Years" – 5:24
2. "Sugar" – 6:48
3. "Maybe an Angel" – 6:31
4. "Blessed" – 2:37
5. "Mothertongue" – 3:21
6. "Talking to Strangers" – 5:05
7. "Shaking the Doll" – 4:16
8. "Frontier" – 5:17
9. "Doubled Up" – 3:40

== Personnel ==
- Heather Nova – guitar, vocals
- David Ayers – guitar
- Maz de Chastelaine – cello
- Nadia Lanman – cello (1, 8 & 9)
- Dean McCormick – drums (1, 8 & 9)
- Cocoa Solid – bass
- Richard Thair – drums

=== Production ===
- Felix Tod – producer
- KK, Felix Tod – engineers
- Caroline Smith – design
- Heather Nova – illustrations
- Kevin Westenberg – photography
