= The Sorrowjoy =

Studio album by Heather Nova
- Released: 2006
- Genre: Indie rock, Spoken word

Heather Nova chronology
Redbird (2005)	The Sorrowjoy (2006)	The Jasmine Flower (2008)

The Sorrowjoy is an album of poetry by Heather Nova, released in March 2006. The album has only been available for purchase at concerts beginning with the Intimate Evening tour, from the fan-run websites HeatherNova.Net and HeatherNova.De, and from the official website, HeatherNova.Com.

The album features Heather Nova reading 44 of the 45 poems from her book of the same name (ISBN 0-9542115-0-2) set to ambient music arranged by Felix Tod. The only poem from the book that was not recorded on the CD is "The Wonder Is Returning".

Some of the music consists of simple sounds, such as a wind effect heard over the poem "Soon Alaska". Other music is actually taken from Heather Nova's songs, such as the music from "Sugar" that can be heard on "Six Years Behind". Most of the music is of unknown origin, probably original compositions by Felix Tod.

The track "The Wave" from The Sorrowjoy is included in Nova's 2011 EP, Higher Ground.

== Track listing ==
All tracks by Heather Nova.

1. "The Singing State" – 1:19
2. "The Bad Blood and the Rose" – 1:09
3. "The Homeopath" – 1:30
4. "Looking for Home" – 0:54
5. "The Poison" – 1:05
6. "Ode to My Grandparents" – 2:28
7. "You Moved Like an Animal" – 1:14
8. "Sucking Out the Sting" – 1:25
9. "Six Years Behind" – 0:47
10. "Please Please You" – 0:58
11. "Real Is My Only Real Friend" – 0:31
12. "Murmur" – 0:41
13. "Winged Messenger" – 0:57
14. "Prescription of Dreams" – 1:13
15. "Rain in the Tropics" – 0:50
16. "Respect for the Dead" – 1:24
17. "At Sea" – 2:08
18. "A Simple Grace" – 0:52
19. "Like Spiders" – 0:50
20. "The Girl" – 0:51
21. "The Bridge" – 1:05
22. "Into the Pink" – 1:22
23. "My Body Will Not Be Fooled" – 1:15
24. "This Is the Colour of You" – 0:35
25. "The Abandon" – 1:18
26. "In Your Hands I'd Be a Planet" – 0:35
27. "Soon Alaska" – 0:42
28. "Cracking the Code" – 1:12
29. "Firefly Dreams" – 1:00
30. "The Amber" – 0:50
31. "Joy" – 1:26
32. "Nothing in Between" – 1:02
33. "Digital" – 1:32
34. "The Wave" – 1:27
35. "The Bowerbird" – 1:07
36. "Blue Eyed Lion" – 1:06
37. "Though I Am Not Known Here" – 0:47
38. "I Cannot Say Yes" – 0:50
39. "Moods" – 0:24
40. "I Can Smell the Rain Coming" – 0:41
41. "Paradise Is Harder to Digest Alone" – 1:01
42. "Loss and Passion" – 0:29
43. "My Father" – 0:56
44. "Eastern Blue Cut" – 0:52
