= Storm (Heather Nova album) =

Studio album by Heather Nova
- Released: September 8, 2003
- Genre: Indie rock
- Length: 39:09
- Label: Big Cat

Heather Nova chronology
South (2001)	Storm (2003)	Redbird (2005)

Professional ratings
Review scores
Source	Rating
North Yorkshire County Publications	3/5 stars

Storm is the fifth studio album by Heather Nova, released in 2003 as the follow-up to South (2001). It was her first independent record since departing from the label V2 Records; Nova financed the album herself and released it in a handful of countries. The large United States market was not included, but in 2007, Nova reported on her official website that she was working out a way to distribute her releases in America.

The album itself was a collaboration with the band Mercury Rev.

The track "Let's Not Talk About Love" features vocals from French artist Benjamin Biolay.

The lead single "River of Life" did little to help album sales due to its lack of a radio-friendly sound (that dominated South) or commercial ability. Nova fans may interpret the lack of pop flourishes to be a testament to a love of music and her desire to further develop as an artist rather than succumb to commercial pressures (which Nova cited as being her reason for leaving her previous label.)

Upon the release of Redbird, an article written in promotion by Nova's record label offered a sales figure of 400,000 copies for Storm, a strong figure for an independent release with limited distribution and lack of any radio play for the single.

== Track listing ==
All songs written by Heather Nova.

1. "Let's Not Talk About Love" – 3:20
2. "You Left Me a Song" – 3:37
3. "Drink It In" – 2:55
4. "River of Life" – 3:23
5. "One Day in June" – 4:34
6. "Storm" – 3:14
7. "I Wanna Be Your Light" – 4:16
8. "Aquamarine" – 2:52
9. "All I Need" – 3:35
10. "Everytime" – 3:08
11. "Fool for You" – 4:15

== Charts ==
Chart performance for Storm
Chart (2003)	Peak position
Austrian Albums (Ö3 Austria)	18
Belgian Albums (Ultratop Flanders)	9
Dutch Albums (Album Top 100)	22
French Albums (SNEP)	45
German Albums (Offizielle Top 100)	5
Swedish Albums (Sverigetopplistan)	19
Swiss Albums (Schweizer Hitparade)	12
UK Independent Albums (OCC)	25
