= Walk This World =

1995 single by Heather Nova

Single by Heather Nova

from the album Oyster
- Released: 6 February 1995
- Length: 3:49
- Label: Butterfly; Big Life
- Songwriter: Heather Nova
- Producers: Felix Tod; Youth

Heather Nova singles chronology
"Walk This World" (1995)	"Maybe an Angel" (1995)

Music video
- "Walk This World" (live) on YouTube

"Walk This World" is a song by Bermudian singer-songwriter Heather Nova. Released in February 1995 by Butterfly Records as her first single, the song was included on her second studio album, Oyster (1994). Nova wrote the lyrics while Felix Tod and Youth produced it. The song was a top-20 hit in New Zealand as well as on the Canadian RPM Alternative 30 chart. In the US, it peaked at number 69 on the Cash Box Top 100 and number 13 on the Billboard Modern Rock Tracks chart. The accompanying music video was directed by American film director Zack Snyder and filmed all around the world. It depicts Nova playing on her guitar and singing the song at the different locations. "Walk This World" is the singer's most well-known song, which has led to Nova being considered a one hit wonder in many countries.

== Critical reception ==
Steve Baltin from Cash Box wrote, "Nova is a new singer/songwriter with a gift for words behind her Tom Petty-like rock riffs. Whereas most female singer/songwriters are being placed on Modern Rock outlets, Nova’s roots are in rock. Yet the crossover success of Jeff Buckley indicates that she will likely find acceptance from those outlets. A strong singer as well. Nova has made a memorable first impression." Johnny Cigarettes from NME noted "the irresistible spirit of a stirring mini-epic blowing across this song."

== Charts ==
=== Weekly charts ===
Weekly chart performance for "Walk This World"
Chart (1995)	Peak position
Australia (ARIA)	28
Canada Rock/Alternative (RPM)	19
Germany (GfK)	91
Israel (Israeli Singles Chart)	2
New Zealand (Recorded Music NZ)	19
UK Singles (Official Charts)	69
US Modern Rock Tracks (Billboard)	13
US Cash Box Top 100	69

=== Year-end charts ===
Year-end chart performance for "Walk This World"
Chart (1995)	Position
Israel (Israeli Singles Chart)	48

== Release history ==
Release dates and formats for "Walk This World"
Region	Date	Format(s)	Label(s)	Ref.
United Kingdom	6 February 1995	CD; cassette	Butterfly; Big Life	
Australia	13 February 1995	CD; cassette	Liberation; Butterfly; Big Life	
United States	14 August 1995	Alternative radio	Big Cat; Work	
United States	12 September 1995	Contemporary hit radio	Big Cat; Work	
Japan	21 September 1995	CD	Sony	
