= Wonderlust =

Live album by Heather Nova
- Released: July 3, 2000
- Recorded: E Werk in Cologne, Germany
- Genre: Indie rock
- Length: 69:17
- Label: V2

Heather Nova chronology
Siren (1998)	Wonderlust (2000)	South (2001)

Wonderlust is a live album by Heather Nova, released in 2000. The album was recorded live in Germany and includes a cover version of Bruce Springsteen’s "I'm on Fire" which has been described as a surprise. The whole sound has been noted as Nova '...possessing a fine backing band, but it's Nova's smooth then jagged vocals that steal the show'

Professional ratings
Review scores
Source	Rating
Allmusic	link

== Track listing ==
1. "Winterblue" – 5:58
2. "Walk This World" – 4:20
3. "Island" – 5:51
4. "Heart and Shoulder" – 4:18
5. "Paper Cup" – 3:59
6. "London Rain (Nothing Heals Me Like You Do)" – 4:13
7. "Not Only Human" – 5:15
8. "Doubled Up" – 3:42
9. "Truth and Bone" – 4:29
10. "I'm the Girl" – 5:28
11. "Heal" – 3:56
12. "Make You Mine" – 5:36
13. "Sugar" – 8:29
14. "I'm on Fire (Bruce Springsteen) – 3:43

== Personnel ==
- Heather Nova – vocals, guitar
- Berit Fridahl – lead guitars
- Bastian Juel – bass, backing vocals
- Laurie Jenkins – drums
- Nadia Lanman – cello
- Felix Tod - mixing, recording
