= Redbird (Heather Nova album) =

Studio album by Heather Nova
- Released: August 30, 2005
- Genre: Indie rock
- Length: 51:17

Heather Nova chronology
Storm (2003)	Redbird (2005)	The Sorrowjoy (2006)

Redbird is the sixth studio album by Heather Nova, released on August 30, 2005. The album includes a cover of Chris Isaak's "Wicked Game". The first track, "Welcome", was also released in 2005 as a single in Europe. "Welcome" also appeared on the U.S./Canadian release of South. The album was produced by Nova's husband and long term producer Felix Tod, except for "Welcome" which was produced by The Matrix. When talking about the album, Heather has said:

It was probably the most difficult album I have ever made because for the first time I had something else besides music (my baby) taking up my time and attention. So instead of having endless days with nothing to do but write, I had 2–3 hours on a good day. And that meant focusing in and working very intensely in a way I hadn't done before. It was a challenge, but at the same time I was incredibly inspired to write for this album. I had just had a life-altering experience! I felt like my heart had been blown wide open and I was the most vulnerable and yet the strongest I had ever been... That's what "Mesmerized" and "Motherland" are about.

== Track listing ==
All songs by Heather Nova, except where noted.

1. "Welcome" (Danny Campbell, Heather Nova, Dido) – 4:18
2. "I Miss My Sky (Amelia Earhart's Last Days)" – 5:05
3. "Motherland" – 4:25
4. "Redbird" – 4:16
5. "Done Drifting" – 4:10
6. "Overturned" – 3:26
7. "Mesmerized" – 4:14
8. "Singing You Through" – 4:11
9. "A Way to Live" – 3:51
10. "Wicked Game" (Chris Isaak) – 4:51
11. "This Body" – 3:47
12. "The Sun Will Always Rise" – 4:43

== Charts ==
Chart performance for Redbird
Chart (2005)	Peak position
Austrian Albums (Ö3 Austria)	40
Belgian Albums (Ultratop Flanders)	16
Belgian Albums (Ultratop Wallonia)	63
Dutch Albums (Album Top 100)	23
French Albums (SNEP)	74
German Albums (Offizielle Top 100)	10
Swiss Albums (Schweizer Hitparade)	15
