= The Jasmine Flower =

Studio album by Heather Nova
- Released: 2008
- Genre: Indie rock

Heather Nova chronology
The Sorrowjoy (2006)	The Jasmine Flower (2008)	300 Days at Sea (2011)

The Jasmine Flower is the seventh studio album by Heather Nova, released in 2008.

== Track listing ==
All songs written and performed by Heather Nova.

1. "Ride" – 3:26
2. "Beautiful Storm" – 3:24
3. "Maybe Tomorrow" – 3:57
4. "Out on a Limb" – 3:53
5. "Every Soldier Is a Mother's Son" – 3:12
6. "Out in New Mexico" – 3:28
7. "Looking for the Light" – 2:39
8. "Hollow" – 3:11
9. "If I Should Die" – 3:16
10. "Say Something" – 3:47
11. "Follow Me in Grace" – 3:35
12. "Always Christmas" – 4:29

== Charts ==
Chart performance for The Jasmine Flower
Chart (2008)	Peak position
Austrian Albums (Ö3 Austria)	61
Dutch Albums (Album Top 100)	43
German Albums (Offizielle Top 100)	52
Swiss Albums (Schweizer Hitparade)	26
