= Joyride the Musical =

2024 musical based on Roxette songs

- Book: Guy Unsworth; Original book: Klas Abrahamsson
- Setting: England, 1994
- Basis: Got You Back, novel by Jane Fallon; Roxette discography
- Premiere: September 6, 2024: Malmö Opera
- Productions: 2024: Malmö; 2025: Stockholm; 2026: Malmö; 2027: Copenhagen; 2027: Amstetten

Joyride the Musical is a jukebox musical based on the songs by Swedish pop duo Roxette and the novel Got You Back by Jane Fallon. It premiered in 2024 at Malmö Opera.

== Plot ==
Stylist Stephanie, her boyfriend Joe and their teenage daughter Stella live in London. Joe, a veterinarian, works part time in the small town of Lincoln. One day Stephanie discovers Joe is living a double life and has another girlfriend, Katie. Katie knows about Joe's family, but believes Joe and Stephanie separated a year ago. When Stephanie and Katie find out Joe has lied to both of them, they plot a revenge but things don't turn out as they planned.

== Development ==
Malmö Opera contacted Roxette frontman and songwriter Per Gessle with the idea of creating a musical based on Roxette's music. The musical is based on Jane Fallon's novel Got You Back. It was adapted by British director Guy Unsworth, after an original book by Klas Abrahamsson. The musical adaptation and the arrangements were made by Swedish arranger/conductor Joakim Hallin. The dialogue is in Swedish (with English subtitles) and the songs performed in English.

== Performance history ==
The musical premiered at Malmö Opera on September 6, 2024. The newspaper Sydsvenskan reported on September 19 that at that time there was only one unsold ticket left. It will play at Malmö Opera until April 27, 2025. In September 2025 it will premiere at Chinateatern in Stockholm.
