= Malmö Opera =

Swedish opera house

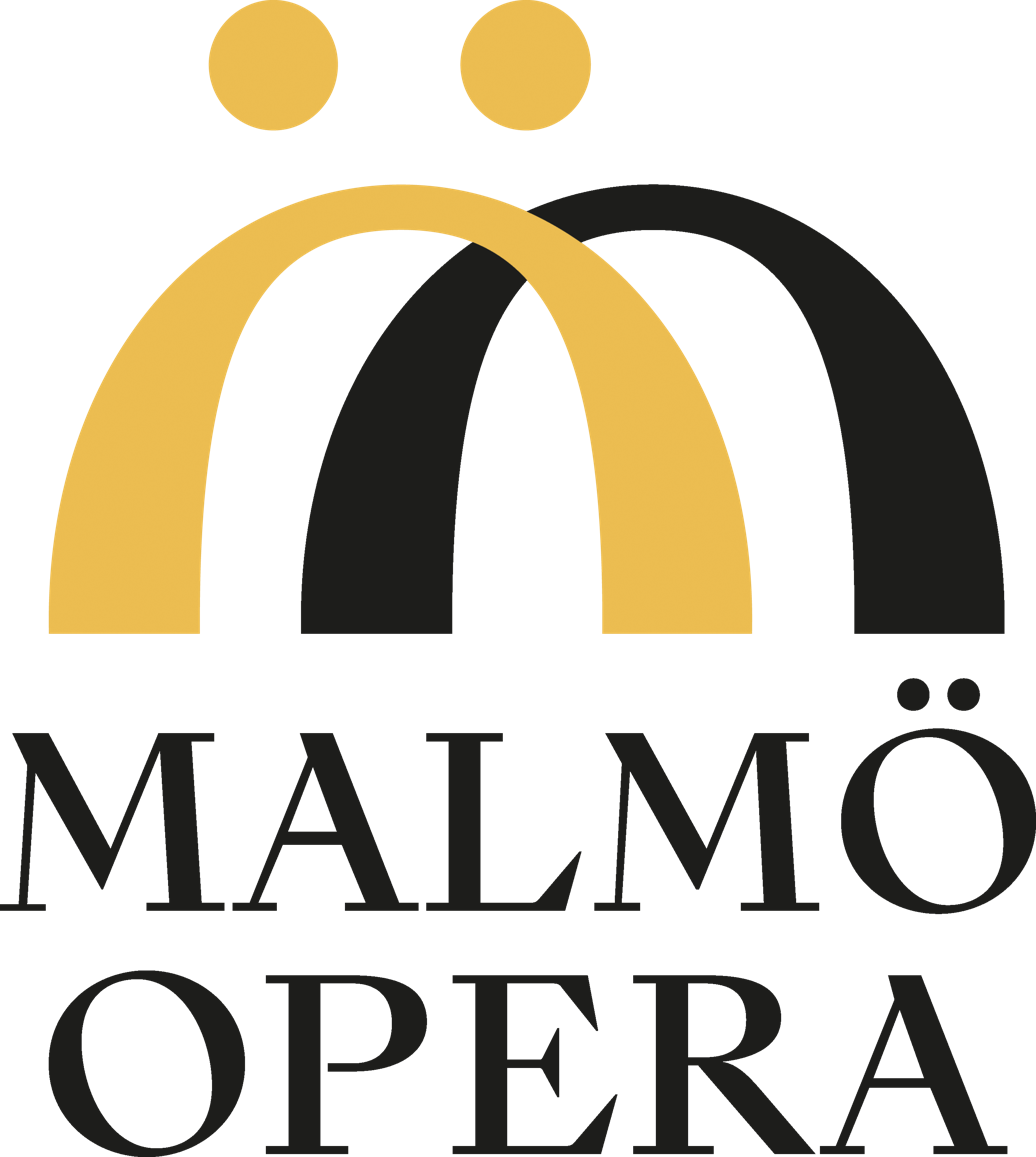

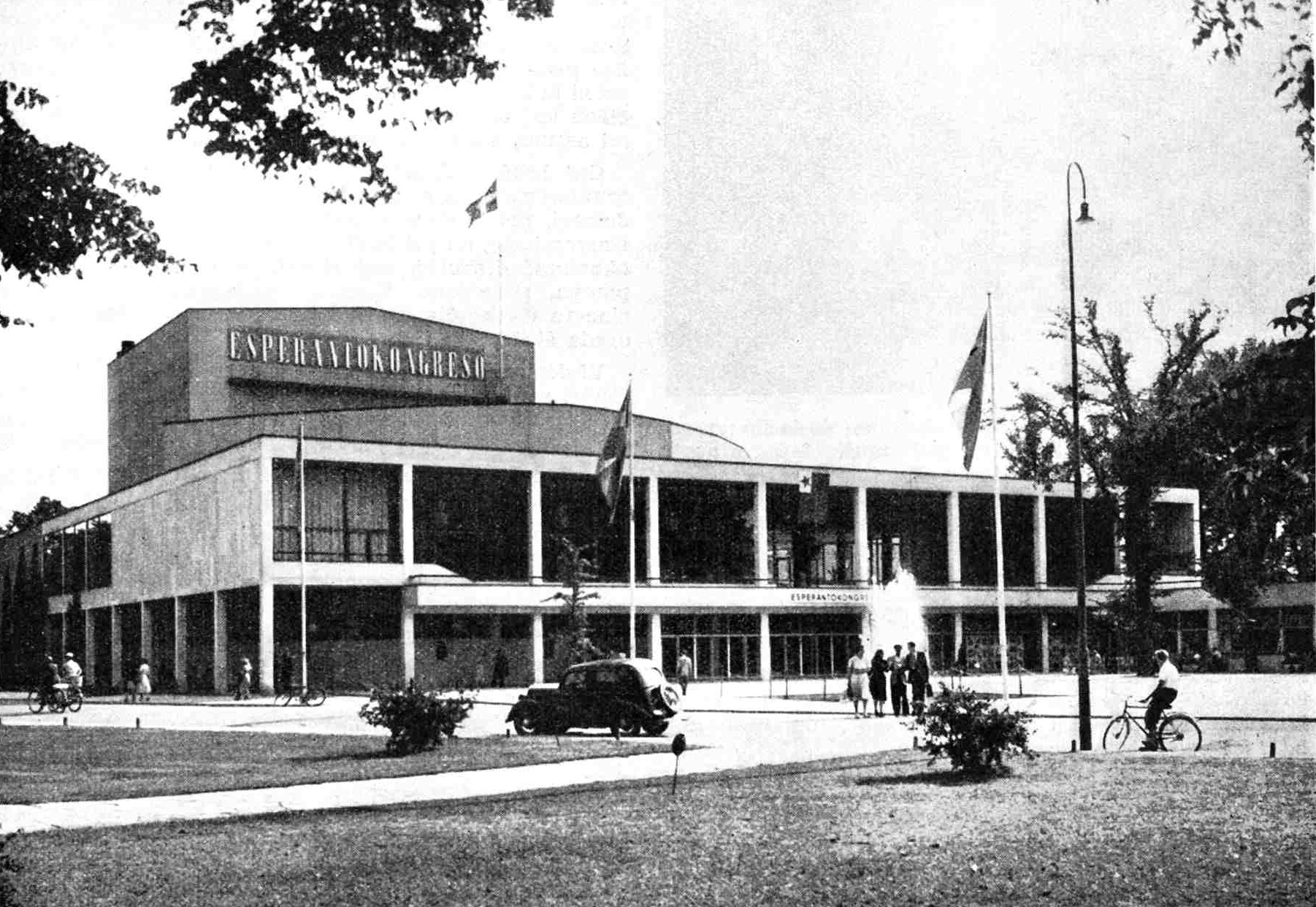
- Malmö Opera, 1948.
- Former names: Malmö Stadsteater

General information
- Architectural style: Functionalism
- Location: Östra Rönneholmsvägen 20, Malmö, Sweden
- Coordinates: 55°35′46″N 12°59′47″E
- Construction started: 1933
- Completed: 1944

Design and construction
- Architects: Sigurd Lewerentz; David Helldén; Erik Lallerstedt

Website
- Malmö Opera

Malmö Opera (Swedish: Malmö opera) is an opera house in Malmö, Sweden. An opera company of the same name presents seasons of opera in this house.

Built 1933-1944 by architect Sigurd Lewerentz and, until 1992, known as the Malmö City Theatre accommodating several different organizations, the Opera House is one of the largest auditoriums in Scandinavia with 1,511 seats, created in the form of an enclosed amphitheatre in order to allow for the greatest viewing possibility. It is used for opera, operetta, and musical performances.

== The opera building and its background as Malmö City Theater ==
Malmö's first major theater, Malmö Teater, was founded in 1808, but ceased to be used in 1938. In 1931, The Malmö City Theater Association was formed to construct a modern theater building and a city theater including spoken theater, opera, operetta and the like, ballet, pantomime and symphonic concerts. A powerful chairman and dominant municipal politician named Emil Olsson carried out the theater construction during World War II. The new theater building was designed by architects Sigurd Lewerentz, David Helldén and Erik Lallerstedt. Sigurd Lewerentz was commissioned in the 1920s to design a new theater in Malmö and proposed a building in a distinctly classical style.

However, Lewerentz's original proposal had to give way to new architectural trends in Sweden and the building was designed in the spirit of functionalism. The building was constructed from 1933 to 1944 and was inaugurated on September 23, 1944. The building was considered the most modern theater in Northern Europe. The theater building combines a functionalist division into several building volumes for different purposes with a monumental design language with classical features, in particular the grand entrance facade's marble-clad columns and large window areas. The main foyer is considered particularly beautiful, decorated with works of art by Carl Milles and Isaac Grünewald, among others.

=== Several stages ===
The building includes the Main stage, Intiman ("The Intimate") (now part of the dramatic ensemble called Malmö City Theatre) and recently also Verkstan ("The Workshop"), the home stage for the opera's children and youth activities, Operaverkstan. It also plans to introduce classic operas for its audience, and sometimes children participate in the productions. Adjacent is the theater restaurant's wing. From 1944 to the early 1990s, extensive and varied theatrical activities took place there (and on other detached stages, such as Nya Teatern; now the private theater Nöjesteatern) within the framework of the then Malmö City Theatre.

Malmö got its theater cheaply, for 6 million SEK. Malmö City Theater, built in 1944, is a monument to the dream of the popular theater and is still perceived as modern and inviting. Since December 13, 1994, the theater is a listed building.

The main stage has one of the largest auditoriums in the Nordic countries. The auditorium can accommodate a maximum of 1 511 spectators, of which ten are wheelchair spaces and ten are companion spaces. The auditorium can be reduced to four different sizes by means of retractable walls. The stage itself is one of the largest in Europe. The proscenium can be raised and lowered and can be used either as an orchestra pit - capable of accommodating around 60 musicians - as part of the auditorium or as a direct continuation of the main stage. The main stage is 25 meters deep and 25 meters high. The stage area is 600 square meters. The height of the stage opening is seven meters and the width can be varied between 15 meters and 21 meters. Influenced by German director Max Reinhardt, a large (20 meters in diameter) revolving stage was constructed.

=== Artistic decoration ===
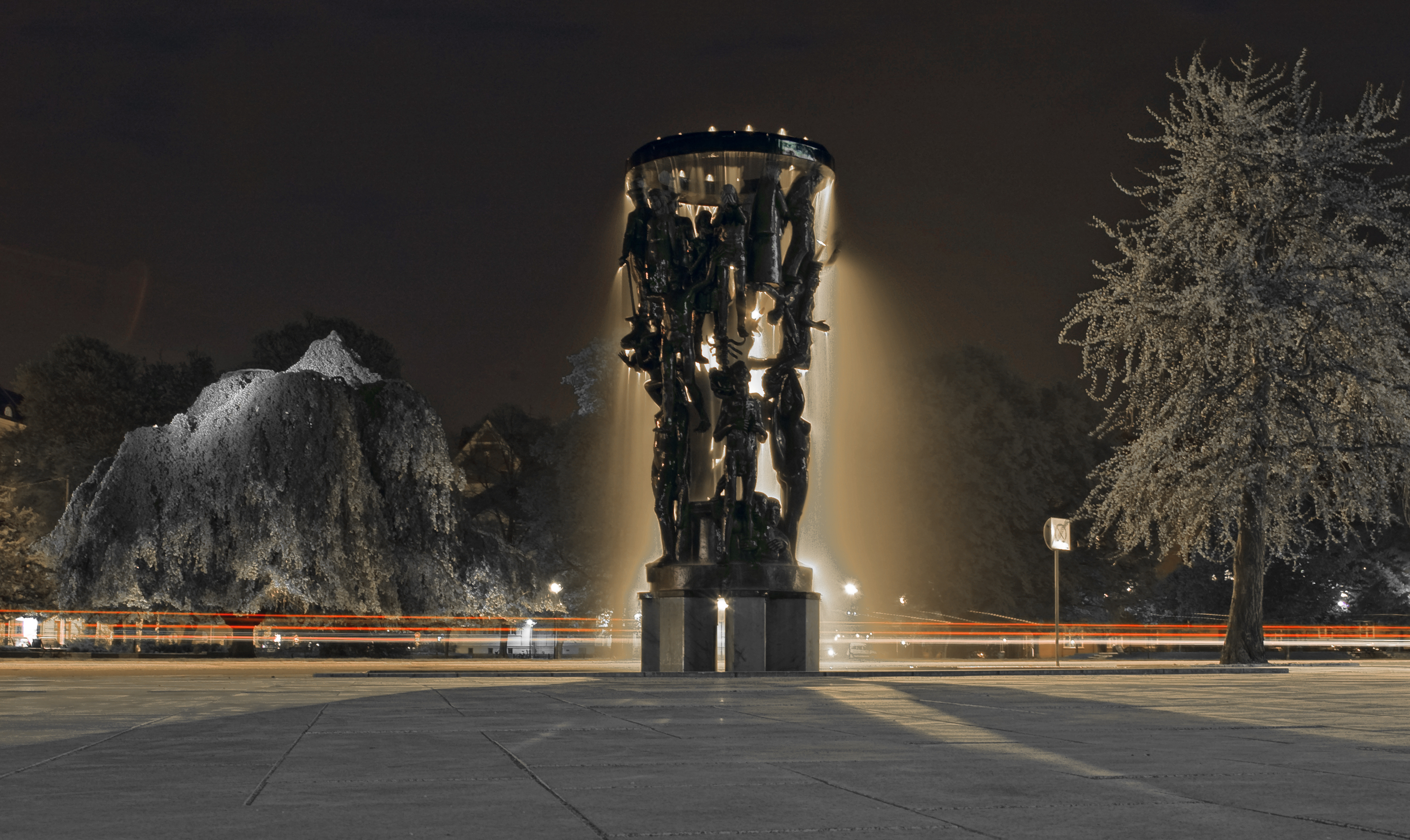
Tragos, fountain by Nils Sjögren.

The piazza outside the building is adorned with Nils Sjögren's Tragos. In the lower foyer is Bror Marklund's imposing bronze Thalia. The upper foyer contains a number of sculptures, including Carl Eldh's Young Girl (marble) and a fountain figure (plaster), Anders Jönsson's Aphrodite (bronze), Clarence Blum's The Dance Goes (bronze), Gunnar Nylund's Cavalcade (chamotte), Isaac Grünewald's Commedia dell'arte, Wäinö Aaltonen's Georg Schnéevoigt (bronze), Anders Olsson's Oscar Winge (bronze) and Carl Milles' Fanny and Selma (marble). The upper foyer is also decorated by two large oil paintings by Martin Emond with motifs taken from plays by Shakespeare.

=== Activities ===
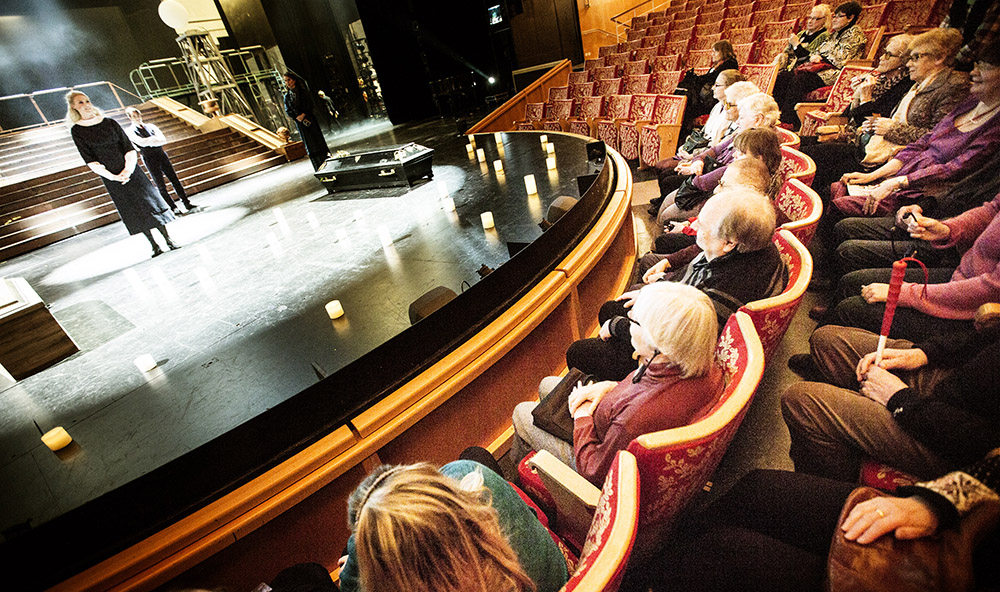
The cast of Doctor Zhivago at Malmö Opera in 2014. From the edge of the stage, they talk about characters, settings and clothes.

Many well-known performing artists and directors have worked there over the years, such as Ingmar Bergman and his famous actors (Max von Sydow, Bibi Andersson, Harriet Andersson, Gunnel Lindblom, Ingrid Thulin, Jarl Kulle, Jan Malmsjö, Lars Passgård and others), Birgit Nilsson, Sixten Ehrling, Bo Widerberg, Ernst-Hugo Järegård, Nils Poppe, Tommy Körberg, Bengt Krantz, Rickard Söderberg, Marianne Mörck, Lars Humble, Göran Stangertz, Nina Gunke, Birgitta Smiding, Karin Mang-Habashi, Philip Zandén, Lars Rudolfsson, Staffan Valdemar Holm, Peter Oskarson, Peter Stein, a host of operetta and musical artists such as Ing-Britt Stiber, Lars Ekman, Maj Lindström, Tommy Juth, Nina Pressing (including guests such as Charlotte Perelli, Sanna Nielsen, Peter Jöback, Sven-Bertil Taube, Nanne Grönvall, Petra Nielsen, Linda Olsson, Andreas Weise), dancers and opera singers from all over the world.

Until the opening of Malmö Concert Hall in 1985, the main stage also served as a concert hall once a week for the Malmö Symphony Orchestra with classical concerts, in addition to the orchestra also serving as the city theater's theater orchestra for opera, operetta, musical and ballet. On the main stage, Swedish Television has also organized events such as the 1988, 1991 1995, 1998 and 2001 Melodifestivalen.

=== Malmö Ballet 1944-1995 ===
Already from the theater's opening in 1944, there was its own ballet company, Malmöbaletten, as part of the business with Carl-Gustaf Kruuse af Verchou as its first director and ballet master, including his wife Inga Berggren as a soloist mixed with trained dancers and former entertainment dancers from Hippodromen. An internal ballet school was therefore started to raise the quality and in 1961 it was supplemented with Malmö City Theatre's Ballet School for children and young aspiring dancers, who often also came to participate in the theater's performances.

Gradually, the ballet took its place as a quality ballet ensemble, performing annually well-known classical ballets as well as original works (including Skymningslekar, 1954, created by Kruuse and Ingmar Bergman, with music by Ingvar Wieslander; Simson och Delila, 1964, by Rune Lindström and Erland von Koch; Elvira Madigan, 1977, by Conny Borg and Michael Smith; and Johannesnatten, 1981, by Gunnar de Frumerie, with new choreography by Elsa-Marianne von Rosen) and works in the direction of modern dance. In addition, dancers often participated in other theater productions, opera, operetta, musicals and exceptionally some spoken theater productions. In the major restructuring of the theater, the ballet was closed down and replaced by the independent Skånes dansteater with only modern dance in 1995.

Directors (and often choreographers and dancers) of the Malmö Ballet were Carl-Gustaf Kruuse af Verchou (1944-1962), Holger Reenberg (1962-1967), Teddy Rhodin (1967-1970), Stella Claire (acting 1970-1971), Conny Borg (1971-1980), Elsa-Marianne von Rosen (1980-1987) and Jonas Kåge (1987-1995).

== The restructuring ==
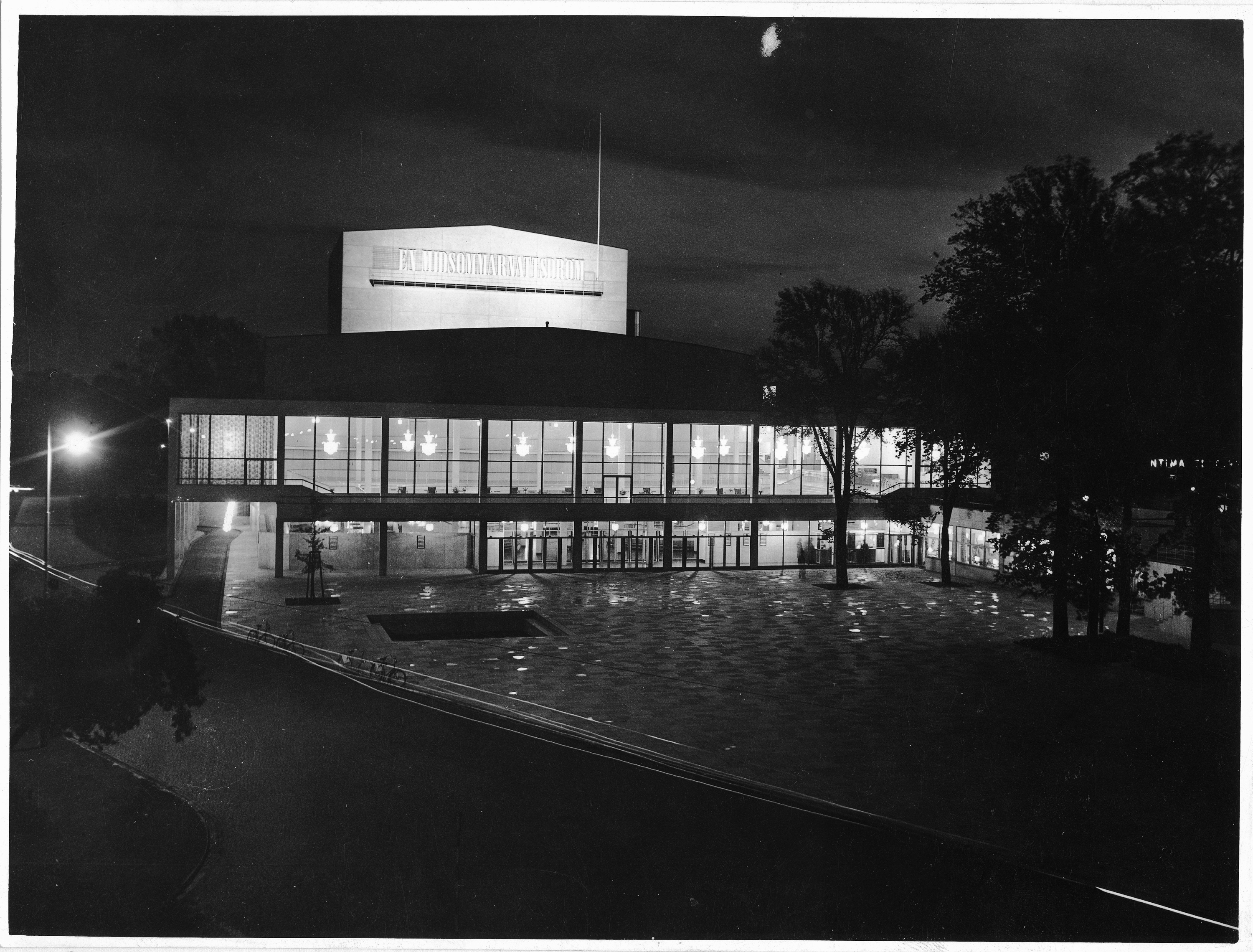
Malmö Opera, (then Malmö Stadsteater), 1962.

In the early 1990s, a major restructuring of operations began, when the organization Malmö City Theatre was dissolved and replaced by a group with separate companies for speech theater (Malmö Dramatic Theater, since 2008 again under the new name Malmö City Theatre), opera and musical drama (Malmö Opera and Music Theater, now Malmö Opera), modern dance (Skånes Dansteater; replaced the former ballet activities) and Malmö Symphony Orchestra MSO in Malmö Concert Hall (replaced for the scenic activities by the newly formed Malmö Opera Orchestra), and later these became independent companies with the City of Malmö and Region Skåne (Scania Region) as owners. In 1990, the economic association was transformed into Aktiebolaget Malmö City Theatre, which in 1993 became Malmö Musik och Teater AB, which from 2002 was renamed Malmö Opera och Musikteater AB and later just Malmö Opera.

== Current Malmö Opera activities ==
Malmö Opera performances feature operas and musicals, both newly written Swedish works and classic works. The venue also hosts themed concerts, gala evenings, and guest performances on occasion. The Malmö Opera employs professional directors, set designers, singers, librettists and conductors who work together as a team to better support the performances in the venue. The first director of the Opera was Lars Rudolfsson, who directed the initial production at the Opera, Benjamin Britten's A Midsummer Night's Dream.

The Opera has also distinguished itself with a number of new Swedish or foreign operas and modernized interpretations of older or lesser-known works, (for example, Peter Oskarson's production of Verdi's Rigoletto (1994) with Loa Falkman and Dilber Yunus received great attention) in addition to some crowd-pleasing musicals such as m Dåliga Mänskor ("Bad People"), Jesus Christ Superstar, Les Misérables, Singin' in the Rain, in addition to earlier successes such as Ingmar Bergman's The Merry Widow (1954), The Long Ships (1978), La Cage aux Folles (1985) and a large number of operettas (several with Nils Poppe), as Malmö was long known as the "city of operettas". In 2006-2011, composer Jonas Forssell was attached to the Opera as "house composer" with three commissioned operas, Träskoprinsessan (2006), Death and the Maiden (2007) and Hemligheter (2011) in which the role of Swedenborg was specially written for baritone Bengt Krantz. In addition to the 2010s, the family opera The Snow Queen after Hans Christian Andersen's fairy tale was also commissioned. Andersen's fairy tale by composer Benjamin Staern and librettist Anelia Kadieva Jonsson, which was a great success with audiences in 2016 and 2018. In 2024, the Roxette jukebox musical Joyride the Musical, premiered at Malmö Opera.

=== Malmö Opera Orchestra ===
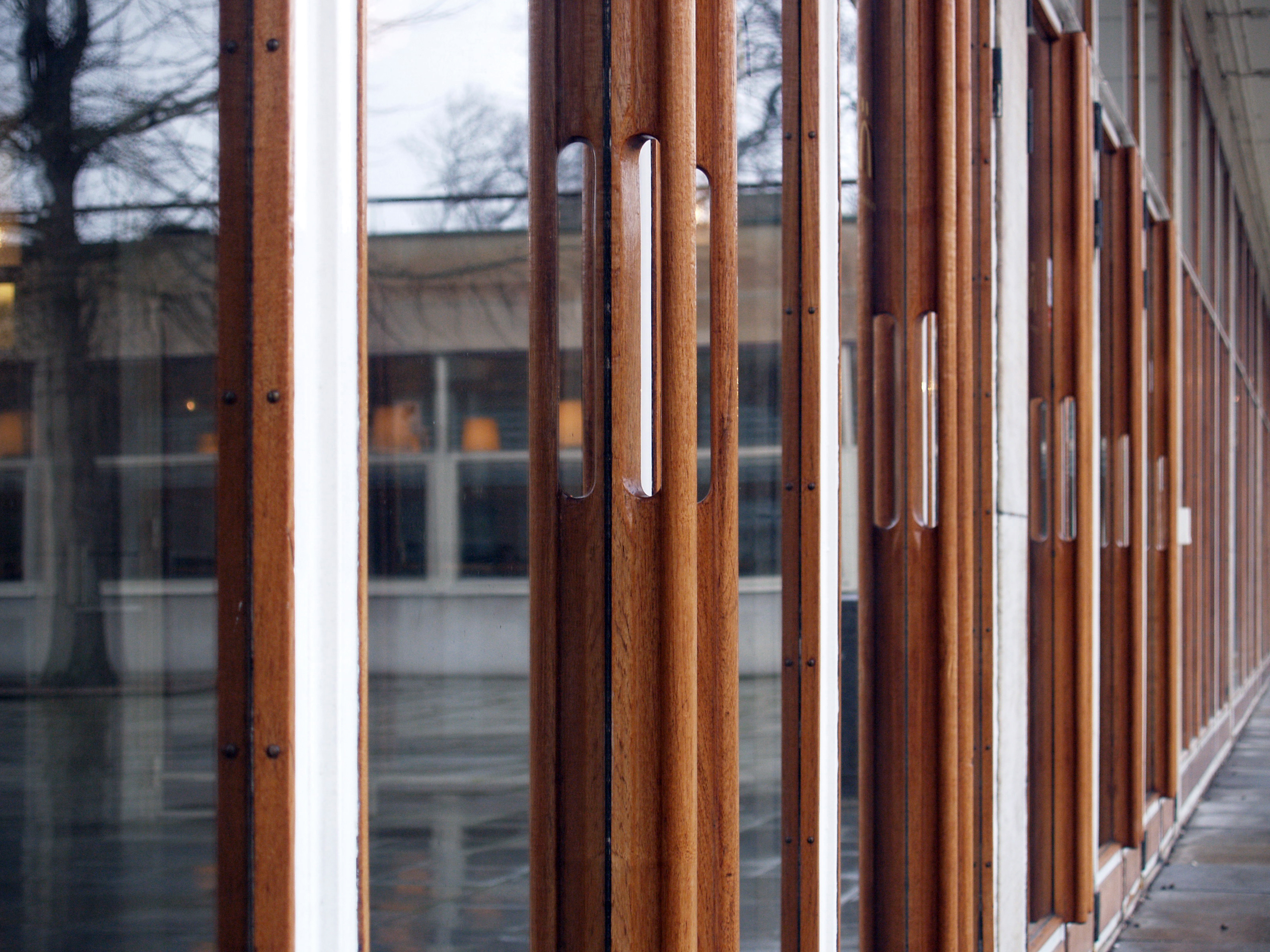
Front doors, Malmö Opera.

The Malmö Opera Orchestra was founded in 1991. Today the orchestra consists of about 60 musicians. The orchestra plays everything from chamber music, opera for children, concerts, musicals to major operas. The orchestra has made several recordings. In June 2016, a new extension was inaugurated with a large orchestra hall, rehearsal rooms, etc. for the orchestra's activities and also music recordings.

=== Malmö Opera Choir ===
Malmö Opera has its own opera choir consisting of 36 people. The choir was led by choirmaster Sofia Söderberg Eberhard and from 2010 by Elisabeth Boström until 2019, then by Elena Mitrevska. The tasks are very varied and include opera, musicals and concerts of various kinds. Members of both the women's and men's choirs often perform soloist roles in the theater's productions.

=== The Opera Workshop ===
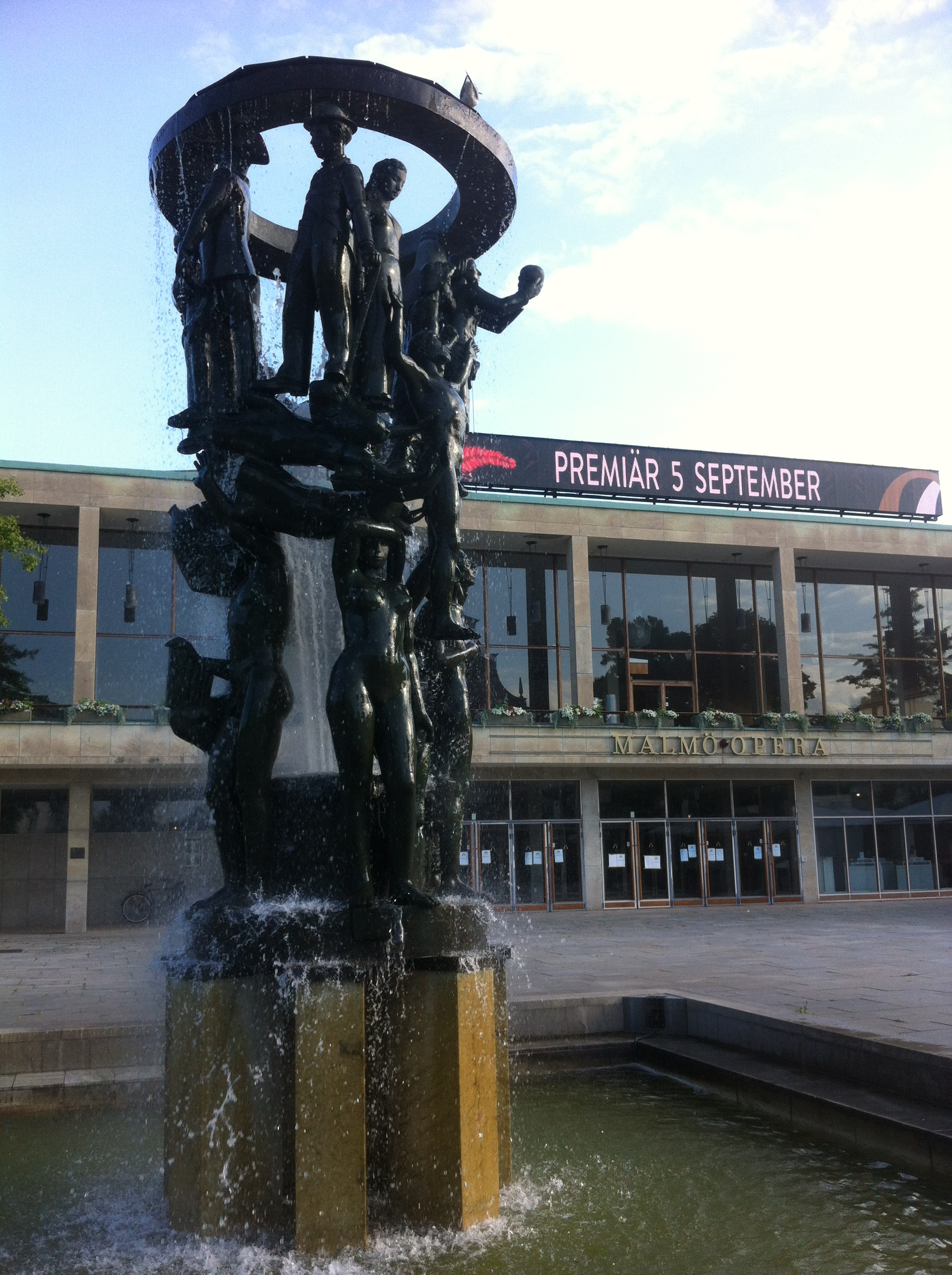
Tragos by Nils Sjögren and piazza.

Since 2002, Malmö Opera has been working to introduce children and young people to opera in a new way, when it started a special, award-winning production of musical drama for children and young people. The Opera Workshop was started as a project after a donation from Sparbanksstiftelsen Skåne and became permanent four years later with The Workshop as its own home stage.

Newly written opera drama, experimental opera and loving reinterpretations of classics are performed there with children both on stage and in the audience. Together, they have created an artistic workshop with words, sounds, images, song and rhythm, where children and young people, their teachers and other adults discover together all the possibilities of music. The Opera Workshop collaborates extensively with independent theater groups, schools, cultural schools and other institutions and produces several performances each year. Interactivity plays a central role, and many of its productions feature children and young people alongside professional artists. Its stated aim is to strengthen children's and young people's joy of life and faith in the future, and to offer them new experiences to take with them in life.

Director and librettist Maria Sundqvist has been the artistic director of Operaverkstan since its inception. Under her leadership, Operaverkstan has become a leading producer of performing arts for children and young people. This has been rewarded with positive feedback from young people, glowing reviews and several major awards, such as Region Skåne's Special Cultural Award 2010.

== Artistic directors ==
Artistic directors of Malmö Opera in the early years included Philip Zandén and Lars Rudolfsson. In December 2009, Bengt Hall took over as Artistic Director after Lars Tibell and Göran K Johansson left. In the summer of 2017, Danish composer, music educator and conductor Michael Bojesen took over the directorship, later stepping down on 19 April 2022. As of November 2023, Christina Hörnell holds this position.

== Renovation in 1973 and 2004 ==
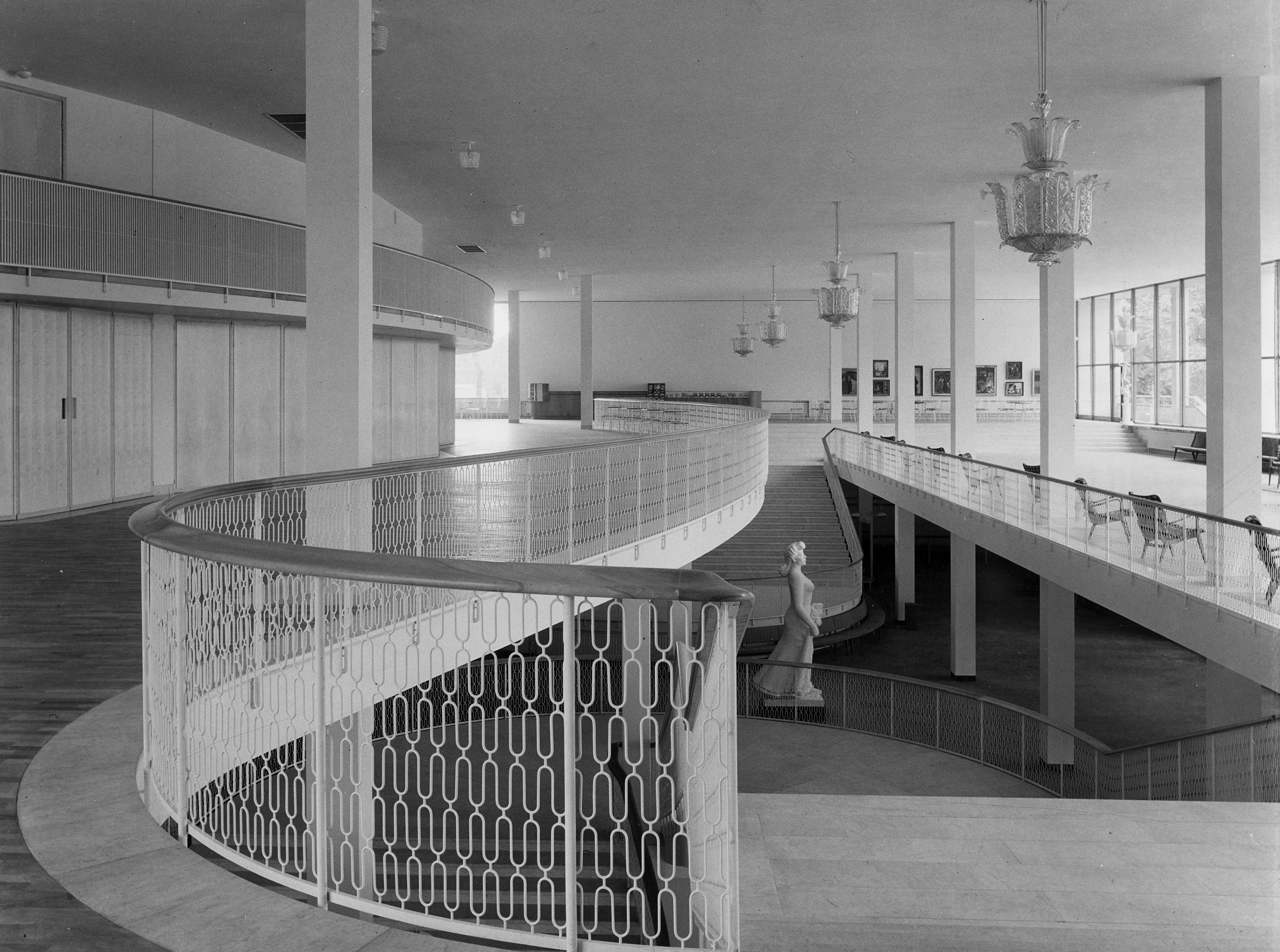
Malmö Opera interior, 1962.

When it opened in 1944, Malmö City Theatre was at the cutting edge of modern technology. After only a short while, it was suddenly outdated. As early as 1973, three new control rooms were built in the main theater, sacrificing 63 seats on the parquet. New lighting systems were installed for both the Intiman and the Main Stage. Larger workshops were also required, plus a decoration warehouse in the theater building.

Improving the acoustics of the Main Stage was a very complicated process as the auditorium could be converted into four different sizes. Things became less crowded when, in 1973, the financial administration could be housed in offices nearby. At that time, the old Åberg School was also taken over, which after renovation is called the Yellow Pavilion and houses rehearsal rooms, set design rooms, costume studios, archives, etc.

All the while, the renovation program was replenished. Finally, the theater was closed for eight months in 1986-1987 when it played in various temporary premises, including a hot air tent. When the theatre reopened in February 1987, the chairman of the board, Curt Åke Olsson, was able to note that both Storan and Intiman had received new armchairs, that the revolving stage had been modernized, new ventilation had been installed and the orchestra pit had been expanded. All this at a cost of around SEK 20 million.

Malmö Opera was renovated again in 2004, when the performances were moved to Båghallarna in Västra hamnen (now the home stage of Skånes Dansteater). The theater was reopened again in February 2006.

== Friendship and awards ==
An independent association of friends of the opera, Malmö Operas Vänner, is linked to the opera's activities.

The Friends of Malmö Opera was formed as a non-profit organization in 2000 with the aim of safeguarding the interests of the audience, supporting Malmö Opera's activities and promoting its development. The aim of the Friends is to help preserve and strengthen Malmö Opera's position in Malmö and the surrounding region. The association aims to promote interest in qualified musical drama through cultural activities.

From the financial surplus of the association's activities, scholarships and supporting grants are awarded annually.

== Bibliography ==
- Sjögren, Henrik (1994). Konst och Nöje Malmö Stadsteater 1944-1994 (in Swedish). Höganäs: Bra Böcker. ISBN 9171197036.

== Other Swedish Opera Houses ==
- Royal Swedish Opera
- Gothenburg opera house
- NorrlandsOperan
- Drottningholm Palace Theatre
