= Heather Nova =

Bermudian singer-songwriter (born 1967)

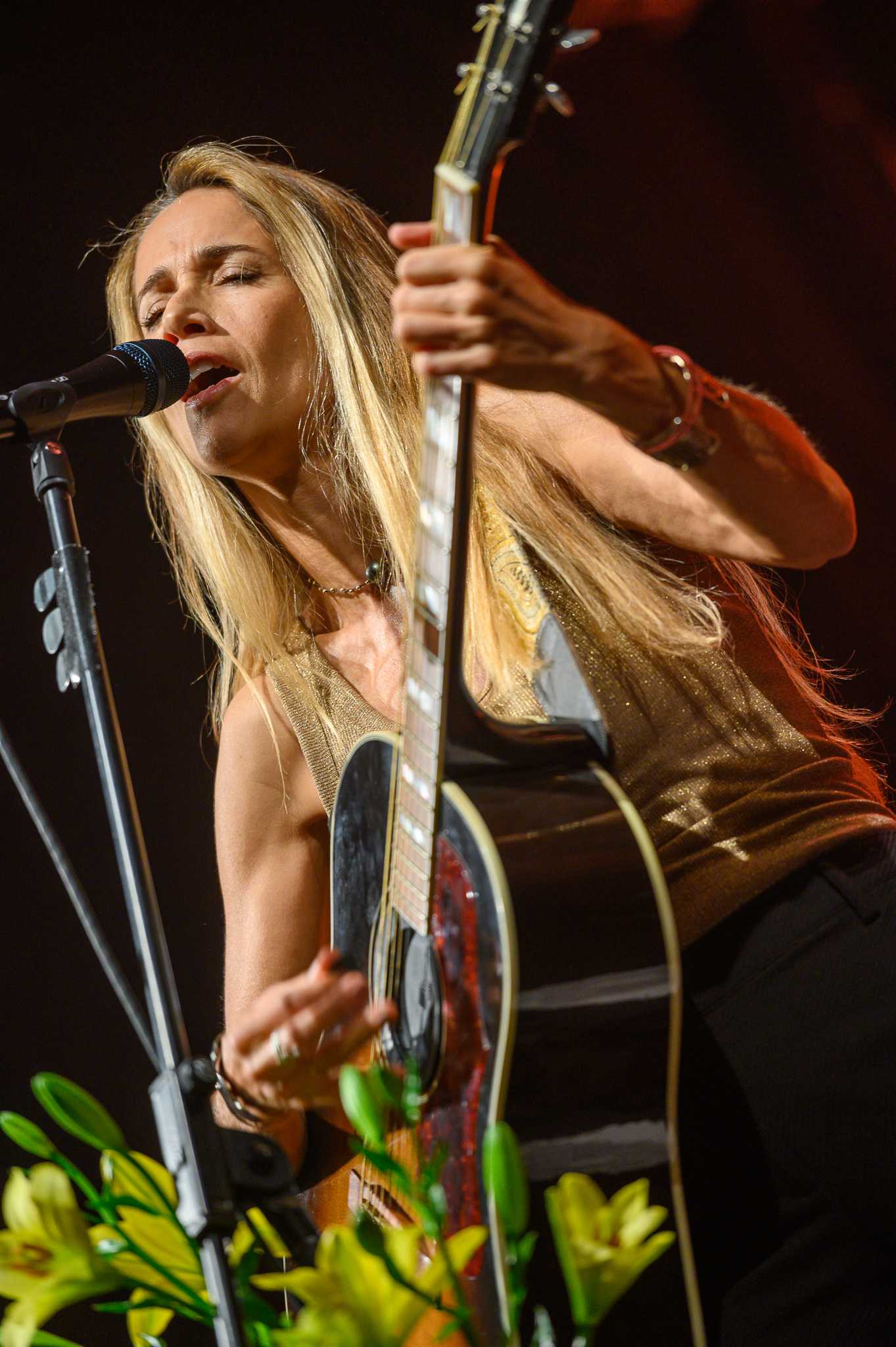
- Nova performing in 2019

Background information
- Born: Heather Allison Frith; 6 July 1967 (age 59); Bermuda
- Genres: Alternative rock; folk rock; alternative pop
- Occupation: Singer-songwriter
- Instruments: Vocals; guitar
- Years active: 1990–present
- Labels: Big Cat; WORK; V2
- Website: www.heathernova.com

Heather Nova (born Heather Allison Frith; 6 July 1967) is a Bermudian singer-songwriter. Born in Bermuda to a Canadian mother and Bermudian father, she spent most of her childhood aboard a sailboat, sailing throughout the Atlantic. As a teenager, she relocated to the United States, where she attended the Rhode Island School of Design, earning a degree in film in 1989.

In 1990, after a stint residing in New York City, she relocated to London and began writing and performing music, releasing her first EP that year on the British independent label Big Cat Records. After releasing the studio albums Glow Stars (1993) and Oyster (1994), she found mainstream recognition with her third record, Siren (1998), which charted on the Billboard 200 after two of its tracks were featured on the popular American television series Felicity and Dawson's Creek.

Nova followed this with the albums South (2001), Storm (2003), and Redbird (2005). In 2006, she released The Sorrowjoy, a poetry album. Her subsequent albums include The Jasmine Flower (2008), 300 Days at Sea (2011), The Way It Feels (2015), and Pearl (2019).

== Early life ==
Heather Nova was born Heather Allison Frith on Bermuda, a British overseas territory. Her mother is a native of Nova Scotia, Canada, and her father is a native of Bermuda. Nova spent most of her childhood with her family, including one sister, television reporter and fashion model Susannah, and one brother, reggae singer Mishka, on a 42-foot-long (13 m) sailboat (named Moon) built by her father, where the Friths spent most of the 1970s and part of the 1980s, sailing throughout the Atlantic and Caribbean waters and coasts. Nova started playing guitar and violin as a child.

She relocated to the United States as a teenager and graduated from The Putney School in Vermont in 1983 before enrolling at the Rhode Island School of Design (RISD), where she earned a degree in film in 1989. While attending RISD, she also composed and recorded the music for her student films.

== Career ==
After graduating from RISD, Nova relocated to New York City to pursue a music career. She recorded several demos which she sent to Columbia Records. In retrospect, she commented: "I had no idea how the music industry worked at all." She subsequently moved to London, where she already held British citizenship due to her Bermudian origins. In London, she worked in a Bermuda tourism office and began performing in local pubs in the evenings.

In 1990, she released her first recording, These Walls, an EP, as Heather Frith. The new name debuted in 1993 with her second EP titled Spirit in You and her first full album, the critically acclaimed Glow Stars, produced by Felix Tod, after being discovered by Big Cat label manager Steven Abbott. The success of the album led her to record and release her first live album Blow the same year.

In 1994, she released Oyster, her breakout album that was produced by Youth and Felix Tod and began almost two years of touring. Another live album, Live from the Milky Way, was released in 1995. Siren, the follow-up to Oyster because of the single "London Rain", was released in 1998, after which she joined Sarah McLachlan and others on the North American Lilith Fair, a music festival with only female performers. After the release of Siren and a world tour to promote the record, Nova took a break while various television show and film soundtracks licensed some of her songs and her record company (Sony Records/The WORK Group) released various singles from the album, which received only moderate play on America's MTV2, Europe's MTV and Canada's MuchMusic and on mainstream radio, although she was popular on college radio. Also during this time, she recorded a version of the often covered traditional song "Gloomy Sunday", for the German WWII feature film drama Ein Lied von Liebe und Tod (released under the international title, Gloomy Sunday). In 2000, Nova released yet another live album titled Wonderlust.

Over the years, Nova has written and recorded over 120 songs. With the release of South (2001), she returned to the international spotlight with an appearance on the soundtrack of the John Cusack movie Serendipity. She also appeared on the soundtracks to the Sean Penn film, I Am Sam; The Crow: City of Angels; and The Craft. A collaboration with Swedish indiepop band Eskobar, for a song called "Someone New", led to its music video being played primarily on America's MTV. Storm, Nova's fifth studio album, recorded with Mercury Rev as her backing band, was released in late 2003 on her own Saltwater label, went top 5 in Germany, followed by a tour during which Nova became pregnant. She quickly followed the birth of her son with her next record Redbird, released in 2005, again Top 10 in Germany.

In December 2005, Nova released Together As One, an EP supporting the Bermuda Sloop Foundation which operates the Bermuda sloop Spirit of Bermuda. In 2002, she self-published The Sorrowjoy, a 72-page book of her poetry and drawings. An album of the same name was unofficially released in March 2006, which featured Nova reading the poems from her book set to ambient music. She also collaborated with the German trance artist ATB on tracks like "Love Will Find You", "Feel You Like a River" and the international hit "Renegade". In 2008, she released an album called The Jasmine Flower, a solar powered acoustic album recorded in Bermuda, before touring as an acoustic tour.

In late 2010 she embarked on another European tour promoting her The Jasmine Flower album. On this tour, she played four unreleased songs ("Save a Little Piece of Tomorrow", "Everything Changes", "Burning to Love", and "Turn the Compass Round") that are included on her album, 300 Days at Sea, produced by Felix Tod. This full-band album was released on 27 May 2011. In late 2014, she began working on studio album called The Way It Feels which was released in May 2015. Her tenth album, Pearl, was released on 28 June 2019.

On 26 August 2022, Nova released her album Other Shores, which consists of cover songs.

On 21 February 2025, her latest album Breath and Air was released.

== Personal life ==
Nova was married to Felix Tod from 1996 to 2014. They have one son, Sebastian, born in 2004.

== Discography ==
=== Studio albums ===
List of studio albums, with selected chart positions
Title	Year	Peak chart positions									
Title	Year	UK	AUS	AUT	BEL (FL)	FRA	GER	NLD	NZ	SWI	US
Glow Stars	1993	—	—	—	—	—	—	—	—	—	—
Oyster	1994	72	78	—	33	—	43	70	23	33	179
Siren	1998	55	90	24	16	60	13	48	18	28	176
South	2001	—	—	35	17	54	5	35	—	21	—
Storm	2003	—	—	18	9	45	5	22	—	12	—
Redbird	2005	—	—	40	16	74	10	23	—	15	—
The Jasmine Flower	2008	—	—	61	—	—	52	43	—	26	—
300 Days at Sea	2011	—	—	48	42	—	25	38	—	47	—
The Way It Feels	2015	—	—	—	34	—	64	25	—	—	—
Pearl	2019	—	—	—	32	—	21	24	—	57	—
Other Shores	2022	—	—	—	109	—	20	—	—	34	—
Breath and Air	2025	—	—	—	76	—	18	—	—	55	—
The Orchard	2026	—	—	—	25	—	37	—	—	41	—

=== Poetry albums ===
- The Sorrowjoy (2006)

=== Live albums ===
- Blow (1993)
- Live from the Milky Way EP (1995)
- Wonderlust (2000)
- Live in Europe (2026)

=== EPs ===
- These Walls (1990)
- Spirit in You (1993)
- Live from the Milky Way (1995)
- The First Recording (1997) – Heather Frith reissue
- Together as One (2005)
- Higher Ground (2011)

=== Singles ===
Title	Year	Peak chart positions									Album
Title	Year	UK	AUS	CAN	GER	NLD	NZ	SWE	US Mod. Rock	US Adult Pop	Album
"Walk This World"	1994	69	28	—	91	—	19	—	13	—	Oyster
"Maybe an Angel"	1995	91	125	—	—	—	—	—	—	—	Oyster
"Truth and Bone"	1996	—	122	—	—	—	—	—	—	—	Oyster
"London Rain (Nothing Heals Me Like You Do)"	1998	87	142	10	—	—	—	—	—	31	Siren
"Heart & Shoulder"	1999	76	145	49	—	—	—	—	—	—	Siren
"I'm the Girl"	1999	—	—	—	—	—	—	—	—	—	Siren
"Gloomy Sunday"	1999	—	—	—	—	—	—	—	—	—	Ein Lied von Liebe und Tod Soundtrack
"I'm No Angel"	2001	89	—	—	92	94	—	—	—	—	South
"Virus of the Mind"	2002	—	—	—	—	84	—	—	—	—	South
"Someone New" (with Eskobar)	2002	—	—	—	—	88	—	14	—	—	There's Only Now (by Eskobar)
"River of Life"	2003	—	—	—	89	—	—	—	—	—	Storm
"Renegade" (with ATB)	2007	—	—	—	38	—	—	—	—	—	Trilogy (by ATB)
"—" denotes releases that did not chart or were not released.

=== DVD ===
- 2004: Live at the Union Chapel

== Book ==
- The Sorrowjoy, ISBN 0-9542115-0-2

== Sources ==
- Duerden, Nick (2003). Buckley, Peter (ed.). The Rough Guide to Rock. London: Rough Guides. ISBN 1-85828-457-0.
- Larkin, Colin, ed. (2000). The Virgin Encyclopedia of Nineties Music. London: Virgin Books. ISBN 0-7535-0427-8.
