= Eskobar =

Swedish band

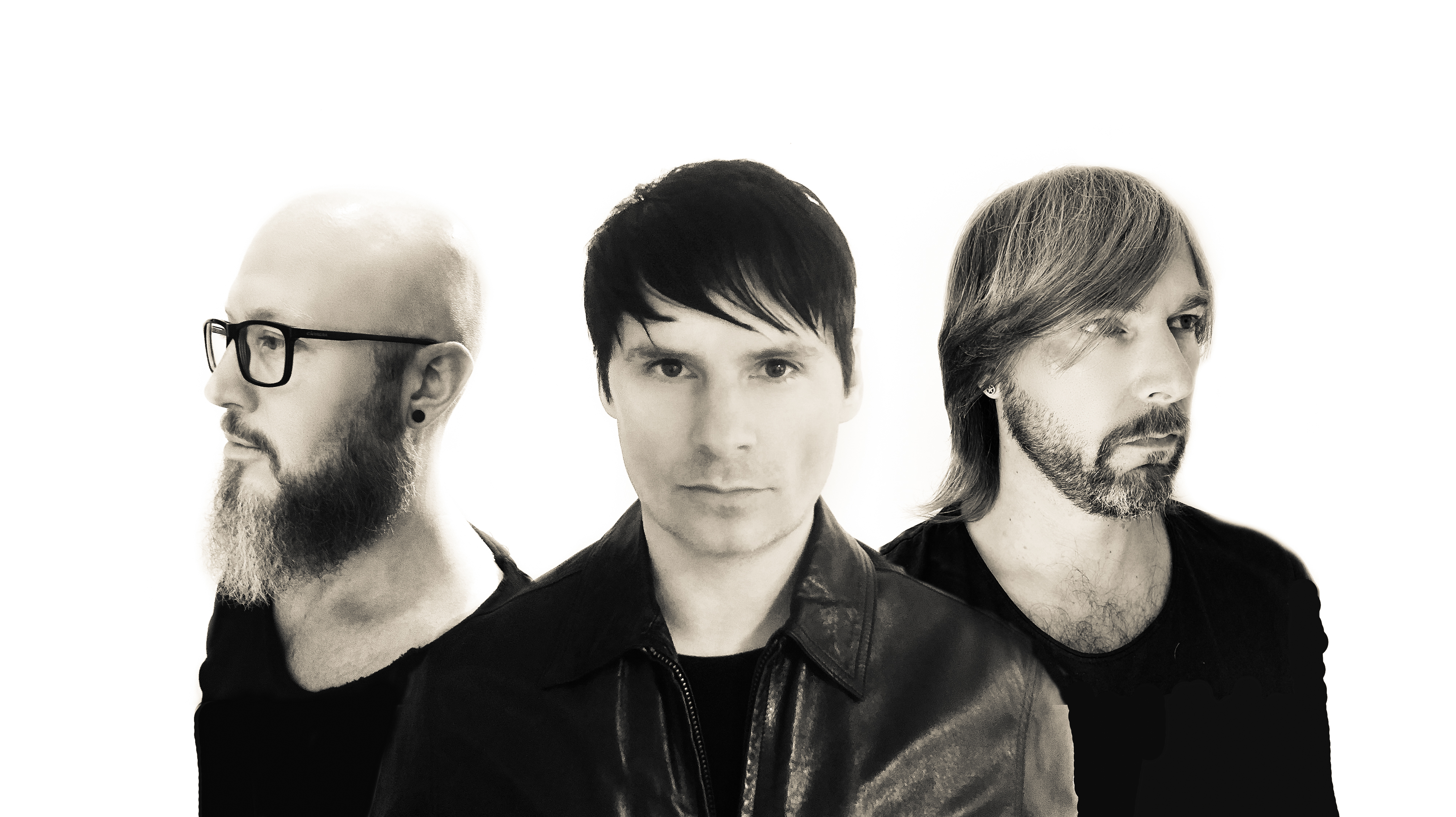
- Eskobar in 2019

Background information
- Origin: Åkersberga, Sweden
- Genres: Northie, Indie, alternative, rock
- Years active: 1996–present
- Labels: V2, Gibulchi
- Members: Daniel Bellqvist; Frederik Zäll; Jocke Brunnberg
- Past members: Robert Birming

Eskobar is a Swedish Northie (Northern Indie) / indie / pop band that was founded in 1996 in the small town of Åkersberga, north of Stockholm. The band members are Daniel Bellqvist (lead vocals), Frederik Zäll (guitar), and Jocke Brunnberg (drums).

== History ==
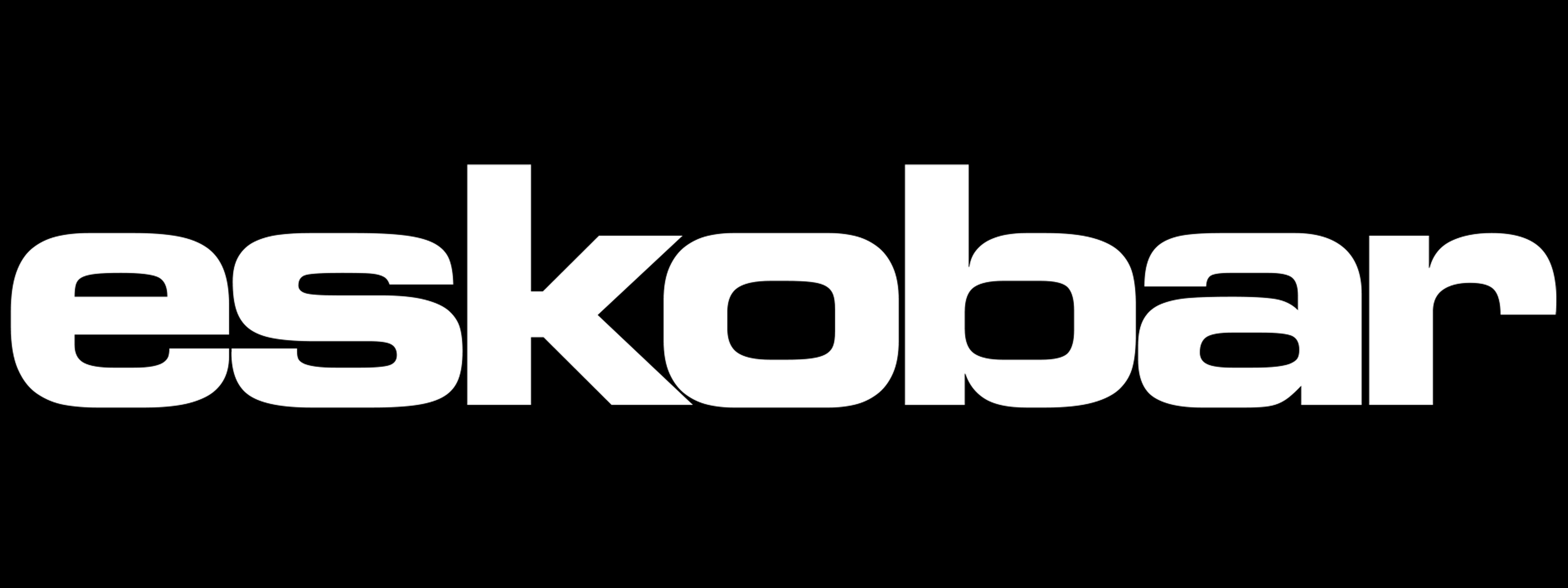
Eskobar Logo

=== Formation ===
Eskobar has its roots in the early 1990s when Daniel Bellqvist left his band to join Frederik Zäll’s band called FOF (an acronym for "Fish Or Fantasy?") in 1994. The two musicians had previously met in their high school band class. In their incarnation as FOF, Daniel played bass while Frederik played guitar, and since Grunge was the popular musical style of the time, the band settled on this genre as their signature style. During this time the band also changed its name to Cripplefish.

In less than a year, Cripplefish's sound began to evolve from Grunge into Pop, prompting the lead singer, Staffan Atling, to leave the band. This shift in genre style led to a significant reformulation of the band. Cripplefish was renamed, this time taking the name The Bugs, but without a lead singer, Daniel was forced to pick up the slack on vocals while playing bass. Another reshuffling of the band's lineup brought in Robert Birming as drummer and Jojjo, the band’s only female member, was brought on as The Bugs' acoustic guitarist and backup vocalist.

By 1996, the newly revised 4-piece band had continued to make inroads with their upbeat pop style, but another shakeup was looming on the horizon. As they booked their first Stockholm gig, Jojjo decided to leave The Bugs, citing the stresses associated with daily rehearsals as her main motivation for leaving the band. The three remaining band members decided to stay on and continue making music, however, and used Jojjo’s departure and their ever-evolving style to change the band’s name yet again. The Bugs' shift from mainstream pop to Brit-Pop came about as they changed their name to Browneyed Susan.

=== Members ===
Daniel Bellqvist – Vocals, Percussion

Frederik Zäll – Guitars, Pianos, Harmonica etc.

Jocke Brunnberg – Drums

Jocke, a childhood friend of the band's members, began playing with Eskobar in 2015 and joined as a full member in 2018. He has been active as a drummer across numerous bands and projects.

=== Getting signed ===
After a year floundering with Swedish record label MNW, the band recorded a three track demo in 1998 that was shuffled from EMI to Sony Publishing, where Sony eventually agreed to finance a ten-song demo. This critical step would become a watershed moment for them, as one of the ten songs – "Tumbling Down" (not to be confused with the country/western song Tumbling Tumbleweeds) – was set apart, in sonic feel, from the others, in demonstrating a capability for originality, breaking from the uniform style of the band's entire previous corpus, for the first time in its history. They discarded other nine songs In favor of a new, more free-flowing set of numbers; this demo led to them signing with V2 Music, where they used the name Small Change.

Under its new label, the band found greater exposure, opening for such well-known Swedish bands as The Wannadies. Eventually, their popularity brought them to a prime position for releasing their own album, but for on its title. Shuffling through a series of names had seemed fine for an unsigned band, but they committed to settling on a single name, not in use by other bands. After substantial and frustrating thought, and nearly giving up on the task, a friend of the band who met an American manager who (being asked for help), suggested the surname of the notorious drug czar Pablo Escobar; the band liked the sound of it (but made a slight spelling change from the letter 'c' to 'k', for the sake of a distinctive spelling.

=== Fame ===
"Someone New", a duet with Heather Nova released in 2002, was an international hit and has since taken on a life of its own. Although both artists are still primarily known in Europe, the popularity of "Someone New" saw Eskobar and Heather Nova's fan base reach America through MTV.

The band has been nominated for the Grammy award, Song Of The Year with their Heather Nova-duette ”Someone New”, won ”Best Nordic Act” on MTV Awards and a number of other nominations and awards in Sweden but predominantly in Europe.

== Melodifestivalen 2008 ==
On January 15, it was announced that Eskobar will be one of the participants in Melodifestivalen 2008, the Swedish selection for the Eurovision Song Contest. They were among the last artists - the "wildcards" - to be confirmed and competed in the third heat in Linköping on February 23. The title of the song is "Hallelujah New World". Eskobar did not manage to qualify for the Melodifestivalen final, placing last in their heat and becoming the first wild card entry not to qualify at least for the second chance round.

== Discography ==
=== Albums ===
- 'Til We're Dead (2000)
- There's Only Now (2001)
- A Thousand Last Chances (2004)
- Eskobar (2006)
- Death in Athens (2008)
- Live (2015)
- Magnetic (2016)
- Chapter 2 (2020)

=== Singles ===
- On a Train (1999)
- Good Day for Dying (2000)
- Tumbling Down (2000)
- Counterfeit EP (2000)
- Tumbling Down (Dead Mono Version) (2001)
- Into Space (2001)
- Tell Me I'm Wrong (2001)
- Someone New (2002)
- On the Ground (2002)
- Move On (2002)
- Love Strikes (2003) (#93 Switzerland)
- Bring the Action (2004)
- You Got Me (2004) (#29 France)
- Even If You Know Me (2005)
- Persona Gone Missing (2006)
- Devil Keeps Me Moving (2006)
- Whatever This Town (2006)
- As the World Turns (2008)
- Hallelujah New World (2008)
- Untrap Yourself (2014)
- The Starlight EP (2015)
- You're My Choice (2016)
- Ask Yourself (2017)
- The Longest Journey (2017)
