= Oyster (Heather Nova album) =

Studio album by Heather Nova
- Released: October 24, 1994
- Genres: Alternative rock; indie rock
- Length: 56:55
- Labels: Butterfly; Big Life
- Producers: Felix Tod; Youth

Heather Nova chronology
Blow (1993)	Oyster (1994)	Siren (1998)

Alternative cover
- U.S. cover

Oyster is the second studio album by Heather Nova, released in 1994.

== Critical response ==
Professional ratings
Review scores
Source	Rating
AllMusic	3.5/5 stars
The Vancouver Sun	3/4 stars
The Virgin Encyclopedia of Nineties Music	4/5 stars

Katherine Monk of the Vancouver Sun awarded the album three out of four stars, praising Nova's vocals. Stephen Thomas Erlewine, writing for AllMusic, praised the album, awarding it four and a half out of five stars: "The best moments on her second album, Oyster, rank among her very best work, demonstrating that she can pull off ballads, guitar pop, and hard rock with equal aplomb."

== Track listing ==
All tracks are written by Heather Nova.

United Kingdom pressing
No.	Title	Length
1.	"Walk This World"	3:49
2.	"Heal"	3:55
3.	"Island"	6:20
4.	"Throwing Fire at the Sun"	5:57
5.	"Maybe An Angel"	5:08
6.	"Truth and Bone"	4:54
7.	"Blue Black"	4:36
8.	"Walking Higher"	4:12
9.	"Light Years"	4:49
10.	"Verona"	4:02
11.	"Doubled Up"	3:39 (Note: Some European releases feature a version running 4:13, which has an extended opening sequence of instruments being tuned.)

All tracks are written by Heather Nova.

North American pressing
No.	Title	Length
1.	"Walk This World"	3:49
2.	"Heal"	3:55
3.	"Island"	6:20
4.	"Throwing Fire at the Sun"	5:57
5.	"Maybe An Angel"	5:08
6.	"Sugar"	5:34
7.	"Truth and Bone"	4:54
8.	"Blue Black"	4:36
9.	"Walking Higher"	4:12
10.	"Light Years"	4:49
11.	"Verona"	4:02
12.	"Doubled Up"	3:39

B-sides

1. "Home" (Note: B-side to the single release of "Walk This World")
2. "Blind" (Note: B-side to the single release of "Walk This World")
3. "Walk This World" (acoustic)

== Personnel ==
- Heather Nova – vocals, acoustic guitar
- David Ayers – bass, electric guitar, twelve-string guitar
- Nadia Lanman – cello
- Dean McCormick – percussion, drums
- Hossam Ramzy – percussion
- Bob Thompson – drums
- Youth – bass
- Felix Tod, Youth – producers
- David Bianco, Christopher Marc Potter, Paul Rabiger – engineers
- The album is dedicated to her first cousin once removed Signe Savannah (last name unknown), who was born the year of its release.

== Charts ==
=== Weekly charts ===
Chart (1994–1995)	Peak position
Australian Albums (ARIA)	78
Belgian Albums (Ultratop Flanders)	33
Dutch Albums (Album Top 100)	70
German Albums (Offizielle Top 100)	43
New Zealand Albums (RMNZ)	23
Swiss Albums (Schweizer Hitparade)	33
UK Albums (Official Charts)	72
US Billboard 200	179
US Heatseekers Albums (Billboard)	7

=== Year-end charts ===
Chart (1995)	Position
Belgian Albums (Ultratop Flanders)	90

=== Singles ===
Year	Single	Chart	Position
1995	"Walk This World"	Billboard Modern Rock Tracks	13
1998	"Walk This World"	New Zealand RIANZ Top 40	19
