= Someone New (Eskobar song) =

Single by Eskobar featuring Heather Nova

from the album There's Only Now
- Released: March 30, 2002
- Genre: Pop rock
- Length: 3:30
- Label: V2

Eskobar featuring Heather Nova singles chronology
"Tell Me I'm Wrong" (2001)	"Someone New" (2002)	"On the Ground" (2002)

"Someone New" is a 2002 single released by Eskobar featuring Heather Nova. The duet was an international hit.

Although both artists are still primarily known in Europe, the popularity of "Someone New" saw Eskobar and Heather Nova's fan base reach America through MTV.

== Music video ==
The success of the song has been attributed to the "Someone New" music video, which also featured Heather Nova, and made its rounds on the European music television channels.

== Charts ==
=== Weekly charts ===
Chart (2002)	Peak position
Belgium (Ultratop 50 Flanders)	14
Belgium (Ultratop 50 Wallonia)	32
Denmark (Tracklisten)	21
Netherlands (Single Top 100)	88
Poland (Polish Airplay Chart)	4
Sweden (Sverigetopplistan)	14
Switzerland (Schweizer Hitparade)	14

=== Year-end charts ===
Chart (2002)	Position
Belgium (Ultratop Flanders)	61
Sweden (Sverigetopplistan)	58

== In the media ==
The song was featured in a television commercial for the 3G mobile operator 3, and later in a commercial for Peugeot 208.
