= Michael Bojesen =

Danish composer

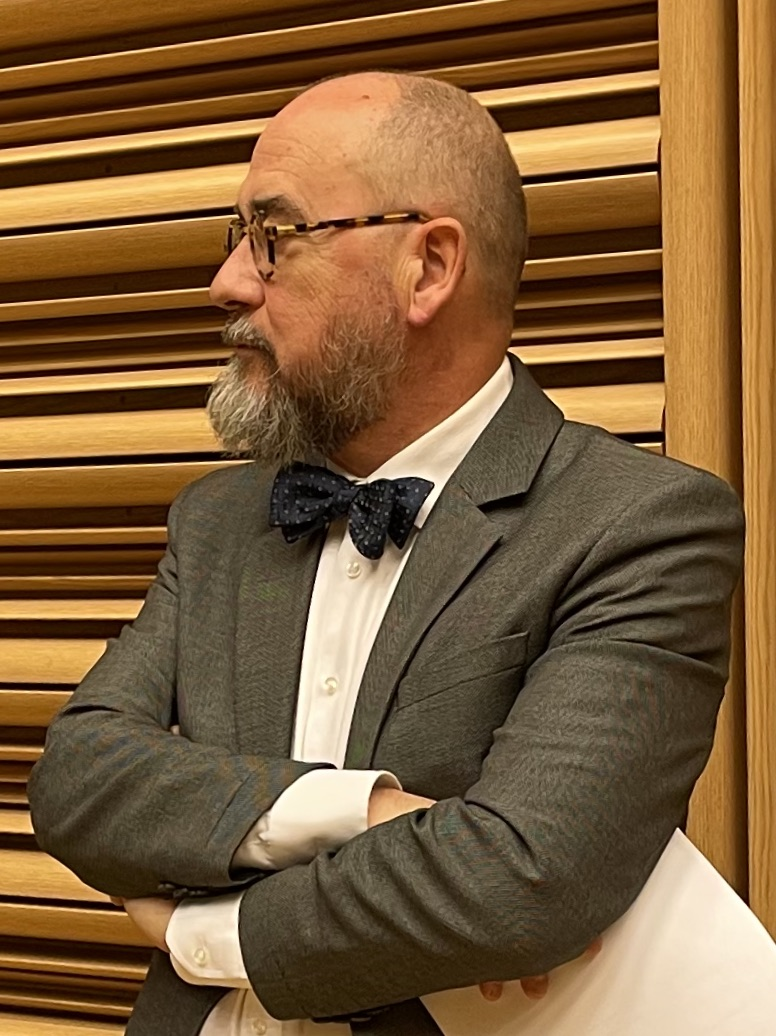
- Bojesen in 2022
- Born: 7 August 1960 (age 65); Copenhagen, Denmark
- Education: Royal Danish Academy of Music
- Occupations: conductor, composer, choirmaster and arranger
- Known for: working with the DR Big Band in addition to classical ensembles; former director of Malmö Opera
- Notable work: Pater Noster (1991); Evigheden; These are the days
- Awards: Danish annual prize for choral composition (1998)

Michael Bojesen (born 7 August 1960) is a Danish conductor, composer, choirmaster and arranger. He is former director of Malmö Opera where he served from 2017 to 2022. He won the Danish annual prize for choral composition in 1998.

== Biography ==
Bojesen was born in Copenhagen. He graduated from the Royal Danish Academy of Music in 1984. From 1984 to 2001 he taught at the Sankt Annæ Gymnasium, a secondary school in Copenhagen specialising in singing, where he was choirmaster from 1991 to 2001. From 1989 to 2006 he was the conductor of the Camerata chamber choir, and from 2001 to 2010 chief conductor of the DR Girls' Choir, after which he became honorary conductor. He took over the direction of the Copenhagen Opera Festival in September 2012. He has also been a docent at the Academy of Music (from 1994 to 2003).

He is known as a versatile conductor, working with the DR Big Band in addition to classical ensembles.

== Sexual misconduct allegations ==
Bojesen has been accused of allowing a sexualised environment by several former members of DR Girls' choir. The issue was first reported to the general public in 2021 by Danish newspaper Politiken. As a consequence of the lawyers' analysis of the complaints, Bojesen was stripped of his title as honorary conductor of DR Girls' choir. In 2022, accusations appeared concerning Bojesen's former employment as choirmaster at Sankt Annæ Gymnasium, including that during his time there, he was in a relationship with an underage student.

== Works ==
- Pater Noster (1991)
- Evigheden
- These are the days

He has also arranged works for the Danish Concert Choir, the Danish National Chamber Orchestra and the Danish National Symphony Orchestra, among others.

== Awards ==
Bojesen won the Danish annual prize for choral composition in 1998. In 1999 a recording of Messiah in which he participated won the Danish Grammy for the year's best Danish recording, and choirs under his direction have three times been honoured with first prizes: Camerata at Arezzo in 1992 and 2002, and the DR Girls' Choir as "Choir of the World 2002 Kathaumiwx". In 2011 The Jazz Ballad Song Book, a recording by the DR Big Band in which he conducted the Danish National Chamber Orchestra was nominated for four Grammy Awards in jazz categories.
