= Sing No Sad Songs for Me =

Studio album by Lorez Alexandria
- Released: 1961
- Recorded: 1960/61
- Genre: Jazz
- Length: 29:13
- Label: Argo; LP/LPS-682
- Producer: Ralph Bass

Lorez Alexandria chronology
Early in the Morning (1960)	Sing No Sad Songs for Me (1961)	Deep Roots (1962)

Sing No Sad Songs for Me is an album by American jazz vocalist Lorez Alexandria released by the Argo label in 1961.

== Critical reception ==
Professional ratings
Review scores
Source	Rating
AllMusic	3.5/5 stars

AllMusic reviewer Scott Yanow stated "The emphasis is on ballads and standards, with Alexandria putting plenty of feeling into such numbers as "Gloomy Sunday," "Motherless Child," and "A Loser's Lullaby." Some of the material is a little more upbeat, although each selection is taken at a thoughtful pace, with the singer sounding relaxed ... Riley Hampton's arrangements for the unidentified orchestra are tasteful and supportive without ever taking attention away from the singer. Although not essential, this album is worth a search".

== Track listing ==
1. "A Loser's Lullaby" (Sid Wayne, Sherman Edwards) – 3:45
2. "Trouble in Mind" (Richard M. Jones) – 3:05
3. "Sing No Sad Songs for Me" (Dino Courreay) – 3:05
4. "Gloomy Sunday" (Rezső Seress, László Jávor, Sam M. Lewis) – 3:12
5. "Motherless Child" (Traditional) – 2:21
6. "Who" (S. Lewis) – 2:40
7. "I'll Remember April" (Gene de Paul, Patricia Johnston, Don Raye) – 2:55
8. "Lonesome Road" (Nathaniel Shilkret, Gene Austin) – 3:20
9. "They Can't Take That Away from Me" (George Gershwin, Ira Gershwin) – 2:15
10. "All My Love" (Lewis) – 2:35

== Personnel ==
- Lorez Alexandria – vocals
- Unidentified orchestra arranged and conducted by Riley Hampton
