= John Young (jazz pianist) =

American jazz pianist

- Born: March 16, 1922
- Origin: Chicago, Illinois, U.S.
- Died: April 16, 2008 (aged 86)
- Genres: Jazz
- Occupation: Musician
- Instruments: Piano, keyboards
- Years active: 1940s–1990s
- Labels: Delmark, Argo

John Merritt Young (March 16, 1922 – April 16, 2008) was an American jazz pianist. Young played with Sarah Vaughan, Ella Fitzgerald, Dexter Gordon, and many others. He recorded with his own trio in the 1950s and 1960s, and was a sideman for Von Freeman, Gene Ammons and others. He remained active in the Chicago jazz scene until a few years before his death.

== Biography ==
Young was born in Little Rock, Arkansas, and his family relocated to Chicago when he was a toddler. He first toured in the 1940s with the big band Andy Kirk and His Twelve Clouds of Joy. After Young left Kirk's band and returned to Chicago, he performed with the Dick Davis combo until 1950, when he formed his own combo with Eldridge Freeman on drums and Leroy Jackson on bass. In 1957, he signed with Argo Records and recorded his first LP, Opus de Funk.

He was active in the Chicago jazz scene, regularly playing popular clubs with artists such as Dexter Gordon, Big Joe Turner, Von Freeman and others. He made more than a dozen appearances at the Chicago Jazz Festival, often as a sideman for tenor saxophonist Eddie Johnson. He retired in 2005 due to sciatic nerve inflammation. He died from multiple myeloma on April 16, 2008.

Dan Morgenstern, in Living with Jazz, called Young "one of Chicago's several unsung piano originals". Allmusic.com called Young "criminally underappreciated outside of [the Chicago bop scene]".

== Discography ==
=== As leader ===
Year recorded	Title	Label	Personnel/Notes
1956	Young John Young	Argo	Trio, with Herbert Brown (bass), Larry Jackson (drums)
1957	Opus de Funk	Vee-Jay	Trio, with Herbert Brown (bass), Larry Jackson (drums)
1959	The John Young Trio	Delmark	Trio, with Vic Sproles (bass), Phil Thomas (drums); also released as Serenata
1961	Themes and Things	Argo	Trio, with William Yancey (bass), Phil Thomas (drums)
1962	A Touch of Pepper	Argo	Trio, with Sam Kidd (bass), Phil Thomas (drums)

=== As sideman ===
With Lorez Alexandria

- Deep Roots (Argo, 1962)
- For Swingers Only (Argo, 1963)

With Gene Ammons and Dexter Gordon

- The Chase! (Prestige, 1970)

With Bobby Bryant

- Big Band Blues (Vee Jay, 1961)

With George Freeman

- New Improved Funk (Groove Merchant, 1973)

With Von Freeman

- Doin' It Right Now (Atlantic, 1972)
- Have No Fear (Nessa, 1975)
- Young and Foolish, Von Freeman, (Nessa, 1977)
- Serenade & Blues, Von Freeman, (Nessa, 1979)

With Al Grey

- Boss Bone (Argo, 1963)

With Sonny Stitt and Zoot Sims

- Inter-Action (Cadet, 1965)

With T-Bone Walker

- T-Bone Blues (Atlantic, 1959)
