= Stormy Weather (AT&T album) =

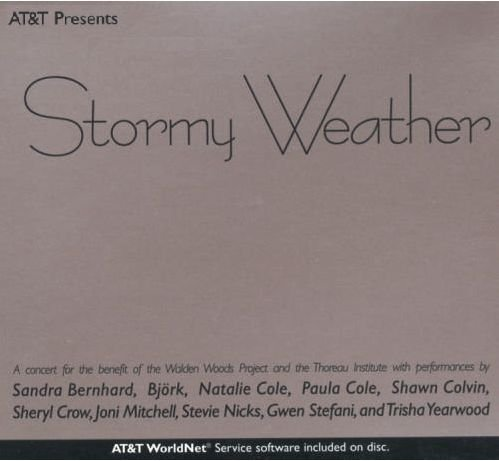

Live album by various artists
- Released: May 31, 1998
- Recorded: April 16, 1998
- Venue: Wiltern Theatre, Los Angeles, California
- Genre: Traditional pop; jazz; blues
- Length: 43:48
- Label: The Isis Fund
- Producer: Don Henley

Stormy Weather is a live compilation album by various artists released by The Isis Fund in 1998. The record was produced by Don Henley as part of the Walden Woods Project, with which Henley is associated. It features ten covers of songs, all by different female musicians, and was funded by AT&T and the Thoreau Institute. The CD was issued solely to longtime customers of AT&T and included complimentary and downloadable internet access software. Stormy Weather received three out of a five stars from AllMusic and was received favorably by Frank Tortorici of Sonic.net.

== Background ==
Stormy Weather was released on May 31, 1998, exclusively available to longtime customers of the American multinational telecommunications corporation AT&T. It is paired alongside downloadable computer software for AT&T's internet access service, WorldNet's Personal Network. All of the performances were recorded live by AT&T and the Thoreau Institute at the Wiltern Theatre in Los Angeles, California on April 16, 1998. The concert was held to expand the mission of the Walden Woods Project, a nonprofit organization created to help the preservation of Walden Woods in Lincoln, Massachusetts.

Rock musician Don Henley organized the event and carried out production on all ten tracks, while Vince Mendoza was in charge of the musical arrangements and conducting the orchestra. At the venue, each artist sang two songs, although only one song from each artist appears on the record. According to The Walden Wood Project's official website, the album contains "pop, jazz, and blues standards" predominantly from the 1930s, 40's, and 50's, performed by ten female musicians. It opens with a version of Elvis Costello's "Almost Blue", performed by Gwen Stefani. Sandra Bernhard sang a rendition of "Is That All There Is?" in an "exaggerated high pitch vocal" with "comic anecdotes". Joni Mitchell performed the album's title track, a cover of Ethel Waters' 1933 single "Stormy Weather". The orchestration was performed by the 66-piece El Nino Orchestra.

== Critical reception ==
Professional ratings
Review scores
Source	Rating
AllMusic	3/5 stars

Due to not being commercially released, Stormy Weather was not widely reviewed by music critics. William Ruhlmann from AllMusic awarded the record three out of a five stars, praising the artists' familiarity with the songs. He highlighted Mark Isham's trumpet solos and the covers of "You've Changed", "But Beautiful" and "At Last" as standouts, but had mixed feelings regarding Sheryl Crow and Björk's contributions. Frank Tortorici of Sonic.net enjoyed the performances and commented in reference to the concert that Joni Mitchell and Bjork's collaboration was "hard to beat."

== Track listing ==
All tracks produced by Don Henley.

Stormy Weather – Standard edition
No.	Title	Writer(s)	Performer(s)	Length
1.	"Almost Blue"	Elvis Costello	Gwen Stefani	3:02
2.	"You've Changed"	Bill Carey; Carl Fischer	Paula Cole	5:27
3.	"But Beautiful"	James Van Heusen; Johnny Burke	Shawn Colvin	4:30
4.	"Good Guy"	Jude Johnstone	Trisha Yearwood	4:18
5.	"Is That All There Is?"	Jerry Leiber; Mike Stoller	Sandra Bernhard	4:29
6.	"Good Morning Heartache"	Dan Fisher; Irene Higginbotham; Ervin M. Drake	Sheryl Crow	5:18
7.	"They Can't Take That Away from Me"	George Gershwin; Ira Gershwin	Natalie Cole	3:17
8.	"At Last"	Mack Gordon; Harry Warren	Stevie Nicks	4:07
9.	"Gloomy Sunday"	László Jávor; Samuel M. Lewis; Rezső Seress	Björk	5:33
10.	"Stormy Weather"	Ted Koehler; Harold Arlen	Joni Mitchell	3:45
Total length:				43:48

== Personnel ==
Credits adapted from the album's liner notes.

- Ted Barela – assistant recorder
- Chuck Berghofer – bass
- Charlie Bouis – assistant recorder
- Gloria Boyce – artist coordinator
- J.D. Brill – house mixer
- Jim Cox – piano
- Steve Crandall – lighting
- Peter Erskine – drums
- Gary Foster – alto saxophone
- Marcy Gensic – orchestra production coordinator
- David George – set design
- Adam Haller – assistant engineer
- Don Henley – production
- Bob Hurwitz – accountant
- Mark Isham – trumpet
- Rob Jacobs – recording
- Plas Johnson – tenor saxophone
- Jeff Jones – librarian
- Larry Klein – mixing, musical direction
- Edd Kolakowski - piano technician
- Vince Mendoza – arranging, conduction
- Leslie Morris – orchestra manager
- Peter Morse – lighting director
- Neal Preston – photography
- Kevin Royan – lighting
- Ben Sepeda – lighting
- Arnold Serame – lighting programming
- Mike Shipley – mixing
- Tony Taibi – production manager
