= Desmond Carter =

British lyricist (1895–1939)

Herbert Desmond Carter (15 June 1895 – 3 February 1939) was a British lyricist who worked with George and Ira Gershwin, Ivor Novello, and others, and also wrote one of the first English language versions of the notorious "suicide song", "Gloomy Sunday".

He was born in Bristol. In 1924 he wrote most of the lyrics for the London musical Primrose, for which Gershwin wrote the music, his first commission outside the US. The musical was revived in 2003, when one reviewer wrote:

"...by far the most outstanding contribution to Primrose is the comedy lyrics of Desmond Carter, who penned the words to seventeen of the score's twenty-two songs and collaborated with Ira Gershwin on four of the remaining five. Two among them, "Isn't It Horrible What They Did to Mary, Queen of Scots" and "That New Fangled Mother of Mine," shine with humor and wordplay worthy of Noel Coward."

In 1936, Carter wrote English lyrics for the song "Gloomy Sunday" ("Szomorú vasárnap"), which had been written by Hungarian composer Rezső Seress with lyrics by László Jávor. Carter's lyrics were performed and recorded by Paul Robeson, whose recording was successful although most later versions of the song used alternative lyrics by American writer Sam M. Lewis.

Carter also collaborated with leading English popular composers of the period, including Ivor Novello and Noel Gay. He died in London at the age of 43.
