= More of the Great Lorez Alexandria =

Studio album by Lorez Alexandria
- Released: 1964
- Recorded: 1964
- Genre: Vocal jazz
- Length: 33:06
- Label: Impulse!
- Producer: Tutti Camerata

Lorez Alexandria chronology
| Alexandria the Great (1964) | More of the Great Lorez Alexandria (1964) | Didn't We (1968) |

More of the Great Lorez Alexandria is an album by American jazz vocalist Lorez Alexandria featuring performances recorded in 1964 for the Impulse! label.

== Reception ==
Professional ratings
Review scores
| Source | Rating |
|---|---|
| AllMusic | 4.5/5 stars |

The AllMusic review awarded the album 4½ stars.

== Track listing ==
1. "But Beautiful" (Johnny Burke, Jimmy van Heusen) – 4:18
2. "Little Boat (O Barquinho)" (Ronaldo Boscoli, Roberto Menescal) – 2:17
3. "Dancing on the Ceiling" (Lorenz Hart, Richard Rodgers) – 1:32
4. "It Might as Well Be Spring" (Oscar Hammerstein II, Rodgers) – 6:58
5. "Once (It S'Aim Aient)" (Norman Gimbel, Guy Magenta, Eddy Marney) – 2:20
6. "The Wildest Gal in Town" (Sammy Fain, Jack Yellen) – 2:54
7. "Angel Eyes" (Earl Brent, Matt Dennis) – 4:53
8. "This Could Be the Start of Something Big" (Steve Allen) – 2:20
9. "No More" (Tutti Camarata, Bob Russell) – 3:09
10. "That Far Away Look" (Marilyn Bergman, Alan Bergman, Fain) – 2:25

- Recorded in New York City in 1964

== Personnel ==
- Lorez Alexandria – vocals, finger pops
- Paul Horn – flute, alto saxophone
- Wynton Kelly – piano
- Ray Crawford – guitar
- Al McKibbon – bass
- Jimmy Cobb – drums
- Unidentified orchestra led by Toots Camarata
