= John Neely (musician) =

American jazz musician

John Neely (January 29, 1930 in Chicago – October 8, 1994 in Richton Park, Illinois) was a jazz tenor saxophonist and arranger.

A member of King Fleming's Quintette (with Russell Williams and Lorez Alexandria) which recorded for the Chicago-based Blue Lake label in early 1954, he had played with Clifford Jordan in 1949.

In 1960, Neely recorded with pianist Earl Washington for the Formal label in a band which included Walter Perkins on drums.

That same year, Neely went on to join the Lionel Hampton band. Down Beat (February 2, 1961) wrote: "John Neely, 30 year old Chicagoan, is being hailed by his fellows as 'one of the baddest acts in the country and the next BIG man on tenor."
