= American Pie =

American Pie may refer to:

- "American Pie" (song), a 1971 song by Don McLean
  - American Pie (Don McLean album), the 1971 Don McLean album which included the namesake song
- American Pie (Groove Holmes album), a 1972 album by Groove Holmes featuring a cover of the above song
- "American Pie", a 2018 song by Shea Diamond
- American Pie (film series), a series of teen films
  - American Pie (film), a 1999 film, first in the series
- American Pie, a 1996 sitcom pilot starring Andy Buckley
- Tim Rice's American Pie, a British radio programme about American music, hosted by Tim Rice
- Pie in American cuisine
  - American Pie Council
