= Jávor =

Jávor is a Hungarian surname, Slavic name of Acer/Maple. Notable people with the surname include:

- Benedek Jávor (born 1972), Hungarian politician
- László Jávor (1903–1992), Hungarian poet and painter
- Pál Jávor (actor) (1902–1959), Hungarian actor
