= Alexandria the Great =

Studio album by Lorez Alexandria
- Released: 1964
- Recorded: 1964
- Genre: Vocal jazz
- Length: 35:48
- Label: Impulse!
- Producer: Bob Thiele

Lorez Alexandria chronology
For Swingers Only (1963)	Alexandria the Great (1964)	More of the Great Lorez Alexandria (1964)

Professional ratings
Review scores
Source	Rating
Allmusic	4.5/5 stars
The Rolling Stone Jazz Record Guide	2/5 stars

Alexandria the Great is the third studio album by the American jazz singer Lorez Alexandria.

== Track listing ==
1. "Show Me" (Alan Jay Lerner, Frederick Loewe) – 4:05
2. "I've Never Been in Love Before" (Frank Loesser) – 2:20
3. "Satin Doll" (Duke Ellington, Johnny Mercer, Billy Strayhorn) – 2:47
4. "My One and Only Love" (Robert Mellin, Guy Wood) – 4:30
5. "Over the Rainbow" (Harold Arlen, Yip Harburg) – 3:59
6. "Get Me to the Church on Time" (Lerner, Loewe) – 4:03
7. "The Best Is Yet to Come" (Cy Coleman, Carolyn Leigh) – 2:46
8. "I've Grown Accustomed to His Face" (Lerner, Loewe) – 4:07
9. "Give Me the Simple Life" (Rube Bloom, Harry Ruby) – 2:23
10. "I'm Through With Love" (Gus Kahn, Jay Livingston, Matty Malneck) – 5:25

== Personnel ==
- Lorez Alexandria – vocals, liner notes, finger snaps
- Tutti Camarata – producer, original recording producer
- Paul Chambers – bass
- Jimmy Cobb – drums
- Ray Crawford – guitar
- Victor Feldman – piano, vibraphone
- Paul Horn – flute, alto sax
- Wynton Kelly – piano
- Al McKibbon – bass
- Bud Shank – flute

== Credits ==
- Bill Marx – arranger
- Ken Druker – executive producer
- Mark Cooper Smith – production assistant
- Sherniece Smith – art producer
- Bob Thiele – producer, liner notes
- Hideaki Nishimura – mastering
- Hollis King – art direction
- Bryan Koniarz – producer
- Joe Lebow – liner design
- Roger Marshutz – photography, cover photo
- Robert Flynn – cover design
