= Super Soul =

Studio album by Richard "Groove" Holmes
- Released: 1967
- Recorded: April 26 & 27, 1967; Chicago, Illinois
- Genre: Jazz
- Label: Prestige; PR 7497
- Producer: Cal Lampley

Richard "Groove" Holmes chronology
Spicy! (1966)	Super Soul (1967)	Get Up & Get It! (1967)

Super Soul is an album by jazz organist Richard "Groove" Holmes fronting a big band which was recorded in 1967 in Chicago and released on the Prestige label.

== Reception ==
Professional ratings
Review scores
Source	Rating
Allmusic	2/5 stars

Allmusic awarded the album 2 stars stating "Super Soul was a little funkier than much soul-jazz that had passed before 1967, and its horn parts sometimes slanted more toward pop and soundtrack territory... The album's a little on the innocuous side, even for a genre (Prestige 1960s soul-jazz) that can be pretty homogeneous. It's easygoing background party music, though Holmes summons an interesting light, prickly, almost vibes-like organ sound at times".

== Track listing ==
1. "Why Don't You Do Right?" (Kansas Joe McCoy, Herb Morand) - 3:40
2. "Ain't That Peculiar" (Pete Moore, Smokey Robinson, Marv Tarplin, Ronald White) - 3:20
3. "In Between the Heartaches" (Burt Bacharach, Hal David) - 3:20
4. "Function at the Junction" (Eddie Holland, Fredrick Long) - 3:11
5. "Green Dolphin Street" (Bronisław Kaper, Ned Washington) - 6:40
6. "I Will Wait for You" (Michel Legrand, Jacques Demy) - 4:00
7. "Back Home Again in Indiana" (Ballard MacDonald, James F. Hanley) - 5:08
8. "Tennessee Waltz" (Redd Stewart, Pee Wee King) - 2:40
9. "Bluesette" (Toots Thielemans) - 4:10
10. "Super Soul" (Richard "Groove" Holmes) - 3:05

== Personnel ==
- Richard "Groove" Holmes - organ
- The Super Soul Big Band arranged and conducted by Richard Evans
