= Tricky Lofton =

American jazz trombonist (1930–1993)

- Born: Lawrence Ellis Lofton; May 28, 1930; Houston, Texas, U.S.
- Died: December 15, 1993 (aged 63)
- Genres: Jazz; blues; R&B
- Occupation: Musician
- Instrument: Trombone
- Years active: 1960s
- Labels: Pacific Jazz

Lawrence "Tricky" Lofton (May 28, 1930 – December 15, 1993) was an American jazz trombonist. He studied with Kid Ory and J. J. Johnson, and made several recordings with Carmell Jones.

== Discography ==
=== As leader ===
- Brass Bag (Pacific Jazz, PJ-49; 1962), with Carmell Jones and arrangements by Gerald Wilson
- Love Lifted Me & Brass Bag (Fresh Sound Records, FSR-CD 772; 2013)[1961, 1962], with Ron Jefferson

=== As sideman ===
- Bill Berry & His L.A. Big Band, Hello Rev (Concord Jazz, 1976)
- Bill Doggett, Dance Awhile with Doggett (King, 1958)
- Jon Hendricks, Tell Me the Truth (Arista, 1975)
- Richard "Groove" Holmes, The Dynamic Jazz Organ of Richard Groove Holmes (Pacific Jazz, 1961)
- Richard "Groove" Holmes, Groove (Pacific Jazz, 1961)
- Richard "Groove" Holmes, Tell It Like It Tis (Pacific Jazz, 1966)
- Carmell Jones, Mosaic Select (Mosaic, 2003)
- Joe Liggins, Dripper's Boogie, Vol. 2 (Ace, 1992)
- Les McCann, Les McCann Sings (Pacific Jazz, 1961)
- Les McCann, Oh Brother! (Fontana, 1964)
- Jimmy McGriff, Let's Stay Together (Groove Merchant, 1972)
