= Standards with a Slight Touch of Jazz =

Studio album by Lorez Alexandria
- Released: 1960
- Recorded: February 1959 and November 1960
- Studio: Chicago, Illinois
- Genre: Jazz
- Length: 38:06
- Label: King; King 676

Lorez Alexandria chronology
The Band Swings - Lorez Sings (1959)	Standards with a Slight Touch of Jazz (1960)	Early in the Morning (1960)

Standards with a Slight Touch of Jazz, also known by its subtitle Singing Songs Everybody Knows, is an album by American jazz vocalist Lorez Alexandria released by the King label in 1960.

== Critical reception ==
Professional ratings
Review scores
Source	Rating
AllMusic	3/5 stars

AllMusic reviewer Hank Davis called the album "very collectible".

== Track listing ==
1. "Just One of Those Things" (Cole Porter) – 4:19
2. "Then I'll Be Tired of You" (Arthur Schwartz, Yip Harburg) – 2:48
3. "Lush Life" (Billy Strayhorn) – 2:06
4. "Sometimes I'm Happy" (Vincent Youmans, Irving Caesar) – 2:29
5. "Long Ago (and Far Away)" (Ira Gershwin, Jerome Kern) – 2:59
6. "But Beautiful" (Jimmy Van Heusen, Johnny Burke) – 2:15
7. "I'm Beginning to See the Light" (Duke Ellington, Don George, Johnny Hodges, Harry James) – 4:20
8. "I Can't Believe That You're in Love with Me" (Jimmy McHugh, Clarence Gaskill) – 3:05
9. "Spring Is Here" (Richard Rodgers, Lorenz Hart) – 3:35
10. "Angel Eyes" (Matt Dennis, Earl Brent) – 4:20
11. "Better Luck Next Time" (Irving Berlin) – 3:05
12. "I Didn't Know What Time It Was" (Rodgers, Hart) – 3:36

== Personnel ==
- Lorez Alexandria – vocals
- Unidentified musicians
