= Gloomy Sunday =

1933 single by Rezső Seress

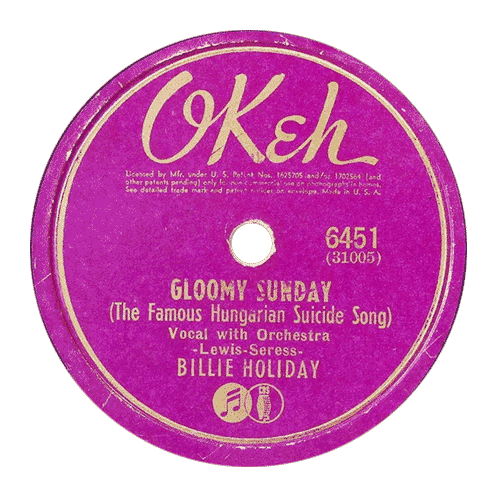
- The version by Billie Holiday, released on the OKeh label in 1941.

Song by Rezső Seress
- Language: Hungarian
- English title: Gloomy Sunday
- Written: 1933
- Recorded: 1935
- Genre: Traditional pop, jazz
- Length: 3:10
- Songwriter: Rezső Seress

"Gloomy Sunday" (Hungarian: Szomorú Vasárnap) is a song composed by Hungarian pianist and composer Rezső Seress and published in 1933.

The original lyrics were titled "Vége a világnak" ('The World Is Ending') and were about despair caused by war, ending in a quiet prayer about people's sins. Poet László Jávor wrote his own lyrics to the song, titled "Szomorú vasárnap" ('Sad Sunday'), in which the protagonist wants to kill himself after his lover ends their relationship. The latter lyrics ended up becoming more popular while the former were essentially forgotten. The song was first recorded in Hungarian by pop singer Pál Kalmár in 1935.

"Gloomy Sunday" was first recorded in English by Hal Kemp in 1936, with lyrics by Sam M. Lewis, and was recorded the same year by Paul Robeson, with lyrics by Desmond Carter. It became well known throughout much of the English-speaking world after the release of a version by jazz and swing music singer Billie Holiday in 1941. Lewis' lyrics refer to suicide, and the record label described it as the "Hungarian Suicide Song". There is a recurring urban legend which claims that many people have taken their own lives while listening to this song, particularly Hungarians.

== Writing and background ==
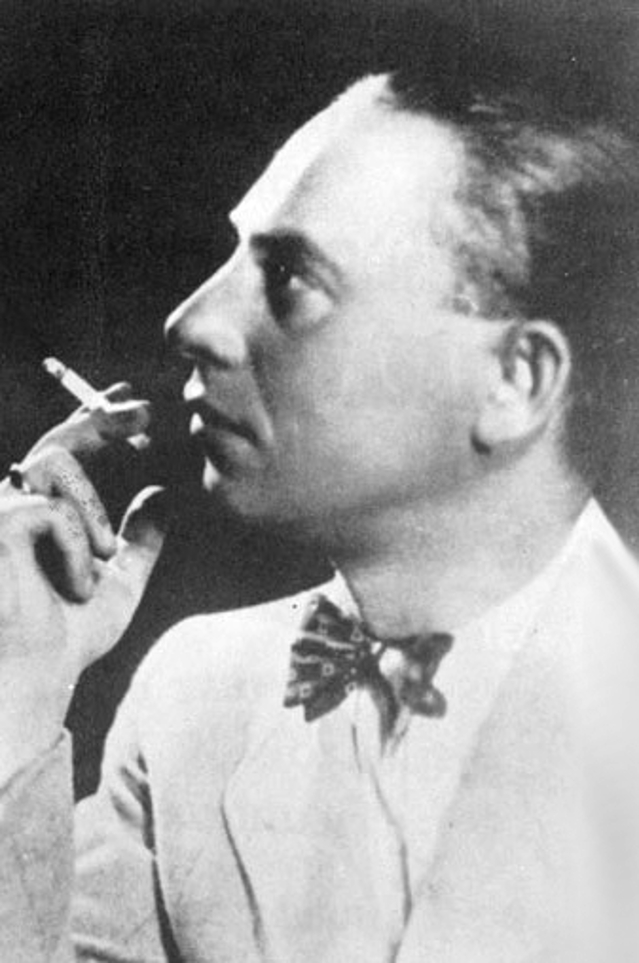
Seress, c. 1925

The song was composed by Rezső Seress while living in Paris, in an attempt to become established as a songwriter in late 1932. The original musical composition was a piano melody in C minor, with the lyrics being sung over it. Seress wrote the song at the time of the Great Depression and increasing fascist influence in his native Hungary, although sources differ as to the degree to which his song was motivated by personal melancholy rather than concerns about the future of the world. The basis of Seress's lyrics is a reproach to the injustices of man, with a prayer to God to have mercy on the modern world and the people who perpetrate evil. There are some suggestions that the words of "Vége a világnak" were in fact not written until World War II itself and not copyrighted until 1946.

Seress initially had difficulty finding a publisher, mainly due to the unusually melancholy nature of the song. One potential publisher stated, "It is not that the song is sad, there is a sort of terrible compelling despair about it. I don't think it would do anyone any good to hear a song like that."

The song was published as sheet music in late 1933, with lyrics by poet László Jávor, who was inspired by a recent break-up with his fiancée. According to most sources, Jávor rewrote the lyrics after the song's first publication, although he is sometimes described as the original writer of its words. His lyrics contained no political sentiments, but rather were a lament for the death of a beloved and a pledge to meet with the lover again in the afterlife. This version of the song became the best known, and most later rewritings are based around the idea of lost love.

== Urban legends ==
There have been several urban legends regarding the song over the years, mostly involving it being allegedly connected with various numbers of suicides, and radio networks reacting by purportedly banning the song. However, most of these claims are unsubstantiated.

Press reports in the 1930s associated at least 100 suicides, both in Hungary and the United States, with "Gloomy Sunday", but most of the deaths supposedly linked to it are difficult to verify. The urban legend appears to be, for the most part, simply an embellishment of the high number of Hungarian suicides that occurred in the decade when the song was composed due to other factors such as famine and poverty. No studies have drawn a clear link between the song and suicide.

On 11 January 1968, about 35 years after writing the song, Seress committed suicide.

The BBC banned Billie Holiday's version of the song from being broadcast, as being detrimental to wartime morale, but allowed performances of instrumental versions. In America, the version performed by Paul Robeson was prohibited on some radio stations and nightclubs. However, there is little evidence of any other radio bans; the BBC's ban was lifted by 2002.

== Later recordings and notable performances ==
The song's notoriety contributed towards many other notable artists later recording the song, including:

- 1935: Katalin Karády
- 1936: Clifford Greenwood & Paul Robeson
- 1936: Paul Whiteman & Johnny Hauser
- 1936: Mieczysław Fogg (in Polish as "Smutna niedziela")
- 1936: Damia (in French as "Sombre dimanche")
- 1936: Noriko Awaya (in Japanese as "Kurai Nichiyōbi (暗い日曜日)")
- 1936: Hildegarde
- 1936: Agustín Magaldi (in Spanish as "Triste domingo")
- 1937: Pyotr Leshchenko (in Russian as "Мрачный воскресный день")
- 1937: Mercedes Simone (in Spanish as "Triste Domingo")
- 1940: Artie Shaw + Pauline Byrne
- 1941: Billie Holiday
- 1946: Luis Russell + Lee Richardson
- 1958: Ricky Nelson
- 1958: Mel Tormé
- 1959: Eila Pellinen (in Finnish as "Surullinen sunnuntai")
- 1961: Sarah Vaughan
- 1961: Lorez Alexandria
- 1962: Ketty Lester
- 1962: Lou Rawls
- 1967: Carmen McRae
- 1967: Stan Kenton
- 1969: Ray Charles
- 1969: Big Maybelle (on Saga of the Good Life & Hard Times)
- 1972: Viktor Klimenko (in Russian as "Ona pred ikonoi", Arseny Golenishchev-Kutuzov lyrics)
- 1975: Jimmy Witherspoon (on Spoonful)
- 1977: Etta Jones (on My Mother's Eyes)
- 1980: Lydia Lunch (on Queen of Siam album)
- 1981: Elvis Costello
- 1982: Associates (Sulk) (Sam M. Lewis, Rezső Seress) (singer Billy Mackenzie died by suicide in 1997)
- 1983: Marc Almond (Torment and Toreros) (Sam M. Lewis, Rezső Seress)
- 1984: Peter Wolf (Lights Out) (Sam M. Lewis, Rezső Seress)
- 1986: Christian Death (Atrocities) (Sam M. Lewis, Rezső Seress)
- 1987: Dead Milkmen (as a bridge in their song "(Theme from) Blood Orgy of the Atomic Fern")
- 1987: Serge Gainsbourg (French version)
- 1987: Abbey Lincoln
- 1987: Marianne Faithfull
- 1991: Vlado Kreslin (Bela nedelja) (Vlado Kreslin lyrics)
- 1991: Hot Club de Norvège (The Best of Hot Club de Norvege with Ivar Brodahl On Violin)
- 1992: Diamanda Galás (The Singer) (Desmond Carter lyrics)
- 1992: Sinéad O'Connor (Am I Not Your Girl?)
- 1993: Gitane Demone (on her 1993 album Love for Sale)
- 1994: Anton LaVey (Released it in his 10" "Strange Music")
- 1994: John Williams (instrumental arrangement as background in Schindler's List)
- 1995: Satan's Cheerleaders
- 1995: Creed Taylor Orchestra
- 1996: Sarah McLachlan (using Sam M. Lewis lyrics; from the Rarities, B-Sides, and Other Stuff album)
- 1998: Danny Michel (from the "Clear" album)
- 1999: Björk (Stormy Weather compilation) (she also performed it live at the funeral of her friend, the fashion designer Alexander McQueen, who died by suicide in 2010.)
- 1999: The Smithereens (on God Save The Smithereens album)
- 1999: Heather Nova (Recording of the eponymous song in the 1999 film Ein Lied von Liebe und Tod)
- 1999: Ben Becker (soundtrack of Ein Lied von Liebe und Tod - Gloomy Sunday – A Song of Love and Death)
- 1999: Erika Marozsán (soundtrack of Ein Lied von Liebe und Tod - Gloomy Sunday – A Song of Love and Death)
- 2000: Kronos Quartet (instrumental for string quartet)
- 2000: Ricky Nelson (Legacy album)
- 2000: Sarah Brightman (using Sam M. Lewis lyrics; on La Luna)
- 2001: Heather Nova (on the South album, and the recording of the eponymous song in the 1999 film Ein Lied von Liebe und Tod)
- 2001: Iva Bittová
- 2001: NRG Ensemble (The Hal Russell Story)
- 2002: Hans Koller (Lovers and Strangers)
- 2003: Priscilla Chan
- 2004: Vlado Kreslin
- 2004: Branford Marsalis Quartet
- 2005: Venetian Snares (from Rossz Csillag Alatt Született, under Hungarian title "Öngyilkos vasárnap", literally meaning "Suicidal Sunday", incorporating a sample of Billie Holiday's 1941 rendition)
- 2005: Jaurim in the album 靑春禮瓚 (청춘예찬, Ode to Youth)
- 2005: Karin Krog
- 2005: Herbie Mann (Herbie Mann String Album)
- 2006: Mickey Baker
- 2006: Lucía Jiménez
- 2006: Greta Keller
- 2006: London Concertante
- 2006: Quadro Nuevo
- 2007: Lajos Dudas
- 2008: Page Cavanaugh
- 2009: Emilie Autumn (Billie Holiday lyrics - first 2 verses only)
- 2010: Anna von Hausswolff (Track on Time EP)
- 2010: Leander Rising
- 2010: Pallbearer (demo)
- 2011: Marissa Nadler and Ryan Lee Crosby
- 2012: Matt Elliott (on his record store day split with Manyfingers)
- 2013: Dax Riggs (live performances)
- 2014: Angelina Jordan (Norske Talenter)
- 2015: Isyana Sarasvati (Indonesian Singer)
- 2017: Severija Janušauskaitė (in the series Babylon Berlin and on the soundtrack album)

== Legacy ==
A cover of the song appeared on the Associates' second studio album Sulk, released on 14 May 1982, and named 'Album of the Year' in Melody Maker at the end of 1982. Lead vocalist Billy Mackenzie killed himself on 22 January 1997.

The song's lyrics are featured in the bridge of the Dead Milkmen song "(Theme from) Blood Orgy of the Atomic Fern", on the band's 1987 album Bucky Fellini.

A highly fictional version of the song's origin is at the heart of the 1999 German/Hungarian film Ein Lied von Liebe und Tod (Gloomy Sunday – A Song of Love and Death).

A cover of "Gloomy Sunday" is featured on track three of Venetian Snares's 2005 album Rossz Csillag Alatt Született. It also samples Billie Holiday's vocals.

The song inspired the 2006 movie The Kovak Box, in which a writer is trapped on the island of Mallorca with people who are injected with a microchip that causes them to take their own lives when they hear "Gloomy Sunday". The song plays during the movie, sung by the actress Lucía Jiménez. A music video from the cover was released as part of the movie promotion. The song also features on the soundtrack of Wristcutters: A Love Story (2006), performed by Artie Shaw.

== See also ==
- Copycat suicide
- To ostatnia niedziela
