= That Healin' Feelin' =

That Healin' Feelin' may refer to:

- That Healin' Feelin' (Richard "Groove" Holmes album), 1968
- That Healin' Feelin' (Horace Silver album), 1970
- "That Healing Feeling" (Bear in the Big Blue House), 1999
- "That Healing Feeling" (The New Woody Woodpecker Show), 2000
