= Les McCann Sings =

1961 studio album by Les McCann

Studio album by Les McCann
- Released: 1961
- Recorded: February 28, March 14, April 4, August, 25, 1961; Rex Productions Studio, Hollywood, CA and Pacific Jazz Studios, Los Angeles, CA
- Genre: Jazz
- Length: 34:50
- Label: Pacific Jazz; PJ 31
- Producer: Richard Bock

Les McCann chronology
Pretty Lady (1961)	Les McCann Sings (1961)	Les McCann Ltd. in New York (1961)

Les McCann Sings is an album by pianist and vocalist Les McCann recorded in 1961 and released on the Pacific Jazz label.

== Reception ==
Professional ratings
Review scores
Source	Rating
Allmusic	4/5 stars

The AllMusic review by Ron Wynn called the album: "A super set.... Soul-jazz and blues at their best."

== Track listing ==
1. "Wonder Why" (Nicholas Brodszky, Sammy Cahn) – 2:58
2. "It's Way Past Suppertime" (Les McCann, Vicki Arnold) – 3:06
3. "'Deed I Do" (Fred Rose, Walter Hirsch) – 2:54
4. "Since I Fell for You" (Buddy Johnson) – 3:37
5. "But Not for Me" (George Gershwin, Ira Gershwin) – 2:58
6. "I Cried for You" (Arthur Freed, Abe Lyman, Gus Arnheim) – 2:24
7. "Sweet Georgia Brown" (Ben Bernie, Maceo Pinkard, Kenneth Casey) – 2:27
8. "Please Send Me Someone to Love" (Percy Mayfield) – 2:32
9. "Next Spring" (Marvin Jenkins) – 3:21
10. "Love Letters" (Victor Young, Edward Heyman) – 3:16
11. "On the Street Where You Live" (Frederick Loewe, Alan Jay Lerner) – 3:10
12. "Bye Bye Blackbird" (Ray Henderson, Mort Dixon) – 2:07

== Personnel ==
- Les McCann – vocals, piano
- Herbie Lewis – bass
- Ron Jefferson – drums
- John Audino, Charlie Meeks, Ray Triscari, Jimmy Zito – trumpet (tracks 1, 4, 6 & 8)
- Bob Edmondson (tracks 1, 4, 6 & 8), John Ewing (tracks 1, 4, 6 & 8), Lawrence "Tricky" Lofton (track 9) – trombone
- Kenny Shroyer – bass trombone (tracks 1, 4, 6 & 8)
- Buddy Collette (tracks 1, 2, 4–6, 8 & 10), Charles Lloyd (tracks 1, 4, 6 & 8) – alto saxophone, flute
- Teddy Edwards (tracks 1, 4, 6 & 8), Harold Land (tracks 1, 4, 6 & 8), Ben Webster (track 9) – tenor saxophone
- Jack Nimitz – baritone saxophone (tracks 1, 4, 6 & 8)
- Bobby Bruce, Carl Kalash, Dan Lube, Ed Lustgarten, George Poole, Jerome Reisler, Darrell Terwilliger – violin (tracks 2, 5 & 10)
- Myron Sandler – viola (tracks 2, 5 & 10)
- Charles Gates – cello (tracks 2, 5 & 10)
- Dolo Coker – rhythm piano (tracks 2, 5 & 10)
- Richard "Groove" Holmes – organ (track 9)
- George Freeman – guitar (track 9)
- Gerald Wilson – arranger, conductor, director (tracks 1, 2, 4–6, 8 & 10)
