= Man & Woman (album) =

Studio album by George Freeman
- Released: 1974
- Recorded: 1974
- Studio: Bell Sound (New York City)
- Genre: Jazz
- Length: 41:39
- Label: Groove Merchant; GM 3305
- Producer: Sonny Lester

George Freeman chronology
New Improved Funk (1972)	Man & Woman (1974)	Rebellion (1995)

Man & Woman is an album by American jazz guitarist George Freeman recorded in 1974 and released on the Groove Merchant label.

== Reception ==
Professional ratings
Review scores
Source	Rating
Allmusic	3.5/5 stars

Allmusic's Jason Ankeny said: "While Man & Woman embraces a mellower approach than guitarist George Freeman's other Groove Merchant dates, it's by no means the late-night boudoir record its erotic cover suggests – the stripped-down, nuanced sound instead adheres to a relatively straightforward soul-jazz formula, more focused and earthbound in its orientation than the average Freeman session. ... the guitarist embraces the change of pace, settling comfortably into the music's slow, slinky grooves – not only are his solos as imaginative as before, but they also boast a rippling sensuality otherwise absent from his previous records".

== Track listing ==
1. "Till There Was You" (Meredith Willson) – 5:07
2. "You've Changed" (Carl Fischer, Bill Carey) – 5:53
3. "I Ain't Got Nobody" (Spencer Williams, Roger Graham) – 4:31
4. "Groovy Lady" (George Freeman) – 4:49
5. "Funny How Time Slips Away" (Willie Nelson) – 5:08
6. "Squeeze Me" (Fats Waller, Clarence Williams) – 6:04
7. "Stardust" (Hoagy Carmichael, Mitchell Parish) – 4:00
8. "Georgia on My Mind" (Carmichael, Stuart Gorrell) – 6:07

== Personnel ==
- George Freeman – guitar
- Harold Mabern Jr. − piano, electric piano
- Kenny Barron − electric piano
- Bobby Cranshaw – bass
- Buddy Williams (tracks 1–5 & 7), Bernard Trapps (tracks 6 & 8) – drums
