= But Beautiful (song) =

1947 song first recorded by Bing Crosby

Song by Bing Crosby
- Published: 1947
- Genre: Popular
- Composer: Jimmy Van Heusen
- Lyricist: Johnny Burke

"But Beautiful" is a popular song with music written by Jimmy Van Heusen, the lyrics by Johnny Burke. The song was published in 1947.

One of five songs written by Burke and Van Heusen featured in the Paramount Pictures movie Road to Rio (1947), it was introduced by Bing Crosby and is also associated with his leading lady Dorothy Lamour. The song was a hit in 1948 for Frank Sinatra (reaching the No. 14 spot), Bing Crosby (#20), Margaret Whiting (#21), and Art Lund (#25).

The original key is G major and has the form A-B1-A-B2. Chick Corea recorded a piano solo version of it in the original key of G major, but it has been recorded in many different keys, including F major (later Sinatra), C major (Bill Evans and Stan Getz), D major (Tony Bennett and Lady Gaga), Billie Holiday (B-flat major), and Nat King Cole (E major). It is usually performed as a ballad.

== Other versions ==
- Tex Beneke released a version in 1947 with Garry Stevens on vocal
- Tony Bennett on his first album with the jazz pianist Bill Evans – The Tony Bennett/Bill Evans Album (1975)
- Royce Campbell on his CD, Plays for Lovers
- The Coasters on their album One by One (1960)
- Alma Cogan – With You in Mind (1962)
- Nat King Cole on his album The Very Thought of You (1958)
- Shawn Colvin sang the song for AT&T's concert for the benefit of the Walden Woods Project and The Thoreau Institute at Walden Woods, which was released on the album Stormy Weather (1998)
- Chick Corea on his albums, Solo Piano – Standards (2000) and Trilogy 2
- Doris Day released a version in 1957 on her Day by Day album (Columbia Records CL-942) Recorded September 17–20, 1956, conducted by Paul Weston
- Bob Dylan – Triplicate (2017)
- Jazz pianist Eliane Elias included the composition in her 2008 album Something for You: Eliane Elias Sings & Plays Bill Evans
- In 1996, an album titled But Beautiful was released that featured live recordings by Bill Evans and Stan Getz made in 1974. The album includes a version of the Burke/Van Heusen standard.
- Bill Evans has recorded also the song on the albums Homecoming (1979) and Getting Sentimental (1978)
- Aretha Franklin on her album Soft and Beautiful (1969)
- The Four Freshmen on their album Voices in Latin/The Freshman Year (2001)
- Lady Gaga and Tony Bennett covered this song on their jazz album Cheek to Cheek (2014)
- Stan Getz and Kenny Barron performed a notable rendition at Umbria Jazz Festival in 1989
- Johnny Hartman recorded the song for his 1959 album, And I Thought About You
- Billie Holiday on her album Lady in Satin (1958)
- Shirley Horn recorded the song for her 1989 Verve album, Close Enough For Love
- Freddie Hubbard recorded the song for his album Open Sesame (1960)
- Engelbert Humperdinck included the song on his album A Lovely Way to Spend an Evening (1985)
- Linda Lawson on her album Introducing Linda Lawson (1960)
- Seth MacFarlane – In Full Swing
- Carmen McRae on her album Torchy! (1956)
- Mike Moreno recorded a version for his 2011 album First in Mind
- Gregory Porter, jazz singer, recorded the song on his 2010 album Water
- Della Reese recorded "But Beautiful" in the recording of her album Della Reese Live in Hollywood in 1966
- German jazz and pop artist Marc Secara recorded the song on the CD You're Everything (2008)
- Barbra Streisand on her album The Movie Album (2003)
- Nancy Wilson on her album But Beautiful (1971)
- Lorez Alexandria led off her album More of the Great Lorez Alexandria (1964) with her rendition of the song
- Samara Joy included the tune as the last track on her eponymously named 2021 album
- Diana Krall on her album This Dream of You (2020)
- Carmen McRae & Betty Carter "But Beautiful" (Live At The Great American Music Hall, San Francisco) (1987)
- Laufey as part of the A Big, Bold Beautiful Journey (2025) soundtrack
