= Soul Power! =

Studio album by Richard "Groove" Holmes
- Released: 1968
- Recorded: December 19, 1967
- Studio: Van Gelder Studio, Englewood Cliffs, New Jersey
- Genre: Jazz
- Length: 40:35
- Label: Prestige; PR 7543
- Producer: Cal Lampley

Richard "Groove" Holmes chronology
Get Up & Get It! (1967)	Soul Power! (1968)	The Groover! (1968)

Soul Power! is an album by jazz organist Richard "Groove" Holmes, which was recorded in 1967 and released on the Prestige label.

== Reception ==
Professional ratings
Review scores
Source	Rating
Allmusic	3.5/5 stars

Allmusic awarded the album three and a half stars, stating, "It's relaxed and funky, organ-paced small-combo music, Holmes perhaps breaking out less of a sweat than some of his more bop-influenced and frenetic contemporaries."

== Track listing ==
1. "Soul Power" (Richard "Groove" Holmes) - 5:50
2. "Gimme Little Sign" (Jerry Winn, Alfred Smith, Joe Hooven) - 2:30
3. "How Can I Be Sure" (Eddie Brigati, Felix Cavaliere) - 5:00
4. "Sunny" (Bobby Hebb) - 5:35
5. "Since I Fell for You" (Buddy Johnson) - 8:25
6. "The Preacher" (Horace Silver) - 7:15
7. "Girl Talk" (Neal Hefti, Bobby Troup) - 5:50

== Personnel ==
- Richard "Groove" Holmes - organ
- Wally Richardson, Steve Wolfe - guitar
- Jimmy Lewis - electric bass
- Ben Dixon - drums
- Dave Blume - congas
