= After Hours (Richard Holmes album) =

Studio album by Richard Holmes
- Released: 1962
- Recorded: 1961 and 1962
- Studio: Pacific Jazz Studios, Los Angeles, CA
- Genre: Jazz
- Label: Pacific Jazz; PJ 59
- Producer: Richard Bock

Richard "Groove" Holmes chronology
Somethin' Special (1962)	After Hours (1962)	Tell It Like It Tis (1966)

After Hours is an album led by organist Richard "Groove" Holmes recorded in 1961 and 1962 and released on the Pacific Jazz label.

== Reception ==
Professional ratings
Review scores
Source	Rating
AllMusic	4.5/5 stars

The Allmusic review by Scott Yanow calls it: "a strong sampling of the organist's talents on a variety of blues, bop standards, and obscure originals".

== Track listing ==
All compositions by Richard Holmes except as indicated

1. "Hallelujah I Love Her So" (Ray Charles) - 2:30
2. "After Hours" (Avery Parrish) - 5:25
3. "Groove's Bag" - 6:45
4. "Sweatin'" - 3:35
5. "Groove Bird" - 5:32
6. "Minor Surgery" - 4:13
7. "Do It My Way" - 4:55
8. "Jeannine" (Duke Pearson) - 2:54
- Recorded at Pacific Jazz Studios in Hollywood, CA in 1961 (tracks 1, 2 & 7) and 1962 (tracks 3−6 & 8).

== Personnel ==
- Richard "Groove" Holmes - organ
- Gene Edwards (tracks 1, 2 & 7), Joe Pass (tracks 3−6 & 8) - guitar
- Leroy Henderson (tracks 1, 2 & 7), Lawrence Marable (tracks 3−6 & 8) - drums
