= Soul Message =

Studio album by Richard "Groove" Holmes
- Released: January 1966
- Recorded: August 3, 1965
- Studios: Van Gelder Studio, Englewood Cliffs, New Jersey
- Genre: Jazz
- Length: 34:33
- Labels: Prestige; PR 7435
- Producer: Cal Lampley

Richard "Groove" Holmes chronology
Book of the Blues Vol. 1 (1964)	Soul Message (1966)	Living Soul (1966)

Soul Message is an album by jazz organist Richard "Groove" Holmes which was recorded in 1965 and released on the Prestige label.

== Reception ==
Professional ratings
Review scores
Source	Rating
Allmusic	4.5/5 stars
The Rolling Stone Jazz Record Guide	3/5 stars
The Penguin Guide to Jazz Recordings	3/4 stars

Allmusic awarded the album 4½ stars stating "Organist Richard "Groove" Holmes hit upon a successful formula on this Prestige session mixing together boogaloo rhythms with emotional solos... Groove Holmes shows that it is possible to create music that is both worthwhile and commercially successful".

== Track listing ==
All compositions by Richard "Groove" Holmes except as noted

1. "Groove's Groove" - 7:06
2. "Daahoud" (Clifford Brown) - 5:41
3. "Misty" (Johnny Burke, Erroll Garner) - 6:03
4. "Song for My Father" (Horace Silver) - 6:08
5. "The Things We Did Last Summer" (Sammy Cahn, Jule Styne) - 6:06
6. "Soul Message" - 3:25

== Personnel ==
- Richard "Groove" Holmes - organ
- Gene Edwards - guitar
- Jimmie Smith - drums
