= Soul Mist! =

Studio album by Richard "Groove" Holmes
- Released: 1970
- Recorded: March 15, 1966 and July 7, 1966
- Studio: Van Gelder Studio, Englewood Cliffs, New Jersey
- Genre: Jazz
- Length: 31:37
- Label: Prestige; PR 7741
- Producer: Cal Lampley

Richard "Groove" Holmes chronology
Living Soul (1966)	Soul Mist! (1970)	Misty (1965-66)

Soul Mist! is an album by jazz organist Richard "Groove" Holmes which was recorded in 1966 but not released on the Prestige label until 1970.

== Reception ==
Professional ratings
Review scores
Source	Rating
Allmusic	4/5 stars

Allmusic awarded the album 4 stars stating "A standards-heavy date, 1966's Soul Mist is one of Richard "Groove" Holmes' most relaxed and swinging discs... An often-overlooked gem in Richard "Groove" Holmes' extensive catalog, Soul Mist is well worth seeking out".

== Track listing ==
1. "Autumn Leaves" (Joseph Kosma, Johnny Mercer, Jacques Prévert) - 4:45
2. "There Is No Greater Love" (Isham Jones, Marty Symes) - 6:45
3. "Denise" (Richard "Groove" Holmes) - 5:27
4. "Things Ain't What They Used to Be" (Mercer Ellington, Ted Persons) - 7:50
5. "Up Jumped Spring" (Freddie Hubbard) - 6:50
- Recorded at Van Gelder Studio in Englewood Cliffs, New Jersey on March 15, 1966 (tracks 3 & 5) and July 7, 1966 (tracks 1, 2 & 4)

== Personnel ==
- Richard "Groove" Holmes - organ
- Blue Mitchell - trumpet (tracks 2 & 4)
- Harold Vick - tenor saxophone (tracks 2 & 4)
- Gene Edwards - guitar
- George Randall (tracks 1, 2 & 4), Freddie Waits (tracks 3 & 5) - drums.
