= Deep Roots (Lorez Alexandria album) =

Studio album by Lorez Alexandria
- Released: 1962
- Recorded: February 13–14, 1962
- Studio: Ter-Mar Recording Studios, Chicago, IL
- Genre: Jazz
- Length: 27:18
- Label: Argo; LP/LPS-694
- Producer: Ralph Bass

Lorez Alexandria chronology
Sing No Sad Songs for Me (1961)	Deep Roots (1962)	For Swingers Only (1963)

Deep Roots is an album by American jazz vocalist Lorez Alexandria featuring performances recorded in 1960 and released on the Argo label.

== Critical reception ==
Professional ratings
Review scores
Source	Rating
AllMusic	4/5 stars

AllMusic reviewer Thom Jurek stated "it was recorded with a killer group ... The material is made up mostly of standards ... in her signature style".

== Track listing ==
1. "Nature Boy" (eden ahbez) – 2:49
2. "I Was a Fool" (Johnny Pate) – 3:23
3. "No Moon at All" (David Mann, Redd Evans) – 2:11
4. "Spring Will Be a Little Late This Year" (Frank Loesser) – 3:03
5. "Softly, as in a Morning Sunrise" (Sigmund Romberg, Oscar Hammerstein II) – 2:36
6. "Detour Ahead" (Herb Ellis, Johnny Frigo, Lou Carter) – 3:39
7. "It Could Happen to You" (Jimmy Van Heusen, Johnny Burke) – 2:45
8. "Trav'lin' Light" (Trummy Young, Jimmy Mundy, Johnny Mercer) – 3:27
9. "Almost Like Being in Love" (Frederick Loewe, Alan Jay Lerner) – 2:22
10. "I Want to Talk About You" (Billy Eckstine) – 2:53

== Personnel ==
- Lorez Alexandria – vocals
- Howard McGhee – trumpet
- John Young – piano, arranger
- George Eskridge – guitar
- Israel Crosby – bass
- Vernel Fournier – drums
