= Ray Crawford =

Ray Crawford may refer to:

- Ray Crawford (racing driver) (1915–1996), American race-car driver, test pilot, businessman
- Ray Crawford (footballer) (born 1936), British football player
- Ray Crawford (musician) (1924–1997), American guitarist
