= Birth Sign (album) =

Studio album by George Freeman
- Released: 1970
- Recorded: March 11 & 12, 1969
- Studio: Ter-Mar Recording Studio, Chicago
- Genre: Jazz
- Length: 40:11
- Label: Delmark; DS-424
- Producer: Robert G. Koester

George Freeman chronology
Birth Sign (1970)	Introducing George Freeman Live (1971)

Birth Sign is the debut album by the American jazz guitarist George Freeman recorded in 1969 and released by the Delmark label.

== Reception ==
Professional ratings
Review scores
Source	Rating
Allmusic	3.5/5 stars
The Penguin Guide to Jazz Recordings	3/4 stars

Allmusic reviewer Michael G. Nastos stated "Chicago electric guitarist George Freeman was a quintessential sideman ... This is his debut recording, done in the height of the soul-jazz era circa 1969 ... At times Freeman's sound traces to no single individual source, though it is steeped in Chi-Town blues and a progressive stance ... Too bad the world never really heard enough of George Freeman, and although this is a small taste, it is a more than adequate amuse-bouche".

== Track listing ==
All compositions by George Freeman except where noted

1. "Mama, Papa, Brother" – 5:39
2. "Cough It Up" – 4:03
3. "My Scenery" – 5:54
4. "Must Be, Must Be" (Robin Kenyatta) – 5:30
5. "Birth Sign" – 5:23
6. "Hoss" – 6:57
7. "My Ship" (Kurt Weill, Ira Gershwin) – 6:45

== Personnel ==
- George Freeman – guitar
- Lester Lashley – trombone (track 4)
- Von Freeman (tracks 2, 3, 6 & 7), Kalaparusha Maurice McIntyre (track 4) – tenor saxophone
- Sonny Burke (tracks 1–3 & 4–6), Robert Pierce (track 4) – organ
- Billy Mitchell – drums
- Michael Cuscuna – arranger (track 4)
