= Groove (Richard "Groove" Holmes album) =

Studio album by Richard "Groove" Holmes with Les McCann and Ben Webster
- Released: 1961
- Recorded: March 1961
- Studio: Pacific Jazz Studios, Los Angeles, CA
- Genre: Jazz
- Length: 33:17
- Label: Pacific Jazz; PJ 23
- Producer: Richard Bock

Richard "Groove" Holmes chronology
"Groove" (1961)	Groovin' with Jug (1961)

Les McCann chronology
From the Top of the Barrel (1960)	Groove (1961)	Pretty Lady (1961)

"Groove" (full title Les McCann Presents the Dynamic Jazz Organ of Richard "Groove" Holmes with Ben Webster, Les McCann, Tricky Lofton, Ron Jefferson & George Freeman) is the debut led by organist Richard "Groove" Holmes recorded in 1961 and released on the Pacific Jazz label.

== Reception ==
Professional ratings
Review scores
Source	Rating
Allmusic	4/5 stars

The Allmusic review by Scott Yanow states: "the result is a loose, enjoyable jam session. In addition to Holmes' appealing organ and McCann's typically funky piano, a major bonus is the brilliant playing of tenor saxophonist Ben Webster, whose tone was at its most gorgeous during this period".

== Track listing ==
1. "Them That's Got" (Ricci Harper, Ray Charles) − 6:20
2. "That Healin' Feelin'" (Les McCann) − 5:35
3. "Seven Come Eleven" (Charlie Christian, Benny Goodman) – 4:03
4. "Deep Purple" (Peter DeRose, Mitchell Parish) − 9:09
5. "Good Groove" (Richard Holmes) − 8:10

== Personnel ==
- Richard "Groove" Holmes - organ
- Les McCann - piano
- Ben Webster - tenor saxophone
- Lawrence "Tricky" Lofton - trombone
- George Freeman - guitar
- Ron Jefferson - drums
