= New Improved Funk =

Studio album by George Freeman featuring Von Freeman
- Released: 1973
- Recorded: 1973
- Studio: New York City, NY
- Genre: Jazz
- Length: 39:10
- Label: Groove Merchant; GM 519
- Producer: Sonny Lester

George Freeman chronology
Franticdiagnosis (1972)	New Improved Funk (1973)	Man & Woman (1974)

New Improved Funk is an album by American jazz guitarist George Freeman recorded in 1973 and released on the Groove Merchant label.

== Reception ==
Professional ratings
Review scores
Source	Rating
Allmusic	3.5/5 stars

Allmusic's Jason Ankeny said: "It's a fun house ride that veers sharply from funk to jazz to soul and back again, its scattershot approach nevertheless proves the best showcase George Freeman's guitar ever had. ... Somehow this mess still comes together, galvanized by Von Freeman's fiery tenor sax and its undeniably impressive gutbucket grooves. Everything that it's advertised to be".

== Track listing ==
All compositions by George Freeman except where noted.

1. "New Improved Funk" – 2:26
2. "Daffy" – 3:34
3. "Happy Fingers" – 4:30
4. "All in the Game" (Charles G. Dawes, Carl Sigman) – 4:31
5. "Big Finish" – 6:25
6. "Guitar Lover Man" – 3:16
7. "Good Morning Heartache" (Irene Higginbotham, Ervin Drake, Dan Fisher) – 5:02
8. "Some Enchanted Evening" (Richard Rodgers, Oscar Hammerstein II) – 5:12
9. "Confirmed Truth" – 4:14

== Personnel ==
- George Freeman – guitar
- Von Freeman – tenor saxophone
- John Young − piano (tracks 3–5)
- Bobby Blevins – organ (tracks 1, 2 & 6–8)
- LeRoy Jackson – bass
- Marion Booker (tracks 1, 2 & 6–8), Bob Guthrie (tracks 3–5) – drums
