= Welcome Home (Richard "Groove" Holmes album) =

Studio album by Richard "Groove" Holmes
- Released: 1968
- Recorded: 1968
- Genre: Jazz
- Label: World Pacific; PJS 20147
- Producer: Richard Bock

Richard "Groove" Holmes chronology
That Healin' Feelin' (1968)	Welcome Home (1968)	Workin' on a Groovy Thing (1969)

Welcome Home is an album by jazz organist Richard "Groove" Holmes which was recorded in 1968 and released on the World Pacific label.

== Track listing ==
1. "Groovin' Time" (Richard "Groove" Holmes) - 7:20
2. "Oklahoma Toad" (Dave Frishberg) - 2:11
3. "Upward Bound" (Joe Sample) - 4:56
4. "The Madison Time" (Eddie Morrison, Ray Bryant) - 5:35
5. "The Odd Couple" (Neal Hefti, Sammy Cahn) - 2:45
6. "I'm in the Mood for Love" (Dorothy Fields, Jimmy McHugh) - 2:46
7. "98.6 - Lazy Day" (George Fischoff, Tony Powers) - 2:26
8. "Sunday Mornin'" (Margo Guryan) - 2:27

== Personnel ==
- Richard "Groove" Holmes - organ
- Chuck Findley - trumpet
- Anthony Ortega, Tom Scott - alto saxophone
- Teddy Edwards - tenor saxophone
- Wilton Felder - baritone saxophone, electric bass
- Joe Sample - piano
- George Freeman, Michael Anthony - guitar
- Paul Humphrey - drums
