= Shippin' Out =

Studio album by Groove Holmes
- Released: 1978
- Recorded: June 1977
- Studios: Van Gelder Studio, Englewood Cliffs, NJ
- Genre: Jazz
- Length: 38:38
- Labels: Muse; MR 5134
- Producer: Joe Fields

Groove Holmes chronology
| I'm in the Mood for Love (1976) | Shippin' Out (1978) | Good Vibrations (1978) |

Shippin' Out is an album by jazz organist Groove Holmes recorded in 1977 and released on the Groove Merchant label the following year.

== Reception ==
Professional ratings
Review scores
| Source | Rating |
|---|---|
| Allmusic | 3/5 stars |

Allmusic's Scott Yanow called it a "fine Muse LP, which would be followed by several other rewarding efforts" stating "Back in a comfortable setting, heading a soul-jazz quintet ... Holmes explores a wider range of songs than usual".

== Track listing ==
1. "Feelings" (Morris Albert) – 7:17
2. "Windows" (Chick Corea) – 6:38
3. "Stella by Starlight" (Victor Young, Ned Washington) – 5:28
4. "Where or When" (Richard Rodgers, Lorenz Hart) – 9:05
5. "Shippin' Out" (Grrove Holmes, David Schnitter) – 10:10

== Personnel ==
- Groove Holmes – organ
- David Schnitter − tenor saxophone
- Steve Giordano − guitar
- Idris Muhammad − drums
- Buddy Caldwell – congas
