= Living Soul =

Live album by Richard "Groove" Holmes
- Released: 1966
- Recorded: April 22, 1966; Count Basie's, New York City
- Genre: Jazz
- Length: 34:33
- Label: Prestige; PR 7468
- Producer: Cal Lampley

Richard "Groove" Holmes chronology
Soul Message (1965)	Living Soul (1966)	Soul Mist! (1966)

Living Soul is a live album by jazz organist Richard "Groove" Holmes which was recorded in New York in 1966 and released on the Prestige label.

== Reception ==
Professional ratings
Review scores
Source	Rating
Allmusic	3/5 stars

Allmusic awarded the album 3 stars stating "this is a decent trio set... The relative lack of original material and the selection of several kinda corny standards to cover holds this back from the upper echelon of Holmes' recordings".

== Track listing ==
All compositions by Richard "Groove" Holmes except as indicated

1. "Living Soul" - 8:30
2. "Blues for Yna Yna" (Gerald Wilson) - 5:12
3. "The Girl from Ipanema" (Norman Gimbel, Antônio Carlos Jobim, Vinícius de Moraes) - 5:00
4. "Gemini" (Jimmy Heath) - 9:40
5. "Over the Rainbow" (Harold Arlen, Yip Harburg) - 7:00

== Personnel ==
- Richard "Groove" Holmes - organ
- Gene Edwards - guitar
- George Randall - drums
