= Comin' On Home =

Studio album by Richard Groove Holmes
- Released: 1971
- Recorded: May 19, 1971
- Studio: Van Gelder Studio; Englewood Cliffs, NJ
- Genre: Jazz-funk
- Length: 35:37
- Label: Blue Note; BST 84732
- Producer: Dr. George Butler

Richard Groove Holmes chronology
| X-77 Recorded Live at the Lighthouse (1970) | Comin' On Home (1971) | American Pie (1972) |

Comin' On Home is an album by American organist Richard Groove Holmes recorded on May 19, 1971 and released on Blue Note—his sole release for the label.

== Reception ==
Professional ratings
Review scores
| Source | Rating |
|---|---|
| AllMusic | 3/5 stars |
| The Penguin Guide to Jazz Recordings | 2.5/4 stars |

The AllMusic review awarded the album 3 stars.

== Track listing ==
All tracks are written by Richard Groove Holmes, except as noted.

Side 1
| No. | Title | Writer(s) | Length |
|---|---|---|---|
| 1. | "Groovin' for Mr. G." | | 4:13 |
| 2. | "Theme from Love Story" | Francis Lai; Carl Sigman | 3:38 |
| 3. | "Mr. Clean" | Weldon Irvine | 5:04 |
| 4. | "Down Home Funk" | Irvine | 5:21 |

Side 2
| No. | Title | Writer(s) | Length |
|---|---|---|---|
| 1. | "Don't Mess with Me" | | 6:47 |
| 2. | "Wave" | Antônio Carlos Jobim | 5:48 |
| 3. | "This Here" | Bobby Timmons | 5:05 |

== Personnel ==
- Richard Groove Holmes – organ
- Gerald Hubbard – guitar
- Weldon Irvine – electric piano (except "Theme from Love Story")
- Jerry Jemmott (except "Theme from Love Story"), Chuck Rainey ("Theme from Love Story") – electric bass
- Darryl Washington – drums
- Ray Armando – conga (except "This Here")
- James Davis (except "Theme from Love Story") – tambourine, shaker, cowbell, voice
