= Misty (Richard "Groove" Holmes album) =

Studio album by Richard "Groove" Holmes
- Released: 1966
- Recorded: August 3, 1965, July 7, 1966 and August 12, 1966
- Studio: Van Gelder Studio, Englewood Cliffs, New Jersey
- Genre: Jazz
- Length: 37:20
- Label: Prestige; PR 7485
- Producer: Cal Lampley

Richard "Groove" Holmes chronology
| Soul Mist! (1966) | Misty (1966) | Spicy! (1966) |

Misty is an album by jazz organist Richard "Groove" Holmes which was recorded in 1966, with one track from 1965, and released on the Prestige label.

== Reception ==
Professional ratings
Review scores
| Source | Rating |
|---|---|
| Allmusic | 4/5 stars |
| The Rolling Stone Jazz Record Guide | 3/5 stars |
| The Penguin Guide to Jazz Recordings | 2/4 stars |

Allmusic awarded the album 4 stars stating "In the mid-'60s, organist Richard "Groove" Holmes had a hit with his medium-tempo rendition of "Misty." This CD reissue has the original short version (which was cut as a 45) plus other medium-tempo ballads performed in similar fashion... the organist's sound is more appealing than some of the tunes".

== Track listing ==
1. "The More I See You" (Mack Gordon, Harry Warren) - 2:24
2. "The Shadow of Your Smile" (Johnny Mandel, Paul Francis Webster) - 4:54
3. "What Now, My Love?" (Gilbert Bécaud, Pierre Delanoë, Carl Sigman) - 5:29
4. "Summertime" (George Gershwin, Ira Gershwin, DuBose Heyward) - 4:57
5. "Misty" (Johnny Burke, Erroll Garner) - 1:58
6. "On the Street Where You Live" (Alan Jay Lerner, Frederick Loewe) - 8:01
7. "Strangers in the Night" (Bert Kaempfert, Charles Singleton, Eddie Snyder) - 2:22
8. "There Will Never Be Another You" (Gordon, Warren) - 7:42
- Recorded at Van Gelder Studio in Englewood Cliffs, New Jersey on August 3, 1965 (track 5), July 7, 1966 (tracks 1−3) and August 12, 1966 (track 4 & 6−8)

== Personnel ==
- Richard "Groove" Holmes - organ
- Gene Edwards - guitar
- George Randall (tracks 1−4 & 6−8), Jimmie Smith (track 5) - drums
