= The Groover! =

Studio album by Richard "Groove" Holmes
- Released: 1968
- Recorded: February 14, 1968
- Studio: Van Gelder Studio, Englewood Cliffs, New Jersey
- Genre: Jazz
- Length: 36:22
- Label: Prestige; PR 7570
- Producer: Cal Lampley

Richard "Groove" Holmes chronology
Soul Power! (1967)	The Groover! (1968)	That Healin' Feelin' (1968)

The Groover! is an album by jazz organist Richard "Groove" Holmes which was recorded in 1968 and released on the Prestige label.

== Reception ==
Professional ratings
Review scores
Source	Rating
Allmusic	3/5 stars

Allmusic awarded the album 3 stars stating "Holmes acquits himself well, if with few surprises, on this trio session".

== Track listing ==
1. "Speak Low" (Ogden Nash, Kurt Weill) - 7:02
2. "Blue Moon" (Lorenz Hart, Richard Rodgers) - 5:05
3. "I'll Remember April" (Gene de Paul, Patricia Johnston, Don Raye) - 6:15
4. "The Walrus" (George Freeman) - 8:20
5. "Just Friends" (John Klenner, Sam M. Lewis) - 5:35
6. "My Scenery" (Freeman) - 4:05

== Personnel ==
- Richard "Groove" Holmes - organ
- George Freeman (tracks 1−2, 4 & 6) Earl Maddox (tracks 3 & 5) - guitar
- Billy Jackson - drums
