= For Swingers Only =

Studio album by Lorez Alexandria
- Released: 1963
- Recorded: January 2 & 3, 1963
- Studio: Ter Mar Recording Studios, Chicago, IL
- Genre: Jazz
- Length: 29:00
- Label: Argo; LP/LPS-720
- Producer: Esmond Edwards

Lorez Alexandria chronology
Deep Roots (1962)	For Swingers Only (1963)	Alexandria the Great (1964)

For Swingers Only is an album by American jazz/blues vocalist Lorez Alexandria released by the Argo label in 1963.

== Critical reception ==
Professional ratings
Review scores
Source	Rating
AllMusic	4/5 stars

AllMusic reviewer Thom Jurek stated "This is simply among Lorez Alexandria's most stylized, disciplined, soulful, and satisfying recording sessions, and is highly recommended".

== Track listing ==
1. "Baltimore Oriole" (Hoagy Carmichael, Paul Francis Webster) – 3:11
2. "Little Girl Blue" (Richard Rodgers, Lorenz Hart) – 3:34
3. "All or Nothing at All" (Arthur Altman, Jack Lawrence) – 4:55
4. "Traveling Down a Lonely Road" (Nino Rota, Michele Galdieri, Don Raye) – 3:45
5. "Mother Earth" (Peter Chatman) – 3:03
6. "Love Look Away" (Richard Rodgers, Oscar Hammerstein II) – 3:49
7. "The End of a Love Affair" (Edward C. Redding) – 2:49
8. "That Old Devil Called Love" (Alan Roberts, Doris Fisher) – 3:54

== Personnel ==
- Lorez Alexandria – vocals
- Ronald Wilson – tenor saxophone, flute
- John Young – piano, arranger
- George Eskridge – guitar
- Jimmy Garrison – bass
- Phil Thomas – drums
