= Early in the Morning (Lorez Alexandria album) =

1960 studio album by Lorez Alexandria

Studio album by Lorez Alexandria with the Ramsey Lewis Trio and Some of Basie's Cats
- Released: 1960
- Recorded: March 15, 16 & 17, 1960
- Studio: Ter-Mar Recording Studios, Chicago, IL
- Genre: Jazz
- Length: 29:06
- Label: Argo; LP/LPS-663
- Producer: Ralph Bass

Lorez Alexandria chronology
Standards with a Slight Touch of Jazz (1960)	Early in the Morning (1960)	Sing No Sad Songs for Me (1961)

Early in the Morning is an album by American jazz vocalist Lorez Alexandria featuring performances recorded in 1960 and released on the Argo label.

== Critical reception ==
Professional ratings
Review scores
Source	Rating
AllMusic	4/5 stars

AllMusic reviewer Thom Jurek stated "Ultimately, Early in the Morning is the most sophisticated kind of blues recording. The musical arrangements are both groove-laden and wonderfully impressionistic, allowing Alexandria's unusual delivery line plenty of space to play".

== Track listing ==
1. "Early in the Morning" (Louis Jordan, Dallas Bartley, Leo Hickman) – 2:58
2. "Don't Explain" (Billie Holiday, Arthur Herzog Jr.) – 3:13
3. "So Long" (Remus Harris, Russ Morgan, Irving Melsher) – 3:28
4. "Good Morning Heartache" (Irene Higginbotham, Ervin Drake, Dan Fisher) – 3:19
5. "Trouble Is a Man" (Alec Wilder) – 2:44
6. "I Ain't Got Nothin' but the Blues (Duke Ellington, Don George) – 2:22
7. "Baby Don't You Cry" (Buddy Johnson) – 2:15
8. "Rocks in My Bed" (Ellington) – 2:42
9. "I'm Just a Lucky So-and-So" (Ellington, Mack David) – 3:02
10. "I Almost Lost My Mind" (Ivory Joe Hunter) – 3:03

== Personnel ==
- Lorez Alexandria – vocals

Tracks 1–10:

- Ramsey Lewis – piano
- Eldee Young – bass
- Red Holt – drums
- Johnny Gray – guitar

Tracks 6–10:

- Frank Foster – tenor saxophone, arranger
- Joe Newman – trumpet
- Al Grey – trombone
- Frank Wess – flute, tenor saxophone
- Freddie Green – rhythm guitar
- Kirk Stuart – arranger (tracks 1–5)
