= Spicy! =

Studio album by Richard "Groove" Holmes
- Released: 1967
- Recorded: November 28, 1966
- Studio: Van Gelder Studio, Englewood Cliffs, New Jersey
- Genre: Jazz
- Length: 40:32
- Label: Prestige; PR 7493
- Producer: Cal Lampley

Richard "Groove" Holmes chronology
Misty (1965-66)	Spicy! (1967)	Get Up & Get It! (1967)

Spicy! is an album by jazz organist Richard "Groove" Holmes which was recorded in 1966 and released on the Prestige label.

== Reception ==
Professional ratings
Review scores
Source	Rating
Allmusic	3/5 stars

Allmusic awarded the album 3 stars stating "Although this is dependable B-3 Hammond soul-jazz, some of the songs selected for this set, such as "If I Had a Hammer" and "Never on Sunday," are inappropriate for soul-jazz translation. On the other hand, the adaptation of Luiz Bonfá's "Manhã de Carnaval" is good, and Nat Adderley's "Work Song" is a classic that's hard to mess up".

== Track listing ==
1. "If I Had a Hammer" (Lee Hays, Pete Seeger) - 4:30
2. "Never on Sunday" (Manos Hadjidakis, Billy Towne) - 2:35
3. "A Day in the Life of a Fool" [AKA "Manhã de Carnaval"] (Luiz Bonfá, Antônio Maria) - 5:34
4. "1-2-3" (John Madara, David White, Len Barry) - 4:00
5. "Boo-D-Doo" (Richard "Groove" Holmes) - 3:30
6. "Work Song" (Nat Adderley) - 6:05
7. "When Lights Are Low" (Benny Carter, Spencer Williams) - 5:53
8. "Old Folks" (Dedette Lee Hill, Willard Robison) - 8:25

== Personnel ==
- Richard "Groove" Holmes - organ
- Gene Edwards, Joe Jones - guitar
- George Randall - drums
- Richie Landrum - congas
