= Pretty Lady (album) =

Studio album by Les McCann Ltd.
- Released: 1961
- Recorded: March 13 & 15, 1961; Rex Productions Studio, Hollywood, CA
- Genre: Jazz
- Length: 34:50
- Label: Pacific Jazz; PJ 31
- Producer: Richard Bock

Les McCann chronology
"Groove" (1961)	Pretty Lady (1961)	Les McCann Sings (1961)

Pretty Lady is an album by pianist Les McCann recorded in 1961 and released on the Pacific Jazz label.

== Reception ==
Professional ratings
Review scores
Source	Rating
Allmusic	4/5 stars

Allmusic gives the album 4 stars.

== Track listing ==
All compositions by Les McCann except as indicated

1. "Django" (John Lewis) - 5:10
2. "Dorene Don't Cry, I" - 5:16
3. "Pretty Lady" - 4:42
4. "Stella By Starlight" (Victor Young, Ned Washington) - 5:38
5. "On Green Dolphin Street" (Bronisław Kaper, Washington) - 6:38
6. "I'll Take Romance" (Ben Oakland, Oscar Hammerstein II) - 6:12
7. "Little Girl Blue" (Richard Rodgers, Lorenz Hart) - 7:15

== Personnel ==
- Les McCann - piano
- Herbie Lewis - bass
- Ron Jefferson - drums
