= The Band Swings – Lorez Sings =

Studio album by Lorez Alexandria
- Released: 1959
- Recorded: February 1959
- Studio: Chicago, Illinois
- Genre: Jazz
- Length: 26:55
- Label: King; King 657

Lorez Alexandria chronology
Lorez Sings Pres: A Tribute to Lester Young (1957)	The Band Swings – Lorez Sings (1959)	Standards with a Slight Touch of Jazz (1960)

The Band Swings – Lorez Sings is an album by American jazz vocalist Lorez Alexandria released by the King label in 1959.

== Critical reception ==
Professional ratings
Review scores
Source	Rating
AllMusic	3/5 stars

AllMusic reviewer Ron Wynn said: "Decent set featuring the highly stylized, often erratic vocalist Lorez Alexandria doing conventional jazz and jazz-centered pop tunes and standards. She's backed by a capable band, and sometimes has some brilliant moments, but overall, Alexandria was an average vocalist."

== Track listing ==
1. "You're My Thrill" (Jay Gorney, Sidney Clare) – 2:06
2. "Don't Blame Me" (Jimmy McHugh, Dorothy Fields) – 2:34
3. "Ain't Misbehavin'" (Fats Waller, Andy Razaf, Harry Brooks) – 2:49
4. "What Is This Thing Called Love?" (Cole Porter) – 3:01
5. "Dancing on the Ceiling" (Richard Rodgers, Lorenz Hart) – 3:04
6. "Love Is Just Around the Corner" (Lewis E. Gensler, Leo Robin) – 2:23
7. "I'm Gonna Sit Right Down and Write Myself a Letter" (Fred E. Ahlert, Joe Young) – 2:05
8. "Just You, Just Me" (Jesse Greer, Raymond Klages) – 2:17
9. "All the Things You Are" (Jerome Kern, Oscar Hammerstein II) – 1:47
10. "The Thrill Is Gone" (Ray Henderson, Lew Brown) – 2:15
11. "My Baby Just Cares for Me" (Walter Donaldson, Gus Kahn) – 2:34

== Personnel ==
- Lorez Alexandria – vocals
- Unidentified musicians
