= Tell It Like It Tis =

Studio album by Richard "Groove" Holmes
- Released: 1966
- Recorded: March 1961, August 15, 1961 and 1962
- Studio: Pacific Jazz Studios, The Black Orchid and other unidentified studio(s), Los Angeles, CA
- Genre: Jazz
- Length: 40:18
- Label: Pacific Jazz; PJ 10105
- Producer: Richard Bock

Richard "Groove" Holmes chronology
After Hours (1961-62)	Tell It Like It Tis (1966)	Book of the Blues Vol. 1 (1964)

Tell It Like It Tis is an album led by organist Richard "Groove" Holmes recorded in 1961 and 1962 and released on the Pacific Jazz label in 1966.

== Reception ==
Professional ratings
Review scores
Source	Rating
Allmusic	3/5 stars

The Allmusic review by Michael Erlewine states: "this is classy soul jazz".

== Track listing ==
1. "Hittin' the Jug" (Gene Ammons) - 7:15
2. "Blow the Man Down" (Traditional) - 5:38
3. "Denice" (Richard "Groove" Holmes) - 3:18
4. "Later" (Sil Austin, Tiny Bradshaw, Henry Glover) - 4:32
5. "This Here" (Bobby Timmons, Bob Dorough) - 3:30
6. "Secret Love" (Sammy Fain, Paul Francis Webster) - 6:35
7. "It Might as Well Be Spring" (Richard Rodgers, Oscar Hammerstein II) - 5:15
8. "Licks A Plenty" (Eddie "Lockjaw" Davis) - 4:05
- Recorded at Pacific Jazz Studios in Hollywood, CA in March, 1961 (track 8), The Black Orchid in Los Angeles, CA, on August 15, 1961 (track 1), unidentified studios in Los Angeles, CA in 1961 (tracks 2−4 & 6) and 1962 (tracks 5 & 7).

== Personnel ==
- Richard "Groove" Holmes - organ
- Tricky Lofton - trombone (track 8)
- Gene Ammons (track 1), Ben Webster (track 8) - tenor saxophone
- Les McCann - piano (track 8)
- Gene Edwards (tracks 1−4 & 6), George Freeman (track 8), Joe Pass (tracks 5 & 7) - guitar
- Leroy Henderson (tracks 1−4 & 6), Ron Jefferson (track 8), Lawrence Marable (tracks 5 & 7) - drums
