= George Freeman (guitarist) =

American jazz guitarist from Chicago (1927–2025)

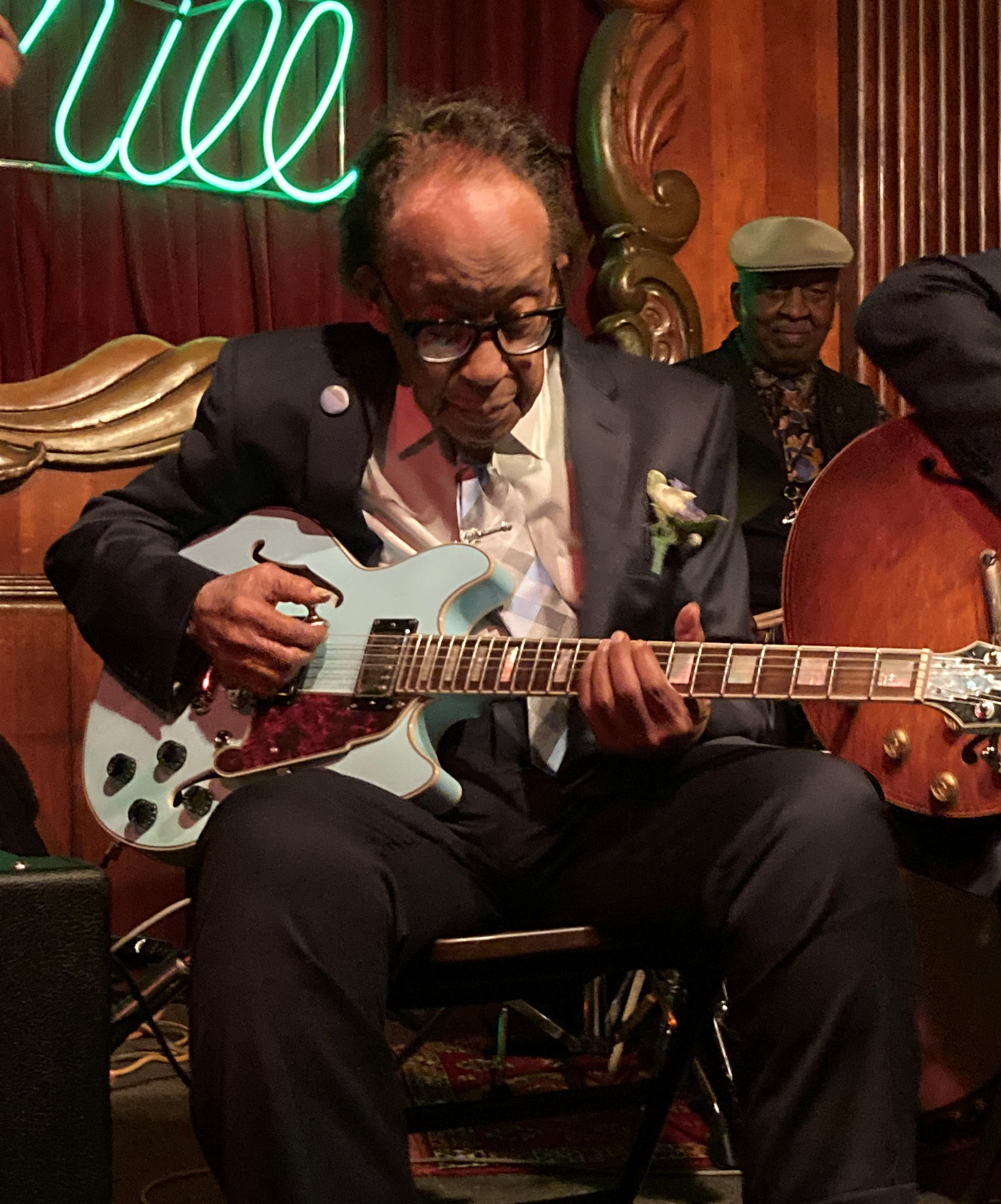
- Freeman at the Green Mill Cocktail Lounge, Chicago in 2023

Background information
- Born: April 10, 1927; Chicago, Illinois, U.S.
- Died: April 1, 2025 (aged 97)
- Genres: Jazz; soul jazz
- Occupation: Musician
- Instrument: Guitar
- Years active: 1940s–2025

George Freeman (April 10, 1927 – April 1, 2025) was an American jazz guitarist and recording artist. He is known for his sophisticated technique, collaborations with high-profile performers, and as having been a notable presence in the jazz scene of Chicago, Illinois. He was the younger brother of tenor saxophonist Von Freeman and drummer Eldridge "Bruz" Freeman, and the uncle of tenor saxophonist and trumpeter Chico Freeman.

== Early life ==
Freeman was born on April 10, 1927, in Chicago, Illinois. His parents were amateur musicians—his father a trombonist and his mother a guitarist and singer. His father, George Sr., was a Chicago police officer who regularly befriended musicians at the South Side clubs on his beat, most notably the Grand Terrace Ballroom. As a result, Louis Armstrong, Earl Hines, Fats Waller, and other foundational jazz musicians frequently visited the Freeman home.

Freeman's siblings went on to become professional musicians. Bruz played drums, and Von the tenor saxophone. Freeman himself would come to play the guitar, inspired by his visits as a teenager to the Rhumboogie Cafe in the early 1940s. There, he saw T-Bone Walker play, and the crowd's ecstatic response to Walker motivated him to learn the guitar.

Wind players such as Von and later Charlie Parker informed Freeman's basic approach to music. He further refined his skills while attending DuSable High School, whose students included Von, Gene Ammons, Johnny Griffin, Red Holloway, Clifford Jordan, John Gilmore, Wilbur Ware, Dinah Washington, Sonny Cohn, Richard Davis, and other musicians.

== Career ==
During his teenage years, Freeman was invited to play with The Dukes of Swing, a band led by Eugene Wright. Shortly after, wanting more opportunities to solo, Freeman started his own band, performing mainly at the ballroom of the Pershing Hotel at 64th and Cottage Grove. By 1946 Freeman was fronting Chicago's first modern-jazz bebop band, a band that included alto saxophonist Henry Pryor, tenor saxophonist Alec Johnson, and trumpeter Robert Gay. Freeman-led bands also backed visiting musicians such as Coleman Hawkins and Lester Young. During the engagement with Young, the saxophonist called for his recently recorded song D.B. Blues. In response, Freeman surprised Young by playing his solo note-for-note, a custom Freeman had previously cultivated with his Chicago audience.

=== 1947–1949: New York City ===
In 1947, shortly after his 20th birthday, Freeman traveled to New York with Johnny Griffin – a high school friend who previously had left Chicago to tour with the Lionel Hampton band – to join the band he was forming with trumpeter Joe Morris. Over the next year, Freeman met and listened to notable artists in the bebop genre. He also gave a solo guitar concert in Philadelphia for an audience consisting of a young Fats Navarro and John Coltrane.

Freeman made his first recordings with the Joe Morris Orchestra in late 1947, first on the Manor label, and then on the fledgling Atlantic label. The band's sound was a blend of R&B and jazz, which contrasted with Freeman's more eccentric, bebop-inspired style of playing. His extended solo feature on Boogie Woogie Joe, recorded in late 1947, has been described by one rock music writer as "...the first scintillating guitar workout in rock history."

In December 1947, the Morris band recorded a song based on The Hulk, a blues composed by Freeman. For the Atlantic recording, it was renamed Lowe Groovin' , a title derived from the name of a Washington, D.C., disk jockey named Jackson Lowe. When the record came out in 1948, the composition was credited on the label to Morris, not Freeman. Freeman quit the band and returned to Chicago in response.

=== 1950–1959: Collaborations with Charlie Parker and others ===
Upon his return, Freeman re-assumed his place in the Chicago music scene, often performing with his brothers at the Pershing Hotel. Highlights of this period were collaborations with Charlie Parker – twice in Chicago and once in Detroit – between 1950 and 1953. During these performances, Parker developed a close musical and personal rapport with the Freemans. At one engagement, Von took George's tie and lent it to Parker. Parker never returned it and subsequently wore it in publicity photos, including one on the wall behind the stage at The Jazz Showcase in Chicago. At another point, as a set was scheduled to begin while Freeman was still backstage, Parker rejected the pleas of the audience to start: "No, I'm not going to play anything until George gets back."

An amateur recording of the Parker-Freeman performances in Chicago has been reissued multiple times. In a 2003 release, music historian and annotator Loren Schoenberg said this about Freeman's playing: "There is virtually no precedent for the outrageously experimental music that George Freeman creates throughout this set.... His ... solo [on one tune] is unlike anything I have ever heard, and seems much closer to what John Scofield and Bill Frisell have brought to the jazz guitar in the '90s than to anything from his own contemporaries."

Freeman remained in Chicago throughout the 1950s, but by 1959 he decided to tour again. He traveled the country with tenor saxophonist Sil Austin and vocalist Jackie Wilson, then with organist Wild Bill Davis, and finally with organist Richard "Groove" Holmes.

=== 1960–1979: Tours with Groove Holmes and Gene Ammons ===
Freeman spent most of the 1960s touring with Holmes. Freeman also was featured on Holmes' first record, Groove, alongside tenor saxophone player Ben Webster. Another recording highlight with Holmes was The Groover!, which features Freeman's guitar work along with two of his own compositions.

In 1969, tenor saxophonist Gene Ammons, having been released from incarceration on drug charges, returned to Chicago and performed with old colleagues and high school classmates, including Freeman. After their performances, Ammons asked Freeman to join him on the front line of a band he was forming. Freeman accepted and would remain a featured member of the Ammons band, with a few interruptions, until Ammons' death from bone cancer in 1974.

The Ammons-Freeman collaboration yielded several recordings, including The Black Cat, the title track of which was written by Freeman. Ammons' admiration for Freeman's playing is revealed in a Down Beat interview conducted by jazz writer Leonard Feather. Ammons expressed a dislike for avant garde jazz music, and in response, Feather countered that Freeman's solos often fell into that category. Ammons responded: "I agree. But George does it in the realm of what's going on otherwise, as far as the rest of the rhythm and the whole situation, and it sounds good."

Freeman's work during the Ammons years garnered acclaim. A 1971 Down Beat issue, entitled Masters of Jazz Guitar, showcased Freeman's work along with that of Kenny Burrell and Jim Hall. Other bandleaders who recognized Freeman's talents tried to pry him away from Ammons; most were unsuccessful, but Freeman did accept an offer to join organist Jimmy McGriff for a time. That partnership resulted in several albums, including Fly Dude from 1972, which features Freeman's guitar and compositions. Another collaboration from this period was with drummer Buddy Rich and tenorist Illinois Jacquet, a collaboration that also produced an album.

The 1970s also yielded Freeman's first album as leader, Birth Sign, and several other recordings—including Franticdiagnosis from 1972, New Improved Funk from 1973, and Man & Woman from 1974.

=== 1980–1999: Chicago and Rebellion ===
As the 1970s progressed, Freeman returned again to Chicago, which has remained the epicenter of his activities ever since.

Freeman resumed his work in local clubs, while at the same time, remained active in the recording studios. His appearance on Johnny Griffin's 1979 album Bush Dance is one of a number of highlights. Another is Freeman's 1995 album Rebellion, on which his brother Von holds down the piano chair.

=== 2000–2020: Live Engagements and multiple recordings ===
The 2000s were an active period for Freeman. He recorded multiple albums under his own name, including 90 Going on Amazing, a 2005 album produced and recorded by Sirus XM Jazz Director Mark Ruffin and released by Blujazz in August 2017. Freeman's other albums included collaborations with vocalist Kurt Elling, tenorist (and brother Von's son) Chico Freeman, and guitarist Mike Allemana. In George The Bomb from 2019, Freeman teamed with blues singer and harmonica player Billy Branch.

Freeman also remained an active performer—playing in New York City and Europe, but mostly, at home in Chicago. Freeman was a regular at the annual Chicago Jazz Festival, headlining with his brother Von, his nephew Chico (in 2015), Mike Allemana (in 2017), and Billy Branch (in 2019). Freeman also played engagements in jazz clubs and special events for the Jazz Institute of Chicago and the Association for the Advancement of Creative Musicians.

Freeman's calendar of engagements was scrapped in March 2020 when the Covid-19 pandemic forced the cancellation of public events and the closing of jazz clubs. Freeman kept himself busy at home for the next year practicing and composing new music.

=== 2021–2025: Everybody Say Yeah! and The Good Life ===
In April 2021, as Chicago clubs started reopening, Freeman returned to live performances with an engagement at The Green Mill Cocktail Lounge, just in time to celebrate his 94th Birthday on April 10. Freeman remained active throughout 2021, headlining the Englewood Jazz Festival on September 18, playing the Green Mill on October 1–2, and opening the Blues Festival at The University of Chicago's Logan Center on October 15.

Freeman returned to the Green Mill in Chicago on April 8 and 9, 2022 for his annual birthday weekend. In celebration of Freeman's 95th birthday on April 10, 2022, Southport Records released Everybody Say Yeah!, a new compilation of recordings that documents 26 years of Freeman's music from the Chicago label's catalog, unreleased tracks, and a new recording of "Perfume" with fellow guitarist Mike Allemana.

Freeman again entered the recording studio on May 7, 2022, leading a trio session with bassist Christian McBride and drummer Carl Allen. And on June 13, 2022, Freeman led another trio session, this time supported by organist Joey DeFrancesco and drummer Lewis Nash. These two recording sessions resulted in The Good Life, released by HighNote Records in June 2023.

Freeman also continued with his schedule of live performances during 2023. Highlights included his annual birthday residency at the Green Mill in April and an appearance with his nephew Chico at the Chicago Jazz Festival in August. Freeman's activities and 2023 record release were featured in articles in DownBeat and Guitar Player and on The Today Show on NBC.

Freeman turned 97 on April 10, 2024, and to celebrate this milestone, he led several shows at the Green Mill in Chicago on April 12 and 13. The Chicago Tribune, in its year-end survey of jazz performances in Chicago, heralded Freeman's Green Mill shows as among "the best of the best of the best" for 2024.

== Death ==
Freeman died on April 1, 2025, at the age of 97.

== Discography ==
=== As leader ===
- Introducing George Freeman Live with Charlie Earland Sitting In (Giant Step, 1971)
- Birth Sign (Delmark, 1972)
- Franticdiagnosis (Bam-Boo, 1972)
- New Improved Funk with Von Freeman (Groove Merchant, 1974)
- Man & Woman (Groove Merchant, 1974)
- Rebellion (Southport, 1995)
- George Burns! (Southport, 1999)
- At Long Last George (Savant, 2001) with Kurt Elling, René Marie, Von Freeman
- All in the Family with Chico Freeman (Southport, 2015)
- Live at the Green Mill with Mike Allemana (ears&eyes, 2017) also with Pete Benson, Bernard Purdie
- 90 Going on Amazing (Blujazz, 2017)
- George the Bomb! with Billy Branch (Southport, 2019)
- Everybody Say Yeah! (Southport, 2022)
- The Good Life (HighNote, 2023) with Joey DeFrancesco, Lewis Nash, Christian McBride, Carl Allen

=== As sideman ===
With Gene Ammons

- Hooray for John Coltrane, Gene Ammons (Session, 1970s)
- The Black Cat! (Prestige, 1971)
- You Talk That Talk! (Prestige, 1971)
- Swingin' the Jug (Roots, 1976)

With Richard "Groove" Holmes

- "Groove" (Pacific Jazz, 1961)
- Tell It Like It Tis (Pacific Jazz, 1966)
- Welcome Home (World Pacific, 1968)
- The Groover! (Prestige, 1968)

With Jimmy McGriff

- Fly Dude (Groove Merchant, 1972)
- Concert: Friday the 13th – Cook County Jail with Eli Lucky Thompson (Groove Merchant, 1973)
- Giants of the Organ Come Together with Richard "Groove" Holmes (Groove Merchant, 1973)
- 100% Pure Funk (LRC, 2001)

With others

- Mickey Fields, The Astonishing Mickey Fields (Edmar, 1960s)
- Wild Bill Davis, Dis Heah (This Here) (Everest, 1961)
- Charlie Parker, An Evening at Home with the Bird (Savoy, 1961)
- Les McCann, Oh Brother! (Fontana, 1964)
- Billy Mitchell, The Magic Touch of the Billy Mitchell Group (Calla, 1969)
- Shirley Scott, Mystical Lady (Cadet, 1971)
- Buddy Rich, The Last Blues Album Volume 1 (Groove Merchant, 1974)
- Johnny Griffin, Bush Dance (Galaxy, 1979)
- Charlie Parker, One Night in Chicago (Savoy, 1980)
- E. Parker McDougal, Blues Tour (Grits, 1981)
- Illinois Jacquet, Loot to Boot (LRC, 1991) − reissue of The Last Blues Album Volume 1
- Joe Morris, 1946–1949 (Classics, 2003)
- Red Holloway, Go Red Go! (Delmark, 2009)
