= London Concertante =

UK based musical group

- Orchestra
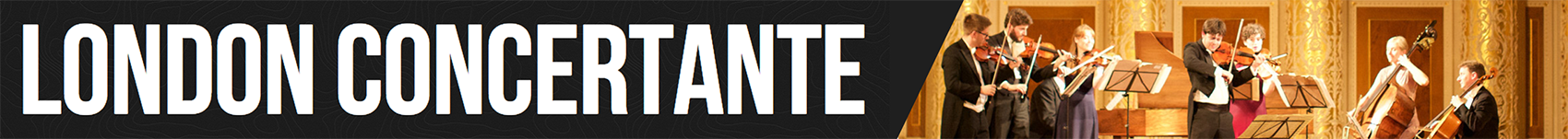
- Website: www.londonconcertante.com

London Concertante is a chamber ensemble, performing classical chamber music repertoire, along with gypsy and Latin American music such as the tango compositions of Piazzolla. The ensemble is led by artist director and cellist Chris Grist. They perform about a hundred concerts each year.

== History ==
Founded in 1991, the ensemble performed in the UK and made three tours to Spain in its first few years. In an expanded form, the ensemble performed as an opera orchestra, collaborating with Pegasus Opera, Palace Opera, Music Theatre Kernow and Holland Park Opera. The ensemble also began performing regularly at St. Martin-in-the-Fields, as well as also presenting concerts at the Southbank Centre, Southwark Cathedral, St. James' Piccadilly and Cadogan Hall. The ensemble has since toured to Finland, USA, Germany, Ireland, France, Spain, Holland and Italy.

The ensemble's first album, The Four Seasons, was released in 1995, on its own label. They have since recorded for Harmonia Mundi, Toccata Classics, Chandos and ARC Music.

== Recordings ==
- 2020 - Music from the Movies2020 - Romantic Viennese Waltzes
- 2009 - Piazzolla and Beyond
- 2007 - Allegro
- 2007 - Mendelssohn: Octet & String Symphony No. 10
- 2006 - Adagio
- 2006 - English Serenade
- 2003 - Brahms & Schoenberg: Sextets
- 2002 - Essential Mozart
- 2001 - Gypsy Tango Pasion
- 1997 - Bach Concertos
- 1995 - The Four Seasons

== Ensemble ==
- J.S.Bach - Brandenburg Concerto No.3
- Felix Mendelssohn - Octet for strings
- Astor Piazzolla - Oblivion
- Arnold Schoenberg - Verklärte Nacht
- Antonio Vivaldi - Four Seasons
