= Get Up & Get It! =

Studio album by Richard "Groove" Holmes
- Released: 1967
- Recorded: May 29, 1967
- Studio: Van Gelder Studio, Englewood Cliffs, New Jersey
- Genre: Jazz
- Length: 40:14
- Label: Prestige; PR 7514
- Producer: Don Schlitten

Richard "Groove" Holmes chronology
Super Soul (1967)	Get Up & Get It! (1967)	Soul Power! (1967)

Get Up & Get It! is an album by jazz organist Richard "Groove" Holmes which was recorded in 1967 and released on the Prestige label.

== Reception ==
Professional ratings
Review scores
Source	Rating
Allmusic	4/5 stars

Stewart Mason of Allmusic stated, "The organ trio format is so ensconced in the minds of soul-jazz fans that hearing this album, which puts Richard "Groove" Holmes' funky Hammond B3 in the context of a larger group, sounds odd and over-produced at first... but thankfully, Holmes' sidemen are up to the task at hand and steer clear of over-playing... The original "Groove's Blue Groove" is a particular highlight, but the entire album is worthy".

== Track listing ==
1. " Get Up and Get It" (Teddy Edwards) - 5:42
2. "Lee Ann" (Edwards) - 5:11
3. "Body and Soul" (Frank Eyton, Johnny Green, Edward Heyman, Robert Sour) - 9:23
4. "Broadway" (Billy Byrd, Teddy McRae, Henri Woode) - 5:26
5. "Groove's Blues Groove" (Richard "Groove" Holmes) - 8:04
6. "Pennies from Heaven" (Johnny Burke, Arthur Johnston) - 6:28

== Personnel ==
- Richard "Groove" Holmes - organ
- Teddy Edwards - tenor saxophone
- Pat Martino - guitar
- Paul Chambers - bass
- Billy Higgins - drums
