= That Healin' Feelin' (Richard "Groove" Holmes album) =

Studio album by Richard "Groove" Holmes
- Released: 1968
- Recorded: August 26, 1968
- Studio: Van Gelder Studio, Englewood Cliffs, New Jersey
- Genre: Jazz
- Length: 41:28
- Label: Prestige; PR 7601
- Producer: Cal Lampley

Richard "Groove" Holmes chronology
The Groover! (1968)	That Healin' Feelin' (1968)	Welcome Home (1969)

That Healin' Feelin' is an album by jazz organist Richard "Groove" Holmes which was recorded in 1968 and released on the Prestige label.

== Reception ==
Professional ratings
Review scores
Source	Rating
Allmusic	5/5 stars
New Record Mirror	4/5 stars
The Rolling Stone Jazz Record Guide	3/5 stars

Allmusic awarded the album 5 stars stating "Holmes is at the helm of a strong quartet on That Healin' Feelin', with especially notable contributions from Rusty Bryant (himself a soul-jazz artist of note) on sax and Billy Butler on guitar".

== Track listing ==
1. "That Healin' Feelin'" (Les McCann) - 8:43
2. "See See Rider" (Ma Rainey) - 6:20
3. "Irene Court" (Billy Butler) - 4:42
4. "Castle Rock" (Ervin Drake, Al Sears, Jimmy Shirl) - 5:20
5. "Laura" (Johnny Mercer, David Raksin) - 8:15
6. "On a Clear Day (You Can See Forever)" (Burton Lane, Alan Jay Lerner) - 8:08

== Personnel ==
- Richard "Groove" Holmes - organ
- Rusty Bryant - tenor saxophone, alto saxophone
- Billy Butler - guitar
- Herbie Lovelle - drums
