= Von Freeman =

American jazz saxophonist (1923–2012)

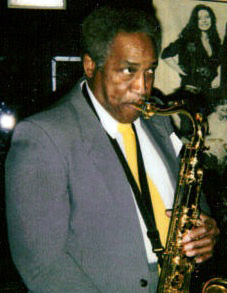
- Freeman in the 1990s

Background information
- Born: Earle Lavon Freeman; October 3, 1923; Chicago, Illinois, U.S.
- Died: August 11, 2012 (aged 88) Chicago, Illinois, U.S.
- Genres: Jazz; hard bop
- Occupation: Musician
- Instrument: Tenor saxophone
- Years active: 1932–2012
- Labels: India Navigation; SteepleChase; Atlantic; Nessa

Earle Lavon "Von" Freeman Sr. (October 3, 1923 – August 11, 2012) was an American hard bop jazz tenor saxophonist.

== Biography ==
Born in Chicago, Illinois, Freeman was exposed as a young child to jazz. His father, George, a city policeman, was a close friend of Louis Armstrong, with Armstrong living at the Freeman house when he first arrived in Chicago. Freeman's father taught him to play piano and bought him his first saxophone when he was seven. His musical education continued at DuSable High School, where his band director was Walter Dyett. Freeman began his professional career at the age of 16 in Horace Henderson's Orchestra.

Freeman enlisted into the Navy during World War II and was trained at Camp Robert Smalls in Chicago. "All the great musicians ended up at Great Lakes", he recalled. "It was an incubator for the best and the brightest lights in the jazz world at that time, and the musical jam sessions were simply phenomenal." After training, he was sent to Hawaii as part of the Hellcats stationed at Barbers Point Naval Air Station in a band that starred Harry "Pee Wee" Jackson, the trumpeter from Cleveland whose nickname was Gabriel. The Hellcats were frequent winners of the islands' competitive Battle of the Bands competitions and included musicians who had formerly played in bands fronted by Duke Ellington, Fletcher Henderson, Ella Fitzgerald, Lucky Millinder, Les Hite, Count Basie, Fats Waller, and Tiny Bradshaw. After his return to Chicago, where he remained for the duration of his career, Freeman played with his brothers George on guitar and Eldridge "Bruz" Freeman on drums at the Pershing Hotel Ballroom. Various leading jazzmen such as Charlie Parker, Roy Eldridge and Dizzy Gillespie played there with the Freemans as the backing band. In the early 1950s, Von played in Sun Ra's band.

Von Freeman's first venture into the recording studio took place in 1954, backing a vocal group called The Maples for Al Benson's Blue Lake label. He appeared on Andrew Hill's second single on the Ping label in 1956, followed by some recording for Vee-Jay with Jimmy Witherspoon and Albert B. Smith in the late 1950s, and a recorded appearance at a Charlie Parker tribute concert in 1970. In 1972, Freeman first recorded under his own name, the album Doin' It Right Now with the support of Roland Kirk. His next effort was a marathon session in 1975 released over two albums by Nessa. After that he lived, regularly performed, and recorded in Chicago. His recordings included three albums with his son, the tenorist Chico Freeman, and You Talkin' to Me with 22-year-old saxophonist Frank Catalano, following their successful appearance at the Chicago Jazz Festival in 1999. Four live albums for SteepleChase Records, Inside Chicago documented his partnership with trumpeter Brad Goode.

One of Freeman's contributions was his mentoring of countless younger musicians such as Steve Coleman, Corey Wilkes and Ben Paterson as well as his steadfast support of what he liked to call "hardcore jazz" (as he still did in a 2001 article in DownBeat.) Freeman's quartet played Monday nights throughout the 1970s and the mid-1980s at The Enterprise Lounge which closed when he toured Japan, and then Tuesdays at The New Apartment Lounge with his longtime trio of sidemen composed of drummer Michael Raynor, guitarist Mike Allemana and bassist Matt Ferguson. The quartet played a long set first, the vehicle that showcased Freeman's range from sensitively unwound ballads to intense improvisations that utilized his sometimes rough timbre and indefinite pitch to create a unique avant garde style of his own. His performances were also impressive verbal ones, as he served as an important figure that both helped African-American culture thrive on the South Side as well as invited the participation of European Americans and others into the warmth of the community he and the rest of the Enterprise and Apartment created. Freeman was considered a founder of the "Chicago School" of jazz tenorists along with Gene Ammons, Johnny Griffin and Clifford Jordan. His music has been described as "wonderfully swinging and dramatic" featuring a "large rich sound". "Vonski", as he was known by his jazz fans, was selected to receive the nation's highest jazz honor, the NEA Jazz Masters award. Freeman died of heart failure on August 11, 2012, in his home town, at the age of 88. Freeman was the father of jazz saxophonist Chico Freeman.

== Discography ==
=== As leader ===
- Doin' It Right Now (Atlantic, 1972)
- Have No Fear (Nessa, 1975)
- Serenade & Blues (Nessa, 1975)
- Young and Foolish (Daybreak, 1981)
- Lockin' Horns (Muse, 1981)
- Fathers and Sons (Columbia, 1982)
- Freeman & Freeman with Chico Freeman (India Navigation, 1989)
- Walkin' Tuff (Southport, 1989)
- Never Let Me Go (Steeplechase, 1992)
- Lester Leaps In (Steeplechase, 1993)
- Dedicated to You (Steeplechase, 1994)
- Fire (Southport, 1996)
- Von & Ed with Ed Petersen (Delmark, 1999)
- Live at the Blue Note (Half Note, 1999)
- You Talkin' to Me? with Frank Catalano (Delmark, 2000)
- Live at the Dakota (Premonition, 2001)
- The Improvisor (Premonition, 2002)
- The Great Divide (Premonition, 2004)
- Good Forever (Premonition, 2006)
- Vonski Speaks (Nessa, 2009)

=== As sideman ===
With Brad Goode

- 2001: Inside Chicago, Volume 1 with Von Freeman (SteepleChase)
- 2001: Inside Chicago, Volume 2 with Von Freeman (SteepleChase)
- 2002: Inside Chicago, Volume 3 with Von Freeman (SteepleChase)
- 2002: Inside Chicago, Volume 4 with Von Freeman (SteepleChase)

With April Aloisio

- 1994: Brazilian Heart
- 1996: Footprints
- 1998: Easy to Love

With Francesco Crosara

- 1999: Colors (Southport)
- 2003: Emotions (TCB)

With Kurt Elling

- 1995: Close Your Eyes
- 2000: Live in Chicago

With Chico Freeman

- 1988: You'll Know When You Get There
- 2010: Lord Riff and Me

With George Freeman

- 1969: Birth Sign (Delmark)
- 1973: New Improved Funk (Groove Merchant)
- 1977: All in the Game
- 1995: Rebellion
- 1999: George Burns
- 2001: At Long Last George

With Joanie Pallatto

- 1995: Passing Tones
- 2000: The King and I

With others

- 1978: Lockin' Horns, Willis Jackson
- 1981: Hyde Park After Dark, Clifford Jordan (Bee Hive)
- 1982: Fathers and Sons, Wynton Marsalis
- 1991: Rhythm in Mind, Steve Coleman (Novus)
- 1991: Transmigration, Strata Institute (Rebel-X/Columbia)
- 1992: No One Ever Tells You, Eden Atwood
- 1994: Silvering, Louis Smith
- 1999: Some Cats Know, Connie Evingson
- 2000: Come Walk with Me, Martha Lorin
- 2003: Emotions, Lilian Terry
- 2006: Solitaire Miles, Solitaire Miles
