= American Pie (Groove Holmes album) =

Studio album by Groove Holmes
- Released: 1972
- Recorded: 1972
- Studio: New York City
- Genre: Jazz
- Length: 36:59
- Label: Groove Merchant; GM 505
- Producer: Sonny Lester

Groove Holmes chronology
Comin' on Home (1971)	American Pie (1972)	Night Glider (1973)

American Pie is an album by American jazz organist Groove Holmes recorded in 1972 and released on the Groove Merchant label.

== Reception ==
Professional ratings
Review scores
Source	Rating
Allmusic	3.5/5 stars

Allmusic's Jason Ankeny said: "The soulful American Pie pairs Groove Holmes with electric pianist Larry Willis, suggesting a more nuanced and restrained interpretation of the organ/electric piano formula that energizes Holmes' Blue Note classic Comin' on Home ... Holmes and Willis weave a mellow, stoned-soul groove that twists and turns with lazy precision – although the material derives from sources spanning from Don McLean to Anthony Newley to Holmes himself ... the mood and tenor of the set never wavers, but the whole is far greater than the sum of its parts".

== Track listing ==
All compositions by Richard "Groove" Holmes except where noted

1. "American Pie" (Don McLean) – 2:56
2. "St. Thomas" (Sonny Rollins) – 4:35
3. "Catherine" – 6:02
4. "Fingers" – 5:35
5. "It's Impossible" (Armando Manzanero) – 4:54
6. "Here's That Rainy Day" (Jimmy Van Heusen, Johnny Burke) – 6:11
7. "Who Can I Turn To?" (Leslie Bricusse, Anthony Newley) – 6:48

== Personnel ==
- Groove Holmes – organ
- Larry Willis – electric piano
- Garald Hubbard – guitar
- Jerry Jemmott – bass
- Kwasi Jay Ourba – congas, bongos
