= Richard Holmes (organist) =

American jazz organist (1931–1991)

Richard "Groove" Holmes
- Born: Richard Arnold Holmes; May 2, 1931; Camden, New Jersey, U.S.
- Died: June 29, 1991 (aged 60) St. Louis, Missouri, U.S.
- Genres: Jazz; soul
- Occupations: Musician; composer; arranger
- Instrument: Organ
- Years active: 1961–1991
- Labels: Pacific Jazz; Prestige; World Pacific; Groove Merchant; Flying Dutchman; Muse

Richard Arnold "Groove" Holmes (May 2, 1931 – June 29, 1991) was an American jazz organist who performed in the hard bop and soul jazz genre. He is best known for his 1965 recording of "Misty".

== Career ==
Holmes's first album, on Pacific Jazz with guest Ben Webster, was recorded in March 1961. He recorded many albums for Pacific Jazz, Prestige, Groove Merchant, and Muse, many of them with Houston Person.

He died of a heart attack after battling prostate cancer, having performed his last concerts in a wheelchair. One of his last gigs was at the 1991 Chicago Blues Festival with his longtime friend, singer Jimmy Witherspoon.

== Discography ==
=== As leader ===
- "Groove" (Les McCann Presents the Dynamic Jazz Organ of Richard "Groove" Holmes) [also released as That Healin' Feelin' ] (Pacific Jazz, 1961) – with Ben Webster
- Groovin' with Jug (Pacific Jazz, 1961) – with Gene Ammons
- Somethin' Special (Pacific Jazz, 1962) – with Les McCann
- After Hours (Pacific Jazz, 1961–1962)
- Tell It Like It Tis (Pacific Jazz, 1961–1962 [rel. 1966])
- Book of the Blues Vol. 1 (Warner Bros., 1964) – with Onzy Matthews' orchestra [note: reissued on Groove Hut (#66707) in 2009]
- A Bowl of Soul (Loma/WB, 1966 [rel. 1967]) – with Onzy Matthews' orchestra [note: reissued on Groove Hut (#66707) in 2009]
- Blues For Spoon And Groove (Surrey, 1965) – with Jimmy Witherspoon [reissued as Groovin' and Spoonin' on Olympic/Everest in 1973]
- Soul Message (Prestige, 1965; CD reissue: OJC, 1988) [note: includes the original "full–length" version (6:00) of "Misty"]
- Living Soul (Recorded Live! at Count Basie's) (Prestige, 1966)
- On Basie's Bandstand [live] (Prestige, 1966 [rel. 2003])
- Soul Mist! (Prestige, 1966 [rel. 1970])
- Misty (Prestige, 1965–1966; CD reissue: OJC, 1992)
- Spicy! (Prestige, 1966)
- Super Soul (Prestige, 1967) – with Richard Evans
- Get Up & Get It! (Prestige, 1967)
- Soul Power! (Prestige, 1967)
- The Groover! (Prestige, 1968)
- That Healin' Feelin' (Prestige, 1968) – with Rusty Bryant
- Welcome Home (World Pacific, 1968)
- Workin' on a Groovy Thing (World Pacific, 1968)
- X–77: Richard "Groove" Holmes Recorded Live at the Lighthouse (World Pacific, 1969)
- Come Together (World Pacific, 1970) – with Ernie Watts
- Comin' on Home (Blue Note, 1971)
- American Pie (Groove Merchant, 1972)
- Night Glider (Groove Merchant, 1973)
- Giants of the Organ Come Together (Groove Merchant, 1973) – with Jimmy McGriff
- Giants of the Organ in Concert (Groove Merchant, 1973) – with Jimmy McGriff
- New Groove (Groove Merchant, 1974)
- Onsaya Joy [live] (Flying Dutchman, 1975)
- Six Million Dollar Man (Flying Dutchman, 1975)
- I'm in the Mood for Love (Flying Dutchman, 1976)
- Shippin' Out (Muse, 1977)
- Good Vibrations (Muse, 1977 [rel. 1980]) – with Houston Person, Bob DeVos, Idris Muhammad
- Dancing in the Sun (Versatile, 1978)
- Star Wars/Close Encounters (Versatile, 1978)
- Broadway (Muse, 1980; reissue: 32 Jazz, 1998) – with Houston Person
- Swedish Lullaby (Sison, 1984)
- Blues All Day Long (Muse, 1988; reissue: 32 Jazz, 1999) – with Cecil Bridgewater, Houston Person, Jimmy Ponder
- African Encounter (Muse, 1988)
- Hot Tat (Muse, 1989 [rel. 1991]) – with Cecil Bridgewater, Houston Person, Jimmy Ponder

=== LP/CD compilations ===
- Richard "Groove" Holmes: Jazz Milestone Series (Pacific Jazz, 1966) (compilation of Pacific Jazz material)
- The Best of Richard "Groove" Holmes (Prestige, 1969) (compilation of Prestige material)
- The Best of Richard "Groove" Holmes: For Beautiful People (Prestige, 1970) (another compilation of Prestige material)
- Hunk–a–Funk (Groove Merchant, 1975) (compilation of Night Glider + New Groove)
- Supa Cookin' (Groove Merchant, 1975) – with Jimmy McGriff (compilation of Giants of the Organ Come Together + Giants of the Organ in Concert)
- Groovin' With Groove (LRC [Lester Radio Corporation], 1994) (compilation of Groove Merchant albums: American Pie, Night Glider, New Groove)
- Blue Groove (Prestige, 1994) (compilation of Get Up & Get It! + Soul Mist!)
- After Hours (Pacific Jazz, 1996) (compilation of After Hours + Tell It Like It Is)
- Legends of Acid Jazz: Richard "Groove" Holmes (Prestige, 1997) (compilation of The Groover! + That Healin' Feelin')
- Groove's Groove (32 Jazz, 1998) (compilation of Muse albums: Shippin' Out, Good Vibrations, Broadway, Blues All Day Long)
- Legends of Acid Jazz: Richard "Groove" Holmes – Spicy (Prestige, 1999) (compilation of Living Soul + Spicy!)
- The Best of the Pacific Jazz Years (Pacific Jazz/EMI, 2001) (compilation of Pacific Jazz material)
- Timeless: Richard "Groove" Holmes (Savoy Jazz/Denon, 2003) (compilation of Muse material)
- Super Soul (Prestige, 2004) (compilation of Soul Power! + Super Soul)

=== As sideman ===
With Earl Bostic

- Jazz As I Feel It (King, 1963; reissued as Complete Quintet Recordings on Lone Hill Jazz in 2006) – with Joe Pass
- A New Sound (King, 1964; reissued as Complete Quintet Recordings on Lone Hill Jazz in 2006) – with Joe Pass

With Gerald Wilson

- You Better Believe It! (Pacific Jazz, 1961)
- Eternal Equinox (Pacific Jazz, 1969)

With others

- Bumble Bee Slim, Back in Town (Pacific Jazz, 1962)
- Willis Jackson, In Chateauneuf-du-Pape 1980 [also released as Ya Understand Me?] (Disques Black And Blue, 1980; Muse, 1984; reissued as Live On Stage (The Definitive Black & Blue Sessions) on Black & Blue in 2003 with 3 bonus tracks)
- Eric Kloss, Love and All That Jazz (Prestige, 1966)
- Les McCann, Les McCann Sings (Pacific Jazz, 1961)
- Lou Rawls, Black and Blue (Capitol, 1963)
- Dakota Staton, Madame Foo-Foo (Groove Merchant, 1972)
