= László Jávor =

Hungarian poet

László Jávor (Budapest, May 4, 1903 – Cannes, December 2, 1992) was a Hungarian poet and painter who wrote the poem that was the basis for the song "Gloomy Sunday", composed by Rezső Seress, later also notably recorded by Billie Holiday.

In 1935 Jávor wrote new lyrics for Gloomy Sunday, composed by Rezső Seress. Jávor's lyrics were formed as a narration to a dead lover. At the end of the song, the narrator decided to join their lover in death.
