= Salvador Camarata =

American composer and trumpeter (1913–2005)

- Also known as: "Tutti"; "Toots"
- Born: May 11, 1913; Glen Ridge, New Jersey, U.S.
- Died: April 13, 2005 (aged 91) Burbank, California, U.S.
- Genres: Classical; jazz
- Occupations: Musician; composer; arranger; record producer
- Instrument: Trumpet

Salvador "Tutti" Camarata (May 11, 1913 – April 13, 2005) was an American composer, arranger, trumpeter, and record producer. He was also known as "Toots" Camarata.

== Early life and career ==
Camarata was born in Glen Ridge, New Jersey, United States, and studied music at the Juilliard School in New York as a student of Bernard Wagenaar, Joseph Littau, Cesare Sodero, and Jan Meyerowitz. His early career was as a trumpeter for bands such as Jimmy and Tommy Dorsey, Benny Goodman, and others, eventually becoming the lead trumpet and arranger for Jimmy Dorsey (arranging such hits as "Tangerine", "Green Eyes", and "Yours"). He also arranged for Glen Gray and the Casa Loma Orchestra, Benny Goodman, Louis Armstrong, Bing Crosby, Nancy Sinatra, Billie Holiday, Ella Fitzgerald, Duke Ellington, and many others. He conducted and orchestrated a recording of Jascha Heifetz.

During World War II, he served as a flight instructor in the Army Air Forces.

== London Records ==
In 1944, J. Arthur Rank summoned Camarata to London, England, to write a musical score for the film London Town. He became good friends with Sir Edward Lewis, CEO of British Decca, and often visited Bridge House in Felsted (this was Sir Edward and Lady Lewis's summer home); the two founded London Records, with the aim of distributing classical music from the UK in the U.S. market. One of his assignments was to see that London Records maintained the best classical catalog in the industry. In addition to his "administrative" duties at London Records, he also served as a classical artist orchestrating and conducting a number of classical albums including the works of Puccini, Verdi, Bach, Bizet, Tchaikovsky, and Rachmaninoff.

He joined the American Society of Composers, Authors and Publishers (ASCAP) in 1948. His popular songs and instrumentals included "Mutiny in the Brass Section", "Story of the Stars", "Hollywood Pastime", "Dixieland Detour", "Moonlight Masquerade", "Louis", and "No More". He also composed the Verdiana Suite. Additional compositions include "Rumbalero", "Rhapsody for Saxophone", "Fingerbustin'", "Pizzicato Rhumba", "Tall Trees", "Evening Mist", and "Brasiliero".

Camarata also recorded other albums, including the popular Tutti's Trumpets (1957) and Tutti's Trombones, titles which featured his compositions and arrangements and are considered classics of the genre.

== Sunset Sound Recorders ==
In 1956, Walt Disney hired him to form Disneyland Records and to be music director and producer for the label. Camarata had suggested Disney build his own recording studio, but Disney declined and instead encouraged Camarata to build his own. In 1958, Camarata purchased the first building, an old auto repair shop on Sunset Boulevard in Hollywood, California, that would become the location of Sunset Sound Recorders. He produced over three hundred albums there during his 16-year association with Disney. He scored several albums at Disney to help children gain a knowledge of, and love for, Western classical music.

== Radio television and cinema work ==
During the 1940s, Camarata served as the musical arranger for the Jean Sablon Show on the CBS radio network, which included musical performances by the accordionist John Serry Sr. and an orchestra led by Paul Baron. Camarata was the musical conductor for several TV series, including Startime, The Vic Damone Show, and The Alcoa Hour. He was also the vocal supervisor for the 1963 movie Summer Magic, which included musical performances by Hayley Mills and Burl Ives. Many Disney movie sound tracks were also made at Sunset.

== Sound Factory ==
In November 1981, Camarata purchased the Sound Factory, previously owned by David Hassinger. Like the Sunset Sound studios, the Sound Factory is one of the top recording studios in Hollywood, and has been used by many top artists, including Jackson Browne, the Flying Burrito Brothers, Linda Ronstadt, Ringo Starr, T Bone Burnett, Belle and Sebastian, Bette Midler, Richie Furay, Warren Zevon, Dolly Parton, Elvis Costello, Sam Phillips, Tonio K., Neil Diamond, Cher, Los Lobos, the Wallflowers, Kiss, Van Halen, Kenny Rogers, Beck, Brian Wilson, Victoria Williams, Ben Folds Five, Red Hot Chili Peppers, and Danny Elfman, among others.

== Final work ==
Camarata's last album was The Power and the Glory, on which he worked for four years. Once completing the arrangements, Camarata returned to England (St. John's, Smith Square) to conduct a large orchestra and choir for the recording of the album, which he had noted in one of his last interviews to be one of his most important works. It was released in 1996.

In April 2005, he died in Burbank, California, aged 91.
