= Lorez Alexandria =

American jazz singer (1929–2001)

Background information
- Born: Dolorez Alexandria Turner; August 14, 1929; Chicago, Illinois, U.S.
- Died: May 22, 2001 (aged 71) Gardena, California
- Genres: Vocal jazz
- Occupation: Singer
- Years active: 1950s–1990s
- Labels: King; Argo; Impulse!; Pzazz; Discovery; Trend; Muse

Lorez Alexandria (born Dolorez Alexandria Turner; August 14, 1929 – May 22, 2001) was an American jazz singer, described as "one of the most gifted and underrated jazz singers of the twentieth century". She became established in the Midwest before moving to Los Angeles in the mid-1960s. Jazz critics have compared her to Dinah Washington, Sarah Vaughan, Carmen McRae, and Ella Fitzgerald.

== Early life ==
Dolorez Alexandria Turner was born on August 14, 1929, in Chicago, Illinois. Growing up she began singing gospel music in church choirs and traveled throughout the Midwest with a traveling Baptist a cappella group. Later, when she entered the Chicago club circuit, she became a regular performer at venues like the Brass Rail and the Cloister Inn.

In Chicago, Alexandria became a local favorite and recorded for the first time for several independent local labels such as King Records, and later Argo Records. During this early part of her career, she was closely connected with the Chicago pianist, composer, and bandleader Walter "King" Fleming who provided the accompaniment on her debut album This is Lorez.

== Career ==
=== King Records ===
In 1957, Alexandria was signed to King Records. That year saw the release of her first album This is Lorez with the King Fleming Quartet, followed by Lorez Sings Pres: A Tribute to Lester Young, which was an homage to the tenor saxophonist. Featured on the LP were trumpet players Paul Serrano and Cy Touff, with King Fleming providing the accompaniment. The album featured tunes from the songbook of Billie Holiday, a close friend of Lester Young. On the track "No Eyes Blues" Alexandria effortlessly scats with the ease of Ella Fitzgerald, as Serrano and Toff jump into accent her rich melodic line.

She recorded two more albums for King Records in 1959, releasing the LPs The Band Swings – Lorez Sings and Singing Songs That Everyone Knows back to back. On The Band Swings, Alexandria played with a full orchestra for the first time, and vocally engages the listener by swinging, scatting, and paraphrasing, reminiscent to some of the timbre achieved by Sarah Vaughan and Carmen McRae.

=== Argo Records ===
Alexandria collaborated with pianist Ramsey Lewis, with whom she had performed in 1958, and some of Count Basie's sidemen; the LP Early in the Morning was released on Argo in 1960. On the title track, she proves her comfort with the blues, backed up by a rhythm section that creates just enough space for her to fill alongside explosions of blue notes by Lewis on the piano.

She recorded three more LPs for the label – including Sing No Sad Songs for Me in 1961 which featured a full-string section, and Deep Roots in 1962, which featured trumpeter Howard McGhee. Her last album for Argo, and the last album that she made in Chicago, For Swingers Only, came out in 1963 before she left the midwest for California.

=== Impulse! Records ===
In 1964 Alexandria moved to Los Angeles in pursuit of further opportunities to perform in clubs and record, quickly becoming a featured vocalist at venues including the Parisian Room and Marla's Memory Lane. She signed to Impulse!, a jazz label, was anticipated to be her jump onto the national stage after seven years of working with independent labels at King and Argo.

Alexandria's 1964 album Alexandria the Great, her first on Impulse!, was produced by Bob Thiele. Pianist Wynton Kelly accompanied her, with Paul Horn and Bud Shank alternating on flute, Victor Feldman on vibraphone, Ray Crawford on guitar, Paul Chambers on bass and Jimmy Cobb on drums. Her rhythmic and melodic interpretation of the lyric on "Over the Rainbow" redefined the texture of the composition and reflected her ability to make well-known songs her own.

Her second album on Impulse!, More of the Great Lorez Alexandria, was released later in 1964 and produced by Tutti Camarata. Shortly thereafter, though, her relationship with the label ended in the midst of a decision by the headquarters of ABC Records that vocal music should be housed on the pop side of the company.

== Musical style ==
In the liner notes of Alexandria the Great she wrote: "My grandmother on my mother's side was a minister, my grandmother on my father's side was a minister, and my mother's sister is married to a Methodist minister so this influence is very strong. Everyone in my family sings." In the mid-1960s while being interviewed for a piece in the jazz magazine DownBeat, she said that:

"I tried actually to divorce myself from singing with religious overtones or aspects...Maybe it's because I had this kind of background. The Gospelizing or use of so-called "soul" singing – that sort of thing – has become very large in the business. [But] I'm not a shouter and I'm not a Gospel singer. I wasn't a Gospel singer when I was singing in the church. I can't yell; I can't do this other thing. But I was effective... Anybody can sing spiritually without being labeled a Gospel singer."

When asked what made her singing style unique, she once said "my feeling for a lyric, I'm a storyteller and I try to have excellent diction so you don't have to guess what I'm saying. Some people listen to a song for years and don't know what the lyric is." In 1965 while listening to "Violets For Your Furs" by Billie Holiday, Alexandria said:

"There's not too much left to say about Billie Holiday, how is it possible for a woman to be this great? This comes from a period when she wasn't supposed to be singing too well, yet I've never heard anything from her that I didn't realize what she was feeling which is very important regardless of the shape of the pipes or what may be happening. She always got the message across. She never failed."

== Later recordings ==
Beginning in 1978 and continuing until 1993, Alexandria resumed recording, releasing several albums with a number of record labels, including Discovery, Trend, and Muse. Between 1980 and 1984, she released a three-volume tribute to the composer Johnny Mercer, Sings the Songs of Johnny Mercer, Vol. 1, Sings the Songs of Johnny Mercer, Vol. II: Harlem Butterfly, and Sings the Songs of Johnny Mercer, Vol. III: Tangerine. On Harlem Butterfly and Tangerine, which later received a Grammy nomination in 1984, Alexandria was supported by Los Angeles pianist Gildo Mahones and his quartet featuring Herman Riley on saxophone, Andy Simpkins on bass, and Carl Burnett on drums. On Vol. 1 she was supported by the Mike Wofford Quartet.

Gordon Brisker, the tenor saxophonist, contributed many of the arrangements for Alexandria's 1987 album Dear to My Heart, released by Trend Records. On this record, Alexandria displayed that she still had the ability to re-imagine well-known standards. I'll Never Stop Loving You, her second album released on Muse Records in spring 1992 featured Herman Riley on tenor saxophone and flute and pianist Gildo Mahones, with whom she had collaborated in 1984. On her last album, Star Eyes, released in June 1993, Alexandria was joined by tenor saxophonist Houston Person, guitarist Bruce Forman, pianist Stan Hope, bassist Peter Weiss and drummer Michael Carvin.

Shortly after Star Eyes was released, she suffered a stroke and never fully recovered. After retiring in Gardena, California, she told a friend: "I'm tired – I've had my day." In 1989, Impulse! reissued Alexandria the Great and More of the Great Lorez Alexandria on a single CD. Between 2004 and 2005, Verve Records also re-released both records separately.

In 2001, at the age of 71, Alexandria died, remembered by some as one of the most under-appreciated jazz vocalists of the 20th century.

== Discography ==
- This Is Lorez! (King, 1957)
- Lorez Sings Pres (Federal, 1958)
- The Band Swings - Lorez Sings (King, 1959)
- Standards with a Slight Touch of Jazz [AKA Singing Songs Everybody Knows] (King, 1960)
- Early in the Morning (Argo, 1960) – with Ramsey Lewis Trio
- Sing No Sad Songs for Me (Argo, 1961)
- Deep Roots (Argo, 1962)
- For Swingers Only (Argo, 1963)
- Alexandria the Great (Impulse!, 1964)
- More of the Great Lorez Alexandria (Impulse!, 1964)
- Didn't We (Pzazz, 1968)
- In a Different Bag (Pzazz, 1969)
- From Broadway to Hollywood (Trio [Japan], 1977)
- How Will I Remember You? (Discovery, 1978)
- A Woman Knows (Trend, 1979)
- Sings the Songs of Johnny Mercer, Vol. 1 (Discovery, 1981) – with Mike Wofford Quartet
- Sings the Songs of Johnny Mercer, Vol. II: Harlem Butterfly (Discovery, 1984) – with Gildo Mahones Quartet
- Sings the Songs of Johnny Mercer, Vol. III: Tangerine (Trend, 1985) – with Gildo Mahones Quartet
- Dear to My Heart (Trend, 1987)
- My One and Only Love (CBS/Sony [Japan], 1987)
- May I Come in (Muse, 1991)
- I'll Never Stop Loving You (Muse, 1993)
- Talk About Cozy (Hindsight, 1995)
- Star Eyes (Muse, 1996)
