= Rezső Seress =

Hungarian pianist and composer (1899–1968)

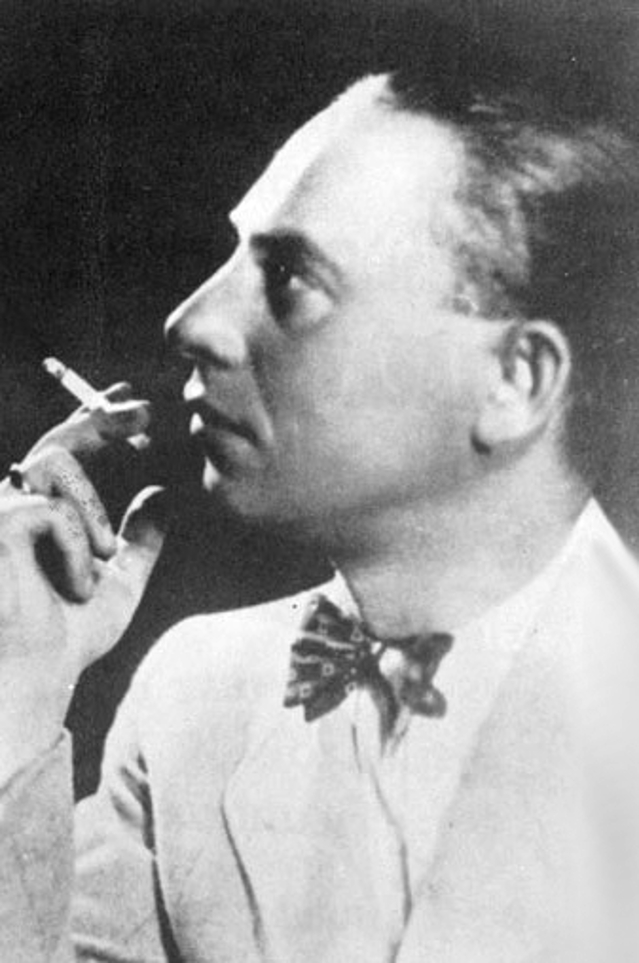
- Born: 3 November 1899; Budapest, Kingdom of Hungary, Austria-Hungary
- Died: 12 January 1968 (aged 68); Budapest, Hungarian People's Republic
- Cause of death: Suicide by choking
- Resting place: Kozma Street Cemetery
- Occupations: Pianist; composer
- Years active: 1925–1968
- Notable work: "Gloomy Sunday"

Rezső Seress (Hungarian: Seress Rezső, [ˈʃɛrɛʃː ˈrɛʒøː]; 3 November 1899 – 12 January 1968) was a Hungarian pianist and composer. Some sources give his birth name as Rudolf ("Rudi") Spitzer.

== Early life ==
Rezső Seress lived most of his life in poverty in Budapest, from where, being Jewish, he was taken to a labor camp by the Nazis during the Second World War. He survived the camp and after employment in the theatre and the circus, where he was a trapeze artist, he concentrated on songwriting and singing after an injury. Seress taught himself to play the piano with only one hand. He composed many songs, including Fizetek főúr (Waiter, bring me the bill), Én úgy szeretek részeg lenni (I love being drunk), and a song for the Hungarian Communist Party to commemorate the chain bridge crossing the river in Budapest, Újra a Lánchídon (Again on the chain bridge).

His most famous composition is Szomorú Vasárnap ("Gloomy Sunday"), written in 1933, which gained infamy as it became associated with a spate of suicides.

Seress felt a strong loyalty to Hungary, and one reason for his poverty while having a world-famous song was that he never wished to go to the USA to collect his royalties, instead staying as pianist at the Kispipa restaurant in his hometown. This restaurant had a pipe stove at the centre of its dining room and was remarkably cold for a restaurant. The place was a favourite of prostitutes, musicians, bohemian spirits and the Jewish working class.

As his fame began to wane, along with his loyalty to the communist party, Seress plunged into depression. Though he himself survived the Nazi forced labour in the Ukraine, his mother didn't, which intensified his gloom.

== Death ==
Seress committed suicide in Budapest in January 1968; he survived jumping out of a window, but later in the hospital, he choked himself to death with a wire.

== Legacy ==
His obituary in The New York Times mentions the notorious reputation of "Gloomy Sunday":

Budapest, January 13.

Rezsoe [sic] Seress, whose dirge-like song hit, "Gloomy Sunday" was blamed for touching off a wave of suicides during the nineteen-thirties, has ended his own life as a suicide it was learned today. Authorities disclosed today that Mr. Seress jumped from a window of his small apartment here last Sunday, shortly after his 69th [sic] birthday.
The decade of the nineteen-thirties was marked by severe economic depression and the political upheaval that was to lead to World War II. The melancholy song written by Mr. Seress, with words by his friend, Ladislas Javor, a poet, declares at its climax, "My heart and I have decided to end it all." It was blamed for a sharp increase in suicides, and Hungarian officials finally prohibited it.
In America, where Paul Robeson introduced an English version, some radio stations and nightclubs forbade its performance.

Mr. Seress complained that the success of "Gloomy Sunday" actually increased his unhappiness, because he knew he would never be able to write a second hit.

— The New York Times, January 13, 1968,
