= Masque of the Red Death (album) =

Compilation album by Diamanda Galás
- Released: 1 December 1988
- Recorded: 1986–1987
- Genre: Avant-garde
- Length: 96:40
- Label: Mute

Diamanda Galás chronology
You Must Be Certain of the Devil (1988)	Masque of the Red Death (1988)	Plague Mass (1991)

Professional ratings
Review scores
Source	Rating
AllMusic	3/5 stars

Masque of the Red Death is an anthology album by avant-garde musician Diamanda Galás, released on 1 December 1988 by Mute Records. It comprises three studio albums previously issued only on LP: The Divine Punishment, Saint of the Pit and You Must Be Certain of the Devil.

== Track listing ==
All music is composed by Diamanda Galás, except where noted.

Disc one The Divine Punishment
No.	Title	Length
1.	"Deliver Me From Mine Enemies" (I. This Is the Law of the Plague/II. Deliver Me From Mine Enemies/ III. We Shall not Accept Your Quarantine/IV. Εξελόυμε/V. Γιατί, Ό Θεός?/VI. Psalm 22)	19:15
2.	"Free Among the Dead" (I. Psalm 88/II. Lamentations/III. Sono L'Antichristo)	13:32

Saint of the Pit
No.	Title	Lyrics	Length
3.	"La Treizième revient" (The Thirteenth Returns)		5:03
4.	"Εξελόυμε" (Deliver Me)	Galás	7:18
5.	"L'Héautontimorouménos" (The Self-Tormentor)	Baudelaire	6:48
6.	"Artémis"	de Nerval	5:01
7.	"Cris d'aveugle" (Blind Man's Cry)	Corbière	12:15

Disc two You Must Be Certain of the Devil
No.	Title	Writer(s)	Length
1.	"Swing Low, Sweet Chariot"	Willis	2:44
2.	"Double-Barrel Prayer"		5:01
3.	"Let's Not Chat About Despair"		5:00
4.	"Birds of Death"		5:15
5.	"You Must Be Certain of the Devil"		4:55
6.	"Let My People Go"	Traditional	3:22
7.	"Malediction"		4:17
8.	"The Lord Is My Shepherd"		1:13

== Release history ==
Region	Date	Label	Format	Catalog
United Kingdom	1988	Mute	CD	STUMM 46
United States	1993	Mute Ltd.	CD	61588
