= The Singer (Diamanda Galás album) =

Studio album by Diamanda Galás
- Released: 27 April 1992
- Recorded: 1 November 1991
- Studio: Sorcerer Sound, New York City
- Genre: Blues
- Length: 45:48
- Label: Mute
- Producer: Diamanda Galás, Eric Liljestrand

Diamanda Galás chronology
| Plague Mass (1991) | The Singer (1992) | Vena Cava (1993) |

Professional ratings
Review scores
| Source | Rating |
|---|---|
| AllMusic | 3/5 stars |
| Q | 3/5 stars |
| Rolling Stone | 3/5 stars |

The Singer is an album by Diamanda Galás released in 1992, largely featuring her versions of classic blues and gospel songs. The cover art is notable for a glamor shot of the artist, which on closer inspection reveals the words "We are all HIV+" tattooed on her knuckles. The album is dedicated to people with AIDS, as is much of her work.

== Track listing ==
1. "My Love Will Never Die" (Willie Dixon)
2. "Reap What You Sow" (Mike Bloomfield, Nick Gravenites)
3. "Were You There When They Crucified My Lord?" (Roy Acuff)
4. "Gloomy Sunday" (László Jávor, Desmond Carter, Rezső Seress) (made famous by Billie Holiday)
5. "Balm In Gilead/Swing Low, Sweet Chariot" (Traditional, Wallace Willis; arranged by Galás)
6. "Insane Asylum" (Willie Dixon)
7. "I Put a Spell on You" (Screamin' Jay Hawkins)
8. "Let My People Go" (Traditional; words and arrangement by Galás)
9. "See That My Grave Is Kept Clean" (Blind Lemon Jefferson)
10. "Judgement Day"

== Personnel ==
- Diamanda Galás - piano, organ, vocals

== Release history ==
| Region | Date | Label | Format | Catalog |
|---|---|---|---|---|
| United Kingdom | 1992 | Mute | CD, LP | STUMM 103 |
| United States | 1992 | Mute Ltd. | CD, CS | 9-61278 |
