= Let My People Go =

"Let My People Go" is a phrase that originates in the Book of Exodus 5:1:

And afterward Moses and Aaron went in, and told Pharaoh, Thus saith the Lord God of Israel, Let my people go, that they may hold a feast unto me in the wilderness.

Let My People Go may also refer to:

== Film ==
- Let My People Go: The Story of Israel, a 1965 film
- Let My People Go! (2011 film)

== Music ==
- "Go Down Moses", traditional song known for the line
- "Let My People Go!", a line from the song "All You Zombies" by The Hooters
- "Let My People Go", a line from the song "Creeping Death" by Metallica
- "Let My People Go", a line from the song "Pharaoh" by Brandon Lake
- "Let My People Go", a song by Donny Osmond from the album Portrait of Donny
- "Let My People Go", a song by The Pursuit of Happiness from the album Love Junk
- "Let My People Go", a 1968 song by Brother Jack McDuff from the album The Natural Thing
- "Let My People Go", a song by The Winans
- "Let My People Go", a cover of "Go Down Moses" by Diamanda Galás from the album You Must Be Certain of the Devil
- Let My People Go, an album by Darondo
- Let My People Go-Go, a song by The Rainmakers

== Other ==
- "Let My People Go", a 1943 pamphlet by Victor Gollancz

== See also ==
- "Let My People Be", a song by the Tom Robinson Band on the 1979 album TRB Two
- Let My People Come, an explicit musical about sex which premiered in 1974
- "Let My People Live!", a series of events instituted in 2005 by the World Holocaust Foundation to preserve memories of the Holocaust
