= 25 Minutes to Go =

Song by Shel Silverstein

Song by Shel Silverstein

from the album Inside Folk Songs
- Released: 1962
- Genre: Country
- Label: Atlantic
- Songwriter: Shel Silverstein

"25 Minutes to Go" is a song by Shel Silverstein, from his 1962 album Inside Folk Songs.

== Lyrics ==
The song is literally "gallows humor", as it is sung by a man awaiting his own execution by hanging. Each verse consists of two lines, of which the first line is anything from humorous to poignant, and the second line is a minute-by-minute countdown.

Well they're buildin' the gallows outside my cell.
I got 25 minutes to go.

And the whole town's waitin' just to hear me yell.
I got 24 minutes to go.

And so on. The song is similar in concept to Silverstein's children's song "Boa Constrictor": It presents the point of view of someone who is experiencing a calamity in real time, composing and singing as the events unfold, with a fatal conclusion. "Boa Constrictor", like "25 Minutes to Go", appeared on Silverstein's 1962 album Inside Folk Songs. Johnny Cash was the second artist to do a cover of the song where it differs most notably by having omitted lines.

== Later versions ==
- Brothers Four, on their 1963 album Cross Country Concert.
- Johnny Cash on his 1965 album Sings the Ballads of the True West and on his 1968 live album, At Folsom Prison. In the Folsom version, he mistakenly says seven minutes instead of four minutes.
- Danish singer Povl Dissing with the band The Beefeaters as "25 Minutter endnu" (1967 single).
- Flemish singer Will Tura from Belgium as "20 minuten geduld" in 1968.
- Swedish folk singer sv:Ewert Ljusberg on Goknul (1972).
- American avant-garde singer Diamanda Galás on Malediction & Prayer (1998, Asphodel Records).
- Finnish duo Eero and Jussi Raittinen perform the sing in the movie Topralli (1966)
- British cult band Tiger Lillies on 2 Penny Opera (2001).
- American country/rock band Pine Valley Cosmonauts on The Executioner's Last Songs (2002).
- German metal band Dezperadoz on their third album An Eye for an Eye.
- German singer Gunter Gabriel on his album The Tennessee-Recordings (2003).
- American rock band Pearl Jam on their 2004 album Live at Benaroya Hall.
- Canadian band Head of the Herd on their first album On the House
- Berlin-based band Dangerpony (Laura Bruce, Laurent Lavolé and others)
- Lou Reed and Emily Haines performed a version in 2011 at Shelebration! A tribute to the works of Shel Silverstein

== See also ==
- Execution ballad
