= Head of the Herd =

Canadian rock band

- Also known as: @hothband
- Origin: Vancouver, British Columbia, Canada
- Genres: Alternative rock, blues rock, rock and roll
- Years active: 2010–present
- Label: Head of the Herd Music Inc.
- Members: Neu Mannas; Clay Frank; Matty Carolei; Brittany Willacy; Cory Curtis
- Past members: Kevin Webster; Wes Mack; Lydia Hol; Dave Gens
- Website: www.headoftheherdmusic.com

Head of the Herd is a band from Vancouver, British Columbia, Canada. The band plays a combination of blues influenced alternative rock.

As of June 2015, Head of the Herd was in studio recording their album Birds On The Roof, to be released September 25, 2015. They are working in the south of Georgia, US, with producer Mark Neill, notable for his work with The Black Keys & J Roddy Walston and the Business; in the UK at Rockfield Studios with producer Ian Davenport, notable for his work with Band Of Skulls, Radiohead's Phillip Selway & Other Lives; and in Vancouver with producer Garth Richardson, notable for his work with Rage Against the Machine, Red Hot Chili Peppers, and Biffy Clyro. The album will also have songs produced by the band's singer Neu Mannas.

The band have toured with Guns N' Roses, Alice In Chains, Theory of a Deadman, played major festivals (Squamish Valley Music Festival, Shorefest, Kitchener Blues Fest, Boonstock) and done headlining tours since the release of their sophomore album, By This Time Tomorrow. Prior to this album's release, the band toured in support of their debut album On the House, playing throughout the West, including at TelusFest, the Grey Cup Festival, and opening for The Sheepdogs and The Trews. All this shortly after their formation in June 2010.

In 2014, Head of the Herd won an award for Best New Rock Group at the 2014 Canadian Radio Music Awards in Toronto. That year they toured the festival circuit including performing at the Squamish Valley Music Festival, headlined tours, and supported others.

The band was created over a trip to Boise, Idaho, to watch a college football game. "Hours spent showing each other demos on the drive and cowboy boots full of whiskey flasks at the game, led to a fuzzy yet memorable weekend that marked the genesis of the band."

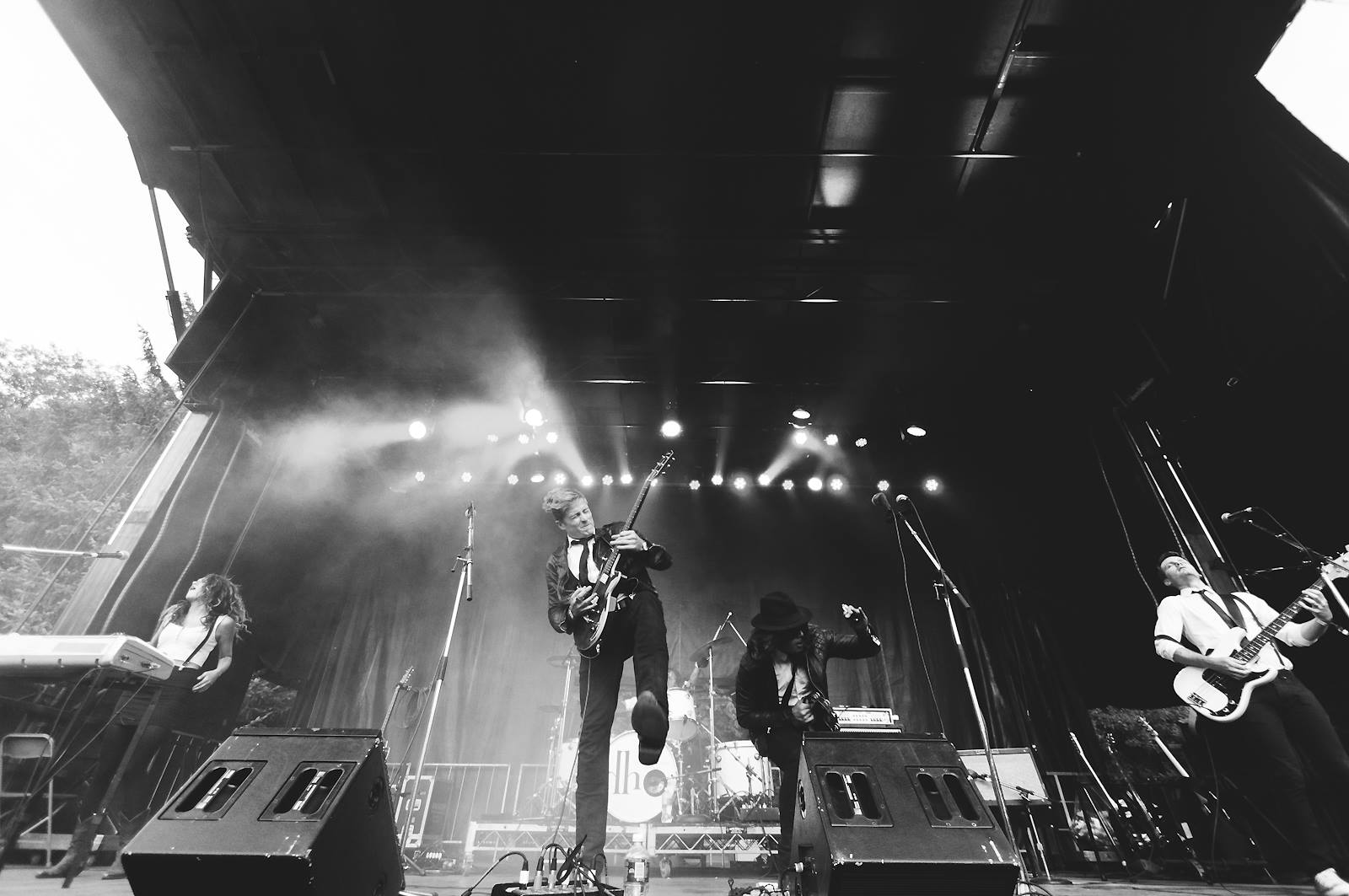
Head of the herd squamish by derek robitaille

== Band members ==
- Neu Mannas - lead vocals & guitar (Live). + bass, piano, organ & percussion (in studio) (2010–present)
- Clay Frank - Guitar, Harmonica & Percussion (Live & In Studio) (2010–present)
- Matty Carolei - Drums (Live & In Studio) (2013–present)
- Brittany Willacy - Piano, organ, and background vocals (Live) (2013–present)
- Cory Curtis - Bass and background vocals (Live) (2014–present)

== Albums ==
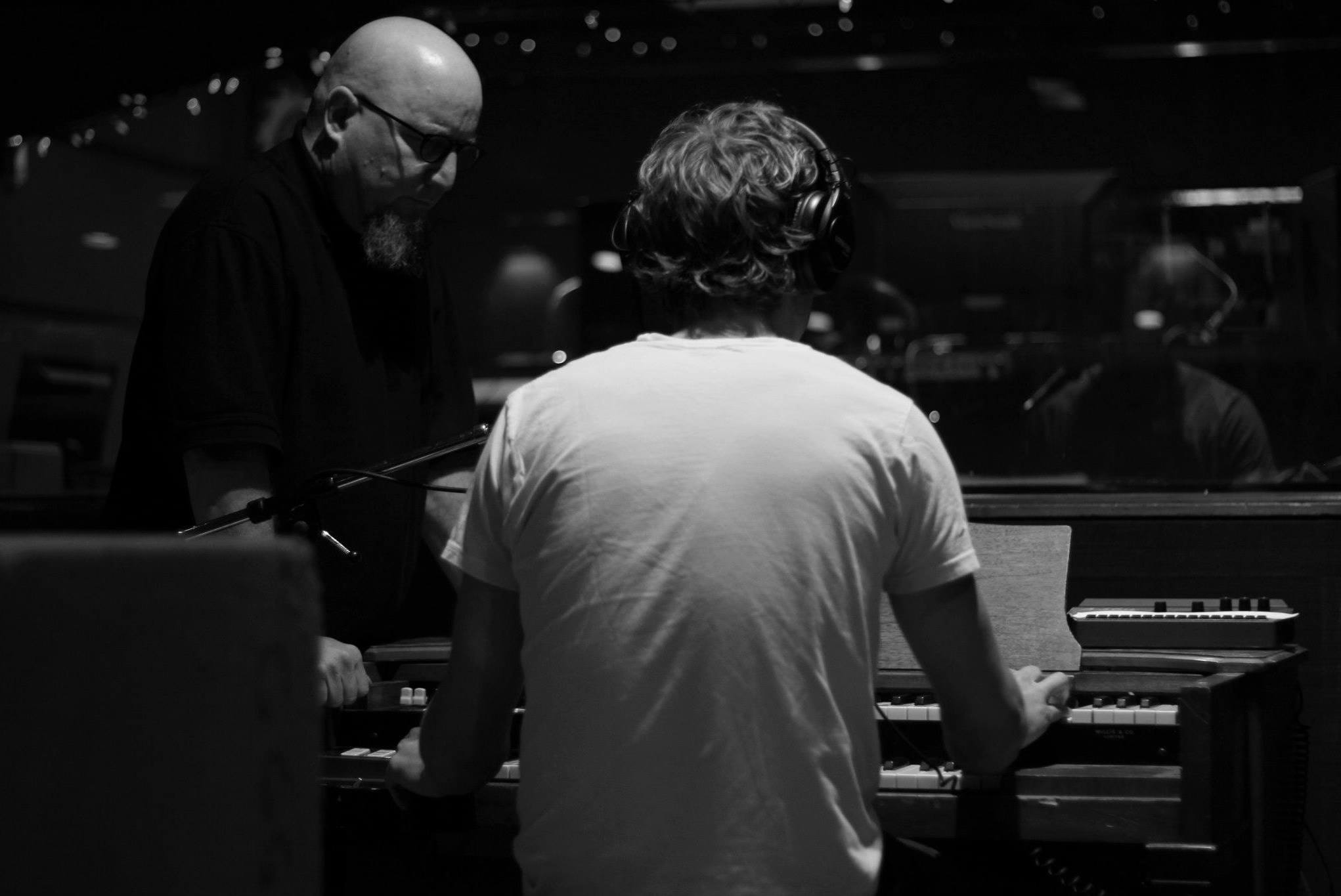
Neu and Garth. The Farm Studios - 2012

For Head of the Herd's debut album, On the House, all instruments were played by Neu and Clay, produced in Vancouver by Neu Mannas, and released February 1, 2011. All songs were written by Neu Mannas & Clay Frank, excluding the cover of "25 Minutes to Go", a song written by Shel Silverstein and made famous by Johnny Cash on his live album At Folsom Prison.

The band's second album, By This Time Tomorrow. developed in conjunction with music producer Garth Richardson, and Rick Jackett and James Black of Finger Eleven, missed its June 4, 2013, release date, but was later successfully launched on October 22, 2013, distributed through Universal Music Group. The album's first single, "By This Time Tomorrow" featuring Jasmin Parkin of Mother Mother, was used by CBC's Hockey Night in Canada for the intro to the Chicago Blackhawks and Detroit Red Wings playoff game on May 27, 2013. It also reached #1 for rock songs played on Canadian radio, according to Nielsen Broadcast Data Systems The following singles "Ain't My Day" and "We Could Get Together" peaked at #15 & #11 respectively on the Canadian Active Rock Chart. The session with Rick and James was recorded at Coalition Studios in Toronto, Ontario, while the session with Garth Richardson was recorded at The Farm Studios in Vancouver, British Columbia.

All songs on By This Time Tomorrow were written by Neu Mannas and Clay Frank. Most of which were written at Freedom Lane Studios in Coeur D'Alene, Idaho. The album was mixed by Ben Kaplan and mastered by Brock McFarlane (CPS Mastering), both in Vancouver.

== Discography ==
=== On the House ===
On the House is the first album released by Head of the Herd. It was released on February 1, 2011, independently. All songs written by Neu Mannas and Clay Frank (excluding "25 Minutes to Go").

Track listing

No.	Title	Length
1.	"Knock Me Down"	3:19
2.	"You Got Me Now"	3:33
3.	"Stopping a Heart"	2:58
4.	"Little Lamb"	2:52
5.	"Erinyes"	3:12
6.	"When I Met the Devil"	4:16
7.	"She Wants It All"	2:40
8.	"I Need You"	2:56
9.	"Devil Woman"	3:36
10.	"Lock the Door"	3:32
11.	"You Tied Your Hands Yourself"	3:47
12.	"25 Minutes to Go (Shel Silverstein/Johnny Cash) Cover"	3:50
13.	"Name, Number & Home"	4:44

=== By This Time Tomorrow ===
By This Time Tomorrow is the second album released by Head of the Herd. It was released on October 22, 2013, distributed in Canada through Universal Music Group. All songs written by Neu Mannas and Clay Frank.

Track listing

No.	Title	Length
1.	"You Come, You Go"	3:56
2.	"By This Time Tomorrow (Feat. Jasmin Parkin)"	4:20
3.	"Take Ten Steps"	3:52
4.	"Ain't My Day"	3:26
5.	"We Could Get Together"	3:25
6.	"Breathe Me Baby"	3:33
7.	"Don't Think You Will (Feat. Jasmin Parkin)"	3:03
8.	"Elizabeth"	3:58
9.	"The Great Flood"	3:09

Deluxe edition (2014)

No.	Title	Length
10.	"By This Time Tomorrow (Demo)"	3:35
11.	"When I Met the Devil (Live)"	4:50
12.	"Ain't My Day (Live)"	3:45
13.	"We Could Get Together (Neu Remix)"	3:25
14.	"Ain't My Day (Neu Remix)"	2:28

=== Birds on the Roof ===
Birds on the Roof is the third studio album by Head of the Herd, released on September 25, 2015, via Head of the Herd Music Inc. and distributed in Canada through Universal Music Group. All songs are written by Neu Mannas and Clay Frank.

Track listing

No.	Title	Length
1.	"I'm a Mother"	3:35
2.	"Live for Love"	3:30
3.	"Every Single Day"	3:32
4.	"How Was I Supposed to Know"	3:46
5.	"Gone Too Far"	3:05
6.	"Lightning's Out the Way"	2:39
7.	"Giving Tree"	2:54
8.	"All the Way"	3:22
9.	"Take Your Time, I'm Going Away"	3:46
10.	"The World Is at a Loss Without You"	4:32
11.	"Spend My Life on You"	4:08
12.	"This Could Be a Trap"	3:49
13.	"When the Plane Dives"	7:05

Deluxe edition

No.	Title	Length
14.	"Fall in Love Again"	3:30
15.	"Nothing at Once"	3:39
