= Francis Throckmorton =

English Catholic conspirator (1554–1584)

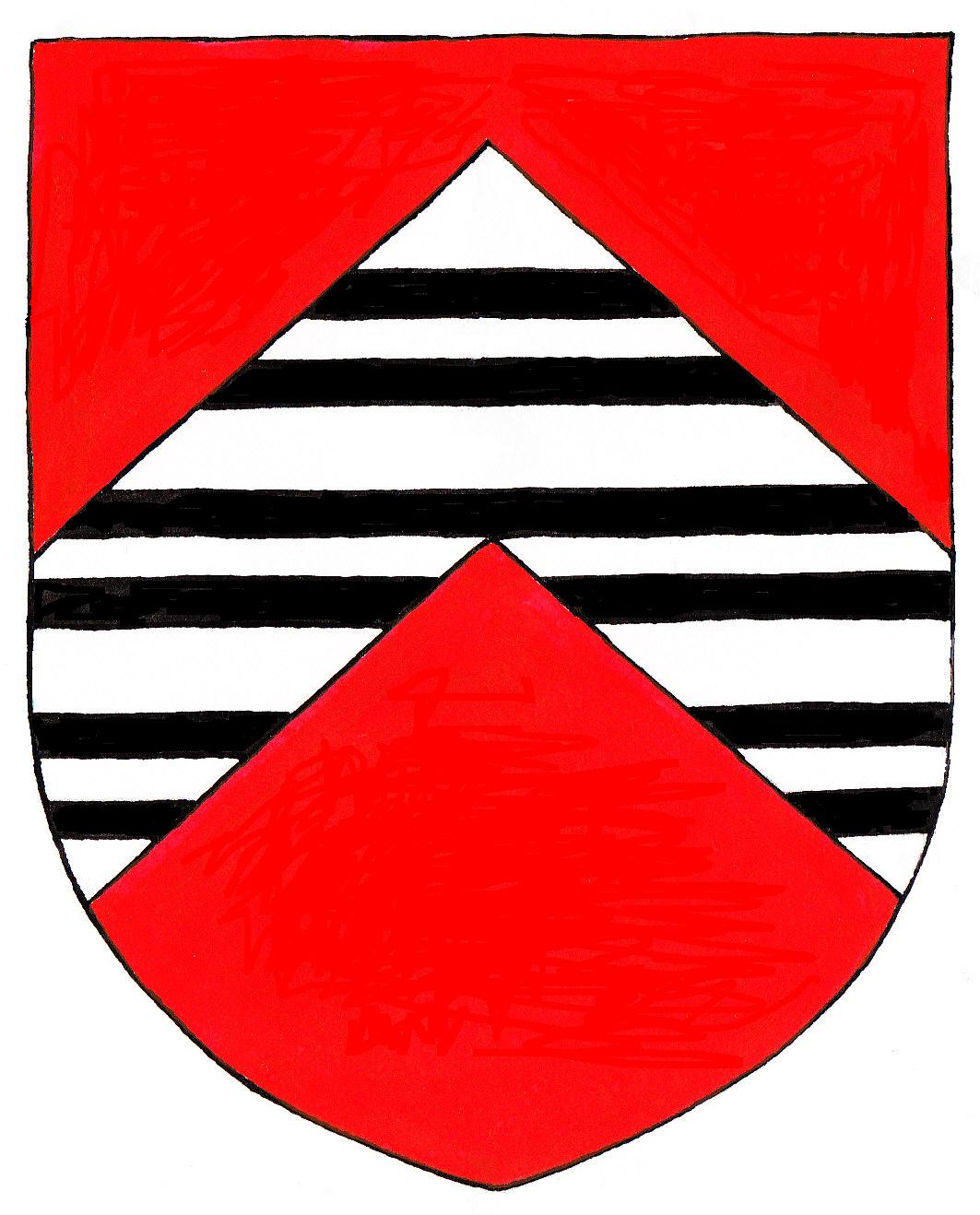
- Arms of Throckmorton: Gules, on a chevron argent three bars gemelles sable. Crest: A falcon rising proper belled and jessed or. Mottos: (1) Virtus Sola Nobilitas (Virtue is the only nobility); (2) Moribus Antiquis (With ancient manners)
- Born: 1554
- Died: July 10, 1584 (aged 29–30); Tyburn, Middlesex
- Cause of death: Hanging
- Education: University of Oxford, Inner Temple, London
- Occupation: Lawyer
- Known for: Throckmorton Plot
- Criminal charges: Treason
- Spouse: Anne Sutton
- Children: John Throckmorton
- Parents: Sir John Throckmorton (father); Margery Puttenham (mother)
- Relatives: Sir Nicholas Throckmorton, Nicholas Vaux, 1st Baron Vaux of Harrowden, Elizabeth Throckmorton George Puttenham, Sir Edward Sutton, 4th Baron Dudley

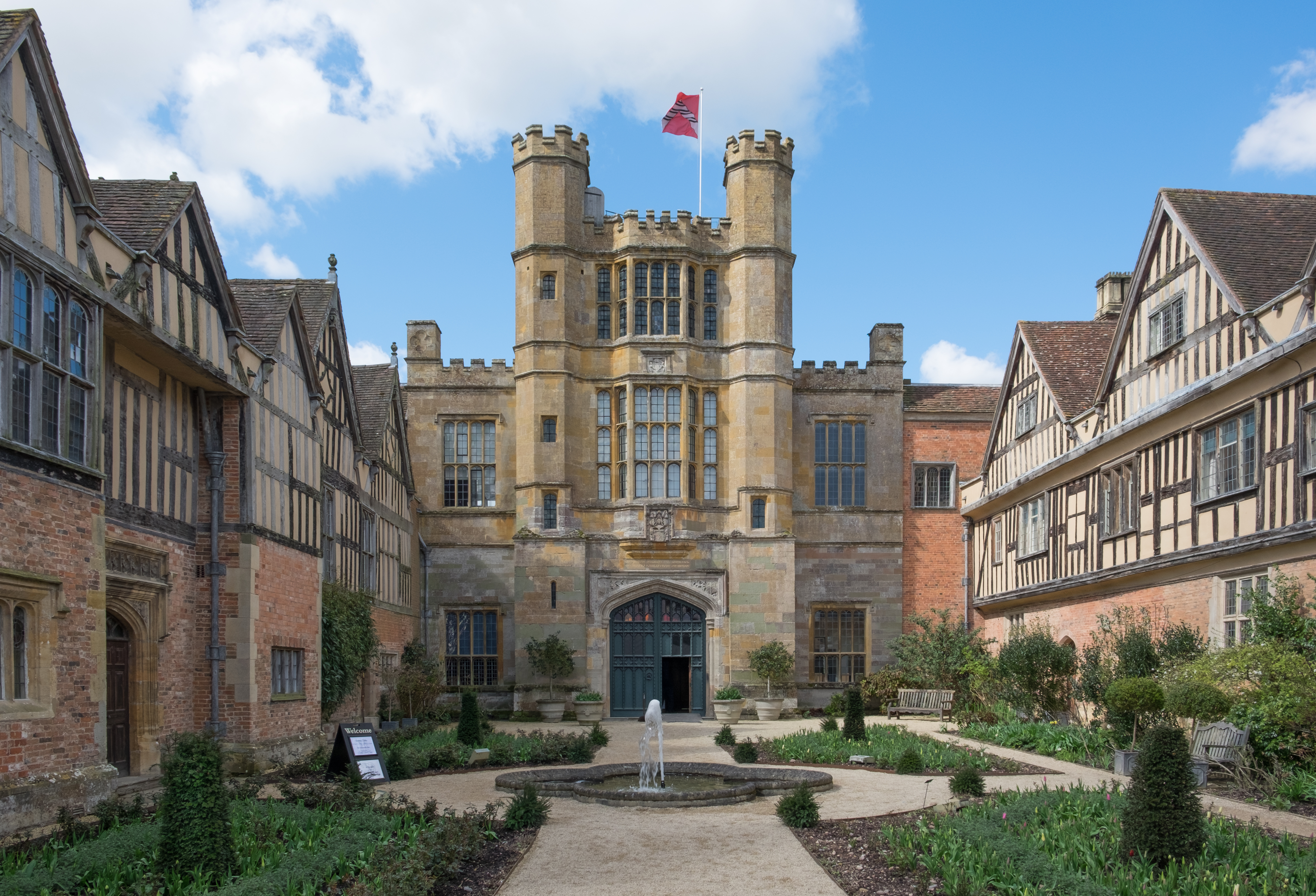
Coughton Court home of Throckmorton family

Sir Francis Throckmorton (1554 – 10 July 1584) was a conspirator against Queen Elizabeth I of England in the Throckmorton Plot.

== Early life ==
He was the son of Sir John Throckmorton, Queen Mary's principal legal counsel, who was himself the seventh out of eight sons of Sir George Throckmorton of Coughton Court, and Margery Puttenham, daughter of Robert Puttenham and sister of George Puttenham. He was a nephew of Sir Nicholas Throckmorton, one of Elizabeth's diplomats, who had held the post of Chief Justice of Chester but was removed in 1579, a year before his death. His paternal grandmother, Katherine Vaux, daughter of Nicholas Vaux, 1st Baron Vaux of Harrowden, was the paternal aunt of the Protestant queen consort of King Henry VIII, Katherine Parr.

In 1567, Throckmorton was betrothed to Anne Sutton, heir to the manors of Sedgely, Himley and Swinford in Staffordshire, and daughter of Sir Edward Sutton, 4th Baron Dudley and Katherine Brydges, who had been one of Queen Mary the I's Gentlewomen of the Privy Chamber, herself the daughter of John Brydges, 1st Baron Chandos, who was Lieutenant of the Tower of London during the reign of Mary I. Through her father, Anne Sutton was second cousin once removed of Elizabeth I, via Elizabeth Woodville.

The year following the betrothal, Anne, who would have been about 11 or 12 at the time, went to Ripford in Worcestershire to be brought up by Throckmorton's mother, Margery. The marriage bond is dated July 1571, though no parish register entry survives. The couple had a son, John, who is mentioned in his grandmother Margery's will of 1591.

Francis Throckmorton was educated from 1572 at Hart Hall, Oxford and entered the Inner Temple in London as a pupil in 1576. In Oxford he had come under the influence of Catholics, and when Edmund Campion and Robert Persons came to England in 1580 to conduct Jesuit propaganda, Francis was one of the members of the Temple who helped them.

== Conspiracy to overthrow Queen Elizabeth I ==
In 1580, Throckmorton, with his brother Thomas, travelled to the European continent and met leading Catholic malcontents from England in Spain and France. It was in Paris that he met Charles Paget and Thomas Morgan, agents of Mary, Queen of Scots. His brother Thomas settled in Paris permanently in 1582.

Following Throckmorton's return to England in 1583, he served as an intermediary for communications between supporters of the Catholic cause on the continent, the imprisoned Mary, Queen of Scots, and the Spanish ambassador Bernardino de Mendoza. The plot intended an invasion of England by a French force under command of the Duke of Guise, or by Spanish and Italian forces sent by Philip II of Spain for the purpose of releasing the imprisoned Mary Queen of Scots and restoring the Catholic Church in England and Wales. Throckmorton occupied a house, on Paul's Wharf in London, which served as a meeting-place for the conspirators.

Throckmorton carried Mary's letters to the French ambassador Michel de Castelnau, Sieur de Mauvissière and his secretary Claude de Courcelles, who resided at Salisbury Court near Fleet Street. In 2023 coded letters from Mary to Castelnau were discovered in the Bibliothèque nationale de France and deciphered. The letters were probably put into cipher by Mary's secretaries Gilbert Curle, Claude Nau, and Jérôme Pasquier. In the ciphered texts Throckmorton was given the codename or alias Monsieur de la Tour. Throckmorton and George More carried letters from the embassy to Mary.

Throckmorton's activities raised the suspicions of Sir Francis Walsingham, Elizabeth I's spymaster and he was arrested in October or in the first week of November in 1583. A search of his house produced incriminating evidence and Throckmorton was taken to Tower of London. After torture upon the rack, he confessed his involvement in a plot to overthrow the Queen and restore the Catholic Church in England. An invasion led by Henry I, Duke of Guise, would have been coupled with an orchestrated uprising of Catholics within the country.

Throckmorton was tried at the Guildhall on 21 May 1584.

== Death ==
Throckmorton later retracted his confession, but other sources of the plot, and a search of his premises, further incriminated him. His arrest led to the end of the conspiracy and the expulsion of the Spanish ambassador. He was convicted of high treason and executed by hanging at Tyburn on 10 July 1584, but on the scaffold he revoked his second confession, calling God to witness that it was drawn from him by the hope of pardon.

An execution ballad called The Lamentation of Englande was published in London later in 1584 which described some details of Throckmorton's crime and execution:

"Throgmorton lately did conspire,
to overthrowe the State:
That Strangers might invade the Realme
upon an Evening late:
And lande in places where he knewe,
the Realme was something weake:
The secret of which thing he did,
to forraine Princes breake.
Pray, pray, etc.

... Even so the Lord by his great might,
my comfort doth maintaine,
In keeping and preserving still,
my Prince from Traitors traine.
And did preserve her from the harmes,
Throgmorton did pretende:
Who even at Tyborne for the same,
did make a shamefull ende. Pray, pray, etc."

In September 1586, Mary, Queen of Scots' servant Jérôme Pasquier was questioned in the Tower of London by Thomas Phelippes. He confessed to writing a letter in cipher for Mary to send to the French ambassador Michel de Castelnau asking him to negotiate a pardon for Francis Throckmorton in a prisoner exchange.

== In film and literature ==
Sir Francis Throckmorton is featured in the film Elizabeth: The Golden Age, where he is played by Steven Robertson. In the film, he is shown asking for help from his cousin, Elizabeth Throckmorton, one of Queen Elizabeth's ladies-in-waiting and later the wife of Sir Walter Raleigh.

Throckmorton's recruitment to act as a courier to Queen Mary and the way he was discovered by Walsingham's agents are depicted in Ken Follett's historical novel A Column of Fire. As depicted in the book, Throckmorton was a minor member of the conspiracy, with the main organiser who recruited him managing to escape undetected.
