= Plague Mass =

Live album by Diamanda Galás
- Released: 1 April 1991
- Recorded: 12 – 13 October 1990
- Venues: Cathedral of St. John the Divine, Tenth Avenue, Morningside Heights, Upper Manhattan, New York City, USA
- Genre: Avant-garde
- Length: 72:52
- Label: Mute
- Producers: Blaise Dupuy; Kurt Munkacsi

Diamanda Galás chronology
Masque of the Red Death (1988)	Plague Mass (1991)	The Singer (1992)

Plague Mass is a live album by American avant-garde artist Diamanda Galás. It was recorded on October 12 and 13, 1990 at the Cathedral of St. John the Divine, New York City and released on April 1, 1991 by record label Mute.

== Background ==
Plague Mass was performed as a culmination of Galás' previous 3 albums about the AIDS epidemic (known as the "Masque of the Red Death" trilogy). Before its eventual performance at the Cathedral of St. John the Divine & commercial release Plague Mass is listed as having been performed "... in Berlin, Basel, the Helsinki Festival, and the Festival delle Colline at the Villa Medicea di Poggio a Cainao in Italy." These performances got Galás publicily denounced by members of the Italian Government for "committing blasphemy against the Roman Catholic Church".

== Content ==
AllMusic described the performance as a "heart-wrenching cry about the physical suffering caused by the AIDS plague being compounded by the shameful arrogance of self-appointed moralists."

== Reception ==
Professional ratings
Review scores
Source	Rating
AllMusic	4.5/5 stars
Q	3/5 stars
Trouser Press	favorable

Trouser Press described it as "sepulchral, breathtakingly dramatic and, in the best possible sense, appalling".

It was placed on Terrorizer's list of the "100 Most Important Albums of the Nineties".

== Track listing ==
No.	Title	Length
1.	"There Are No More Tickets to the Funeral"	13:13
2.	"This Is The Law of the Plague"	11:44
3.	"I Wake Up and I See the Face of The Devil"	5:59
4.	"Confessional (Give Me Sodomy or Give Me Death)"	4:17
5.	"How Shall Our Judgement Be Carried Out Upon the Wicked?"	8:37
6.	"Let Us Praise the Masters of Slow Death"	5:54
7.	"Consecration"	3:44
8.	"Sono L'Antichristo"	3:09
9.	"Cris D'Aveugle (Blind Man's Cry)"	10:00
10.	"Let My People Go"	6:05

Note that the live performance originally included 2 other tracks not present on the official release: "Job:10" and "Lamentations". In the album's liner notes it is said these were excluded due to "...the time limitations of the CD configuration".

== Personnel ==
Credits adapted from the album's liner notes.

=== Musicians ===
- Diamanda Galás – vocals, grand piano, arrangement
- David Linton – drums, percussion
- Blaise Dupuy – electronic keyboards
- Ramón Diaz – electrones percussion
- Michael McGrath – tapes & electronic
- Roy Acuff - arrangement & writing

=== Production ===
- Paul Prestopino – technical engineer
- Simon Nathan – engineer
- Scott Widney – engineer
- DigiDesign – sound tools (recording edited with)

=== Recording ===
- Record Plant Remote – live recording
- Kooster McAllister – mobile recording engineer

=== Stage Production ===
- Chuck Cavanaugh – audio stage manager
- Dan Dryden – live sound mix
- ProMix – sound reinforcement
- Dan Kotlowitz – lighting design
- Charles Atlas – staging, artistic consultation
- Marc Warren – production stage manager
- Eric Osborn – stage manager

=== Packaging & Business ===
- Tom Caravaglia – photographs (booklet, front & back cover)
- David Whyte – consultant to (D. Galás)

"Thanks to Sally Dricks, Barbara Mayer, Linda Greenberg, Aldo Hernandez, Conyars Thompson, Daniel Miller, Peter Wright, Jed Wheeler, Philip Glass, Randy Hansen, Robert Hilferty, Carl Valentino, Michael Flanagan, and Tim Holmes"

"Special Thanks to Beth Bellis of Mute Records"

== Release history ==
Region	Date	Label	Format	Catalog
United Kingdom	1991	Mute	CD, LP	STUMM 83
Germany	1991	Mute	CD, LP	INT 192.724
United States	1991	Mute	CD, CS	9-61043
Japan	1991	Mute	CD	ALCB-300
