= Diamanda Galas (album) =

1984 album by avant-garde artist Diamanda Galás

Studio album by Diamanda Galás
- Released: 1984
- Recorded: October 1981 – February 1984
- Studio: KOPN, Columbia, Missouri, USA; Arch Studios, Berkeley, California, United States
- Genre: Avant-garde
- Length: 32:41
- Label: Metalanguage

Diamanda Galás chronology
| The Litanies of Satan (1982) | Diamanda Galas (1984) | The Divine Punishment (1986) |

Diamanda Galas is the eponymously titled second album by American avant-garde musician Diamanda Galás, released in 1984 by record label Metalanguage.

== Content ==
The album's first track, "Panoptikon" (named after Panopticon, a type of prison building designed to allow all areas of a prison to be seen from one vantage point), deals with imprisonment, isolation, torture and extreme alienation as well as homicidal mania and vengeance. It incorporates tape, electronic manipulations and distortion. It was composed by Diamanda Galas, with additional lyrics from In the Belly of the Beast by criminal and author Jack Abbott.

"Τραγούδια από το Αίμα Εχούv Φονός" (Song from the Blood of Those Murdered), recorded in 1981, consists solely of vocals in numerous vignettes. The recording is similar in texture to "Wild Women With Steak-Knives" from her debut album The Litanies of Satan (1982), but when the latter was hysterical and loud, "Τραγούδια" is slow, ghoulish and mournful. The singer was inspired by the tradition of Greek mourning rites, where women mourn the dead as well as seek revenge for the person responsible for the death. The words of "Τραγούδια" are sung in Greek and refer to the victims of the Greek junta regime that ruled Greece from 1967 to 1974.

== Release ==
Professional ratings
Review scores
| Source | Rating |
|---|---|
| AllMusic | 3/5 stars |

Diamanda Galas was first released in 1984 by record label Metalanguage. In October 2020 Diamanda announced the remastering of the album done by Egyptian mastering engineer Heba Kadry, eventually completed in December 2020. In September 2021 she announced the reissue of the album on CD and LP under her label Intravenal Sound Operations with different artwork, subsequently released on October 28, 2021, after being out of print for 37 years.

== Track listing ==
All lyrics are written by Diamanda Galás; all music is composed by Diamanda Galás and Richard Zvonar.

Side A
| No. | Title | Length |
|---|---|---|
| 1. | "Panoptikon" | 15:22 |

Side B
| No. | Title | Length |
|---|---|---|
| 1. | "Τραγούδια από το Αίμα Εχούv Φονός" (Song from the Blood of Those Murdered) | 17:19 |

== Personnel ==
- Diamanda Galás – vocals

Production and additional personnel

- Phil Brown – mastering
- T.J. Eng – photography
- Ed Herrmann – recording (B1)
- Naomie Kremer – cover art, design
- Larry Ochs – executive producer
- Robert Shumaker – engineering
- Richard Zvonar – tape (A1), electronics (A1), recording (B1)

== Release history ==
| Region | Date | Label | Format | Catalog |
|---|---|---|---|---|
| United States | 1984 | Metalanguage | LP | ML 119 |
| Worldwide | 2021 | Intravenal Sound Operations | CD, LP, digital download, streaming | ISO005 |
