= Defixiones: Will and Testament =

Live album by Diamanda Galás
- Released: 24 November 2003
- Recorded: September 2001–June 2002
- Genre: Avant-garde
- Length: 96:32
- Label: Mute
- Producer: Blaise Dupuy, Diamanda Galás

Diamanda Galás chronology
Malediction and Prayer (1998)	Defixiones: Will and Testament (2003)	La serpenta canta (2003)

Professional ratings
Review scores
Source	Rating
AllMusic	3/5 stars
Pitchfork	8.5/10

Defixiones: Will and Testament is a live studio performance album by avant-garde musician Diamanda Galás, released on 24 November 2003 by Mute Records.

== Track listing ==
All music is composed by Diamanda Galás, except "Hastayim Yasiyorm" by Udi Hrant and "Άνοιξε" by Yannis Papaioannou.

Disc one
No.	Title	Words by	Length
1.	"The Dance: Ter Vogormia"	Siamanto (Atom Yarjanian)	13:02
2.	"The Dance: The Desert (part one)"	Adunis (Ali Ahmad Said)	4:11
3.	"The Dance: The Desert (part two)"	Adunis (Ali Ahmad Said)	5:31
4.	"The Dance: Sevda Zinçiri"	Anonymous	4:20
5.	"The Dance: Holokaftoma"	Pier Paolo Pasolini	4:39
6.	"The Dance: Ter Vogormia (reprise)"	Siamanto (Atom Yarjanian)	2:29
7.	"The Eagle of Tkhuma"	Freydon Bet-Abram (Atturaya)	2:47
8.	"Orders from the Dead"	Diamanda Galás, Dido Sotiriou	11:35

Disc two
No.	Title	Words by	Length
1.	"Hastayim Yasiyorum"	Udi Hrant	4:20
2.	"Σαν πεθάνω στο καράβι" (If I Die on the Boat)	Anonymous	2:37
3.	"Je Rame" (I Am Rowing)	Henri Michaux	9:10
4.	"Epístola a los Transeúntes" (Epistle to the Transients)	César Vallejo	5:33
5.	"Birds of Death"	Galás	5:08
6.	"Άνοιξε" (Open Up)	Yannis Papaioannou	3:14
7.	"Todesfuge" (Death Fugue)	"Todesfuge" by Paul Celan	6:14
8.	"Artémis"	Gérard de Nerval	5:05
9.	"See That My Grave Is Kept Clean"	Blind Lemon Jefferson	6:36

== Personnel ==
- Diamanda Galás – vocals, piano, arrangement, production

Production and additional personnel

- Blaise Dupuy – production, drum programming
- Rex Ray – design
- Austin Young – photography

== Release history ==
Region	Date	Label	Format	Catalog
United Kingdom	2003	Mute	CD	STUMM 205
