= Diamanda Galás =

American singer-songwriter, musician, visual artist and writer (born 1955)

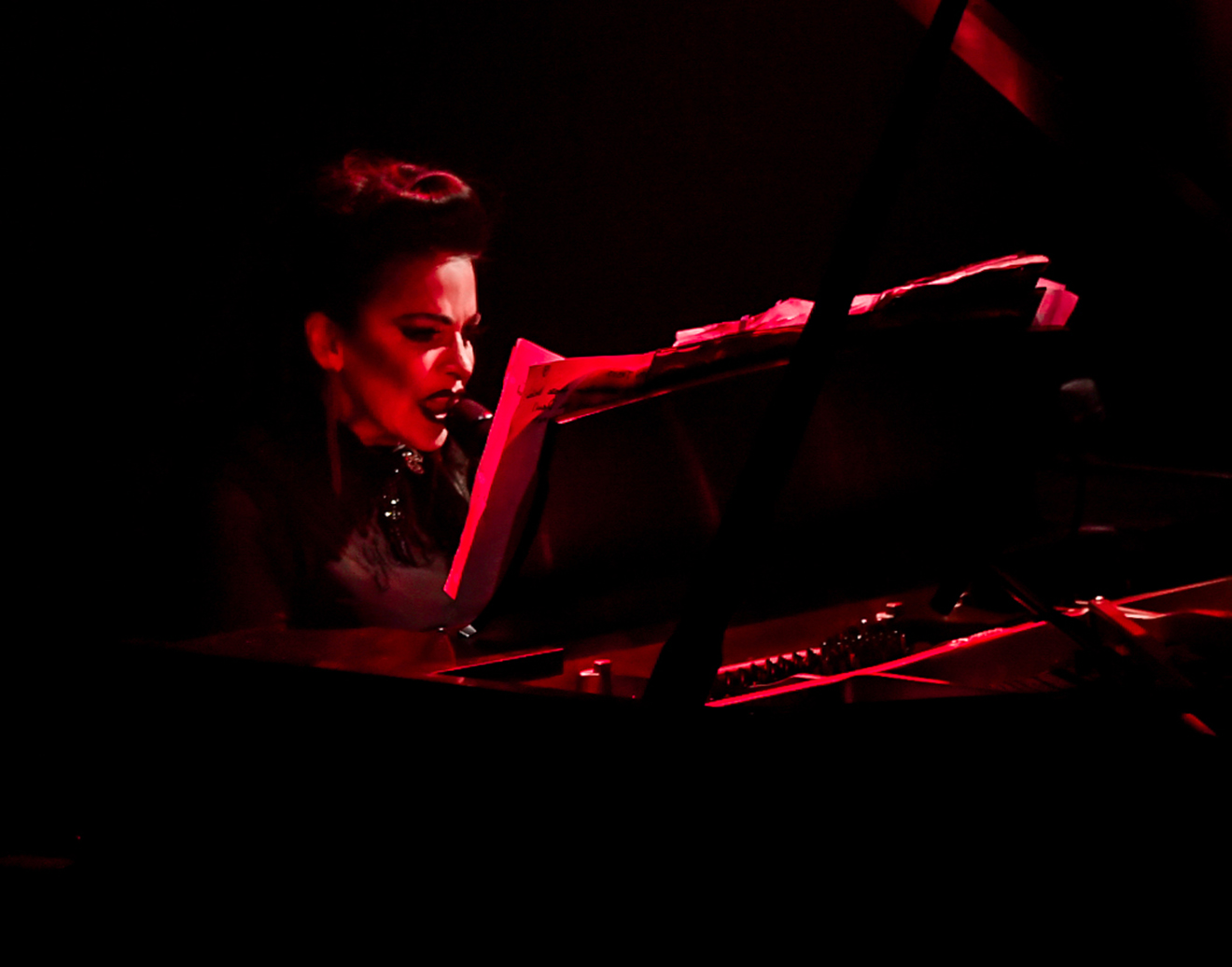
- Galás performing 2016

Background information
- Born: August 29, 1955 (age 71); San Diego, California, U.S.
- Genres: Avant-garde; jazz; blues; gothic rock; classical crossover
- Occupations: Vocalist, keyboardist, composer
- Instruments: Vocals, piano, keyboard, organ
- Years active: 1973–present
- Labels: Mute Records, Intravenal Sound Operations

Diamanda Galás (born August 29, 1955) is an American musician, singer-songwriter, visual artist, and activist. Galás has attracted the attention of the press, particularly for powerful soprano sfogato voice and unorthodox vocal techniques. Her work has ranged from highly experimental work for solo voice, to more conventional interpretations of popular music accompanied by her own piano.

She has been describe as "capable of the most unnerving vocal terror", an "aesthetic revolutionary", "a mourner for the world's victims" and "an envoy of risk, honesty and commitment".

Galás has presented mainly her own work, but her live performances have also included works by other musicians, such as the avant-garde composers Iannis Xenakis and Vinko Globokar, jazz musician Bobby Bradford, saxophonist John Zorn, and Led Zeppelin bassist John Paul Jones. Galás's recordings have also included collaborations, some of which are with the bands Recoil and Erasure, instrumentalist Barry Adamson, and musician Can Oral (also known as Khan), among others.

== Background and education ==
Galás was born and raised in San Diego, California, to a Maniot Greek-American mother from Dover, New Hampshire, Georgianna Koutrelakos-Galás, and an Egyptian Greek father from Lynn, Massachusetts, James Galás. Both parents were Greek Orthodox but considered themselves agnostic. Her father's Greek ancestors were from Smyrna, Pontus, and Chios, while one of his grandmothers was an Egyptian from Alexandria. Galás does not refer to her Smyrniote and Pontic ancestry as "Turkish", but rather as Anatolian.

Galás's first contact with music was during her childhood in San Diego, where her parents lived and worked as teachers. Her father, who was also a gospel choir director, taught her how to play the piano when she was three years old, while introducing her later to classical music, the New Orleans jazz tradition, rebetika and other classics of his Greek heritage, some blues standards, and other historical music genres. Galas also took cello and violin lessons, and studied a wide range of musical forms. By the age of fourteen, she had been playing gigs in San Diego with her father's band, performing Greek and Arabic music, and she had also made her orchestral debut with the San Diego Symphony as the soloist for Beethoven's Piano Concerto No. 1. But while her father encouraged her to play the piano, he did not want her to sing because he believed that singing was for "hookers and idiots."

Galás and her brother Phillip-Dimitri acquired a taste for dark literature at an early age. Their inspirations were the Marquis de Sade, Friedrich Nietzsche, Antonin Artaud, and Edgar Allan Poe.

In the 1970s, Galás studied biochemistry at the University of Southern California, specializing in immunology and hematology studies. Her post-graduate studies include a master's program in the music department of the University of California, San Diego, which encouraged her to work at its Center for Music Experiment to develop her own vocal technique. Outside academia, Galás's vocal training was supported by private lessons in San Diego with bel canto tutor Frank Kelly, and with voice coaches Vicky Hall in Berlin and Barbara Maier Gustern in New York.

== Music ==
=== Early years (1970s–1986) ===
In the early 1970s, Galás and her friend contra-bass player Mark Dresser joined the jazz band Black Music Infinity, which included drummer Stanley Crouch, trumpeter Bobby Bradford, cornetist Butch Morris, flautist James Newton, and saxophonist David Murray. She later collaborated with members of the San Diego band CETA VI, which included, among others, jazz saxophonist Jim French, with whom Galás went on to record and release her first compositions, as part of the album If Looks Could Kill (1979), together with guitarist and sound engineer Henry Kaiser.

At the same time, Galás was preparing for her live solo debut, which took place at the 1979 Festival d'Avignon, in France, where she was doing post-graduate studies. It was a performance of Vinko Globokar's Un Jour Comme un Autre (A Day Like Any Other), an opera based on Amnesty International's documentation about the arrest and torture of a Turkish woman for alleged treason. Globokar was the director of the Instruments and Voice department at the music and sound research center IRCAM (Institut de Recherche et Coordination Acoustique/Musique), where Galás had been doing further experimentation on her vocal technique. During her time in Paris, Galás also met the Greek composer and architect Iannis Xenakis, whose composition Akanthos (1977) she sang with IRCAM's Ensemble InterContemporain in 1980, while she was still in Europe. After her return to the US, Galás performed one more work by Xenakis, his composition N'Shima (1975), in the US premiere of it in New York in 1981, alongside soprano Genevieve Renon-McLaughlin, who sang one of the two vocal parts of this piece.

Her first solo album, The Litanies of Satan (1982), was also an operatic work. It included only two compositions: a twelve-minute piece entitled 'Wild Women with Steak-Knives', which was described by Galás in the album notes as tragedy-grotesque deriving from her work "Eyes Without Blood", and another lengthy composition, 'Litanies of Satan', an adaptation to music of a section from Charles Baudelaire's poem Les Fleurs du Mal. Her second album, Diamanda Galas (1984), also contained two lengthy compositions. They were 'Panoptikon', which was dedicated to Jack Henry Abbott, whose 1981 autobiographical book In the Belly of the Beast described his experience of the prison system, and 'Tragoudia Apo To Aima Exoun Fonos' ('Song From the Blood of Those Murdered'), a Greek-language piece dedicated to those political prisoners who were either murdered or executed during the Greek military regimes in the years 1967–74.

=== Mute Records (1986–2008) ===
Galás began writing and performing on the subject of AIDS around 1984, while living in San Francisco. This theme resulted in the trilogy Masque of the Red Death, an operatic trilogy which included The Divine Punishment (1986), Saint of the Pit (1986) and You Must Be Certain of the Devil (1988). In these three works Galás detailed the suffering of people with AIDS. Shortly after the recording of the trilogy's first volume began, her brother, playwright Philip-Dimitri Galás, became sick with AIDS, which inspired her to join activist groups that raised awareness about this new illness. Her brother died in 1986, just before the completion of the trilogy.

Taking a break from her own recordings, Galás appeared on the 1989 studio album Moss Side Story by Barry Adamson (formerly of Magazine and Nick Cave and the Bad Seeds). In Moss Side Story, which was described by the press as a "soundtrack for a non-existent film-noir", Galás sang the opening track, 'On the Wrong Side of Relaxation'. In 1992, Galás released the album Vena Cava, a series of unaccompanied voice pieces recorded in New York during a live performance at The Kitchen. For her next record, Galás changed stylistic direction by turning to the blues tradition and interpreting a wide range of songs with only a piano and solo voice. This stylistic turn produced the studio album The Singer (1992), on which she covered songs by Willie Dixon, Roy Acuff, and Screamin' Jay Hawkins, as well as "Gloomy Sunday", a song written by Hungarian pianist and composer Rezső Seress in 1933 and translated into English by Desmond Carter. This material formed the basis of the video Judgement Day, which was released in 1993.

In the next three years, Galás returned to collaborations with other musicians. She first worked with Led Zeppelin bassist John Paul Jones, a longtime admirer of her work, to write material for a record, and the album The Sporting Life was produced with him in 1994. A tour that followed the album's release saw the two musicians performing together live on stage as well as on the popular MTV show The Jon Stewart Show. Then, in the same year, two of Galás's songs from her previous album were featured on the soundtrack for Oliver Stone's film Natural Born Killers. In 1995, Galás contributed vocals to the eponymous album of British synth-pop duo Erasure at the invitation of the lead singer, Andy Bell, and the following year she took part in the album Closed on Account of Rabies, a tribute to Edgar Allan Poe which also included Iggy Pop, Debbie Harry and Marianne Faithfull, who lent their voices to the tales of the legendary author. Galás' reading of "The Black Cat" was the longest recording on the compilation.

In 1998, Galás released Malediction and Prayer, which was recorded live in 1996 and 1997. In 2000, Galás worked with Recoil by contributing her voice to the album Liquid. She was the lead vocalist on the album's first single, "Strange Hours", for which she also wrote the lyrics, and can be heard on "Jezebel" and "Vertigen" as a backing vocalist.

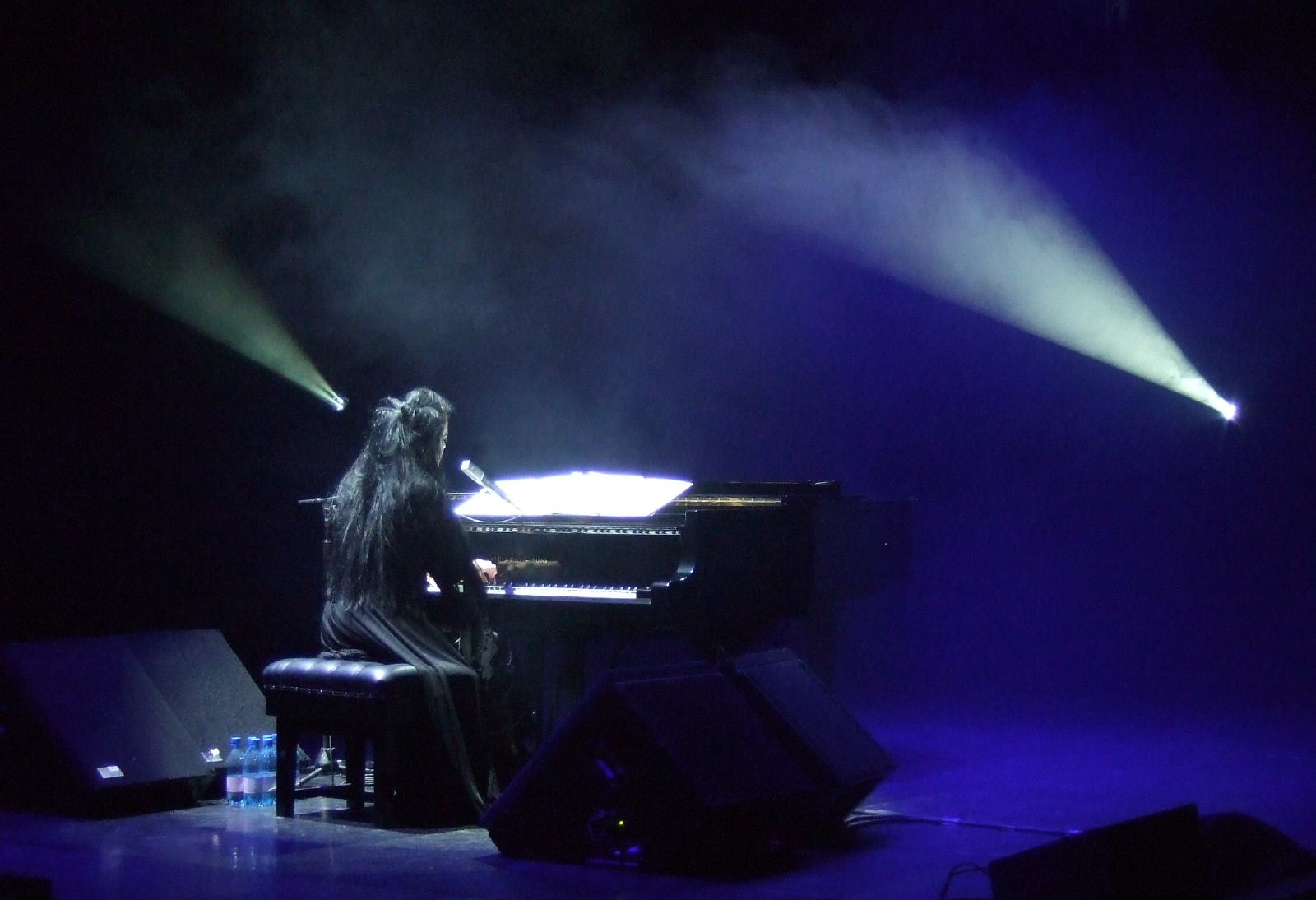
Diamanda Galás at the QE Hall in London

Galás's next project revolved around the Armenian, Anatolian-Greek and Assyrian genocides that occurred between 1914 and 1923. This work took the title 'Defixiones – Will and Testament' in reference to the last wishes of the dead who had been taken to their graves under extreme circumstances, as 'defixiones' in Greece and Asia Minor is associated with the warnings written on gravestones by relatives of the dead to warn people against desecrating them. This material formed part of the 80-minute long album Defixiones: Will and Testament (2003), which was released simultaneously with La Serpenta Canta (2003), a live album including cover versions recorded between May 1999 and November 2002. One of the unaccompanied vocal pieces from Defixiones: Will and Testament (2003), "Orders from the Dead", was later used on the album Aealo (2010) by Greek black metal band Rotting Christ.

In 2008, Galás released her seventh live album, Guilty Guilty Guilty, a collection of cover songs that she used to play as a piano accompanist in her father's band when she was young. The album emerged from material she began to work on around the time when her parents – to whom it is dedicated – happened to stay in the same hospital at the same time for different treatments; seeing how they handled it and how they held hands and took courage from each other during that time reminded her of the love songs she had learned in her father's band. Galás has stated that these songs also made her explore her own emotions at a time when a long-term personal relationship had ended, particularly Henderson's and Brown's "The Thrill Is Gone", a song performed by Chet Baker and others. This set of new re-interpretations of old, love songs was recorded live at Galás's Valentine's Day concert at New York's Knitting Factory in 2006.

=== Intravenal Sound Operations (2009–present) ===
After 2009 Galás found herself without a record deal, and until 2016 she was remixing and remastering her earlier works as well as recording some new songs which were made available online digitally as self-released singles. Galás's focus in this period was on regaining ownership and control of her entire catalogue, since the selling of her records by Mute to EMI, which passed them to BMG, had made Galás's back catalogue unavailable. In the meantime, two new albums, All the Way (2017) and At Saint Thomas the Apostle Harlem (2017), were released simultaneously through her own label, Intravenal Sound Operations, and a world tour followed.

In 2019, Galás regained the rights of her back catalogue and her discography was made available again. The result was the release of a remastered version of her debut album The Litanies of Satan (1982), which had been originally released on Y Records. This was followed by the 21-minute piano work De-formation: Piano Variations (2020), which was based on music for the 1912 poem Das Fieberspital (The Fever Hospital) by the German expressionist writer Georg Heym. As work on remastering her previous releases continued, Galás made available another two remastered works: her albums Diamanda Galas (1984) and The Divine Punishment (1986), which came out in October 2021 and in June 2022 respectively.

In August 2022, Galás released the studio album Broken Gargoyles. The first incarnation of the work was played in July 2021 as a sound installation at the Nikolaikapelle (former Kapellen Leprosarium – Leper Sanctuary) in Hanover, Germany. Earlier versions had been performed at the Dark Mofo festival and other live music events, and sections of it had also been included in different multi-media installations. The inspiration came from a pre-First World War poem by the German poet Georg Heym that Galás came across in a book about German expressionist art and poetry. This led her to other cultural artefacts from the period, including a 1924 book by anti-war campaigner Ernst Friedrich of photographs showing soldiers with damaged faces, which were also responsible for the album title, as 'gargoyles' was a term used by hospital staff to refer to those soldiers. The album comprises two long pieces titled 'Mutilatus' and 'Abiectio'.

On 14 June 2024, a new album of live recordings was released. Titled Diamanda Galás in Concert (2024), it contained a selection of songs from her 2017 performances at Thalia Hall in Chicago and Neptune Theatre in Seattle. They were both previously unreleased songs as well as different versions of material from earlier albums. In September 2024, Galás released a remastered version of her album Saint of the Pit (1986).

== Art ==
=== Performance art ===
Although Galás found herself in the mid-70s studying and practicing music and performance in the West Coast, where performance artists tended to be much more reliant on text and closer to the theatrical event than their European and East-Coast counterparts, her use of text did not restrict her performances to a script, as her introduction of electronically processed sounds shifted her attention towards vocal improvisation to allow more freedom. Her first public performances at New York's The Kitchen and the 1980 Moers Festival reflect this direction, and works such as 'Wild Women with Steak-Knives' and 'Panoptikon', which were developed in this period and used heavily the improvisation element and vocal experimentation, were later recorded and released as music records for her first two solo albums in 1982 and 1984 respectively.

In 1990, Galás selected material from her AIDS trilogy and created a performance piece for the Cathedral of St. John the Divine in New York. With a theme addressing the Roman Catholic Church's indifference to sufferers of HIV and Galás's introduction of theatrical props, such as artificial blood and special lights, her performance, for some members of her audience, "combined ululating shrieks, whispers and howls with an intensity that left the audience stunned. The performance was documented in photographs and audio, and a live album was released under the title Plague Mass in 1991.

=== Painting ===
Galás has stated that, for her, painting acts as "an exorcism of that which is troubling [her] deeply", and that the visual language she uses allows her "to paint an analogue of the experience, the misery, and therefore get rid of it for the time being. But only because of that vocabulary", she adds. Commentators suggest that Galás's paintings look to the past by presenting stylistic similarities with artworks by Expressionist artists such as Edvard Munch, Paul Klee and Jean Dubuffet. One of the Expressionist artists that Galás mentions as influential to her is the Austrian painter and playwright Oskar Kokoschka, especially with his short play Murderer, the Hope of Women (1909), which has very little text but creates 'explosions' by being immensely expressive. Galás has also been compared to the artist David Wojnarowicz, whose work is seen as falling within the wider limits of neo-expressionism, for the similarities in which they invite horror through immediate and explicit expression. For Galás, the visual art that she does "has the same impulse and subject material" as her music, because she cannot interrupt the creative process when working on a subjects, "so these are simply different treatments of similar subjects." Many of Galás's paintings often borrow their subjects from themes she has explored in her performances and recordings, looking back to the same historical events that have been inspiring her to write lyrics and compose music, as is made apparent by the use of titles such as 'Ragip:Turkish Prison for Infidels', 'Medusa', 'Artemis', Cleopatra', 'Mani: Me Epifilakzin – Salt Maketh A Man Who Fears No God' and 'Ethiopian Martyr/Amharic Brother to Greek Orthodox, Egyptian Coptic and Palestinian Orthodox', among others.

In 2011, Galás donated a painting to the Coilhouse International Fundraising Silent Auction, which was part of The Black & White & Red All Over Ball organized by New York's digital and print magazine, and corresponding blog, Coilhouse. Galás's work was a luminescent, or a 'glow-in-the-dark fabric painting', as described by the magazine editors, featuring "mysterious and ferocious organic shapes painted on a thick piece of black fabric and adorned with a bright prism″.

=== Installation ===
In 1988, Galás provided the music to the audiovisual installation Faded Wallpaper (1988) by British artist Tina Keane, which included a neon sign and a video work that featured, among other material, extracts from Charlotte Perkins Gilman's 1892 story 'The Yellow Wallpaper'.

In 2010, a four-minute video artwork entitled A Fire in My Belly (1992), which was made using a composition by Galás from her album Plague Mass (1991) and a film by the artist David Wojnarowicz, was featured in the exhibition Hide/Seek at Smithsonian's National Portrait Gallery. The artwork was deemed by some groups to be controversial and it was removed from that show, with Galas immediately responding to the Smithsonian's removal with a written statement that was circulated in the press.

In 2011, Galás collaborated with Soviet dissident artist Vladislav Shabalin on Aquarium, a sound installation inspired by the environmental disaster in the Gulf of Mexico. The event took place at Leonhardskirche in Basel (Switzerland) from June 12 to 19. Aquarium was then installed at the church of San Francesco in Udine (Italy), at the festival "Vicino/Lontano", from May 9 to 12, 2013.

In July 2020, Galás presented via Fridman Gallery's online space a work inspired by poetry and visuals related to physical and mental scars in soldiers who were injured in the First World War. With collaborators such as artist and sound engineer Daniel Neumann, video artist Carlton Bright, and artist Robert Knocke on a guest appearance, Galás produced 'Broken Gargoyles', an installation based on the words of German poet Georg Heym and on photographs by Ernst Friedrich.

== Films ==
In 1984, Galás made a voice cameo appearance, performing the voices for the Japanese assassins and flying weapons in Cannon Films' Ninja III: The Domination. This was followed by three more film appearances: she made the voice of the witch in John Milius's Conan the Barbarian (1982 film), the voice of the dead in Wes Craven's film The Serpent and the Rainbow, and also offered her voice to Francis Ford Coppola's 1992 film, Bram Stoker's Dracula, adding erotically charged moans, breathless sighs, and high-pitched shrieks. She also contributed the song "Exeloume" to the film. In 1995, Galás was commissioned to record a cover version of the Schwartz-Dietz song "Dancing in the Dark" for Clive Barker's film Lord of Illusions, and her song appeared during the closing credits.

While two of her earlier recordings, "Le Treizième Revient" and "Exeloume", appeared on the soundtrack to Derek Jarman's The Last of England (1987), Galás herself also made an appearance in a film, as in 1990 she took part in Rosa von Praunheim's documentary Positive about AIDS in the New York gay scene.

In 2011, Galás premiered Schrei 27, a film made in collaboration with Italian filmmaker Davide Pepe. It was based on Schrei X, a 1994 radio piece which was a co-commission to Galás by New American Radio and the Walker Art Center, and it has been described as an "unrelenting" portrait of a body suffering torture in a medical facility.

Most recently, Galás contributed work to James Wan's 2013 horror film, The Conjuring, and her composition "Free Among the Dead" from the album The Divine Punishment (1986) was featured in Zoe Mavroudi's documentary, Ruins: Chronicle of an HIV Witch-Hunt (2013).

== Awards ==
In 2005, Galás was awarded Italy's prestigious Demetrio Stratos International Career Award.

== Activism ==
Galás's commitment to addressing social issues and her involvement in collective action has made her concentrate on themes such as AIDS, mental illness, despair, loss of dignity, political injustice, historical revisionism, and war crimes. She has campaigned for AIDS education and the rights of those diagnosed. In 1986, Galás's brother, playwright Philip-Dimitri Galás, died from AIDS, and this inspired her to join the AIDS activist group ACT UP. Her subsequent involvement in ACT UP's Stop the Church demonstration resulted in her arrest on December 10, 1989, inside Saint Patrick's Cathedral. The group was protesting Cardinal O'Connor's opposition to AIDS education and to the distribution of condoms in public schools. She was among 53 people arrested that day.

== Cultural references ==
Galás was mentioned in Michael Kustow's autobiographical book One in Four (1987), which uses the form of a journal to tell the author's story for the year 1986, when he was working as a Commissioning Editor for the Arts in the British TV station Channel Four. Galás's name does not appear directly in the book, but several references to her are made in a conversation between the author and the owner of the independent music label Some Bizzare Records Stevo Pearce, such as the use of cutting-edge technology in her live performances, her singing technique, and her Greek heritage. The following dialogue between these two persons illustrates best how this is an indirect mention of Galás:

My label's called Some Bizzare. ... I've got the best f***ing TV show you'll ever see. Drama, video art, music, films made by the bands themselves. You'll get ratings. Innovation? I can give Channel Four all the innovation it wants. Greek singer, for example. She wears twenty contact microphones round her body, like necklaces, she's an opera singer, it's pure unaccompanied transformed voice. It'll drive your viewers crazy!

== Critical analyses ==
Musicologist Susan McClary has written about Galás in her study Feminist Endings: Music, Gender, and Sexuality (2002). McClary looks at Galás's work in a discussion about the representation of women in famous operas as an example of how Galás's approach confronts the narrow portrayal of women in those works and how she renovated the operatic tradition with subjects created through enactment.

Art historian Nicholas Chare discusses the concert performance Todesfuge (Death's Fugue) by Diamanda Galás in his study Auschwitz and Afterimages: Abjection, Witnessing and Representation (2011). Chare is interested in the Holocaust and representations of it in painting, photography, musical performance and museum artefacts, so in the section where he examines how Galás has transformed the words in the poem Todesfuge, which was written by the Romanian-born German-language poet Paul Celan, he looks at her work to investigate the relationship between style and horror in music, poetry and art.

== Influences ==
Galás has cited multiple artists as influences on her music, including Maria Callas, Annette Peacock, Patty Waters, John Lee Hooker, Johnny Cash, Ray Charles, and Jimi Hendrix. She is additionally influenced greatly by Greek and Middle Eastern styles of singing, and also blues music. Galás has also expressed admiration for the comedian Don Rickles, who she has called "my hero", as well as the work of poets such as Henri Michaux and Georg Heym, and an array of other musicians, including Chet Baker, Doris Day, The Supremes, Gladys Knight, Miki Howard, Whitney Houston, Amy Winehouse and Adele.

== Discography ==
Year	Albums
1982	The Litanies of Satan (Studio)
1984	Diamanda Galas (Studio)
1986	The Divine Punishment (Studio)
1986	Saint of the Pit (Studio)
1988	You Must Be Certain of the Devil (Studio)
1991	Plague Mass (Live)
1992	The Singer (Studio)
1993	Vena Cava (Live)
1994	The Sporting Life (Studio)
1996	Schrei x (Studio and Live)
1998	Malediction and Prayer (Live)
2003	Defixiones: Will and Testament (Studio and Live)
2003	La serpenta canta (Live)
2008	Guilty Guilty Guilty (Live)
2017	All the Way (Studio and Live)
2017	At Saint Thomas the Apostle Harlem (Live)
2020	De-formation: Piano Variations (EP) (Studio)
2022	Broken Gargoyles (Studio)
2024	Diamanda Galás In Concert (Live)
2025	De-formation: Second Piano Variations (Live)

Compilation albums

- 1988 – The Divine Punishment & Saint of the Pit
- 1988 – Masque of the Red Death (The Divine Punishment, Saint of the Pit & You Must Be Certain of the Devil)

Singles

- 1988 – Double-Barrel Prayer
- 1994 – Do You Take This Man? (with John Paul Jones)
- 2009 – A Soul That's Been Abused
- 2009 – Gloomy Sunday
- 2009 – Pardon Me, I've Got Someone To Kill
- 2009 – You Don't Know What Love Is
- 2009 – O Death
- 2009 – I Put A Spell On You (with Digitalism)
- 2010 – The Black Cat
- 2010 – Tengo que Subir al Puerto (Canto de las Montañas)
- 2010 – Fernand
- 2010 – All The Way
- 2010 – Orders From The Dead (with Rotting Christ)
- 2011 – Άνοιξε Πέτρα (Anoixe Petra)
- 2011 – Birds Of Death
- 2011 – La Sierra de Armenia
- 2011 – Clash Of The Titans (with Choronzon)
- 2021 – Die Stunde Kommt (Live At The Murmrr Theater Brooklyn 2017)

== Long-form videos ==
- 1986 – The Litanies of Satan (VHS)
- 1993 – Judgement Day (VHS)

== Promotional videos ==
- 1988 – Double-Barrel Prayer
- 1994 – Do You Take This Man?

== Books ==
- 1996 – The Shit of God. London and New York: High Risk/Serpent's Tail, 1996.
- 2017 – "Morphine & Others", featured in Outside: An Anthology, edited by Doron Hamburger & Amir Naaman. Berlin: Ash Pure Press, 2017.
