= Francis Cutting =

English lutenist and composer

Francis Cutting (c.1550–1595/6) was an English lutenist and composer of the Renaissance period. He is best known for "Packington's Pound" and a variation of "Greensleeves" called "Divisions on Greensleeves", both pieces originally intended for the lute.

Cutting was employed as a musician for the Howard family, which included Philip Howard, earl of Arundel. Little is known of the composer's early life, but he had ten children with his wife, Elizabeth, eight of whom appear in the parish registers of St Clement Danes, Westminster, the parish in which Arundel House, the London residence of the Howards, was located.

Cutting is among the earliest English lute composers whose names are known. Several of his forty surviving works appear in William Barley's A New Booke of Tabliture (1596); his compositions include "Sir Walter Raleigh's Galliard," "Sir Fulke Greville's Pavan," and "Mrs Anne Markham's Pavan and Galliard". "His surviving music is of high quality, comprising about 51 lute pieces, two bandora solos and one consort part for bandora: an output exceeded only by Dowland, Bacheler and Holborne." The diplomat William Trumbull compiled a manuscript anthology of lute music which includes works by the Bassano family and Francis Cutting.

== Thomas Cutting ==
His son, Thomas Cutting, became a distinguished lutenist himself. He worked for Arbella Stuart. In March 1608, Anne of Denmark, Prince Henry, and the courtier John Elphinstone wrote to her at Sheffield to request that Thomas Cutting be sent to the queen's brother Christian IV of Denmark. Arbella reluctantly agreed. Thomas Cutting subsequently joined Prince Henry's household.
