= Execution ballad =

Ballad on the execution of a criminal

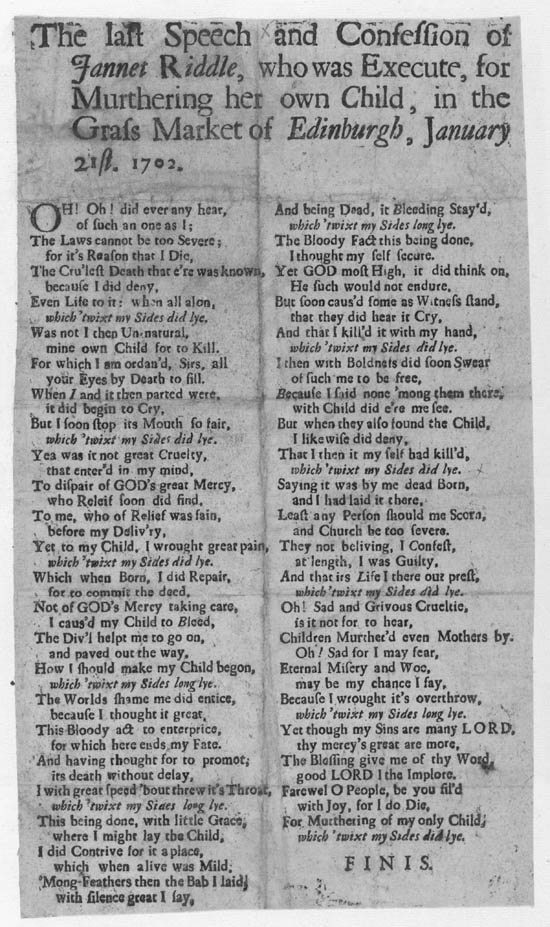
An execution ballad detailing a fictionalized last speech of a Jannet Riddle, who was executed in 1702

An execution ballad is a type of ballad that details the execution of a prisoner or criminal. They were a popular form of street literature from the 1500s to the 1800s across Europe, and some were still being written until World War II. These ballads often contained lurid descriptions of violence, treating the death of the subject as a gruesome warning to the public about the potential consequences of committing a crime. They were sold as broadsides and pamphlets by roving street vendors, often on the day of the execution or the following days. There was usually no written music notation, only a direction that the ballad should be sung to the tune of a certain popular song.

== Composition ==
The use of song was a popular method of spreading news across a community in early modern Europe; music and lyrics were easier to remember, and thus made it easier to spread than written news, as many people were illiterate during the height of its popularity.

The subject of the ballad usually spoke in first-person or, sometimes, in the third-person. They were modeled as if they were the last words of the criminal being executed. The person was always portrayed as undoubtedly guilty of the crime and remorseful for their actions, emphasizing the warning to the listener to learn from their mistakes and making an appeal to God to save their souls. An account of their life is provided, from their parents' upbringing to their following descent into crime. According to the ballads, petty crimes, like alcoholism or gambling, were a gateway to the person's more serious offenses, like murder or treason, that resulted in their execution. After the historical description is provided, the execution will then commence.

Use of the contrafactum is highly utilized during the 16th to 17th century but had dwindled in commonality after the 18th century, likely because of the contemporary audience's familiarity with the song's lyrical cues. The lyrics to the song often clue in the readers as to what the melody could be, often referencing famous melodies at the time. The tune of the melody is intended in evoke a specific feeling or reaction in the reader upon the execution of the criminal.

Execution ballads from the early modern period briefly mention the trial proceedings leading to the verdict before the accused was condemned to the gallows. Some Italian ballads even omitted the warning entirely and detail the death of the executed.

== Formatting ==
=== English ballads ===
Typical English ballads are printed in a broadside format with a woodcut image appearing on one side of the sheet. By the nineteenth century, the size of the ballads became smaller and added one or more unrelated songs to the sheet. Songs like these could also appear in a larger set of broadside ballads. The use of contrafactum in these ballads is based on popular melodies at the time, like 'Packington's Pound' or 'Fortune my Foe'. They have also been used as satire pieces, mocking the Papists for their belief in Catholicism, typically set in an upbeat melody.

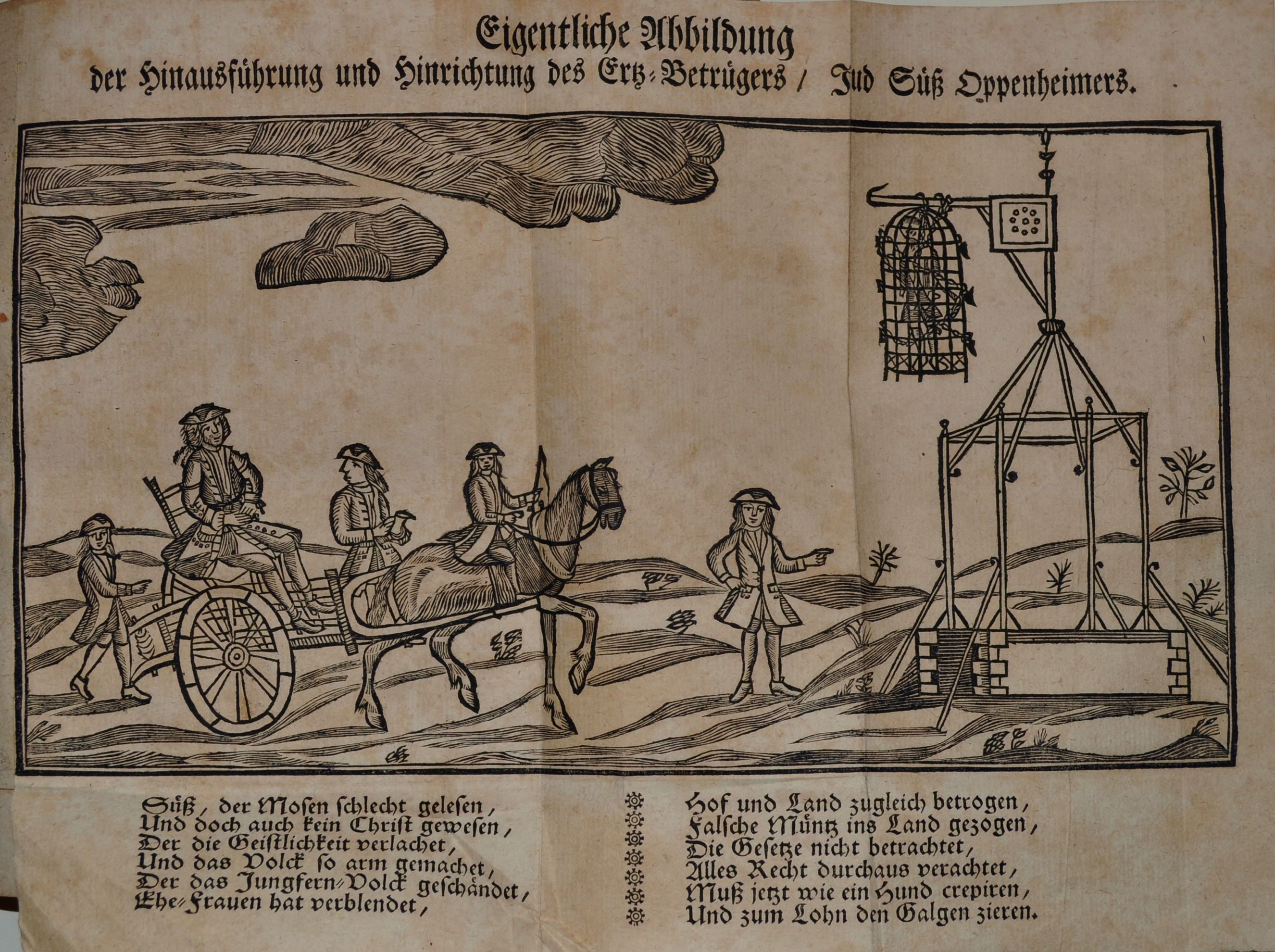
German ballad on the execution of Joseph Süß Oppenheimer, 1738

=== German ballads ===
German ballads can either be in the broadside format with detailed woodcut images or be sold in a quarto pamphlet with an imageless title page, usually signifying two other songs inside. These ballads were usually set to the tune of vernacular hymns and chorales. Lutherans, Anabaptists, and Mennonites are credited with being among the active composers of execution ballads during the late fifteenth century. Their contrafacta are based on the songs in the Ausbund and use the same choral tunes as the Lutherans.

=== Italian ballads ===
Italian ballads are sold in a quarto pamphlet with only one song per pamphlet. It has a woodcut image that is unrelated to the songs inside. Unlike most execution ballads in Europe, Italian ballads provide no tune direction, and the melody is only hinted at by the structure of the ballad. Execution ballads in Italy come in three forms:

When the execution is related to a noble person, it is styled as a terza rima form. It is usually given in the first-person perspective of their confession. The noble person always repents their deeds and is commonly portrayed as a sympathetic figure to the audience. The ottava rima form is usually given to everyday criminals. These ballads were written with the linear chronology of the person before their execution. The criminal is depicted as a very evil figure who is not supposed to be sympathized by the readers. Finally, those written in the barzelletta form are related to criminals who belonged to what contemporary readers thought were already outsiders to the community, like the Moors or Jewish people, and were written in a mocking and lively way.

=== Dutch Ballads ===
Dutch ballads usually appeared in a single sheet with a landscape orientation, containing many songs of a variety of content. These ballads were collected and reprinted as songbooks called 'beggar song books' (Dutch: Guezeliede Boecxken). Secular songs were also used as contrafacta in Dutch ballads. Anabaptists also composed these ballads, detailing the execution of their martyrs and of fellow Anabaptists during the 1550s through 1570s.

=== French Ballads ===
French ballads were also printed on a single sheet of paper. They were also reprinted in songbook compendiums with other ballads from a variety of topics. They also used popular melodies at the time, like the 'air du maréchal de Saxe'. They also use the ballads as a tool to celebrate the death of the Huguenots, making fun of them by using nursery rhymes as the tune for their execution ballads.

== History ==
=== 16th to 17th century ===
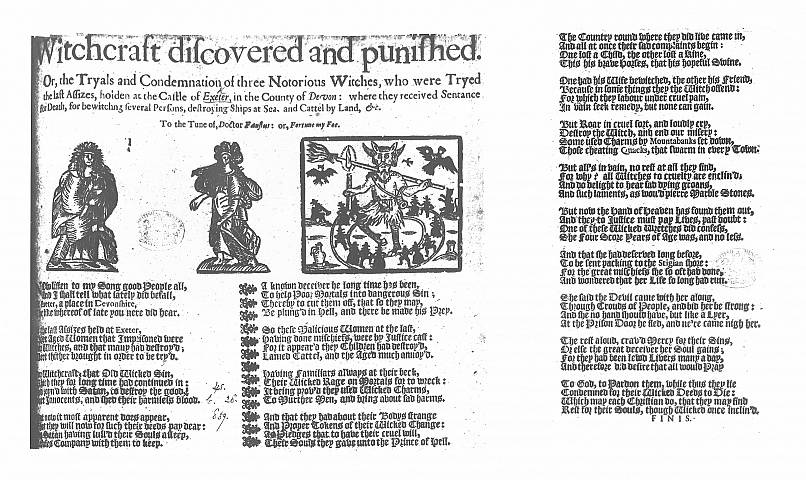
English ballad on the execution of three witches in Exeter, 1682

During the early sixteenth century, execution ballads provided executions due to differences in religious beliefs. These ballads happened during the Protestant Reformation after Martin Luther publicized of the Ninety-five Theses. The liturgical songs, such as psalmodies and hymnals, were used as contrafacta on ballads regarding the death of heretics. These songs often come in two forms: The ones often made by the punished, such as the Protestants, who praised them as martyrs to their cause, and those who condemned those whom they deemed as heretics.

During the sixteenth and seventeenth centuries, execution ballads pertaining to heresy and witchcraft became a popular subject. As such, most ballads during this time revolved around the execution of people for their heretical beliefs and those who were scapegoated following the European wars of religion. Millenarianism by the Reformers brought beliefs about the apocalypse and that all negative events, such as executions, that happened were inferred as a sign of God's wrath and Satan's wrongdoings in balladry.

It also saw the difference in beliefs in different regions in the ballads. While Germany is known to punish men and women with mass burnings, England only prosecuted individual women or groups of women, while France was more concerned with witchcraft and poisonings during the second half of the 16th century. It also saw the diversity of approach in song. Ballads made by Calvinists frequently used the metrical psalms translated by John Calvin, who commissioned Louis Bourgeois to make original compositions of the new psalms.

The earliest known execution ballad of a martyr dates back to the time when Anne Askew was burned at the stake in 1546, depicting her as a soldier of Christ ready to die for Him. In England and France, Ballads were written that mock people of other religions, most commonly the Protestants and the Huguenots. These ballads were composed with childlike lyrics, mostly using repetitive phrases and simple meters to convey childhood innocence, and set to the tune of contemporary nursery rhymes and branles.

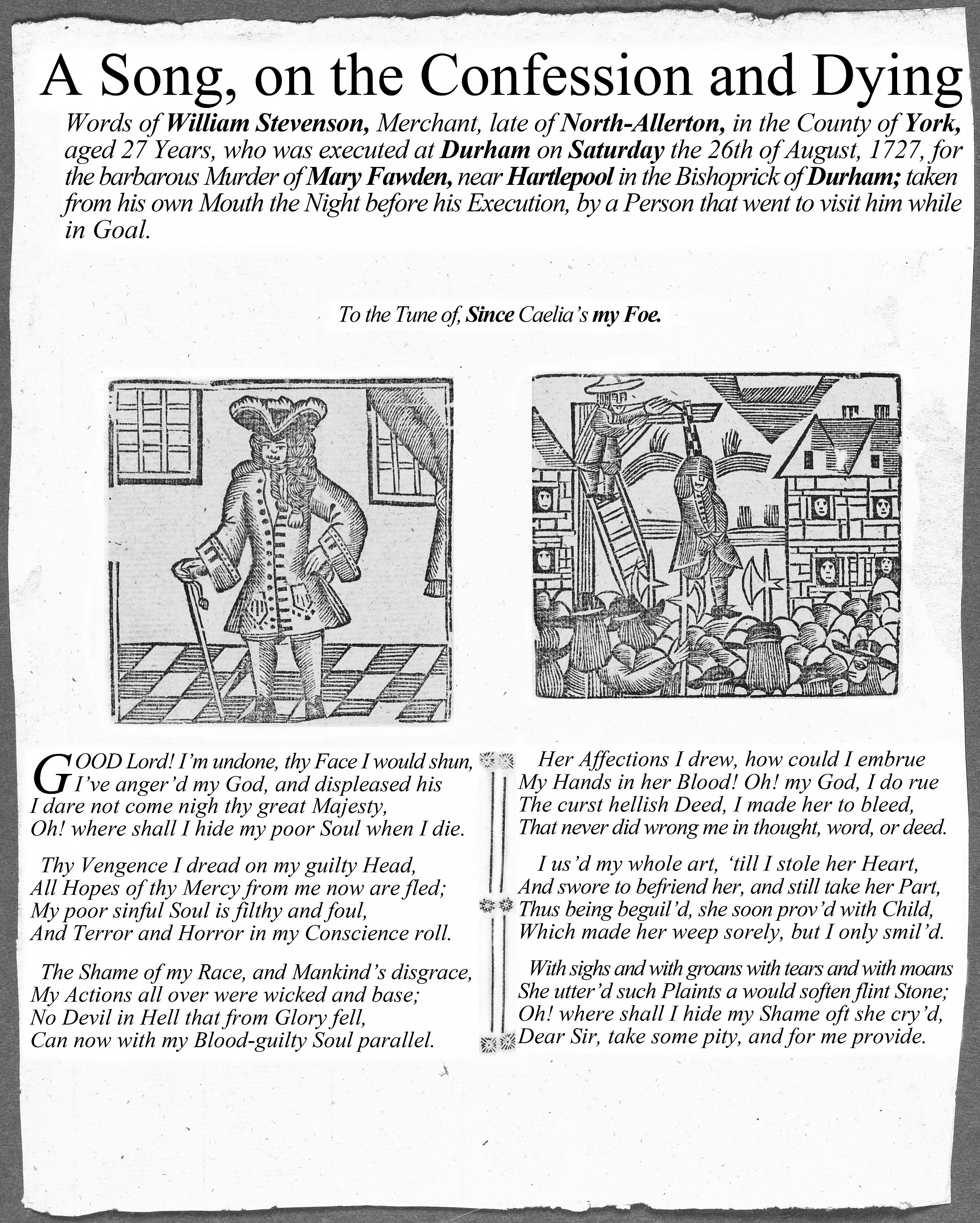
English execution ballad of a William Stevenson, c. 1727

=== Later centuries ===
==== In England ====
The ballad printing in nineteenth-century England is mostly centered around the Seven Dials, London, where the largest collections of English ballads, the Bodleian collection in the University of Oxford and the Madden collection in the University of Cambridge, were collected, among which are execution ballads.

During this era, the ballads were formatted into newsprint and could hold information such as the act of the crime, the arrest, the inquest from the coroner's, the trial, the confession of the criminal, letters from the prisoner, and the execution, alongside songs and verses. Similarly, multiple high-definition woodcut images can be added in print. They were usually anonymous, omitting the creator out of the print. The ballads often depict the execution of murderers more than in previous centuries.

==== In France ====
During the nineteenth century in France, 'Complaintes' (transl. 'Complaints') were found in almost every format, including ballads. These complaintes were attached with an 'Arrêt de la cour' (transl. 'Court judgement'), a prose summary of the crime, trial, and execution. The subject of the execution ballads was the same as England's: murders. A feature in contemporary French complaintes is the inclusion of 'Moralité' (transl. 'Moral'), structured similarly to a warning to the audience to avoid committing crime. Unlike English ballads, French ballads mention the initials and surname of the author of the song.

A feature in these ballads is the use of their melodies. Almost half of the melodies used in these ballads are 'air de Fualdès', a complainte used to commemorate the death of Antoine Bernardin Fualdès. The complainte became a widespread phenomenon that in 1827, 10 years after the melody was used, songwriter Pierre-Jean de Béranger made a song from the melody. The last execution ballads were made in France, following the death of Eugen Weidmann, the last person who was publicly executed in France.

==== In Germany ====
Coverage of crime in nineteenth century Germany were conservative than most European regions, the visual representation were less sensationalist because of the police and censorship laws at the time. Following the end of the Napoleonic wars, censorship laws in Kingdom of Prussia and the state control of the gazettes loosened that made an increase in newspaper numbers following the Unification of Germany. Even though public execution stopped happening in Prussia in 1851, this didn't stop street ballads from detailing the accounts of the crime and execution.

During this era, German execution ballads were typically formatted in a quarto eight-page chapbook. The main difference being the appearance of a prose narrative in the first few pages, followed by a ballad simply titled 'Lied' with no tune indication. These songs are structured similarly to the ones during the early modern period.

==== In Italy ====
Even various kingdoms in Italy outlawed capital punishment in during the eighteenth and nineteenth centuries as well as the implementation of the Zanardelli Code, this did not stop the execution ballads from appearing as late as 1914. Murder is still prominently the most common subjects in the country.

Italian sheets vary differently from other regions as they were printed either in prose or in song form as contemporary Italian printmakers did not combine both prose and verse on the sheet. The printmakers tend to prefer ballads to be in song form, although ballads in prose form is more commonly found in chapbooks. These were solely printed in a broadside format, which differs from their previous format of being only found in quarto chapbooks.

Italian ballads were similarly structured from other contemporary ballads from different regions, covering the stages of the criminal investigation up until the execution. These are structured predominantly in an ottava rima meter. The full names of the author were placed in the title page of the sheet, presenting themselves a 'poet'.

==== In the Netherlands ====
The abolishing of capital punishment in 1870 led to Dutch ballads focusing on executions outside of the Netherlands like execution of Jean-Baptiste Troppmann or Bruno Richard Hauptmann during the 20th century. The most recent records of local Dutch execution ballads that were not fictional at that time was when a man named George Michel was executed in Rotterdam in 1858. It is structured similarly to previous ballads of the early modern period in the Netherlands.

== See also ==
- Murder ballad
- Street literature
- Broadside ballad
- "25 Minutes to Go", a modern, satirical execution ballad
