= La serpenta canta =

Live album by Diamanda Galás
- Released: 24 November 2003
- Recorded: 26 June 1999 – 9 November 2002
- Genre: Avant-garde
- Length: 80:05
- Label: Mute
- Producer: Blaise Dupuy

Diamanda Galás chronology
| Defixiones: Will and Testament (2003) | La serpenta canta (2003) | Guilty Guilty Guilty (2008) |

Professional ratings
Review scores
| Source | Rating |
|---|---|
| AllMusic | 4.5/5 stars |
| Alternative Press | 4/5 stars |
| Pitchfork | 8.0/10 |

La serpenta canta is a live performance album by avant-garde musician Diamanda Galás, released on 24 November 2003 by Mute Records.

== Track listing ==
Disc one
| No. | Title | Writer(s) | Length |
|---|---|---|---|
| 1. | "Intro" | | 0:28 |
| 2. | "Ain't No Grave Can Hold My Body Down" | Traditional | 5:38 |
| 3. | "Burning Hell" | Besman, Hooker | 10:22 |
| 4. | "Baby's Insane" | Galás | 4:41 |
| 5. | "I'm So Lonesome I Could Cry" | Williams | 6:58 |
| 6. | "Lonely Woman" | Coleman | 6:41 |
| 7. | "Frenzy" | Hill, Stevenson | 4:06 |

Disc two
| No. | Title | Writer(s) | Length |
|---|---|---|---|
| 1. | "Blue Spirit Blues" | Spencer Williams | 5:10 |
| 2. | "My World Is Empty Without You" | Holland–Dozier–Holland | 4:21 |
| 3. | "I Put a Spell on You" | Hawkins | 6:24 |
| 4. | "The Dark End of the Street" | Moman, Penn | 4:41 |
| 5. | "Dancing in the Dark" | Dietz, Schwartz | 4:34 |
| 6. | "Dead Cat on the Line" | Greenlee, Peterson, Payne | 3:38 |
| 7. | "See That My Grave Is Kept Clean" | Traditional | 6:31 |
| 8. | "Burning Hell" (reprise) | Besman, Hooker | 5:51 |

== Personnel ==
- Diamanda Galás – vocals, piano, arrangement

Production and additional personnel

- Blaise Dupuy – production, mixing
- Rex Ray – design
- Austin Young – photography

== Release history ==
| Region | Date | Label | Format | Catalog |
|---|---|---|---|---|
| United Kingdom | 2003 | Mute | CD | STUMM 206 |
