= Schrei x =

Live album by Diamanda Galás
- Released: 23 September 1996
- Recorded: 1994
- Genre: Avant-garde
- Length: 53:15
- Label: Mute
- Producer: Blaise Dupuy

Diamanda Galás chronology
The Sporting Life (1994)	Schrei x (1996)	Malediction and Prayer (1998)

Professional ratings
Review scores
Source	Rating
AllMusic	2.5/5 stars
Q	3/5 stars

Schrei x is a live performance album by avant-garde musician Diamanda Galás, released on 23 September 1996 by Mute Records.

== Track listing ==
All music is composed by Diamanda Galás.

Schrei x Live
No.	Title	Length
1.	"Do Room"	1:12
2.	"I – I Am – Dreams"	5:02
3.	"M Dis I"	1:13
4.	"O.P.M."	1:26
5.	"Abasement"	3:11
6.	"Headbox"	2:17
7.	"Cunt"	0:50
8.	"Hepar"	0:56
9.	"Coitum"	1:15
10.	"Vein"	3:56
11.	"M Dis II"	0:57
12.	"Smell"	2:19
13.	"Hee Shock Die"	1:59

Schrei 27
No.	Title	Length
14.	"Do Room"	2:17
15.	"I I"	1:59
16.	"M Dis I"	1:36
17.	"O.P.M."	1:48
18.	"Headbox"	1:56
19.	"Cunt"	1:43
20.	"Hepar"	1:42
21.	"Vein"	1:54
22.	"M Dis II"	2:02
23.	"Smell"	2:17
24.	"Hee Shock Die"	7:27

== Personnel ==
- Diamanda Galás – vocals

Production and additional personnel

- Blaise Dupuy – recording, mixing, production
- Robert Knoke – photography
- Mandy Parnell – mastering

== Release history ==
Region	Date	Label	Format	Catalog
United Kingdom	1996	Mute	CD	STUMM 146
