= The Ballad of the Cloak =

English broadside ballad

Song
- Written: late 1600s

The Ballad of the Cloak, Or the Cloak's Knavery is an English broadside ballad that dates back, roughly, to the last quarter of the 17th century. It is most often set to the popular tune, "From Hunger and Cold, or Packington's Pound." The ballad is most recognized by its opening lines, "Come buy my new Ballet/ I hav't in my Wallet." Extant copies of the ballad can be found at the Huntington Library, the Pepys Library, the British Library and the National Library of Scotland.

== Synopsis ==
The ballad describes the journey and circumstances that the cloak has effected, similar to the point of view found in a novel of circulation, more commonly known as an it-narrative. As is the case in it-narratives, this ballad also employs a satirical voice, similar to the one found in Roman à clef. The black cloak, which belongs to a person of high political station, is responsible for imprisoning, executing, overthrowing the pope and thereby religion. It subsequently destroys the Ten Commandments and imposes a villainous, criminal king. The cloak, in its megalomania, begins to usurp its wearer's power, in which case, the wearer turns against the cloak after the cloak attempts to murder him. The ballad ends with a call for return to the "One Faith, and one Form, and one Church may contain us."

Form
The most common form employed by the ballad is ten-line stanzas, usual with two triplets and two rhyming couplets, with the rhyme scheme: A, A, A, B, B, B, C, C, D, D

== Historical basis ==
The National Library of Scotland has this to say about the ballad's history:

"This ballad is an attack on the Covenanted Church of Scotland, represented here by a black cloak. The National Covenant was drawn up and signed by members of the Presbyterian Church of Scotland in 1638. The Covenant reiterated the evils of Roman Catholicism and asserted the Church's independence from the Episcopalianism practised by King Charles I and many of the nobles who supported him. Ultimately, the Covenanters would be drawn into civil war against the Royalists, and this ballad blames the Covenanters for the eventual execution of Charles I as well as other evils done against Scotland."
