= The Litanies of Satan =

1982 studio album by Diamanda Galás

Studio album by Diamanda Galás
- Released: 25 February 1982
- Recorded: September 1981–1982
- Studio: Nadir Studios, London, England and San Diego, CA
- Genre: Avant-garde
- Length: 29:51
- Label: Y
- Producer: Dave Hunt

Diamanda Galás chronology
If Looks Could Kill (1979)	The Litanies of Satan (1982)	Diamanda Galás (1984)

The Litanies of Satan is the debut album by American avant-garde artist Diamanda Galás, released in the United Kingdom by Y Records in 1982; it was released in her home country in 1989.

== Content ==
The text for "The Litanies of Satan" is taken from a section of Les Fleurs du Mal by Charles Baudelaire. According to the album liner notes, the piece "devotes itself to the emeraldine perversity of the life struggle in Hell." The notes go on to state that "Wild Women with Steak-Knives," from the tragedy-grotesque by Diamanda Galás Eyes Without Blood, is "a cold examination of unrepentant monomania, the devoration instinct, for which the naive notion of filial mercy will only cock a vestigial grin."

== Reception ==
Professional ratings
Review scores
Source	Rating
AllMusic	4/5 stars
Trouser Press	favorable

Trouser Press described it as "a disturbing and provocative piece."

== Track listing ==
In some issues, the vinyl sides are oppositely labeled, while all compact disc reissues also present the tracks in the incorrect order.

Side one
No.	Title	Lyrics	Music	Length
1.	"The Litanies of Satan"	Charles Baudelaire	Diamanda Galás	17:48

Side two
No.	Title	Lyrics	Music	Length
1.	"Wild Women with Steak-Knives (The Homicidal Love Song for Solo Scream)"	Diamanda Galás	Diamanda Galás	12:04

== Personnel ==
- Diamanda Galás — vocals; tape and electronics on side one

Production personnel

- Dick O’Dell — executive production
- Dave Hunt — production, engineering on side one
- Durand Rene Legault — recording, engineering assistant on side two
- Richard Zvonar — engineering on side two
- Will Gullette — photography
- Martyn Lambert — design

== Release history ==
Region	Date	Label	Format	Catalog
United Kingdom	1982	Y	LP	Y 18
United States	1989	Mute	CD, LP	ISO 1
United States	1989	Restless	CD, LP	71419
Worldwide	2020	Intravenal Sound Operations	CD, LP, digital download, streaming	ISO001
