= Dancing in the Dark (Howard Dietz and Arthur Schwartz song) =

1931 song

Song
- Published: 1931 by Harms
- Composer: Arthur Schwartz
- Lyricist: Howard Dietz

"Dancing in the Dark" is a popular American song, with music by Arthur Schwartz and lyrics by Howard Dietz, that was introduced by John Barker with Tilly Losch dancing in the 1931 revue The Band Wagon. The song was first recorded by Bing Crosby on August 19, 1931, with Studio orchestra directed by Victor Young, staying on the pop charts for six weeks, peaking at #3, and helping to make it a lasting standard.

The 1941 recording by Artie Shaw and His Orchestra earned Shaw one of his eight gold records at the height of the Big Band era of the 1930s and 1940s. Shaw's 1940 arrangement was a collaboration between Shaw and his chief arranger, Lennie Hayton, who was also an important Music Director, arranger and orchestrator at MGM until 1953.

It was subsequently featured in the classic 1953 MGM musical The Band Wagon and has since come to be considered part of the Great American Songbook. In the film it is orchestrally performed to a ballet dance by Fred Astaire and Cyd Charisse set in Central Park. The song is given a 'sensual and dramatic' orchestration by Conrad Salinger, choreographed by Michael Kidd.

== Other recordings ==
- Al Bowlly as part of a medley on a 78 rpm record Al Bowlly Remembers Medley Part 1 (November 11, 1938) (See Al Bowlly discography)
- Charlie Parker - included in the album Charlie Parker with Strings (recorded July 1950, released in 1954)
- Fred Astaire - recorded for his album The Astaire Story (1952)
- Jo Stafford - included in her 1955 album Broadway's Best
- Ray Conniff - included in his album 'S Wonderful! (1956)
- Gordon MacRae - for his 1957 album Motion Picture Soundstage
- Sarah Vaughan - for her album At Mister Kelly's (1957)., and Sarah Vaughan Sings Broadway: Great Songs from Hit Shows (1958),
- Dorothy Ashby covered the song in 1958 on Hip Harp
- Julian "Cannonball" Adderley - in the 1958 album Somethin' Else
- Duke Ellington and His Orchestra - on the album Ellington Indigos
- Patti Page- included in her 1958 album I've Heard That Song Before
- Jane Morgan - in the album Great Songs from the Great Shows of the Century (1959)
- Frank Sinatra - included on his 1959 album Come Dance with Me
- Bert Kaempfert - for his 1960 album Dancing in Wonderland
- Tony Bennett recorded it twice, first in 1961 for the album My Heart Sings, and then in 1993 for the Steppin' Out album
- Mel Tormé - for his 1961 album My Kind of Music
- Connie Stevens on her 1962 album From Me To You
- Bill Evans - for the 1964 album Trio 64
- Johnny Mathis - for his album Love Is Everything (1965)
- Ella Fitzgerald sang it live at a concert in 1970 and this has been issued on the album Ella in Budapest
- Diana Krall on her The Look of Love (2001)
- Diamanda Galás on her 2003 live album La serpenta canta.

== In popular culture ==
- Steve Martin was the host for the final episode of season 14 of Saturday Night Live. In the opening monologue, he visibly struggled to hold back tears as he paid tribute to Gilda Radner, who had died of cancer on the afternoon before the broadcast. Martin and Radner's "Dancing in the Dark" sketch, originally shown in episode 64 in 1978, was also offered in tribute.
- The Muppets on Buddy Rich's episode of The Muppet Show (1981)
- Diagnosis Murder Season 2 episode 13 “The Bela Lugosi Blues” character Mariah Thomas hums it as a seductive lure before killing her victims.
- Dancing in the Dark is mentioned in Gravity's Rainbow by Thomas Pynchon.
