= You Must Be Certain of the Devil =

Studio album by Diamanda Galás
- Released: May 23, 1988
- Recorded: 1987
- Studio: Hansa, Berlin, Germany
- Genre: Avant-garde • blues
- Length: 31:47
- Label: Mute
- Producer: Gareth Jones; Diamanda Galás

Diamanda Galás chronology
Saint of the Pit (1986)	You Must Be Certain of the Devil (1988)	Masque of the Red Death (1988)

Professional ratings
Review scores
Source	Rating
AllMusic	4/5 stars

You Must Be Certain of the Devil is the fifth album by American avant-garde performer Diamanda Galás, released on May 23, 1988 by record label Mute.

== Content ==
You Must Be Certain of the Devil is the final instalment in her "Masque of the Red Death" trilogy about the AIDS epidemic. The selections from this installment are rooted in American gospel music.

== Track listing ==
Side A
No.	Title	Writer(s)	Length
1.	"Swing Low, Sweet Chariot"	Wallace Willis	2:44
2.	"Double-Barrel Prayer"	Diamanda Galás	5:01
3.	"Let's Not Chat About Despair"	Diamanda Galás	5:00
4.	"Birds of Death"	Diamanda Galás	5:15

Side B
No.	Title	Writer(s)	Length
1.	"You Must Be Certain of the Devil"	Diamanda Galás	4:55
2.	"Let My People Go"	Diamanda Galás, traditional	3:22
3.	"Malediction"	Diamanda Galás	4:17
4.	"The Lord Is My Shepherd"	Diamanda Galás	1:13

== Personnel ==
- Diamanda Galás – all vocals, Hammond organ, piano, synthesizers, keyboard bass, & production
- Charlie Terstappen – drums
- Peter Zimmermann – percussion (A4)
- Kurt Schmidt – guitar (A2 & A4)
- Naut Humon – String samples (A3)
- Gareth Jones – production
- John Dent – mastering
- Pete Schmidt – Assistant engineering

== Charts ==
Chart (1988)	Peak position
UK Indie Chart	12
