= The Sporting Life (album) =

Studio album by Diamanda Galás and John Paul Jones
- Released: September 6, 1994
- Recorded: 1994
- Length: 55:01
- Label: Mute
- Producer: John Paul Jones

Diamanda Galás chronology
Vena Cava (1993)	The Sporting Life (1994)	Schrei x (1996)

John Paul Jones chronology
Scream for Help (1985)	The Sporting Life (1994)	Zooma (1999)

The Sporting Life is an album by singer Diamanda Galás and multi-instrumentalist John Paul Jones, released on September 6, 1994, by record label Mute.

== Reception ==
Professional ratings
Review scores
Source	Rating
AllMusic	3/5 stars
Trouser Press	favorable

Trouser Press described the album as "her most stimulating and broadly appealing work yet."

== Track listing ==
1. "Skótoseme" (Galás, Jones) – 6:27
2. "Do You Take This Man?" (Galás, Jones) – 6:09
3. "Dark End of the Street" (Chips Moman, Dan Penn) – 2:42
4. "You're Mine" (Galás) – 5:10
5. "Tony" (Galás) – 5:37
6. "Devil's Rodeo" (Galás, Jones, Pete Thomas) – 5:37
7. "The Sporting Life" (Galás, Jones) – 5:45
8. "Baby's Insane" (Galás) – 4:39
9. "Last Man Down" (Galás, Jones) – 4:50
10. "Hex" (Galás, Jones) – 8:04

== Personnel ==
- Diamanda Galás – vocals, Hammond organ, piano
- John Paul Jones – bass guitar, lap steel guitar
- Pete Thomas – drums, percussion

Technical

- Richard Evans – engineering
- Patricia Mooney – art direction, design
- Catherine McGann – photography

"Diamanda Galás would like to dedicate her work on this album to Linda Greenberg, "Last Man Down" to Carl Valentino, and "Hex" to Michael Flanagan."
