= Malediction and Prayer =

Live album by Diamanda Galás
- Released: 8 May 1998
- Recorded: November 1996–June 1997
- Genre: Avant-garde
- Length: 59:11
- Label: Mute/Asphodel
- Producer: Diamanda Galás

Diamanda Galás chronology
| Schrei x (1996) | Malediction and Prayer (1998) | Defixiones: Will and Testament (2003) |

Professional ratings
Review scores
| Source | Rating |
|---|---|
| AllMusic | 4/5 stars |
| Pitchfork | 5.0/10 |

Malediction and Prayer is a live performance album by avant-garde musician Diamanda Galás, released on 8 May 1998 by Asphodel and Mute Records. It features recordings from her concert tour "Malediction and Prayer: Concert for the Damned" between 1996 and 1997.

== Track listing ==
| No. | Title | Writer(s) | Length |
|---|---|---|---|
| 1. | "Iron Lady" | Phil Ochs | 4:43 |
| 2. | "The Thrill is Gone" | Rick Darnell, Roy Hawkins | 5:36 |
| 3. | "My World Is Empty Without You" | Holland–Dozier–Holland | 4:27 |
| 4. | "Abel et Caïn" | Charles Baudelaire adapted by D. Galás | 5:33 |
| 5. | "Death Letter" | Son House | 4:41 |
| 6. | "Supplica a mia madre" | Pier Paolo Pasolini adapted by D. Galás | 4:13 |
| 7. | "Insane Asylum" | Willie Dixon | 7:12 |
| 8. | "Si la muerte" | Miguel Huezo Mixco adapted by D. Galás | 5:22 |
| 9. | "25 Minutes to Go" | Shel Silverstein | 4:35 |
| 10. | "Keigome Keigome" | Nikos Gatsos, Stavros Xarchakos | 4:32 |
| 11. | "I'm Gonna Live the Life" | Thomas A. Dorsey | 4:27 |
| 12. | "Gloomy Sunday" | Carter, Jávor, Seress | 3:52 |

== Personnel ==
- Diamanda Galás — vocals, piano, production

Production and additional personnel

- Blaise Dupuy — engineering
- Xopher Davidsonv— mixing, mastering
- Alex Oropeza — mixing
- Michael Halsband — photography
- Rex Ray — design

== Release history ==
| Region | Date | Label | Format | Catalog |
|---|---|---|---|---|
| United Kingdom | 1998 | Mute | CD, CS | STUMM 163 |
| United States | 1998 | Asphodel | CD, LP | 0984 |
