= Vena Cava (album) =

Live album by Diamanda Galás
- Released: 6 September 1993
- Recorded: February–March 1993
- Studio: The Kitchen, New York City
- Genre: Avant-garde
- Length: 61:36
- Label: Mute
- Producer: Eric Liljestrand

Diamanda Galás chronology
The Singer (1992)	Vena Cava (1993)	The Sporting Life (1994)

Professional ratings
Review scores
Source	Rating
AllMusic	4/5 stars
Entertainment Weekly	B
Spin Alternative Record Guide	8/10

Vena Cava is a live performance album by avant-garde artist Diamanda Galás. It was released in 1993 on Mute Records.

== Track listing ==
All music is composed by Diamanda Galás.

No.	Title	Length
1.	"Vena Cava 1"	12:54
2.	"Vena Cava 2"	4:54
3.	"Vena Cava 3"	6:22
4.	"Vena Cava 4"	10:26
5.	"Vena Cava 5"	7:36
6.	"Vena Cava 6"	1:46
7.	"Vena Cava 7"	14:24
8.	"Vena Cava 8"	3:13

== Personnel ==
- Diamanda Galás – vocals
- Philip-Dimitri Galás – accordion, vocals

Production and additional personnel

- Blaise Dupuy – engineering
- Eric Liljestrand – production
- Robbie Lorenço – photography
- Fred Sodima – art direction

== Release history ==
Region	Date	Label	Format	Catalog
United Kingdom	1993	Mute	CD, CS, LP	STUMM 119
