= Guilty Guilty Guilty =

Live album by Diamanda Galás
- Released: 1 April 2008
- Recorded: 25 October 2005–20 March 2006
- Studio: Knitting Factory and The Tonic, New York City; Auckland Town Hall, New Zealand
- Genre: Blues
- Length: 41:59
- Label: Mute
- Producer: Diamanda Galás

Diamanda Galás chronology
La serpenta canta (2003)	Guilty Guilty Guilty (2008)	All the Way (2017)

Professional ratings
Review scores
Source	Rating
Mojo	3/5 stars

Guilty Guilty Guilty is a live performance album by avant-garde musician Diamanda Galás, released on 1 April 2008 by Mute Records.

== Track listing ==
No.	Title	Writer(s)	Length
1.	"8 Men and 4 Women"	Robey	7:38
2.	"Long Black Veil"	Dill, Wilkin	5:39
3.	"Down So Low"	Nelson	4:12
4.	"Interlude (Time)"	Delerue, Shaper	4:25
5.	"Autumn Leaves"	Kosma, Mercer, Prévert	6:39
6.	"O Death"	Galás, Traditional arr.	9:01
7.	"Heaven Have Mercy"	Larue, Philippe-Gérard	4:26

== Personnel ==
- Diamanda Galás – vocals, arrangement, production, art direction

Production and additional personnel

- Blaise Dupuy – recording, mixing
- Joe LaPorta – mastering
- Emily Lazar – mastering
- P.A. Taylor – design
- Austin Young – photography

== Release history ==
Region	Date	Label	Format	Catalog
United Kingdom	2008	Mute	CD	STUMM 274
