= All the Way (Diamanda Galás album) =

Studio album by Diamanda Galás
- Released: March 24, 2017
- Recorded: Paris; Copenhagen; East Sussex (all live); San Diego (studio)
- Length: 41:05
- Label: Intravenal Sound Operations

Diamanda Galás chronology
Guilty Guilty Guilty (2008)	All the Way (2017)	At Saint Thomas the Apostle Harlem (2017)

All the Way is a studio/live cover album by Diamanda Galás, released in 2017. All the Way was one of two albums of hers released on March 24, 2017, the other being a live album named At Saint Thomas the Apostle Harlem. These albums consisted of Galás' first released material since 2008.

The album features six interpretations of blues, folk, and jazz standards. In advance of the album's release, the title track was available to stream via SoundCloud in January 2017.

== Reception ==
Professional ratings
Aggregate scores
Source	Rating
Metacritic	79/100
Review scores
Source	Rating
Pitchfork	7.7
Tiny Mix Tapes	4/5 stars
The Vinyl District	A

Lottie Brazier of The Quietus stated in a non-rated positive review that the album "is particularly strong, however, for both the production of Galás' piano and its melodies – there is an added, foreboding subtlety which comes through with more clarity here."

== Track listing ==
No.	Title	Writer(s)	Length
1.	"All the Way"	James Van Heusen	7:16
2.	"You Don't Know What Love Is"	Gene DePaul, Don Raye	6:23
3.	"The Thrill Is Gone"	Lew Brown, Ray Henderson	7:19
4.	"'Round Midnight"	Thelonious Monk	4:16
5.	"O Death"	Traditional	10:55
6.	"Pardon Me I've Got Someone to Kill"	Johnny Paycheck	4:56
Total length:			41:04
