= Packington's Pound =

Song

"Packington's Pound" is an English broadside ballad that dates back, roughly, to the last quarter of the 16th century. It is most recognized by its tune, and, in fact, more tunes were set to "Packington's Pound" than ballads named "Packington's Pound." Claude Simpson in "The British Broadside Ballad and its Music" writes: "This [Packington's Pound] is the most popular single tune associated with ballads before 1700." Extant copies of the ballad can be found at the Huntington Library, the Pepys Library, and the National Library of Scotland.

== Synopsis ==
Due to the tune's overwhelming popularity, it is difficult to pinpoint a specific plot about which the ballad centers. Instead, because of this ubiquity, the tune was readily applied to countless other ballads with myriad themes.

The ballad form of "Packington's Pound," on the other hand, is most often assembled in eight stanzas of nine lines, though it is not a Spenserian stanza or a Balassi Stanza with an A, A, B, B, C, C, C, D, D, rhyme scheme.

== Historical Basis ==
The tune "Packington's Pound" is often attributed to lutenist, Francis Cutting—though, his name is not found on any of the extant ballads. The name may have originated from John Packington—one of Elizabeth I's court favorites, though there are other Packingtons to whom the ballad could be attributed, still within the realm of Elizabeth's court. The history of the tune suggests that prior to 1700, "Packington's Pound" was a more popular tune than "Fortune My Foe" and "Greensleeves."

A set of variations for keyboard ("Pakingtons Pownde") by an anonymous hand appears in the Fitzwilliam Virginal Book (MU.MS.168), Benjamin Cosyn's Virginal Book and the Paris Conservatoire MS Res. 1186.

The popular ballad, "The Cloak" or "The Ballad of the Cloak: Or, the Cloak's Knavery" is often sung to the tune of "Packington's Pound."

"Packington's Pound," the tune, has been incorporated into many historical plays by many well-established playwrights--John Gay's "The Beggar's Opera", Ben Jonson's "Bartholomew Fair," and Edward Phillips's "The Mock Lawyer," to name a few.

== Contemporary renditions ==
The tune has, in recent years, been co-opted by several guitarists, which have produced renditions available on YouTube and various sheet music sets.

A ballad sung to the tune of "Packington's Pound"—though it is not the ballad "Packington's Pound" is recorded in UC, Santa Barbara's English Broadside Ballad Archive.
