= Nicholas Chare =

- Occupation: Lecturer in gender studies at the University of Melbourne
- Known for: Auschwitz and Afterimages: Abjection, Witnessing and Representation (2011); After Francis Bacon: Synaesthesia and Sex in Paint (2012)
- Awards: 2007 Leverhulme Trust Award
- Scientific career
- Fields: Gender studies
- Institutions: University of Melbourne
- Website: Profile

Nicholas Chare is a professor of art history at the Université de Montréal. He received his Bachelor of Arts in English and the history of art from the University of Leeds in 1997, and his Master of Arts in the social history of art from the same institution in 1998. He received his PhD from the University of Leeds in 2005. He has served as an instructor at the University of Melbourne, the University of Leeds, the University of Reading, the University of York, and Goldsmiths, University of London.

He is the author of Auschwitz and Afterimages: Abjection, Witnessing and Representation, After Francis Bacon: Synaesthesia and Sex in Paint and co-editor of Representing Auschwitz: At the Margins of Testimony (2013) and Matters of Testimony : Interpreting the Scrolls of Auschwitz (2017).

Chare was a 2007 recipient of the Leverhulme Trust Award recognising his research into paintings by Francis Bacon.

== Works ==
=== Books ===
- Chare, Nicholas (2011). Auschwitz and Afterimages: Abjection, Witnessing and Representation. London: I.B. Tauris. OCLC 663446345.
- Chare, Nicholas (2012). After Francis Bacon: Synaesthesia and Sex in Paint. London: Ashgate. OCLC 824731080.
- Chare, Nicholas; Williams, Dominic. (2013). Representing Auschwitz: At the Margins of Testimony. Houdmills: Palgrave. OCLC 842208477.
- Chare, Nicolas, Williams, Dominic. (2016). Matters of Testimony : Interpreting the Scrolls of Auschwitz. Oxford: Berghahn. OCLC 936526248.
- Chare, Nicolas; Franck, Mitchell B. (edited by). (2021) History and Art History: Looking Past Disciplines. New York: Routledge. OCLC 1237709112.
