= The Divine Punishment =

Studio album by Diamanda Galás
- Released: June 30, 1986
- Recorded: Dave Hunt Studios, London, England; Informusik Studios, San Francisco & OTR Studios, Belmont, California, United States
- Genre: Avant-garde
- Length: 32:47
- Label: Mute
- Producer: Dave Hunt

Diamanda Galás chronology
Diamanda Galas (1984)	The Divine Punishment (1986)	Saint of the Pit (1986)

The Divine Punishment is the third album by American avant-garde artist Diamanda Galás, released on June 30, 1986 by record label Mute.

== Content ==
The Divine Punishment is the first installment of her "Masque of the Red Death" trilogy about the AIDS epidemic. In this installment, she focuses on interpretations of Old Testament scripture.

== Reception ==
Professional ratings
Review scores
Source	Rating
AllMusic	4.5/5 stars

AllMusic has retrospectively praised the album, describing it as "compelling but brutal. An ugly, brooding masterpiece."

== Track listing ==
All music is composed by Diamanda Galás.

Side A
No.	Title	Length
1.	"Deliver Me From Mine Enemies" (I. This Is the Law of the Plague/II. Deliver Me From Mine Enemies/ III. We Shall not Accept Your Quarantine/IV. Εξελόυμε/V. Γιατί, Ό Θεός?/VI. Psalm 22)	19:15

Side B
No.	Title	Length
1.	"Free Among the Dead" (I. Psalm 88/II. Lamentations/III. Sono L'Antichristo)	13:32

== Personnel ==
- Diamanda Galás – vocals, co-producer

Production and additional personnel

- T.J. Eng – photography
- Frank Harris – engineering (B1)
- Naut Humon – engineering (B1)
- Dave Hunt – production, engineering (A1), mixing (B1)
- Richard Zvonar – engineering (B1)

== Release history ==
Region	Date	Label	Format	Catalog
United Kingdom	1986	Mute	LP	stumm 27
United States	1986	Mute	LP	71417
