= Saint of the Pit =

Studio album by Diamanda Galás
- Released: 17 November 1986
- Recorded: Dave Hunt Studios, London, England; Informusik Studios, San Francisco and OTR Studios, Belmont, California, United States
- Genre: Avant-garde
- Length: 36:25
- Label: Mute
- Producer: Diamanda Galás; Gareth Jones

Diamanda Galás chronology
The Divine Punishment (1986)	Saint of the Pit (1986)	You Must Be Certain of the Devil (1988)

Saint of the Pit is the fourth album by American avant-garde artist Diamanda Galás, released on 17 November 1986 by record label Mute.

== Content ==
Saint of the Pit is the second instalment of her "Masque of the Red Death" trilogy about the AIDS epidemic. In this instalment, she focuses on musical settings of poems by French Decadents.

== Reception ==
Professional ratings
Review scores
Source	Rating
AllMusic	3/5 stars
Trouser Press	favorable

Trouser Press wrote "Galás' astonishingly varied singing styles and the hypnotic effect of the record's three claustrophobic, obsessive pieces makes Saint of the Pit a powerful document of suffering."

== Track listing ==
All music is composed by Diamanda Galás.

Side A
No.	Title	Lyrics	Length
1.	"La treizième revient" (The Thirteenth Returns)		5:03
2.	"Εξελόυ με" (Deliver Me)	Diamanda Galás	7:18
3.	"L'Héautontimorouménos" (The Self-Tormentor)	Charles Baudelaire	6:48

Side B
No.	Title	Lyrics	Length
1.	"Artémis"	Gérard de Nerval	5:01
2.	"Cris d'aveugle" (Blind Man's Cry)	Tristan Corbière	12:15

== Personnel ==
Musicians

- Diamanda Galás – vocals, piano, Hammond organ, synthesizer, producer
- F. M. Einheit – chains on Εξελόυ με, drums on Cris d'aveugle

Production and additional personnel

- Gareth Jones – production
- Paul Kendall – recording (A1)

== Charts ==
Chart (1986)	Peak position
UK Indie Chart	26

== Release history ==
Region	Date	Label	Format	Catalog
United Kingdom	1986	Mute	LP	STUMM 33
United States	1986	Mute Ltd.	LP	71418
