= Squamish Valley Music Festival =

Former festival in Canada

- Status: Defunct
- Genre: Music festival
- Dates: August
- Frequency: Annual
- Venue: Logger Sports Grounds and Brennan Park field complex
- Locations: Squamish, British Columbia, Canada
- Years active: Six
- Inaugurated: 2010
- Most recent: 2015
- Attendance: 120,000 (2015)

The Squamish Valley Music Festival (pronounced /ˈskwɔːmɪʃ/), previously LIVE at Squamish, was an annual music festival co-produced by Vancouver-based BRANDLIVE Management and Live Nation Canada, held in Squamish, British Columbia, over the second weekend in August. In 2015, its last year, it had an attendance of over 120,000 people. The festival was cancelled in 2016.

== History ==
The festival, originally called LIVE at Squamish, began in 2010 and had an attendance of about 13,000 people.

Squamish attracted headlining artists such as Bad Religion, Metric, the Tragically Hip, Childish Gambino, Weezer, Matthew Good, City and Colour, Vampire Weekend, Queens of the Stone Age, Eminem, Macklemore & Ryan Lewis, Gogol Bordello, and Jurassic 5.

In its last year, it attracted over 120,000 people. In 2016, the festival's organizers, BRANDLIVE and Live Nation Canada, cancelled the event, due to a falling Canadian dollar and increasing competition from other music festivals.
