= Go Down Moses =

African-American spiritual song

"Go Down, Moses"
- Fisk Jubilee Singers (earliest attested)

Song
- Genre: Spiritual
- Songwriter: Traditional

Go Down Moses

"Go Down Moses" is an African-American spiritual which describes the biblical narrative of the Book of Exodus 5:1, in which God commands Moses to demand the release of the Israelites from bondage in Biblical Egypt. "And the LORD spoke unto Moses, Go unto Pharaoh, and say unto him, Thus saith the LORD, Let my people go, that they may serve me".

As is common in spirituals, the song refers to freedom, both the freedom of the Israelites, and that of runaway enslaved people. As a result of those messages, it was outlawed by many enslavers.

The opening verse, as published by the Jubilee Singers in 1872:

When Israel was in Egypt's land
Let my people go
Oppress'd so hard they could not stand
Let my people go

Refrain:
Go down, Moses
Way down in Egypt's land
Tell old Pharaoh
Let my people go

Superficially, the song refers to Biblical narrative of the Exodus. That story held a subversive meaning for enslaved African Americans, relating their experiences under slavery to those of Biblical Israelites under Egyptian slavery, and resonating with the idea that God would come to the aid of the persecuted. "Go Down Moses" also makes reference to the Jordan River, commonly associated in spirituals with reaching freedom, as the act of running away often involved crossing one or more rivers.

Since the Old Testament recognizes the Nile Valley as further south, and thus, lower than Jerusalem and the Promised Land, heading to Egypt means going "down" while going away from Egypt is "up". In the context of American slavery, that ancient sense of "down" converged with the concept of going "down the river" (the Mississippi), to the Deep South, where enslaved people's conditions were notoriously worse. Later verses also draw parallels between the Israelites' freedom from slavery and humanity's freedom won by Christ.

== "Oh! Let My People Go" ==
"Oh! Let My People Go"
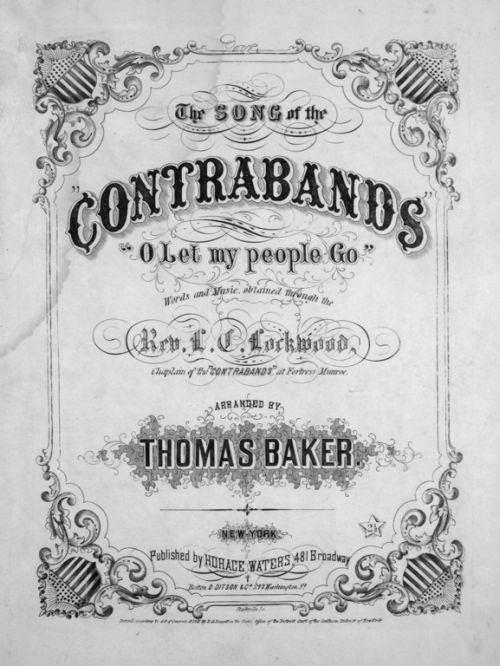
- Sheet music cover, 1862

Song
- Published: 1862
- Genre: spiritual
- Songwriter: Traditional

Although usually thought of as a spiritual, the earliest written record of the song was as a rallying anthem for the Contrabands at Fort Monroe sometime before July 1862. White people who reported on the song presumed it was composed by them. It became the first spiritual known to be recorded in sheet music.

While the Reverend Lewis Lockwood, the chaplain of the Contrabands, was visiting Fortress Monroe in 1861, he heard runaway enslaved people singing the song, transcribed what he heard, and eventually published it in the National Anti-Slavery Standard. Soon after, sheet music was published titled "Oh! Let My People Go: The Song of the Contrabands", arranged by Horace Waters. Lockwood stated in the sheet music that the song was from Virginia, dating from about 1853.

However, the song was not included in Slave Songs of the United States, despite its being a very prominent spiritual among enslaved people. Furthermore, the original version of the song sung by enslaved people almost definitely sounded very different from what Lockwood transcribed by ear, especially following an arrangement by a person who had never heard the song as it was originally sung. The opening verse, as recorded by Lockwood, is:

The Lord, by Moses, to Pharaoh said: Oh! let my people go
If not, I'll smite your first-born dead—Oh! let my people go
Oh! go down, Moses
Away down to Egypt's land
And tell King Pharaoh
To let my people go

Sarah Bradford's authorized biography of Harriet Tubman, Scenes in the Life of Harriet Tubman (1869), quotes Tubman as saying she used "Go Down Moses" as one of two code songs used with fugitive enslaved people to communicate when fleeing Maryland. Tubman began her underground railroad work in 1850 and continued until the beginning of the Civil War, so it is possible Tubman's use of the song predates the origin claimed by Lockwood. Some people even hypothesize that she herself may have written the spiritual. Others claim that Nat Turner, who led one of the most well-known slave revolts in history, either wrote or was the inspiration for the song.

== Recordings ==
- The Tuskegee Institute Singers recorded the song for Victor in 1914.
- The Kelly Family recorded the song twice: live version is included on their album Live (1988) and a studio version on New World (1990). The latter also features on their compilation album The Very Best - Over 10 Years (1993).
- The Golden Gate Quartet (Duration: 3:05; recorded in 1957 for their album Spirituals).
- Louis Armstrong recorded it for the 1958 album Louis and the Good Book.
- "Go Down Moses" was recorded by the Robert Shaw Chorale on RCA Victor 33 record LM/LSC 2580, copyright 1964, first side, second band, lasting 4 minutes and 22 seconds. Liner notes by noted African-American author Langston Hughes.
- Paul Robeson recorded the song in the 1940s.

== See also ==
- Christian child's prayer § Spirituals
- Let My People Go (disambiguation)

== Bibliography ==
- The Continental Monthly. Vol. II (July–December 1862). New York.
- Lockwood, L.C. "Oh! Let My People Go: The Song of the Contrabands". New York: Horace Waters (1862).
