= List of Off the Air episodes =

Off the Air is an American psychedelic anthology television series that aired on Adult Swim. Every episode is composed of surreal videos of different media and purposes – animated and live-action short films, clips from feature films and other television series, stock videos, music videos, abstract loops – presented continuously and in succession. These videos are arranged around a single vague theme, as expressed in the episode's title, and are accompanied by songs by various artists. Dave Hughes, the creator of the series, also serves as its editor. He and the rest of the series' producers also commission artists to produce works to be featured in an episode.

Fifty-four episodes have aired over fifteen seasons since Off the Air premiered on January 1, 2011. Every episode had a time slot of 4 a.m., which has contributed to the series' obscurity and status among fans of Adult Swim. Three special episodes have been produced: "Dan Deacon: U.S.A.", "Seramthgin", and "Dan Deacon: When I Was Done Dying". The twentieth episode "NEWNOW" is a celebration of New Year's Day and the series' fifth anniversary featuring six original songs.

== Episodes ==
The closing credits of every episode list the featured videos and songs as well as their respective artists; generic stock footage is often employed, and suppliers (including Getty Images and iStock) are additionally credited. In the following lists, material commissioned for an episode are marked with a dagger (†). Segments are shown in an episode with more than one excerpt and so are marked with a plus (+) and the number of the segment that has been previously shown earlier in an episode.

Season	Episodes	Originally released	
Season	Episodes	First released	Last released
1	5	January 1, 2011	June 1, 2012
2	4	August 28, 2012	October 1, 2013
3	3	December 31, 2013	April 22, 2014
4	4	September 2, 2014	August 29, 2011
5	4	July 21, 2015	December 29, 2015
6	4	May 24, 2016	January 31, 2017
7	3	November 21, 2017	December 5, 2017
8	4	May 29, 2018	January 1, 2019
9	4	September 3, 2019	December 31, 2019
10	3	June 9, 2020	December 29, 2020
11	4	October 12, 2021	December 27, 2021
12	4	July 4, 2022	December 26, 2022
13	4	December 19, 2023	December 19, 2023
14	2	December 27, 2024	December 27, 2024
15	2	December 30, 2025	December 30, 2025

=== Season 1 (2011–12) ===
No. overall	No. in season	Title	Original release date	Prod. code	US viewers (millions)
1	1	"Animals"	January 1, 2011	101	N/A
Too moist to burn. Featured videos: 1. The Big Bounce footage supplied by the Prelinger Archives; 2. Explosion stock footage provided by iStock (uncredited); 3. El hombre y la Tierra footage provided by RTVE; 4. "Zodiac Shit" (credited as "Zodiac Animals") music video† by Adam Fuchs (credited as LilFuchs); 5. Snow monkey footage provided by Getty Images; 6. Cows and Zebras† by Taras Hrabowsky; 7. Meow Mix (credited as an "original animation") by Cyriak Harris; 8. Triple Jump advertisement for the East Japan Railway Company by Tugboat; 9. Frilled lizard stock footage provided by Corbis Motion; 10. "The Music Scene" music video by Anthony F. Shepperd; 11. American flag stock footage provided by iStock (uncredited); 12. Cheese rolling video by SoGlos (+3); 13. 3D closing credits† by Adam Bruneau; Featured songs: 1. "Xerxes (Largo)" by George Handel (uncredited); 2. "Baltihorse" by Dan Deacon; 3. "Zodiac Shit" by Flying Lotus (uncredited); 4. "Ghetto Fly" by Crispin Taylor, Ernie McKone, and Toby Baker (uncredited); 5. "Let the Blind Lead Those Who Can See but Cannot Feel" by Atlas Sound; 6. Meow Mix score by Cyriak Harris (uncredited); 7. Triple Jump score by East Japan Railway Company; 8. "The Music Scene" by Blockhead; 9. "Star Spangled Banner"† by Black Lips
2	2	"Food"	May 25, 2011	102	N/A
Delicious When Consumed. Featured videos: 1. The Big Bounce footage supplied by the Prelinger Archives; 2. Think Globally, Act Locally by William Lamson; 3. Title sequence† by Dax Norman; 4. Digestive system animation† by Flix Productions Medical Animation; 5. The Huber Experiments – Vol. 1 by Erik and Matthew Huber; 6. Unabomber Speckles drawing provided by R. Land; 7. Stock images provided by iStock; 8. Western Spaghetti by PES; 9. "We Want Your Soul" music video by Happy; 10. Meat, girl eating chicken and chicken eye stock footage provided by iStock; 11. Something by Cyriak Harris; 12. Ecological Apple by Andreas Soderberg (+2); 13. Oyster Vision by Coral Morphologic; 14. Heinz Automato (credited as Automato) by Bill Feinup and Barry Kudrowitz; Featured songs: 1. "Quick Canal" by Atlas Sound feat. Lætitia Sadier; 2. The Huber Experiments – Vol. 1 score by Brian Slusher (uncredited); 3. "Bruschotti" by Longmont Potion Castle; 4. "The Flying Nun" by 9 Lazy 9; 5. "We Want Your Soul" by Adam Freeland; 6. Let's All Go to the Lobby audio by Filmack Studios; 7. Something score by Cyriak Harris (uncredited); 8. Oyster Vision score by Coral Morphologic; 9. "Kiss Me Goodbye" by D. Todd Sorensen (uncredited)
3	3	"Dance"	September 3, 2011	103	N/A
The language of the body in motion speaks all languages. Featured videos: 1. The Big Bounce footage supplied by the Prelinger Archives; 2. Involuntary Dance 4 (credited as Involuntaries 4) by Foofwa d'Imobilité, Vea Lucca, and Alan Sondheim; 3. "Buchstabe" music video by Knorkator; 4. Title sequence† by Mark Phillips; 5. Title stock footage provided by iStock; 6. Modern Daydreams 1: Deere John by Mitchell Rose and BodyVox; 7. Break-dancer stock footage provided by iStock; 8. "Protective Cover (The Condom Song)" music video by Nrityanjali Academy; 9. Indian Dancing Prank by Christian von Nathusius; 10. Angry Industrial Dancer in Little Saigon by Duy Huu Luu, a.k.a. Tank Nine; 11. "Tush It" music video by Liam Lynch; 12. "Vessel (Four Tet Remix)" music video by Bison; 13. Peacock Spider by Jurgen Otto; 14. Robots Dancing by Jean-Charles Bazin and Young Cheol Lee (+8); Featured songs: 1. Involuntaries 4 score by Alan Sondheim; 2. "Buchstabe" by Knorkator; 3. Modern Daydreams 1: Deere John score by William Goodrum; 4. "5 AM (I Love My Haters)" by Clams Casino; 5. "Protective Cover (The Condom Song)" by the India HIV/AIDS Alliance; 6. "Electrohead" by Combichrist; 7. "Tush It" by Liam Lynch; 8. "Vessel" (Four Tet Remix) by Jon Hopkins; 9. "Woof Woof" by Dan Deacon; 10. "She's Hot" by Clams Casino
4	4	"Space"	November 5, 2011	104	N/A
Staring lovingly into the cold infinite void that will one day kill us all. Featured videos: 1. Freedom 7 footage supplied by NASA and the Internet Archive; 2. Cat In Zero Gravity (credited as Porculpa – Your Fault) by Lyn Hagan; 3. Space background provided by iStock (uncredited); 4. Astronaut watching television footage provided by Getty Images; 5. Title sequence† by Adam Fuchs; 6. Toy Robot in Space! by James Trosh; 7. Giant Leap by Kyle Botha; 8. Zeroing by Andrey Nepomnyaschev; 9. Space Ghost character by Alex Toth feat. the voice of George Lowe (+3); 10. HELL/????? by David OReilly (credited as Dddaaavviiidd Ooooooorreeillllyyy); 11. Outside In excerpt by Stephen Van Vuuren; 12. Noisebox in Space by Dog Judo (credited to 12foot6); 13. "A Glorious Dawn" music video by John Boswell; 14. "Quantum Leap" music video by Thomas de Rijk; 15. Apollo 11 launch footage supplied by NASA, telecine supplied by Spacecraft Films (+2; +6); Featured songs: 1. "The Grey Ship" by EMA; 2. Zeroing score by Studio Takt (uncredited); 3. "Requiem, KV 626: Sequentia, Lacrimosa" by Wolfgang Amadeus Mozart (uncredited); 4. "Terra Incognita" by Atlas Sound; 5. "A Glorious Dawn" for the Symphony of Science feat. Carl Sagan; 6. "Quantum Leap" by Slugabed; 7. "Decollage" by Les Balayeurs du désert; Note: Space Ghost's quote was taken directly from the Space Ghost Coast to Coast episode "In Memory of Elizabeth Reed".
5	5	"Body"	June 1, 2012	105	1.1
This is you. Explore your deep caverns. Consume yourself. Featured videos: 1. cords (hear us and have mercy) by Sara Lundberg; 2. Visible Human Project provided by the United States National Library of Medicine; 3. Opening stock footage provided by iStock and Archive.org; 4. "All Ways" music video by Color Chart; 5. Take This Pill by David Firth; 6. going to the store by David Lewandowski; 7. Woman touching face stock footage provided by iStock; 8. Hot Dog Hustle by Thomas Hunter; 9. SyncBody by Daihei Shibata, art by Hiroshi Sato; 10. Sossidge Arms animated shorts by Chriddof; 11. GoPro on a Hula Hoop by Nick Saik; 12. Amalgamide Tide by Taras Hrabowsky; 13. Stinks by Glogman Johns; 14. 15 Denier by Harry Handyside (+1); Featured songs: 1. A cappella performance by Linda Ohlin, Carina Aronsson, Gustav Nordlander, and Carl Slettengren; 2. "Quitters Raga" by Gold Panda; 3. "All Ways" by Corduroi; 4. "Little Ships" by Jean-Jacques Perrey; 5. "PLMS_IV_D" by Yaporigami and +MUS; 6. "Cafe Bossanova" by Mike Garson (uncredited); 7. "Baby's Arms" by Kurt Vile; 8. "Pigsy in Space" by Damon Albarn (credited as Monkey)

=== Season 2 (2012–13) ===
No. overall	No. in season	Title	Original release date	Prod. code	US viewers (millions)
6	1	"Falling"	August 28, 2012	201	0.8
Everything will be ok. The natural feeling of dread. Featured videos: 1. Experience Human Flight by InfinityList (credited as Infinity Lift); 2. Falling to Hell† by Devin Flynn; 3. "My Machines" music video by Daniels; 4. Giant 6 ft. Water Balloon by Gavin Free; 5. Dog catching frisbee footage provided by iStock; 6. Milk glasses footage provided by Corbis; 7. Hövding in Action video supplied by Hövding; 8. In the Fall by Steve Cutts; 9. Valse Statique et la Theorie du Combo by Maxime Bruneel; 10. Fugue/Trampoline performance by Yoann Bourgeois for ZAT! Montpellier; 11. Derty Falling by Taras Hrabowsky (+1); Featured songs: 1. "The Vision" by Ian Brody; 2. "Raygun" by Van Basten (uncredited); 3. "My Machines" by Battles feat. Gary Numan; 4. "Lo Lindora" by Kodak to Graph; 5. "New Direction" by Black Lips; 6. "Oceanview" by Atlas Sound; 7. "Coming Down" by Dum Dum Girls
7	2	"Color"	October 30, 2012	202	1.1
Collect them all. Like smells for your eyeballs. Featured videos: 1. LSD Girl footage supplied by T3Media; 2. Head On by Lior Ben Horin; 3. Kristi's Shotgun Rainbow (credited as This Girl Can Handle a Shotgun!!) by Brandon Gibson; 4. "Grindin'" music video by Rogier van der Zwaag; 5. The Biggest Domino Circle – 11,000 Dominoes! YouTube Record! by TheRealMcJoni and TheDominoator; 6. Dahlia by Michael Langan; 7. Fireworks footage provided by iStock; 8. "The Doldrums" music video by Plastic Horse; 9. "Dinosaurs" music video by Kristofer Ström; 10. Paint advertisement for Sony Bravia by Fallon London; 11. Gummy bear footage provided by iStock; 12. "Datamosh" music video by Yung Jake; 13. Bars & Tones by Andrè Chocron; 14. Optimist by Brian Thomson (+1); Featured songs: 1. Head On score by Nadav Ravid (uncredited); 2. "Heart of America" by The New American Ensemble (uncredited); 3. "Grindin'" by Nobody Beats the Drum; 4. "The Doldrums" by Paul White; 5. "Dinosaurs" by 16bit 6. La gazza ladra performance by the Czech Philharmonic, conducted by Senja Karel; 7. "Datamosh" by Yung Jake; 8. "Perpetuum Mobile" by Penguin Cafe Orchestra, arranged by Andrè Chocron; 9. "Serve The People" by Handsome Furs
8	3	"Nightmares"	December 22, 2012	203	1.3
They don't only happen while you're sleeping. You're having one right now. Featured videos: 1. Real Demons Caught on Tape by Justin Martinez; 2. Mask image provided by iStock; 3. "Plaster Casts of Everything" music video by Patrick Daughters; 4. Superduper by Thomas de Rijk; 5. Coaster Test by Steve Cutts; 6. Headcleaner by Alessandro Bevari (credited as a music video); 7. Her Lovely Fears by Ben Wheele; 8. Homelands by Jimmy Joe Roche; 9. Zombie Bands Suck† by Liam Lynch; 10. You Ruined It† by Michael Langan; 11. Crooked Rot by David Firth (+1); 12. Fear photographs provided by Nightmares Fear Factory; 13. Credits image editing† by Geoffrey Lillemon, Christy Karacas, R. Land, Brandon Lively, Dax Norman, Trey Wadsworth, and Terry White; 14. Credits stock images and cockroach footage provided by iStock; Featured songs: 1. "Journeyman" by Amon Tobin; 2. "Plaster Casts of Everything" by Liars; 3. Superduper score by Thomas de Rijk; 4. "Headcleaner" by Einstürzende Neubauten; 5. "Dust Flesh and Bones" by Matt Elliot; 6. Crooked Rot score by Marcus Fjellström; 7. "Battery Point" by Beak
9	4	"Light"	October 1, 2013	204	0.9
Brighter than a thousand digital suns. Featured videos: 1. Combustion by Renaud Hallée; 2. Title sequence† by Adam Fuchs (credited as Chill Fuse); 3. "Natural Thing" music video by Johan Rijpma; 4. Light Drive by Kim Pimmel; 5. Glowing Man by Jacob Sutton; 6. Jelly Trip Experience by Burkhard Reike; 7. Dubstep Dispute by Jason Charles Giles; 8. Flawed Symmetry of Prediction by Jeff Frost; 9. "Seeing Things" excerpt from Fun to Imagine feat. Richard Feynman, footage supplied by T3Media; 10. "The Sky Was Pink" music video by Morgan Beringer; 11. I See You by Jacob Streilein; 12. Light by David Parker (+1); Featured songs: 1. "Natural Thing" by Nobody Beats The Drum; 2. "Candy Shoppe" by Emeralds; 3. "Knights of Cydonia" (Nostalgia Dubstep remix; credited as Dubstep Dispute music) by Andrew Hill; 4. "Seeing Things" audio by Richard Feynman; 5. "The Sky Was Pink" by Vessels; 6. Light score by Peter Lauridsen (uncredited)

=== Season 3 (2013–14) ===
No. overall	No. in season	Title	Original release date	Prod. code	US viewers (millions)
10	1	"Nature"	December 31, 2013	302	1.0
Love it or leave it. Featured videos: 1. Visions of the Wild by the United States Department of Agriculture, supplied by the Prelinger Archives; 2. "Brats" music video by Ian Cheng; 3. Hyper Geography by Joe Hamilton; 4. Eagle-owl stock footage provided by Getty Images; 5. Sun rising footage provided by iStock (uncredited); 6. 24,480 Minutes with an Australian Tree Fern (credited as Australian Tree Fern) by The Upthink Lab; 7. Fungia Food by Coral Morphologic; 8. "Staring Out the Window" music video by Ninian Doff; 9. Woos by PetPunk; 10. "What's Up?" music video by Liam Lynch; 11. A Walk in the Woods (credited as Walk in the Woods) by Weebl; 12. Madam Butterfly by Gabriel Kempers; 13. Land by Masanobu Hiraoka (credited as Hiraoka Masanobu); 14. "The Ghostly Voices Once Said!" music video by Randy Knott (+1); Featured songs: 1. "Brats" by Liars; 2. "Into the Deep Time (One Sun)" (credited as "Into The Deep Time") by Candy Claws; 3. Fungia Food score by Coral Morphologic; 4. "Staring Out the Window" by Fulton Lights; 5. Woos score and audio by Huma-Huma (uncredited); 6. "What's Up?" by Liam Lynch; 7. "Humming Chorus" by Giacomo Puccini, performance by Apollo Symphony Orchestra; 8. Land score by Aimar Molero (uncredited); 9. "The Ghostly Voices Once Said!" by Randy Knott; Note: The eagle-owl stock footage from Getty Images is reused from the music video for Mike Jourgensen's song "Eye Drops" that show creator Dave Hughes and his company Million Monkeys Inc. directed.
11	2	"Robots"	January 7, 2014	301	1.2
They're on to us. Featured videos: 1. Jelly Wobbler by Nik Ramage; 2. Robot footage supplied by DigInfo; 3. Ants in My Scanner by Francois Vautier; 4. Robogran by Cyriak Harris; 5. "Kill Your Co-Workers" music video by Mike Winkelmann (credited as Beeple); 6. Michael by Space Shower Networks Inc.; 7. God Knox by Kokofreakbean; 8. "Boss Wave" music video by Kristofer Ström; 9. OstrichCopter by Pricordia, footage supplied by Viral Spiral; 10. Raw Data by Jake Fried; 11. BigDog Beta by Pantless Knights; 12. Machinery footage provided by iStock; 13. Drawing Apparatus by Robert Howsare; 14. AI vs. AI by Igor Labutov and Jason Yosinski; 15. Aerial Technology demo reel footage provided by Uncage the Soul (+2); Featured songs: 1. "Andrew" by Jonwayne; 2. "Blinding" by Zach Schimpf (credited as Zack Schrimpf); 3. "Kill Your Co-Workers" by Flying Lotus; 4. Michael score by Satoshi Sasaki and Handsome Trucks (uncredited); 5. God Knox score by Kokofreakbean (uncredited); 6. "Boss Wave" by Xilent; 7. "Concertissimo 1" by Otto Sieben (uncredited); 8. Raw Data score by Jake Fried (uncredited); 9. "Dental Fur" by Freescha; Note: Although this episode aired the week after the episode "Nature", Adult Swim lists this to be set before that episode.
12	3	"Worship"	April 22, 2014	303	1.0
This train will be making all stops between Everything and Nothing. Featured videos: 1. Sadhus: India's Holy Men by Bedi Films and Denis Whyte; 2. Smoke footage provided by iStock (uncredited); 3. Buddhist monk footage provided by Getty Images; 4. "Bye Bye Macadam" music video by Dimitri Stankowicz; 5. Hypnogogs by Paul Hartner; 6. Jesus Pwn3d U by Barats and Bereta; 7. Doom II: The Circular Ruins by Scott Gelber (credited as Noah Spidermen); 8. Unabomber Speckles drawing provided by R. Land; 9. Stock images provided by iStock (uncredited); 10. Enter the Mystic† by Dax Norman; 11. God Smash† by Taras Hrabowsky; 12. Totem† by Caleb Wood; 13. "Magma" music video by The Vein (credited as Dvein); 14. Astroblast, Univers 01.7 (credited as Astroblast) by Alexandre Lehmann (+1); Featured songs: 1. "Cannons" by Little Scream; 2. "Bye Bye Macadam" by Rone; 3. "Action Therapy" by Steve Everitt (uncredited); 4. "The Circular Ruins" by Zac Traeger; 5. "Christian Connections" by Longmont Potion Castle; 6. "Bummer Dreams" by Elvis Depressedly; 7. "Magma" by The Vein; 8. "Jesus Was Way Cool" by King Missile

=== Season 4 (2014–15) ===
No. overall	No. in season	Title	Original release date	Prod. code	Viewers (millions)
13	1	"Hair"	September 2, 2014	401	N/A
The tangled web we weave. Featured videos: 1. Words of Wisdom from an Unexpected Citizen (credited as Words of Wisdom) by Matthew Silver and Rony Portillo; 2. Flora by Aaron Michael; 3. Hairsperiments and other animations by Mike Winkelmann (credited as Beeple); 4. Woman flipping hair stock footage provided by iStock; 5. Beach Bums† by the Great Nordic Sword Fights; 6. Virtual reality haircut simulator footage by DigInfo; 7. The Chronicles of Peen-Eye (credited as Wigella)† by Geoffrey Lillemon feat. Marian Mudder (uncredited), robotics by Neil Mendoza; 8. Hair Growth Experiment by David Birdsell; 9. The Fly† by Liam Lynch; 10. "Ascension" music video by Charles Bergquist (credited to Tycho; +3; +7); 11. robothair.mov by Bernardo Britto; 12. Hairy Monsters by Gerald Zahn; 13. "Memime" in Haircut Store by Alan Resnick (credited as an original short); 14. Frilled lizard stock footage provided by Corbis Motion (uncredited; reused from the first episode "Animals" with an animated wig); 15. Shake by Carli Davidson and Variable (+1); Featured songs: 1. "Time" by Hans Zimmer (uncredited); 2. "Backwell" by Beak; 3. Beach Bums score† by Groundislava; 4. "Cut the Mullet" (credited as "Cut That Mullet") by Wesley Willis; 5. Also sprach Zarathustra by Richard Strauss (uncredited); 6. "Ascension" by Tycho; 7. robothair by Bernardo Britto; 8. "Memime" in Haircut Store score by Billy Joel (uncredited); 9. "The Dancing Master" by Jeremy Barlow (uncredited); 10. "Shave My Pussy" by Chad VanGaalen; Note: Gerald Bald Z of Perfect Hair Forever makes a cameo in the "Virtual Reality Haircut Simulator" segment.
14	2	"Sports"	December 23, 2014	402	1.1
Arbitrary goals, invented glory, permanent brain damage. Featured videos: 1. Your Highness by Max Hattler; 2. Cheering crowd footage provided by iStock; 3. Oolympacs† by Johnny Woods; 4. Ribbon dancer and football player footage provided by iStock; 5. Exploding watermelon footage provided by iStock; 6. "Bim Bam Boom" excerpt from Forbidden Zone dir. Richard Elfman; 7. Magic Ball Man by Maximilien Czech; 8. Cody Jumps Skip by PixelWorkers; 9. "I Didn't Know That" music video by The Books; 10. Frisbee God† by Malcolm Sutherland; 11. Ghillie Ball† by Dave Hughes, Adam Stockett, and Alan Steadman; 12. Data by Mark Fingerhut (credited as WOLFSHIRT); 13. Citius, Altius, Fortius by Felix Deimann; 14. Red Bull Winch Sessions footage courtesy of Red Bull Media House North America, Inc. (+1); Featured songs: 1. "Feel the Drip" by Black Moth Super Rainbow; 2. "Bim Bam Boom" by Miguelito Valdés and Kipper Kids (uncredited); 3. "All That Matters" by Professor Kliq; 4. "I Didn't Know That" by The Books; 5. "Airlock" by Bayou; 6. Citius, Altius, Fortius score by Kreng (uncredited); 7. "Instant Disassembly" by Parquet Courts
15	3	"Death"	December 30, 2014	403	1.0
Life without the hassle of living. Featured videos: 1. One Got Fat film supplied by the Prelinger Archives; 2. Yield by Caleb Wood; 3. Stillicide by Eric Ko; 4. Woman blowing dandelion footage provided by Getty Images (credited to iStock); 5. "Beat the Drum Slowly" music video by Chad VanGaalen (uncredited); 6. UFO† and Crowd Dynamics by David Fothergill; 7. "Arterial" music video by Christophe Thockler (uncredited); 8. Checkpoint† by Robby Rackleff; 9. Death Fest† by Kutay Cengil; 10. The Jump by Charles Huettner; 11. Life Is Flashing Before Your Eyes by Vince Collins (+1); Featured songs: 1. "Nature Girl" by Roger Webb (uncredited); 2. "Dream House" by Deafheaven; 3. Stillicide score by Alex Cook; 4. "Beat the Drum Slowly" by Timber Timbre; 5. "I'll Be There" by Steve Vaus (uncredited); 6. "Arterial" by Lusine; 7. "Ocean Death" by Baths; 8. "Life is Flashing Before Your Eyes" song by Lewis Motisher
16	4	"Transportation"	January 6, 2015	404	N/A
From here to there, but never back again. Featured videos: 1. Gravity by Hadas Fisher-Oren; 2. Title sequence† by Tori Cook; 3. JP Auclair excerpt from All.I.Can by Sherpas Cinema; 4. Departures by Cy Kuckenbaker; 5. The Motorcade† by Colin White, written by William Stitt (both credited as International Geographic); 6. Rollerman by Danny Strasser; 7. METRO Re/De-construction by Christopher Douglas Coleman; 8. Psycho City by Vince Collins; 9. Bubblegum Fannypack† by Richard "Dicko" Mather; 10. Let's Paint, Bicycle & Blend TV by John Kilduff; 11. Sketch Three: Avant-Garde (R.P.M. 2) by Ryan Fox; 12. "Cadillac Dreams" music video by the Great Nordic Sword Fights; 13. Scene 2 by Kim Laughton; 14. 3K Project TrackMania 2: Canyon (Slow Mo Version) by RickardRick (+1); Featured songs: 1. "The Lens" by Thee Oh Sees; 2. "Dance Yrself Clean" by LCD Soundsystem; 3. Rollerman score by Michael Beckmann and Melina Fessmann; 4. "Flute Flight" by Piero Piccioni (uncredited); 5. "Cadillac Dreams" by Birdy Nam Nam; 6. "Rain on a Highway" by Daughn Gibson

=== Season 5 (2015) ===
No. overall	No. in season	Title	Original release date	Prod. code
17	1	"Liquid"	July 21, 2015	501
Slippery when wet. Featured videos: 1. Run Walter Run video provided by Newsflare; 2. Phantom Water Reel by Chris Bryan; 3. Helium Shark by Thomas Marque; 4. Ice Crystal Timelapse by Shawn Knol; 5. Ice cream video† by Alan Steadman; 6. Machine Networks 2013 by Ryan Tyler Martinez; 7. Most Incredible Volcano by Geoff Mackley; 8. BBBB by Natalia Stuyk; 9. A Family Affair by Ed Schrader, Kevin Sherry, and John Voigt; 10. Bubble Device #2 by Nicholas Hanna; 11. "Bryn Marina" music video by David Jude Harris; 12. Water splashing stock footage provided by iStock; 13. Splashy Duck by William Anderson; 14. Atomic bomb footage provided by VCE Digital, Inc.; 15. The Huber Experiments – Vol. 2 by Erik and Matthew Huber; 16. Vagabond Mutant Liquid† by Tobias Stretch; 17. Dry Lights by Xavier Chassaing; 18. Drainage Ditch Kayaking (credited as Kayakers in Drainage Ditch) by Rush Sturges and Ben Marr (+1); Featured songs: 1. "Parade (Dominik Eulberg remix)" by Rone; 2. Machine Networks 2013 score by Jad Atoui (uncredited); 3. "Summer Storm" by Fox + Sui; 4. "Bryn Marina" by Sound of Ceres; 5. "Vertical" by Vessels; 6. "Great River Road" by Zach Schimpf; 7. Dry Lights score by Thomas Vaquie; 8. "The Mountain Dew" by The Clancy Brothers
18	2	"Conflict"	October 27, 2015	502
Straight blasting Ron. Featured videos: 1. Anatomy of a Street Fight: How to Win When You're Outnumbered by Don Wasser from PFS Video, Inc.; 2. Bloops† by Johnny Woods; 3. Title sequence animations† by Sean Buckelew, Kyle Mowat, Jonathan Djob Nkondo and Caleb Wood; 4. "Green" music video by bif, produced by Mill+; 5. Plug Party 2k3 by Albert Omoss; 6. Unabomber Speckles drawing provided by R. Land; 7. Stock images provided by iStock; 8. Angry Ram Destroys Punching Bag by Marty Todd; 9. Pivot by Albert Omoss; 10. The Angry Prokaryote by Caleb Phoenix Pleasant; 11. Cody's Positive Affirmations by Joseph Bennett; 12. SSI's Shred of the Month: "The Monster" footage provided by SSI Shredding Systems, Inc.; 13. 31 Ways to Say Fuck Off (credited as "31 Ways to Say F#@k Off") by Emanuele Kabu (+1); Featured songs: 1. "Thug It Out" by TT the Artist; 2. "Green" by Azel Phara; 3. "Squid Sandwich" by Longmont Potion Castle; 4. "The Picture" by Ty Segall; 5. Cody's Positive Affirmations score by Mike Jansson, voices by Cory Blische and Brandon Blische (all uncredited); 6. "Scud Books" by Hudson Mohawke
19	3	"Holes"	November 24, 2015	503
There's one beneath you right now. Featured videos: 1. DIY Weatherize Hole Tutorial by Alan Resnick (credited as alantutorial); 2. Opening stock footage provided by Pond5 and Shutterstock; 3. Inside Me by Dmitry Zakharov; 4. Abstraction 48 by Morgan Beringer; 5. Rejected excerpt by Don Hertzfeldt; 6. Loop Hole† by Drew Tyndell; 7. "Boys Latin" music video by Isaiah Saxon and Sean Hellfritsch; 8. Down the Rabbit Hole by Merijn Hos; 9. Stare Down by Michael Shanks; 10. Shelter by Carl Burton (+1); Featured songs: 1. "Léviathan" by Flavien Berger; 2. "Nu är det jul igen" by Mads Hansen (uncredited); 3. "Tenderly Dream" by Gerhard Trede (uncredited); 4. "Boys Latin" by Panda Bear; 5. "Left Speaker Blown" by Liars
20	4	"NEWNOW"	December 29, 2015	504
Now, new. This episode celebrates New Year's Day and the show's fifth anniversary, setting six original songs by various artists to miscellaneous videos. Featured videos: 1. Title sequence† by Natalia Stuyk; 2. "Birds of Paradise" segment from Planet Earth (credited as "BBC Birds of Paradise") supplied by Getty Images; 3. Bird of Paradise Hook Up by Jamie Margary; 4. Amalgam by Jack Turpin; 5. Totally Normal† by Andrew Benson; 6. Hug advertisement for John Lewis by Julia Pott; 7. Ghillie OneWheel footage† by David Lewandowski; 8. "Morgan 3000" music video by Benjamin Janos-Szabo Hunter, originally for the song by Huntress Janos; 9. BDAY/KSS/TMLSS/LST_RLM by Kidmograph; 10. Landscapes by Amy Lockhart; 11. Drone footage by Renee Lusano; 12. Cavernous Womb† by Annapurna Kumar; 13. "Girl Seizure" music video by Gabriel Mangold, originally for the song by Last Ex; 14. Still Life by Kevin Eskew; 15. Swirls† by Masanobu Hiraoka; 16. Wake Up to the New Now by Matthew Silver; Featured songs: 1. "Pursuer"† by Sound of Ceres; 2. "It Can Feel So Good"† by Zammuto; 3. "What's It Like There Tomorrow"† by Zach Schimpf; 4. "I Think I'm A Ghost"† by Ed Schrader's Music Beat; 5. "Change Your Life (You Can Do It)"† by Dan Deacon; 6. "Laurie"† by EMA; The following artists provided additional animated loops: Zachary Zezima, Kevin Eskew, Annapurna Kumar, Julia Newhide, Jack Turpin, Alan Jennings, Andrew Benson, Allegra Jones, Adriana Trukillo, Benjamin Janos-Szabo Hunter, Rachel Seropian, Tim Brown, Gina Maune, Dina Kelberman, Kaylee SooHyun Lee, Ana Mouyis, Sian Bliss and Maureen Kuo. Note: Adult Swim posted an "Analog Video Remix" of this episode by Rob Feulner on their YouTube channel on January 26, 2018.

=== Season 6 (2016–17) ===
No. overall	No. in season	Title	Original release date	Prod. code	US viewers (millions)
21	1	"Shapes"	May 24, 2016	601	N/A
$H&P3$ Featured videos: 1. Pendulum Waves provided by Harvard Natural Science Lecture Demonstrations; 2. Title sequence animations† by Drew Tyndell (credited as Computer Team) and Emanuele Kabu; 3. Cat statue footage provided by Getty Images; 4. Cymbals Whacked excerpt by ChefSteps; 5. Illusions (Part One) by Animal Inc.; 6. "Slowly Rising" music video by Hideki Inaba; 7. Octopus footage provided by Getty Images; 8. Undercurrents by Albert Omoss; 9. The Summoning of the Skylark by Cool 3D World; 10. "AS Chingy" music video by Sam Rolfes; 11. Cat Loop† by Jeron Braxton; 12. "Glore" music video by Nicos Livesey; 13. "Micro (twist)" music video by Jonathan McCabe (+1; +5); Featured songs: 1. "Dot Com" by Battles; 2. "Traces" by Motion Sickness of Time Travel; 3. "Slowly Rising" by Beatsofreen; 4. "PGRM 85" by Flavien Berger; 5. "AS Chingy" by Amnesia Scanner; 6. "Glore" by Radkey; 7. "Micro (twist)" by Juj
22	2	"Clowns"	September 20, 2016	602	N/A
No Clowns were harmed in the making of this video. Featured videos: 1. "Delmax Siefbecq" music video by Clowncore; 2. Title sequence† by Bent Image Lab; 3. Night Clowns† cinematography by Jonathan Rej, performances by Chris Brown, Gilbert Moreno, Jeanne Wesson, Erin McDowell, Chris Croasdale, David Gregory, Ben Bladon, Brandon Hughes, Daniel Price, Jacob Sharpe, Yelandria Phillips, John Clifton, Marjory McKinnon, Anna Thornton and Allison Cohen; 4. Call Your Parents (credited as Clown Rave 2016)† by Kytten Janae; 5. Unabomber Speckles drawing provided by R. Land; 6. Stock images provided by iStock (uncredited); 7. Clown Center by Dylan Jones; 8. Wig (credited as Wigz)† by Robby Rackleff; 9. Clown face stock footage provided by Getty Images; 10. Wrinkles Steals Kids Balloons excerpts by Cary Longhamps (of Anomalous Films); 11. Clown Drone by Renee Lusano (+4; +1); Featured songs: 1. "Delmax Siefbecq" by Clowncore; 2. "Beautiful You Me" by Vessels; 3. Call Your Parents score† by Philip Rugo (uncredited); 4. "Clown Motel" by Longmont Potion Castle; 5. "Wurly Surprise" by Dirty Dick and Carrie Harry (uncredited); 6. "Creepy" by Ronald James (uncredited); 7. "Honeyed Words" by Anna Meredith
23	3	"Work"	November 8, 2016	603	0.6
A Q4 analysis. Featured videos: 1. Il Capo (credited as Ill Capo) by Yuri Ancarani; 2. Handshake stock footage provided by iStock; 3. Magic Cube and Ping Pong by Lei Lei; 4. Psychometrics by Alan Warburton; 5. Gummie Chernobyl by Ian M. Miller; 6. Desktop Deltaware† by Mark Fingerhut; 7. Hands: They're Here to Stay† by Tyler Russo; 8. "Hands" stock footage provided by iStock; 9. Banjo Gyro! by Grady Sain; 10. "True Vulture" music video by Galen Pehrson, produced by Sara Cline and the Masses (latter uncredited); 11. Monster V by Steven Lapcevic; 12. Pizzocalypse† by Kokofreakbean; 13. "Never Get Ahead" footage from Chic-a-Go-Go provided by Jake Austen (+1); Featured songs: 1. "Minimum Wage" by They Might Be Giants; 2. "Getting the Done Job" by The Books; 3. Conference call audio by Zach Scott; 4. Desktop Deltaware song† by Joe George; 5. Hands: They're Here to Stay audio by Tyler Russo; 6. "True Vulture" by Death Grips; 7. "Never Get Ahead" by Bobby Conn; Note: While audio from Hands: They're Here to Stay by Tyler Russo plays, stock footage supplied by iStock is reused from the episode "Body".
24	4	"Words"	January 31, 2017	604	N/A
Now with 50 percent less meaning! Featured videos: 1. Boogodobiegodongo by Peter Millard; 2. "Ummm" music video by Jeron Braxton; 3. Network of Learning† by Peter Burr, programming by Mark Fingerhut; 4. Word Game† by Dimitri Stankowicz; 5. Ascetic Aesthetic† by Dax Norman; 6. Men in Chairs by Cool 3D World; 7. H3adz† by Larry Carlson; 8. Stop Requested† by the Great Nordic Sword Fights; 9. Girls Night Out† by Geoffrey Lillemon; 10. Last Words† by Colin White (credited as Colin E. White), written by William Stitt; 11. Word of the Day† by Lila Burns; 12. Advice for the Modern Worker† by Annapurna Kumar; 13. Einstein's Shower Speech by Einstein the Talking Texan Parrot (+1); Featured songs: 1. "Du Bist Die Ruh" by Franz Schubert, arranged by Fiachra Trench and Elaine Barry (uncredited); 2. "Ummm" by Jeron Braxton; 3. Network of Learning sound† by John Also Bennett; 4. "House" by Hypo & EDH; 5. Ascetic Aesthetic score† by Dave Merson Hess; 6. H3adz score† by Larry Carlson (uncredited); 7. Girls Night Out† sound by Dylan Gelletly; 8. "Soul Limbo" by Giuseppe Vadalà and Giorgio Cuscito (uncredited); 9. Word of the Day score† by Brent Busby (uncredited); 10. "Weazil Poppin" by David Wesley (uncredited); 11. "She Dies" by Johann Lestat (uncredited); 12. "Bittersweet" by Paradise Lost

=== Season 7 (2017) ===
No. overall	No. in season	Title	Original release date	Prod. code
25	1	"Earth"	November 21, 2017	701
You break it, you buy it Featured videos: 1. ReflectionVOID (credited as Reflection Void) by Lance Page; 2. Monkey Dreams by Rebecca Shenfeld, footage provided by Getty Images; 3. Lingua Naturae and Deep Time by Julius Horsthuis; 4. When Humans Ruled the Earth by Stephen Ong; 5. "Whale" music video by Pavel Samokhvalov; 6. Digital Nature† by Cristopher Golden (credited as The Studio Gold); 7. Mr. Madila by Rory Waudby-Tolley; 8. "Woodswimmer" music video by Brett Foxwell; 9. Mushroom Timelapse by Eric Deren; 10. The Infinite Now (credited as Infinite Now) by Armand Dijcks and Ray Collins (+1); Featured songs: 1. "A New Day" by Kaitlyn Aurelia Smith and Suzanne Ciani; 2. "My Body's Made of Crushed Little Stars" by Mitski; 3. "Strangeworks" by Eluvium; 4. "Surprise Stephani" by Dan Deacon; 5. "Whale" by Samoe Bolshoe Prostoe Chislo (credited as SPBCh); 6. Digital Nature score† by Fresh Hex (uncredited); 7. Mr. Madila score by Paul Devlin (uncredited); 8. "Woodswimmer" by Bedtimes; 9. "Ageless" by House of Wolves
26	2	"Technology"	November 28, 2017	702
404 Not Found Featured videos: 1. My Expanded View by Corey Hughes; 2. AB95† by Wham City Comedy; 3. Glucose by Jeron Braxton; 4. Hand scrolling stock footage provided by iStock (uncredited); 5. Scissorhands Unboxing† by Thu Tran; 6. Doorcuts by Zak Tatham; 7. Why Cecco Beppe Does Not Die (Scratch 'n Sniff Edition) by Ben Coonley; 8. Day Off 1 by Jillian Mayer; 9. Robotomy† by Sam Hochman and Alex Reynolds; 10. End of Simulation† by Milton Melvin Croissant III; 11. Lyrica by Shana Moulton (+2); Featured songs: 1. "Montealto" (credited as My Expanded View Music) by Alexa Silva and Nerftoss; 2. AB95 music† by Geoff Graham; 3. Glucose score by Jeron Braxton (uncredited); 4. Scissorhands Unboxing music† by Matt Fitzpatrick; 5. "Full Circle" by Billie Fingers, Bruce Fingers, and Daniel Suett (credited as Doorcuts music by Man Made Hill); 6. Why Cecco Beppe Does Not Die (Stratch 'n Sniff Edition) music by Shy Layers; 7. End of Simulation sound design† by Ryan McRyhew; 8. Lyrica music by Drew Swinburne; Note 1: This episode was guest curated and produced by Wham City Comedy (Ben O'Brien, Robby Rackleff, and Alan Resnick). Note 2: No individual songs are given titles in this episode; the credits simply include a "Music by" credit for most of the videos.
27	3	"Paradise"	December 5, 2017	703
Lost and Found Featured videos: 1. Intro animation† by Ricky Jonsson Jr.; 2. Interstitials† by Sam Hochman and Kristel Brinshot; 3. Isla's Day† by Jeremy Sengly and Winona Regan (+2); 4. Autonomous Paradise† by Filip Kostić (+2); 5. SMITE† by Thomas de Rijk; 6. The Jungle† by Joseph Melhuish (+2); 7. Yeasties by Jordan Speer, video processing by Robert Beatty (+2; +3; +2); 8. Pin Pon (gameplay trailer) by Theo Triantafyllidis (+1; +6); 9. LadyPecs blasterX† by Andy and Sam Rolfes (+2; +3); 10. Selfish workers by Alexandre Louvenaz (+2); 11. Quiet Time† by Elenor Kopka; 12. Intergalactic Absurdism† by Tea Stražičić; 13. Server Ho† by Andrew Thomas Huang (+2; +3; +2); 14. Basilisk† by Geriko (+2; +3); 15. Sunset† by Ezra Miller; 16. GIFs† by Jeremy Sengly and Winona Regan (+3); Featured songs: 1. Intro music† by Ricky Jonsson Jr.; 2. Isla's Day music† by Skillbard; 3. Autonomous Paradise music† by Roger Hallaway; 4. SMITE music† by v1984 5. The Jungle music† by Iglooghost (credited in upper cases); 6. Yeasties music by Zak Alkek (+2); 7. Pin Pon (gameplay trailer) music by Slugabed; 8. LadyPecs blasterX music† by Sam Rolfes (+2); 9. Selfish workers sound design by Thomas Cappeau; 10. Quiet Time music† by Elenor Kopka; 11. Intergalactic Absurdism and Server Ho music† by bod [包家巷] (+2); 12. Basilisk music† by Rusbaci (+2); 13. Sunset music† by Skillbard (+2); Note 1: This episode was guest curated and produced by Ghosting.tv (Ricky Jonsson Jr. and Kristel Brinshot). Note 2: No individual songs are given titles in this episode; the credits simply include a "Music by" credit for most of the videos.

=== Season 8 (2018–19) ===
No. overall	No. in season	Title	Original release date	Prod. code
28	1	"Health"	May 29, 2018	801
9 out of 10 doctors disagree Featured videos: 1. Family Dance by Alan Resnick; 2. Girl Puddle† by Dr. D. Foothead; 3. Morning Wormhole† by Kokofreakbean; 4. My Daily Routine #TearItUpGetFit by Simple Town; 5. Wound Treatment by Meditech Communications; 6. Doctor stock footage provided by iStock (uncredited; reused from "Body" and "Work"); 7. Dry Run (credited as Trolval)† by Felix Colgrave; 8. Getting Fit by Buttered Side Down (+6); 9. Presenting Oscar, The Modular Body by Cornelis Vlasman (credited to VPRO Television & seriousFilm); 10. Sommets 2017 by Brandon Blommaert (+1); Featured songs: 1. Family Dance music by Matmos; 2. Girl Puddle music† by Nicolas Snyder; 3. Morning Wormhole music and sound design† by Kokofreakbean; 4. My Daily Routine #TearItUpGetFit music by Kyle Rodriguez; 5. "Assault" by Youth Team; 6. "Burn It Out" by Douglas Young (uncredited); 7. "If I Were Human" by BNNY RBBT
29	2	"Love"	August 28, 2018	802
It's inside of you right now. Featured videos: 1. A/S/L: Darcy† by Sophie Koko Gate; 2. Stained Glass and the Sun by Julius Horsthuis; 3. Melting Together† by Andrew Benson; 4. The Fortune Teller (credited as Fortune Teller)† by Lila Burns; 5. KittyKat96 by Victoria Vincent; 6. I'm Dead Inside by Daniel Britt (credited as Dan Britt); 7. Unabomber Speckles (credited as Unaspeckles) drawing provided by R. Land; 8. Stock images provided by iStock; 9. Sour† by Daniela Sherer; 10. Valentine's Day is Not for the Lonely (credited as Valentines Day) by Jack Stauber; 11. Crazy Shit (credited as Crazy Sh!t) by Daniel Koren; 12. "Deetian Love Song" music video by Liam Lynch (+1); Featured songs: 1. A/S/L: Darcy music† by Jerry Paper, sound design by Skillbard, narrated by Vincent Oliver (latter uncredited); 2. "Eden V" by Sound of Ceres; 3. KittyKat96 score by Dean Pattinson (uncredited); 4. I'm Dead Inside song by Daniel Britt; 5. "Donut Handler" by Longmont Potion Castle; 6. Sour music and sound design† by Skillbard; 7. Valentine's Day is Not for the Lonely song by Jack Stauber; 8. "Deetian Love Song" by Liam Lynch
30	3	"Sound"	October 30, 2018	803
Listen with your eyes. Featured videos: 1. Clowds by Laurie Catherine Winkel; 2. "Girl's Night Out" music video† by Clowncore; 3. Prebirth† by Mike Diva, produced by Josh Shadid/Lord Danger; 4. Sensitive Hearing† by Christopher Rutledge; 5. Dolphin Poem (credited as Dolphin Emoji)† by Julian Glander; 6. Hand stock footage provided by iStock (uncredited); 7. Wet Sound Enlightenment (credited as Augenlied) by Kymat (credited also to Junopilot); 8. The Choir by Cool 3D World; 9. Chimera† by Caleb Wood; 10. The Offering† by Elenor Kopka; 11. The History and Future of Listening by Lucy Dyson (+2); Featured songs: 1. "Girl's Night Out"† by Clowncore; 2. Prebirth score† by Kill Dave (uncredited); 3. Sensitive Hearing† score and audio by Myles Emmons (uncredited); 4. Dolphin Poem† by Julian Glander; 5. "Augenlied" by Junopilot; 6. The Choir music by George Michael Brower; 7. Chimera music and sound design† by David Kamp; 8. The Offering music and sound design† by Skillbard; 9. "No Words" by Nick Rattigan (credited as Current Joys; +1)
31	4	"Winter"	January 1, 2019	804
The ultimate bookend to humanity. Featured videos: 1. Bubbles Freezing In Slow Motion by Adrian Ybarra; 2. Epic Catch footage provided by Viralhog, LLC; 3. Title sequence† by Emanuele Kabu; 4. Litter Yeti† by Solomon Burbridge, Greg Arden and Rob Shaw, story by Shively Humperdink; 5. Frost Responder† by Sam Hochman and Alex Reynolds; 6. Arctic fox excerpt from Life Story provided by Getty Images; 7. Dusk Walk† by Kate Renshaw-Lewis; 8. "Hope" music video by Thomas Vanz; 9. Yule Log 2.0 (credited as Yule 2.0) project by Daniel Savage, animations by Gentleman Scholar, Emmett Dzieza, Eric Epstein, Erik Karasyk, Adam Grabowski, Brett Refner, Drew Tyndell (credited as Computer Team), Joe Ball, Denny Khurniawan, Claire Kang, Matthias Hoegg and Kouhei Nakama; 10. Freezing Bubble Mixture by Chris Broste; Featured songs: 1. "VLI" by Skee Mask; 2. "At Sunrise" by Youth Team; 3. Litter Yeti song† by Shively Humperdunk; 4. "Bubbles Buried in This Jungle" (credited as "Bubbles Buried In The Jungle") by Death Grips; 5. Dusk Walk score† by Zane Taylor and Cedar Lange; 6. "Hope" by Max Cooper; 7. "Nordlicht" by Flug 08

=== Season 9 (2019) ===
No. overall	No. in season	Title	Original release date	Prod. code
32	1	"Fashion"	September 3, 2019	901
Got you covered. Featured videos: 1. Leigh Bowery footage from The Clothes Show provided by Getty Images; 2. Fall/Winter 2059† by Andy and Sam Rolfes; 3. Kinetic Salad Man by David Henry Nobody Jr.; 4. "Horse" music video by Vedran Rupic; 5. Dondus Fingertrap† by Felipe Di Poi Tamargo, script by Steven Markow; 6. Bookaka† by Kokofreakbean; 7. Unabomber Speckles drawing provided by R. Land, animation† by Jordan Gum; 8. Stock images provided by iStock (uncredited); 9. Sewing machine footage provided by iStock (uncredited); 10. Mr. Blessing Man† by Qieer Wang; 11. "Heavy Metal" music video by Filip Nilsson; 12. A Dance Video by Aaron Whitney Bjork (+1); Featured songs: 1. Fall/Winter 2059 music† by Rabit; 2. "Horse" by Salvatore Ganacci; 3. Dondus Fingertrap voice† by Steven Markow; 4. "Pleated Approach" by Longmont Potion Castle; 5. "Heavy Metal" by Justice; 6. "Baby's Tears Blues" by Mort Garson
33	2	"Trash"	October 29, 2019	902
Everybody's doing it. Featured videos: 1. Quentin and His Birdbox Orchestra by Sean Reynard; 2. Garbage Rave by Yilmaz Sen; 3. Fruit images provided by iStock (uncredited); 4. Opening titles† by Thomas Deininger; 5. Trash dumping footage provided by iStock (uncredited); 6. Extrapolate by Johan Rijpma; 7. Bambi† by Joseph Melhuish; 8. Global Warming by Koba K24; 9. Garbage truck image provided by iStock (uncredited); 10. Pretty† by Mary Dauterman; 11. The End Is Equal† by Shively Humperdink; 12. Open Ocean† by Nate Milton; 13. #DISRUPT† by Matt Reynolds; 14. Bulldozer footage provided by iStock (uncredited); 15. Plastic Dreams by Bureau Klaus Alman (+1); Featured songs: 1. "Gnossienne No. 1" by Erik Satie, performed by Sean Reynard (uncredited); 2. "Got Wet in the Bomb Shelter" by Tobacco; 3. "Snowblind" by Tanya Tagaq; 4. Open Ocean music† by Buck St. Thomas; 5. "Cherry Picking" by Thierry Caroubi (uncredited); 6. "A Talk Inside the Piano" by The Secret Whistle
34	3	"Fire"	November 26, 2019	903
It's all around you. Featured videos: 1. Lava Steak by Jenny Wysocki and Robert Wysocki (latter uncredited); 2. Kilauea: The Fire Within by Lance Page; 3. Fire Flowers by Jeff Lower; 4. Drone Fireworks by Mikal Jakubal; 5. Human Torch by John Walton (+2); 6. Fire Escape by Mikey McCusker; 7. Light Me Up† by Caitlin McCarthy; 8. RIP by Cyriak Harris; 9. Eruption by Steven Markow, animated by Cole Kush and Derrick Guerin; 10. Sunspots by Morgan Beringer; 11. Strange Dream by Alfie Dwyer; 12. Viking Funeral† by Sanjay Jit; 13. Neighborhood Renewal† by Matt Reynolds, backgrounds by Olga Sokal, animation assistance by Ingo Raschka, Kevin Eskew, Micah Stahl and Luca Depardon; 14. Forest Fire by Kevin Gautraud (+1); Featured songs: 1. "Birth" by Rari; 2. Light Me Up† music and sound design by Skillbard; 3. RIP score by Cyriak Harris (uncredited); 4. Eruption narration by Maria Micklasavage; 5. "Freedom" by Moodie Black; 6. "Aquarium (A Cappella) Underscore" by Camille Saint-Saens, arranged by Paul Sandrone (uncredited); 7. "Praeludium No. 1, C Major" by Johann Sebastian Bach, arrangement by Daniel Philipp Stotz; 8. "Someday We'll Linger In The Sun" by Gaelynn Lea
35	4	"Patterns"	December 31, 2019	904
Watch, rinse, repeat. Featured videos: 1. Airshow footage provided by iStock (uncredited); 2. Opening titles† by Adam Fuchs; 3. "Repetition" (credited as "Repetitions") music video by Kevin McGloughlin; 4. Historical Patterns† by Robby Rackleff; 5. The Blank Page† by Jake Fried; 6. How to Stop by Sofia Pashaei; 7. Where's Walter? by Michela M. Smith and Lucien Flores; 8. Body Patterns by Milo Targett; 9. "Someday" music video by Páraic McGloughlin (+1); 10. The Big Bounce footage supplied by the Prelinger Archives (uncredited); Featured songs: 1. "Luminosity" by Pendle Poucher (uncredited); 2. "Repetition" (credited as "Repetitions") by Max Cooper; 3. "Someday" by Weval

=== Season 10 (2020) ===
No. overall	No. in season	Title	Original release date	Prod. code
36	1	"Coping"	June 9, 2020	1001
You are not alone. Well, maybe a little bit. Yeah, definitely pretty much alone. Featured videos: 1. Hitting My Head On The World by Anna Vasof; 2. A New Level Of Archery by Lars Andersen (credited as Lars Anderson); 3. "Stand There" music video by Vincent Bilodeau; 4. Stay Home 4 (credited as Stay Home 04) by Arnaud Laffond; 5. Men in Chairs 2 by Cool 3D World; 6. Window Advice by Alan Resnick; 7. 0% Food by Lukas Vojir; 8. April 23, 2020 (credited as Pizza Challenge) by Ernest Doty; 9. Everybody Isolates by Snuff Puppets; 10. "The Rest of My Days" music video by Jack Antoine Charlot (credited to S+C+A+R+R); 11. First Contact by Douwe Dijkstra and Jules van Hulst (+2); Featured songs: 1. "Welcome To Youth Team Enterprises" by Youth Team; 2. "Stand There" by P'tit Belliveau; 3. Stay Home 4 score by Tite; 4. "Alone Again" by Kent Carter (uncredited); 5. 0% Food score by Resonate; 6. "The State" by Youth Team; 7. "The Rest of My Days" by S+C+A+R+R (credited as S.C.A.R.R.); 8. "I Have Heard the Signal, I Am Waiting for the Call" by Youth Team
37	2	"Dreams"	December 29, 2020	1002
Trying to keep up with reality. Featured videos: 1. "Sick Of Being Honest" music video by Mike Diva; 2. "Into Promenade" music video by Yoshi Sodeoka (credited as a short); 3. Terror Fervor by Phoebe Parsons (+2); 4. Dream World Fun World by Render Fruit; 5. 2 Lizards – Episode 2 by Orian Barki and Meriem Bennani; 6. "Very Noise" music video by Meat Dept.; 7. Dream Of A Dog† by Maddie Brewer; 8. Tofu Chan – Love Is A Fractal by Dylan Jones and Joset Gatti; 9. Dreams† by Anna Firth; Featured songs: 1. "Sick Of Being Honest" by Milkblood; 2. "Into Promenade" by MYMK; 3. 2 Lizards music by Coqueta; 4. "Very Noise" by Igorrr; 5. Tofu Chan music by jperl, voice by Tomoya Kawasaki; 6. "Baby, It's Time" by Psychic Markers
38	3	"Progress"	December 29, 2020	1003
Comfort is the enemy. Featured videos: 1. Just Setting Off by Alfie Kungu; 2. Harvest Bounty by Sam Lyon; 3. Future Beach by Nadia Lee Cohen; 4. Positive Mental Attitude by James Papper; 5. Bunny World† by Victoria Vincent; 6. ungabarn† by Rosco 5; 7. whoisyoulmao by James Papper; 8. I Want to Be the Ocean† by Raman Djafari; 9. gloogigigation by Renee Zhan; 10. USB Dog† by Sam Campbell and Joe Pelling; 11. The Breakup by James Papper; 12. The Community That Sings Together by Jonathan Zwanda; 13. Cyber Commune by Harriet Davey; 14. Coexist by Michael Marczewski; 15. Teeter† by Jordan Brookes and Ewan Jones Morris; 16. Lockdown Proposal Goes Horribly Wrong (credited as Rube Goldberg Machine) by Demi Lardner and Tom Walker; Featured songs: 1. The Community That Sings Together score by Mark Pritchard; 2. "Good Love 2.0" by Priya Ragu; 3. "Ouster Stew" by Crack Cloud; Note: This episode was guest curated and produced by Blink Industries.

=== Season 11 (2021) ===
No. overall	No. in season	Title	Original release date	Prod. code	US viewers (millions)
39	1	"Family"	October 12, 2021	1101	N/A
The deepest connection. Featured videos: 1. Road Trip by Darío Alva; 2. Horsin' in the V.O.I.D. (credited as Horsin' in the Void) by Dave Biddle; 3. "2.02 Killer Year" music video by Sophie Koko Gate, Jack Wedge and Will Freudenheim (latter uncredited); 4. Dinner Time† by Maylee Todd and Kyvita; 5. "All of a Sudden" music video by Laraaji; 6. 4orm (credited as Train Ride) by world4Jack (credited as Jack); 7. Family Supper† by Dan Streit, starring Kerwin Frost; 8. Laughing Stock by Derrick Guerin, Fraser Jones, Anthony Banua-Simon, Danielle Slaughter, Terence Chiyezhan and Alexandra O'Driscoll; Featured songs: 1. Road Trip music by Diego Navarro; 2. Horsin' in the V.O.I.D. music by Linda Fox; 3. "2.02 Killer Year" by King Gizzard & the Lizard Wizard; 4. "All of a Sudden" by Laraaji; 5. "Swheat" by Neve; 6. Family Supper† music by Garrett Rowley (+2); Note: This episode was guest curated and produced by Cole Kush.
40	2	"Moon"	November 9, 2021	1102	N/A
The Moon is an egg. Featured videos: 1. MOON TITLE† by Matthew Taylor; 2. Moon Tube 1 2 & 3† by Jack Wedge, Will Freudenheim and Sophie Koko Gate; 3. Moon† by Yoriko Mizushiri; 4. Lunar Love & Ever† by Gabriel Gabriel Garble; 5. CH4RMPIX† by Claudia Mace (+2); 6. "Why The End Of The World Has Not Yet Come" music video by Haomin Peng; 7. Moon Hoax† by Harrison Fishman; 8. MUKBANG!† by Cheng-Hsu Chung; 9. Blue Moon Over My Hammie† by Michael Arcos (+2); Featured songs: 1. Moon Tube 1 2 & 3† music by Will Freudenheim; 2. Moon† music by Kengo Tokusashi; 3. CH4RMPIX† music by Carlos Saez; 4. "Why the End of the World Has Not yet Come" by Cocoonics; 5. "For Britney" by Philippe Bestion (uncredited); 6. MUKBANG!† music and sound design by Skillbard; 7. "Elevator" by David O'Brien (uncredited; heard over the Williams Street logo); Note: This episode was guest curated and produced by Sophie Koko Gate.
41	3	"Touch"	December 27, 2021	1103	N/A
In the flesh. Featured videos: 1. Heart to Mouth by Bart Hess; 2. Hands parting footage provided by iStock (uncredited); 3. Quentin's Secret Pelican Button† by Sean Reynard; 4. The Galactic Trial by Joel Haver; 5. Absence by Alex Goddard; 6. Manipulation 6† by Baron Lanteigne; 7. Kaduna by Jacob Jonas The Company & Critics Company; 8. "Color Me" music video by Martin de Thurah; 9. Contour by Wow Inc.; Featured songs: 1. "Born, Never Asked" by Laurie Anderson; 2. Manipulation 6† music by Eduardo Noya Schreus; 3. "Color Me" by Active Child; 4. "ULTRAPOP" by The Armed; Note: This episode was guest curated and produced by Alan Steadman.
42	4	"Liminal"	December 27, 2021	1104	N/A
You are at the threshold. Featured videos: 1. "High/Low Agitation" music video by Mat Ball; 2. Blue abstract footage provided by iStock (uncredited); 3. Cazimi by Natalia Stuyk; 4. Tennis Ball's Day Off† by Julian Glander; 5. Tennis player footage provided by iStock (uncredited); 6. Liminal Space Recreated by Nik Maierle; 7. Bette† by Mary Dauterman; 8. Music Theory to Explain God's Absence by Ben Levin; 9. Beings in Between† by Johnny Woods; 10. Order & Chaos by Thomas Vanz (mistakenly credited as a music video); Featured songs: 1. "High/Low Agitation" by Mat Ball (credited as "from Labour Saver by Mat Ball"); 2. "Neptune Raining Diamonds" by Deafheaven; 3. Tennis Ball's Day Off† narration by Claire Cottrill and Karsten Runquist (both uncredited); 4. "Tsukiji" by Sly & The Family Drone; 5. "Beefed Up Beeps" by Mark Nolan and David Redwitz (uncredited); 6. Music Theory to Explain God's Absence music by Ben Levin; 7. Excerpt from Coincidence of Opposites by Alan Watts; 8. "Melt" by Supertask; 9. Order & Chaos music by Max Cooper, narration by Gracy Hopkins (latter uncredited); Note: This episode was guest curated and produced by Cody DeMatteis.

=== Season 12 (2022) ===
No. overall	No. in season	Title	Original release date	Prod. code	US viewers (millions)
43	1	"Nonsense"	July 4, 2022	1201	N/A
To be eaten with a runcible spoon. Featured videos: 1. Gabbagooblins† by Joe Cappa; 2. Nonsense Titles† by Max Landman; 3. "Weird Part of the Night" music video by Louis Cole; 4. My Pea by umami 5. Dewdge Center† by Eoin O' Kane, written by Brooks Allison; 6. "We Go Back" music video by Winston Hacking; 7. Pastor Josiah† by Tom McDonald; 8. egg touching (credited as Touch The Egg) by Peter Millard; 9. Fingertips† by Phoebe Parsons; 10. "Springtime Old Man" music video by Tsuchya Hoi; 11. The Shrewd Awakening by TOMASZEWICZ studio 12. My Foe (credited as My Pod) by umami 13. Doomscroll animation† by Maggie Brennan; 14. "I Need To Be Passed Away"† music video by Surfies (+1); Featured songs: 1. "Weird Part of the Night" by Louis Cole; 2. "We Go Back" by Animal Collective; 3. "Fingertips" by They Might Be Giants; 4. "Springtime Old Man" by Uri Nakayama; 5. "I Need To Be Passed Away"† by Surfies
44	2	"Bugs"	September 12, 2022	1202	N/A
They're under your skin. Featured videos: 1. The Spider by Milenics; 2. KHEPRI by Carlos Cortes Reyes; 3. Centipede footage provided by iStock (uncredited); 4. Excerpt from Eyeballs in the Darkness (credited as Tux and Fanny – Time To Go) by Albert Birney; 5. Pouffapillar by Pouff; 6. Midnight Ash† by Pilar Garcia-Fernandezsesma; 7. Synchronizing Fireflies (credited as Synchronicity (Thailand)) by Robin Meier and André Gwerder; 8. Ant Invasion† by Nicole Zaridze; 9. Mosquito by Noah Malone; 10. Earworm† by Bryan M. Ferguson; 11. Bugs Fly† footage by Dr. Adrian Smith, editing by Tomer Baruch / Animals and Synthesizers; 12. Cockroach footage provided by iStock (uncredited; reused from "Nightmares"); Featured songs: 1. "Peer Gynt, Suite No. 1 Op. 46" by Edvard Grieg (uncredited); 2. "(Nothing But) Ashes" by Röyksopp; 3. Mosquito music by Noah Malone; 4. Bugs Fly music† by Tomer Baruch / Animals and Synthesizers
45	3	"Bliss"	November 28, 2022	1203	N/A
Get you some. Featured videos: 1. Jim Denevan's "Angel of Repose" Desert X Allula 2022 footage by Lance Gerber; 2. Light/Atmosphere Studies by Zach Lieberman; 3. Let Loose by Erik Ferguson (credited as fergemanden); 4. Memory of Brittany by Benjamin Bardou; 5. Unabomber Speckles drawing provided by R. Land; 6. Glitter Bliss bokeh photography by Shawn Knol; 7. Stock images provided by iStock (uncredited); 8. Blessed† by Cool 3D World; 9. Polymorphic† by Michael McAfee; 10. Flow by Hideki Inaba; 11. Wave Pool in China footage provided by Aerialcollection; 12. Jim Denevan's "Radiating Sand Mounds" footage by Brighton Denevan; Featured songs: 1. "Regenerative Being" by Eluvium; 2. "Selfish Soul" by Sudan Archives; 3. "Deep in the Glowing Heart" by Jon Hopkins; 4. "Mysterious Bliss" by Longmont Potion Castle; 5. Blessed music† by Cool 3D World; 6. "Illusionary" by Drasko V 7. "Disconnected" by Zach Schimpf; 8. "Disappearing" by Low; 9. "Tezeta" by Mulatu Astatke; Note: An additional segment, Big and Small Night by Anna Seregina and Kyle Mizono, was commissioned for the episode, but wasn't included due to time constraints. The segment was uploaded online on December 23, 2022. The episode also features a small tribute to Low drummer Mimi Parker who'd passed away three weeks prior to the initial airing.
46	4	"Journeys"	December 26, 2022	1204	N/A
Bring snacks. Featured videos: 1. Blast Off by Rick Darge and John Weselcouch; 2. Title credits† by Cossa; 3. Door on the Left by Kati Skelton; 4. Lectures On Eternity† by The American Standard Film Co.; 5. Mike & Pima† by Sam Lane; 6. Couch† by Emma Debany; 7. Acid Rain by Tomek Popakul; 8. Wednesday with Goddard by Nicolas Ménard; 9. Excerpt from Solar Walk by Réka Bucsi; 10. Earth Crisis (credited as Now I Know (Earth Crisis)) by Isaiah Saxon; 11. "A Pearl" music video by Saad Moosajee, Art Camp, and Danaé Gosset (+1); Featured songs: 1. "Making Life out of Music" by Eye Q 2. "480p Melody" by Andrew Aguilera; 3. "Calamus" by Chuck Johnson; 4. "Now I Know" by Dirty Projectors; 5. "A Pearl" by Mitski; Note: This episode was guest curated and produced by Meghan Oretsky.

=== Season 13 (2023) ===
No. overall	No. in season	Title	Original release date	Prod. code	US viewers (millions)
47	1	"Sex"	December 19, 2023	1301	N/A
Better than drugs Featured videos: 1. Sexual Foot† by Alan Resnick; 2. "Bouncy Castle" music video by Nick DenBoer; 3. Missionary Pose† by Balázs Turai (credited as Balazs Turai); 4. Massaige by ZeroScope-XL (credited as Roope Rainisto); 5. f*ckai? (sexy) (credited as f*ckai (sexy)) by Jordan Clarke, written by ChatGPT; 6. "Touche" music video by Temple Caché (credited as Temple Cache); 7. Fine Dining† by Helen Rainer; 8. A Blue Ball by Sawako Kabuki; 9. Peachy Tongues by Jeremy Taylor; 10. Earth Embrace† by Emily Halaka; 11. Spiral by Matt Clark (credited as a music video; +1); Featured songs: 1. "Bouncy Castle" by Tommy Lee; 2. "Shiver" by Fever Ray; 3. f*ckai? (sexy) score by Thom Kolbe; 4. "Touche" by O'o; 5. "Quicksand" by Carter Watson; 6. "Spiral" by Pete Diggins
48	2	"Drugs"	December 19, 2023	1302	N/A
Better than sex Featured videos: 1. Drug Titles† by Angela Kirkwood; 2. Pill Dissolving In Water (credited as Dissolving Pill) by macrofying 3. Happy Happy Yay Yay by Mel Roach; 4. Refracted Light by Shawn Knol; 5. Illegal Drugs (credited as Illlegal Drugs and as a music video) by WeAreRBG (credited as Danny Jacobs, Darren Grodsky, and Jack Kinney); 6. Orogenesis by Boris Labbé; 7. Experimentalillness by Tobias Stretch; 8. And Then I Vanish by Cornel Swoboda (credited as a music video); 9. Is This What Kids are Into These Days? by Joseph Melhuish (+4); 10. Devil's Trumpet† by Maddie Brewer; 11. Verre D'eau (Glass of Water) by Francois Vogel; 12. Scanned a park and sky is falling apart (credited as Fall) by Nikita Diakur (+3); Featured songs: 1. "The Medium" by Toro y Moi feat. Unknown Mortal Orchestra; 2. Happy Happy Yay Yay score by Damien Clarke (uncredited); 3. "When I'm Happy" by Steffaloo (credited as Steffalon); 4. Illegal Drugs song by Chris Zezza (credited as Feff Zeffa); 5. Orogenesis score by Daniele Ghisi (uncredited); 6. And Then I Vanish score by Oliver Salkic; 7. Is This What Kids are Into These Days? score by Slugabed; 8. "It Is So Nice To Get Stoned" by Ted Lucas
49	3	"Music"	December 19, 2023	1303	N/A
Better than sex on drugs Featured videos: 1. Factory Fan Bass by Ei Wada and Teruo Takahashi (credited as ELECTRONICOS FANTASTICOS!); 2. Swimming Pool† by Natalia Ryss; 3. Hidden Talent by Rick Darge, John Weselcouch and Spooky Bonus (latter uncredited); 4. The Lost Suburbs by Felix Colgrave; 5. "Everything's An Ad" music video by Ryan D. Anderson; 6. Instrument of Chaos† by Sophie Hullinger; 7. Magic Buzz† by Julia Muller; 8. Fest by Nikita Diakur; 9. "Please Don't Use Drugs" music video by Gelbart; 10. Hydrate!† by Thomas Bryson-King; 11. Projection Visuals by Joanie Lemercier (+1); Featured songs: 1. "Fushigi Man" by Himuro Yoshiteru (credited as Himuro Yshiteru); 2. Hidden Talent score by Ben Crippin Taylor (uncredited); 3. "Everything's An Ad" by Ryan D. Anderson; 4. Magic Buzz score† by Xav Clarke; 5. "Please Don't Use Drugs" by Gelbart; 6. "Goodbye" by Chaunter feat. Dan Deacon
50	4	"Farts"	December 19, 2023	1304	N/A
Music of the gods Featured videos: 1. Godfart† by Michael Langan; 2. Cosmic Fart Trip† by Michael Lim (credited as Space Dawg); 3. Love Language by Rick Darge, written by Chris Candy; 4. Delilah† by Laura Jayne Hodkin; 5. Peditos (Little Farts)† by Rafillo; 6. Earth & Fire by Cool 3D World; 7. The Procedure (credited as The Procedure Pt. 1) by Calvin Lee Reeder; 8. Hydraulic Press Girl Compilation by Smac McCreanor; Featured songs: 1. Love Language score by James Michael Carroll; 2. "Multi-Family Garage Sale" by Land of the Loops

=== Season 14 (2024) ===
No. overall	No. in season	Title	Original release date	Prod. code	US viewers (millions)
51	1	"Cringe"	December 17, 2024	1401	N/A
Hurts so good. Featured videos: 1. Cringe/Cookie Titles† by Maddie Brewer, additional graphics by Christopher Rutledge; 2. Maddie Legroom Hijacking Incident† by Maddie Brewer (+1); 3. "All My Ladies" music video by Harrison Fishman; 4. That Could Not Have Possibly Gone Worse by Dax Flame and Joel Haver; 5. Dedicated To My Father† by Maks Rzontkowski (+2; +1); 6. Gimme 5† by YONK; 7. A Very Romantic Moment† by Carter Amelia Davis (+2); 8. Excerpt from Above the Clouds by Vivien Hársheygi; 9. Ghost Finders† by Simple Town (+2; +1); 10. Plane Entertainment by David Gelfand; 11. Shy Guy by Ted Peshak (uncredited; +2); 12. Boy Band† by Joe Cappa; 13. W3 US3D 2 H4V3 FUN† by Christopher Rutledge and Maddie Brewer (+1; +2); Featured songs: 1. Cringe/Cookie Titles score† by Ethan Brewer; 2. "All My Ladies" by Baauer; 3. Dedicated To My Father score† by Maks Rzontkowski; 4. A Very Romantic Moment score† by Carter Amelia Davis; 5. Boy Band music† by Dave Cappa; 6. W3 US3D 2 H4V3 FUN score† by Ethan Brewer; Note: This episode was guest curated and produced by Maddie Brewer.
52	2	"Plants"	December 17, 2024	1402	N/A
Our silent, screaming companions. Featured videos: 1. Xeriscape† by Bobby Lynge; 2. Plants Titles† by Freddie Crocheron, animated by Ian Ballantyne and Margaret Wang; 3. Plant Lab† by Dan Forke; 4. Happy Green by Sonyé Lim; 5. Hands feeling plants footage provided by iStock (uncredited); 6. Staghorn Sumac by Alexis Nikole; 7. NASA Stem Stars "Veggie" clip provided by NASA (uncredited); 8. Power Of The Sun† by Amir B. Jahanbin; 9. Excerpt from Rot by Arias Ziaee; 10. Lethe And Mnemosyne† by Sam Gurry; 11. Exorcism† by Cameron Granger, starring Hakim Callwood, Vivian Edoja, and Dom Deshawn; 12. "Anunnaki" music video by Silent Planet; 13. Hemp for Victory by the United States Department of Agriculture; 14. Plant Parade by Loulou João; 15. Miraculous Creature Gets Humbled On Camera† by Parker Davis and Harrison Wyrick; 16. Plant Death† by Jake Huffcutt; 17. Niko's Off of Townsend† by Ian Ballantyne (+1); Featured songs: 1. Happy Green score by Holly Waxwing and Isabel Watson; 2. Lethe And Mnemosyne score† by Jake Turpin; 3. "Anunnaki" by Silent Planet; 4. "Like A Kennedy" by Heart Attack Man; 5. "Not Even Sadness" by Karl Kuehn (credited as Gay Meat); Note: This episode was guest curated and produced by Sarah Schmidt, the creator of Gassy's Gas 'N Stuff, a series of shorts as part of Adult Swim Smalls.

=== Season 15 (2025) ===
No. overall	No. in season	Title	Original release date	Prod. code	US viewers (millions)
53	1	"Growth"	December 30, 2025	1501	N/A
Planting the pits of hell into a womb the size of madness. Featured videos: 1. Wonder by Mirai Mizue; 2. Flying Cats Pt. 3 (credited as Cosmic Zoomies) by UON Visuals; 3. Excerpt from Final Flesh by Vernon Chatman; 4. Street Race† by Christopher and Daniel Rutledge, animated by Tumblehead; 5. south african music tshetsha boys (credited as Tshetsha) by Richard Hlungwani and Nozinja; 6. Story From North America by Garrett Davis and Kirsten Lepore; 7. Excerpt from Hansel and Gretel by Cristóbal León and Joaquín Cociña; 8. Lovewatch by Harrison Atkins; 9. Excerpt from Fantastic Planet by René Laloux, provided by Argos Films; 10. Home Birth† by Cossa; 11. Goodbye Mr. Schizo† by Jack Stauber; 12. Iris by Remí Devouassoud; Featured songs: 1. "Vicious Circles" by Sinjin Hawke and Zora Jones; 2. "Miu" by Marina Herlop; 3. Street Race score† by Deaton Chris Anthony; 4. "Tshetsha" by Tshe-Tsha-Boys; 5. Story From North America song by Garrett Davis; 6. Fantastic Planet score by Alain Goraguer; 7. "Maniacs Living In Hell" by Coyle & Sharpe; Note: This episode was guest curated by Vernon Chatman.
54	2	"VR"	December 30, 2025	1502	N/A
Reality isn't real. Featured videos: 1. Hummingbird Simulator† by Mike Diva; 2. Curtains by Alfie Dwyer; 3. Apparitions I, II, III† by Dimitri Simakis and Suki-Rose; 4. Pepper's New Crib† by Kami EXP; 5. For Your Convenience† by Nobey One; 6. VRCeilingFan† by Thu Tran; 7. "Anyway U Want It" music video by Erin Murray (+1); 8. Coffee Date VR† by an0nymooose (credited as Anonymoose); 9. Roommate Contention† by Luka Big Pants (starring Nothin' But Lag and P4blo); 10. Asclepius† by Filip Ugrin; 11. CTRL-ALT-DELIRIUM† by Jimmy ScreamerClauz (+1); 12. Powervision† by Dream Computer; Featured songs: 1. Hummingbird Simulator score† by David Dahlquist; 2. "Whisper Touch" by Robert A. Howes, Barbara Courtney-King, William McGillivray and Steve Davies (uncredited); 3. Apparitions I, II, III score† by Ghoulskool; 4. "Anyway U Want It" by Bambina; 5. "Natalya" by Graham Kartna; Note: This episode was guest curated by Mike Diva and Dimitri Simakis.

=== Season 16 (2026) ===
No. overall	No. in season	Title	Original release date	Prod. code	US viewers (millions)
55	1	"Party"			
56	2	"Emotions"			

=== Specials ===
Title	Original release date	Prod. code	US viewers (millions)
"Dan Deacon: U.S.A."	July 6, 2013	S01	1.0
This 22-minute music video sets the last four songs of the Dan Deacon album America to videos pertaining to landscapes in the United States: 1. El hombre y la Tierra excerpt; Radical Updates† by Andrew Benson; 2. Cityscape Chicago by Eric Hines; 3. Space Station footage supplied by Image Science and Analysis Laboratory at NASA's John C. Stennis Space Center; Groosland by Dutch National Ballet, footage provided by Poorhouse International, Ltd.; CGI space objects† by Adam Bruneau; 4. American Harvest film supplied by Prelinger Archives; 5. Head On by Lior Ben Horin; 6. Murmuration by Liberty Smith and Sophie Windsor Clive; Cy's Sunrise Lefts by Cyrus Sutton and Korduroy.tv; Moonwalk performance by Dean Potter, cinematography by Reel Walter Productions, Ltd.; 7. Primavera concert videos by Tom Bingham, Gill Austin, Jonathan Rej, and Jeff Crocker; 8. Stone Mountain Ghillie Suits† feat. Cody DeMatteis and Zach White, cinematography by Alan Steadman
"Seramthgin"	November 1, 2014	S02	0.8
Won tghir eno gnivah er'uoy. Gnipeels re'uoy elihw neppah ylno t'nod yeht. This special plays the episode "Nightmares" in reverse. Everything shown is also inverted, while the "[adult swim]" logo remains normal. Featured videos: 1. Real Demons Caught on Tape by Justin Martinez; 2. "Plaster Casts of Everything" music video by Patrick Daughters; 3. Superduper by Thomas de Rijk; 4. Coaster Test by Steve Cutts; 5. Headcleaner by Alessandro Bevari (credited as a music video); 6. Her Lovely Fears by Ben Wheele; 7. Homelands by Jimmy Joe Roche; 8. Zombie Bands Suck† by Liam Lynch; 9. You Ruined It† by Michael Langan; 10. Crooked Rot by David Firth (+1); 11. Fear photographs provided by Nightmares Fear Factory; 12. Credits image editing† by Geoffrey Lillemon, Christy Karacas, R. Land, Brandon Lively, Dax Norman, Trey Wadsworth, and Terry White; 13. Stock images provided by iStock; Featured songs: 1. "Journeyman" by Amon Tobin; 2. "Plaster Casts of Everything" by Liars; 3. Superduper score by Thomas de Rijk; 4. "Headcleaner" by Einstürzende Neubauten; 5. "Dust Flesh and Bones" by Matt Elliot; 6. Crooked Rot score by Marcus Fjellström; 7. "Battery Point" by Beak
"Dan Deacon: When I Was Done Dying" "DDWIWDD"	March 24, 2015	S03	N/A
This five-and-a-half minute music video sets the song "When I Was Done Dying" by Dan Deacon from his album Gliss Riffer to original animations by nine artists (in chronological order): 1. Jake Fried; 2. Chad VanGaalen; 3. Dimitri Stankowicz; 4. Colin White; 5. Taras Hrabowsky; 6. Anthony F. Schepperd; 7. Masanobu Hiraoka; 8. Caleb Wood; 9. Kokofreakbean
