= Beak (disambiguation) =

A beak is an anatomical structure of birds and turtles, serving as the mouth and jaws.

Beak may also refer to:

== Anatomical structures ==
- Beak (bivalve), the oldest point on a bivalve mollusc's shell
- Beak (botany), a pointed projection on various plant parts
- Cephalopod beak, an 'inkfish' rostrum
- Rostrum (anatomy), various structures in fish, whales and invertebrates (colloquially called beak)

== Arts and entertainment ==
- Beak (band), an English experimental electronic rock music group
  - Beak (album), 2009
- Barnell Bohusk, a fictional Marvel Comics character
- "Beak", a Ty Beanie Buddy kiwi toy

== British slang uses ==
- Cocaine
- Head teacher
- One of the teaching staff at these public schools:
  - Charterhouse School
  - Harrow School
  - Eton College
- Human nose
- Magistrate (England and Wales)

== Other uses ==
- Beak Island, Prince Gustav Channel
- Beak, a type of molding
- Beak, a spout of a vessel such as a laboratory beaker

== See also ==
- Beakhead, a protruding structure on the bow of sailing ships
- Beakhead (architecture), a carved figure of Norman influence, usually in a church
- Parrot's Beak (disambiguation)
