= Beak 3 =

Studio album by Beak>
- Released: 21 September 2018
- Length: 43:45
- Label: Temporary Residence Limited

Beak> chronology
Beak 2 (2012)	Beak 3 (2018)

Professional ratings
Review scores
Source	Rating
The 405	7.5/10
AllMusic	4/5 stars
Crack Magazine	7/10
The Line of Best Fit	7/10
Loud and Quiet	10/10
PopMatters	8/10
Rolling Stone	3.5/5 stars
The Skinny	5/5 stars
Under the Radar	7.5/10

Beak 3 (stylized as >>> or Beak>>>) is the third studio album by British band Beak. It was released on 21 September 2018 under Temporary Residence Limited.

== Release ==
On 11 July 2018, the band announced the release of the album, along with the first single "Brean Down".

== Critical reception ==
Beak 3 was met with "generally favorable" reviews from critics. At Album of the Year, the album was given a 78 out of 100 based on a critical consensus of 11 reviews.

=== Accolades ===
Accolades for Beak 3
Publication	Accolade	Rank
BBC 6	BBC 6's Top 10 Albums of 2018	7
Drift Records	Drift Records' Top 100 Albums of 2018	39
Gigwise	Gigwise's Top 51 Albums of 2018	49
Loud and Quiet	Loud and Quiet's Top 40 Albums of 2018	20
Louder Than War	Louder Than War's Top 25 Albums of 2018	11
Norman Records	Norman Records' Top 50 Albums of 2018	22
Piccadilly Records	Piccadilly Records' Top 100 Albums of 2018	3
Rough Trade Records	Rough Trade's Top 100 Albums of 2018	60
Uncut	Uncut's Top 75 Albums of 2018	8
Under the Radar	Under the Radar's Top 100 Albums of 2018	72

== Track listing ==
Beak 3 track listing
No.	Title	Writer(s)	Length
1.	"The Brazilian"	Geoff Barrow; Billy Fuller; Will Young	4:12
2.	"Brean Down"	Geoff Barrow; Billy Fuller; Will Young	3:52
3.	"Birthday Suit"	Geoff Barrow; Billy Fuller; Will Young	4:32
4.	"Harvester"	Geoff Barrow; Billy Fuller; Will Young	3:04
5.	"Allé Sauvage"	Geoff Barrow; Billy Fuller; Will Young	7:26
6.	"Teisco"	Geoff Barrow	2:06
7.	"King of the Castle"	Geoff Barrow; Billy Fuller; Will Young	2:47
8.	"RSI"	Geoff Barrow; Billy Fuller; Will Young	3:36
9.	"Abbots Leigh"	Geoff Barrow; Billy Fuller; Will Young	6:37
10.	"When We Fall"	Geoff Barrow; Billy Fuller; Will Young	5:33

== Personnel ==
Musicians

- Geoff Barrow – lead vocalist
- Billy Fuller – guitar and bass
- Matt Williams – drums
- Will Young – backing vocals
- Harriet Wiltshire – cello
- Alison Gillies – cello
- Juliet McCarthy – cello

Production

- Shawn Joseph – mastering
- Stu Matthews – engineer
- James Trevascus – engineer

== Charts ==
Chart performance for Beak 3
Chart (2018)	Peak position
Belgian Albums (Ultratop Flanders)	141
Scottish Albums (OCC)	42
UK Independent Albums (OCC)	13
