= Food Party =

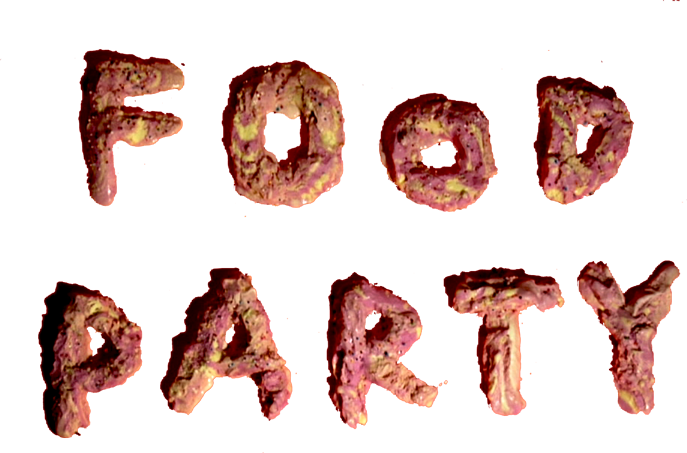
- Created by: Thu Tran
- Directed by: Zachariah Durr
- Starring: Thu Tran; Peter Van Hyning
- Country of origin: United States
- No. of seasons: 2
- No. of episodes: 26; 5 (Webisodes)

Production
- Running time: 9-16 minutes

Original release
- Network: IFC
- Release: June 9, 2009 – 2010

Food Party is an American television series that airs on the Independent Film Channel in the United States.

The show is a pseudo-reality cooking show filmed on an elaborate, technicolored cardboard kitchen set. Each episode features multi-course, out-of-this-world gourmet meals cooked up by hostess Thu Tran and a cast of colorful puppets for arriving "celebrity" guests.

The show was originally produced and filmed in Cleveland for two web series based episodes, and later relocated to Brooklyn for the final web series episodes and six IFC produced shows.

In October 2010, Thu Tran announced that the show was not picked up by IFC for a third season.

== Characters ==
=== Characters and crew ===
Name	Actor	Role
Thu Tran	Herself	Hostess and creator of Food Party.
"Man of a Thousand Faces"	Peter Van Hyning	Performs numerous voices and is featured as co-star, puppeteer, illustrator, and co-writer
Head Puppeteer	David Krofta	Serves as puppeteer, as well as prop specialist and co-writer
Puppeteer	Matt Fitzpatrick	Also co-writes and created the show's original score
Puppet maker	Daniel Baxter	Co-writer and creator of the show's myriad of puppets
Director, co-writer	Zachariah Durr	
Director of Photography, Special F/X	Steven Probert	

== Episodes ==
=== Season 1 (2009) ===
No.	Title	Original release date	Prod. code
1	"Thu Become One"	June 9, 2009	101
Thu Tran realizes she is in love with herself, and as any would-be bride, she prepares to be wed to Thu Number Two. Preparations include a hot-wing wedding cake, a bachelorette party, and finally, the wedding.
2	"Cave Duck"	June 16, 2009	102
A hunting expedition leads Thu to a nudist picnic, an underwater search for caviar, and finally, the Purple Potato Caves, where she kills a blue Cave Duck. Thu takes the duck home, but must use every part of the bird to appease the cave spirits.
3	"My Fair Maybe"	June 23, 2009	103
Tired of being the world's greatest cook, Thu visits the "Deli Llama" who advises her to take on a protégé. After the protégé learns everything and becomes a greater cook than Thu, Thu must kill him, to once again take her title as the Greatest.
4	"Applesode"	June 30, 2009	104
Thu invites Johnny Appleseed over after running out of apples for a recipe, then travels to Mount Avocado in search of the "White Tiger" apple, battling a viking heavy metal band on her journey.
5	"Thu's Cafe"	July 7, 2009	105
Thu's entrepreneurial spirit helps her survive after she is fired from selling gourmet foods at a boxing arena. She opens up her own restaurant, which instantly becomes a success. Stressed and overwhelmed, Thu simply poisons her customers with rotten ham salad to solve the problem.
6	"Horrosode"	July 14, 2009	106
Thu finds out she's going to have another baby, so she prepares a special dinner for her family. The evening is plagued with misfortune, and in a surprise turn of events, she gives birth to a kitten, all the while a villainous stranger stalks her home.

=== Season 2 (2010) ===
No.	Title	Original release date	Prod. code
1	"Thu Has A Normal Day"	TBA	201
Thu takes us through an average day, which includes stealing food and swimming with a whale.
2	"PBJ Love"	TBA	202
Peanut Butter Jerry's head swells after being stung by bees. He meets a gun-wielding woman at the doctor's, which leads to a relationship.
3	"Thu Strikes It Rich"	TBA	203
A normal night of cooking goes awry when a rich playboy crashes his car through Thu’s kitchen. He pays for the damage, but leaves his arm behind. Thu tries to think of ways to bring him back.
4	"The Emperor's New Dinner"	TBA	204
Thu has opened up the most high‐end restaurant imaginable, and the King of the Universe is coming to eat. But her balloon meal is ruined by a rogue panda.
5	"Deja Thu"	TBA	205
Thu's father reveals that she is adopted and gives her an envelope containing information about her biological family. Every effort she makes to locate her new family creates a repetitive loop that brings her back to the beginning of the episode.
6	"Turkeys"	TBA	206
Thu wins a game show and the grand prize is eight turkeys. She tries to devise eight separate types of turkey stuffing, then meets with her space engineer.
7	"NosferaThu"	TBA	207
Thu is a vampire. She hunts down a duck to use its blood in various vampire-themed recipes. The duck's owner attempts to take revenge for his duck's demise.
8	"Poopisode"	TBA	208
Thu covers the inside of her house with gingerbread and icing while Satan watches. She wakes in the morning and finds that someone has eaten her decorations and icing, and left gingerbread feces all over her kitchen. Thu sets up surveillance cameras to identify the culprit.
9	"The Oregano Garden"	TBA	209
Thu hosts a Martha Stewart type cooking & crafts show featuring a bounty of ideas using “oregano”.
10	"Cannibal Holiday"	TBA	210
Thu is stuck in her house after a blizzard. After finding she has no food in her house, Thu experiments with cannibalism.
11	"RV Episode"	TBA	211
Thu goes on a road trip to Las Vegas to visit a drive-in buffet. Along the way, she meets a mystical hobo and an intense policeman.
12	"Food Zombie"	TBA	212
Thu and friends become friends with a donut-loving zombie. The zombie uses an "Anti-Light Flashlight" to bring down the giant donut in the sky ([The Moon]), thus destroying mankind.
13	"Eggcino Man"	TBA	213
Thu's daughter finds an egg from which a wizard appears. When the egg wizard attempts to steal her daughter's eyes, Thu battles him, then befriends him.
14	"Mirror Diet"	TBA	214
The Mirror Diet Guru teaches Thu how to use mirrors to make her meal amounts seem larger.
15	"Zit Butter"	TBA	215
After getting sprayed with butter at the butter factory because of her rebelliousness, Thu's face begins breaking out. Rather than being pessimistic, she uses her new zits very resourcefully. Celebrity guests include Santa Claus.
16	"Sweet Sixteen"	TBA	216
It's Thu's birthday, as she does all the things teenagers do, as well as prepares food for her sweet sixteen party. Her father presents her with a special birthday gift, which gives her the confidence she needs to pursue her musical dreams.
17	"Ad Lib Episode"	TBA	217
Thu recounts the story of the donut, including the epic battle between the Moon and the spoon, before almost dying from eating hybrid monkey-pig meat.
18	"Koalisode"	TBA	218
While babysitting a koala, Thu experiments with vegan recipes, and clones Vincent van Gogh.
19	"Thu and Bu - Part 1"	TBA	219
In a version of "Cinderella," Thu is mistreated by an evil stepsister named Bu, marries a king and is killed by her evil stepmother.
20	"Thu and Bu - Part 2"	TBA	220
In Part Two of the story, the king wants to kill his wife for being lazy. While visiting Satan, the king realizes that his wife has been secretly replaced by her stepsister, and exacts revenge.
