= Parrotbill (disambiguation) =

Parrotbill or Parrot's bill may refer to:

== Birds ==
- Paradoxornithidaes, a group of birds native to East and Southeast Asia
  - Bearded reedling, also known as Bearded parrotbill
- Parrot crossbill, colloquially also known as parrotbill, a small passerine bird
- Maui parrotbill, a bird of Hawaii
- Parrotbill, a regional name for the auk

== Other uses ==
- Parrot's bill, alternative name of the two flowering plants in the Clianthus genus, native to New Zealand
- the beak of a parrot
- any tool in the shape of a parrot's beak, for example a type of pruning shears

== See also ==
- Parrot's beak (disambiguation)
