= Parrot's beak =

Parrot's beak may refer to:

== Plants ==
- Clianthus, a genus of flowering plants of New Zealand
- Lotus berthelotii, a perennial plant endemic to the Canary Islands
- Heliconia psittacorum, a perennial herb of the Caribbean and South America
- Pterostylis nutans, also known as parrot's beak orchid, an orchid of Australia and New Zealand

== Places ==
- Parrot's Beak, Cambodia, an area in Svay Rieng Province, Cambodia
- Kurram District, an area of Pakistan known as the Parrot's Beak to American military planners
- Parrot's Beak (Guinea), a region of Guinea traversed by the Mano River
- Parrot's Beak, a monolith on Mount Pico de Loro in the Philippines

== Other uses ==
- any tool in the shape of a parrot's beak, for example a type of pruning shears
- ukpe-okhue, a crown of the Benin Empire
- parrotbeak, an obsolete east English regional name for the Atlantic puffin
- "The Parrot's Beak", an autobiographical essay by South Asian American activist and writer Kartar Dhillon

== See also ==
- Parrotbill (disambiguation)
