= Mitchell Rose =

American film director

Mitchell Rose is an American director of short films known for comedic work and dance film. He began his career as a choreographer and performance artist and became known as "the dance world's Woody Allen" after being so dubbed by The New York Times. He then migrated to film and his works have won numerous awards, notably Elevator World, Modern Daydreams, and Learn to Speak Body. He tours a program called The Mitch Show which features his films and audience participation pieces.

== Dance ==
Rose was born in Boston, Massachusetts. He entered Tufts University in Electrical Engineering but soon discovered Modern Dance and became the college's first dance major. Following graduation in 1973 he moved to New York City where he studied at the studios of Alwin Nikolais, Merce Cunningham, and Viola Farber. He formed the Mitchell Rose Dance Company blending movement, acting, comedy, text, and projected images. He received a grant from CETA and from 1978–1980 performed extensively in New York City theaters, schools, universities, museums, hospitals, and prisons.

From 1980–1991 he toured his work internationally in various forms: solo, duet (with Diane Epstein) and group. Places of performance included the Spoleto Festivals in the U.S. and Italy, Jacob's Pillow, and Joseph Papp’s New York Dance Festival at the Delacorte Theatre in Central Park.

Rose created several audience participation pieces, including the 1985 work Walkpeople, in which seven audience volunteers received prerecorded choreographic instructions delivered from synchronized Walkman tape players worn by the performers.

Over the course of his dance career, he created 75 works, set pieces on 20 repertory and university dance companies, and was awarded five Fellowships from the National Endowment for the Arts.

== Film ==
In 1991 Rose became a Directing Fellow at the American Film Institute Conservatory. His MFA thesis, Helicopter, an urban drama, won seven festival awards including a CINE Golden Eagle.

In 2000, his animation Elevator World, a computer-animated essay on the spatial politics of elevating riding, won Grand Prize for Best Short at Slamdance Film Festival and was called “a computer masterpiece” by the CBS Evening News.

Also in 2000, Rose revisited dance when he received a fellowship from the Pew Charitable Trusts to explore ways of filming dance. During that fellowship he created Modern Daydreams, a series of four Chaplinesque films. One of these is Deere John in which a man dances a pas de deux with a 22-ton John Deere Excavator. Modern Daydreams, an example of Dance film (also called Videodance), won 19 film festival awards.

Modern Daydreams was made in collaboration with BodyVox dance company. Since then BodyVox has commissioned him to create six more short films. One of those, Learn to Speak Body, an exploration of body language in the form of a language instructional video, has three million hits on YouTube.

Rose has made 38 short films that have received 100 festival awards including the 1999 Grand Prize for Short Films at Slamdance and 2003 Distinguished Artist Award at the Napa Sonoma Wine Country Film Festival “In Recognition of Outstanding Achievement in the Field of Motion Pictures.”

In 2008 he began presenting The Mitch Show, a collection of his short films together with new audience-participation pieces. One of the latter is Podpeople, a descendant of his dance work, Walkpeople. Podpeople features five audience volunteers who receive dialogue and movement prompting from iPods as they integrate themselves into projected scenery. In June 2007 he presented The Mitch Show in Kosovo as a Cultural Envoy for the U.S. Department of State.

Rose has taught Dance-film at the California Institute of the Arts and Mills College and was a professor of Dance-filmmaking at The Ohio State University until 2021.

== Filmography ==
Obstructed View (2022)
Wehnu Saï (2021)
Attention Span (2020)
The Case Against Dance-Film: a disemPowerpoint (2020)
Internal Medicine (2019)
And So Say All of Us (2018)
The Icons (2017)
Cubed (2017)
Exquisite Corps (2016)
Targeted Advertising (2015)
Aura Lee (2015)
Globe Trot (2014)
Contact (2012)
A World Without Numbers (2010)
Advance (2009)
The Event (2006)
Learn to Phone Phony: Tape 2 (2005)
Metamorfishes (2004)
Name Categories (2004)
Prologue to the Opera Carmina Burana (2003)
Yoga Misinfomercial (2003)
Case Studies from the Groat Center for Sleep Disorders (2002)
Learn to Speak Body: Tape 5 (2002)
Modern Daydreams (2001) a suite of four films:

Treadmill Softly
Islands in the Sky
Unleashed
Deere John

Meredith Monk and Robert Een in the World Festival of Sacred Music (1999)
Elevator World (1999)
Weightless (1997)
Helicopter (1994)
Single White Male (1992)
A Nauseous Nocturne (1993)
The Wayfarer (1991)
