= Jack Stauber =

American musician and animator (born 1996)

- Born: April 6, 1996 (age 30)
- Education: University of Pittsburgh
- Occupations: Musician; animator; filmmaker; internet personality; artist
- Musical career
- Also known as: Jack Stauber's Micropop
- Genres: Avant-pop; synth-pop; hypnagogic pop
- Instruments: Vocals; keyboards; piano; drums; guitar; bass guitar
- Years active: 2007–present
- Label: Plopscotch Records
- Member of: Jack Stauber's Micropop
- Formerly of: Joose; Zaki; Oliver Bairens Productions
- Website: jackstauber.com

YouTube information
- Channel: JackStauber
- Years active: 2013–2021
- Genres: Music videos; animation
- Subscribers: 3.74 million
- Views: 823.7 million+
- Last updated: November 19 2026

Jack Stauber (born April 6, 1996) is an American musician, animator, filmmaker, and internet personality based in Pittsburgh. He is recognized for his VHS-aesthetic live action, stop motion, and computer animated music videos which have been featured in internet memes.

He has released the albums Finite Form (2013), Viator (2015), Reviator (2017) Pop Food (2017), HiLo (2018), and Opal (2020). The first two tracks of Pop Food, "Buttercup" and "Oh Klahoma", went viral on TikTok. In 2020, he won the Shorty Award in the Best in Weird category.

== Career ==
Stauber majored in marketing and minored in studio arts at the University of Pittsburgh in Pittsburgh, Pennsylvania. He fronted the band Joose. While he was a college senior, he joined Zaki, a band, as its lead singer and they released a self-titled album in 2018.

"Buttercup" was the first song released on his 2017 album Pop Food. The song, along with remixes and covers of it, became a popular internet meme, especially on TikTok, contributing substantially to its success. The song has 470 million Spotify streams as of March 2026, with its sound being described as "bubbly, dramatic pop with Panda Bear-esque vocals". "Oh Klahoma", the second track from Pop Food, became popular as well. The song is used as background music in a TikTok trend called #ghostphotoshoot, where creators dress up as ghosts and take photos of themselves, sometimes wearing sunglasses and other fashion accessories.

Additionally, Stauber publishes under the name "Jack Stauber's Micropop", releasing extended versions of short songs found on his YouTube channel. Under the Micropop name, Stauber has released six EPs and a compilation album, along with two soundtracks for his works with Adult Swim.

=== Adult Swim ===
The first short Stauber created for Adult Swim was called "Wishing Apple", a short released on July 3, 2018 on the Adult Swim YouTube channel. The next was "Valentine's Day is Not for the Lonely", which premiered on Off The Air's season eight episode "Love", on August 28, 2018. The short was released earlier, on Valentine's Day, February 14, 2018. The surrealist musical comedy "SHOP: A Pop Opera" premiered on Adult Swim in March 2019. The series utilizes mixed media, incorporates clay animation, music, and VHS-like filters. The six-part series aired each episode at midnight from March 4 to March 9.

A short surrealist musical psychological horror film, entitled "Jack Stauber's OPAL", premiered on October 30, 2020. On the same day, OPAL was also released on the Adult Swim YouTube channel. Stauber received help from the producers at Williams Street in Atlanta for the creation of OPAL. The film utilizes stop-motion, 3D-animated, and live action segments, and is about the effects of child neglect.

On December 30, 2025, Stauber's "Goodbye, Mr. Schizo" short premiered in the first episode of Off The Air's fifteenth season. (“Growth”)

== Style ==
"Buttercup"
Stauber's song "Buttercup", from his 2017 album Pop Food is a mix of pop and lo-fi, with an 80s and 90s aesthetic. The song is popular on the social media platform TikTok.

I get playful with the words but they’re always chosen very carefully. They all make perfect sense. I wouldn’t sing something if it didn’t.

— Jack Stauber, interview from NewRetroWave

Meg Fair of the Pittsburgh City Paper highlighted Stauber's knack of "pulling unrelated sounds and influences into [his] music, throwing them into a bowl and tossing them into a strange salad that challenges your musical taste buds". Jenna Minnig of PennState CommMedia compared Stauber's voice and hypnagogic pop style to Ariel Pink's. However she said it was reductive to compare the two. The Knoxville News Sentinel's Chuck Campbell said that Stauber's music videos are "nostalgic and childlike, but there’s also something disturbingly adult about them, the kind of thing that might have surfaced on Pee-wee's Playhouse back in the day".

=== Music ===
Stauber is well known for his hypnagogic pop, avant-pop, and synth-pop music. His unique vocal effects are developed in the shower, and are inspired by Donovan's song "Hurdy Gurdy Man". Stauber collects objects to create sounds to use in songs, and has a drawer filled with "various noise-makers" he has collected.

Indie singer-songwriter Sidney Gish and model Paris Jackson are among the artists expressing admiration for Stauber's music.

=== Videos ===
Stauber's videos utilize a mixture of different types of media like traditional animation, 3D computer animation, claymation, and live action. Almost all voices in the videos are done by Stauber himself. His videos are usually separated into three styles: "surreal", characters with odd and striking facial expressions and frequently part of his claymations, "colorful", which are usually featured in VHS animations and music videos, and "Stauber faces", light-skinned characters with cartoon noses.

Creating his animations, Stauber uses Microsoft Paint for the drawings. He then sequences the frames in Adobe Premiere Pro and then runs the finished video through a VHS tape. Teeth are often referenced in Stauber's music and videos, most often being fake teeth made of resin, although Stauber has used real teeth in his work before.

== Awards and nominations ==
Year	Organization	Award	Recipient	Result	Ref.
2020	Shorty Awards	Creative & Media: Best in Weird	Jack Stauber	Won	

== Discography ==
=== As Jack Stauber ===
==== Albums ====
Title	Details
Finite Form	Released: March 18, 2013; Label: Plopscotch Records; Format: Digital download, streaming
Viator	Released: September 18, 2015; Label: Plopscotch Records; Format: Digital download, streaming, CD
Pop Food	Released: March 25, 2017; Label: Plopscotch Records; Format: Digital download, streaming, CD, vinyl
HiLo	Released: April 14, 2018; Label: Plopscotch Records; Format: Digital download, streaming, CD, vinyl

==== Extended plays ====
Title	Details
Reviator (Note: Reviator is only viewable on Stauber's YouTube channel. It consists of three remade tracks from Viator, for its second anniversary.)	Released: September 18, 2017; Label: Plopscotch Records; Format: digital download, streaming

==== Singles ====
Title	Year	Album
"Help You"	2012	Non-album singles
"Axis of Dam"	2012	Non-album singles
"Lines"	2012	Non-album singles
"Summer Sickness"	2012	Non-album singles
"Left"	2012	Non-album singles
"Times"	2012	Non-album singles
"Juana Maria"	2013	Non-album singles
"Christ Potion"	2015	Viator
"Grins Hells"	2015	Non-album singles
"Tenderly"	2017	Non-album singles
"Oh Klahoma"	2017	Pop Food
"Dead Weight" (Note: Released only on YouTube.)	2018	HiLo
"Gettin' My Mom On"	2018	HiLo
"New Normal"	2020	Non-album singles

==== Certified songs ====
Title	Year	Certifications	Album
"Buttercup"	2017	BPI: Silver; RMNZ: Gold	Pop Food

==== Guest appearances ====
Title	Year	Other artist(s)	Album
"Not Yet"	2024	Ex Pilots	Motel Cable

=== Jack Stauber's Micropop ===
==== Albums ====
Title	Details
Micropop	Released: June 29, 2019; Label: Plopscotch Records; Format: digital download, streaming
Shop: A Pop Opera	Released: March 12, 2020; Label: Plopscotch Records; Format: digital download, streaming
Jack Stauber's OPAL (Original Soundtrack)	Released: November 6, 2020 (Note: also released under Adult Swim Smalls); Label: Plopscotch Records; Format: digital download, streaming

==== Singles and EPs ====
Title	Details
Inchman / Two Time	Released: June 4, 2018; Label: Plopscotch Records; Format: digital download, streaming
Cheeseburger Family / Fighter	Released: August 6, 2018; Label: Plopscotch Records; Format: digital download, streaming
The Ballad of Hamantha / Today Today / Al Dente	Released: November 5, 2018; Label: Plopscotch Records; Format: digital download, streaming
Baby Hotline / Tea Errors	Released: March 21, 2019; Label: Plopscotch Records; Format: digital download, streaming
Deploy / Those Eggs Aren't Dippy / Out the Ox	Released: November 4, 2019; Label: Plopscotch Records; Format: digital download, streaming
Dinner Is Not Over / There's Something Happening / Keyman / Cupid	Released: February 7, 2020; Label: Plopscotch Records; Format: digital download, streaming
