= Justin Martinez =

Justin Martinez or Justin Martínez may refer to:

- Justin Martinez (filmmaker) (born 1980), American filmmaker
- Justin Martínez (baseball) (born 2001), Dominican baseball player
