= BodyVox =

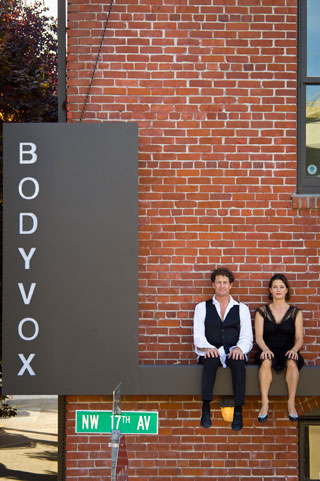
- The BodyVox Dance Center
- Formation: 1997
- Type: Dance company
- Official language: English
- Artistic Director: Jamey Hampton and Ashley Roland
- Website: www.bodyvox.com

BodyVox is a dance company based in Portland, Oregon, United States, and was formed in 1997 on commission from the Portland Opera. The company blends contemporary dance with dance theater, and often makes use of other performance art form such as live music. In addition to their performances, the company has worked extensively with film and multi-media. BodyVox's collection of short films "Modern Daydreams" was a collaboration with performance artist and film maker Mitchell Rose, and the film won the American Choreography Award for Outstanding Achievement in Short Film in 2002.

== Repertory ==
- Carmina Burana – 1997 (with the Portland Opera)
- The Big Room – 1998
- A thousand little cities – 2000
- The Cunning Little Vixen - 2000 (with the Portland Opera)
- Reverie – 2001
- Zapped – 2001
- Water Bodies – 2004
- Civilization Unplugged – 2005
- Macbeth - 2006 (with the Portland Opera)
- First Impressions Series Volume 1-5 – 2001-2007
- Horizontal Leanings – 2008
- Foot Opera Files – 2009
- Chronos/Kairos - 2010
- Smoke Soup – 2010
- BloodyVox – 2010
- The Cutting Room – 2012
- The Soldier's Tale – 2012 (with Chamber Music Northwest)
- Body Opera Files -2013
- Firewall – 2014
- Cosmosis – 2015 (with the Amphion String Quartet)
- Death and Delight -2016
- Lexicon -2017
- Rain and Roses -2018
- The Pearl Dive Project -2016, 2019, 2021
- Serious Cupcakes -2021, 2022
- Pearl Dive Live -2022
- BloodyVox: Lockdown -2020, Feature film of BloodyVox
- Figments -2021, Feature film

== Personnel ==
- Jamey Hampton – Co-founder and Co-artistic Director

A Portland native, Hampton began his dance training in his hometown and furthered his study of artistic mediums at Dartmouth College, where he graduated with a BFA in drama. In 1978, Jamey joined Pilobolus dance theater; he later was an original member of MOMIX, and co-founded ISO Dance with his wife Ashley Roland. The duo founded BodyVox in 1997.

- Ashley Roland – Co-founder and Co-artistic Director

Ashley Roland is a Connecticut native and began her dance training in New York City in the David Howard and Alvin Ailey studios, continuing her studies at North Carolina School of the Arts. Ashley joined MOMIX Dance Theater as a choreographer and dancer in 1983 and four years later she cofounded ISO Dance with her husband Jamey Hampton. The duo founded BodyVox in 1997.
