= Beak 2 =

>>
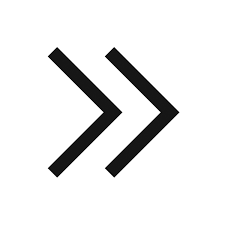

Studio album by Beak>
- Released: 2 July 2012
- Genre: Krautrock
- Length: 52:06
- Label: Invada
- Producer: Beak>

Beak> chronology
Beak> (2009)	>> (2012)	Couple in a Hole (2016)

Professional ratings
Aggregate scores
Source	Rating
Metacritic	71/100
Review scores
Source	Rating
Allmusic	4/5 stars
Consequence of Sound	C+
DIY	7/10
Drowned in Sound	7/10
Fact	4/5 discs
NME	8/10
The Observer	4/5 stars
Pitchfork Media	7.3/10
Popmatters	7/10 discs
Spin	8/10

Beak 2 (stylized >> or Beak>>) is the second studio album by the British band Beak, released on 2 July 2012.

== Track listing ==
No.	Title	Length
1.	"The Gaol"	3:09
2.	"Yatton"	5:17
3.	"Spinning Top"	6:13
4.	"Eggdog"	4:14
5.	"Liar"	2:21
6.	"Ladies' Mile"	4:44
7.	"Wulfstan II"	7:10
8.	"Elevator"	4:23
9.	"Deserters"	3:35
10.	"Kidney"	6:49
Total length:		52:06

== Personnel ==
- Matt Williams — guitars, organ, synthesizers
- Billy Fuller — bass, vocals; synthesizer (tracks 6, 8)
- Geoff Barrow — drums, vocals; synthesizer (tracks 5, 6)

== Accolades ==
Publication/Author	Country	Accolade	Year	Rank
Consequence of Sound	United States	Top 50 Albums of 2012	2012	38
The Quietus	United Kingdom	Albums of the Year 2012	2012	57
Spin	United States	50 Best Albums of 2012	2012	36
