= Himuro Yoshiteru =

Japanese electronic musician and DJ

- Also known as: Himuro
- Born: 28 November 1977 (age 47)
- Origin: Japan
- Genres: Breakbeat; Electronic music Drum and Bass; IDM; Electronica; Hip Hop
- Occupation(s): Musician; Remixer; Disc jockey Sound designer
- Instrument(s): sampler drum machine synthesizer Keyboards; Turntable; Softsynth computer laptop
- Years active: 1997 – Present
- Labels: Worm Interface; Mesk Records; Zod; Couchblip! Tangram Disk
- Website: http://www.tngrm.com

Himuro Yoshiteru is an electronic music musician and DJ from Japan.

Himuro's first album Nichiyobi was released in 1998 by the English record label Worm Interface, alongside artists like Tom Jenkinson (Squarepusher) and Freeform. His releases are mostly within the electronic music genres of drum and bass, Electronica, Hip hop and Braindance, with a significant jazz influence .

His style is often described in the media as very playful. It consists of finely chopped, fast rhythms in combination with jazzy bass and synthesizer lines and 8bit sounds (like video game music). In this area he is one of the prominent Japanese musicians of this time.

Some of his pieces have been featured on John Peel´s Radio show on BBC Radio 1 and one was later released as an mp3 on the Tribute to John Peel Series, as a free download.

In his Live Acts he uses primarily his laptop, MIDI controllers and effects processors.

== Discography ==
=== Albums ===
- (1998) Nichiyobi - (Worm Interface)
- (2004) Clear Without Items (Couchblip!)
- (2005) Mild Fantasy Violence (Zod)
- (2007) Welcome Myself (Tangram Disk)
- (2008) Here And There (File Records)
- (2010) Where Does Sound Come From? (MURDER CHANNEL)
- (2011) 7th Shape Shifting
- (2012) Our Turn, Anytime

=== EPs, singles and promos ===
- (1998) Nice Feedback E.P. - (Worm Interface)
- (1999) Himuro versus Koichi - Latest Gorgeous Energy - (Worm Interface)
- (2004) 3mcs From China
- (2005) Fuck_B_Hard
- (2007) Welcome Myself E.P. 12" (Tangram DiSk)
- (2008) Here And There E.P. 12" (Tangram Disk)
- (2008) Abcd E.P. (Invitro)

=== Remixes ===
- Shadow Huntaz feat X.A. Cute - Head In Noose (Himuro Remix)
- Borngräber & Strüver - Midsummer (Himuro Remix)
- Lambent - Drive Back Re-revised (Himuro Remix)
- Symbolic Interaction - Seasalas (Himuro Remix)
- Mrs. Tanaka - Traffic Tune (Himuro Remix)
- Mrs. Tanaka - Lime Light (Himuro Remix)
- Mrs. Tanaka - Hush Bell (Himuro Remix)
- Vukeme - 80's Dream Parasol (Himuro Remix)
- Robokoneko - Eerie Ash (Himuro Remix)
- Savage Moon (PS3 Video game) - Level 1-4 Remix

=== Compilation appearances ===
- John Peel Day - Tribute To John Peel
- Alternative Frequencies 3 - Worm Interface
- Alt. Frequencies 4 - Worm Interface
- Electric Chicken Volume One - Worm Interface
- The Beautiful Beat - Zerinnerung
- Hekla's Selection - Reckankreuzungsklankewerkzeuge

=== Videos ===
- (2005) "Tenjin" (Chillin Remix) von Kyle Griblin
- (2008) "spen za nite wiz dis sit" von Takafumi Tsuchiya
