= SoGlos =

Online magazine for Gloucestershire, England

- Editor: Michelle Fyrne
- Categories: Arts, Entertainment, Leisure
- Publisher: So Publishing Ltd
- First issue: July 2007
- Country: United Kingdom
- Language: English
- Website: http://www.soglos.com

SoGlos is an online magazine for Gloucestershire covering Cheltenham, the Cotswolds, the Forest of Dean, Gloucester, Stroud and Tewkesbury – with an editorial remit focused on arts, entertainment and leisure.

== Overview and ownership ==
The online magazine is divided into dedicated sections including Gloucestershire food, Gloucestershire theatre, Gloucestershire comedy, Gloucestershire culture, Gloucestershire music and Gloucestershire hotels, for examples – each including editorial event previews, reviews and news, hot lists, plus a directory of Gloucestershire venues.

SoGlos is owned and run by independent Cheltenham-based publishing company So Publishing Ltd. While free for users to access, the online magazine generates revenue through the sale of display advertising and native advertising.

== Background and development ==
SoGlos was officially launched in July 2007, as reported by publications and websites including The Guardian, Press Gazette, and Webuser as one of the UK's first regional online magazines written by professional journalists.

In 2008 SoGlos launched a Google Maps-powered Gloucestershire Interactive Map – a mash-up using the map provider's API and SoGlos's own directory of venue listings to plot restaurants, attractions, hotels across the county. This was reported by publications and websites including The Guardian and Google Maps Mania.

In 2009 SoGlos launched a series of Web widgets allowing webmasters to embed a calendar of Gloucestershire events, directly fed from the online magazine's listings, onto their own website. This was reported by publications and websites including journalism.co.uk, Press Gazette and HoldtheFrontPage.co.uk.

== Readership and awards ==
SoGlos is reported to have a monthly reach of 90,000+ individual readers, in addition to sending a weekly email newsletter to 28,000 subscribers.

In both 2010 and 2014, SoGlos won the title of 'Website of the Year' in the EDF Energy South West Media Awards. In 2010, SoGlos also won the title of 'Best eBusiness' in the Cheltenham Borough Council-run Business Excellence Awards.

SoGlos's YouTube channel is one of the most popular in South West England, with total upload views exceeding 10 million – thanks in part to the popularity of videos of Gloucestershire's annual cheese rolling tradition.
