= The Big Bounce (1960 film) =

1960 film

- Directed by: Jerry Fairbanks
- Written by: Robert Engel; Leo S. Rosencrans
- Produced by: Jerry Fairbanks
- Narrated by: Larry Thor
- Cinematography: Jerry Fairbanks
- Edited by: Richard Fritch
- Music by: Gene Kauer
- Production companies: Bell Laboratories; Jerry Fairbanks Productions
- Distributed by: Jerry Fairbanks Productions
- Release date: 1960
- Running time: 14 minutes
- Country: United States
- Language: English

The Big Bounce is a 1960 American film directed and written by Jerry Fairbanks. It follows Project Echo and was financed by Bell Labs.
