= Beak (band) =

English experimental electronic rock group

Beak>
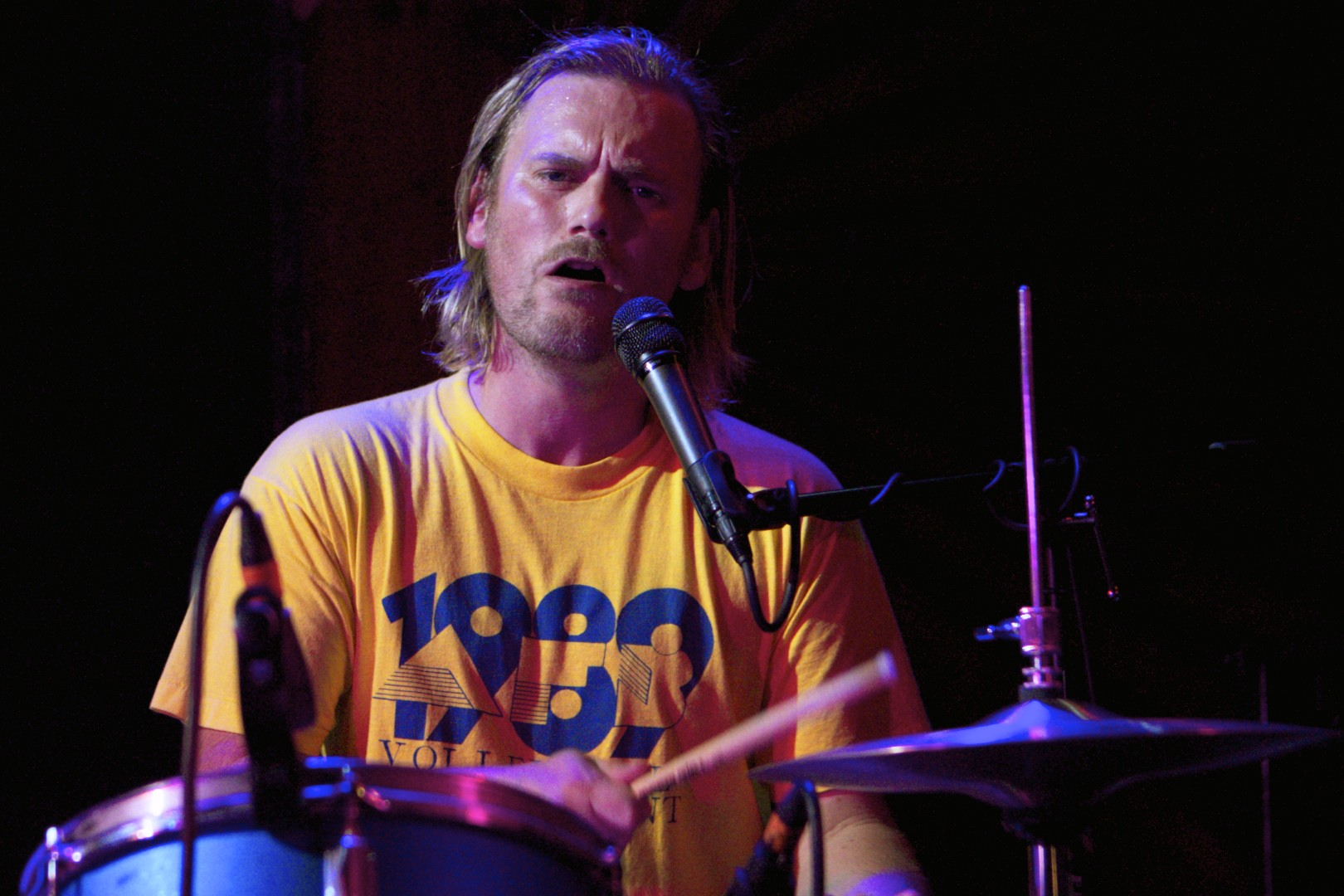
- Geoff Barrow performing with Beak> in 2010

Background information
- Origin: Bristol, England
- Genres: Electronic, experimental rock, krautrock
- Years active: 2009–present
- Labels: Invada, Ipecac, Temporary
- Members: Billy Fuller; Will Young
- Past members: Geoff Barrow; Matt Williams "Team Brick"

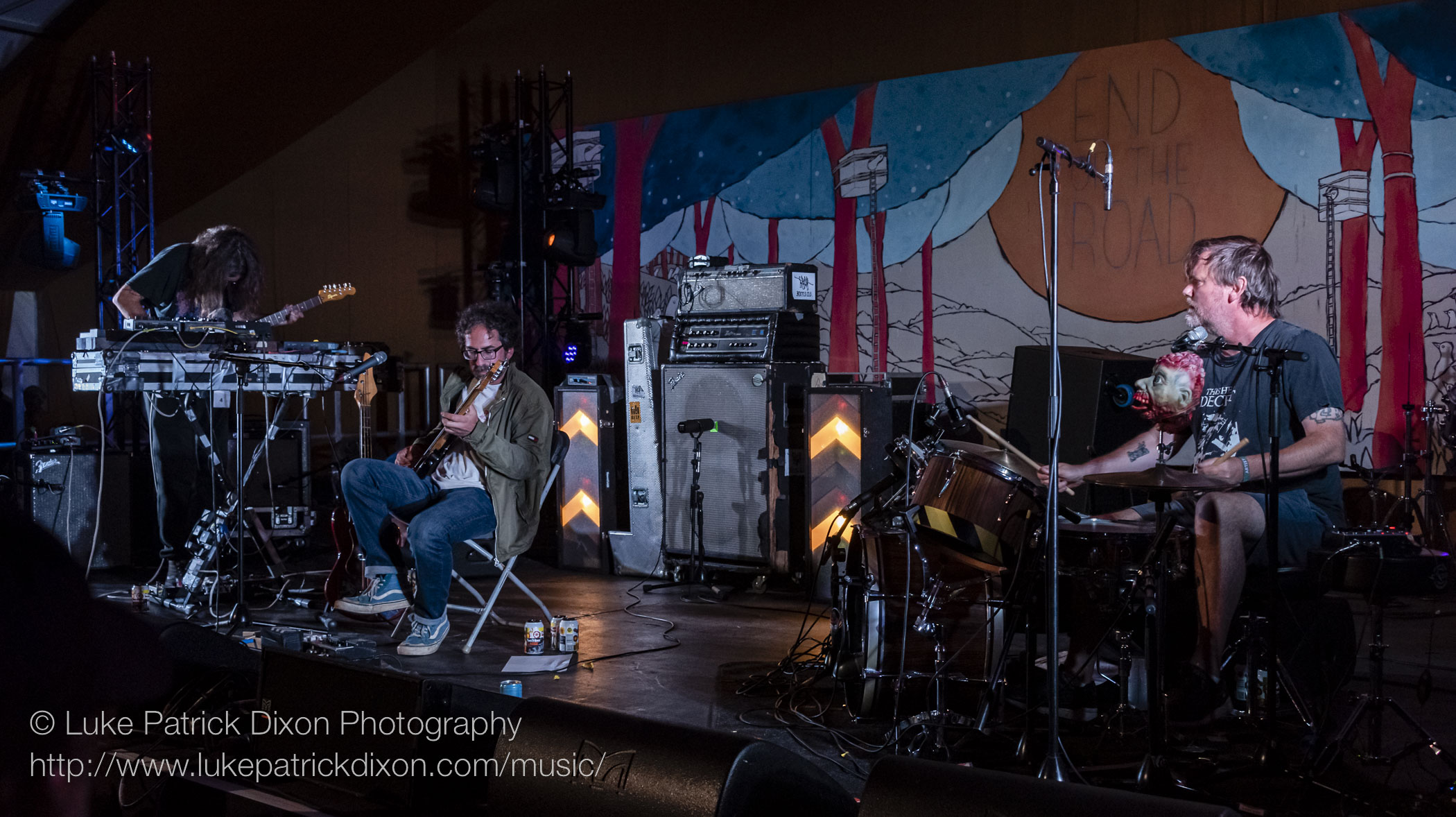
BEAK performing at End of the Road festival in 2022

Beak (stylized as Beak>) is an English experimental electronic rock music band formed in 2007. Until September 2024, the band comprised Geoff Barrow (of Portishead), Billy Fuller (of the Sensational Space Shifters) and Will Young (of Moon Gangs); Young replaced Matt Williams (MXLX, Fairhorns) in 2016. In 2024, Barrow announced his departure.

== History ==
Beak> released its self-titled debut album on 16 November 2009. The music was recorded live in one room with no overdubs or repair, only using edits to create arrangements. All tracks were written over a twelve-day session in Bristol, England. Beak> produced the debut album Anika by Anika, and co-wrote two of the album's songs in 2010.

In 2010, the band toured in the US and the UK. They performed at the ATP I'll Be Your Mirror festival, that Portishead curated in July 2011 at London's Alexandra Palace, as well as the US version of ATP's I'll Be Your Mirror in Asbury Park, New Jersey.

Beak> did the soundtrack for Tom Geens' 2015 film Couple in a Hole, drawing largely on the band's earlier material. On 27 September 2024, Barrow announced his departure from Beak to focus on other projects.

== Discography ==
- BEAK> (Ipecac Records, Invada, Temporary Residence 2009)
- >> (Invada Records, 2012)
- Couple in a Hole (2016)
- >>> (Temporary Residence, 2018)
- >>>> (Invada Records, 2024)

=== Compilations ===
- L.A. Playback (2018) – a selection of songs from various Beak releases 2012-2015
