= Thu Tran =

American actress and artist

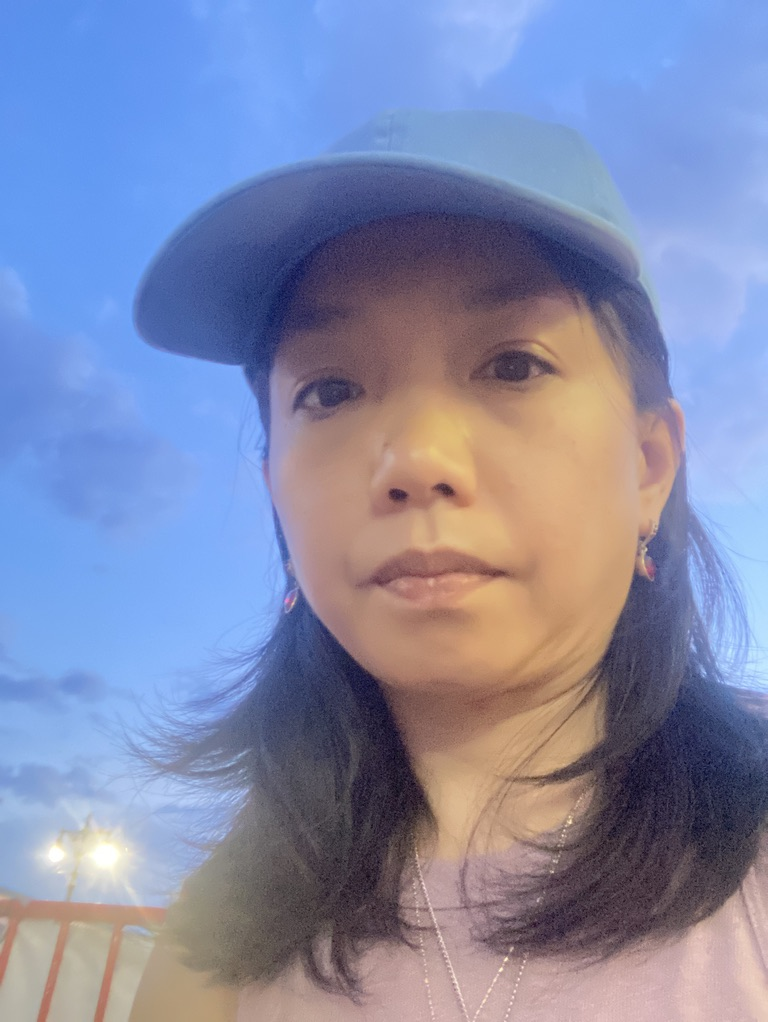
- Thu Tran at Brighton Beach 2022
- Born: Malaysia

Thu Tran is a writer and producer, known for her shows Food Party and Late Night Munchies. Much of her work is themed around food and cooking, but with a surreal spin.

== Work ==
Tran attended the Cleveland Institute of Art, where she studied glasswork. While a student, she began making installation art, often themed around food.

In 2007, Tran began creating Food Party, an experimental cooking-themed series which used homemade puppets. The project began as a web series, but in 2009 it was picked up as a show for the Independent Film Channel. Critics noted the show's surreal tone, unique props, and "lo-fi aesthetic".

In 2013, Tran began working on the web series Late Night Munchies for MTV Other. In the web series, guests would cook with Tran, creating unusual dishes together. Guests on the show included Girl Talk, Tiombe Lockhart, and Sharon Needles. Tran would later collaborate with Lockhart on a music video, and would join Girl Talk on one of their tours.

Outside of Food Party and Late Night Munchies, Tran has continued to work as an installation artist, and has collaborated with other artists on music videos, short films, and video games.

== Personal life ==
Tran is of Vietnamese descent and was raised in Cleveland, Ohio; the success of Food Party brought her to Brooklyn. She crafts many of the puppets used in her projects herself. Tran cooks extensively outside of her artistic work, and she learned to cook from her parents, who she credits both with teaching her to cook and influencing her style of humor.
