= Beak (album) =

BEAK>

Studio album by Beak>
- Released: 18 October 2009
- Recorded: 5–17 January 2009
- Studio: State Of Art Studios (Bristol, England)
- Genre: Experimental rock; gothic rock; krautrock
- Length: 1:01:04
- Label: Invada
- Producer: Beak>

Beak> chronology
| BEAK> (2009) | >> (2012) |

Beak (stylized BEAK> and also named Recordings 05/01/09 > 17/01/09) is the self-titled debut studio album by British band Beak>, released by the label Invada in October 2009. It was improvised and recorded in a twelve-day period without any overdubbing or repair. It earned generally positive reviews from critics upon release, holding an aggregate of 72 out of 100 on Metacritic.

== Production ==
Beak was written and recorded between 5–17 January 2009, improvised live without any overdubbing, at State Of Art Studios in Bristol, England. The reason for the improvised recording was that, according to member Geoff Barrow, "We’ve all played on really overdub-y records, but we felt like this wasn’t about that. We had enough of a sound between the three of us that we didn’t need to mess around with it." However, in an L.A. Record interview with the entire group, they said there was might've been one tiny overdub, and that was done through discussion.

The recording on each day would start at twelve PM, and last until six. Some songs were played ten times, while some others had two or three versions made, but usually the first take was chosen to be featured on the final product. The only tracks that were done in one take were "Backwell" and "Battery Point". Barrow said about the lyric writing, "I never wrote anything down. And what you hear is what happened in the [recording] room. Non-traditional vocals, really. I’m not a very lyrical person, and I’m definitely not a singer. I felt a little weird about it." The album was engineered by Stuart Matthews, and finally mastered by Shawn Joseph at Optimum Mastering.

== Critical reception ==
Professional ratings
Aggregate scores
| Source | Rating |
|---|---|
| Metacritic | 72/100 |
Review scores
| Source | Rating |
| Allmusic | 3.5/5 stars |
| The Daily Telegraph | 4/5 stars |
| Drowned in Sound | 9/10 |
| musicOMH | 4/5 stars |
| NME | 7/10 |
| Pitchfork Media | 6.9/10 |
| Popmatters | 6/10 discs |
| Resident Advisor | 4/5 |
| The Skinny | 3/5 stars |
| Under the Radar | 6/10 stars |

Critical reactions of Beak were generally positive, holding an aggregate score of 72 out of 100 on Metacritic, based on ten reviews. A highly favorable review came from Robert Ferguson of Drowned in Sound, who called the album "a cohesive, ambitious and thoughtfully-executed murky delight" and "A godsend of a record in these times of landfill indie". Andrew Perry of The Daily Telegraph gave it four out of five stars, writing that "Countless bands cite vintage German rock as an influence, but this lot actually sound out-there enough to justify comparison." NME's Ash Dosanjh scored it a seven out of ten, noting "a doom-like quality" of the record. With a rating of four out of five, Resident Advisor reviewer Michaelangelo Matos praised the krautrock and goth elements as "less overly beholden to any one area than it might seem." Ben Hogwood of musicOMH praised the album's variety, describing the LP as "a record that gradually gives up its secrets with each listen, in turns sombre, blissful, angry and energetic – a record of moods and their transfer to disc". Allmusic journalist Heather Phares, in her three-and-a-half star review, opined that "at their best BEAK> are fascinatingly dour, and willing to challenge listeners in unexpected ways", while BBC Music writer Adam Kennedy found it "as eccentrically Bristolian as Aphex Twin’s works are Cornish or Mogwai’s are Scottish, with equally intrepid results", noting its "constant invention and genuine humanity characterising every whirr and warm glow".

In more mixed reviews, Pitchfork Media's Jess Harvell described Beak "as full of odd, compulsive energy as you'd expect from something cranked out in two weeks, made by a guy who probably had creative fuel to burn, considering that his day job took 11 years between their second and third albums". Popmatters' Robert McCallum said the album, "can at times be a frustrating listen, but a frustrating listen that is certainly not without its fruits, and these fruits can far outweigh the frustration." Ian Crichton of The Skinny opined it as "at times a little too familiar and static to fully lose oneself in": "at first feels exciting and accomplished, until the absolute adherence to well-worn formulas of taut motorik beats, Can basslines and ghost train organ drones begin to dull the edge." Under the Radar writer Nick Hyman called the sounds "frequently surprising and refreshing to hear what comes around the dark corners created here", although felt the experimental nature went too far at some points of the LP.

== Track listing ==
All tracks are written by Beak>.

| No. | Title | Length |
|---|---|---|
| 1. | "Backwell" | 6:15 |
| 2. | "Pill" | 5:34 |
| 3. | "Ham Green" | 6:27 |
| 4. | "I Know" | 5:02 |
| 5. | "Battery Point" | 7:10 |
| 6. | "Iron Acton" | 5:00 |
| 7. | "Ears Have Ears" | 4:23 |
| 8. | "Blagdon Lake" | 4:44 |
| 9. | "Barrow Gurney" | 2:01 |
| 10. | "The Cornubia" | 4:00 |
| 11. | "Dundry Hill" | 7:38 |
| 12. | "Flax Bourton" | 2:50 |
| Total length: | | 1:01:04 |

== Personnel ==
Credits are adapted from liner notes. Locations

- Recorded and engineered at State Of Art Studios in Bristol, England
- Mastered at Optimum Mastering in Bristol, England

Personnel

- Songwriting, performance, production – Beak
- Engineering – Stuart Matthews
- Mastering – Shawn Joseph
- Artwork – Johnny O
- Artwork logo – John Minton
