= Ledol =

Chemical compound

Names
- IUPAC name 6β,11-Cyclo-1β,4α,5β-guaian-10α-ol
- Systematic IUPAC name (1aR,4R,4aS,7R,7aS,7bS)-1,1,4,7-Tetramethyldecahydro-1H-cyclopropa[e]azulen-4-ol

Identifiers
CAS Number	577-27-5
3D model (JSmol)	Interactive image
ChemSpider	83783
PubChem CID	92812
UNII	99XJ3YS21U
CompTox Dashboard (EPA)	DTXSID40877915
- InChI: InChI=1S/C15H26O/c1-9-5-6-10-12(9)13-11(14(13,2)3)7-8-15(10,4)16/h9-13,16H,5-8H2,1-4H3/t9-,10+,11-,12-,13-,15-/m1/s1 Key: AYXPYQRXGNDJFU-AOWZIMASSA-N; InChI=1/C15H26O/c1-9-5-6-10-12(9)13-11(14(13,2)3)7-8-15(10,4)16/h9-13,16H,5-8H2,1-4H3/t9-,10+,11-,12-,13-,15-/m1/s1 Key: AYXPYQRXGNDJFU-AOWZIMASBF
- SMILES: C[C@@H]1CC[C@H]2[C@@H]1[C@H]3[C@H](C3(C)C)CC[C@@]2(C)O

Properties
Chemical formula	C_{15}H_{26}O
Molar mass	222.372 g·mol^{−1}
- Except where otherwise noted, data are given for materials in their standard state (at 25 °C [77 °F], 100 kPa). Infobox references

Ledol is a poisonous sesquiterpene that can cause cramps, paralysis, and delirium. Caucasian peasants used Rhododendron plants for these effects in shamanistic rituals. Ledol resides in the essential oils of certain plants and when crushed, these oils are released. One of the plants with the highest concentration of these essential oils is Rhododendron tomentosum.

The word "ledol" comes from the Greek word "ledos" meaning "robe". This likely comes from the "wooly" appearance of the plant, which has hair-like stalks stemming from the flower.

== Historical and traditional uses ==
The earliest known written record of Rhododendron plant toxicity dates back to 401 B.C. in China. Despite their toxicity, Rhododendron species have been documented in traditional medicinal practices across various cultures, including Chinese, Ayurvedic, European, and North American practices.

The accounts of Rhododendron from around the world describe numerous health benefits and treatments to various ailments.

R. tomentosum is highly recorded with various uses, like treating rheumatism, coughs, colds, and insect bites. Some common names it has are "wild rosemary", "marsh tea", and "marsh rosemary". Scientists have studied R. tomentosum's shoots, due to the shoots having the highest concentration of essential oils, for potential antidiabetic, antimicrobial, and antioxidant purposes.

== Mechanism of action ==
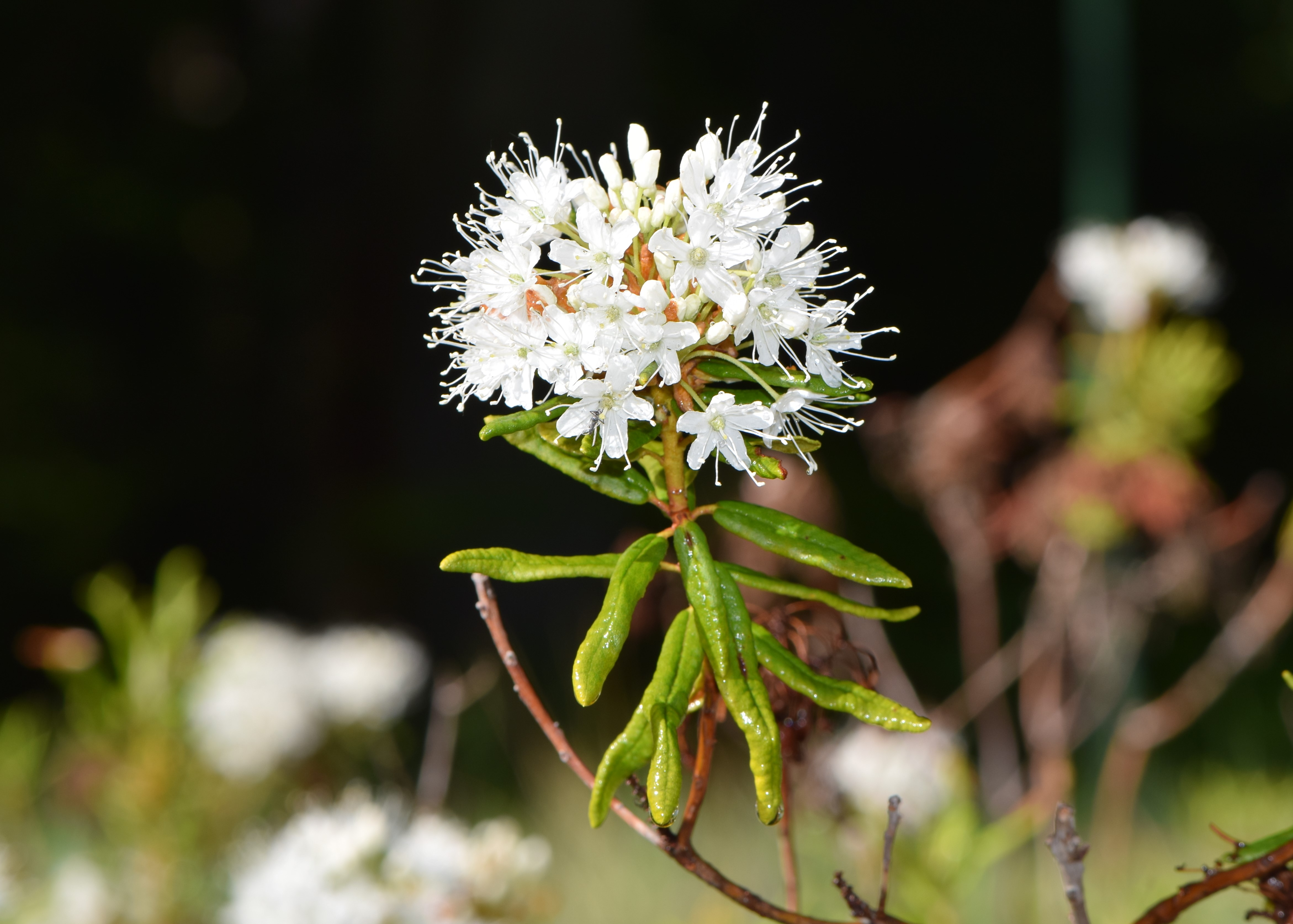
An image of Rhododendron tomentosum flowers, hair-like fibers stem from the flower, which inspired the name of the toxic molecule within its essential oils.

Although the ledol mechanism of action is quite under-studied, ledol is a sesquiterpenoid and studies on similar sesquiterpenoids, such as picrotoxinin, have shown that these molecules often target GABA receptors. These sesquiterpenoids act as GABA antagonists on GABA post-synaptic receptors. GABA-A receptors, in particular, function as chloride channels that facilitate the flow of chloride ions across cell membranes.

When GABA is deficient, symptoms can include respiratory difficulty, seizures, delirium, vomiting, nausea, gastrointestinal issues, headaches, increased blood pressure, and muscle cramps. This pattern reflects how known GABA-A receptor antagonists, such as picrotoxinin, affect the body. Ledol has similar—if not identical—effects in the body, albeit milder than those of known GABA-A antagonists, according to sources.

Another sesquiterpenoid, Nootkatone, was proven to exhibit similar effects in insects.

== Metabolism ==
Even though the metabolism of ledol has yet to be elucidated, a 2023 article involving sesquiterpene lactones, such as parthenolide, showed the sesquiterpenes reacting to human liver microsomes. This demonstrates the reactivity with the liver's CYP3A4 enzyme. Through relation, the metabolism is possibly facilitated through the liver if ingested.

== Sources ==
Ledol is found in labrador tea, an herbal tea (not a true tea) made from three closely related species:

- Rhododendron tomentosum – Northern Labrador tea, previously Ledum palustre
- Rhododendron groenlandicum – Bog Labrador tea, previously Ledum groenlandicum or Ledum latifolium
- Rhododendron columbianum – Western Labrador tea, or trapper's tea, previously Ledum glandulosum

Ledol is also found in the essential oil of priprioca at a concentration of around 4%.

Ledol is also found to varying concentrations in the following plants:

- Cistus ladaniferus
- Corymbia maculata
- Eucalyptus albens
- Eucalyptus astringens
- Eucalyptus blakelyi
- Eucalyptus bosistoana
- Eucalyptus botryoides
- Eucalyptus camaldulensis
- Eucalyptus citriodora
- Eucalyptus cladocalyx
- Eucalyptus dealbata
- Eucalyptus diversicolor
- Eucalyptus globulus
- Eucalyptus maidenii
- Eucalyptus melliodora
- Eucalyptus moluccana
- Eucalyptus nova-anglica
- Eucalyptus occidentalis
- Eucalyptus oviformis
- Eucalyptus paniculata
- Eucalyptus polyanthemos
- Eucalyptus punctata
- Eucalyptus saligna
- Eucalyptus siderophloia
- Eucalyptus sideroxylon
- Eucalyptus tereticornis
- Humulus lupulus
- Hyssopus officinalis
- Mentha × piperita
- Panax quinquefolius
- Peumus boldus
- Pimenta dioica
- Piper cubeba
- Salvia officinalis
- Satureja obovata
- Syzygium aromaticum
- Teucrium arduini
- Teucrium gnaphalodes
- Teucrium polium
- Valeriana officinalis
- Vitex agnus-castus
