= Marsh rosemary =

Marsh rosemary may refer to:

- Limonium, a genus of 120 flower species also referred to as sea lavender or statice
- Rhododendron tomentosum, a flowering plant also known as Marsh Labrador tea, northern Labrador tea or wild rosemary
