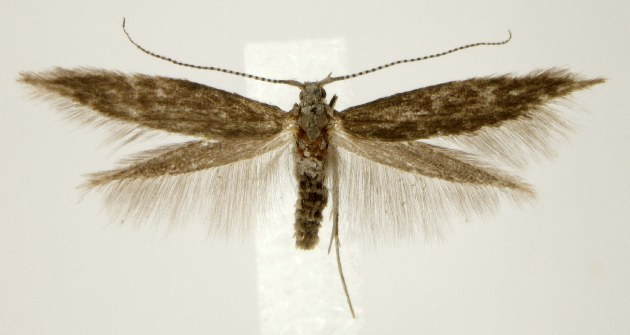

Scientific classification
- Kingdom: Animalia
- Phylum: Arthropoda
- Clade: Pancrustacea
- Class: Insecta
- Order: Lepidoptera
- Family: Coleophoridae
- Genus: Coleophora
- Species: C. affiliatella

Binomial name
- Coleophora affiliatella McDunnough, 1945

= Coleophora affiliatella =

Species of moth

Coleophora affiliatella is a species of moth in the family Coleophoridae. It is found in Canada, including Nova Scotia.

The larvae feed on the leaves of Ledum and Rhododendron species. They create a spatulate leaf case.
