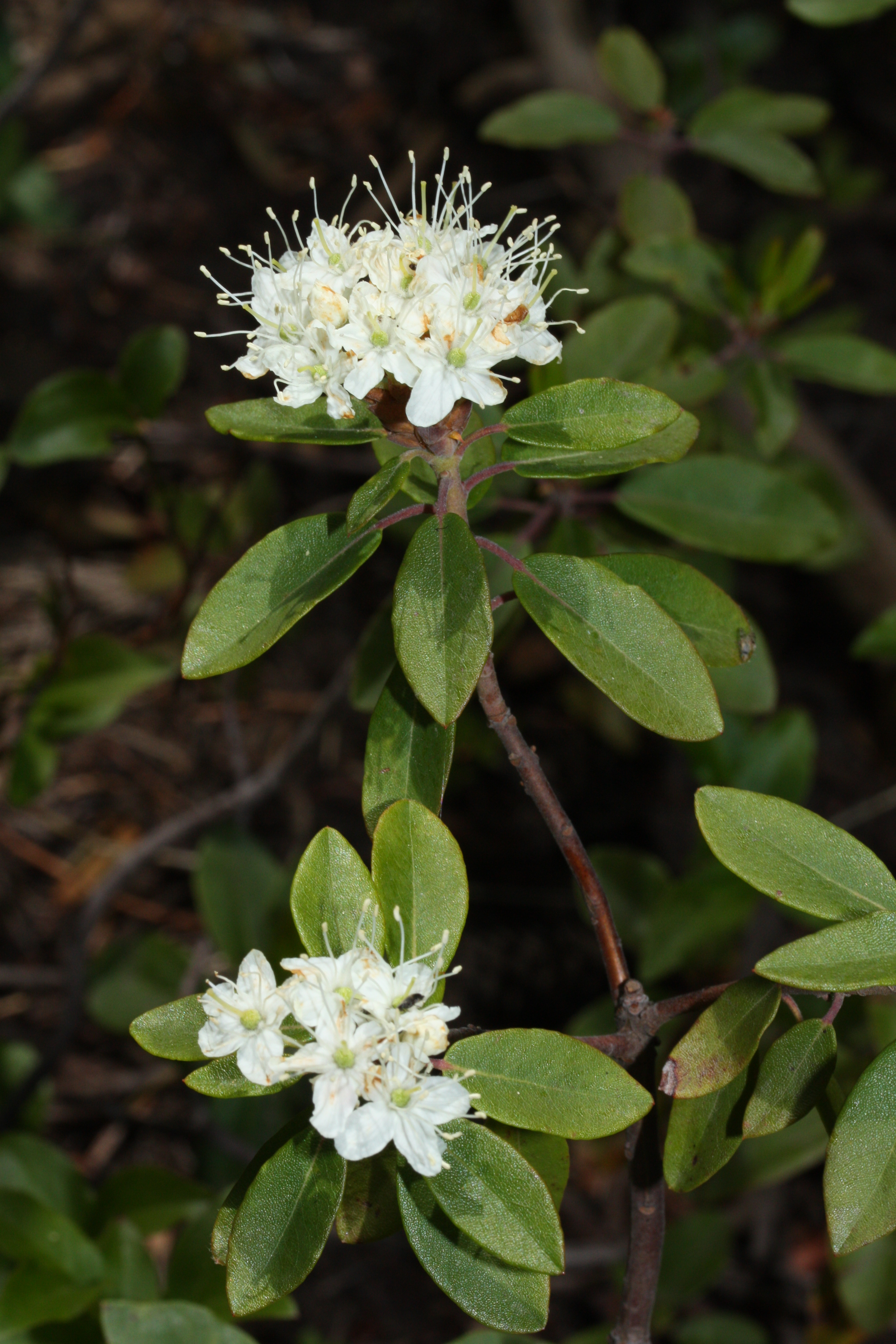
- Rhododendron columbianum (Ledum glandulosum)

Scientific classification
- Kingdom: Plantae
- Clade: Tracheophytes
- Clade: Angiosperms
- Clade: Eudicots
- Clade: Asterids
- Order: Ericales
- Family: Ericaceae
- Genus: Rhododendron
- Subgenus: Rhododendron subg. Rhododendron
- Section: Rhododendron sect. Rhododendron
- Subsection: R. subsect. Ledum (L.) Kron & Judd

Species
- See text

= Rhododendron subsect. Ledum =

Subsection of genus Rhododendron

Ledum was a genus in the family Ericaceae, including eight species of evergreen shrub native to cool temperate and subarctic regions of the Northern Hemisphere and commonly known as Labrador tea. It is now recognised as a subsection of section Rhododendron, subgenus Rhododendron, of the genus Rhododendron.

== Description ==
Ledum species often grow together with poisonous plants such as bog-laurel and bog-rosemary, but certain species (e.g. L. groenlandicum and L. palustre) are easily distinguished by the distinctive rust coloured fuzz on the bottom of leaves.

== Taxonomy ==
=== Reclassification into Rhododendron ===
Recent genetic evidence has shown that the species previously treated in this genus are correctly placed in the genus Rhododendron, where they are now treated as Rhododendron subsect. Ledum. Because some of the species names used in Ledum could not be used in Rhododendron (the names already having been used for other species already in this large genus), new names had to be coined for them.

=== Species ===
The species listed in genus Ledum (accepted and synonyms), with their current accepted names are:

| Ledum species | Author | GBIF status | TPL status | GBIF Accepted species | Author | GBIF status | TPL Accepted species | Author | TPL status |
|---|---|---|---|---|---|---|---|---|---|
| Ledum | L. | Accepted | | | | | | | |
| Ledum angustifolium | Hort. ex Lavallée | Accepted | | | | | | | |
| Ledum buxifolium | Bergius | | Synonym (Note: TPL Reference: group=Ledum name=tro-50176889 Coming soon) | | | | Kalmia buxifolia | (Bergius) Gift & Kron | Accepted (Note: TPL Reference: group=Kalmia name=tro-50310693 Coming soon) |
| Ledum californicum | Kellogg | | Synonym (Note: TPL Reference: group=Ledum name=tro-50092423 Coming soon) | | | | Ledum glandulosum | | Accepted (Note: TPL Reference: group=Ledum name=tro-12300614 Coming soon) |
| Ledum columbianum | Piper | Synonym | Accepted (Note: TPL Reference: group=Ledum name=tro-12300613 Coming soon) | Rhododendron columbianum | (Piper) Harmaja | Accepted | | | |
| Ledum decumbens | (Ait.) Lodd. | Synonym | | Rhododendron tomentosum subsp. decumbens | (Aiton) Elven & D.F.Murray | Accepted | | | |
| Ledum decumbens | (Ait.) Lodd. ex Steud. | Synonym | Synonym (Note: TPL Reference: group=Ledum name=kew-2349911 Coming soon) | Rhododendron tomentosum subsp. decumbens | (Aiton) Elven & D.F.Murray | Accepted | Ledum palustre subsp. decumbens | | Accepted (Note: TPL Reference: group=Ledum name=kew-2355735 Coming soon) |
| Ledum decumbens | Small | Accepted | Accepted (Note: TPL Reference: group=Ledum name=tro-12300073 Coming soon) | | | | | | |
| Ledum glandulosum | Nutt. | Synonym | Accepted | Rhododendron neoglandulosum | Harmaja | Accepted | | | |
| Ledum glandulosum subsp. glandulosum | | | Synonym (Note: TPL Reference: group=Ledum name=tro-12302631 Coming soon) | | | | Ledum glandulosum | | Accepted |
| Ledum glandulosum var. californicum | (Kellogg) C.L.Hitchc. | | Synonym (Note: TPL Reference: group=Ledum name=tro-12300615 Coming soon) | | | | Ledum glandulosum | | Accepted |
| Ledum glandulosum var. glandulosum | | | Synonym (Note: TPL Reference: group=Ledum name=tro-12302504 Coming soon) | | | | Ledum glandulosum | | Accepted |
| Ledum groenlandicum | Oeder | Synonym | Synonym (Note: TPL Reference: group=Ledum name=kew-2349909 Coming soon) | Rhododendron groenlandicum | (Oeder) K.A.Kron & W.S.Judd | Accepted | Ledum palustre subsp. groenlandicum | | Accepted (Note: TPL Reference: group=Ledum name=kew-2355734 Coming soon) |
| Ledum groenlandicum | Retz. | Accepted | | | | | | | |
| Ledum groenlandicum f. denudatum | Vict. & J.Rousseau | Accepted | | | | | | | |
| Ledum groenlandicum subsp. glandulosum | (Nutt.) Á.Löve & D.Löve | Synonym | Synonym (Note: TPL Reference: group=Ledum name=tro-50298977 Coming soon) | Rhododendron neoglandulosum | Harmaja | Accepted | Ledum glandulosum | | Accepted |
| Ledum groenlandicum var. aridiphilum | D.Löve | Accepted | | | | | | | |
| Ledum hypoleucum | Kom. | Synonym | Synonym (Note: TPL Reference: group=Ledum name=tro-12303119 Coming soon) | Rhododendron diversipilosum | (Nakai) H.Harmaja | Accepted | Rhododendron hypoleucum | (Kom.) Harmaja | Accepted (Note: TPL Reference: group=Rhody name=tro-50303827 Coming soon) |
| Ledum idahoensis | | Accepted | | | | | | | |
| Ledum macrophyllum | Tolm. | Synonym | Accepted (Note: TPL Reference: group=Ledum name=tro-12300074 Coming soon) | Rhododendron diversipilosum | (Nakai) H.Harmaja | Accepted | | | |
| Ledum maximum | (Nakai) A.P.Khokhr. & M.T.Mazurenko | Synonym | Accepted (Note: TPL Reference: group=Ledum name=tro-50194624 Coming soon) | Rhododendron tomentosum | Harmaja | Accepted | | | |
| Ledum palustre | L. | Synonym | Accepted (Note: TPL Reference: group=Ledum name=kew-2349893 Coming soon) | Rhododendron tomentosum | Harmaja | Accepted | | | |
| Ledum palustre | Michx. | Synonym | | Rhododendron groenlandicum | (Oeder) K.A.Kron & W.S.Judd | Accepted | | | |
| Ledum palustre f. decumbens | (Aiton) Y.L.Chou & S.L.Tung | | Synonym (Note: TPL Reference: group=Ledum name=tro-50156076 Coming soon) | | | | Ledum palustre subsp. decumbens | | Accepted |
| Ledum palustre subsp. angustissimum | Worosch. | Synonym | | Rhododendron subulatum | (Nakai) Harmaja | Accepted | | | |
| Ledum palustre subsp. decumbens | (Aiton) Hultén | | Accepted | | | | | | |
| Ledum palustre subsp. diversipilosum | Hara | | Synonym (Note: TPL Reference: group=Ledum name=tro-12303120 Coming soon) | | | | Ledum macrophyllum | | Accepted |
| Ledum palustre subsp. groenlandicum | (Oeder) Hultén | Synonym | Accepted | Rhododendron groenlandicum | (Oeder) K.A.Kron & W.S.Judd | Accepted | | | |
| Ledum palustre var. angustifolium | Hook. | Accepted (Note: This is an inconsistency in GBIF data: the species name is a "Synonym" but a variety is "Accepted".) | | | | | | | |
| Ledum palustre var. angustum | E.A.Busch | | Synonym (Note: TPL Reference: group=Ledum name=tro-50156075 Coming soon) | | | | Ledum palustre | | Accepted |
| Ledum palustre var. decumbens | Aiton | | Synonym (Note: TPL Reference: group=Ledum name=kew-2355732 Coming soon) | | | | Ledum palustre subsp. decumbens | | Accepted |
| Ledum palustre var. diversipilosum | Nakai | Synonym | Synonym (Note: TPL Reference: group=Ledum name=tro-12303121 Coming soon) | Rhododendron diversipilosum | (Nakai) H.Harmaja | Accepted | Ledum macrophyllum | | Accepted |
| Ledum palustre var. latifolium | (Jacq.) Hook. | Synonym | | Rhododendron groenlandicum | (Oeder) K.A.Kron & W.S.Judd | Accepted | | | |
| Ledum palustre var. latifolium | (Jacq.) Michx. | Synonym | | Rhododendron groenlandicum | (Oeder) K.A.Kron & W.S.Judd | Accepted | | | |
| Ledum palustre var. maximum | Nakai | | Synonym (Note: TPL Reference: group=Ledum name=tro-50194625 Coming soon) | | | | Ledum maximum | | Accepted |
| Ledum palustre var. palustre | | | Synonym (Note: TPL Reference: group=Ledum name=tro-50156073 Coming soon) | | | | Ledum palustre | | Accepted |
| Ledum palustre var. subulatum | Nakai | | Synonym (Note: TPL Reference: group=Ledum name=tro-50194628 Coming soon) | | | | Rhododendron subulatum | (Nakai) Harmaja | Accepted (Note: TPL Reference: group=Rhody name=tro-50223463 Coming soon) |
| Ledum serpyllifolium | | Accepted | | | | | | | |
| Ledum subulatum | (Nakai) A.P.Khokhr. & M.T.Mazurenko | Synonym | Synonym (Note: TPL Reference: group=Ledum name=tro-50194629 Coming soon) | Rhododendron subulatum | (Nakai) Harmaja | Accepted | Rhododendron subulatum | (Nakai) Harmaja | Accepted |

==== Species references ====
Ledum

Rhododendron

Other

=== Hybrids ===
Natural hybrids (nothospecies) also occur.

- Ledum columbianum = Rhododendron × columbianum (R. groenlandicum × R. neoglandulosum) is listed by Harri Harmaja as a natural hybrid.
- Rhododendron vanhoeffeni Abromeit is a probably hybrid between Ledum palustre subsp. decumbens and Rhododendron lapponicum.

== Uses ==
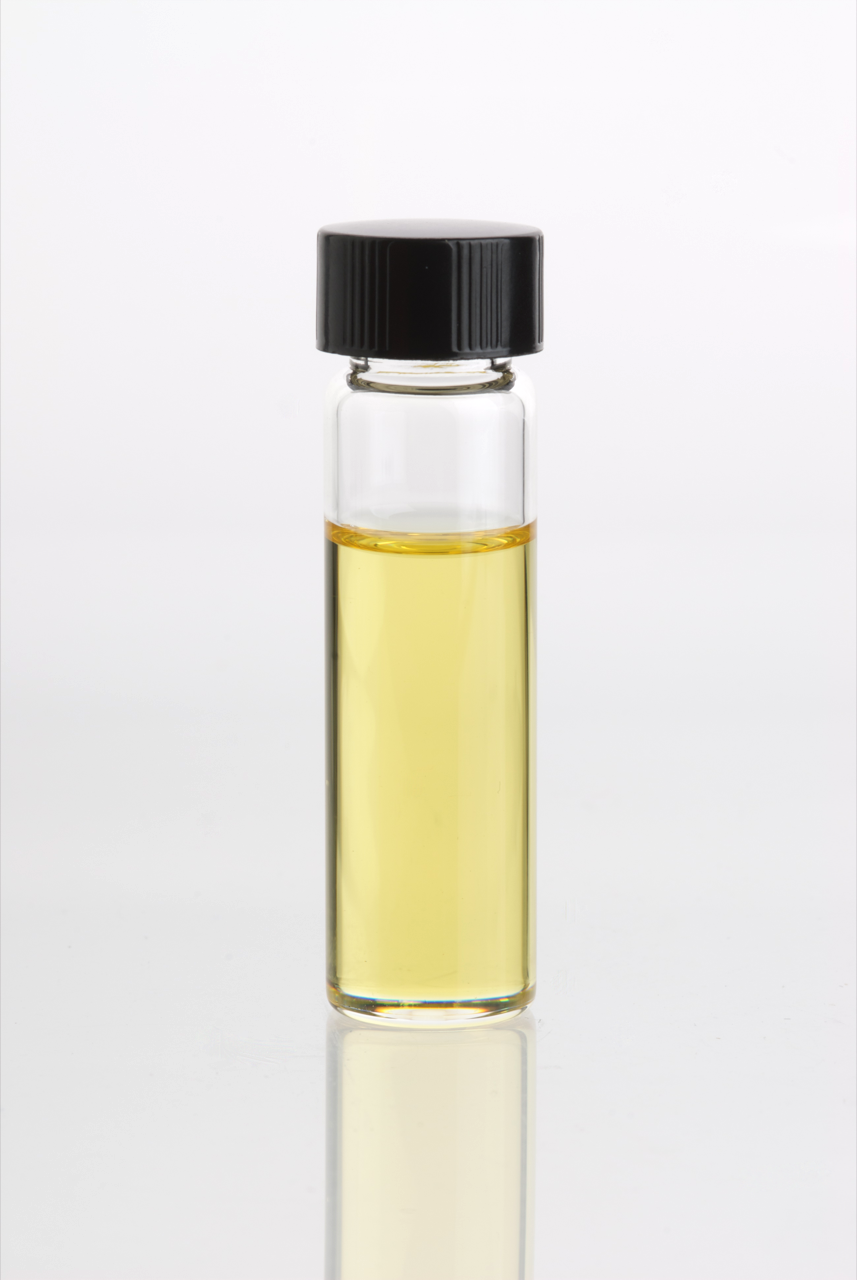
Ledum (L. groenlandicum) essential oil in clear glass vial

Some species (e.g. L. groenlandicum) have been used to produce Labrador tea. Other species have varying levels of toxicity (e.g. L. glandulosum). Evergreen Labrador tea grows slowly, but retains its leaves year-round. Users should take care not to over-harvest leaves from any single plant.

== See also ==
- List of sections in subgenus Rhododendron

== Bibliography ==
- Judd, Walter S. & Kron, Kathleen A. (2009). "Rhododendron Linnaeus, Sp. Pl. 1: 392. 1753; Gen. Pl. ed. 5, 185. 1754". Flora of North America. Vol. 8.
- Kron, Kathleen A. & Judd, Walter S. (1990). "Phylogenetic Relationships within the Rhodoreae (Ericaceae) with Specific Comments on the Placement of Ledum". Systematic Botany. 15 (1): 57–68. Bibcode:1990SysBo..15...57K. doi:10.2307/2419016. ISSN 0363-6445. JSTOR 2419016.
- Harmaja, Harri (1990). "New names and nomenclatural combinations in Rhododendron (Ericaceae)". Ann. Bot. Fennici. 27 (2): 203–204. JSTOR 23725435.
- Harmaja, Harri (1991). "Taxonomic notes on Rhododendron subsection Ledum (Ledum, Ericaceae), with a key to its species". Ann. Bot. Fennici. 28 (2): 171–173. JSTOR 23725406.
- Harmaja, Harri (1999). "Rhododendron diversipilosum, comb. nov. (Ericaceae)" (PDF). Ann. Bot. Fennici. 35: 263–264.
- Harmaja, Harri (2002). "Rhododendron subulatum, comb. nova (Ericaceae)" (PDF). Ann. Bot. Fennici. 39: 183–184.
- Kihlman, Bengt A. (2004). "Hybrids Between Ledums and Lepidote Rhododendrons". Journal of the American Rhododendron Society. 58 (2): 74–81.
