= Labrador tea =

Tea made from three related plant species

Labrador tea is a common name for three closely related evergreen shrubs in the genus Rhododendron as well as a herbal tea traditionally made from their leaves. All three species belong to the heath family (Ericaceae) and are plants of the subarctic and boreal wetlands. Labrador tea has been used for centuries as a medicinal beverage for a long time among the Dene and Inuit, Athabaskan, and other Indigenous cultures of North America.

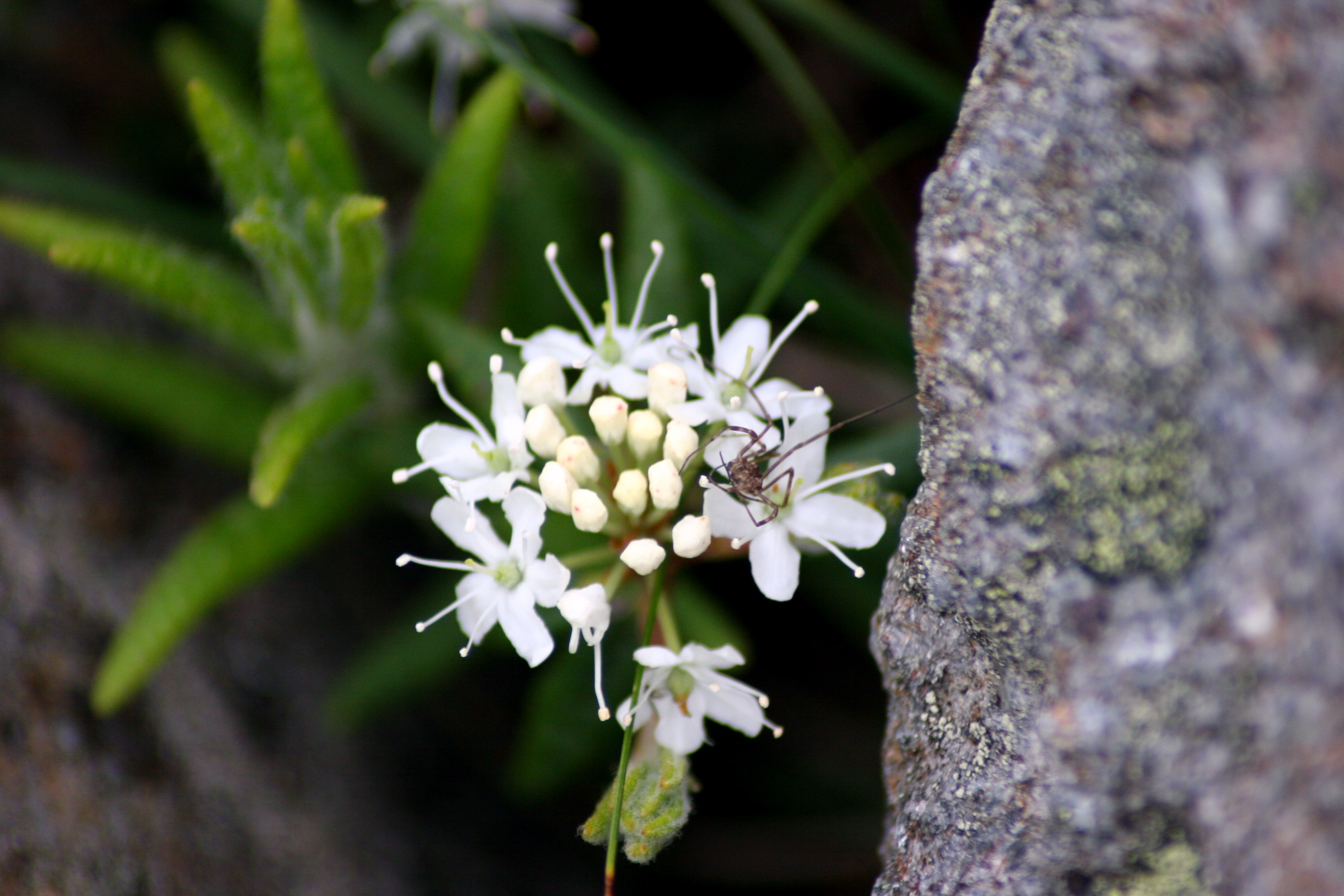
Close-up of a Labrador tea flower, found in the alpine zone of northern New Hampshire

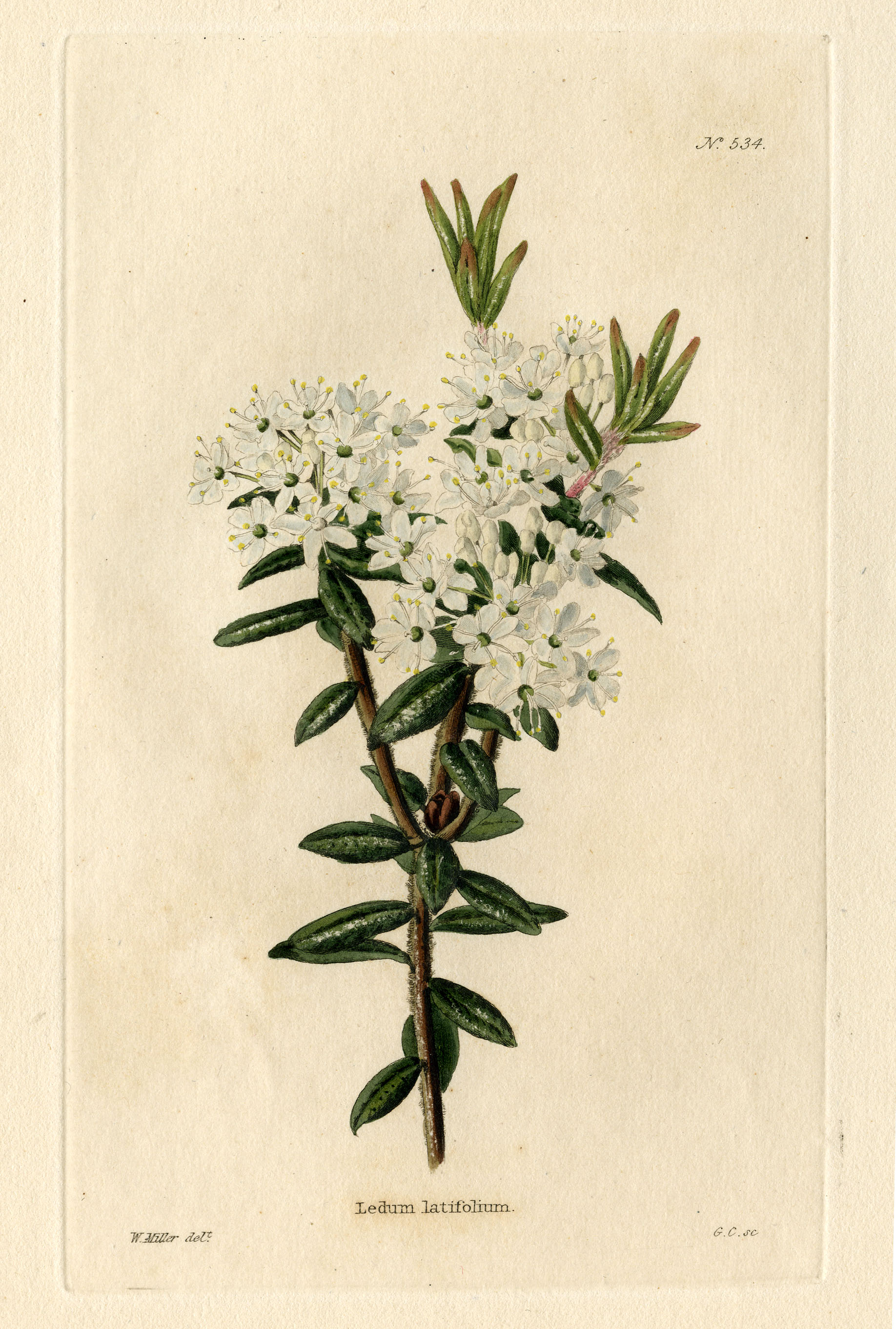
Ledum latifolium, an earlier name for Rhododendron groenlandicum

== Description ==
All three species used to make Labrador tea are low, slow-growing shrubs with evergreen leaves:

- Rhododendron tomentosum (northern Labrador tea, previously Ledum palustre),
- Rhododendron groenlandicum, (bog Labrador tea, previously Ledum groenlandicum or Ledum latifolium) and
- Rhododendron columbianum, (western Labrador tea, or trapper's tea, previously Ledum glandulosum or Ledum columbianum).

Rhododendron groenlandicum is the current scientific name according to ITIS. Based on phylogenetic evidence, Ledum was subsumed into Rhododendron, becoming a section or subsection of that genus. The leaves of R. groenlandicum range from 2 to 6 centimeters. The upper side of the leaves have a thick waxy cuticle, while the lower surface is covered in dense white hair that turns rust-colored with age.

=== Flowers ===
The flowers of R. groenlandicum are small, white, and perfect (bisexual). Their clusters have up to 35 flowers with petals approximately 1 cm long. With 5 oval shaped petals it produces a sweet aroma and sticky nectar to attract pollinators.

== Pollinators ==
R. groenlandicum is self-compatible; however, self-fertilization results in lower fruit set and fewer seeds per fruit. Pollination is primarily by bees; however, butterflies and beetles can also perform pollination.

Its roots occur in the moss layer which is roughly 45 cm deep. On its fine hair roots it forms mycorrhizal associations. These help the plant acquire nitrogen and phosphorus from the soil by breaking down its organic form to improve drought tolerance and pathogen resistance.

== Habitat ==
Labrador tea species grows primarily in bogs, wetlands, cold, acidic, nutrient-poor environments.

R. tomentosum, R. groenlandicum, and R. neoglandulosum can be found in wetlands and peat bogs.

== Uses ==
The Athabaskans and other indigenous peoples brew the leaves as a beverage. The Pomo, Kashaya, Tolowa and Yurok have used the leaves of Labrador tea as a medicinal herbal tea especially for coughs and colds. Botanical extracts from the leaves have been used to create natural skin care products by companies in Quebec and Newfoundland and Labrador. Others use Labrador tea to spice meat by boiling the leaves and branches in water and then soaking the meat in the decoction.

During the eighteenth century, German brewers used R. tomentosum while brewing beer to make it more intoxicating, but it became forbidden because it was thought to have led to increased aggression.

== Toxicology ==
Primary toxins:

- Ledol
- Grayanotoxins

Labrador tea contains several toxic compounds making it unsafe to consume, as toxicity varies across species and localities. Excessive consumption is not recommended due to diuresis, vomiting, dizziness, and drowsiness. Large doses can lead to cramps, convulsions, paralysis, and, in rare cases, death.

Toxicity occurs due to the terpenoid ledol which is found in all Labrador tea species. R. groenlandicum has the lowest toxicity due to lower levels of ledol. Moderately narcotic grayanotoxins are also present, but few lethal human cases of poisoning solely due to grayanotoxins have been documented. However, lethal poisonings have been documented in livestock.

== Harvesting ==
Due to the plant's slow growth, leaves are collected only in the spring by taking one new leaf from an individual plant to avoid damaging the plant.

== See also ==
- Labrador tea doll
