= Anna Meredith =

Musical artist and composer (born 1978)

Anna Meredith MBE
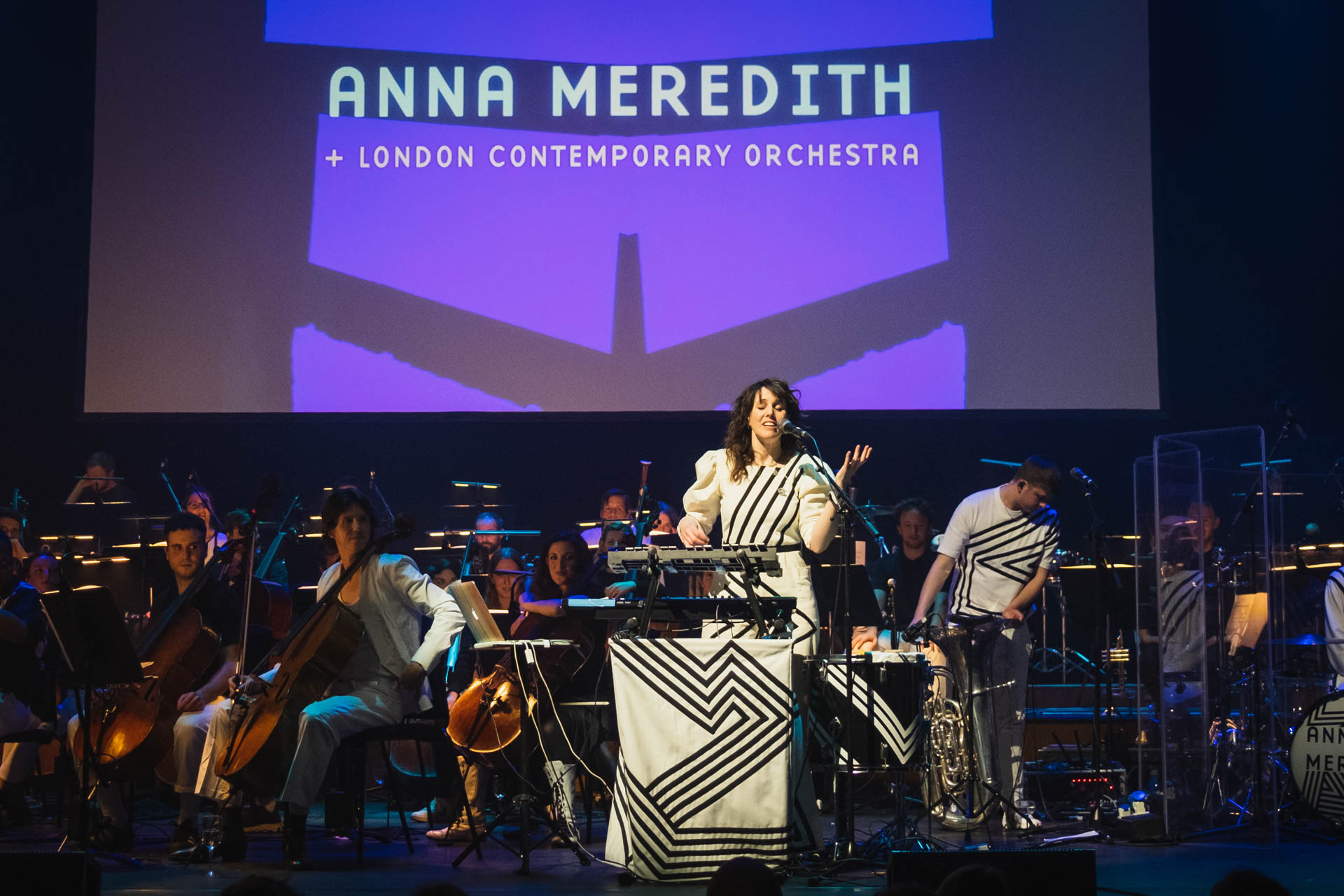
- Meredith at the Barbican Centre in 2022

Background information
- Born: 12 January 1978 (age 48); Tufnell Park, north London, England
- Genres: Modern classical; experimental
- Occupations: Composer and musical performer
- Years active: 2008–present
- Labels: Moshi Moshi; Mercury KX/Decca/Universal Classics
- Website: annameredith.com

Anna Howard Meredith MBE (born 12 January 1978) is a Scottish composer and performer of electronic and acoustic music. She is a former composer-in-residence with the BBC Scottish Symphony Orchestra and former PRS/RPS Composer in the House with Sinfonia ViVA.

In 2016, Meredith released her debut studio album, Varmints, to widespread critical acclaim. An electronica-based release, the album won the 2016 Scottish Album of the Year Award.

== Early life and education ==
Meredith was born in Tufnell Park, north London, England, and moved to South Queensferry, Scotland, at the age of two. She read for a degree in music at the University of York, where she was awarded first-class honours, and gained her master's degree from the Royal College of Music. In 2003, aged 24, she was made the Constant and Kit Lambert junior fellow of the Royal College of Music.

== Career ==
Meredith first came to widespread public attention through her work froms, created for the 2008 BBC Last Night of the Proms, which was broadcast to 40 million people. She has since written another BBC Prom commission, her first opera (Tarantula in Petrol Blue – with libretto by Philip Ridley) and collaborated with the beatboxer Shlomo, writing the Concerto for Beatboxer and Orchestra. Meredith has been a judge for BBC Young Musician of the Year, a mentor to Goldie for the TV show Classical Goldie and is a frequent guest and commentator for the BBC Proms and other BBC Radio 3 and Radio 4 shows.

She was the classical music nominee for the 2009 Times Breakthrough Award and won the 2010 Paul Hamlyn Foundation Award for Composers.

Meredith's pieces include Four Tributes to 4am for orchestra, electronics and visuals by (her sister) Eleanor Meredith, and HandsFree, a PRS NewMusic20x12 Commission for the National Youth Orchestra, which received warm reviews after being performed as part of the 2012 Cultural Olympiad in the Philharmonic Hall, Liverpool.

Meredith has moved into electronic music, which she has performed throughout Europe alongside a diverse range of artists including supporting These New Puritans in Berlin, James Blake, Seb Rochford and Max de Wardener at Ether 2011 and a solo set at La Carrière de Normandoux. In 2012 Meredith released her debut EP Black Prince Fury, on Moshi Moshi Records, which a reviewer compared favourably to the work of the avant-garde jazz composer Moondog. In August 2013, Moshi Moshi Records and VF Editions released Meredith's second EP, Jet Black Raider. In an interview with Pitchfork, Meredith noted that her second EP featured "clarinets, singing, glocks, drums, lots of cello," unlike Black Prince Fury, which was entirely synthesised.

Meredith's debut album, entitled Varmints, was released in March 2016.

She featured in the First Night of the 2018 Proms with a new collaboration, Five Telegrams, with 59 Productions. Meredith produced the soundtrack for the 2018 film Eighth Grade. She was appointed Member of the Order of the British Empire (MBE) in the 2019 Birthday Honours for services to music.

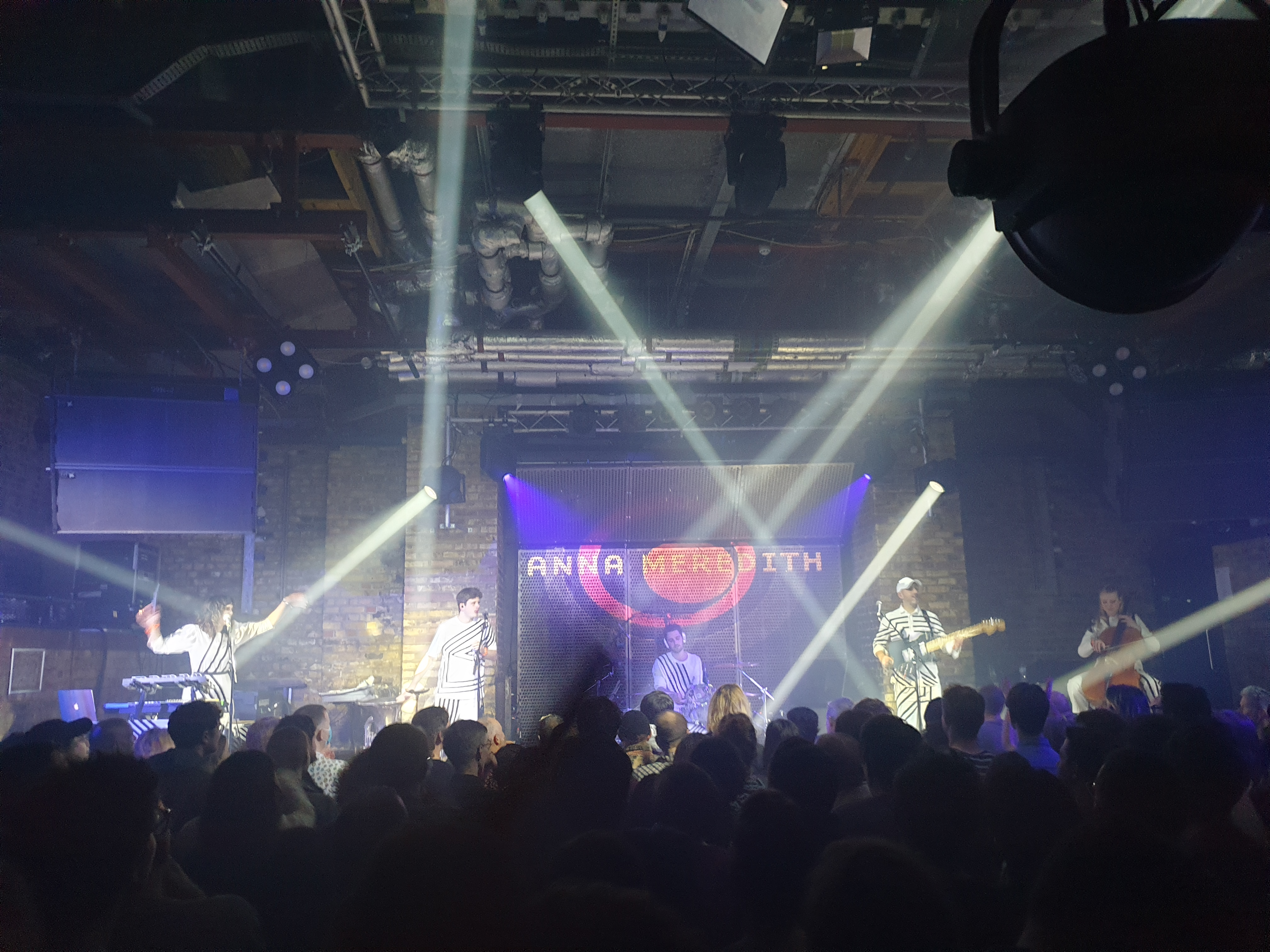
Meredith and her band at Fabric, London, on 10 November 2021, performing in support of the album Fibs. From left to right: Meredith (keys, electronics, percussion, clarinet), Tom Kelly (tuba), Sam Wilson (drums), Jack Ross (electric guitar) and Maddie Cutter (cello).

Her second studio album, Fibs, was released on 25 October 2019. The album was shortlisted for the Mercury Prize 2020. With her band, she toured in support of the album in 2021.

She had announced a new album, Darling, due 2027.

== Discography ==
=== Studio albums ===
- Varmints (2016)
- Anno (2018)
- Fibs (2019)
- Bumps Per Minute: 18 Studies for Dodgems (2021)
- Nuc (2023), with the Ligeti Quartet

=== EPs ===
- Black Prince Fury (2012)
- Jet Black Raider (2013)

=== Soundtracks ===
- Eighth Grade (2018)
- Living With Yourself (2019)
- The End We Start From (2023)
- Tuesday (2023)
- Wicker (2026)
