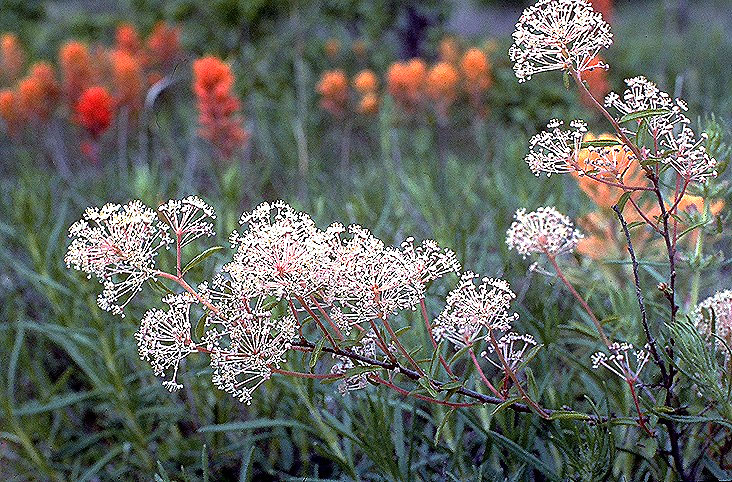

Scientific classification
- Kingdom: Plantae
- Clade: Embryophytes
- Clade: Tracheophytes
- Clade: Spermatophytes
- Clade: Angiosperms
- Clade: Eudicots
- Clade: Rosids
- Order: Rosales
- Family: Rhamnaceae
- Genus: Ceanothus
- Species: C. herbaceus

Binomial name
- Ceanothus herbaceus Rafinesque 1808

Synonyms
- C. h. Raf. var. herbaceus; C. h. Raf. var. pubescens (Torr. & A.Gray ex S. Watson) Shinners; C. ovatus. auct. non Desf.; C. ovatus Desf.var. pubescens Torr. & A.Gray ex S. Watson; C. pubescens (Torr. & A.Gray ex S. Watson) Rydb. ex Small

= Ceanothus herbaceus =

Species of flowering plant

Ceanothus herbaceus, also known as Jersey tea, is a species of shrub in the family Rhamnaceae and is similar to Ceanothus americanus and Ceanothus sanguineus. It is a perennial shrub which is native to North America.

== Synonyms ==
As for its binomial name, C. herbaceus has several vernacular names: narrow-leaved New Jersey tea, inland ceanothus, inland Jersey tea, prairie root, and smaller redroot.

== Distribution ==
Ceanothus herbaceus naturally occurs throughout North America. It can be found in Canada from southeastern Manitoba to Quebec. Within the United States, the plant can be found from Montana east to Massachusetts and Virginia. They range south from Rocky Mountains to New Mexico, east to Arkansas and Louisiana.

== Habitat and ecology ==
The Jersey tea is a drought-tolerant species with roots that can develop up to 15 feet. It grows in well-drained soils and in full sun. The basal shoots grows faster following a fire.

It is one of the host plants of the mottled duskywing (Erynnis martialis) in its Eastern-North American distribution.

== Morphology ==
Ceanothus herbaceus is an erect shrub, ranging between 0.5 and 1 meter in height. The shrub is mainly hemispheric in shape with its branches varying from ascending to spreading. The distal branchlets, which grows from the main stem are flexible and have internodes between 12–31 mm long. They are usually smooth in texture and green in color. The bark of the stem is grayish brown, and the stipules, which are outgrowths on either side of the base of a leaf stalk, are thin and deciduous.

The leaves of the shrub are alternate and deciduous. The petiole, which attaches the leaf blade to the stem, is approximately 3–5 mm long. The leaf blades vary between 35–74 mm longitudinally and 10–32 mm laterally and come in a diverse shapes, including wide, narrowly elliptic to lanceolate, eventually narrowing to acute to obtuse point at the apex. Three veins arise unevenly just above the leaf base. The leaves are serrated with rounded teeth around the margin; about 37–71 per leaf. The upper surface of the leaf is dull green and nearly glabrous. The lower surface is dull green with long, soft unmatted hair, often drying rusty brown. The shrub has a terminal inflorescence which is approximately 15–30 mm long. It is panicle-like and maintains a hemispheric shape. Holding the inflorescence and providing it support is a long stem, known as peduncle. It is typically 26–48 mm in length, usually with a few reduced leaves near the base. Rachis, which is the main axis of the inflorescence, and peduncles are puberulent to somewhat tomentulose. Pedicel, a stem that attaches single flower the main stem of the inflorescence, is about 5–11 mm long and often glabrous.

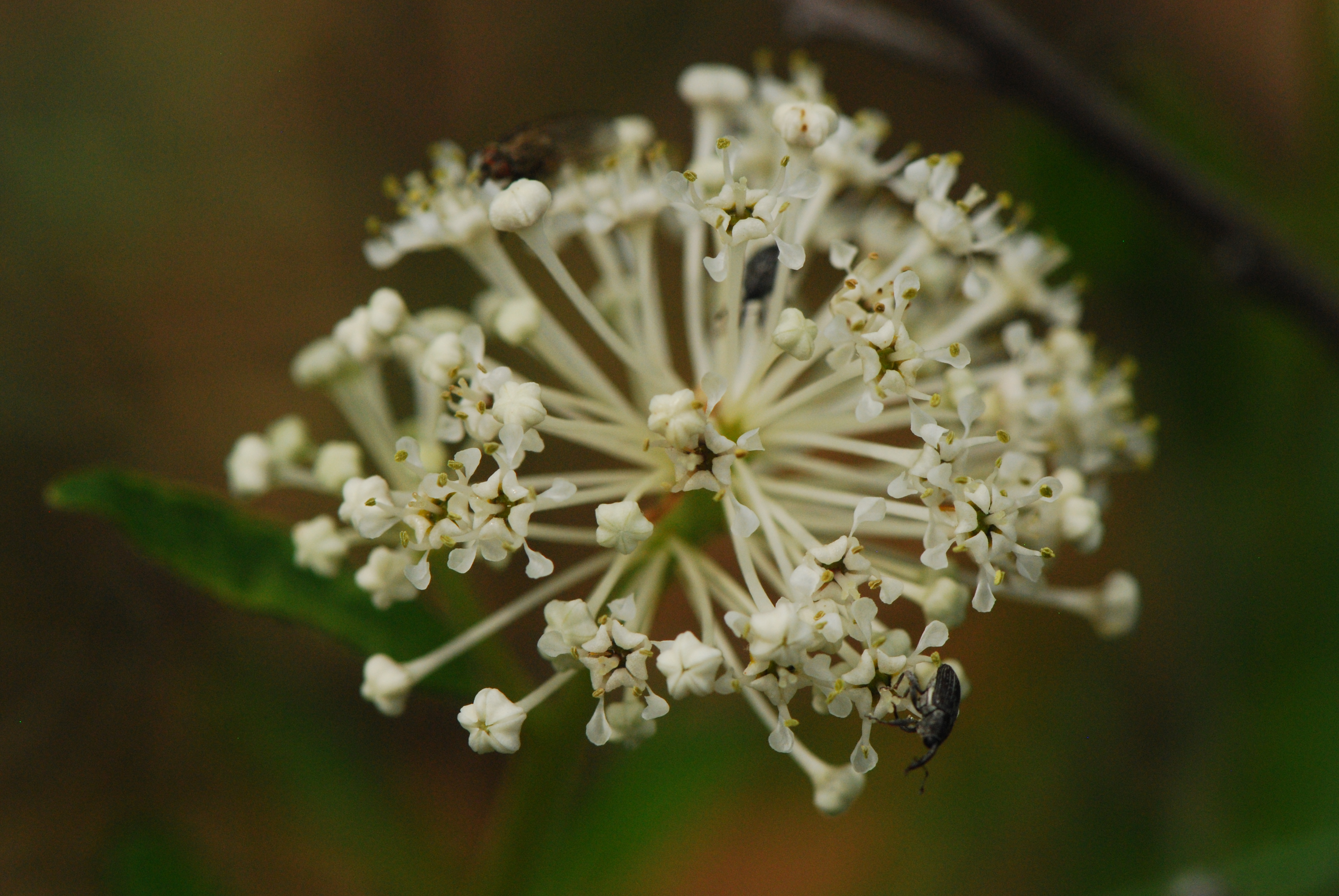
Close-up on flowers.

=== Flowers and fruit ===
The small, white flowers of C. herbaceus in a dense, rounded cluster are about 0.5 to 0.75 inch wide. It has its disk either dull white or greenish. It has calyces with 5 incurved lobes and 5 petals and sepals. The flower is spoon-shaped and clawed, that consists of 5 stamens. The plant bears a fruit that is 3–4.5 mm wide. The fruit is a three-lobed capsule about 3/16 inches in diameter that opens at maturity to release seeds. The seeds are usually brown and 2–2.5 mm long, and come in variety of shapes ranging from subglobose to ovoid. The flowering occurs between March and August and fruiting between July and September. The flower attracts insects, which aid in pollination. The fruit attracts birds, including bobwhite quail, that feed on the seeds. It also serves as a host plant to the azure blue butterfly.

== Usage ==
The Ojibwe take a decoction of the root as a cough remedy. The Brulé Lakota brew the leaves into a tea. The plant is grown as an ornament, and has a symbiotic relationship with a nitrogen-fixing bacteria. In the current day, the properties of the roots help treat asthma, bronchitis and coughs. The flowers are rich in saponins and can be used to produce soap.

== Conservation ==
Ceanothus herbaceus is an endangered species in Illinois, Indiana, Kentucky, New York, Ohio, and Vermont.

== See also ==
- Rhododendron groenlandicum, known as swamp tea
