= Varmints (album) =

Studio album by Anna Meredith
- Released: 4 March 2016
- Genre: Electronic
- Length: 47:26
- Label: Moshi Moshi

Anna Meredith chronology
Jet Black Raider (2013)	Varmints (2016)	Anno (2018)

Varmints is the debut studio album by the Scottish composer and electronica musician Anna Meredith, released on 4 March 2016 on Moshi Moshi. The album won Scottish Album of the Year Award in 2016.

== Critical reception ==
Professional ratings
Aggregate scores
Source	Rating
AnyDecentMusic?	7.8/10
Metacritic	84/100
Review scores
Source	Rating
DIY	4/5 stars
The Line of Best Fit	8/10
Loud and Quiet	8/10
MusicOMH	4.5/5 stars
Pitchfork	8.4/10
Q	4/5 stars
Spectrum Culture	3.5/5 stars
Uncut	8/10

In a highly positive review for Pitchfork, Laura Snapes awarded Varmints with the website's "Best New Music" label, writing: "[Anna Meredith's] first wholly independent project reveals her to be one of the most innovative minds in modern British music: She wears her obvious theoretical grounding lightly and never lets it obstruct her ecstatic quest for new ideas and deranged stimuli. And Varmints is a knockout, the kind that makes you see cartoon stars."

=== Accolades ===
Publication	Accolade	Year	Rank	Ref.
Pitchfork	The 20 Best Experimental Albums of 2016	2016	—	
The Quietus	Albums of the Year 2016	2016	49	
The Skinny	Top 50 Albums of 2016	2016	17	
The Wire	Top 50 Releases of 2016	2016	17	

== Track listing ==
No.	Title	Length
1.	"Nautilus"	5:30
2.	"Taken"	4:50
3.	"Scrimshaw"	4:43
4.	"Something Helpful"	3:13
5.	"R-Type"	4:42
6.	"Dowager"	5:22
7.	"The Vapours"	6:33
8.	"Honeyed Words"	3:17
9.	"Last Rose"	3:31
10.	"Shill"	2:47
11.	"Blackfriars"	2:58
