= Rhododendron (disambiguation) =

Rhododendron is a genus of flowering plants in the family Ericaceae.

Rhododendron may also refer to:

- MV Rhododendron, a Washington State ferry
- Rhododendron, Oregon, United States
- Rhododendron Mountain, British Columbia, Canada
- Rhododendron Species Foundation and Botanical Garden, Federal Way, Washington
- Rhododendron State Park, a state park in Fitzwilliam, New Hampshire
- Rhododendron (horse) (born 2014), Thoroughbred racehorse
- Rhododendron, a song in the Eighth Grade (soundtrack)

== See also ==
- Rhododendron County Park
- Rhododendron Creek
