= Fibs (album) =

Studio album by Anna Meredith
- Released: 25 October 2019
- Genre: Electronic
- Length: 47:26
- Label: Moshi Moshi

Anna Meredith chronology
Anno (2018)	Fibs (2019)

Professional ratings
Aggregate scores
Source	Rating
AnyDecentMusic?	7.5/10
Metacritic	77/100
Review scores
Source	Rating
AllMusic	4/5 stars
Exclaim!	7/10
The Guardian	4/5 stars
Pitchfork	7.7/10
PopMatters	8/10 stars

Fibs is the second full-length studio album by the British composer and electronica musician Anna Meredith, released on 25 October 2019 on Moshi Moshi. It was nominated for the 2020 Mercury Prize.

== Track listing ==
Fibs track listing
No.	Title	Length
1.	"Sawbones"	4:38
2.	"Inhale Exhale"	3:46
3.	"Calion"	5:06
4.	"Killjoy"	3:45
5.	"Bump"	3:50
6.	"Moonmoons"	4:15
7.	"Divining"	4:13
8.	"Limpet"	3:16
9.	"Ribbons"	4:12
10.	"Paramour"	4:56
11.	"Unfurl"	2:14
Total length:		47:26
