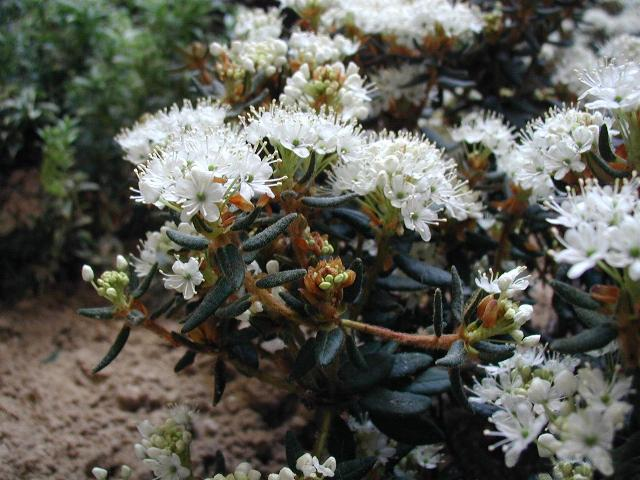
- R. tomentosum in flower

Scientific classification
- Kingdom: Plantae
- Clade: Tracheophytes
- Clade: Angiosperms
- Clade: Eudicots
- Clade: Asterids
- Order: Ericales
- Family: Ericaceae
- Genus: Rhododendron
- Species: R. tomentosum

Binomial name
- Rhododendron tomentosum Harmaja

Synonyms
- List: Ledum decumbens (Aiton) Lodd. ex Steud.; Ledum dilatatum Rupr.; Ledum graveolens Gilib.; Ledum groenlandicum f. denudatum Vict. & J.Rousseau; Ledum maximum (Nakai) A.P.Khokhr. & Mazurenko; Ledum palustre L.; Ledum palustre var. angustifolium Hook.; Ledum palustre var. decumbens Aiton; Ledum palustre f. decumbens (Aiton) Y.L.Chou & S.L.Tung; Ledum palustre subsp. decumbens (Aiton) Hultén; Ledum palustre f. denudatum (Vict. & J.Rousseau) B.Boivin; Ledum palustre subsp. longifolium (Freyn) Kitag.; Ledum palustre var. minus Nakai; Ledum palustriforme A.P.Khokhr. & Mazurenko; Ledum tomentosum Stokes; Rhododendron palustre (L.) Kron & Judd; Rhododendron subarcticum Harmaja; Rhododendron tomentosum subsp. decumbens (Aiton) Elven & D.F.Murray; Rhododendron tomentosum subsp. subarcticum (Harmaja) G.D.Wallace

= Rhododendron tomentosum =

Marsh Labrador tea

Species of plant

Rhododendron tomentosum (syn. Ledum palustre), commonly known as marsh Labrador tea, northern Labrador tea, marsh rosemary or wild rosemary, is a flowering plant in the subsection Ledum of the large genus Rhododendron in the family Ericaceae.

== Description ==
It is a low shrub growing to 50 cm (rarely up to 120 cm) tall with evergreen leaves 12–50 mm long and 2–12 mm broad. The flowers are small, with a five-lobed white corolla, and produced several together in a corymb 3–5 cm diameter. They emit strong smell to attract bees and other pollinating insects.

== Distribution and habitat ==
It grows in northern latitudes in North America, Greenland, Canada, and Alaska, in Europe in the northern and central parts, and in Asia south to northern China, Korea and Japan. It grows in peaty soils, shrubby areas, moss and lichen tundra.

== Chemical compounds ==
All parts of the plant contain poisonous terpenes that affect the central nervous system. First symptoms of overdose are dizziness and disturbances in movement, followed by spasms, nausea, and unconsciousness. Among the plant's terpenes is ledol, a cyclic alcohol with deliriant effects, although poisonous in large doses. No more than a once daily one teaspoonful of dried leaves to one cup of boiling water brewed for 5 min of this beverage should be drunk daily due to ledol and grayanotoxin toxicity.

== Similar species ==
This species is not to be confused with the traditionally-used one Rhododendron groenlandicum, found throughout Northern North America.

== Uses ==
=== Herbal medicine ===
Rhododendron tomentosum is used in herbalism to make an herbal tea called "Labrador tea". However, no material benefit has been documented in any properly controlled study.

=== Other uses ===
Marsh Labrador tea has traditionally been used as a gruit in brewing beer in the Middle Ages. Due to its strong fragrance, it has also formerly been used as a natural deterrent against clothes moths, also mosquitos and bugs in general, in Scandinavia and in Eastern Europe.
