= Eighth Grade (soundtrack) =

2018 soundtrack album / film score by Anna Meredith

Soundtrack album / film score by Anna Meredith
- Released: July 13, 2018
- Recorded: 2018
- Genre: electronic; pop; indie rock; experimental; ambience; symphony; orchestral
- Length: 40:30
- Label: Columbia
- Producer: Anna Meredith; Bo Burnham

Anna Meredith chronology
Anno (2018)	Eighth Grade (2018)	Living with Yourself (2019)

Eighth Grade (Original Motion Picture Soundtrack) is the film score / soundtrack album to the 2018 film Eighth Grade, directed by Bo Burnham in his feature directorial debut. The score is composed by Scottish musician Anna Meredith marking her feature film debut, consisting primarily of electronic score to capture the "intensity of Kayla's experience" rather than a melodic score. Burnham additionally produced few cues for the score. The album was released on July 13, 2018 by Columbia Records, to positive response from critics.

== Development ==
The musical score was composed by Scottish electronic composer and solo musician Anna Meredith in her feature film debut. Deliberately avoiding a "cute" score, Burnham turned to electronic music because "Kayla's experience feels so intense to her," and chose her to score for the film as her style was unlike "a lot of electronic music […] very cold and masculine." Since the film was her maiden film score, Meredith described the process as a "challenge," emphasizing that as a composer, "you don't just present the music you want. You try to do what the film needs." The scoring process took place for a week at her studio in London, which Burnham described the score to be "foreground music" and not "background music".

Meredith did not want the score to be "detached" and "distant" and wanted it "to feel like it had the immediacy of [Kayla's] reactions". While scoring, she felt invested in Kayla's character as "it was certainly relatable to my own experience as a teenager" and "felt really connected with it". A musician himself, Burnham had also put few demos of electronic music for composition and executive produced the soundtrack. He did not want separate themes for Kayla or her father, as according to Meredith, she said "[Kayla] lives so much in the moment, so I tried to look at each moment as distinctly as I could within our sound world of certain types of synths I was using". A lot of detailing was went into the creation of the music, especially in synchronised efforts of visuals and music.

Meredith further stated "I write visual sketches, graphic sketches of the shapes of the music. I have these mini maps of whatever kind of bit of music I'm writing that help me plan out the drama of the music, and maybe just some adjectives. You know, “this is going to be a punchy bit, or this is going to be a silvery bit or oily bit” or whatever to help me make a mood map. But it's not imagining seahorses. [Laughs] It's not that sort of stuff so much. Maybe later on I might try it, but to make the actual music is a little less fun unfortunately and, I was going to say academic, but it's more making little mini briefs for myself." She further reused some of the cues, including her 2013 single "Nautilus" as Burnham had the cue in mind for the pool sequence.

== Reception ==
Meredith's score received critical acclaim from music critics. Vice's Nick Fulton wrote "Composer Anna Meredith's bold electronic creations sound how thirteen feels". James Rettig of Stereogum wrote "Meredith's music has always been playfully dark, which lends itself well to the early adolescent pubescence that the film explores. There's whimsical cotton candy-hued segments that also sound sort of terrifying, like the rush of emotions you'd typically feel when you're 13 and awkward as hell and also excited all the time, for seemingly no reason."

The Guardian's Mark Kermode praised Meredith's score as "mesmerising" and "intrinsically interwoven into the fabric of the film as Giorgio Moroder's Oscar-winning electronic accompaniment to Midnight Express (1978) or Mica Levi's unnerving sonic explorations for Under the Skin (2013)". He further wrote "From pulsing woozy disorientation to spiralling anxiety and transcendent aspiration, Meredith's music strikes the perfect chord throughout, as thrillingly expressive and magically immersive as this wonderful film deserves". Vulture's Emily Yoshida called the score as "excitable" and lends "a pulsating thump to Kayla's doofy, dreamy-eyed crush, and a shakily hopeful buzz to the chaos of a middle-school hallway". She further stated few soundtrack cues that are "insightful and hilarious".

Online websites such as Stereogum, IndieWire, and Vulture, listed it as one of the "best film scores of 2018". IndieWire's David Ehrlich wrote "Anna Meredith's volatile and high-pitched score, sounds like it's being pumped out of a helium-powered synthesizer. From the war-like dread of the pool party scene, to the chipper resilience that backdrops the bits where young Kayla Fisher finally comes into her own, Meredith's score is present and alive — hyper-reactive to the world around it, but also out of sync with its surrounding."

== Track listing ==
No.	Title	Length
1.	"Being Yourself"	02:47
2.	"Putting Yourself Out There"	01:38
3.	"Nautilus"	05:29
4.	"How To Be Confident"	02:40
5.	"Stay Calm"	01:19
6.	"The Banana"	00:53
7.	"High School"	01:08
8.	"Rhododendron"	03:34
9.	"How To Be Confident (Again)"	01:10
10.	"A Lot At Once"	00:57
11.	"Honeyed Words"	03:13
12.	"MGMS Class of 2017"	01:09
13.	"The Coolest Girl in The World"	01:54
14.	"REDBLUEGREEN"	03:58
15.	"MIDI"	03:42
16.	"Nervous All the Time"	01:58
17.	"A Really Good Day"	01:40
18.	"How To Be Confident (For Real)"	01:13
Total length:		40:30

Future Club by Perturbator is also featured during the movie.

== Release history ==
Region	Date	Format(s)	Label	Version(s)	Ref.
Various	July 13, 2018	Digital download; streaming	Columbia	Standard	
Various	August 3, 2018	CD	Columbia	Standard	
Various	September 7, 2018	Vinyl	Columbia	Deluxe	
