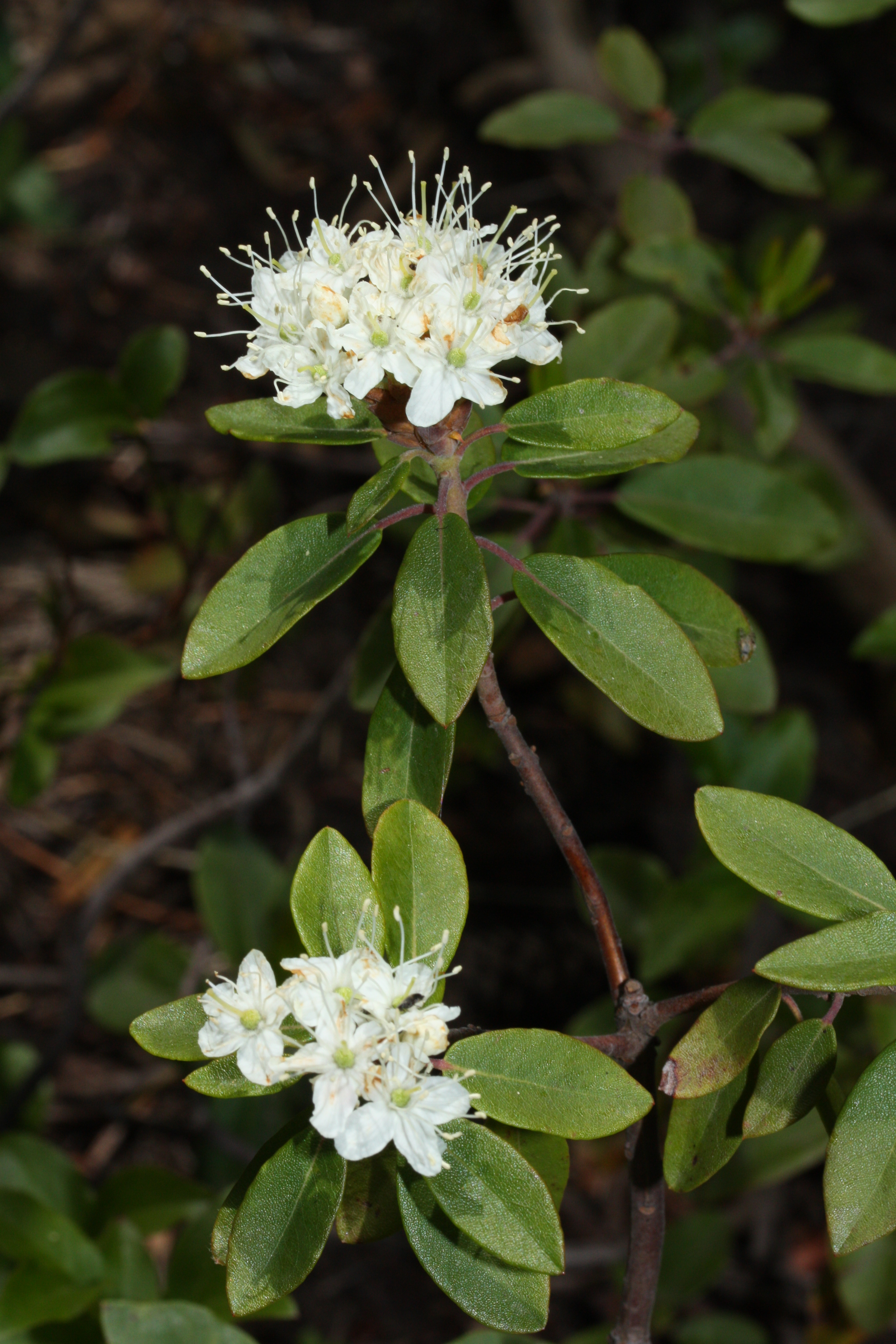

Conservation status
- Secure (NatureServe)

Scientific classification
- Kingdom: Plantae
- Clade: Embryophytes
- Clade: Tracheophytes
- Clade: Angiosperms
- Clade: Eudicots
- Clade: Asterids
- Order: Ericales
- Family: Ericaceae
- Genus: Rhododendron
- Species: R. columbianum

Binomial name
- Rhododendron columbianum (Piper) Harmaja

Synonyms
- Ledum columbianum Piper; Ledum glandulosum Nuttall 1843, not Rhododendron glandulosum (Standley ex Small) Millais 1917; Rhododendron neoglandulosum Harmaja

= Rhododendron columbianum =

Species of shrub

Rhododendron columbianum, commonly known as western Labrador tea, swamp tea, or muskeg tea, is a shrub that is widespread in the western United States and in western Canada, reported from British Columbia, Alberta, Washington, Oregon, Idaho, California, Montana, Wyoming, Utah, Nevada, and Colorado. It grows in wet places from sea level up to 3,500 m (11,000 ft). It was formerly known as Ledum columbianum. Its origins date back to the late Pliocene.

== Description ==
Rhododendron columbianum is a shrub up to 2 m (6 ft 7 in) tall, spreading by means of underground rhizomes. The evergreen leaves are ovate to lanceolate, fragrant when crushed. Flowers are white to cream, borne in groups of 10 to 35. The leaves grow very close to the stalk and their bottoms bear tiny white hairs.

== Taxonomy ==
=== History ===
Rhododendron columbianum was originally named Ledum columbianum, so it appears as its former name in many texts. In 2009 Kathleen A. Kron and Walter S. Judd deemed the morphology of genus Ledum alike enough to the Rhododendron genus to combine it into the larger Rhododendron genus. This taxonomic change resulted in the original name of Ledum columbianum being changed to Rhododendron columbianum. Ledum columbianum was removed from the National Wetland Plant List in 2012, but re-added as Rhodedendron columbianum for the official 2013 list publication, where it still remains. Currently, both Rhododendron columbianum and Rhododendron groenlandicum share the common name of Labrador tea.

=== Phylogeny ===
According to The Smithsonian Institution's Paleobotanical Library, a megafossil of R. columbianum was found in Washington and dated to the late Pliocene, along with five other Rhododendron species belonging to the Pliocene era. The genetic crossing of R. groenlandicum and R. neoglandulosum results in R. columbianum. Results from molecular and nuclear phylogenetic analyses indicate that R. columbianum and R. tolmachevii make up a clade most closesly related to R. groenlandicum, R. hypoleucum, and R. tomentosum.

== Uses ==
Rhododendron columbianum has been used medicinally as a tea astringent, diaphoretic, diuretic and laxative properties. The plant can, however, be toxic if the tea is allowed to steep too long. The fragrance of the leaves has also been shown useful in repelling insects and rodents.

== Gallery ==
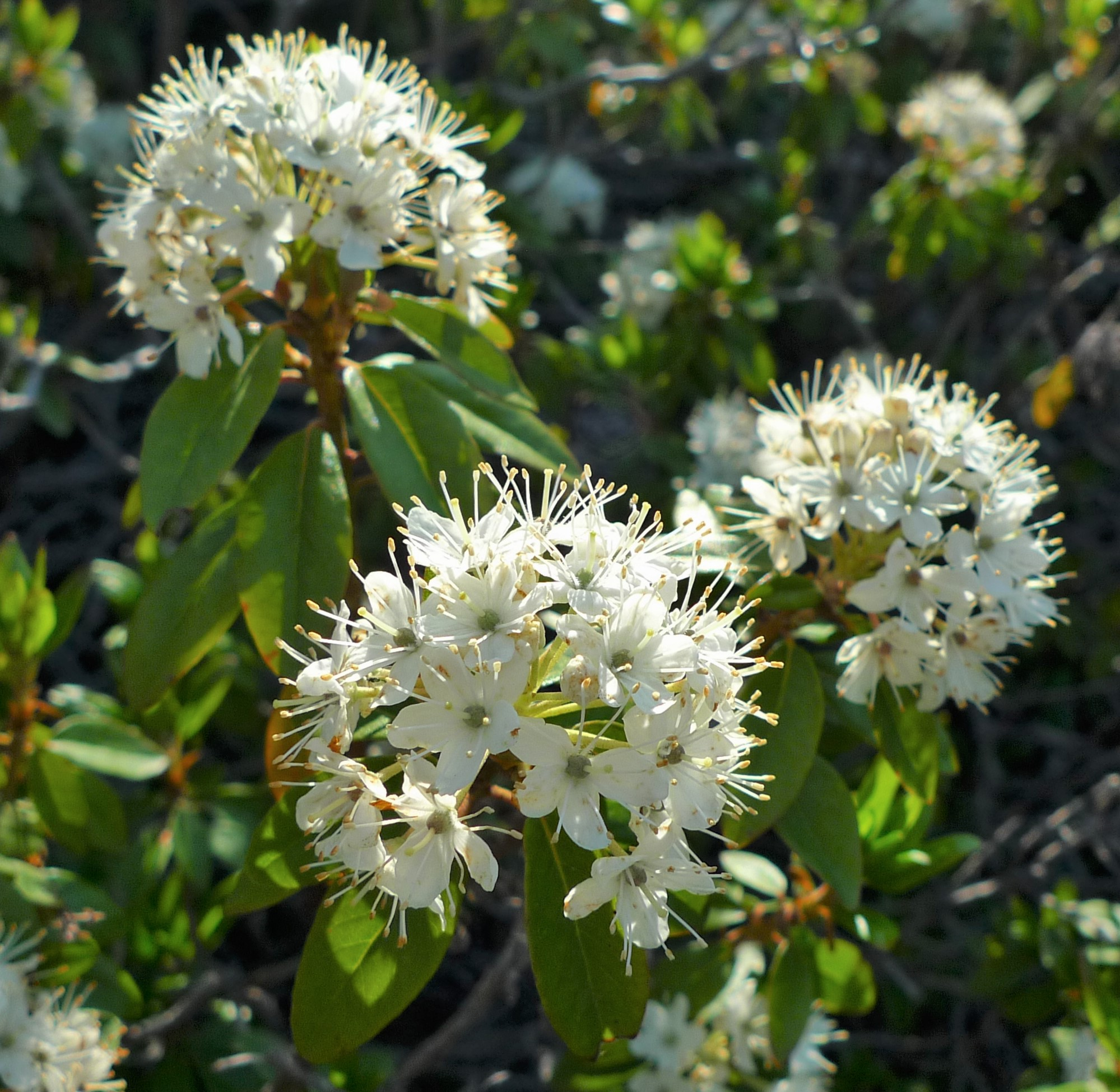

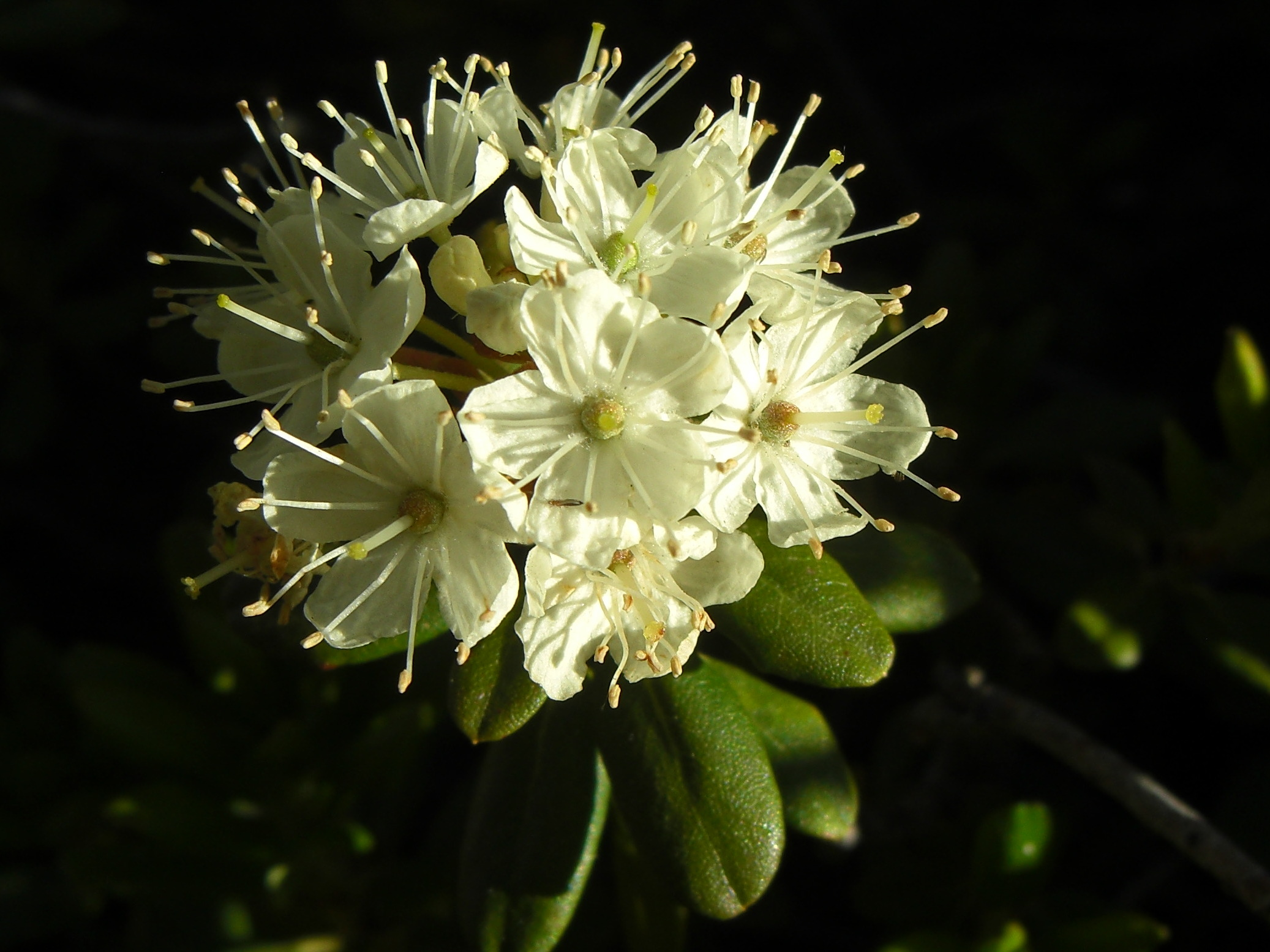

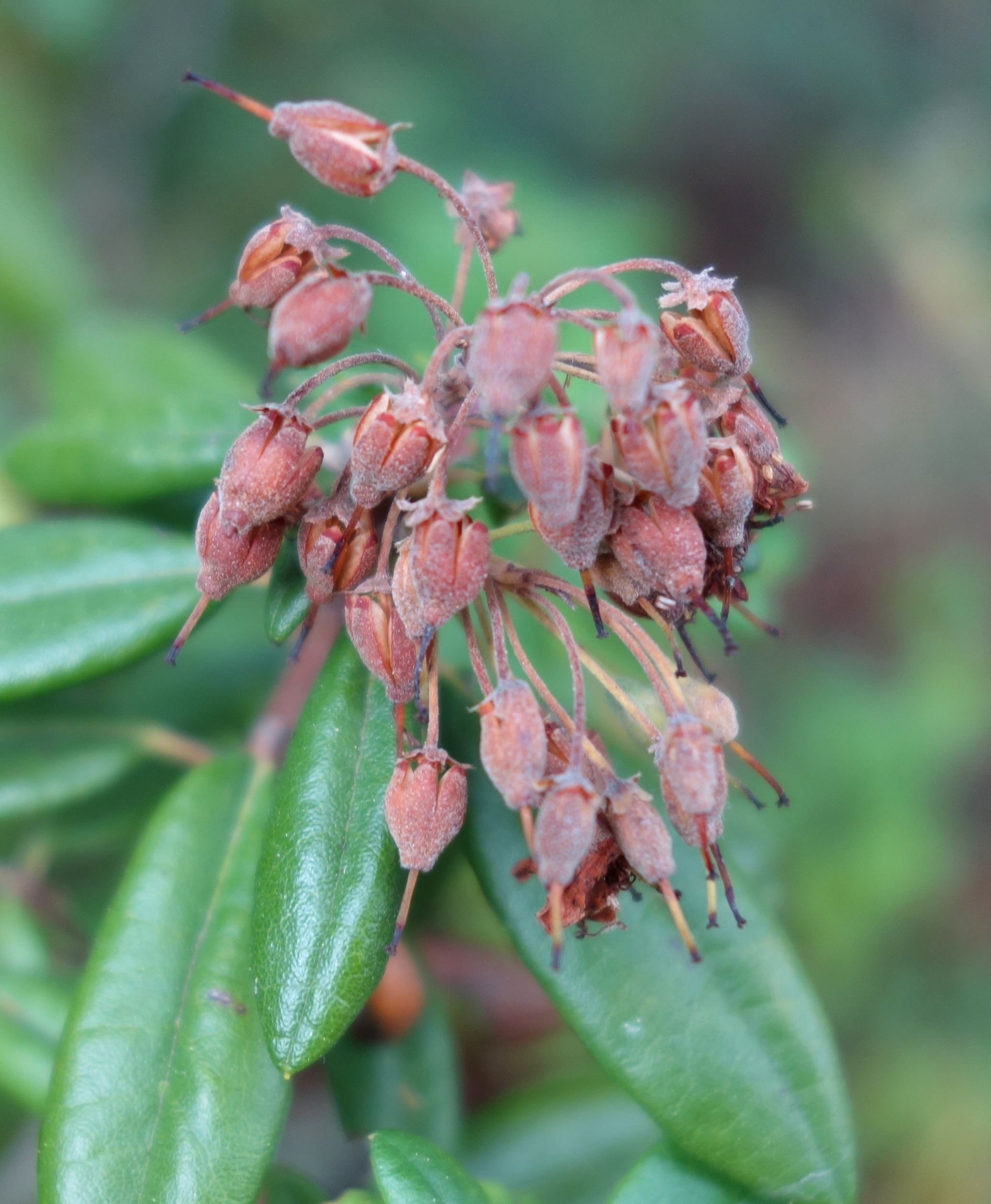

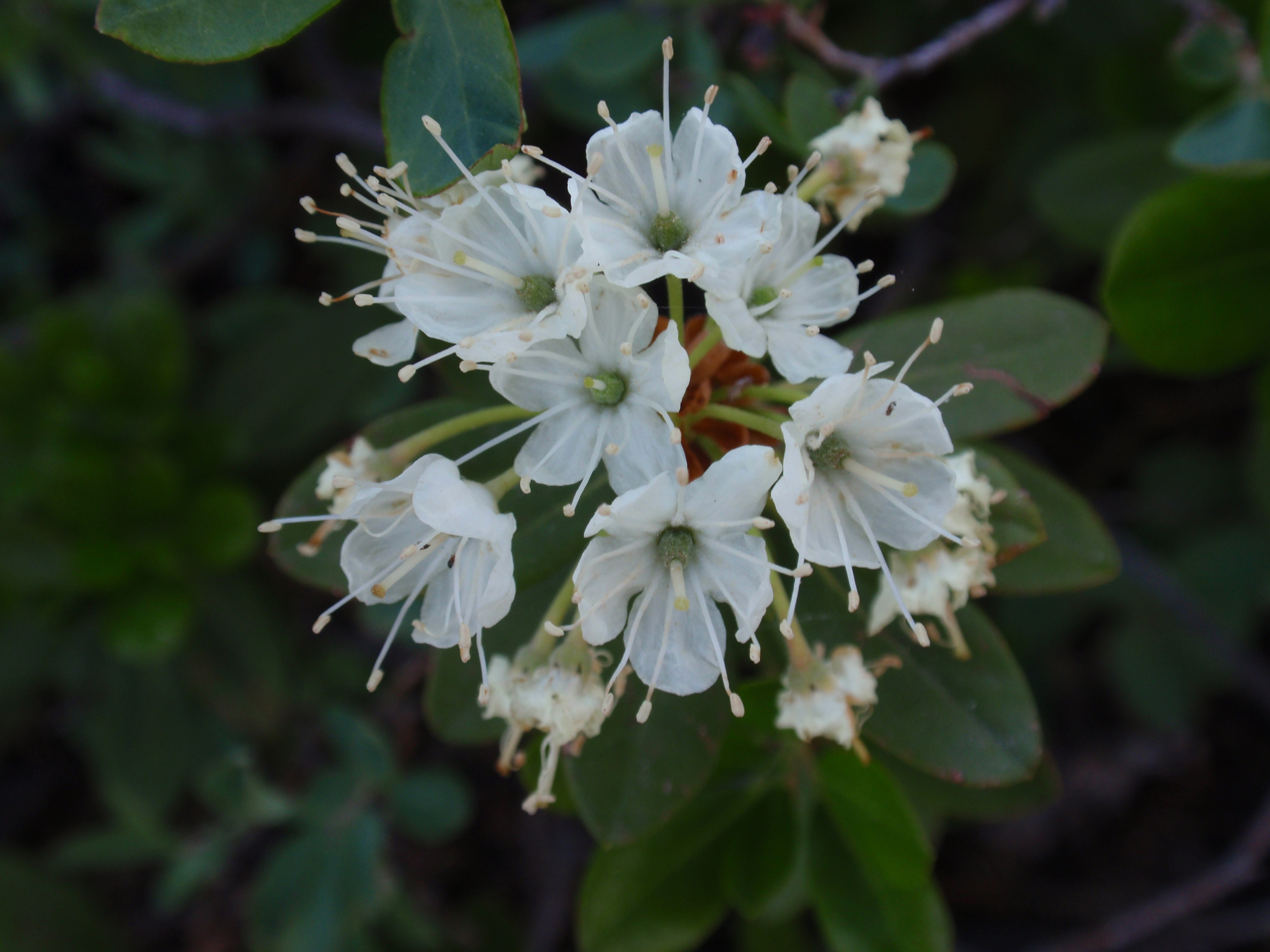
