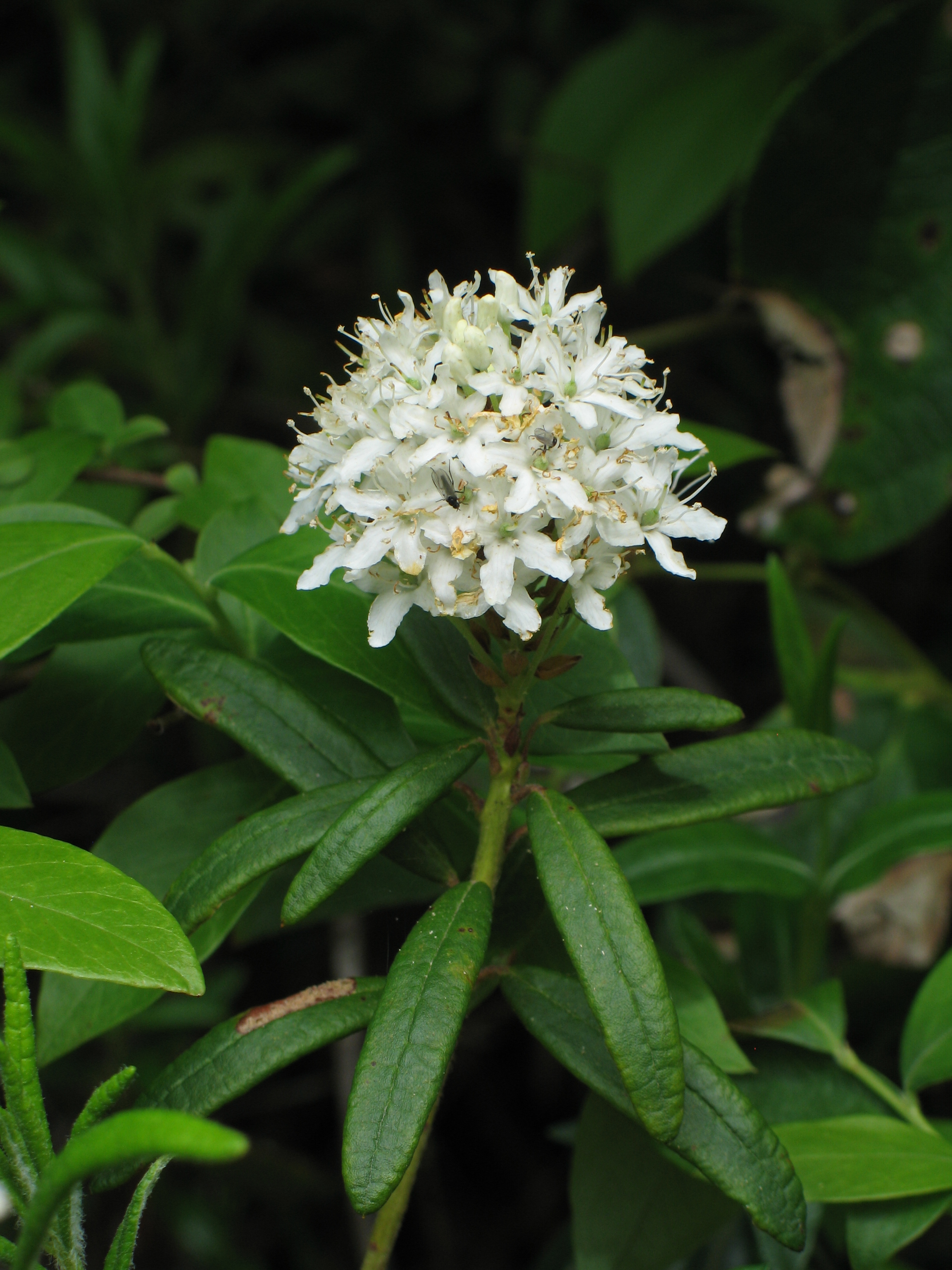

Scientific classification
- Kingdom: Plantae
- Clade: Embryophytes
- Clade: Tracheophytes
- Clade: Spermatophytes
- Clade: Angiosperms
- Clade: Eudicots
- Clade: Asterids
- Order: Ericales
- Family: Ericaceae
- Genus: Rhododendron
- Subgenus: Rhododendron subg. Rhododendron
- Section: Rhododendron sect. Rhododendron
- Subsection: R. subsect. Ledum
- Species: R. groenlandicum

Binomial name
- Rhododendron groenlandicum (Oeder) Kron & Judd
- Distribution of Rhododendrom groenlandicum

Synonyms
- Ledum canadense G.Lodd.; Ledum groenlandicum Oeder; Ledum groenlandicum var. aridiphilum D.Löve; Ledum latifolium Jacq.; Ledum latifolium var. canadense (G.Lodd.) DC.; Ledum latifolium var. palustre Alph.Wood; Ledum pacificum Small; Ledum palustre subsp. groenlandicum (Oeder) Hultén; Ledum palustre var. groenlandicum (Oeder) Rosenv.; Ledum palustre var. latifolium (Jacq.) Hook.

= Rhododendron groenlandicum =

Species of flowering plant

Rhododendron groenlandicum (formerly Ledum groenlandicum or Ledum latifolium), known by the common names bog Labrador tea, muskeg tea, swamp tea, in northern Canada, Hudson's Bay tea, and in Greenlandic, Qajaasaq (IPA: [qajaːsɑq], resembling a Kayak), is a species of flowering shrub in the family Ericaceae. Found in northern parts of North America and Greenland, R. groenlandicum grows primarily in bogs and other wetlands, which tend to be also in cold, acidic, and nutrient-poor environments. It has traditionally been used to make medicinal herbal teas among the Dene, Athabaskan, and Inuit, and other indigenous cultures of North America peoples.

== Description ==
It is a low shrub growing to 50 cm (20 in) tall – rarely up to 2 m (6 ft 7 in) – with evergreen leaves 2–6 cm (3/4–2 3/8 in) long and 3–15 mm (1/8–5/8 in) broad. The leaves are wrinkled on top with a thick waxy cuticle and have a leathery texture. The underside is covered in dense white hair that turns red-brown with age. The flowers of R. groenlandicum are small, white, and perfect (bisexual). Their hemispherical clusters have up to 35 flowers with petals approximately 1 cm long. With 5 oval shaped petals it produces a sweet aroma and sticky nectar to attract pollinators.

R. groenlandicum is self-compatible; however, self-fertilization results in a lower fruit set and fewer seeds per fruit "than cross-pollination". Pollination is primarily performed by bees; however, butterflies and beetles can also act as pollinators.

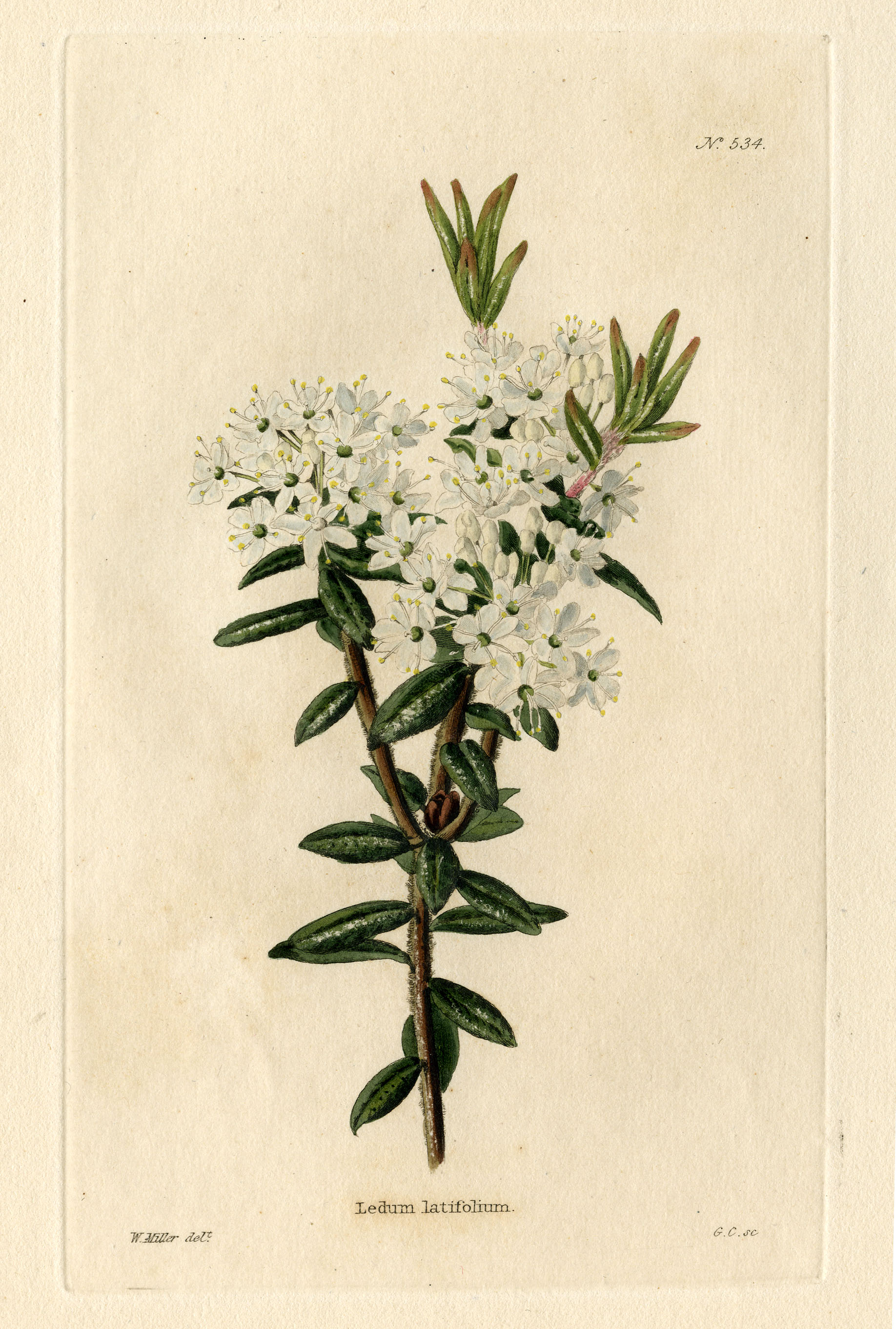
Illustration by William Miller

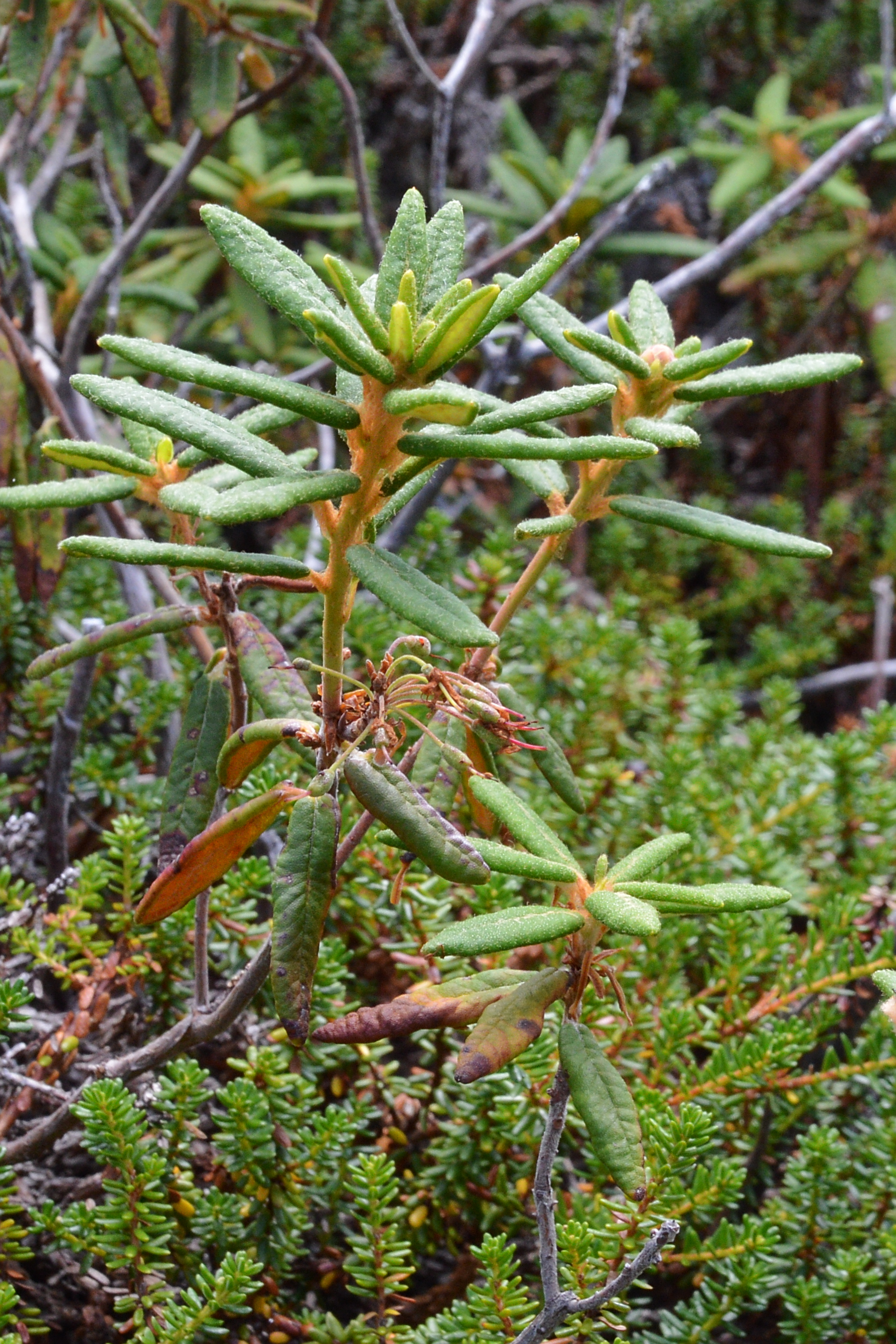
Specimen in Newfoundland and Labrador

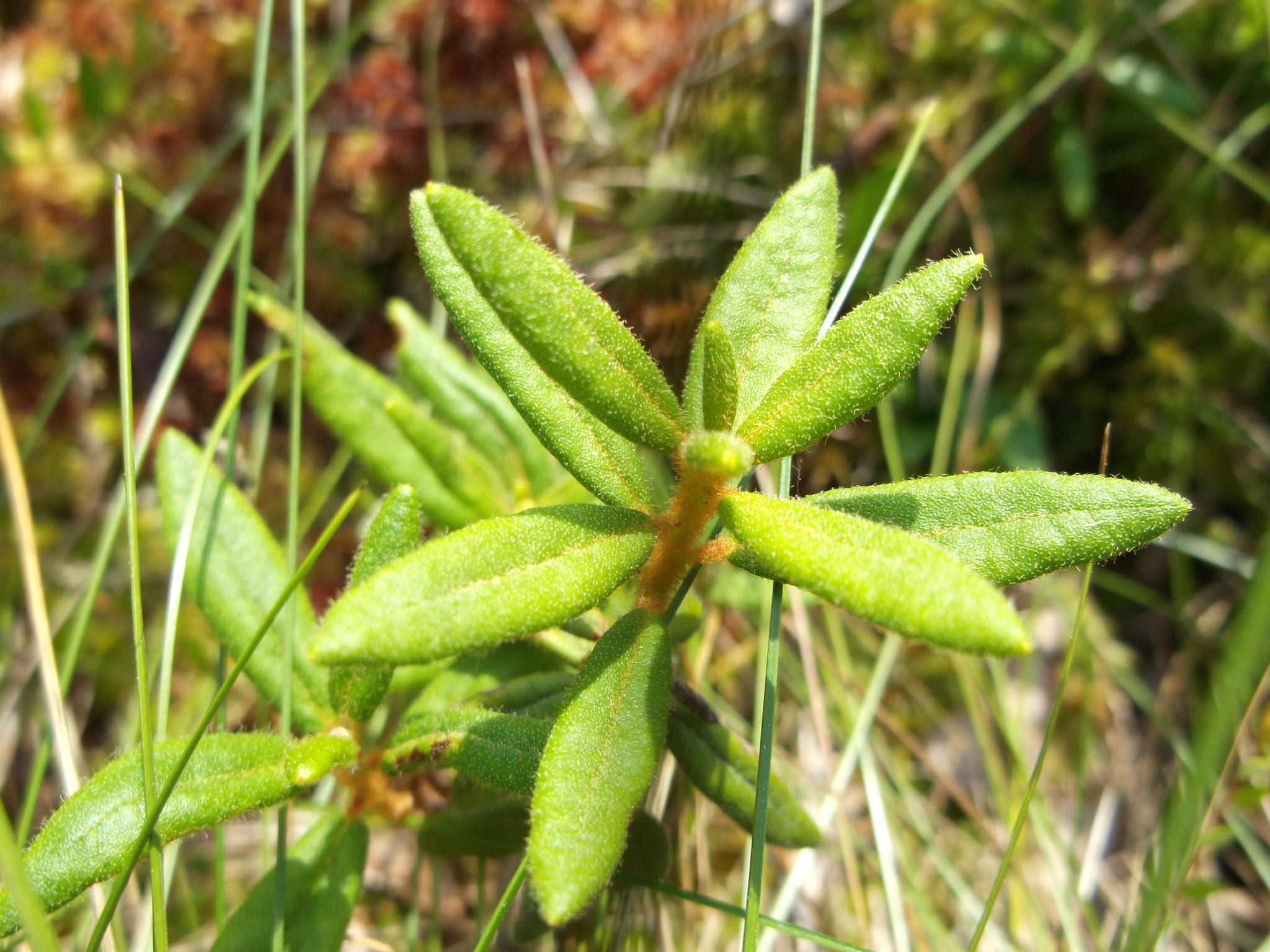
Dry leaves

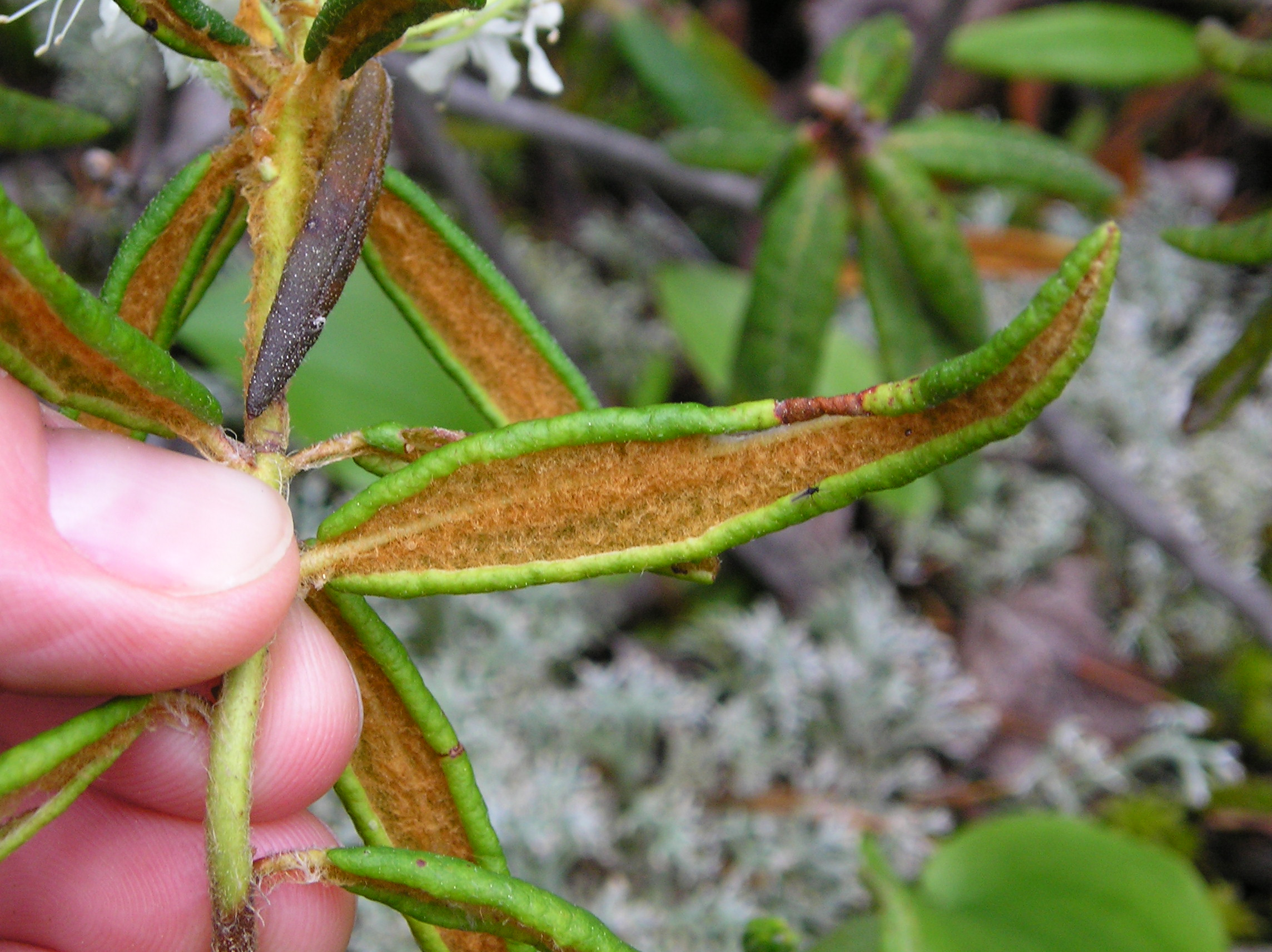
Underside of leaves

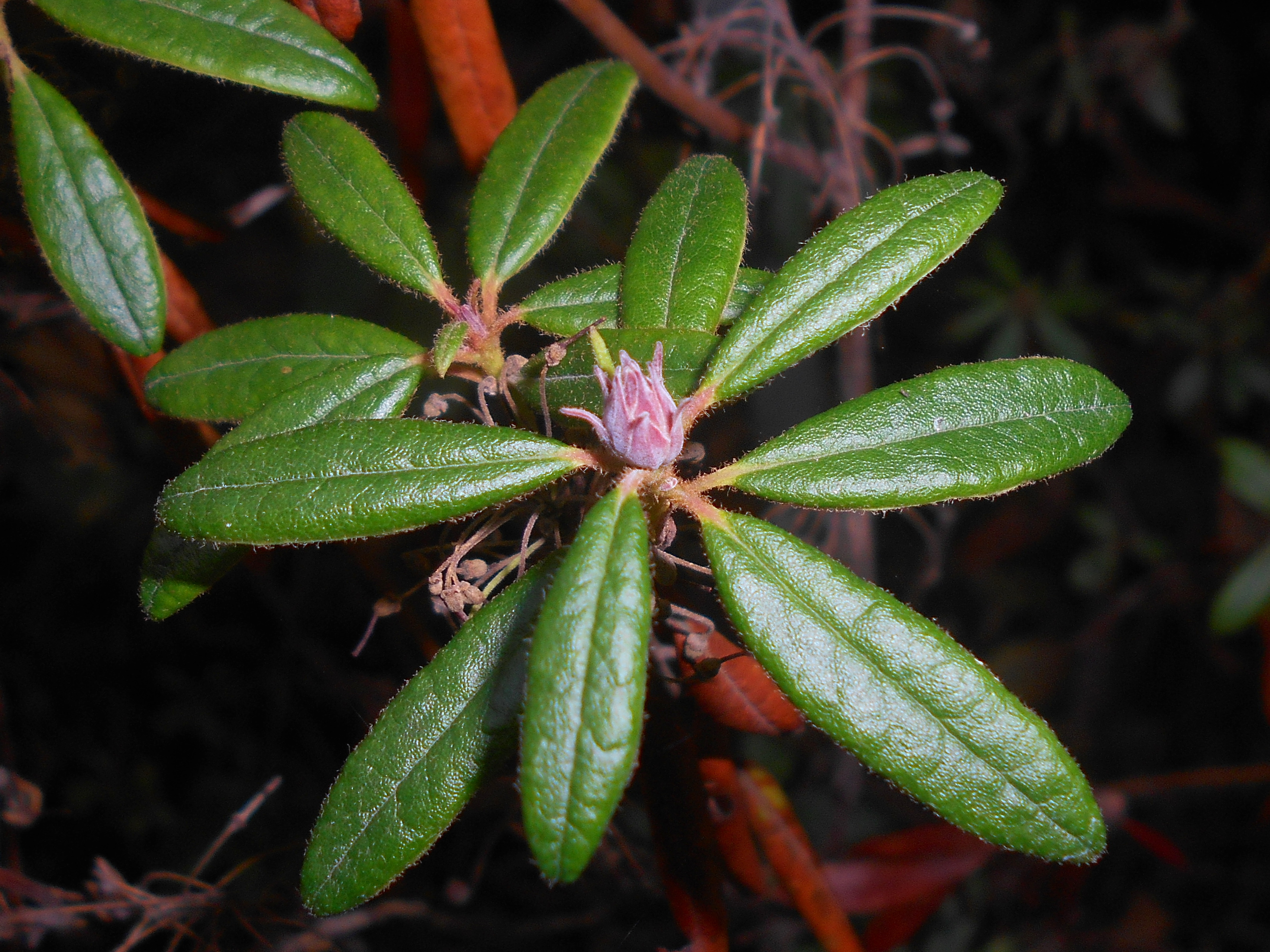
Leaves and buds

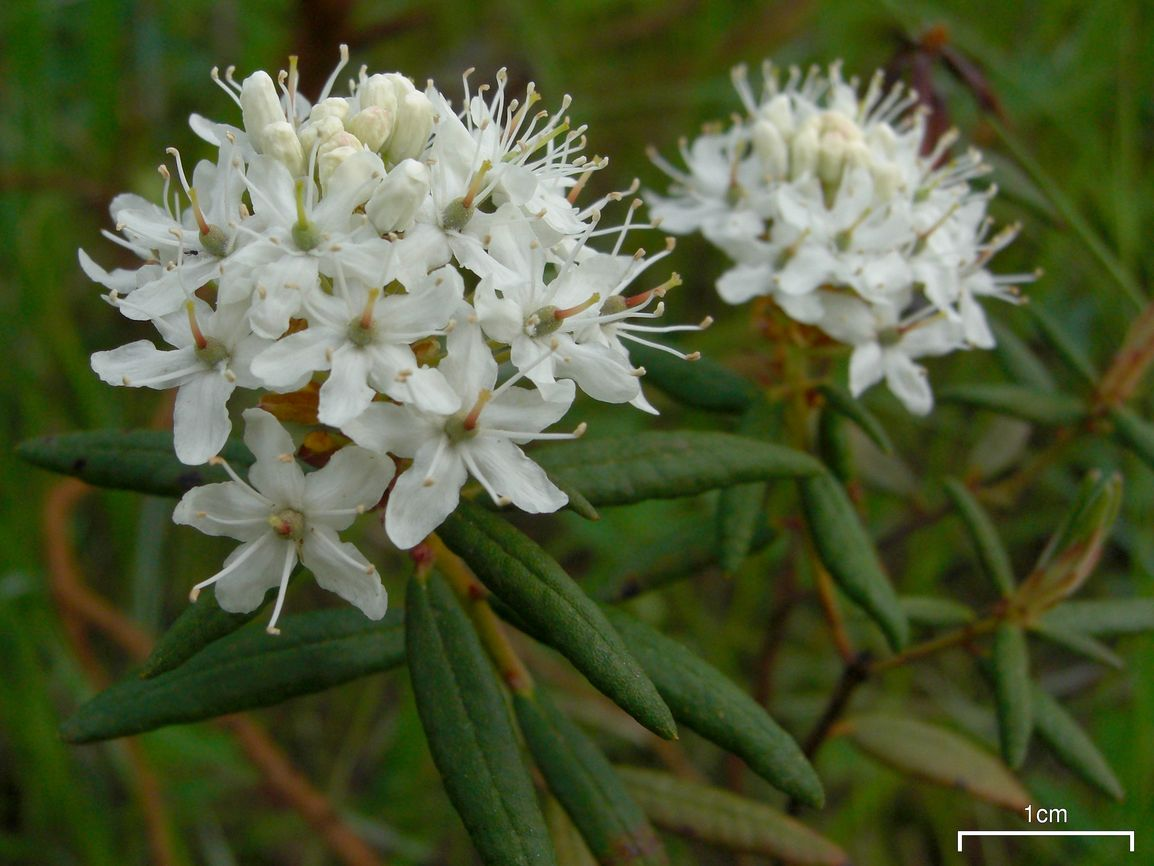
Close-up of flowers

== Distribution and habitat ==
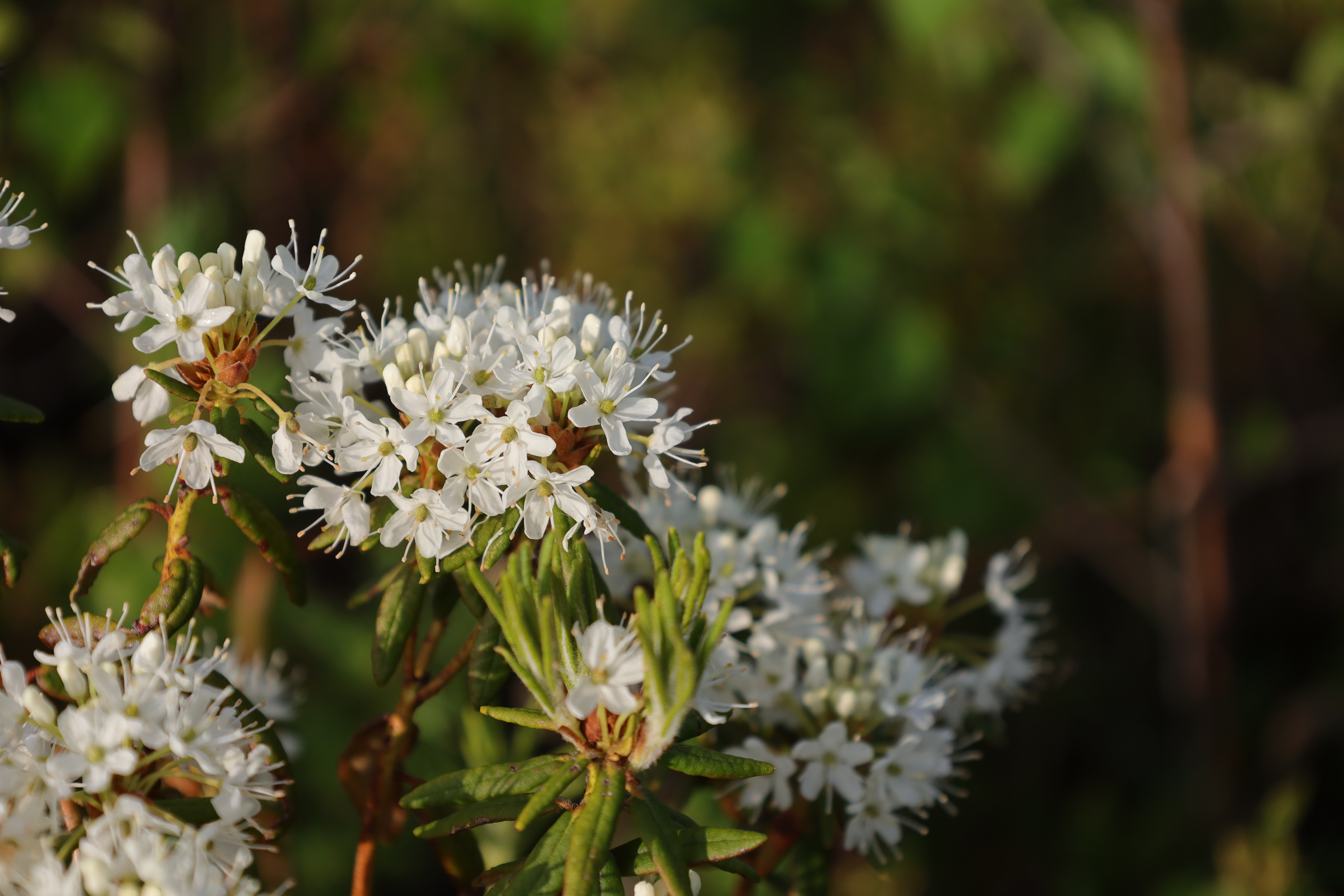
Côte-Nord, Quebec, Canada

It is reported from Greenland, as well as from every province and territory in Canada and in the northern United States including the Northeast (New England, New York, Pennsylvania), the Northwest (Oregon, Washington, Idaho, Alaska), and parts of the Upper Midwest (Michigan, Wisconsin, Minnesota). It grows in bogs, muskegs, and open tundra, as well as occasionally on wet shores and rocky alpine slopes.

== Toxicity ==
The plant contains toxic alkaloids which are poisonous to livestock and may be toxic to humans in concentrated doses.

== Harvesting ==
Due to the plant's slow growth, tea leaves are collected in the spring by taking only one leaf from each of multiple plants. Labrador tea is slow-growing, so only a single new leaf is collected from a plant every other year to avoid damaging the plants.

== Uses ==
The leaves are regularly used to make beverages and medicines—most commonly a fragrant tea—by many Native American tribes such as the Quinault and Makah, the Potawatomi, the Anishinaabe, the Iroquois, and First Nations tribes in Canada. Antioxidant, anti-inflammatory and anticancer activity has been found. When European explorers arrived, they soon adopted these uses as well, dubbing it "Indian plant tea". During the American Revolutionary War, it was used as a substitute for tea. It was used as ale flavoring in Europe prior to hops becoming the main flavoring and preservative ingredient.

Rhododendron groenlandicum is sometimes grown as an ornamental shrub. Its essential oil is also popular in aromatherapy.

== See also ==
- Ceanothus herbaceus, known as Jersey tea
- List of Award of Garden Merit rhododendrons
- List of rhododendron diseases
- List of Rhododendron species
- Rhododendron (disambiguation)
