= The Talkies =

Studio album by Gilla Band
- Released: 17 October 2019
- Studios: Ballintubbert House (Ballintubbert, County Laois); Sonic Studios (Dublin); Grand Street Recording (Brooklyn, New York City)
- Genres: Noise rock; post-punk; experimental rock
- Length: 45:39
- Label: Rough Trade
- Producer: Daniel Fox

Gilla Band chronology
Holding Hands With Jamie (2015)	The Talkies (2019)	Most Normal (2022)

Singles from The Talkies
- 1. "Shoulderblades" Released: 7 June 2019; 2. "Going Norway" Released: 15 August 2019; 3. "Salmon of Knowledge" Released: 4 October 2019

The Talkies is the second studio album by the Irish post-punk band Gilla Band, released in October 2019 through Rough Trade Records, and is their last studio release under their original name of Girl Band in 2021. The album was mostly recorded at Ballintubbert House on the outskirts of Dublin and was produced by bassist Daniel Fox. The album's repetitive and experimental sound is characterised by its unorthodox use of effects-laden guitars, abstract stream-of-consciousness lyrics and stylistic elements from techno and industrial music. Critics have classified the album as noise rock and post-punk, with many noting its dark and unsettling tone.

Three singles – "Shoulderblades", "Going Norway" and "Salmon of Knowledge" – have been released from the album with music videos for the first two. The album received widespread critical acclaim upon its release, with The Irish Times even naming it the best Irish album of all time in 2020.

== Background ==
After the release of their debut album Holding Hands With Jamie in 2015, the band were forced to cancel several of their shows due to lead singer Dara Kiely's worsening mental health (which he had discussed in numerous interviews at the time). The band eventually took a year-long hiatus in 2017 & reconvened in February 2018 to begin recording The Talkies.

The album was recorded in Ballintubbert House: a mansion on the outskirts of Dublin that Fox had gotten a hold of through connections he'd made via his sound engineering & studio work. According to him: "There were lots of good rooms to record in and we knew it’d be a cool place, [...] Not being in a studio, which costs lots of money, means we got it for buttons. So it took a lot of pressure off.”

== Recording ==
According to guitarist Alan Duggan, "the idea behind the album was to make an audio representation of" the Ballintubbert House. Inspired by Marvin Gaye's What's Going On and Kendrick Lamar's To Pimp a Butterfly, the band decided upon using a repetitive motif throughout the album & recording everything in the key of A to lend it a sense of cohesiveness in comparison to their debut. The sessions also involved a lot of experimentation: the Twin Peaks-inspired track "Aibohphobia" (the title term refers to a fear of palindromes), for example, features "guitar riffs recorded backwards and layered on top of each other as Kiely recites a list of palindromes", while the "unsettling" opening track "Prolix" features his heavy breathing from a "semi-panic attack thing" as caught on record during an early rehearsal. The drums on the album were in fact recorded twice: "once on the landing and once in the cellar". During the mixing stage, Fox cut between both takes in order to create the final versions. The band also admitted that much of the album wasn't written by all of the members together, and that instead they "were more into demoing and writing down parts then cutting them up, collaging them together in the computer and reconfiguring them that way.” Kiely, taking inspiration from Leonard Cohen, wrote lyrics from fragments of different songs he'd recorded on "a little organ". He also decided to not use any pronouns in his lyrics, explaining his decision & his writing process for the album in general as follows:

I, you, he, she [...] Those words, when I wasn’t feeling the best, were impactful: ‘I’ was arrogant, ‘you’ would be accusatory. So I thought if I took that away, it would give me a platform to do something different and get out of my comfort zone. But otherwise it was pretty much the same stream-of-consciousness stuff, or I’d overhear things and take that down. I’ve never really written anything that has a general story, so it is rather abstract.

== Music ==
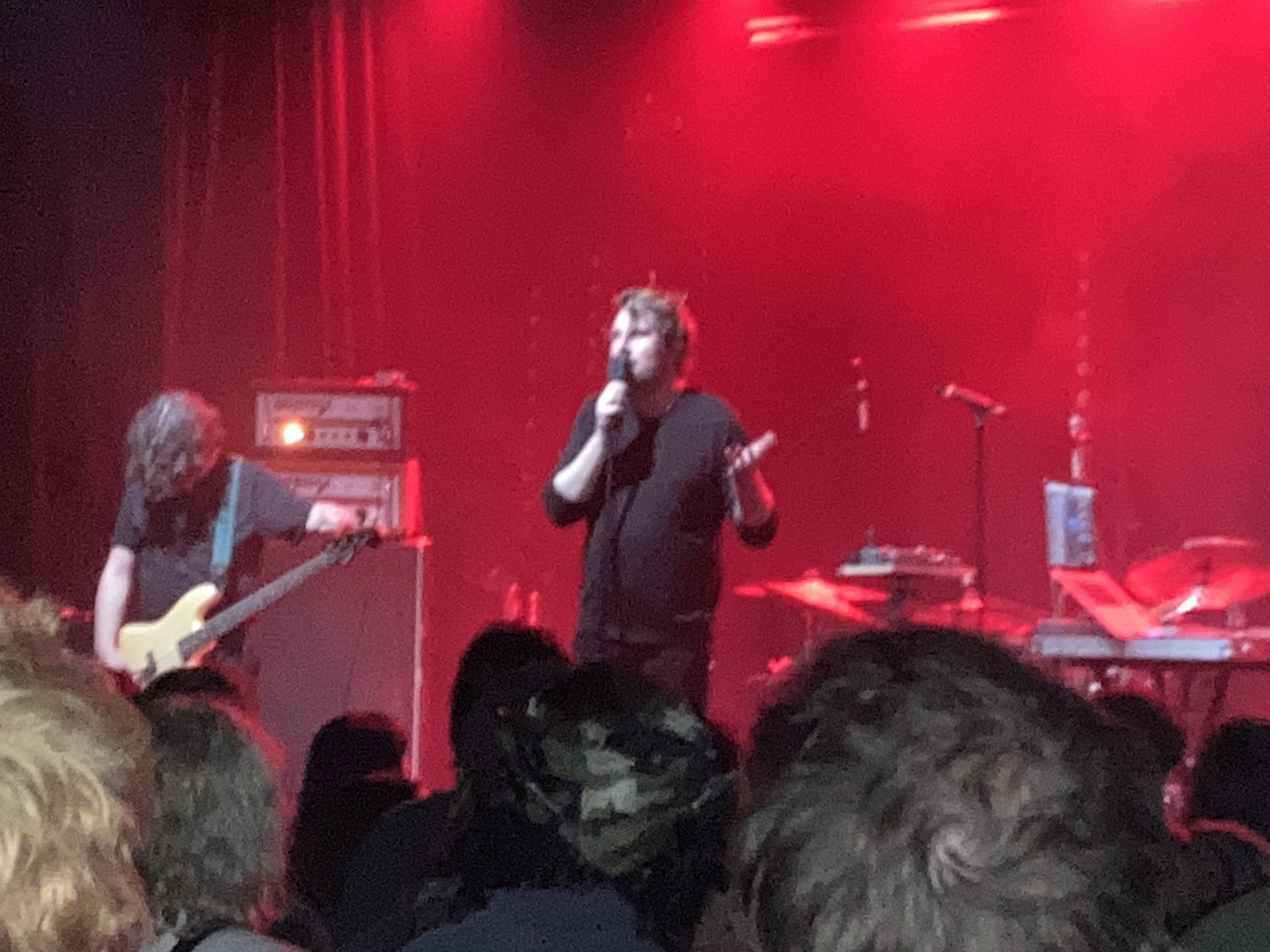
Gilla Band live, 2025

The album has been widely classified as noise rock & post-punk. Pitchfork notes that "[g]uitarist Alan Duggan has completely unlearned the art of riffs and solos, using his instrument solely for textural dissonance—the more nauseating, the better. Bassist Daniel Fox deals exclusively in gut-rumbling frequencies, while drummer Adam Faulkner avoids the snare like it might be rigged with electric shocks. The result is drained of any rock-band formalism, all scrap-metal clang and kick-drum thump teetering on collapse." Kiely's deconstructionist lyrics have been said to mirror this approach, consisting of references to both "everyday scenes" & popular culture figures.

Loud and Quiet described the album overall as "Drums Not Dead-era Liars flipped on its head." According to AllMusic, the band incorporates elements of techno music more directly (in comparison to their past work) on tracks such as "Akineton" & "Prefab Castle" (the album's "tumultuous seven-minute climax"), the latter of which features an outro that has been compared to Jon Hopkins. The track "Shoulderblades" is more industrial-influenced while “Couch Combover” "builds into a seasick, distortion-soaked stomp" where Kiely "sounds like [he] is puking and crying at the same time." The track "Laggard" features "self-destruct siren synths, distant dinosaur screams and erratic, tumbling drums" and has been described as terrifying. Kiely's vocals on "Going Norway" have been compared to Mark E. Smith, its flangered guitars described as "stabbing".

== Release ==
The Talkies was released on the 17th of October 2019 through Rough Trade Records on both LP and CD. Three singles were released from the album. "Shoulderblades", the first one, was accompanied by a video (directed by Bob Gallagher) featuring dancer Oona Doherty "interpret[ing the song] into erratic body movements as the frames switch from blue to red, and back again." The second single, "Going Norway", was released with another video from the same director, described as "a folk-horror film staged in the therapist’s office. The whole thing feels like a rorschach test gone terribly, terribly wrong." The final single "Salmon of Knowledge" was released over a month before the album.

The album's release was accompanied by a sold-out tour across the U.S.' east coast & Europe over October & November. Recordings from a pair of live shows from the tour, performed at Vicar Street in Dublin, were released as the Vicar Street Live LP (titled Live at Vicar Street for its digital release) by Rough Trade Records on the 29th of August, 2020.

== Reception ==
Professional ratings
Aggregate scores
Source	Rating
AnyDecentMusic?	7.9/10
Metacritic	81/100
Review scores
Source	Rating
AllMusic	4/5 stars
Clash	8/10
DIY	4.5/5 stars
Exclaim!	7/10
The Guardian	4/5 stars
The Irish Times	5/5 stars
The Line of Best Fit	9.5/10
NME	4/5 stars
Pitchfork	8.0/10
The Skinny	4/5 stars

The album received critical acclaim according to Metacritic, where it has a weighted score of 81/100 based on 15 reviews. On AnyDecentMusic?, the album scored 7.9/10 based on 18 reviews.

AllMusic called the album "captivating" & described it as "half-noise rock record and half-audio representation of Kiely's mind." The Irish Times gave the album a perfect score, hailing it as a "raucous, idiosyncratic return". "There’s so much eating and drinking in this album," the review concludes, "that multiple listens simply won’t suffice; it may take forever to untangle. There’s no question that it won’t be to everyone’s taste, but it is a record that will swallow you up before you even realise it." The Line of Best Fit named it their album of the week & called it "a devastating and jaw-dropping record that provokes awe and anxiety in equal measure. Although there are elements throughout the record that are ‘quintessentially’ Girl Band, The Talkies builds upon these elements and makes a vast leap sonically and narratively with the aid of unrestrained experimentation. There is a definitive artistic expression found on The Talkies and frankly it should be a late contender for any albums of the decade list." "No one does what these guys do," wrote DIY in their similarly positive review of the album, "probably no one could, and it’s probably not something that you’d dream up if no one else was. That’s what makes it so exciting; not only that they can, but they do it so well." According to NME: "It’s rare you see an album that packs such fresh musical experimentation, sounds so singular and yet has the self-awareness and lightheartedness to name. [...] Weirder, funnier and fiercer than ever, Girl Band return as heroes of the weirder corner of rock music, and they’ve outdone themselves this time."

In a slightly less positive review, Exclaim! noted that the album's "unsettling vibe" "works better on some tracks more than others. "Shoulderblades" has a gradual descent into an earth-shattering experimental breakdown, not unlike something you'd hear from Death Grips, but the immensity and impressiveness of its industrial buildup puts that of the following track, "Couch Combover," to comparative shame." The Guardian's review was mixed, calling the album "true haunted-house horror" & an "intentionally stressful listen".

=== Accolades ===
In addition the ones below, the album notably placed #1 on The Irish Times' 2020 list of the "50 best Irish albums of all time", who hailed it as "a project that dismantles the idea of what pop should be and rebuilds it from the ground up. Drawing on a sojourn in a creepy house in County Laois and recorded in the shadow of singer Dara Kiely’s mental health experiences it is spellbindingly baroque - a brutal, mesmerising tour de force".

Year-end accolades for The Talkies
Publication	Country	Accolade	Rank
Les Inrockuptibles	France	Top 100 Best Albums of 2019	31
Nothing but Hope and Passion	Germany	50 Best Albums Of 2019	27
The Irish Times	Ireland	The best music of 2019	4
Crack Magazine	UK	The Top 50 Albums of the Year	27
The Line of Best Fit	UK	The Best Albums of 2019	46
Louder Than War	UK	Albums of The Year 2019 – the Top 50	3
Paste	US	The 20 Best Punk Albums of 2019	20
Stereogum	US	The 50 Best Albums Of 2020	48
Under the Radar	US	Top 100 Albums of 2019	50

== Track listing ==
All tracks are written by Gilla Band.

No.	Title	Length
1.	"Prolix"	1:49
2.	"Going Norway"	4:13
3.	"Shoulderblades"	6:06
4.	"Couch Combover"	3:34
5.	"Aibohphobia"	2:41
6.	"Salmon of Knowledge"	6:20
7.	"Akineton"	1:46
8.	"Amygdala"	1:43
9.	"Caveat"	2:47
10.	"Laggard"	5:56
11.	"Prefab Castle"	7:38
12.	"Ereignis"	1:36
Total length:		45:39

== Personnel ==
=== Gilla Band ===
- Dara Kiely - vocals
- Alan Duggan - guitar
- Daniel Fox - bass, engineering, mixing
- Adam Faulkner - drums

The liner notes credit the band as both the primary artist & producer.

=== Additional Credits ===
Adapted from AllMusic:

- James Hyland - engineering, mixing
- Jake Lummus - engineering
- Liam Mulvaney - engineering
- Gintas Norvila - engineering
- Robert Scanlon - photography
- Damien Tran - artwork

== Charts ==
Chart performance for The Talkies
Chart (2019)	Peak position
Irish Albums (Official Charts)	11
Scottish Albums (Official Charts)	32
UK Albums (Official Charts)	73
UK Album Downloads (Official Charts)	90
UK Independent Albums (Official Charts)	10
