= Gilla Band =

Irish post-punk band

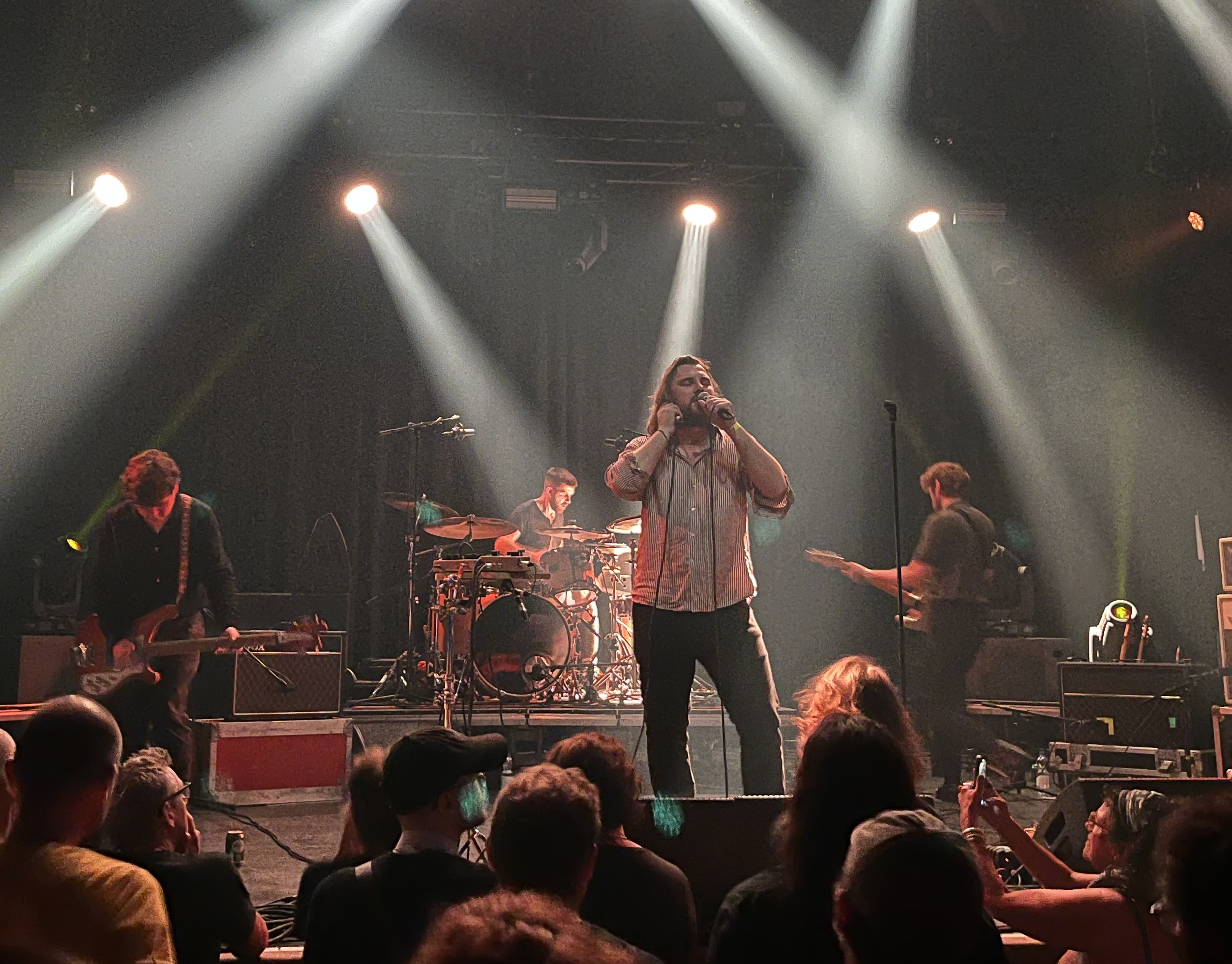
- Gilla Band at Paard van Troje in 2023

Background information
- Also known as: Girl Band (2011–2021)
- Origin: Dublin, Ireland
- Genres: Post-punk; noise rock; indie rock
- Years active: 2011–present
- Labels: Any Other City; Rough Trade
- Members: Dara Kiely; Alan Duggan; Daniel Fox; Adam Faulkner
- Website: gillaband.com

Gilla Band (formerly Girl Band) are an Irish post-punk and noise rock band from Dublin. They were founded in 2011 and comprises vocalist Dara Kiely, guitarist Alan Duggan, bassist Daniel Fox, and drummer Adam Faulkner.

Their career began with the 2012 single "In My Head", followed by the track "You're a Dog", which led to them developing live followings in both Ireland and the UK, and a recording contract with Rough Trade in 2015. That year The Irish Times described them as "the most fascinating act out of these parts at present...[who make] thrilling, menacing, exciting noise".

To date they have released a series of singles and EPs, the critically acclaimed album Holding Hands with Jamie (2015), after a gap in 2016-7 due to health issues, the techno- and glam-influenced The Talkies (2019), and then Most Normal (2022).

== History ==
=== Early years ===
The band was formed in Dublin in July 2011 by vocalist Dara Kiely, guitarist Alan Duggan, bassist Daniel Fox and drummer Adam Faulkner. Duggan, Kiely and Fox had played in the indie rock band Harrows. Harrows formed when the members were in secondary school at the age of 16 and was described by Kiely and Fox as "a shit version of the Strokes". They did not sign to a record label whilst active and have uploaded what few songs they had recorded to YouTube and Myspace. They originally took the name Girl Band in reference to a girl they'd met at a bar, as a play on how they believed her music taste was boring because she liked the Wombats.

In April 2012 they released their debut single "In My Head" on Any Other City Records. They self-financed a music video for the track "Leave Again". Kiely played drums in Harrows and it was not until after Harrows disbanded that he attempted singing.

The band followed the single with the self-produced France 98 EP which was recorded live and released through Any Other City. They then recorded a cover of "Why They Hide Their Bodies Under My Garage?" by techno artist Blawan, which furthered their reputation and expanded their fan base, setting them up for a handful of UK tour dates throughout April 2013.

=== Rough Trade ===
Girl Band released a number of limited 7" singles throughout 2014 on Any Other City records, and in December 2014 signed to Rough Trade Records. The record deal came about after the founder of the label, Geoff Travis saw them perform numerous times, and he wanted to "facilitate what [the band was] doing [at the time] on a bigger scale". They were given full creative control and allowed to produce their own records. They released their self-produced debut album Holding Hands With Jamie on Rough Trade in September 2015.

=== The Talkies ===
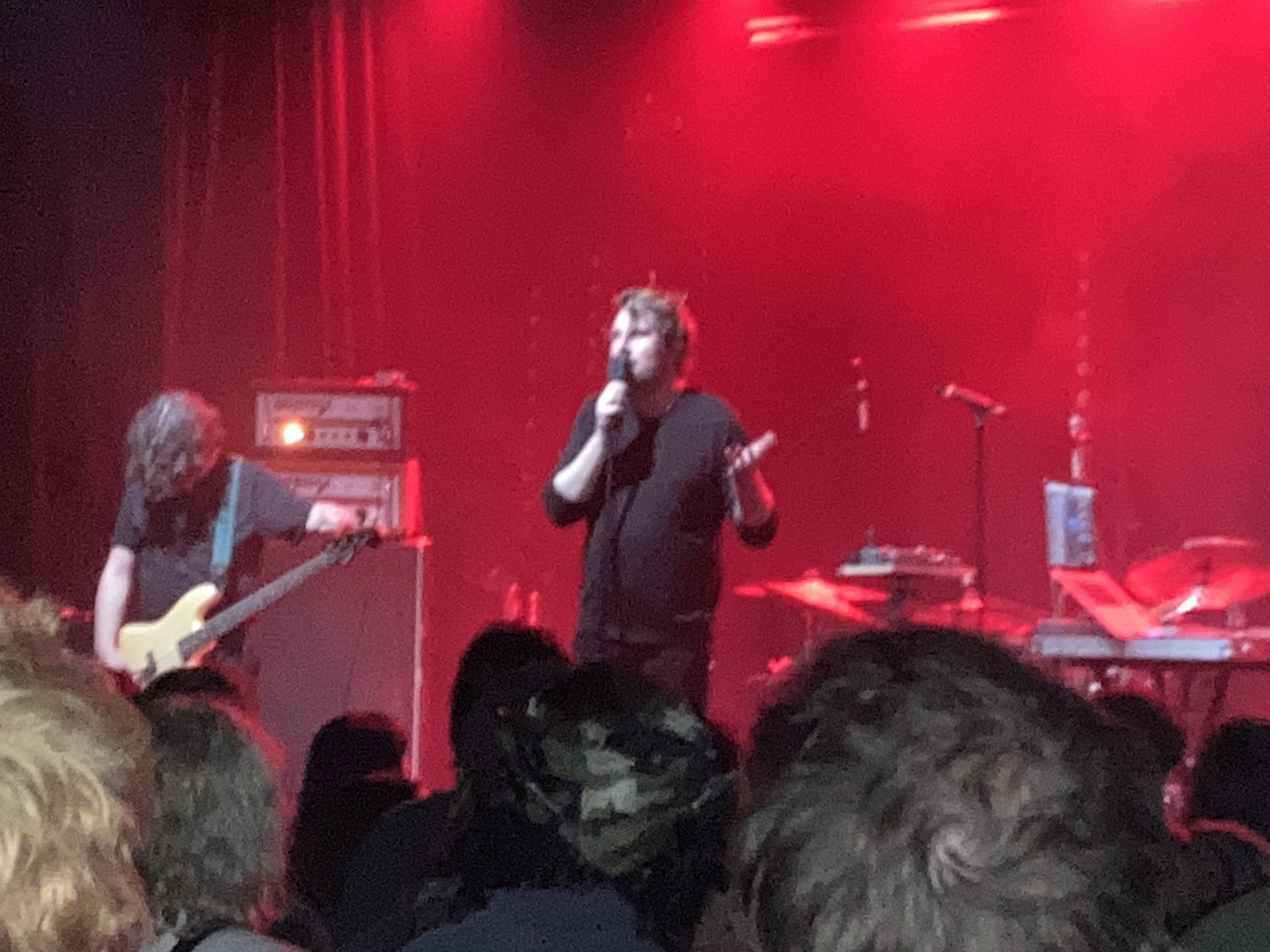
Gilla Band, 2025

In June 2019, Girl Band released "Shoulderblades", their first single in four years. A second single titled "Going Norway" followed in August 2019. The songs are the singles for the band's second album The Talkies, which was released by Rough Trade on 27 September. The album's repetitive and experimental sound is characterized by its unorthodox use of effects-laden guitars, abstract stream of consciousness lyrics and stylistic borrowings from techno & industrial music. Critics have described the album as noise rock & post-punk, with many praising its dark and unsettling tone.

=== Name change and Most Normal ===
In November 2021, the band announced they were changing their name from Girl Band to Gilla Band. The band stated that they changed their name because it was a "misgendered name" and that their former name could have been "propagating a culture of non-inclusivity."

On October 7, 2022, the band released their next studio album, Most Normal, and embarked on their first full US tour in support of the record.

In May 2026, the band announced a North American and European tour and shared "Giraffe" as the first single for their album Pugnello, which released on September 25, 2026.

== Style ==
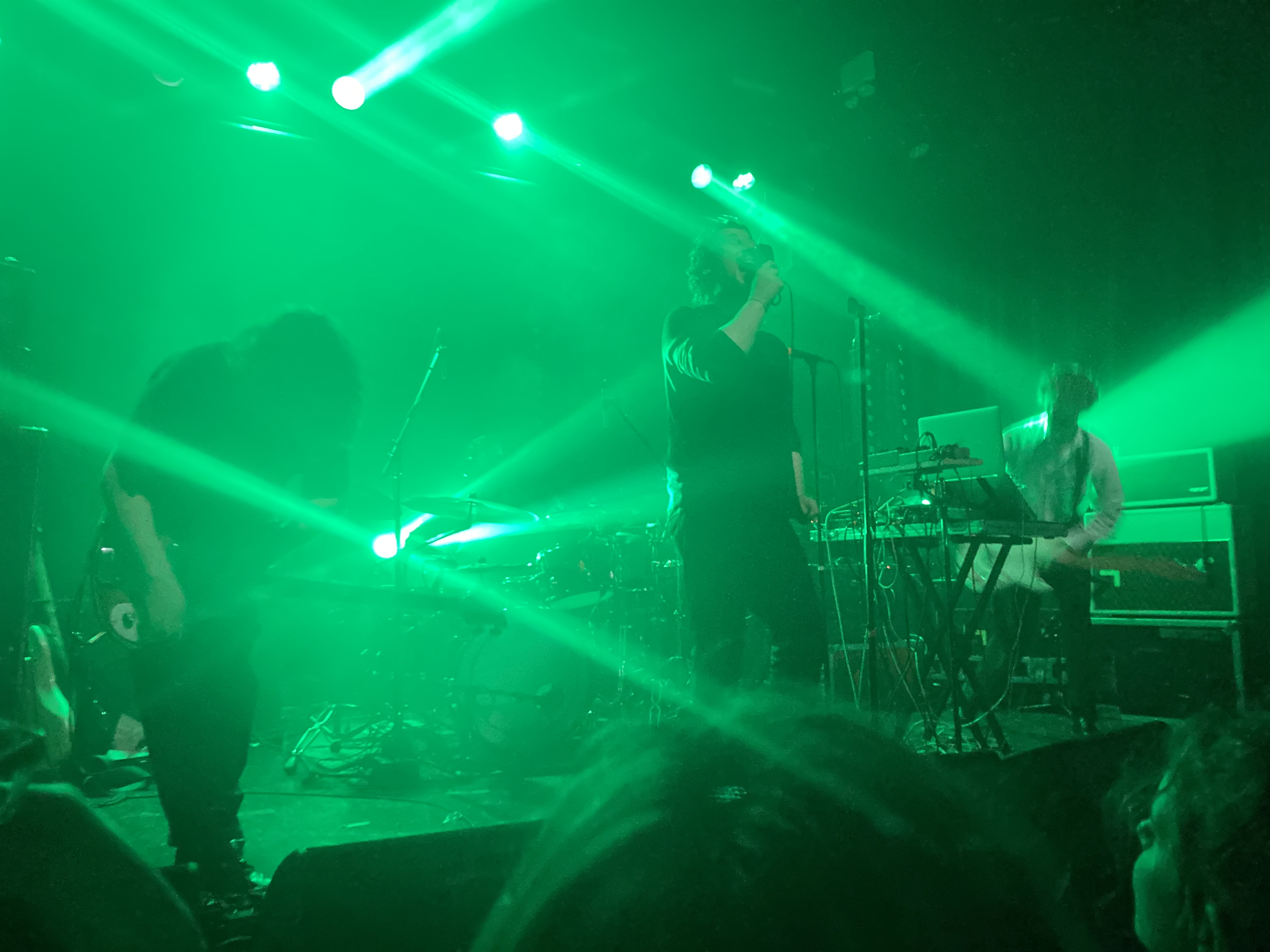
Gilla Band live, October 2025

The band's debut album was well received by music critics. Pitchfork said that "Dara Kiely brings heavy vibes and great songs to Girl Band's new album. Should you laugh? Holding Hands With Jamie is as discomfiting as Kiely’s mental state". The Guardian described the band as "full of sound and fury" and stated "This Irish four-piece howls at you from the very start, an unbroken series of thumping, crashing songs strewn with fractured, imagistic lyrics".

Rolling Stone wrote than Kiely's vocal performance "sure sounds convincing. But he doesn't seem too shy about it, either – less like someone cowering embarrassedly in his room than a guy who's turned his fish-belly skin and concave abs into a creepy point of pride. That kind of confrontational, matter-of-fact ugliness is what this Irish post-punk crew does so well, torturing their instruments with dead-eyed precision and diabolical resolve. The dank, relentless music sounds like it was recorded in a meat locker under a fallout shelter". Rolling Stone compared the band to Liars and Nick Cave's Birthday Party.

=== Influences ===
Drummer Adam Faulkner has said that "most of the bands we get compared to we don’t really listen to. For ages, for like a whole year, we got compared to Mclusky, and none of us ever listened to it. And then we all did and were just like, Nah, don’t like it." The band's influences include the Fall, Modern Lovers, Beatles, Nirvana, Queens of the Stone Age, Nick Cave and the Bad Seeds, John Cooper Clarke, Leonard Cohen, Oasis, Spice Girls, Pissed Jeans, Ray Price, LCD Soundsystem, Earl Sweatshirt, Bad Brains, James Chance and the Contortions, Neu!, and the Chemical Brothers. The band made a conscious effort to avoid sounding like landfill indie and "to not sound like Radiohead, because there were tonnes of bands in Dublin who were just really bad versions of them."

=== Legacy ===
Gilla Band have been cited as an influence by Idles, Fontaines D.C., the Murder Capital, Dry Cleaning, Goat Girl, Shame, Model/Actriz, Irk, Ditz, Just Mustard and Ekko Astral.

== Band members ==
- Dara Kiely – vocals
- Alan Duggan – guitar
- Daniel Fox – bass guitar
- Adam Faulkner – drums

== Discography ==
=== Studio albums ===
List of studio albums, with selected information
Title	Details	Peak chart positions	
Title	Details	IRE	UK
Holding Hands with Jamie	Released: 25 September 2015; Label: Rough Trade; Formats: CD, LP	11	—
The Talkies	Released: 27 September 2019; Label: Rough Trade; Formats: CD, LP	11	73
Most Normal	Released: 7 October 2022; Label: Rough Trade; Formats: CD, LP	30	—
Pugnello	Released: 25 September 2026; Label: Rough Trade; Formats: CD, LP	34	—

=== EPs ===
List of extended plays, with selected information
Title	EP details
France 98	Released: 11 October 2012; Label: Any Other City; Formats: 12-inch, digital download
The Early Years	Released: 21 April 2015; Label: Rough Trade; Formats: 12-inch, digital download, CD

=== Singles ===
List of singles, with selected information
Title	Year	Album
"In My Head"	2012	Non-album singles (Note: These singles (along with "Why They Hide Their Bodies Under My Garage?") were later compiled on The Early Years in 2015.)
"The Cha Cha Cha"	2014	Non-album singles
"Lawman"	2014	Non-album singles
"De Bom Bom"	2014	Non-album singles
"Pears for Lunch"	2015	Holding Hands with Jamie
"Paul"	2015	Holding Hands with Jamie
"In Plastic"	2016	Holding Hands with Jamie
"Shoulderblades"	2019	The Talkies
"Going Norway"	2019	The Talkies
"Salmon of Knowledge"	2019	The Talkies
"Amygdala" (live at Vicar Street)	2020	Non-album singles
"Shoulder Blades" (live at Vicar Street)	2020	Non-album singles
"Eight Fivers"	2022	Most Normal
"Backwash"	2022	Most Normal
"Post Ryan"	2022	Most Normal
"Sports Day"	2024	Non-album single
"Giraffe"	2026	Pugnello

Music videos

Title	Year	Director(s)
"In My Head"	2012	—
"Lawman"	2014	Second/Frame
"De Bom Bom"	2014	Second/Frame
"Why They Hide Their Bodies Under My Garage?"	2015	Bob Gallagher
"Paul"	2015	Bob Gallagher
"Pears for Lunch"	2015	Bob Gallagher
"In Plastic"	2015	Bob Gallagher
"Shoulderblades"	2019	Bob Gallagher
"Going Norway"	2019	Bob Gallagher

Other appearances

Year	Song	Album	Comments
2013	"Why They Hide Their Bodies Under My Garage?"	Quompilation #3	Cover of a 2012 Blawan song. Later released on The Early Years.
