= The Other Side of Mt. Heart Attack =

Single by Liars

from the album Drum's Not Dead
- B-side: "Do As The Birds, Eat The Remains"
- Released: February 13, 2006
- Genre: Post-punk
- Label: Mute Records

Liars singles chronology
"It Fit When I Was a Kid" (2005)	"The Other Side of Mt. Heart Attack" (2006)	"How Many More Times" (2006)

"The Other Side of Mt. Heart Attack" is the second single for the Drum's Not Dead LP by Liars. Pitchfork Media declared it the 46th best song of 2006. It was also included in the 2008 book The Pitchfork 500: Our Guide to the Greatest Songs from Punk to the Present, a list of the best songs released since 1977. This song was used on the soundtracks for the films The Nines, Deadgirl, 50/50 and Pop Skull.

== CD track listing ==
1. "The Other Side of Mt. Heart Attack" (single mix)
2. "The Other Side of Mt. Heart Attack" (album version)
3. "Do As The Birds, Eat The Remains"
4. "Drum And The Uncomfortable Can" (Liars remix)

Bonus Videos:

1. "The Other Side of Mt. Heart Attack" (single mix)
2. "The Other Side of Mt. Heart Attack" (album mix)
3. "Do As The Birds, Eat The Remains"
4. "Drum And The Uncomfortable Can" (Liars remix)

== Vinyl track list ==
1. The Other Side of Mt. Heart Attack (single mix)
2. The Other Side of Mt. Heart Attack (album mix)
