= It Fit When I Was a Kid =

EP by Liars
- Released: November 21, 2005
- Genre: Indie rock
- Label: Mute Records

Liars chronology
We Fenced Other Gardens With the Bones of Our Own (2004)	It Fit When I Was a Kid (2005)	The Other Side of Mt. Heart Attack (2006)

It Fit When I Was a Kid is the first EP for the Drum's Not Dead LP by Liars. It was the subject of some controversy when the original cover of the single was substituted for the censored version of the original. A special edition release featuring the original artwork is planned. The official vinyl release was limited to 500 copies. The song was remixed by Crystal Castles and is available online.
