= They Were Wrong, So We Drowned =

Studio album by Liars
- Released: February 24, 2004
- Recorded: May 2003
- Genres: Noise rock; experimental rock; dance-punk
- Length: 40:42
- Label: Mute Records
- Producers: David Sitek, Liars

Liars chronology
Fins to Make Us More Fish-Like (2002)	They Were Wrong, So We Drowned (2004)	Drum's Not Dead (2006)

Professional ratings
Aggregate scores
Source	Rating
Metacritic	64/100
Review scores
Source	Rating
AllMusic	4/5 stars
Alternative Press	3/5
Entertainment Weekly	B+
Mojo	3/5 stars
NME	6/10
Pitchfork	6.3/10
Q	4/5 stars
Rolling Stone	1/5 stars
Spin	F
Uncut	3/5 stars

They Were Wrong, So We Drowned is the second album by noise rock band Liars, released in 2004.

The album is considered a massive departure from the post-punk-inspired style of their debut They Threw Us All in a Trench and Stuck a Monument on Top, exploring a more freeform, tribal sound. The album takes the form of a very loose concept album concerning witchcraft upon The Brocken (a mountain) during Walpurgis Night, and tales of witch trials in the area around the Harz Mountains in Germany. The recording coincided with the band's relocation from Williamsburg, Brooklyn to the woods of rural New Jersey, which also inspired the initial direction of the album.

The focus upon the Brocken legends came when one of the band members mistakenly entered "Brocken Witch" into a search engine while researching the first song's title (called "Broken Witch" at the time).

The artwork for the "We Fenced Other Gardens with the Bones of Our Own" single resulted in the band's eponymous creepypasta.

The album was included in the book 1001 Albums You Must Hear Before You Die.

== Track listing ==
1. "Broken Witch" – 6:10
2. "Steam Rose from the Lifeless Cloak" – 2:49
3. "There's Always Room on the Broom" – 3:05
4. "If You're a Wizard Then Why Do You Wear Glasses?" – 2:11
5. "We Fenced Other Gardens with the Bones of Our Own" – 5:28
6. "They Don't Want Your Corn, They Want Your Kids" – 2:38
7. "Read the Book That Wrote Itself" – 3:09
8. "Hold Hands and It Will Happen Anyway" – 4:51
9. "They Took 14 for the Rest of Our Lives" – 4:09
10. "Flow My Tears, the Spider Said" – 6:12

== Personnel ==
- Angus Andrew - vocals, additional effects, additional synthesizers
- Aaron Hemphill - vocals, mixer, guitar, effects, samples, percussion, synthesizers
- Julian Gross - drums
