= Fins to Make Us More Fish-Like =

EP by Liars
- Released: July 9, 2002
- Genres: Dance-punk, alternative rock, post-punk revival
- Length: 11:40
- Label: Mute Records

Liars chronology
| They Threw Us All in a Trench and Stuck a Monument on Top (2002) | Fins to Make Us More Fish-Like (2002) | They Were Wrong, So We Drowned (2004) |

Professional ratings
Review scores
| Source | Rating |
|---|---|
| AllMusic | 3.5/5 stars |
| Drowned in Sound | 8/10 |
| Pitchfork | 8.8/10 |
| PopMatters | (positive) |
| The Village Voice | (dud) |

Fins to Make Us More Fish-Like is an EP by post-punk band Liars. It was released on July 9, 2002 on Mute Records' subsidiary Blast First, then on November 12 later that year on Mute itself, both as a 10" and as a CD. The first two songs are originals and the third is a more raw version of the opening track of their debut album, They Threw Us All in a Trench and Stuck a Monument on Top.

== Track listing ==
1. Pillars Were Hollow and Filled With Candy, So We Tore Them Down
2. Every Day Is a Child With Teeth
3. Grown Men Don't Fall in the River, Just Like That
