= Karenn =

Karenn is a collaboration between electronic dance music artists Blawan and Pariah, which uses only analogue hardware to perform and create tracks. It was formed in 2011 after the two artists met through DJing at events and releasing records on the same label, R&S Records. They set up their own label to release their music called Works The Long Nights.

After a break of five years, Karenn reunited in 2019 to release the Kind Of Green EP on their new label Voam. Their debut album was written in Berlin during the European summer of 2019 and released the following November. It is called Grapefruit Regret and has eight tracks. In contrast to previous recordings, Karenn used a drum machine. In 2020, Voam released a 12" called Music Sounds Better With Shoe by Karenn which features an A-side first heard in their 2014 Boiler Room set. As of 2020, Karenn's live setup consisted of a Boss RC-505 looper, an Eventide Timefactor delay pedal, an EHX Bad Stone phaser pedal, an Elektron Digitone synthesiser and a Strymon Deco saturation pedal.
