= Mess (Liars album) =

Studio album by Liars
- Released: 24 March 2014
- Recorded: No Gold Studios, Los Angeles, US
- Genres: Alternative dance, dance-punk; electronica
- Length: 55:11
- Label: Mute
- Producer: Angus Andrew

Liars chronology
WIXIW (2012)	Mess (2014)	TFCF (2017)

Singles from Mess
- 1. "Mess on a Mission" Released: 17 March 2014; 2. "Pro Anti Anti" Released: 27 June 2014; 3. "I'm No Gold" Released: 3 November 2014

Professional ratings
Aggregate scores
Source	Rating
Metacritic	75/100
Review scores
Source	Rating
Consequence of Sound	C
Drowned In Sound	(8/10)
NME	(8/10)
Pitchfork	(6.9/10)
Rolling Stone	3.5/5 stars
Tiny Mix Tapes	2.5/5 marks

Mess is the seventh studio album by music trio Liars, released on Mute Records on 24/25 March 2014. In a press release, singer Angus Andrew said the recording process had been "almost the exact opposite" of creating their last album WIXIW and that "instead of being doubtful, work on the new album has been immediate, fun, instinctual and confident". The record was largely recorded at the band's own No Gold Studios in Los Angeles.

The first single from the album, "Mess On A Mission", was released on 17 March, backed with remixes from Silent Servant, SFV Acid, Black Bananas (Jennifer Herrema) and Nest Of Teens. Regarding the single, a Mute press release quotes the band: "Mess On A Mission acknowledges some of the modern day issues of uncertainty, of being overwhelmed with possibilities, too many choices and it vocalises them. It's cathartic and a more positive spin on something our music has always dealt with: anxiety."

Mess is the last studio album by Liars to feature long-standing members Julian Gross and Aaron Hemphill, who left the group in 2014 and 2017 respectively.

== Track listing ==
All tracks are written by Aaron Hemphill and Angus Andrew.

No.	Title	Length
1.	"Mask Maker"	4:07
2.	"Vox Tuned D.E.D."	4:31
3.	"I'm No Gold"	6:10
4.	"Pro Anti Anti"	4:16
5.	"Can't Hear Well"	3:26
6.	"Mess on a Mission"	4:05
7.	"Darkslide"	3:51
8.	"Boyzone"	4:41
9.	"Dress Walker"	4:01
10.	"Perpetual Village"	8:57
11.	"Left Speaker Blown"	6:59
