= Wet Will Always Dry =

Studio album by Blawan
- Released: 18 June 2018
- Genre: Techno
- Length: 50:10
- Label: Ternesc

Blawan chronology
Wet Will Always Dry (2018)	SickElixir (2025)

Wet Will Always Dry is the debut studio album by English DJ and record producer Jamie Roberts under the pseudonym Blawan. It was released on 18 June 2018 through Ternesc. It received generally favorable reviews from critics.

== Background ==
Jamie Roberts, also known as Blawan, is an English DJ and record producer from South Yorkshire. Wet Will Always Dry is his debut studio album. It is his first release since the Nutrition EP (2017). It was released on 18 June 2018 through his record label Ternesc.

== Critical reception ==
Professional ratings
Aggregate scores
Source	Rating
Metacritic	80/100
Review scores
Source	Rating
The 405	7/10
AllMusic	4/5 stars
Crack	6/10
Pitchfork	7.2/10
Resident Advisor	4.1/5

According to the review aggregator Metacritic, Wet Will Always Dry received "generally favorable reviews" based on a weighted average score of 80 out of 100 from 6 critic scores.

Ryan Keeling of Resident Advisor stated, "As Wet Will Always Dry proves, Blawan has pushed things forward by showing that the traditional techno template can still be sculpted in surprising new forms." Paul Simpson of AllMusic called it "yet more proof that he's one of the decade's greatest techno producers" and "Undoubtedly one of the best techno albums of 2018." Meanwhile, Thomas Frost of Crack wrote, "As a whole, Wet Will Always Dry stays true to the textures Blawan craves, but doesn't necessarily translate into a cohesive statement, feeling more akin to a punchy collection of well-produced Blawan tracks than any kind of journey."

=== Accolades ===
Year-end lists for Wet Will Always Dry
Publication	List	Rank	Ref.
AllMusic	Favorite Electronic Albums	—	
DJ Mag	DJ Mag's Top 50 Albums of 2018	17	
The Quietus	Quietus Albums of the Year 2018	19	
Resident Advisor	2018's Best Albums	—	
The Vinyl Factory	Our 50 Favourite Albums of 2018	15	

== Track listing ==
Wet Will Always Dry track listing
No.	Title	Length
1.	"Klade"	5:32
2.	"Careless"	6:02
3.	"Tasser"	6:21
4.	"Vented"	7:00
5.	"North"	6:23
6.	"Stell"	6:09
7.	"Kalosi"	6:51
8.	"Nims"	5:50
Total length:		50:10
