= Pugnello =

Studio album by Gilla Band
- Released: 25 September 2026
- Recorded: 2022–2026
- Studios: Hellfire (Dublin); Sonic Studios (Dublin); Yellow Door Music Studio (Dublin)
- Length: 42:16
- Label: Rough Trade
- Producer: Gilla Band

Gilla Band chronology
Most Normal (2022)	Pugnello (2026)

Singles from Pugnello
- 1. "Giraffe" Released: 27 May 2026; 2. "Placeholder" Released: 7 July 2026; 3. "Alogia" Released: 8 September 2026

Pugnello is the fourth studio album by Irish noise rock band Gilla Band, released on 25 September 2026 through Rough Trade Records. It is the band's first studio album in four years, following Most Normal (2022). The album was produced by the band and recorded and mixed by bassist Daniel Fox.

== Background and promotion ==
Following the release of Most Normal in 2022, the band members focused on their individual projects and endeavours. Pugnello was recorded over four years, from 2022 to 2026, across three studios in Dublin: Hellfire, Yellow Door Music Studio and Sonic Studios. The album was produced by the band alongside bassist Daniel Fox. The band returned with their first original material in over three years on 27 May 2026, releasing the lead single "Giraffe". The album was announced on 7 July 2026, alongside the release of its second single, "Placeholder", which draws on frontman Dara Kiely's childhood memories and their influence on his life today. The third single, "Alogia", was released on 8 September 2026 and addresses Kiely's diagnosis of schizophrenia. The accompanying tour spans North America in autumn 2026, followed by Europe and the United Kingdom in early 2027, with dates commencing on 14 October 2026.

== Critical reception ==
Pugnello ratings
Aggregate scores
Source	Rating
Any Decent Music	8.4/10
Metacritic	85/100
Review scores
Source	Rating
AllMusic	4.5/5 stars
DIY	4.5/5 stars
The Guardian	5/5 stars
The Line of Best Fit	7/10
Mojo	3/5 stars
MusicOMH	4.5/5 stars
Paste	B+
Pitchfork	8.8/10
Uncut	4/5 stars
Under the Radar	7.5/10

Any Decent Music gave the album a weighted average score of 8.4 out of 10 from 20 critic scores. According to the review aggregator Metacritic, Pugnello received "universal acclaim" based on a weighted average score of 85 out of 100 from 15 critic scores.

In a five-star review for The Guardian, Alexis Petridis argued that much of the album's appeal stemmed from its ability to drag "the listener headlong through sudden shifts in tone and volume". He compared its sound to the "punishing, industrial-flecked techno" associated with artists such as Regis and Surgeon. Awarding the album the "Best New Music" accolade, Madison Bloom of Pitchfork praised Gilla Band for understanding the physical impact of their music, highlighting the album's "maximum discord". Bloom concluded that Pugnello was the "most methodical and charged album" the group had made to date.

A. L. Noonan at DIY described the album as "their fiercest, most ruminative release", noting how the band transformed its signature sound to its "root materials". Noonan identified its themes as "reflection, grief, distraction and childhood". John Murphy of MusicOMH found the album "not particularly accessible", suggesting that listeners' enjoyment depended on how much "ear-bleeding noise and anxiety-inducing sonic turmoil and confusion" they could tolerate. John Amen of Pop Matters wrote that Pugnello "shows Gilla Band navigating darkly comedic cum fatalistic gestalts more seamlessly, reveling in tableaux that point to both high-brow and tortured-slacker sensibilities".

In a less favorable review, Mojo described the album's sound as "earhole-scouring noise" that was not for "everyone", but suggested that it could appeal to listeners with an appetite for such music, allowing them to "scratch 'til you bleed". Joshua Mills of The Line of Best Fit questioned the band's future, wondering how much further they could "strip away" their sound before it ceased to be music, though he considered this prospect "a great deal more interesting" than the output of other bands.

== Track listing ==
All tracks are written by Dara Kiely, Alan Duggan, Daniel Fox, and Adam Faulkner.

Pugnello track listing
No.	Title	Length
1.	"The Angelus"	3:30
2.	"Placeholder"	4:14
3.	"Alogia"	3:24
4.	"Three Hands Clapping"	2:08
5.	"Jacobsons"	4:38
6.	"The Megazord"	5:28
7.	"Computer Sadness"	3:44
8.	"Giraffe"	4:28
9.	"Crisp Pop"	7:42
10.	"At the Gallop"	3:00
Total length:		42:16

== Personnel ==
Credits adapted from the album's official release listing and contemporary coverage.

=== Gilla Band ===
- Dara Kiely – vocals
- Alan Duggan Borges – guitar
- Daniel Fox – bass
- Adam Faulkner – drums

=== Production ===
- Gilla Band – production
- Daniel Fox – recording, mixing

== Charts ==
Chart performance
Chart (2026)	Peak position
French Physical Albums (SNEP)	112
Irish Albums (Official Charts)	34
Scottish Albums (Official Charts)	44
UK Album Downloads (Official Charts)	17
UK Independent Albums (Official Charts)	15
