= WIXIW =

Studio album by Liars
- Released: June 4, 2012
- Recorded: 2011–2012
- Genre: Experimental rock, electronica
- Length: 43:04
- Label: Mute
- Producer: Daniel Miller

Liars chronology
Sisterworld (2010)	WIXIW (2012)	Mess (2014)

Singles from WIXIW
- 1. "No. 1 Against the Rush" Released: 28 May 2012; 2. "Brats" Released: 15 October 2012

WIXIW (pronounced "wish you") is the sixth studio album by experimental rock trio Liars, released on June 4, 2012. It was written in Los Angeles and in a remote cabin in the mountains around the city. Recording took place in Liars' private studio below U.S. Highway 101 in Los Angeles under the guidance of the band's label boss, Daniel Miller. Writing for The Quietus, Luke Turner described WIXIW as the band's "most accessible album to date" as well as their most electronic record ever. Reflecting on WIXIW's themes of longing and doubt, Angus Andrew said "You find that throughout the record, even within single songs, there's this duality of wanting to be close to someone but at the same time being afraid of that and thinking it's best that they leave."

The video for "Brats" by Ian Cheng was the second featured video on Cartoon Network's Adult Swim series Off the Air in the episode "Nature".

== Critical reception ==
Professional ratings
Aggregate scores
Source	Rating
AnyDecentMusic?	8.2/10
Metacritic	81/100
Review scores
Source	Rating
AllMusic	4/5 stars
The A.V. Club	A−
Consequence of Sound	4.5/5 stars
Mojo	4/5 stars
NME	8/10
Pitchfork	7.8/10
Rolling Stone	3.5/5 stars
Slant Magazine	4/5 stars
Spin	8/10
Uncut	7/10

WIXIW was well received by music critics, and garnered a score of 81 on the review site Metacritic, indicating "universal acclaim".

In a review for BBC Music, John Doran called the album an "unqualified success" and suggested Liars' newfound kinship with Aphex Twin and Radiohead circa 1999 established them in a field all their own, while Turner referred to the song Brats as a "juddering drunk punk masterpiece". Journalist Emily Mackay of the NME likened the palindromatic album title to the band pursuing a new creative approach to reconnect with their multi-faceted essential nature.

== Accolades ==
Publication	Rank	Ref
BBC Music	16	
Clash	23	
Consequence of Sound	26	
DIY	1	
Exclaim!	45	
Filter	12	
The Fly	36	
musicOMH	8	
NME	39	
Time Out London	15	
Under the Radar	24	

== Track listing ==
All lyrics are written by Angus Andrew; all music is composed by Liars.

No.	Title	Length
1.	"The Exact Color of Doubt"	4:07
2.	"Octagon"	4:38
3.	"No.1 Against the Rush"	5:10
4.	"A Ring on Every Finger"	3:18
5.	"Ill Valley Prodigies"	2:03
6.	"WIXIW"	6:12
7.	"His and Mine Sensations"	4:40
8.	"Flood to Flood"	3:30
9.	"Who Is the Hunter"	3:47
10.	"Brats"	3:02
11.	"Annual Moon Words"	2:37
