= Liars (Liars album) =

Studio album by Liars
- Released: August 28, 2007
- Recorded: 2007 at Planet Roc, Berlin
- Genre: Experimental rock
- Length: 39:06
- Label: Mute
- Producers: Liars and Jeremy Glover

Liars chronology
Drum's Not Dead (2006)	Liars (2007)	Sisterworld (2010)

Professional ratings
Aggregate scores
Source	Rating
Metacritic	79/100
Review scores
Source	Rating
AllMusic	4.5/5 stars
Drowned in Sound	(9/10)
NME	(8/10)
The Observer	5/5 stars
Pitchfork	(8.5/10)
Rockfeedback	4/5 stars
Spin	3.5/5 stars
Stylus Magazine	B+
Tiny Mix Tapes	2/5 marks

Liars is the fourth studio album by the band Liars, released on August 28, 2007. It was recorded at Planet Roc, Los Angeles and was produced by the band and Jeremy Glover. Influences on the album included OMD, Siouxsie and the Banshees, and the Cure.

Liars was preceded by a week by the single release of "Plaster Casts of Everything". The single release of Plaster Casts was accompanied by a videoclip. The song "Freak Out" was #91 on Rolling Stone's list of the 100 Best Songs of 2007.

"Plaster Casts of Everything" was listed in Pitchfork's "Top 500 songs of the 2000s" at #248.

The track "Leather Prowler" was used as the instrumental for "Leather Head" by Tyler, The Creator for his alternative hip-hop collective OFWGKTA's mixtape Radical.

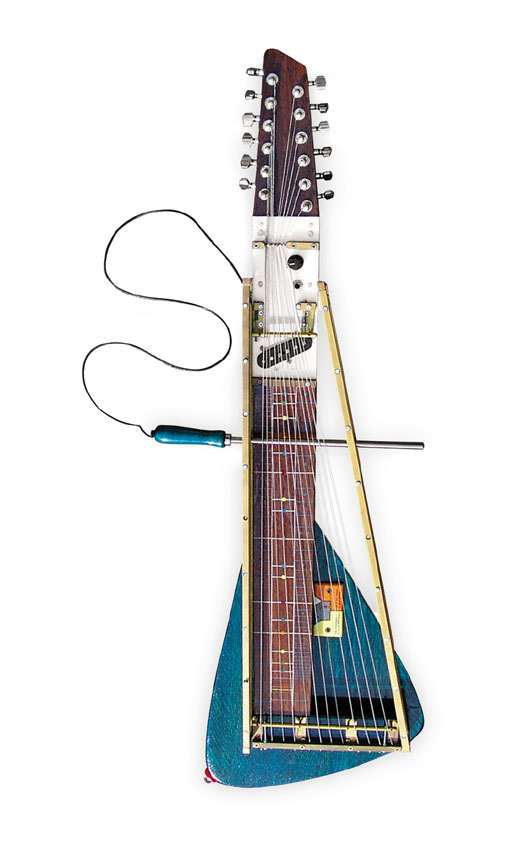
The Moodswinger, built for Aaron Hemphill, used on the track "Leather Prowler"

== Track listing ==
1. "Plaster Casts of Everything" – 3:56
2. "Houseclouds" – 3:21
3. "Leather Prowler" – 4:25
4. "Sailing to Byzantium" – 4:02
5. "What Would They Know" – 3:11
6. "Cycle Time" – 2:16
7. "Freak Out" – 2:30
8. "Pure Unevil" – 3:52
9. "Clear Island" – 2:38
10. "The Dumb in the Rain" – 4:21
11. "Protection" – 4:30

== Personnel ==
Liars

- Angus Andrew – vocals, guitars, backing vocals
- Julian Gross – drums, backing vocals, percussions
- Aaron Hemphill – guitars, synthesizers, programming, backing vocals
- Jeremy Glover – bass (track 4, 6 & 8)

== 'Liars' Session EP ==
On October 24, 2007, four tracks were available for free download from Liars' MySpace page.

The track list is composed of demo versions of the following songs from the album:

1. "Cycle Time" – 2:24
2. "Houseclouds" – 3:27
3. "Pure Unevil" – 3:58
4. "Plaster Casts of Everything" – 4:02
