= Titles with the Word Fountain =

Studio album by Liars
- Released: September 21, 2018
- Genres: Art rock, electronica
- Length: 37:09
- Label: Mute
- Producer: Angus Andrew

Liars chronology
TFCF (2017)	Titles with the Word Fountain (2018)	The Apple Drop (2021)

Singles from TWTWF
- 1. "Murdrum" Released: August 29, 2018

Titles with the Word Fountain (abbreviated as TWTWF) is the ninth studio album by Liars, released on September 21, 2018, by Mute. The album is a follow-up to TFCF and was described as a sequel by sole permanent member Angus Andrew, with the music recorded during the same sessions that resulted in that album.

== Track listing ==
All tracks are written by Angus Andrew.

TWTWF
No.	Title	Length
1.	"97 Tears"	0:51
2.	"Face in Ski Mask Bodies to the Wind"	2:07
3.	"Murdrum"	3:06
4.	"Pure Context"	0:59
5.	"Double Elegy"	2:06
6.	"Left’s Got Power Right Hasn’t"	1:24
7.	"Past Future Split"	1:52
8.	"P/A\M"	1:36
9.	"Fantail Creeps"	1:02
10.	"Perky Cut"	2:40
11.	"Feed the Truth"	3:36
12.	"Gawking at the Accident"	1:51
13.	"Absence Blooms"	2:26
14.	"Extracts from the Seated Sequence"	1:54
15.	"On Giving Up"	2:32
16.	"Sound of Burning Rubbish"	3:28
17.	"A Kind of Stopwatch"	3:46
Total length:		37:09
