= TFCF (album) =

Studio album by Liars
- Released: August 25, 2017
- Studios: Angus Andrew's home studio, Australia
- Genres: Art rock; electronica
- Length: 37:56
- Label: Mute
- Producer: Angus Andrew

Liars chronology
Mess (2014)	TFCF (2017)	Titles with the Word Fountain (2018)

Singles from TFCF
- 1. "Cred Woes" Released: June 29, 2017

TFCF (short for Theme From Crying Fountain) is the eighth studio album by Liars, released on August 25, 2017, through Mute Records. Angus Andrew is the only original member of Liars to feature on the album, following the departures of Julian Gross and Aaron Hemphill in 2014 and 2017 respectively.

Speaking of the process of recording the album, Angus said: "A lot of the sounds I was working on were samples, they lived inside my computer, but I still wanted to have a connection with everything around me. So everything I was recording was in context of the world outside the studio... Sometimes I'd have my headphones on, just listening to the bush, and a bird would fly up and scream into the microphone. The truth is, even in New York or LA, I was still pretty isolated. Here, there are no other people around, but I feel much more connected to the environment around me than in a big city."

On the subject of the cover art, Angus states:

"I've always felt like I was married to my bandmates you know? It's probably a common sentiment. In a band, you enter this nuptial and it's great. You live, breathe, and eat together but now I'm alone without my grooms. That's where I got the idea to be this bride character on my own. That sort of snowballs. I felt like I could've easily made an album cover with the landscape where I recorded it or a crying fountain. That would've been too obvious. This is the kind of creative decision which is scary. Scary creative decisions are the ones that are good!

I was up all sorts of nights thinking to myself "Am I really gonna do this? Oh my God, I'm really gonna do this! Okay, I'm gonna put myself on the cover in a wedding dress!" and you really can't stop it from there. It just takes on its own life."

Professional ratings
Aggregate scores
Source	Rating
Metacritic	69%
Review scores
Source	Rating
AllMusic	4/5 stars
Drowned in Sound	8/10
Exclaim!	8/10
Pitchfork	7.5/10
The Skinny	4/5 stars

== Track listing ==
All tracks are written by Angus Andrew.

TFCF
No.	Title	Length
1.	"The Grand Delusional"	3:35
2.	"Cliché Suite"	3:36
3.	"Staring at Zero"	2:35
4.	"No Help Pamphlet"	3:27
5.	"Face to Face with My Face"	4:25
6.	"Emblems of Another Story"	4:49
7.	"No Tree No Branch"	3:31
8.	"Cred Woes"	3:47
9.	"Coins in My Caged Fist"	3:20
10.	"Ripe Ripe Rot"	2:45
11.	"Crying Fountain"	2:06
Total length:		37:56
