= SickElixir =

Studio album by Blawan
- Released: 10 October 2025
- Genre: Electronic
- Length: 43:53
- Label: XL
- Producer: Jamie Roberts

Blawan chronology
Wet Will Always Dry (2018)	SickElixir (2025)

SickElixir is the second studio album by English DJ and record producer Jamie Roberts under the pseudonym Blawan. It was released on 10 October 2025 through XL Recordings. It received universal acclaim from critics.

== Background ==
Jamie Roberts, also known as Blawan, is an English DJ and record producer from South Yorkshire. He released Wet Will Always Dry in 2018. SickElixir is his second solo studio album. It was created between Berlin, Germany; Leeds, England; Paris, France; and Lisbon, Portugal. It contains 14 tracks. The album was released on 10 October 2025 through XL Recordings.

== Critical reception ==
Professional ratings
Aggregate scores
Source	Rating
Metacritic	82/100
Review scores
Source	Rating
AllMusic	3.5/5 stars
The Guardian	4/5 stars
Pitchfork	8.0/10

According to the review aggregator Metacritic, SickElixir received "universal acclaim" based on a weighted average score of 82 out of 100 from 6 critic scores.

Paul Simpson of AllMusic called SickElixir "the most challenging listen in Blawan's catalog," adding that "it still contains some fascinating material." Alexis Petridis of The Guardian wrote, "It's an album on which the atmosphere is so intense and all-pervading that even the most innocuous sounds take on an ominous air."

=== Accolades ===
Year-end lists for SickElixir
Publication	List	Rank	Ref.
AllMusic	Favorite Electronic Albums	—	
Clash	Albums of the Year 2025	11	
Crack	The Top 50 Albums of 2025	33	
DJ Mag	DJ Mag's Top Albums of 2025	—	
Flood Magazine	The Best Albums of 2025	42	
Pitchfork	The 50 Best Albums of 2025	37	
PopMatters	The 25 Best Electronic Albums of 2025	7	
The Quietus	The Quietus Albums of the Year 2025	5	
The Wire	Releases of the Year (2025 Rewind)	25	

== Track listing ==
All tracks are written by Jamie Roberts, except "Rabbit Hole" and "Casch" by Roberts and Chantal Saroldi.

SickElixir track listing
No.	Title	Length
1.	"The GL Lights"	3:08
2.	"NOS"	3:02
3.	"Weirdos United"	3:17
4.	"Rabbit Hole" (featuring Monstera Black)	3:13
5.	"WTF"	2:39
6.	"Casch"	2:24
7.	"Birf Song"	2:41
8.	"During Elevation"	2:14
9.	"Don't Worry We Happy"	3:30
10.	"Style Teef"	4:18
11.	"Sonkind"	2:34
12.	"TCP Burn"	2:38
13.	"Creature Brigade"	3:17
14.	"SickElixir"	4:56
Total length:		43:53

== Personnel ==
Credits adapted from liner notes.

- Jamie Roberts – production, mixing
- Matt Colton – mastering
- William Aspden – executive production
- Ricardo Cases – photography
- Jake Simmonds – design
- Texas Maragh – design

== Charts ==
Chart performance for SickElixir
Chart (2025)	Peak position
Scottish Albums (Official Charts)	91
UK Album Downloads (Official Charts)	16
UK Dance Albums (Official Charts)	2
UK Independent Albums (Official Charts)	27
