= Why They Hide Their Bodies Under My Garage? =

2012 song by Blawan

Song by Blawan

from the EP His He She & She
- B-side: "His Money", "And Both His Sons", "His Daughters"
- Released: 25 August 2012
- Genre: Techno, industrial techno
- Length: 6:04
- Label: Hinge Finger
- Songwriter: Jamie Roberts
- Producer: Jamie Roberts

"Why They Hide Their Bodies Under My Garage?" is a song by the English DJ and techno music producer Blawan (Jamie Roberts) on 25 August 2012 as the lead single on the four track EP His He She & She on Hinge Finger records. It became an underground dance music hit, regarded for its heavy 4/4 bass-drum beat, minimalist instrumentation and its prominent vocal line sampled from a 1996 Fugees song.

Before the track became critically and commercially successful, Roberts was a respected but low-key producer slowly building an underground reputation. He worried about being type-cast when the track became a hit, and largely withdrew from live performances and recording over the following three years.

The song was covered in 2015 by the Irish post-punk group Gilla Band.

== Composition ==
The looped vocal line is sampled from Fugees's 1996 song "How Many Mics", which is repeated every eight bars, and acts as the track's main hook. In the Fugees song, Pras' sings "Squash your squad and hide their bodies under my garage"; the opening words are truncated in the Blawan track so that it sounds like "Why they...". Roberts says he began the project with a sample from one of his mother's favorite albums, The Score, and that thus the track began in a tongue-in-cheek manner. However, he adjusted the vocal to give it a more "gravelly" and dark sound, which the music critic Philip Sherburne describes as going "way beyond [a] vaguely spooky affect".

While Roberts approached the Fugees' sample in a light-hearted manner, his final sound is abrasive, murky and dark, coinciding with the tone of his previous work. It is dominated by a heavy bass drum, and a series of highly modulated sound effects, which he said aimed to create a "weird" and edgy soundscape.

The first of the His He She & She EP's three B-sides, "His Money", also samples a line from "How Many Mics" and employs a similar bass heavy and consistent 4/4 beat.

== Release ==
It became Blawan's best selling track to that point; until then he had been a low-key, underground UK bass and dubstep producer, whose best known track was the white label "Getting Me Down". "Why They Hide Their Bodies Under My Garage" became an unexpected international club anthem in late 2012 and early 2013, and copies quickly sold out. As its popularity spread, it attracted praise from a diverse range of dance music producers, including Jeff Mills, Boddika and Skrillex.

Daunted by the commercial success and media attention, Blawan gradually withdrew from performing live, and did not release another record until 2015's "Hanging Out The Birds". Explaining his reasons for withdrawing, he said in 2018 that "all of the attention focused on the track was highlighting where my career could end up going if I wasn't careful. It felt like I'd lost control of the reins... It some ways it was a horrible time but I'm also glad it happened in a way because it allowed me to step back and think about where I was going with my music."

== Remixes ==
Reacting to the song's popularity, American electronic dance music DJ Skrillex released a high energy remix version of the track. Skrillex's version was maligned by fans, critics, and Roberts himself. Doran described it as an "unwanted and point-missing bells and whistles remix", while Roberts became deeply uneasy with an act he did not want to be associated with, and began to view the track as seriously compromising his credibility.

Blawan's original track was sampled by English beatboxer Reeps One in 2015.

== Gilla Band version ==
"Why They Hide Their Bodies Under My Garage?"

Single by Gilla Band

from the album The Early Years
- Released: 2015
- Genre: Post-punk, noise-rock
- Label: Rough Trade

The song was covered in 2015 by Irish post-punk and noise rock group Gilla Band. It was released as the lead single for their 5-track EP The Early Years on Rough Trade Records. Noting the rarity that rock bands cover techno music songs, Otis Hart of NPR observed that while the Blawan track is based around a repeating sample and constant beat for over 6 minutes, Gilla Band's eight minute cover version slowly builds dynamics and tension until it climaxes half-ways through with a burst of distorted guitars.

=== Music video ===
The single was accompanied by a music video directed by Irish filmmaker Bob Gallagher. The video opens with a mortician (played by Brendan Conroy) preparing to eat lunch, before a cadaver is delivered to his office for autopsy. The mortician randomly sings and dances along during the autopsy, oblivious that his subject is showing supernatural signs of life. As the song climaxes, the reanimated man rises and begins dancing in a frenzy, as does the terrified mortician. The man then collapses in the mortician's arms, and is wheeled away as the mortician returns to his lunch.

As of April 2021, the video is deemed as adult content by YouTube, and requires registration to view.
