= Most Normal =

Studio album by Gilla Band
- Released: 7 October 2022
- Studio: Sonic Studios
- Genres: Noise rock; post-punk
- Length: 36:41
- Label: Rough Trade
- Producer: Daniel Fox

Gilla Band chronology
The Talkies (2019)	Most Normal (2022)	Pugnello (2026)

Singles from Most Normal

Most Normal is the third studio album by the Irish post-punk and noise rock band Gilla Band, released in 2022 on Rough Trade Records. It was their first release since changing their name from Girl Band.

The album was produced by the Gilla Band's bassist, Daniel Fox. The album incorporates elements of no wave and techno. It was very well received by both critics and fans, and has been influential on bands such as Fontaines D.C. and The Murder Capital.

== Music and lyrics ==
In contrast to Gilla Band's two previous albums, the music for Most Normal was largely written while the band were in studio, rather than during rehearsal.

== Reception ==
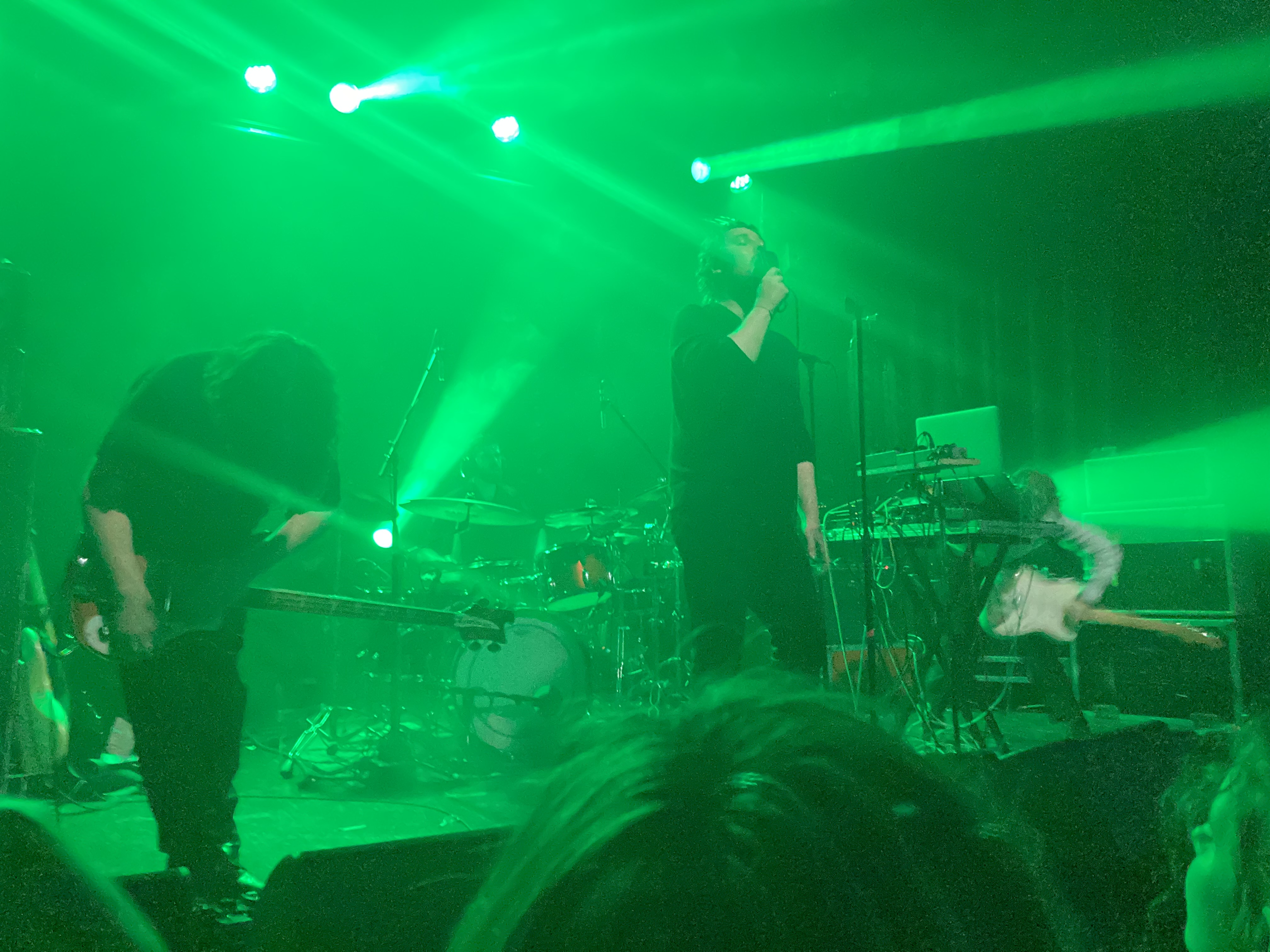
Gilla Band live, 2025. Left to right: Daniel Fox, Dara Kiely

Writing for the Irish Times in 2022, the critic Éamon Sweeney described Dara Kiely's vocals as "often hilariously funny" and "dripping with Irish references from Arklow to Ryanair". He noted the influence of comedians such as Eddie Izzard and Stewart Lee while drawing comparisons to the punk-poet John Cooper Clarke's "wordplay and sheer love of language". Similarly, Pitchfork's Laura Snapes praised the album's "unrelenting [and] surg[ing] with electricity" music, but drew attention to Kiely's vocals and lyric which she described as giving the album an "indignant, surreal mania", while also praising drummer Adam Faulkner’s tight snares which she described as "like he’s whipping static."

The album was described as containing "otherworldly walls of pure chaos" by Hot Press in 2023. In a review for the Guardian wrote that it's "is close[] to nightmare, its wilful rollercoaster of noise strafing listeners with distortion as Kiely pinballs between surrealist gabble and desperate, paint-stripping howls."

== Influence ==
The album has been cited as highly influential by bands such as Fontaines D.C. and The Murder Capital. Commenting on Fontaines D.C. rise to popularity, Gilla Band guitarist Alan Duggan said: "it's nuts watching it cause they're all like rock stars now, and we’re still fucking, er, very much not. Which is fine." Kiely takes a similarly resigned view, and indicated in a 2022 interview that the band's earlier hopes of commercial success have faded, but that "If it all ended tomorrow, I’d be like: ‘Well, that was fucking amazing!’” Kiely says. “We’re incredibly grateful for the paths it’s taken us down. I love impressing the lads, and them impressing me."

== Track listing ==
No.	Title	Length
1.	"The Gum"	2:28
2.	"Eight Fivers"	2:20
3.	"Backwash"	3:21
4.	"Gushie"	1.09
5.	"Bin Liner Fashion"	2:18
6.	"Capgras"	0:55
7.	"The Weirds"	6:44
8.	"I Was Away"	4:38
9.	"Almost Soon"	3:22
10.	"Red Polo Neck"	1:59
11.	"Pratfall"	3:22
12.	"Post Ryan"	4:25

== Personnel ==
=== Gilla Band ===
- Dara Kiely – vocals
- Alan Duggan – guitar
- Daniel Fox – bass guitar, engineering, mixing
- Adam Faulkner – drums

=== Production ===
- Daniel Fox – engineering, production, mixing
