= Sisterworld =

Studio album by Liars
- Released: March 9, 2010
- Recorded: 2009
- Genre: Experimental rock, noise rock, indie rock
- Length: 42:11
- Label: Mute
- Producer: Tom Biller

Liars chronology
Liars (2007)	Sisterworld (2010)	WIXIW (2012)

Singles from Sisterworld
- 1. "Scissor" Released: 15 February 2010; 2. "The Overachievers" Released: 26 May 2010

Professional ratings
Aggregate scores
Source	Rating
AnyDecentMusic?	7.6/10
Metacritic	78/100
Review scores
Source	Rating
AllMusic	4/5 stars
The A.V. Club	A
Billboard	4/5 stars
Mojo	3/5 stars
NME	9/10
Pitchfork	8.1/10
Rolling Stone	3/5 stars
Slant Magazine	4/5 stars
Spin	7/10
Uncut	4/5 stars

Sisterworld is the fifth studio album by experimental rock trio Liars, released on March 9, 2010. The album was written and recorded in Los Angeles with assistance from Tom Biller. In early November, a link was posted on their official Myspace page directing users to www.thesisterworld.com, where "Scissor", the premiere track from Sisterworld was made available for free download and streaming. An expanded version of the album is being released with a bonus remix disc featuring remixes from Radiohead's Thom Yorke, TV on the Radio's Tunde Adebimpe, Blonde Redhead's Kazu Makino, Deerhunter's Bradford Cox, Melvins and others. The music video for "Scissor", directed by Andy Bruntel, won the Best Music Video award at the Vimeo Festival + Awards 2011. In October 2011, NME placed "Scarecrows on a Killer Slant" at number 68 on its list "150 Best Tracks of the Past 15 Years".

== Track listing ==
All lyrics are written by Angus Andrew; all music is composed by Liars.

No.	Title	Length
1.	"Scissor"	3:39
2.	"No Barrier Fun"	2:58
3.	"Here Comes All the People"	3:28
4.	"Drip"	4:15
5.	"Scarecrows on a Killer Slant"	4:15
6.	"I Still Can See an Outside World"	3:14
7.	"Proud Evolution"	5:03
8.	"Drop Dead"	3:37
9.	"The Overachievers"	3:16
10.	"Goodnight Everything"	4:33
11.	"Too Much, Too Much"	3:59
Total length:		42:11

=== Deluxe edition bonus remix disc ===
No.	Title	Remixer	Length
1.	"Scissor"	Pink Dollaz, Lance Whitaker & Transformation Surprise	2:42
2.	"No Barrier Fun"	Duetonal aka Alan Vega of Suicide	3:00
3.	"Here Comes All the People"	Atlas Sound aka Bradford Cox	6:29
4.	"Drip"	Kazu Makino of Blonde Redhead	4:07
5.	"Scarecrows on a Killer Slant"	Tunde Adebimpe of TV On The Radio	2:30
6.	"I Still Can See an Outside World"	Boyd Rice aka NON	3:44
7.	"Proud Evolution"	Thom Yorke 500qd Remix	6:00
8.	"Drop Dead"	Fol Chen	3:52
9.	"The Overachievers"	Devendra Banhart and the Grogs	4:22
10.	"Goodnight Everything"	Melvins	5:05
11.	"Too Much, Too Much"	Carter Tutti of Throbbing Gristle	4:28
Total length:			46:20
