= They Threw Us All in a Trench and Stuck a Monument on Top =

Studio album by Liars
- Released: October 30, 2001
- Recorded: June 30–July 1, 2001
- Genres: Dance-punk; post-punk revival
- Length: 51:32
- Labels: Gern Blandsten, Blast First

Liars chronology
They Threw Us All in a Trench and Stuck a Monument on Top (2001)	Fins to Make Us More Fish-Like (2002)

Professional ratings
Aggregate scores
Source	Rating
Metacritic	77/100
Review scores
Source	Rating
AllMusic	4/5 stars
Alternative Press	8/10
Blender	3/5 stars
Entertainment Weekly	B+
The Guardian	3/5 stars
NME	8/10
Pitchfork	8.1/10
Q	3/5 stars
Rolling Stone	4/5 stars
Uncut	4.5/5 stars

They Threw Us All in a Trench and Stuck a Monument on Top is the debut studio album by Australian-American dance-punk band Liars. The album was first released on October 30, 2001, by Gern Blandsten Records and later re-released in 2002 by English label Blast First. It displays the band in its original line-up with singer Angus Andrew, guitarist Aaron Hemphill, bassist Pat Noecker (currently in These Are Powers), and drummer Ron Albertson.

Underworld's album Beaucoup Fish (1999) was credited by Angus Andrew as the foremost influential album on They Threw Us All in a Trench and Stuck a Monument on Top.

The album received positive reviews from publications such as AllMusic and Pitchfork, which cemented the band's place in recent American music. Robert Christgau of The Village Voice gave the album a two-star honorable mention rating and remarked: "Not a bad trick—tension-and-release that never lets go." The Yeah Yeah Yeahs covered the song "Mr. Your on Fire Mr.", which was released as a B-side of their single "Pin".

"This Dust Makes That Mud" appeared on the Meet Me in the Bathroom soundtrack.

== Track listing ==
1. "Grown Men Don't Fall In the River, Just Like That" – 3:03
2. "Mr. Your on Fire Mr." – 2:27
3. "Loose Nuts on the Veladrome" – 2:19
4. "The Garden Was Crowded and Outside" – 2:44
5. "Tumbling Walls Buried Me In the Debris with ESG" – 4:05 (vocal cover of an ESG song)
6. "Nothing Is Ever Lost or Can Be Lost My Science Friend" – 3:03
7. "We Live NE of Compton" – 3:01
8. "Why Midnight Walked but Didn't Ring Her Bell" – 0:51
9. "This Dust Makes That Mud" – 30:07

The LP version of "This Dust Makes That Mud" is approximately 8:30 and ends in a locked groove; the CD version goes to 8:05, digitally loops the same two-bar phrase until 30:00, and then simulates slowing to a stop.

== Personnel ==
- Angus Andrew - lead vocals, samples, effects, pedals, electronics
- Aaron Hemphill - guitar, backing vocals, mixer, cowbell
- Pat Noecker - bass, co-lead vocals
- Ron Albertson - drums, percussion
