= Drum's Not Dead =

Studio album by Liars
- Released: February 20, 2006
- Recorded: 2004
- Studios: Planet Roc (Berlin, Germany)
- Genres: Experimental rock; post-rock; psychedelia; indie rock
- Length: 47:29
- Label: Mute
- Producer: Angus Andrew

Liars chronology
They Were Wrong, So We Drowned (2004)	Drum's Not Dead (2006)	Liars (2007)

Professional ratings
Aggregate scores
Source	Rating
Metacritic	79/100
Review scores
Source	Rating
AllMusic	4/5 stars
Alternative Press	5/5
The A.V. Club	B+
Entertainment Weekly	B+
The Guardian	3/5 stars
Mojo	4/5 stars
NME	7/10
Pitchfork	9.0/10
Rolling Stone	3.5/5 stars
Spin	B−

Drum's Not Dead is the third album by experimental rock band Liars, released on February 20, 2006 through Mute Records. It was recorded at the Planet Roc recording studio in Berlin and produced by Angus Andrew. The album's atmospheric sound is characterized by pounding drums, highly distorted guitar drones, and falsetto vocals. Upon initial release, the album featured a DVD with three different long-form music videos of the entire album.

Pitchfork ranked the album number 6 on their list of the Top 50 albums of 2006.

== Background ==
Drum's Not Dead emerged in 2004 as a loose concept album following the recording of a shelved album, which the band then used as a musical blueprint. The album's title and several track names refer to two fictional characters—Drum and Mt. Heart Attack—who, according to the band following the album's release, represent a state of being, à la yin and yang. Drum is assertive and productive, the spirit of creative confidence. With two drum kits integral to many of these percussive, propulsive, highly rhythmic convulsions, Drum came to be acknowledged as a fourth member of the band. Conversely, Mt. Heart Attack is the reaction to Drum's action, the embodiment of stress and self-doubt. Both became key characters in the creative process of the album.

== Track listing ==
1. "Be Quiet Mt. Heart Attack!" – 3:28
2. "Let's Not Wrestle Mt. Heart Attack" – 4:31
3. "A Visit from Drum" – 4:19
4. "Drum Gets a Glimpse" – 4:14
5. "It Fit When I Was a Kid" – 4:02
6. "The Wrong Coat for You Mt. Heart Attack" – 3:59
7. "Hold You, Drum" – 4:42
8. "It's All Blooming Now Mt. Heart Attack" – 3:09
9. "Drum and the Uncomfortable Can" – 4:55
10. "You, Drum" – 1:15
11. "To Hold You, Drum" – 4:04
12. "The Other Side of Mt. Heart Attack" – 4:45

DVD

1. "Drum's Not Bread" (directed by Julian Gross)
2. "The Helix Aspersa" (directed by Angus Andrew)
3. "By Your Side" (directed by Markus Wambsganss)

== Personnel ==
- Angus Andrew - vocals, guitar, synthesizers
- Aaron Hemphill - percussion, effects, samples, synthesizers, additional drums
- Julian Gross - drums, percussion, additional synthesizers
