= Blawan =

- Also known as: Bored Young Adults; Kilner
- Born: Jamie Roberts; South Yorkshire, England
- Origin: Barnsley
- Genres: Techno; garage; post-dubstep; industrial techno
- Occupations: DJ; record producer
- Years active: 2010–present
- Labels: Hessle Audio; R&S; Ternesc; XL
- Member of: Karenn; Parassela; Trade; Persher
- Website: blawan.com

Jamie Roberts, better known by his stage name Blawan, is an English DJ and record producer from South Yorkshire. He is best known for his track "Why They Hide Their Bodies Under My Garage?" and his remix of the Radiohead track "Bloom", which appeared on their album TKOL RMX 1234567 (2011). He came to prominence with his debut release Fram on the label Hessle Audio and signed to R&S Records. He also started a hardware-only project Karenn, with fellow R&S producer Pariah. His stage name derives from Java Blawan coffee, which he often drank while at university.

Credited as one of the artists spearheading the industrial techno revival, Blawan's post-dubstep sounds and raw, techno-influenced beats have earned him praise from DJs such as Surgeon and The Black Dog. According to Philip Sherburne of Pitchfork, his music is "full of jackhammering kicks, splintered wooden percussion, and short-fuse breakdowns".

He also released Wet Will Always Dry (2018) and SickElixir (2025).

== Discography ==
=== Albums ===
- Wet Will Always Dry (Ternesc, 2018)
- SickElixir (XL Recordings, 2025)

=== EPs ===
- Peaches (2011)
- Bohla (2011)
- Cursory (with The Analogue Cops; 2011)
- Long Distance Open Water Worker (2012)
- His He She & She (2012)
- Warm Tonal Touch (2015)
- Hanging Out the Birds (2015)
- Communicat 1022 (2016)
- Shy Dancers on Bungalowdorf Beach (as Bored Young Adults; 2016)
- Walk Type (as Kilner; 2016)
- Nutrition (2017)
- Many Many Pings (2019)
- Immulsion (2020)
- Make a Goose (2020)
- Soft Waahls (2021)
- Woke Up Right Handed (2021)
- Dismantled into Juice (2023)
- BouQ (2024)

=== Singles ===
- "Fram" / "Iddy" (2010)
- "Jackal Ter9's" / "Mid-Life Crisis" (with Ste Shine; 2010)
- "Getting Me Down" (2011)
- "What You Do with What You Have" / "Vibe Decorum" (2011)
- "Toast" (2023)
- "Fires" (2024)
