= Liars (band) =

Australian-American post-punk band

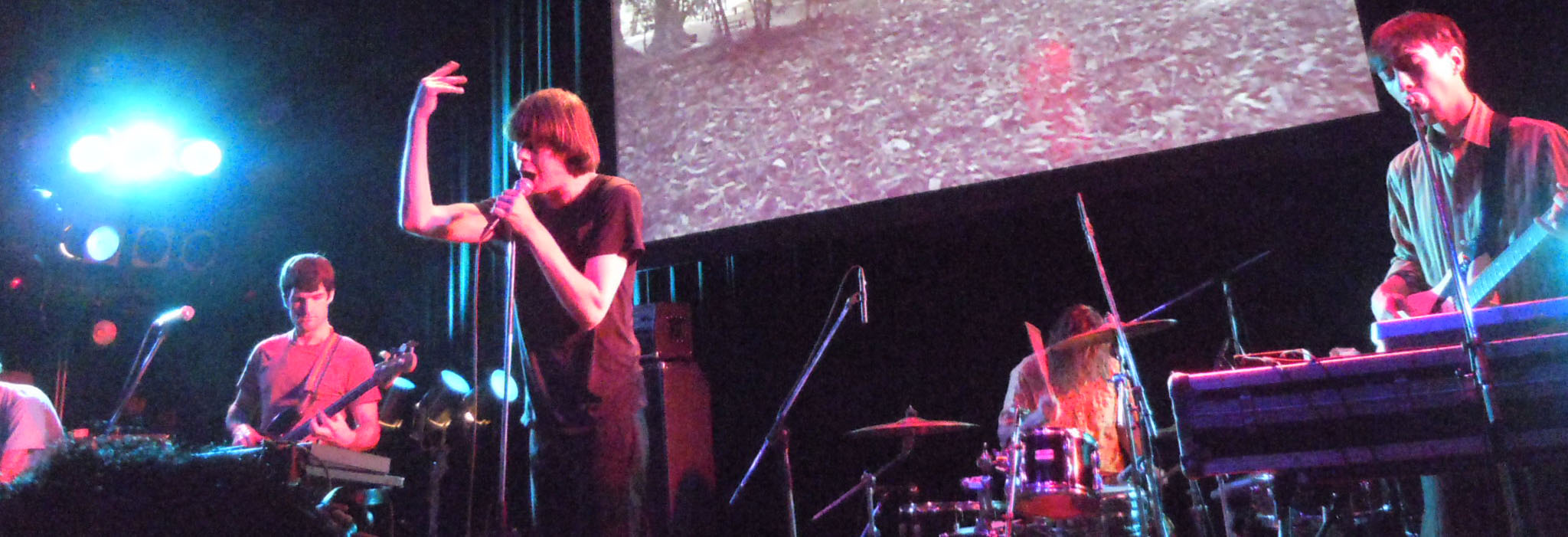
- Liars performing in Tokyo, Japan in 2011

Background information
- Origin: Brooklyn, New York, U.S.
- Genres: Post-punk; experimental rock; electronica; dance-punk
- Years active: 2000–present
- Labels: Gern Blandsten, Blast First, Mute
- Members: Angus Andrew; Cameron Deyell; Laurence Pike
- Past members: Pat Noecker; Ron Albertson; Aaron Hemphill; Julian Gross

Liars (formerly The Liars) are an Australian-American experimental rock band formed in Brooklyn, New York, in 2000. Angus Andrew is the founding and only constant member of Liars, currently joined by multi-instrumentalist Cameron Deyell and drummer Laurence Pike.

Aaron Hemphill played with the band from their inception until his departure in 2017. Julian Gross joined the band for their second album They Were Wrong, So We Drowned in 2004, and played with the band until 2014.

Liars have released ten studio albums and are signed to Mute Records. Stylistically, they combine elements of rock and punk with experimental electronica, with Andrew crediting influences such as OMD, The Cure, PJ Harvey, Underworld, The Doors and Michael Franks.

== History ==
=== The beginnings ===
Liars were formed in 2000 by singer Angus Andrew and guitarist Aaron Hemphill in Brooklyn, New York, soon joined by drummer Ron Albertson and bass player Pat Noecker. The band's style was originally an experimental version of hardcore punk, and the band was soon welcomed in the New York City scene documented in Meet Me in the Bathroom (film). The band started to get relevant in the scene, managing to open a Sonic Youth show.

=== They Threw Us All in a Trench and Stuck A Monument on Top and break up ===
Liars released on October 30, 2001 their first album They Threw Us All in a Trench and Stuck a Monument on Top. After some studio transmission, participations, shows, and some EPs, the band broke up.

=== Reunion and They Were Wrong, So We Drowned ===
After breaking up in 2002, the various members of Liars started doing other things. But while Noecker and Albertson were collaborating with other projects like N0 Things and These Are Powers. Andrew, Hemphill and drummer Julian Gross were restarting Liars, concentrating on a more experimental and noise rock approach. With these intents, the group published in 2004 They Were Wrong, So We Drowned, a noise and experimental concept album about witchcraft, were Andrew and Hemphill were equally dividing their singing parts.

=== Liars ===
The band announced their album Liars on May 24, 2007. It was released August 28, 2007 on Mute Records.

=== Sisterworld ===
On November 2, 2009, Pitchfork reported that Liars had updated their MySpace page by posting links to the website. Upon clicking the door displayed on the website, three short clips are shown, all three of natural landscapes with amplified ambient sounds. However, when the word "SISTERWORLD" below the door is clicked, the viewer is taken to the Liars' merchandise page.

On November 4, the band confirmed that Sisterworld would be the new album, and would be released in early 2010 on Mute Records. According to the Pitchfork article, It was written and recorded in Los Angeles with Jon Brion collaborator Tom Biller and much inspired by the city.

The band were chosen by Portishead to perform at the ATP I'll Be Your Mirror festival that they curated in July 2011 at London's Alexandra Palace.

=== WIXIW ===
The band released their sixth album entitled WIXIW (pronounced 'wish you') on June 4, 2012. The first single from the album, No. 1 Against the Rush, was released on 28 May 2012. It was written in an isolated cabin north of Los Angeles with the aim of removing themselves from the influence of "extraneous things".

=== Mess ===
On January 13, 2014, Liars premiered their single "Mess on a Mission" and announced the title of their seventh album as Mess, which was released on March 24 via Mute Records.

=== TFCF ===
On February 20, 2017, Liars updated their site with a short video clip titled TFCF. Another video was later added, called TFCF H, and then TFCF E, and so on. When taking the last letter of each of these videos, the word THEME is spelled out. On June 2, the band released four more videos which spell out the word FROM. On June 15 and June 24, more videos were released spelling the words CRYING and FOUNTAIN, respectively. On May 18, Andrew announced a new Liars album to be released sometime in August, along with the amicable departure of founding member Aaron Hemphill. He will go on tour from August with a new backup band.

The initialism TFCF was the title of the band's LP which was released on August 25, 2017. Liars have, as a matter of course, sounded radically different with each album, pursuing new concepts and occupying diverse mindsets. On this, Liars’ eighth studio album, the backdrops of Los Angeles, Berlin and New York have been replaced with a presence far more intimate and autobiographical.

=== The Apple Drop ===
On May 4, 2021, Liars announced the release of a new album, titled The Apple Drop, which was released on August 6.

== Discography ==
=== Albums ===
Title	Album details	Peak chart positions				
Title	Album details	US	US Indie	BEL (FL)	BEL (WA)	UK
They Threw Us All in a Trench and Stuck a Monument on Top	Released: 30 October 2001; Label: Gern Blandsten	—	—	—	—	192
They Were Wrong, So We Drowned	Released: 24 February 2004; Label: Mute	—	—	—	—	—
Drum's Not Dead	Released: 20 February 2006; Label: Mute	—	—	—	—	—
Liars	Released: 28 August 2007; Label: Mute	— (Note: Liars did not enter the US Billboard 200, but peaked at number nine on the US Heatseekers Albums Chart.)	—	—	—	—
Sisterworld	Released: 9 March 2010; Label: Mute	— (Note: Sisterworld did not enter the US Billboard 200, but peaked at number 11 on the US Heatseekers Albums Chart.)	38	90	—	183
WIXIW	Released: 4 June 2012; Label: Mute	192	35	94	196	177
Mess	Released: 24 March 2014; Label: Mute	172	39	74	104	113
TFCF	Released: 25 August 2017; Label: Mute	—	—	—	—	—
Titles with the Word Fountain	Released: 21 September 2018; Label: Mute	—	—	—	—	—
The Apple Drop	Released: 6 August 2021; Label: Mute	—	—	—	—	—
A Ban on Plastic Bag Bans	Released: 5 March 2027; Label: Mute	—	—	—	—	—
"—" denotes album that did not chart or was not released

== Awards and nominations ==
=== ARIA Music Awards ===
The ARIA Music Awards is an annual awards ceremony held by the Australian Recording Industry Association. They commenced in 1987.

Year	Nominee / work	Award	Result	Ref.
2018	1/1 (Original Soundtrack)	Best Original Soundtrack, Cast or Show Album	Nominated	
