= List of works by Stuart Price =

Stuart Price (born 9 September 1977) is a three-time Grammy-winning British electronic musician, songwriter, and record producer known for his work with artists including Madonna, The Killers, New Order, Kylie Minogue, Example, Take That, Missy Elliott, Scissor Sisters, Pet Shop Boys, Brandon Flowers, Gwen Stefani, Seal, Keane, Frankmusik, Hard-Fi, Hurts, Everything Everything and Darin. His acts include British electronic pop/rock band Zoot Woman (with Adam Blake and Johnny Blake), Les Rythmes Digitales, Paper Faces, Man With Guitar, Thin White Duke (not to be confused with David Bowie's earlier persona of the same name), and the parodic French moniker Jacques Lu Cont (though he actually grew up in Reading, England). Price receives songwriting or production credit for the following songs:

== Discography of songs written and produced by Stuart Price ==
Year	Artist	Album	Title	Producer	Other role
2003	Madonna	American Life	"X-Static Process"		Songwriter
2003	P Diddy	Non-album single	"Let's Get Ill" (featuring Kelis)	check	Songwriter
2005	New Order	Waiting for the Sirens' Call	"Jetstream"	check	Songwriter
2005	New Order	Waiting for the Sirens' Call	"Guilt is a Useless Emotion"	check	
2005	Juliet	Random Order	"Avalon"	check	Songwriter
2005	Juliet	Random Order	"Ride the Pain"	check	
2005	Juliet	Random Order	"Au"	check	Songwriter
2005	Juliet	Random Order	"Nu Taboo"	check	Songwriter
2005	Juliet	Random Order	"Never Land"	check	Songwriter
2005	Juliet	Random Order	"Puppet"	check	Songwriter
2005	Juliet	Random Order	"On the Dancefloor"	check	Songwriter
2005	Juliet	Random Order	"Waiting"	check	Songwriter
2005	Juliet	Random Order	"Would You Mind"	check	Songwriter
2005	Juliet	Random Order	"United"	check	Songwriter
2005	Juliet	Random Order	"Pot of Gold"	check	Songwriter
2005	Princess Superstar	My Machine	"My Machine"	check	Songwriter
2005	Princess Superstar	My Machine	"Artery"	check	Songwriter
2005	The Veronicas	The Secret Life Of...	"A Teardrop Hitting the Ground"	check	
2005	Madonna	Confessions on a Dance Floor	"Hung Up"	check	Songwriter
2005	Madonna	Confessions on a Dance Floor	"Get Together"	check	Songwriter
2005	Madonna	Confessions on a Dance Floor	"Sorry"	check	Songwriter
2005	Madonna	Confessions on a Dance Floor	"I Love New York"	check	Songwriter
2005	Madonna	Confessions on a Dance Floor	"Let It Will Be"	check	Songwriter
2005	Madonna	Confessions on a Dance Floor	"Forbidden Love"	check	Songwriter
2005	Madonna	Confessions on a Dance Floor	"Jump"	check	Songwriter
2005	Madonna	Confessions on a Dance Floor	"How High"		
2005	Madonna	Confessions on a Dance Floor	"Isaac"	check	Songwriter
2005	Madonna	Confessions on a Dance Floor	"Push"	check	Songwriter
2007	The Killers	Sawdust	"Leave the Bourbon on the Shelf"	check	
2007	The Killers	Sawdust	"Sweet Talk"		Secondary producer
2007	Seal	System	"If It's in My Mind, It's on My Face"	check	Songwriter
2007	Seal	System	"Just Like Before"	check	Songwriter
2007	Seal	System	"Loaded"	check	Songwriter
2007	Seal	System	"Wedding Day" (with Heidi Klum)	check	Songwriter
2007	Seal	System	"System"	check	
2007	Seal	System	"Dumb"	check	
2007	Seal	System	"The Right Life"	check	Songwriter
2007	Seal	System	"Rolling"	check	
2007	Seal	System	"Immaculate"	check	
2007	Seal	System	"Amazing"	check	
2008	The Killers	Day & Age	"Human"	check	
2008	Innerpartysystem	Innerpartysystem	"Last Night in Brooklyn"	check	
2008	Innerpartysystem	Innerpartysystem	"Structure"	check	
2008	Innerpartysystem	Innerpartysystem	"Obsession"	check	
2008	Innerpartysystem	Innerpartysystem	"New Poetry"	check	
2008	Keane	Perfect Symmetry	"Again and Again"		Secondary producer
2008	Keane	Perfect Symmetry	"Black Burning Heart"		Secondary producer
2008	The Killers	Day & Age	"Spaceman"	check	
2008	The Killers	Day & Age	"Losing Touch"	check	
2008	The Killers	Day & Age	"Joyride"	check	
2008	The Killers	Day & Age	"A Dustland Fairytale"	check	
2008	The Killers	Day & Age	"This is Your Life"	check	
2008	The Killers	Day & Age	"I Can't Stay"	check	
2008	The Killers	Day & Age	"Neon Tiger"	check	
2008	The Killers	Day & Age	"The World We Live In"	check	
2008	The Killers	Day & Age	"Goodnight, Travel Well"	check	
2008	The Killers	Day & Age	"A Crippling Bow"	check	
2008	The Killers	Day & Age	"Forget About What I Said"	check	
2008	The Killers	Day & Age	"Tidal Wave"	check	
2008	Frankmusik	Complete Me	"3 Little Words"	check	
2009	Frankmusik	Complete Me	"Better Off as 2"		Additional producer
2009	Frankmusik	Complete Me	"Confusion Girl"	check	
2009	Frankmusik	Complete Me	"Gotta Boyfriend?"	check	
2009	Frankmusik	Complete Me	"Your Boy"	check	
2009	Frankmusik	Complete Me	"When You're Around"	check	
2009	Frankmusik	Complete Me	"Wonder Woman"	check	
2009	Frankmusik	Complete Me	"Complete Me"	check	
2009	Frankmusik	Complete Me	"Time Will Tell"	check	
2009	Frankmusik	Complete Me	"Run Away from Trouble"	check	
2010	Kylie Minogue	Aphrodite	"All the Lovers"		Secondary producer
2010	Scissor Sisters	Night Work	"Fire with Fire"	check	Songwriter
2010	Scissor Sisters	Night Work	"Night Work"	check	Songwriter
2010	Scissor Sisters	Night Work	"Whole New Way"	check	Songwriter
2010	Scissor Sisters	Night Work	"Any Which Way"	check	Songwriter
2010	Scissor Sisters	Night Work	"Harder You Get"	check	Songwriter
2010	Scissor Sisters	Night Work	"Running Out"	check	
2010	Scissor Sisters	Night Work	"Skin This Cat"	check	
2010	Scissor Sisters	Night Work	"Skin Tight"	check	Songwriter
2010	Scissor Sisters	Night Work	"Sex and Violence"	check	
2010	Scissor Sisters	Night Work	"Night Life"	check	Songwriter
2010	Scissor Sisters	Night Work	"Invisible Light"	check	Songwriter
2010	Kylie Minogue	Aphrodite	"Get Outta My Way"		Secondary producer
2010	Kylie Minogue	Aphrodite	"Put Your Hands Up (If You Feel Love)"		Secondary producer
2010	Kylie Minogue	Aphrodite	"Closer"	check	Songwriter
2010	Kylie Minogue	Aphrodite	"Aphrodite"		Secondary producer
2010	Kylie Minogue	Aphrodite	"Illusion"	check	Songwriter
2010	Kylie Minogue	Aphrodite	"Better than Today"		Secondary producer
2010	Kylie Minogue	Aphrodite	"Cupid Boy"	check	
2010	Kylie Minogue	Aphrodite	"Looking for an Angel"	check	Songwriter
2010	Kylie Minogue	Aphrodite	"Can't Beat the Feeling"	check	
2010	Brandon Flowers	Flamingo	"Only the Young"	check	
2010	Brandon Flowers	Flamingo	"Hard Enough" (featuring Jenny Lewis)	check	
2010	Brandon Flowers	Flamingo	"Jilted Lovers & Broken Hearts"	check	Songwriter
2010	Brandon Flowers	Flamingo	"Playing with Fire"	check	
2010	Brandon Flowers	Flamingo	"Was It Something I Said?"	check	
2010	Brandon Flowers	Flamingo	"On the Floor"	check	
2010	Brandon Flowers	Flamingo	"Swallow It"	check	
2010	Brandon Flowers	Flamingo	"The Clock Was Tickin'"	check	
2010	Brandon Flowers	Flamingo	"Jacksonville"	check	
2010	Brandon Flowers	Flamingo	"I Came Here to Get Over You"	check	
2010	Brandon Flowers	Flamingo	"Right Behind You"	check	Songwriter
2010	Take That	Progress	"The Flood"	check	
2010	Duffy	Endlessly	"Well, Well, Well"		Secondary producer
2010	Take That	Progress	"SOS"	check	
2010	Take That	Progress	"Wait"	check	
2010	Take That	Progress	"Kidz"	check	
2010	Take That	Progress	"Pretty Things"	check	
2010	Take That	Progress	"Happy Now"	check	
2010	Take That	Progress	"Underground Machine"	check	
2010	Take That	Progress	"What Do You Want from Me?"	check	
2010	Take That	Progress	"Affirmation"	check	
2010	Take That	Progress	"Eight Letters"	check	
2010	Take That	Progress	"Flowerbed"	check	
2010	Duffy	Endlessly	"Keeping My Baby"		Additional producer
2010	Duffy	Endlessly	"Don't Forsake Me"		Additional producer
2010	Duffy	Endlessly	"Lovestruck"		Additional producer
2011	Take That	Progressed EP	"Love Love"	check	
2011	Take That	Progressed EP	"When We Were Young"	check	
2011	Take That	Progressed EP	"Man"	check	
2011	Take That	Progressed EP	"The Day the Work is Done"	check	
2011	Take That	Progressed EP	"Beautiful"	check	
2011	Take That	Progressed EP	"Don't Say Goodbye"	check	
2011	Take That	Progressed EP	"Aliens"	check	
2011	Take That	Progressed EP	"Wonderful World"	check	
2011	Hard-Fi	Killer Sounds	"Fire in the House"	check	
2011	Hard-Fi	Killer Sounds	"Love Song"	check	
2011	The Killers	(Red) Christmas EP	"Don't Shoot Me Santa"		Additional producer
2011	The Killers	(Red) Christmas EP	"Joseph, Better You Than Me" (featuring Elton John and Neil Tennant)	check	
2011	The Killers	(Red) Christmas EP	"¡Happy Birthday Guadalupe!" (featuring Wild Light and Mariachi El Bronx)	check	
2011	The Killers	(Red) Christmas EP	"Boots"		Secondary producer
2012	Scissor Sisters	Magic Hour	"The Secret Life of Letters"	check	
2012	Scissor Sisters	Magic Hour	"Somewhere"		Additional producer
2012	The Killers	Battle Born	"Miss Atomic Bomb"	check	
2012	The Killers	Battle Born	"Carry Me Home"	check	
2013	Pet Shop Boys	Electric	"Axis"	check	
2013	Pet Shop Boys	Electric	"Vocal"	check	
2013	Pet Shop Boys	Electric	"Bolshy"	check	
2013	Pet Shop Boys	Electric	"Love Is a Bourgeois Construct"	check	
2013	Pet Shop Boys	Electric	"Fluorescent"	check	
2013	Pet Shop Boys	Electric	"Inside a Dream"	check	
2013	Pet Shop Boys	Electric	"The Last to Die"	check	
2013	Pet Shop Boys	Electric	"Shouting in the Evening"	check	
2013	Pet Shop Boys	Electric	"Thursday"	check	
2013	The Fray	Helios	"Love Don't Die"	check	
2013	The Killers	Direct Hits	"Just Another Girl"	check	
2014	The Fray	Helios	"Hurricane"	check	
2014	The Fray	Helios	"Hold My Hand"	check	
2014	The Fray	Helios	"Give It Away"	check	
2014	The Fray	Helios	"Closer to Me"	check	
2014	The Fray	Helios	"Keep On Waiting"	check	
2014	The Fray	Helios	"Our Last Days"	check	
2014	The Fray	Helios	"Break Your Plans"	check	
2014	The Fray	Helios	"Wherever This Goes"	check	
2014	The Fray	Helios	"Shadow and a Dancer"	check	
2014	The Fray	Helios	"Same as You"	check	
2014	The Fray	Helios	"Winter Sun"	check	
2014	The Fray	Helios	"500,000 Acres"	check	
2014	Example	Live Life Living	"Next Year"	check	Songwriter
2014	Example	Live Life Living	"At Night"	check	Songwriter
2014	Example	Live Life Living	"Longest Goodbye"	check	Songwriter
2014	Steve Angello	Wild Youth	"Wasted Love" (featuring Dougy)	check	Songwriter
2014	Take That	III	"Let in the Sun"	check	
2014	Take That	III	"Lovelife"	check	
2014	Take That	III	"Portrait"	check	
2014	Take That	III	"I Like It"	check	
2014	Take That	III	"Give Me Your Love"	check	
2014	Take That	III	"Into the Wild"	check	
2015	Everything Everything	Get to Heaven	"Distant Past"	check	
2015	Everything Everything	Get to Heaven	"Regret"	check	
2015	Everything Everything	Get to Heaven	"To the Bible"	check	
2015	Everything Everything	Get to Heaven	"Get to Heaven"	check	
2015	Everything Everything	Get to Heaven	"Spring / Sun / Winter / Dread"	check	
2015	Everything Everything	Get to Heaven	"The Wheel Is (Turning Now)"	check	
2015	Everything Everything	Get to Heaven	"Furtune 500"	check	
2015	Everything Everything	Get to Heaven	"Blast Doors"	check	
2015	Everything Everything	Get to Heaven	"Zero Pharoah"	check	
2015	Everything Everything	Get to Heaven	"No Replies"	check	
2015	Everything Everything	Get to Heaven	"Warm Healer"	check	
2015	Everything Everything	Get to Heaven	"We Sleep in Pairs"	check	
2015	Everything Everything	Get to Heaven	"Hapsburg Lippp"	check	
2015	Everything Everything	Get to Heaven	"President Heartbeat"	check	
2015	Everything Everything	Get to Heaven	"Brainchild"	check	
2015	Everything Everything	Get to Heaven	"Yuppie Super"	check	
2015	Everything Everything	Get to Heaven	"Only as Good as My God"	check	
2015	New Order	Music Complete	"Superheated" (featuring Brandon Flowers)		Additional producer
2015	Kacy Hill	Bloo EP	"Arm's Length"	check	
2015	Hurts	Surrender	"Nothing Will Be Bigger than Us"	check	Songwriter
2015	Hurts	Surrender	"Kaleidoscope"	check	
2015	Steve Angello	Wild Youth	"Remember" (featuring The Presets)	check	Songwriter
2016	Pet Shop Boys	Super	"The Pop Kids"	check	
2016	Pet Shop Boys	Super	"Happiness"	check	
2016	Pet Shop Boys	Super	"Twenty-Something"	check	
2016	Pet Shop Boys	Super	"Groovy"	check	
2016	Pet Shop Boys	Super	"The Dictator Decides"	check	
2016	Pet Shop Boys	Super	"Pazzol"	check	
2016	Pet Shop Boys	Super	"Inner Sanctum"	check	
2016	Pet Shop Boys	Super	"Undertow"	check	
2016	Pet Shop Boys	Super	"Sad Robot World"	check	
2016	Pet Shop Boys	Super	"Say It to Me"	check	Songwriter
2016	Pet Shop Boys	Super	"Burn"	check	
2016	Pet Shop Boys	Super	"Into Thin Air"	check	
2016	Kacy Hill	Like a Woman	"Lion"	check	
2016	The Fray	Through the Years: The Best of the Fray	"Singing Low"	check	
2016	Robbie Williams	The Heavy Entertainment Show	"Mixed Signals"	check	
2016	Robbie Williams	The Heavy Entertainment Show	"Bruce Lee"	check	Songwriter
2016	Robbie Williams	The Heavy Entertainment Show	"Sensitive"	check	Songwriter
2017	Kiesza	Non-album single	"Dearly Beloved"	check	Songwriter
2017	Maty Noyes	Non-album single	"London"	check	
2017	Take That	Wonderland	"Lucky Stars"	check	
2017	Take That	Wonderland	"Superstar"	check	
2017	Take That	Wonderland	"The Last Poet"	check	
2017	Kacy Hill	Like a Woman	"Hard to Love"	check	
2017	Kacy Hill	Like a Woman	"Cruel"		Additional producer
2017	Kacy Hill	Like a Woman	"First Time"	check	
2017	Kacy Hill	Like a Woman	"Say You're Wrong"	check	
2017	The Killers	Wonderful Wonderful	"Run for Cover"		Songwriter
2017	The Killers	Wonderful Wonderful	"Out of My Mind"		Songwriter, Additional producer
2018	Kiesza	Non-album single	"Phantom of the Dancefloor" (featuring Philippe Sly)	check	
2018	The Knocks	New York Narcotic	"Don't Talk Love"	check	Songwriter
2019	Biffy Clyro	Balance, Not Symmetry	"Colour Wheel"		Songwriter
2019	Sundara Karma	Ulfilas' Alphabet	"A Song for My Future Self"	check	
2019	Sundara Karma	Ulfilas' Alphabet	"One Last Night on This Earth"	check	
2019	Sundara Karma	Ulfilas' Alphabet	"Greenhands"	check	
2019	Sundara Karma	Ulfilas' Alphabet	"Symbols of Joy & Eternity"	check	
2019	Sundara Karma	Ulfilas' Alphabet	"Higher States"	check	
2019	Sundara Karma	Ulfilas' Alphabet	"Illusions"	check	
2019	Sundara Karma	Ulfilas' Alphabet	"Little Smart Houses"	check	
2019	Sundara Karma	Ulfilas' Alphabet	"Duller Days"	check	
2019	Sundara Karma	Ulfilas' Alphabet	"Sweet Intentions"	check	
2019	Sundara Karma	Ulfilas' Alphabet	"Rainbow Body"	check	
2019	Sundara Karma	Ulfilas' Alphabet	"Ulfilas' Alphabet"	check	
2019	Sundara Karma	Ulfilas' Alphabet	"Home (There Was Never Any Reason to Feel So Alone)"	check	
2019	Pet Shop Boys	Hotspot	"Dreamland"	check	
2019	Pet Shop Boys	Hotspot	"Burning the Heather"		Songwriter
2019	DMA'S	The Glow	"Silver"	check	
2020	DMA'S	The Glow	"Never Before"	check	
2020	DMA'S	The Glow	"The Glow"	check	
2020	DMA'S	The Glow	"Life Is a Game of Changing"	check	
2020	DMA'S	The Glow	"Criminals"	check	
2020	DMA'S	The Glow	"Strangers"	check	
2020	DMA'S	The Glow	"Learning Alive"	check	
2020	DMA'S	The Glow	"Hello Girlfriend"	check	
2020	DMA'S	The Glow	"Appointment"	check	
2020	DMA'S	The Glow	"Round & Around"	check	
2020	DMA'S	The Glow	"Cobracaine"	check	
2020	Pet Shop Boys	Hotspot	"Will-o-the-Wisp"	check	
2020	Pet Shop Boys	Hotspot	"You Are the One"	check	
2020	Pet Shop Boys	Hotspot	"Happy People"	check	
2020	Pet Shop Boys	Hotspot	"Hoping for a Miracle"	check	
2020	Pet Shop Boys	Hotspot	"I Don't Wanna"	check	
2020	Pet Shop Boys	Hotspot	"Monkey Business"	check	
2020	Pet Shop Boys	Hotspot	"Only the Dark"	check	
2020	Pet Shop Boys	Hotspot	"Wedding in Berlin"	check	
2020	Dua Lipa	Future Nostalgia	"Cool"	check	
2020	Dua Lipa	Future Nostalgia	"Levitating"	check	
2020	Dua Lipa	Future Nostalgia	"Hallucinate"	check	
2020	Dua Lipa	Future Nostalgia	"Love Again"		Additional producer
2021	Dua Lipa	Future Nostalgia (The Moonlight Edition)	"That Kind of Woman"	check	
2022	Darin	Non-album single	"Superstar"	check	
2022	Rina Sawayama	Hold The Girl	"Catch Me in the Air"	check	Songwriter
2023	Jessie Ware	That! Feels Good!	"Free Yourself"	check	Songwriter
2023	Jessie Ware	That! Feels Good!	"Pearls"	check	Songwriter
2023	Jessie Ware	That! Feels Good!	"Freak Me Now"	check	Songwriter
2023	Jessie Ware	That! Feels Good!	"Lightning"	check	Songwriter
2023	Romy	Mid Air	"Strong"	check	Songwriter
2023	Romy	Mid Air	"Enjoy Your Life"	check	Songwriter
2023	Romy	Mid Air	"Weightless"	check	Songwriter
2023	Romy	Mid Air	"The Sea"	check	
2023	Romy	Mid Air	"Twice"	check	Songwriter
2023	Romy	Mid Air	"One Last Try"	check	Songwriter
2023	Romy	Mid Air	"Did I"	check	Songwriter
2023	Romy	Mid Air	"Mid Air"	check	
2023	Romy	Mid Air	"She's on My Mind"	check	Songwriter
	Madonna	non-album-single	"La bambola"	check	
2026	FKA Twigs	Eusexua Afterglow	"Wild and Alone"		Additional producer
2026	Jessie Ware	Superbloom	"Sauna"	check	
2026	Jessie Ware	Superbloom	"Ride"	check	
2026	Madonna	Confessions II	"I Feel So Free"	check	Songwriter
2026	Madonna	Confessions II	"Bring Your Love"	check	Songwriter
2026	Madonna	Confessions II	"Read My Lips"	check	Songwriter
2026	Madonna	Confessions II	"Danceteria"	check	Songwriter
2026	Madonna	Confessions II	"Love Sensation"	check	Songwriter
2026	Madonna	Confessions II	"Bizarre"	check	Songwriter
2026	Madonna	Confessions II	"The Test"	check	Songwriter
2026	Madonna	Confessions II	"Good For The Soul"	check	Songwriter
2026	Madonna	Confessions II	"One Step Away"	check	Songwriter
2026	Madonna	Confessions II	"Everything"	check	Songwriter
2026	Madonna	Confessions II	"Love Without Words"	check	Songwriter
2026	Madonna	Confessions II	"School"	check	Songwriter
2026	Madonna	Confessions II	"Fragile"	check	Songwriter
2026	Madonna	Confessions II	"My Sins Are My Savior"	check	Songwriter
2026	Madonna	Confessions II	"Betrayal"	check	Songwriter
2026	Madonna	Confessions II	"L.E.S. Girl"	check	Songwriter

== Remixography ==
Artist	Title	Year	Remix	Duration
A-Trak & Tommy Trash	"Tuna Melt"	2013	Les Rythmes Digitales Mix	4:09
Agent Provocateur	"Elvis Economics"	1996	Les Rythmes Digitales Mix	4:32
Akasha	"Brown Sugar"	1997	Les Rythmes Digitales Mix	5:05
Akasha	"Brown Sugar"	1997	Les Rythmes Digitales Alternative Playback	5:09
Aloud	"Sex & Sun"	2004	Thin White Duke Mix	8:06
Aloud	"Sex & Sun"	2004	Thin White Duke Extended Mix	?
Arkarna	"Eat Me"	1997	Benidorm Dub Mix by Les Rythmes Digitales	6:33
Arkarna	"Eat Me"	1997	Benidorm Vocal Mix by Les Rythmes Digitales	6:31
Armand Van Helden	"Sugar"	2006	Paper Faces Mix	6:38
Armand Van Helden	"Sugar"	2006	Paper Faces Dub	6:37
Beck	"Mixed Bizness"	2000	Nu Wave Dreamix by Les Rythmes Digitales	4:22
Bis	"Eurodisco"	1998	Les Rythmes Digitales Remix	5:21
Bis	"Eurodisco"	1998	Les Rythmes Digitales Instrumental	5:21
Boys Noize	"Ich R U"	2013	Jacques Lu Cont Remix	6:01
Britney Spears	"Breathe on Me"	2004	Jacques Lu Cont Mix	8:10
Britney Spears	"Breathe on Me"	2005	Jacques Lu Cont's Thin White Duke Remix	3:56
Cassius	"Feeling For You"	1999	Les Rythmes Digitales-Dreamix	7:36
Cassius	"Feeling For You"	1999	Les Rythmes Digitales-Dreamix / Edit	3:33
Cassius	"Feeling For You"	1999	Les Rythmes Digitales-Dreamix / Short Remix	5:16
Catalan FC	"Respect Is Burning"	1997	Les Rythmes Digitales Remix	7:17
Chili Hi Fly	"Is It Love?"	2000	Les Rythmes Digitales Remix	6:08
Chromeo	"Needy Girl"	2005	Paper Faces Remix	7:20
Chromeo	"Needy Girl"	2005	Paper Faces Dub	7:19
Coldplay	"Charlie Brown"	2012	Jacques Lu Cont Remix	6:17
Coldplay	"Talk"	2005	Thin White Duke Mix	8:28
Coldplay	"Talk"	2005	Stuart Price Thin White Duke Remix Radio Edit	?
Coldplay	"Viva la Vida"	2008	Thin White Duke Mix	7:25
Coldplay	"Viva la Vida"	2008	Thin White Duke Dub	7:26
Cornershop	"Sleep on the Left Side"	1998	Les Rythmes Digitales Living By Numbers Mix	4:45
Cut Copy	"Like Breaking Glass"	2020	Jacques Lu Cont Remix	4:47
Deejay Punk-Roc	"My Beatbox"	1998	Les Rythmes Digitales 'As De Pique' Remix	6:27
Depeche Mode	"A Pain That I'm Used To"	2005	Jacques Lu Cont Remix	7:52
Depeche Mode	"A Pain That I'm Used To"	2005	Jacques Lu Cont Remix Edit	4:47
Depeche Mode	"A Pain That I'm Used To"	2005	Jacques Lu Cont Dub	8:00
Depeche Mode	"A Pain That I'm Used To"	2005	Jacques Lu Cont Alternate Vox	?
Depeche Mode	"Soothe My Soul"	2013	Steve Angello vs. Jacques Lu Cont Remix	7:04
Depeche Mode	"Wrong"	2009	Thin White Duke Mix	7:40
Depeche Mode	"Wrong"	2009	Thin White Duke Dub	6:04
Dirty Beatniks	"Beatniks Bounce"	1996	Les Rythmes Digitales Mix	5:25
Dirty South	"City of Dreams"	2013	Jacques Lu Cont Remix	5:29
DMA's	"Cobracaine"	2020	Jacques Lu Cont Remix	5:04
DMA's	"Cobracaine"	2020	Jacques Lu Cont Remix Edit	3:29
Dua Lipa	"That Kind of Woman"	2020	Jacques Lu Cont Remix	4:50
Dua Lipa	"That Kind of Woman"	2020	Jacques Lu Cont Remix / Mixed	3:14
E-Klektik	"Maracana Madness"	2000	Jacques Lu Cont Edit	3:35
E-Klektik	"Maracana Madness"	2000	Zoot Woman Mix	5:45
Electric Six	"Danger! High Voltage"	2002	Thin White Duke Mix	7:40
Felix Da Housecat	"Ready2Wear"	2004	Paper Faces Mix	7:32
Felix Da Housecat	"Silver Screen Shower Scene"	2002	Jacques Lu Cont's Thin White Duke Mix	8:38
Felix Da Housecat	"We All Wanna Be Prince"	2009	Paper Faces Mix	6:40
Fischerspooner	"Just Let Go"	2004	Thin White Duke Remix	8:10
Fischerspooner	"Just Let Go"	2004	Thin White Duke Radio Remix	4:19
Frankmusik	"3 Little Words"	2009	Paper Faces Mix	7:16
Frantic Language	"Move It"	1998	Les Rythmes Digitales Main Mix	6:59
Frantic Language	"Move It"	1998	Les Rythmes Digitales Instrumental	6:58
Friendly Fires	"Jump in the Pool"	2009	Thin White Duke Mix	7:04
Galantis	"Peanut Butter Jelly"	2015	Jacques Lu Cont Mix	4:46
Gerling	"Dust Me Selecta"	2000	Jacques Lu Cont Mix	6:20
Gerling	"Dust Me Selecta"	2000	Jacques Lu Cont Dub	?
Gerling	"Dust Me Selecta"	2000	Jacques Lu Cont Edit	4:01
Ghosts	"The World is Outside"	2007	Stuart Price Version	3:35
Giorgio Moroder	"Déjà Vu"	2015	Thin White Duke Remix	5:24
Glamorous Hooligan	"Stoned Island Estate"	1998	Les Rythmes Digitales Remix	6:00
Goldfrapp	"Twist"	2003	Jacques Lu Cont's Conversion Perversion Mix	6:47
Goldfrapp	"Twist"	2003	Jacques Lu Cont's Conversion Perversion Dub	6:44
Gwen Stefani	"4 in the Morning"	2007	Thin White Duke Mix	7:01
Gwen Stefani	"4 in the Morning"	2007	Thin White Duke Dub	7:29
Gwen Stefani	"4 in the Morning"	2007	Thin White Duke Edit	4:55
Gwen Stefani	"What You Waiting For?"	2004	Jacques Lu Cont's TWD Mix	8:02
Gwen Stefani	"What You Waiting For?"	2004	Jacques Lu Cont's TWD Dub	8:22
Hawke	"Vivos En La Muerte"	1998	Les Rythmes Digitales Remix	?
Hot Chip	"Broken"	2022	Jacques Lu Cont Mix	4:10
Hot Chip	"Broken"	2022	Jacques Lu Cont Dub	5:20
Hot Natured	"Isis (Magic Carpet Ride)"	2013	Jacques Lu Cont Remix	5:56
Hurts	"Some Kind of Heaven"	2015	Thin White Duke Remix	5:36
Hurts	"Some Kind of Heaven"	2015	Thin White Duke Dub	6:05
John Dahlbäck	"Take This Thing Back"	2012	Jacques Lu Cont Remix	5:08
John Martin	"Anywhere For You"	2014	Stuart Price Version	3:09
Juliet	"Avalon"	2005	Jacques Lu Cont Versus Remix	6:36
Juliet	"Avalon"	2005	Jacques Lu Cont Versus Radio Mix	4:19
Juliet	"Ride The Pain"	2005	Jacques Lu Cont's Thin White Duke Remix	8:37
Juliet	"Ride The Pain"	2005	Jacques Lu Cont's Thin White Duke Radio Edit	4:23
Justice	"D.A.N.C.E."	2007	Stuart Price Remix	8:05
Justice	"D.A.N.C.E."	2007	Stuart Price Remix - Edit Version	4:57
Kasabian	"Me Plus One"	2007	Jacques Lu Cont Mix	8:35
Kasabian	"Me Plus One"	2007	Jacques Lu Cont Mix - Edit	4:56
Kasabian	"Me Plus One"	2007	Jacques Lu Cont Dub	8:18
Katy Perry	"Part of Me"	2012	Jacques Lu Cont's Thin White Duke Remix	6:02
Katy Perry	"Part of Me"	2012	Jacques Lu Cont's Thin White Duke Mixshow	5:57
Katy Perry	"Part of Me"	2012	Jacques Lu Cont's Thin White Duke Radio Edit	3:47
Keane	"Better Than This"	2009	Stuart Price Demo Mix	4:14
Kylie Minogue	"Get Outta My Way"	2010	SDP Extended Mix	5:40
Lady Gaga	"Paparazzi"	2009	Stuart Price Mix	3:21
Laptop	"Nothing To Declare"	1999	Les Rythmes Digitales Mix	4:13
Leroy Hanghofer	"Pin"	2000	Jacques Lu Cont & Sloop John Barillo Remix	6:18
Les Rythmes Digitales	"Jacques Your Body (Make Me Sweat)"	2005	Club Mix	6:27
Les Rythmes Digitales	"Jacques Your Body (Make Me Sweat)"	1999	'99 Mix	6:35
Les Rythmes Digitales	"Jacques Your Body (Make Me Sweat)"	1999	'99 Mix Edit / US Mix	3:30
Les Rythmes Digitales	"(Hey You) What's That Sound?"	1998	LRD Remix	4:27
Les Rythmes Digitales	"Music Makes You Lose Control"	1998	LRD Remix	5:55
Les Rythmes Digitales	"Sometimes"	1999	LRD Remix	5:53
Les Rythmes Digitales	"Sometimes"	1999	Zoot Woman Remix	3:19
Lhooq	"Losing Hand"	1998	Les Rythmes Digitales Remix	5:08
Lhooq	"Losing Hand"	1998	Les Rythmes Digitales Instrumental Remix	5:08
London Grammar	"If You Wait"	2014	Jacques Lu Cont Remix	6:25
Madonna	"Bring Your Love"	2026	Stuart Price Afterhours Mix	5:35
Madonna	"Bring Your Love"	2026	Afterhours Edit	4:44
Madonna	"Get Together"	2006	Jacques Lu Cont Mix	6:18
Madonna	"Get Together"	2006	Jacques Lu Cont Vocal Edit	4:23
Madonna	"Hollywood"	2003	Jacques Lu Cont's Thin White Duck Mix	7:09
Madonna	"Hollywood"	2003	Jacques Lu Cont's Thin White Duke Edit	3:57
Madonna	"Hung Up"	2005	SDP's Extended Dub	7:56
Madonna	"Hung Up"	2005	SDP's Extended Vocal	7:58
Madonna	"Hung Up"	2005	SDP's Extended Vocal Edit	4:57
Madonna	"I Love New York"	2006	Thin White Duke Mix	7:43
Madonna	"Jump"	2006	Jacques Lu Cont Mix	7:47
Madonna	"Jump"	2006	Jacques Lu Cont Edit	5:20
Madonna	"Let It Will Be"	2006	Paper Faces Mix	7:30
Madonna	"Let It Will Be"	2006	Paper Faces Vocal Edit	5:23
Madonna	"Miles Away"	2008	Thin White Duke Mix	6:11
Madonna	"Miles Away"	2008	Thin White Duke Edit	4:35
Madonna	"Sorry"	2006	Man With Guitar Mix	7:23
Madonna	"Sorry"	2006	Man With Guitar Edit	6:02
Madonna & Kylie Minogue	"Love Sensation"	2026	Afterhours Mix	6:15
Madonna & Kylie Minogue	"Love Sensation"	2026	Afterhours Radio Edit	3:36
Madonna & Kylie Minogue	"Love Sensation"	2026	Afterhours 7" Mix	?
Major Lazer	"Lay Your Head on Me"	2020	Jacques Lu Cont Vocal Mix	6:37
Major Lazer	"Lay Your Head on Me"	2020	Jacques Lu Cont Edit	3:35
Major Lazer	"Lay Your Head on Me"	2020	Jacques Lu Cont Instrumental Remix	6:37
Marshmello	"Be Kind"	2020	Jacques Lu Cont Remix	3:46
Medicine	"As You Do"	2004	Jacques Lu Cont Spoonful of Sugar Remix	2:47
Mekon	"Phatty's Lunchbox"	1997	Les Rythmes Digitales Remix	4:42
Mekon	"Skool's Out"	1997	Les Rythmes Digitales Remix	4:24
Metronomy	"Reservoir"	2014	Jacques Lu Cont Remix	6:28
Miike Snow	"Paddling Out"	2012	Jacques Lu Cont Remix	5:46
Miike Snow	"The Rabbit"	2010	Stuart Price Radio Mix	3:23
Mirwais	"Miss You"	2002	Thin White Duke Mix	4:08
Mirwais	"Miss You"	2002	Thin White Duke Edit	2:57
Mirwais	"Naive Song"	2000	Les Rythmes Digitales Remix	5:50
Missy Elliott	"Lose Control"	2005	Jacques Lu Cont Mix	7:46
Missy Elliott	"Lose Control"	2005	Jacques Lu Cont Dub	7:24
Missy Elliott	"Lose Control"	2005	Jacques Lu Cont Radio Edit	4:02
Mono	"Silicone"	1997	Les Rythmes Digitales Remix	5:07
m.o.v.e.	"Time Machine"	2000	Les Rythmes Digitales Remix	5:30
m.o.v.e.	"Time Machine"	2000	The Rubber Club Dub Remix	5:37
Muse	"Follow Me"	2012	Jacques Lu Cont's Thin White Duke Remix	5:55
Muse	"Undisclosed Desires"	2009	Thin White Duke Remix	7:45
Muse	"Undisclosed Desires"	2009	Thin White Duke Edit	4:53
New Order	"I Told You So"	2006	Stuart Price Remix	5:23
New Order	"I Told You So"	2013	Crazy World Mix	5:09
New Order	"Jetstream"	2005	Jacques Lu Cont Remix	8:21
New Order	"Jetstream"	2005	Jacques Lu Cont Remix - 2nd Mix	8:19
New Order	"Jetstream"	2005	Jacques Lu Cont Dub	8:25
No Doubt	"It's My Life"	2003	Jacques Lu Cont's Thin White Duke Mix	7:01
Orbital	"Nothing Left"	1999	Les Rythmes Digitales Remix	6:40
Pet Shop Boys	"Dreamland"	2019	TWD Vocal Remix	5:07
Pet Shop Boys	"Dreamland"	2019	TWD Dub	4:59
Pet Shop Boys	"Left To My Own Devices"	2017	Super Version	5:29
Pet Shop Boys	"Memory of the Future"	2012	New Single Mix	3:36
Pet Shop Boys	"Memory of the Future"	2012	New Single Mix Instrumental	3:36
Pet Shop Boys	"Memory of the Future"	2012	Stuart Price Extended Mix	5:23
Pet Shop Boys	"Say It to Me"	2016	Stuart Price Alternative Mix	3:36
Phoenix	"Too Young"	2000	Zoot Woman Mix	3:54
Placebo	"Pure Morning"	1998	Les Rythmes Digitales Remix	5:41
Placebo	"Slave to the Wage"	2000	Les Rythmes Digitales New Wave Mix	4:32
Ralph Myerz & The Jack Herren Band	"Casino"	2003	Zoot Woman Remix	3:12
Royksöpp	"This Must Be It"	2009	This Could Be Thin White Duke Mix	7:03
Royksöpp	"This Must Be It"	2009	This Could Be Thin White Duke Edit	3:26
Royksöpp	"What Else Is There?"	2005	Jacques Lu Cont Radio Mix	3:51
Royksöpp	"What Else Is There?"	2005	Thin White Duke Mix	8:27
Royksöpp	"What Else Is There?"	2005	Thin White Duke Edit	4:45
Scissor Sisters	"Comfortably Numb"	2004	Paper Faces Mix	8:29
Scissor Sisters	"Filthy/Gorgeous"	2005	Paper Faces Main Mix	8:46
Scissor Sisters	"Filthy/Gorgeous"	2005	Paper Faces Vocal Mix	7:55
Scissor Sisters	"Filthy/Gorgeous"	2005	Paper Faces Vocal Mix Edit	4:34
Scissor Sisters	"I Don't Feel Like Dancin'"	2006	Paper Faces Mix	6:36
Scissor Sisters	"Invisible Light"	2010	Stuart Price US 12" Remix	7:25
Scissor Sisters	"Laura"	2003	Paper Faces Mix	7:55
Seal	"Amazing"	2007	Thin White Duke Main	6:56
Seal	"Amazing"	2007	Thin White Duke Dub	6:54
Seal	"Amazing"	2007	Thin White Duke Edit	3:28
Sneaky Sound System	"It's Not My Problem"	2009	Thin White Duke Mix	7:49
Sneaky Sound System	"It's Not My Problem"	2009	Thin White Duke Mix Radio Edit	3:42
Snow Patrol	"Just Say Yes"	2009	Thin White Duke Remix Edit	4:14
Snow Patrol	"Just Say Yes"	2009	Thin White Duke Remix	7:27
Starsailor	"Four to the Floor"	2004	Thin White Duke Mix	8:13
Starsailor	"Four to the Floor"	2004	Thin White Duke Mix – Short Version	4:41
Starsailor	"Four to the Floor"	2004	Thin White Duke Radio Edit	3:31
Starsailor	"Tell Me It's Not Over"	2009	Thin White Duke Mix	5:28
Starsailor	"Tell Me It's Not Over"	2009	Stuart Price Remix	3:16
Steve Bug	"Drives Me Up The Wall"	1997	Les Rythmes Digitales Mix	6:53
Swedish House Mafia	"Heaven Takes You Home"	2022	Jacques Lu Cont Remix	6:24
Texas	"What About Us"	2006	Jacques Lu Cont Mix	7:38
Texas	"What About Us"	2006	Jacques Lu Cont Dub	7:08
Texas	"What About Us"	2006	Jacques Lu Cont Edit	4:22
The Dysfunctional Psychedelic Waltons	"Payback Time"	2003	Jacques Lu Cont's Thin White Duke Mix	6:43
The Dysfunctional Psychedelic Waltons	"Payback Time"	2003	Jacques Lu Cont's Thin White Duke Mix Edit	3:30
The Faint	"The Conductor"	2003	Thin White Duke Remix	7:53
The Killers	"Boy"	2022	Jacques Lu Cont Remix	5:58
The Killers	"Flesh and Bone"	2012	Jacques Lu Cont Remix	5:45
The Killers	"Human"	2008	Thin White Duke Club Mix	8:02
The Killers	"Human"	2008	Thin White Duke Dub	7:44
The Killers	"Human"	2008	Thin White Duke Edit	5:26
The Killers	"Mr. Brightside"	2003	Jacques Lu Cont's Thin White Duke Remix	8:50
The Killers	"Mr. Brightside"	2003	Jacques Lu Cont's Thin White Duke Dub	7:47
The Killers	"Mr. Brightside"	2003	Jacques Lu Cont's Thin White Duke Short Version	6:13
The Killers	"Mr. Brightside"	2003	Jacques Lu Cont's Thin White Duke Radio Mix	4:40
The Killers	"The Man"	2017	Jacques Lu Cont Remix	4:16
The Killers	"When You Were Young"	2006	Jacques Lu Cont's Thin White Duke Edit	3:58
The Killers	"When You Were Young"	2006	Jacques Lu Cont's Thin White Duke Mix	6:21
The Killers	"When You Were Young"	2006	Jacques Lu Cont's Thin White Duke Dub	6:22
The Knocks	"Trouble"	2017	Jacques Lu Cont Mix	6:06
The Hidden Cameras	"In the NA"	2009	Stuart Price Remix feat. Jake Shears	6:23
The Music	"Bleed From Within"	2004	Thin White Duke Mix	5:54
The Music	"Bleed From Within"	2004	Thin White Duke Dub	7:30
Themroc	"Gold Is Your Metal"	2002	Paper Faces Mix	6:46
Tiga	"Plush"	2012	Jacques Lu Cont Remix	3:19
Tiga	"Plush"	2012	Jacques Lu Cont Extended Remix	4:35
U2	"Even Better Than The Real Thing"	2011	Jacques Lu Cont Mix	6:42
We in music	"Now That Love Has Gone"	2001	From: Happiness To: Loneliness Mix by Les Rythmes Digitales	5:27
Whirlpool Productions	"From: Disco To: Disco"	1999	Les Rythmes Digitales Remix	6:34
Whirlpool Productions	"From: Disco To: Disco"	1999	Les Rythmes Digitales Remix Edit	3:28
Zoot Woman	"It's Automatic"	2001	Paper Faces Mix	5:49
Zoot Woman	"Living in a Magazine"	2001	Paper Faces Mix	7:12
Zoot Woman	"Grey Day"	2003	Paper Faces Mix	7:12
Zoot Woman	"Gem"	2004	Paper Faces Remix	7:47
Zoot Woman	"Things Are What They Used To Be"	2009	Desire Mix	5:07
Zoot Woman	"The Stars Are Bright"	2014	Stripped Mix	2:57
Zoot Woman	"The Stars Are Bright"	2014	Startro Mix	3:59
