= The Fear Inside =

The Fear Inside may refer to:

- The Fear Inside (film)
- The Fear Inside (song)
