= Distant Past =

Distant Past may refer to:

- "Distant Past" (song), by Everything Everything
- Distant Past (album), by Monster Magnet (2001)
- Distant Past (Desperate Housewives)
