= James Sutton =

James Sutton may refer to:

- James Sutton (MP) (c. 1733–1801), Member of Parliament for Devizes, 1765–1780
- James Sutton (Shardlow) (1799–1868), canal carrier and High Sheriff
- James Patrick Sutton (1915–2005), United States Congressman from Tennessee
- James Sutton (actor) (born 1983), English television actor
- James Sutton (racing driver) (born 1985), English racing car driver
- Jam Sutton (born 1986), photographer and director
- Jim Sutton (born 1941), New Zealand politician
- James Sutton a.k.a. James Files (born 1942), alleged participant in the assassination of John F. Kennedy
