= Ready to Love =

Ready to Love may refer to:

- "Ready to Love", a song by After School from the "Diva" single
- "Ready to Love", a song by Katrina Woolverton
- "Ready to Love", a song by Scott Stapp from The Space Between the Shadows
- "Ready to Love", a song by Seventeen from the album Your Choice
- Ready to Love, an EP by Harmony Samuels
- Ready to Love, a 2018 American reality television series on OWN
