= Jam Sutton =

- Born: James Sutton; 1986 (age 39–40); United Kingdom
- Known for: Visual Artist
- Website: www.jamsutton.com

James Sutton (born 1986 in United Kingdom), known as Jam Sutton, is an English visual artist.

== Career ==
Sutton's clients include will.i.am, Natalia Kills, Steve Aoki, Keri Hilson, Space Cowboy, Nadia Oh, Azealia Banks, Master Shortie, Ministry of Sound, The Fratellis, Pharrell Williams's band N*E*R*D and labels Cherrytree Records (Interscope/Universal), Sony Music.

Jam's work has been published and displayed throughout the world in exhibitions, magazines, album artwork, television broadcasts and blogs (Hypebeast / Kanye West / Flylyf / Grafik Mag). He has also taken part in shows in the UK, Italy and Spain.

== This Is Not Clothing ==
Jam Sutton is the founder and main designer for a line of clothing ranging from surrealism to pop art. WUW magazine said: "James has worked on a streetwear clothing line which is already creating a buzz behind the scenes".

== Awards ==
- He earned two commendations at the D&AD (Design & Art Direction) Student awards held in London in 2007
- In 2007, he was a finalist in the category of "Live Motion" at the Adobe Design Achievement Awards held in San Francisco.
- Awarded an honorary membership to the International Society of Typographic Designers, following recognition at the ISTD Awards 2007.

== Exhibitions ==
=== Solo ===
- Coventry - Photo Show - Venice Fashion Photography (May 2007)
- Apo + Theo + Osis - Photo Show - Taller de Marcs - Barcelona, Spain (September 2012)
- Looking back, seeing forward. - Artwork Show - Glassworks - Amsterdam, Netherlands (July 2015)

== Design ==
- 2008: will.i.am - "New Day" (graphical post production) (Interscope)
- 2011: Frankmusik - Do It in the AM - Album cover and artwork Island Records
- 2011: N*E*R*D - Nothing - Album cover, photography and visual art (Star Trak Entertainment, Interscope Records)

== Music videos ==
- 2007: The Fratellis - "Flathead" (CherryTree Records Interscope Records)
- 2007: Space Cowboy - My Egyptian Lover (feat. Nadia Oh)(Tiger Trax)
- 2007: Space Cowboy - "Running Away" (Tiger Trax)
- 2007: Nadia Oh - "Something 4 the Weekend"" (Tiger Trax)
- 2008: Nadia Oh - "N.A.D.I.A O.H" (Tiger Trax)
- 2008: Nadia Oh - "Got Your Number" (Tiger Trax)
- 2008: Natalia Cappuccini - "Real Woman" (Interscope)
- 2009: Steve Aoki ft. Zuper Blahq - "I'm in the House" (Dim Mak Ministry of Sound)
- 2009: Master Shortie - "Bringing It Back" (Odd One Out Music)
- 2010: Natalia Kills - "Love, Kills xx" Episodes 1, 2 + 3 (Season 2) (Interscope)
- 2011: Zuper Blahq AKA will.i.am - "Dance" (will.i.am Music Group)
- 2012: Steve Aoki ft. Kid Cudi & Travis Barker - "Cudi The Kid" (Ultra Records)
- 2013: Azealia Banks - "Yung Rapunxel"
