= A List =

Play by Gertrude Stein

A List is a play by American writer Gertrude Stein, written in 1923 and first published in Operas and Plays in 1932. It is structured in six parts, each labeled as a numbered or alphabetized "List," and has seven characters: Martha, Maryas, Marius, Mabel, Mary, Martin, and May. There are no explicit stage directions, but names in the side text are frequently joined with an ampersand or the word "and." Stein said that the play was based on Avery Hopwood's play Our Little Wife (1916).

== Synopsis ==
A list lost reminds her of a fire lost. Smoke is not black nor if you turn your back is a fire burned if you are near woods which abundantly supply wood.

— Gertrude Stein, A List

The play does not contain an easily discernible plot. However, pairings of characters and the accumulation of new characters suggest strained relationships between Martha and Maryas and between Mabel and Marius, and later a furtive relationship between Maryras and Mary. The language of marriage and separation, and of knowledge and travel, is frequently invoked. Many allusions, including those to mountains, cows, and baskets, tie A List to other works by Stein, as do techniques of Punning, repetition, and listing.

== Analysis ==
A List is considered to fall under the category of Stein's landscape plays. In her lecture "Plays," Stein excerpts the play following an explanation of syncopated emotions:

I felt that if a play was exactly like a landscape then there would be no difficulty about the emotion of the person looking on at the play being behind or ahead of the play because the landscape does not have to make acquaintance. You may have to make acquaintance with it, but it does not with you, it is there and so the play being written the relation between you at any time is so exactly that that it is of no importance unless you look at it.

Astrid Lorange analyzes Stein's landscape label as "a moment of performative definition, from which a particular kind of attention emerges: an attention to the relation of objects and events in a space of time." Jane Palatini Bowers modifies the concept to further emphasize the topographical dimension. In her analysis of A List, she focuses on Stein's spatial play of language on the page itself, calling it a "lang-scape".

Stein's strategies in the play include what Daniela Miranda identify as those she uses throughout her oeuvre "to construct the continuous present—recreation, using everything, insistence, and beginning again and again" and that "ultimately lead to a destabilization of normative time by denying the reader the possibility of closure, progress, and intelligibility." Miranda's account extends the presentation of queerness from the content of the play to its structure as well.

== Performance history ==
Student theatre company Cap & Bells mounted A List at Williams College in December 2016.

No performances are listed in the appendices of Sarah Bay-Cheng's Mama Dada.

Radio Free Stein workshopped the play in Amsterdam on August 12, 2017.

Muhlenberg College Dept of Theater & Dance produced "A List" in April 2021, directed by James Peck and featuring Molly Menner as Martha and Savannah Connelly as Maryas.
