= For You (Frankmusik album) =

Studio album by Frankmusik
- Released: 9 October 2015
- Recorded: 2015
- Genre: Synthpop
- Label: Self-released
- Producer: Frankmusik

Frankmusik chronology
| By Nicole (2014) | For You (2015) | Carissimi (2021) |

Singles from For You
- 1. "This" Released: 7 May 2015; 2. "I Remember" Released: 9 October 2015; 3. "Awake" Released: 21 December 2015; 4. "Turnin'" Released: 17 May 2016

For You is the fifth studio album by English recording artist Frankmusik. The album was released digitally on 9 October 2015 and streamed via Spotify.

The album is preceded by the release of the promotional single "This", which along its music video was premiered on May 4, 2015. The music video for the official lead single "I Remember", directed by Danny Land, was revealed the same day the album came out.

== Track listing ==
All songs written and produced by Frankmusik.

| No. | Title | Length |
|---|---|---|
| 1. | "Awake" | 3:50 |
| 2. | "I Remember" | 3:18 |
| 3. | "Love Again" | 3:37 |
| 4. | "Lexus" | 3:54 |
| 5. | "Ground" | 3:38 |
| 6. | "Sometimes" | 3:56 |
| 7. | "Mistress" | 4:45 |
| 8. | "Show" | 3:39 |
| 9. | "Cosmic Rendezvous" | 3:35 |
| 10. | "Never Left" | 3:36 |
| 11. | "Say Goodbye" | 3:59 |
| 12. | "Majestic" | 4:04 |
| 13. | "Turnin'" | 4:03 |
| 14. | "Know My Name" | 4:04 |
| 15. | "This" | 3:46 |
