= Carissimi (album) =

Studio album by Frankmusik
- Released: 8 November 2021
- Recorded: 2021
- Genre: Synthpop
- Length: 47:44 (physical) 103:00 (digital)
- Label: All in (Self-released)
- Producer: Frankmusik

Frankmusik chronology
| For You (2015) | Carissimi (2021) | Completed (2022) |

Carissimi is the sixth studio album by English recording artist Frankmusik. This is a project album where Turner released a song every last day of the month. To Announce these 12 months / 12 songs a short video teaser has been done on his social media. The album was physically released on the 8 November 2021 and digitally on 1 January 2022 and streamed via Spotify Only a hundred signed copies were sold as CD pack on 8 November 2021 thought his social media.

For this project album no video or lead single was definited. The digital album is available with instrumentals songs. It also contains a previously unreleased track called "Do What" from 2019.

== Visuals ==
Once again Avisuals designed the covers and the teaser videos. This long visual collaboration ended with a very much Bjork inspired typingfont for the Frankmusik logo and titles. Colourful designed 3D symbols were also representing the song covers.

== Track listing ==
All songs written and produced by Frankmusik.

Carissimi – Physical Edition
| No. | Title | Month Release | Length |
|---|---|---|---|
| 1. | "People Go" | January 31, 2021 | 4:11 |
| 2. | "This Way" | February 28, 2021 | 3:37 |
| 3. | "Alone" | March 31, 2021 | 4:08 |
| 4. | "All I See" | April 30, 2021 | 4:16 |
| 5. | "GTMH" | May 31, 2021 | 4:11 |
| 6. | "LA Thing" | June 30, 2021 | 4:28 |
| 7. | "Satellite" | July 31, 2021 | 4:54 |
| 8. | "Into The Sun" | August 31, 2021 | 4:09 |
| 9. | "Question" | September 30, 2021 | 3:58 |
| 10. | "Weather Man" | October 31, 2021 | 4:28 |
| 11. | "Gold" | November 30, 2021 | 3:29 |
| 12. | "Next" | December 31, 2021 | 4:05 |
| Total length: | | | 43:44 |

Carissimi – Digital Edition
| No. | Title | Month Release | Length |
|---|---|---|---|
| 13. | "People Go (instrumental)" | January 31, 2021 | 4:11 |
| 14. | "This Way (instrumental)" | February 28, 2021 | 3:37 |
| 15. | "Alone (instrumental)" | March 31, 2021 | 4:08 |
| 16. | "All I See (instrumental)" | April 30, 2021 | 4:16 |
| 17. | "GTMH (instrumental)" | May 31, 2021 | 4:11 |
| 18. | "LA Thing (instrumental)" | June 30, 2021 | 4:28 |
| 19. | "Satellite (instrumental)" | July 31, 2021 | 4:54 |
| 20. | "Into The Sun (instrumental)" | August 31, 2021 | 4:09 |
| 21. | "Question (instrumental)" | September 30, 2021 | 3:58 |
| 22. | "Weather Man (instrumental)" | October 31, 2021 | 4:28 |
| 23. | "Gold (instrumental)" | November 30, 2021 | 3:29 |
| 24. | "Next (instrumental)" | December 31, 2021 | 4:05 |
| 25. | "Do What (Bonus Track)" | December 31, 2021 | 4:06 |
| Total length: | | | 103:00 |
