= When I Start To (Break It All Down) =

2011 single by Erasure

Single by Erasure

from the album Tomorrow's World
- B-side: "Tomorrow's World"
- Released: 23 September 2011
- Genre: Synth-pop; electronic
- Length: 3:34
- Label: Mute
- Songwriters: Andy Bell; Vince Clarke
- Producer: Frankmusik

Erasure singles chronology
"A Little Respect" (HMI Redux) (2010)	"When I Start To (Break It All Down)" (2011)	"Be with You" (2011)

Music video
- "When I Start To (Break It All Down)" on YouTube

"When I Start To (Break It All Down)" is a song by English synth-pop duo Erasure, released in 2011 as the lead single from their fourteenth studio album Tomorrow's World. The song was written by Andy Bell and Vince Clarke, and produced by Frankmusik.

"When I Start To (Break It All Down)" reached number 172 in the UK Singles Chart in October 2011. It was Erasure's first eligible single (discounting remixed versions of hit singles) since their formation in 1985 not to reach the UK top 100. In November 2011, the song peaked at number 25 on the US Billboard Dance/Club Play Songs chart.

== Background ==
"When I Start To (Break It All Down)" had the demo title "Tender" as it was loosely based on Elvis Presley's "Love Me Tender". Clarke described the finished track as "sound[ing] like Tears for Fears".

== Release ==
"You've Got to Save Me Right Now" was originally due to be the first single from Tomorrow's World until "When I Start To (Break It All Down)" replaced it at short notice. Bell stated, "Usually we don't choose the singles, you kind of have an instinctive feeling sometimes. In this instance, "When I Start To (Break It All Down)" took over from "Save Me" because we thought the song had gone in the direction that sounded really good."

Prior to its release as a single on 23 September 2011, the song received its first play on BBC Radio 2 on 15 August.

Nine remixes were created for the track, not including the album, radio edit and single versions. Four of the remixes were created by the House music duo Steve Smart & Westfunk, three remixes by German DJ/producer Kris Menace, one by Little Loud and one by Frankmusik. The B-side "Tomorrow's World" is an instrumental track, exclusive to the single and written by Richard Denton and Martin Cook. The track was originally recorded in 1980 as the theme for the BBC TV series of the same name.

== Music video ==
Mute Records released a live video clip as the song's official music video. This clip used footage filmed during the duo's Total Pop Tour in the summer of 2011, with much of the footage coming from the first of two Dublin gigs played in June 2011. The video premiered on YouTube on 18 November 2011. In addition, an official rehearsal video was uploaded onto YouTube in early September, featuring the duo in London rehearsing the song prior to the Tomorrow's World tour.

== Critical reception ==
In a review of Tomorrow's World, David Jeffries of AllMusic commented, "Fans get to experience Vince Clarke's fingerprints on 'Fill Us with Fire' and 'When I Start To (Break It All Down),' as the recent reunion of his Yaz project is reflected in the nocturnal synth pop and soul muscle driving these highlights."

== Track listing ==
CD single (UK and Europe)

1. "When I Start To (Break It All Down)" – 3:34
2. "Tomorrow's World" – 4:18
3. "When I Start To (Break It All Down)" (Steve Smart & Westfunk Main Room Mix Edit) – 4:23
4. "When I Start To (Break It All Down)" (Kris Menace Remix) – 5:24
5. "When I Start To (Break It All Down)" (Little Loud Remix) – 4:36

CD promotional single (Europe)

1. "When I Start To (Break It All Down)" (Single Version) – 3:33
2. "When I Start To (Break It All Down)" (Steve Smart & Westfunk Main Room Radio Edit) – 4:04

CD promotional single (UK)

1. "When I Start To (Break It All Down)" (Radio Version) – 3:45

CD promotional single (Greece)

1. "When I Start To (Break It All Down)" (Single Version) – 3:34
2. "When I Start To (Break It All Down)" (Album Version) – 3:45
3. "When I Start To (Break It All Down)" (Steve Smart & Westfunk Main Room Radio Edit) – 4:02
4. "When I Start To (Break It All Down)" (Steve Smart & Westfunk Main Room Edit) – 4:20
5. "When I Start To (Break It All Down)" (Steve Smart & Westfunk Club Mix) – 6:19
6. "When I Start To (Break It All Down)" (Steve Smart & Westfunk Main Room Dub Mix) – 6:19
7. "When I Start To (Break It All Down)" (Kris Menace Club Remix) – 5:12
8. "When I Start To (Break It All Down)" (Kris Menace Remix) – 5:23

CD promotional single (US)

1. "When I Start To (Break It All Down)" (Steve Smart & Westfunk Main Room Edit) – 4:21
2. "When I Start To (Break It All Down)" (Steve Smart & Westfunk Club Mix) – 6:19
3. "When I Start To (Break It All Down)" (Steve Smart & Westfunk Main Room Dub) – 6:19
4. "When I Start To (Break It All Down)" (Kris Menace Remix) – 5:12
5. "When I Start To (Break It All Down)" (Kris Menace Club Remix) – 5:23
6. "When I Start To (Break It All Down)" (Little Loud Remix) – 4:34

CD promotional single (UK)

1. "When I Start To (Break It All Down)" (Radio Edit) – 3:35
2. "When I Start To (Break It All Down)" (Album Version) – 3:45
3. "When I Start To (Break It All Down)" (Steve Smart & Westfunk Edit) – 4:20
4. "When I Start To (Break It All Down)" (Steve Smart & Westfunk Mix) – 6:18
5. "When I Start To (Break It All Down)" (Steve Smart & Westfunk Dub) – 6:18
6. "When I Start To (Break It All Down)" (Kris Menace Remix) – 5:11
7. "When I Start To (Break It All Down)" (Kris Menace Club Remix) – 5:22
8. "When I Start To (Break It All Down)" (Kris Menace Instrumental) – 3:31
9. "When I Start To (Break It All Down)" (Little Loud Remix) – 4:36
10. "When I Start To (Break It All Down)" (Frankmusik Remix) – 4:58
11. "Tomorrow's World" – 4:15

== Personnel ==
- Andy Bell – vocals
- Vince Clarke – keyboards, piano, producer and programming on "Tomorrow's World"
- Frankmusik – producer, remixer, keyboards, programming
- Robert Orton – mixer
- Timothy "Q" Wiles – mixer of "Tomorrow's World"
- Neil Quinlan – assistant engineer
- Steve Smart & Westfunk, Kris Menace, Little Loud – remixes
- Danny Dove, Steve Smart – keyboards on "Steve Smart & Westfunk Main Room Mix Edit"
- Christoph Hoeffel, Walter Schmidt – drums and keyboards on "Kris Menace Remix"
- Tom Hingston Studio – design
- Kate Macdowell – design (sculptures)
- Dan Kvitka – photography

== Charts ==
Chart (2011)	Peak position
UK Singles Chart	172
US Billboard Dance/Club Play Songs Chart	25
