= Tomorrow's World (album) =

Studio album by Erasure
- Released: 3 October 2011
- Studio: RAK (London)
- Genre: Synth-pop
- Length: 31:38
- Label: Mute
- Producer: Frankmusik

Erasure chronology
Light at the End of the World (2007)	Tomorrow's World (2011)	Snow Globe (2013)

Singles from Tomorrow's World
- 1. "When I Start To (Break It All Down)" Released: 23 September 2011; 2. "Be with You" Released: 21 November 2011; 3. "A Whole Lotta Love Run Riot" Released: 9 March 2012; 4. "Fill Us with Fire" Released: 12 March 2012

Tomorrow's World is the fourteenth studio album by English synth-pop duo Erasure, released by Mute Records in the United Kingdom on 3 October 2011 and in North America on 11 October 2011. As with their previous album, Light at the End of the World (2007), Tomorrow's World reached number 29 on the UK Albums Chart.

The album was written in New York, London, and at Vince Clarke's cabin studio in Maine, between January and June 2011, following Erasure's short break, which found Andy Bell recording and releasing his second solo album Non-Stop (2010), and Vince Clarke reuniting with former Yazoo bandmate Alison Moyet for the Reconnected tour. Clarke used his vintage collection of analog synths for the final touches. All songs are written by Bell and Clarke. The album was produced by Frankmusik and mixed by Rob Orton.

The first single from the album was "When I Start To (Break It All Down)", which was released on 23 September 2011. It received its first UK airplay on BBC Radio 2's Ken Bruce show. "Be with You", the album's second single reached number seven on the US Hot Dance Club Songs chart. "A Whole Lotta Love Run Riot" was released as the third single in Germany as a digital download only. "Fill Us with Fire" was released as the third single on 12 March 2012.

In 2016, to follow BMG's celebration of the band's 30th anniversary in releasing all previous albums on vinyl (both reissues and first-ever pressings), Tomorrow's World was also issued for the first time on vinyl in an extended two-LP set of which the first pressings were on lilac vinyl. The second disc contained a selection of B-sides and remixes taken from the single releases.

== Critical reception ==
Professional ratings
Aggregate scores
Source	Rating
AnyDecentMusic?	5.1/10
Metacritic	62/100
Review scores
Source	Rating
AllMusic	3.5/5 stars
Consequence of Sound	3/5 stars
The Daily Telegraph	2/5 stars
Entertainment Weekly	83/100
The Independent	Favorable
musicOMH	3.5/5 stars
Now	3/5 stars
The Observer	2/5 stars
PopMatters	6/10
Rolling Stone	3/5 stars

Upon release, AllMusic felt that the duo's collaboration with Frankmusik was a "wise choice", adding "the results are generally quite good, sometimes excellent". They concluded: "There's a cohesiveness issue that keeps this one off their top shelf, but Erasure have settled nicely into that groove that the best veteran bands often do. Last time out it was the vital release while this time it's the very attractive diversion, adding new flavors to a group that sounds much more inspired than you'd expect at this point." The Independent described the album as "gentle, blissful and devoid of the exuberant electro romps of yesteryear", and felt Bell's voice displayed "less vibrato" and "more control". MusicOMH wrote "Tomorrow's World appeals to fans of Erasure's later albums just as much as it appeases those who swooned along to "A Little Respect" in 1988."

No Ripcord believed the album to be "updated take on how you'd expect an Erasure record to sound: accessible songs, flamboyant vocals and fizzing synths". They added: "Tomorrow's World isn't a bad album but it's not a complete 'return to form' either. Its strength is having enough of a sense of songcraft to add weight to the keening, theatrical melodrama of Andy Bell's vocals." The Daily Telegraph noted the album was "full of hi-NRG anthems, cheesy pop-house and Tigger-ish bounce. Business as usual, then, with few new thrills."

The Guardian commented: "...stuffed with big, bright synthetic dance tracks straining for "feelgood": floor-fillers by numbers, were they not dull to the point of paralysing. Even with Frankmusik included among the production credits, these one-time synth-pop pioneers sound lifeless compared with all the 80s-raiding whippersnappers so indebted to them." Consequence of Sound wrote "The duo's 14th studio album is an archetypal example of upbeat, affirming, fist-pumping synthpop, and an example of the highest order – but it doesn't sound very original at all. Not any more. Tomorrow's World doesn't let us down; if you want an example of the first wave of synthpop and excellently crafted, catchy dance music, there aren't many better than Erasure, and this is another album that affirms their reputation."

NOW felt the duo's "swooshing melodies" and "yearning lyrics" were suited to the "epic builds, vocal effects and fist-pumping energy of American dance pop". They concluded: "Bell's soaring tenor sounds positively elated by the thunderous beats and delivers with full force on every track. In fact, sometimes it feels like he's competing too hard with the intensity of the big, expensive-sounding production. Then again it's all about the pop hits with Erasure, and when Bell connects with a hook, the effect is heady."

== Track listing ==
All tracks are written by Andy Bell and Vince Clarke.

No.	Title	Length
1.	"Be with You"	3:33
2.	"Fill Us with Fire"	3:16
3.	"What Will I Say When You're Gone?"	3:42
4.	"You've Got to Save Me Right Now"	2:52
5.	"A Whole Lotta Love Run Riot"	3:46
6.	"When I Start To (Break It All Down)"	3:43
7.	"I Lose Myself"	3:15
8.	"Then I Go Twisting"	3:51
9.	"Just When I Thought It Was Ending"	3:40

iTunes Store bonus track
No.	Title	Length
10.	"Shot to the Heart"	3:17

Deluxe edition bonus disc
No.	Title	Length
1.	"I Lose Myself (No Self Control Mix by Gareth Jones)"	7:29
2.	"Give Me Life"	5:00
3.	"Fill Us with Fire (Fired Up Mix by Gareth Jones)"	7:22
4.	"When I Start To (Break It All Down) (Frankmusik Remix)"	4:58
5.	"Clash (I Lose Myself)" (demo version)	3:22
6.	"Big Song (Fill Us with Fire)" (demo version)	3:10
7.	"Major 7th (Be with You)" (demo version)	3:23
8.	"Save Me (You've Got to Save Me Right Now)" (demo version)	2:35

2016 limited edition vinyl issue (second disc)
No.	Title	Length
1.	"Tomorrow's World" (B-side to "When I Start To (Break It All Down)")	4:18
2.	"Never Let You Down" (B-side to "Be With You")	3:31
3.	"Shot to the Heart" (B-side to "Fill Us with Fire")	3:17
4.	"Give Me Life"	5:00
5.	"When I Start To (Break It All Down) (Kris Menace Club Remix)"	5:23
6.	"Be with You (Love Is Coming)"	6:57
7.	"Fill Us with Fire (JRMX Club Remix)"	7:23

== Charts ==
Chart performance for Tomorrow's World
Chart (2011)	Peak position
Czech Albums (ČNS IFPI)	26
Danish Albums (Hitlisten)	20
German Albums (Offizielle Top 100)	35
Scottish Albums (OCC)	32
UK Albums (OCC)	29
US Billboard 200	61
US Independent Albums (Billboard)	11
US Top Dance Albums (Billboard)	6
