= Fill Us with Fire =

2012 single by Erasure

Single by Erasure

from the album Tomorrow's World
- B-side: "Shot to the Heart"
- Released: 12 March 2012
- Genre: Synth-pop; electronic
- Length: 3:17
- Label: Mute
- Songwriters: Andy Bell; Vince Clarke
- Producers: Frankmusik; Vince Clarke ("Shot to the Heart")

Erasure singles chronology
"Be with You" (2011)	"Fill Us with Fire" (2012)	"Gaudete" (2013)

"Fill Us with Fire" is a single by English synth-pop duo Erasure, released as the third single from their 2011 album Tomorrow's World. The song was written by Andy Bell and Vince Clarke, whilst it was produced by electropop musician Frankmusik who produced the rest of the Tomorrow's World album. The B-side "Shot to the Heart" was also written by the duo, but produced by Clarke. This was the final single from Tomorrow's World in all territories except Germany, where "A Whole Lotta Love Run Riot" was released as a download single only.

== Track listings ==
CD single (UK and Europe) CD MUTE 479

1. "Fill Us with Fire" (Single Mix) – 3:17
2. "Shot to the Heart" – 3:17
3. "Fill Us with Fire" ("Fired Up" Mix by Gareth Jones) – 7:22
4. "A Whole Lotta Love Run Riot" (Wayne G & Andy Allder Atlantis Anthem) – 7:28
5. "Fill Us with Fire" (JRMX Club) – 7:23
6. "A Whole Lotta Love Run Riot" (XOQ Remix) – 5:47
7. "Fill Us with Fire" (Liam Keegan Remix) – 6:08
8. "Be with You" (Yiannis Unruly Mix) – 7:35
