= Confusion Girl =

Single by Frankmusik

from the album Complete Me
- B-side: "It's a Sin" "Such Great Heights"
- Released: 19 July 2009
- Genre: Electropop
- Length: 3.01
- Label: Island
- Songwriter(s): Vincent James Turner
- Producer(s): Stuart Price

Frankmusik singles chronology
"Better Off as Two" (2009)	"Confusion Girl" (2009)	"I Got Soul" (2009)

'Confusion Girl' is a song by British electropop singer Frankmusik from his debut album Complete Me, which was released on 3 August 2009.

== Song information ==
The song was released on 19 July 2009 and received significant airplay. It featured on Radio 1's 'A List' prior to its release.

== Music video ==
The music video consists of Frankmusik (real name Vincent Frank) walking around town trying to find the woman he had lost, played by Holly Valance, whom he tracks down by the end of the video.

The video shows him being completely oblivious to what is going on around him, as he is so caught up in his search for his love interest.

It was filmed on location in Mile End Park and Clinton Road, Mile End, London.

== Track listings and formats ==
UK CD single

1. Confusion Girl
2. Confusion Girl (vs Tinchy Stryder)
3. It's a Sin (Pet Shop Boys Cover)
4. Confusion Girl (Original Demo Version)

Digital Download 1 (iTunes) Confusion Girl (Shame Shame Shame) - Single

1. Confusion Girl
2. Such Great Heights (The Postal Service Cover)

Digital Download 2 (iTunes) Confusion Girl (Shame Shame Shame) EP

1. Confusion Girl (Radio Edit)
2. Confusion Girl (Tinchy Stryder version)
3. Confusion Girl (Riffs and Rays remix feat. Tinchy Stryder)
4. Confusion Girl (Confused Boy Dub) knob boy
5. Confusion Girl (Crimes Against Disco Remix)
6. Confusion Girl (Don Diablo Loves to Slowdance remix)

== Charts ==
The song entered the UK Singles Chart at number 29 on 26 July 2009.

Chart (2009)	Peak position
UK Singles (OCC)	27
