= Complete Me =

2009 studio album by Frankmusik

Studio album by Frankmusik
- Released: 31 July 2009
- Genre: Electropop; synth-pop; dance-pop
- Length: 45:23
- Label: Island
- Producer: Frankmusik; David Norland; Stuart Price; Fraser T Smith; Mark Taylor; Jeremy Wheatley

Frankmusik chronology
| Complete Me (2009) | Do It in the AM (2011) |

Alternative cover
- Completely Me cover

Singles from Complete Me
- 1. "In Step"/"Done Done" Released: 2 June 2008; 2. "3 Little Words" Released: 23 November 2008; 3. "Better Off as Two" Released: 12 April 2009; 4. "Confusion Girl" Released: 19 July 2009

Professional ratings
Aggregate scores
| Source | Rating |
|---|---|
| Metacritic | (62/100) |
Review scores
| Source | Rating |
| AllMusic | 4/5 stars |
| BBC Music | (mixed) |
| Clash | (8/10) |
| Drowned in Sound | (2/10) |
| The Guardian | 4/5 stars |
| The Independent | (positive) |
| Metro | 4/5 stars |
| musicOMH | 4/5 stars |
| NME | (1/10) |
| The Times | 4/5 stars |

Complete Me is the debut studio album by English recording artist Frankmusik. It was released in the United Kingdom on 3 August 2009 by Island Records. A deluxe edition, released on the same day in both CD and digital formats, included a bonus CD titled "Re-Complete Me", containing the full album remixed and re-edited by Frankmusik himself into one continuous 38-minute DJ set. An acoustic version of the album titled Completely Me was released digitally on 6 December 2009. New versions of the songs were monthly released through the year 2022 as a new version album called Completed.

== Track listing ==
| No. | Title | Writer(s) | Producer(s) | Length |
|---|---|---|---|---|
| 1. | "In Step" | Vincent Turner | Frankmusik; Jeremy Wheatley* | 3:40 |
| 2. | "Better Off as 2" | Turner | Frankmusik; Stuart Price; Wheatley* | 2:56 |
| 3. | "Gotta Boyfriend?" | Turner | Frankmusik; Price | 3:20 |
| 4. | "Confusion Girl" | Turner | Frankmusik; Price; David Norland*; Fraser T Smith* | 2:59 |
| 5. | "Your Boy" | Turner | Frankmusik; Price | 2:41 |
| 6. | "When You're Around" | Turner; Hugh Cornwell; Jean-Jacques Burnel; Dave Greenfield; Jet Black | Frankmusik; Price; Mark Taylor* | 2:51 |
| 7. | "3 Little Words" | Turner | Frankmusik; Price; Taylor* | 2:50 |
| 8. | "Wonder Woman" | Turner | Frankmusik; Price; Wheatley* | 2:57 |
| 9. | "Complete Me" | Turner | Frankmusik; Price | 2:56 |
| 10. | "Vacant Heart" | Turner; David Norland; Giacomo Puccini; Stephen Hague; Walter Turbitt; Malcolm McLaren | Norland; Frankmusik | 3:31 |
| 11. | "Time Will Tell" | Turner; Steven Young; Martin Young | Frankmusik; Price | 3:08 |
| 12. | "Done Done" | Turner | Frankmusik | 3:42 |
| 13. | "Run Away from Trouble" | Turner | Frankmusik; Price | 4:20 |
| 14. | "Olivia" (hidden track; added onto the end of track 13) | Turner | Frankmusik | 3:32 |

UK iTunes bonus tracks
| No. | Title | Writer(s) | Length |
|---|---|---|---|
| 14. | "My Mind" | Turner | 3:54 |
| 15. | "3 Little Words" (video) | | 2:59 |
| 16. | "Better Off as 2" (video) | | 3:04 |

Deluxe edition bonus CD: Re-Complete Me
| No. | Title | Length |
|---|---|---|
| 1. | "3 Little Words" | 3:21 |
| 2. | "In Step" | 3:48 |
| 3. | "Confusion Girl" | 3:27 |
| 4. | "Better Off as 2" | 3:42 |
| 5. | "Wonder Woman" | 3:26 |
| 6. | "Complete Me" | 3:28 |
| 7. | "Gotta Boyfriend?" | 3:17 |
| 8. | "Time Will Tell" | 3:22 |
| 9. | "Your Boy" | 2:34 |
| 10. | "Done Done" | 3:01 |
| 11. | "Run Away from Trouble" | 4:10 |

(*) denotes additional producer

Notes

- "When You're Around" is an adaptation of "Golden Brown" by The Stranglers.
- "Vacant Heart" contains elements from "Madam Butterfly (Un bel dì vedremo)" by Malcolm McLaren.
- "Time Will Tell" contains elements from "Pump Up the Volume" by MARRS.

=== Completely Me ===
The acoustic version of the album, titled Completely Me, was released digitally on 6 December 2009 containing the same track listing as that of the standard album (except for "When You're Around"), but each song was re-recorded and stripped down. As such, the running time for each song differs from the original release.

| No. | Title | Length |
|---|---|---|
| 1. | "In Step" | 3:39 |
| 2. | "Better Off as 2" | 2:50 |
| 3. | "Gotta Boyfriend?" | 3:17 |
| 4. | "Confusion Girl" | 3:20 |
| 5. | "Your Boy" | 2:42 |
| 6. | "3 Little Words" | 3:20 |
| 7. | "Wonder Woman" | 2:50 |
| 8. | "Complete Me" | 3:04 |
| 9. | "Vacant Heart" | 3:07 |
| 10. | "Time Will Tell" | 3:12 |
| 11. | "Done Done" | 3:43 |
| 12. | "Run Away from Trouble" | 3:46 |

== Personnel ==
Complete Me 2009

- Frankmusik – vocals, producer, executive producer; additional producer (track 10)
- Beatriz Artola – engineer (track 4)
- Tom Beard – cover photography
- Tim Debney – mastering
- Richard Edgeler – mixing assistant (tracks 1, 2, 8, 11)
- Ash Howes – mixing (tracks 4, 5, 9)
- David Norland – producer (track 10); additional producer (track 4); executive producer
- Chris Paroz – mixing (track 12)
- Stuart Price – producer (tracks 2–9, 11, 13); mixing (tracks 3, 11, 13)
- Red Design – art direction, design, illustration
- Alberto Seveso – illustration
- Fraser T Smith – additional producer (track 4)
- Brio Taliaferro – additional programming (tracks 1, 2, 8)
- Mark Taylor – additional producer, mixing (tracks 6, 7)
- Adam Wakeman – additional piano (track 4)
- Jeremy Wheatley – additional producer, mixing (tracks 1, 2, 8)

== Charts ==
| Chart (2009) | Peak position |
|---|---|
| Irish Albums Chart | 88 |
| UK Albums Chart | 13 |

== Release history ==
| Country | Date | Label | Edition |
|---|---|---|---|
| Ireland | 31 July 2009 | Island Records | Standard, deluxe |
| United Kingdom | 3 August 2009 | Island Records | Standard, deluxe |
| Germany | 18 August 2009 | Universal Music | Standard |
| United Kingdom | 6 December 2009 | Island Records | Completely Me |

== Completed new album version ==
Completed

Studio album by Frankmusik
- Released: 31 December 2022
- Genre: Electropop; synth-pop; dance-pop
- Length: 58:00
- Label: All in
- Producer: Frankmusik

Frankmusik chronology
| Carissimi (2021) | Completed (2022) |

=== Background ===
A new version of the album reworked from scratch, titled Completed, was released in December 2022 under Turner's own label. With a song release each last day of the month from January till December. The track listing is slightly different from the Original Complete Me album, it includes a reworked version of Made Her Smile from Turner's 2007 EP Frankisum. An instrumental version of each track is included on the digital version. In April 2023 Turner managed to release a self funded blue vinyl version of the album. The vinyl had 100 signed copies that sold out quickly.

Completed track listing
| No. | Title | Month Release | Length |
|---|---|---|---|
| 1. | "In Step" | January | 4:07 |
| 2. | "Better Off as 2" | February | 3:51 |
| 3. | "Gotta Boyfriend?" | March | 3:27 |
| 4. | "Confusion Girl" | April | 3:14 |
| 5. | "Your Boy" | May | 3:15 |
| 6. | "When You're Around" | June | 2:59 |
| 7. | "3 Little Words" | July | 3:56 |
| 8. | "Wonder Woman" | August | 3:00 |
| 9. | "Complete Me" | September | 3:32 |
| 10. | "Vacant Heart" | September | 3:58 |
| 11. | "Time Will Tell" | October | 3:24 |
| 12. | "Done Done" | November | 6:22 |
| 13. | "Run Away From Trouble" | December | 4:28 |
| 14. | "Made Her Smile" | December | 4:25 |

Notes

- "When You're Around" is an adaptation of "Golden Brown" by The Stranglers. Both songs were reworked from scratch during the process of the album. The original Stanglers'song was released at the end of June performed by Turner on his Spotify and YouTube channel. It was one of the first bonus track.
- A new version of the hidden track "Olivia" was supposed to be produced but matter of time Turner did not make it.
