= Get to Heaven =

Studio album by Everything Everything
- Released: 22 June 2015
- Recorded: 2014
- Studios: Angelic Studios (Northampton, England); Crotch Int. (Gilsland, England); Making Do (Manchester, England); Eve Studios (Bredbury, England); Distillery (Wiltshire, England)
- Genres: Art pop; art rock; progressive pop
- Length: 46:05
- Label: RCA Victor
- Producers: Stuart Price; Everything Everything

Everything Everything chronology
| Arc (2013) | Get to Heaven (2015) | A Fever Dream (2017) |

Singles from Get to Heaven
- 1. "Distant Past" Released: 17 February 2015; 2. "Regret" Released: 29 April 2015; 3. "Spring / Sun / Winter / Dread" Released: 4 September 2015; 4. "No Reptiles" Released: 20 November 2015

Get to Heaven is the third studio album by British band Everything Everything. It was released on 22 June 2015, by RCA Records. It was produced primarily in Angelic Studios in Northampton during the latter half of 2014 with producer Stuart Price. A deluxe edition, featuring an additional six tracks, was released simultaneously. It peaked at number seven on the United Kingdom Albums Chart, and also charted in Australia and Ireland. The tracks "Distant Past", "Regret", "Spring / Sun / Winter / Dread", and "No Reptiles" were released as singles throughout 2015.

The album's lyrical themes are dark, focusing on global tensions and political happenings during 2014. The rise of the Islamic State of Iraq and the Levant, media coverage of the 2015 general election in the United Kingdom, and various mass shootings influenced its writing. The upbeat sound of the music was composed to provide contradiction to the violent subject matter, and is inspired by artists such as Radiohead, Suicide, and Kendrick Lamar. As with previous Everything Everything work, most of the songs are presented as in-character narrations.

Get to Heaven was well received by critics, with most reviewers noting the effectiveness of the album's message; others commented on its bold, aggressive nature, with some labelling the tone "overwhelming". It was at one point touted as a favourite to win the 2015 Mercury Prize, but ultimately was not shortlisted for the award.

== Recording and production ==
Initial work on Get to Heaven was done during a busy touring schedule for the group's second album Arc (2013). Following this tour, they rented studio space in Wales in an effort to be "away and isolated", but nothing came of these sessions. The album itself was recorded at Angelic Studios in Northampton during 2014. The liner notes suggest several other spaces were also used for parts of the album, including Crotch Int. in Gilsland, Eve Studios in Bredbury, Making Do in Manchester, and Distillery in Wiltshire. They hinted at the album's production through their Twitter account in August 2014, and announced they were in the process of recording two weeks later.

Everything Everything went into the studio aiming to "make people want to move", and set about avoiding slower-paced songs that had featured strongly on their previous album. This became apparent to them following the writing of eventual album closer "Warm Healer". Lead vocalist, Jonathan Higgs, told Anthem Magazine that "we kind of ripped up that rule book after reali[s]ing, 'Right. Let’s not write something this quiet. Let’s do horrible stuff from now on'". The group worked on ideas for songs as they came to them, rather than their previous method of practising and recording as a live group. Bass guitarist, Jeremy Pritchard, explained to Skiddle that the group were keen to create a record that would "stand up for the huge amount of time you spend touring a record", which in turn inspired a more pop-oriented sound than had appeared on Arc. Higgs later discussed how they used their previous sound to inform the direction of Get to Heaven, seeking to avoid "quiet songs" and "tenderness" in an effort to "inject a new fire into ourselves".

Though previous albums were produced by David Kosten, they enlisted the support of producer Stuart Price after he impressed them with his work on a demo version of the eventual single, "Regret". As Price was based in Los Angeles, the band emailed him samples of their work for him to critique and receive his suggested mixes in return. They had mixed reactions to his suggestions; at one point during production of "Hapsburg Lippp" – a track which did not make the final track listing – Price returned them a reggae-inspired mix as a joke. Higgs explained to Andy Morris of Gigwise that Price had an "ability to become one of us very quickly". Price joined them in person for the last nine days of recording. Guitarist Alex Robertshaw said to Digital Spy that his positivity made an impression on them: "Just [having] another seriously creative person in the room with you is fantastic."

During recording sessions, Higgs suffered from depression. He referred to the end of their 150-date tour as "an out-of-the-sauna-and-into-a-cold-bath experience", adding that "riding that low as well as trying to make a record was quite hard". He was affected by frequent mood swings as a result of his medication; Pritchard said that these "affected [them] pretty adversely". Drummer, Michael Spearman, explained to Q that Higgs's attempt to channel his depression into his writing worried the rest of the group. At one point during writing sessions, Higgs presented his bandmates with "Pigdog", a song about "how [he is] a horrible person and [he doesn't] want to be one any more". Spearman objected to this style: "For me that was a turning point. I was like, 'Let's make a record that’s energetic and fucked up and exciting.'"

== Composition ==
=== Music ===
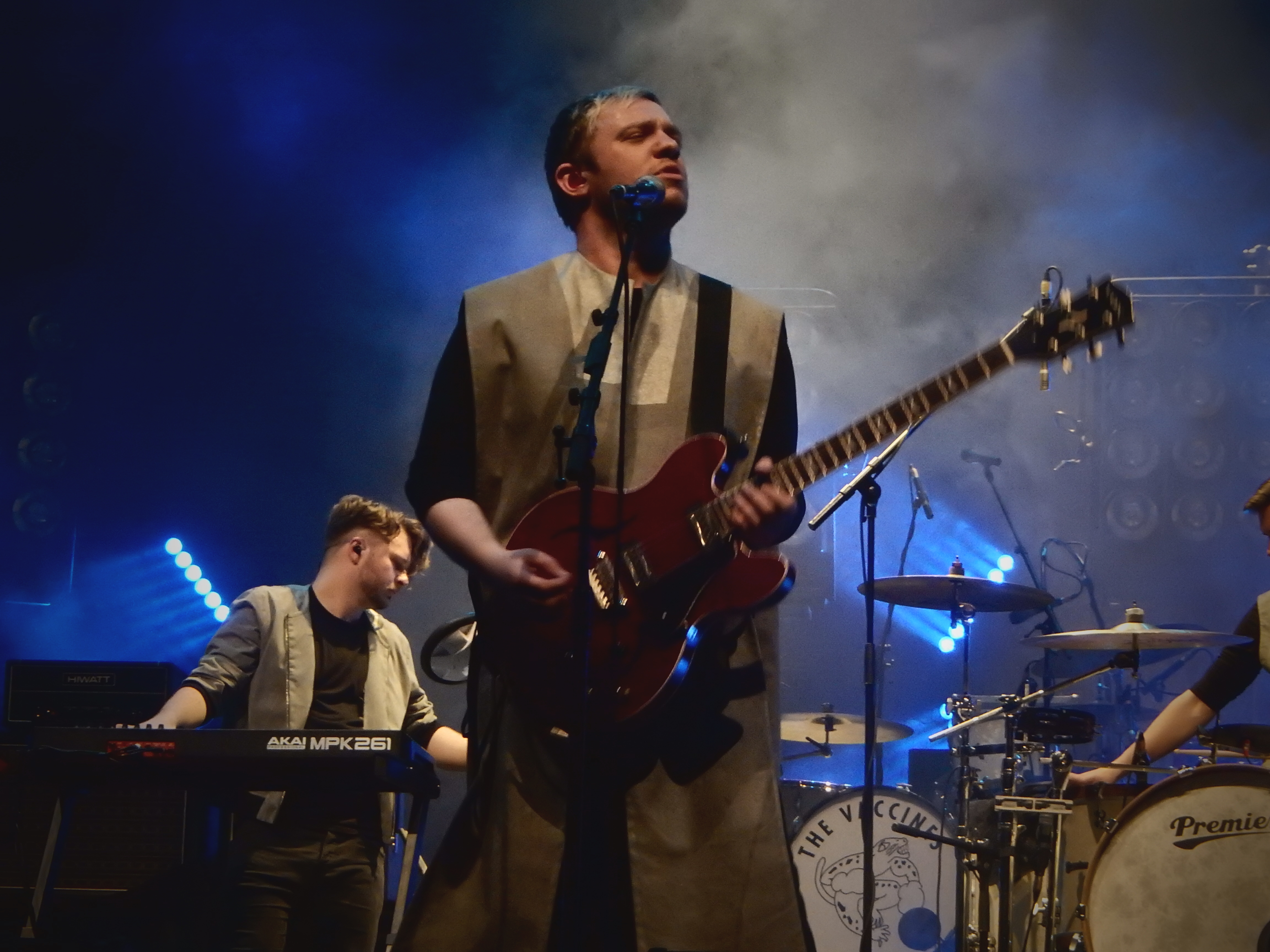
Higgs mid-performance at the Royal Albert Hall in London

Robertshaw told Drowned in Sound's Robert Leedham that the album is "bolder" than the group's previous work, and is "the most Everything Everything record we've ever done". The band aimed for a "euphoric" sound to provide a "contradiction between the way the lyrics are and [their] sound". In March 2015, they described their sound as "Baroque Obama" on Facebook, explaining to Gigwise that "it's where Bach meets Jay Z". For certain tracks, Robertshaw said their aim was "to sound like changing radio stations", toying with various musical ideas in one song in the same style as Kendrick Lamar. Spearman compared this style to the humour in The Simpsons: "It's twenty minutes of 'bang, bang, bang' – where it started up was way different to where it ends up. The stories are just fucking crazy. That's fun to us."

Higgs named Suicide's 1977 single "Frankie Teardrop" as a major influence on the album's sound, describing it as "genuinely scary music": "It's a song: I shouldn't be feeling like this." They tried to replicate this unsettling, unpredictable sound on the album, but "wanted a happy ending". In an interview with The Independent, Higgs spoke of Radiohead's critically acclaimed Kid A (2000) as a further influence, as they "threw out guitars, and with it the very idea of genre". Radiohead's influence on the record was commented on further by Laura Snapes at Pitchfork, who noted the use of a "paranoid guitar solo borrowed from Hail to the Thief". Critics would later refer to their sound generally as "maximalist art pop" or art rock. In other sections of the album, they experimented with other genres; Ludovic Hunter-Tilney of the Financial Times noted the "Talking Heads-style Afro-pop" of title track "Get to Heaven".

Most of the melodies on Get to Heaven originated from Robertshaw's guitar, though he recalled to Rich Chamberlain of MusicRadar that Higgs would occasionally approach the rest of the group with "an insane laptop creation" which would have to be translated to work as a group. Several tracks feature complex guitar solos, as noted by Chamberlain; one such solo, featured on the title track "Get to Heaven", was originally recorded in a hotel room. Another, on the single "Spring / Sun / Winter / Dread", makes heavy use of an MWFX Judder pedal. Robertshaw told Chamberlain that "[it] is a bit of a signature for the new record... You can do totally unrealistic things with it and it makes you sound like Steve Vai on crack."

=== Lyrics ===
"The Wheel (Is Turning Now)"
The pre-chorus of "The Wheel (Is Turning Now)" discusses, through metaphor, the impact of populism in the United Kingdom, themes which are present throughout the lyrics of Get to Heaven.

I felt very, very upset with the way people treated each other last year, when we were writing, and a lot of that came out as anger. It made me feel a lot better to sing about it, and a lot of what was said really needed to be said by someone, even if I didn't. Even if my main message that people get is 'I don't know what's going on but I think you're all dicks... does anyone else feel like this?', that's important as no one was saying even that. Everyone was just letting it all go on, only saying 'ooh, isn't it terrible?', but not engaging or trying to understand why these things were happening, or not even having an opinion about our role in all of it. I just felt like I needed to say something, even if that is on a poppy-indie type record. Perhaps that's not the best way to do it, but I have that platform, so it's the one I used.

— Jonathan Higgs on the album's lyrics, in an interview with The Line of Best Fit

The album's themes revolve around events which took place in 2015, such as the rise of the Islamic State of Iraq and the Levant (ISIL) and the British media's handling of the United Kingdom general election, as well as on the state of humanity. Lead writer Higgs spent a year writing the album, time he spent watching rolling news and enveloping himself in current events. Pritchard told the London Evening Standard that "we're in an age where we're more conscious of [upheaval and violence ...] you're constantly bombarded by information". Speaking to Chris Parkin of Red Bull, Higgs explained the songwriting process provided a kind of catharsis following the year's events: "It wasn't until after we finished that I looked back and thought, bloody hell, I was feeling that very heavily and I didn't realise until it was out of me." He later described the album as a "horror bible", and stated one of the unifying concepts was to litter the album "with predictions and clues that I was going to become a terrorist...become the other".

The album's opening track, "To the Blade", has often been cited as focusing on the death of Manchester-born aid worker Alan Henning at the hands of ISIL's "Jihadi John"; Higgs explained to Drowned in Sound that: "He was a taxi driver from Stockport, I could have met him. And the fact that someone who did it was also from Britain, but this was being played out on a global scale... It seemed like the craziest thing I’d ever heard." However, Higgs later went on to say that Henning acted as more of a general inspiration for the album, and the song in particular was written as "...a letter to someone who is close [to] a person who's done something terrible...It's something people won't consider for a second - that they could be one of these monsters if they were in different circumstances." Other songs criticise political leaders in the United Kingdom. Higgs had been vocal of his distaste of politics in interviews following the release of Arc. Several critics suggest that "The Wheel (Is Turning Now)" is a commentary on the "snake-oil appeal" of then-UK Independence Party leader Nigel Farage; Higgs told The Line of Best Fit that the song also comments on "religious leaders and charismatic, corrupt leaders, or even men as gods". "No Reptiles" supposes that political leaders are "just fat, bald, old men, like soft-boiled eggs, that are just weak-willed, with no strong feelings (good or ill)"; its lyrics also make cryptic reference to Elliot Rodger, who carried out the 2014 Isla Vista killings.

Much of the album is presented in-character through the eyes of various fictional characters and onlookers. "Fortune 500" documents a fictional attempt to assassinate Queen Elizabeth II, which Higgs relates to the thoughts of suicide bombers moments before they detonate: "The horror of the doubt is far worse than the act, for the terrorist I mean. It’s this 'oh shit... maybe this isn’t what God wants'. I think it's the darkest moment on the record." Spearman called the inclusion of loaded, political lyrics on otherwise upbeat songs "the Trojan Horse approach ... get your interesting lyrical idea into something that on the face of it is just there to be enjoyed". Higgs told NME that Kanye West's 2013 album Yeezus had a major impact on his writing, encouraging him to present himself more confidently, while Nick Cave provided inspiration to be more impulsive with his writing.

== Promotion and release ==
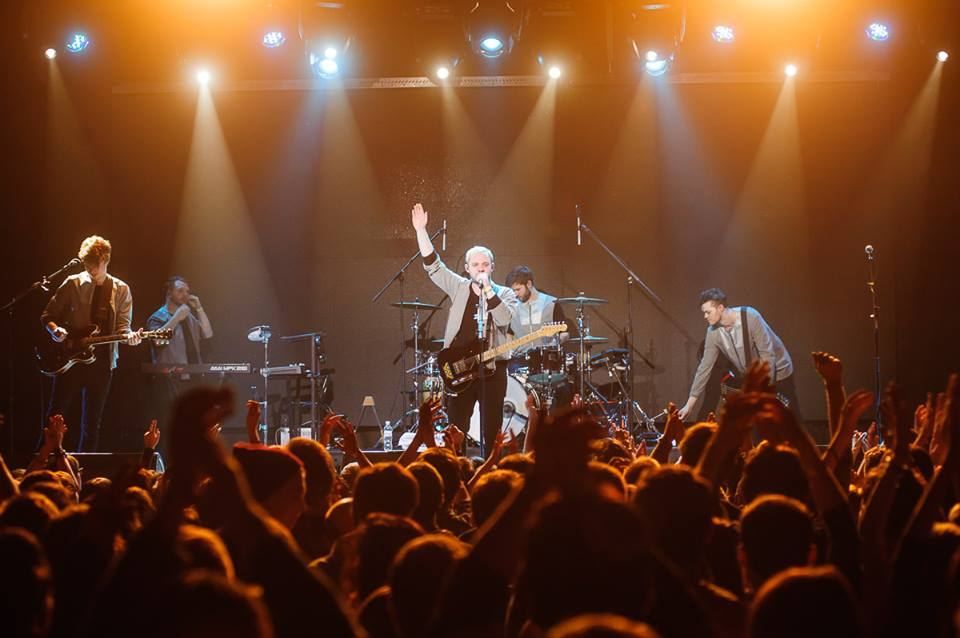
Everything Everything playing in support of the album in Kyiv, Ukraine, in December 2015

In November 2014, near the end of the album's production, Everything Everything performed an artist residency at the Manchester Central Library. The band began marketing the album through a teaser campaign on their social media feeds, featuring lyrics from the album. They announced Get to Heaven's title and initial release date on 14 February 2015. The album's first single, "Distant Past", was debuted on 17 February 2015 on Zane Lowe's BBC Radio 1 show, with the official music video released later that day through YouTube. They debuted several new songs from the album at a show at the Oval Space in London on 9 April 2015. The second single from the album, "Regret", was premiered by DJ Annie Mac on 29 April 2015.

The album art, designed by New Zealand surrealist illustrator Andrew Archer, was not revealed until May. In an interview with Brighton's Finest, Higgs explained the image represents a faith healer "being faith-healed, his face a kind of agony/ecstasy expression", with the bold colour palette representing the album's themes of extremism and information overload. Liner notes, which included large-type excerpts of the album's lyrics on bright gradients, were designed by Johnny Costello of Adult Art Club "to echo high impact religious posters". The album's artwork was included in Creative Review's list of the top ten album covers of 2015.

The album was released on 22 June 2015 in the United Kingdom and worldwide on RCA Records. Its title was almost "Gimme the Gun", though the band decided not to "put a cherry" on the aggressive lyrical content. Instead, "Get to Heaven" was chosen to represent hope and positivity. The album was released in the United States on 26 February 2016 through independent record label Big Picnic/RED.

=== Touring ===
Everything Everything announced a string of United Kingdom touring dates to promote Get to Heaven, scheduled for 7–21 November 2015, culminating with a show at the O2 Apollo Manchester. They appeared at various European festivals during 2015 including Glastonbury and T in the Park. The American release was promoted with the group's first tour of the United States, playing fifteen dates in support of Welsh indie rock band The Joy Formidable.

== Critical reception ==
Professional ratings
Aggregate scores
| Source | Rating |
|---|---|
| Metacritic | 80/100 |
Review scores
| Source | Rating |
| AllMusic | 4/5 stars |
| Clash | 9/10 |
| Digital Spy | 5/5 stars |
| Drowned in Sound | 8/10 |
| NME | 7/10 |
| Pitchfork | 7.2/10 |
| Telegraph | 5/5 stars |
| Q | 5/5 stars |

Aggregating website Metacritic reported a normalised rating of 80 out of 100 based on 16 reviews, indicating "generally favourable" reception. Q wrote that the album was "spectacular" in a five-star review, and later named the album as the 20th-best of the year. The Telegraph's Helen Brown commented that "the lads have given this album everything, everything and then some", while Andrew Backhouse of DIY called it "a masterpiece": "this is in a new gear to what their younger selves – or any other band today – could ever dream of." Much was said about the album's reliance on dark themes. Laura Snapes of Pitchfork wrote that these can be "overwhelming", though she credited them for "attempting to offer a nuanced understanding of a broken world at a time when a lot of their significantly less imaginative British indie rock peers say worse than nothing".

Critics also commented on the contrast between lyrical themes and underlying music. Digital Spy's Harry Fletcher wrote that there is "something eminently Mancunian" about the clash in styles. Uncut praised the band's "innovative songcraft", but added "their tendency to overthink and squeeze every drop of pleasure from their work does them few favours", while Mojo suggested that they were "self-consciously dialing everything up to 11 before things go up in flames". The Guardian's Alexis Petridis compared the album's sound to its themes in a three-star review, suggesting that the album "[evokes] the information overload of 24-hour rolling news so well that it essentially provokes the same reaction: it's often compelling, but you occasionally find yourself gripped by an overwhelming urge to turn it off". The album was among the favourites for the Mercury Prize, with British bookmakers Ladbrokes at one time offering odds of 4/1, but was not among the twelve albums selected for the shortlist. BBC News Online included the album on their list of "ten albums they missed".

== Commercial performance ==
Get to Heaven entered the United Kingdom Albums Chart at number seven, and the ARIA Charts (Australia) at number twenty-nine. Singles "Distant Past" and "Regret" peaked in the United Kingdom at numbers 88 and 119, respectively, while "Spring / Sun / Winter / Dread" failed to chart.

== Track listing ==
All lyrics are written by Jonathan Higgs; all music is composed by Higgs, Jeremy Pritchard, Alex Robertshaw, Michael Spearman.

Standard edition
| No. | Title | Length |
|---|---|---|
| 1. | "To the Blade" | 4:15 |
| 2. | "Distant Past" | 3:42 |
| 3. | "Get to Heaven" | 3:43 |
| 4. | "Regret" | 3:22 |
| 5. | "Spring / Sun / Winter / Dread" | 3:18 |
| 6. | "The Wheel (Is Turning Now)" | 5:26 |
| 7. | "Fortune 500" | 4:16 |
| 8. | "Blast Doors" | 3:30 |
| 9. | "Zero Pharaoh" | 3:39 |
| 10. | "No Reptiles" | 4:42 |
| 11. | "Warm Healer" | 6:12 |
| Total length: | | 46:05 |

Deluxe edition
| No. | Title | Length |
|---|---|---|
| 12. | "We Sleep in Pairs" | 3:23 |
| 13. | "Hapsburg Lippp" | 3:39 |
| 14. | "President Heartbeat" | 3:21 |
| 15. | "Brainchild" | 3:51 |
| 16. | "Yuppie Supper" | 3:33 |
| 17. | "Only as Good as My God" | 3:35 |
| Total length: | | 67:27 |

Expanded 10th Anniversary edition
| No. | Title | Length |
|---|---|---|
| 18. | "Pressure" | 3:43 |
| 19. | "Magnetophone" | 3:30 |
| 20. | "Live Intro" | 2:56 |
| 21. | "To the Blade (To the Bone)" | 4:17 |
| 22. | "Indigo - Demo" | 3:52 |
| 23. | "Give Me Your Blood - Demo" | 3:32 |

- In some regions, "Fortune 500" and "We Sleep in Pairs" were previously incorrectly titled "Future 500" and "We Sleep in Paris" on Spotify and other streaming platforms.

Vinyl

- A gatefold vinyl edition of the album was distributed in the UK by RCA Records, featuring the same track listing as the standard edition of the album.

== Personnel ==
Adapted from the Get to Heaven liner notes.

Everything Everything

- Jonathan Higgs – vocals, guitar, keyboards, programming
- Jeremy Pritchard – bass guitar, backing vocals, keyboards
- Alex Robertshaw – guitar, backing vocals, programming, keyboards
- Michael Spearman – drums, percussion, keyboards, backing vocals

Artwork

- Andrew Archer – album cover illustration
- Johnny Costello – layout, typography

Production

- Stuart Price – production, programming, mixing (tracks 5, 7, 9, 10, 11)
- Tom A.D. Fuller – engineering, additional production
- Everything Everything – recording, production, engineering (tracks 2, 4)
- Tim Young – mastering
- Martin King – engineering (tracks 3, 4)
- Harry Broadhead – engineering (tracks 3, 4, 8)
- Matt Tait – engineering (track 7)
- Phil Parsons – engineering (track 7)
- Jim Abiss – additional production (track 8)
- Ian Dowling – additional engineering (track 8)
- Luke Gibbs – recording assistant
- Cenzo Townshend – mixing (tracks 1–4, 6, 8)

== Charts ==
=== Album ===
Weekly charts
| Chart (2015) | Peak position |
|---|---|
| Australian Albums (ARIA) | 29 |
| Irish Albums (IRMA) | 45 |
| Scottish Albums (Official Charts) | 17 |
| UK Albums (Official Charts) | 7 |

Weekly charts
| Chart (2025) | Peak position |
|---|---|
| Scottish Albums (Official Charts) | 14 |
| UK Independent Albums (Official Charts) | 5 |

=== Singles ===
| Song | Peak |
| Song | UK |
|---|---|
| "Distant Past" | 88 |
| "Regret" | 119 |
| "Spring / Sun / Winter / Dread" | — |
| "No Reptiles" | — |

"—" denotes releases that did not chart.
