= Frankmusik =

English synth-pop musician (born 1985)

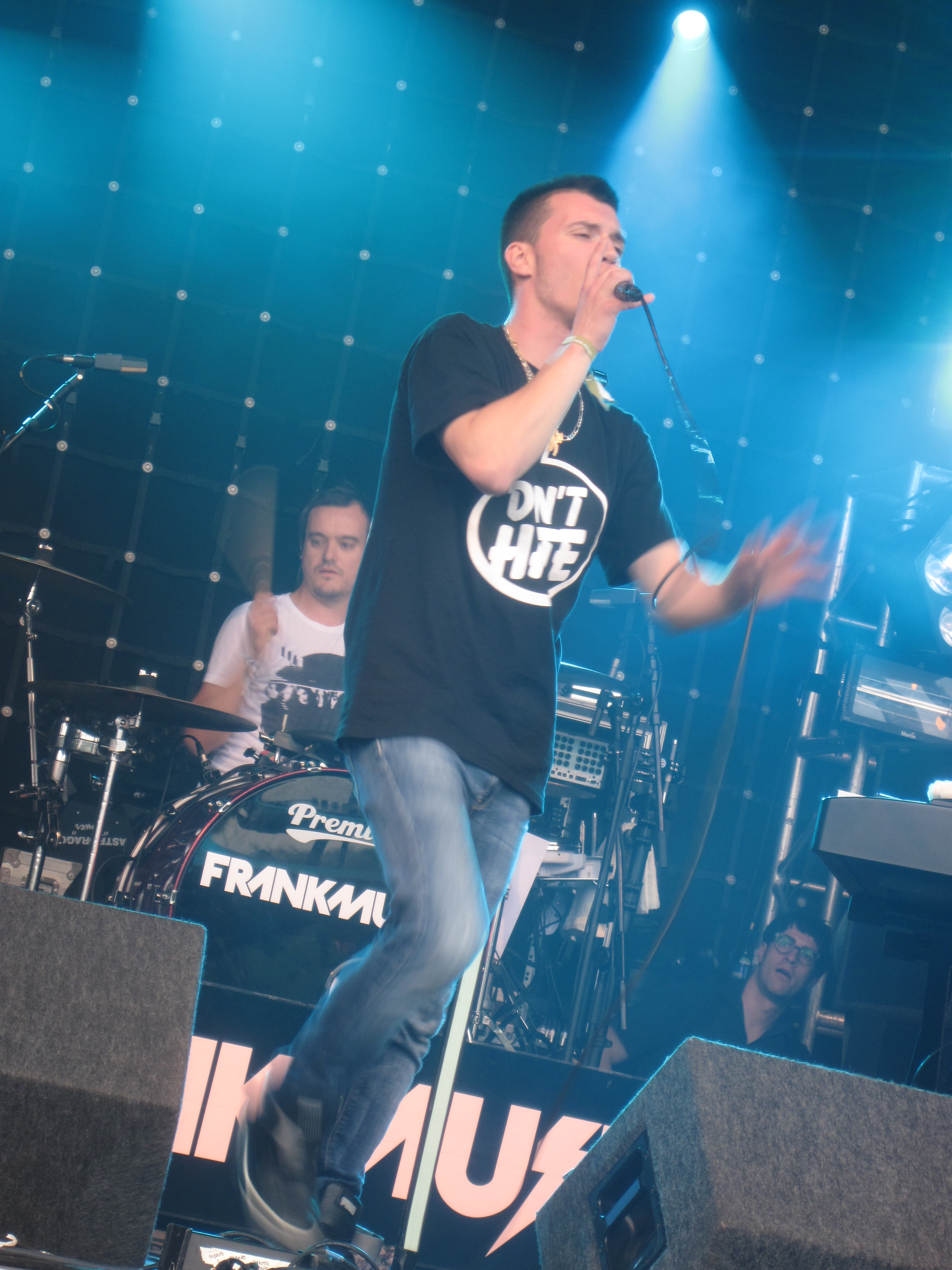
- Frankmusik performing at Lovebox Festival in London on 18 July 2009

Background information
- Also known as: Vincent Did It; Vincent Frank; Stephanie Clothing; Mr. Mouth (beat-boxing)
- Born: Vincent James Turner; 9 October 1985 (age 40); Thornton Heath, London, England
- Genres: Synth-pop; dance-pop
- Occupations: Singer; songwriter; record producer; musician; remixer
- Instruments: Vocals; synthesizer; keyboards; beatbox
- Years active: 2006–present
- Labels: All in; Let's Make Records; Apparent; Island; Cherrytree; Interscope; VDI USA Inc.
- Website: www.frankmusik.com

Vincent James Turner (born 9 October 1985), better known by his stage name Frankmusik (/fræŋkˈmjuːzɪk/ frank-MYOO-zik) (and between 2011 and 2012, by the name Vincent Did It), is an English synth-pop musician. Since 2010 he is based in Los Angeles as remixer and producer.

== Early life ==
Vincent James Turner was born on 9 October 1985 in the Thornton Heath district of the London Borough of Croydon. He attended Christ's Hospital boarding school in West Sussex and was a member of the house 'Maine A'. He entertained his housemates with constant piano playing. He completed a year-long foundation course at Central Saint Martins College of Art and Design and went on to study at the London College of Fashion, dropping out to concentrate on music.

== Career ==
=== 2007–2009: Frankisum EP and Complete Me ===
During 2004, Turner performed as a beatboxer, under the name Mr Mouth.

Turner released his debut EP, Frankisum, in 2007. Former school friend and then assistant of A&R at Island Records, Ben Scarr, introduced Island colleague Louis Bloom to Frankmusik's MySpace page, which was getting a significant number of hits at the time. Although already known for high energy electro and happy hardcore, Frankmusik's signing to Island was in part because Bloom recognised a pop star performer beneath the electronic music, telling HitQuarters: "Underneath all the madness there was some great hooks and melodies, and buried even deeper was a voice; it took a lot of time after signing for him to have the confidence to sing without putting loads of effects over his vocal."

In June 2008, Frankmusik remixed the second single by The Clik Clik "Did You Wrong", which appeared on the B-side of the 7" single release.

In December 2008, Frankmusik made it on to the long-list of the BBC's Sound of 2009 poll. In the UK, Gaydar Radio was the first national station to champion Frankmusik and tracks from his debut album, Complete Me. Initially interviewed by Alex Baker as part of the station's coverage of National Student Pride, Frankmusik performed a number of live tracks, which were then playlisted as part of an album teaser. His rise to fame was also followed closely by his local radio station, 107.8 Radio Jackie, which was the first station to broadcast his music.

In January and February 2009, he was the support act for Keane on their Perfect Symmetry tour in the UK. In March 2009, he headlined National Student Pride in Brighton's seafront club Digital with Jodie Harsh and Dan Gillespie Sells (The Feeling). In June 2009, Frankmusik was the support act for the Pet Shop Boys in London, Manchester and Liverpool. He did a short tour to launch the album Complete Me, starting in Brighton on 17 July and taking in London, Glasgow, and Manchester.

Complete Me debuted on the UK Albums Chart at No. 13 in August 2009, after its second single, "Confusion Girl", was A-listed by BBC Radio 1 and reached No. 27 on the UK Singles Chart. The other singles were "Better Off as Two", which peaked at No. 26, and "3 Little Words".

In August 2009, a more extensive UK tour was announced to take place during November and December that year. Just two days later on 20 August 2009, it was announced that Frankmusik would join the Perez Hilton Presents tour in Autumn 2009. Frankmusik was part of a line-up at The O2 Arena 3D ELEKTRO RAVE alongside Caspa and Rusko, Tinchy Stryder, High Contrast, and Dancing Robot Music.

During recording and promotion of his debut album, Frankmusik remixed material by other artists, including the Pet Shop Boys' "Love etc.", Lady Gaga's "Eh Eh (Nothing Else I Can Say)", Alphabeat's "Fascination" and "10,000 Nights", Mika's "Relax, Take It Easy" and CSS's "Move", and has covered "Rehab" by Amy Winehouse and The Postal Service's "Such Great Heights". Frankmusik also co-produced "First Place" on Tinchy Stryder's 2009 album, Catch 22, and "Wish I Stayed" on Ellie Goulding's Lights (2010).

=== 2010–2011: Move to Los Angeles and Do It in the AM ===
In early 2010, Turner decided to move from London to Los Angeles as his own producer. He had more time, more space and it was cheaper than doing it in London.

He featured on a Far East Movement track called "Fighting for Air", from their album Free Wired; he also appeared in Far East Movement's music video for "Rocketeer" with Colette Carr and Mohombi. The same year he collaborated with Computer Club on a track called "Losing Streak".

It was announced in February 2011 that he had begun work producing the new Erasure album in Maine. Entitled Tomorrow's World, this was released on 3 October 2011 in the UK, and 4 October 2011 in the US. During October and November 2011, Frankmusik was the supporting act on the Erasure tour across the US and Europe.

In an April 2011 interview, his A&R Louis Bloom said that Frankmusik was at work on his upcoming album. According to Bloom: "The challenge has been for him to simplify the structure of his songwriting whilst still encouraging him into taking risks on the production duties." The album, Do It in the AM, was released in September 2011 and peaked at No. 178 on the UK Albums Chart.

On 19 October 2011, Frankmusik announced via his official Twitter page that he had parted ways with his UK label, Island Records.

=== 2012–2013: The SOPA Opera, Far From Over, Between and Between Us ===
In an interview with music blog Flop of the Pops on 3 January 2012, Frankmusik announced that he would change his stage name to Vincent Did It, along with the exclusive premiere of a song titled "Dynamo", part of the SOPA Opera EP.

On 10 March 2012, Turner announced on his Twitter page that he had decided once again to go by his former stage name, Frankmusik. He then released two new acoustic demos titled "I'll Know" and "This Is Who I Am" on his official SoundCloud account for Frankmusik. Throughout 2012 Turner released thirteen demos online.

On 31 October 2012, Turner released a single titled "Fast as I Can". The song was released independently through the digital distribution company Tunecore for international release. The song was originally meant to be the lead single off of his then-titled album, You Are Here. Turner announced a track listing for the album and set a release date for 2013. The album was soon later scrapped, Turner claiming that he wanted to start fresh and not with "songs [he] wrote six months ago". On 14 February, Turner released his sixth EP, titled, Far From Over. The EP consisted of four songs and was released for free through his website. The EP was not available for purchase, instead it was free but fans were asked to donate to JustGiving what they thought the EP was worth.

Shortly after the EP's release, Turner announced that his third studio album, Between, would be released on 1 April 2013. In March 2013, Turner announced that the album would no longer be released in April, along with revealing the cover art. The album's lead single "Chasing Shadows" was released on 9 May 2013 along with its video. On 11 May 2013, Turner announced that Between would be released on 7 June 2013.

On 10 September 2013, Turner released a full acoustic album called Between Us featuring 10 songs from Between as well as a new song called "Hymn" to coincide with Between.

=== 2013–2015: By Nicole and For You ===
On 13 December 2013, Turner released a single, "Ephemeral Summer", on iTunes and its video two days later. In January 2014, Turner announced he was working on his new album, titled By Nicole, and announced its lead single, "Dear Nicole". The song was released through Turner's YouTube account on 14 February 2014.

In February 2014, to coincide with the launch of season six of RuPaul's Drag Race, RuPaul released his sixth studio album, Born Naked, including the track "Fly Tonight" featuring Frankmusik.

On 1 April 2014, the album's third overall single, "These Streets", was released accompanying its music video through Turner's YouTube account and was made available the following day on the iTunes store. Turner announced through his YouTube, Facebook and Twitter pages on 18 April that the album would be released on 28 April 2014.

The singer's fifth album was confirmed on 9 March 2015 via Twitter, Not Right Now. The first single, "This", was released on 4 May 2015.

On 13 August 2015, Turner announced a new album title "For You", along with the track listing and a release date for October 2015.

Frankmusik provided guest vocals for RuPaul's 2015 album Realness on the song "Die Tomorrow". This makes the second consecutive appearance of Frankmusik on a RuPaul album.

=== 2016: Day Break, Night Shift and the Anya Hindmarch Fashion Shows ===
On 21 July 2016, Day Break was released as an eight track EP (Digital + Physical). A limited run of 500 copies were made and the first 100 were numbered and signed by Frankmusik.

Night Shift EP followed in July 2017 including seven remixes and the instrumental songs of Day Break.

During this year, Turner started to write short synth instrumental pieces for Anya Hindmarch Fashion Shows in London. Referred to the names of the collection seasons SS16, AW16, SS17, AW17, SS18..., his collaboration with her is still going on.

=== 2017: SS17, AW17 and instrumentals ===
SS17 is a six track EP that was released digitally on 17 June 2017.

AW17 is an eight track EP and followed later in the autumn of 2017. Instrumentals were released together for both in 2018 as an EP.

=== 2020: Stephanie Clothing ===
In May 2020, Turner produced an instrumental dance/funk album under the new name of Stephanie Clothing. The album contains nine tracks, each one illustrated by one colourful theme. The album is called 2020 Vision and was available in physical and digital copies.

=== 2021–present: Reworks and Nobody ===
Starting January 2021, Turner was involved in a project releasing a new digital single on the last day of every month. A new album consisting of all the singles would be released at the end of the year. On 8 November, Turner surprised his fans by releasing the physical studio album titled Carissimi, two months before the end of the monthly releases. On 31 December, Turner released another single "Next" and the album instrumentals.

Also in 2021, Turner collaborated with Kaushik Velendra for the SS22 and AW22 LFW Fashion Collections by writing short instrumental pieces.

Turner made reworks from scratch of his first album Complete Me that were not under his own label, releasing them on the last day of each month. The first track in the album release was "In Step". It includes two new remastered songs. The album was released at the end of the year with physical and digital releases. The album is called Completed. In parallel, two of his previous works were published at the end of 2022. An EP included the songs of the Anya Hindmarch Fashion Shows through the years 2016, 2017 and 2018. In addition, some old demos he made for the background music for a now defunct website called The Heaths of Thornton. He said "The EP was comprised of a random selection of tracks made after I just left high school and after dropping out of college (LCF). Some tracks were very rough. While others were modified professional demos to fit the vibe of the piece of music. For this release I decided to go in and create the correct splice points for each track in the mix and make it a more consumable piece of work instead of releasing it as a non stop 45 track. Although the last track is in fact the continuous work unedited."

For London Fashion Week in February 2023, Turner returned to instrumental music production for fashion designer Kaushik Velendra's Collections AW23.

In July 2023, Turner ended the project with the final song "Crazy Love" to focus on family and personal projects. The 12 song album named Nobody was printed as an orange CD in November 2023. Only 100 copies were available. However the song "I'm Frozen" (featuring Goodbye The Hundred and Berenice Scott) was not included in the physical release.

== Influences ==
Frankmusik cites Daft Punk, Erasure, Electric Light Orchestra, Razorlight, Hard-fi, Pet Shop Boys, Late Of The Pier, Oasis and Killa Kela as influences.

== In popular culture ==
- Frankmusik appeared naked in the British gay lifestyle magazine AXM in 2009.
- A lyrical reference is made to Frankmusik in the Colette Carr song "(We Do It) Primo". A drawing of Frankmusik and his logo are also displayed on a screen behind Carr when the reference is made. He also produced and co-wrote the track.

== Discography ==
=== Albums ===
Title	Album details	Peak chart positions	
Title	Album details	UK	IRE
Complete Me	Released: 31 July 2009; Label: Island	13	88
Do It in the AM	Released: 23 September 2011; Label: Island	—	—
Between	Released: 7 June 2013; Label: All in	—	—
By Nicole	Released: 28 April 2014; Label: All in	—	—
For You	Released: 9 October 2015; Label: All in	—	—
Carissimi	Released: 8 November 2021 (CD) / 1 January 2022 (Digital); Label: All in	—	—
Completed	Released: December 2022; Label: All in	—	—
Nobody	Released: 2023; Label: All in	—	—

=== EPs ===
- Frankisum (2007)
- Vincent Did It (The SOPA Opera) (2012)
- Far+from+Over (2013)
- The Moongazer EP (2014)
- Day Break (2016)
- Nightshift (remix album) (2017)
- SS17 (2017)
- AW17 (2017)
- The Anya Hindmarch Fashion Shows (November 2022)
- The Heath of Thornton (2003–2007 Demos) (November 2022)

=== Singles ===
Year	Title	Peak chart positions		Album
Year	Title	UK	IRE	Album
2008	"3 Little Words"	—	—	Complete Me
2008	"In Step / Done Done"	—	—	Complete Me
2009	"Better Off as Two"	26	—	Complete Me
2009	"Confusion Girl"	27	—	Complete Me
2009	"Time will tell"	173	—	Complete Me
2010	"The Fear Inside"	—	—	Do it in the AM
2011	"Do It in the AM" (featuring Far East Movement)	—	—	Do it in the AM
2011	"No I.D." (featuring Colette Carr)	—	—	Do it in the AM
2012	"Fast As I Can"	—	—	Between
2013	"Map"	—	—	Between
2013	"Chasing Shadows"	—	—	Between
2013	"Ephemeral Summer"	—	—	By Nicole
2014	"Dear Nicole"	—	—	By Nicole
2014	"These Streets"	—	—	By Nicole
2015	"This"	—	—	For You
2015	"I Remember"	—	—	For You
2015	"Awake"	—	—	For You
2016	"Turnin'"	—	—	For You
2016	"Day Break"	—	—	Day Break
2016	"Closer"	—	—	Day Break
2016	"High on You" (featuring Lindsay Lowend)	—	—	Day Break
2017	"Going Under"	—	—	SS17
2017	"WYG"	—	—	SS17
2021	"Waiting"	—	—	Song of Luobin Wang
2021	"In a Faraway Region"	—	—	Song of Luobin Wang
2021	"The Half Moon Came Up In The Sky"	—	—	Song of Luobin Wang
2024	"Grace"	—	—	TBA
2024	"Parking Lots"	—	—	TBA

=== Songs collaborations ===
Year	Title	Peak chart positions	Album
Year	Title	UK	Album
2009	"I Got Soul" (with The Young Soul Rebels)	10	Charity single
2017	"Wildfire" (with French Braids)	–	
2017	"So Damn Beautiful" (with FrankJavCee (Frankmusik version))	–	
2018	"Near or far" (with 813 & Crispy Flakes)	–	
2019	"Calling" (with Kalax)	–	
2020	"Desire" (with Louis Laroche)	–	Saturday Night Griever
2020	"Always" (with Louis Laroche)	–	Saturday Night Griever

== Songwriting and production credits ==
Title	Year	Artist(s)	Album	Credits	Written with	Produced with
"First Place"	2009	Tinchy Stryder	Catch 22	Co-writer; producer	Kwasi Danquah III	—
"Wish I Stayed"	2010	Ellie Goulding	Lights	Producer	—	—
"(We Do It) Primo"	2011	Colette Carr	Skitszo	Co-writer; producer	Colette Carr	—
"When I Start To (Break It All Down)"	2011	Erasure	Tomorrow's World	Producer	—	—
"Be with You"	2011	Erasure	Tomorrow's World	Producer	—	—
"Fill Us with Fire"	2011	Erasure	Tomorrow's World	Producer	—	—
"What Will I Say When You're Gone?"	2011	Erasure	Tomorrow's World	Producer	—	—
"You Got to Save Me Right Now"	2011	Erasure	Tomorrow's World	Producer	—	—
"A Whole Lotta Love Run Riot"	2011	Erasure	Tomorrow's World	Producer	—	—
"I Lose Myself"	2011	Erasure	Tomorrow's World	Producer	—	—
"Then I Go Twisting"	2011	Erasure	Tomorrow's World	Producer	—	—
"Just When I Thought It Was Ending"	2011	Erasure	Tomorrow's World	Producer	—	—
"Shot to the Heart"	2011	Erasure	Tomorrow's World	Producer	—	—
"F16"	2012	Colette Carr	Skitszo	Co-writer; producer	Colette Carr	—
"Drive & Smoke"	2012	SRH	City Switch EP	Producer	—	—
"Dufferluv"	2012	SRH	City Switch EP	Producer	—	—
"Got That" (featuring Mike Posner)	2012	SRH	City Switch EP	Producer	—	—
"Hometown Heroes"	2012	SRH	City Switch EP	Producer	—	—
"I Tried"	2012	SRH	City Switch EP	Producer	—	—
"Better Off"	2012	SRH	City Switch EP	Producer	—	—
"Hometown Heroes (Remix)" (featuring muGz, David Hodges and Stefanie Parnell)	2012	SRH	City Switch EP	Producer	—	—
"Complicated"	2013	Kentö	Non-album single	Co-writer; producer	Kentö	—
"Memory Foam"	2013	Ellie Rose	Memory Foam/Speed Bump	Co-writer; producer	Ellie Rose	—
"Mask"	2013	Ellie Rose	Memory Foam/Speed Bump	Co-writer; producer	Ellie Rose	—
"Killswitch"	2013	Colette Carr	Skitszo	Co-writer; producer	Colette Carr	—
"Hearsay"	2013	Colette Carr	Skitszo	Co-writer; producer	Colette Carr	—
"Delusional"	2013	Colette Carr	Skitszo	Co-writer; producer	Colette Carr	—
"Ready to Love"	2013	Katrina	Non-album single	Co-writer; producer	Katrina Abrahemian	—
"Midas Touch"	2014	Ashley Roberts	Butterfly Effect	Co-writer; producer	Ashley Roberts	—
"Wild Heart"	2014	Ashley Roberts	Butterfly Effect	Co-writer; producer	Ashley Roberts	—
"Standing in the Rain"	2014	Ashley Roberts	Butterfly Effect	Co-writer; producer	Ashley Roberts	—
"Double Trouble"	2014	Ray Noir	Non-album single	Writer; producer	—	—
"Die Tomorrow" (featuring Frankmusik)	2015	RuPaul	Realness	Co-writer; producer	RuPaul Charles	—
"I Ain't with You"	2015	Secaina Hudson	Non-album single	Co-writer; producer	Secaina Hudson	—
"Static"	2015	Colette Carr	Static.Start. EP	Co-writer; producer	Colette Carr; Cara Salimando	—
"Moments in Love"	2015	Colette Carr	Static.Start. EP	Co-writer; producer	Colette Carr; Cara Salimando	—
"Three Percent"	2015	Colette Carr	Static.Start. EP	Co-writer; producer	Colette Carr; Cara Salimando	—
"Walking in Place"	2015	Colette Carr	Static.Start. EP	Co-writer; producer	Colette Carr; Cara Salimando	—
"Tears Behind My Raybans"	2015	Ryan Swayze	Far from Normal Vol. 2	Producer	—	—
"Play House"	2016	Colette Carr	Believe in Us	Co-writer; producer	Colette Carr; Cara Salimando	—
"Honesty"	2017	John Galea	Missing Pages EP	Co-writer	John Galea	—
"Senses"	2017	Colette Carr	Believe in Us	Co-writer; producer	Colette Carr; Cara Salimando	—
"Believe in Us"	2017	Colette Carr	Believe in Us	Co-writer; producer	Colette Carr; Cara Salimando	—
"Satisfied"	2017	Colette Carr	Believe in Us	Co-writer; producer	Colette Carr; Cara Salimando	—
"Bury This Love"	2017	Colette Carr	Believe in Us	Co-writer; producer	Colette Carr; Erin Beck	—
"Fun"	2017	Colette Carr	Believe in Us	Co-writer; producer	Colette Carr	—
"看不見的城市 (Invisible Cities)"	2018	Tanya Chua	看不见的城市	Producer	蔡健雅	—
"40 Days"	2019	PJ Brennan	Pleasure	Producer	Patrick Brennan	—
"Remedy"	2022	Mitchell Bruce	Glitch	Producer	Mitchell Bruce	—
"Want From me"	2022	Mitchell Bruce	Glitch	Producer	Mitchell Bruce	—
"Stay"	2022	Mitchell Bruce	Glitch	Producer	Mitchell Bruce	—
"the Last Time"	2022	Mitchell Bruce	Glitch	Producer	Mitchell Bruce	—
"Carry On"	2022	Nikolas IV	TBA	Producer	Nikolas IV	—
"Cut Me Out"	2023	Nikolas IV	TBA	Producer	Nikolas IV - Jesse Saint John	—

=== Remixes ===
- Amy Winehouse – "Rehab" (2007)
- Chromeo – "Needy Girl" (2007)
- Dead Disco – "You're Out" (2007)
- Mika – "Relax, Take It Easy" (2007)
- Remi Nicole – "Rock N Roll" (2007)
- I Was a Cub Scout – "Out Smallest Adventures" (2007)
- Alphabeat – "Fascination" (2007)
- The Clik Clik – "Did You Wrong" (2008)
- Alphabeat – "10,000 Nights" (2008)
- CSS – "Move" (2008)
- Daft Punk – "Digital Love" (with Alphabeat and Leon Jean-Marie) (2008)
- David Swinburn – "Wrong Shoes (Frankmusik Remix)" (2008)
- Keane – "Perfect Symmetry" (2008)
- Go:Audio – "Made Up Stories" (2008)
- Telepathe – "Chrome's On It" (2008)
- The Black Ghosts – "I Want Nothing" (2008)
- Erasure – "Phantom Bride" (2009)
- Lady Gaga – "Eh, Eh (Nothing Else I Can Say)" (2009)
- Pet Shop Boys – "Love Etc." (2009)
- Space Cowboy – "Falling Down" (2009)
- Nelly Furtado – "Night Is Young" (2010)
- Natalia Kills – "Zombie" (2010)
- Tata Young – "Mission Is You" (2010)
- Erasure – "When I Start To (Break It All Down)" (2011)
- Nicole Scherzinger – "Right There" (2011)
- Natalia Kills – "Mirrors" (2011)
- Far East Movement – "Rocketeer" (2011)
- Killian Wells – "STRFKR" (2012)
- Simon Curtis – "Flesh" (2012)
- Alphabeat – "Love Sea" (2012)
- Ride the Universe – "A Little Better" (2012)
- Buffetlibre – "Fade Into You" (2013)
- Empire of the Sun – "Walking on a Dream" (2013)
- Ride the Universe – "You And I" (2013)
- FrankJavCee – "So Damn Beautiful" (2016)
