= Sarah Bay-Cheng =

American academic

- Occupations: Technology, media and theatre researcher and academic

Academic background
- Education: Wellesley College (BA); University of Michigan (PhD)

Sarah Bay-Cheng is a technology, media and theatre researcher and academic. She is the Helen and Paul Phelan Chair in Drama at the University of Toronto in Canada. Her research and commentary explores the interplay of technology and dramatic performance, particularly in the digital age. Her current book projects delve into the intersections of digital history and performance, alongside the history of experimental theater.

== Education & academic career ==
Bay-Cheng grew up in Sacramento, California. She received a BA in Theatre and Film Studies from Wellesley College in 1996, and a PhD in theatre from the University of Michigan in 2001. She has taught at Colgate University, the University at Buffalo, Bowdoin College, and was a dean at York University, before joining the University of Toronto in 2025 as Professor of Emerging Technologies in Theatre and Performance and the Helen and Paul Phelan Chair in Drama.

Bay-Cheng has written and edited 4 books and over 50 academic articles and essays related to the critical analysis of theatre, media and performance and its function in contemporary society. She has been interviewed by news outlets for her expertise regarding technology and performance, and for commentary on specific productions.

As an editor, she edited the book series, Avant-Gardes in Performance for Palgrave and contributed to the International Journal of Performance Arts and Media and the Journal of Dramatic Theory and Criticism, among others. She is currently the Vice-Chair for the Canadian Association of Fine Arts Deans, the International Council of Arts Deans, Factory Theatre (Toronto), and Contemporary Theatre Review, among others.

== Notable publications ==
- S. Bay-Cheng (2004). Mama Dada : Gertrude Stein’s Avant-Garde Theater. Routledge.
- S. Bay-Cheng and B. Cole (2010). Poets at play : An Anthology of Modernist Drama. Susquehanna University Press.
- S. Bay-Cheng, C. Kattenbelt, A. Lavender, R. Nelson, eds. (2010) Mapping Intermediality in Performance Amsterdam University Press.
- S. Bay-Cheng (2012). "Theater Is Media: Some Principles for a Digital Historiography of Performance." Theater 42 (2): 27–41.
- S. Bay-Cheng, J. Parker-Starbuck, D. Z. Saltz (2015). Performance and Media : Taxonomies for a Changing Field. University of Michigan Press.
