= Better Off as Two =

"Better Off As Two"

Single by Frankmusik

from the album Complete Me
- Released: 12 April 2009
- Length: 2:55
- Label: Island
- Songwriter(s): Vincent Turner
- Producer(s): Stuart Price

Frankmusik singles chronology
"3 Little Words" (2008)	"Better Off As Two" (2009)	"Confusion Girl" (2009)

"Better Off As Two" (titled "Better Off As 2" on the album) is a song by British electropop singer Frankmusik from his debut album Complete Me.

== Song information ==
The song was released in mid-April, 2009, and received favorable reviews. Digital Spy commented on the track saying that "With its quirky production, falsetto vocals and rousing chorus, 'Better Off As 2' encapsulates Frankmusik's eccentric yet accessible style in just three minutes". The site wrote that the song is "guaranteed to get the toes tapping of even the most musically illiterate, what's more exciting is that his best tunes are still to come."

== Music video ==
Produced in early 2009, the music video features CGI layered shots of Frankmusik and a dancing female. It was directed by Tim Pope.

== Track listings and formats ==
UK CD single (B001V5J4FU)

1. Better Off As Two
2. 3 Little Words (Paper Faces Remix)
3. Better Off As Two (Fan Death Remix)
4. Better Off As Two (Kissy Sell Out Remix)
5. In Step

Digital Download 1 (iTunes)

1. Better Off As Two
2. Time Will Tell

Digital Download 2 (iTunes)

1. Better Off As Two
2. Better Off As Two (Kissy Sell Out Says Relax)
3. Better Off As Two (Fan Death Rework)
4. Better Off As Two (Danny Dove & Steve Smart radio mix)
5. Better Off In Two (Frankmusik Remix)
6. Better Off As Two (A1 Bassline Remix)
7. Better Off As Two (Math Head Remix)

== Chart performance ==
The song entered the UK Singles Chart at #26 on 19 April 2009. It re-entered the chart at #98 on 9 August 2009 following the release of Frankmusik's album Complete Me.

=== Charts ===
Chart (2009/10)	Peak position
UK Singles (OCC)	26
