= 3 Little Words =

Single by Frankmusik

from the album Complete Me
- B-side: "Run Away from Trouble"
- Released: 23 November 2008
- Genre: Electropop
- Length: 2:46
- Label: Island
- Songwriter(s): Vincent Turner
- Producer(s): Stuart Price

Frankmusik singles chronology
"3 Little Words" (2008)	"Better Off as Two" (2009)

"3 Little Words" is a song by British electropop singer Frankmusik from his debut studio album Complete Me, which was released on 23 November 2008 as a digital download.

== Music video ==
The music video for the song was uploaded to YouTube on 7 October 2008.

== Track listing ==
Digital download
No.	Title	Length
1.	"3 Little Words"	2:46
2.	"3 Little Words" (Paper Faces Remix)	7:16
3.	"3 Little Words" (Blackstrobe Remix)	7:28
4.	"3 Little Words" (L-VIS 1990 Remix)	4:28
5.	"Run Away From Trouble"	4:22
6.	"3 Little Words" (Black Gardenia Version)	3:04

== Release history ==
Country	Date	Format	Label
United Kingdom	23 November 2008	Digital download	Island Records
