= Do It in the AM =

Studio album by Frankmusik
- Released: 23 September 2011
- Recorded: 2009–11
- Genre: Electropop
- Length: 43:41
- Label: Island
- Producer: Frankmusik, Martin "Cherry Cherry Boom Boom" Kierszenbaum

Frankmusik chronology
Complete Me (2009)	Do It in the AM (2011)	Between (2013)

Singles from Do It in the AM
- 1. "The Fear Inside" Released: 19 December 2010; 2. "Do It in the AM" Released: 3 May 2011; 3. "No I.D." Released: 6 September 2011

Professional ratings
Aggregate scores
Source	Rating
Metacritic	(58/100)
Review scores
Source	Rating
AllMusic	2.5/5 stars
The Independent	(favourable)
musicOMH	2/5 stars

Do It in the AM is the second studio album by English recording artist Frankmusik. It was released in the United Kingdom on 26 September 2011 by Island Records. Preceding its release, the album's eponymous official lead single "Do it in the AM", which features labelmates Far East Movement, was released in the US on 3 May 2011 and in the UK on 1 August 2011. The album's title was revealed in a press release issued on Frankmusik's Myspace page.

== Background and development ==
On 29 September 2009, Frankmusik stated on his Twitter page that he had begun working upon new material for Do it in the AM. In November 2009, he moved to Los Angeles because he "wanted to sever any semblance of a safety net." He later stated in an interview that he made the move to LA because he "needed to have a fresh start, just to keep creative. Keep the story interesting, you know? Just move on." In 2010, it was announced that Frankmusik had been signed to Cherrytree Records, an imprint of Interscope Records, by its founder, Martin Kierszenbaum.

By the end of 2010, Frankmusik had already announced the release of a promo single off the record, "The Fear Inside".

== Composition ==
Upon comparing Do It in the AM to his debut album, Complete Me (2009), Frankmusik stated:

It's a different record, I'll give you the heads up. [...] You're looking at me in a completely different place now, internally and externally. I was in London and I didn't know what I was doing. I was just starting out and there was a real rawness to that record. This new record has got a bit more finesse to it. It's got a bit of an American twang to it, 'cause fuck it; I'm in America. What do you expect? Complete Me had a bit of that London, kind of edgy, alternative feel to it. So I've tried to progress; I've finessed the songwriting, the songs are a lot more punchy. They're a bit more concise. So when people are gonna say it isn't me, "Frankmusik sold out," I'll just say "No, Frankmusik got more fucking concise," and they can suck a dick.

In that same interview, he also stated that "there's a lot of 'twinsies' kind of tracks on the album. I have, like, this one week of being in this one particular zone, into this one sound, so there's a lot of tracks that are kind of like grouped." He cited "The Fear Inside" and another song off the album, "Running", as prime examples of this concept. In an interview with Digital Spy, he expressed interest in working with fellow English singer-songwriter Ellie Goulding on a track for the album. Frankmusik worked previously with Goulding to produce the song "Wish I Stayed" on her debut album Lights.

== Release ==
On 26 September 2011, it was announced that Frankmusik would release thirteen free tracks on his official website, which will be available to those who have bought Do It in the AM either physically or digitally, with a unique activation code included with each format. The new songs will be unveiled every Friday up until Christmas and will become part of Frankmusik's The Voyage Collection. According to him, "These songs were chosen as a behind the scenes glance into what never makes the record." The downloads were available for a limited time, but became unavailable after Frankmusik was dropped by Island Records.

=== Singles ===
"The Fear Inside" was released as a buzz single in November 2009. The music video premiered on 2 December 2010 and was directed by G. An EP was released on the UK iTunes Store on 19 December 2010, while a remix EP was released on the US iTunes Store on 18 January 2011. "Do It in the AM" was released as the album's official lead single on 3 May 2011 and features Far East Movement. Follow-up single "No I.D." was released on 6 September 2011 and features Colette Carr.

== Commercial performance ==
Upon its release the album failed to chart, and by 2013 was reported to have sold 2,000 copies in the US according to Nielsen Soundscan.

== Track listing ==
- All tracks produced by Frankmusik and Cherry Cherry Boom Boom
- Additional production on tracks 3 and 7 by Billboard

No.	Title	Writer(s)	{{{extra_column}}}	Length
1.	"We Collide"	Vincent Turner; Martin Kierszenbaum	Frankmusik; Cherry Cherry Boom Boom	3:15
2.	"No I.D." (featuring Colette Carr)	Turner; Colette Carr; Nick Dresti; Kierszenbaum	Frankmusik; Cherry Cherry Boom Boom	3:12
3.	"Do It in the AM" (featuring Far East Movement)	Turner; Kierszenbaum; Jae Choung; Kevin Nishimura; James Roh; Virman Coquia	Frankmusik; Cherry Cherry Boom Boom; Billboard*	3:29
4.	"No Champagne" (featuring Natalia Kills)	Turner; Kierszenbaum	Frankmusik; Cherry Cherry Boom Boom	3:15
5.	"Footsteps"	Turner; Kierszenbaum	Frankmusik; Cherry Cherry Boom Boom	2:55
6.	"The Fear Inside"	Turner; Kierszenbaum	Frankmusik; Cherry Cherry Boom Boom	3:24
7.	"Wrecking Ball"	Turner	Frankmusik; Cherry Cherry Boom Boom; Billboard*	3:23
8.	"Running"	Turner; Kierszenbaum	Frankmusik; Cherry Cherry Boom Boom	3:43
9.	"Brake Lights"	Turner; Kierszenbaum	Frankmusik; Cherry Cherry Boom Boom	2:47
10.	"Struck by Lightning"	Turner	Frankmusik; Cherry Cherry Boom Boom	3:26
11.	"Ludicrous"	Turner	Frankmusik; Cherry Cherry Boom Boom	4:02
12.	"Blame It on Me"	Turner	Frankmusik; Cherry Cherry Boom Boom	3:16
13.	"Cut Me Down"	Turner	Frankmusik; Cherry Cherry Boom Boom	3:34

The Voyage Collection
No.	Title	Writer(s)	Length
1.	"Listen to My Heart"	Released – Sept.24th	3:53
2.	"Watch Me Fade"	Released – 30 Sep	3:38
3.	"Forever and a Day"	Released – Oct.7th	3:32
4.	"Didn't Know My Name"	Released – Oct.14th	3:12
5.	"Dancing in the Dark"	Released – Oct.21st	3:35
6.	"Stereo World"	Released – Oct.28th	3:31
7.	"Insomniacs"	Released – Nov.4th	3:29
8.	"On the Brink"	Released – Nov.11th	3:41
9.	"Just Fine"	Released – Nov .14th	3:13
10.	"Whatever Happened"	Released – Nov.25th	3:11
11.	"A Thousand Miles"	Released – Dec.2nd	3:19
12.	"Star Taker"	Released – Dec.9th	3:45
13.	"We All Talk Alone"	Released – Dec.16th	3:39

== Personnel ==
- Frankmusik – vocals, producer, instrumentation, programming
- Billboard – additional producer (tracks 3, 7)
- Louis Bloom – A&R
- Colette Carr – vocals (track 2)
- Far East Movement – vocals (track 3)
- Cassandra Gracey – management
- Gene Grimaldi – mastering
- Martin "Cherry Cherry Boom Boom" Kierszenbaum – producer, instrumentation, programming
- Natalia Kills – vocals (track 4)
- Robert Orton – mixing
- Jam Sutton – photography

== Release history ==
Country	Date	Label
Ireland	23 September 2011	Island Records
United Kingdom	26 September 2011	Island Records
United States	27 September 2011	Cherrytree Records, Interscope Records
