= Regret (Everything Everything song) =

Single by Everything Everything

from the album Get to Heaven
- Released: 29 April 2015
- Recorded: 2014
- Genre: Indie pop
- Length: 3:22
- Label: RCA Victor
- Songwriter(s): Jonathan Higgs; Jeremy Pritchard; Michael Spearman; Alex Robertshaw
- Producer(s): Stuart Price; Everything Everything

Everything Everything singles chronology
"Distant Past" (2015)	"Regret" (2015)	"Spring / Sun / Winter / Dread" (2015)

"Regret" is a song from British indie pop band Everything Everything. The track was released in the United Kingdom on 29 April 2015 as the second single from the band's third studio album, Get to Heaven. The song premiered as BBC Radio 1 DJ Annie Mac's Hottest Record in the World on 29 April 2015.

== Track listing ==
Digital download
No.	Title	Length
1.	"Regret"	3:23

7" vinyl
No.	Title	Length
1.	"Regret"	3:23
2.	"Magnetophone"	3:31

== Charts ==
Chart (2015)	Peak position
Belgium (Ultratip Bubbling Under Flanders)	39
UK Singles (OCC)	119

== Release history ==
Region	Date	Format
United Kingdom	29 April 2015	Digital download
United Kingdom	22 June 2015	7" vinyl
