= Katrina Woolverton =

American singer-songwriter

- Born: Katrina Abrahemian
- Origin: Los Angeles, California
- Genres: Blues, Pop
- Occupations: Singer-songwriter
- Instruments: Vocals, piano, guitar
- Years active: 2008-present
- Label: Red Red Records
- Website: Official

Katrina Woolverton (born Katrina Abrahemian on August 19, 1977) is an American singer/songwriter and recording artist from Los Angeles, California. Most recently, she released an EP in 2017 titled Better Now (RED RED/SONY/RED/BDG), with the signature single from the EP, "Hold Me Down", charting on the Billboard Adult Top 40 chart at #38.

== Early life ==
Woolverton was born in the San Fernando Valley. By age 3, after daily serenades from her mother, Katrina started singing solos and making up her own songs. She started performing by age 5 and started formal singing lessons at age 9. At age 11, Katrina’s mother recognized the strength of her voice, and entered her as a contestant on the television talent competition Star Search. Katrina won seven consecutive rounds of the competition, winning the Star Search category after competing against future R&B singer Aaliyah. Following her win, Katrina was pursued by multiple management companies, record labels, and other entertainment entities interested in advancing her talent. Due to her parents' divorce, she chose not to pursue a professional singing career at that time and instead chose to focus on her education. Katrina did continue to sing in high school, and performed in bands with friends. She also sang in the high school choir, chosen for a range of parts after the choir director realized she could sing alto, tenor and soprano parts effortlessly, and learn them by ear. Woolverton also began writing songs at this time.

== Career ==
In 2007 Katrina was featured on the soundtrack for the film "Triloquist": she sang three songs "Billy Boy" which she also arranged, "Beautiful Dreamer" and "Demented Dreamer". Following the film's release she began writing songs with Josh Sklair, a Grammy-winning producer best known for his work with Etta James. In 2009, Woolverton began working with another Grammy-winning producer Val Garay, who had been involved with records by James Taylor, Bonnie Raitt, Linda Ronstadt, and Elton John. They collaborated with songwriter Bonnie Hayes and wrote the songs for Woolverton's first album, In the Blink of an Eye.

Katrina Woolverton rose to fame in 2011 with the release of her debut album In the Blink of an Eye that featured three top charting singles, "Shame on Me" (#1 on iHeartRadio Top 20 On Demand Adult Chart and #46 on the Billboard Hot AC Chart), "OPM" (#26 Billboard Hot Dance) and "So Eden" (Billboard Hot AC Top 50). Katrina was named iHeartRadio's "Artist to Watch in 2011" and was the opening act in the US for Meat Loaf during the Mad, Mad World Tour 2012. In 2012 and 2013 she released two stand-alone singles, "Watch Me Walk Away" (#43 Billboard Hot AC) the only non-Woolverton composition she has recorded—originally penned by Katy Perry along with co-writers Charlie Midnight and Holly Knight; and "Ready to Love", collaborating with electropop producer/remixer Frankmusik (Vincent Frank) who has worked with Ellie Goulding ("Wish I Stayed"), and many others. "Ready to Love" reached number 33 on the Billboard Dance/Electronic Songs chart, and number 12 on the Billboard Dance Club Songs chart. In 2015, enthusiastic fan response to a stripped down live rendition of "Shame On Me" prompted Woolverton to record and release an acoustic version of the song along with the single "Heatwave" while working on the Better Now EP. “Heatwave” had a corresponding video featuring animation from artist Squindo.

In 2017 she participated in multiple live tours and events, opening for Blues Traveler icon John Popper in spring and autumn tours. She also appeared with John Rzeznik of the Goo Goo Dolls, and with the Revivalists at various Breast Cancer Awareness events to lend her support in the fight to end breast cancer and toured with singer/songwriter Jon McLaughlin. In April 2018 Katrina toured again with John Popper, opening for him in a series of spring dates.

Katrina’s 2017 release Better Now is a six-track EP. Alongside "Hold Me Down", songs include the title track "Better Now" (co-written with Grammy winner Amy Wadge who co-penned Ed Sheeran’s 2016 Grammy winning song, “Thinking Out Loud”), "Open Hearted", "Known Better", "Lonely Heart", and "Heart Beats". The EP, produced by Mikal Blue (One Republic, Colbie Caillat, Jason Mraz), and engineered by Blue with Jonathan Sagis, was recorded mostly in London with co-production by Jez Coad, Jules Wolfson and Katrina with Blue sharing co-writing credits on "Hold Me Down". Included in Better Now’s mix of contributors/songwriters alongside Blue and Wadge are Raja Kumari (Gwen Stefani, Fall Out Boy) and Jules Wolfson (co-founder of Nexus Music with more than 100 gold and platinum certifications.

== Discography ==
=== Albums ===
- In the Blink of an Eye (2011, Red Red Records)
- Better Now EP (2017 Red Red/SONY/BDG)

=== Singles ===
- "A Place in the Sun" with Pablo Cruise (2011, Red Red/SONY)
- "Shame On Me" (2011, Red Red/SONY)
- "So Eden" (2011, Red Red/SONY)
- "OPM" (2011, Red Red/SONY) – remixed by Dave Audé
- "Watch Me Walk Away" (2012, Red Red/SONY)
- "Ready to Love" (2013, Red Red/SONY)
- "Heatwave" (2015, Red Red/Brody/SONY)
