= Distant Past (song) =

Single by Everything Everything

from the album Get to Heaven
- Released: 18 February 2015
- Recorded: 2014
- Genre: Art pop
- Length: 3:41
- Label: RCA Victor
- Songwriter(s): Jonathan Higgs; Jeremy Pritchard; Michael Spearman; Alex Robertshaw
- Producer(s): Stuart Price; Everything Everything

Everything Everything singles chronology
"Don't Try" (2013)	"Distant Past" (2015)	"Regret" (2015)

"Distant Past" is a song recorded by British indie pop band Everything Everything. The track was released in the United Kingdom by Sony on 18 February 2015 as the lead single from the band's third studio album, Get to Heaven. It was written by band members Jonathan Higgs, Jeremy Pritchard, Michael Spearman, and Alex Robertshaw, and was produced by Stuart Price. The song, like much of the album it appears on, reflects on the events of 2014, with chief songwriter Higgs explaining that it "[looks] at the fact that history repeats itself".

== Release and reception ==
Prior to the song's release, Everything Everything featured lines of lyrics from their upcoming album on social media outlets Facebook and Twitter. The lyrics were released gradually over the course of two weeks, concluding with a line from "Distant Past" on 17 Feb 2015. On the same day, the song premiered on BBC Radio 1 as Zane Lowe's 'Hottest Record in the World'. On 3 March, Radio 1 featured the song as "Track of the Day". It has thus far peaked at #88 on the UK Singles Chart. The song is also featured in FIFA 16.

== Music video ==
A music video for "Distant Past" was directed by the band's frontman and lead vocalist, Jonathan Higgs, who stated "Distant Past is about primal human nature, and no matter how far we progress in our civilisations, we can never escape it."

The music video was filmed in Cheddar Gorge and stars British wrestler Ed Gamester. The narrative of the video is centered on a fight scene between two cavemen, and also includes shots of the four band members singing against a blue-white background. Higgs explained this as "a strong contrast between the 'past' and 'future' scenes, to emphasise the primal nature of the past and the overly civilised future." The fight scene's time period is ambiguous due to the brief appearance of a QWERTY keyboard.

== Trivia ==
The track features a recreation of the bridge scanner sound from the original Star Trek TV show.

== Track listing ==
Digital download
No.	Title	Length
1.	"Distant Past"	3:41

7" vinyl
No.	Title	Length
1.	"Distant Past"	3:41
2.	"Pressure"	3:43

== Charts ==
Chart (2015)	Peak position
Belgium (Ultratip Bubbling Under Flanders)	79
Scotland (OCC)	81
UK Singles (OCC)	88

== Release history ==
Region	Date	Format
United Kingdom	18 February 2015	Digital download
