= A Fever Dream =

Studio album by Everything Everything
- Released: 18 August 2017
- Recorded: 2016–2017
- Studios: Parr Street Studios (Liverpool); Angelic Studio (Brackley, Northamptonshire); Snap Studios (London); Making Do (Manchester); Crotch International (Gilsland); Alex Robertshaw's flat (London)
- Genres: Indie pop; art pop; indie rock
- Length: 46:30
- Label: RCA Victor
- Producers: James Ford; Everything Everything

Everything Everything chronology
Get to Heaven (2015)	A Fever Dream (2017)	Re-Animator (2020)

Singles from A Fever Dream
- 1. "Can't Do" Released: 14 June 2017; 2. "A Fever Dream" Released: 21 July 2017; 3. "Desire" Released: 2 August 2017; 4. "Night of the Long Knives" Released: 25 October 2017

A Fever Dream is the fourth studio album by English band Everything Everything. Recorded with producer James Ford of Simian Mobile Disco and mixed by Cenzo Townshend, it was released on 18 August 2017 on RCA Records. It peaked at number five on the UK Albums Chart, Everything Everything's joint-highest album charting position. The tracks "Can't Do", "A Fever Dream", "Desire", and "Night of the Long Knives" were released as singles throughout 2017. The album was nominated for the Mercury Prize in 2018, ultimately losing out to Wolf Alice's Visions of a Life.

== Background and recording ==
Following the release of their third studio album, Get to Heaven (2015), Everything Everything sought a less protracted approach to making its follow-up. Bassist Jeremy Pritchard described the recording of Get to Heaven as a period of uncertainty and diminished confidence, contrasting it with the renewed enthusiasm the band experienced while touring the album. Rather than taking a break from performing to concentrate on songwriting, as they had done for their previous record, the members continued writing throughout the tour. Pritchard said that alternating between touring and composing helped prevent the band from becoming dissatisfied with either activity. He characterised A Fever Dream as a companion to Get to Heaven, exploring the emotional consequences of the political and social anxieties addressed on the earlier album.

Much of the album was developed by vocalist Jonathan Higgs and guitarist Alex Robertshaw while travelling between concerts. The pair worked together on a tour bus, exchanging musical ideas and initially naming some compositions after the cities in which they were written. Higgs subsequently described the process as more collaborative than that of the band's previous albums, explaining that the musicians had accumulated hundreds of ideas before entering the recording studio. After touring concluded in September 2016, the band continued developing demos and rehearsing in Manchester and at Robertshaw's flat in London. By February 2017, they were preparing to record with producer James Ford, whose previous work included albums by Arctic Monkeys and Foals.

Recording took place initially at Parr Street Studios in Liverpool and subsequently at Angelic Studio in Oxfordshire, where the band had previously worked on Arc (2013) and Get to Heaven. The band credited Ford with encouraging a more spontaneous approach, reducing rehearsal and generally limiting performances to two or three takes; some songs were recorded the same day they were written. Higgs said they wanted to avoid the overly considered quality of their earlier recordings and preserve the immediacy of initial performances. He also left some lyrics unfinished until the recording sessions, occasionally improvising passages while recording vocals.

== Composition ==
=== Music ===
The music of A Fever Dream combines guitar-driven art rock with electronic pop and dance rhythms. Critics identified angular guitar riffs, syncopated percussion, prominent bass lines and synthesiser effects, alongside Higgs's distinctive falsetto vocals. The band said it had sought to combine heavier guitar sounds with early 1990s electronic music, while incorporating more contemplative passages than on Get to Heaven (2015). In contrast to that album's sustained intensity, the musicians wanted to reintroduce some of the tenderness and slower-paced material associated with Arc (2013).

The album's opening track, "Night of the Long Knives", features short, staccato phrases passed between instruments, accompanied by driving drums, bass guitar and synthesiser effects resembling sirens. Anna Alger of Exclaim! described the combination of a disjointed rhythm, prominent bass and guitarist Robertshaw's angular riff on "Big Game", while Rachel Aroesti of The Guardian compared the electronic bass lines and percussion of "Can't Do" to the music of New Order.

Elsewhere, the arrangements contrast restrained passages with dense layers of instrumentation. "Put Me Together" begins with subdued electronic drums, keyboards, and manipulated vocal samples before building into a mixture of guitar, electronic noise, and improvised drumming. The title track similarly develops from a piano-led opening into a more forceful, rhythmically driven arrangement. By contrast, "New Deep" is a brief, sparsely arranged piano ballad, which Phil Mongredien of The Observer identified as a departure from the band's usual sound.

Despite the album's unconventional rhythms and shifts in texture, several critics observed a movement towards more conventional songwriting. Marcy Donelson of AllMusic considered its song structures less unpredictable than those of the band's earlier albums, while Jazz Monroe of Pitchfork described the arrangements as more accessible. Jordan Foster of The Line of Best Fit, however, noted that the album's quieter second half departed from the succession of energetic pop songs that characterised Get to Heaven.

=== Lyrics ===
The lyrics of A Fever Dream address political upheaval, social division, and their effects on personal relationships. Higgs said that, rather than revisit the global threats explored on Get to Heaven, he wanted to examine how events such as Brexit and the election of Donald Trump had affected individuals and their relationships with others. He was particularly interested in growing distrust of neighbours, the media, the police, and political institutions. Writing for Pitchfork, Jazz Monroe observed that the album addressed contemporary political anxieties through surreal imagery, satire, and characters whose perspectives were not always explicitly explained.

Higgs said that he sought to explore conflicting political viewpoints rather than simply express his own opinions. He described "Run the Numbers" as "our pro-Brexit song, despite my personal view"; the song was inspired by a remark from Michael Gove about public distrust of experts during the referendum campaign. "Big Game", by contrast, ridicules Trump through deliberately childish insults, while "Ivory Tower" depicts hostility between opposing political groups. Higgs explained that "Ivory Tower" presents exaggerated versions of these opposing viewpoints and contains references to the murder of Jo Cox, the British MP killed during the Brexit referendum campaign.

Alongside its political subject matter, the album explores isolation, uncertainty, and emotional vulnerability. Higgs described "Put Me Together" as a song about suspicion between neighbours and the breakdown of trust within communities, particularly across generational, racial, and social divisions. He also said that the album's lyrics were more personal than those of its predecessors, reflecting a desire to address relationships as well as broader social concerns. The closing track, "White Whale", is a love song inspired by his relationship with his girlfriend. Higgs said that its expression of personal affection also carried a broader message of hope, suggesting that society could overcome its divisions and improve.

== Release and promotion ==
Everything Everything announced A Fever Dream on 13 June 2017, alongside the release of its lead single, "Can't Do", which premiered on Annie Mac's BBC Radio 1 programme. The band subsequently previewed material from the album at a series of intimate UK concerts, including a performance at London's Heaven on 21 June, where seven new songs were performed. They also made an unannounced appearance at the 2017 Glastonbury Festival, performing songs from the forthcoming album.

The album's title was taken from its title track, which was released on 21 July 2017 alongside a recording of a live performance in London. Higgs explained that he had chosen the title to convey the sense of uncertainty and unreality he associated with contemporary events, describing a period in which familiar circumstances appeared to be changing unpredictably. A third song, "Desire", was released on 2 August, accompanied by a music video featuring the band performing inside a room surrounded by illuminated video screens.

A Fever Dream was released on 18 August 2017 through RCA Records. It debuted at number five on the UK Albums Chart, matching the peak position of the band's second album, Arc (2013). In October, the band released a music video for "Night of the Long Knives", directed by Kit Monteith.

The band promoted the album through concerts and festival appearances in the UK and abroad. In August 2017, they announced an eight-date tour of Ireland and the UK for February and March 2018, concluding at London's Alexandra Palace on 10 March. The Alexandra Palace performance was their largest headline concert to that point.

== Critical reception ==
Professional ratings
Aggregate scores
Source	Rating
AnyDecentMusic?	7.7/10
Metacritic	81/100
Review scores
Source	Rating
AllMusic	4/5 stars
Exclaim!	9/10
The Guardian	4/5 stars
The Irish Times	4/5 stars
Mojo	4/5 stars
NME	4/5 stars
The Observer	4/5 stars
Pitchfork	7.1/10
Q	4/5 stars
Uncut	6/10

A Fever Dream received predominantly positive reviews from music critics. At review aggregator Metacritic, the album received a weighted average score of 81 out of 100, based on 18 reviews, indicating "universal acclaim". Critics generally praised the band's musical inventiveness, political commentary, and combination of energetic and restrained arrangements, although some questioned its more conventional songwriting.

Anna Alger of Exclaim! awarded the album nine out of ten, praising the band's ability to develop its sound while retaining its melodic and rhythmic complexity. She particularly commended the contrast between quieter passages and more forceful arrangements, arguing that the album's more personal approach to political anxieties was effective. Writing for The Line of Best Fit, Jordan Foster similarly praised the album's cohesion, describing it as a development of the band's previous work. He noted that its comparatively restrained second half made it less immediately accessible than Get to Heaven, but considered its production and gradual shifts in intensity among its strengths. Lauren Murphy of The Irish Times praised the band's musical ambition and ability to combine dark lyrical themes with energetic arrangements, while Phil Mongredien of The Observer highlighted the inventiveness of the instrumentation and the emotional effectiveness of the more subdued "New Deep".

Other reviewers were more qualified in their praise. Rachel Aroesti of The Guardian commended the album's treatment of contemporary political unease and its experimental arrangements, but criticised the repetitive choruses of "Desire" and "Can't Do", which she considered at odds with the inventiveness of the surrounding music. She nevertheless regarded the album's subtler passages as particularly successful. Jazz Monroe of Pitchfork praised Higgs's dark humour, political satire, and emotionally expressive lyrics, but considered the increasingly straightforward arrangements less compelling than the band's earlier, more unpredictable work. In a less favourable review for No Ripcord, Juan Edgardo Rodríguez argued that some of the political lyrics lacked specificity and that the band's increasingly controlled arrangements diminished its distinctive qualities, despite the album's rhythmic inventiveness.

The album was shortlisted for the 2018 Mercury Prize, marking Everything Everything's second nomination for the award. At the 2018 Ivor Novello Awards, A Fever Dream was nominated for the Album Award, while "Can't Do" received a nomination for Best Song Musically and Lyrically. The album subsequently won UK Album of the Year at the Music Producers Guild Awards in 2019. Its producer, James Ford, also received the ceremony's UK Producer of the Year award for his work on A Fever Dream and albums by Arctic Monkeys and Gorillaz.

== Track listing ==
All songs by Jonathan Higgs, Jeremy Pritchard, Alex Robertshaw, Michael Spearman. Lyrics by Jonathan Higgs.

No.	Title	Length
1.	"Night of the Long Knives"	4:38
2.	"Can't Do"	3:32
3.	"Desire"	3:25
4.	"Big Game"	3:48
5.	"Good Shot, Good Soldier"	4:51
6.	"Run the Numbers"	3:39
7.	"Put Me Together"	5:33
8.	"A Fever Dream"	5:59
9.	"Ivory Tower"	3:54
10.	"New Deep"	2:27
11.	"White Whale"	4:50

Sample credits

- "A Fever Dream" contains an audio sample of "Loquebanteur Variis Linguis" by Thomas Tallis, performed by Oxford Camerata, recorded in the Chapel of Wellington College, 1992. Conducted by Jeremy Summerly, produced by Chris Cracker, engineered by Dave Harris, licensed courtesy of Naxos.

== Personnel ==
Adapted from the A Fever Dream liner notes.

Everything Everything
- Jonathan Higgs – vocals, guitar, keyboards, programming
- Jeremy Pritchard – bass guitar, backing vocals, keyboards
- Alex Robertshaw – guitar, backing vocals, programming, keyboards
- Michael Spearman – drums, percussion, keyboards, backing vocals

Artwork

- Paul Phung – photography
- Joe Mortimer – art direction, graphic design, typography
- Billy Bull – graphic design, typography

Production

- James Ford – production
- Jimmy Robertson – engineering
- Everything Everything – recording, production, additional engineering
- John Davis – mastering
- Cenzo Townshend – mixing
- Archie Carter, Luke Gibbs, Ben McClusky, Rob Sellens, Chris Taylor – recording assistants

== Charts ==
Chart (2017)	Peak position
Australian Albums (ARIA)	68
Irish Albums (IRMA)	39
Scottish Albums (Official Charts)	13
UK Albums (Official Charts)	5
