= Everything Everything =

English art rock band

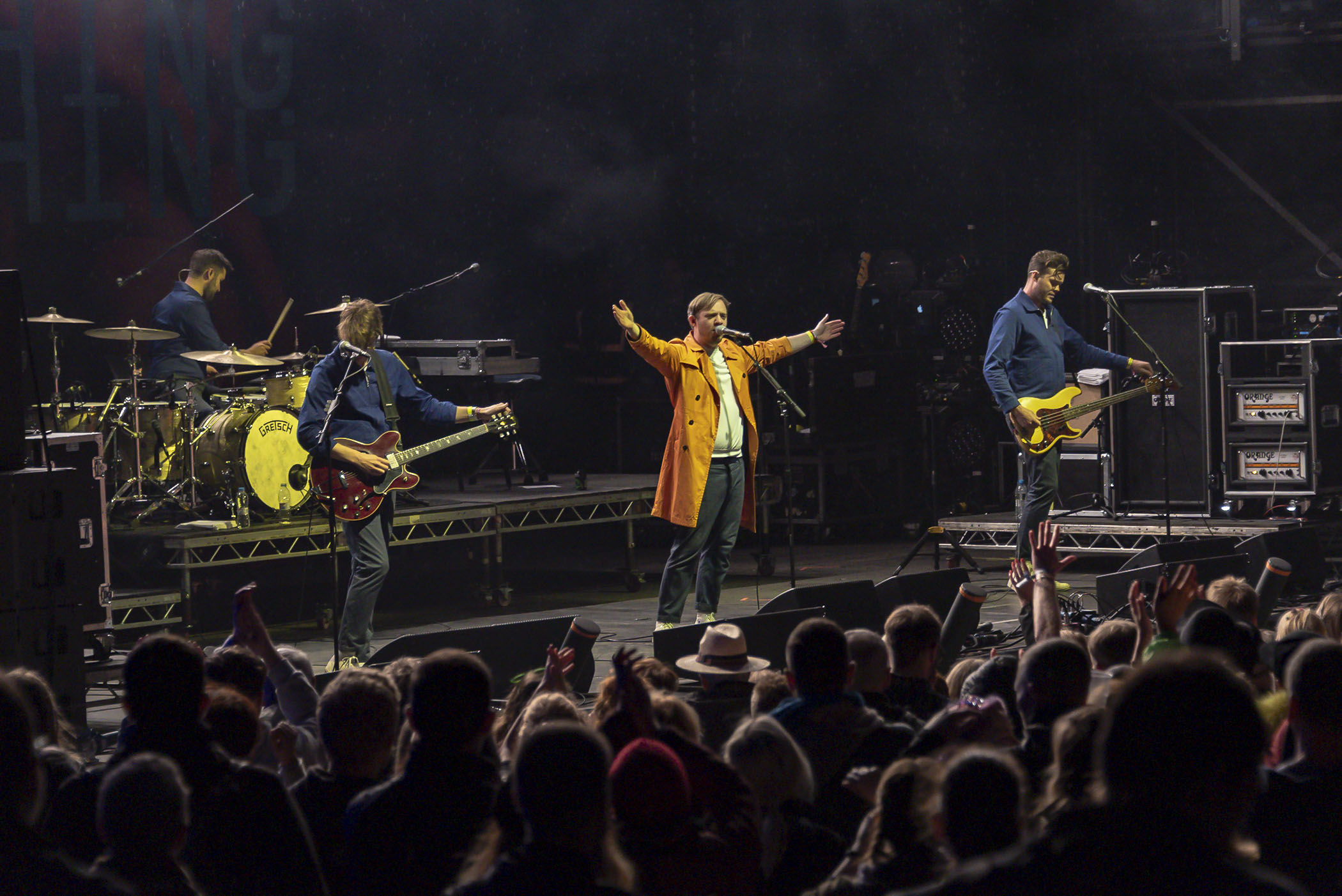
- Performing at Festival No. 6, Portmeirion, September 2018

Background information
- Origin: Salford, England
- Genres: Art pop; art rock; indie rock; progressive rock; electronica; experimental pop
- Years active: 2007–present
- Labels: Geffen; RCA; Vinyl Junkie; Cult; AWAL; Infinity Industries; BMG UK
- Members: Jonathan Higgs; Jeremy Pritchard; Michael Spearman; Alex Robertshaw
- Past members: Alex Niven
- Website: everything-everything.co.uk

Everything Everything are an English art rock band from Salford that formed in late 2007. Noted for their eclectic sound and complex, avant-garde-inspired lyrics, the band has released seven albums to date — Man Alive (2010), Arc (2013), Get to Heaven (2015), A Fever Dream (2017), Re-Animator (2020), Raw Data Feel (2022) and Mountainhead (2024) — and has been widely critically acclaimed. Their work has twice been shortlisted for the Mercury Music Prize and has received five nominations for Ivor Novello Awards.

== Career ==
=== Origins and early singles ===
Three of the original band members are from Northumberland, England - Jonathan Higgs (lead vocals, keyboards, laptop and guitar) grew up in the border village of Gilsland while Michael Spearman (drums, vocals) and Alex Niven (guitars, vocals) are from Newbrough. The three met at Queen Elizabeth High School in Hexham where they played music together.

While Spearman attended Berklee College of Music and Leeds College of Music to study jazz drumming, Higgs went on to study for a degree in Popular Music and Recording at Salford University, where he met Hampshire-born bass player Jeremy Pritchard. Pritchard moved to Tunbridge Wells at a very young age and regularly played at the Tunbridge Wells Forum in his teenage years. Higgs and Pritchard decided to form a band once their degree had finished. Initially they collaborated in the Salford-based math rock trio Modern Bison (with Higgs on drums, Pritchard on guitar and Mike Carswell on guitar and vocals), which released one album, I Could Have Had a Rustic Pagoda on unlabel in 2006.

Towards the end of 2006, Higgs and Niven devised plans to start a band "with a sort of Paul Morley-inspired, poptimist aesthetic". The band took the name Everything Everything from the first two words of the Radiohead song "Everything in Its Right Place", the opening track to their album Kid A, although Niven has also described the choice as follows: "The idea as I saw it was to try to take contemporary R&B pop music and fashion a vaguely Futurist project out of it, and between the two of us we chose the name Everything Everything, a détournement of sorts of an over-saturated media culture into something idealistic and expansive." With the addition of Pritchard and Spearman, the band began performing in the autumn of 2007. Pritchard recalls "we were initially more punky, with more guitars and no synths at all. It was easiest to play gigs like this and to get to grips with playing together. But the plan was always to expand the sound when we had the scope/could afford the gear!"

Quickly gaining attention from the music industry, the band began working with producer David Kosten (Bat for Lashes, Faultline). Everything Everything released their first single "Suffragette Suffragette" on 1 December 2008 through XL Recordings offshoot Salvia as a limited 7" vinyl release only. This was later followed by the release of single "Photoshop Handsome", which saw the group incorporate synths in their sound for the first time, on 20 July 2009, available only as a limited 7" single. In autumn 2009, the band then released "My Kz, Ur Bf" as another vinyl-only release, this time with the record label Young & Lost Club. All three singles were released with accompanying music videos, with those for "Suffragette Suffragette" and "Photoshop Handsome" made entirely by the band themselves.

At this point, Niven left the band to pursue a career in academia and was replaced by Guernsey-born guitarist Alex Robertshaw, whose former band Operahouse had split up a few months previously.

Everything Everything made the longlist of the BBC Sound of 2010 on 7 December 2009, a list created by Britain's tastemakers who vote for their favourite new artists.

Not long after the nomination for BBC Sound of 2010, Everything Everything signed to the UK arm of Geffen Records before releasing the single "Schoolin'" on 10 June 2010 as a CD single, digital download and also as a 7" vinyl. The single became the first to make an impact on the chart, debuting at number 152.

=== 2010–2012: Man Alive ===
The band's debut album Man Alive (produced by David Kosten) was released on 27 August 2010 and was preceded by a reissue of the single "My Kz, Ur Bf" on 23 August 2010, debuting on the UK singles chart at number 121. The album was then released a week later, debuting on the UK Albums Chart at number 17.

Man Alive received high critical praise from some reviewers, though others were critical. NME dubbed the band as "pop's new Picassos" and commented "there are three dirty words in indie right now: ambition, intellect and effort. Everything Everything don't just fit those terms, they pole-vault over them." BBC Music hailed the band's "brilliance" and noted "this Manchester quartet flee from any identikit indie clique, throwing ever-changing, protean sonic shapes... EE are wilfully eccentric, and endlessly entertaining, but they know more than most how to craft a song, how to make an album. They know how to give it depth, light and dark, and they – crucially – know when to stop." Drowned in Sound praised the band's "sheer, rampant confidence" and described the album as containing "some pretty spiffy stuff...this is a band going places – they know it, and we know it." Writing in Pitchfork, Ian Cohen commented that the album was "proof that enthusiastic experimentation can't save your end product when the underlying elements are so incompatible and unappetizing" and criticized Higgs's "irritating voice". On 19 July 2011 Man Alive was shortlisted for the 2011 Mercury Prize, although it lost out to PJ Harvey's Let England Shake.

In May 2011, Everything Everything performed at Radio 1's Big Weekend in Carlisle. This was a gig close to home for Jonathan Higgs, who grew up in Gilsland only a few miles away. On 28 November 2011 (along with local Manchester musicians Badly Drawn Boy and I Am Kloot) Everything Everything performed as part of the Billie Butterfly charity concert, raising funds for American medical treatment for Billie Bainbridge, a local young girl diagnosed with a rare brain tumour.

The band went on to support Snow Patrol in February 2012, and Muse in November and December.

=== 2012–2014: Arc ===
In 2012, Everything Everything resumed work with David Kosten on sessions for their second album. The first single from the sessions was "Cough Cough", released on 28 August 2012: following which the band announced that their second album Arc would be released in early 2013. New material from this album was performed in a UK tour spanning 13 September to 26 October 2012.

Arc was released on 14 January 2013, and debuted at number 5 on the UK Albums Chart. Higgs noted that in comparison to the complexity of the songs on Man Alive, the songwriting on Arc was intended to be a simpler distillation of his ideas and a more direct expression of his emotion. In an interview with the New Statesman, he explained that the new album was "far more open. It's far less cluttered and far less difficult to work out what's going on or what I'm saying. I think we tried to straighten it out and make it less distracting and more solid and strong. There are fewer places to hide I think, so that's the main thing. It's clear now who's doing what. It took us a long time to be confident enough to do that."

The album was hailed as "another tour de force" by The Observer, although The Guardian was more sparing with praise - "Jerky opener Cough Cough may showcase them at their most self-consciously wacky, but The Peaks is at the opposite end of the spectrum, attempting the kind of stadium melancholia beloved of Elbow or Coldplay. Inevitably, Arc lacks coherence; it's the sound of a band working out who they want to be. Hopefully that'll be the band that combines both modes seamlessly, as they do on Kemosabe and Armourland, a sleek piece of robo-pop that links social breakdown with the emotional barriers we all put up.".

NME regarded the album as "a leaner, more relatable beast than its predecessor... The self-conscious straining to be regarded as innovators and iconoclasts that occasionally muddled their debut is absent here: this is a record less bothered about surface than it is about feeling... Slowly but surely, they are progressing towards something extraordinary." The review also called attention to the album's themes of technology and human response: "Pop's young futurists have written an album about how terrifying the future is. The intertwined themes of technology and disconnection are prevalent through Arc."

A third single from Arc – "Duet" – was released on 25 March 2013 on 7" vinyl.

"Kemosabe" went on to be nominated as Best Contemporary Song at the 2014 Ivor Novello Awards, and to win UK Single of the Year at the Music Producers Guild Awards.

Pritchard and Robertshaw both provided several instrumental performances for tracks co-produced by Kosten Marina's "Froot" singles and album (released in March 2015).

=== 2015–2016: Get to Heaven ===
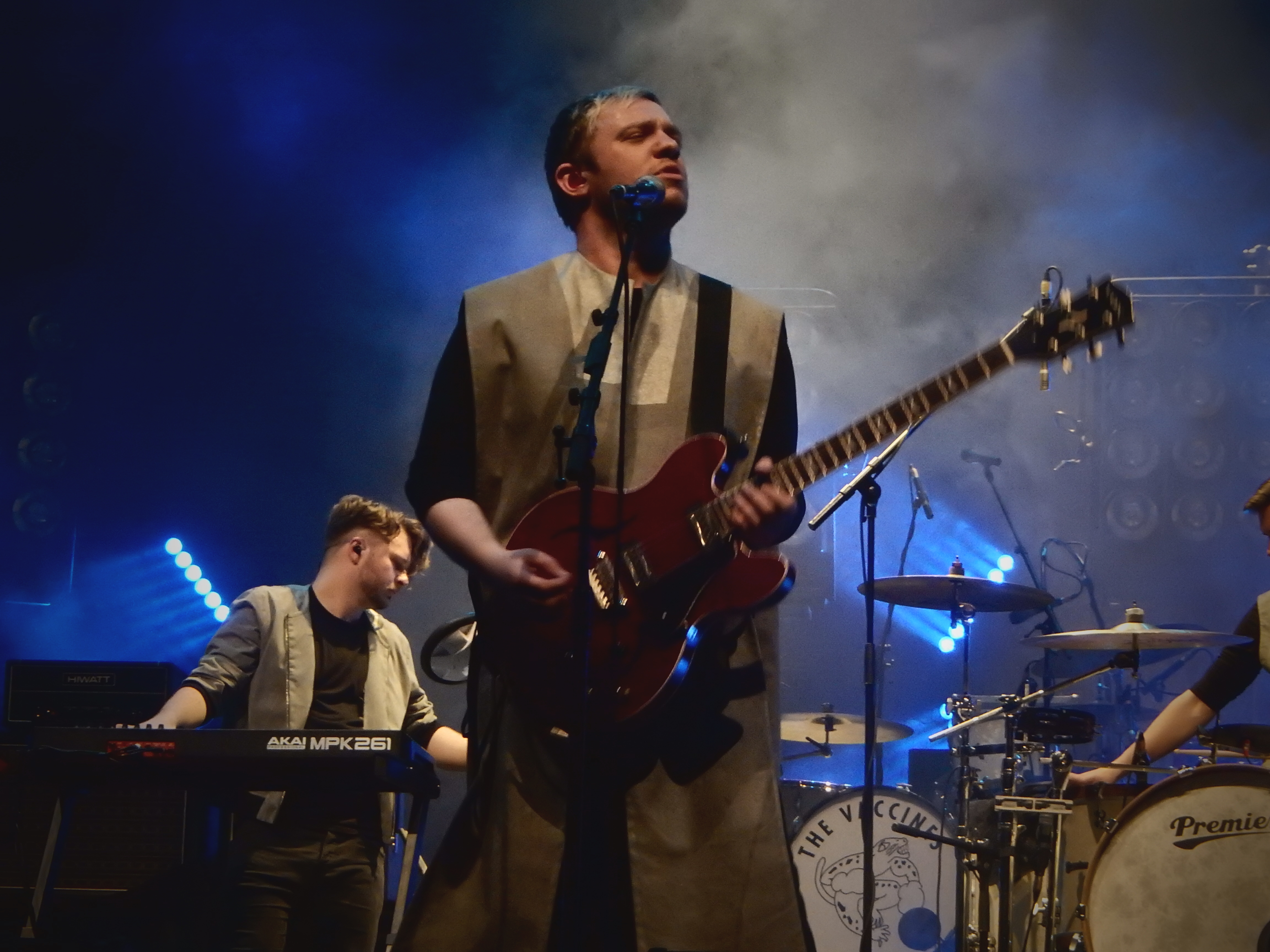
Higgs mid-performance at the Royal Albert Hall in London

On 17 February 2015, the band released the single "Distant Past" with Zane Lowe on BBC Radio 1 naming it the 'Hottest Record in the World'. The band's third studio album, Get to Heaven, was released on 22 June 2015. BBC Entertainment reporter Mark Savage said: "Ebola, missing airplanes, beheadings, the rise of UKIP. They're not the usual topics for a top 40 chart act, but that's exactly what alt-pop band Everything Everything have been writing about over the past year [...] The lyrics were inspired when the Manchester band took a year off from touring, and Higgs started watching rolling news on a loop". Higgs told Savage, "After we'd finished the record, I read the lyrics back and I realised I'd written a horror bible".

The video for the band's single 'Spring / Sun / Winter / Dread' was shared on 31 July 2015. The video sees the band's frontman Jonathan Higgs take over production. He said via a press release, "The song talks about seasons passing and getting older, so we wanted to concentrate on the Sun and make it into a kind of oppressive force – positive and life-giving but also burning and destructive. We used Ultra-Violet and Infra-Red cameras to get a look at the sun damage on our skin, and give everything an alien look. We shot in a quarry so we could have a clear horizon and a dry, hot, desert scene. Most of the sun effects were completed afterwards because we picked a rainy day to shoot, though we did spray everything silver in order to get some good light reflections and add to the heatproof/astronaut feel."

On 2 September 2016, Everything Everything released the single "I Believe It Now" for BT Sport to use for Premier League shows. They also announced they were working on a fourth album, with Higgs commenting that its lyrics would "inevitably" be affected by Brexit.

=== 2017–2019: A Fever Dream and A Deeper Sea ===
On 13 June 2017, Everything Everything announced their fourth album A Fever Dream by releasing the single "Can't Do". The album was later released on 18 August 2017 to strong reviews, with The Guardian declaring "if pop culture continues on its dorky course, it will be only a matter of time before these nerds rule." Marcy Donelson of AllMusic wrote: "A Fever Dream is confrontational, warped, emotionally and aurally high-contrast, and full of turmoil, but reliable in its infectiousness." The album also received commercial success, peaking at number 5 on the UK Albums Chart. Following the success of the album, the band went on tour in spring 2018. Speaking to The Independent, Higgs says "The lyrics are definitely more personal here, [...] You can't always be talking about the bigger things, you sometimes need to talk about what's close to you."

This album saw the band's second Mercury Prize nomination, this time in 2018. They later won Album of the Year (2019) at the Music Producers Guild Awards.

On 27 February 2018, Everything Everything released the EP A Deeper Sea in advance of their upcoming tour. The EP received positive reviews, with The Edge saying "[their] latest four-track EP shows them to be, as ever, finely attuned to the untidy rhythms of modern society." and rating it 4/5 stars. The EP was prompted by Higgs reading "some shocking statistics on male suicide" and going on to write the first track, "The Mariana". The remainder of the EP consists of an unreleased track from A Fever Dream: "Breadwinner", a remix of "Ivory Tower" (from A Fever Dream) by Tom Vek, and a cover of "Don't Let It Bring You Down" by Neil Young that had been recorded in 2017 for Annie Mac's Radio 1 show.

In April 2019 it was announced that Jeremy Pritchard would be joining Foals to play live dates, following the departure of bass player Walter Gervers.

A Deeper Sea was Everything Everything's last release for RCA. Subsequent releases would appear on their own Infinity Industries label via distributors AWAL (Artists Without a Label).

=== 2020–2021: Re-Animator and Supernormal ===
On 23 April 2020, the band released the single "In Birdsong" with a music video directed by Higgs. Their fifth album Re-Animator was announced on 13 May 2020 alongside the single "Arch Enemy", with a music video directed by Higgs later released on 27 May 2020. On 18 June 2020, the band released a third single "Planets", with a music video directed again by Higgs. On 28 July 2020, the band released the fourth single "Violent Sun", again with a music video by Higgs. The music video saw use of the band's damaged instruments from a recent fire that occurred in their studio lockup, with the description reading "We decided to use our destroyed instruments one last time before we threw them out, filming ourselves and each other. Violent Sun is about desperately holding on to the moment before it passes forever." Re-Animator was released on 11 September 2020, alongside the music video for "Big Climb". The album received commercial success by peaking at number 5 on the UK Albums Chart. On 15 December 2020, a music video directed by Kit Monteith and Jonathan Higgs for the track "Black Hyena" was released.

On 10 March 2021, the band released the single "Supernormal". The music video, released on the same day, was directed by Jonathan Higgs, with the song's lyrics being inspired by supernormal stimuli. On 12 June 2021, Everything Everything released the Supernormal EP exclusively on 10" vinyl for Record Store Day 2021. The EP consisted of the previously released single "Supernormal", an unreleased track from Re-Animator, "Mercury & Me", and remixes of Re-Animator tracks "Big Climb" and "Black Hyena" by Jack Bevan of Foals and IOE AIE respectively. A digital release and music video directed by Higgs for the track "Mercury & Me" were later released on 17 June 2021.

=== 2022–present: Raw Data Feel and Mountainhead ===
On 7 February 2022, Everything Everything announced their sixth album, Raw Data Feel, later released on 20 May 2022. Alongside the announcement they released the single "Bad Friday" with a music video directed by Kit Monteith and Jonathan Higgs. The band incorporated text and imagery generated by artificial intelligence for the album's song titles, lyrics and artwork. The band also announced the book Caps Lock On, containing the lyrics to every Everything Everything song to date, due for release the same day. On 9 March 2022, the band released a second single, "Teletype", the album's opener. It was released alongside a music video created by Higgs, consisting of human faces generated by AI singing along to the song. On 28 March 2022, the band released the third single "I Want a Love Like This" alongside a music video directed by Kit Monteith. A fourth single, "Pizza Boy", was released on 4 May 2022 with a video filmed during the band's UK Spring 2022 tour. A music video directed by Krishna Muthurangu for the track "Jennifer" was released on the same day as the album.

The album reached a peak of number 4 in the UK Albums Chart, making it their highest-charting release to date. It was also released to critical praise, with The Line of Best Fit writing "Through a dizzying blend of experimentation, innovation and stylistic idiosyncrasy Everything Everything have created another peerless record with Raw Data Feel, one which proves once more that the horizons the band chases are theirs and theirs alone" and giving the album a 9/10.

On 13 July 2023, Everything Everything announced that in celebration of 13 years since the release of their debut album, Man Alive, a reissue of the original vinyl alongside a new deluxe edition featuring unreleased material, rarities, demos and outtakes would be released on 25 August 2023. "Riot On The Ward", a track from the deluxe edition that was recorded in 2007 was released for streaming on the same day as the announcement.

On 27 October 2023, Everything Everything announced their seventh album, Mountainhead, which was released on 1 March 2024. They also announced a UK tour in March and April 2024, with support from Divorce. The band toured the UK again in November and December 2024, with support from Prima Queen. In an interview with NME, Higgs says that the album was written and produced quickly and was intended to feature no plug-ins or effects, in reaction to Raw Data Feel. The album features an underlying concept which imagines a world in which a society has created a mountain by digging a big hole: "A Mountainhead is a person that believes that the mountain must grow and the pit must get deeper."

In April 2025, the band announced a tour of UK and Ireland venues to celebrate the 10th anniversary of the album "Get to Heaven". In April 2026, they also held an Australian tour celebrating the 10th anniversary same album, supported by Hayden Thorpe, Frontman of the Wild Beasts. An anniversary tour for North American ran from September to October 2026.

== Musical style ==
Everything Everything are noted for an extremely eclectic and dynamic style, with complex song construction and dense, detailed lyrics sung in a rapid-fire, falsetto delivery by Jonathan Higgs. While nominally an alternative rock band with outright pop stylings, the band uses production and rhythmic approaches closer to those of contemporary R&B, glitch pop and electronica (including heavy use of laptop programming and processing) and songwriting approaches similar to those of progressive or psychedelic rock. Critic Paul Lester has compared Everything Everything's sound to "a riot in a melody factory" and compared them to "Timbaland if he cocked an oblique ear to Yes". In the Guardian, Mark Beaumont described the band as "the most intricate, streamlined merging yet of math rock's arch complexities, electronica's 80s obsession and hooks made from mobile phone interference." Whilst Higgs' lyrics often address sociopolitical themes and the impact of late capitalism and technology on modern society, he has stated that he does not want to be defined as a "political" songwriter. He did however note that his lyrical themes tend to be a mixture of "cold technology, modern toxicity, ancient myths and an element of prophecy". Tim Smith of Cardiacs was an early champion of the band.

When asked about their sound in an interview with UK music blog There Goes the Fear in Leeds in October 2010, singer Jonathan Higgs replied, "We think of it as rock primarily. We try not to make it sound like a lot of things you've heard before, not on purpose, but it tends to come out a bit like that. We're not really interested in copying certain genres or anything, so I guess you'd say it's unpredictable and sort of surprising." Higgs has counted Nirvana, Radiohead, the Beatles, Destiny's Child, and Craig David as some of the band's very eclectic stock of influences.

Bassist Jeremy Pritchard has said the band's intention is "to avoid cliche, or the cliches expected of white men with guitars from Manchester" and sums up their sound as "highly stylised and deracinated – we're influenced by everything except 12-bar blues." He's also commented "There are no genres I can think of that we haven’t learnt something from. We all share a huge number of basic passions like Radiohead, but we all come from different areas of popular music: jazz and funk; modern US R'n'B, prog and krautrock, post-rock/punk/hardcore. And we all love good honest pop. We’re a rock band as far as we're concerned." He's noted that the band's lyrics are "almost always layered with several meanings, and play with puns, quotes or alliteration a fair amount, but never just for the sake of it."

In an interview with the Irish Times, drummer Michael Spearman said "It sounds quite cheesy, but stuff like Destiny’s Child has proven just as important as The Beatles and Radiohead. I suppose that love of R'n'B comes through in a way. We don't normally say 'we want this song to sound like this or that', we try to be as organic as possible. It's like with The Beatles – they were trying to play the black music of the day, and by doing so, they sort of changed it, it became a different thing. We thought about... trying to get Timbaland in, or something. But we decided against it, because it's a fine line between filtering that music, or just trying to ape it by going to the source of it... We all love Michael Jackson and stuff like that; dance music in general, or just that sort of syncopated music. That's something that connects all of us."

== Members ==
Current members

- Jonathan Higgs – lead vocals, keyboards, rhythm guitar (2007–present)
- Jeremy Pritchard – bass guitar, keyboards, backing vocals (2007–present)
- Michael Spearman – drums, backing vocals, occasional keyboards (2007–present)
- Alex Robertshaw – lead guitar, keyboards, backing vocals (2009–present)

Former members

- Alex Niven – lead guitar, backing vocals (2007–2009)

Touring musicians

- Peter Sené – keyboards & percussion (2012–2025)
- Jacob Berry – keyboards & percussion (2025–present)

== Discography ==
=== Studio albums ===
List of studio albums, with selected chart positions and certifications shown
Title	Details	Peak chart positions					Sales	Certifications
Title	Details	UK	UK Indie	AUS	IRL	SCO	Sales	Certifications
Man Alive	Released: 27 August 2010; Label: Geffen; Formats: CD, LP, digital download	17	—	—	—	40		BPI: Silver
Arc	Released: 14 January 2013; Label: RCA Victor; Formats: CD, LP, digital download	5	—	70	37	10		BPI: Silver
Get to Heaven	Released: 22 June 2015; Label: RCA Victor; Formats: CD, LP, digital download	7	5	29	45	14		BPI: Silver
A Fever Dream	Released: 18 August 2017; Label: RCA Victor; Formats: CD, LP, cassette, digital download, streaming	5	—	68	39	13	UK: 20,164	
Re-Animator	Released: 11 September 2020; Label: Infinity Industries, AWAL; Formats: CD, LP, cassette, digital download, streaming	5	1	—	99	4		
Raw Data Feel	Released: 20 May 2022; Label: Infinity Industries, AWAL; Formats: CD, LP, cassette, digital download, streaming	4	1	—	—	4		
Mountainhead	Released: 1 March 2024; Label: BMG; Formats: CD, LP, cassette, digital download, streaming	9	3	— (Note: Mountainhead did not enter the Australian Albums Chart but peaked at number 30 on the Australian Physical Albums Chart.)	—	4		
Poison Pop	Releases: 12 March 2027; Label: BMG; Formats: CD, LP, cassette, digital download, streaming	TBA						
"—" denotes album that did not chart or was not released in that territory.

=== Extended plays ===
List of extended plays, with selected details
Title	Details
Schoolin	Released: 7 July 2010; Label: Vinyl Junkie; Formats: CD, digital download
My Kz, Ur Bf	Released: 16 April 2011; Label: Vinyl Junkie; Formats: CD, digital download
Cough Cough	Released: 5 February 2013; Label: Cult; Formats: Digital download
A Deeper Sea	Released: 27 February 2018; Label: Sony RCA; Formats: Digital download, streaming
Supernormal	Released: 12 June 2021; Label: Infinity Industries, AWAL; Formats: 10" vinyl
Get to Heaven (The B-Sides)	Released: 12 April 2025; Label: Music On Vinyl; Formats: 12" vinyl

=== Singles ===
List of singles, with selected peak chart positions
Title	Year	Peak chart positions					Album
Title	Year	UK	AUS Hit.	BEL	MEX	SCO	Album
"Suffragette Suffragette"	2008	—	—	—	×	—	Man Alive
"Photoshop Handsome"	2009	129	—	—	—	—	Man Alive
"My Kz, Ur Bf"	2009	129	—	—	—	—	Man Alive
"Schoolin'"	2010	162	—	—	—	—	Man Alive
"Cough Cough"	2012	37	—	—	40	49	Arc
"Kemosabe"	2013	48	—	—	34	65	Arc
"Duet"	2013	— (Note: "Duet" did not enter the UK Singles Chart, but peaked at number 11 on the UK Physical Chart.)	—	—	—	—	Arc
"Don't Try"	2013	— (Note: "Don't Try" did not enter the UK Singles Chart, but peaked at number 6 on the UK Physical Singles Chart.)	—	—	—	—	Arc
"Distant Past"	2015	88	13	129	—	81	Get to Heaven
"Regret"	2015	119	—	89	—	—	Get to Heaven
"Spring / Sun / Winter / Dread"	2015	— (Note: "Spring / Sun / Winter / Dread" did not enter the UK Singles Chart, but peaked at number 18 on the UK Physical Chart.)	—	—	—	—	Get to Heaven
"No Reptiles"	2015	— (Note: "No Reptiles" did not enter the UK Singles Chart, but peaked at number 28 on the UK Physical Chart.)	—	—	—		Get to Heaven
"I Believe It Now"	2016	—	—	—	—	—	Non-album single
"Can't Do"	2017	—	—	—	44	—	A Fever Dream
"Desire"	2017	—	—	—	—	—	A Fever Dream
"Night of the Long Knives"	2017	—	—	—	—	—	A Fever Dream
"Breadwinner"	2018	—	—	—	—	—	A Deeper Sea
"The Mariana"	2018	—	—	—	—	—	A Deeper Sea
"In Birdsong"	2020	—	—	—	—	—	Re-Animator
"Arch Enemy"	2020	—	—	—	—	—	Re-Animator
"Planets"	2020	—	—	—	—	—	Re-Animator
"Violent Sun"	2020	—	—	—	—	—	Re-Animator
"Supernormal"	2021	— (Note: "Supernormal" did not enter the UK Singles Chart, but peaked at number 69 on the UK Single Sales Chart.)	—	—	—	×	Supernormal
"Mercury & Me"	2021	—	—	—	—	×	Supernormal
"Bad Friday"	2022	—	—	—	—	×	Raw Data Feel
"Teletype"	2022	—	—	—	—	×	Raw Data Feel
"I Want a Love Like This"	2022	—	—	—	—	×	Raw Data Feel
"Pizza Boy"	2022	—	—	—	—	×	Raw Data Feel
"Cold Reactor"	2023	—	—	—	×	×	Mountainhead
"The Mad Stone"	2023	—	—	—	×	×	Mountainhead
"The End of the Contender"	2024	—	—	—	×	×	Mountainhead
"Pressure"	2025	— (Note: "Pressure" did not enter the UK Singles Chart, but peaked at number 99 on the UK Single Sales Chart.)	—	—	×	×	Get to Heaven (The B-Sides)
"Poison Pop"	2026	—	—	—	×	×	Poison Pop
"—" denotes a single that did not chart or was not released in that territory. "×" denotes periods where charts did not exist or were not archived.

==== Photoshop Handsome ====
Photoshop Handsome

"Photoshop Handsome" is a song by the band. The track was released in the UK on 25 May 2009 as the second single from Man Alive (2010). The song's title refers to the digital editing software Adobe Photoshop and how it has been utilized in the cosmetics industry to alter people's images as a marketing ploy for their products. According to frontman Jonathan Higgs, "Photoshop Handsome looks at the world of digital image manipulation and computer game re-incarnation. What would it feel like to come back to life as one of the 'perfected', false, immortal beings that adorn magazine covers, adverts and games?". It was released 16 January 2011.

For the chart week dated 29 January 2011, "Photoshop Handsome" debuted at number one hundred and twenty-nine on the UK Singles Chart—marking the band's third appearance on the chart; following "Schoolin'" (number 152, 2010) and "My Kz, Ur Bf" (number 121, 2010).

Digital EP
No.	Title	Length
1.	"Photoshop Handsome"	3:20
2.	"Photoshop Handsome" (acoustic)	3:24
3.	"Photoshop Handsome" (Mystery Jets 'KyotoShop Handsome' remix)	4:30

Remixes EP
No.	Title	Length
1.	"Photoshop Handsome" (Soil in the Synth remix)	4:59
2.	"Photoshop Handsome" (II Figures remix)	3:40
3.	"Photoshop Handsome" (Disclosure remix)	4:30

== Music videos ==
List of music videos
Title	Year	Director
"Suffragette Suffragette"	2008	Jonathan Higgs
"Photoshop Handsome"	2009	Jonathan Higgs
"My Kz, Ur Bf"	2009	Jonathan Higgs
"Schoolin'"	2010	Nicos Livesey
"My Kz, Ur Bf" (version two)	2010	One in Three
"Photoshop Handsome" (version two)	2010	Jonathan Higgs
"Final Form"	2011	Jonathan Higgs
"Cough Cough"	2012	Jonathan Higgs
"Kemosabe"	2012	Jonathan Higgs
"Duet"	2013	Jonathan Higgs
"Don't Try"	2013	Jonathan Higgs
"Distant Past"	2015	Jonathan Higgs
"Regret"	2015	Jonathan Higgs
"Spring / Sun / Winter / Dread"	2015	Jonathan Higgs
"No Reptiles"	2015	Jonathan Higgs
"Can't Do"	2017	Holly Blakey
"Desire"	2017	Dave Tree
"Night of the Long Knives"	2017	Kit Monteith
"Breadwinner"	2018	Jonathan Higgs
"The Mariana"	2018	Jonathan Higgs
"In Birdsong"	2020	Jonathan Higgs
"Arch Enemy"	2020	Jonathan Higgs
"Planets"	2020	Jonathan Higgs
"Violent Sun"	2020	Jonathan Higgs
"Big Climb"	2020	Jonathan Higgs
"Black Hyena"	2020	Jonathan Higgs and Kit Monteith
"Supernormal"	2021	Jonathan Higgs
"Mercury & Me"	2021	Jonathan Higgs
"Bad Friday"	2022	Jonathan Higgs and Kit Monteith
"Teletype"	2022	Jonathan Higgs
"I Want a Love Like This"	2022	Kit Monteith
"Pizza Boy"	2022	Jonathan Higgs
"Jennifer"	2022	Krishna Muthurangu
"Cold Reactor"	2023	Kit Monteith
"The End of the Contender"	2024	Kit Monteith
"Enter the Mirror"	2024	Jonathan Higgs and Kit Monteith
"Your Money, My Summer"	2024	Nicholas O’ Donnell
"Canary"	2024	Kit Monteith

== Awards and nominations ==
Awards and nominations for Everything Everything
Year	Organisation	Award	Work	Result
2009	BBC	Sound of 2010	—N/a	Nominated
2011	The Times	Breakthrough Award	—N/a	Won
2011	XFM	New Music Award	—N/a	Shortlisted
2011	NME	Best New Band	—N/a	Nominated
2011	Ivor Novello Awards	Best Album	Man Alive	Nominated
2011	Ivor Novello Awards	Best Song Musically and Lyrically	"My Kz, Ur Bf"	Nominated
2011	Saatchi & Saatchi New Director's Showcase	Best New Video Director	Jonathan Higgs	Nominated
2011	British Phonographic Industry	Mercury Prize	Man Alive	Nominated
2011	Q Awards	Best New Act	—N/a	Nominated
2012	NME	50 Best Tracks of 2012	"Cough Cough"	No. 30
2014	Music Producers Guild Awards	UK Single of the Year	"Kemosabe"	Won
2014	Ivor Novello Awards	Best Contemporary Song	"Kemosabe"	Nominated
2015	Q Awards	Best Album	Get to Heaven	Nominated
2018	Ivor Novello Awards	Best Album	A Fever Dream	Nominated
2018	Ivor Novello Awards	Best Song Musically and Lyrically	"Can't Do"	Nominated
2018	British Phonographic Industry	Mercury Prize	A Fever Dream	Nominated
2019	Music Producers Guild Awards	Album of the Year	A Fever Dream	Won
