= List of awards and nominations received by Plan B =

Plan B awards and nominations
Awards and nominations
Award	Wins	Nominations
Brit	1	2
Ivor Novello	3	0
MOBO	3	7
Q	3	2
UK Music Video Awards	6	11

Totals (Note: Certain award groups do not simply award one winner. They acknowledge several different recipients, have runners-up, and have third place. Since this is a specific recognition and is different from losing an award, runner-up mentions are considered wins in this award tally. For simplification and to avoid errors, each award in this list has been presumed to have had a prior nomination.)
- Wins: 24
- Nominations: 42

List of awards and nominations received by Plan B.

== ASCAP Awards ==
Year	Nominee / work	Award	Result
2011	Plan B	Vanguard Award	Won

== BET Hip Hop Awards ==
The BET Hip Hop Awards are an annual awards show, airing on BET, showcasing hip hop performers, producers and music video directors. Plan B has received one nomination for Best UK Artist in 2006.

Year	Nominee / work	Award	Result
2006	Plan B	Best UK Artist	Nominated

== BRIT Awards ==
Year	Nominee / work	Award	Result
2011	Plan B	British Male Solo Artist	Won
2011	The Defamation of Strickland Banks	British Album	Nominated
2011	"She Said"	British Single	Nominated
2013	Plan B	Best Male Solo Artist	Nominated
2013	Ill Manors	MasterCard British Album of the Year	Nominated

== British Independent Film Awards ==
Year	Nominee / work	Award	Result
2012	Ben Drew	The Douglas Hickox Award (Directorial Debut)	Nominated
2012	Ill Manors	Best Achievement in Production	Nominated

== Berlin Music Video Awards ==
Year	Nominee / work	Award	Result
2019	WAIT SO LONG	Best Editor	Nominated

== BT Digital Music Awards ==
Plan B has received two nominations for Best Male Artist and Best Song for "She Said" in 2010.

Year	Nominee / work	Award	Result
2010	Plan B	Best Male Artist	Nominated
2010	"She Said"	Best Song	Nominated
2011	Plan B	Best Male Artist	Nominated

== Ivor Novello Awards ==
Year	Nominee / work	Award	Result
2011	Ben Drew	Songwriter of the Year	Won
2011	The Defamation of Strickland Banks	Album Award	Won
2011	"She Said"	Most Performed Work	Won

== Mercury Prize ==
Year	Nominee / work	Award	Result
2012	Ill Manors	Album of the Year	Nominated

== MOBO Awards ==
The MOBO Awards was established in 1996 by Kanya King and Andy Ruffell to recognise and celebrate artists of any race or nationality performing black music. Plan B was nominated for Best UK Male in 2006, Best UK Act and Best Album for The Defamation of Strickland Banlks in 2010 and won Best UK R&B/Soul in 2010.

Year	Nominee / work	Award	Result
2006	Plan B	Best Newcomer	Nominated
2006	Plan B	Best UK Male	Nominated
2010	Plan B	Best UK Act	Nominated
2010	Plan B	Best UK R&B/Soul Act	Won
2010	The Defamation of Strickland Banks	Best Album	Nominated
2012	Plan B	Best UK Male	Won
2012	Plan B	Best UK Hip Hop/Grime Act	Won
2012	Ill Manors	Best Album	Nominated
2012	"Ill Manors"	Best Song	Nominated
2012	"Ill Manors"	Best Video	Nominated

== MTV Europe Music Awards ==
The MTV Europe Music Awards (EMAs) were established in 1994 by MTV Networks Europe to celebrate the most popular music videos in Europe. Plan B was nominated twice in 2010 for Best New Act and Best Video for "Prayin'".

Year	Nominee / work	Award	Result
2010	Plan B	Best New Act	Nominated
2010	"Prayin'"	Best Video	Nominated

== The Music Producers Guild Awards ==
The Music Producers Guild Awards are presented annually by the Music Producers Guild.

Year	Nominee / work	Award	Result
2011	"She Said"	UK Single of the Year 2010	Won

== NME Awards ==
Year	Nominee / work	Award	Result
2011	"Stay Too Long"	Best Dancefloor Filler	Nominated

== NRJ Music Awards ==
The NRJ Music Awards, created in 2000 by the radio station NRJ in partnership with the television network TF1 takes place every year in mid-January at Cannes (PACA, France) as the opening of MIDEM (Marché international de l'édition musicale). Plan B was nominated twice in 2011 for International Revelation of the Year and Hit of the Year for "She Said".

Year	Nominee / work	Award	Result
2011	Plan B	International Revelation of the Year	Nominated
2011	"She Said"	Hit of the Year	Nominated

== Q Awards ==
The Q Awards are the UK's annual music awards run by the music magazine Q. Plan B won the award for Breakthrough Artist in 2010, as well as being nominated for Best Male Artist, Best Album for The Defamation of Strickland Banks and Best Video for "End Credits" with Chase & Status. In 2012, "Ill Manors" won the award for Best Track.

Year	Nominee / work	Award	Result
2010	Plan B	Best Male Artist	Nominated
2010	Plan B	Breakthrough Artist	Won
2010	The Defamation of Strickland Banks	Best Album	Nominated
2010	"End Credits" (with Chase & Status)	Best Video	Won
2012	"Ill Manors"	Best Track	Won

== Radio 1's Teen Awards ==
Year	Nominee / work	Award	Result
2010	The Defamation of Strickland Banks	Best Album	Won

== South Bank Sky Arts Awards ==
Year	Nominee / work	Award	Result
2011	The Defamation of Strickland Banks	Pop Music	Won

== UK Festival Awards ==
The UK Festival Awards are awarded annually, with various categories for all aspects of festivals that have taken place in the UK, and one category for European festivals. Plan B was nominated for Best Breakthrough Artist in 2010.

Year	Nominee / work	Award	Result
2010	Plan B	Best Breakthrough Artist	Nominated

== UK Music Video Awards ==
The UK Music Video Awards is a British yearly award ceremony, which has taken place in October in London since 2008. Plan B's music videos received a total of eleven nominations in 2010, winning four awards for Best Art Direction in a Video and Best Pop Video for "Prayin" and Best Cinematography in a Video and Best Styling in a Video for "Stay Too Long".

Year	Nominee / work	Award	Result
2010	"Prayin'"	Best Art Direction in a Video	Won
2010	"Prayin'"	Best Cinematography in a Video	Nominated
2010	"Prayin'"	Best Editing in a Video	Nominated
2010	"Prayin'"	Best Pop Video	Won
2010	"Prayin'"	Best Styling in a Video	Nominated
2010	"She Said"	Best Pop Video	Nominated
2010	"Stay Too Long"	Best Cinematography in a Video	Won
2010	"Stay Too Long"	Best Editing in a Video	Nominated
2010	"Stay Too Long"	Best Styling in a Video	Won
2010	"Stay Too Long"	Best Telecine in a Video	Nominated
2010	"Stay Too Long"	Best Urban Video	Nominated
2011	The Defamation of Strickland Banks	Best Music Ad	Nominated
2011	"Love Goes Down"	Best Telecine in a Video	Won
2011	"The Recluse"	Best Art Direction in a Video	Nominated
2011	"The Recluse"	Best Telecine in a Video	Nominated
2012	"Ill Manors"	Best Urban Video	Won
2012	"Ill Manors"	Best Editing in a Video	Nominated

== Urban Music Awards ==
The Urban Music Awards is a hip hop, R&B, dance and soul music awards ceremony launched in 2003 and now held in six countries annually. Plan B received one nomination for Best Album for The Defamation of Strickland Banks.

Year	Nominee / work	Award	Result
2010	The Defamation of Strickland Banks	Best Album	Nominated
2012	Plan B	Best Hip Hop Act	Nominated
2012	Ill Manors	Best Album	Nominated

== Virgin Media Music Awards ==
Plan B received won the award for Best Solo Male and received a Best Album nomination for The Defamation of Strickland Banks in 2011.

Year	Nominee / work	Award	Result
2011	Plan B	Best Solo Male	Won
2011	The Defamation of Strickland Banks	Best Album	Nominated

== Other awards ==
- BBC Sound of 2006 – 4th place (2006)
- Screen International Stars of Tomorrow (2009)
- Festival du Film Britannique de Dinard – Best Photography award for Ill Manors (2012)
- Festival du Film Britannique de Dinard – Heartbeat Award for Ill Manors (2012)
- Artist and Manager Awards – Artist of the Year (2012)
