= Mountainhead (album) =

Studio album by Everything Everything
- Released: 1 March 2024
- Recorded: 2022–2023
- Studios: Eve Studios (Bredbury, England); Decoy Studios (Woodbridge, England)
- Genres: Synth-pop, Indie pop
- Length: 54:53
- Label: BMG
- Producers: Tom A.D. Fuller; Alex Robertshaw

Everything Everything chronology
Raw Data Feel (2022)	Mountainhead (2024)	Poison Pop (2027)

Singles from Mountainhead
- 1. "Cold Reactor" Released: 26 October 2023; 2. "The Mad Stone" Released: 17 November 2023; 3. "The End of the Contender" Released: 2 February 2024; 4. "Canary" Released: 22 October 2024

Professional ratings
Aggregate scores
Source	Rating
Metacritic	82/100
Review scores
Source	Rating
Clash	7/10
DIY	4/5 stars
The Line of Best Fit	8/10
MusicOMH	4/5 stars
Record Collector	5/5 stars
Under the Radar	8.5/10

Mountainhead is the seventh studio album by British band Everything Everything. It was released on 1 March 2024 through BMG.

== Background and theme ==
Their third release in the span of two years, following Raw Data Feel in 2022 and a reissue of their debut album, Man Alive, in 2023, Everything Everything announced Mountainhead on 26 October 2023. The band wrote, recorded and produced the project in Stockport with the help of guitarist Alex Robertshaw. As opposed to their previous album which made use of artificial intelligence to create content, Mountainhead entirely avoids "plug-ins and effects". The "synthetic pop album" explores "notions of capitalism and social fracturing" from a futuristic point of view.

Lead vocalist Jonathan Higgs explained that the album revolves around a simple concept, taking place in a fictional world "wherein all of society is consumed with the building of a giant mountain". However, the twist in the story is that the people would have to dig a deep hole and live in it in order to build the mountain. Furthermore, at the bottom of the pit lives a giant golden snake that they have to escape. It represents an "alternate society" where those at the bottom have to work relentlessly to keep the elite "elevated". According to Higgs, the goal was to create "an easy but strong metaphor" that can apply to multiple things. To him, a "mountainhead" signifies an individual that believes in continuous growth of a mountain "no matter the cost, and no matter how terrible it is to dwell in the great pit".

== Promotion ==
In promotion of the album, the band embarked UK tour in March and April 2024, with festival appearances throughout the summer.

== Track listing ==
All tracks are written by Jonathan Higgs, Jeremy Pritchard, Alexander Robertshaw, and Michael Spearman.

Mountainhead track listing
No.	Title	Length
1.	"Wild Guess"	4:02
2.	"The End of the Contender"	3:26
3.	"Cold Reactor"	3:51
4.	"Buddy, Come Over"	4:05
5.	"R U Happy?"	3:29
6.	"The Mad Stone"	3:45
7.	"TV Dog"	2:10
8.	"Canary"	4:23
9.	"Don't Ask Me to Beg"	4:14
10.	"Enter the Mirror"	3:42
11.	"Your Money, My Summer"	3:15
12.	"Dagger's Edge"	3:43
13.	"City Song"	5:53
14.	"The Witness"	4:55
Total length:		54:53

Mountainhead (Deluxe) Exclusive Digital
No.	Title	Length
15.	"Stay With Me"	3:28
Total length:		58:21

== Personnel ==
Everything Everything

- Jonathan Higgs – lead vocals (all tracks), backing vocals (tracks 1–3, 5, 8–14), programming (3, 5, 8, 9)
- Jeremy Pritchard – bass (tracks 1–6, 8–14); baritone vocals, piano (2); backing vocals (4, 6, 11, 13, 14)
- Michael Spearman – drums (tracks 1–6, 8–14), percussion (2–6, 8–14), backing vocals (13)
- Alex Robertshaw – production (all tracks); keyboards, synthesizer (tracks 1–6, 8–14); programming (2–6, 9), e-bow guitar (2), backing vocals (3, 6, 11), strings programming (7)

Additional contributors

- Tom A.D. Fuller – production, engineering (all tracks); tambourine (tracks 1, 13, 14)
- Frank Arkwright – mastering
- Cenzo Townshend – mixing
- Martin King – engineering

== Charts ==
Chart performance for Mountainhead
Chart (2024)	Peak position
Australian Physical Albums (ARIA)	30
Scottish Albums (Official Charts)	4
UK Albums (Official Charts)	9
UK Independent Albums (Official Charts)	3
