= Schoolin' =

Single by Everything Everything

from the album Man Alive
- Released: 13 June 2010
- Recorded: 2010
- Genre: Art rock, indie pop, indie rock
- Length: 4:39
- Label: Geffen
- Songwriters: Jonathan Higgs: Jeremy Pritchard; Michael Spearman; Alex Robertshaw
- Producer: David Kosten

Everything Everything singles chronology
"MY KZ, UR BF" (2009)	"Schoolin'" (2010)	"Cough Cough" (2012)

"Schoolin'" is a song from British indie pop band Everything Everything. The track was released in the United Kingdom on 13 June 2010 as the fourth single from the band's debut studio album, Man Alive (2010).

The song came with an animated music video, animated by Nicos Livesey.

== Track listing ==
Digital EP
No.	Title	Length
1.	"Schoolin'"	4:39
2.	"Schoolin'" (Vision of Trees Remix)	4:05
3.	"Schoolin'" (Leo Zero Remix)	6:40
4.	"Schoolin'" (Dead Boy Remix)	5:20

Japanese EP
No.	Title	Length
1.	"Schoolin'"	4:39
2.	"Making Some New Sense"	4:29
3.	"DNA Dump!"	3:06
4.	"Luddites and Lambs"	3:50
5.	"Riot on the Ward"	3:32
6.	"Schoolin'" (Vision of Trees Remix)	4:05

== Charts ==
For the chart week dated 26 June 2010, "Schoolin'" debuted at number one hundred and fifty-two on the UK Singles Chart—marking the band's first appearance on the chart.

=== Weekly charts ===
Chart (2010)	Peak position
UK Singles(Official Charts Company)	152

== Release history ==
Region	Date	Format
United Kingdom	13 June 2010	Digital EP
