= Kemosabe (song) =

Single by Everything Everything

from the album Arc
- Released: 14 January 2013
- Recorded: 2012
- Genre: Art rock, indie pop, indie rock, contemporary R&B
- Length: 3:43
- Label: RCA Victor
- Songwriter(s): Jonathan Higgs
- Producer(s): David Kosten; Everything Everything

Everything Everything singles chronology
| "Cough Cough" (2012) | "Kemosabe" (2013) | "Duet" (2013) |

Music video
- "Kemosabe" on YouTube "Kemosabe" (Audio) on YouTube

"Kemosabe" is a song by British indie pop band Everything Everything. The track was released in the United Kingdom on 14 January 2013 as the second single from the band's second studio album, Arc (2013). The track received its first play on 8 November 2012, having been selected as BBC Radio 1 DJ Zane Lowe's Hottest Record in the World.

== Track listing ==
Digital download
| No. | Title | Length |
|---|---|---|
| 1. | "Kemosabe" | 3:43 |

Vinyl
| No. | Title | Length |
|---|---|---|
| 1. | "Kemosabe" | 3:43 |
| 2. | "Treasure Set" | 3:26 |

== Charts ==
=== Chart performance ===
For the chart week dated 26 January 2013, "Kemosabe" debuted at number forty-eight on the UK Singles Chart—marking the band's second top one hundred entry after "Cough Cough" (#37, 2012).

| Chart (2013) | Peak position |
|---|---|
| UK Singles (The Official Charts Company) | 48 |

== Composition ==
"Kemosabe" plays at 87 beats per minute with a time signature in common time, and is notable for its multiple key changes, falsetto vocals, and syncopated rhythms. A staccato synth pattern is also prevalent throughout the song. Jonathan Higgs' vocal range spans from B♭3 to C#5, and is accompanied by backing vocals.

In an interview, band members described the song as being similar to those on their debut album, Man Alive. Higgs also spoke about the meaning of the song, noting,

"It’s about turbulent relationships and feeling alone even if you are with somebody. It’s playing off the Lone Ranger and his relationship with Tonto. The fact that he’s the Lone Ranger despite – well, he’s always been with Tonto. I always thought that was funny and a bit weird. And I liked the language: Yippeekayay and Hiyo Silver and Kemosabe."

In other interviews, Higgs has expressed discomfort when asked about the song's meaning.

== Credits and personnel ==
Recording and mixing

- Recorded at RAK Studios, London; Angelic Studios, Halse; Muttley Ranch, London; Jonathan's Flat, Manchester; The Garden, London; Crotch Int. Studios, Gilsland mixed at Muttley Ranch, London.

Personnel

- Songwriting - Jonathan Higgs
- Production - David Kosten, Everything Everything
- Recording - Mo Hauseler, Tom A.D. Fuller, David Kosten
- Assistant Engineering - Mike Horner, Pete Prokopiw
- Mixing - David Kosten
- Mastering - John Davis (at Metropolis Mastering)
- Instrumenting - Jonathan Higgs, Jeremy Pritchard, Alex Robertshaw, Michael Spearman

Credits adapted from the liner notes of Arc, RCA Records, UMP.

== Release history ==
| Region | Date | Format |
|---|---|---|
| United Kingdom | 8 November 2012 | Radio airplay |
| United Kingdom | 14 January 2013 | Vinyl |
| United Kingdom | 14 January 2013 | Digital download |
