= Don't Try =

Don't Try may refer to:

- Don't Try (Built to Spill song)
- Don't Try (Everything Everything song)
- "Don't Try", a song by Joyce Manor from 40 oz. to Fresno (2022)
- "Don't Try", a song by Gerard Way (2016)
- "Mat Aazma Re" (lit. 'Please Don't Try'), a song by KK and Pritam from the 2013 Indian film Murder 3
