= Queen Elizabeth High School, Hexham =

Queen Elizabeth High School
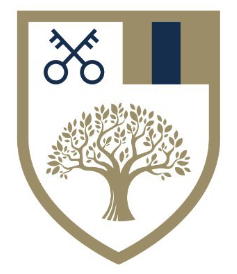

Location
- Whetstone Bridge Road; Hexham, Northumberland, NE46 3JB; England; 54°58′12″N 2°07′04″W

Information
- Type: Academy
- Motto: Respect. Engage. Aspire.
- Established: 1599; 427 years ago
- Founder: Thomas Stackhouse
- Local authority: Northumberland
- Trust: Hadrian Learning Trust
- Department for Education URN: 143291 Tables
- Ofsted: Reports
- Executive Headteacher: Graeme Atkins
- Head of School: Neil Seaton
- Staff: 136
- Gender: Coeducational
- Age: 13 to 18
- Enrolment: 1290
- Colours: Blue, gold and green. (Formally black)
- Rowing club: Queen Elizabeth High School Rowing Club
- Website: http://www.qehs.net

Queen Elizabeth High School (QEHS) is a coeducational high school and sixth form located in Hexham, Northumberland, England.

== History ==
The school was founded in 1599. Thomas Stackhouse, afterwards an Anglican clergyman and theologian, was headmaster of the school from 1701 to 1704. The school is in a multi-academy trust (Hadrian Learning Trust) with Hexham Middle School. The head of school is Neal Seaton, and Graeme Atkins is the Executive Headteacher, having previously headed Northwood School. The school currently uses one building, split into 4 sections; Causey, Leazes, Fellside and The Hydro.

The school received a £36 million investment from the government and Northumberland County Council to expand the "Hydro" building, while demolishing the old 'lower school' and adding state of the art facilities. The new building also incorporates Hexham Middle School, although the students do not mix. During this time, the school rebranded to a new design.

The work was completed in September 2021, after a short delay.

== Admissions ==
It has approximately 1300 students, of whom 380 are in the Sixth Form. Northumberland LEA currently operates a three-tier system, so QEHS has students aged between 13 and 18.

As of 2016 its catchment area is about 6 miles (9.7 km) from west to east and 15 miles (24 km) from north to south. It includes Hexham, Blanchland, Humshaugh, and Riding Mill.

The school is part of the Tynedale Virtual College, a collaboration between the four high schools in the Tyne Valley and Northumberland College. The TVC seeks to provide vocational learning across the area.

It is just off Allendale Road (B6305) in the west of Hexham.

== Academic performance ==
On 21 March 2019 an Ofsted inspection judged the school to be 'Good'.

== Sport ==
The school has a rowing club called the Queen Elizabeth High School Rowing Club,

== Notable former pupils ==
- Joe Grey, footballer
- Jonathan Higgs, member of Everything Everything
- Caroline Humfress, legal historian and academic
- Charlie Mackesy, Artist
- Joe Morris, politician
- Alex Niven, writer, academic and former member of Everything Everything
- Michael Spearman, member of Everything Everything
- Shaun Vipond, footballer
- Matthew Wells, British Olympic Rower
