= Cough Cough =

2012 song by Everything Everything

Single by Everything Everything

from the album Arc
- Released: 14 October 2012
- Recorded: 2012
- Genre: Art rock, indie pop, indie rock, baile funk
- Length: 3:42
- Label: RCA Victor
- Songwriter(s): Jonathan Higgs
- Producer(s): David Kosten, Everything Everything

Everything Everything singles chronology
"Schoolin'" (2010)	"Cough Cough" (2012)	"Kemosabe" (2013)

"Cough Cough" is a song from British indie pop band Everything Everything. The track was released in the United Kingdom on 14 October 2012 as the lead single from the band's second studio album, Arc (2013).

== Reception ==
=== Critical reception ===
Tom Howard of NME praised the track, commenting "Yeah… so… um… wait a second go Everything Everything like the shy and polite young chaps they are. But then they break into a Dirty-Projectors-crossed with-Destiny’s-Child thing that makes you wish they'd go on a two-year hiatus and make comebacks all the bloody time. Suddenly they sound like saviours of music". "Cough Cough" was also met with positive reception from Doron Davidson-Vidavski of Londonist, who noted it as a "manic and wonderful track [which] highlights all that is unique about the quartet: choppy song structures, hectic vocals and hooksome melodies." The song reached #100 on Triple J Hottest 100 of 2012.

=== Chart performance ===
For the chart week dated 27 October 2012, "Cough Cough" debuted at number thirty-seven on the UK Singles Chart—marking the band's first top forty entry—beating previous highest-charting single "My Kz, Ur Bf" (#121, 2010). The following week, "Cough Cough" fell twenty-two places to number fifty-nine; marking its second and final week within the top one hundred.

== Track listing ==
Remixes EP
No.	Title	Length
1.	"Cough Cough"	3:37
2.	"Cough Cough" (Xaphoon Jones Remix)	3:49
3.	"Cough Cough" (Brometer Remix)	4:31
4.	"Cough Cough" (NZCA Lines Remix)	3:12

7" Vinyl
No.	Title	Length
1.	"Cough Cough"	3:37
2.	"A.D."	4:10

== Charts ==
Chart (2012)	Peak position
UK Singles (OCC)	37

== Credits and personnel ==
Recording and mixing

- Recorded at RAK Studios, London; Angelic Studios, Halse; Muttley Ranch, London; Jonathan's Flat, Manchester; mixed at Muttley Ranch, London.

Personnel

- Songwriting - Jonathan Higgs
- Production - David Kosten, Everything Everything
- Recording - Mo Hauseler, Tom A.D. Fuller, David Kosten
- Assistant Engineering - Mike Horner, Pete Prokopiw
- Mixing - David Kosten
- Mastering - John Davis (at Metropolis Mastering)
- Instrumenting - Jonathan Higgs, Jeremy Pritchard, Alex Robertshaw, Michael Spearman
- Coughing - Mike Carswell, David Kosten

Credits adapted from the liner notes of Arc, RCA Records, UMP.

== Release history ==
Region	Date	Format
United Kingdom	29 August 2012	Radio airplay
United Kingdom	14 October 2012	Digital download
