= My Kz, Ur Bf =

Single by Everything Everything

from the album Man Alive
- Released: 5 October 2009
- Recorded: 2008
- Length: 3:37
- Label: Geffen
- Songwriters: Jonathan Higgs; Jeremy Pritchard; Michael Spearman; Alex Niven
- Producer: David Kosten

Everything Everything singles chronology
"Photoshop Handsome" (2009)	"My Kz, Ur Bf" (2009)	"Schoolin'" (2010)

"My Kz, Ur Bf" (often stylised as "MY KZ, UR BF"; an abbreviation of "My Keys, Your Boyfriend") is a song from British indie pop band Everything Everything. The track was released in the United Kingdom on 5 October 2009 as the third single from the band's debut studio album, Man Alive (2010).

== Background and composition ==
The song began as what Jonathan Higgs has described as "an old demo I made in a sort of R&B pastiche style". The band released this demo, under the title "Airstrike on Your Forehead", on their official SoundCloud page, explaining how the song had been altered and stripped down since the demo version.

"My Kz, Ur Bf" is characterised by its usage of numerous synthesizers, complex syncopated rhythms, fast-paced vocals, and rich backing vocals. In a self-released video on the band's YouTube channel, Higgs describes the song's exploration of "two different types of America", referring to the stark contrast between the "superficial sitcom world" and "killing people in foreign lands". The song imagines a superimposition of the two environments, and how insignificant one would seem in the presence of the other.

The band filmed the video for the original 2009 version inside Hack Green Secret Nuclear Bunker in Cheshire.

== Track listing ==
Digital EP
No.	Title	Length
1.	"My Kz, Ur Bf"	3:37
2.	"My Kz, Ur Bf" (Grum Remix)	5:51

== Charts ==
For the chart week dated 4 September 2010, "My Kz, Ur Bf" debuted as number 121 on the UK Singles Chart—marking the band's second appearance on the chart, following "Schoolin'" (number 152, 2010).

Chart performance for "My Kz, Ur Bf"
Chart (2010)	Peak position
UK Singles (Official Charts Company)	121

== Release history ==
Release history for "My Kz, Ur Bf"
Region	Date	Format
United Kingdom	13 June 2010	Digital download
