= Arc (Everything Everything album) =

Studio album by Everything Everything
- Released: 14 January 2013
- Recorded: 2011–2012
- Studios: RAK Studios (London); Angelic Studio (Brackley); Crotch International (Gilsland); Muttley Ranch (London); The Garden (London); Blueprint Studios (Manchester); Jonathan Higgs's flat (Manchester)
- Genres: Art rock; indie rock
- Length: 48:05
- Label: RCA Victor
- Producer: David Kosten

Everything Everything chronology
| Man Alive (2010) | Arc (2013) | Get to Heaven (2015) |

Singles from Arc
- 1. "Cough Cough" Released: 14 October 2012; 2. "Kemosabe" Released: 14 January 2013; 3. "Duet" Released: 24 March 2013; 4. "Don't Try" Released: 16 June 2013

Arc is the second studio album by British indie rock band Everything Everything, released on 14 January 2013 through RCA Victor. Produced by David Kosten, who had previously worked with the band on their debut album, Man Alive (2010), it was preceded by the singles "Cough Cough" and "Kemosabe", with "Duet" and "Don't Try" released as singles later in 2013.

Seeking a more focused and accessible sound than on Man Alive, Everything Everything adopted a more collaborative approach to songwriting, emphasising stronger melodies, more conventional song structures and less densely layered arrangements. Arc combines art rock and indie pop with elements of electronic music, contemporary R&B and orchestral arrangements, while retaining the band's characteristic rhythmic complexity and Jonathan Higgs's distinctive vocal style. Its lyrics explore themes including consumerism, environmental degradation, technological development, social alienation, and depression.

Arc received generally favourable reviews from music critics, who praised its inventive arrangements, more direct songwriting and emotional depth, although some questioned its stylistic consistency. The album received a weighted average score of 79 out of 100 on Metacritic. It debuted at number five on the UK Albums Chart, becoming Everything Everything's first top-ten album.

== Background and recording ==
Following the release of their debut studio album, Man Alive (2010), Everything Everything sought to develop a more focused and accessible approach to songwriting for its follow-up, Arc. Although the band had attracted an audience with the complex arrangements and unconventional structures of their debut, they believed that these qualities sometimes prevented listeners from connecting with the songs emotionally. Vocalist Jonathan Higgs and bassist Jeremy Pritchard felt that repeating the approach of Man Alive would limit their artistic development and appeal to new listeners. Drummer Michael Spearman explained that the band wanted to emphasise stronger melodies and more direct song structures while retaining their distinctive musical identity.

The writing process was more collaborative than that of Man Alive. Higgs generally developed initial musical ideas on guitar or piano before transferring them to a computer, where the other members helped expand, arrange and restructure them. Rather than retaining complete demos, as they had sometimes done for their debut, the band repeatedly revised compositions, removing unnecessary elements and reworking individual sections. Spearman attributed the improved collaboration partly to the members' greater familiarity with guitarist Alex Robertshaw, who had joined during the recording of Man Alive. The musicians had become more comfortable criticising one another's contributions, allowing them to refine songs more extensively.

Recording began in January 2012, with the album completed by July of that year. The sessions took place at several locations, including Angelic Studio in Northamptonshire, where engineer Tom Fuller worked on the album. Additional recording was undertaken at Miloco Studios' facilities, including The Square, The Yard and The Pool. The band also used the studio belonging to Elbow in a former mill in Salford for writing, arranging and preliminary recordings. Higgs said that the building's spacious acoustics encouraged less cluttered arrangements, while allowing the musicians to develop material together through live performance.

Arc was produced by David Kosten, who had also worked on Man Alive. Although the band considered other producers, they ultimately retained Kosten because of his familiarity with their working methods and interpersonal dynamics. Higgs later said that the group had become more receptive to Kosten's suggestions, particularly his interest in developing stronger songs for radio, whereas they had resisted some of these ideas during the production of their debut. Pritchard described the resulting collaboration as a more constructive relationship, with the band taking greater responsibility for developing and refining the material.

== Composition and lyrics ==
=== Music ===
"Kemosabe"
"Kemosabe" combines syncopated rhythms, a funk-influenced bassline and Higgs's rapid vocal delivery with the more accessible melodic songwriting characteristic of Arc.

Arc has been described as an art rock and indie pop album incorporating elements of electronic music, contemporary R&B, and progressive rock. Compared with Everything Everything's debut album, Man Alive (2010), its compositions generally feature more conventional song structures, prominent melodies and less densely layered arrangements. Writing for NME, Barry Nicolson characterised the album as more focused and restrained than its predecessor, while Laura Snapes of Pitchfork noted a greater emphasis on concise pop songs and slower, emotionally expressive compositions. Nevertheless, the album retains the band's characteristic rhythmic complexity, unconventional vocal delivery and shifts between musical styles.

The opening tracks, "Cough Cough" and "Kemosabe", retain elements of the band's earlier sound, combining intricate rhythms with more conventional pop choruses. "Cough Cough" features prominent percussion and repeated vocal exclamations, while "Kemosabe" incorporates a funk-influenced bassline and Higgs's rapid vocal delivery. Other compositions make greater use of electronic instrumentation and orchestral arrangements. "Duet" prominently features strings, which Higgs initially conceived as the foundation of the song before incorporating the other band members into its arrangement. "Armourland" combines electronic textures with a melodic chorus influenced by the Cars' 1984 single "Drive".

The album also includes several comparatively restrained compositions. "Choice Mountain" features shimmering electronic instrumentation, while "The House Is Dust" is built around sparse piano chords and percussion. The short title track serves as an atmospheric interlude near the middle of the record, separating two contrasting sections of the album. "The Peaks", which Nicolson compared to the minimalism of Sigur Rós, builds towards an expansive conclusion before the album closes with the more rhythmically driven "Don't Try". Critics also identified the use of orchestral strings and contrasting dynamics throughout the record.

=== Lyrics and themes ===
The lyrics of Arc, written by Higgs, explore themes of technological development, consumerism, environmental destruction, isolation and depression. Higgs described the album as concerned with humanity's uncertain future and the possibility of societal collapse, while also examining the emotional consequences of modern life. Nicolson identified technology and disconnection as recurring concerns, particularly in "Cough Cough", "Duet", and "Radiant". Snapes similarly interpreted the album's apocalyptic imagery as reflecting human irresponsibility, alongside more personal anxieties about relationships, ambition and emotional vulnerability.

Several songs address social pressures and the consequences of consumer culture. "Cough Cough" criticises materialism, while "Torso of the Week" concerns body image, physical fitness, and the pressures placed on women to conform to idealised appearances. "Undrowned" expresses Higgs's disillusionment with the entertainment industry, particularly the perceived artificiality of televised talent competitions. In "Radiant", Higgs turns his criticism of social inaction towards himself, acknowledging his own reluctance to confront the problems described in the song.

Other tracks explore more personal experiences of alienation and emotional distress. Higgs described "Kemosabe" as concerning loneliness within a relationship, while "The House Is Dust" depicts the breakdown of a family. "Choice Mountain" uses imagery of animal development and evolution to explore depression and unrealised potential, and "Feet for Hands" was inspired by the experiences of police officer David Rathband, who was blinded in a shooting in 2010. "Duet" portrays a relationship threatened by catastrophe, combining the album's apocalyptic themes with an expression of personal attachment.

The closing track, "Don't Try", addresses depression and the difficulty of expressing emotional distress. Higgs intended the song to encourage openness rather than the suppression of difficult feelings. Snapes regarded this greater emotional vulnerability as a defining characteristic of Arc, contrasting its more direct exploration of personal anxieties with the often opaque and satirical lyrics of Man Alive.

== Release and promotion ==
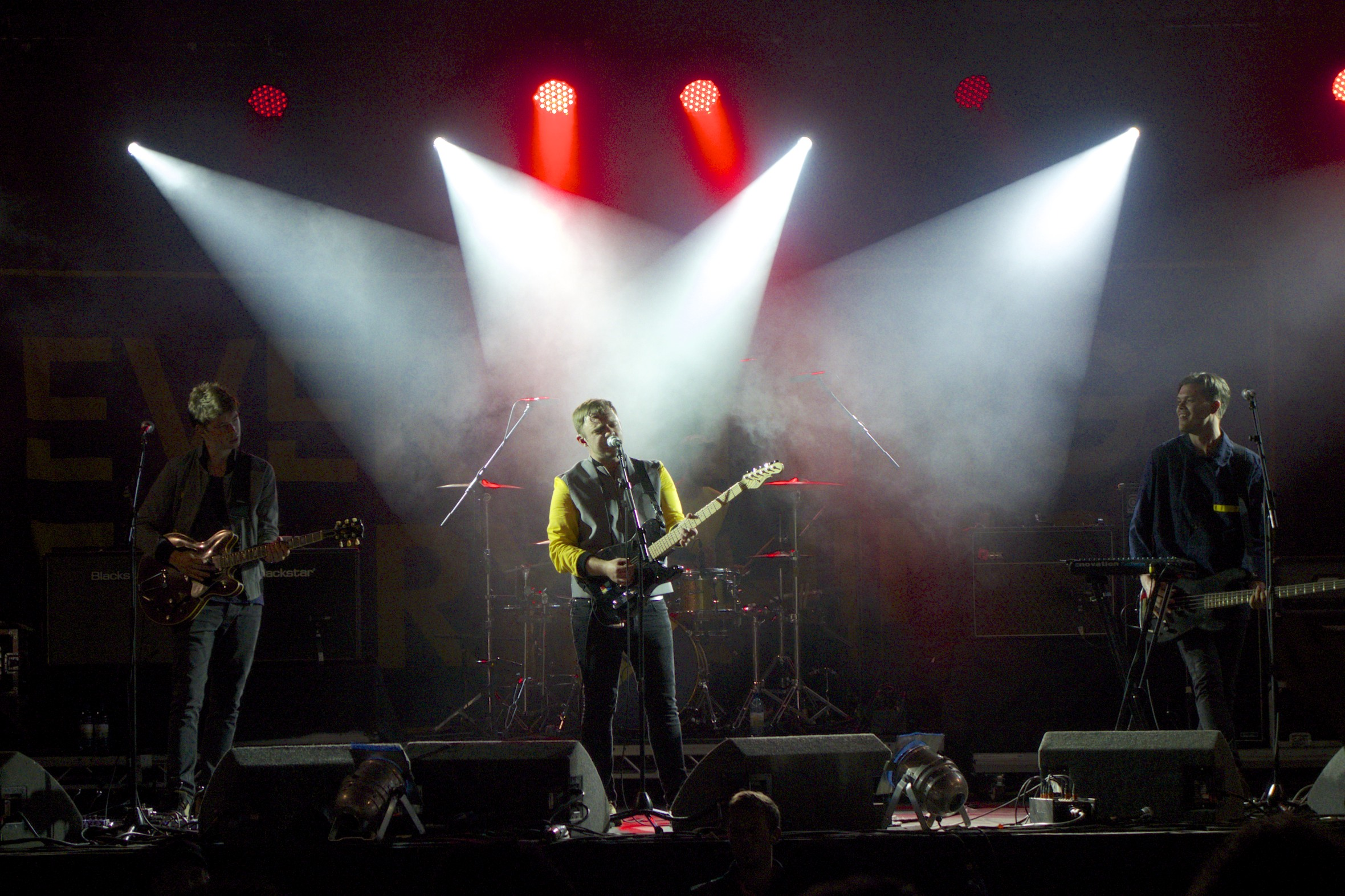
Everything Everything performing at Latitude Festival in 2013

Everything Everything announced Arc on 29 August 2012, alongside the premiere of its lead single, "Cough Cough". The song had received its first radio play on BBC Radio 1 the previous evening, during Zane Lowe's programme, and was subsequently released as a single on 14 October. Its accompanying music video, conceived, directed and edited by vocalist Jonathan Higgs, incorporated images of explosions, oil spills and the band performing against stark visual backdrops. The band promoted the forthcoming album with a series of UK concerts in September and October 2012, followed by European dates supporting Muse in November.

The album's second single, "Kemosabe", premiered on Lowe's BBC Radio 1 programme on 8 November 2012. Its music video, released later that month, was directed by the band and depicted its members performing in a forest. The single was scheduled for release on 7 January 2013, one week before the album. Arc was released in the United Kingdom on 14 January 2013 through RCA Victor, in standard and deluxe editions. The standard edition contained 13 tracks, while the deluxe edition included additional recordings.

To support the album, Everything Everything undertook a 13-date tour of the United Kingdom and Ireland in February 2013, beginning in Portsmouth on 6 February and concluding in Manchester on 22 February. The tour included a sold-out performance at London's Heaven nightclub on 13 February as part of the NME Awards shows, where the band performed several tracks from Arc alongside material from Man Alive. In March, the band announced a further 11-date UK tour for October 2013.

"Duet" was released as the album's third single in March 2013. Higgs directed its music video, which premiered on 6 March and was inspired by the plaster casts of victims of the eruption of Mount Vesuvius at Pompeii. He intended the imagery to reflect the song's depiction of a couple confronting catastrophe together. The fourth single, "Don't Try", followed in June. Its Higgs-directed video premiered in late May and featured increasingly chaotic scenes incorporating classical paintings, elaborate costumes, and brightly coloured imagery. Higgs explained that the video represented the consequences of suppressing difficult emotions, reflecting the song's treatment of depression.

In the United States, the album was preceded by the Cough Cough EP, released on 5 February 2013. Arc subsequently became available through Spotify in the country on 28 May, before receiving a wider digital release through Kemosabe Records and RCA Records on 11 June. The band continued promoting the album through festival performances during the summer, including an appearance at Australia's Splendour in the Grass festival and accompanying concerts in Sydney and Melbourne.

== Critical reception ==
Professional ratings
Aggregate scores
| Source | Rating |
|---|---|
| Metacritic | 79/100 |
Review scores
| Source | Rating |
| Clash | 8/10 |
| Drowned in Sound | 8/10 |
| The Observer | 4/5 stars |
| Mixmag | 4/5 stars |
| musicOMH | 4.5/5 stars |
| NME | 8/10 |
| No Ripcord | 5/10 |
| Pitchfork | 7.6/10 |
| This Is Fake DIY | 8/10 |

Arc received generally favourable reviews from music critics. At Metacritic, which assigns a normalised rating out of 100 to reviews from mainstream publications, the album received an average score of 79, based on 17 reviews. Critics generally praised its more focused songwriting and emotional depth compared with Man Alive, although some questioned the consistency of its musical direction.

Laurence Day of The Line of Best Fit awarded the album nine out of ten, praising its combination of experimental arrangements and accessible pop songwriting. He considered it a more mature and cohesive work than the band's debut, highlighting the emotional weight of songs such as "Duet" and "The House Is Dust". 7digital featured Arc as album of the week, praising the record as "schizophrenic, electro-pop perfection". Martin Headon of musicOMH similarly praised the album's greater confidence and consistency, particularly its concise arrangements and Jonathan Higgs's distinctive vocal performances, although he found the recurring pattern of intricate verses followed by expansive choruses occasionally repetitive. Barry Nicolson of NME welcomed the band's more restrained approach, arguing that the album placed greater emphasis on emotional expression without abandoning their musical inventiveness. He nevertheless criticised the placement of "Don't Try" after "The Peaks", believing that the former undermined the latter's climactic effect.

Laura Snapes of Pitchfork praised the album's combination of eccentric pop songwriting and emotional vulnerability, particularly its treatment of depression and personal insecurity, although she considered some of its slower compositions less successful. Writing for The Observer, Phil Mongredien highlighted the contrast between the densely arranged opening songs and the more subdued second half, praising "Undrowned" and "The House Is Dust" as examples of the band's developing range. Other critics were less enthusiastic. Tim Jonze of The Guardian found the album stylistically inconsistent, arguing that its shifts between frenetic pop and expansive balladry prevented it from achieving a coherent identity. Although he praised "Kemosabe" and "Armourland" for combining these approaches effectively, he regarded the album as evidence of a band still developing its musical direction.

== Track listing ==
All lyrics are written by Jonathan Higgs; all music is composed by Higgs, Jeremy Pritchard, Alex Robertshaw, Michael Spearman.

Standard edition
| No. | Title | Length |
|---|---|---|
| 1. | "Cough Cough" | 3:42 |
| 2. | "Kemosabe" | 3:45 |
| 3. | "Torso of the Week" | 4:33 |
| 4. | "Duet" | 3:42 |
| 5. | "Choice Mountain" | 3:24 |
| 6. | "Feet for Hands" | 3:56 |
| 7. | "Undrowned" | 3:03 |
| 8. | "_Arc_" | 1:28 |
| 9. | "Armourland" | 3:41 |
| 10. | "The House Is Dust" | 3:28 |
| 11. | "Radiant" | 3:52 |
| 12. | "The Peaks" | 5:26 |
| 13. | "Don't Try" | 4:09 |

Deluxe edition bonus tracks
| No. | Title | Length |
|---|---|---|
| 14. | "Awe/Arc" | 4:07 |
| 15. | "No Plan" | 3:47 |
| 16. | "Justice" | 3:08 |
| 17. | "Duet" (alternative version) | 3:50 |
| 18. | "Don't Try" (Everything Everything Remix) | 5:15 |
| 19. | "Distrikt!" | 2:46 |

== Personnel ==
Adapted from the Arc liner notes.

Everything Everything

- Jonathan Higgs – vocals, guitar, keyboards
- Jeremy Pritchard – bass guitar, keyboards, backing vocals
- Alex Robertshaw – guitar, keyboards, backing vocals
- Michael Spearman – drums, backing vocals

Additional performers

- Mike Carswell – coughs (track 1)
- David Kosten – coughs (track 1)
- Ben Cotrill – orchestration (track 4)
- David Coyle – orchestration (track 4)
- Augusta Harris – cello (track: 4, 6, 8)
- Peter Tickell – viola, violin (track 4)

Artwork

- Nadav Kander – photography
- Tappin Gofton – design, art direction

Production

- David Kosten – production, mixing, engineering
- Tom A. D. Fuller – engineering
- Mo Hausler – engineering
- Mike Horner – engineering assistance
- Pete Prokopiw – engineering assistance
- Tim Thomas – additional recording (track 13)
- Metropolis Mastering – mastering

== Charts ==
| Chart (2013) | Peak position |
|---|---|
| Irish Albums (IRMA) | 37 |
| Scottish Albums (Official Charts) | 10 |
| UK Albums (Official Charts) | 5 |
