= Duet (Everything Everything song) =

Single by Everything Everything

from the album Arc
- B-side: "+Pendolino"
- Released: 24 March 2013
- Recorded: 2011 ("+Pendolino"); 2012 ("Duet")
- Genre: Art rock, indie pop, baroque pop
- Length: 3:42
- Label: RCA Victor
- Songwriter(s): Jonathan Higgs
- Producer(s): David Kosten; Everything Everything

Everything Everything singles chronology
"Kemosabe" (2012)	"Duet" (2013)	"Don't Try" (2013)

Music video
- "Duet" on YouTube

"Duet" is a song by British indie pop band Everything Everything. The track was released in the United Kingdom on 24 March 2013 as the third single from the band's second studio album, Arc (2013). The track received its first play on 8 January 2013, with Arc having been selected as BBC Radio 1 DJ Zane Lowe's Album of the Week. The single's B-side "+Pendolino" served as the band's first official instrumental track, having been originally recorded in 2011.

== Track listing ==
Digital download
No.	Title	Length
1.	"Duet"	3:42

Vinyl
No.	Title	Length
1.	"Duet"	3:42
2.	"+Pendolino"	3:48

== Credits and personnel ==
Recording and mixing

- Recorded at RAK Studios, London; Angelic Studios, Halse; Muttley Ranch, London; Jonathan's Flat, Manchester; The Garden, London; Crotch Int. Studios, Gilsland mixed at Muttley Ranch, London.

Personnel

- Songwriting - Jonathan Higgs
- Production - David Kosten, Everything Everything
- Recording - Mo Hauseler, Tom A.D. Fuller, David Kosten
- Assistant Engineering - Mike Horner, Pete Prokopiw
- Mixing - David Kosten
- Mastering - John Davis (at Metropolis Mastering)
- Instrumentation - Jonathan Higgs, Jeremy Pritchard, Alex Robertshaw, Michael Spearman

Credits adapted from the liner notes of Arc, RCA Records, UMP.

== Release history ==
Region	Date	Format
United Kingdom	8 January 2013	Radio airplay
United Kingdom	25 March 2013	Vinyl
