= Re-Animator (album) =

Studio album by Everything Everything
- Released: 11 September 2020
- Recorded: 2019
- Studio: RAK Studios, London
- Genre: Art rock; progressive rock
- Length: 45:18
- Label: Infinity Industries; AWAL
- Producer: John Congleton; Alex Robertshaw

Everything Everything chronology
A Fever Dream (2017)	Re-Animator (2020)	Raw Data Feel (2022)

Singles from Re-Animator
- 1. "In Birdsong" Released: 23 April 2020; 2. "Arch Enemy" Released: 13 May 2020; 3. "Planets" Released: 18 June 2020; 4. "Violent Sun" Released: 28 July 2020

Re-Animator (stylised in all caps) is the fifth studio album by British band Everything Everything. Recorded primarily at RAK Studios in London over a two-week period in December 2019 with producer John Congleton, it was released on 11 September 2020 on Infinity Industries, the band's own imprint. The tracks "In Birdsong", "Arch Enemy", "Planets", and "Violent Sun" were released as singles throughout 2020 in support of the album.

The release of the album was initially planned for 21 August 2020, but was delayed by three weeks due to disruptions caused by the COVID-19 pandemic.

== Recording and production ==
Following the end of touring in support of previous album A Fever Dream, Everything Everything worked throughout 2019 to write and demo the material that would eventually appear on Re-Animator. The album was recorded with producer John Congleton in two weeks in December 2019 at RAK Studios in Regent's Park, London. The band's approach to Re-Animator was to record quickly, resulting in "a looser, less cluttered" sound "that heightens their focus on the fundamentals of songwriting".

Lyrically, Re-Animator has a more introspective tone than previous Everything Everything releases. Freek Stoltenborgh described the album's themes as dealing with "wonderment at the wider world despite the horror of its politics; existentialism and the prolonged, if fading, youthfulness of being in a touring band, and the ominous threat of climate change. All things which contribute to a sense of one door closing while another awaits".

Frontman Jonathan Higgs looked to psychologist Julian Jaynes's theory of bicameral mentality for inspiration. "This idea of the divided self captivated me," said Higgs. "Jaynes attributes this to the origin of gods, people ascribing deity status to this voice they could hear in their head. All this blew my mind, and I started thinking of ways I could make this a central concept. It really touched me. So across the whole record there are millions or [sic] references to this theory to having a split brain, two selves, hearing voices.

== Promotion and release ==
In the build up to the announcement of Re-Animator, the band released a self-made video for single "In Birdsong", featuring a number of scenes created by Jonathan Higgs in open-source modelling software. Higgs told NME that "In Birdsong" was not intended as the lead single for the album, though the ongoing COVID-19 pandemic meant that the track "unexpectedly emerged as the most appropriate song to reappear with", admitting that the band's original choice, "Big Climb", would have been considered in poor taste. The next single, "Arch Enemy", premiered on Annie Mac's BBC Radio 1 show on 13 May 2020.

Two other promotional singles for the album were released in mid-2020, "Planets" on 18 June and "Violent Sun" on 28 July.

Everything Everything originally announced that the album would be released on 21 August 2020, but their plans of having a concert to celebrate the release of the album were called off as a result of COVID-19 pandemic precautions. Instead, the band released the album on 11 September along with lyric videos for all individual tracks on the album and a VR concert. The celebration of the concert was marred by technical issues which the band issued an apology for later the same day. The album's release was followed by a Reddit AMA held by two of the band members, Jonathan Higgs and Jeremy Pritchard.

The album was the first to be released through Infinity Industries, the band's own imprint, in partnership with AWAL.

== Reception ==
Professional ratings
Aggregate scores
Source	Rating
AnyDecentMusic?	7.9/10
Metacritic	84/100
Review scores
Source	Rating
DIY	4/5 stars
The Independent	5/5 stars
The Line of Best Fit	8.5/10
Pitchfork	6.8/10

The album received widespread critical acclaim. At Metacritic, which assigns a normalised score out of 100, the album received a score of 84 based on 10 reviews, indicating "universal acclaim".

The Independent gave the LP a perfect score, saying it is "the most assured the band have ever been".

Pitchfork stated that the album's lyrics are "more direct than ever", and praised many of the different songs: "[Violent Sun] is an urgent "last chance before the night ends"-type song, and their most romantic ever. It's thrilling to hear Higgs apply his odd-but-visceral writing style to a love song: "You can barely make a silhouette out/And you open your ventriloquist mouth/And the words are wrong but in the right order." The bicameral-mind concept pops up in several songs, most notably in "The Actor," where Higgs' narrator comes to terms with the other voice in their head ("if we look the same/then I don't mind")."

== Track listing ==
All tracks are written by Jonathan Higgs, Jeremy Pritchard, Alex Robertshaw, and Michael Spearman.

No.	Title	Length
1.	"Lost Powers"	3:41
2.	"Big Climb"	3:54
3.	"It Was a Monstering"	4:34
4.	"Planets"	3:57
5.	"Moonlight"	3:40
6.	"Arch Enemy"	3:51
7.	"Lord of the Trapdoor"	4:26
8.	"Black Hyena"	3:58
9.	"In Birdsong"	5:13
10.	"The Actor"	4:04
11.	"Violent Sun"	4:00
Total length:		45:18

== Charts ==
Chart performance for Re-Animator
Chart (2020)	Peak position
Scottish Albums (OCC)	4
UK Albums (OCC)	5
