= Raw Data Feel =

Studio album by Everything Everything
- Released: 20 May 2022
- Recorded: 2021
- Studios: Eve (Stockport); Ludwick (Shrewsbury); Making Deux (Stockport)
- Genres: Pop, synthpop, electronica, EDM, new wave, alternative rock
- Length: 54:06
- Labels: Infinity Industries; AWAL
- Producers: Kaines; Tom A.D.

Everything Everything chronology
Re-Animator (2020)	Raw Data Feel (2022)	Mountainhead (2024)

Singles from Raw Data Feel
- 1. "Bad Friday" Released: 7 February 2022; 2. "Teletype" Released: 9 March 2022; 3. "I Want a Love Like This" Released: 28 March 2022; 4. "Pizza Boy" Released: 4 May 2022

Professional ratings
Aggregate scores
Source	Rating
Metacritic	75/100
Review scores
Source	Rating
DIY	3/5 stars
The Line of Best Fit	9/10
MusicOMH	4.5/5 stars
NME	4/5 stars
Pitchfork	4.8/10
Record Collector	4/5 stars
The Skinny	4/5 stars
The Telegraph	4/5 stars
Under the Radar	8.5/10

Raw Data Feel is the sixth studio album by British band Everything Everything, released on 20 May 2022 through Infinity Industries, the band's own imprint. The album was produced by the band's guitarist Alex Robertshaw and Tom A.D. Fuller, and its release was preceded by the singles "Bad Friday" (7 February), "Teletype" (9 March), "I Want a Love Like This" (28 March) and "Pizza Boy" (4 May). On 27 May 2022, The album reached #4 in the UK Album Charts, their highest-charting release to date. The album's creation was inspired by the band's experiences with artificial intelligence, which was employed to help provide ideas for song lyrics as well as the album's artwork.

== Themes ==
The songs on Raw Data Feel deal with the theme of experiencing trauma and relying on technology to cope with it. Feeling constrained by his reputation as a "political singer" and wanting to "abandon the human brain", frontman and lead songwriter Jonathan Higgs envisioned a more inward, less sociopolitical approach by using characters to play the experience out.

With assistance from Mark Hanslip, a musician and researcher at the University of York's Contemporary Music Research Centre, Higgs developed an AI bot dubbed "Kevin", named after a recurring character in the album, to compose song lyrics generatively. Higgs fed it four different sources of information—LinkedIn's terms and conditions, the epic poem Beowulf, 400,000 posts from the message board 4chan, and the sayings of Confucius—before compiling and tweaking the results into usable material. Ultimately, the bot contributed roughly 5% of the album's lyrics and a song title ("Software Greatman"), receiving a songwriting credit in the process, and has also provided the imagery for the album's artwork and promotional campaign.

The band described the album's sound as "vivid, bright and spontaneous" and their "most natural and impulsive work".

== Track listing ==
All tracks are written by Jonathan Higgs, Alex Robertshaw, Jeremy Pritchard, and Michael Spearman, with lyrics by Higgs and "Kevin".

Raw Data Feel track listing
No.	Title	Length
1.	"Teletype"	3:40
2.	"I Want a Love Like This"	3:27
3.	"Bad Friday"	3:11
4.	"Pizza Boy"	3:32
5.	"Jennifer"	4:17
6.	"Metroland Is Burning"	3:44
7.	"Leviathan"	5:20
8.	"Shark Week"	3:34
9.	"Cut Up!"	3:23
10.	"Hex"	2:43
11.	"My Computer"	3:06
12.	"Kevin's Car"	4:02
13.	"Born Under a Meteor"	4:02
14.	"Software Greatman"	6:05
Total length:		54:06

== Personnel ==
Everything Everything

- Jonathan Higgs – performance, art
- Alex Robertshaw – performance, production, engineering (Note: Credited as Kaines.)
- Jeremy Pritchard – performance
- Michael Spearman – performance

Additional contributors

- Tom A.D. – production, engineering
- Frank Arkwright – mastering
- Cenzo Townshend – mixing
- Camden Clarke – mixing assistance
- Jan Ashwell – mixing assistance
- Henry Broadhead – engineering assistance
- Martin King – engineering assistance
- "Kevin" – art
- Charlotte Audrey – design
- Jonny Costello – design

== Charts ==
Chart performance for Raw Data Feel
Chart (2022)	Peak position
Scottish Albums (Official Charts)	4
UK Albums (Official Charts)	4
UK Independent Albums (Official Charts)	1
