= Tom Whyman =

British philosopher

Tom Whyman is an academic philosopher and writer. Whyman is a freelance writer and teaches philosophy part-time at the University of Durham. He has undertaken studies in the following fields: Frankfurt School critical theory, German idealism, Kierkegaard, and contemporary ethical naturalism.

Whyman was born in Frimley, Surrey, and currently lives in Gateshead.

He published 'Infinitely Full of Hope: Fatherhood and the Future in an Age of Crisis and Disaster', which discusses the philosophy of hope and despair, in relation to parenthood and the upcoming birth of his child.

He ran as a Green Party candidate in the 2026 Gateshead Metropolitan Borough Council election.

== Books ==
- Infinitely Full of Hope: Fatherhood and the Future in an Age of Crisis and Disaster, Repeater Books: ISBN 9781913462253
- The German Ideology: A New Abridgement, Repeater Books: ISBN 978-1913462956
