= Don't Try (Everything Everything song) =

Single by Everything Everything

from the album Arc
- B-side: "Everybody's Got to Learn Sometime"
- Released: 16 June 2013
- Recorded: 2012
- Genre: Art rock, indie pop, indie rock, contemporary R&B
- Length: 4:09
- Label: RCA Victor
- Songwriter: Jonathan Higgs
- Producers: David Kosten; Everything Everything

Everything Everything singles chronology
| "Duet" (2013) | "Don't Try" (2013) | "Distant Past" (2015) |

Music video
- "Don't Try" on YouTube

"Don't Try" is a song from British indie pop band Everything Everything. The track was released in the United Kingdom on 16 June 2013 as the fourth single from the band's second studio album, Arc (2013). The single's B-side is a live recording from the Maida Vale Studios of The Korgis' "Everybody's Got to Learn Sometime". The recording comes from 17 October 2012, where the band covered the track for BBC Radio 1 DJ Zane Lowe.

== Track listing ==
Digital download
| No. | Title | Length |
|---|---|---|
| 1. | "Don't Try" | 4:02 |

Vinyl
| No. | Title | Length |
|---|---|---|
| 1. | "Don't Try" | 4:02 |
| 2. | "Everybody's Got to Learn Sometime" (Live from Maida Vale Studios) | 3:54 |

== Credits and personnel ==
Recording and mixing

- Recorded at RAK Studios, London; Angelic Studios, Halse; Muttley Ranch, London; Jonathan's Flat, Manchester; The Garden, London; Crotch Int. Studios, Gilsland mixed at Muttley Ranch, London.

Personnel

- Songwriting - Jonathan Higgs
- Production - David Kosten, Everything Everything
- Recording - Mo Hauseler, Tom A.D. Fuller, David Kosten
- Assistant Engineering - Mike Horner, Pete Prokopiw
- Mixing - David Kosten
- Mastering - John Davis (at Metropolis Mastering)
- Instrumentation - Jonathan Higgs, Jeremy Pritchard, Alex Robertshaw, Michael Spearman

Credits adapted from the liner notes of Arc, RCA Records, UMP.

== Release history ==
| Region | Date | Format |
|---|---|---|
| United Kingdom | 16 June 2013 | Vinyl |
