= Man Alive (Everything Everything album) =

Studio album by Everything Everything
- Released: 30 August 2010
- Recorded: 2008–2010
- Studios: Bryn Derwen Studios (Bethesda, Gwynedd, Wales); Cream Studios (London, England); Gilsland (Cumbria, England); Moolah Rouge (Stockport, England); Muttley Ranch (London, England); The Pool (London, England)
- Genres: Art rock; indie rock
- Length: 52:04
- Label: Geffen
- Producer: David Kosten

Everything Everything chronology
Man Alive (2010)	Arc (2013)

Singles from Man Alive
- 1. "Suffragette Suffragette" Released: 1 December 2008; 2. "Photoshop Handsome" Released: 25 May 2009; 3. "My Kz, Ur Bf" Released: 5 October 2009; 4. "Schoolin'" Released: 14 June 2010

Man Alive is the debut studio album by British band Everything Everything. Recorded between 2008 and 2010 at studios in England and Wales with producer David Kosten, it was released in August 2010 through Geffen Records. The album peaked at number 17 on the UK Albums Chart. The songs "Suffragette Suffragette", "Photoshop Handsome", "My Kz, Ur Bf" and "Schoolin'" were released as singles between 2008 and 2010, though the first three were re-recorded for the album.

An art rock and indie pop album, Man Alive incorporates a wide variety of influences from math rock,contemporary R&B, hip-hop, classical and electronic music. Its songs are characterised by unconventional rhythms, intricate arrangements, and the falsetto vocals of lead singer Jonathan Higgs. The lyrics explore themes including mortality, technological change, personal responsibility, and wider social concerns. Much of the album originated in home-recorded demos by Higgs, which the band developed and rearranged during recording.

Man Alive received generally favourable reviews from music critics, who praised its originality and musical ambition, although some criticised its complexity and lack of cohesion. It appeared on several year-end lists of the best albums of 2010, including those published by The Fly and NME. The album was nominated for the 2011 Mercury Prize and for Best Album at the Ivor Novello Awards, while "My Kz, Ur Bf" received a nomination for Best Song Musically and Lyrically at the latter ceremony. A deluxe vinyl reissue containing demos and previously unreleased recordings followed in 2023.

== Recording and production ==
The material on Man Alive was developed over several years, combining songs written during the band's early history with compositions created during the recording sessions. During this period, Everything Everything released their first three singles: "Suffragette Suffragette" (2008), "Photoshop Handsome" (2009) and "My Kz, Ur Bf" (2009). All three songs were subsequently re-recorded for the album. According to bassist Jeremy Pritchard, some songs on Man Alive were developed collaboratively from Jonathan Higgs's demos, while others retained much of their original arrangements. A selection of early demos, alternate recordings and previously unreleased material were later included on a deluxe version of the album, released in 2023.

The majority of Man Alive was recorded at Bryn Derwen Studios, a small residential recording studio in Bethesda, Gwynedd, Wales, in a series of sessions lasting approximately two weeks each. Additional recording took place at studios in London, Stockport, and Cumbria. The album was produced by David Kosten, with whom the band had previously worked on "My Kz, Ur Bf". The success of these initial sessions encouraged the band to continue working with him on the album. During its development, founding guitarist Alex Niven departed to resume his studies and was replaced by Alex Robertshaw, who co-wrote and performed on most of the finished recordings.

The recording process was characterised by the band's willingness to experiment with arrangements and combine disparate musical ideas. Higgs later explained that the group had deliberately avoided imposing stylistic restrictions on their debut album, preferring to develop numerous ideas before refining them. Bassist Jeremy Pritchard described Kosten as an important influence on this process, sometimes encouraging the band to simplify their arrangements to achieve a greater emotional effect, while at other times supporting their more elaborate experimentation.

"Photoshop Handsome" began as a comparatively slow composition influenced by new jack swing, described by the band as reminiscent of PJ and Duncan. It was developed into a guitar-based arrangement reminiscent of the Smiths and Blur, before synthesizer parts from the original demo were reintroduced. "Come Alive Diana" was assembled from two previously separate compositions: the verse, title and lyrical basis of an earlier song were combined with material from a composition provisionally titled "Even the Dogs". Likewise, "My Kz, Ur Bf" began life as a track the band struggled to work with entitled "Airstrike On Your Forehead", before Kosten suggested putting the chorus at the beginning of the song.

Other songs underwent substantial changes during recording. "NASA Is on Your Side" was among the first compositions recorded with Kosten, who helped the band reproduce the heavily processed drum sounds of Higgs's original demo. The recording was subsequently accelerated slightly and revised to create a colder arrangement than the band's live version. By contrast, "Two for Nero" was not originally intended for inclusion on the album, having fallen out of the band's live repertoire partly because Higgs struggled to sing its high vocal parts. Its sparse opening arrangement gives way to an improvised instrumental passage, recorded in approximately three takes. More improvisation was employed on "Final Form", with the bassline recorded live.

== Music and lyrics ==
"Schoolin'"
"Schoolin'" illustrates Man Alive's combination of contemporary R&B influences, Brazilian-influenced percussion and Higgs's distinctive vocal delivery.

Man Alive has been described as an art rock and indie pop album incorporating elements of math rock, contemporary R&B, hip-hop, and electronic music. Its sound is characterised by irregular rhythms, intricate arrangements, layered vocal harmonies and the frequent use of falsetto by Higgs. Critics situated Everything Everything within a tradition of experimental British art pop, drawing comparisons with the music of XTC, Foals, Field Music, while also noting the band's incorporation of dance-oriented pop and contemporary R&B production. Simmy Richman of The Independent compared the album with the work of Electric Light Orchestra and 10cc, describing its combination of art-rock experimentation and accessible dance music.

The album's arrangements frequently contrast conventional pop melodies with complex rhythmic and instrumental passages. Writing for The Quietus, Simon Jay Catling described the band's tendency to reshape accessible pop compositions through unexpected structural changes. Kitty Empire of The Observer identified the influence of mainstream R&B in the production of the album's opening songs, particularly "Schoolin'", which features prominent keyboards and rhythmic percussion. The opening track, "My Kz, Ur Bf", combines electronic and guitar-based instrumentation with Higgs's rapid vocal delivery, while "Qwerty Finger" juxtaposes comparatively conventional pop instrumentation with unconventional vocal arrangements.

Other tracks adopt a more restrained approach. "Leave the Engine Room" features a comparatively sparse electronic arrangement, which Tiffany Daniels of The Line of Best Fit contrasted with the complexity of the album's opening tracks. "Two for Nero" incorporates harpsichord-like instrumentation and layered vocal harmonies, while "NASA Is on Your Side" is a piano-led ballad, described by John O'Brien of AllMusic as "chiming dubstep". Catling identified "Tin (The Manhole)" as an example of the album's quieter, more reflective compositions, contrasting these tracks with the energetic arrangements of "Photoshop Handsome" and "Suffragette Suffragette".

Higgs's vocals are a prominent feature of the album, alternating between falsetto singing, dense harmonies and rhythmically delivered passages that critics compared to rapping. Empire noted both the large number of syllables compressed into individual lines and the use of layered falsetto harmonies.

Jonathan Higgs performing at the Live Music Festival in Kraków in 2011

Higgs sought to avoid lyrical clichés, aiming to make the words as unpredictable as the band's music. The often cryptic lyrics could prove difficult even for the other band members to interpret: Pritchard recalled that some passages remained obscure to them, although he considered this ambiguity part of their appeal. The chorus of "Suffragette Suffragette" attracted attention for its ambiguous pronunciation of the word "fence", which reviewers noted could be heard as "face", giving the lyric a sexual double meaning. Catling characterised the lyrics as a stream of consciousness, moving between relationships, nostalgia and apparently unrelated imagery.

The album's lyrics frequently explore human mortality, technological change and the relationship between individuals and the wider world. Higgs described his approach to songwriting as combining multiple subjects and perspectives within individual compositions, sometimes conveying several emotions simultaneously. Higgs described "NASA Is on Your Side" as juxtaposing the emotional intensity of adolescence and school shootings with environmental concerns, including the depletion of fossil fuels and the imagined use of human bodies as an alternative energy source.

Several songs address physical deterioration and the passage of time. Higgs explained that "Qwerty Finger" refers to the eventual decomposition of the human body; Higgs later connected the song's title to his interest in obsolete technology surviving the decline of human civilisation, citing the American band Grandaddy as an influence. "Final Form" was inspired by and dedicated to a late friend of Higgs' who was disabled, concerning bodily decline and the failure to realise one's physical potential. "Tin (The Manhole)" explores the imagery of an urban fox that has been hit by a vehicle, which subsequently inspired the album's cover artwork; its lyrics were written during a train ride from Oxford to Manchester. Elsewhere, "Two for Nero" presents a narrative through two unidentified speakers, while "Photoshop Handsome" incorporates a reference to the British television sitcom Bottom. "Leave the Engine Room" explores "Anglo-Saxon guilt" and ancestral sin.

== Promotion and release ==
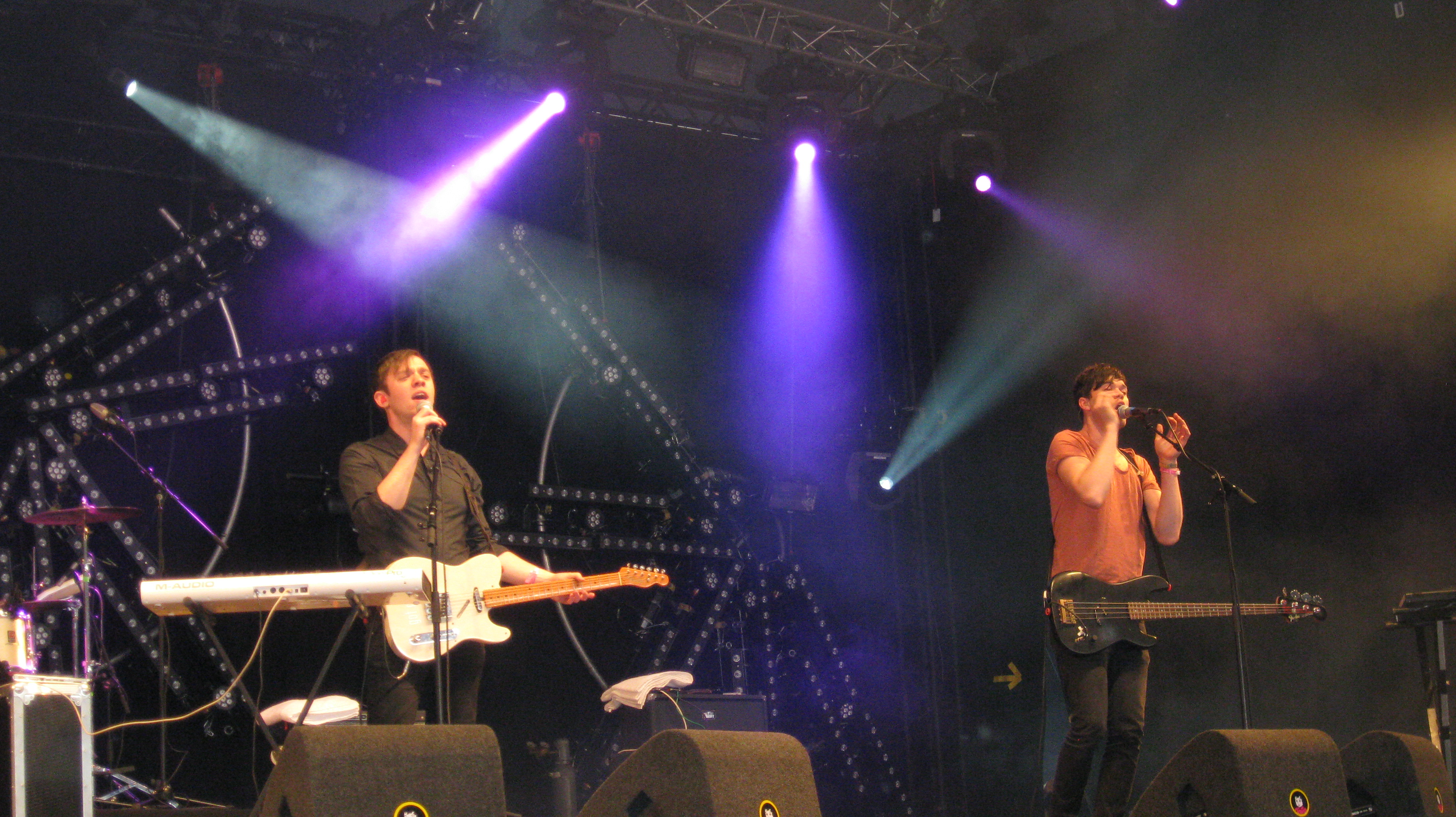
Everything Everything (vocalist Higgs and bassist Pritchard pictured) performing in support of the album in 2010

Before the release of Man Alive, Everything Everything issued three limited-edition vinyl singles: "Suffragette Suffragette" through XL Recordings in December 2008, "Photoshop Handsome" in May 2009, and "My Kz, Ur Bf" through Young and Lost Club in October 2009. The band produced music videos for the first two singles themselves. In December 2009, Everything Everything were included on the longlist for the BBC's Sound of 2010 poll, and subsequently signed to Geffen Records. "Schoolin'" was released as their first single for the label in June 2010, followed by a reissue of "My Kz, Ur Bf" on 23 August. Higgs told God Is in the TV that signing to a major label made it more likely that the reissue would receive radio play.

The album was released on 30 August 2010 through Geffen Records in the United Kingdom. Higgs explained that the album's title was derived from its lyrics, although the band had briefly considered naming it "Taj Mahal". The cover artwork depicts an urban red fox, taken from a photograph by Swiss wildlife photographer Laurent Geslin and digitally manipulated by design studio Tappin Gofton. The image was inspired by "Tin (The Manhole)", which Higgs described as telling the story of an urban fox that absorbs pollution and grows to an enormous size. The band incorporated digital distortion into the photograph to evoke the themes of technology and disorder found throughout the album. Additional photography for the packaging was provided by Paul Cecil.

The band promoted the album with festival appearances and live performances during the summer of 2010. On 27 August, Everything Everything performed seven songs from Man Alive at Leeds Festival, incorporating a passage from Rihanna's "Rude Boy" into "Schoolin'". To mark the album's release, they performed an intimate show at the Barfly in Camden Town, wearing white boilersuits, which the NME likened to the uniform of the anarchist group the WOMBLES. A UK headline tour followed in September and October, including performances at London's Scala and Manchester's Deaf Institute. The band also appeared on Later... with Jools Holland, performing "Photoshop Handsome" and "My Kz, Ur Bf", before travelling to New York for appearances at the CMJ Music Marathon. The album entered the UK Albums Chart at number 17.

=== Reissue ===
On 25 August 2023, Man Alive was reissued on vinyl in standard and deluxe editions. The deluxe double-LP included a second disc of early singles, demos, outtakes and other recordings from the band's formative years, including "Even the Dogs", "Riot on the Ward", and demo versions of "Come Alive Diana" and "Crisis Over". It also included the original single versions of "Suffragette Suffragette" and "Photoshop Handsome". The deluxe edition was issued in a gatefold sleeve with a poster and expanded booklet.

The additional recordings were selected by the band from their archive. Drummer Michael Spearman explained that the reissue was intended to document the band's development before the release of their debut album, with the selection reflecting both the recordings' historical interest and the band's own preferences.

== Critical reception ==
Professional ratings
Aggregate scores
Source	Rating
Metacritic	72/100
Review scores
Source	Rating
BBC	(very positive)
Drowned in Sound	7/10 stars
The Fly	4.5/5 stars
The Guardian	3/5 stars
musicOMH	4.5/5 stars
NME	8/10 stars
Pitchfork	3.8/10

Man Alive received generally favourable reviews from music critics, who praised its originality, eclectic influences, and ambitious arrangements, although some considered the album overly complicated or uneven. At Metacritic which assigns a normalised rating out of 100 to reviews from mainstream publications, the album received an average score of 72, based on eight reviews.

Several critics praised the band's experimental approach to pop songwriting. BBC Music's Alix Buscovic commented that "[Everything Everything] know more than most how to craft a song, how to make an album. They know how to give it depth, light and dark, and they – crucially – know when to stop." Simon Jay Catling of The Quietus similarly praised the album's ambition and the band's confidence in stretching conventional pop structures without abandoning their accessibility. Simmy Richman of The Independent admired its originality and the combination of art-rock influences with dance-oriented pop, although he considered the band occasionally too conscious of its own ingenuity. Writing for NME, Laura Snapes likened the band's unconventional arrangements to an intricate puzzle, praising their ability to make familiar pop elements sound unusual. The UK trade magazine Music Week named Man Alive "album of the week" in their 4 September edition.

The album's individual compositions attracted contrasting assessments. Kitty Empire of The Observer particularly praised the influence of contemporary R&B on its opening tracks, singling out "Schoolin'" for its rhythmic energy and melodic appeal. She also admired "Two for Nero" and the comparatively restrained "Leave the Engine Room", but felt that the album became less compelling as its R&B influences diminished. Tiffany Daniels of The Line of Best Fit similarly identified "Final Form" and "Leave the Engine Room" as successful examples of the band's songwriting, although she was generally critical of the record's elaborate arrangements. Other reviewers praised the album's quieter moments, with Mojo highlighting the effectiveness of its three ballads.

Some critics found the band's stylistic experimentation excessive. Daniels argued that the album's complex arrangements and Higgs's high-register vocals frequently obscured its melodies, making the record increasingly tiresome. Giving the album 3.8 out of ten, Ian Cohen of Pitchfork argued the album filled a niche that "was unoccupied for good reason", comparing its sound to "what would happen if Dismemberment Plan got a crash course in Pro Tools and a record deal with Fueled By Ramen". He considered its combination of unusual time signatures, electronic instrumentation and rapid vocal delivery overwhelming, and argued that the disparate elements failed to form a cohesive whole.

=== Accolades ===
Man Alive appeared on several publications' year-end lists of the best albums of 2010. It was ranked fifth by both The Fly and Gigwise, 35th by Q, and 43rd by NME. The album's single "Schoolin'" was also ranked eighth on Gigwise's list of the 50 best songs of 2010.

Man Alive was shortlisted for the 2011 Mercury Prize, though this was ultimately won by PJ Harvey's Let England Shake. The album also received a nomination for Best Album at the 2011 Ivor Novello Awards, while the single "My Kz, Ur Bf" was nominated for Best Song Musically and Lyrically.

== Track listing ==
No.	Title	Writer(s)	Length
1.	"My Kz, Ur Bf"	Jonathan Higgs; Jeremy Pritchard; Michael Spearman; Alex Niven	3:37
2.	"Qwerty Finger"	Higgs; Pritchard; Spearman; Alex Robertshaw; Niven	3:53
3.	"Schoolin'"	Higgs; Pritchard; Spearman; Robertshaw	4:40
4.	"Leave the Engine Room"	Higgs; Pritchard; Spearman; Robertshaw	3:09
5.	"Final Form"	Higgs; Pritchard; Spearman; Robertshaw	5:28
6.	"Photoshop Handsome"	Higgs; Pritchard; Spearman; Robertshaw; Niven	3:19
7.	"Two for Nero"	Higgs; Pritchard; Spearman; Robertshaw	4:22
8.	"Suffragette Suffragette"	Higgs; Pritchard; Spearman; Robertshaw; Niven	4:06
9.	"Come Alive Diana"	Higgs; Pritchard; Spearman; Robertshaw	4:15
10.	"NASA Is on Your Side"	Higgs; Pritchard; Spearman; Robertshaw; Niven	5:06
11.	"Tin (The Manhole)"	Higgs; Pritchard; Spearman; Robertshaw	4:29
12.	"Weights"	Higgs; Pritchard; Spearman; Robertshaw; Niven	5:40
Total length:			52:04

iTunes bonus track
No.	Title	Length
13.	"Hiawatha Doomed"	3:25

Japanese bonus track
No.	Title	Length
13.	"Wizard Talk"	5:17

Deluxe disc 2
No.	Title	Writer(s)	Length
13.	"Luddites and Lambs"	Higgs; Pritchard; Spearman; Niven	3:46
14.	"Suffragette Suffragette - Single Version / 2008"	Higgs	4:05
15.	"Crisis Over - Demo"	Higgs; Pritchard; Spearman; Niven	3:05
16.	"Come Alive Diana - Demo"	Higgs; Pritchard; Spearman; Robertshaw	4:05
17.	"Hey Jude Law - Demo"	Higgs; Pritchard; Spearman; Niven	2:42
18.	"The Kids Are Obese - Demo"	Higgs; Pritchard; Spearman; Niven	2:16
19.	"Riot on the Ward"	Higgs; Pritchard; Spearman; Robertshaw	3:32
20.	"DNA Dump"	Higgs; Pritchard; Spearman; Niven	3:05
21.	"Photoshop Handsome - 7" Version/2009"	Higgs	3:25
22.	"Even the Dogs"	Higgs; Pritchard; Spearman; Robertshaw	4:12
23.	"Hiawatha Doomed"	Higgs; Pritchard; Spearman; Robertshaw; Niven	3:26
24.	"Schoolin' - Acoustic Version"	Higgs; Pritchard; Spearman; Robertshaw; Niven	4:58
25.	"Wizard Talk"	Higgs; Pritchard; Spearman; Robertshaw	5:03
26.	"Carry Me Home"	Sedric Thomas Johnson; Will Mount	3:52
27.	"Hiawatha Doomed - Demo"	Higgs; Pritchard; Spearman; Robertshaw; Niven	4:01
Total length:			55:33

== Personnel ==
Adapted from the Man Alive liner notes.

Everything Everything

- Jonathan Higgs – vocals, guitar, keyboards, programming
- Jeremy Pritchard – bass guitar, backing vocals, keyboards
- Alex Robertshaw – guitar, backing vocals, programming, keyboards
- Michael Spearman – drums, percussion, backing vocals, keyboards

Additional performers

- Alex Niven – guitar, backing vocals (track: 1, 10)
- Charles Robertshaw – saxophone (track 3)
- Matt Roberts – trumpet (track 9)

Artwork

- Laurent Geslin – album cover photography
- Paul Cecil – liner notes photography
- Tappin Gofton – design, digital imaging

Production

- David Kosten – production, mixing (tracks: 4, 5, 7, 10, 11)
- Lexxx – engineering (tracks: 2, 9), additional recording (tracks: 2, 9)
- Mark Eastwood – engineering (tracks: 1, 10)
- Everything Everything – recording, production, engineering (tracks: 2, 4)
- Metropolis Mastering – mastering
- John Davies – mastering engineer (track 3)
- Adrian Bushby – mixing (tracks: 1–3, 6, 9, 12)
- Jonathan Higgs (Childbirth) – additional production, recording (tracks: 4, 7, 11)
- Daniel Rejmer – recording (tracks: 2, 9)
- David Wrench – recording

== Charts ==
Chart (2010)	Peak position
Scottish Albums (Official Charts)	40
UK Albums (Official Charts)	17
