= Alex Niven =

British writer and musician

- Born: 18 February 1984 (age 42); Hexham, Northumberland, England
- Occupation: Writer

Academic background
- Education: Queen Elizabeth High School
- Alma mater: University of Bristol (BA); University of Oxford (MSt, DPhil)
- Thesis: Basil Bunting's late modernism : from Pound to poetic community (2013)
- Doctoral advisor: Ron Bush

Academic work
- Discipline: English literature
- Sub-discipline: Modernist poetry
- Institutions: Newcastle University
- Website: Alex Niven publications on Academia.edu

Alex Niven (born 18 February 1984) is an English writer, poet, editor, academic and musician. As of 2025 he is a lecturer in English literature at Newcastle University and the editor of Tribune.

== Early life and education ==
Niven was born in Hexham, Northumberland and educated at Queen Elizabeth High School. He grew up in Fourstones, a village he has described as "idyllic in childhood" but "a pretty gloomy place to be an adolescent" due to its poor transport links. He studied at the University of Bristol (BA) and University of Oxford where he was awarded a Master of Studies (MSt) degree followed by a Doctor of Philosophy degree in 2013 with a thesis on modernist poetry, Basil Bunting and Ezra Pound supervised by Ron Bush.

== Career ==
In 2006, Niven was a founding member of the indie art rock band Everything Everything, with friends from Queen Elizabeth High School and played guitar with the band between 2007 and 2009. In 2009, he left the band to study for a doctorate at St John's College.

Niven worked as an assistant editor at New Left Review from 2014 to 2015 and in 2014 helped to start the publisher Repeater Books, responsible for publishing books by Mark Fisher, Dawn Foster, Grace Blakeley and others. He has contributed journalism and reviews to The Guardian, The New York Times, Pitchfork, The Face, New Statesman, Los Angeles Review of Books, Jacobin and Tribune, and has been described by the writer Ian Sansom as "one of the UK's rather more interesting younger cultural critics".

Niven's writing largely focuses on questions of national identity (he is a notable sceptic of English national identity), regionalism, left-wing populism and the cultural heritage of Northern England (especially North East England).

=== Publications ===
In 2011 his first work of criticism, Folk Opposition, was published by Zero Books. The book attempted to reclaim a variety of populist and folk culture motifs for the political left. Writing in the journal of the Institute for Public Policy Research, Niki Seth-Smith described it as a "rebuttal to ... knee jerk reactions [about folk culture] by way of careful historicisation and incisive cultural analysis", while Joe Kennedy of The Quietus described it as "one of 2011's most incisive polemics".

In 2014, his second book, a study of the Oasis album Definitely Maybe, was published in Bloomsbury Publishing's 33 1/3 series. Summarising the book in Pitchfork, Stephen M. Deusner wrote that Niven "makes his arguments with such insight that for a while I did come to think of Oasis as a bunch of leftist revolutionaries reconceiving pop music as a vehicle for working-class liberation."

In 2019, his third book was published: New Model Island: How to Build a Radical Culture Beyond the Idea of England. Tom Whyman described it in Jacobin as "suffused with a deep love of the North East", while Tim Burrows of The Guardian called it "a rare thing: a critique that provides practical suggestions about how to change things – specifically England – for the better."

In 2023, his book on Northern England, The North Will Rise Again: In Search of the Future in Northern Heartlands, was published by Bloomsbury Publishing. It was described by Andy Burnham as a "great book", though Stuart Maconie, writing in New Statesman, was critical of Niven's judgement that descriptions of Diane Abbott as "disgusting" and "stupid" by voters during the 2019 United Kingdom general election were influenced by racial prejudice. Maconie argued that "it is simply not good enough to slander anyone ... unimpressed by Diane Abbott as a racist".
