= Jonathan Higgs =

English singer (born 1985)

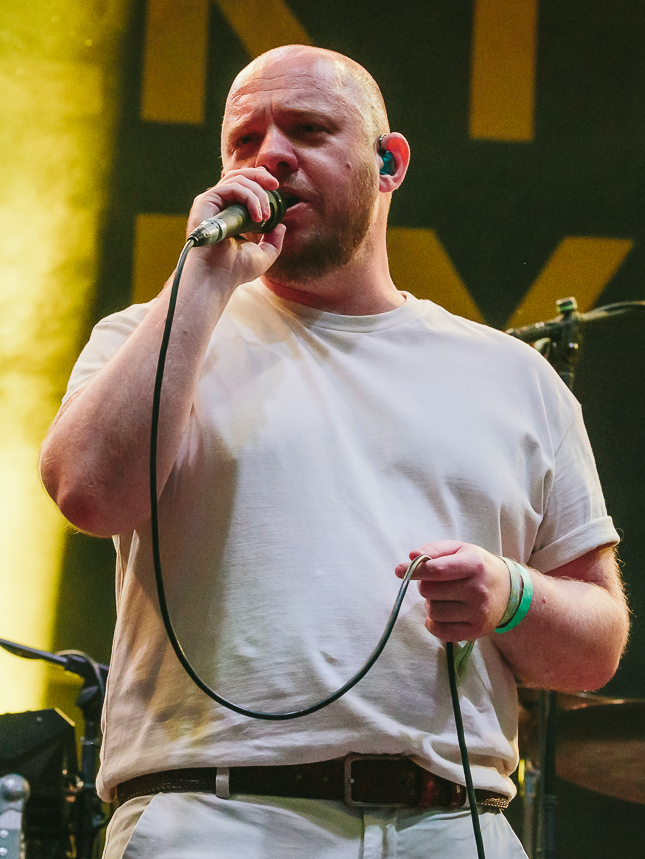
- Higgs performing 2022

Background information
- Born: Jonathan Joseph Higgs; 23 February 1985 (age 41); Newcastle upon Tyne, England
- Genres: Art rock; indie rock; math rock; baroque pop; indietronica; progressive rock; pop rock; indie pop
- Occupations: Singer-songwriter; musician
- Instruments: Vocals; guitar; keyboards; programming; drums
- Years active: 2007–present
- Member of: Everything Everything

Jonathan Joseph Higgs (born 23 February 1985) is an English singer, songwriter, filmmaker, director and multi-instrumentalist. He is best known as the frontman of the art rock band Everything Everything, with whom he has released seven studio albums and five EPs. He is noted for having an unusually wide vocal range, particularly his use of falsetto.

== Biography ==
=== Early life ===
Jonathan Joseph Higgs was born in Newcastle upon Tyne on 23 February 1985, and was raised in Northumberland, in the village of Gilsland. He studied in Hexham at the Queen Elizabeth High School when he was a teenager, where he first met Mike Spearman and Alex Niven and started making music with them.

During his A Levels, Higgs set up the satirical website "Edexhell", which mocked the poor quality of exam papers issued by Edexcel that had affected his grades, and launched a campaign to have the board's accreditation withdrawn by the Qualifications and Curriculum Authority. No further legal action against the board was taken after Higgs' grades were eventually corrected upon appeal.

=== Musical career and Everything Everything ===
Higgs went on to study Popular Music and Recording at Salford University, where the Everything Everything line-up became complete. Together with Jeremy Pritchard and Michael Spearman, Higgs and Niven wrote and composed songs for their planned first album.

For the duration of Everything Everything's career, Higgs has directed the vast majority of the band's music videos.

His high-pitched vocals became his trademark in the music world after "Kemosabe"'s release in 2013, a song which won him his first grand music award—the UK Single of the Year at the Music Producers Guild Awards.

Since "Kemosabe", the band have released 22 singles, as well as six LPs and two EPs: Their 2010 album Man Alive, 2015 album Get to Heaven, 2017 album A Fever Dream, 2018 extended play A Deeper Sea, 2020 album Re-Animator, 2021 extended play Supernormal, 2022 album Raw Data Feel, and 2024 album Mountainhead.
