= Music Producers Guild =

Association of music producers in the United Kingdom

Music Producers Guild logo
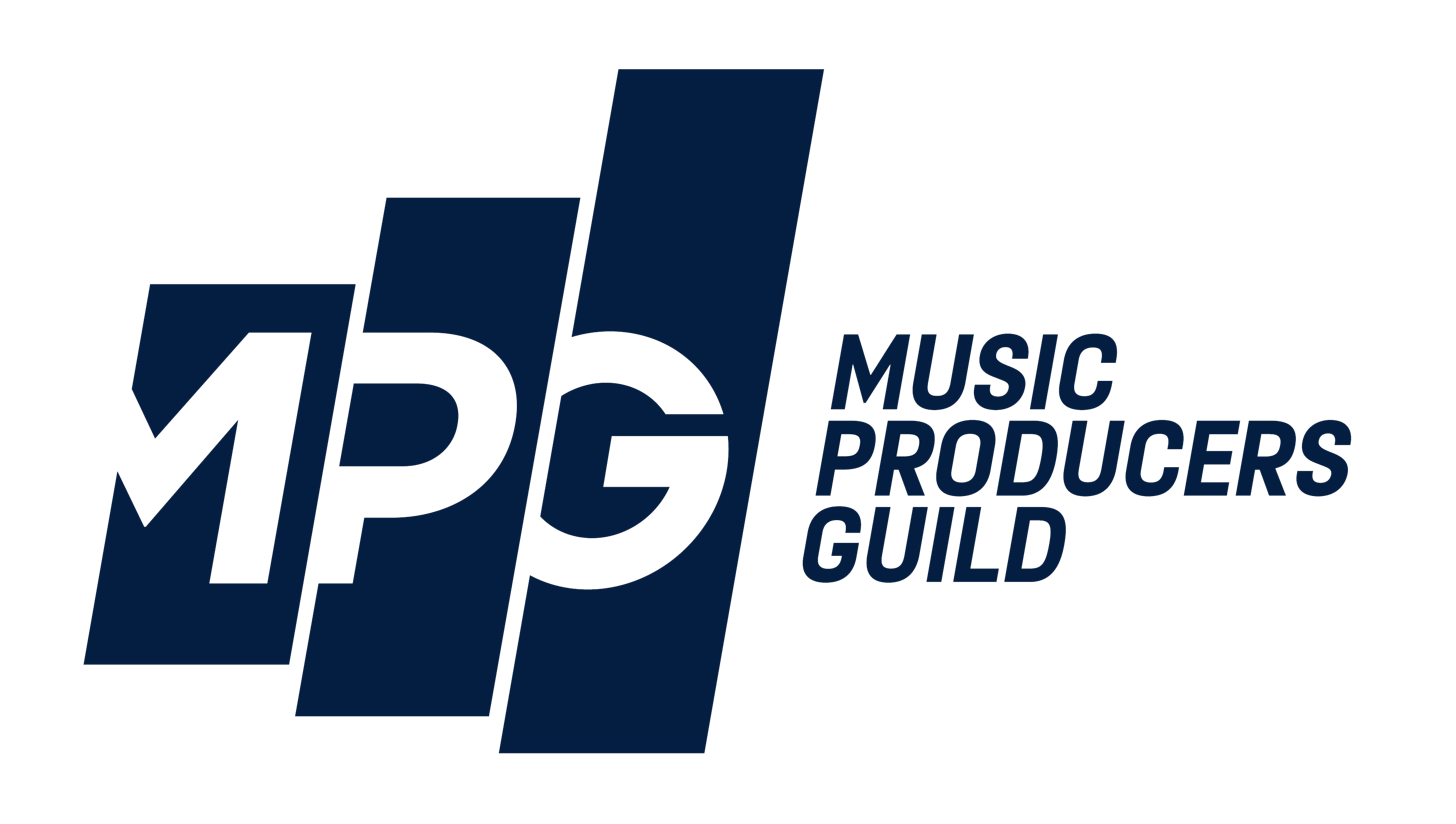
- Industry: Music
- Founded: 2000; 26 years ago
- Headquarters: London, United Kingdom
- Website: mpg.org.uk

The Music Producers Guild (MPG) (UK) promotes and represents individuals in the music production and recording professions. It was founded in 2000. As a guild, the organisation has no political party affiliation.

The organisation presents the Music Producers Guild Awards annually. In 2008, the MPG and BPI coordinated their awards programmes. The MPG awards are intended to recognise producers, engineers, mixers and remixers. At the 2013 MPG awards, George Martin received 'The Outstanding Contribution to UK Music' award.

Membership is open to producers, engineers, mixers, re-mixers, programmers, sound designers, mastering engineers, students, enthusiasts.

MPG members include Paul Epworth, Bernard Butler, Mike Crossey, Henry Arteaga "Teo", Jake Gosling and Tommy D.
