= Eternal Sunshine (song) =

Song by Ariana Grande

from the album Eternal Sunshine
- A-side: "Yes, And?"
- Released: March 8, 2024
- Recorded: 2023
- Studio: Decoy Studios (Woodbridge, UK); Jungle City Studios (New York, NY); MXM Studios (Stockholm, Sweden)
- Genre: R&B; trap-pop
- Length: 3:30
- Label: Republic
- Songwriters: Ariana Grande; Max Martin; Shintaro Yasuda; David Park
- Producers: Ariana Grande; Max Martin; Shintaro Yasuda; Ilya; Davidior

Lyric visualizer
- "Eternal Sunshine" on YouTube

"Eternal Sunshine" is a song by American singer-songwriter Ariana Grande. It was released on March 8, 2024 through Republic Records from her seventh studio album of the same name (2024). It is the fifth track from the album, following "Saturn Returns Interlude". The song was written and produced by Grande, Max Martin, Shintaro Yasuda, Davidior, with additional production from Ilya. The R&B and trap-pop song, deriving its title from the American film Eternal Sunshine of the Spotless Mind (2004), features many lyrical references to the film, including Grande "wiping her mind" of memories.

== Composition ==
"Eternal Sunshine" is three minutes and thirty seconds long. The song is described as a "skittering" and "comforting" mid-tempo R&B and trap song. Grande wrote the song herself and worked alongside Max Martin, Shintaro Yasuda, and David Park with its composition. Yasuda also worked on "Intro (End of the World)" and "The Boy Is Mine", with Park also working on the latter track. Ilya, a long time collaborator of Grande, is featured in the song's production, as well as programming and instrumentation. In an interview for the parent album, Grande mentioned that this was one of the first two songs she wrote for the album's track list, along with the opening track "Intro (End of the World)".

The song transitions from "Saturn Returns Interlude", which ends with the words "wake up" being repeated, alluding to increased mental clarity, presumably from a relationship. Lyrically, Grande is coming to terms with the fate of a past relationship, listing her personal grievances to an ex, and alluding to having wiping her mind of the relationship. There are many references to the film of the same name with Grande labeling her ex as her own "eternal sunshine". The song's lyrics also mentions the Atari video game console, including an 8-bit sound effect in the production. The bridge of the song interpolates "Just for Now" by Imogen Heap.

== Music video ==
"Eternal Sunshine" was featured briefly in the short film Brighter Days Ahead (2025), directed by Grande and Christian Breslauer, the latter of whom worked on other videos of the parent album.

The visual for the song was included as a memory, focusing on the career of Grande's character as a singer. Grande is seen standing on a circular platform surrounded by a galaxy backdrop. The song starts during the song's bridge, where Grande is creating vocal loop arrangements with a looping station. She is using a BOSS RC-505 loop machine, similar to her live performance of "Positions". After the second chorus, she ends the performance, going into "Dandelion".

== Credits ==
Recording

- Mixed at Mixstar Studios (Virginia Beach)
- Mastered at Sterling Sound (New York City)

Personnel

- Ariana Grande – vocals, lyrics, composition, production
- Max Martin – production, composition, drums, keyboards, bass, programming, background vocals
- Ilya Salmanzadeh – production, composition, drums, keyboards, bass, programming, background vocals
- Shintaro Yasuda – production, composition, keyboards, drums, programming
- Davidior – production, composition, drums, programming
- Sam Holland – engineering
- Lou Carrao – engineering
- Eric Eylands – engineering assistance
- Rob Sellens – engineering assistance
- Randy Merrill – mastering
- Serban Ghenea – mixing
- Bryce Bordone – mixing assistance

== Charts ==
Chart performance for "Eternal Sunshine"
Chart (2024)	Peak position
Australia (ARIA)	22
Brazil Hot 100 (Billboard)	81
Canada Hot 100 (Billboard)	23
France (SNEP)	75
Global 200 (Billboard)	13
Greece International (IFPI)	20
New Zealand (Recorded Music NZ)	25
Poland (Polish Streaming Top 100)	85
Portugal (AFP)	35
Sweden Heatseeker (Sverigetopplistan)	13
UK Streaming (OCC)	25
US Billboard Hot 100	23

== Certifications ==
Certifications for "Eternal Sunshine"
Region	Certification	Certified units/sales
Australia (ARIA)	Gold	35,000^{‡}
Brazil (Pro-Música Brasil)	2× Platinum	80,000^{‡}
Canada (Music Canada)	Gold	40,000^{‡}
New Zealand (RMNZ)	Gold	15,000^{‡}
United Kingdom (BPI)	Silver	200,000^{‡}
United States (RIAA)	Platinum	1,000,000^{‡}
^{‡} Sales+streaming figures based on certification alone.
