= Jeff Cronenweth =

American cinematographer

- Born: January 14, 1962 (age 64); Los Angeles, California, U.S.
- Education: USC School of Cinematic Arts
- Years active: 1984–present
- Organization(s): Academy of Motion Picture Arts and Sciences; American Society of Cinematographers
- Parent: Jordan Cronenweth

Jeffrey Scott Cronenweth, ASC (born January 14, 1962) is an American cinematographer known for his work in music videos and his collaboration with filmmaker David Fincher. He has received nominations for two Academy Awards, a BAFTA Award and a Primetime Emmy Award.

Born in Los Angeles, California, and son of the influential cinematographer Jordan Cronenweth, he studied at the USC School of Cinematic Arts. He worked in music videos before transitioning to film with his debut being the David Fincher film Fight Club (1999). He went on to collaborate with him on three more films The Social Network (2010), The Girl with the Dragon Tattoo (2011), and Gone Girl (2014), the former two earning him nominations for the Academy Award for Best Cinematography. He has also worked with filmmakers Kathryn Bigelow, Joseph Kosinski and Aaron Sorkin.

On television, he filmed an episode of the science fiction series Tales from the Loop for which he was Primetime Emmy Award nominated. He has filmed numerous music videos for artists such as Nine Inch Nails, Michael Jackson, Janet Jackson, David Bowie, Alanis Morissette, Christina Aguilera, Shakira, Taylor Swift, and Lady Gaga. He won an MTV Video Music Award for Macy Gray: Do Something (2000).

== Early life and education ==
Born in Los Angeles, California, and son of the influential cinematographer Jordan Cronenweth, he graduated at the USC School of Cinematic Arts. Jeff Cronenweth started working with his father as a camera loader/2nd assistant camera while in high-school. He then worked as 1st assistant camera and camera operator until the mid-1990s.

== Career ==
He was able to work as director of photography for the first time in David Fincher's Fight Club. After working again with Fincher in three more projects, Cronenweth earned two nominations for the Academy Award for Best Cinematography.

== Style and recognition ==
Cronenweth is known for his use of light (or the absence thereof) and composition to elegantly weave a visual language throughout a story as shown in his work on Fight Club, The Social Network, The Girl with the Dragon Tattoo, and Gone Girl and including many of the iconic music videos and commercials he has photographed. On filming Fight Club, Cronenweth stated: "Whether we were inside or outside, we always wanted to embrace depth of field or the lack of as a key story telling element in guiding an audiences focus on what we wanted them to embrace."

In addition, Jeff and his brother Tim (known as "The Cronenweths") have worked as a director/DP team, doing numerous commercials and music videos in and out of Los Angeles. In 2004, he was invited to join the cinematographers branch of the Academy of Motion Picture Arts and Sciences.

== Filmography ==
=== Film ===
Year	Title	Director	Notes
1999	Fight Club	David Fincher	
2002	One Hour Photo	Mark Romanek	
2002	K-19: The Widowmaker	Kathryn Bigelow	
2003	Down with Love	Peyton Reed	
2010	The Social Network	David Fincher	
2011	The Girl with the Dragon Tattoo	David Fincher	
2012	Hitchcock	Sacha Gervasi	
2014	Gone Girl	David Fincher	
2018	A Million Little Pieces	Sam Taylor-Johnson	
2021	Being the Ricardos	Aaron Sorkin	
2025	Tron: Ares	Joachim Rønning	
2026	Melania	Brett Ratner	Documentary; with Barry Peterson and Dante Spinotti
2026	The Social Reckoning	Aaron Sorkin	
2026	The Further Mis-Adventures of Cliff Booth	David Fincher	Additional photography
TBA	Tyrant †	David Weil	Post-production

=== Short film ===
Year	Title	Director
2025	Brighter Days Ahead	Christian Breslauer and Ariana Grande

=== Television ===
Year	Title	Director	Note
2020	Tales from the Loop	Mark Romanek	Episode: "Loop"

=== Music video ===
Year	Title	Artist(s)	Director
1990	"Freedom! '90"	George Michael	David Fincher
1994	"Sly"	Massive Attack	Stéphane Sednaoui
1995	"Daddy's Home"	Montell Jordan	Daniel Zirilli
1996	"Kreep"	Chino XL	Nancy Bennett
1996	"Novocaine for the Soul"	Eels	Mark Romanek
1997	"The Perfect Drug"	Nine Inch Nails	Mark Romanek
1997	"Got 'Til It's Gone"	Janet Jackson feat. Q-Tip and Joni Mitchell	Mark Romanek
1999	"Do Something"	Macy Gray	Mark Romanek
1999	"So Pure"	Alanis Morissette	
1999	"She's All I Ever Had"	Ricky Martin	Nigel Dick
1999	"That's the Way It Is"	Celine Dion	Liz Friedlander
2000	"I Want You to Need Me"	Celine Dion	Liz Friedlander
2000	"Independent Women"	Destiny's Child	Francis Lawrence
2001	"You Rock My World"	Michael Jackson	Paul Hunter
2002	"Outtathaway!"	The Vines	David LaChapelle
2003	"The Voice Within"	Christina Aguilera	David LaChapelle
2003	"It's My Life"	No Doubt	David LaChapelle
2005	"La Tortura"	Shakira feat. Alejandro Sanz	Michael Haussman
2008	"Rock with U"	Janet Jackson	Saam Farahmand
2008	"Love in this Club"	Usher	Greg and Colin Strause
2009	"Boom Boom Pow"	The Black Eyed Peas	Mathew Cullen
2013	"Just Give Me a Reason"	Pink feat. Nate Ruess	Diane Martel
2013	"The Stars (Are Out Tonight)"	David Bowie	Floria Sigismondi
2013	"The Next Day"	David Bowie	Floria Sigismondi
2014	"Shake It Off"	Taylor Swift	Mark Romanek
2017	"Chained to the Rhythm"	Katy Perry feat. Skip Marley	Mathew Cullen
2019	"Walk Me Home"	Pink	Michael Gracey
2019	"Memories"	Maroon 5	David Dobkin
2020	"Smile"	Katy Perry	Mathew Cullen
2020	"911"	Lady Gaga	Tarsem Singh
2022	"Hold My Hand"	Lady Gaga	Joseph Kosinski

== Awards and nominations ==
Organizations	Year	Category	Work	Result
Academy Awards	2010	Best Cinematography	The Social Network	Nominated
Academy Awards	2011	Best Cinematography	The Girl with the Dragon Tattoo	Nominated
American Society of Cinematographers	2010	Outstanding Cinematography	The Social Network	Nominated
American Society of Cinematographers	2011	Outstanding Cinematography	The Girl with the Dragon Tattoo	Nominated
American Society of Cinematographers	2026	Outstanding Cinematography in Music Video	"Supernatural"	Nominated
BAFTA Awards	2011	Best Cinematography	The Girl with the Dragon Tattoo	Nominated
Chicago Film Critics Association	2010	Best Cinematography	The Social Network	Nominated
MTV Video Music Awards	1997	Best Cinematography in a Video	Eels: Novocaine for the Soul	Nominated
MTV Video Music Awards	1997	Best Cinematography in a Video	Nine Inch Nails: The Perfect Drug	Nominated
MTV Video Music Awards	2000	Best Cinematography in a Video	Macy Gray: Do Something	Won
MTV Video Music Awards	2004	Best Cinematography in a Video	Christina Aguilera: The Voice Within	Nominated
MTV Video Music Awards	2004	Best Cinematography in a Video	No Doubt: It's My Life	Nominated
MTV Video Music Awards	2021	Best Cinematography in a Video	Lady Gaga: 911	Nominated
MTV Video Music Awards	2025	Best Cinematography in a Video	Ariana Grande: Brighter Days Ahead	Nominated
Primetime Emmy Awards	2020	Outstanding Cinematography for a Series (One Hour)	Tales from the Loop	Nominated
San Diego Film Critics Society	2014	Best Cinematography	Gone Girl	Nominated
Satellite Award	2014	Best Cinematography	Gone Girl	Nominated
St. Louis Gateway Film Critics Association	2011	Best Cinematography	The Girl with the Dragon Tattoo	Nominated
St. Louis Gateway Film Critics Association	2014	Best Cinematography	Gone Girl	Nominated
Washington D.C. Film Critics Association	2010	Best Cinematography	The Social Network	Nominated
