= Supernatural (Ariana Grande song) =

2025 promotional single by Ariana Grande

Promotional single by Ariana Grande

from the album Eternal Sunshine
- B-side: "Intro (End of the World)" (extended)
- Released: September 4, 2025
- Recorded: 2023
- Studio: Jungle City (New York City); House Mouse (Stockholm)
- Genre: Synth-pop; electropop
- Length: 2:43
- Label: Republic
- Composers: Ariana Grande; Max Martin; Oscar Görres
- Lyricist: Ariana Grande
- Producers: Ariana Grande; Max Martin; Oscar Görres

Ariana Grande promotional singles chronology
"I Don't Know Why (I Just Do)" (2025)	"Supernatural" / "Dandelion" / "Hampstead" (2025)	"For Good" (2025)

Music video
- "Supernatural" on YouTube

"Supernatural" is a song by American singer-songwriter Ariana Grande from her seventh studio album, Eternal Sunshine (2024). She wrote and produced the track with Max Martin and Oscar Görres. Characterized as a synth-pop and electropop ballad with 1980s-inspired production, it explores an intense, consuming infatuation and physical intimacy through themes of possession and astrology. A remix featuring Troye Sivan was released on the album's Slightly Deluxe edition, and the track was issued by Republic Records as a promotional single on September 4, 2025.

Critics commended its lush production and Grande's vocal arrangement, though a few reviewers noted its brevity. The song peaked at number 14 on the Billboard Global 200 and number 17 on the US Billboard Hot 100. It received a platinum certification from the Recording Industry Association of America. Internationally, it reached the top ten in Malaysia and the Philippines, and charted within the top 30 in Australia, Canada, New Zealand, and the United Kingdom. An accompanying music video directed by Christian Breslauer premiered as part of the short film Brighter Days Ahead (2025) before its standalone release. Grande performed "Supernatural" as the closing number of the Eternal Sunshine Tour (2026). The song also went viral on social media platforms in 2025 through the Kim Seon-ho Smile Challenge.

== Background and production ==
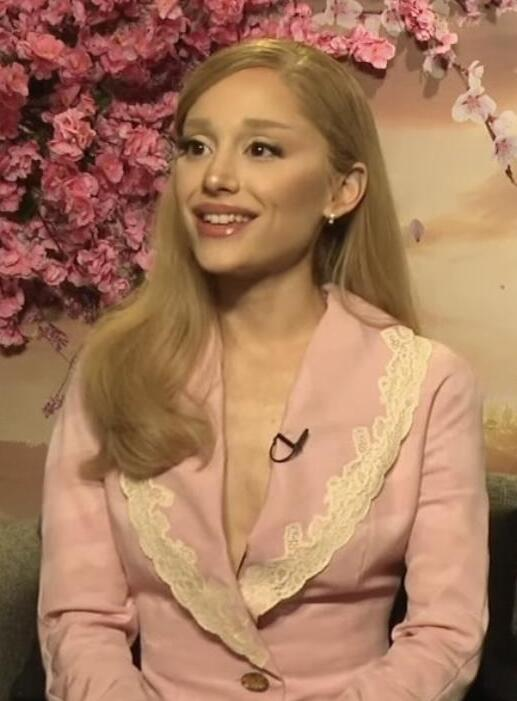
Ariana Grande in 2024.

American singer-songwriter Ariana Grande did not release any studio albums between 2021 and 2023 due to filming commitments for the musical Wicked, which was scheduled for theatrical release in 2024. She announced her seventh studio album in late December 2023, and released "Yes, And?" as its lead single on January 12, 2024. Five days later, Grande confirmed the album's title, Eternal Sunshine, along with its March 8 release date. On February 7, she revealed "Supernatural" as the sixth track on the album via Instagram Reels.

During the 2023 SAG-AFTRA and Writers Guild of America strikes, production on Wicked was put on hold; Grande went to New York City to spend a week collaborating with record producer Max Martin. Providing lyrics as well as background and lead vocals, she wrote and produced "Supernatural" with Martin and Oscar Görres. Martin and Görres handled programming and keyboards, while the latter contributed percussion, bass, guitar, and background vocals. The track was recorded at Jungle City Studios in New York City and House Mouse in Stockholm, Sweden, engineered by Sam Holland and Lou Carrao, assisted by Eric Eylands. The track was mixed by Serban Ghenea and mixing engineer Bryce Bordone at MixStar Studios in Virginia Beach, Virginia, and mastered by Randy Merrill at Sterling Sound in Edgewater, New Jersey. Behind-the-scenes footage of Grande crafting the chorus melody in the studio was released on Instagram in July 2024.

== Music and lyrics ==
Critics characterized "Supernatural" as an uptempo synth-pop and electropop ballad. It is written in F minor and uses arpeggiators, bass synths, and a snare drum sound that falls behind the beat. Moses Jeanfrancois of Beats Per Minute compared its 1980s-inspired rhythm to Grande's prior collaborations with The Weeknd. Michael Cragg of The Observer noted her experimentation with "melodies as sharp as cut glass", and Thomas H. Green of The Arts Desk described the production as "wispy" and "luscious". Other reviewers identified Grande's vocal layering in the chorus, a cycle of fifths preceding the final refrain, and the ascending vocal outro.

Deemed "the horniest" track on Eternal Sunshine by Grande, it incorporates themes of possession and astrology; Vulture critic Craig Jenkins compared the former to attraction. The song explores an intense romance that feels unnatural and completely controls her heart. The singer expresses an overwhelming infatuation through the repeated line, "This love's possessing me, but I don't mind at all", and shows her helplessness with "It's takin' over me, don't wanna fight the fall." The theme later shifts toward physical intimacy: "Boy, let's go too far. Need your hands all up on my body." Publications interpreted these lyrics as an allusion to Grande's relationship with American actor Ethan Slater.

== Release and commercial performance ==
"Supernatural" was released on March 8, 2024, as a track on Eternal Sunshine. A remix with Australian singer Troye Sivan was included on the album's Slightly Deluxe edition on March 11, and a live rendition was later issued on the Slightly Deluxe and Also Live edition on October 1. The accompanying music video, directed by Christian Breslauer, premiered on March 28, 2025, as part of the 26-minute short film Brighter Days Ahead. Released as a standalone video on May 19, it depicts Grande walking through the debris of a burning city in a cream silk dress, approaching an unidentified flying object (UFO), and being beamed upward after stopping beneath it. On September 4, Republic Records issued the track as a promotional single across digital download, streaming, and 7-inch vinyl formats; the digital release was bundled as a five-track package, and the vinyl edition included an extended version of "Intro (End of the World)" as its B-side.

The song debuted at its peak of number 14 on the Billboard Global 200 chart dated March 23, 2024. That same week, it opened at number 17 on the US Billboard Hot 100 and later earned a platinum certification from the Recording Industry Association of America (RIAA) for exceeding one million equivalent units. Internationally, the track reached the top ten in the Philippines (number six) and Malaysia (number ten), and charted at number 18 in Australia, number 20 in Singapore, number 24 in New Zealand, and number 27 in Canada. It was certified platinum in Australia, gold in Canada and New Zealand, and silver in the United Kingdom. Through her promotional hotline in March 2025, Grande described "Supernatural" as the "hit that got away" from Eternal Sunshine, and noted its strong reception among fans even though it was never released as a single.

== Critical reception ==
"Supernatural" received generally positive reviews upon the release of Eternal Sunshine. Thomas H. Green of The Arts Desk noted that Grande's vocals and persona complemented the production. In The Line of Best Fit, David Cobbald highlighted the song as the album's "shining star" and a "classic" Grande pop track, commending its "intricate" vocals and arrangements that would "keep keen musicians happy". Writing for Dork, Dan Harrison appreciated how the track balanced melodic appeal with introspective, personal lyricism.

Billboard's Kyle Denis ranked "Supernatural" eighth among the album's tracks, writing that Grande's vocals on the final chorus—deemed "absolute pop bliss"—helped overcome the song's minor shortcomings. Thomas Phelan of Still Listening called it an effortlessly radiant track anchored by warm, muffled beats and effervescent production. Reviewing the reissue edition, New Wave Magazine writer Aswan Magumbe called the song "a testament to [Grande's] growth as a vocal producer" and wrote that it showed her "in all her loop-machine glory".

Several critics noted its lack of development, including Ryan Bulbeck of Renowned for Sound, who nevertheless deemed it "entertaining" enough to hold the listener's attention throughout. The New York Times critic Lindsay Zoladz considered it "relatively stiff" and one of the album's "weaker" entries. While Billboard's Kristen S. Hé and Andrew Unterberger felt the original was too brief and underwritten to achieve a satisfying climax, they lauded the Troye Sivan remix for adding weight and displaying the duo's vocal chemistry. In a separate review for the same publication, Denis found the repetition of the "it's like supernatural" hook "grating".

== Live performances and usage ==
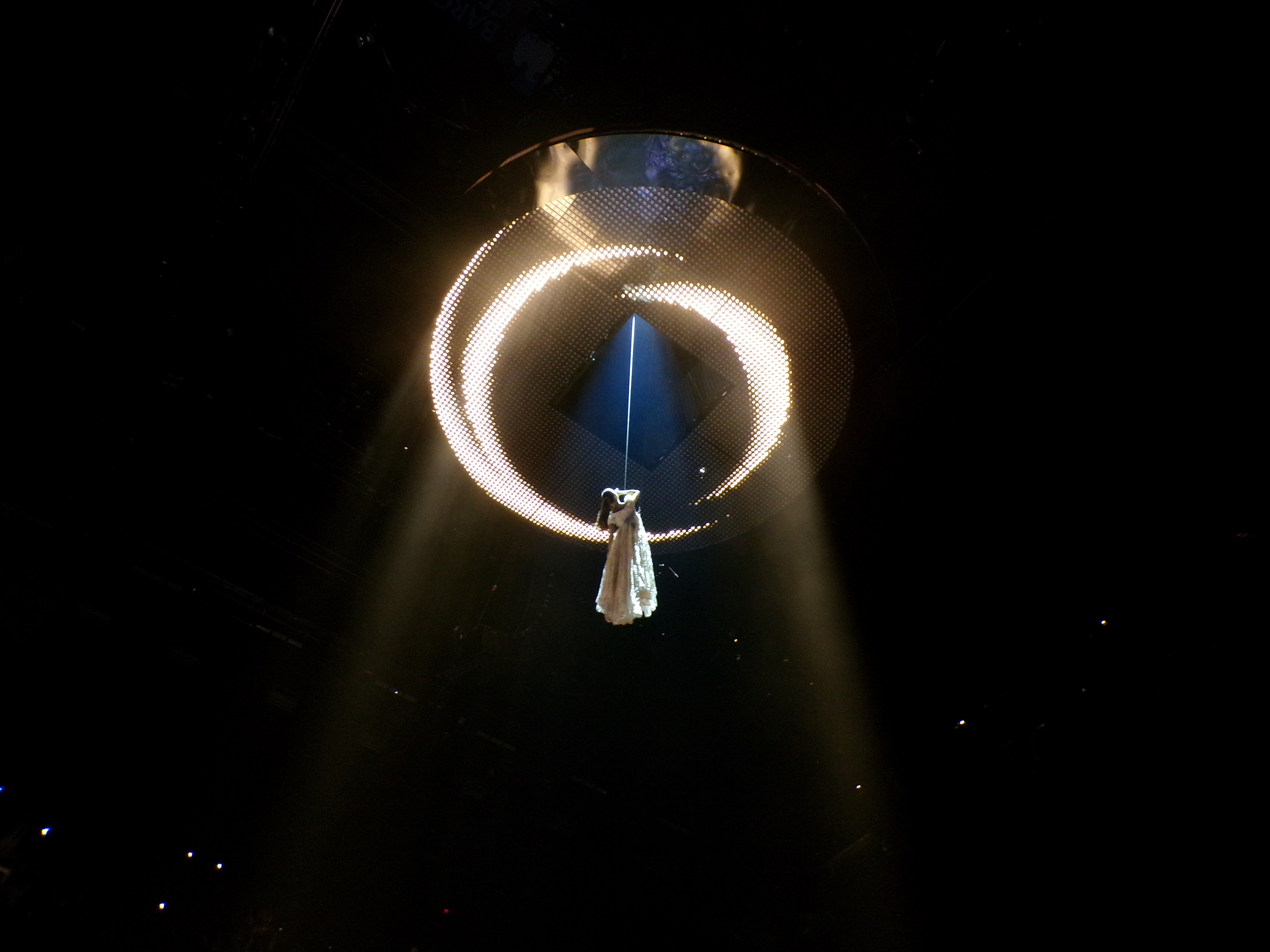
Grande performing "Supernatural" as she is lifted into the air during the Eternal Sunshine Tour.

Grande performed "Supernatural" as the closing song of the Eternal Sunshine Tour (2026), wearing a white floral maxi dress designed by Sarah Burton for Givenchy. During the performance, dancers surrounded her on the B-stage while she was secured in a harness rig that lifted her toward a UFO-shaped set piece suspended above the arena. This recreated the cover art of Eternal Sunshine Deluxe: Brighter Days Ahead, the 2025 deluxe reissue of Eternal Sunshine. Backstage, Grande described the experience as "fun", "nice", and "wonderful", noting that crew members tapped her hip once each side was secured before she took flight.

In 2025, "Supernatural" went viral on social media platforms through the Kim Seon-ho Smile Challenge, which originated from a scene featuring South Korean actor Kim Seon-ho and actress IU in the Netflix series When Life Gives You Tangerines. Recognizing the song's virality, Grande posted a compilation of the edits in May 2025 to thank her audience.

== Track listing ==
- Digital download and streaming
  1. "Supernatural" – 2:43
  2. "Supernatural" (with Troye Sivan) – 2:43
  3. "Supernatural" (live version) – 2:43
  4. "Supernatural" (a cappella) – 2:43
  5. "Supernatural" (instrumental) – 2:43
- 7-inch vinyl
  1. "Supernatural" – 2:43
  2. "Intro (End of the World)" (extended) – 2:41

== Credits and personnel ==
The credits are from the liner notes of the "Supernatural" 7-inch vinyl single.

=== Locations ===
- Recorded at Jungle City Studios (New York City) and House Mouse (Stockholm)
- Mixed at MixStar Studio (Virginia Beach, Virginia)
- Mastered at Sterling Sound (Edgewater, New Jersey)

=== Credits ===
- Ariana Grande – vocals, songwriter, producer, lyricist, background vocals
- Max Martin – songwriter, producer, programmer, keyboardist
- Oscar Görres – songwriter, producer, programmer, keyboardist, percussionist, bassist, guitarist, background vocals
- Sam Holland – audio engineer
- Lou Carrao – audio engineer
- Eric Eylands – assistant audio engineer
- Serban Ghenea – mixer
- Bryce Bordone – mixing engineer
- Randy Merrill – mastering engineer

== Charts ==
=== Weekly charts ===
Weekly chart performance for "Supernatural"
Chart (2024–2025)	Peak position
Australia (ARIA)	18
Brazil Hot 100 (Billboard)	91
Canada Hot 100 (Billboard)	27
France (SNEP)	74
Global 200 (Billboard)	14
Greece International (IFPI)	26
Indonesia (Billboard)	19
Malaysia (Billboard)	17
Malaysia International (RIM)	10
Middle East and North Africa (IFPI)	16
New Zealand (Recorded Music NZ)	24
Philippines (IFPI)	8
Philippines (Philippines Hot 100)	6
Portugal (AFP)	29
Singapore (RIAS)	20
Spain (PROMUSICAE)	92
Sweden Heatseeker (Sverigetopplistan)	4
UK Singles Sales (OCC)	17
UK Streaming (OCC)	20
US Billboard Hot 100	17

=== Year-end charts ===
Year-end chart performance for "Supernatural"
Chart (2025)	Position
Philippines (Philippines Hot 100)	54

== Certifications ==
Certifications for "Supernatural"
Region	Certification	Certified units/sales
Australia (ARIA)	Platinum	70,000^{‡}
Brazil (Pro-Música Brasil)	3× Platinum	120,000^{‡}
Canada (Music Canada)	Gold	40,000^{‡}
New Zealand (RMNZ)	Gold	15,000^{‡}
United Kingdom (BPI)	Silver	200,000^{‡}
United States (RIAA)	Platinum	1,000,000^{‡}
^{‡} Sales+streaming figures based on certification alone.

== Release history ==
Release dates and formats for "Supernatural"
Region	Date	Format(s)	Label	Ref.
Various	September 4, 2025	Digital download; streaming	Republic	
United States	September 4, 2025	7-inch vinyl	Republic	
