= Eternal Sunshine (album) =

- Standard cover (Note: On digital platforms and limited direct-to-consumer physical editions)

Studio album by Ariana Grande
- Released: March 8, 2024
- Recorded: September – December 2023
- Studios: Jungle City (New York City); MXM (Stockholm); Studio 112 (Jonstorp); Decoy (Suffolk); House Mouse (Stockholm)
- Genres: Pop; R&B; electropop
- Length: 35:26
- Label: Republic
- Producers: Ariana Grande; Max Martin; Ilya; Davidior; Aaron Paris; Shintaro Yasuda; Nick Lee; Will Loftis; Luka Kloser; Oscar Görres

Ariana Grande chronology
Positions (2020)	Eternal Sunshine (2024)	Wicked: The Soundtrack (2024)

Singles from Eternal Sunshine
- 1. "Yes, And?" Released: January 12, 2024; 2. "We Can't Be Friends (Wait for Your Love)" Released: March 8, 2024; 3. "The Boy Is Mine" Released: June 7, 2024

Eternal Sunshine (stylized in all lowercase) is the seventh studio album by American singer and songwriter Ariana Grande, released by Republic Records on March 8, 2024. Written and produced by Grande, Max Martin, Ilya Salmanzadeh, and Oscar Görres amongst others, Eternal Sunshine is a pop, R&B, and electropop record with dance and house influences, characterized by mid-tempo synthesizers, subtle guitar, and string elements.

Grande derived the title from the American film Eternal Sunshine of the Spotless Mind (2004). She conceived it as a record of both vulnerability and entertainment, inspired by her personal life experiences. It received acclaim from critics for its restrained vocals and music and its emotional vulnerability, while some critiqued the songwriting as unrefined. It was supported by three singles: "Yes, And?", "We Can't Be Friends (Wait for Your Love)", and "The Boy Is Mine". Eternal Sunshine and its singles received three nominations at the 67th Annual Grammy Awards, including Best Pop Vocal Album.

In the United States, Eternal Sunshine opened at number one on the Billboard 200 and charted all of its tracks on the Billboard Hot 100, with the first two singles making Grande the woman with the most number-one debuts and the first woman with two albums to produce multiple number-one debuts on the chart. The album topped the charts across Europe, Asia-Pacific, and the Americas. Grande promoted and discussed it on programs hosted by Zach Sang, Zane Lowe, Penn Badgley, and Sean Evans and was the musical guest of Saturday Night Live on March 9, 2024. She performed its tracks at the 2024 Met Gala and on The Tonight Show Starring Jimmy Fallon.

The standard edition of Eternal Sunshine features spoken words from Grande's maternal grandmother, Marjorie Grande, on "Ordinary Things" and astrologer Diana Garland on "Saturn Returns Interlude". Two extended editions, including remixes featuring Troye Sivan, Mariah Carey, Brandy, and Monica and live versions of several tracks, were released on March 10 and October 1, 2024. A deluxe reissue, Eternal Sunshine Deluxe: Brighter Days Ahead, was released on March 28, 2025, and supported by a short film also titled Brighter Days Ahead. To support the album and its reissue, Grande embarked on the Eternal Sunshine Tour from June to September 2026.

== Background and conception ==
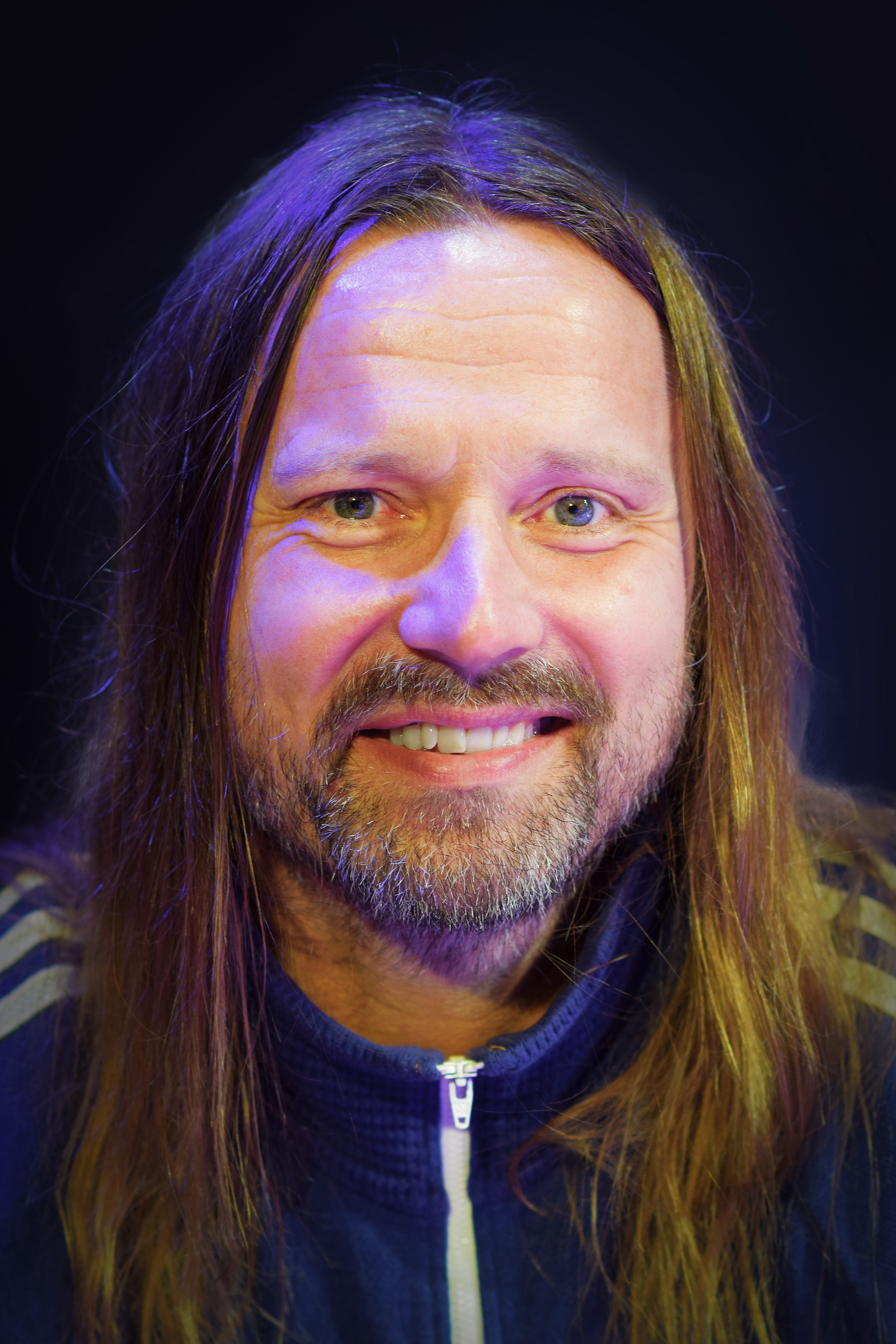
Max Martin produced eleven of the thirteen tracks on Eternal Sunshine.

On May 12, 2022, 19 months after the release of her sixth studio album, Positions (2020), Ariana Grande clarified that she would not be recording another album until she is done filming Wicked (2024) and Wicked: For Good (2025), the two-part film adaptation of the Broadway musical of the same name, in which she portrays the character Glinda. In October 2023, she first jokingly hinted at a forthcoming album by posting "ag7: goat mother" as an Instagram caption. A set of pictures included a photo of her with Swedish producer and long-time collaborator Max Martin at Jungle City Studios in New York City.

On December 7 and December 17, 2023, Grande shared a series of pictures and video clips of her working in recording studios and editing audio files. As opposed to previous eras, she specifically stated that there would be no song snippets for the upcoming record. On December 27, 2023, Grande confirmed a 2024 album release via her social media. She posted a carousel of videos on her Instagram that show her crying in a recording studio and her mother Joan dancing to a new song of hers, amongst others. She captioned the post "See you next year" and tagged several accounts, including Swedish musician Ilya Salmanzadeh, music video director Christian Breslauer, and Republic Records. She referred to the picture of her crying and another one which depicts her dancing as the "two moods of the album". Packages with R.E.M. Beauty's On Your Collar lipstick in the shade "Attention" including a defocused close-up shot of Grande's red lips and the caption of an Instagram post she would make a few days after delivery, were sent to fans. On January 17, 2024, Grande announced the album, its title Eternal Sunshine, and release date via her social media.

Grande described Eternal Sunshine as "kind of a concept album" comprising "different heightened pieces of the same story, of the same experience". She explained that the record spans from "really vulnerable" songs to playful tracks which see her emulating "what people kind of expect me to be sometimes and having fun with it". Wendy Goldstein, co-president of Republic Records, described the record as an "elevated version" of Grande's previous albums, calling it an embodiment of "Sweetener meets ... Thank U, Next".

== Recording and production ==
In a video shared to her social media of her previewing some of Eternal Sunshine's songs to Republic Records personnel, Grande revealed that after the 2023 SAG-AFTRA strike temporarily paused the filming of Wicked and Wicked: For Good, she "came [to the studio]" and began work on the record that September. She further revealed that she worked with Martin for a few weeks and handled production on her own. "Proper" vocal recordings and orchestrations were arranged in November. Work on the album concluded in late December 2023. Referring to the period of making Eternal Sunshine, Grande stated that "things [were] kind of just pouring out and happening very quickly".

== Music and lyrics ==
Eternal Sunshine is a pop, R&B, and electropop album that features elements of dance music, especially house music. Helen Brown of The Independent described it as a "slow-fizz pop" album, consisting of mid-tempo synths, strings, and muted guitar. Jem Aswad of Variety felt that Martin and Salmanzadeh imbued the album with a "very Swedish vibe and structure to the tracks" inspired by classic pop, a style atypical of Anglo-American musicians. Lyrically, the album is a combination of both "ultra-confident and entirely self-deprecating" themes, inspired by Grande's personal relationships. Billboard described it as an introspective record—one in which Grande reflects on herself as she enters her thirties.

=== Songs ===
Eternal Sunshine begins with "Intro (End of the World)", which primarily includes strings and a morose guitar. Grande poses the question, "How can I tell if I'm in the right relationship?", describing her anxieties with her partner and the possibility of its end. The second song, "Bye", was described by Grande as the hardest song on the album for her to write, saying "It was hard for the reason that I desperately didn't want it to sound like a 'fuck you.' I wanted it to sound like, 'I need to leave, so bye.'" Grande wanted it to have a sense of self-awareness and accountability rather than being completely dismissive. It is an uptempo dance-pop number with influences of disco and Philadelphia soul. The third track, "Don't Wanna Break Up Again", is a gloomy, 1990s influenced pop and R&B song that discusses conflicting feelings Grande has towards the end of her relationship with her partner. While referring to it as a "situationship" that she is aware needs to end, the song shows a reluctancy to go through with ending it and describes the steps she went through to try to save it, such as therapy. Rolling Stone described the first three tracks as "seventies pop".

"Saturn Returns Interlude" prominently samples a YouTube video of astrologer Diana Garland as she discusses the importance of the age of 29 in a person's life. She urges the listener to "wake up" and "sort out who you really are". The interlude transitions into the title track, "Eternal Sunshine", during which Grande seems to come to terms with the faults of her partner and their relationship. In the track, she hints that her ex-husband, Dalton Gomez, may have cheated during their marriage and displays an uncertainty towards their relationship over an "R&B-pop" beat. "Supernatural", the sixth track, has a low-tempo beat with lyrics about how Grande is in love with someone and is inseparable. She lets this love take over her entire state of mind. The lyrics also show that Grande is healing from heartbreak and is ready to love again. Billboard ranked "Supernatural" number eight out of Eternal Sunshine's tracks and compared it to "Breathin" from Sweetener, as both are "undeniable home runs and surefire pure-pop smashes".

The seventh and eighth tracks, "True Story" and "The Boy Is Mine", were intentionally placed together in the track list and are both described as R&B songs echoing music from the 1990s and 2000s. Grande described the former as "an untrue story based on all untrue events"; it sees her address the press who create rumors and "pray for her demise" for fun. It is a mid-tempo R&B track with a "slinky bounce" and elements of G-funk in its production. The latter song is a "bass-heavy" R&B song with lyrics about being infatuated with a man Grande believes she is destined to be with. It is an "elevated version" of "Fantasize"—a leaked track that garnered positive fan reactions—and a "reimagining" of Brandy and Monica's "The Boy Is Mine" (1998). The ninth track and lead single, "Yes, And?", is an uptempo and "effervescent" pop-house song with elements of ballroom in its production. Following "Yes, And?" is "We Can't Be Friends (Wait for Your Love)", which served as the second single. The synth-wave influenced synth-pop song has been described as having a double meaning, with Grande speaking about a past lover and her relationship with the press.

"I Wish I Hated You", the eleventh track, is a vulnerable and honest ballad that sees Grande confessing that she wishes her partner was worse to her so she can find closure and move on. It features a minimalistic electro-pop production. The penultimate track, "Imperfect for You", is an alternative rock ballad inspired by the "organic sound" of the Beatles' Rubber Soul. Grande described the track as an ode to friends, family, and loved ones who are "accepting and real". The chord progression featured on the song was developed by Martin in the 1990s. The closer, "Ordinary Things", is a mid-tempo ballad prominently featuring horns. The lyrics center on struggling to find beauty in the ordinary moments of a relationship. The song closes with a voice note from Grande's grandmother, Marjorie "Nonna" Grande, where she reflects on being madly in love with her husband, and although they argued as couples normally do, they were both willing to reconcile. The spoken-word outro answers the question Grande posed in the opening track: "Never go to bed without kissing goodnight ... And if you can't, and if you don't feel comfortable doing it, you're in the wrong place, get out."

== Release and promotion ==
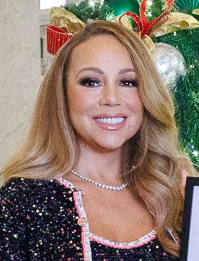
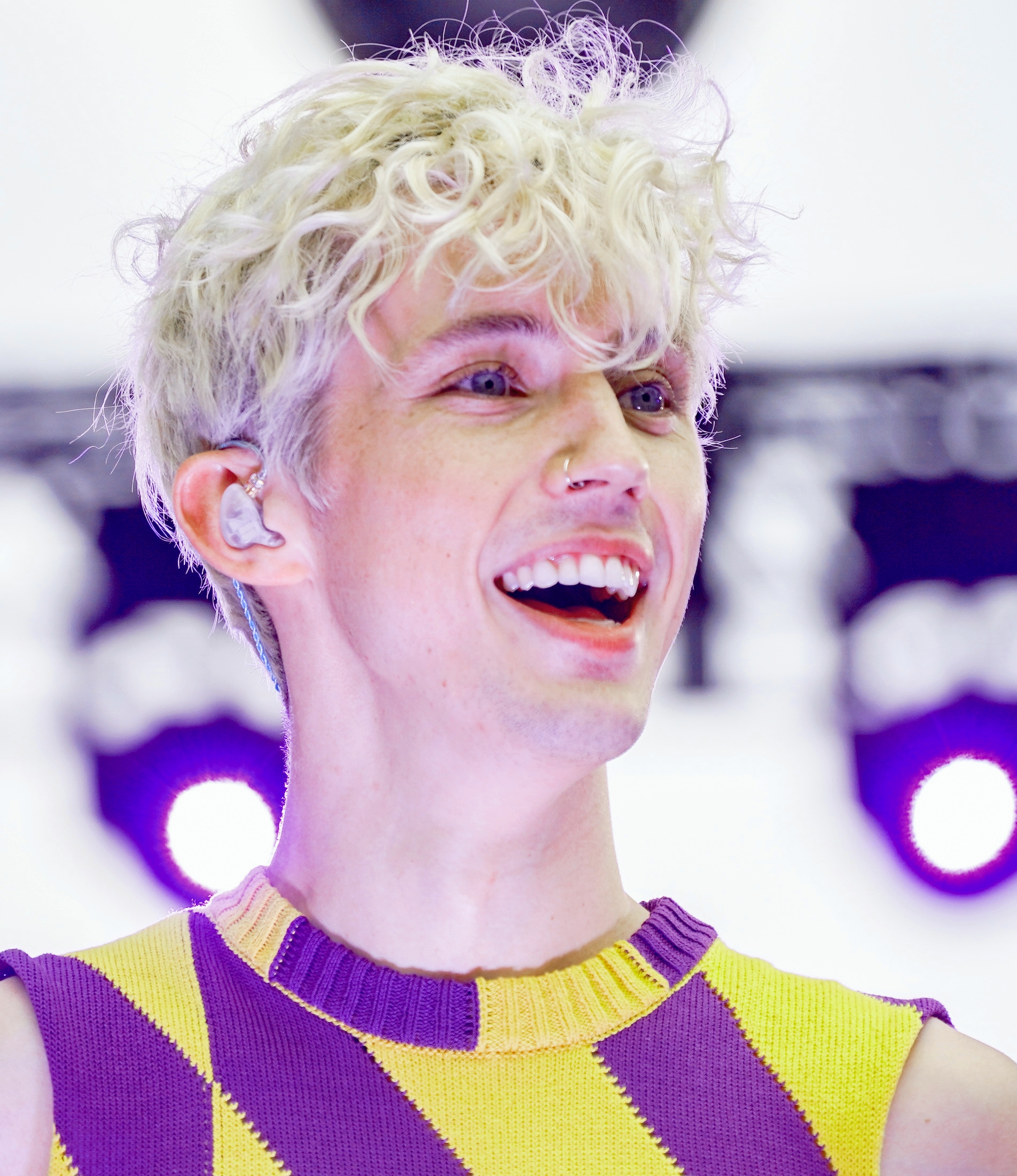
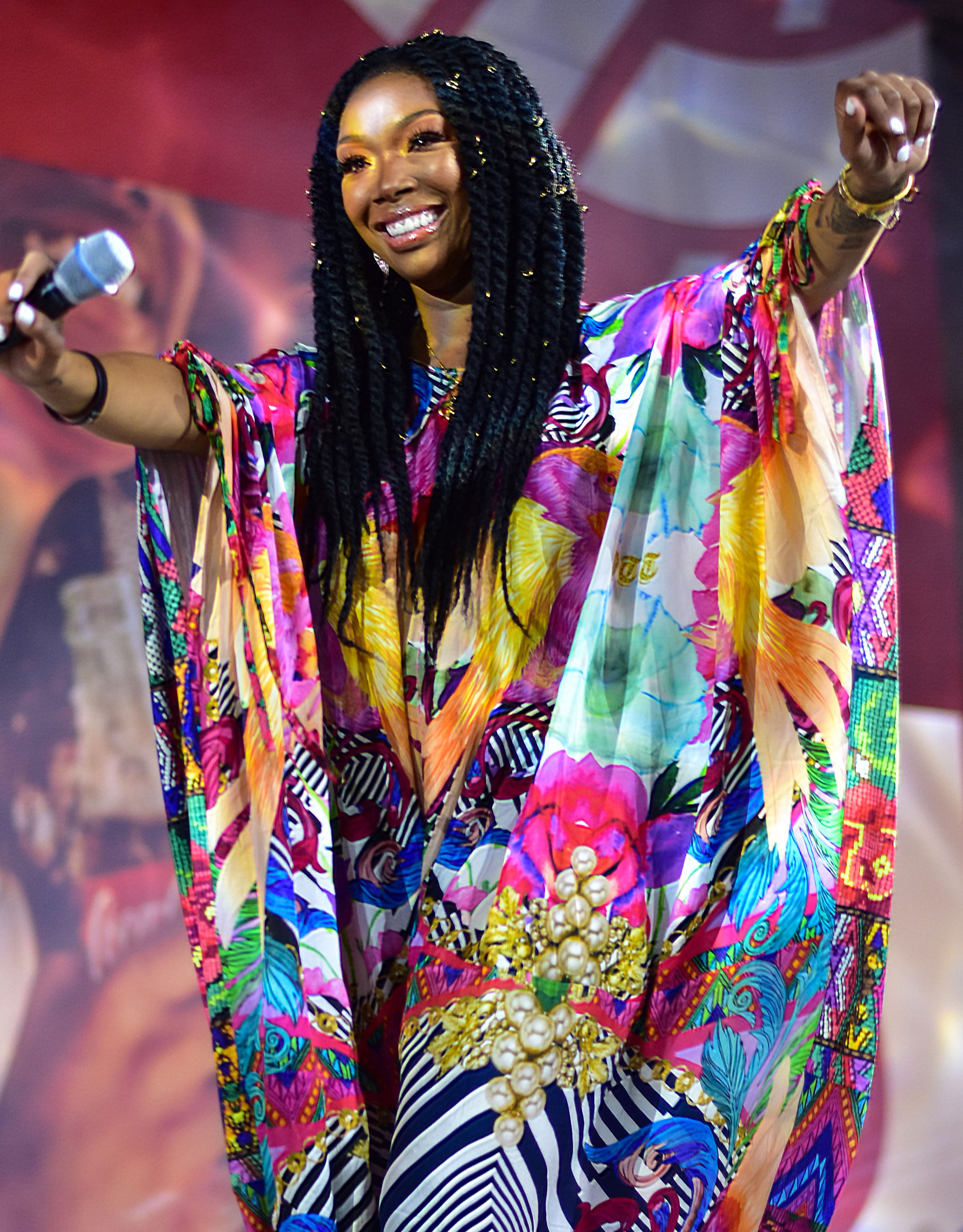
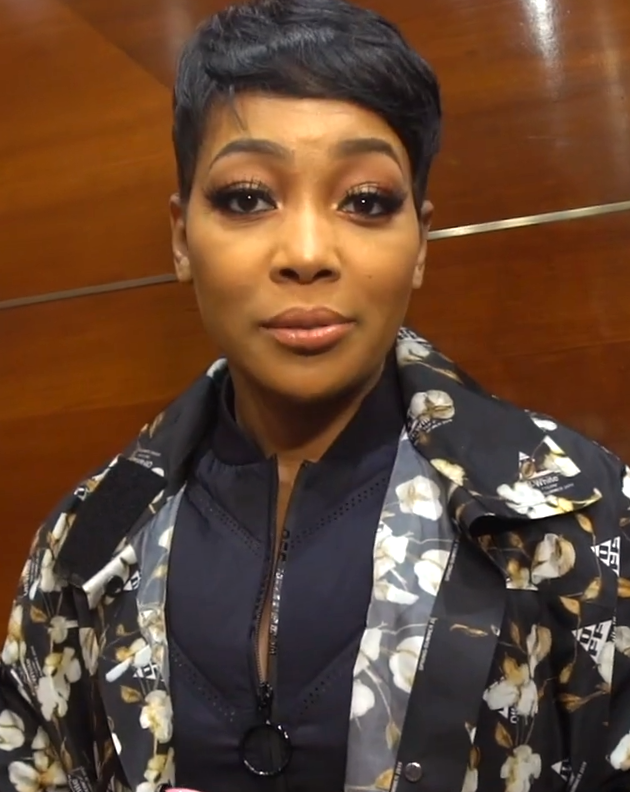
Mariah Carey, Troye Sivan (top, L–R), Brandy, and Monica (bottom, L–R) appear on remixes included in the Slightly Deluxe and Slightly Deluxe and Also Live editions.

Republic Records released Eternal Sunshine on March 8, 2024. It was issued via streaming, download, five CD variants, and six vinyl LP variants. Pre-orders began on January 17, the day the album was announced. On March 10, a digital extended edition, titled Slightly Deluxe, was surprise-released via Grande's webstore; it features four bonus tracks, including a remix of "Supernatural" with Troye Sivan and the pre-released Mariah Carey remix of "Yes, And?". The Slightly Deluxe edition was released to streaming services the day after. On October 1, 2024, Grande surprise-released another digital extended edition, labeled Slightly Deluxe and Also Live. It comprises the standard thirteen tracks, the Slightly Deluxe remixes, the pre-released Brandy and Monica remix of "The Boy Is Mine", and live versions of seven songs.

=== Marketing ===
The tracklist was not unveiled entirely at once. Grande revealed song titles and their track order on separate days, starting on January 27, 2024, with tracks 1, 5, and "Yes, And?" as track 9. Tracks 2, 6, and 10 were revealed on February 7, followed by tracks 3, 7, and 11 on February 17, and tracks 4, 8, 12, and 13 on February 27. Additionally, Grande revealed some lyrics from the album via her social media on February 27. A teaser, featuring the singer at a photo shoot for one of the cover artworks, was released on March 6, 2024.

Grande appeared on the Zach Sang Show on Amazon Music for a double-episode interview to discuss Eternal Sunshine. The first episode was released on February 27, 2024, and was centered around the creative process. The second episode was released on March 8, wherein she details each song. Grande was then interviewed by Zane Lowe for Apple Music 1, which was broadcast on March 7. She appeared on The Tonight Show Starring Jimmy Fallon on June 6, 2024, to discuss Wicked (2024) and the third single, "The Boy Is Mine"; it marked her first late-night TV interview since 2021 and eleventh appearance on the show. Grande was the guest for a two-part episode of Penn Badgley's podcast Podcrushed; the first part was released on June 12, followed by the second on June 17. She appeared on an episode of the Shut Up Evan podcast on July 9 and the season 24 finale of web talk show Hot Ones, hosted by Sean Evans, on August 8.

=== Title and artwork ===
The title, Eternal Sunshine, is derived from the film Eternal Sunshine of the Spotless Mind (2004). It stars Jim Carrey, who Grande has expressed she is a fan of and whose show Kidding she had guest-starred on. The title was teased via two Easter eggs. The first was in the opening scene of the music video of "Yes, And?", which depicts a red card with the acronym "AG7" on the frontside and the geographical coordinates 41.0359° N, 71.9545° W—which locate Montauk, New York, a key location of the film. The second was when Grande shared a few lines of Alexander Pope's poem Eloisa to Abelard on her Instagram, including: "Eternal sunshine of the spotless mind!"

Seven cover variants of Eternal Sunshine were issued: a standard vinyl cover, four direct-to-consumer variations via Grande's website, a retail-exclusive CD cover (which also serves as the "Yes, And?" artwork), and a Target-exclusive in the United States. The digital cover depicts the back of Grande's head, with her dressed in a white outfit and her blonde hair styled in a ponytail, resting on the shoulder of a similarly dressed woman that is "a clone of herself". Four covers, including the "Yes, And?" cover, were unveiled with the album's announcement. The remaining three alternate covers were revealed throughout January and February. Through the promotional material of the album, Grande sports a Maison Margiela outfit—a white bodysuit and a pair of red tulle gloves. She stated that the different artworks "capture the emotional ups and downs of the album".

=== Singles ===
Three singles were released from Eternal Sunshine, along with accompanying music videos directed by Christian Breslauer. "Yes, And?" was released on January 12, 2024, via streaming services as the lead single. It was also issued in 7-inch, CD single, and cassette formats. Its accompanying music video was released the same day via Grande's Vevo channel on YouTube. Grande teased the song's title days before release when she was photographed wearing a sweatshirt with it printed on the front. "Yes, And?" debuted atop the Billboard Hot 100, marking Grande's eighth number-one single in the US. It also topped the Global 200, Global Excl. US, and Canadian Hot 100; and reached the top five in numerous countries including Australia, Ireland, New Zealand, and the United Kingdom. Multiple versions and mixes were released, including a remix featuring Mariah Carey in February. It was certified Platinum by the Recording Industry Association of America (RIAA). On February 5, Grande announced that no more pre-release singles would follow "Yes, And?". She explained that she wanted fans to "experience [Eternal Sunshine] in full this time" but confirmed that singles will follow the album's release.

"We Can't Be Friends (Wait for Your Love)" followed as the second single on March 8, 2024. The song was also released via CD, cassette, and 7-inch vinyl. Its music video—which co-starred actor Evan Peters—was described by Grande as her "own short version of [Eternal Sunshine of the Spotless Mind]". The song debuted atop the Billboard Hot 100, marking Grande's ninth chart-topper and seventh number-one debut. With this, Grande surpassed Taylor Swift as the woman with the most number-one debuts on the chart. That record was retaken by Swift just over a month later with her single "Fortnight" (featuring Post Malone). "We Can't Be Friends (Wait for Your Love)" also reached number one on the Global 200 and in six other countries, including New Zealand, Malaysia, and the United Arab Emirates. It became Grande's tenth number-one on the Billboard Pop Airplay chart, where it spent two weeks at the summit. As of September 2024, it is certified double Platinum by the RIAA.

The eighth track on Eternal Sunshine, titled "The Boy Is Mine", went viral on TikTok due to a dance trend associated with the song and received multiple celebrity cosigns online. On May 7, Grande confirmed fans' theories via her Instagram that it would be released as the next single. The music video for the song—co-starring actor Penn Badgley and featuring cameos from Brandy and Monica—was released on June 7, four days before it impacted US contemporary hit radio as the third single. Variety called the music video "theatrical". A remix of the track featuring Brandy and Monica—whose 1998 duet inspired Grande's song—was released on June 21, 2024. Physical editions of the solo and remix versions were released in late July. "The Boy Is Mine" peaked within the top 15 on the Global 200 and Canadian Hot 100 and the top 20 in the US. It was certified Platinum by the RIAA in September 2024. The sixth track, "Supernatural", was released as a promotional single on September 4, 2025.

=== Brighter Days Ahead reissue ===
A deluxe reissue, Eternal Sunshine Deluxe: Brighter Days Ahead, was released on March 28, 2025, via streaming, download, two CD variants, and two vinyl LP variants. The digital version contains the standard thirteen tracks and six bonus tracks, while the physical release also includes the previously released remixes of "Yes, And?", "Supernatural", and "The Boy Is Mine" featuring other artists. On April 1, three download-exclusive variants of the reissue were released via Grande's webstore and on streaming services: an instrumental edition, an a cappella edition, and an alternate cover.

Concurrently with the reissue's release on March 28, a short film also titled Brighter Days Ahead premiered via Grande's YouTube channel. Written and directed by Breslauer and Grande, it is set 70 years after the events of the "We Can't Be Friends (Wait for Your Love)" music video; Grande stars as Peaches, the fictional character introduced in the video. Three songs from the standard edition of Eternal Sunshine and three from the reissue's bonus tracks are featured in the film. Co-produced by London Alley, the Lucky Bastards, Republic Records, and Grande, fan screenings of Brighter Days Ahead were held in Boca Raton, Chicago, Los Angeles, and New York City on March 30.

=== Performances and tour ===
Grande appeared as the musical guest on the March 9, 2024, episode of Saturday Night Live. It marked her third appearance on the show and her first since 2016. She performed "We Can't Be Friends (Wait for Your Love)" and "Imperfect for You". Grande was the surprise performer at the 2024 Met Gala in New York City on May 6, 2024. She performed the first three singles alongside "Into You", "7 Rings", Sleeping Beauty (1959)'s "Once Upon a Dream", and a cover duet of Whitney Houston and Mariah Carey's "When You Believe" (1998) with Cynthia Erivo. Grande was the musical guest for the June 6, 2024, episode of The Tonight Show Starring Jimmy Fallon, where she performed "The Boy Is Mine". Performances of the seven songs that had live renditions on the Slightly Deluxe and Also Live version, with Grande backed by a 10-piece band, were released to her Vevo channel via YouTube from October 1 to 7.

In July 2024, Grande stated on the Shut Up Evan podcast that she planned a "mini sampling of shows" supporting the album, adding that it would be "a really lovely idea to be able to trickle in some shows in between the two Wicked films". Following speculation in December 2024 of an impending announcement of a concert tour for 2025, Republic Records denied rumors and stated that there were "no plans" to tour. Later that month, Grande told Variety that although "music and being on stage will always be a part of [her] life", she would not be touring "anytime soon", prioritising acting for "the next few years". In July 2025, Grande posted a clip of her 2024 Met Gala performance on Instagram, ending the caption by stating that she was "working on a plan to sing for you all next year. Even if it's just for a little."

A concert tour in support of the album, titled the Eternal Sunshine Tour, was announced on August 28, 2025. It consisted of 41 shows across the United States, Canada, and England between June and September 2026.

== Critical reception ==
Professional ratings
Aggregate scores
Source	Rating
AnyDecentMusic?	7.5/10
Metacritic	84/100
Review scores
Source	Rating
AllMusic	4.5/5 stars
Clash	8/10
The Daily Telegraph	4/5 stars
The Guardian	4/5 stars
The Independent	3/5 stars
The Line of Best Fit	7/10
NME	4/5 stars
Pitchfork	7.2/10
Rolling Stone	5/5 stars
Slant Magazine	3.5/5 stars

Upon its release, Eternal Sunshine received critical acclaim. On Metacritic, which assigns a normalized score out of 100 to ratings from professional publications, Eternal Sunshine received a weighted mean score of 84, based on 19 reviews, indicating "universal acclaim". In a rave review, Brittany Spanos of Rolling Stone commended Eternal Sunshine for having "some of the most honest and inventive music of her career" and dubbed the album as an "instant classic". Various other critics, such as NME's Nick Levine, AllMusic's Neil Z. Yeung, Clash's Emma Harrison, The Guardian's Laura Snapes, and The New York Times' Lindsay Zoladz, dubbed it one of Grande's stronger, most sophisticated albums yet, highlighting the perceived maturity of its subject matter.

The album's musical tonality was often complimented. Harry Tafoya of Pitchfork, Moses Jeanfrancois of Beats Per Minute, Jem Aswad of Variety, and Mary Siroky of Consequence emphasized Grande's "raw", subtle and restrained vocals, which they thought focused on texture instead of showcasing her vocal range. Zoladz regarded Eternal Sunshine one of Grande's "texturally consistent" releases. In contrast, Helen Brown of The Independent found this tone rather conversational, lacking "strong melodic snags".

A number of critics offered criticism on the album's songwriting. Poppie Platt of The Daily Telegraph and David Cobbald of The Line of Best Fit regarded the album a "slickly" produced pop record, albeit with some underwhelming tracks and simple lyrics. According to Tafoya, Grande often settles for "stock phrases or scrambles for syllables", while Siroky observed a lack of conceptual focus in the lyrics, and Green claimed some tracks to be insubstantial. In an unfavorable review, Robert Sona of Sputnikmusic blamed the songwriting for making the album an "unambitious" output.

Several reviews praised Martin's production, emphasizing his stylistic influence on Eternal Sunshine. Sona credited Grande's "concise" team of producers—Martin, Salmanzadeh and Davidior—for helping the album feel like "a singular and shapely work of art" unlike Positions. Jeanfrancois considered the sound a return to 1990s' R&B, "something that has been avidly requested" by fans and critics. However, Slant Magazine's Sal Cinquemani agreed with Platt in critiquing the album for not venturing outside Grande's familiar music styles. Eternal Sunshine's perceived status as a "divorce album" sparked divided opinions amongst critics. Snapes described the album as a perceptive, "post-divorce" record. Tafoya opined Eternal Sunshine is not "as cohesive of a divorce record" as Adele's 30 (2021), whereas Jeanfrancois said it is "by no means a divorce album".

=== Year-end lists ===
Select year-end rankings
Publication	List	Rank	Ref.
AllMusic	100 Favorite Albums of 2024	—	
Billboard	The Best 50 Albums of 2024	6	
Cosmopolitan	The Best Albums of 2024	—	
The Hollywood Reporter	The 10 Best Albums of 2024	5	
Los Angeles Times	The 20 Best Albums of 2024	7	
NME	The 50 Best Albums of 2024	24	
People	Top 10 Albums 2024	8	
Rolling Stone	The 100 Best Albums of 2024	8	
Uproxx	The Best Albums of 2024	—	
Variety	Steve J. Horowitz's Top 10 Albums of 2024	1	

== Commercial performance ==
On its release day, Eternal Sunshine received 58.1 million streams on Spotify globally, setting the record for the most-streamed album in a single day in 2024, at the time. All 12 chart-eligible tracks from the album simultaneously appeared on both the Billboard Global 200 and Global Excl. US charts. On the former, 10 tracks appeared within the top-25 region, led by "We Can't Be Friends (Wait for Your Love)", which debuted at number one on both charts, the album's second chart-topper after "Yes, And?". All six bonus tracks from the 2025 reissue appeared simultaneously on the Billboard Global 200 and Global Excl. US charts. On the former, each track appeared within the top-50 region, led by "Twilight Zone", which debuted in the top 10 on both charts.

The International Federation of the Phonographic Industry (IFPI) ranked Eternal Sunshine thirteenth on the Global Album Chart and ninth on the Global Streaming Album Chart for 2024. Aided by the album's commercial success, Grande ranked eleventh on the organization's Global Recording Artist Chart, being the fourth-highest-ranked among female artists.

=== United States ===
Eternal Sunshine opened at number one on the US Billboard 200 with 227,000 album-equivalent units, including 194.92 million on-demand streams and 77,000 album sales in its first week. It marked Grande's sixth number-one album and her third-largest opening week, behind Thank U, Next (360,000 units) and Sweetener (231,000 units). It was the most consumed album of the week, debuting at number one on both Billboard Top Streaming Albums and Top Album Sales charts, marking Grande's sixth chart-topper on the latter. Furthermore, it became her second number-one album on the Billboard Vinyl Albums chart. With 33,000 vinyl sales, Grande had her best vinyl sales week yet, exceeding Positions (32,000). At the time of its release, Eternal Sunshine achieved the largest US sales debut of 2024, surpassing Kanye West and Ty Dolla Sign's Vultures 1 (148,000 units). In its second week, Eternal Sunshine remained at number one with 100,500 units, including 115.05 million on-demand streams and 13,000 album sales, marking Grande's third consecutive album to spend its first two weeks at the top. It slipped to number three in its third week, with 72,000 units. Following the restocking of a signed CD on Grande's webstore, the album rose to number eight on the chart dated July 6, 2024, marking its seventh non-consecutive week within the top-10 region. On September 9, 2024, it was certified Platinum by the RIAA for earning over one million units in the country.

On the Billboard Hot 100 chart issue dated March 23, 2024, all 12 chart-eligible tracks appeared simultaneously, becoming Grande's third consecutive album to do so, following Thank U, Next (12 songs) and Positions (14 songs). Eleven were new entries; ten appeared in the top 40. Grande's career Hot 100 count expanded to 85 entries, tying her with Beyoncé for the third-most among women. The number-one debut of the second single "We Can't Be Friends (Wait for Your Love)" marked Grande's first instance of simultaneously debuting atop both the Billboard 200 and Hot 100 charts. It also made her the first woman to have two albums with multiple number-one debuts in the US, after Thank U, Next (2019). (Note: Thank U, Next (2019) yielded two singles that debuted at number one on the Billboard Hot 100: its title track and "7 Rings".) Additionally, Grande's grandmother, Marjorie Grande, made her first appearance on the Billboard Hot 100 with "Ordinary Things", credited as Nonna; this made Marjorie the oldest act ever to have appeared on the Hot 100, at the age of 98. Its strong chart-performance made Grande ascend to the number-one position on the Billboard Artist 100 chart for the sixteenth non-consecutive week, the sixth-most for any artist since the chart's inception. Furthermore, it also marked Grande's first instance of reaching the top of both the Billboard Hot 100 Songwriters and Hot 100 Producers charts. This made her the fourth artist and second woman ever to top the Artist 100, Hot 100, Billboard 200, Hot 100 Songwriters, and Hot 100 Producers charts simultaneously. She remained at number one on the Hot 100 Songwriters chart for two consecutive weeks.

Following the Brighter Days Ahead reissue, Eternal Sunshine returned to number one on the Billboard 200 for a third non-consecutive week, becoming Grande's longest-running number-one album on the chart. The album earned 137,000 album-equivalent units during the tracking week, including 98.45 million on-demand streams and 61,000 album sales. It boasted the largest positional jump to number one—soaring from 87 to the top spot—since Travis Scott's Days Before Rodeo (106–1). All six tracks from the deluxe edition simultaneously appeared on the Billboard Hot 100 dated April 12, 2025, all within the top-60 region, with "Twilight Zone" leading at number 18. Aided by the reissue's chart performance, Grande returned to number one on the Billboard Artist 100 chart for the seventeenth non-consecutive week.

=== International ===
In the United Kingdom, Eternal Sunshine debuted atop the UK Albums Chart, becoming Grande's fifth consecutive number-one album on the chart. It also opened at number one on the UK Vinyl Albums Chart. With five number one albums each, Grande joined Celine Dion and Lady Gaga as the female artists with the sixth-most number one albums in Britain. It remained at number one for two consecutive weeks. Furthermore, "Yes, And?" and "We Can't Be Friends (Wait for Your Love)" both peaked at number two on the UK Singles Chart. Following the Brighter Days Ahead reissue, Eternal Sunshine rose to number three on the chart. Additionally, "Twilight Zone" debuted at number five on the UK Singles Chart, becoming the album's third top-10 song in the country. The same week, "Intro (End of the World)" and "Dandelion" debuted at numbers 19 and 26, respectively, on the UK Singles Chart. With a total of seven chart entries, Eternal Sunshine became Grande's album with the most entries on the UK Singles Chart. Eternal Sunshine also entered the Irish Albums Chart at number one, marking Grande's fifth consecutive number-one album in Ireland. Following the Brighter Days Ahead reissue, it returned to number one for a second non-consecutive week.

In Canada, Eternal Sunshine debuted atop the Billboard Canadian Albums Chart, earning Grande her fifth number-one album there. It remained at number one for two consecutive weeks. Upon release, all 12 chart-eligible tracks from the album appeared simultaneously on the Canadian Hot 100. "Yes, And?" debuted at number one, becoming Grande's seventh chart-topper, and "We Can't Be Friends (Wait for Your Love)" entered at number three, marking her 23rd top-10 hit in the country. On Luminate's 2024 midyear music report, Eternal Sunshine ranked as the tenth-best-selling album of the year as of July with 91,000 total album-equivalent units, which consisted of 6,000 album sales, 8,000 song sales, 110.3 million on-demand audio streams, and 4.4 million on-demand video streams. Following the Brighter Days Ahead reissue, Eternal Sunshine returned to number one in Canada for a third non-consecutive week, tying Thank U, Next as her longest-running album in the country. All six tracks from the deluxe edition simultaneously appeared on the Canadian Hot 100 dated April 12, 2025, all within the top-60 region, with "Twilight Zone" leading at number 23.

In Australia, Eternal Sunshine debuted at number one on the ARIA Albums Chart, marking Grande's fifth chart-topping album in the country. It remained at number one for three consecutive weeks. Furthermore, seven tracks appeared simultaneously on the ARIA Top 50 Singles Chart, with "We Can't Be Friends (Wait for Your Love)" debuting at number two, becoming Grande's 20th top-10 hit in the country and the highest-charting song from the album alongside "Yes, And?", which formerly peaked at number two. Following the Brighter Days Ahead reissue, Eternal Sunshine ascended 78 chart positions to retain the number-one spot for a fourth non-consecutive week in the country. It marked the biggest jump to the pole position from within the top 100 since September 2020, when Music From the Home Front (2020) soared from number 83 to the top.

In New Zealand, Eternal Sunshine debuted atop the NZ Top 40 Albums Chart, becoming Grande's fifth chart-topping album there. It remained at number one for two consecutive weeks. Furthermore, nine tracks simultaneously appeared on the NZ Top 40 Singles Chart, with "We Can't Be Friends (Wait for Your Love)" becoming Grande's seventh number-one single and the highest-charting single from the album, surpassing "Yes, And?", which formerly peaked at number three. Following the Brighter Days Ahead reissue, Eternal Sunshine returned to number one on the chart for a third non-consecutive week.

== Accolades ==
Eternal Sunshine and its second single, "We Can't Be Friends (Wait For Your Love)", were predicted by several publications and critics to receive nominations in the Big Four categories at the 67th Annual Grammy Awards. However, both releases received no nominations in the Big Four categories, with the album being nominated for Best Pop Vocal Album and singles "The Boy Is Mine" (remix) and "Yes, And?" scoring one nod each, for Best Pop Duo/Group Performance and Best Dance Pop Recording. Grande was named among the biggest snubs of the ceremony by several publications.

Awards and nominations
Organization	Year	Category	Result	Ref.
Los 40 Music Awards	2024	Best International Album	Nominated	
ARIA Music Awards	2024	Best International Artist	Nominated	
Grammy Awards	2025	Best Pop Vocal Album	Nominated	

== Impact ==
Whether she's layering harmonies over a melody line or vocal arranging an entire bridge on the fly, the superstar's mastery over her instrument only continues to grow with each new album.

— The Recording Academy praising Grande's vocal production

Vanity Fair's Savannah Walsh stated that in the hours after the album's release, viewership of Eternal Sunshine of the Spotless Mind had doubled on Vudu, according to Fandango. Similarly, according to Billboard, Brandy and Monica's "The Boy Is Mine" was up 18% in US streams due to Grande's "The Boy Is Mine" that was inspired by the original.

In a review of Eternal Sunshine, York Vision's Matthew Ennis stated the "Music Icon Status" that Grande possesses in the music industry and emphasized how "Eternal Sunshine is just another example of Grande's visionary skills as an artist who deserves her legacy as one of the most defining musical talents of our time".

== Track listing ==
Standard edition
No.	Title	Lyrics	Music	Producer(s)	Length
1.	"Intro (End of the World)"	Ariana Grande	Grande; Shintaro Yasuda; Nick Lee; Aaron Cheung	Grande; Yasuda; Lee; Aaron Paris	1:32
2.	"Bye"	Grande; Max Martin	Grande; Martin; Ilya Salmanzadeh	Grande; Martin; Ilya	2:44
3.	"Don't Wanna Break Up Again"	Grande; Martin	Grande; Martin; Ilya	Grande; Martin; Ilya	2:54
4.	"Saturn Returns Interlude"	Diana Garland; Grande	Grande; Martin; Ilya	Grande; Martin; Ilya; Will Loftis	0:42
5.	"Eternal Sunshine"	Grande	Grande; Martin; Yasuda; David Park	Grande; Martin; Ilya; Yasuda; Davidior	3:30
6.	"Supernatural"	Grande	Grande; Martin; Oscar Görres	Grande; Martin; Görres	2:43
7.	"True Story"	Grande; Martin	Grande; Martin	Grande; Martin; Ilya	2:43
8.	"The Boy Is Mine"	Grande; Martin	Grande; Martin; Yasuda; Park	Grande; Martin; Ilya; Yasuda; Davidior	2:53
9.	"Yes, And?"	Grande	Grande; Martin; Ilya	Grande; Martin; Ilya	3:34
10.	"We Can't Be Friends (Wait for Your Love)"	Grande	Grande; Martin; Ilya	Grande; Martin; Ilya	3:48
11.	"I Wish I Hated You"	Grande	Grande; Ilya	Grande; Ilya	2:33
12.	"Imperfect for You"	Grande; Martin	Grande; Martin; Ilya; Peter Kahm	Grande; Martin; Ilya	3:02
13.	"Ordinary Things" (featuring Nonna)	Grande; Marjorie Grande	Grande; Lee; Luka Kloser	Grande; Lee; Martin; Kloser	2:48
Total length:					35:26

Slightly Deluxe edition
No.	Title	Lyrics	Music	Producer(s)	Length
14.	"Supernatural" (remix; with Troye Sivan)	Grande; Sivan; Brett McLaughlin	Grande; Martin; Görres	Grande; Martin; Görres	2:43
15.	"Imperfect for You" (acoustic)	Grande; Martin	Grande; Martin; Ilya; Kahm	Grande; Martin; Ilya	3:02
16.	"True Story" (a cappella)	Grande; Martin	Grande; Martin	Grande; Martin; Ilya	2:43
17.	"Yes, And?" (remix; with Mariah Carey)	Grande; Carey	Grande; Martin; Ilya; Carey	Grande; Martin; Ilya	3:35
Total length:					47:23

Slightly Deluxe and Also Live edition
No.	Title	Lyrics	Music	Producer(s)	Length
14.	"Yes, And?" (remix; with Mariah Carey)	Grande; Carey	Grande; Martin; Ilya; Carey	Grande; Martin; Ilya	3:35
15.	"Supernatural" (remix; with Troye Sivan)	Grande; Sivan; McLaughlin	Grande; Martin; Görres	Grande; Martin; Görres	2:43
16.	"The Boy Is Mine" (remix; with Brandy and Monica)	Grande; Martin; Brandy Norwood; Monica Arnold	Grande; Martin; Ilya; Yasuda; Davidior	Grande; Martin; Ilya; Yasuda; Davidior	3:33
17.	"Imperfect for You" (acoustic)	Grande; Martin	Grande; Martin; Ilya; Kahm	Grande; Martin; Ilya	3:02
18.	"Intro (End of the World)" (live version)	Grande	Grande; Yasuda; Lee; Cheung	Grande; Natural	1:43
19.	"Don't Wanna Break Up Again" (live version)	Grande; Martin	Grande; Martin; Ilya	Grande; Natural	2:52
20.	"Eternal Sunshine" (live version)	Grande	Grande; Martin; Yasuda; Park	Grande; Natural	3:26
21.	"Supernatural" (live version)	Grande	Grande; Martin; Görres	Grande; Natural	2:43
22.	"Yes, And?" (live version)	Grande	Grande; Martin; Ilya	Grande; Natural	3:19
23.	"We Can't Be Friends (Wait for Your Love)" (live version)	Grande	Grande; Martin; Ilya	Grande; Natural	3:24
24.	"Imperfect for You" (live version)	Grande; Martin	Grande; Martin; Ilya; Kahm	Grande; Natural	3:06
Total length:					69:00

=== Notes ===
- All track titles, except "Saturn Returns Interlude", are stylized in all lowercase.
- "Saturn Returns Interlude" contains a spoken word excerpt from astrologist Diana Garland.
- For the deluxe edition, see the Brighter Days Ahead edition.

== Personnel ==
=== Musicians ===
- Ariana Grande – lead vocals, background vocals (all tracks); programming (track 4)
- Shintaro Yasuda – keyboards, programming (tracks 1, 5, 8); drums (5, 8)
- Nick Lee – keyboards, programming, trombone (tracks 1, 13); bass, drums (13)
- Aaron Cheung – bass, guitar, programming, synthesizer, violin (track 1)
- Max Martin – keyboards (tracks 2, 3, 5–10, 12); background vocals, bass, drums (tracks 2, 3, 5, 7–10, 12); guitar (tracks 2, 7, 10, 12), programming (tracks 3, 5–10, 12)
- Ilya – background vocals, bass, keyboards, programming (tracks 2–5, 7–12); guitar (2, 7, 10, 12), synthesizer (track 3), piano (tracks 5, 9)
- Mattias Bylund – string arrangement, strings, synthesizer (tracks 2, 3); glockenspiel, horns (track 2)
- Tomas Jonsson – tenor saxophone (tracks 2, 3)
- Peter Jonasson – trombone (tracks 2, 3)
- Magnus Johansson – trumpet, violin (tracks 2, 3)
- Karl Guner – string arrangement, synthesizer (tracks 2, 3)
- Janne Bjerger – trumpet (tracks 2, 3)
- Hanna Helgegren – violin (tracks 2, 3)
- Erik Arvinder – violin (tracks 2, 3)
- Wojtek Goral – alto saxophone (track 2)
- Michael Engström – bass (track 2)
- Lou Carrao – bass (track 2)
- David Bukovinszky – cello (track 2)
- Per Strandberg – guitar (track 2)
- Davidior – keyboards (track 5); drums, programming (track 8)
- Oscar Görres – bass, guitar, keyboards, percussion, programming (track 6)
- Shellback – drums (track 7)
- Davide Rossi – cello, string arrangement, viola, violin (track 10)
- Luka Kloser – bass, drums, keyboards, programming (track 13)
- Troye Sivan – featured artist (track 14, 15)
- Mariah Carey – featured artist (track 17, 14)
- Brandy – featured artist (track 16)
- Monica – featured artist (track 16)

=== Technical ===
- Randy Merrill – mastering
- Serban Ghenea – mixing (tracks 1–3, 5–13)
- Ilya – mixing (track 4)
- Sam Holland – engineering
- Lou Carrao – engineering
- Bryce Bordone – mixing assistance (tracks 1–3, 5–13)
- Eric Eyland – engineering assistance
- Rob Sellens – engineering assistance (tracks 2–5, 7–13)

== Charts ==
=== Weekly charts ===
Weekly chart performance
Chart (2024–2025)	Peak position
Argentine Albums (CAPIF)	1
Australian Albums (ARIA)	1
Austrian Albums (Ö3 Austria)	2
Belgian Albums (Ultratop Flanders)	1
Belgian Albums (Ultratop Wallonia)	1
Canadian Albums (Billboard)	1
Croatian International Albums (HDU)	1
Czech Albums (ČNS IFPI)	4
Danish Albums (Hitlisten)	1
Dutch Albums (Album Top 100)	1
Finnish Albums (Suomen virallinen lista)	8
French Albums (SNEP)	2
German Albums (Offizielle Top 100)	3
Greek Albums (IFPI)	2
Hungarian Albums (MAHASZ)	3
Icelandic Albums (Tónlistinn)	3
Irish Albums (Official Charts)	1
Italian Albums (FIMI)	4
Japanese Albums (Oricon)	13
Japanese Combined Albums (Oricon)	14
Japanese Hot Albums (Billboard Japan)	14
Lithuanian Albums (AGATA)	2
New Zealand Albums (RMNZ)	1
Nigerian Albums (TurnTable)	96
Norwegian Albums (VG-lista)	1
Polish Albums (ZPAV)	1
Portuguese Albums (AFP)	1
Scottish Albums (Official Charts)	2
Slovak Albums (ČNS IFPI)	3
Spanish Albums (Promusicae)	2
Swedish Albums (Sverigetopplistan)	2
Swiss Albums (Schweizer Hitparade)	2
UK Albums (Official Charts)	1
US Billboard 200	1

=== Monthly charts ===
Monthly chart performance
Chart (2024)	Position
Japanese Albums (Oricon)	41

=== Year-end charts ===
2024 year-end chart performance
Chart (2024)	Position
Australian Albums (ARIA)	21
Austrian Albums (Ö3 Austria)	63
Belgian Albums (Ultratop Flanders)	17
Belgian Albums (Ultratop Wallonia)	32
Canadian Albums (Billboard)	27
Croatian International Albums (HDU)	30
Danish Albums (Hitlisten)	45
Dutch Albums (Album Top 100)	7
French Albums (SNEP)	42
German Albums (Offizielle Top 100)	61
Global Albums (IFPI)	13
Hungarian Albums (MAHASZ)	66
Icelandic Albums (Tónlistinn)	39
Italian Albums (FIMI)	85
New Zealand Albums (RMNZ)	11
Polish Albums (ZPAV)	32
Portuguese Albums (AFP)	12
Spanish Albums (PROMUSICAE)	23
Swedish Albums (Sverigetopplistan)	66
Swiss Albums (Schweizer Hitparade)	46
UK Albums (OCC)	29
US Billboard 200	23

2025 year-end chart performance
Chart (2025)	Position
Australian Albums (ARIA)	20
Belgian Albums (Ultratop Flanders)	52
Belgian Albums (Ultratop Wallonia)	98
Canadian Albums (Billboard)	40
Dutch Albums (Album Top 100)	38
French Albums (SNEP)	62
New Zealand Albums (RMNZ)	24
Spanish Albums (PROMUSICAE)	51
UK Albums (OCC)	36
US Billboard 200	28

== Certifications ==
Certifications
Region	Certification	Certified units/sales
Australia (ARIA)	Platinum	70,000^{‡}
Austria (IFPI Austria)	Gold	7,500^{‡}
Belgium (BRMA)	Platinum	20,000^{‡}
Brazil (Pro-Música Brasil)	Platinum	40,000^{‡}
Brazil (Pro-Música Brasil) slightly deluxe	Platinum	40,000^{‡}
Brazil (Pro-Música Brasil) slightly deluxe and also live	2× Platinum	80,000^{‡}
Canada (Music Canada)	Platinum	80,000^{‡}
Denmark (IFPI Danmark)	Platinum	20,000^{‡}
Finland (Musiikkituottajat)	Gold	10,000
France (SNEP)	Platinum	100,000^{‡}
Germany (BVMI)	Gold	75,000^{‡}
Italy (FIMI)	Gold	25,000^{‡}
New Zealand (RMNZ)	2× Platinum	30,000^{‡}
Norway (IFPI Norway)	Platinum	20,000^{‡}
Poland (ZPAV)	Platinum	20,000^{‡}
Portugal (AFP)	Platinum	7,000^{‡}
Spain (Promusicae)	Platinum	40,000^{‡}
United Kingdom (BPI)	Platinum	300,000^{‡}
United States (RIAA)	2× Platinum	2,000,000^{‡}
^{‡} Sales+streaming figures based on certification alone.

== Release history ==
Release history
Region	Date	Format(s)	Version	Label	Ref.
Various	March 8, 2024	Cassette; CD; vinyl LP; digital download; streaming	Standard	Republic	
United States	March 8, 2024	Vinyl	Target exclusive	Republic	
United States	March 10, 2024	Digital download	Slightly Deluxe	Republic	
Various	March 11, 2024	Streaming	Slightly Deluxe	Republic	
Various	October 1, 2024	Digital download; streaming	Slightly Deluxe and Also Live	Republic	

== See also ==
- List of Billboard 200 number-one albums of 2024
- List of Billboard 200 number-one albums of 2025
- List of UK Albums Chart number ones of the 2020s
- List of number-one albums of 2024 (Canada)
- List of number-one albums of 2024 (Croatia)
- List of number-one albums of 2024 (Ireland)
- List of number-one albums from the 2020s (New Zealand)
