= Bye (Ariana Grande song) =

2024 song by Ariana Grande

Song by Ariana Grande

from the album Eternal Sunshine
- Released: March 8, 2024
- Studio: Decoy Studios (Woodbridge, UK); Jungle City Studios (New York City, US); MXM Studios (Stockholm, Sweden)
- Genre: Dance-pop; disco-funk
- Length: 2:45
- Label: Republic
- Songwriters: Ariana Grande; Max Martin; Ilya Salmanzadeh
- Producers: Ariana Grande; Max Martin; Ilya Salmanzadeh

Lyric visualizer
- "Bye" on YouTube

"Bye" is a song by American singer-songwriter Ariana Grande from her seventh studio album, Eternal Sunshine (2024). She wrote and produced the track with Swedish producers Max Martin and Ilya Salmanzadeh. It is an uptempo dance-pop and disco-funk song sonically inspired by 1970s music. The song, rooted in self-awareness and accountability, sees Grande bidding farewell to her partner.

== Background and composition ==
"Bye" is two minutes and 45 seconds long. The song is a lavish and retro-inspired dance-pop, disco, and disco funk song with elements of Philadelphia soul echoing the sound of 1970s pop music. "Bye" features strings, adding in the disco influences throughout the song. Lyrically, Grande sings about how she is prepared to leave her partner, with her friend ready to pick her up. Taking place in the album's track list after "Intro (End of the World)", the song follows the theme of having accountability and self-awareness in a relationship.

== Critical reception ==
Upon release, the song received positive reviews from music critics. Kyle Denis of Billboard called the song "fantastic", ranking it at number three in the parent album's track ranking. Denis praised the song's pre-chorus and the usage of funk and disco influences. Nick Levine, a writer at NME deemed the song an album highlight, saying Grande is "playing disco diva". In a review of the parent album, Rolling Stone and Variety likened the song to "seventies pop" with the latter publication likening the song's sound to Gamble and Huff and Beyoncé.

== Credits ==
Credits are adapted from the liner notes of Eternal Sunshine.

Recording

- Mixed at Mixstar Studios (Virginia Beach)
- Mastered at Sterling Sound (New York City)

Personnel

- Ariana Grande – vocals, lyrics, composition, production
- Max Martin – production, lyrics, composition, drums, guitar, keyboards, bass, background vocals
- Ilya Salmanzadeh – production, composition, drums, synthesizers, guitar, keyboards, bass, programming, background vocals
- Mattias Bylund – horns, strings, strings arrangement, synthesizers, glockenspiel
- Karl Gunér – strings arrangement, synthesizers, programming
- Janne Bjerger – trumpets
- Magnus Johansson – trumpets
- Mattias Johansson – violin
- Erik Arvinder – violin
- Hanna Helgegren – violin
- David Bukovinszky – cello
- Peter Noos Johansson – trombone
- Tomas Jonsson – baritone saxophone
- Wojtek Goral – alto saxophone
- Per Strandberg– guitar
- Sam Holland – engineering
- Lou Carrao – engineering
- Eric Eylands – engineering assistance
- Rob Sellens – engineering assistance
- Randy Merrill – mastering
- Serban Ghenea – mixing
- Bryce Bordone – mixing assistance

== Charts ==
Chart performance for "Bye"
Chart (2024)	Peak position
Australia (ARIA)	19
Brazil Hot 100 (Billboard)	72
Canada Hot 100 (Billboard)	21
France (SNEP)	59
Global 200 (Billboard)	12
Greece International (IFPI)	13
Lithuania (AGATA)	73
Malaysia (Billboard)	23
Malaysia International (RIM)	20
MENA (IFPI)	17
Netherlands (Single Top 100)	41
New Zealand (Recorded Music NZ)	20
Philippines (Billboard)	20
Poland (Polish Streaming Top 100)	68
Portugal (AFP)	24
Singapore (RIAS)	30
Slovakia Singles Digital (ČNS IFPI)	99
Spain (PROMUSICAE)	91
Sweden Heatseeker (Sverigetopplistan)	5
UK Singles (OCC)	13
US Billboard Hot 100	25

== Certifications ==
Certifications for "Bye"
Region	Certification	Certified units/sales
Australia (ARIA)	Gold	35,000^{‡}
Brazil (Pro-Música Brasil)	2× Platinum	80,000^{‡}
Canada (Music Canada)	Gold	40,000^{‡}
New Zealand (RMNZ)	Gold	15,000^{‡}
United Kingdom (BPI)	Silver	200,000^{‡}
United States (RIAA)	Platinum	1,000,000^{‡}
^{‡} Sales+streaming figures based on certification alone.
