= Brighter Days Ahead =

2025 short film by Christian Breslauer and Ariana Grande

- Official poster
- Directed by: Christian Breslauer; Ariana Grande
- Written by: Christian Breslauer; Ariana Grande
- Based on: Eternal Sunshine by Ariana Grande
- Produced by: Micheal Breslauer; Andrew Lerios
- Starring: Ariana Grande
- Cinematography: Jeff Cronenweth
- Edited by: Luis Caraza
- Music by: Ariana Grande
- Production companies: London Alley; The Lucky Bastards
- Distributed by: Republic Records
- Release date: March 28, 2025
- Running time: 26 minutes
- Country: United States
- Language: English

Brighter Days Ahead is a 2025 American musical science fiction short film written and directed by Christian Breslauer and Ariana Grande, the latter in her directorial debut. It is an accompanying piece to Grande's seventh studio album Eternal Sunshine (2024) and its 2025 reissue, which shares the same subtitle as the film.

Grande first teased a short film in a Vanity Fair interview while promoting Wicked (2024). She continued to tease the album's deluxe edition in various interviews and public appearances before announcing it on March 10, 2025. She teased the short film two days prior before announcing it via an Instagram post on March 12. In the teaser trailer posted alongside the announcement, Grande also revealed that she would be reprising her role as Peaches, a character she introduced in the music video for "We Can't Be Friends (Wait for Your Love)", with the short film being a sequel to that work.

Produced by London Alley and the Lucky Bastards, Brighter Days Ahead was released on YouTube on March 28, 2025, in conjunction with the deluxe reissue of Eternal Sunshine. At the 2025 MTV Video Music Awards, the short film won Video of the Year, Best Pop Video and Best Long Form Video.

== Plot ==
Seventy years after successfully erasing the memory of her time with an ex-boyfriend, (Note: As depicted in the music video for "We Can't Be Friends (Wait for Your Love)" (2024)) Peaches sits in the waiting room of Brighter Days Inc. and signs an electronic consent form. A nurse takes her into a room that would allow her to relive four of her most valuable memories for the final time and destroying the memories in the process. She begins her journey by looking at old videos of her family that were captured during her childhood ("Intro (End of the World)").

She continues with the second memory, which is focused on her career as a singer ("Eternal Sunshine" / "Dandelion"). In the third memory, Peaches wakes up in a destroyed and flooded home. She comes across two important items as she examines the damages: a teddy bear and a necklace ("Twilight Zone"). Peaches leaves her home to find that her entire neighborhood had been demolished. She walks directly towards a UFO and is abducted ("Supernatural").

The fourth and final memory is told from the perspective of Peaches' father, who founded Brighter Days. He is stricken with grief following the death of his daughter who was torn apart and finds himself reliving past memories of his own, such as the time when he gave her the aforementioned necklace. After collecting Peaches' heart in a London pub, and her brain in a pile of rubble, her father places the organs inside the body of a woman created in his daughter's image. It takes several attempts before he successfully brings her to life through music and electricity ("Hampstead"). The revived Peaches and her father play piano together at the pub. Peaches is wearing her necklace from the house. The older Peaches is content with her session. In the final scene, a child-aged Peaches recalls a time when someone told her to live each day as if it were her last. An acoustic rendition of "We Can't Be Friends (Wait for Your Love)", recorded at Jungle City Studios, plays during the end credits.

== Cast ==
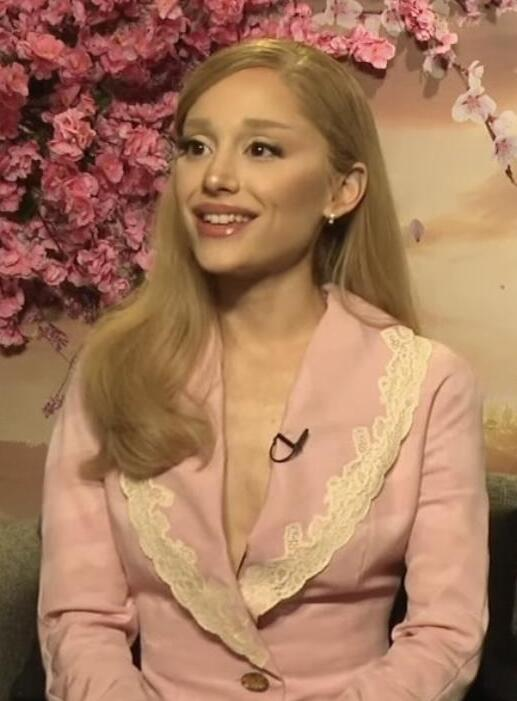
Grande reprises her role as Peaches from the Eternal Sunshine music videos, and serves as co-director, co-writer and executive producer

- Ariana Grande as Peaches, an elderly and non-verbal woman who undergoes a memory restoration procedure. She was inspired by Clementine Kruczynski from Michel Gondry's Eternal Sunshine of the Spotless Mind (2004).
- Edward Butera as Peaches' father, a mad scientist and founder of Brighter Days Inc.
- Charlotte Sanchez as young Peaches
- Rashawn Ross as the trumpet player
- Allen Marsh as the hologram doctor
- Jessica Jang as the hologram nurse
- Trell Isaac as a hologram patient
- Kimberly Kim as a hologram patient
- Stewart Jewett as the doctor
- Lauren DeShane as the nurse
- Fida Varela as the exam room nurse
- Brittany Carel as the exam room patient
- Shane Antolak, R. Ray Barnes and Tiana Bes as waiting room extras
- Veronica Mannion, Amanda Boe, Dylan Reece, Kais Boukthir, Skip Howland, Vivian Day, Lee John Gilligan, Josh Cruse, Sam Russell, Cassandra Rucker, Russell Fear, and Veronica Hart as tavern extras

== Release and promotion ==
Following the 97th Academy Awards, where Grande was nominated for Best Supporting Actress for her role as Glinda in Wicked (2024), Grande changed the name of her second Instagram account, formerly known as @Sweetener, to @BrighterDays, the name of the fictional memory erasure clinic that appeared in the music video for "We Can't Be Friends (Wait for Your Love)". To mark the one year anniversary of the release of Eternal Sunshine, Grande unveiled a pre-save link for the deluxe edition and released a teaser trailer for the short film. In the teaser trailer, a box which contains various items seen in the "We Can't Be Friends (Wait for Your Love)" music video can be seen burning, before flickering to a shot of the items torn apart on the floor.

Grande then officially announced the deluxe repackage of Eternal Sunshine, subtitled Brighter Days Ahead, on March 10, 2025, for release on March 28. Two days later, Grande announced an accompanying short film via an Instagram post in which she released another teaser trailer. In this trailer, a voice can be heard saying "Welcome back, Peaches." before flickering to various shots of Grande. The film’s poster was released via the @BrighterDays Instagram account. On March 23, 2025, Grande announced limited screenings of the short film in four U.S. cities on March 30, 2025; her hometown, Boca Raton, Chicago, Los Angeles, and New York City. Grande released two more teasers on March 25 and March 27, 2025. In the former, a locket featuring a photo of a younger Grande is held in someone's hand. In the latter, it shows a futuristic-esque version of the Brighter Days clinic—as seen in the "We Can't Be Friends (Wait for Your Love)" music video—while zooming in on a woman in a wheelchair, a series of rapid shots take place in which we see an aged-version of Grande's hands, leading to believe Grande will portray an older version of her character, Peaches.

== Awards and nominations ==
Award	Date of ceremony	Category	Nominee(s)	Result	Ref.
MTV Video Music Awards	September 7, 2025	Video of the Year	Brighter Days Ahead	Won	
MTV Video Music Awards	September 7, 2025	Best Long Form Video	Brighter Days Ahead	Won	
MTV Video Music Awards	September 7, 2025	Best Pop	Brighter Days Ahead	Won	
MTV Video Music Awards	September 7, 2025	Best Direction	Christian Breslauer	Nominated	
MTV Video Music Awards	September 7, 2025	Best Cinematography	Jeff Cronenweth	Nominated	
MTV Video Music Awards	September 7, 2025	Best Visual Effects	Mathematic	Nominated	
Berlin Commercial Awards	October 18, 2025	Color Grading	Brighter Days Ahead	Shortlisted	
UK Music Video Awards	October 30, 2025	Best Special Video Project	Brighter Days Ahead	Nominated	
Camerimage International Cinematography Festival	November 22, 2025	Best Music Video	Jeff Cronenweth ("Supernatural" section)	Nominated	
American Society of Cinematographers Awards	March 8, 2026	Music Video Award	Jeff Cronenweth ("Supernatural" section)	Nominated	
