= True Story (song) =

Song by Ariana Grande

from the album Eternal Sunshine
- Released: March 8, 2024
- Studio: Decoy Studios (Woodbridge, UK); Jungle City Studios (New York, NY); MXM Studios (Stockholm, Sweden)
- Genre: R&B; pop
- Length: 2:43
- Label: Republic
- Songwriters: Ariana Grande; Max Martin
- Producers: Ariana Grande; Max Martin; Ilya Salmanzadeh

Lyric visualizer
- "True Story" on YouTube

"True Story" is a song by American singer-songwriter Ariana Grande from her seventh studio album, Eternal Sunshine (2024). It was released on March 8, 2024, through Republic Records, as the seventh track from the album. It was written and produced by Grande and Max Martin, with Ilya receiving production credits as well. An a cappella version was included on the "Slightly Deluxe" edition of Eternal Sunshine. However, this version is not included on the "Slight Deluxe and Also Live" version of the album, being replaced by the remix of "The Boy Is Mine" with Brandy and Monica.

== Composition ==
"True Story" is two minutes and 43 seconds long. The song is described by Grande to be "an untrue story based on all untrue events" and features writing and production from Max Martin. Sonically, the song has been described as R&B and pop featuring a catchy, "candy floss" chorus, metal bass lines, and some elements of G-funk in its instrumentation. Lyrically, the song has Grande being self-referential to the image the media and tabloids put upon her regarding stories about her personal and dating life. In the album's track list, the song is intended by Grande to set up and precede "The Boy Is Mine", letting her play the "bad girl".

== Critical reception ==
Upon release, the song received positive reviews from music critics. Kyle Denis of Billboard ranked the song at number one, in a ranking of the album. In the ranking, Denis called the song "the smartest song Grande has ever made", noting the self-awareness in its lyrics and its similarities of "the 90s pop & R&B bounce" of "Fantasize". Nick Levine, a writer at NME deemed the song an album highlight, calling it "cleverly self-referential" and applauding Grande's vocal performance over the "G-funk" inspired beat. In a review of the parent album, Rolling Stone likened the song to something created by Timbaland for American singer Aaliyah.

== Credits ==
Recording

- Mixed at Mixstar Studios (Virginia Beach)
- Mastered at Sterling Sound (New York City)

Personnel

- Ariana Grande – vocals, lyrics, composition, production
- Max Martin – lyrics, production, composition, guitar, drums, keyboards, bass, programming, background vocals
- Ilya Salmanzadeh – production, composition, guitar, drums, keyboards, bass, programming, background vocals
- Shellback – drums
- Sam Holland – engineering
- Lou Carrao – engineering
- Eric Eylands – engineering assistance
- Rob Sellens – engineering assistance
- Randy Merrill – mastering
- Serban Ghenea – mixing
- Bryce Bordone – mixing assistance

== Charts ==
Chart performance for "True Story"
Chart (2024)	Peak position
Australia (ARIA)	39
Brazil Hot 100 (Billboard)	73
Canada Hot 100 (Billboard)	30
France (SNEP)	62
Global 200 (Billboard)	18
Greece International (IFPI)	15
Lithuania (AGATA)	100
New Zealand (Recorded Music NZ)	35
Poland (Polish Streaming Top 100)	85
Portugal (AFP)	32
Sweden Heatseeker (Sverigetopplistan)	14
UAE (IFPI)	20
UK Streaming (OCC)	30
US Billboard Hot 100	30

== Certifications ==
Certifications for "True Story"
Region	Certification	Certified units/sales
Brazil (Pro-Música Brasil)	2× Platinum	80,000^{‡}
^{‡} Sales+streaming figures based on certification alone.
