= Fantasize (song) =

Song by Ariana Grande
- Recorded: August 2021
- Genre: Pop; R&B
- Length: 3:20
- Songwriters: Ariana Grande; Max Martin; Savan Kotecha
- Producers: Ariana Grande; Max Martin; Savan Kotecha

"Fantasize" is an unreleased song by American singer Ariana Grande, written and produced by Grande, Max Martin, and Savan Kotecha in August 2021 for an unreleased comedy sketch. It was leaked in its entirety in June 2023 and went viral on TikTok. Grande later recorded "The Boy Is Mine", which contains structures similar to "Fantasize", in light of the song going viral, for her seventh studio album, Eternal Sunshine (2024). "The Boy Is Mine" was released as a single in June 2024.

== Background and composition ==
"Fantasize" was written by Grande and featured production by Max Martin and Savan Kotecha. The track is a mid-tempo, 1990s inspired pop-R&B song that Grande described as "parody of a nineties girl group". The song, originally titled, "90s Idea Number 3 2.1", was leaked in three demo versions on June 25, 2023, with the third receiving the most attention. Grande stated that the song was meant for an unreleased television series that was produced by Seth MacFarlane.

A leak of the third demo was posted to Spotify by user "Adriana Venti" on August 19, 2023 as "But Just Before I Go, There's Something You Should Know" and garnered over 1.2 million streams by September 4, 2023, going as far as debuting at number 200 on the Philippines' Spotify Daily Top Songs. The user was allegedly fined $10,000 and ordered to do over 48 hours of community service.

== Reception ==
Fans described the song as their "new obsession" and said its throwback sound "scratched their brains". It gained traction and went viral on TikTok, soundtracking 130,000 videos by August 2023.

Grande was unhappy with the leak and urged people to stop spreading it. The song was eventually reworked into "The Boy Is Mine" for her seventh studio album, Eternal Sunshine (2024). Commenting on the leaked song's success, she jokingly remarked: "Thank you so much. I'll see you in jail. Literally."
