= Saturn Returns Interlude =

Song by Ariana Grande

from the album Eternal Sunshine
- Released: March 8, 2024
- Recorded: November 2013
- Studio: Jungle City (New York City); MXM (Stockholm); Decoy (Suffolk)
- Length: 0:42
- Label: Republic
- Composers: Ariana Grande; Max Martin; Ilya Salmanzadeh
- Lyricist: Diana Garland
- Producers: Ariana Grande; Max Martin; Ilya; Will Loftis

Lyric visualizer
- "Saturn Returns Interlude" on YouTube

"Saturn Returns Interlude" is a song by American singer-songwriter Ariana Grande from her seventh studio album, Eternal Sunshine (2024). The track is a 42-second spoken interlude that samples a YouTube video of a monologue by Scottish-Canadian astrologer Diana Garland explaining the Saturn return astrological phenomenon.

== Music and lyrics ==
"Saturn Returns Interlude", Eternal Sunshine's 42-second spoken interlude, samples a video about the Saturn return published by Scottish astrologer Diana Garland on YouTube in November 2013. Setting the tone of the album, the monologue begins by explaining the Saturn cycle, an astrological concept surrounding the planet's revolution around the Earth that takes about 29 years to complete. Garland says this is the moment when one should "wake up and smell the coffee" (to face the difficulties of life), and she concludes that when Saturn "hits [one] over the head and says 'wake up'", one should begin changes in how they live and reflect on their sense of self. Her voice is distorted and backed by airy synthesizers that transition into Eternal Sunshine's next song, the title track.

Each time Saturn makes that return, it's sort of an opportunity to go through a kind of upgrade, if you have gotten to a level of awareness within yourself. Or you have the appetite for new learning through building.

— Diana Garland, 2024 BBC News interview about "Saturn Returns Interlude"

Several publications noticed "Saturn Returns Interlude" was released just weeks after multiple other songs about the Saturn return, specifically "Saturn" by SZA and "Deeper Well" by Kacey Musgraves, and thus analyzed the topic with the help of astrologers and astronomers. (Note: Cited to multiple sources. "Saturn" was released on February 22, 2024, while "Deeper Well" was released on February 8.) Lisa Stardust and Jake Register, speaking for Today and Vox respectively, posited that as Grande approached her Saturn return and her 30s, she engaged in deep reflections on and continued healing from her past romantic relationships, some of the main themes of Eternal Sunshine. Talking to Vulture's Devon Ivie about "Saturn Returns Interlude", Pamela L. Gay of the Planetary Science Institute argued from a scientific perspective that Saturn returns coincide with the human brain's full maturity and therefore result in "wake up" moments like Grande's that allow one to reflect on past mistakes. Garland, interviewed by BBC News, said that Grande, SZA, and Musgraves, all of whom were in their early- to mid-30s, commented the three were in a "perfect age for self-reflection".

Garland was completely unaware of Grande when she was first asked to clear the sample for "Saturn Returns Interlude". She had been studying astrology for around 50 years and used her knowledge to build a sizeable, 27,000-subscriber YouTube channel, where she posted videos answering astrology-related questions such as the one about Saturn returns. Garland told Rolling Stone and BBC News that she did not think much of the video and considered it a spur-of-the-moment upload; she was surprised when Grande's team contacted her son for the rights to the clip, to which he declined to respond. By that point, Garland had retired from her YouTube career, leading to further confusion on how the team found her video, so she and her son deemed their efforts as a possible scam. Despite this, Grande's team persisted in their efforts, so when Garland's son received confirmation they were not being scammed, they agreed to license the audio. Garland reflected: "I suppose maybe my little clip was picked, because certain people were familiar with me [on the YouTube astrology community] from all that time ago."

== Credits ==
Recording and management

- Published by Universal Tunes (SESAC), Wolf Cousins/Warner Chappell Music Scandinavia (STIM), MXM Music (adm. by Kobalt Music) (STIM)
- Recorded at Jungle City Studios (New York City), MXM Studios (Stockholm), and Decoy Studios (Suffolk)
- Mastered at Sterling Sound (Edgewater, New Jersey)
- Excerpt of "Saturn Return – Why 29 Years Old Is an Important Age" used courtesy of Diana Garland

Personnel

- Ariana Grande – composition, production, programming, arrangement, backing vocals
- Max Martin – composition, production
- Ilya Salmanzadeh – composition, production, programming, arrangement, backing vocals, bass, keyboards, mixing
- Will Loftis – production
- Diana Garland – lyrics
- Sam Holland – engineering
- Lou Carrao – engineering
- Eric Eylands – assistant engineering
- Rob Sellens – assistant engineering
- Bryce Bordone – engineering (for mix)
- Randy Merrill – mastering

== Charts ==
Chart performance for "Saturn Returns Interlude"
| Chart (2024) | Peak position |
|---|---|
| Australia (ARIA) | 71 |
| France (SNEP) | 174 |
| Greece International (IFPI) | 57 |
| Portugal (AFP) | 88 |
| UK Streaming (OCC) | 78 |

== Certifications ==
Certifications for "Saturn Returns Interlude"
| Region | Certification | Certified units/sales |
|---|---|---|
| Brazil (Pro-Música Brasil) | Platinum | 40,000^{‡} |
^{‡} Sales+streaming figures based on certification alone.
