= Dandelion (Ariana Grande song) =

2025 promotional single by Ariana Grande

Promotional single by Ariana Grande

from the album Eternal Sunshine Deluxe: Brighter Days Ahead
- B-side: "Warm"
- Released: September 4, 2025
- Length: 3:24
- Label: Republic
- Songwriters: Ariana Grande; Max Martin; Ilya Salmanzadeh
- Producers: Ariana Grande; Max Martin; Ilya Salmanzadeh

Ariana Grande promotional singles chronology
"I Don't Know Why (I Just Do)" (2025)	"Supernatural" / "Dandelion" / "Hampstead" (2025)	"For Good" (2025)

Music video
- "Dandelion" on YouTube

"Dandelion" is a song by American singer-songwriter Ariana Grande from Eternal Sunshine Deluxe: Brighter Days Ahead, the 2025 reissue of her seventh studio album, Eternal Sunshine (2024). It was released as a promotional single through Republic Records on September 4, 2025. On the same date, a 7-inch vinyl of the song was released, served with B-side track "Warm". The song was written and produced by Grande, Max Martin, and Ilya Salmanzadeh.

Most critics were relatively positive for "Dandelion", commenting on its metaphorical lyricism and praising its jazzy-trap sound. The track reached number 19 on the UK Singles chart and the top 40 of national charts in Ireland, New Zealand, and the Philippines, as well as the US Billboard Global 200 and Billboard Hot 100.

== Background and release ==
"Dandelion" is one of the additional tracks featured on Eternal Sunshine Deluxe: Brighter Days Ahead, the deluxe edition of Grande's seventh studio album, Eternal Sunshine. A shortened version of "Dandelion" including five other songs from Eternal Sunshine and its deluxe edition are played in the short film, Brighter Days Ahead. Grande performs the song along with the album's title track in the film. "Dandelion" was first released on March 28, 2025, as part of the deluxe album, and then was released exclusively as a 7-inch vinyl single alongside "Warm" on September 4, 2025. A t-shirt with a dandelion art and part of the song's lyrics, "Can't you see me bloom at night?", was available via her website.

== Composition ==
"Dandelion" incorporates trap beats and jazz horns, combining a futuristic production style with sensual lyricism. The song uses the image of a dandelion as a metaphor associated with resilience, healing and wish-making. In the lyrics, Grande invites a romantic interest to what Her Campus described as "make a wish" on her, suggesting she can fulfill their desires, while lines in the pre-chorus use the imagery of "plant[ing] this seed" to allude to the growth of a relationship. Rolling Stone similarly observed that it presents Grande mourning a past romance while simultaneously expressing desire for new love, using garden-themed metaphors such as "I got what you need / I'm thinking you should plant this seed".

== Commercial performance ==
Following its release as part of Eternal Sunshine Deluxe: Brighter Days Ahead, "Dandelion" entered the Official Charts Company's Trending Top 20 at number 3, alongside "Twilight Zone", which debuted at number 1. It peaked at number 19 on the UK Singles Chart and number 24 on the Billboard Global 200. The song also entered the top 30 in Ireland and the Philippines, peaking at numbers 29 and 28, respectively. In other regions, "Dandelion" reached the top 50, including number 38 on both the US Billboard Hot 100 and the New Zealand Singles Chart, as well as number 45 in Australia and Canada. In France, the track peaked at number 180.

== Critical reception ==
"Dandelion" has drawn attention for its reflective lyrics and moody sound, with listeners connecting it to the album's broader themes of love, loss and personal development. Rolling Stone highlighted the song as one of the standout tracks from Eternal Sunshine Deluxe: Brighter Days Ahead, including it in its list of the Best Songs of 2025. Writing for Billboard, Kyle Denis placed the track last in a ranking of all the bonus songs on the deluxe album. Denis stated while the song has nice, smooth horns in its intro, it turns quickly into a "fiery amalgamation" of bass, synths, and a trap beat that he said would make the track fit in on Thank U, Next (2019), one of Grande's earlier albums. He also stated that "Dandelion" has more of the R&B and 90's style than the rest of the new songs, making it seem out of place. While still a very solid song, its smoky intro sets it apart from the rest of the tracks, its chorus is repetitive, and it doesn't reach the same heights as the others, according to Atwood Magazine.

== Track listing ==
Side A

1. "Dandelion" – 3:25

Side B

1. "Warm" – 3:22

== Charts ==
Weekly chart performance
Chart (2025)	Peak position
Australia (ARIA)	45
Canada Hot 100 (Billboard)	45
France (SNEP)	180
Global 200 (Billboard)	24
Ireland (IRMA)	29
New Zealand (Recorded Music NZ)	38
Philippines (Philippines Hot 100)	28
Singapore (RIAS)	28
UK Singles (Official Charts)	19
US Billboard Hot 100	38

== Certifications ==
Certifications for "Dandelion"
Region	Certification	Certified units/sales
Brazil (Pro-Música Brasil)	Platinum	40,000^{‡}
^{‡} Sales+streaming figures based on certification alone.

== Release history ==
List of release dates and formats
Region	Date	Format(s)	Label	Ref.
United States	September 4, 2025	7-inch vinyl	Republic	
