= The Boy Is Mine (Ariana Grande song) =

2024 single by Ariana Grande

Single by Ariana Grande

from the album Eternal Sunshine
- B-side: "The Boy Is Mine" (a cappella)
- Released: June 7, 2024
- Recorded: 2023
- Studio: Jungle City (New York City)
- Genre: R&B
- Length: 2:53
- Label: Republic
- Songwriters: Ariana Grande; Max Martin; Shintaro Yasuda; David Park
- Producers: Ariana Grande; Max Martin; Shintaro Yasuda; Ilya; Davidior

Ariana Grande singles chronology
"We Can't Be Friends (Wait for Your Love)" (2024)	"The Boy Is Mine" (2024)	"Popular" (2024)

Music video
- "The Boy Is Mine" on YouTube

"The Boy Is Mine" is a song by American singer-songwriter Ariana Grande from her seventh studio album, Eternal Sunshine (2024). It was released through Republic Records on June 7, 2024, as the album’s third single. The song was written by Grande, Max Martin, Shintaro Yasuda, and Davidior, who produced the song alongside Ilya. Inspired by a leaked demo Grande made for a comedy sketch, the song is an R&B track that reimagines the 1998 duet of the same name by American singers Brandy and Monica, both of whom would provide guest vocals in a remix released on June 21, 2024, which received a nomination for Best Pop Duo/Group Performance at the 67th Annual Grammy Awards.

Upon release, "The Boy Is Mine" received positive reviews from music critics for its '90s R&B sound and sultry lyrical content. The song peaked at no. 14 on the US Billboard Hot 100 and in the top 20 on the Canadian Hot 100 as an album track. Grande promoted the single with performances at the 2024 Met Gala and on The Tonight Show Starring Jimmy Fallon. A music video directed by Christian Breslauer was released on June 7, 2024, starring Grande as a protagonist inspired by Catwoman and American actor Penn Badgley as her love interest, with cameo appearances by Brandy and Monica.

== Background and release ==
An unreleased song by Grande entitled "Fantasize" was leaked in full to Spotify by fans in 2023. Recorded in 2021, Grande said that the song was a demo that was not intended to be released as a single by her and that she wrote it for a comedy sketch about a girl group that ultimately was not released. Upon learning of the leak, she commented under a TikTok video that she was disheartened and asked people to stop spreading the leaks.

"Fantasize" was positively received by fans, inspiring Grande to include elements of the song for her seventh studio album, Eternal Sunshine (2024). According to Grande, "The Boy Is Mine" was one of the first ideas she and Max Martin worked on for the album. During an interview about the album, Grande referred to "The Boy Is Mine" as her version of "Fantasize" and stated about her leaked songs "although you've heard them — because you stole them — they're very different now."

"The Boy Is Mine" was one of the last few track titles to be revealed on February 27, 2024, as track 8. The song was confirmed by Grande to be the album's next single on May 7. After the music video released, the song impacted US contemporary hit radio on June 11. It later impacted US rhythmic contemporary and urban contemporary radio stations on June 25. This would make the song her first crossover single since "Side to Side". The song would be released as a single exclusively for digital download, later streaming and physicals. The single included the remix, an instrumental, and a capella versions of the original and the remix.

== Music and lyrics ==
"The Boy Is Mine" is two minutes and 53 seconds long. The song is described as a trap-influenced R&B song with bass-heavy instrumentation echoing late '90s and early 2000s R&B-pop music. The song begins with the melody of the pre-chorus playing. Grande then sings about how this love interest of hers is destined to be with her, claiming him as hers. The pre-chorus features Grande expressing how something about her crush is made for her, saying there's no use in denying it. The track's tempo slows down before jumping into the chorus, where she states the stars align for this relationship. In the song's bridge, Grande exclaims how her relationship with her love interest is meant to be, taking accountability for any drama created. As intended by Grande when creating the parent album's track list, the song follows and plays off the same idea of the album's seventh track, "True Story", playing the role the media expects her to play.

Grande described "The Boy Is Mine" as a reimagining of the similarly titled 1998 single by Brandy and Monica, which was about two women fighting over the affection of one man. She was inspired by her fans' appreciation for "Fantasize" because of what she called its "bad bitch" energy, and she told Zane Lowe during an Apple Music 1 interview: "There is a large group of my fans that really do love a bad girl anthem, and this is an elevated version of that." In the lyrics, Grande expresses her affection for a man with whom she believes she is destined to be in a romance.

== Music video ==
Grande announced on May 27 that the music video for "The Boy Is Mine" would be released on June 7. Christian Breslauer, who worked on the visuals for both "Yes, And?" and "We Can't Be Friends (Wait for Your Love)" from Eternal Sunshine, commented on Grande's teaser and shared the sneak peek on his own Instagram account. "Get your popcorn, take your seats," Breslauer wrote on Grande's post; "ACT III… soon", said the music video director on his personal Instagram page.

The music video features Grande returning as Peaches alias Catwoman, and Penn Badgley as the mayor of the city who has released feral cats into the streets to eradicate a rat infestation. R&B singers Brandy and Monica make a cameo appearance as news anchors reporting on the rat crisis. The video features Grande's Victorious co-star, Elizabeth Gillies, providing her voice for a Brighter Days commercial and the sound effects for the rats.

=== Synopsis ===
The video begins with a garbage collector complaining about the mayor before getting attacked by rats. Peaches is seen looking at a glowing pink potion, later turning her attention to two news reporters on the television. It is revealed that the mayor, Max Starling, has a plan to exterminate the city's rodent infestation by using the large numbers of stray cats roaming around. A cat sneaks into Peaches' open apartment window and knocks over the potion, alarming her.

The song begins and Peaches starts gathering the spilled potion with a syringe and putting into a vial. During the chorus, she runs over to her personal shrine of Starling, who she is in love with. She spins around, before grabbing black clothing from her closet. She is seen cutting the fabrics of the clothes and sewing. The next scene is set at night, atop a building complex in front of a city skyline. Peaches is donning brunette shoulder-length hair and a black cat mask covering her eyes. Her attire is now an all black dominatrix outfit with a skirt and a whip, which she cracks. She then is seen running and jumping over buildings before arriving to the mayor's apartment overhead window. With her glove's cat-like sharpened nails, she traces a circle on the window glass and licking her hand to cut it out.

The music stops and the scene is set inside Starling's apartment, where he soaks his face into ice bath. Peaches sneaks up to the bathroom door, admiring him until he catches a glimpse of her. She runs off and he follows, looking shocked and dropping a glass of alcohol. The song's chorus continues and Peaches is seen on his bed, laid out seductively and displaying cat-like actions. Starling attempts to make an escape before Peaches strikes her whip at him, grabbing his foot. During the bridge, she pulls him over to the bed slowly. She walks over to him, holding the love potion in an attempt to have him consume it. He stops her, and reaching over to her mask to reveal her face. He throws the potion at the wall and the song ends. During the credits, Peaches and Starling are now together in an apartment, surrounded by cats and feeding one of them.

== Live performances ==
Grande performing "The Boy Is Mine" as Catwoman on the Eternal Sunshine Tour

The first time Grande performed "The Boy Is Mine" was at the 2024 Met Gala. Grande's full performance at the 2024 Met Gala was not officially published online. On June 6, Grande performed the song for the first time on live television at The Tonight Show Starring Jimmy Fallon and she was accompanied by the show's house band The Roots. This was Grande's first late night interview since 2021 and her 11th appearance on The Tonight Show.

"The Boy Is Mine" was included in the set list of the Eternal Sunshine Tour (2026). Styled by Law Roach, Grande wears a custom Ludovic de Saint Sernin lace mini dress, Christian Louboutin ballet boots, and a black Catwoman mask.

== Critical reception ==
The song received positive reviews from music critics upon release of the parent album. In a ranking of tracks from the parent album, Kyle Denis of Billboard ranked the song at number four in a track ranking of the album. Denis received the song positively, noting its tongue-in-cheek nature and the '90s R&B sound similar to "Fantasize". Rolling Stone called the song a "late Nineties, early Aughts, R&B-pop moment" also commenting on the fact that the song might bring controversy amongst rumors involving Grande and Ethan Slater. Jem Aswad of Variety called the song "comparatively sprightly" and felt the song was an outlier amongst the rest of the album. Laura Snappes of The Guardian referred to the song as "trap-Aaliyah hauteur", also calling it "possessive". Poppie Platt of The Daily Telegraph claimed the song stands on its own against the song of the same name, describing as a "silky ode to love and lust". Lindsay Zoladz of The New York Times described it as "a lusty song about a forbidden crush" and likened its "stuttering" percussion to that of the boy-bands Max Martin has worked with before.

== Accolades ==
Awards and nominations for "The Boy Is Mine"
Organization	Year	Category	Result	Ref.
MTV Video Music Awards	2024	Best Visual Effects	Nominated	
BMI Pop Awards	2025	Most-Performed Songs of the Year	Won	

== Commercial performance ==
Prior to its release as a single, "The Boy Is Mine" debuted at number 16 on the Billboard Hot 100 as the highest-charting album track. Globally, "The Boy Is Mine" charted on the Billboard Global 200 chart, at number eleven, for the chart issue dated March 23, 2024.

After being serviced to radio stations as the third single from Eternal Sunshine, "The Boy Is Mine" debuted at number 38 on the Billboard Mainstream Top 40 airplay chart, rising to number 31 in its second week. It later debuted at number 39 on the Billboard Rhythmic airplay chart on the issue dated July 6, 2024. The song eventually peaked at number 16 and number 4 on each of the charts, respectively.

== Covers ==
In August 2024, British girl group Flo covered the song in a mashup with the 1998 song "The Boy Is Mine" for BBC Radio 1's 1Xtra Live Lounge.

== Credits ==
Recording

- Mixed at Mixstar Studios (Virginia Beach)
- Mastered at Sterling Sound (New York City)

Personnel

- Ariana Grande – vocals, lyrics, composition, production
- Max Martin – lyrics, production, composition, drums, keyboards, bass, programming, background vocals
- Ilya Salmanzadeh – production, composition, drums, keyboards, bass, programming, background vocals
- Shintaro Yasuda – production, composition, keyboards, drums, programming
- Davidior – production, composition, drums, programming
- Sam Holland – engineering
- Lou Carrao – engineering
- Eric Eylands – engineering assistance
- Rob Sellens – engineering assistance
- Randy Merrill – mastering
- Serban Ghenea – mixing
- Bryce Bordone – mixing assistance

== Track listing ==
Streaming/digital download – single

1. "The Boy Is Mine" – 2:53
2. "The Boy Is Mine" (a cappella) – 2:43
3. "The Boy Is Mine" (instrumental) – 2:53
4. "The Boy Is Mine" (remix; with Brandy and Monica) – 3:33
5. "The Boy Is Mine" (remix a cappella; with Brandy and Monica) – 3:32

== Charts ==
=== Weekly charts ===
Weekly chart performance
Chart (2024)	Peak position
Australia (ARIA)	28
Brazil Hot 100 (Billboard)	69
Canada Hot 100 (Billboard)	15
Canada CHR/Top 40 (Billboard)	23
France (SNEP)	58
Global 200 (Billboard)	11
Greece International (IFPI)	9
Ireland (IRMA)	51
Lebanon (Lebanese Top 20)	9
Lithuania (AGATA)	52
Malaysia International (RIM)	12
MENA (IFPI)	12
New Zealand (Recorded Music NZ)	23
Philippines (Philippines Hot 100)	24
Poland (Polish Streaming Top 100)	64
Portugal (AFP)	25
Saudi Arabia (IFPI)	15
Singapore (RIAS)	17
Slovakia Singles Digital (ČNS IFPI)	82
Spain (PROMUSICAE)	99
Sweden Heatseeker (Sverigetopplistan)	1
UAE (IFPI)	20
UK Singles (Official Charts)	39
US Billboard Hot 100	16
US Adult Pop Airplay (Billboard)	29
US Pop Airplay (Billboard)	16
US Rhythmic Airplay (Billboard)	4

=== Year-end charts ===
Year-end chart performance
Chart (2024)	Position
Philippines (Philippines Hot 100)	92
US Pop Airplay (Billboard)	50

== Certifications ==
Certifications
Region	Certification	Certified units/sales
Brazil (Pro-Música Brasil)	Diamond	160,000^{‡}
Canada (Music Canada)	Platinum	80,000^{‡}
France (SNEP)	Gold	100,000^{‡}
New Zealand (RMNZ)	Platinum	30,000^{‡}
Poland (ZPAV)	Gold	25,000^{‡}
United Kingdom (BPI)	Gold	400,000^{‡}
United States (RIAA)	2× Platinum	2,000,000^{‡}
Streaming
Central America (CFC)	Gold	3,500,000^{†}
Greece (IFPI Greece)	Platinum	2,000,000^{†}
^{‡} Sales+streaming figures based on certification alone.^{†} Streaming-only figures based on certification alone.

== Remix ==
"The Boy Is Mine" (remix)

Single by Ariana Grande, Brandy, and Monica

from the album Eternal Sunshine (Slightly Deluxe and Also Live)
- Released: June 21, 2024
- Genre: R&B
- Length: 3:33
- Label: Republic
- Songwriters: Ariana Grande; Brandy Norwood; David Park; Max Martin; Monica Arnold; Shintaro Yasuda
- Producers: Max Martin; Ilya; Shintaro Yasuda; DaviDior; Ariana Grande

Brandy singles chronology
"Christmas Party for Two" (2023)	"The Boy Is Mine" (remix) (2024)

Monica singles chronology
"Letters" (2023)	"The Boy Is Mine" (remix) (2024)

Audio sample
- An 18-second sample of Brandy and Monica's singing part during the bridge, which references their 1998 duet of the same name.: file; help

Lyric video
- "The Boy Is Mine" (remix) on YouTube

“It was all Ariana actually. What came first was the release of her version of [The Boy Is Mine], Brandy and I both loving it, and then the conversation ensued about us being in the video, and somewhere along the way the conversation was had about having us on the remix.”

— Monica on the conception of "The Boy Is Mine" remix.

On June 17, 2024, Grande announced a remix of "The Boy is Mine" with American singers Brandy and Monica, which was released on June 21. Brandy and Monica, whose 1998 duet of the same name inspired Grande's song, first made cameo appearances as newscasters in the music video for her song, which then led to their participation in the remix.

Prior to its release, Monica had been vocal about being against remixes of their track. However, she revealed that she immediately fell in love with Grande's version once she heard it. Grande worked with the duo on the song in FaceTime sessions which ended up including both of their families and helped Monica feel Grande's authentic desire to pay homage to their version. Monica also expressed that working on the remix helped to build a bridge between her and Brandy and resolve long-standing miscommunications between the two. Grande first teased the remix when she interpolated the hook of Brandy and Monica's original duet at the end of her performance of her song on The Tonight Show Starring Jimmy Fallon on June 6.

In the remix, the trio sing the pre-chorus and chorus of Grande's song together. The remix features a new bridge and a longer outro. For the bridge, Brandy and Monica sing lyrics alluding to their version of "The Boy Is Mine", saying, "How could you still be so disillusioned after all of this time? / I told you once before, I'll tell you once more, the boy is still mine."

=== Accolades ===
Awards and nominations for "The Boy Is Mine" (remix)
Organization	Year	Category	Result	Ref.
Grammy Awards	2025	Best Pop Duo/Group Performance	Nominated	

=== Track listing ===
Streaming/digital download – single

1. "The Boy Is Mine" (remix) – 3:33
2. "The Boy Is Mine" – 2:54
3. "The Boy Is Mine" (music video) – 6:16

=== Credits ===
- Ariana Grande – vocals, lyrics, composition, production
- Brandy Norwood – vocals, lyrics, composition
- Monica Arnold – vocals, lyrics, composition
- Max Martin – lyrics, production, composition, drums, keyboards, bass, programming, background vocals
- Ilya Salmanzadeh – production, composition, drums, keyboards, bass, programming, background vocals
- Shintaro Yasuda – production, composition, keyboards, drums, programming
- Davidior – production, composition, drums, programming
- Sam Holland – engineering
- Lou Carrao – engineering
- Eric Eylands – engineering assistance
- Rob Sellens – engineering assistance
- Randy Merrill – mastering
- Serban Ghenea – mixing
- Bryce Bordone – mixing assistance

=== Charts ===
==== Weekly charts ====
Weekly chart performance (remix)
Chart (2024)	Peak position
Global 200 (Billboard)	27
Japan Hot Overseas (Billboard Japan)	11
Malaysia (Billboard)	12
New Zealand (Recorded Music NZ)	40
Singapore (Billboard)	12
US Digital Song Sales (Billboard)	21
US Rhythmic Airplay (Billboard)	4

==== Year-end charts ====
Year-end chart performance (remix)
Chart (2024)	Position
Global 200 (Billboard)	195
US Rhythmic (Billboard)	37

== Release history ==
Release dates and formats
Region	Date	Format(s)	Version(s)	Label	Ref.
United States	June 11, 2024	Contemporary hit radio	Original	Republic	
Various	June 21, 2024	Digital download; streaming	Remix; original	Republic	
United States	June 25, 2024	Rhythmic contemporary radio; urban contemporary radio	Original	Republic	
Various	July 19, 2024	Digital download; streaming	Original; a cappella; instrumental; remix; remix a cappella	Republic	
United Kingdom	July 19, 2024	7-inch vinyl; cassette; CD	Original; a cappella	Island	
United States	July 19, 2024	7-inch vinyl; cassette; CD	Original; a cappella	Republic	
United States	July 19, 2024	CD	Remix	Republic	
United Kingdom	August 16, 2024	CD	Remix	Island	
