= Intro (End of the World) =

2024 song by Ariana Grande

Song by Ariana Grande

from the album Eternal Sunshine
- Released: March 8, 2024
- Studio: Jungle City (New York City)
- Length: 1:32; 2:41 (extended)
- Label: Republic
- Songwriters: Ariana Grande; Shintaro Yasuda; Nick Lee; Aaron Cheung
- Producers: Ariana Grande; Shintaro Yasuda; Nick Lee; Aaron Paris

Lyric visualizer
- "Intro (End of the World)" on YouTube

"Intro (End of the World)" is a song by American singer-songwriter Ariana Grande and the opening track of her seventh studio album, Eternal Sunshine (2024). She wrote and produced it with Shintaro Yasuda, Nick Lee, and Aaron Paris. The track puts emphasis on Grande's vocals over flanging guitars, soft strings, and harmonies. Its lyrics depict Grande's doubts and anxieties of an uncertain relationship. An extended and live version were released as part of the album's deluxe editions.

Most critics were generally positive for "Intro (End of the World)", commenting on its significance as the album's opening track and praising the production. The song reached number 19 on the Billboard Global 200 chart and the top ten of national charts in Malaysia, the Philippines, Singapore, and Vietnam. It charted in many other countries and received certifications in Brazil, Canada, New Zealand, the United Kingdom, and the United States.

== Background and release ==
Ariana Grande began work on her seventh studio album, Eternal Sunshine, following the 2023 SAG-AFTRA strike that halted the filming of the Wicked movies, wherein she portrays Glinda. Grande conceived it as somewhat of a concept album consisting of "different heightened pieces of the same story, of the same experience". She wrote "Intro (End of the World)" with Shintaro Yasuda, Nick Lee, and Aaron Paris. According to Lee, it was envisioned to be a companion to the album's closing track, "Ordinary Things".

"Intro (End of the World)" was one of the first three songs announced for Eternal Sunshine on January 27, 2024, and became available alongside the album as its opening track by Republic Records on March 8, 2024. A live version was surprise-released as part of Eternal Sunshine's Slightly Deluxe and Also Live edition on October 31. It was accompanied by a live performance video, which was the first installment in a seven-part live series of the album. Grande and a 10-piece band performed an orchestral rendition of the track with new vocal runs from her—Billboard's Hannah Dailey said that she adds "fresh emotion". An extended version of the song was released in the album's Brighter Days Ahead deluxe edition on March 28, 2025. It was also featured in the edition's accompanying short film of the same name.

== Composition ==
"Intro (End of the World)", at 1 minute and 32 seconds long, was recorded at Jungle City Studios in New York City. Grande produced the song with Yasuda, Lee, and Paris, the three of whom handled programming. Yasuda played keyboards, Lee played keyboards and trombone, and Paris played bass, guitar, synthesizer, and violin. Lou Carrao and Sam Holland engineered the track with assistance from Eric Eyland. It was mixed by Serban Ghenea at MixStar Studios in Virginia Beach with assistance from Bryce Bordone and mastered by Randy Merrill at Sterling Sound in Edgewater.

"Intro (End of the World)" emphasizes on Grande's vocals. Beginning with static and crackling sounds from a vinyl, the song incorporates flanging guitars with doo-wop chords and understated strums, soft strings, and harmonies. It also includes a trombone filtered through an effect that makes the horns create a "washy, vibey, wavy sound", according to Lee. Grande's vocals throughout are subtle and sensual, escalating as they lead into a violin-driven chorus. She lowers her vocal register when singing the lyric, "If it all ended tomorrow, would I be the one on your mind?". In Rolling Stone, Rob Sheffield believed the track contained influences from the Beatles' album Rubber Soul (1965) due to its "psychedelic murk". Josiah Eleazar Antonio of ABS-CBN News thought the production resembles that of Disney's theme songs, while Manila Bulletin's Punch Liwanag said that the song had "neo-soul strains".

The lyrics of "Intro (End of the World)" are about the ponders of whether a lover cares for you equally as you do for them. In it, Grande doubts a tormented relationship that has slowly been fading, starting the song with a contemplative question, "How can I tell if I'm in the right relationship?". She proceeds to pose similar questions with no hesitation: "Aren't you really supposed to know that shit?/Feel it in your bones and own that shit?" Throughout the track, Grande expresses her anxieties regarding the interactions with a partner and the likelihood of the relationship coming to an end. Although content with life's unpredictability, she is dubious if she can able to recognize a long-lasting love. Several reviewers commented that "Ordinary Things" was an answer to the song's question whether Grande is with the right person. (Note: Attributed to Kristen S. Hé of Billboard, Callie Ahlgrim of Business Insider, Hanif Abdurraqib of The New Yorker, and Justin Curto of Vulture)

The extended version, at 2 minutes and 41 seconds long, features two additional verses which are accompanied by spare, twinkling keys and hazy synthesizers. It expands on the lyrics about Grande's contemplations and questions of the relationship by exploring its dissolution. Billboard's Kyle Denis said that it "subtly [calls] back to the overarching theme of memory erasure" that establishes the album's storyline. Writing for Out, Taylor Henderson found it to entirely transform the song's feel and believed that the final lyric ("I wish I could un-need you, so I did") evoked the movie Eternal Sunshine of the Spotless Mind. For Variety's Steven J. Horowitz, the version modifies the song "from a sunny opening salvo celebrating romance into a method of preservation".

== Critical reception ==
Most critics were generally positive towards "Intro (End of the World)". There were comments about the song's significance as the opening track of Eternal Sunshine. Moses Jeanfrancois of Beats Per Minute and Denis deemed it an effective opener for the album. Tomás Mier of Rolling Stone said that the song sets much of the lyrical themes of Eternal Sunshine of "healing-from-a-breakup". Brittany Spanos from the same publication believed that it was where Grande "gets the most intense feelings of heartbreak" on the album. In a mixed review, Callie Ahlgrim from Business Insider thought the track "sneakily foreshadows" the themes of Eternal Sunshine but wrote that it would not work as a standalone song.

The song's production was a subject of praise. Mier and Teen Vogue's editors Aiyana Ishmael and Honestine Fraser wrote that it was "dreamy". In a ranking of Eternal Sunshine, Denis listed the song as tenth and said that it contained a "sense of imminent doom that warrants" a "flashy" title of "End of the World" and a vocal performance "equal parts cavalier and utterly distraught". Sputnikmusic's staff picked the track as an example of one of the album's "subtle musical flourishes", while Christian Allaire of Vogue said the production "kind of sounds the way a warm hug on a cold winter's day feels". Praising the lyrics, Billboard's Andrew Unterberger and Kristen S. Hé placed the track as 36th on the publication's ranking of Grande's 171 songs, writing that it was "a complete portrait of who Ariana Grande is now" and that "she's never sounded more at peace".

Reactions for the extended version were generally favorable. Horowitz wrote that it was much finer to be a "completed thought than a truncated idea". Placing the version fifth on his track-by-track ranking of the deluxe edition, Denis thought Grande made the song a tad sweeter with it. Martina Rexrode from Screen Rant believed that the version's purpose on the deluxe edition was perfectly handled and essential for its content, though she preferred the original part which was attributed to it being last on her track-by-track ranking.

== Commercial performance ==
Following its initial release in 2024, "Intro (End of the World)" entered at number 24 on the Billboard Global 200 chart. In the Philippines (PH), the track reached two national charts: PH Songs (peaking at 4) and the PH Hot 100 (43), where it placed 35th on the chart's year-end issue of 2024. The song reached the top ten in other Southeast Asian countries—Singapore (at 5) and Malaysia (6)—and charted in New Zealand (peaking at 31), Canada (37), Portugal (55), Australia (71), and France (101). In the United States, the track debuted and peaked at number 38 on the Billboard Hot 100, where it helped made Grande the female artist with the third most chart entries at 85, tying with Beyoncé. On non-national charts, the song reached Malaysia's Top 20 Most Streamed International Singles (at 5), Greece's Top 100 Digital Singles International (35), and the United Kingdom's Official Audio Streaming Chart (42).

In April 2025, the track reached a new peak of number 19 on the Global 200 and entered in the national charts of Vietnam (peaking at 9), Thailand (18), the United Kingdom (26), and Ireland (33). In the PH, it re-entered the PH Hot 100 at a new peak of number eight and debuted at that spot on the Official PH Chart. The song once more charted in Malaysia's Top 20 Most Streamed International Singles, as well as in the national charts of Singapore and the United States. It has been certified in four countries, receiving silver in the United Kingdom, platinum in Canada, New Zealand, and the US, and triple platinum in Brazil.

== Personnel ==
Credits are adapted from the liner notes of Eternal Sunshine.

- Ariana Grande – lead vocals, songwriting, production, background vocals
- Shintaro Yasuda – songwriting, production, programming, keyboards
- Nick Lee – songwriting, production, programming, keyboards, trombone
- Aaron Paris – songwriting, production, programming, bass, guitar, synthesizer, violin
- Sam Holland – engineering
- Lou Carrao – engineering
- Eric Eyland – engineering assistance
- Serban Ghenea – mixing
- Bryce Bordone – mixing assistance
- Randy Merrill – mastering

== Charts ==
=== Weekly charts ===
2024 weekly chart performance for "Intro (End of the World)"
| Chart (2024) | Peak position |
|---|---|
| Australia (ARIA) | 71 |
| Canada Hot 100 (Billboard) | 37 |
| France (SNEP) | 101 |
| Global 200 (Billboard) | 24 |
| Greece International (IFPI) | 35 |
| Indonesia (Billboard) | 4 |
| Malaysia (Billboard) | 6 |
| Malaysia International (RIM) | 5 |
| New Zealand (Recorded Music NZ) | 31 |
| Philippines (Billboard) | 4 |
| Philippines (Philippines Hot 100) | 43 |
| Portugal (AFP) | 55 |
| Singapore (RIAS) | 5 |
| UK Streaming (OCC) | 42 |
| US Billboard Hot 100 | 38 |

2025 weekly chart performance for "Intro (End of the World)" (Note: Combined chart statistics for both "Intro (End of the World)" and its extended version.)
| Chart (2025) | Peak position |
|---|---|
| Global 200 (Billboard) | 19 |
| Ireland (IRMA) | 33 |
| Malaysia International (RIM) | 7 |
| Philippines (Philippines Hot 100) | 8 |
| Philippines (IFPI) | 8 |
| Singapore (RIAS) | 10 |
| Thailand (IFPI) | 18 |
| UK Singles (Official Charts) | 26 |
| US Billboard Hot 100 | 42 |
| Vietnam (IFPI) | 9 |

=== Year-end chart ===
Year-end chart performance for "Intro (End of the World)"
| Chart (2024) | Position |
|---|---|
| Philippines (Philippines Hot 100) | 35 |

== Certifications ==
Certifications for "Intro (End of the World)"
| Region | Certification | Certified units/sales |
|---|---|---|
| Brazil (Pro-Música Brasil) | 3× Platinum | 120,000^{‡} |
| Canada (Music Canada) | Platinum | 80,000^{‡} |
| New Zealand (RMNZ) | Platinum | 30,000^{‡} |
| United Kingdom (BPI) | Silver | 200,000^{‡} |
| United States (RIAA) | Platinum | 1,000,000^{‡} |
^{‡} Sales+streaming figures based on certification alone.
