= Christian Breslauer =

American music video director

- Breslauer in 2023
- Born: Christian Kurt Breslauer
- Occupations: Music video director, Commercial director
- Years active: 2013–present

Christian Breslauer is an American music video director. He is known for his work with Katy Perry, Doja Cat, Lil Nas X, Jisoo, Lizzo, Lisa, SZA and Ariana Grande. He has been nominated five consecutive times for the MTV Video Music Award for Best Direction (2022–2026).

Breslauer was nominated for the Grammy Award for Best Music Video at the 69th Annual Grammy Awards for Ariana Grande’s “Hate That I Made You Love Me.”

== Career ==
In 2026, Breslauer served as director of Ariana Grande’s The Eternal Sunshine Tour. The production received overwhelmingly positive reviews from critics, who particularly praised its cinematic staging and storytelling.

== Filmography ==
=== Music videos ===
Year	Title	Artist	Roles	Notes
2017	"Can't Help Myself"	Jake Miller	Director	Co-directed with Edgar Esteves.
2018	"Issues"	PnB Rock featuring Russ	Producer	
2018	"X-Files"	Jordan Hollywood	Director	
2018	"Fellings Aside"	BamSavage	Director, producer, cinematographer, editor	
2018	"Cars and Boys"	Avonlea	Cinematographer	
2018	"Don't Know Why"	Youngeen Ace	Cinematographer	
2018	"Wanted"	Youngeen Ace featuring YoungBoy Never Broke Again	Cinematographer	
2018	"Let Me Find Out"	Jordan Hollywood featuring Lil Baby	Director, cinematographer	
2018	"Bra Fie"	Fuse ODG featuring Damian Marley	Cinematographer	
2018	"Leave Me"	Jordan Hollywood	Director	
2018	"Finally"	Jordan Hollywood	Director, cinematographer	
2018	"Opera"	D. Savage	Director, cinematographer	
2018	"Missin You Crazy"	Russ	Creative director	
2019	"Explosion"	Jordan Hollywood	Director	
2019	"Getcha Roll On"	T-Pain featuring Tory Lanez	Cinematographer	
2019	"Tic Boom"	Leikeli47	Cinematographer	
2019	"G.O.D. (Grind or Die)"	Flosstradamus and Blvk Jvck featuring Leat'eq	Director, cinematographer	
2019	"Stranger"	Avonlea	Cinematographer	
2019	"A Million Times"	T-Pain featuring O.T. Genasis	Cinematographer	
2019	"Wait for You"	Jake Miller	Cinematographer	
2019	"Pure Cocaine"	Lil Baby	Cinematographer	
2019	"Freaky"	Tory Lanez	Director, cinematographer	
2019	"All I Want"	T-Pain featuring Flipp Dinero	Cinematographer	
2019	"Aint Goin Back"	Russ	Cinematographer	
2019	"So Long"	Yungeen Ace	Director, cinematographer	
2019	"Fallin"	Derez De'Shon featuring Russ	Cinematographer	
2019	"All I Want"	Russ featuring Davido	Cinematographer	
2019	"Civil War"	Russ	Cinematographer	
2019	"Under Enemy Arms"	Trippie Redd	Director, cinematographer	
2019	"Broke Leg"	Tory Lanez, Quavo and Tyga	Director, cinematographer	Co-directed with Tory Lanez.
2019	"Woah"	Rich the Kid featuring Miguel and Ty Dolla Sign	Executive production	Executive production handled with Edgar Esteves.
2019	"Taking Over"	JayDaYoungan	Cinematographer	
2019	"Blow My Mind"	Davido featuring Chris Brown	Cinematographer	
2019	"Forever"	Tory Lanez	Cinematographer, executive producer	Executive production handled with Edgar Esteves.
2019	"Slide"	Le'Veon Bell	Director, executive producer	Executive production handled with Edgar Esteves.
2019	"All Night Long"	YFN Lucci featuring Trey Songz	Cinematorgrapher	
2019	"Heat"	Chris Brown featuring Gunna	Cinematorgrapher	
2019	"Jerry Sprunger"	Tory Lanez and T-Pain	Director, executive producer, cinematographer	Co-directed with MidJordan, executive production handled with Edgar Esteves.
2019	"Step Harder"	Yungeen Ace	Director, cinematographer	
2019	"Tongue Tied"	Marshmello, Yungblud and Blackbear	Director, cinematographer	
2019	"Tip Toe"	Roddy Ricch featuring A Boogie wit da Hoodie	Director	
2020	"Boom Boom Room"	Roddy Rich	Director, cinematographer	
2020	"The Box"	Roddy Rich	Director, executive producer	Co-directed with Roddy Rich, executive production handled with Edgar Esteves.
2020	"Stupid Again"	Tory Lanez	Director, executive producer	Executive production handled with Edgar Esteves.
2020	"Strawberry Lipstick"	Yungblud	Director, executive producer, cinematographer	Executive production handled with Edgar Esteves.
2020	"Nightrider"	Arizona Zervas	Director	
2020	"Bang Bang"	Chief Keef and Mike Will Made It	Director, cinematographer	Co-directed with Edgar Esteves.
2020	"Take You Dancing"	Jason Derulo	Director, executive producer	Executive production handled with Edgar Esteves.
2020	"The Business"	Tiësto	Director	
2020	"Too Much"	Marshmello and Imanbek featuring Usher	Director, cinematographer, cameo appearance	
2020	"Errbody"	Lil Baby	Director	Co-directed with Edgar Esteves and Daps.
2020	"Dreamland"	Morray	Director, cinematographer	
2021	"Skat"	Tory Lanez and DaBaby	Director, cinematographer, cameo appearance	
2021	"Big Tipper"	Tory Lanez featuring Melii and Lil Wayne	Director, executive producer	Co-directed with MidJordan, executive production handled with Michael Breslauer.
2021	"F.E.E.L.S."	Tory Lanez and Chris Brown	Director, executive producer, cinematographer	
2021	"Sacrifice"	Bebe Rexha	Director, executive producer	Executive production handled with Luga Podesta.
2021	"Streets"	Doja Cat	Director, executive producer, writer	
2021	"Sabotage"	Bebe Rexha	Director, executive producer	Executive production handled with Luga Podesta.
2021	"Break My Heart Myself"	Bebe Rexha featuring Travis Barker	Director, executive producer	Executive production handled with Luga Podesta.
2021	"Leave Before You Love Me"	Marshmello and Jonas Brothers	Director, executive producer	Executive production handled with Luga Podesta, Andrew Lerios, and Brandon Bonfiglio.
2021	"I Like Dat"	T-Pain and Kehlani	Director	
2021	"Run Run"	Shenseea	Director, executive producer	Executive production handled with Luga Podesta, Andrew Lerios, and Brandon Bonfiglio.
2021	"Better Believe"	Belly, the Weeknd, and Young Thug	Director, executive producer	Executive production handled with Luga Podesta, Andrew Lerios, and Brandon Bonfiglio.
2021	"Industry Baby"	Lil Nas X and Jack Harlow	Director, executive producer	Executive production handled with Luga Podesta, Andrew Lerios, and Brandon Bonfiglio.
2021	"I Like That"	Bazzi	Director, executive producer	Executive production handled with Luga Podesta.
2021	"Don't Be Shy"	Tiësto and Karol G	Director, executive producer	Executive production handled with Luga Podesta.
2021	"Who's in Your Head"	Jonas Brothers	Director	
2021	"The Motto"	Tiësto and Ava Max	Director, executive producer	Executive production handled with Luga Podesta.
2021	"Die for You"	The Weeknd	Director, executive producer	
2022	"Light Switch"	Charlie Puth	Director, executive producer	Executive production handled with Luga Podesta, Andrew Lerios, and Brandon Bonfiglio.
2022	"Boys Don't Cry"	Anitta	Director	Co-directed with Anitta.
2022	"Freaky Deaky"	Tyga and Doja Cat	Director, executive producer	Executive production handled with Luga Podesta, Andrew Lerios, and Brandon Bonfiglio.
2022	"The Funeral"	Yungblud	Director	
2022	"About Damn Time"	Lizzo	Director	
2022	"Thousand Miles"	The Kid Laroi	Director	
2022	"Distraction"	Polo G	Director	
2022	"Numb"	Marshmello and Khalid	Director	
2022	"Dope"	John Legend featuring JID	Director	
2022	"Tropa"	Anitta featuring Luck Muzik	Director	
2022	"Honey"	John Legend featuring Muni Long	Director	
2022	"2 Be Loved (Am I Ready)"	Lizzo	Director	Co-directed with Lizzo.
2022	"All She Wanna Do"	John Legend featuring Saweetie	Director	
2023	"Kill Bill"	SZA	Director	
2023	"Special"	Lizzo	Director	
2023	"Creepin' (Remix)"	Metro Boomin, the Weeknd, Diddy and 21 Savage	Director	
2023	"All Nighter"	Tiësto	Director	
2023	"Fell in Love"	Marshmello and Brent Faiyaz	Director	
2023	"How We Roll"	Ciara featuring Chris Brown	Director	
2023	"Summer Too Hot"	Chris Brown	Director	
2023	"Demons"	Doja Cat	Director	Co-directed with Doja Cat.
2023	"Money Come"	Iggy Azalea	Director	
2023	"Chasing That Feeling"	Tomorrow X Together	Director	
2024	"Yes, And?"	Ariana Grande	Director	
2024	"We Can't Be Friends (Wait for Your Love)"	Ariana Grande	Director	
2024	"The Boy Is Mine"	Ariana Grande	Director	
2025	"Earthquake"	Jisoo	Director	
2025	"Fxck Up the World" (Vixi solo version)	Lisa	Director	
2025	"Pleasure"	Jolin Tsai	Director	
2025	"Brighter Days Ahead"	Ariana Grande	Director	Short film; Co-directed and co-written with Ariana Grande.
2025	"DIY"	Jolin Tsai	Director	
2025	"Lose My Mind"	Don Toliver featuring Doja Cat	Director	
2025	"Bandaids"	Katy Perry	Director	Co-directed with Perry.
2026	"Hate That I Made You Love Me"	Ariana Grande	Director, Executive producer	Short film; Co-directed and co-written with Ariana Grande.
2026	"Watch It Burn"	Katy Perry	Director	
2026	"Petal"	Ariana Grande	Director	

== Awards and nominations ==
Year	Award	Category	Nominated work	Result	Ref.
2021	UK Music Video Awards	Best Pop Video - International	"Industry Baby"	Won	
2022	MTV Video Music Awards	Best Direction	"Industry Baby"	Nominated	
2022	Cannes Lions International Festival of Creativity	Excellence in music video	"Industry Baby"	Silver	
2023	BET Awards	Video of the Year	"Kill Bill"	Won	
2023	MTV Video Music Awards	Best Direction	"Kill Bill"	Nominated	
2023	MTV Europe Music Awards	Best Video	"Kill Bill"	Nominated	
2024	Clio Awards	Music Videos	"Kill Bill"	Silver	
2024	Clio Awards	Direction	"Kill Bill"	Silver	
2024	Clio Awards	Music Videos	"Demons"	Bronze	
2024	MTV Video Music Awards	Best Direction	"We Can't Be Friends (Wait for Your Love)"	Nominated	
2024	MTV Europe Music Awards	Best Video	"We Can't Be Friends (Wait for Your Love)"	Nominated	
2025	MTV Video Music Awards	Best Direction	"Brighter Days Ahead"	Nominated	
2026	Golden Melody Awards	Best Music Video	"Pleasure"	Nominated	
2026	MTV Video Music Awards	Best Direction	"Hate That I Made You Love Me"	Nominated	
2027	Grammy Awards	Best Music Video	"Hate That I Made You Love Me"	Nominated	
