= Tommy Brown (music producer) =

American record producer

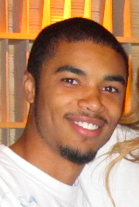
- Brown in 2011

Background information
- Also known as: TBHits
- Born: Thomas Lee Brown; May 1, 1986 (age 40); Pittsburgh, Pennsylvania, U.S.
- Genres: Pop; R&B; hip hop; trap
- Occupations: Record producer; songwriter; rapper
- Years active: 2008–present
- Labels: Vietom; Universal; Champagne Therapy

Thomas Lee Brown (born May 1, 1986 in Pittsburgh, Pennsylvania), also known as TBHits, is an American record producer, songwriter and rapper. He is best known for his work with Ariana Grande, having been credited on six of her studio albums, as well as her Christmas project Christmas & Chill and the 2019 Charlie's Angels: Original Motion Picture Soundtrack. Brown often co-writes in tandem with Victoria Monét, and was mentored by fellow producers Roy "Royalty" Hamilton and Rodney Jerkins in his early career.

== Producing and songwriting ==
Before entering the music industry, Brown worked at Sears in Atlanta, Georgia. He would hand out CDs of his songs, eventually catching the attention of artist Gorilla Zoe, who invited Brown to work in the studio with him. In 2008, Brown joined the production group Darkchild, where he met future collaborator and fellow upcoming writer Victoria Monét. During this period, he worked with artists like Jennifer Lopez, Wyclef Jean, and The Black Eyed Peas, notably producing their song "Just Can't Get Enough". In 2012, Brown signed an independent publishing deal with Sony/ATV Music Publishing. He currently lives in Los Angeles, producing tracks for established artists including Travis Scott, Cee Lo Green, Nas, The Weeknd, T.I., Chris Brown, and Teyana Taylor, among others.

In 2013, Both Brown and Monét met Broadway and Nickelodeon alum Grande at a writing session for fellow artist Nick Jonas, forming an inseparable bond. Both would subsequently appear on her debut studio album Yours Truly. Brown would continue to contribute multiple tracks to each future Grande album, including 2018 healing project Sweetener. Less than six months later in 2019, Brown contributed five songs to Grande's Thank U, Next after several weeks of writing in collaboration with Grande, Monét, and mutual friend Tayla Parx. He next created his Champagne Therapy Music Group publishing imprint in collaboration with Universal Music. In 2021, the relationship between Brown and Universal further expanded to include a Global Publishing deal.

In 2025, Brown appeared on the Netflix music docu-reality series Hitmakers.

== Discography ==
Year	Song	Artist	Album
2010	"Just Can't Get Enough"	Black Eyed Peas	The Beginning
2011	"Just A Friend"	Jasmine V	Non-album single
2012	"Write It On A Wall"	Xai	Non-album single
2012	"Sin City"	GOOD Music	Cruel Summer
2012	"Introduction"	T.I.	Trouble Man: Heavy Is the Head
2012	"Live On Tonight" (featuring Victoria Monét)	T.I.	Trouble Man: Heavy Is the Head
2012	"Who You're Around"	Meek Mill	Dreams and Nightmares
2013	"36"	2 Chainz	B.O.A.T.S. II: Me Time
2013	"Malice In Wonderland"	Victoria Monét	Non-album single
2013	"Déjà Vu"	Coco Jones	Made Of
2013	"Honeymoon Avenue"	Ariana Grande	Yours Truly
2013	"Daydreamin'"	Ariana Grande	Yours Truly
2013	"Visual Love"	Chrisette Michele	Better
2013	"You Wouldn't Understand" (featuring Victoria Monét)	Nas	Life Is Good
2013	"Animal" (w/ Travi$ Scott, B.o.B & T.I.)	Grand Hustle Records	G.D.O.D. (Get Dough or Die)
2013	"Find My Love"	Eric Bellinger	In The Meantime
2013	"Come Over"	Eric Bellinger	In The Meantime
2014	"Never Be Lonely"	Eric Bellinger	In The Meantime
2014	"Made In China"	Victoria Monét	Nightmares & Lullabies - Act 1
2014	"We Are People"	Victoria Monét	Nightmares & Lullabies - Act 1
2014	"Backyard"	Victoria Monét	Nightmares & Lullabies - Act 1
2014	"For The Trill"	Victoria Monét	Nightmares & Lullabies - Act 1
2014	"Save Me"	Victoria Monét	Non-album single
2014	"Would You Wait"	Victoria Monét	Non-album single
2014	"Intro"	Ariana Grande	My Everything
2014	"My Everything"	Ariana Grande	My Everything
2014	"Only 1"	Ariana Grande	My Everything
2014	"Cadillac Song"	Ariana Grande	My Everything
2014	"Ya Digg" (w/ Shad da God, Travi$ Scott, Spodee & T.I.)	Grand Hustle Records	G.D.O.D. II
2014	"New National Anthem" (featuring Skylar Grey)	T.I.	Paperwork
2014	"Stay"	T.I.	Paperwork
2014	"Lean On Me" (with Victoria Monét)	B.o.B.	No Genre 2
2014	"Drunk Texting" (featuring Jhené Aiko)	Chris Brown	X
2015	"Everlasting Love"	Fifth Harmony	Reflection
2015	"We Know"	Fifth Harmony	Reflection
2015	"A Little More" (featuring Victoria Monet)	Machine Gun Kelly	General Admission
2015	"Therapy"	Machine Gun Kelly	General Admission
2015	"Intro"	Ariana Grande	Christmas & Chill
2015	"Wit It This Christmas"	Ariana Grande	Christmas & Chill
2015	"December"	Ariana Grande	Christmas & Chill
2015	"Not Just on Christmas"	Ariana Grande	Christmas & Chill
2015	"True Love"	Ariana Grande	Christmas & Chill
2015	"Winter Things"	Ariana Grande	Christmas & Chill
2015	"More Of You"	Victoria Monét	Nightmares & Lullabies Act 2
2015	"Will I Do"	Victoria Monét	Nightmares & Lullabies Act 2
2015	"Good Time x Trouble	Victoria Monét	Nightmares & Lullabies Act 2
2015	"See The Light"	Victoria Monét	Nightmares & Lullabies Act 2
2015	"Cupid"	Victoria Monét	Nightmares & Lullabies Act 2
2015	"90's Babies"	Victoria Monét	Nightmares & Lullabies Act 2
2015	"High Love"	Victoria Monét	Nightmares & Lullabies Act 2
2015	"Maybe Never"	Eric Bellinger	Cuffing Season
2015	"Trippin On Me"	Tommy Brown	
2016	"Memories Faded"	TWENTY88	TWENTY88
2016	"Yo te amo a ti" / "I Want You" (as Thomas Brown)	Martina Stoessel & Jorge Blanco	Tini
2016	"Moonlight"	Ariana Grande	Dangerous Woman
2016	"Be Alright"	Ariana Grande	Dangerous Woman
2016	"Let Me Love You" (featuring Lil Wayne)	Ariana Grande	Dangerous Woman
2016	"Leave Me Lonely" (featuring Macy Gray)	Ariana Grande	Dangerous Woman
2016	"I Don't Care"	Ariana Grande	Dangerous Woman
2016	"Knew Better / Forever Boy"	Ariana Grande	Dangerous Woman
2016	"Step On Up"	Ariana Grande	Dangerous Woman
2016	"Take Da Wheel"	T.I.	Us or Else: Letter to the System
2016	"Get My Shit Together"	Big Sean	Non-album single
2016	"Forgive Me Father" (featuring Meghan Trainor, Wiz Khalifa & Wale)	DJ Khaled	Major Key
2016	"Better"	Meghan Trainor	Thank You
2016	"No Pressure"	Pia Mia	Non-album single
2016	"Night Bag"	Eric Bellinger	Choose Up Season
2016	"No Way"	Fifth Harmony	7/27
2017	"Bridges"	Fifth Harmony	Fifth Harmony
2017	"Rock Your Body"	Chris Brown	Heartbreak On A Full Moon
2017	"One At A Time"	Alex Aiono & T-Pain	
2017	"Poison"	Njomza	Sad For You
2017	"Someone Like Me"	Njomza	Sad For You
2017	"Perfect Fit"	Njomza	Sad For You
2017	"Who Died"	T-Pain	Oblivion
2018	"Better Off"	Ariana Grande	Sweetener
2018	"Goodnight n Go"	Ariana Grande	Sweetener
2018	"Pete Davidson"	Ariana Grande	Sweetener
2018	"You" (featuring Teyana Taylor)	T.I.	Dime Trap
2018	"Dinero" (featuring DJ Khaled & Cardi B)	J.Lo	Non-album single
2018	"Freak"	Victoria Monét	Life After Love, Pt. 1
2018	"Sugar Daddy"	Macy Gray	Ruby
2018	"Witness"	Macy Gray	Ruby
2018	"Just Like Jenny"	Macy Gray	Ruby
2018	"White Man"	Macy Gray	Ruby
2018	"Thank U, Next"	Ariana Grande	Thank U, Next
2019	"7 Rings"	Ariana Grande	Thank U, Next
2019	"Needy"	Ariana Grande	Thank U, Next
2019	"NASA"	Ariana Grande	Thank U, Next
2019	"Make Up"	Ariana Grande	Thank U, Next
2019	"Boyfriend"	Ariana Grande & Social House	Everything Changed...
2019	"Got Her Own"	Ariana Grande & Victoria Monét	Charlie's Angels
2019	"Love Me"	Stanaj	Non-album single
2019	"Make Believe"	Juice Wrld	Death Race for Love
2019	"Usually"	DaniLeigh	My Present
2020	"Dominican Mami"	DaniLeigh	Non-album single
2020	"Rich"	Megan Thee Stallion	Suga
2020	"You Can't Hold My Heart"	Monsta X	All About Luv
2020	"Ice Cream" (with Selena Gomez)	Blackpink	The Album
2020	"Bet You Wanna" (featuring Cardi B)	Blackpink	The Album
2020	"Holy" (featuring Chance the Rapper)	Justin Bieber	Justice
2020	"Positions"	Ariana Grande	Positions
2020	"34+35"	Ariana Grande	Positions
2020	"shut up"	Ariana Grande	Positions
2020	"Motive" (with Doja Cat)	Ariana Grande	Positions
2020	"just like magic"	Ariana Grande	Positions
2020	"Off the Table" (with The Weeknd)	Ariana Grande	Positions
2020	"six thirty"	Ariana Grande	Positions
2020	"safety net" (featuring Ty Dolla Sign)	Ariana Grande	Positions
2020	"my hair"	Ariana Grande	Positions
2020	"nasty"	Ariana Grande	Positions
2020	"west side"	Ariana Grande	Positions
2020	"love language"	Ariana Grande	Positions
2020	"obvious"	Ariana Grande	Positions
2020	"POV"	Ariana Grande	Positions
2021	"someone like you - interlude"	Ariana Grande	Positions (Deluxe)
2021	"test drive"	Ariana Grande	Positions (Deluxe)
2021	"34+35 Remix" (featuring Doja Cat & Megan Thee Stallion)	Ariana Grande	Positions (Deluxe)
2021	"worst behavior"	Ariana Grande	Positions (Deluxe)
2021	"main thing"	Ariana Grande	Positions (Deluxe)
2021	"What Happens Here"	Zara Larsson	Poster Girl
2021	"Met Him Last Night" (featuring Ariana Grande)	Demi Lovato	Dancing with the Devil... the Art of Starting Over
2021	"Scientist"	Twice	Formula of Love: O+T=<3
2021	"Take It Home"	Mabel	Pokémon 25: The Album
2022	"Is There Someone Else"	The Weeknd	Dawn FM
2022	"Starry Eyes"	The Weeknd	Dawn FM
2022	"Don Quixote"	Seventeen	Face the Sun
2022	"World"	Seventeen	Sector 17
2022	"In the Kitchen"	Reneé Rapp	Everything to Everyone
2023	"A Dona Aranha"	Luísa Sonza	Escândalo Íntimo
2024	"1:59" (featuring Gunna)	Normani	Dopamine
2024	"Candy Paint"	Normani	Dopamine
2024	"Give Me That"	WayV	Give Me That
2024	"Power"	G-Dragon	Übermensch
2024	"Body"	Meovv	Non-album single
2024	"Drip"	Izna	N/a
2025	"I Can't Wait to Get There"	The Weeknd	Hurry Up Tomorrow
2025	"+82 Pressin'" (featuring Haechan)	Mark	The Firstfruit
2025	"Different"	Le Sserafim	Non-album single
2025	"Wicked"	AllDay Project	Non-album single
2025	"Commas"	Girlset	Non-album single
2025	"Top Down"	3Quency	Non-album single
2026	"Fxxxboy"	Blackpink	Deadline
2026	"Tropical Paradise"	Luísa Sonza	Brutal Paraíso
2026	"Revenge"	Meovv	Bite Now

== Awards and nominations ==
Year	Ceremony	Award	Result	Ref
2020	62nd Annual Grammy Awards	Grammy Award for Record of the Year ("Thank U, Next")	Nominated	
2020	62nd Annual Grammy Awards	Grammy Award for Album of the Year (Thank U, Next)	Nominated	
2020	ASCAP Pop Music Awards	Award-Winning Songs ("7 Rings")	Won	
2020	ASCAP Pop Music Awards	Award-Winning Songs ("Thank U, Next")	Won	
2022	64th Annual Grammy Awards	Grammy Award for Album of the Year (Justice (Triple Chucks Deluxe))	Nominated	
2022	ASCAP Pop Music Awards	Award-Winning Songs ("34+35")	Won	
2022	ASCAP Pop Music Awards	Award-Winning Songs ("Positions")	Won	
2022	ASCAP Pop Music Awards	Award-Winning Songs ("POV")	Won	
2022	ASCAP Pop Music Awards	Award-Winning Songs ("Holy")	Won	
