= POV (song) =

2021 single by Ariana Grande

- Official live performance artwork

Single by Ariana Grande

from the album Positions
- Released: March 23, 2021
- Recorded: September 2020
- Studio: Champagne Therapy (Los Angeles)
- Genre: R&B
- Length: 3:21
- Label: Republic
- Songwriters: Ariana Grande; Tayla Parx
- Producers: Mr. Franks; Oliver Frid; Tommy Brown

Ariana Grande singles chronology
"34+35" (remix) (2021)	"POV" (2021)	"Met Him Last Night" (2021)

Lyric video
- "POV" on YouTube

"POV" (acronym for "point of view") is a song by American singer Ariana Grande. It was released on March 23, 2021 by Republic Records as the third single from her sixth studio album Positions (2020). Grande wrote the song with Tayla Parx, and it was produced by Mr. Franks, Oliver "Junior" Frid and Tommy Brown.

Following the release of Positions, "POV" debuted at number 40 on the US Billboard Hot 100, later peaking at number 27. It reached number three on the US Mainstream Top 40, and aided Grande in becoming the first artist to post three concurrent top ten hits in the chart's history. In addition, the song reached top 20 in the charts of Ireland, New Zealand, Puerto Rico Anglo and the United Kingdom, as well as the top ten in Rolling Stone's Top 100 chart.

A dance lyric video for the song, directed by Director X, was released on April 30, 2021. A Vevo exclusive live performance of "POV" was released two months later on June 21.

== Background and composition ==
On October 24, 2020, Grande released the track list of Positions via social media, revealing "POV" as the fourteenth and final track on the album.

"POV" is an R&B ballad with a quiet arrangement accompanied by cello and viola. It has a length of three minutes and twenty-one seconds, and is written with a tempo of 132 beats per minute in the key of E♭ major, while Grande's vocals range from a low note of B♭_{3} to a high note of G_{5}. The song opens with rainfall sound effects. On the last line, Grande's voice follows a descending melody as the music fades out.

Lyrically, the song explores the idea of switching places with a lover, and how love can smooth out perceived imperfections. In the track, Grande mentions how deeply her lover, Dalton Gomez, understands her and loves her, how much more understood and adored the singer feels through his eyes, as well as her insecurities, her initial fear of starting a relationship again, and how Gomez has helped her overcome it. She also expresses joy for being accepted for her "ugly", and makes a plea to love herself just as much as her partner loves her.

== Critical reception ==
Jason Lipshutz of Billboard ranked "POV" as his top song from Positions, describing the track as one that "breaks the mold of a traditional R&B ballad", calling it "a breathtaking show-stopper" and "the most elegant–and arguably the flat-out best–deployment of full-on balladry in her catalog to date". He particularly praised the song's lyrical concept, which he regards as an integral part in what makes the song "work so well". Vulture's Justin Curto named the song "one of Grande's best performances on Positions", deeming it "an ecstatic finale presenting her whole range of whistle tones, belts, and runs in just three and a half minutes". Writing for Consequence of Sound, Mary Siroky chose "POV" as one of the three "essential tracks" from the album, and considered it "perhaps the best showcase for the belt listeners often crave from her". Chris DeVille of Stereogum wrote in his review of the album: "Album closer 'POV' is the sort of churchy traditionalist ballad Carey or Whitney Houston once slayed, and Grande proves herself a worthy heir."

=== Year-end lists ===
Callie Ahlgrim of Insider ranked "POV" as the 14th best song of 2020, naming it the best ballad in Grande's entire catalog. She praised Grande's "transcendent" vocals, writing that the song "boasts some of her most intimate, impressive lyrics to date". She also commended the song for being "sentimental and expressive without feeling pretentious". In Billboard's staff list of the 100 best songs of 2020, "POV" was positioned at 52, with Rania Aniftos commenting that the song "smash[es] the walls [Grande] built up throughout Sweetener and Thank U, Next" and "reveal[s] her most beautifully defenseless side yet". NPR ranked "POV" as the 98th best song of 2020, with Nastia Voynovskaya from KQED stating: "Ariana Grande's 'POV' comes off as a fluttering, ethereal ode to newfound love, but it's really a meditation on how she uses romance as a lens to better get to know herself."

Erin Parker of Glamour selected "POV" as one of the 63 best songs of 2020, writing: "I'm always here for an Ari ballad, and 'POV' is such a gorgeous ending to Positions." Natasha Jokic of BuzzFeed picked "POV" as one of the best songs of 2020. Complimenting Grande's "breathtaking" vocals, she stated: "'POV' gives us a tender insight that's a lot more vulnerable than the rest of Positions might suggest." Karla Rodriguez of Complex ranked "POV" as the 10th best song of 2020. Cahleb Derry of CED Radio named "POV" the sixth best song of 2020, citing a "level of musical and emotional maturity that you cannot fabricate — you simply have to be there to make music like that." Harper's Bazaar named "POV" as one of the best songs of 2020, with Erica Gonzales calling it a "head-over-heels-in-love ballad" and a standout track from Positions. Rachel Epstein of Marie Claire regarded "POV" as one of the best love songs of 2020.

== Commercial performance ==
Following the release of Positions, "POV" debuted at number 40 on the US Billboard Hot 100, becoming the fifth highest charting track from the album that week. "POV" also debuted at number 22 on the Billboard Global 200. As the song sparked an online trend on the video-sharing platform TikTok, it remained stable at number 45 in its second and third week on the Hot 100. Following its launch to US adult contemporary radio, "POV" reached a new peak of number 37 on the Hot 100, in its thirteenth tracking week, on the issue dated June 12, 2021. In its fourteenth tracking week, "POV" declined two spots to number 39, while in its fifteenth tracking week, it rose to a new peak of number 33 on the chart. Following the release of its live music video, "POV" soared to a new peak of number 27 on the Hot 100. It has since charted for a total of 20 non-consecutive weeks.

"POV" entered the top ten of the US Mainstream Top 40 airplay chart at number ten on the issue dated May 15, 2021. It became the third consecutive top ten hit from the parent album Positions and Grande's 19th top ten single. The same week Grande had three songs in the top ten of pop airplay chart, "Positions", "34+35" and "POV" making her the first artist to post three concurrent top ten hits in the survey's history, which started in 1992. Since earning her first top ten hit with "Problem" in June 2014, no other artist has earned as many top ten hits as Grande. The song reached a peak of number three there.

In the United Kingdom, "POV" debuted at number 22, becoming Grande's 29th top 40 entry on the UK Singles Chart. In the following week, it rose to a new peak of 19, becoming Grande's 26th top 20 hit in the UK.

== Music video ==
A music video for "POV" was expected to be released, however it wasn’t released for unknown reasons.

On January 18, 2022, actor George Todd McLachlan, who played in Euphoria and Shameless, posted a TikTok confirming the music video, showing the shooting schedule of the project. The video shoot took place in Miami, Florida.

On May 18, 2023, the music video, directed by Stefan Kohli and produced by Valerie Bush and Julio Mata Jr., leaked in its entirety. The video was then later released exclusively on Kohli’s website.

== Credits and personnel ==
Credits adapted from Tidal and the liner notes of Positions.

Personnel

- Ariana Grande – vocals, background vocals, vocal production, vocal arrangement, audio engineering
- Tommy Brown – production
- Mr. Franks – production
- Oliver "Junior" Frid – production
- Tayla Parx – vocal production
- Peter Lee Johnson – strings
- Billy Hickey – audio engineering, mix engineering
- David Campbell – strings arrangement
- Steve Churchyard – strings audio engineering
- Jeff Fitzpatrick – strings audio engineering assistance
- Serban Ghenea – mixing
- Randy Merrill – mastering
- Gerry Hilera – concert mastering, violin
- Mario de Leon – violin
- Ellen Jung – violin
- Ana Landauer – violin
- Phillip Levy – violin
- Lorand Lokuszta – violin
- Michele Richards – violin
- Neil Samples – violin
- Ashoka Thiagarajan – violin
- David Walther – viola
- Rodney Wirtz – viola
- Paula Hochhalter – cello
- Ross Gadsworth – cello

Recording and management

- Recorded at Champagne Therapy Studios (Los Angeles, California)
- Orchestra recorded at Capitol Recording Studios (Los Angeles, California)
- Mixed at MixStar Studios (Virginia Beach, Virginia)
- Mastered at Sterling Sound (New York, New York)

Notes

- Physical releases of Positions credit Grande for "lyrics and melodies".

== Charts ==
=== Weekly charts ===
Weekly chart performance for "POV"
Chart (2020–2022)	Peak position
Australia (ARIA)	29
Canada Hot 100 (Billboard)	31
Canada CHR/Top 40 (Billboard)	14
Canada Hot AC (Billboard)	35
France (SNEP)	136
Global 200 (Billboard)	22
Greece International (IFPI)	35
Ireland (IRMA)	16
Lithuania (AGATA)	49
Netherlands (Single Top 100)	65
New Zealand (Recorded Music NZ)	19
Portugal (AFP)	51
Puerto Rico Anglo (Monitor Latino)	9
Scottish Singles Sales (Official Charts)	89
Singapore (RIAS)	21
Sweden (Sverigetopplistan)	83
Switzerland (Schweizer Hitparade)	81
UK Singles (Official Charts)	19
US Billboard Hot 100	27
US Adult Pop Airplay (Billboard)	24
US Dance Airplay (Billboard)	23
US Pop Airplay (Billboard)	3
US Rhythmic Airplay (Billboard)	40
US Rolling Stone Top 100	10

=== Year-end charts ===
Year-end chart performance for "POV"
Chart (2021)	Position
US Billboard Hot 100	87
US Mainstream Top 40 (Billboard)	21

== Certifications ==
Certifications for "POV"
Region	Certification	Certified units/sales
Australia (ARIA)	Platinum	70,000^{‡}
Brazil (Pro-Música Brasil)	Diamond	160,000^{‡}
Canada (Music Canada)	2× Platinum	160,000^{‡}
France (SNEP)	Gold	100,000^{‡}
New Zealand (RMNZ)	Platinum	30,000^{‡}
Norway (IFPI Norway)	Gold	30,000^{‡}
Poland (ZPAV)	Gold	25,000^{‡}
Portugal (AFP)	Gold	5,000^{‡}
United Kingdom (BPI)	Gold	400,000^{‡}
United States (RIAA)	2× Platinum	2,000,000^{‡}
^{‡} Sales+streaming figures based on certification alone.

== Release history ==
Release dates and formats for "POV"
Region	Date	Format	Label	Ref.
United States	March 23, 2021	Contemporary hit radio	Republic	
United States	April 19, 2021	Adult contemporary radio; hot adult contemporary radio; modern adult contemporary radio	Republic	
