= 34+35 =

2020 single by Ariana Grande

Single by Ariana Grande

from the album Positions
- B-side: "My Hair"
- Released: November 3, 2020
- Recorded: February–July 2020
- Studio: Champagne Therapy (Los Angeles)
- Genre: Pop; R&B
- Length: 2:53
- Label: Republic
- Composers: Tommy Brown; Steven Franks; Peter Lee Johnson; Courageous Xavier Herrera; Albert Stanaj
- Lyricists: Ariana Grande; Tayla Parx; Victoria Monét; Scott Nicholson
- Producers: Peter Lee Johnson; Tommy Brown

Ariana Grande singles chronology
"Positions" (2020)	"34+35" (2020)	"Oh Santa!" (2020)

Music video
- "34+35" on YouTube

"34+35" (pronounced "Thirty-Four Thirty-Five") is a song by American singer-songwriter Ariana Grande, released on November 3, 2020, by Republic Records as the second official single from her sixth studio album Positions (2020). Written by Grande, Albert Stanaj, Courageous Xavier Herrera, Scott Nicholson, Steven Franks, Tayla Parx, Victoria Monét, and its producers Peter Lee Johnson and Tommy Brown, the song has a title and chorus that both reference the 69 sex position, while the rest of its lyrics feature several sexual puns, double entendres, and sex jokes.

"34+35" debuted at number eight on the US Billboard Hot 100, becoming Grande's 18th top ten single, and later rose to reach a peak of number two for two non-consecutive weeks, becoming her 12th top-five single. It also debuted at number five on the Billboard Global 200, becoming Grande's second top ten single on the chart; it later reached a peak of number two there. Additionally, "34+35" peaked within the top ten in Australia, Canada, Ireland, Malaysia, Singapore and the United Kingdom, becoming Grande's 19th top ten single in the latter.

Its music video, directed by Director X, premiered on November 17, 2020. An official remix of the song, with Doja Cat and Megan Thee Stallion, was released on January 15, 2021. A live performance video of "34+35" was released on July 15, 2021.

== Background and promotion ==
I just think it's ridiculous, so funny and stupid. We heard the strings that sounded so Disney and orchestral, and full and pure. And I was just like, "Yo, what's the dirtiest possible, most opposing lyric that we could write to this?"

— Grande, during an interview on the Zach Sang Show.

"34+35" was first revealed when Grande announced the track list of Positions via social media on October 24, 2020. Grande started working on the song in 2019, and finished it in September 2020 after she decided it was going to be on the album. It was originally intended to be the lead single of the album before being replaced by title track "Positions", after Grande decided that it was more appropriate as it gave a more accurate representation of the album. Given the explicit nature of the song, which has been compared to Grande's past works such as "Side to Side" and "Dangerous Woman", Grande said that she was "very nervous" about the song initially, fearing that it would "distract from the vulnerability and the sweetness that is the rest of the album". She stated that it was sonically "one of [her] favorite things [she and her team have] ever done", adding: "it deserve[d] a home on the album for sure...I think that everything I do has a little bit of humor, and the people know that I'm not really sitting here 'til dawn."

To promote the song, Grande released a "34+35 dad hat" on her official merchandise store, which features "34+35" graphics embroidered on the front of a baseball cap. "34+35" was sent to contemporary hit radio in Australia and the United States on October 30 and November 3, 2020, respectively. It was later sent to hot adult contemporary radio on January 19, 2021. A lyric video was released on YouTube on October 30, 2020.

== Composition ==
"34+35" is an uptempo pop and R&B song with an instrumentation utilizing violins, plucked strings, and elements of trap music. The song is written with a tempo of 110 beats per minute in the key of F major, while Grande's vocals range from a low note of G_{3} to a high note of F_{5.} The song's lyrics include sexual puns, double entendres, and sex jokes, while the song's title (which, as a mathematical expression, evaluates to 69) and chorus reference to the 69 sex position, with the outro's lyrics including "Means I wanna 69 witcha". Other lyrics include explicit sexual references, such as "Can you stay up all night?/Fuck me 'til the daylight”. The song was written about Grande's sex life with her then-boyfriend Dalton Gomez. According to Grande, the line, "Just gimme them babies" was suggested by choreographer Scott Nicholson as a joke to complete the first verse, on the night she started writing the song, but she liked it so much that it ended up in the final version. The earthquake referenced in the third verse ("Got the neighbours yellin' "Earthquake!"/4.5 when I make the bed shake") was based on an actual earthquake of magnitude 4.5 that occurred in Southern California in September 2020. Grande wrote the bridge together with songwriters Tayla Parx and Victoria Monét.

Mary Siroky of Consequence of Sound called the track "overwhelmingly playful" and "no-holds-barred", with Heather Taylor-Singh of Exclaim! writing that it featured an "overt sexiness". Adam White of The Independent called the song's lyrics "dirty-minded" and "cutely tongue-in-cheek", while Brenton Blanchet of Clash regarded "34+35" as "Grande's most sexually explicit track yet". Similarly, Natalie Morin of Refinery29 named the song "Grande's sex magnum opus".

== Critical reception ==
On his ranking of every song on Positions, where "34+35" was positioned at number two, Jason Lipshutz of Billboard praised Grande for being one of the "few artists working today [who] could release an explicit sex track that sounds this luxurious and ornately detailed", describing the song as "unapologetic and dizzyingly fun, with Grande shrugging off the need for euphemism and rightfully confident in her approach". Writing for The Line of Best Fit, Ross Horton identified "34+35" as the best song on and the "mission statement" for the album, writing that "the amount of puns, double entendres and jokes littered throughout is staggering".

Variety's Chris Willman remarked that "34+35" was "a little bit on the schoolgirl-sniggering side" and that the outro's literalization of the song's 69 joke was "unnecessary". Shaad D'Souza of The Fader referred to the song as a "hammy ode to 69-ing" which "makes no attempts at even the most vaguely clever innuendo". Slant Magazine's Alexa Camp considered the song's lyrics "a lot of empty pillow talk and plentiful dog whistles." Emma Madden of Entertainment Weekly criticized the song's lyrics, writing, "Grande sings that she was 'never good' in math class on '34+35,' and it seems she might be equally bad at math-related wordplay."

=== Year-end lists ===
Uproxx ranked "34+35" as the 9th best song of 2020, with Caitlin White commenting that the song is more carefree and funnier than the lead single "Positions", and that it "has all the makings of a late album hit, and will go down in Ari's catalogue as one of her most clever offerings". LaTesha Harris from NPR ranked "34+35" as the 8th best song of 2020. Tidal ranked "34+35" as the 32nd best pop song of 2020. Jessica McKinney of Complex ranked "34+35" as the 42nd best song of 2020. Calling its production "immaculate", she commented that the song is "sexually explicit, seductive, luxurious, and elegant, guided by Grande's sultry vocals".

== Accolades ==
Awards and nominations for "34+35"
Year	Organization	Award	Result	Ref.
2021	GAFFA Awards (Sweden)	International Song of the Year	Nominated	
2021	MTV Video Music Awards	Best Choreography	Nominated	

== Commercial performance ==
=== United States ===
Following the release of Positions, "34+35" debuted at number eight on the US Billboard Hot 100 chart issue dated November 14, 2020, drawing in 21.7 million streams, 5.7 million airplay audience impressions and 3,000 digital downloads sold within its first tracking week. It became Grande's eighteenth top ten single, tying her with Beyoncé for the eighth-most among women in the chart's 62-year history. Since earning her first top-ten hit with "The Way" in April 2013, no other female artist has earned as many Hot 100 top ten hits as Grande. The remix of "34+35" with Doja Cat and Megan Thee Stallion soared to a new peak of number two on the Hot 100; several weeks later, the original version also reached the same position. Helped by the release of the music video of the remix, "34+35" re-peaked at number two on the chart dated February 27, 2021, drawing in 18.1 million streams, 60.2 million airplay audience impressions and 16,000 digital downloads sold within its 16th tracking week. This time Grande was solely credited on the chart. It marked Grande's twelfth top-five hit on the Hot 100, and the second track off of Positions to do so after its title track.

On the US Billboard Mainstream Top 40 airplay chart, "34+35" peaked at number one on the issue dated February 13, 2021, becoming the second consecutive chart topper from the parent album Positions and earning Grande her eighth number one single and 18th overall top ten single. It replaced Grande's own "Positions" which dominated the chart for seven consecutive weeks, making Grande the first artist to succeed herself at number one as the only act credited on both tracks. Joining Mariah Carey, Outkast, Iggy Azalea and Halsey, Grande also became just the fifth artist in Billboard history to replace themselves on the Pop Songs airplay chart. It remained at number one for a second consecutive week. The same week Grande simultaneously occupied the top two of pop airplay chart with "34+35" and "Positions", making Grande the first artist to simultaneously occupy the top two with two solo songs. Joining Mariah Carey, Outkast, Pharrell Williams, Iggy Azalea and Halsey, Grande also became just the sixth artist in Billboard history to simultaneously occupy the entire top two of Pop Songs airplay chart. It remained at number one for three consecutive weeks. It also peaked at number one on the Billboard Rhythmic Top 40 airplay chart on the issue dated March 13, 2021, becoming Grande's third number one hit and 13th overall top ten single on the rhythmic airplay chart.

On October 31, 2025, "34+35" was certified 5× platinum by the Recording Industry Association of America (RIAA) for moving 5 million units in the United States.

=== Other territories ===
Globally, "34+35" debuted at number five on the Billboard Global 200 chart issue dated November 9, 2020, becoming Grande's second top ten hit. With the help of "34+35" and "Positions", the latter of which was at number one, Grande became the first woman, and third artist overall, joining Justin Bieber and BTS, with two top five hits apiece on the Global 200 so far.

In Canada, "34+35" entered the Canadian Hot 100 chart at number eight on the issue dated November 14, 2020, becoming Grande's 18th top ten single in the country. Following the release of the remix featuring Doja Cat and Megan Thee Stallion, "34+35" reached a peak of number five on the issue dated January 30, 2021, becoming the second top five hit from the parent album Positions.

In the United Kingdom, "34+35" debuted at number nine on the UK Singles Chart on the week ending November 12, 2020, becoming Grande's 19th top ten entry in Britain. It rebounded to a new peak of number eight on the week ending January 14, 2021. Following the release of the remix featuring Doja Cat and Megan Thee Stallion, "34+35" reached a peak of number three on the week ending January 28, 2021, becoming Grande's 15th top five hit in the United Kingdom. On October 15, 2021, "34+35" was certified Platinum by the British Phonographic Industry (BPI) for moving 600,000 units in the United Kingdom. In Ireland, "34+35" debuted at number four on the Irish Singles Chart, becoming Grande's 18th top ten single in the country.

"34+35" also achieved success in Oceania; the song debuted at number nine on the ARIA Singles Chart, earning Grande her 17th top ten single in the country. Following the release of the remix featuring Doja Cat and Megan Thee Stallion, "34+35" reached a new peak of number five on the ARIA Singles Chart, becoming the second top five hit from Positions after the title track which debuted and peaked at number one. In New Zealand, "34+35" peaked at number three on the New Zealand Singles Chart chart issue dated January 25, 2021.

== Music video ==
A music video directed by Director X was released on November 17, 2020, on Grande's YouTube channel. The video premiered at 9 am PST. The video starts with Grande in a lab, wearing a lab coat. She can be seen scribbling notes and maneuvering machinery. Grande also studies a robot version of herself and struggles to make the robot come to life. After many attempts, the robot awakens and transforms all of the scientists' clothes into nightgowns reminiscent of fembots as they all start dancing. The video is also interspersed with scenes of Grande and her dancers dancing and posing in a white room with projecting black polka dots. The music video contains references to the 1927 movie Metropolis.

Nylon named "34+35" music video as one of the most memorable music videos of 2020.

== Credits and personnel ==
Credits adapted from Tidal and the liner notes of Positions.

Personnel

- Ariana Grande – vocals, background vocals, vocal production, vocal arrangement, audio engineering
- Tommy Brown – production
- Steven Franks – co-production
- Peter Lee Johnson – production, strings
- Courageous Xavier Herrera – co-production
- Billy Hickey – audio engineering
- Şerban Ghenea – mixing
- Randy Merrill – mastering

Recording

- Recorded at Champagne Therapy Studios (Los Angeles, California)
- Mixed at MixStar Studios (Virginia Beach, Virginia)
- Mastered at Sterling Sound (New York, New York)

Notes

- Physical releases of Positions credit Grande, Nicholson, Monét and Parx for "lyrics and melodies".

== Charts ==
=== Weekly charts ===
Weekly chart performance
Chart (2020–2021)	Peak position
Argentina Anglo (Monitor Latino)	8
Australia (ARIA)	5
Austria (Ö3 Austria Top 40)	40
Belgium (Ultratip Bubbling Under Flanders)	1
Belgium (Ultratip Bubbling Under Wallonia)	8
Bolivia Anglo (Monitor Latino)	8
Brazil (Top 100 Brasil)	94
Canada Hot 100 (Billboard)	5
Canada CHR/Top 40 (Billboard)	4
Canada Hot AC (Billboard)	42
Colombia Anglo (Monitor Latino)	11
Czech Republic Singles Digital (ČNS IFPI)	67
Denmark (Tracklisten)	33
Finland Airplay (Radiosoittolista)	93
France (SNEP)	86
Germany (GfK)	59
Global 200 (Billboard)	2
Greece International (IFPI)	11
Guatemala Anglo (Monitor Latino)	7
Hungary (Single Top 40)	12
Hungary (Stream Top 40)	20
Ireland (IRMA)	4
Italy (FIMI)	82
Japan Hot Overseas (Billboard)	5
Lithuania (AGATA)	16
Malaysia (RIM)	3
Mexico Ingles Airplay (Billboard)	29
Netherlands (Dutch Top 40 Tipparade)	4
Netherlands (Single Top 100)	32
New Zealand (Recorded Music NZ)	3
Norway (VG-lista)	26
Panama Anglo (Monitor Latino)	8
Peru Anglo (Monitor Latino)	6
Portugal (AFP)	13
Paraguay Anglo (Monitor Latino)	4
Puerto Rico Anglo (Monitor Latino)	4
Romania (Airplay 100)	100
Scottish Singles Sales (Official Charts)	74
Singapore (RIAS)	2
Slovakia Singles Digital (ČNS IFPI)	49
South Korea (Gaon)	137
Spain (PROMUSICAE)	78
Sweden (Sverigetopplistan)	34
Switzerland (Schweizer Hitparade)	33
UK Singles (Official Charts)	3
US Billboard Hot 100	2
US Adult Pop Airplay (Billboard)	24
US Dance Airplay (Billboard)	3
US Pop Airplay (Billboard)	1
US Rhythmic Airplay (Billboard)	1
US Rolling Stone Top 100	2
Venezuela Anglo (Monitor Latino)	10

=== Year-end charts ===
Year-end chart performance of "34 35"
Chart (2021)	Position
Australia (ARIA)	53
Canada (Canadian Hot 100)	35
Global 200 (Billboard)	21
New Zealand (Recorded Music NZ)	42
Portugal (AFP)	176
South Korea (Gaon)	200
UK Singles (OCC)	65
US Billboard Hot 100	21
US Dance/Mix Show Airplay (Billboard)	16
US Mainstream Top 40 (Billboard)	7
US Rhythmic (Billboard)	26

== Certifications ==
Certifications
Region	Certification	Certified units/sales
Australia (ARIA)	3× Platinum	210,000^{‡}
Austria (IFPI Austria)	Gold	15,000^{‡}
Brazil (Pro-Música Brasil)	3× Diamond	480,000^{‡}
Canada (Music Canada)	5× Platinum	400,000^{‡}
Denmark (IFPI Danmark)	Gold	45,000^{‡}
France (SNEP)	Platinum	200,000^{‡}
Italy (FIMI)	Gold	35,000^{‡}
New Zealand (RMNZ)	3× Platinum	90,000^{‡}
Norway (IFPI Norway)	Platinum	60,000^{‡}
Poland (ZPAV)	Platinum	50,000^{‡}
Portugal (AFP)	Platinum	10,000^{‡}
Spain (Promusicae)	Gold	30,000^{‡}
United Kingdom (BPI)	Platinum	600,000^{‡}
United States (RIAA)	5× Platinum	5,000,000^{‡}
Streaming
Sweden (GLF)	Gold	4,000,000^{†}
^{‡} Sales+streaming figures based on certification alone.^{†} Streaming-only figures based on certification alone.

== Remix ==
"34+35" (remix)

Single by Ariana Grande featuring Doja Cat and Megan Thee Stallion

from the album Positions (deluxe)
- Released: January 15, 2021
- Recorded: 2020
- Genre: Pop rap
- Length: 3:02
- Label: Republic
- Composers: Courageous Xavier Herrera; Peter Lee Johnson; Steven Franks; Tommy Brown
- Lyricists: Amala Dlamini; Ariana Grande; Megan Pete; Scott Nicholson
- Producers: Peter Lee Johnson; Tommy Brown

Ariana Grande singles chronology
"Oh Santa!" (2020)	"34+35" (remix) (2021)	"POV" (2021)

Doja Cat singles chronology
"Best Friend" (2021)	"34+35" (remix) (2021)	"Streets" (2021)

Megan Thee Stallion singles chronology
"Body" (2020)	"34+35" (remix) (2021)	"Cry Baby" (2021)

Music video
- "34+35" (remix) on YouTube

=== Background and release ===
Doja Cat originally had a verse in the original, but it was later scrapped in favor of "Motive". A short snippet of the scrapped version was leaked and surfaced shortly after the album was released. On November 7, 2020, Doja Cat performed her verse during a live stream on Instagram.

Doja Cat first hinted at a collaboration between her, Grande, and Stallion on January 5, 2021. Eight days later, Grande teased a remix of "34+35" through a social media post of a short video of TV displaying the cover art with two then-unknown artists besides her. The next day, she revealed that the remix would feature rappers Doja Cat and Megan Thee Stallion. Grande also revealed the full cover art, featuring artists dressed as replicas of the fembots in the original "34+35" music video. The remix was officially released on January 15, 2021, alongside an accompanying lyric video that was based on the cover art. As the original version of the song was serviced to pop and hot AC radio stations, the remix was serviced to rhythmic radio on January 19, 2021. On February 12, alongside the music video premiere, a CD of "34+35" (remix) was released. That version of the song was announced to be included in the deluxe edition of Positions, which appeared a week later.

=== Composition and reception ===
The remix of "34+35" features a "sparkly" pop sound and sees Doja Cat and Megan Thee Stallion perform the second and third verses, respectively. Doja Cat's verse includes the notable line "I want that 69 without Tekashi", a reference to Tekashi69. In Megan's verse, she mentions streaming media apps Netflix and Hulu, DIY videos created on the video-sharing app YouTube, and coffeehouse chain Starbucks.

Bianca Betancourt of Harper's Bazaar wrote that the trio "does not disappoint" and that Doja Cat and Megan Thee Stallion "effortlessly float over their respective verses". Insider's Callie Ahlgrim dubbed the remix version as "cheeky".

=== Music video ===
On February 1, 2021, Grande teased a music video with two pictures posted to her social media. On February 5, Grande, Doja Cat and Megan all posted the same picture of them in lingerie to social media, hinting at a possible video. On February 9, Grande confirmed the music video and announced that it was scheduled for release on February 12, 2021. It was directed by Stefan Kohli.

The music video begins with Grande at a swimming pool reclining on a lawn chair reading a magazine while swans float by. The camera zooms out to reveal Doja Cat and Megan on two other lawn chairs. All acts later drink champagne. After Doja Cat's verse, Grande orders room service through an intercom. During her verse, Megan is twerking in a bathtub, and all the artists play around with a camcorder in bed. Grande is wearing Victoria's Secret Lace Plunge Teddy lingerie throughout most of the video.

Steffanie Wang of Nylon summarised that in the video all acts are "serving nothing but looks and aspirational lifestyle goals." Billboard's Katie Atkinson called the video "perfect girls' day video."

=== Commercial performance ===
The remix of "34+35" peaked at number two on the US Billboard Hot 100, lodging over 24.2 million on-demand streams and 8,000 digital downloads. It marked Grande's twelfth top-ten hit, Doja Cat's second top-ten hit after "Say So" (2020), and Megan Thee Stallion's third top-ten hit after "Savage" (2020) and "WAP" (2020) with Cardi B. "34+35" marked the highest-charting song credited to three or more female soloists on the Hot 100 since Christina Aguilera, Mýa, Pink and Lil' Kim's "Lady Marmalade" in 2001. Additionally, the remix also reached a new peak of number two on the Billboard Global 200 chart with 60.7 million streams (up 57%) and 11,000 sold (up 284%) globally. With the original version already one of Grande's three top-ten songs, the remix earned Doja Cat her first top-ten hit and Megan Thee Stallion her second after "WAP". The remix also entered the top ten of the Global 200 Excl. U.S. chart for the first time at number five, becoming Grande's third top-ten hit on the chart.

=== Credits and personnel ===
- Ariana Grande – lead vocals, background vocals, engineering, vocal arrangement, vocal production
- Doja Cat – vocals
- Megan Thee Stallion – vocals
- Mr. Franks – co-production
- Tommy Brown –production
- Peter Lee Johnson – production, co-production, strings
- Courageous Xavier Herrera – co-production
- Billy Hickey – engineering
- Shawn "Source" Jarrett – engineering
- Şerban Ghenea – mix engineering
- Mike Dean – mix engineering
- Randy Merrill – master engineering

=== Charts ===
Chart performance
Chart (2021)	Peak position
Colombia (National-Report)	97
Croatia Airplay (HRT)	82
Global 200 (Billboard)	2
Greece (IFPI)	68
Japan Hot Overseas (Billboard Japan)	3
Lithuania (AGATA)	30
New Zealand Hot Singles (RMNZ)	2
US Billboard Hot 100	2
US Rolling Stone Top 100	2

=== Certifications ===
Certifications
Region	Certification	Certified units/sales
Mexico (AMPROFON)	Platinum+Gold	210,000^{‡}
^{‡} Sales+streaming figures based on certification alone.

== Release history ==
Release dates and formats
Region	Date	Format(s)	Version	Label	Ref.
United States	November 3, 2020	Contemporary hit radio	Original	Republic	
United States	November 17, 2020	Rhythmic contemporary radio	Original	Republic	
Various	January 15, 2021	Digital download; streaming	Remix	Republic	
United States	January 18, 2021	AC radio; hot AC radio; modern AC radio	Original	Republic	
United States	January 19, 2021	Rhythmic contemporary radio	Remix	Republic	
Various	February 12, 2021	CD	Remix	Republic	
Various	January 9, 2026	7-inch vinyl	Original	Republic	

== See also ==
- List of Billboard Hot 100 top-ten singles in 2020
- List of Billboard Hot 100 top-ten singles in 2021
