= My Hair =

- Official live performance artwork

Song by Ariana Grande

from the album Positions
- A-side: "34+35"
- Released: October 30, 2020
- Recorded: 2018–2020
- Studio: Champagne Therapy (Los Angeles); Jungle City (New York City)
- Genre: R&B; neo soul
- Length: 2:38
- Label: Republic
- Composers: Grande; Brown; Monét; Parx; Scott Storch; Anthony M. Jones; Charles "Scootie" Anderson
- Lyricists: Ariana Grande; Victoria Monét; Tayla Parx
- Producers: Brown; Storch; Jones^{[a]}; Scootie^{[a]}

Audio video
- "My Hair" on YouTube

"My Hair" is a song by American singer-songwriter Ariana Grande from her sixth studio album Positions (2020). The song was written by Grande, Victoria Monét, and Tayla Parx, with production by Tommy Brown and Scott Storch, and additional production by Anthony M. Jones and Charles "Scootie" Anderson. It was released by Republic Records on October 30, 2020, as the eighth track on the former's sixth studio album Positions. It is a mid-tempo R&B and neo soul song about Grande becoming intimate with her lover by allowing them to see a different side of her by touching her hair. A live performance music video of "My Hair" was released on July 14, 2021.

== Music and lyrics ==
[Hair] definitely is [intimate and personal], especially when your hair kind of is something that you use to differentiate, you know what I mean? My real hair, which is the humungous, curly, curly poof, is kind of, I don’t know… so few people get to see it and it's cute, and it reminds me of me as a kid…it's who I am privately. I think that’s kind of what I envisioned that song being about, is because it's like such an intimate thing to be just like curly shower head. The hair for me is such a guard, character facade type thing, and it has had its own evolution, but it has always been this kind of costume piece.

— Ariana Grande on "My Hair"

"My Hair" is two minutes and 38 seconds. Musically, the song is described as a "warm, retro" R&B and neo soul track blending elements of jazz in its instrumentation and chord progression. Throughout the song, there are lyrics referencing the idiom of letting down her hair, in this case, her ponytail, something Grande is known for. Grande is essentially allowing her lover to run their hands through her hair as a way of becoming vulnerable and intimate with them. In its instrumentation, the song utilizes trumpets, steel drums, and guitars. After the song's bridge, the chorus is sung completely in a whistle tone.

== Critical reception ==
Upon release of Positions, the song received positive reviews from music critics. Maura Johnston, a writer for Time, called the song a "standout track", describing it as a "reinvention of old-school soul".

Jason Lipshutz of Billboard ranked the song at number five in their ranking of tracks from Positions. In the ranking, he praised the song's “looser, breezy, tension-releasing” sound that contrasted the rest of the album. In a ranking of songs in Grande's discography by Billboard, the song was placed at number 23. for combining elements of neo soul with jazz music, as well as showcasing Grande's vocal capabilities. Anna Colletto, a writer at The Maneater, called the song a "cute, flirty ballad" and also claiming that her mastery in whistle tones "defines her as an artist". Writers at the Business Insider had mixed reviews, with one writer applauding Grande for leaning into jazzy and theatrical sounds, while another called it "enjoyable, but not memorable."

== Credits ==
Recording

- Mixed at Mixstar Studios (Virginia Beach)
- Mastered at Sterling Sound (New York City)

Personnel

- Ariana Grande – vocals, lyrics, composition, engineering, vocal production, vocal arrangement
- Victoria Monét – lyrics, composition, engineering, vocal production, vocal arrangement
- Tayla Parx – lyrics, composition, engineering, vocal production, vocal arrangement
- Scott Storch – composition, production, vocal arrangement
- Tommy Brown – composition, production, vocal arrangement
- Anthony M. Jones – composition, co-production
- Charles Anderson – composition, co-production
- Billy Hickey – engineering
- Brendan Morawski – engineering
- Sean Klein – engineering assistance
- Andrew Keller – engineering assistance
- Randy Merrill – mastering
- Serban Ghenea – mixing
- Dammo Farmer – drums
- Peter Lee Johnson – strings

== Charts ==
Chart performance for "My Hair"
Chart (2020)	Peak position
Canada Hot 100 (Billboard)	52
Global 200 (Billboard)	44
Greece International (IFPI)	100
Portugal (AFP)	81
UK Audio Streaming (OCC)	58
US Billboard Hot 100	65
US Rolling Stone Top 100	28
