= Anthony M. Jones =

American producer, songwriter (active 2007– )

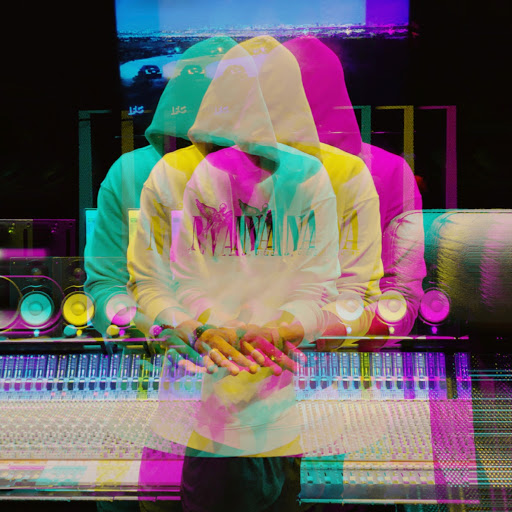
- At Circle House Studios Miami, FL (2019)

Background information
- Also known as: Tone
- Origin: Pittsburgh, Pennsylvania, U.S.
- Genres: Pop, R&B, hip hop, rock
- Occupations: Record producer, Songwriter
- Instruments: Keyboard, drum machine, sampler
- Years active: 2007–present
- Website: anthonymjones.com

Anthony M. Jones, also known as Tone, is an Grammy nominated American record producer, songwriter, and multi-instrumentalist. Artists he has worked for include Ariana Grande, Justin Bieber, Sabrina Carpenter, Post Malone, John Legend, Fifth Harmony, Juice Wrld, Andy Grammer, Mary J. Blige, and Keri Hilson.

Some of his notable productions include Justin Bieber's "Holy", Juice Wrld's "Make Believe", and Ariana Grande's "My Hair" and "Boyfriend", the latter of which was nominated for Best Pop Duo/Group Performance at the 2019 Grammy Awards. He was credited on Neverest's 2011 single "About Us", which won a SOCAN No. 1 Song Award. Other notable singles Jones has produced include "Last Time" by George Nozuka, and "All Said And Done" by Chevy Woods.

Tone is currently working on the new animated series “Disney Jr.’s Ariel,” helping to create one-to-two songs per episode.

== Production discography ==
=== Contributions to Full Lengths and Compilations ===
Year	Artist	Album	Track(s)	Label
2024	Taeyeon	Letter To Myself	"Strangers"	SM Entertainment
2023	Josh Levi	DISC TWO (SCRATCHED UP)	"EGO”	Raedio/Atlantic
2023	Josh Levi	DISC TWO (SCRATCHED UP)	"BIRTHDAY DANCE”	Raedio/Atlantic
2023	Andy Grammer	TBA	"These Tears”	S-Curve
2022	John Legend	LEGEND	"Splash"	Republic Records
2022	John Legend	LEGEND	"One Last Dance"	Republic Records
2022	Lindsey Lomis	Daydreaming	"call me when u get home"	Altadena/Warner Records
2022	Lindsey Lomis	Daydreaming	"die with my friends"	Altadena/Warner Records
2022	Josh Levi	DISC TWO	"All Over Again”	Raedio/Atlantic
2022	Lolo Zouai	PLAYGIRL	"Open the Door”	RCA
2020	Ariana Grande	Positions	"My Hair”	Republic Records
2020	Justin Bieber feat. Chance the Rapper	Justice	"Holy”	Def Jam Records
2020	Carlie Hanson	DestroyDestroyDestroyDestroy	"Good Enough”	Warner Records
2020	Monsta X	All About Luv	"You Can’t Hold My Heart”	Epic
2019	Ariana Grande feat. Social House	Everything Changed...	"Boyfriend”	Republic Records
2019	24kGoldn	Dropped Outta College	"Been Here Before”	RECORDS
2019	Juice Wrld	Death Race For Love	"Make Believe"	Interscope Records
2017	Fifth Harmony	Fifth Harmony	"Bridges"	Epic
2016	Taylor Gang feat. Wiz Khalifa, Juicy J, Project Pat, Cash Out	TGOD Volume 1	"Freaky Before"	Taylor Gang Records
2015	Chevy Woods feat. Dej Loaf	The 48 Hunnid Project	"All Said And Done"	Taylor Gang Records
2015	Chevy Woods feat Post Malone and Peej	The 48 Hunnid Project	"Getcha Some"	Taylor Gang Records
2015	Chevy Woods feat. Wiz Khalifa	The 48 Hunnid Project	"Lookin Back"	Taylor Gang Records
2015	Case	Heaven's Door	"Heavy Breathing"	Entertainment One
2015	Chevy Woods	SXSW I Love Texas	"Houston"	Taylor Gang Records
2013	No Stress	No Stress	"Crazy"	Sony Portugal
2011	Keshia Chanté	Night & Day	"Miss U"	Universal
2011	Neverest	About Us	"About Us"	VicPark Records/Fontana/Universal
2011	Neverest	About Us	"Everything"	VicPark Records/Fontana/Universal
2011	Neverest	About Us	"The Chase"	VicPark Records/Fontana/Universal
2011	Neverest	About Us	"Hello/Goodbye"	VicPark Records/Fontana/Universal
2010	Mary J. Blige	Stronger With Each Tear	"Stay" (Amazon.com exclusive)	Geffen Records
2009	Kristinia DeBarge	Exposed	"It's Gotta Be Love" (co-prod. w/ Babyface)	Sodapop/Island
2009	Keri Hilson	In a Perfect World...	"Do It" (iTunes bonus track)	Mosley/Zone-4/Interscope
2008	Keith Sweat	Just Me	"Just Wanna Sex You"	Atco Records
2008	Keith Sweat	Just Me	"Never Had A Lover"	Atco Records
2008	Ashanti	The Declaration	"Mother"	Universal Motown
2008	George Nozuka	Believe	"Last Time"	HC Entertainment
2008	George Nozuka	Believe	"Can't Stop Loving You"	HC Entertainment
2007	The Cheetah Girls	In Concert: The Party's Just Begun Tour	"Falling For You (Live)"	Walt Disney Records

=== Non-album singles, other ===
Year	Artist	Song	Notes
2007	The Cheetah Girls feat. Miley Cyrus and Everlife	"Girls Just Wanna Have Fun"	The Party's Just Begun Tour
2008	R. Kelly	"Playas Get Lonely"	
2008	Day 26	"Dizzy"	
2009	JoJo	"Take Me (Around the World)"	
2009	Pleasure P	"Baby It's Ova"	
2009	Pleasure P	"After The Club"	
2010	Tank	"Fatal"	
2010	R. Kelly	"I Know You Gotta Man"	
2010	Usher	"Love Em All (Alt Version)"	
2011	Tank	"Waterfalls"	
2011	Rico Love	"Lovers"	
2020	Sabrina Carpenter	"Honeymoon Fades”	Hollywood Records
2021	RMR feat. Tyla Yaweh	"Vibes”	Warner Records

=== Musical Director ===
Year	Artist	Tour	Notes
2007	The Cheetah Girls	"Party's Just Begun Tour"	

== Awards and nominations ==
Award	Year (Note: Indicates the year of ceremony. Each year is linked to the article about the awards held that year, wherever possible.)	Recipient(s) and nominee(s)	Category	Result	Ref.
Grammy Awards	2022	Justice (as songwriter)	Album of the Year	Nominated	
