= Positions (album) =

- Standard cover (Note: Limited edition DTC copies were shipped with two other alternate artworks.)

Studio album by Ariana Grande
- Released: October 30, 2020
- Studios: Grande's home (Los Angeles); Champagne Therapy (Los Angeles); Windmark (Los Angeles); Capitol (Los Angeles); Jungle City (New York City)
- Genres: R&B; pop
- Length: 41:07
- Label: Republic
- Producers: London on da Track; Mr. Franks; Murda Beatz; Nami; Oliver Frid; Peter Lee Johnson; Scott Storch; Shea Taylor; Shintaro Yasuda; The Rascals; Tommy Brown; Tommy Parker; Travis Sayles; Xavi

Ariana Grande chronology
| K Bye for Now (SWT Live) (2019) | Positions (2020) | Eternal Sunshine (2024) |

Singles from Positions
- 1. "Positions" Released: October 23, 2020; 2. "34+35" Released: November 3, 2020; 3. "POV" Released: March 23, 2021

Singles from Positions (deluxe)
- 1. "34+35 Remix" Released: January 15, 2021

Positions is the sixth studio album by American singer-songwriter Ariana Grande. It was released by Republic Records on October 30, 2020. Grande worked with numerous producers on Positions, including frequent collaborator Tommy Brown, accompanied by longtime co-writers Victoria Monét and Tayla Parx. Inspired by her "emotional healing", Grande desired to emphasize her vocals on the album.

Built around themes of sexual intimacy, attraction, and romantic devotion, Positions expands on the trap-infused R&B and pop sound of its predecessors, Sweetener (2018) and Thank U, Next (2019). Doja Cat, the Weeknd, and Ty Dolla Sign appear as guest features, alongside Megan Thee Stallion on the deluxe edition. Upon release, Positions was met with generally favorable reviews from music critics; Grande's vocal performance was often praised, though the album's lyrics and production style drew criticism. Publications ranked the album on various year-end best albums lists of 2020.

The title track was released as the lead single, which debuted atop the Billboard Hot 100 and marked Grande's fifth number-one single in the United States, making her the first act with five number-one debuts on the chart. The song was her third Hot 100 chart-topper in 2020, following "Stuck with U" and "Rain on Me". All 14 tracks on Positions charted simultaneously on the Hot 100, with the second single, "34+35", arriving at number eight on the chart and peaking at number two, following the release of its remix with Doja Cat and Megan Thee Stallion. In 2021, the album was promoted by a series of performances of its tracks, presented by Vevo, and the release of "POV" to US radio as the third single.

With the debut of Positions atop the Billboard 200, Grande earned her fifth number one album in the United States. It spent two consecutive weeks at number one in the country, was certified platinum by the Recording Industry Association of America, and became the eighth most consumed album of 2021 in the US. Elsewhere, the album reached number-one in Argentina, Canada, Croatia, Ireland, Lithuania, New Zealand, Norway and the United Kingdom. Positions contended for Best Pop Vocal Album at the 64th Annual Grammy Awards (2022); Grande tied Kelly Clarkson for the most nominations for an act in the category, with five each.

== Background ==
On April 19, 2020, it was first reported that Ariana Grande was working on new music. She also declared in May 2020 that she had recorded a song with Doja Cat earlier that year. In the same interview, however, Grande stated that she would not release an album during the COVID-19 pandemic lockdown. On October 14, 2020, Grande announced on social media that her upcoming sixth studio album would be released the same month. Three days later, she posted a slow-motion video in which she types out the word "positions" on a keyboard. That same day, Grande's official website launched two countdowns counting down to October 23, 2020, and October 30, 2020. On October 23, 2020, she confirmed via her Twitter account that the album was coming on October 30 and posted the cover art. The tracklist was revealed the following day. Grande released three slightly different Positions album covers on her social media. Each of them are beauty shots of the singer in black and white with varied posing. The covers were shot by Dave Meyers (who also directed the title track's music video), with creative direction by Stefan Kohli.

== Music and lyrics ==
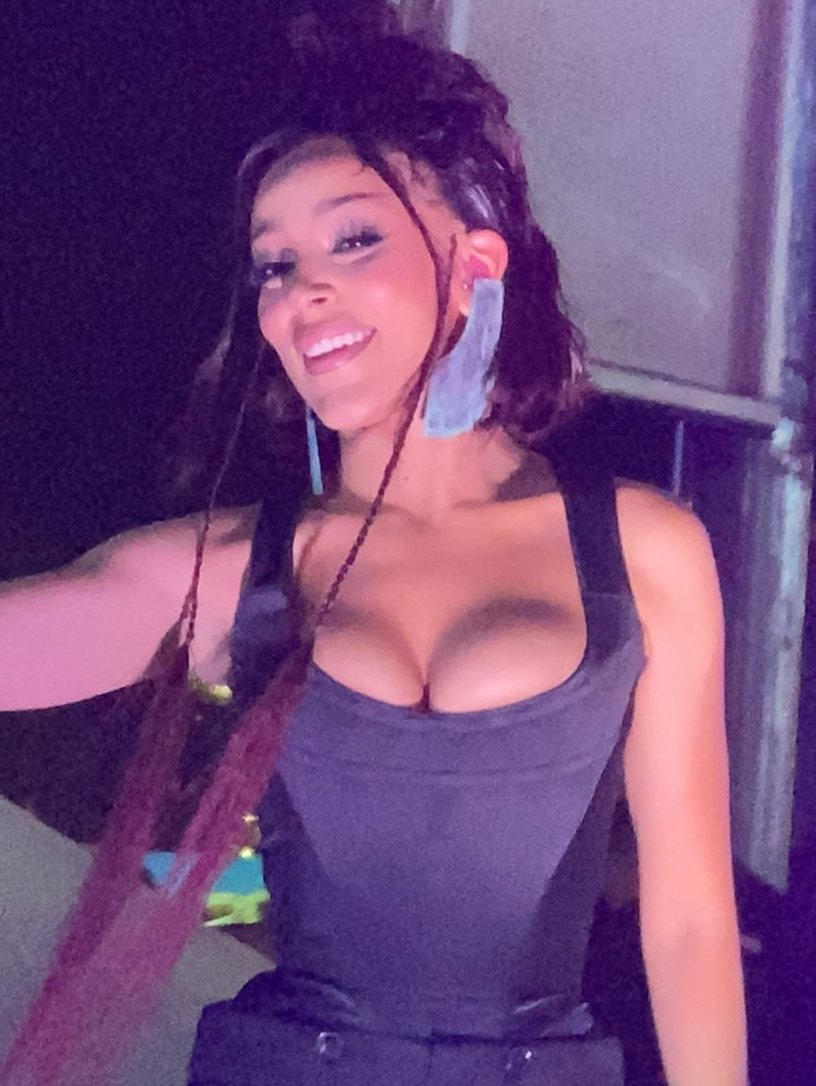
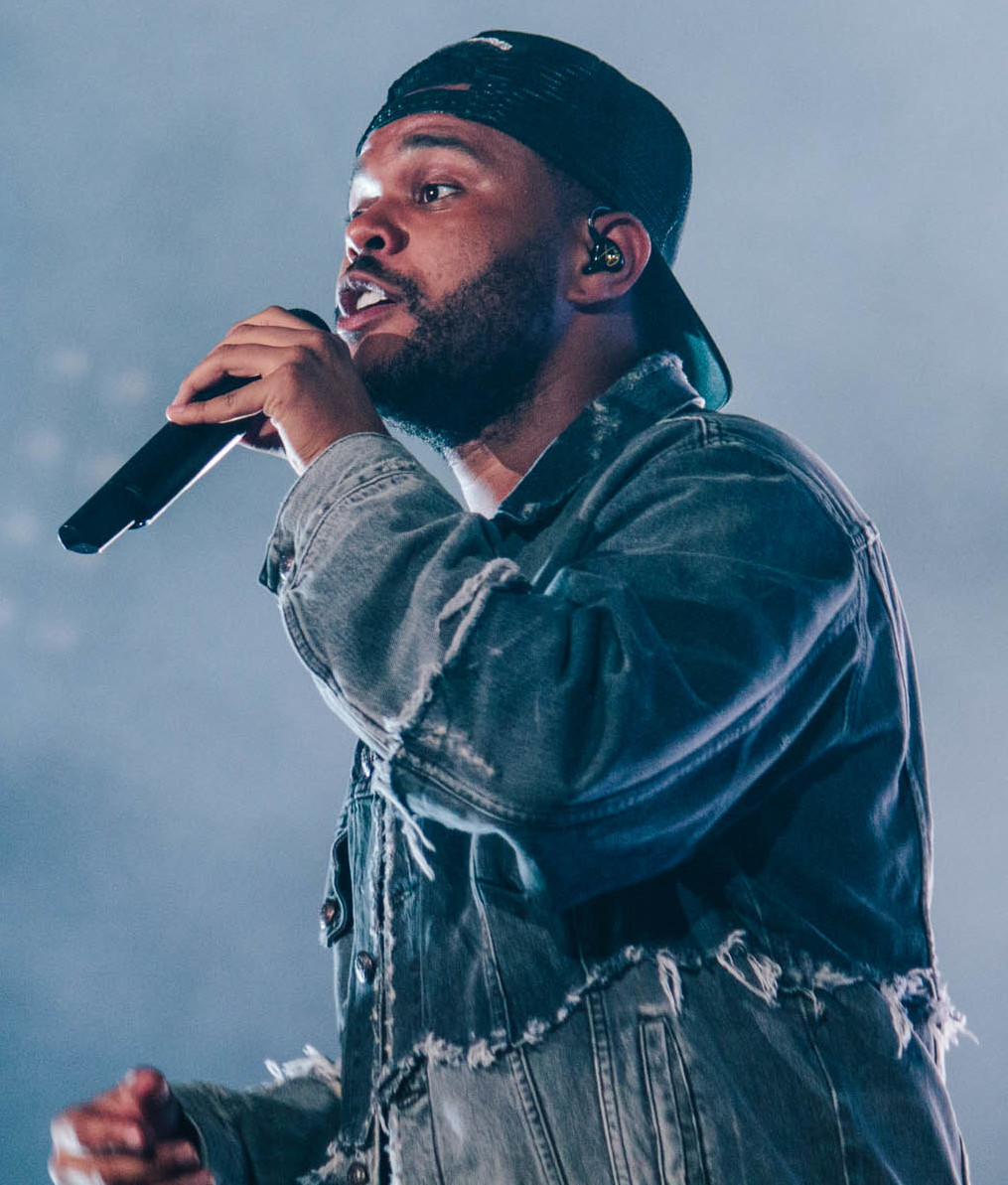
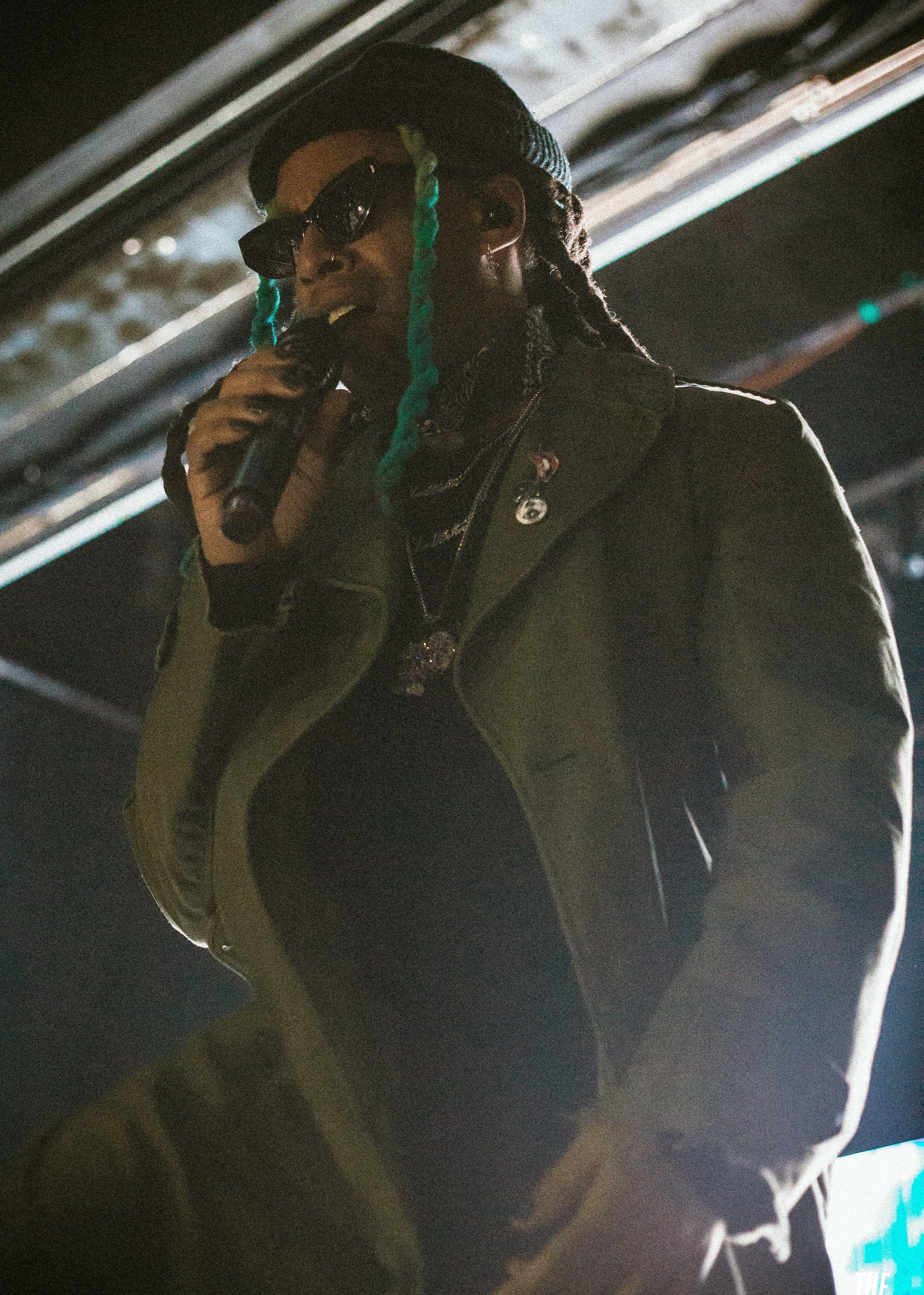
Positions features guest vocals from (left to right) Doja Cat, The Weeknd and Ty Dolla Sign.

Musically, Positions is an R&B and pop record with trap inflections. Its tracks also contain elements of hip hop, neo soul, disco, funk, microhouse, electro house, and orchestral pop. Grande's vocals have been described as evoking mumble rap.

=== Songs ===
Positions opens with "Shut Up", a chamber pop song built around orchestral flourishes and pizzicato strings, establishing the music motif of the album's production. Described as a "jewel box of an orchestral-pop number", Grande addresses people preoccupied with her personal life and encourages them to redirect their time and energy. She explained that the song was intended as an invitation to reject negativity rather than coming off as aggressive. The string arrangement continues into "34+35", an uptempo pop and R&B song that juxtaposes sexually explicit wordplay with layered background vocals, trap-influenced percussion and orchestral instrumentation. Grande said the song began as a joke, with strings that sounded "Disney and orchestral and full and pure", prompting her and her collaborators to contrast the sound with the "dirtiest possible" lyrics they could write. The third track, "Motive", featuring Doja Cat, combines dance-pop, house, and trap elements as Grande questions the intentions and motive of a potential romantic partner. Grande had mentioned the two worked on a track together during an interview in May 2020. The two would collaborate again on the remix of "34+35" alongside American rapper Megan Thee Stallion. On the fourth track, "Just Like Magic", a downtempo R&B and trap song, Grande describes her daily routine, which includes mindful thinking, meditation, professional obligations, and recording music. Lyrically, the song centers heavily on the concept of manifestation as a means to attracting positive outcomes. Blum of Pitchfork referred to it as a sequel to "Successful" from Sweetener (2018), while observing that Grande's reference to writing "love letters to heaven" briefly introduces grief into the otherwise playful song.

The fifth track, "Off the Table", is a slow R&B ballad featuring The Weeknd built around strings and heavy drums. Lyrically, Grande questions whether she is capable of loving again while still healing from the loss of a previous relationship. The Weeknd responds from the perspective of a new partner, assuring her that he is willing to wait despite fearing that he may remain second to someone she has lost. Grande later described the song's creation as "a very intimate moment and writing process between two friends". "Six Thirty" pairs Grande's silky harmonies with an unusual, muted production. Its title refers to the downward position of a clock's hands at 6:30, which Grande uses as a metaphor to ask whether her partner is equally "down" for their relationship. During the bridge, Grande adopts a rap-like delivery while presenting hypothetical situations, such as playing video games, to question the limits of her partner's commitment. The central question reveals Grande's uncertainty over whether her partner is prepared to support her emotionally and whether she is ready to request that support. The uncertainty continues on "Safety Net", a duet with Ty Dolla Sign in which Grande compares falling in love to falling without anything to protect her. Its atmospheric production incorporates murky, sigh-like sounds as Grande debates whether to resist her feelings or surrender to them. The lyrics portray her confronting and negotiating with fear as she experiences emotions she can no longer control. Leon Thomas, one of the song's producers and co-writers, recalled that the song developed spontaneously after he visited Grande with his laptop and Ty Dolla Sign unexpectedly joined the recording session.

"My Hair" is a jazz-infused neo-soul and R&B song incorporating retro guitar, muted trumpet, steel drums, and synthesizers. Initially framed as a sensual double entendre, its lyrics reveal Grande inviting a lover to run their hands through her signature ponytail as an expression of vulnerability and intimacy. The final chorus is performed entirely in her whistle register. Vulture's Rachel Handler described "My Hair" as "a witty, clever little ditty about reassuring an uneasy lover and a classic horny bait and switch" “Nasty” is a lo-fi R&B song incorporating trap and bedroom-pop elements, with Grande’s layered harmonies set against hazy synthesizers. The song opens with whistle tones before Grande openly expresses her desire to move beyond flirtation and act upon her physical attraction. Lyrically, the song has Grande openly and explicitly expressing her desire to move past flirtation and act upon physical attraction. The tenth track, "West Side", is a "simmering" R&B song with hip-hop production and synthesizers. Lyrically, Grande attempts to ease pressure from a developing relationship by rejecting conventional expectations and promising her partner emotional and physical satisfaction. Reviews compared the song’s production to Aaliyah’s “One in a Million” and reported that it contained a sample; however, no sample is credited in the album’s liner notes.

“Love Language” shifts the album's sound into an effervescent, uptempo blend of disco and new jack swing, incorporating string stabs and distorted vocals. Lyrically, Grande uses the concept of speaking and learning a partner’s love language to explore emotional communication, sexual compatibility, and unlearning unhealthy relationship habits. The song concludes with a brief outro taken Grande initially intended to develop into a separate song. She explained that she retained it as an outro after being unable to expand the idea. In It, she expresses commitment to her lover, wanting to make him her home. The title track and lead single, “Positions”, is a midtempo, “slinky” pop-R&B song built around trap percussion, violin, plucked guitar, and intricately layered background vocals. Lyrically, Grande expresses her devotion to her lover and willingness to embrace unfamiliar roles and experiences for the relationship. The title refers both to the different roles Grande is willing to occupy within the relationship and to the song’s sexual innuendos. Grande performed and arranged the layered background vocals heard throughout the track, with behind-the-scenes footage documenting her process of stacking harmonies and ad-libs during the bridge. The thirteenth track, "Obvious”, continues the album’s exploration of new love, with lyrics expressing certainty and commitment in her feelings while hoping that the relationship will not have the same outcomes as previous relationships. The song combines string-heavy production with burbling synthesizers and "classic R&B" melodies. The album closes with “POV”, an R&B ballad that opens with rainfall sounds and features a quiet arrangement of cello and viola. Grande expresses wanting to see herself and all of her imperfections through her partner’s perspective, desiring to hold the same love, trust, and acceptance they extend toward her. The song is characterized as "a plea for self-love that brings the album’s underlying anxiety back into focus."

== Release and promotion ==
On October 27, Grande announced that limited-edition CDs of Positions with two alternate cover artworks are to be released in conjunction with the album, and were made available for preorder on Grande's website.

The album was released on October 30, 2020. The same day, limited quantity of Positions standard edition CDs, autographed by Grande, were issued DTC on the website. On February 19, 2021, a deluxe edition of Positions was released, featuring five additional tracks. The deluxe version was released on CD on March 26, 2021. On April 9, 2021, the vinyl of the standard edition of the album was released, including a glow-in-the-dark variant, available exclusively at Target.

In July 2021, Positions was promoted by a series of live performances of some of its tracks, presented through Vevo. On October 30, 2025, for the album's 5-year anniversary, the performances were released on streaming platforms.

=== Singles ===
The title track, "Positions", accompanied by its music video, was released on October 23, 2020, as the album's lead single. "Positions" debuted atop the US Billboard Hot 100, becoming Grande's fifth number-one single and extending her record of having the most number one debuts of any artist in history. Spending 17 weeks in the top 10 of the Hot 100, it tied "Thank U, Next" as Grande's longest-running top 10 single in the United States. The track also peaked at number one on the US Mainstream Top 40 airplay chart in December 2020, becoming Grande's seventh number one single and 17th top ten single on the chart. It remained at the top position for seven consecutive weeks there, becoming Grande's longest running number one single on the pop airplay chart, surpassing "7 Rings". Internationally, "Positions" was a similar commercial success, topping record charts in 11 countries and reaching the top ten in 30 other countries. In April 2021, "Positions" was certified double platinum by the RIAA, for shipments of over 2 million units in the United States.

"34+35" was released on October 30, 2020, serving as the second single from the album. Its debut at number eight on the Hot 100 marked Grande's 18th career top ten single, tying her with Beyoncé for the eighth-most top ten entries among women. Following the release of its remix, "34+35" reached a peak of number two on the chart dated January 30, 2021, becoming Grande's 12th top five hit in the United States. The track also peaked at number one on the US Mainstream Top 40 airplay chart in February 2021, becoming Grande's eighth number one single and second number one single from Positions. It unseated the title track, which was atop the chart for seven consecutive weeks, making Grande the first artist to replace herself at number one with two solo songs. It remained at the top position for three consecutive weeks. The track also peaked at number one on the U.S. Rhythmic Top 40 airplay chart, becoming Grande's third number one single there. In April 2021, "34+35" was certified double platinum by the RIAA, for moving over 2 million units in the United States.

"POV" was sent to American adult contemporary radio stations on April 19, 2021, as the album's third single. Following the release of the album, "POV" debuted at number 40 on the Hot 100, later peaking at number 27. "POV" entered the top ten of the US Mainstream Top 40 airplay chart at number ten on the issue dated May 15, 2021. It became the third consecutive top ten hit from Positions and Grande's 19th top ten single. The same week, Grande yielded three songs in the top ten of pop airplay chart; the title track, "34+35" and "POV", making her the first artist to post three concurrent top ten hits in the survey's history.

== Critical reception ==
Professional ratings
Aggregate scores
| Source | Rating |
|---|---|
| AnyDecentMusic? | 6.7/10 |
| Metacritic | 72/100 |
Review scores
| Source | Rating |
| AllMusic | 3/5 stars |
| Clash | 8/10 |
| Consequence of Sound | B+ |
| The Daily Telegraph | 3/5 stars |
| The Guardian | 3/5 stars |
| The Independent | 3/5 stars |
| NME | 3/5 stars |
| Pitchfork | 7.4/10 |
| Rolling Stone | 3.5/5 stars |
| Slant Magazine | 3/5 stars |

Positions received generally favorable reviews from music critics, most of whom agreed that Grande "does not break any new ground" with it. At Metacritic, which assigns a normalized rating out of 100 to reviews from mainstream critics, the album has an average score of 72 based on 24 reviews, indicating "generally favorable reviews".

Louise Bruton of The Irish Times labeled Positions a "big orgy of breathless R&B songs" that solidify Grande as one of pop music's leading voices, despite the scarcity of "bangers". Mary Siroky of Consequence of Sound detailed the album as "showy", "wildly theatrical", filled with romance and flirtation, establishing a blend of Dangerous Woman (2016), Sweetener (2018) and Thank U, Next (2019), while dismissing the guest appearances as its weakest songs. Pitchfork's Dani Blum wrote that Grande is "both in love and scared of it" in Positions, as she tries to heal herself in "new giddy romance"; Blum further noticed that the album does not broaden her sound "the way her past few albums have". Clash described the album as "refreshing," but being "removed from her usual major pop moments." Vulture's Craig Jenkins appreciated the "effortless" vocals, and pinpointed how the album is "risqué and unsubtle" in nature, but underlined its safe formula and presence of filler tracks. Hannah Mylrea of NME affirmed that Positions is "jaw-droppingly good fun", however, observed that the washy melodies result in indistinct songs, deficit of Grande's "trademark sparkle".

Chris DeVille of Stereogum lauded the "impeccable" vocals, but downplayed the "least stimulating" production. He dubbed Positions as a solid Grande album, but deemed it a premature "disappointment" in comparison to Sweetener and Thank U, Next. The Telegraph's Kate Solomon described it as "sultry sexjams and thinly veiled euphemisms" with X-rated lyrics, softened by Disneyfied strings, but despite the singer shining new confidence, Positions "doesn't quite hit the spot". Carl Wilson of Slate classified the album as Grande's "most shamelessly sexed-up set" and "back-to-basics-plus album" with relaxed and familiar music, that turns "bedroom calisthenics" and "mundane" romance into "bubbly pop fodder", yet avowed that it feels trivial amidst her other projects. The Independent writer Adam White highlighted the album's push-and-pull dynamic, but felt the singer sticks to her comfort zone, and noted that Positions has "Spotify syndrome"—short songs to aid playlisting.

David Smyth of Evening Standard praised Grande's voice as "a thing of great beauty", but remarked that she "isn't firing as hard as she was when she released her last two albums". Alexis Petridis of The Guardian concluded that the album proceeds at a tiring pace, causing the individual tracks blur into "one long slow-motion shot", without a climax. Naming Positions a misstep in Grande's career, The Fader's Shaad D'Souza denounced its conversational style of vocals, "low-effort" lyrics and trend-chasing production. He thought the songs lacked distinction and punch, dissolving into a "swamp of icy drum hits and aimless melisma". Calling it a product of pandemic fatigue, Alexa Camp of Slant Magazine wrote that Positions leans on "the same midtempo trap-pop" that were on Grande's previous albums, and criticized the lyricism for its "empty" pillow talk and repetitive hooks. Bobby Olivier of Spin found the album "sultry yet forgettable", with several "uninspired" or "unmemorable" tracks.

=== Year-end lists ===
Several publications listed Positions in their rankings of best albums of 2020. Additionally, some of its tracks were also named amongst best songs of 2020: "Positions", "34+35", "POV", "Just like Magic", "Nasty", "My Hair", "Motive", "Love Language", "Six Thirty", and "Off the Table".

Select year-end rankings of Positions
| Publication | List | Rank | Ref. |
|---|---|---|---|
| Billboard | Top 50 Best Albums of 2020 | 11 | |
| Clash | Clash Albums Of The Year 2020 | 49 | |
| Complex | The Best Albums of 2020 | 36 | |
| The Guardian | The 50 Best Albums of 2020 | 40 | |
| The Los Angeles Times | The 10 Best Albums of 2020 | 6 | |
| PopMatters | The 20 Best R&B/Soul Albums of 2020 | 8 | |
| Rolling Stone | The 50 Best Albums of 2020 | 22 | |
| Uproxx | The Best Albums Of 2020 | 20 | |
| Uproxx | The Best Pop Albums of 2020 | 4 | |
| USA Today | The 10 Best Albums of 2020 | 4 | |
| Vogue | The 20 Best Albums of 2020 | 6 | |

=== Awards and nominations ===
Awards won by Positions
| Year | Ceremony | Category | Result | Ref. |
|---|---|---|---|---|
| 2021 | American Music Awards | Favorite Pop/Rock Album | Nominated | |
| 2021 | GAFFA Awards (Denmark) | International Album of the Year | Nominated | |
| 2021 | LOS40 Music Awards | Best International Album | Nominated | |
| 2022 | Grammy Awards | Best Pop Vocal Album | Nominated | |

== Commercial performance ==
=== United States ===
Positions debuted at number-one on the US Billboard 200 chart, with 174,000 album-equivalent units, which included 173.54 million on-demand streams and 42,000 album sales, in its first week. This became Grande's fifth US number one debut and the fourth album by a female artist to reach number one in 2020. At the time of its release, Positions achieved the highest one-week total for an album since bundles and concert ticket offers stopped factoring into chart and sales rankings (October 9, 2020). Positions marked Grande's third number-one album in under two years and three months, which was the fastest accumulation of three number one albums by a woman at that time. It became Grande's fifth chart-topper on the Billboard Top Album Sales chart.

All 14 tracks of Positions charted simultaneously within the top 75 of the US Billboard Hot 100, issue dated November 14, 2020, becoming Grande's second consecutive album to do so, following Thank U, Next (12 songs). Grande's career Hot 100 count expanded to 66 entries, the fourth-most among women. In its second week, the album remained at number one on the chart, with a furthered 83,000 units and 99.5 million on-demand streams. It was her second consecutive album to spend its first two weeks at number one, following Thank U, Next. In its third week, the album slipped to number four on the chart, moving over 75,000 units.

Following the release of the deluxe version, Positions ascended to the second spot of the Billboard 200 on the chart dated March 6, 2021, moving 49,000 units in its seventeenth week. After its vinyl and cassette release, Positions returned to number six on the chart dated April 24, 2021, earning 54,000 units in its twenty-fourth week. The album also peaked atop the Billboard Vinyl Albums Chart in the week ending April 15, 2021, becoming Grande's first chart-topper there. Having sold around 32,000 vinyl LPs that week, it held the former record for the largest vinyl sales week by a female artist since MRC Data began tracking sales in 1991. On April 6, 2021, Positions was certified Platinum by the Recording Industry Association of America (RIAA) for moving a million units in the US.

As of the July 2021 MRC Data report, Positions was the tenth most consumed album of 2021 thus far, having earned 707,000 album-equivalent units in the year's first six months. The sum consisted of 108,000 album sales, 133,000 song sales, 766.2 million on-demand audio streams, and 74 million on-demand video streams. Overall, Positions landed at number eight on the Billboard 200 year-end chart for 2021, while being the third-biggest album amongst female artists, behind Olivia Rodrigo's Sour and Taylor Swift's Evermore. Additionally, three Positions songs landed on the Hot 100 year-end chart of the same year, with "Positions" at number 14, "34+35" at number 21 and "POV" at number 87.

=== Other territories ===
In the United Kingdom, Positions debuted at number one on the UK Albums Chart, becoming her fourth number one album. For the second time, Grande achieved a chart double with the title track at number one as well. Grande achieved this in 2019, when her album Thank U, Next and single "Break Up with Your Girlfriend, I'm Bored" topped the album and singles chart simultaneously. She is the fourth artist, and first female artist, to achieve a chart double in 2020, following Drake, Eminem, and Stormzy, and the second female to achieve this feat twice since Rihanna in 2011. In April 2021, Positions also topped the UK's Official Vinyl Albums Chart.

In Canada, Positions debuted at the top spot of Billboard Canadian Albums chart, yielding Grande her fourth Canadian number-one album and third consecutive number-one album. It remained at number one for two consecutive weeks. All 14 tracks of Positions charted on the Canadian Hot 100 simultaneously—Grande's third album to do so, after Sweetener and Thank U, Next. The title track became Grande's fifth Canadian number-one hit and "34+35" debuted at number eight and later peaked at number five, becoming Grande's eighteenth top ten hit in the country. Positions was the 11th biggest album of 2021 on the Billboard Canadian Albums chart (fourth amongst female artists).

In Ireland, Positions debuted atop the Irish Albums Chart, becoming Grande's fourth consecutive number one album in the country. It was the most downloaded and most streamed album of the week. Joining Madonna, Beyoncé and Taylor Swift, Grande became the fourth female soloist to claim at least four number-one albums on the Irish Albums Chart. The title track became Grande's seventh chart-topper on the Irish Singles Chart and spent three consecutive weeks at number one in the country, while "34+35" peaked at number four.

Aided by Positions, Grande placed at number eight on the list of best-selling artists of the world in 2020 by International Federation of the Phonographic Industry, ranking third amongst women.

== Track listing ==
Standard edition
| No. | Title | Lyrics | Music | Producer(s) | Length |
|---|---|---|---|---|---|
| 1. | "Shut Up" | Ariana Grande; Tayla Parx | Grande; Tommy Brown; Michael Foster; Steven Franks; Peter Lee Johnson; Travis Sayles | Brown; Mr. Franks^{[b]}; Sayles^{[b]}; Johnson^{[c]} | 2:37 |
| 2. | "34+35" | Grande; Scott Nicholson; Parx; Victoria Monét | Grande; Brown; Franks; Johnson; Xavier Herrera; Albert Stanaj^{[c]} | Brown; Franks^{[a]}; Xavi^{[a]}; Johnson^{[c]} | 2:53 |
| 3. | "Motive" (with Doja Cat) | Grande; Doja Cat; Monét; Nija Charles | Grande; Brown; Franks; James McIntyre; Shane Lindstrom | Brown; Murda Beatz; Franks^{[a]}; Joseph L'Étranger^{[a]} | 2:47 |
| 4. | "Just like Magic" | Grande; Priscilla Renea | Grande; Brown; Franks; Shea Taylor | Brown; Franks; Taylor | 2:29 |
| 5. | "Off the Table" (with the Weeknd) | Grande; Abel Tesfaye | Grande; Brown; Franks; Sayles; Shintaro Yasuda | Brown; Shintaro; Franks^{[a]}; Sayles^{[a]} | 3:59 |
| 6. | "Six Thirty" | Grande; Renea | Grande; Brown; Franks; Taylor; Dylan Teixeira | Brown; Franks; Taylor^{[a]}; Nami^{[a]} | 3:04 |
| 7. | "Safety Net" (featuring Ty Dolla Sign) | Grande; Tyrone Griffin, Jr. | Grande; Brown; Khristopher Riddick-Tynes; Leon Thomas III; Silas Doss | Brown; The Rascals; Keys Open Doors^{[b]} | 3:28 |
| 8. | "My Hair" | Grande; Monét; Parx | Grande; Scott Storch; Anthony M. Jones; Charles Anderson | Brown; Storch; Jones^{[a]}; Scootie^{[a]} | 2:38 |
| 9. | "Nasty" | Grande; Monét | Grande; Brown; Sayles; Thomas; Teixeira; Riddick-Tynes | Brown; The Rascals; Sayles; Nami | 3:20 |
| 10. | "West Side" | Grande; Monét | Grande; Brown; Herrera; Ammar Junedi | Brown; Xavi; Junedi^{[b]} | 2:12 |
| 11. | "Love Language" | Grande; Monét; Parx; Kam Parker | Grande; Brown; Sayles; Tommy Parker | Brown; Sayles; T. Parker | 2:59 |
| 12. | "Positions" | Grande; Angelina Barrett | Grande; Brown; Franks; Charles; London Holmes; James Jarvis; Brian Vincent Bates^{[c]} | Brown; Franks; London on da Track | 2:52 |
| 13. | "Obvious" | Grande; Charles | Grande; Brown; Franks; Charles; Sayles; Johnson; Ryan Tedder; Josh Conerly^{[c]} | Brown; Franks; Sayles; Conerly^{[c]} | 2:28 |
| 14. | "POV" | Grande; Parx | Grande; Brown; Franks; Parx; Oliver Frid | Brown; Franks; Frid | 3:21 |
| Total length: | | | | | 41:07 |

Deluxe edition
| No. | Title | Lyrics | Music | Producer(s) | Length |
|---|---|---|---|---|---|
| 15. | "Someone like U" (interlude) | Grande | Grande; Brown; Sayles; Marqueze Parker; Sam Wishkoski; Andrew Wansel | Brown; Pop Wansel; Sam Wish; Marqueze Parker^{[a]}; Sayles^{[a]} | 1:16 |
| 16. | "Test Drive" | Grande; Monét; Parx | Brown; Franks; Parx; Monét; Lindstrom; Zachary Foster | Brown; Franks; Murda Beatz; Zachary Foster | 2:02 |
| 17. | "34+35" (remix; featuring Doja Cat and Megan Thee Stallion) | Grande; Doja Cat; Megan Pete; Nicholson | Grande; Brown; Franks; Johnson; Herrera | Brown; Franks^{[a]}; Xavi^{[a]}; Johnson | 3:03 |
| 18. | "Worst Behavior" | Grande; Parx | Grande; Brown; Franks; T. Parker | Brown; Franks; T. Parker | 2:04 |
| 19. | "Main Thing" | Grande | Grande; Brown; Franks; Sayles; Herrera; Conerly; Yonatan Watts | Brown; Franks; Xavi; Sayles^{[a]}; Conerly^{[a]}; Yonatan Watts^{[a]} | 2:09 |
| Total length: | | | | | 51:41 |

=== Notes ===
- ^{^[a]} signifies a co-producer
- ^{^[b]} signifies an additional producer
- ^{^[c]} these contributors are only credited on digital releases of the album
- Physical releases of Positions credit Doja Cat and the Weeknd as featured artists instead of co-lead artists on "Motive" and "Off the Table", respectively.

== Personnel ==
=== Musicians ===
- Ariana Grande – songwriting, lead and backing vocals (all tracks)
- Doja Cat – lead vocals (track 3) and featured vocals (track 17)
- The Weeknd – lead vocals and backing vocals (track 5)
- Ty Dolla Sign – featured vocals and backing vocals (track 7)
- Megan Thee Stallion – featured vocals (track 17)
- Peter Lee Johnson – strings (tracks 1, 2, 6, 8, 14, and 17)
- Madison Calle – harp (track 1)
- Gerry Hilera – concertmaster (tracks 5, 6, and 11)
- Paula Hochhalter – cello (tracks 5, 6, and 11)
- Ross Gadsworth – cello (tracks 5, 6, 11, and 14)
- David Walther – viola (tracks 5, 6, 11, and 14)
- Rodney Wirtz – viola (tracks 5, 6, 11, and 14)
- Ana Landauer – violin (tracks 5, 6, 11, and 14)
- Ashoka Thiaragarajan – violin (tracks 5, 6, 11, and 14)
- Ellen Jung – violin (tracks 5, 6, 11, and 14)
- Gerry Hilera – violin (tracks 5, 6, 11, and 14)
- Lorand Lokuszta – violin (tracks 5, 6, 11, and 14)
- Mario De Leon – violin (tracks 5, 6, 11, and 14)
- Michele Richards – violin (tracks 5, 6, 11, and 14)
- Neil Samples – violin (tracks 5, 6, 11, and 14)
- Phillip Levy – violin (tracks 5, 6, 11, and 14)
- David Campbell – string arrangements (tracks 5, 6, 11, and 14)
- Dammo Farmer – bass (track 8)
- Tarron Crayton – bass (track 11)
- James Jarvis – guitar (track 12)
- Murda Beatz – drums (track 16)
- Zachary Foster – programming (track 16)

=== Production ===
- Tommy Brown – production, executive production
- Mr. Franks – production (tracks 1, 2, 4, 6, 12–14, 16 and 18–19), co-production (tracks 3, 5, and 17)
- Peter Lee Johnson – production (tracks 1, 2, and 17)
- Travis Sayles – production (tracks 1, 9, 11, and 13), co-production (tracks 5, 15 and 19)
- Xavi – production (tracks 10 and 19), co-production (track 2 and 17)
- Murda Beatz – production (tracks 3 and 16)
- Shea Taylor – production (track 4), co-production (track 6)
- Shintaro – production (track 5)
- Nami – production (track 9), co-production (track 6)
- Keys Open Doors – production (track 7)
- The Rascals – production (tracks 7 and 9)
- Scott Storch – production (track 8)
- Tommy Parker – production (tracks 11 and 18)
- London on da Track – production (track 12)
- Josh Conerly – production (track 13), co-production (track 19)
- Oliver "Junior" Frid – production (track 14)
- Pop Wansel – production (track 15)
- Sam Wish – production (track 15)
- Zachary Foster – production (track 16)
- Ariana Grande – executive production, vocal production (all tracks), vocal arrangement (tracks 1–17)
- Tayla Parx – vocal production (track 14)
- Joseph L'Étranger – co-production (track 3)
- Anthony M. Jones – co-production (track 8)
- Charles Anderson – co-production (track 8)
- Ammar Junedi – co-production (track 10)
- Marqueze Parker – co-production (track 15)
- Yonatan Watts – co-production (track 19)

=== Technical ===
- Randy Merrill – mastering
- Şerban Ghenea – mixing
- Mike Dean – mixing (track 17)
- Ariana Grande – engineering (tracks 1–8 and 10–19)
- Billy Hickey – engineering (tracks 1–8 and 10–19)
- Brendan Morawski – engineering (track 8)
- Sam Ricci – engineering (track 9)
- Shawn "Source" Jarrett – engineering (track 17)
- Brandon Wood – assistant recording engineering (tracks 4 and 6)
- Andrew Keller – assistant recording engineering (track 8)
- Sean Klein – assistant recording engineering (track 8)

== Charts ==
=== Weekly charts ===
Weekly chart performance
| Chart (2020–2024) | Peak position |
|---|---|
| Argentine Albums (CAPIF) | 1 |
| Australian Albums (ARIA) | 2 |
| Austrian Albums (Ö3 Austria) | 5 |
| Belgian Albums (Ultratop Flanders) | 3 |
| Belgian Albums (Ultratop Wallonia) | 5 |
| Canadian Albums (Billboard) | 1 |
| Croatian International Albums (HDU) | 1 |
| Czech Albums (ČNS IFPI) | 5 |
| Danish Albums (Hitlisten) | 2 |
| Dutch Albums (Album Top 100) | 2 |
| Finnish Albums (Suomen virallinen lista) | 4 |
| French Albums (SNEP) | 8 |
| German Albums (Offizielle Top 100) | 7 |
| Greek Albums (IFPI) | 3 |
| Hungarian Albums (MAHASZ) | 29 |
| Icelandic Albums (Tónlistinn) | 3 |
| Irish Albums (Official Charts) | 1 |
| Italian Albums (FIMI) | 8 |
| Japan Hot Albums (Billboard Japan) | 15 |
| Japanese Albums (Oricon) | 21 |
| Lithuanian Albums (AGATA) | 1 |
| New Zealand Albums (RMNZ) | 1 |
| Norwegian Albums (VG-lista) | 1 |
| Polish Albums (ZPAV) | 2 |
| Portuguese Albums (AFP) | 3 |
| Scottish Albums (Official Charts) | 3 |
| Slovak Albums (ČNS IFPI) | 3 |
| South Korean Albums (Gaon) | 56 |
| Spanish Albums (Promusicae) | 5 |
| Swedish Albums (Sverigetopplistan) | 3 |
| Swiss Albums (Schweizer Hitparade) | 4 |
| Swiss Albums (Romandie) | 11 |
| Taiwanese Albums (Five Music) | 1 |
| UK Albums (Official Charts) | 1 |
| US Billboard 200 | 1 |

=== Year-end charts ===
Year-end chart performance
| Chart (2020) | Position |
|---|---|
| Australian Albums (ARIA) | 53 |
| Belgian Albums (Ultratop Flanders) | 124 |
| Belgian Albums (Ultratop Wallonia) | 157 |
| Danish Albums (Hitlisten) | 94 |
| Dutch Albums (Album Top 100) | 41 |
| French Albums (SNEP) | 165 |
| Irish Albums (IRMA) | 39 |
| New Zealand Albums (RMNZ) | 43 |
| Polish Albums (ZPAV) | 95 |
| Spanish Albums (PROMUSICAE) | 63 |
| UK Albums (OCC) | 58 |
| US Top Current Album Sales (Billboard) | 103 |

Year-end chart performance
| Chart (2021) | Position |
|---|---|
| Australian Albums (ARIA) | 28 |
| Belgian Albums (Ultratop Flanders) | 60 |
| Belgian Albums (Ultratop Wallonia) | 90 |
| Canadian Albums (Billboard) | 11 |
| Danish Albums (Hitlisten) | 28 |
| Dutch Albums (Album Top 100) | 34 |
| French Albums (SNEP) | 119 |
| Icelandic Albums (Tónlistinn) | 66 |
| Irish Albums (IRMA) | 42 |
| New Zealand Albums (RMNZ) | 22 |
| Polish Albums (ZPAV) | 46 |
| Spanish Albums (PROMUSICAE) | 49 |
| Swedish Albums (Sverigetopplistan) | 74 |
| UK Albums (OCC) | 50 |
| US Billboard 200 | 8 |

Year-end chart performance
| Chart (2022) | Position |
|---|---|
| Polish Albums (ZPAV) | 48 |
| US Billboard 200 | 101 |

== Certifications ==
Certifications
| Region | Certification | Certified units/sales |
|---|---|---|
| Australia (ARIA) | Platinum | 70,000^{‡} |
| Austria (IFPI Austria) | Gold | 7,500^{‡} |
| Canada (Music Canada) | 2× Platinum | 160,000^{‡} |
| Denmark (IFPI Danmark) | Platinum | 20,000^{‡} |
| France (SNEP) | Platinum | 100,000^{‡} |
| Italy (FIMI) | Gold | 25,000^{‡} |
| Mexico (AMPROFON) | Platinum | 60,000^{‡} |
| New Zealand (RMNZ) | 2× Platinum | 30,000^{‡} |
| Norway (IFPI Norway) | Platinum | 20,000^{‡} |
| Poland (ZPAV) | 3× Platinum | 60,000^{‡} |
| Portugal (AFP) | Gold | 3,500^{‡} |
| Singapore (RIAS) | Gold | 5,000^{*} |
| Spain (Promusicae) | Gold | 20,000^{‡} |
| Switzerland (IFPI Switzerland) | 2× Platinum | 40,000^{‡} |
| United Kingdom (BPI) | Platinum | 300,000^{‡} |
| United States (RIAA) | 2× Platinum | 2,000,000^{‡} |
^{*} Sales figures based on certification alone.^{‡} Sales+streaming figures based on certification alone.

== Release history ==
Release history
| Region | Date | Format(s) | Version | Label | Ref. |
|---|---|---|---|---|---|
| Various | October 30, 2020 | Cassette; CD; digital download; streaming | Standard | Republic | |
| Various | February 19, 2021 | Digital download; streaming | Deluxe | Republic | |
| Various | March 26, 2021 | CD | Deluxe | Republic | |
| Various | April 9, 2021 | LP | Standard | Republic | |
| Japan | April 9, 2021 | CD | Deluxe | Universal Music Japan | |

== See also ==
- Album era
- List of Billboard 200 number-one albums of 2020
- List of UK Albums Chart number ones of the 2020s
- List of number-one albums of 2020 (Canada)
- List of number-one albums of 2020 (Ireland)
- List of number-one albums from the 2020s (New Zealand)
- List of number-one albums in Norway
