= Off the Table =

2020 song by Ariana Grande and the Weeknd

- Official live performance artwork

Song by Ariana Grande and the Weeknd

from the album Positions
- Studio: Grande's house (Los Angeles)
- Genre: R&B
- Length: 3:59
- Label: Republic
- Composers: Tommy Brown; Shintaro; Mr. Franks; Travis Sayles; Grande
- Lyricists: Abel Tesfaye; Ariana Grande
- Producers: Brown; Shintaro

"Off the Table" is a song by the American singer Ariana Grande and the Canadian singer the Weeknd from Grande's sixth studio album, Positions (2020). The two wrote the song while its composers were Grande, Steven Franks, Travis Sayles, and its producers Tommy Brown and Shintaro. It is a slow emotional R&B ballad about rekindling a romantic relationship, which received generally positive reviews from music critics. A live performance music video of "Off the Table" was released on July 21, 2021.

== Background ==
Grande and the Weeknd last collaborated on "Love Me Harder" from Grande's second studio album My Everything (2014). "Off the Table" was announced on October 24, 2020, when Grande posted a picture on social media which contained the full tracklist of Positions.

The song is believed to be related to Grande's ex-boyfriend, the late Mac Miller. Grande and Miller broke up in May 2018, after dating for two and a half years. She subsequently started a new relationship with Pete Davidson. The two got engaged in June 2018, but their relationship ended shortly after Miller died in September 2018 from an overdose. In an interview, Grande revealed that she feared not being able to fall in love again after experiencing certain things and going through traumatic events.

This wasn't written from a "100% this is how I feel", but that fear is something that exists, of course, in your head, when you let the trauma part of your brain take the command seat. That of course exists, and your brain is constantly telling you, "no, you don't deserve this" or "no, this won't happen" or "yes, this person is too good to be true" or "yeah"...you will be frozen in this period of recovery for the rest of your life. There are moments when that traumatic PTSD part of your brain takes the command seat and tells you those things, so I think this was written from that place, and not from a real "I'm in my right mind and I know that I deserve love" place. It was just from the fear place.

— Grande, during an interview on the Zach Sang Show.

She said that it deserves to be expressed and to "come out", adding that "once you write something, it kind of goes away a little bit as well". She felt that "expressing it made it feel so much less legitimate". In the song, the Weeknd played the role of a "perfect dream reaction to a fear like that being expressed", according to Grande. To ensure that the song reflects some sort of reality, she caught up with the Weeknd and "talked about life and everything" before the writing process began, briefing him on the matter and giving him a sum up of her experiences. "He kind of, I think, wrote his verse from a perspective of a person that would be filling certain shoes and what I've heard that has felt nice." She praised the Weeknd for "doing a great phenomenal job writing that", and considered the song a "perfect centerpiece" to the album because it "make[s] every other song on the album make so much more sense".

Grande said that after she received "a pack of beats" from producer Shintaro, she wrote a verse and the chorus before sending it over to the Weeknd to seek his approval. "I was like, 'is this okay?' And he was like, 'yeah, I'm gonna write the second verse.' And I was like, 'okay.'" She described it as "a very intimate moment and writing process between two friends".

== Composition ==
"Off the Table" is a slow emotional R&B ballad about rekindling a romantic relationship. Lyrically, the song describes the process of healing and the difficulty of moving on from a tragic end to a relationship, questioning the existence of love after repeated attempts to search for it had failed.

Grande starts the song by addressing Miller directly: "Will I ever love the same way again? / Will I ever love somebody like the way I did you? / Never thought you'd be so damn hard to replace." Grande struggles to decide whether she is prepared to move on and go into a more serious relationship with her then-boyfriend Dalton Gomez, after losing Miller. In one verse, she sings about her confusion: "Might not be quite yet healed or ready / Should I be goin' too steady? / But I just wanna know is love completely off the table?" The Weeknd, on the other hand, sings from the point of view of a new romantic partner, calming her fears by assuring that he is willing to wait however long it takes for her to get ready for a future relationship. At the end of "Off the Table", Grande samples Miller's song "2009" from his 2018 album Swimming, as she also did in "Ghostin", which is widely assumed to be about her inability to let go of Miller.

Dani Blum of Pitchfork wrote of the composition of the track: "The song blooms over wisps of strings and heavy, heady drums, like an artifact from his Trilogy mixtapes." Alyssa Bailey of Elle felt that it "offers an intimate look into Grande's headspace and healing process". Louise Bruton of The Irish Times wrote that "Grande reveals carefully thought-out vulnerabilities" on "Off the Table".

== Critical reception ==
Brenton Blanchet of Clash noted that the song "thrive[s] off their ability to keep production minimal for those home-run vocal moments". Wongo Okon of Uproxx considered the track "one of the many highlights" on the album. Carolyn Twersky of Seventeen found the song to be "absolutely heartbreaking", praising Grande for her ability to "elicit all the feels with her music", writing that she "could not be more moved" by the ballad. Carl Wilson of Slate views "Off the Table" as one of a few songs that compose "the core of the record". Ross Horton of The Line of Best Fit called the song "magical music", writing that it "evokes prime Mariah in its breathless romance, its hot and heavy sensuality", highlighting the Weeknd's voice for "sounding comfortable and supple, relaxed and controlled in his delivery". Capital's Kathryn Knight opined that the song demonstrates Grande's collaborations "do not disappoint", calling Grande and the Weeknd's vocals "stunning" when put together. Shrusti Goswami of The Daily Targum believed that the collaboration "stood out from the rest of her solo tracks", writing that Grande and the Weeknd "mesh so perfectly" without "sacrific[ing] their music style for the song". Bobby Olivier of Spin applauded the track's "showstopping vocal finish", which allowed "Grande's soaring soprano [to] shine".

Billboard's Jason Lipshutz positioned "Off the Table" at number nine in his ranking of all 14 songs on Positions. He found the song "more meditative" than "Love Me Harder", underscoring the two artists' ability to "pull off a tricky songwriting concept". The Daily Telegraph's Kate Solomon commended the Weeknd's vocals and remarked that "their voices complement each other beautifully". However, she regarded the song as "a bit of a slog", framing it as "an indulgent, Carey-esque showboat for the credits of a forgettable film".

Writing for Consequence of Sound, Mary Siroky felt that "anyone interested in hearing Ariana with The Weeknd should just go ahead and revisit 2014's 'Love Me Harder' instead of spending too much time with 'Off the Table'". Similarly, Hannah Mylrea of NME considered "Love Me Harder" to be vastly superior to "Off the Table", deeming the Weeknd's presence an "unnecessary guest appearance" that adds little to the substance of the song. Alexis Petridis of The Guardian expressed disapproval of the "burst of extemporised singing" at the end of the song, describing the episode as Grande and the Weeknd "apparently attempting [to] deafen each other". Shaad D'Souza of The Fader wrote that the song abandons "the hallmarks of her songwriting circa-Sweetener and Thank U, Next, instead going for something more understated and, as such, underwhelming". He believed Grande opted for a writing style which required skills she never possessed. Adam White of The Independent also called the song a disappointment.

=== Year-end lists ===
Karla Rodriguez and Deborah Cardoso from Complex staff ranked "Off the Table" as the third best song of 2020.

== Credits and personnel ==
Credits adapted from Tidal and the liner notes of Positions.

=== Personnel ===
- Ariana Grande – lead vocals, background vocals, vocal production, vocal arrangement, audio engineering
- The Weeknd – vocals
- Tommy Brown – production
- Shintaro – production
- Mr. Franks – co-production
- Travis Sayles – co-production
- Billy Hickey – audio engineering, mix engineering
- Shin Kamiyama – audio engineering
- David Campbell – strings arrangement
- Steve Churchyard – strings audio engineering
- Jeff Fitzpatrick – strings audio engineering assistance
- Serban Ghenea – mixing
- Randy Merrill – mastering
- Gerry Hilera – concert mastering, violin
- Mario de Leon – violin
- Ellen Jung – violin
- Ana Landauer – violin
- Phillip Levy – violin
- Lorand Lokuszta – violin
- Michele Richards – violin
- Neil Samples – violin
- Ashoka Thiagarajan – violin
- David Walther – viola
- Rodney Wirtz – viola
- Paula Hochhalter – cello
- Ross Gadsworth – cello

=== Recording and management ===
- Recorded at Grande's house (Los Angeles, California)
- Orchestra recorded at Capitol Recording Studios (Los Angeles, California)
- Mixed at MixStar Studios (Virginia Beach, Virginia)
- Mastered at Sterling Sound (New York, New York)
- The Weeknd appears courtesy of XO/Republic Records

=== Notes ===
- Physical releases of Positions credit the Weeknd as a featured artist.
- Physical releases of Positions credit Grande and the Weeknd for "lyrics and melodies".

== Charts ==
Chart performance for "Off the Table"
Chart (2020)	Peak position
Australia (ARIA)	32
Canada Hot 100 (Billboard)	27
France (SNEP)	164
Global 200 (Billboard)	18
Greece International (IFPI)	56
Lithuania (AGATA)	69
Netherlands (Single Top 100)	93
New Zealand Hot Singles (RMNZ)	4
Portugal (AFP)	43
Sweden Heatseeker (Sverigetopplistan)	16
UK Singles Downloads (Official Charts)	87
UK Audio Streaming (Official Charts)	33
US Billboard Hot 100	35
US Rolling Stone Top 100	10

== Certifications ==
Certifications for "Off the Table"
Region	Certification	Certified units/sales
Brazil (Pro-Música Brasil)	Platinum	40,000^{‡}
^{‡} Sales+streaming figures based on certification alone.
