= Motive (song) =

2020 song by Ariana Grande and Doja Cat

Song by Ariana Grande and Doja Cat

from the album Positions
- Released: October 30, 2020
- Studio: Grande's house (Los Angeles)
- Genre: Dance-pop; electro house; microhouse; hip-hop
- Length: 2:47
- Label: Republic
- Songwriters: Ariana Grande; Amala Zandile Dlamini; Victoria Monét; Nija Charles; Tommy Brown; Shane Lindstrom; Steven Franks; Jeremy McIntyre
- Producers: Murda Beatz; Tommy Brown

"Motive" is a song by American singer Ariana Grande and American rapper and singer Doja Cat. The two wrote the song with Victoria Monét, Nija Charles, Jeremy McIntyre, Steven Franks and its producers Murda Beatz and Tommy Brown. It was released by Republic Records on October 30, 2020, as the third track on the former's sixth studio album Positions.

== Background ==
Grande first teased the collaboration with Doja Cat in an interview dated May 13, 2020. She said that they started to work on the song, which was titled "Motivate" at the time, towards the end of 2019. Grande recalled: "I remember when I first wrote it and sent it to her, she was in the shower and she was like, 'Bitch, I love this. I'm in the shower.' And I was like, 'Shower. Okay, there's no rush. I'm not putting out a project anytime soon, whatever. You can call me back.' She was like, 'I'm doing it right now.'" Doja Cat video called her the next morning.

She had a whole verse done, everything was done. [...] She was like, "How many bars can I take? Because this is mad inspiring and I want to just go." And I was like, "Take as many bars as you want. Do it. If you're inspired to say stuff, let's go." And so she just goes off on it, and it's so much fun, and I love it. It's my favorite so far.

— Grande, during an interview with Zane Lowe on Apple Music 1.

Grande praised Doja Cat's personality, calling her "a breath of fresh air". She also expressed her appreciation for her talent and "what she brings to the table musically", adding: "I was able to work with her earlier this year on this song that I want to save for whenever it's time again, to drop."

"Motive" was revealed on October 24, 2020, when Grande posted the track list of Positions on social media. It marks the first collaboration between Grande and Doja Cat, and the first time either artists had worked with Canadian hip hop producer Murda Beatz.

== Composition ==
"Motive" is an upbeat dance-pop, electro house, and microhouse song. Its dance-pop sound has been compared to Grande's 2015 single "One Last Time". It samples a muffled disco bounce, while Doja Cat's verse is layered over Southern California hip hop beats. Lyrically, the song is about figuring out and examining the motive of a possible romantic interest when being approached by them. Alexis Petridis of The Guardian wrote that the song contains "house rhythms and soupy electronics".

== Critical reception ==
"Motive" was positioned at number four on Billboard's Jason Lipshutz's ranking of all 14 songs on Positions. He wrote that the song helped the album to "pick up the tempo", and that "the thump of the production guides the song forward". He called Doja Cat's feature on the song "radio-ready", and expected it to be "a top 40 staple in the near future". Brenton Blanchet of Clash found the "yuh" at the start of Doja Cat's verse "tasteful". Hannah Mylrea of NME wrote that "the bouncing electro-house of 'Motive' is a sweet treat". Kate Solomon of The Daily Telegraph identified the song as "one of the album's highlights", regarding it as "a made-for-radio hit" and calling it "one of the few tracks on the album to raise the tempo from a sleepy post-coital snuggle". David Smyth of the Evening Standard praised Grande's voice, and pointed out "how lightly [her] vocals float" when contrasted against Doja Cat's rap verse. Erica Gonzales of Harper's Bazaar described the song as "catchy as hell", writing: "The track is also perfectly upbeat and apropos for our virtual dance floors (a.k.a. our kitchens and bedrooms)." Alexa Camp of Slant Magazine considered the song "a welcome change of pace", given the scarcity of uptempo tracks on Grande's previous album, Thank U, Next.

Shaad D'Souza of The Fader deemed the track "the album's most dynamic moment", which he believed boasts the most significant tempo change and the strongest hook besides lead single "Positions". However, he felt "Grande jumping on a house-inflected beat" was "cheap", writing that it seemed "out-of-character" for Grande to hop on pop music trends.

Dani Blum of Pitchfork opined that the song might have been "an internet-breaking banger" if it was written in any other year, describing it as "twinkling and hushed". Bobby Olivier of Spin felt the song was a "well-sung throwaway that contribute nothing to [Grande's] catalog", while Adam White of The Independent called it a disappointment. Writing for Consequence of Sound, Mary Siroky classified "Motive" into "the bad" of the album, writing that "the pulsing duet ultimately falls flat".

=== Year-end lists ===
Alim Kheraj of The Guardian placed "Motive" at number 19 on his list of favorite tracks of 2020.

== Credits and personnel ==
Credits adapted from Tidal and the liner notes of Positions.

Personnel

- Ariana Grande – vocals, background vocals, vocal production, vocal arrangement, audio engineering
- Murda Beatz – production
- Tommy Brown – production
- Mr. Franks – co-production
- Joseph L'Étranger – co-production
- Billy Hickey – audio engineering, mix engineering
- Randy Merrill – mastering
- Serban Ghenea – mixing

Recording and management

- Recorded at Grande's house (Los Angeles, California)
- Mixed at MixStar Studios (Virginia Beach, Virginia)
- Mastered at Sterling Sound (New York, New York)

Notes

- Physical releases of Positions credit Doja Cat as a featured artist.
- Physical releases of Positions credit Grande, Doja Cat, Monét and Charles for "lyrics and melodies".

== Charts ==
Chart performance for "Motive"
Chart (2020)	Peak position
Australia (ARIA)	19
Austria (Ö3 Austria Top 40)	62
Canada Hot 100 (Billboard)	25
France (SNEP)	128
Global 200 (Billboard)	16
Greece International (IFPI)	37
Ireland (IRMA)	13
Lithuania (AGATA)	21
New Zealand (Recorded Music NZ)	29
Portugal (AFP)	28
Singapore (RIAS)	22
Slovakia Singles Digital (ČNS IFPI)	68
Sweden (Sverigetopplistan)	84
Switzerland (Schweizer Hitparade)	63
UK Singles (Official Charts)	16
US Billboard Hot 100	32
US Rolling Stone Top 100	9

== Certifications ==
Certifications and sales for "Motive"
Region	Certification	Certified units/sales
Australia (ARIA)	Platinum	70,000^{‡}
Brazil (Pro-Música Brasil)	3× Platinum	120,000^{‡}
France (SNEP)	Gold	100,000^{‡}
New Zealand (RMNZ)	Platinum	30,000^{‡}
Norway (IFPI Norway)	Gold	30,000^{‡}
Poland (ZPAV)	Gold	25,000^{‡}
Portugal (AFP)	Gold	5,000^{‡}
United Kingdom (BPI)	Gold	400,000^{‡}
United States (RIAA)	Platinum	1,000,000^{‡}
^{‡} Sales+streaming figures based on certification alone.
