= Positions (song) =

2020 single by Ariana Grande

Single by Ariana Grande

from the album Positions
- B-side: "Safety Net"
- Released: October 23, 2020
- Studio: Grande's home; Champagne Therapy (Lynwood)
- Genre: Pop-R&B
- Length: 2:52
- Label: Republic
- Composers: Brian Vincent Bates; Tommy Brown; Nija Charles; Steven Franks; London Holmes; James Jarvis
- Lyricists: Ariana Grande; Nija Charles; Angelina Barrett
- Producers: London on da Track; Tommy Brown; Mr. Franks

Ariana Grande singles chronology
"Rain on Me" (2020)	"Positions" (2020)	"34+35" (2020)

Music video
- "Positions" on YouTube

"Positions" is a song by American singer-songwriter Ariana Grande. It was released on October 23, 2020, by Republic Records as the lead single from Grande's sixth studio album of the same name (2020). The song was written by Grande, Angelina Barrett, Brian Vincent Bates, Nija Charles, James Jarvis, Tommy Brown, London on da Track, and Mr. Franks, and produced by the last three.

"Positions" is a midtempo song blending pop and R&B over trap beats, plucked guitar, and violin. Its lyrics see Grande extend romantic overtures to her love interest. The song was met with generally positive reviews from music critics, who embraced its breezy and mellow sound. The song's music video, directed by Dave Meyers, accompanied the song's release, and depicts Grande as the President of the United States. A live performance music video of "Positions" was released on July 22, 2021. It received a nomination for Best Pop Solo Performance at the 64th Annual Grammy Awards.

"Positions" debuted atop the US Billboard Hot 100, becoming Grande's fifth US number-one single and her third consecutive number-one debut of 2020, following "Stuck with U" and "Rain on Me". It extended her records as the first artist to have five number-one debut singles on the chart and for having all the lead singles of each of her albums debut within the top-10 of the chart. It also debuted at number one on the Billboard Global 200 and Billboard Global Excl. U.S., making "Positions" the first song to simultaneously debut atop both charts and the Hot 100. Elsewhere, the song reached atop the record charts in 16 other territories including Australia, Bulgaria, Canada, Greece, Hungary, Ireland, Israel, Lithuania, Malaysia, New Zealand, and the United Kingdom, giving Grande her seventh number one in the UK. It also peaked in the top 10 of the charts in 30 other countries. "Positions" has also received sales certifications globally.

== Release ==
On October 14, 2020, Grande took to Twitter to announce that her upcoming album was set to be released that same month. On October 17, she posted a slow-motion teaser video of her typing out the word "positions" on a keyboard. The teaser was followed-up by a countdown launched on her website. She posted the cover art and revealed the release date of the song on October 23. Later that day, she posted a snippet of the song to her social media. "Positions" was released for digital download and streaming on October 23, and was serviced to contemporary hit radio stations in the United States four days later.

== Composition ==
"Positions"
A 17-second sample of the chorus of "Positions", with references to sexual innuendos.

"Positions" is a midtempo pop–R&B song with elements of trap. It is composed in the key of D minor with the tempo set to 144 BPM. Lyrically, the song is about Grande describing her dedication to her lover and her willingness to try new things for him. Annie Zaleski of The A.V. Club wrote that the song is "a tune about settling down while preserving your sense of self". Other lyrics, such as the chorus, in which she sings, "Switchin' the positions for you/Cookin' in the kitchen and I’m in the bedroom" include sexual innuendos. Rolling Stone's Brittany Spanos referred to the track as a "straightforward plea to get down and dirty any time, any place". It has been speculated that the song was written about Grande's then-boyfriend (now ex-husband), Dalton Gomez. Others suspected that one of the song's lyrics ("I'm just hopin' I don't repeat history") was a veiled reference to her ex-boyfriend Pete Davidson, due to a pause in between the syllables in "repeat". The song's instrumentation features pizzicato guitar plucking, violin, trap drums, and the sound of crickets chirping. It was described by Dani Blum of Pitchfork as a "slinky sex jam" which "drape[d] [Ariana's] harmonies over hazy synths". The Observer's Kate Hutchinson compared the song's composition to that of Craig David's 2000 single "7 Days".

== Critical reception ==
Professional ratings
Review scores
Source	Rating
The Guardian	4/5 stars
NME	4/5 stars

In a review for The Guardian, Alexis Petridis described "Positions" as "low-key, if hooky and melodically strong pop-R&B". Hannah Mylrea of NME wrote that the song is a "bold introduction to [Grande's] next musical era" despite not being a "balls-to-the-wall pop belter", and described its sound as "breezy" and "mellow", bolstered by strings and early "Justin Timberlake–style" acoustic guitar.

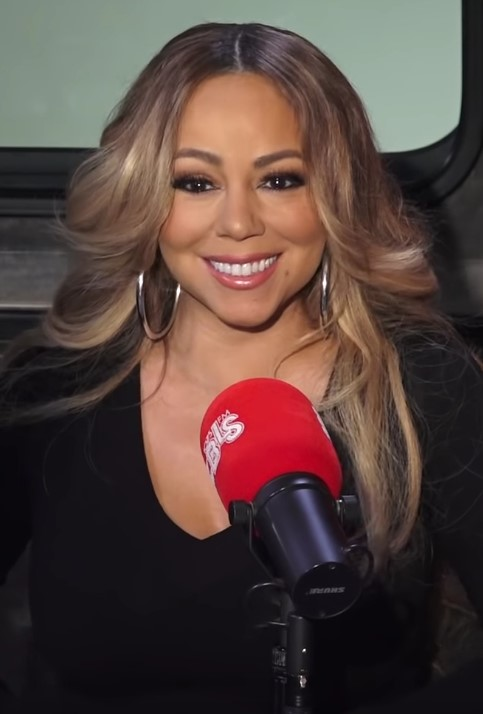
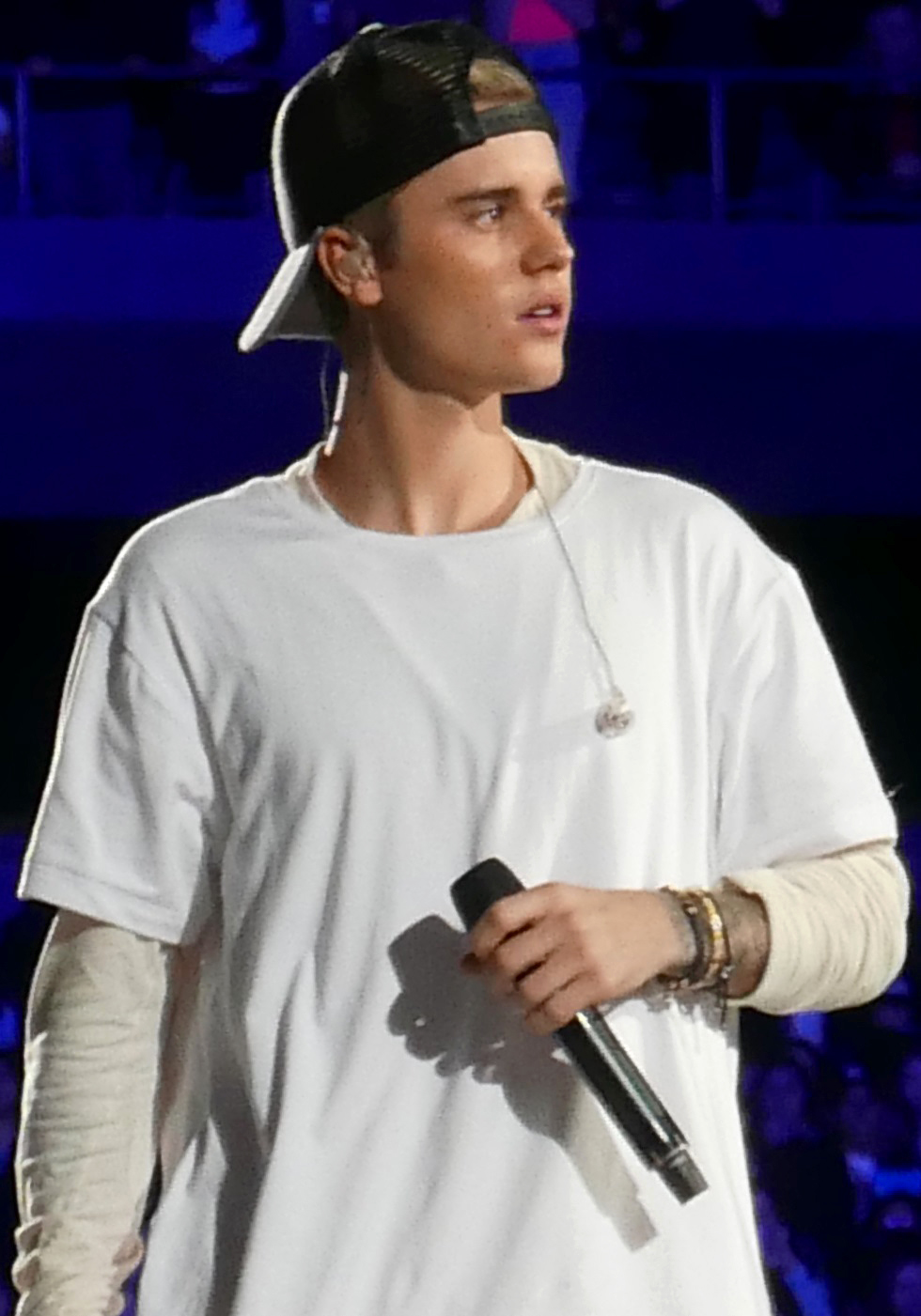
"Positions" was compared to works by Mariah Carey (left) in the late 1990s and Changes, the 2020 album by Justin Bieber (right).

Writing for Vulture, Craig Jenkins labeled the song "delightfully simple" and as "sparse" as Grande's previous songs "Best Mistake" (2014) and "Knew Better" (2016), and found it reminiscent of Justin Bieber's 2020 album, Changes, and Mariah Carey's work in the late 1990s. Jenkins added that "Positions" "swings like rap music but it’s also light, breezy, and short", which he identified as a cause for its success on the charts. Bobby Olivier of Spin called the song a "radio-friendly earworm". Idolator's Mike Wass dubbed the song as the singer's best lead single to date, with an "instantly catchy" chorus. Wass stated that the "slick", "streaming-friendly", R&B-pop tune "worms its way into your consciousness and simply refuses to leave".

Insider writer, Callie Ahlgrim, stated that song is "unassuming" and the "effervescent energy is even more effective within the context of" the rest of the album's tracklist. Another writer, Courteney Larocca, went on to say that the song "made complete sense as the lead single" and that "it doesn't wear itself out or become grating over time". According to Joan Summers of Jezebel, the song sounded "familiar", writing, "Sonically, she has also journeyed back down an excessively well-trodden path...It’s fine! I don’t mind any of it. Really, though, I swear I have heard this song before. Haven’t I heard this song before?" "Positions" was named the "weakest" song on Positions by Mary Siroky of Consequence of Sound, who referred to it as a "perfectly adequate mid-tempo offering that doesn't rise above the stacked pack". Sputnikmusic called the song's beat "unrecognizable" among the rest of the songs on the album.

=== Year-end lists ===
Billboard staff described "Positions" as a "slinky R&B jam" and ranked it as the 21st best song of 2020 stating, "In "Positions", Grande confidently sings about wanting to go “from the kitchen to the bedroom,” owning that women are in fact multidimensional, they further stated "Positions" will forever be remembered for making a statement and providing some levity during a heated moment—one of many in 2020."

Year-end lists for "Positions"
Publication	List	Rank	Ref.
Amazon Music	Best Songs of 2020	31	
Apple Music	The 100 Best Songs of 2020	3	
Billboard	The 100 Best Songs of 2020	21	
Billboard	The 30 Best Pop Songs of 2020	—N/a	
The Diamondback	The Diamondback's 20 Favorite Songs of 2020	15	
The Guardian	Michael Cragg's Best Tracks of 2020	—N/a	
i-D	Best Songs of 2020	—N/a	
PopBuzz	The 20 Best Singles of 2020	9	
The Quietus	Quietus Tracks of the Year 2020	75	
Rolling Stone	Top 100 Songs of 2020	84	
Spotify	Best Pop Songs of 2020	6	
Stereogum	The Top 40 Pop Songs of 2020	11	
Tidal	Songs of the Year 2020	21	
Tidal	Best Pop Songs of 2020	8	

== Accolades ==
Awards and nominations for "Positions"
Year	Organization	Award	Result	Ref(s)
2021	MTV Video Music Awards	Best Pop	Nominated	
2021	MTV Millennial Awards Brazil	Global Hit	Nominated	
2022	Grammy Awards	Best Pop Solo Performance	Nominated	
2022	iHeartRadio Music Awards	Song of the Year	Nominated	

== Commercial performance ==
=== North America ===
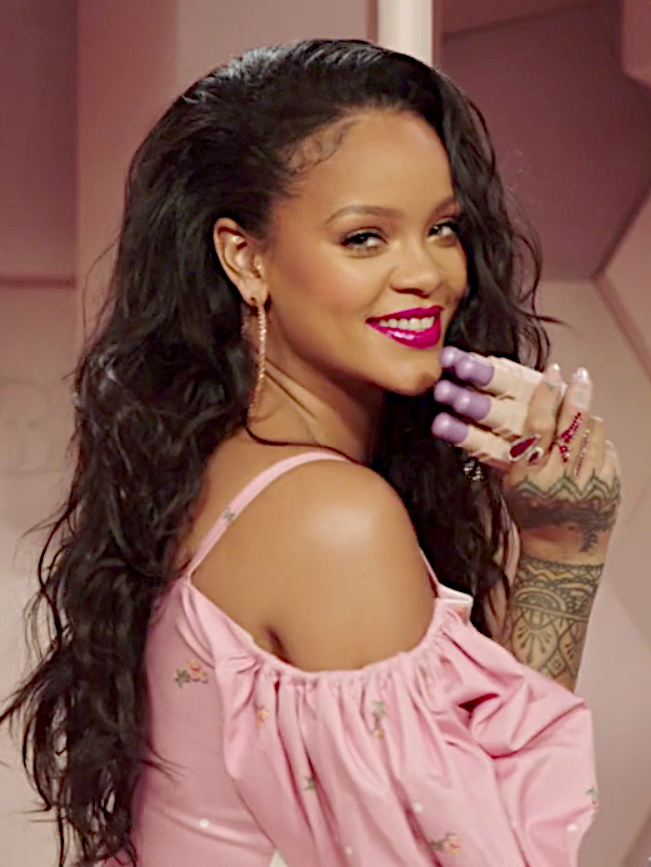
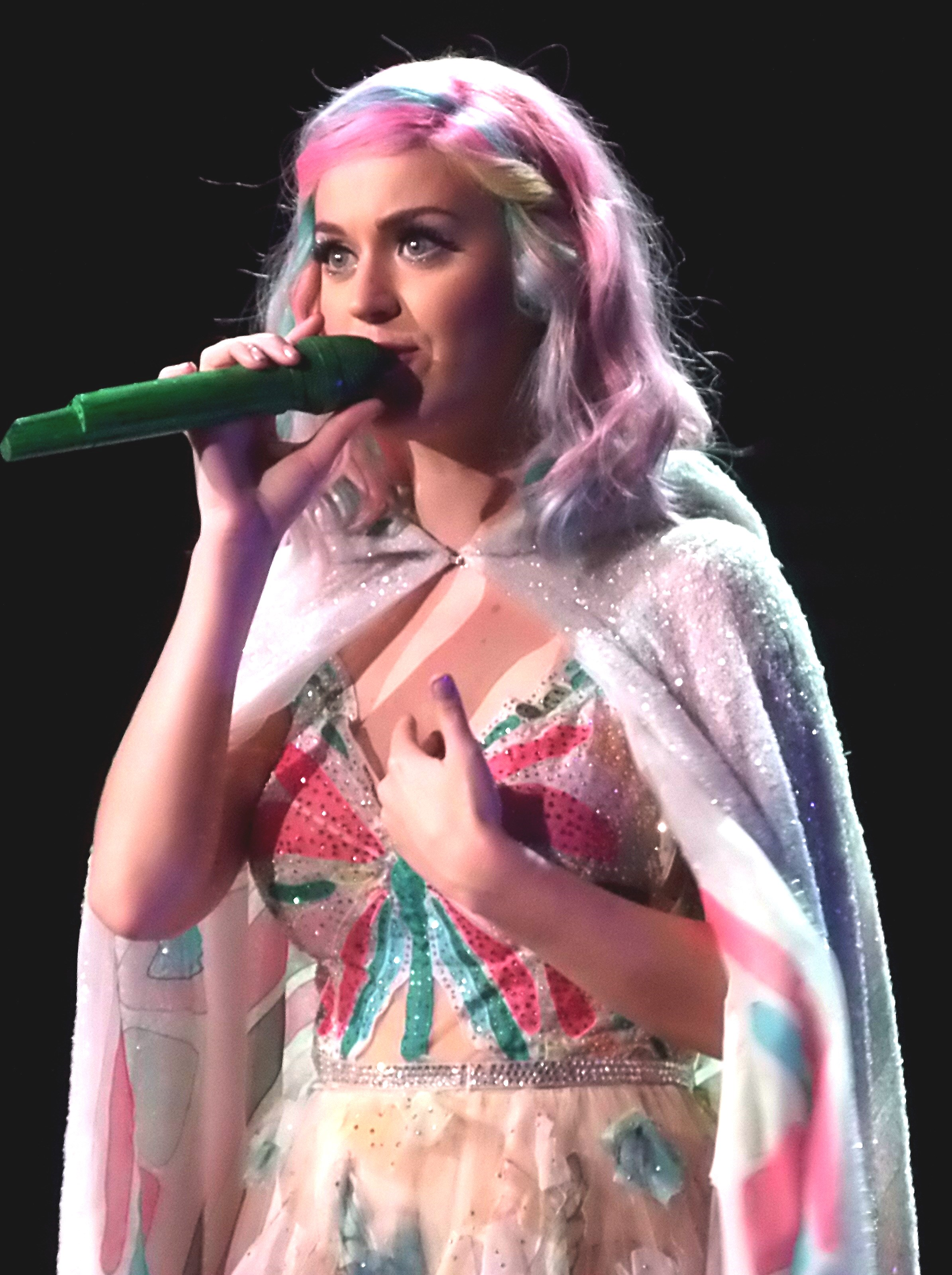
With "Positions" becoming her third number-one single in 2020, Grande became the first female artist to have three number-one singles in a single calendar year since Rihanna (left) and Katy Perry (right) in 2010.

"Positions" debuted at number-one on the Billboard Hot 100, for the week ending November 7, 2020, becoming Grande's fifth number one single in the United States, and third consecutive number one debut in the nation. The song debuted at the top slot on the Streaming Songs chart with 35.3 million U.S. streams and debuted at number two on the Digital Songs chart with 34,000 digital downloads sold in its first week. With the debut of "Positions", Grande further extended her record for the most number one debuts in history with five, while also becoming the first artist to have their first five number one singles all debut at the top. Grande also became the first artist to have the most singles debut at number one in a single calendar year, with three, following her singles "Stuck with U" with Justin Bieber and "Rain on Me" with Lady Gaga. This also made Grande the first artist since Drake to have three number one singles in a single calendar year, but the first woman to do so since Rihanna and Katy Perry did in 2010. "Positions" was also the tenth song to debut at number one in 2020, aiding 2020 in extending its record as the calendar year with the most songs that debuted at number one. "Positions" debuted at the summit of Billboard's Global 200 and Global Excl. U.S. charts, becoming the first song to simultaneously debut atop both Billboard Global charts. In addition, Grande became the first US-born artist to top the Global Excl. US survey.

"Positions" fell one spot to number two in its second week, with over 25.6 million on-demand streams, allowing it to spend a second week atop the Streaming Songs chart. The track was also the Hot 100's top Airplay gainer of the week, with over 27.5 million audience impressions (up 40% from the previous week). With "34+35" debuting at number eight that same week, Grande was the chart's only artist with multiple songs within the top ten. "Positions" spent a total of 17 weeks within the top 10 of the Billboard Hot 100, tying with "Thank U, Next" as Grande's longest-running top 10 single in the United States as a solo artist, until 2026 when "Hate That I Made You Love Me" spent 22 weeks in the top 10 of Billboard Hot 100.

"Positions" peaked at number one on the Mainstream Top 40 airplay chart in December 2020, becoming Grande's seventh number one single and seventeenth top ten single. It remained at number one for seven consecutive weeks, becoming Grande's longest running number one single on the pop airplay chart, surpassing "7 Rings" which topped the chart for six weeks in 2019. It posted the longest reign for a solo song by a woman in nearly eight years, since Taylor Swift's "I Knew You Were Trouble" which also topped the chart for seven weeks in 2013. After spending seven consecutive weeks at number one, "Positions" was dethroned by Grande's own "34+35", making Grande the first artist to replace herself at number one as the only act credited on both tracks. On October 31, 2025, "Positions" was certified 5× Platinum by the Recording Industry Association of America (RIAA) for moving 5 million units in the United States.

In Canada, "Positions" entered the Canadian Hot 100 chart at the top position on the issue dated November 7, 2020, becoming Grande's fifth number one single in the country. Additionally, the track debuted at number two on the Canadian Digital Songs Sales chart. Its certified Quintuple Platinum by the Canadian Recording Industry Association for moving over 400,000 units in Canada.

=== Europe ===
In the United Kingdom, "Positions" debuted at the top of the UK Singles Chart on October 30, 2020, for the week ending date November 5, 2020, becoming Grande's seventh number-one song in Britain. The track garnered over 61,000 digital downloads sold, including 7.6 million streams within its first week of release. With all seven of Grande's number-one singles debuting at the top of the UK Singles Chart, Grande's record of the most number-one single debuts by a female artist was extended, surpassing Madonna, Britney Spears, Rihanna and Cheryl Cole, all of whom have five chart-topping debuts. With seven number-one singles each, Grande joined Elton John, George Michael, Jess Glynne, Justin Bieber, Kylie Minogue, McFly, Michael Jackson, Robbie Williams, Sam Smith, Tinie Tempah, U2, and Beyoncé as one of the artists tied for the ninth-most number-ones on the UK Singles Chart.

In its second week on the chart, "Positions" remained at the number one spot. The same week, parent album Positions debuted at number one on the UK Albums Chart making Grande score a "Official Chart Double". This was the second time Grande achieved this feat; her previous album Thank U, Next and its singles "Break Up with Your Girlfriend, I'm Bored" and "7 Rings" respectively achieved this record in 2019. It remained at number one for a third consecutive week, clocking up over 44,000 chart sales, including 5.4 million streams, becoming Grande's third longest running number one single in the country. "Positions" remained at number one on the UK Singles Chart for the fourth consecutive week earning 44,600 chart sales, including 5.6 million streams, tying with "7 Rings" as Grande's second longest running number one single in the country. It also became the longest running number one single by the female artist released in 2020, surpassing "WAP". It remained at number one for a fifth consecutive week, becoming the third longest-running number one single of 2020 and Grande's second longest running number one single in the country, surpassing "7 Rings". After spending six consecutive weeks at the pole position, it earned Grande her longest running number one single in the United Kingdom, tying with "Thank U, Next", while simultaneously becoming the second longest running number one single of 2020, tying with "Head & Heart" and "Rockstar". On September 19, 2025, "Positions" was certified Double Platinum by the British Phonographic Industry (BPI) for moving 1,200,000 units in the United Kingdom.

In Ireland, "Positions" debuted atop the Irish Singles Chart, becoming Grande's seventh number one single in the country. It was the most streamed and downloaded song of the week dated October 30, 2020, with the song racking up 760,000 streams in its debut week. With this feat, Grande tied with Lady Gaga and Calvin Harris as the artist with the sixth-most number one singles on the Irish Singles Chart. Furthermore, Grande also surpassed the record for the amount of number one singles since 2010 for a female artist, surpassing Rihanna. It also remained at the top spot for three consecutive weeks.

=== Oceania ===
In Australia, "Positions" debuted at number one on the ARIA Singles Chart dated November 2, 2020, becoming Grande's fourth number one single in the country. "Positions" was also Grande's third top-three entry for 2020 after charting earlier in the year with "Stuck with U" and "Rain on Me". It remained at number one for two consecutive weeks. Its certified Quadruple Platinum by the Australian Recording Industry Association in 2023 for moving over 280,000 equivalent units in Australia.

In New Zealand "Positions" debuted at number one on the New Zealand Singles Chart, becoming Grande's sixth number one single in the country. It was also Grande's second number one single for 2020 after charting earlier in the year with "Stuck with U". Its certified Triple Platinum by the Recording Industry Association of New Zealand for moving over 90,000 units in the New Zealand.

== Music video ==
The accompanying music video for "Positions" was filmed in September and was released along with the song on October 23, 2020. The video was directed by Dave Meyers, and depicts Grande as the President of the United States. The concept for the video was conceived by Grande's now ex-husband, Dalton Gomez. Many of the video's scenes were filmed at the Richard Nixon Presidential Library and Museum in Yorba Linda, California. The video received over one million views on YouTube within an hour of its release. On October 26, a behind-the-scenes video was posted to Grande's YouTube channel. As of August 2025, the music video reached the 625 million views.

=== Synopsis and reception ===
The song's music video sees Grande fulfilling various presidential and domestic tasks, including overseeing a Cabinet meeting, signing executive orders in the Oval Office, giving a medal to postal workers (a response to the 2020 United States Postal Service crisis), walking dogs on the South Lawn, and preparing food in a White House kitchen. Throughout the video, she wears a number of outfits reminiscent of former First Lady of the United States, Jacqueline Kennedy Onassis. It features cameos from frequent collaborators Tayla Parx and Victoria Monét, as well as Grande's mother, Joan. Critics noted a connection between the video's theme and the final United States presidential debate of 2020, which took place hours before the release of the video. The following people also made cameos in the video; Darrion Gallegos, Joan Grande, Josh Liu, Misha Lambert, Nija Charles, Paula Ayotte, Taya Shawki, Tayla Parx, Tyler Ford and Victoria Monét.

In Billboard's staff picks of the 25 best music videos of 2020, the one for "Positions" was placed at number 6, with Christine Werthman commenting that "less than two weeks before Election Day, Grande allowed us to fantasize about a new, incredibly well-dressed regime in the White House in her scene-switching music video", writing that "Grande takes charge and shows strength in every setting". Vogue named the music video one of the most stylish of 2020.

== Credits and personnel ==
Credits adapted from Tidal and the liner notes of the CD single.

Personnel

- Ariana Grande – vocals, background vocals, songwriting, vocal production, arranging, engineering
- London on da Track – production
- Tommy Brown – production
- Mr. Franks – production
- James Jarvis – guitar
- Billy Hickey – engineering
- Serban Ghenea – mixing
- Randy Merrill – mastering
- Peter Lee Johnson – violin

Recording and management

- Recorded at Grande's house and Champagne Therapy Studios (Los Angeles, California)
- Mixed at MixStar Studios (Virginia Beach, Virginia)
- Mastered at Sterling Sound (New York, New York)

Notes

- Physical releases of Positions credit Grande, Charles and Barrett for "lyrics and melodies".

== Charts ==
=== Weekly charts ===
Weekly chart performance
Chart (2020–2021)	Peak position
Argentina Hot 100 (Billboard)	42
Australia (ARIA)	1
Austria (Ö3 Austria Top 40)	7
Belgium (Ultratop 50 Flanders)	14
Belgium (Ultratop 50 Wallonia)	6
Bolivia Anglo (Monitor Latino)	2
Brazil (Top 100 Brasil)	67
Bulgaria (PROPHON)	7
Canada Hot 100 (Billboard)	1
Canada CHR/Top 40 (Billboard)	3
Canada Hot AC (Billboard)	11
Colombia Anglo (Monitor Latino)	3
Croatia (HRT)	13
Czech Republic Singles Digital (ČNS IFPI)	23
Denmark (Tracklisten)	4
El Salvador (Monitor Latino)	10
Euro Digital Song Sales (Billboard)	3
Finland (Suomen virallinen lista)	7
France (SNEP)	20
Germany (GfK)	9
Global 200 (Billboard)	1
Greece International (IFPI)	1
Guatemala Anglo (Monitor Latino)	4
Hungary (Rádiós Top 40)	28
Hungary (Single Top 40)	1
Hungary (Stream Top 40)	2
Iceland (Tónlistinn)	4
Ireland (IRMA)	1
Israel (Media Forest)	1
Italy (FIMI)	18
Japan (Japan Hot 100)	39
Lebanon (OLT20)	2
Lithuania (AGATA)	1
Malaysia (RIM)	1
Mexico (Billboard Mexican Airplay)	17
Netherlands (Dutch Top 40)	9
Netherlands (Single Top 100)	6
New Zealand (Recorded Music NZ)	1
Norway (VG-lista)	7
Panama Anglo (Monitor Latino)	4
Peru Anglo (Monitor Latino)	2
Portugal (AFP)	4
Puerto Rico (Monitor Latino)	12
Romania (Airplay 100)	42
Scottish Singles Sales (Official Charts)	3
Singapore (RIAS)	1
Slovakia Airplay (ČNS IFPI)	80
Slovakia Singles Digital (ČNS IFPI)	7
South Korea (Gaon)	160
Spain (PROMUSICAE)	23
Sweden (Sverigetopplistan)	10
Switzerland (Schweizer Hitparade)	5
UK Singles (Official Charts)	1
US Billboard Hot 100	1
US Adult Contemporary (Billboard)	22
US Adult Pop Airplay (Billboard)	9
US Dance Airplay (Billboard)	6
US Pop Airplay (Billboard)	1
US Rhythmic Airplay (Billboard)	7
US Rolling Stone Top 100	1

=== Monthly charts ===
Monthly chart performance of "Positions"
Chart (November 2020)	Position
Brazil (Top 50 Streaming)	20

=== Year-end charts ===
2020 year-end chart performance of "Positions"
Chart (2020)	Position
Hungary (Single Top 40)	80
Hungary (Stream Top 40)	60
Netherlands (Dutch Top 40)	79

2021 year-end chart performance of "Positions"
Chart (2021)	Position
Australia (ARIA)	55
Brazil Streaming (Pro-Música Brasil)	133
Canada (Canadian Hot 100)	22
Denmark (Tracklisten)	98
Global 200 (Billboard)	19
Portugal (AFP)	82
UK Singles (OCC)	91
US Billboard Hot 100	14
US Adult Top 40 (Billboard)	31
US Dance/Mix Show Airplay (Billboard)	15
US Mainstream Top 40 (Billboard)	2
US Rhythmic (Billboard)	33

== Certifications ==
Certifications
Region	Certification	Certified units/sales
Australia (ARIA)	4× Platinum	280,000^{‡}
Austria (IFPI Austria)	Platinum	30,000^{‡}
Belgium (BRMA)	Gold	20,000^{‡}
Brazil (Pro-Música Brasil)	4× Diamond	640,000^{‡}
Canada (Music Canada)	6× Platinum	480,000^{‡}
Denmark (IFPI Danmark)	Platinum	90,000^{‡}
France (SNEP)	Platinum	200,000^{‡}
Germany (BVMI)	Gold	200,000^{‡}
Hungary (MAHASZ)	Gold	2,000^{‡}
Italy (FIMI)	Gold	35,000^{‡}
Mexico (AMPROFON)	2× Platinum+Gold	150,000^{‡}
New Zealand (RMNZ)	3× Platinum	90,000^{‡}
Norway (IFPI Norway)	2× Platinum	120,000^{‡}
Poland (ZPAV)	2× Platinum	100,000^{‡}
Portugal (AFP)	Platinum	10,000^{‡}
Spain (Promusicae)	Platinum	60,000^{‡}
United Kingdom (BPI)	2× Platinum	1,200,000^{‡}
United States (RIAA)	5× Platinum	5,000,000^{‡}
Streaming
Greece (IFPI Greece)	Platinum	2,000,000^{†}
Japan (RIAJ)	Gold	50,000,000^{†}
Sweden (GLF)	Platinum	8,000,000^{†}
^{‡} Sales+streaming figures based on certification alone.^{†} Streaming-only figures based on certification alone.

== Release history ==
Release dates and formats
Region	Date	Format(s)	Label	Ref.
Various	October 23, 2020	CD; digital download; streaming	Republic	
United States	October 26, 2020	Hot adult contemporary radio	Republic	
United States	October 27, 2020	Contemporary hit radio; rhythmic contemporary radio	Republic	
Italy	November 6, 2020	Radio airplay	Universal	
Various	January 9, 2026	7-inch vinyl	Republic	

== See also ==
- List of Billboard Global 200 number ones of 2020
- List of Billboard Hot 100 number ones of 2020
- List of Billboard Hot 100 number-one singles of the 2020s
- List of Billboard Hot 100 top-ten singles in 2020
- List of Billboard Streaming Songs number ones of 2020
- List of Canadian Hot 100 number-one singles of 2020
- List of number-one singles from the 2020s (New Zealand)
- List of number-one singles of 2020 (Australia)
- List of number-one singles of 2020 (Ireland)
- List of number-one songs of 2020 (Malaysia)
- List of number-one songs of 2020 (Singapore)
- List of top 10 singles in 2020 (Australia)
- List of top 10 singles in 2020 (Ireland)
- List of UK Singles Chart number ones of the 2020s
- List of UK top-ten singles in 2020
