= Ariana Grande discography =

Recordings by American singer

- Ariana Grande performing in July 2026
- Studio albums: 8
- EPs: 3
- Soundtrack albums: 2
- Live albums: 2
- Compilation albums: 1
- Remix albums: 1
- Singles: 63
- Promotional singles: 20

American singer, songwriter, and actress Ariana Grande has released 8 studio albums, 2 soundtrack albums, 2 live albums, 1 compilation album, 1 remix album, 3 extended plays (EPs), 63 singles (including 17 as a featured artist), and 20 promotional singles. With over 90 to 100 million pure sales worldwide, Grande is one of the best-selling music artists of all time. In the United States, she has sold over 183.3 million units, across albums, singles, and features (when physical, downloads and streaming equivalent sales are combined), making her amongst the highest-certified artists according to the Recording Industry Association of America (RIAA). As a lead artist, she has sold 16 million albums, 141 million digital singles units, and 157 million in overall units (albums and singles), making her the third-highest-certified female digital singles artist and the fourth-highest-certified female overall by the RIAA, respectively. All of her albums have been certified Platinum or higher by the organization. According to Luminate, Grande has moved 22.4 million album units, and garnered over 23.6 billion streams across lead artist credits in the US. She has surpassed 100 million equivalent album sales worldwide and sold over 58.3 million units in singles consumption in the UK. Having gathered over 105 billion consumed streams thus far, Grande is the most streamed female artist ever. She is also the most streamed female artist of the 2010s on Spotify and Apple Music. As of April 2026, Grande is the second most streamed female artist and fifth most streamed artist overall on Spotify. She has achieved 110 chart entries on the US Billboard Hot 100 as of August 2026—making her the fourth woman to surpass the 100-entry mark and the artist with the third-highest total number of entries; these include 10 number-one hits and 25 top-10 songs.

After signing with Republic Records, Grande released her debut single, "Put Your Hearts Up", in December 2011. In April 2013, she made her chart debut with "The Way" featuring Mac Miller, which peaked at number nine on the Hot 100. Her debut studio album, Yours Truly (2013), reached the top 10 in Australia, Canada, Denmark, and the United Kingdom, while debuting at number one on the US Billboard 200, and was subsequently certified platinum by the RIAA. Her first extended play (EP), Christmas Kisses (2013), in which was re-released in December 2014 in Japan with the bonus track, "Santa Tell Me". The single is now considered a modern Christmas standard for its popularity during the Christmas season throughout the years; it peaked at number five on the Hot 100 and the Billboard Global 200. Her second studio album, My Everything (2014), became her second consecutive number-one record in the US, and has been certified four-times Platinum by the RIAA. Three singles—"Problem" (featuring Iggy Azalea), "Break Free" (featuring Zedd), and "Bang Bang" (with Jessie J and Nicki Minaj)—peaked at number two, four, and three respectively on Hot 100 and charted within the top 10 simultaneously, making Grande the second lead female artist to achieve the feat. "Problem" and "Bang Bang" also became her first two number-one singles on the UK Singles Chart. With its fourth single being Grande and the Weeknd's collaboration "Love Me Harder", also peaking at number seven, Grande became the only artist to score four top-10 songs on the Hot 100 in 2014.

Her third studio album, Dangerous Woman (2016), topped the charts in Italy, Norway, New Zealand, and the UK. It also peaked at number two in the US and received a three-times platinum certification by RIAA. It sold more than 20 million units worldwide, becoming Grande's highest-selling album to date. Its lead single of the same name peaked at number eight on the Hot 100, making her the first and only artist in the chart's history to debut in the top 10 with the lead single from each of her first three albums. Its third single, "Side to Side" featuring Minaj, reached the top five in the US, Canada, New Zealand, and the UK. Her fourth studio album, Sweetener (2018), reached at number one in the US, Australia, Italy, and Norway. It was later certified two-times Platinum by the RIAA. Its lead single, "No Tears Left to Cry", reached the top five in the US, Australia, Canada, Germany, Italy, the Netherlands, New Zealand, and the UK. Her fifth studio album, Thank U, Next (2019), landed atop the charts in the US, Australia, Canada, Denmark, Norway, New Zealand, the UK. The album was certified two-times Platinum by the RIAA, and broke numerous chart and streaming records, including the largest streaming week for a pop album and for a female album in the US. Its lead single of the same name and the second single, "7 Rings", with both peaked at number one in the US, Australia, Canada, New Zealand, and the UK. Its third single, "Break Up with Your Girlfriend, I'm Bored", peaked at number two in the US and topped the singles chart in the UK. With these singles, Grande became the first solo artist ever and only the second artist after the Beatles to occupy the top three spots on the Hot 100 simultaneously. She broke the record for the most number-one debuts on the Hot 100 with the 2020 collaborations "Stuck with U" (with Justin Bieber) and "Rain on Me" (with Lady Gaga).

Her sixth studio album, Positions (2020), had both the album and its lead single of the same name debuted at number one in the US, Canada, and the UK. With this, she became the first artist to accumulate three number-one debuts in a calendar year, the first artist to have five number-one debuts on the Hot 100 and the first to have their first five number-ones debut at the top. Its second single, "34+35", peaked at number two in the US, following a remix with Doja Cat and Megan Thee Stallion. Grande garnered her sixth and seventh number-one singles on the Hot 100 with remixes of the Weeknd's "Save Your Tears" in 2021 and "Die for You" in 2023. Her seventh studio album, Eternal Sunshine (2024), debuted atop the US Billboard 200. She garnered her eighth and ninth Hot 100 chart-toppers with the album's singles "Yes, And?" and "We Can't Be Friends (Wait for Your Love)", becoming her sixth and seventh to debut on that chart's pole position respectively. The soundtrack albums—Wicked: The Soundtrack and Wicked: For Good – The Soundtrack—for the 2024 film adaptation and its 2025 sequel of the musical Wicked, in which Grande recorded most of the songs, both peaked at number two in the US. Her eighth studio album, Petal (2026), topped the charts in 20 countries, including the US, the UK, France, Canada, and Australia. The lead single, "Hate That I Made You Love Me", became her tenth number-one on the Hot 100 and topped the UK Singles Chart.

== Albums ==
=== Studio albums ===
List of albums, with selected details, chart positions, sales figures, and certifications
Title	Details	Peak chart positions										Sales	Certifications
Title	Details	US	AUS	CAN	DEN	FRA	ITA	NOR	NZ	SWI	UK	Sales	Certifications
Yours Truly	Released: August 30, 2013; Label: Republic; Formats: CD, LP, digital download, streaming	1	6	2	10	183	—	33	11	57	7	US: 650,000 (Note: United States sales figures for Yours Truly as of August 2023.); UK: 198,221 (Note: United Kingdom sales figures for Yours Truly as of August 2026.)	RIAA: Platinum; ARIA: Gold; BPI: Gold; IFPI NOR: Gold; IFPI SWI: Gold; MC: Platinum; RMNZ: Platinum
My Everything	Released: August 22, 2014; Label: Republic; Formats: CD, LP, digital download, streaming	1	1	1	2	18	4	1	3	2	3	US: 759,000 (Note: United States sales figures for My Everything as of June 2020.); UK: 738,847 (Note: United Kingdom sales figures (combined with album-equivalent units) for My Everything as of August 2026.)	RIAA: 4× Platinum; ARIA: 2× Platinum; BPI: 2× Platinum; FIMI: Platinum; IFPI DEN: 3× Platinum; IFPI NOR: 6× Platinum; IFPI SWI: 3× Platinum; MC: 5× Platinum; RMNZ: 4× Platinum; SNEP: Platinum
Dangerous Woman	Released: May 20, 2016; Label: Republic; Formats: CD, LP, digital download, streaming	2	1	2	5	8	1	1	1	3	1	US: 429,000 (Note: United States sales figures for Dangerous Woman as of June 2020.); CAN: 36,462 (Note: Canada sales figures of Dangerous Woman as of December 2016.); FRA: 15,000 (Note: France sales figures for Dangerous Woman as of January 2017.); UK: 637,697 (Note: United Kingdom sales figures (combined with album-equivalent units) for Dangerous Woman as of August 2026.)	RIAA: 3× Platinum; ARIA: 2× Platinum; BPI: 2× Platinum; FIMI: Platinum; IFPI DEN: 3× Platinum; IFPI NOR: 2× Platinum; IFPI SWI: 3× Platinum; MC: 4× Platinum; RMNZ: 4× Platinum; SNEP: 2× Platinum
Sweetener	Released: August 17, 2018; Label: Republic; Formats: CD, LP, digital download, cassette, streaming	1	1	1	2	2	1	1	1	1	1	US: 321,000 (Note: United States sales figures for Sweetener as of June 2020.); UK: 505,599 (Note: United Kingdom sales figures (combined with album-equivalent units) for Sweetener as of August 2026.)	RIAA: 2× Platinum; ARIA: Platinum; BPI: Platinum; FIMI: Platinum; IFPI DEN: Platinum; IFPI NOR: Platinum; IFPI SWI: Platinum; MC: 3× Platinum; RMNZ: 3× Platinum; SNEP: Platinum
Thank U, Next	Released: February 8, 2019; Label: Republic; Formats: CD, LP, digital download, cassette, streaming	1	1	1	1	3	2	1	1	2	1	US: 302,000 (Note: United States sales figures for Thank U, Next as of June 2020.); CAN: 25,000 (Note: Canada sales figures for Thank U, Next as of January 2020.); FRA: 20,000 (Note: France sales figures for Thank U, Next as of June 2021.); UK: 614,831 (Note: United Kingdom sales figures (combined with album-equivalent units) for Thank U, Next as of August 2026.)	RIAA: 2× Platinum; ARIA: Platinum; BPI: 2× Platinum; FIMI: Platinum; IFPI DEN: 2× Platinum; IFPI NOR: 4× Platinum; IFPI SWI: 4× Platinum; MC: 4× Platinum; RMNZ: 4× Platinum; SNEP: 2× Platinum
Positions	Released: October 30, 2020; Label: Republic; Formats: CD, LP, digital download, cassette, streaming	1	2	1	2	8	8	1	1	4	1	US: 158,000 (Note: United States sales figures for Positions, including its first week (42,000), second week (8,000), and sales between January 1 and July 1, 2021 (108,000).); FRA: 26,000 (Note: France sales figures for Positions as of January 2021.); UK: 346,216 (Note: United Kingdom sales figures (combined with album-equivalent units) for Positions as of August 2026.)	RIAA: 2× Platinum; ARIA: Platinum; BPI: Platinum; FIMI: Gold; IFPI DEN: Platinum; IFPI NOR: Platinum; IFPI SWI: 2× Platinum; MC: 2× Platinum; RMNZ: 2× Platinum; SNEP: Platinum
Eternal Sunshine	Released: March 8, 2024; Label: Republic; Formats: CD, LP, digital download, cassette, streaming	1	1	1	1	2	4	1	1	2	1	US: 366,850 (Note: United States sales figures for Eternal Sunshine in 2024 (209,100), and 2025 (157,750), including its first week (77,000), second week (13,000), third week (8,000), sixteenth week (17,000), and fifty-sixth week (61,000).); CAN: 6,000 (Note: Canada sales figures for Eternal Sunshine as of June 2024.); FRA: 44,000 (Note: France sales figures for Eternal Sunshine as of June 2024.); UK: 407,279 (Note: United Kingdom sales figures (combined with album-equivalent units) for Eternal Sunshine as of August 2026.)	RIAA: 2× Platinum; ARIA: Platinum; BPI: Platinum; FIMI: Gold; IFPI DEN: Platinum; IFPI NOR: Platinum; MC: Platinum; RMNZ: 2× Platinum; SNEP: Platinum
Petal	Released: July 31, 2026; Label: Babydoll, Republic; Formats: CD, LP, digital download, cassette, streaming	1	1	1	1	1	1	1	1	1	1	US: 240,440 (Note: United States sales figures for Petal as of August 2026, including its first (168,000), second week (21,268), third week (7,264), fourth week (5,889), fifth week (3,899), sixth week (19,864), and seventh week (12,256).)	BPI: Gold; SNEP: Gold
"—" denotes a recording that did not chart or was not released in that territory.

=== Soundtrack albums ===
Title	Details	Peak chart positions										Sales	Certifications
Title	Details	US	AUS	AUT	BEL (FL)	CAN	GER	NLD	NZ	SPA	UK Com.	Sales	Certifications
Wicked: The Soundtrack (with Wicked Movie Cast and Cynthia Erivo)	Released: November 22, 2024; Label: Republic, Verve; Formats: CD, LP, digital download, streaming	2	3	6	6	9	16	8	3	6	1	US: 85,000 (Note: United States first week sales figures for Wicked: The Soundtrack.); UK: 9,435 (Note: United Kingdom first week sales figures for Wicked: The Soundtrack.)	RIAA: Platinum; BPI: Gold; RMNZ: Gold
Wicked: For Good – The Soundtrack (with Wicked Movie Cast and Cynthia Erivo)	Released: November 21, 2025; Label: Republic, Verve; Formats: CD, LP, digital download, streaming	2	1	6	3	9	6	1	5	5	1	US: 85,000 (Note: United States first week sales figures for Wicked: For Good – The Soundtrack.)	BPI: Silver

=== Live albums ===
Title	Details	Peak chart positions								Sales
Title	Details	US	AUS	FRA	JPN	NLD	POR	SWI	UK Com.	Sales
K Bye for Now (SWT Live)	Released: December 23, 2019; Label: Republic; Format: CD, LP, digital download, streaming	79	89	112	56	57	12	93	—	US: 4,000 (Note: United States sales figures for K Bye for Now (SWT Live) as of June 2020.)
Wicked: One Wonderful Night (Live) – The Soundtrack (with Cynthia Erivo)	Released: November 7, 2025; Label: Republic, Verve; Format: Digital download, streaming	—	—	—	—	—	—	—	20	
"—" denotes a recording that did not chart or was not released in that territory.

=== Compilation albums ===
Title	Details	Peaks	Sales
Title	Details	JPN	Sales
The Best	Released: September 27, 2017 (JPN); Label: Universal Music Japan; Format: CD, Blu-ray, digital download	2	JPN: 23,083 (Note: Japan first week sales figures for The Best.)

=== Remix albums ===
Title	Details	Peaks	Sales
Title	Details	JPN	Sales
The Remix	Released: May 25, 2015 (JPN); Label: Universal Music Japan; Format: CD, digital download	32	JPN: 1,542 (Note: Japan first week sales figures for The Remix.)

== Extended plays ==
Title	Details	Peak chart positions									Sales	Certifications
Title	Details	US	US Hol.	AUS	CAN	ITA	JPN	NZ	SWE	UK Vinyl	Sales	Certifications
Christmas Kisses	Released: December 17, 2013 (US); Label: Republic; Format: CD, digital download, streaming	—	39	—	—	—	25	16	—	—	US: 16,000 (Note: United States sales figures for Christmas Kisses as of March 2016.)	RMNZ: Gold
Christmas & Chill	Released: December 18, 2015; Label: Republic; Format: CD, LP, digital download, streaming	34	3	49	43	36	47	—	30	39	US: 52,000 (Note: United States sales figures for Christmas & Chill as of June 2020.)	
"—" denotes a recording that did not chart or was not released in that territory.

=== Live extended plays ===
Title	Details
Positions (Vevo Official Live Performances)	Released: October 30, 2025; Label: Republic; Format: Digital download, streaming

== Singles ==
=== As lead artist ===
==== 2010s ====
List of singles as lead artist released in the 2010s, showing year released, selected chart positions, sales figures, certifications, and originating album
Title	Year	Peak chart positions										Sales	Certifications	Album
Title	Year	US	AUS	CAN	DEN	GER	ITA	NLD	NZ	SWE	UK	Sales	Certifications	Album
"The Way" (featuring Mac Miller)	2013	9	37	33	—	—	—	22	31	—	41	US: 2,400,000 (Note: United States sales figures for "The Way" as of June 2020.)	RIAA: 6× Platinum; ARIA: 3× Platinum; BPI: Gold; MC: Platinum; RMNZ: 2× Platinum	Yours Truly
"Baby I"	2013	21	67	57	—	—	—	39	—	—	145	US: 141,000 (Note: United States first week sales figures for "Baby I".)	RIAA: Platinum; ARIA: Gold; RMNZ: Gold	Yours Truly
"Right There" (featuring Big Sean)	2013	84	51	—	—	—	—	—	—	—	113		RIAA: Platinum; ARIA: Gold; RMNZ: Gold	Yours Truly
"Problem" (featuring Iggy Azalea)	2014	2	2	3	5	19	12	10	1	5	1	WW: 9,000,000 (Note: Worldwide sales figures (combined with equivalent track streams) for "Problem" as of December 2014.); US: 3,700,000 (Note: United States sales figures for "Problem" as of June 2020.); UK: 106,000 (Note: United Kingdom first week sales figures for "Problem".)	RIAA: 8× Platinum; ARIA: 8× Platinum; BPI: 2× Platinum; BVMI: Platinum; FIMI: 2× Platinum; GLF: 3× Platinum; IFPI DEN: 2× Platinum; MC: 4× Platinum; NVPI: 2× Platinum; RMNZ: 3× Platinum	My Everything
"Break Free" (featuring Zedd)	2014	4	3	5	19	12	16	6	5	6	16	US: 1,900,000 (Note: United States sales figures for "Break Free" as of June 2020.); UK: 687,000 (Note: United Kingdom sales figures for "Break Free" as of January 2019, including downloads and streaming.)	RIAA: 5× Platinum; ARIA: 7× Platinum; BPI: 2× Platinum; BVMI: Platinum; FIMI: 2× Platinum; GLF: 4× Platinum; IFPI DEN: 2× Platinum; MC: 5× Platinum; NVPI: 2× Platinum; RMNZ: 3× Platinum	My Everything
"Bang Bang" (Note: "Bang Bang" also appears on Jessie J's third studio album Sweet Talker.) (with Jessie J and Nicki Minaj)	2014	3	4	3	10	13	24	7	4	15	1	US: 3,500,000 (Note: United States sales figures for "Bang Bang" as of June 2020.); UK: 554,197 (Note: United Kingdom sales figures for "Bang Bang" as of September 2017.)	RIAA: Diamond; ARIA: 5× Platinum; BPI: 4× Platinum; BVMI: Platinum; FIMI: 2× Platinum; GLF: 4× Platinum; IFPI DEN: 2× Platinum; MC: 6× Platinum; RMNZ: 5× Platinum	My Everything
"Love Me Harder" (with the Weeknd)	2014	7	19	10	18	35	17	12	28	26	48	US: 1,300,000 (Note: United States sales figures for "Love Me Harder" as of June 2020.)	RIAA: 5× Platinum; ARIA: 6× Platinum; BPI: Platinum; BVMI: Gold; FIMI: Platinum; GLF: 2× Platinum; IFPI DEN: Platinum; MC: 4× Platinum; RMNZ: 3× Platinum	My Everything
"One Last Time"	2015	13	15	12	19	60	6	11	22	22	2	US: 918,000 (Note: United States sales figures for "One Last Time" as of June 2020.); UK: 2,840,000 (Note: United Kingdom sales figures (combined with equivalent track streams) for "One Last Time" as of August 2026.)	RIAA: 4× Platinum; ARIA: 8× Platinum; BPI: 4× Platinum; BVMI: Gold; FIMI: 3× Platinum; GLF: 3× Platinum; IFPI DEN: 2× Platinum; MC: 5× Platinum; RMNZ: 4× Platinum	My Everything
"E Più Ti Penso" (with Andrea Bocelli)	2015	—	—	—	—	—	—	—	—	—	—			Cinema
"Focus" (Note: "Focus" was originally intended to be the lead single from Grande's third studio album, Dangerous Woman (2016), but was later cut from the tracklist, only appearing as a bonus track on the Japanese edition of the album.)	2015	7	10	8	30	18	8	9	16	14	10	US: 490,000 (Note: United States sales figures for "Focus" as of April 2018.)	RIAA: 2× Platinum; ARIA: Platinum; BPI: Gold; FIMI: Platinum; GLF: Platinum; IFPI DEN: Gold; MC: Gold; RMNZ: Gold	Non-album single
"Dangerous Woman"	2016	8	18	10	31	30	19	21	16	30	17	US: 1,150,000 (Note: United States sales figures for "Dangerous Woman" as of June 2020.)	RIAA: 6× Platinum; ARIA: 5× Platinum; BPI: 2× Platinum; BVMI: Gold; FIMI: Platinum; GLF: 2× Platinum; IFPI DEN: Platinum; MC: 6× Platinum; RMNZ: 3× Platinum	Dangerous Woman
"Into You"	2016	13	11	13	30	49	29	21	9	31	14	US: 792,000 (Note: United States sales figures for "Into You" as of June 2020.); UK: 2,320,000 (Note: United Kingdom sales figures (combined with equivalent track streams) for "Into You" as of August 2026.)	RIAA: 7× Platinum; ARIA: 9× Platinum; BPI: 4× Platinum; BVMI: Platinum; FIMI: 2× Platinum; GLF: 3× Platinum; IFPI DEN: 2× Platinum; MC: 8× Platinum; RMNZ: 5× Platinum	Dangerous Woman
"Side to Side" (featuring Nicki Minaj)	2016	4	3	4	13	24	28	11	2	13	4	US: 1,170,000 (Note: United States sales figures for "Side to Side" as of June 2020.)	RIAA: 8× Platinum; ARIA: 8× Platinum; BPI: 3× Platinum; BVMI: Platinum; FIMI: 2× Platinum; GLF: 3× Platinum; IFPI DEN: 2× Platinum; MC: 8× Platinum; RMNZ: 5× Platinum	Dangerous Woman
"Everyday" (featuring Future)	2017	55	96	54	—	—	—	—	— (Note: "Everyday" did not enter the NZ Top 40 Singles Chart, but peaked at number three on the NZ Heatseekers Singles Chart.)	—	123		RIAA: 2× Platinum; ARIA: 2× Platinum; BPI: Gold; IFPI DEN: Gold; MC: 2× Platinum; RMNZ: Platinum	Dangerous Woman
"Beauty and the Beast" (with John Legend)	2017	87	64	70	—	—	—	—	— (Note: "Beauty and the Beast" did not enter the NZ Top 40 Singles Chart, but peaked at number six on the NZ Heatseekers Singles Chart.)	—	52	US: 27,000 (Note: United States first week sales figures for "Beauty and the Beast".)	RIAA: Platinum; ARIA: Platinum; BPI: Silver; RMNZ: Gold	Beauty and the Beast
"No Tears Left to Cry"	2018	3	1	2	6	2	6	4	4	10	2	US: 532,000 (Note: United States sales figures for "No Tears Left to Cry" as of June 2020.); UK: 2,270,000 (Note: United Kingdom sales figures (combined with equivalent track streams) for "No Tears Left to Cry" as of August 2026.)	RIAA: 6× Platinum; ARIA: 8× Platinum; BPI: 3× Platinum; BVMI: Gold; FIMI: Platinum; GLF: 3× Platinum; IFPI DEN: Platinum; MC: 7× Platinum; RMNZ: 4× Platinum	Sweetener
"God Is a Woman"	2018	8	5	5	17	20	27	19	5	12	4	US: 58,000 (Note: United States sales figures for "God Is a Woman", including its first week (42,000) and second week (16,000).)	RIAA: 4× Platinum; ARIA: 5× Platinum; BPI: 2× Platinum; BVMI: Gold; FIMI: Gold; GLF: Gold; IFPI DEN: Platinum; MC: 5× Platinum; RMNZ: 3× Platinum	Sweetener
"Breathin"	2018	12	8	15	19	35	33	23	11	13	8	US: 27,800 (Note: United States first week sales figures for "Breathin".)	RIAA: 3× Platinum; ARIA: 3× Platinum; BPI: Platinum; IFPI DEN: Gold; GLF: Platinum; MC: 3× Platinum; RMNZ: 2× Platinum	Sweetener
"Thank U, Next"	2018	1	1	1	3	13	24	3	1	3	1	US: 299,000 (Note: United States sales figures for "Thank U, Next", including its first week (81,000), second week (43,000), third week (23,000), fourth week (18,000), fifth week (43,000), sixth week (25,000), seventh week (23,000), and eighth week. (43,000)); GER: 48,288 (Note: Germany sales figures for "Thank U, Next" as for December 2019.); UK: 2,190,000 (Note: United Kingdom sales figures (combined with equivalent track streams) for "Thank U, Next" as of August 2026.)	RIAA: 8× Platinum; ARIA: 10× Platinum; BPI: 3× Platinum; BVMI: Gold; FIMI: Platinum; GLF: 2× Platinum; IFPI DEN: Platinum; MC: 9× Platinum; RMNZ: 5× Platinum	Thank U, Next
"7 Rings"	2019	1	1	1	2	4	5	4	1	1	1	WW: 13,300,000 (Note: Worldwide sales figures (combined with equivalent track streams) for "7 Rings" as of December 2019.); US: 476,000 (Note: United States sales figures for "7 Rings" as of January 2020.); CAN: 57,000 (Note: Canada sales figures for "7 Rings" as of January 2020.); GER: 112,879 (Note: Germany sales figures for "7 Rings" as of December 2019.); UK: 1,970,000 (Note: United Kingdom sales figures (combined with equivalent track streams) for "7 Rings" as of January 2024.)	RIAA: Diamond; ARIA: 10× Platinum; BPI: 3× Platinum; BVMI: Platinum; FIMI: Platinum; GLF: 3× Platinum; IFPI DEN: 2× Platinum; MC: Diamond; RMNZ: 5× Platinum	Thank U, Next
"Break Up with Your Girlfriend, I'm Bored"	2019	2	2	2	4	8	35	11	1	6	1	US: 52,000 (Note: United States sales figures for "Break Up with Your Girlfriend, I'm Bored", including its first (36,000) and second (16,000) weeks.); UK: 672,875 (Note: United Kingdom sales figures for "Break Up with Your Girlfriend, I'm Bored" as of December 2019.)	RIAA: 5× Platinum; ARIA: 5× Platinum; BPI: 2x Platinum; BVMI: Gold; FIMI: Gold; GLF: Platinum; IFPI DEN: Platinum; MC: 5× Platinum; RMNZ: 3× Platinum	Thank U, Next
"Monopoly" (Note: "Monopoly" was later included on the Japanese deluxe edition of Thank U, Next.) (with Victoria Monét)	2019	69	21	38	—	98	—	76	19	53	23	US: 12,000 (Note: United States first week sales figures for "Monopoly".)	ARIA: Gold; BPI: Silver; MC: Gold; RMNZ: Gold	Non-album single
"Boyfriend" (with Social House)	2019	8	4	5	20	23	57	30	4	18	4		RIAA: Platinum; ARIA: 3× Platinum; BPI: Platinum; GLF: Gold; IFPI DEN: Gold; MC: 3× Platinum; RMNZ: 2× Platinum	Everything Changed...
"Don't Call Me Angel" (with Miley Cyrus and Lana Del Rey)	2019	13	4	7	22	11	39	27	6	25	2	US: 26,000 (Note: United States first week sales figures for "Don't Call Me Angel".); UK: 195,763 (Note: United Kingdom sales figures for "Don't Call Me Angel" as of December 2019.)	ARIA: Platinum; BPI: Gold; MC: Platinum; RMNZ: Gold	Charlie's Angels
"—" denotes a recording that did not chart or was not released in that territory.

==== 2020s ====
List of singles as lead artist released in the 2020s, showing year released, selected chart positions, certifications, and originating album
Title	Year	Peak chart positions										Certifications	Album
Title	Year	US	AUS	CAN	IRE	NOR	NZ	SWE	SWI	UK	WW	Certifications	Album
"Stuck with U" (with Justin Bieber)	2020	1	3	1	2	4	1	8	5	4	60	RIAA: 4× Platinum; ARIA: 5× Platinum; BPI: Platinum; GLF: Platinum; IFPI NOR: Platinum; MC: 4× Platinum; RMNZ: 4× Platinum	Non-album single
"Rain on Me" (with Lady Gaga)	2020	1	2	1	1	7	2	8	5	1	22	RIAA: 2× Platinum; ARIA: 5× Platinum; BPI: 3× Platinum; GLF: Platinum; IFPI NOR: 2× Platinum; MC: 6× Platinum; RMNZ: 3× Platinum	Chromatica
"Positions"	2020	1	1	1	1	7	1	10	5	1	1	RIAA: 5× Platinum; ARIA: 6× Platinum; BPI: 2× Platinum; GLF: Platinum; IFPI NOR: 2× Platinum; MC: 6× Platinum; RMNZ: 3× Platinum	Positions
"34+35" (solo or remix featuring Doja Cat and Megan Thee Stallion)	2020	2	5	5	4	26	3	34	33	3	2	RIAA: 5× Platinum; ARIA: 4× Platinum; BPI: Platinum; GLF: Gold; IFPI NOR: Platinum; MC: 5× Platinum; RMNZ: 3× Platinum	Positions
"POV"	2021	27	29	31	16	—	19	83	81	19	22	RIAA: 2× Platinum; ARIA: 2× Platinum; BPI: Gold; IFPI NOR: Gold; MC: 2× Platinum; RMNZ: Platinum	Positions
"Save Your Tears" (remix with the Weeknd)	2021	1	—	1	—	13	—	9	3	—	1	GLF: 6× Platinum; IFPI NOR: 4× Platinum; RMNZ: 5× Platinum	After Hours (Deluxe)
"Die for You" (remix with the Weeknd)	2023	1	—	2	—	6	6	2	8	—	2	RMNZ: 4× Platinum	Starboy (Deluxe)
"Yes, And?"	2024	1	2	1	2	4	3	6	1	2	1	RIAA: 2× Platinum; ARIA: 2× Platinum; BPI: Platinum; IFPI NOR: Gold; IFPI SWI: Gold; MC: 2× Platinum; RMNZ: Platinum	Eternal Sunshine
"We Can't Be Friends (Wait for Your Love)"	2024	1	2	3	3	3	1	6	7	2	1	RIAA: 4× Platinum; ARIA: 6× Platinum; BPI: 2× Platinum; GLF: Platinum; IFPI NOR: Platinum; IFPI SWI: Platinum; MC: 4× Platinum; RMNZ: 3× Platinum	Eternal Sunshine
"The Boy Is Mine"	2024	16	28	15	51	—	23	— (Note: "The Boy Is Mine" did not enter the Swedish Singellista Chart, but peaked at number one on the Swedish Heatseeker Chart.)	—	39	11	RIAA: 2× Platinum; BPI: Gold; MC: Platinum; RMNZ: Platinum	Eternal Sunshine
"Popular"	2024	53	52	77	26	—	— (Note: "Popular" did not enter the NZ Top 40 Singles Chart, but peaked at number eight on the NZ Hot Singles Chart.)	—	—	13	54	ARIA: Gold; BPI: Silver	Wicked: The Soundtrack
"Twilight Zone"	2025	18	16	23	12	49	17	60	47	5	7	ARIA: Platinum; BPI: Silver; RMNZ: Gold	Eternal Sunshine Deluxe: Brighter Days Ahead
"Hate That I Made You Love Me"	2026	1	2	2	3	6	3	8	1	1	1	RIAA: Platinum; BPI: Gold; IFPI SWI: Gold; MC: 2× Platinum; RMNZ: Platinum	Petal
"Petal"	2026	4	5	5	9	17	5	14	7	4	2		Petal
"—" denotes a recording that did not chart or was not released in that territory.

=== As featured artist ===
List of singles as featured artist, showing year released, selected chart positions, certifications, and originating album
Title	Year	Peak chart positions										Certifications	Album
Title	Year	US	AUS	CAN	FRA	ITA	JPN	NLD	NZ	SWE	UK	Certifications	Album
"Popular Song" (Mika featuring Ariana Grande)	2012	87	71	—	—	—	—	92	—	—	183	RIAA: Gold; BPI: Silver; RMNZ: Gold	The Origin of Love and Yours Truly
"Adore" (Note: "Adore" only appears on the Japanese deluxe edition of 9.) (Cashmere Cat featuring Ariana Grande)	2015	93	—	—	—	—	—	—	—	—	—		Non-album singles
"Boys Like You" (Who Is Fancy featuring Meghan Trainor and Ariana Grande)	2015	— (Note: "Boys Like You" did not enter the Billboard Hot 100, but peaked at number 18 on the Bubbling Under Hot 100 chart.)	—	—	—	—	—	89	26	—	—	RMNZ: Gold	Non-album singles
"Over and Over Again" (Nathan Sykes featuring Ariana Grande)	2016	—	—	—	—	—	—	—	—	—	—		Unfinished Business
"My Favorite Part" (Mac Miller featuring Ariana Grande)	2016	—	—	—	—	—	—	—	— (Note: "My Favorite Part" did not enter the NZ Top 40 Singles Chart, but peaked at number three on the NZ Heatseekers Singles Chart.)	—	—	RIAA: Platinum; BPI: Silver; RMNZ: Platinum	The Divine Feminine
"Faith" (Stevie Wonder featuring Ariana Grande)	2016	—	—	—	102	51	48	— (Note: "Faith" did not enter the Single Top 100, but peaked at number 18 on the Dutch Single Tip chart.)	—	—	—	BPI: Silver; FIMI: Gold	Sing
"Heatstroke" (Calvin Harris featuring Young Thug, Pharrell Williams, and Ariana Grande)	2017	96	23	53	107	71	63	— (Note: "Heatstroke" did not enter the Single Top 100, but peaked at number three on the Dutch Single Tip chart.)	— (Note: "Heatstroke" did not enter the NZ Top 40 Singles Chart, but peaked at number one on the NZ Heatseekers Singles Chart.)	64	25	RIAA: Gold; ARIA: Platinum; BPI: Silver; MC: Gold; RMNZ: Platinum	Funk Wav Bounces Vol. 1
"Quit" (Cashmere Cat featuring Ariana Grande)	2017	—	56	100	—	—	—	81	— (Note: "Quit" did not enter the NZ Top 40 Singles Chart, but peaked at number four on the NZ Heatseeker Singles Chart.)	—	— (Note: "Quit" did not enter the UK Singles Chart, but peaked at number 73 on the UK Singles Downloads Chart.)	RIAA: Gold; RMNZ: Gold	9
"Dance to This" (Troye Sivan featuring Ariana Grande)	2018	— (Note: "Dance to This" did not enter the Billboard Hot 100 Singles Chart, but peaked at number 15 on the Bubbling Under Hot 100 Chart.)	39	85	—	52	—	— (Note: "Dance to This" did not enter the Single Top 100, but peaked at number four on the Dutch Single Tip chart.)	— (Note: "Dance to This" did not enter the NZ Top 40 Singles Chart, but peaked at number one on the NZ Heatseeker Singles Chart.)	98	64	RIAA: Platinum; ARIA: 2× Platinum; BPI: Silver; MC: Platinum; RMNZ: Platinum	Bloom
"Bed" (Nicki Minaj featuring Ariana Grande)	2018	42	17	30	105	91	—	64	25	44	20	RIAA: Gold; ARIA: Platinum; BPI: Gold; MC: Platinum; RMNZ: Platinum	Queen
"Rule the World" (2 Chainz featuring Ariana Grande)	2019	94	—	93	—	—	—	—	— (Note: "Rule the World" did not enter the NZ Top 40 Singles Chart, but peaked at number 11 on the NZ Hot Singles Chart.)	—	—	RIAA: Gold	Rap or Go to the League
"Good as Hell" (Remix) (Lizzo featuring Ariana Grande)	2019	—	—	—	—	—	—	50	10	29	—	RMNZ: Platinum; SNEP: Platinum	Cuz I Love You (Super Deluxe)
"Time" (Childish Gambino featuring Ariana Grande)	2020	—	—	—	—	—	—	—	— (Note: "Time" did not enter the NZ Top 40 Singles Chart, but peaked at number 21 on the NZ Hot Singles Chart.)	—	—		3.15.20
"Met Him Last Night" (Demi Lovato featuring Ariana Grande)	2021	61	52	48	—	—	—	—	— (Note: "Met Him Last Night" did not enter the NZ Top 40 Singles Chart, but peaked at number three on the NZ Hot Singles Chart.)	— (Note: "Met Him Last Night" did not enter the Swedish Singellista Chart, but peaked at number seven on the Swedish Heatseeker Chart.)	44		Dancing with the Devil... the Art of Starting Over
"Defying Gravity" (Cynthia Erivo featuring Ariana Grande)	2024	44	31	63	—	—	—	—	— (Note: "Defying Gravity" did not enter the NZ Top 40 Singles Chart, but peaked at number six on the NZ Hot Singles Chart.)	—	7	RIAA: Platinum; BPI: Gold; RMNZ: Gold	Wicked: The Soundtrack
"—" denotes a recording that did not chart or was not released in that territory.

=== Holiday singles ===
List of holiday singles as lead or featured artist, showing year released, selected chart positions, certifications, and originating album
Title	Year	Peak chart positions										Certifications	Album
Title	Year	US	US Hol.	AUS	CAN	KOR	NLD	NZ	SWI	UK	WW	Certifications	Album
"Last Christmas"	2013	96	32	95	—	23	59	—	84	92	157	ARIA: Platinum; BPI: Silver; RMNZ: Gold	Christmas Kisses
"Love Is Everything"	2013	—	15	—	—	—	89	—	—	132	—		Christmas Kisses
"Snow in California"	2013	—	33	—	—	—	93	—	—	151	—		Christmas Kisses
"Santa Baby" (featuring Liz Gillies)	2013	—	36	77	—	—	53	—	77	155	—	ARIA: Gold; BPI: Silver; RMNZ: Gold	Christmas Kisses
"Santa Tell Me"	2014	5	1	5	6	5	3	5	5	8	5	RIAA: 4× Platinum; ARIA: 5× Platinum; BPI: 4× Platinum; GLF: 3× Platinum; IFPI SWI: Gold; MC: 6× Platinum; RMNZ: 3× Platinum	Christmas Kisses and Christmas & Chill
"A Hand for Mrs. Claus" (with Idina Menzel)	2019	—	— (Note: "A Hand for Mrs. Claus" did not enter the Billboard Holiday 100, but peaked at number three on Holiday Digital Song Sales.)	—	—	—	—	—	—	—	—		Christmas: A Season of Love
"Oh Santa!" (Mariah Carey featuring Ariana Grande and Jennifer Hudson)	2020	76	45	—	60	99	—	— (Note: "Oh Santa!" did not enter the Single Top 100, but peaked at number seven on the Dutch Single Tip chart.)	74	50	66		Mariah Carey's Magical Christmas Special
"It Was a... (Masked Christmas)" (Jimmy Fallon featuring Ariana Grande and Megan Thee Stallion)	2021	—	— (Note: "It Was a... (Masked Christmas)" did not enter the Billboard Holiday 100, but it peaked at number 37 on Holiday Digital Song Sales.)	—	—	—	—	—	—	—	—		Holiday Seasoning
"Santa, Can't You Hear Me" (with Kelly Clarkson)	2022	31	30	38	37	165	50	35	26	23	28	BPI: Gold; RMNZ: Gold	When Christmas Comes Around...
"—" denotes a recording that did not chart or was not released in that territory.

=== Promotional singles ===
List of promotional singles, showing year released, selected chart positions, certifications, and originating album
Title	Year	Peak chart positions										Certifications	Album
Title	Year	US	AUS	CAN	DEN	FRA	IRE	JPN	NLD	NZ	UK	Certifications	Album
"Put Your Hearts Up"	2011	—	—	—	—	—	—	—	—	—	—	RIAA: Gold	Non-album promotional single
"L.A. Boyz" (Note: Sources stating that "L.A. Boyz" is a promotional single: Bop and Tiger Beat, M Magazine, and RyanSeacrest.com) (Victorious cast featuring Victoria Justice and Ariana Grande)	2012	—	—	—	—	—	—	—	—	—	—		Victorious 3.0: Even More Music from the Hit TV Show
"Almost Is Never Enough" (with Nathan Sykes)	2013	82	—	—	—	—	—	—	—	—	49	RIAA: Platinum; ARIA: Platinum; BPI: Silver; RMNZ: Platinum	The Mortal Instruments: City of Bones and Yours Truly
"Best Mistake" (featuring Big Sean)	2014	49	45	39	29	103	99	74	67	29	154	RIAA: Platinum; ARIA: Gold; BPI: Silver; RMNZ: Gold	My Everything
"Brand New You" (featuring Brynn Williams and Caitlin Gann)	2014	—	—	—	—	—	—	—	—	—	—		13 (Original Broadway Cast Recording)
"This Is Not a Feminist Song" (Saturday Night Live cast featuring Ariana Grande)	2016	—	—	—	—	—	—	—	—	—	—		Non-album promotional single
"Be Alright"	2016	43	52	39	—	75	92	67	89	— (Note: "Be Alright" did not enter the NZ Top 40 Singles Chart, but peaked at number eight on the NZ Heatseekers chart.)	65	RIAA: Platinum; ARIA: Platinum; BPI: Gold; RMNZ: Gold	Dangerous Woman
"Let Me Love You" (featuring Lil Wayne)	2016	99	88	73	—	164	—	—	— (Note: "Let Me Love You" did not enter the Single Top 100, but peaked at number six on the Dutch Single Tip chart.)	—	180	RIAA: 2× Platinum; ARIA: 2× Platinum; IFPI DEN: Gold; BPI: Gold; RMNZ: Platinum	Dangerous Woman
"Jason's Song (Gave It Away)"	2016	—	—	—	—	—	—	—	—	—	—		Dangerous Woman
"Somewhere Over the Rainbow" (Note: The live rendition of "Somewhere Over the Rainbow" from Grande's benefit concert One Love Manchester was released digitally on June 6, 2017, as a charity single for the We Love Manchester Emergency Fund.)	2017	—	—	—	—	—	—	—	—	—	60		Non-album promotional single
"Arturo Sandoval" (Arturo Sandoval and Pharrell Williams featuring Ariana Grande)	2018	—	—	—	—	—	—	—	—	—	—		Ultimate Duets
"The Light Is Coming" (featuring Nicki Minaj)	2018	89	60	63	—	—	76	— (Note: "The Light Is Coming" did not enter the Japan Hot 100, but peaked at number 12 on the Japan Hot Overseas Chart.)	81	— (Note: "The Light Is Coming" did not enter the NZ Top 40 Singles Chart, but peaked at number two on the NZ Heatseeker Singles Chart.)	57	ARIA: 2× Platinum; BPI: Silver	Sweetener
"Imagine"	2018	21	15	17	—	110	4	— (Note: "Imagine" did not enter the Japan Hot 100, but peaked at number 17 on the Japan Hot Overseas Chart.)	32	16	8	RIAA: 2× Platinum; ARIA: Platinum; BPI: Gold; RMNZ: Platinum	Thank U, Next
"Just Look Up" (with Kid Cudi)	2021	—	—	—	—	—	—	—	—	— (Note: "Just Look Up" did not enter the NZ Top 40 Singles Chart, but peaked at number seven on the NZ Hot Singles Chart.)	—		Don't Look Up
"I Don't Know Why (I Just Do)" (Jeff Goldblum & The Mildred Snitzer Orchestra featuring Ariana Grande)	2025	—	—	—	—	—	—	—	—	—	—		Still Blooming
"Supernatural"	2025	17	18	27	—	74	—	—	—	24	— (Note: "Supernatural" did not enter the UK Singles Chart, but peaked at number 20 on the UK Streaming Chart.)	RIAA: Platinum; ARIA: Platinum; BPI: Silver; MC: Gold; RMNZ: Gold	Eternal Sunshine
"Hampstead"	2025	59	65	55	—	—	—	—	—	— (Note: "Hampstead" did not enter the NZ Top 40 Singles Chart, but peaked at number four on the NZ Hot Singles Chart.)	— (Note: "Hampstead" did not enter the UK Singles Chart, but peaked at number 46 on the UK Streaming Chart.)		Eternal Sunshine Deluxe: Brighter Days Ahead
"Dandelion"	2025	38	45	45	—	180	—	—	—	38	19		Eternal Sunshine Deluxe: Brighter Days Ahead
"For Good" (with Cynthia Erivo)	2025	43	62	49	—	—	21	—	—	— (Note: "For Good" did not enter the NZ Top 40 Singles Chart, but peaked at number five on the NZ Hot Singles Chart.)	14		Wicked: For Good – The Soundtrack
"A Wicked Good Finale" (John Powell and Stephen Schwartz featuring Ariana Grande and Cynthia Erivo)	2025	—	—	—	—	—	—	—	—	—	—		Wicked: For Good (Original Motion Picture Score)
"The Girl in the Bubble"	2026	100	—	—	—	—	—	—	—	— (Note: "The Girl in the Bubble" did not enter the NZ Top 40 Singles Chart, but peaked at number 11 on the NZ Hot Singles Chart.)	— (Note: "The Girl in the Bubble" did not enter the UK Singles Chart, but peaked at number 12 on the UK Singles Sales Chart.)		Wicked: For Good – The Soundtrack
"—" denotes a recording that did not chart or was not released in that territory.

== Other charted and certified songs ==
=== 2010s ===
List of other charted songs released in the 2010s, showing year released, selected chart positions, certifications, and originating album
Title	Year	Peak chart positions										Certifications	Album
Title	Year	US	AUS	CAN	FRA	KOR Int.	NLD	NZ	POR	SWE	UK	Certifications	Album
"Give It Up" (Victorious cast featuring Elizabeth Gillies and Ariana Grande)	2011	— (Note: "Give It Up" did not enter the Billboard Hot 100, but peaked at number 23 on the Bubbling Under Hot 100 chart.)	—	—	—	—	—	—	—	—	—		Victorious
"Honeymoon Avenue"	2013	— (Note: "Honeymoon Avenue" did not enter the Billboard Hot 100, but peaked at number 24 on the Bubbling Under Hot 100 chart.)	—	—	—	—	—	—	—	—	—	ARIA: Gold; RMNZ: Gold	Yours Truly
"Tattooed Heart"	2013	— (Note: "Tattooed Heart" did not enter the Billboard Hot 100, but peaked at number 15 on the Bubbling Under Hot 100 chart.)	—	—	—	—	—	—	—	—	—	RMNZ: Gold	Yours Truly
"Daydreamin'"	2013	—	—	—	—	12	—	—	—	—	—		Yours Truly
"You'll Never Know"	2013	—	—	—	—	42	—	—	—	—	—		Yours Truly
"Break Your Heart Right Back" (featuring Childish Gambino)	2014	— (Note: "Break Your Heart Right Back" did not enter the Billboard Hot 100, but peaked at number 12 on the Bubbling Under Hot 100 chart.)	—	—	—	—	—	—	—	—	—		My Everything
"Just a Little Bit of Your Heart"	2014	— (Note: "Just a Little Bit of Your Heart" did not enter the Billboard Hot 100, but peaked at number 13 on the Bubbling Under Hot 100 chart.)	99	—	—	—	—	—	—	—	177	ARIA: Gold; MC: Gold	My Everything
"My Everything"	2014	— (Note: "My Everything" did not enter the Billboard Hot 100, but peaked at number 11 on the Bubbling Under Hot 100 chart.)	—	—	—	73	—	—	—	—	— (Note: "My Everything" did not enter the UK Singles Chart, but peaked at number 42 on the UK Singles Downloads Chart.)		My Everything
"All My Love" (Major Lazer featuring Ariana Grande)	2014	—	—	87	135	—	—	—	—	—	194		The Hunger Games: Mockingjay – Part 1
"Get on Your Knees" (Nicki Minaj featuring Ariana Grande)	2014	88	80	98	181	90	—	—	—	—	86		The Pinkprint
"Wit It This Christmas"	2015	—	—	—	—	—	— (Note: "Wit It This Christmas" did not enter the Single Top 100, but peaked at number 25 on the Dutch Single Tip chart.)	—	—	—	—		Christmas & Chill
"December"	2015	—	—	—	—	—	— (Note: "December" did not enter the Single Top 100, but peaked at number 12 on the Dutch Single Tip chart.)	— (Note: "December" did not enter the NZ Top 40 Singles Chart, but peaked at number 12 on the NZ Hot Singles Chart.)	—	—	—		Christmas & Chill
"True Love"	2015	—	—	—	—	30	—	—	—	—	—		Christmas & Chill
"Winter Things"	2015	—	—	—	—	—	40	—	—	—	—		Christmas & Chill
"Moonlight"	2016	—	—	—	—	—	—	—	—	—	—	RIAA: Gold; ARIA: Gold; BPI: Silver; RMNZ: Gold	Dangerous Woman
"Greedy"	2016	—	—	—	194	18	—	—	86	—	113	RIAA: Platinum; ARIA: Platinum; BPI: Silver; RMNZ: Gold	Dangerous Woman
"Leave Me Lonely" (featuring Macy Gray)	2016	—	—	—	—	—	—	—	—	—	143	RIAA: Gold	Dangerous Woman
"Bad Decisions"	2016	—	—	—	—	—	—	—	—	—	180	RIAA: Gold	Dangerous Woman
"Touch It"	2016	—	—	—	—	—	—	—	—	—	176	RIAA: Gold; ARIA: Gold; BPI: Silver; RMNZ: Gold	Dangerous Woman
"Knew Better / Forever Boy"	2016	—	—	—	—	—	—	—	—	—	—	RIAA: Gold	Dangerous Woman
"Thinking Bout You"	2016	—	—	—	—	—	—	—	—	—	183	RIAA: Gold; ARIA: Gold	Dangerous Woman
"They Don't Know"	2016	—	—	—	—	—	—	—	—	—	—	BPI: Silver	Trolls: Original Motion Picture Soundtrack
"Raindrops (An Angel Cried)"	2018	— (Note: "Raindrops (An Angel Cried)" did not enter the Billboard Hot 100, but peaked at number six on the Bubbling Under Hot 100 chart.)	65	96	—	—	—	—	54	— (Note: "Raindrops (An Angel Cried)" did not enter the Sverigetopplistan Singellista, but peaked at number 10 on the Sverigetopplistan Heatseeker chart.)	—		Sweetener
"Blazed" (featuring Pharrell Williams)	2018	— (Note: "Blazed" did not enter the Billboard Hot 100, but peaked at number 14 on the Bubbling Under Hot 100 chart.)	74	—	—	—	—	—	80	—	—		Sweetener
"R.E.M"	2018	72	52	68	—	—	100	—	67	— (Note: "R.E.M" did not enter the Sverigetopplistan Top 100 Singles chart, but peaked at number 16 on the Sverigetopplistan Heatseeker chart.)	— (Note: "R.E.M" did not enter the UK Singles Chart, but peaked at number 89 on the UK Singles Downloads Chart.)	ARIA: Gold; BPI: Silver; RMNZ: Gold	Sweetener
"Sweetener"	2018	55	43	44	183	—	77	40	57	96	22	RIAA: Platinum; ARIA: Platinum; BPI: Silver; MC: Platinum; RMNZ: Gold	Sweetener
"Successful"	2018	— (Note: "Successful" did not enter the Billboard Hot 100, but peaked at number 10 on the Bubbling Under Hot 100 chart.)	71	—	—	—	—	—	99	—	—	ARIA: Gold; BPI: Silver	Sweetener
"Everytime"	2018	62	36	51	—	—	—	— (Note: "Everytime" did not enter the NZ Top 40 Singles Chart, but peaked at number four on the NZ Hot Singles Chart.)	38	— (Note: "Everytime" did not enter the Sverigetopplistan Top 100 Singles chart, but peaked at number two on the Sverigetopplistan Heatseeker chart.)	— (Note: "Everytime" did not enter the UK Singles Chart, but peaked at number 75 on the UK Singles Downloads Chart.)	RIAA: Platinum; ARIA: Platinum; BPI: Silver; RMNZ: Gold	Sweetener
"Borderline" (featuring Missy Elliott)	2018	— (Note: "Borderline" did not enter the Billboard Hot 100, but peaked at number 23 on the Bubbling Under Hot 100 chart.)	83	—	—	—	—	—	—	—	—		Sweetener
"Better Off"	2018	— (Note: "Better Off" did not enter the Billboard Hot 100, but peaked at number seven on the Bubbling Under Hot 100 chart.)	68	92	—	—	—	—	93	—	—	ARIA: Gold; RMNZ: Gold	Sweetener
"Goodnight n Go"	2018	87	57	67	—	—	—	—	76	—	— (Note: "Goodnight n Go" did not enter the UK Singles Chart, but peaked at number 68 on the UK Singles Downloads Chart.)	RIAA: Gold; ARIA: Platinum; BPI: Silver; RMNZ: Gold	Sweetener
"Pete Davidson"	2018	99	58	73	—	—	—	—	87	—	—	ARIA: Gold	Sweetener
"Get Well Soon"	2018	— (Note: "Get Well Soon" did not enter the Billboard Hot 100, but peaked at number 16 on the Bubbling Under Hot 100 chart.)	79	—	—	—	—	—	—	—	—		Sweetener
"Needy"	2019	14	13	16	100	—	41	11	16	43	8	RIAA: 2× Platinum; ARIA: Platinum; BPI: Gold; RMNZ: Platinum; SNEP: Gold	Thank U, Next
"NASA"	2019	17	16	17	128	—	46	30	26	51	— (Note: "NASA" did not enter the UK Singles Chart, but peaked at number 55 on the UK Singles Downloads Chart.)	RIAA: Platinum; ARIA: Platinum; BPI: Silver; RMNZ: Gold	Thank U, Next
"Bloodline"	2019	22	11	18	97	—	36	28	18	24	— (Note: "Bloodline" did not enter the UK Singles Chart, but peaked at number 28 on the UK Singles Downloads Chart.)	RIAA: Platinum; ARIA: Platinum; BPI: Gold; RMNZ: Platinum	Thank U, Next
"Fake Smile"	2019	26	22	25	125	—	48	—	31	54	— (Note: "Fake Smile" did not enter the UK Singles Chart, but peaked at number 47 on the UK Singles Downloads Chart.)	RIAA: Platinum; ARIA: Platinum; BPI: Silver; RMNZ: Gold	Thank U, Next
"Bad Idea"	2019	27	21	22	105	—	43	—	22	41	— (Note: "Bad Idea" did not enter the UK Singles Chart, but peaked at number 54 on the UK Singles Downloads Chart.)	RIAA: Platinum; ARIA: Platinum; BPI: Silver; RMNZ: Gold	Thank U, Next
"Make Up"	2019	48	41	42	186	—	64	—	50	— (Note: "Make Up" did not enter the Swedish Singellista Chart, but peaked at number two on the Swedish Heatseeker Chart.)	—	ARIA: Gold	Thank U, Next
"Ghostin"	2019	25	26	27	151	—	58	—	36	68	— (Note: "Ghostin" did not enter the UK Singles Chart, but peaked at number 44 on the UK Singles Downloads Chart.)	RIAA: Platinum; ARIA: Platinum; BPI: Silver; RMNZ: Gold	Thank U, Next
"In My Head"	2019	38	36	34	—	—	68	—	48	— (Note: "In My Head" did not enter the Swedish Singellista Chart, but peaked at number one on the Swedish Heatseeker Chart.)	— (Note: "In My Head" did not enter the UK Singles Chart, but peaked at number 80 on the UK Singles Downloads Chart.)	ARIA: Gold; BPI: Silver; RMNZ: Gold	Thank U, Next
"Bad to You" (with Normani and Nicki Minaj)	2019	— (Note: "Bad to You" did not enter the Billboard Hot 100, but peaked at number four on the Bubbling Under Hot 100 chart.)	63	82	—	—	—	— (Note: "Bad to You" did not enter the NZ Top 40 Singles Chart, but peaked at number four on the NZ Hot Singles Chart.)	—	77	51		Charlie's Angels
"Nobody" (with Chaka Khan)	2019	—	—	—	—	—	—	—	—	—	— (Note: "Nobody" did not enter the UK Singles Chart, but peaked at number 87 on the UK Singles Downloads Chart.)		Charlie's Angels
"How I Look on You"	2019	—	—	—	—	—	—	— (Note: "How I Look on You" did not enter the NZ Top 40 Singles Chart, but peaked at number 29 on the NZ Hot Singles Chart.)	—	—	— (Note: "How I Look on You" did not enter the UK Singles Chart, but peaked at number 64 on the UK Singles Downloads Chart.)		Charlie's Angels
"Got Her Own" (with Victoria Monét)	2019	—	—	—	—	—	—	— (Note: "Got Her Own" did not enter the NZ Top 40 Singles Chart, but peaked at number 34 on the NZ Hot Singles Chart.)	—	—	— (Note: "Got Her Own" did not enter the UK Singles Chart, but peaked at number 77 on the UK Singles Downloads Chart.)		Charlie's Angels
"—" denotes a recording that did not chart or was not released in that territory.

=== 2020s ===
List of other charted songs released in the 2020s, showing year released, selected chart positions, certifications, and originating album
Title	Year	Peak chart positions										Certifications	Album
Title	Year	US	AUS	CAN	FRA	NLD	NZ	POR	SWE	UK	WW	Certifications	Album
"Shut Up"	2020	47	45	41	193	—	—	63	—	—	28		Positions
"Motive" (with Doja Cat)	2020	32	19	25	128	—	29	28	84	16	16	RIAA: Platinum; ARIA: 2× Platinum; BPI: Gold; RMNZ: Platinum; SNEP: Gold	Positions
"Just Like Magic"	2020	43	40	37	—	—	—	60	—	—	26	RIAA: Platinum; ARIA: Gold; BPI: Silver; RMNZ: Gold	Positions
"Off the Table" (with the Weeknd)	2020	35	32	27	164	93	— (Note: "Off the Table" did not enter the NZ Top 40 Singles Chart, but peaked at number four on the NZ Hot Singles Chart.)	43	— (Note: "Off the Table" did not enter the Swedish Singellista Chart, but peaked at number 16 on the Swedish Heatseeker Chart.)	— (Note: "Off the Table" did not enter the UK Singles Chart, but peaked at number 87 on the UK Singles Downloads Chart.)	18	ARIA: Gold	Positions
"Six Thirty"	2020	63	—	51	—	—	—	88	—	—	45		Positions
"Safety Net" (featuring Ty Dolla Sign)	2020	52	42	40	—	—	—	61	—	— (Note: "Safety Net" did not enter the UK Singles Chart, but peaked at number 96 on the UK Singles Downloads Chart.)	33	RIAA: Platinum; ARIA: Gold; BPI: Silver; RMNZ: Gold	Positions
"My Hair"	2020	65	52	52	—	—	—	81	—	—	44		Positions
"Nasty"	2020	49	51	46	—	—	— (Note: "Nasty" did not enter the NZ Top 40 Singles Chart, but peaked at number 25 on the NZ Hot Singles Chart.)	75	—	—	36	RIAA: Platinum; ARIA: Gold; RMNZ: Gold	Positions
"West Side"	2020	71	—	59	—	—	—	—	—	—	64		Positions
"Love Language"	2020	75	—	62	—	—	—	—	—	—	67		Positions
"Obvious"	2020	70	—	56	—	—	—	—	—	—	56		Positions
"Someone like U"	2021	— (Note: "Someone like U" did not enter the US Billboard Hot 100 but did peak at number 43 on the Digital Song Sales chart.)	—	—	—	—	— (Note: "Someone like U" did not enter the NZ Top 40 Singles Chart, but peaked at number 31 on the NZ Hot Singles Chart.)	—	—	— (Note: "Someone like U" did not enter the UK Singles Chart, but peaked at number 50 on the UK Singles Downloads Chart.)	—		Positions (Deluxe)
"Test Drive"	2021	61	75	41	—	—	— (Note: "Test Drive" did not enter the NZ Top 40 Singles Chart, but peaked at number one on the NZ Hot Singles Chart.)	83	— (Note: "Test Drive" did not enter the Swedish Singellista Chart, but peaked at number 10 on the Swedish Heatseeker Chart.)	38	35		Positions (Deluxe)
"Worst Behavior"	2021	— (Note: "Worst Behavior" did not enter the Billboard Hot 100, but peaked at number 16 on the Bubbling Under Hot 100 chart.)	—	—	—	—	— (Note: "Worst Behavior" did not enter the NZ Top 40 Singles Chart, but peaked at number 14 on the NZ Hot Singles Chart.)	—	—	— (Note: "Someone like U" did not enter the UK Singles Chart, but peaked at number 34 on the UK Singles Downloads Chart.)	—		Positions (Deluxe)
"Main Thing"	2021	— (Note: "Main Thing" did not enter the Billboard Hot 100, but peaked at number 19 on the Bubbling Under Hot 100 chart.)	—	—	—	—	— (Note: "Main Thing" did not enter the NZ Top 40 Singles Chart, but peaked at number 17 on the NZ Hot Singles Chart.)	—	—	— (Note: "Main Thing" did not enter the UK Singles Chart, but peaked at number 42 on the UK Singles Downloads Chart.)	—		Positions (Deluxe)
"I Don't Do Drugs" (Doja Cat featuring Ariana Grande)	2021	57	43	37	—	—	31	—	—	— (Note: "I Don't Do Drugs" did not enter the UK Singles Chart, but peaked at number 78 on the UK Singles Downloads Chart.)	44	RIAA: Gold; RMNZ: Gold	Planet Her
"Honeymoon Avenue" (live from London)	2023	—	—	—	—	—	— (Note: "Honeymoon Avenue" (live from London) did not enter the NZ Top 40 Singles Chart, but peaked at number 28 on the NZ Hot Singles Chart.)	—	—	—	—		Yours Truly (Tenth Anniversary Edition)
"The Way" (live from London; featuring Mac Miller)	2023	—	—	—	—	—	— (Note: "The Way" (live from London) did not enter the NZ Top 40 Singles Chart, but peaked at number 27 on the NZ Hot Singles Chart.)	—	—	—	—		Yours Truly (Tenth Anniversary Edition)
"Intro (End of the World)"	2024	38	71	37	101	—	21	55	—	26	19	RIAA: Platinum; ARIA: Platinum; BPI: Silver; MC: Platinum; RMNZ: Platinum	Eternal Sunshine
"Bye"	2024	25	19	21	59	41	20	24	— (Note: "Bye" did not enter the Swedish Singellista Chart, but peaked at number five on the Swedish Heatseeker Chart.)	13	12	RIAA: Platinum; ARIA: Platinum; BPI: Silver; MC: Gold; RMNZ: Gold	Eternal Sunshine
"Don't Wanna Break Up Again"	2024	28	69	29	83	—	30	38	— (Note: "Don't Wanna Break Up Again" did not enter the Swedish Singellista Chart, but peaked at number 15 on the Swedish Heatseeker Chart.)	— (Note: "Don't Wanna Break Up Again" did not enter the UK Singles Chart, but peaked at number 29 on the UK Streaming Chart.)	17	ARIA: Gold	Eternal Sunshine
"Saturn Returns Interlude"	2024	—	71	—	174	—	—	88	—	— (Note: "Saturn Returns Interlude" did not enter the UK Singles Chart, but peaked at number 78 on the UK Streaming Chart.)	—		Eternal Sunshine
"Eternal Sunshine"	2024	23	22	23	75	—	25	35	— (Note: "Eternal Sunshine" did not enter the Swedish Singellista Chart, but peaked at number 13 on the Swedish Heatseeker Chart.)	— (Note: "Eternal Sunshine" did not enter the UK Singles Chart, but peaked at number 25 on the UK Streaming Chart.)	13	RIAA: Platinum; ARIA: Gold; BPI: Silver; MC: Gold; RMNZ: Gold	Eternal Sunshine
"True Story"	2024	30	39	30	62	—	38	32	— (Note: "True Story" did not enter the Swedish Singellista Chart, but peaked at number 14 on the Swedish Heatseeker Chart.)	— (Note: "True Story" did not enter the UK Singles Chart, but peaked at number 30 on the UK Streaming Chart.)	18		Eternal Sunshine
"I Wish I Hated You"	2024	39	46	40	134	—	—	63	—	— (Note: "I Wish I Hated You" did not enter the UK Singles Chart, but peaked at number 38 on the UK Streaming Chart.)	29	ARIA: Gold	Eternal Sunshine
"Imperfect for You"	2024	37	80	35	131	—	—	57	—	— (Note: "Imperfect for You" did not enter the UK Singles Chart, but peaked at number 32 on the UK Streaming Chart.)	25	ARIA: Gold	Eternal Sunshine
"Ordinary Things" (featuring Nonna)	2024	55	72	56	199	—	—	101	—	— (Note: "Ordinary Things" did not enter the UK Singles Chart, but peaked at number 77 on the UK Streaming Chart.)	47		Eternal Sunshine
"Sympathy Is a Knife" (Charli XCX featuring Ariana Grande)	2024	36	—	37	173	95	— (Note: "Sympathy Is a Knife" did not enter the NZ Top 40 Singles Chart, but peaked at number one on the NZ Hot Singles Chart.)	41	61	7	20	BPI: Gold	Brat and It's Completely Different but Also Still Brat
"No One Mourns the Wicked" (featuring Andy Nyman, Courtney-Mae Briggs, Jeff Goldblum, Sharon D. Clarke and Jenna Boyd)	2024	86	—	—	—	—	—	—	—	— (Note: "No One Mourns the Wicked" did not enter the UK Singles Chart, but peaked at number 100 on the UK Streaming Chart.)	—		Wicked: The Soundtrack
"Dear Old Shiz" (Shiz University Choir featuring Ariana Grande)	2024	— (Note: "Dear Old Shiz" did not enter the Billboard Hot 100, but peaked at number 17 on the Bubbling Under Hot 100 chart.)	—	—	—	—	—	—	—	—	—		Wicked: The Soundtrack
"What Is This Feeling?" (with Cynthia Erivo)	2024	62	58	87	—	—	— (Note: "What Is This Feeling?" did not enter the NZ Top 40 Singles Chart, but peaked at number nine on the NZ Hot Singles Chart.)	—	—	16	83	ARIA: Gold; BPI: Silver	Wicked: The Soundtrack
"Dancing Through Life" (Jonathan Bailey featuring Ariana Grande, Ethan Slater, Marissa Bode and Cynthia Erivo)	2024	86	—	—	—	—	— (Note: "Dancing Through Life" did not enter the NZ Top 40 Singles Chart, but peaked at number 12 on the NZ Hot Singles Chart.)	—	—	— (Note: "Dancing Through Life" did not enter the UK Singles Chart, but peaked at number 86 on the UK Streaming Chart.)	—		Wicked: The Soundtrack
"One Short Day" (with Cynthia Erivo, Kristin Chenoweth and Idina Menzel featuring Michael McCorry Rose)	2024	— (Note: "One Short Day" did not enter the Billboard Hot 100, but peaked at number 14 on the Bubbling Under Hot 100 chart.)	—	—	—	—	—	—	—	—	—		Wicked: The Soundtrack
"Warm"	2025	54	58	53	—	—	— (Note: "Warm" did not enter the NZ Top 40 Singles Chart, but peaked at number three on the NZ Hot Singles Chart.)	104	—	— (Note: "Warm" did not enter the UK Singles Chart, but peaked at number 63 on the UK Streaming Chart.)	37		Eternal Sunshine Deluxe: Brighter Days Ahead
"Past Life"	2025	53	71	57	—	—	—	112	—	— (Note: "Past Life" did not enter the UK Singles Chart, but peaked at number 66 on the UK Streaming Chart.)	41		Eternal Sunshine Deluxe: Brighter Days Ahead
"For Good" (Live from the Gershwin Theatre) (with Cynthia Erivo, Idina Menzel and Kristin Chenoweth)	2025	—	—	—	—	—	— (Note: "For Good (Live from the Gershwin Theatre)" did not enter the NZ Top 40 Singles Chart, but peaked at number 37 on the NZ Hot Singles Chart.)	—	—	—	—		Wicked: One Wonderful Night
"Every Day More Wicked" (Wicked Movie Cast and Cynthia Erivo featuring Michelle Yeoh and Ariana Grande)	2025	— (Note: "Every Day More Wicked" did not enter the Billboard Hot 100, but peaked at number 15 on the Bubbling Under Hot 100 chart.)	—	—	—	—	—	—	—	—	—		Wicked: For Good – The Soundtrack
"Thank Goodness / I Couldn't Be Happier" (with Wicked Movie Cast featuring Michelle Yeoh)	2025	— (Note: "Thank Goodness / I Couldn't Be Happier" did not enter the Billboard Hot 100, but peaked at number 4 on the Bubbling Under Hot 100 chart.)	—	—	—	—	—	—	—	—	—		Wicked: For Good – The Soundtrack
"Wonderful" (with Jeff Goldblum and Cynthia Erivo)	2025	— (Note: "Wonderful" did not enter the Billboard Hot 100, but peaked at number 18 on the Bubbling Under Hot 100 chart.)	—	—	—	—	—	—	—	—	—		Wicked: For Good – The Soundtrack
"Kiss Me"	2026	21	12	21	—	52	11	—	— (Note: "Kiss Me" did not enter the Swedish Singellista Chart, but peaked at number 1 on the Swedish Heatseeker Chart.)	15	5		Petal
"Stay"	2026	22	20	22	—	—	19	—	— (Note: "Stay" did not enter the Swedish Singellista Chart, but peaked at number 7 on the Swedish Heatseeker Chart.)	—	7		Petal
"Oh Well"	2026	23	19	26	—	—	20	—	— (Note: "Oh Well" did not enter the Swedish Singellista Chart, but peaked at number 2 on the Swedish Heatseeker Chart.)	—	8		Petal
"Big Feelings"	2026	27	35	29	—	—	27	—	— (Note: "Big Feelings" did not enter the Swedish Singellista Chart, but peaked at number 13 on the Swedish Heatseeker Chart.)	—	18		Petal
"Freak"	2026	32	39	32	—	—	36	—	— (Note: "Freak" did not enter the Swedish Singellista Chart, but peaked at number 20 on the Swedish Heatseeker Chart.)	—	23		Petal
"Warning Signs" (Interlude)	2026	38	47	40	—	—	—	—	—	—	38		Petal
"Like I Do"	2026	24	22	25	—	—	24	—	— (Note: "Like I Do" did not enter the Swedish Singellista Chart, but peaked at number 9 on the Swedish Heatseeker Chart.)	48	11		Petal
"Never Get Over Me"	2026	33	40	31	—	—	35	—	— (Note: "Never Get Over Me" did not enter the Swedish Singellista Chart, but peaked at number 19 on the Swedish Heatseeker Chart.)	—	24		Petal
"Bad Thing (Bunny Hop)"	2026	36	43	37	—	—	—	—	—	—	30		Petal
"Nowhere, Nobody"	2026	39	48	39	—	—	—	—	—	—	36		Petal
"—" denotes a recording that did not chart or was not released in that territory.

== Footnotes ==
Notes for albums and songs

Notes for peak chart positions

== See also ==
- Ariana Grande videography
- List of songs recorded by Ariana Grande
