= Ariana Grande videography =

Videos and media by American singer

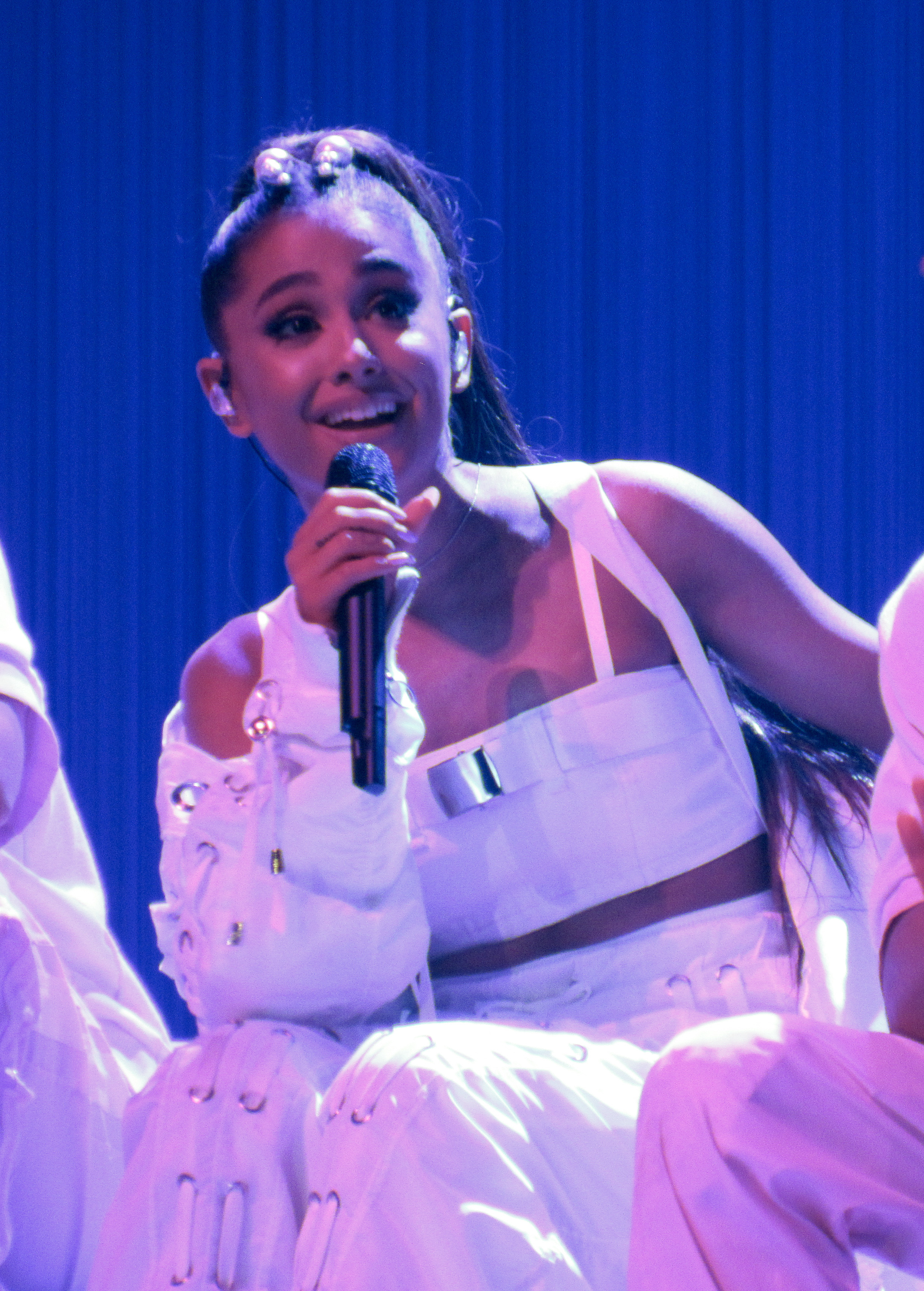
Grande during her Dangerous Woman Tour in 2017

The American singer, songwriter, and actress Ariana Grande has appeared in various visual media. She has starred in 61 music videos and acted in numerous films and television shows. She began her career at age 15 by appearing in the Broadway musical 13 (2008) and rose to fame as Cat Valentine in the Nickelodeon television series Victorious (2010–2013) and its spin-off series, Sam & Cat (2013–2014). In 2013, Grande launched her music career with her debut studio album, Yours Truly (2013), and released music videos for the singles "The Way", "Baby I", and "Right There". From 2014 to 2015, music videos for "Problem", "Break Free", "Bang Bang", "Love Me Harder", and "One Last Time" were released—singles from her second studio album, My Everything (2014).

Grande's third studio album, Dangerous Woman (2016), spawned videos for the eponymous lead single, "Into You", "Side to Side", and "Everyday". Her fourth studio album, Sweetener (2018), was preceded by the singles "No Tears Left to Cry" and "God Is a Woman", whose music videos were directed by Dave Meyers, and followed by "Breathin". Her album Thank U, Next produced the music video of the same name and the 2019 music videos for "7 Rings" and "Break Up with Your Girlfriend, I'm Bored", all of which were directed by Hannah Lux Davis. At the 2019 MTV Video Music Awards, Grande received twelve nominations and won three awards including the MTV Video Music Award for Artist of the Year. At the 2020 MTV Video Music Awards, she received nine nominations, winning four awards including three for "Rain on Me" with Lady Gaga. Grande released three music videos for her sixth studio album, Positions (2020)—"Positions", "34+35", and "34+35 (Remix)". Grande's seventh studio album, Eternal Sunshine (2024), was supported by four music videos—"Yes, And?", "We Can't Be Friends (Wait for Your Love)", "The Boy Is Mine", and "Supernatural"—all for which she enlisted Christian Breslauer to direct.

Grande has increasingly incorporated cinematic elements into her music videos, often drawing inspiration from classic films. She frequently pays homage to films through recreations of scenes, character portrayals, and overall aesthetic choices. The "Thank U, Next" music video is a direct homage to several teen rom-coms, including Mean Girls, Legally Blonde, 13 Going on 30, and Bring It On. Grande recreated iconic scenes, outfits, and got cameos from some of the original movie stars. The movies' "burn book", is used in the video, to fill positive affirmations about her exes and includes references to iconic teen movies. Grande's album Eternal Sunshine is heavily inspired by the film Eternal Sunshine of the Spotless Mind. In the "We Can't Be Friends" video, Grande plays a character named Peaches, a nod to the film's lead, Clementine, and featuring a memory-erasure clinic. The short film Brighter Days Ahead, which continued the narrative, featured detailed references to the film's plot and characters, and incorporated elements from the movie, including a memory-recovery machine reminiscent of Cerebro from X-Men. Inspired by the Austin Powers movies (specifically the Fembots), with having the bra missile in "Break Free", referencing upgrading the bra pistols to a more powerful weapon, while Grande and her dancers embodying their robotic aesthetic in "34+35". In addition, Grande has mentioned other movies as influences on her work, including Metropolis, Barbarella, Star Wars Episode IV: A New Hope, Star Trek, Sixteen Candles, and Batman Returns. Grande is also known for her visually striking music videos, that often delve into personal experiences and emotions, creating a connection with her audience. She uses "easter eggs" in her music videos, filled with nods to her personal life, past relationships, and cinematic inspirations, which her fans actively seek out and discuss, searching for hidden clues and references, often discussing them on social media. Grande's use of easter eggs helped her to build intricate narratives and provide deeper meaning for her fans.

Grande has over forty music videos surpassing 100 million views, while seven have over a billion views on YouTube. On November 30, 2018, Grande released the music video for her single "Thank U, Next". Directed by Hannah Lux Davis, the video broke the record for most-watched music video in YouTube within 24 hours, officially achieving 55.4 million views on the platform in its first day. It also became the fastest Vevo video to reach 100 million views on YouTube, in three days and ten hours. Her YouTube channel is one of the most viewed music channels on the platform, having attracted nearly 30 billion views. With over 56.3 million subscribers, she is the third-most-subscribed female artist and held the record for female musician with the most subscribers for six years. Grande has won 15 MTV Video Music Awards for her music videos so far, receiving Artist of the Year in 2019 and Video of the Year in 2025, respectively. She is the fifth most nominated artist of all time—with 65 nominations overall—including six for Video of the Year and a record six for Artist of the Year.

Grande's subsequent television work included a recurring role in the first season of the Fox series Scream Queens (2015), Penny Pingleton in NBC's live musical television special Hairspray Live! (2016), and a guest appearance in the Showtime series Kidding (2020). Grande has hosted and performed on Saturday Night Live in 2016, 2024, and 2025, showcasing her comedic and hosting talents. She served as a coach on The Voice in 2021 and has been a guest judge on RuPaul's Drag Race in 2015 and 2023. Grande was the focus of documentary films/specials: Dangerous Woman Diaries (2018), a four-part YouTube Originals docuseries that offered behind-the-scenes access during her Dangerous Woman Tour and the creation of her Sweetener album; and Excuse Me, I Love You (2020), a Netflix concert film documenting her Sweetener World Tour.

She appeared in Adam McKay's film Don't Look Up (2021). With streams of more than 152 million hours in a week, it broke the record for the biggest viewership week in Netflix history, at the time. Grande starred as Galinda Upland in Wicked (2024). A critical and commercial success, it was listed amongst the best musical and fantasy films of the 21st century by various media, grossed $756 million worldwide, and became the highest-grossing musical adaptation film of all time. Her performance drew widespread acclaim and earned her nominations for the Golden Globe Award, Critics' Choice Award, Screen Actors Guild Award, BAFTA Award, and Academy Award for Best Supporting Actress. The second part of the film adaptation, Wicked: For Good, was released in November 2025, earning her second nominations for the Golden Globe Award, Critics' Choice Award, and Screen Actors Guild Award for Best Supporting Actress, becoming the second actress to receive nominations for a reprised role at the Critics' Choice Awards and Screen Actors Guild Awards. She starred as the protagonist Peaches in the short film Brighter Days Ahead, which she directed and wrote with Christian Breslauer. This 26-minute film, accompanying the deluxe version of her album Eternal Sunshine, was inspired by the film Eternal Sunshine of the Spotless Mind. It explores themes of love, loss, and memory, featuring both real-life home videos and fictionalized scenes from her album's narrative. The short film also marked her directorial debut. Grande's upcoming film projects include Focker-in-Law (2026) and an animated film adaptation of Dr. Seuss's 1990 book Oh, the Places You'll Go!, slated for release in March 2028.

== Music videos ==
Key
•	Denotes music videos directed by Ariana Grande

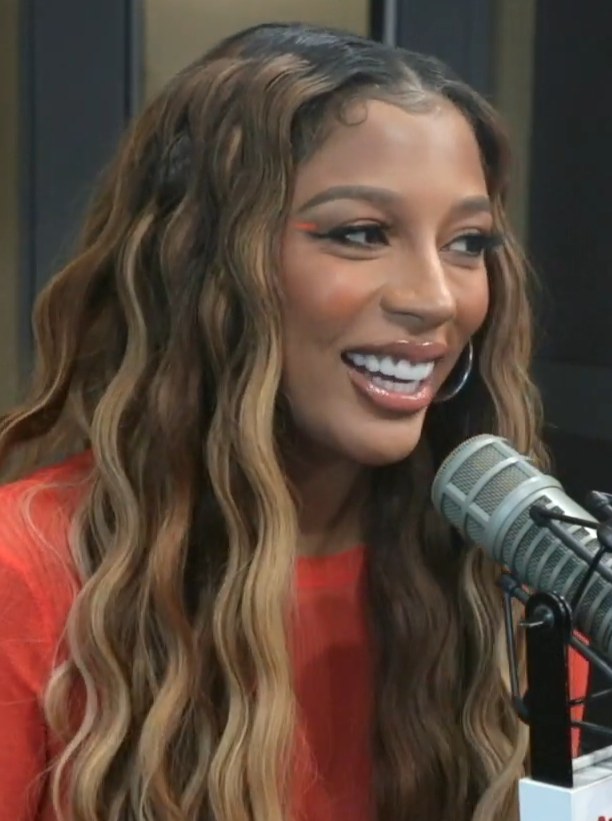
Victoria Monét features in the music videos for "7 Rings", "Monopoly", "Thank U, Next" and "Positions"

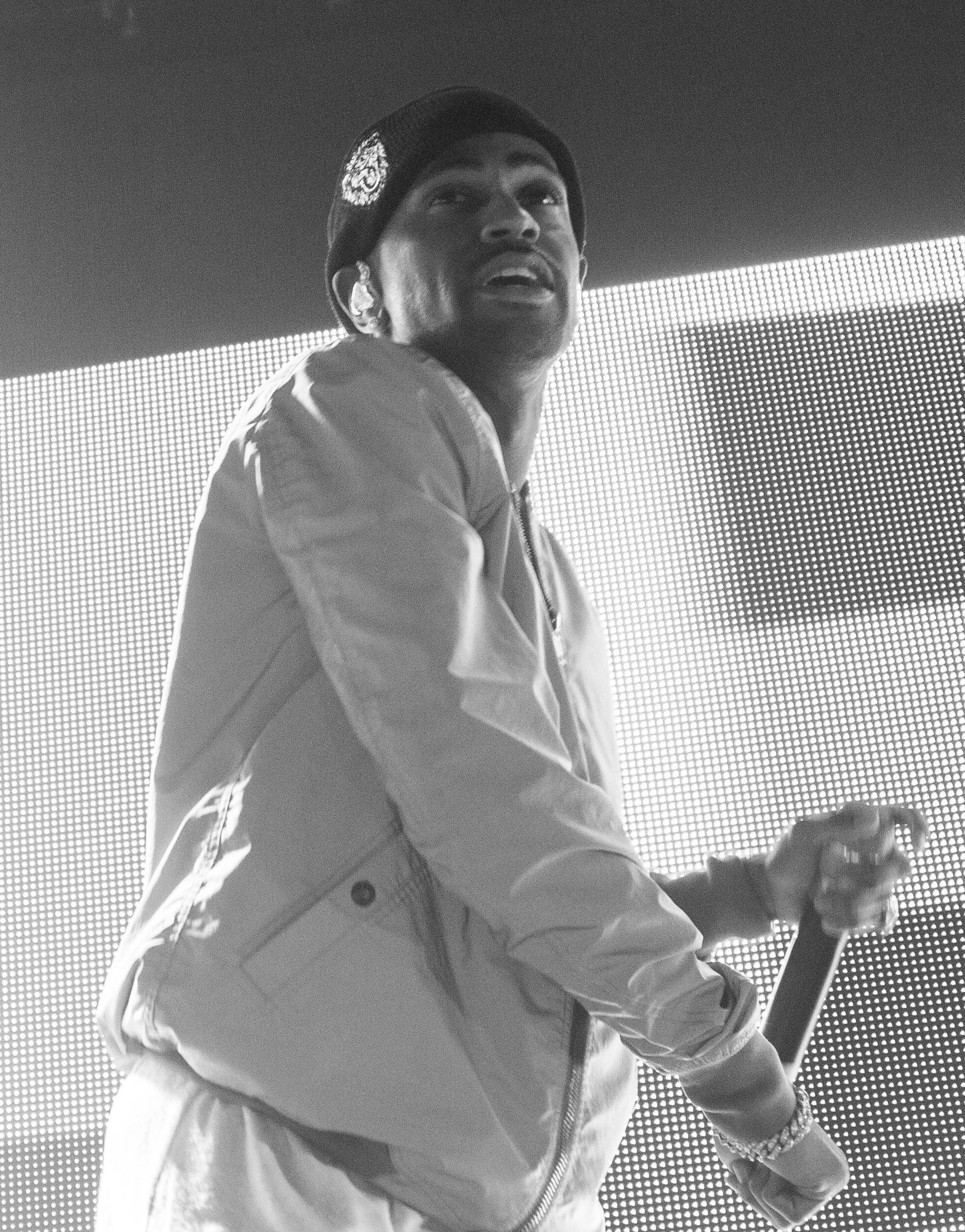
Rapper Big Sean appears on the songs and videos for "Right There" and "Problem".

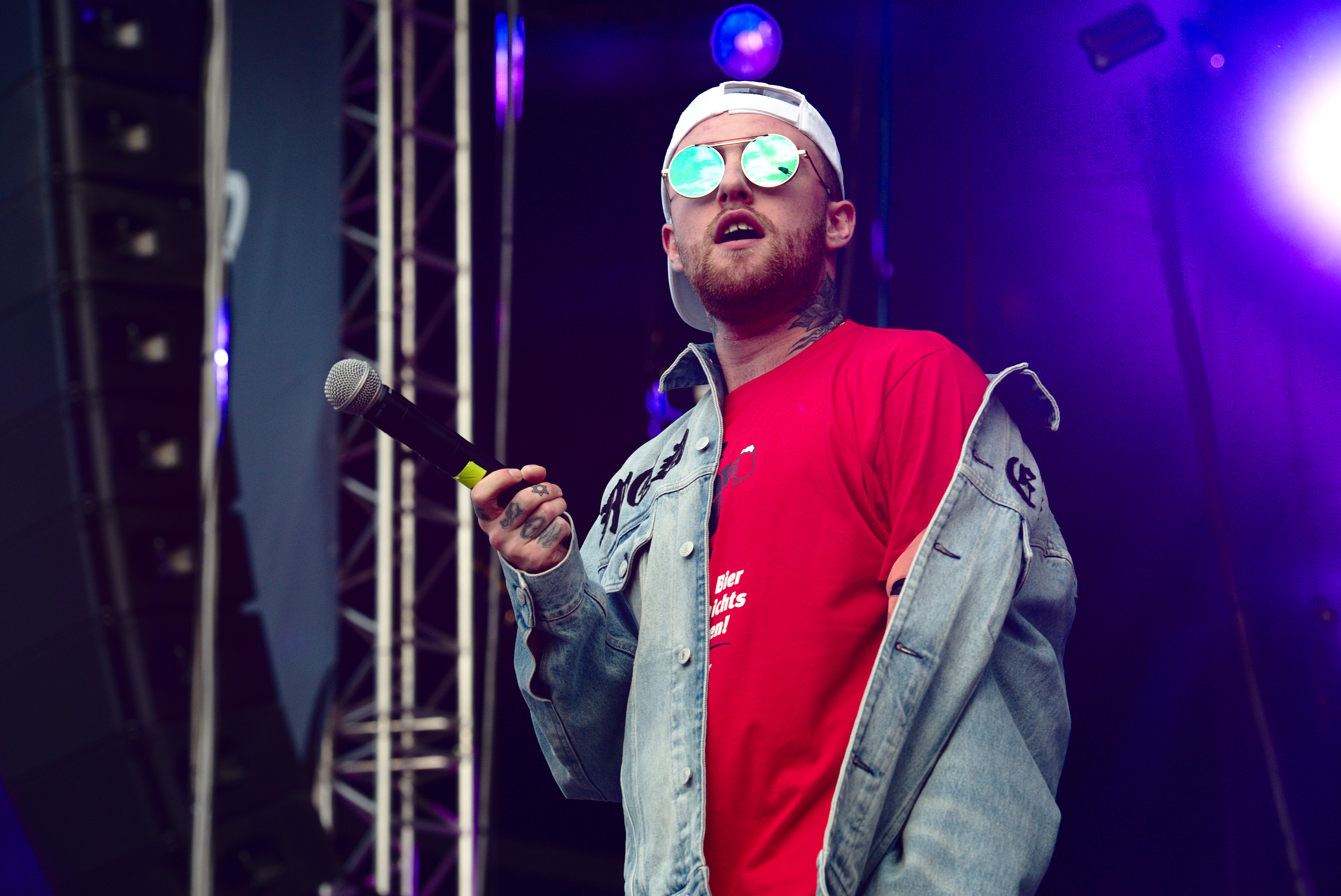
The late Mac Miller appeared with Grande on both songs and videos for "The Way" and "My Favorite Part".

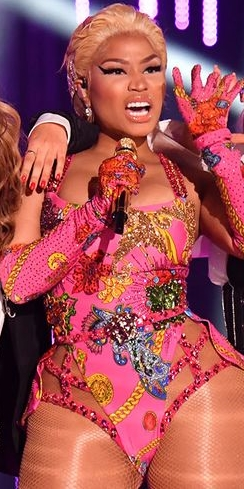
Trinidadian-born rapper Nicki Minaj features on the music videos of "Bang Bang", "Side to Side" and "The Light Is Coming"

=== As lead artist ===
List of music videos as lead artist
Title	Year	Other artist(s)	Director(s)	Description	Ref.
"Put Your Hearts Up"	2011	None	Meiert Avis; Jeremy Alter	In the video, Grande walks through the streets of a city sending love to lonely people while dancing and singing.	
"The Way"	2013	Mac Miller	Jones Crow	The video features her and Mac Miller in a studio-like setting, with projections of each other behind them. The video, shows them singing to each other and dancing in a space filled with balloons.	
"Almost Is Never Enough"	2013	Nathan Sykes	Nev Todorovic	In the video, the two singers are in a studio setting, interspersed with footage from the movie The Mortal Instruments: City of Bones, showing them singing, hugging, and playfully interacting with each other.	
"Baby I"	2013	None	Ryan Pallotta	Inspired by early 90s music videos, it features Grande in a variety of colorful outfits, showcasing choreographed dance moves, and singing in front of graffitied walls. It also includes a house party scene with giant Crayola crayons and scenes of Grande dancing in the streets.	
"Right There"	2013	Big Sean	Nev Todorovic	A modern-day interpretation of Romeo and Juliet, set at a costume party in a mansion, Grande, dressed as Juliet, meets Patrick Schwarzenegger (Romeo) at the party and they navigate the event, eventually finding each other, and sharing a romantic moment. The video includes elements of the classic story, such as a masquerade ball and a late-night swim in a pool. Big Sean also appears as a priest.	
"Problem"	2014	Iggy Azalea	The Young Astronauts	The video features Grande in a series of 60s-inspired outfits, including a sequined minidress with go-go boots, and a white sweater with high socks, often performing choreography with backup dancers against spiral backdrops. Iggy Azalea appears in the video, notably with a hairstyle reminiscent of Barbarella. The video also includes cameos from Big Sean, who whispers the hook "I got one less problem without you".	
"Break Free"	2014	Zedd	Chris Marrs Piliero	A science fiction-themed visual narrative, it depicts Grande as a character who rebels against an evil alien regime and frees prisoners from their captivity on a fictional planet. The video culminates with Grande and the freed prisoners escaping in a spaceship.	
"Bang Bang"	2014	Jessie J Nicki Minaj	Hannah Lux Davis	The video features the three artists in separate, personalized rooms, showcasing their individual styles. The video then culminates in a rooftop party where they perform together with backup dancers and fireworks.	
"Love Me Harder"	2014	The Weeknd	Hannah Lux Davis	The video opens with dramatic lightning in a sky boiling over with orange clouds. Throughout the music video, Ariana and the Weeknd withstand earth, wind and water, symbolizing what one would do for love.	
"Santa Tell Me"	2014	None	Alfredo Flores; Jones Crow	The video features Grande with her friends dancing, laughing and giving gifts around her house along with a two-minute outtake section at the end.	
"One Last Time"	2015	None	Max Landis	The video depicts a fictional apocalypse where Earth is about to collide with a comet, "Eurydice". The video follows Grande and her boyfriend as they navigate a chaotic, urban environment, filled with panicked crowds and fiery destruction, searching for a place to spend their final moments together. It's shot in a found-footage style, similar to films like Cloverfield, with a first-person perspective, adding to the sense of immediacy and panic. The video also features a mini-reunion with her Victorious co-star, Matt Bennett.	
"E Più Ti Penso"	2015	Andrea Bocelli	Gaetano Morbioli	Filmed in Italy, the music video features both artists in a cinematic setting, with scenes alternating between images of Grande and Bocelli.	
"Focus"	2015	None	Hannah Lux Davis	A blend of futuristic and throwback aesthetics, with Grande in a pastel-toned world, often dancing with backup dancers in coordinated outfits, the video incorporates elements of Big Band futurism and geometric patterns. A key visual element is the prominent use of pink and purple, which are also the colors of Samsung's branding, suggesting product placement.	
"Dangerous Woman" (Note: Grande initially planned to release two versions of the music video, with "Visual 1" (the one released) focusing on sensuality and "Visual 2" being more cinematic. However, "Visual 2" was ultimately scrapped due to time constraints.)	2016	None	The Young Astronauts	The video features Grande in lingerie, sensually posing and interacting with the camera against a backdrop of blue and pink lights. It focuses on Grande's sensuality and transitions between shots of her in a lacy black bustier and garter set with occasional static-like visual distortions. It's a visual representation of the song's themes of empowerment, sensuality, and transformation, with Grande showcasing a more mature and liberated persona. The lingerie and poses contribute to the "dangerous woman" persona, suggesting a confident and alluring woman unafraid to express her sexuality. It's a departure from Grande's previous, more innocent image, signifying her growth and evolution as an artist. The video notably features Grande with her hair down, a change from her signature high ponytail.	
"Let Me Love You"	2016	Lil Wayne	Grant Singer	In the video, Grande lounges around on her bed and couch in her black leather bustier, shorts and high heels asking a new man if she can love him. Lil Wayne makes a cameo appearance to deliver his rap verse.	
"Into You"	2016	None	Hannah Lux Davis	Grande and her love interest (played by Don Benjamin) dance, drink and fool around in and around a motel before it's revealed that he's also her bodyguard and their antics are actually a secret affair that she's hiding from her boyfriend.	
"Side to Side"	2016	Nicki Minaj	Hannah Lux Davis	The video opens with Grande leading a spin class on stationary bicycles, showcasing synchronized choreography with backup dancers. It then transitions to gym and locker room scenes, with Grande and dancers using boxing equipment. Grande and Minaj also appear in a sauna surrounded by male models. The video incorporates product placement from Guess.	
"Everyday"	2017	Future	Chris Marrs Piliero	The video showcases a variety of couples of different ages, races, and sexual orientations kissing and becoming intimate in public spaces like streets, a laundromat, and on a bus. Grande performs the song while these intimate moments unfold, and Future raps his verse surrounded by office workers.	
"Beauty and the Beast"	2017	John Legend	Dave Meyers	Grande and Legend perform the song in an opulent ballroom, reminiscent of the iconic dance scene from the film. Grande wears a red dress that served as a nod to the magical rose that cursed the young prince; she was surrounded by dancers that made up the flower's petals.	
"No Tears Left to Cry"	2018	None	Dave Meyers	The video features a dreamlike, disorienting cityscape where she moves fluidly through a world turned upside down. It uses visual effects to create a sense of disorientation, with Grande walking on walls and ceilings, and a revolving hallway. The video explores themes of disorientation, disillusionment, and the ambiguity of finding one's footing in a chaotic world. It's a symbolic representation of her overcoming grief and finding strength after the Manchester attack, with a subtle tribute to the city in the form of a worker bee at the video's end.	
"The Light Is Coming"	2018	Nicki Minaj	Dave Meyers	Primarily set in a dark, misty forest, creating a visually striking contrast with the glowing orbs of light, Grande is seen running through the woods, seemingly trying to chase away the darkness with the light emanating from the orbs. Minaj appears briefly to perform her rap verse.	
"God Is a Woman"	2018	None	Dave Meyers	A visual exploration of female empowerment and sexuality, the video features Grande as a powerful, god-like figure, reimagining classic artworks like Michelangelo's Creation of Creation of Adam and Greek mythology (referencing figures like Gaia, Cerberus, and the she-wolf who raised Romulus and Remus), and astronomy, all while celebrating the power of female sexuality and creation. It also includes a cameo from Madonna's voice, reciting a gender-flipped version of a speech from Pulp Fiction.	
"Breathin"	2018	None	Hannah Lux Davis	In the video, she is wandering through a busy train station and later swinging through a cloudy sky, visually representing her struggles with anxiety.	
"Thank U, Next"	2018	None	Hannah Lux Davis	The video is a nostalgic homage to four iconic early 2000s movies: Mean Girls, Legally Blonde, 13 Going on 30, and Bring It On. It features Grande embodying characters from each film, including Regina George, Elle Woods, Jenna Rink, and a cheerleader, alongside celebrity cameos and recreations of memorable scenes. The video serves as a reflection on her past relationships, highlighting how they contributed to her personal growth.	
"7 Rings"	2019	None	Hannah Lux Davis	The video features a pink-themed aesthetic with scenes of the singer partying with friends, showering champagne on a tower of glasses, and showcasing her signature long ponytail.	
"Break Up with Your Girlfriend, I'm Bored"	2019	None	Hannah Lux Davis	The video opens with Grande in a nightclub, noticing a man (played by Charles Melton) who is with a woman who strongly resembles Grande. Grande is seen at a house party, seemingly trying to seduce Melton while also engaging with his girlfriend. who strongly resembles Grande herself. The video then shows Grande trying to win his affection, often interacting with his girlfriend, while also seemingly flirting with her. The video culminates with Grande and the look-alike girlfriend in a pool, suggesting a possible self-love theme.	
"Monopoly"	2019	Victoria Monét	Alfredo Flores; Ricky Álvarez	A playful, home-video-style clip featuring the two artists dancing on a rooftop. The video includes playful emojis and celebrates their success and close working relationship.	
"In My Head"	2019	None	Bardia Zeinali	Set in a bright, white, confined space, which can be interpreted as representing Grande's own mind, the video features Grande alone in a stark white room, embodying the song's theme of an idealized version of a person existing only in her mind. The video's minimalist style is a deliberate choice, contrasting with the more elaborate visuals of some of her other videos. It draws inspiration from late 90s and early 2000s music videos, particularly those that trapped artists in stark, futuristic white boxes. Visually it represents the song's theme of falling for an idealized version of someone, a version that only exists in her head.	
"Boyfriend"	2019	Social House	Hannah Lux Davis	The music video depicts a dysfunctional relationship where both individuals are jealous and fantasize about violence against each other's flirtatious encounters. The video portrays their on-again, off-again relationship, with scenes of them seeking counseling, being jealous at a party, and engaging in passionate intimacy. The video ends with their counselor giving up on them, leaving them to their destructive behavior.	
"Don't Call Me Angel"	2019	Miley Cyrus; Lana Del Rey	Hannah Lux Davis	The music video features the trio in a rebellious, empowered portrayal of the Charlie's Angels theme, showcasing each artist in distinct settings: Grande in a mansion, Cyrus in a boxing ring, and Del Rey in a high-tech control room, all while wearing black angel costumes and wings. The video emphasizes female strength and challenges traditional notions of femininity, with the artists rejecting the "angel" label and asserting their independence and power.	
"Stuck with U"	2020	Justin Bieber	Scooter Braun; Rory Kramer; Alfredo Flores	The music video features a compilation of fan-submitted videos alongside footage of the artists and their significant others during the COVID-19 pandemic. The video showcases couples, families, and friends spending time together while self-isolating, reflecting the song's theme of finding connection during a time of distance.	
"Rain on Me"	2020	Lady Gaga	Robert Rodriguez	The video starts with Gaga lying on the ground, with a dagger stuck in her thigh, which she later pulls out. Gaga appears in a pink outfit and platform boots, leading a troupe of dancers also dressed in pink, while Grande wears a purple outfit and a shiny black metallic miniskirt with butterfly wings, with her respective group of dancers also in purple. They are all dancing inside a giant arena during a rainstorm, with daggers falling from the sky. At one point in the clip, Gaga sports Grande's trademark high pony hairstyle, with Grande having her hair down. The video also features some dramatic close-ups of Gaga with rain pouring down her face behind a pane of glass and a scene where the two singers are holding hands, each with lengthy Sailor Moon hair floating in the wind behind them. The video ends with a shot of the two singers hugging each other.	
"Positions"	2020	None	Dave Meyers	The video depicts Grande as the President of the United States, showcasing her in various settings like the kitchen, bedroom, and boardroom.	
"34+35"	2020	None	Director X	The video starts with Grande in a lab, wearing a lab coat. She can be seen scribbling notes and maneuvering machinery. Grande also studies a robot version of herself and struggles to make the robot come to life.	
"34+35 Remix"	2021	Doja Cat; Megan Thee Stallion	Stefan Kohli	The video showcases a luxurious sleepover with the three artists lounging in lingerie, drinking champagne, ordering room service, and goofing around with a camcorder.	
"Yes, And?"	2024	None	Christian Breslauer	A visual response to criticism and a celebration of personal growth, inspired by Paula Abdul's "Cold Hearted", the video depicts Grande performing for a group of initially critical onlookers, who are eventually won over by her confidence and choreography. It uses symbolism like crumbling statues and a shift to warmer colors to represent Grande's journey from vulnerability to empowerment.	
"We Can't Be Friends (Wait for Your Love)"	2024	None	Christian Breslauer	The music video is a visual narrative inspired by the film Eternal Sunshine of the Spotless Mind. The video depicts Grande undergoing a memory erasure procedure to forget an ex-boyfriend, played by Evan Peters, as she revisits and then erases moments from their relationship. The video concludes with Grande and Peters, now with different partners, passing each other in the street, highlighting the idea of moving on and finding happiness with new beginnings.	
"The Boy Is Mine"	2024	None	Christian Breslauer	Inspired by Michelle Pfeiffer's portrayal in Batman Returns, it features Grande as a Catwoman-esque character. She creates a love potion for Penn Badgley's character, the mayor, who has released stray cats to combat a rat infestation. The video also includes cameos from Brandy and Monica, who originally sang the hit song "The Boy Is Mine".	
"Supernatural" •	2025	None	Christian Breslauer; Ariana Grande	The video, a part of Ariana Grande's short film Brighter Days Ahead, depicts a scene of a fiery, post-accident setting where Grande's character is seemingly abducted by a spaceship. The imagery of floating upwards into a beam of light is reminiscent of the album cover for Eternal Sunshine Deluxe: Brighter Days Ahead where Grande is also depicted floating.	
"Twilight Zone" •	2025	None	Christian Breslauer; Ariana Grande	Also, a part of Grande's Brighter Days Ahead short film, the video begins with an elderly Ariana Grande watching a video of her younger self waking up in a ruined home with imagery of a burnt teddy bear and other toys, suggesting a traumatic event. The video then transitions to the younger Grande navigating a flooded, dilapidated house, with the scene's ethereal blue tones and reflections blurring the lines between memory, dream, and reality. The video also connects to her "Supernatural" video, showing her leaving the house and being beamed up by a UFO.	
"Hate That I Made You Love Me"	2026	None	Christian Breslauer		
"Petal"	2026	None	Christian Breslauer		

=== As featured artist ===
List of music videos as featured artist
Title	Year	Other artist(s)	Director(s)	Ref.
"L.A. Boyz"	2012	Victorious cast Victoria Justice	Unknown	
"Popular Song"	2013	Mika	Chris Marrs Piliero	
"Boys Like You"	2015	Who Is Fancy; Meghan Trainor	Unknown	
"This Is Not a Feminist Song"	2016	Saturday Night Live cast	Matt Villines; Osmany Rodríguez	
"My Favorite Part"	2016	Mac Miller	_p	
"Faith"	2016	Stevie Wonder	Alan Bibby	
"Bed"	2018	Nicki Minaj	Hype Williams	
"Dance to This"	2018	Troye Sivan	Bardia Zeinali	
"Rule the World"	2019	2 Chainz	Sebastian Sdaigui	
"Oh Santa!"	2020	Mariah Carey; Jennifer Hudson	Hamish Hamilton; Roman Coppola	
"It Was a... (Masked Christmas)"	2021	Jimmy Fallon; Megan Thee Stallion	Dan Opsal	

=== Guest appearances ===
List of music videos as guest performer
Title	Year	Artist(s)	Director(s)	Ref.
"Make It Shine"	2010	Victoria Justice	Unknown	
"Freak the Freak Out"	2010	Victoria Justice	Marcus Wagner	
"Beggin' on Your Knees"	2011	Victoria Justice	Marcus Wagner	
"Leave It All to Shine"	2011	iCarly and Victorious casts featuring Miranda Cosgrove; Victoria Justice	Unknown	
"Unfriend You"	2011	Greyson Chance	Marc Klasfeld	
"All I Want Is Everything"	2011	Victoria Justice	Lex Halaby	
"Make It in America"	2012	Victoria Justice	Anna Mastro	
"Here's 2 Us"	2012	Victoria Justice	Unknown	
"You Don't Know Me"	2012	Elizabeth Gillies	Unknown	
"Earth"	2019	Lil Dicky	Nigel Tierney; Federico Heller; Tony Yacenda	

== Filmography ==
=== Film ===
Key
†	Denotes films that have not yet been released

Year	Title	Role(s)	Director	Notes	Ref.
2011	Snowflake, the White Gorilla	Snowflake	Andrés G. Schaer	Voice; English dub	
2015	Jem and the Holograms	Herself	Jon M. Chu	Deleted scenes	
2016	Zoolander 2	Latex BDSM	Ben Stiller	Cameo	
2016	Underdogs	Laura	Juan José Campanella	Voice; English dub	
2019	Men in Black: International	Herself	F. Gary Gray	Uncredited cameo	
2020	Ariana Grande: Excuse Me, I Love You	Herself	Paul Dugdale	Also executive producer	
2021	Billie Eilish: The World's a Little Blurry	Herself	R. J. Cutler	Documentary	
2021	Don't Look Up	Riley Bina	Adam McKay		
2024	Wicked	Galinda "Glinda" Upland	Jon M. Chu	Credited as Ariana Grande-Butera	
2025	Brighter Days Ahead	Peaches	Christian Breslauer, Ariana Grande	Short film; also co-writer, co-director and executive producer	
2025	Wicked: For Good	Galinda "Glinda" Upland	Jon M. Chu	Credited as Ariana Grande-Butera	
2026	Focker-in-Law	Olivia Jones	John Hamburg		
2028	Oh, the Places You'll Go! †	TBA	Jill Culton, Jon M. Chu	Voice; in production	

=== Television ===
Year	Title	Role(s)	Network	Notes	Ref.
2009	The Battery's Down	Bat Mitzvah Riffer	YouTube	Episode: "Bad Bad News"	
2010–2013	Victorious	Cat Valentine	Nickelodeon	Main role; 57 episodes	
2011	iCarly	Cat Valentine	Nickelodeon	Episode: "iParty with Victorious"	
2011	BrainSurge	Herself (Contestant)	Nickelodeon	Episode 225	
2011–2013	Winx Club	Princess Diaspro (voice)	Nickelodeon	Recurring role; 13 episodes	
2012	Figure It Out	Herself (Contestant)	Nickelodeon	Season 5; 2 episodes	
2013	Swindle	Amanda Benson	Nickelodeon	Television movie	
2013–2014	Sam & Cat	Cat Valentine	Nickelodeon	Lead role; 35 episodes	
2014	Family Guy	Italian daughter (voice)	Fox	Episode: "Mom's the Word"	
2014–2025	Saturday Night Live	Herself (host/musical guest)	NBC	5 episodes: 3 as host, 3 as musical guest	
2015	Scream Queens	Sonya Herfmann / Chanel #2	Fox	Recurring role (season 1); 4 episodes	
2015, 2023	RuPaul's Drag Race	Herself (guest judge)	Logo TV	2 episodes	
2016	Hairspray Live!	Penny Pingleton	NBC	Television special	
2017	One Love Manchester	Herself (performer)	BBC One	Concert special	
2017	Carpool Karaoke: The Series	Herself	Apple Music	Episode: "Seth MacFarlane & Ariana Grande"	
2018	Ariana Grande at the BBC	Herself (performer)	BBC One	Concert special	
2018	A Very Wicked Halloween	Herself	NBC	Television special	
2019	Keeping Up with the Kardashians	Herself	E!	Episode: "Fire Escape"	
2020	Kidding	Piccola Grande	Showtime	Episode: "Episode 3101"	
2020	The Disney Family Singalong	Herself	ABC	Television special	
2020	Mariah Carey's Magical Christmas Special	Herself	Apple TV+	Television special	
2021	The Voice	Herself (coach)	NBC	Season 21	
2023	RuPaul's Drag Race: Untucked	Herself	MTV	Episode: "Untucked – One Night Only, Pt. 2"	
2024	Simone Biles Rising	Herself	Netflix	Cameo (uncredited)	
2024	Defying Gravity: The Curtain Rises on Wicked	Herself	NBC	Wicked's NBC Behind-the-scenes special	
2025	Wicked: One Wonderful Night	Herself (performer)	NBC	Television special	
2025	RuPaul's Drag Race All Stars	Herself (guest judge)	Paramount+	Episode: "Wicked Good"	

=== Web ===
Title	Year	Role(s)	Notes	Ref.
Ariana Grande: Dangerous Woman Diaries	2018	Herself	YouTube Docuseries	
Carpool Karaoke	2018	Herself		
Justin Bieber: Seasons	2020	Herself	Episode: "Leaving the Spotlight"	
Hot Ones	2024	Herself	Episode: "Ariana Grande Hits a High Note While Eating Spicy Wings"	
Actors on Actors	2024	Herself	Episode: "Ariana Grande & Paul Mescal"	
Actors on Actors	2025	Herself	Episode: “Ariana Grande & Adam Sandler”	[111]

=== Podcasts ===
Title	Year	Role(s)	Notes	Ref.
Backstage Pass with Eric Vetro	2021	Guest	Episode: "Ariana Grande"	
Las Culturistas	2024	Guest	Episode: "I’ve... Been Through"	
Podcrushed	2024	Guest	Episodes 71 & 72	
Shut Up Evan!	2024	Guest	Episode: Ariana Grande	
Sentimental Men Podcast	2024	Guest	Episode: "It's Wicked! It Has to Be Earned!" (with Ariana Grande)	
SmartLess	2025	Guest	Episode: "Ariana Grande"	
WTF with Marc Maron	2025	Guest	Episode 1616	
Good Hang with Amy Poehler	2025	Guest	Episode: "Ariana Grande Has No Problem With Being 5-Foot-2"	

=== Theater ===
Title	Year	Role(s)	Venue	Ref.
Annie	2001	Annie	Little Palm Family Theatre	
13	2008	Charlotte	Norma Terris Theatre	
13	2008–2009	Charlotte	Bernard B. Jacobs Theatre	
A Snow White Christmas	2012	Snow White	Pasadena Playhouse	
