= Twilight Zone (Ariana Grande song) =

2025 single by Ariana Grande

Single by Ariana Grande

from the album Eternal Sunshine Deluxe: Brighter Days Ahead
- B-side: "Twilight Zone" (a cappella)
- Released: April 8, 2025
- Recorded: 2024
- Studio: Jungle City (New York City); MXM (Stockholm); House Mouse (Stockholm)
- Genre: Synth-pop
- Length: 3:18
- Label: Republic
- Composers: Ariana Grande; Max Martin; Ilya Salmanzadeh
- Lyricist: Ariana Grande
- Producers: Ariana Grande; Max Martin; Ilya Salmanzadeh

Ariana Grande singles chronology
"Defying Gravity" (2024)	"Twilight Zone" (2025)	"Hate That I Made You Love Me" (2026)

Music video
- "Twilight Zone" on YouTube

"Twilight Zone" is a song by American singer-songwriter Ariana Grande, released by Republic Records on April 8, 2025, as the lead single from Eternal Sunshine Deluxe: Brighter Days Ahead (2025), the deluxe reissue of her seventh studio album, Eternal Sunshine (2024). Grande co-wrote and co-produced the song with Max Martin and Ilya Salmanzadeh. A 1980s-inspired synth-pop song, "Twilight Zone" has lyrics about betrayal and grief that contrast with its production.

"Twilight Zone" was well received by music critics, who praised Grande's songwriting and its production. The song peaked at number seven on the Billboard Global 200, reaching the top 10 in Malaysia, the Philippines, Singapore, and the United Kingdom, and the top 20 in Australia, Ireland, New Zealand, and the United States. The music video for "Twilight Zone" was directed by Christian Breslauer and premiered as part of the short film Brighter Days Ahead, before being released as a standalone video. Grande performed the song on the Eternal Sunshine Tour (2026).

== Background and production ==
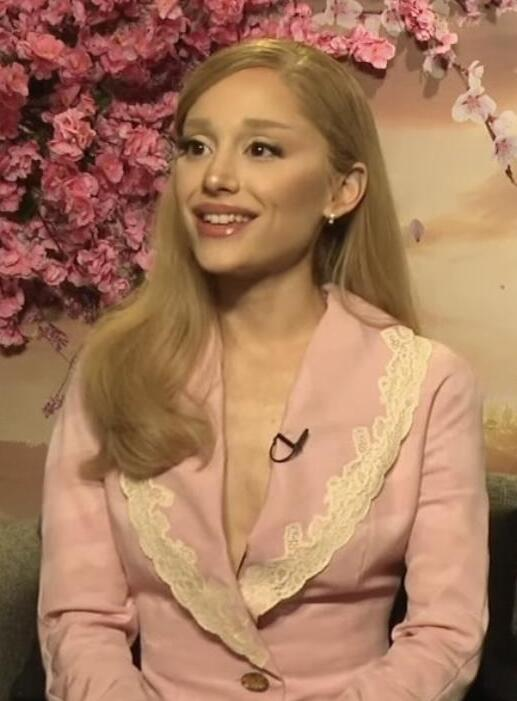
Ariana Grande in 2024.

On March 8, 2024, American singer-songwriter Ariana Grande released her seventh studio album, Eternal Sunshine, to critical acclaim, more than three years after her previous album. In July, Grande said that a deluxe edition was in production, but would not be released until the following year, due to her promotional commitments for the film Wicked. Rumors of the deluxe edition intensified as fans speculated for months following teasers. Between late February and early March 2025, Grande posted cryptic social media updates teasing the release of a deluxe version of Eternal Sunshine, which she titled Eternal Sunshine Deluxe: Brighter Days Ahead. She officially announced the title of the album's sixth track, "Twilight Zone", on March 17; a preview snippet was released on the "Brighter Days" hotline on March 25.

"Twilight Zone" is named after The Twilight Zone (1959–1964); Grande had often spoken about the series before the song was released. Grande, Max Martin, and Ilya Salmanzadeh wrote and produced the song. Grande wrote the lyrics and provided lead vocals. Martin and Salmanzadeh handled the instrumentation and programming, playing drums, bass, and keyboards, and contributing arrangements. Sam Holland and Lou Carrao engineered the song; it was recorded at Jungle City Studios in New York City, and at MXM Studios and House Mouse in Stockholm, Sweden. Serban Ghenea mixed the track, assisted by engineer Bryce Bordone at MixStar Studios in Virginia Beach, Virginia, while Randy Merrill mastered the track at Sterling Sound in Edgewater, New Jersey.

== Music and lyrics ==
"Twilight Zone" is a synth-pop song with a mid-tempo rhythm. Steven J. Horowitz of Variety wrote that the song is influenced by the 1980s, while Gary Grimes of Attitude said it is reminiscent of a night-drive aesthetic typical of Grande's frequent collaborator, The Weeknd. According to Taylor Henderson of Out, the production is "ethereal", "dreamy" and "breezy" with a "light" sound contrasted with themes of betrayal and disbelief over a past love. Grande sings in a light lyric soprano range; Danielle Holian of Atwood Magazine wrote that she delivers a "calm", "soothing" and "wistful" tone with a "plaintive" sound. Jordi Bardají of Jenesaispop described the song as a continuation of her 2024 single "We Can't Be Friends (Wait for Your Love)" due to their similarities in sound and concept.

Commentators interpreted the lyrics as a reference to Grande's relationship with her ex-husband Dalton Gomez. The song begins with the protagonist questioning her own memories: "Did I dream the whole thing? / Was I just a nightmare?" In response to being lied to, she compares her ex to the "best actor" and wonders whether his new partner can see through him. She questions whether she lost her identity in the relationship—"Or was I just not me at all?"—which Karcin Hagi of The Georgetown Voice interpreted as insecurity after a break-up. Kyle Denis of Billboard observed that the singer considers warning her ex's new partner about his manipulation, but stops after reflecting on her own efforts to maintain the relationship. She is caught between that external conflict and her internal conflict of protecting the person who hurt her. Hagi added that the narrator is aware of the remaining pain in her heart but finally accepts the past without trying to change it. She sings, "It's not that I miss you, I don't. Sometimes I just can't believe you happened", after which the music fades out to isolate her stacked a cappella vocals.

== Release and commercial performance ==
"Twilight Zone" was released on March 28, 2025, as part of Eternal Sunshine Deluxe: Brighter Days Ahead, the deluxe reissue of Eternal Sunshine. A cappella and instrumental versions followed on April 1, before Republic Records released the track to US contemporary hit radio on April 8 as the reissue's lead single. On June 20, a digital single with the main song alongside its instrumental and a cappella versions was issued. A music video for "Twilight Zone" premiered on March 28 as part of the 26-minute short film Brighter Days Ahead, directed by Christian Breslauer, which shows Grande wandering through a rustic house, finding it ransacked before walking downstairs to a flooded ground level and leaving the house. It was uploaded as a standalone video on June 20.

"Twilight Zone" debuted and peaked at number seven on the Billboard Global 200 for the issue dated April 12, 2025. The same week, the single reached number 18 on the Billboard Hot 100 chart in the United States. It peaked at number five on the US Pop Airplay chart on July 5, and entered the Canadian Hot 100 at number 23. The single peaked at number five on the UK Singles Chart and was awarded a Silver certification by the British Phonographic Industry (BPI). It reached the top 20 in Australia (number 16) and New Zealand (number 17), where it earned Gold certifications. Elsewhere, it entered the top 10 in several Asian countries, such as Singapore (number six), Malaysia (number seven), and the Philippines (number seven).

== Critical reception ==
"Twilight Zone" was well received by music critics; Megan LaPierre of Exclaim! called the song the highlight of the Eternal Sunshine project. Critics Brittany Spanos of Rolling Stone and Danielle Holian of Atwood Magazine considered the song a "standout" on the album's deluxe edition; Holian called it an "introspective", "heartfelt" track that has "smooth" production. In a ranking of the album's deluxe tracks, Billboard contributor Kyle Denis placed it third and described it as a "formidable" follow-up to "We Can't Be Friends (Wait for Your Love)". On its mid-year list of the 50 best songs of 2025, the publication ranked "Twilight Zone" 17th and praised Grande's songwriting on the track as "ever-impressive".

Maria Murphy of Impact 89FM characterized "Twilight Zone" as a "beautiful" track and noted that Grande can convey "meaningful messages through very realistic lyrics". In 34th Street Magazine, Howe Chen wrote that the "hypnotic" track is backed by "delicate synths" and is a "subtle yet powerful demonstration that moving on is far from linear". Neon Music's Marcus Adetola called the song "haunting, unfinished" yet carried by a "more honest" delivery than a polished one, and labeled it "the one that quietly cuts deepest".

== Live performances ==
During Act IV of the Eternal Sunshine Tour (2026), Grande sang "Twilight Zone" alongside "Past Life", "Hampstead", "Dangerous Woman", and "Honeymoon Avenue". She wore a custom purple off-the-shoulder dress by Vivienne Westwood, featuring black lace details, with sheer gloves, Christian Louboutin boots and a ribbon choker.

== Track listing ==
- Digital download and streaming

1. "Twilight Zone" – 3:18
2. "Twilight Zone" (a cappella) – 3:01
3. "Twilight Zone" (instrumental) – 3:18

- 7-inch vinyl, cassette, and CD

1. "Twilight Zone" – 3:18
2. "Twilight Zone" (a cappella) – 3:01

== Credits and personnel ==
Adapted from the liner notes of the "Twilight Zone" 7-inch vinyl single.

=== Locations ===
- Recorded at Jungle City Studios (New York City), MXM Studios (Stockholm), and House Mouse (Stockholm)
- Mixed at MixStar Studio (Virginia Beach, Virginia)
- Mastered at Sterling Sound (Edgewater, New Jersey)

=== Credits ===
- Ariana Grande – vocals, songwriter, producer, lyricist
- Max Martin – songwriter, producer, programmer, arranger, drummer, bassist, keyboardist
- Ilya Salmanzadeh – songwriter, producer, programmer, arranger, drummer, bassist, keyboardist
- Sam Holland – audio engineer
- Lou Carrao – audio engineer
- Serban Ghenea – mixer
- Bryce Bordone – mixing engineer
- Randy Merrill – mastering engineer

== Charts ==
=== Weekly charts ===
Weekly chart performance for "Twilight Zone"
Chart (2025–2026)	Peak position
Argentina Anglo Airplay (Monitor Latino)	7
Australia (ARIA)	16
Brazil Hot 100 (Billboard)	95
Canada Hot 100 (Billboard)	23
Canada CHR/Top 40 (Billboard)	3
Canada Hot AC (Billboard)	21
Colombia Anglo Airplay (Monitor Latino)	14
CIS Airplay (TopHit)	185
Croatia International Airplay (Top lista)	28
Ecuador Anglo Airplay (Monitor Latino)	11
Estonia Airplay (TopHit)	42
Finland Airplay (Suomen virallinen lista)	19
France (SNEP)	114
Germany (GfK)	89
Global 200 (Billboard)	7
Greece International (IFPI)	14
Guatemala Anglo Airplay (Monitor Latino)	5
Ireland (IRMA)	12
Japan Hot Overseas (Billboard Japan)	4
Lithuania (AGATA)	85
Lithuania Airplay (TopHit)	34
Malaysia International (RIM)	7
Malta Airplay (Radiomonitor)	8
Netherlands (Single Top 100)	55
New Zealand (Recorded Music NZ)	17
Norway (VG-lista)	49
Paraguay Anglo Airplay (Monitor Latino)	9
Philippines (Philippines Hot 100)	7
Philippines (IFPI)	9
Portugal (AFP)	46
Romania Airplay (TopHit)	185
Singapore (RIAS)	6
Slovakia Airplay (ČNS IFPI)	52
Spain (Promusicae)	78
South Africa Airplay (TOSAC)	18
Sweden (Sverigetopplistan)	60
Switzerland (Schweizer Hitparade)	47
UK Singles (Official Charts)	5
US Billboard Hot 100	18
US Adult Contemporary (Billboard)	30
US Adult Pop Airplay (Billboard)	23
US Pop Airplay (Billboard)	5
Venezuela Anglo Airplay (Monitor Latino)	6

=== Monthly charts ===
Monthly chart performance for "Twilight Zone"
Chart (2025)	Peak position
Estonia Airplay (TopHit)	66
Lithuania Airplay (TopHit)	38

=== Year-end charts ===
Year-end chart performance for "Twilight Zone"
Chart (2025)	Position
Argentina Anglo Airplay (Monitor Latino)	68
Canada (Canadian Hot 100)	75
Philippines (Philippines Hot 100)	87
US Pop Airplay (Billboard)	25

== Certifications ==
Certifications for "Twilight Zone"
Region	Certification	Certified units/sales
Australia (ARIA)	Gold	35,000^{‡}
Brazil (Pro-Música Brasil)	Platinum	40,000^{‡}
New Zealand (RMNZ)	Gold	15,000^{‡}
United Kingdom (BPI)	Silver	200,000^{‡}
^{‡} Sales+streaming figures based on certification alone.

== Release history ==
Release date and format for "Twilight Zone"
Region	Date	Format(s)	Version(s)	Label	Ref.
United States	April 8, 2025	Contemporary hit radio	Original	Republic	
Various	June 20, 2025	Digital download; streaming	Original; a cappella; instrumental	Republic	
Germany	July 25, 2025	7-inch vinyl	Original; a cappella	Republic	
Italy	July 25, 2025	7-inch vinyl	Original; a cappella	Republic	
United Kingdom	July 25, 2025	7-inch vinyl; cassette; CD	Original; a cappella	Republic	
United States	July 25, 2025	7-inch vinyl; cassette; CD	Original; a cappella	Republic	
