= Eternal Sunshine Deluxe: Brighter Days Ahead =

- Standard cover (Note: On digital platforms and original cover physical editions)

Studio album (reissue) by Ariana Grande
- Released: March 28, 2025
- Recorded: 2024
- Genre: Synth-pop
- Length: 55:21
- Label: Republic
- Producers: Ariana Grande; Max Martin; Ilya; Davidior; Aaron Paris; Shintaro Yasuda; Nick Lee; Will Loftis; Luka Kloser; Oscar Görres

Ariana Grande chronology
Wicked: The Soundtrack (2024)	Eternal Sunshine Deluxe: Brighter Days Ahead (2025)	Wicked: For Good – The Soundtrack (2025)

Singles from Eternal Sunshine Deluxe: Brighter Days Ahead
- 1. "Twilight Zone" Released: April 8, 2025

Eternal Sunshine Deluxe: Brighter Days Ahead (stylized in all lowercase) is a reissue of Eternal Sunshine (2024), the seventh studio album by American singer and songwriter Ariana Grande. It was released by Republic Records on March 28, 2025, more than a year after the original album.

== Background and release ==
In July 2024, Ariana Grande revealed that a deluxe edition of her seventh studio album, Eternal Sunshine, was in production but not set for release "any time super soon" due to her promotional commitments to Wicked. She stated at the 82nd Golden Globes that it was created in 2024 and would be released "at some point". On February 27, 2025, Grande's "sweetener" Instagram account was renamed to "brighterdays". A fake "Brighter Days" hotline was made public on March 4, which included a voicemail greeting of Grande advertising a memory erasure procedure—a reference to the plot of the "We Can't Be Friends (Wait for Your Love)" music video and the film Eternal Sunshine of the Spotless Mind—at the fictitious "Brighter Days Clinic". A teaser trailer, featuring goods inside a box being lit on fire (a scene from the "We Can't Be Friends (Wait for Your Love)" music video), was released along with a pre-save link on March 8. The reissue, titled Eternal Sunshine Deluxe: Brighter Days Ahead, was announced on March 10, 2025; pre-orders began on the same day. Grande revealed the bonus tracks' titles and listing on March 17 via her social media. A snippet of deluxe track "Twilight Zone" was previewed via the "Brighter Days" hotline on March 25.

The reissue was released on March 28, 2025, via streaming, download, two CD variants, and two vinyl LP variants. The digital version contains the standard thirteen tracks and six bonus tracks, while the physical release comprises the pre-released remixes of "Yes, And?", "Supernatural", and "The Boy Is Mine" featuring other artists, in addition to the standard and bonus tracks. On April 1, 2025, three download-exclusive variants of the reissue were released via Grande's webstore and on streaming services: an instrumental edition, an a cappella edition, and an alternate cover.

== Title and cover art ==
The title Eternal Sunshine Deluxe: Brighter Days Ahead is derived from the fictitious "Brighter Days Clinic" in the "We Can't Be Friends (Wait for Your Love)" music video. The standard cover is a "zoomed-out" photograph of Grande in a white dress, levitating in the air, underneath a beam of white light—in the center of a black background. Los 40 called the cover a "metaphor for the album's title", while Hypebeast described it as a "fitting visual for an album promising 'brighter days ahead'".

== Music and lyrics ==
The first bonus track is an extended version of "Intro (End of the World)". It further expands on the contemplations and questioning of Grande's relationship with her significant other. In the lyrics, she loops back to the ongoing theme of memory erasure from the album. It is followed by "Twilight Zone", a synth-pop track which explores the liminal space of romantic relationships; various publications described it as a spiritual sequel to "We Can't Be Friends (Wait for Your Love)". "Warm" chronicles the feelings of starting a new relationship following a divorce. "Dandelion" has a jazzy intro which drops into the main beat. The song is about intimacy and Grande granting her lover's desires. "Past Life", the second to last track, is about moving on from a relationship that is no longer working. "Hampstead", the closing track, is titled after the London area where Grande lived while filming Wicked (2024) and Wicked: For Good (2025). The piano-driven ballad discusses the media scrutiny Grande received as a result of her divorce from ex-husband Dalton Gomez and subsequent relationship with Wicked co-star Ethan Slater.

== Critical reception ==
Professional ratings
Review scores
Source	Rating
Attitude	4/5 stars
Rolling Stone	4/5 stars

Rob Sheffield of Rolling Stone rated the album with 4 out of 5 stars. He praised the new songs for hitting as hard as the original tracks and described the album as a continuation of her deeply emotional narrative. Writing for Variety, Steven Horowitz praised the album's songwriting and emphasized how Grande is one of "pop music's most under-appreciated songwriters, consistently matching concept with execution, and what gave Eternal Sunshine the type of heft that only the best therapy-pop can provide". Attitude's Gary Grimes found it "a fitting place to press pause on what has been a remarkable run from one of our most accomplished pop stars".

She's experimented with genres and become more vulnerable in her songwriting, setting countless records along the way and carving out her place in the ranks of pop's greats.

— The Recording Academy praising Ariana Grande's songwriting

The album's musical tonality was often complimented. Reagan Denning of Melodic Magazine and Amelia Knust from Washington Square News complimented the addition of synth-pop style, describing the album's atmosphere as "haunting melodies and eerie synths to create a ethereal listening experience" and "adding a new layer of synth-pop perfection".

== Commercial performance ==
In the United States, Brighter Days Ahead's first-week streams and downloads helped return Eternal Sunshine to number one on the Billboard 200, earning 137,000 album-equivalent units, including 98.45 million on-demand streams and 61,000 album sales. With the reissue, Eternal Sunshine claimed its 3rd non-consecutive week at number one, after more than a year away; further, Eternal Sunshine has the largest positional jump to number one (bolting 87-1) since Travis Scott's Days Before Rodeo. It was the most consumed album of the week, returning at number-one on both Billboard Top Vinyl Albums and Top Album Sales charts, claiming its 2nd non-consecutive week at number one.

== Short film ==
Concurrently with the reissue's release on March 28, a short film titled Brighter Days Ahead premiered via Grande's YouTube channel. Written and directed by Breslauer and Grande, the short film is set 70 years after the events of the "We Can't Be Friends (Wait for Your Love)" music video; Grande stars as Peaches, the fictional character introduced in the video. Three songs from the standard edition of the album and three from the reissue's bonus tracks are featured in the film. Co-produced by London Alley, the Lucky Bastards, Republic Records, and Grande, fan screenings of Brighter Days Ahead were held on March 30 in Boca Raton, Chicago, Los Angeles, and New York City.

== Track listing ==
Brighter Days Ahead edition
No.	Title	Lyrics	Music	Producer(s)	Length
14.	"Intro (End of the World)" (extended)	Ariana Grande	Grande; Shintaro Yasuda; Nick Lee; Aaron Cheung	Grande; Yasuda; Lee; Aaron Paris	2:41
15.	"Twilight Zone"	Grande	Grande; Max Martin; Ilya Salmanzadeh	Grande; Martin; Ilya	3:18
16.	"Warm"	Grande	Grande; Martin; Oscar Görres	Grande; Martin; Görres	3:21
17.	"Dandelion"	Grande	Grande; Martin; Ilya	Grande; Martin; Ilya	3:24
18.	"Past Life"	Grande	Grande; Martin; Ilya	Grande; Martin; Ilya	3:35
19.	"Hampstead"	Grande	Grande; Martin; Ilya	Grande; Martin; Ilya	3:36
Total length:					55:21

Physical edition additional tracks
No.	Title	Lyrics	Music	Producer(s)	Length
15.	"Yes, And?" (remix; with Mariah Carey)	Grande; Carey	Grande; Martin; Ilya; Carey	Grande; Martin; Ilya	3:35
16.	"Supernatural" (remix; with Troye Sivan)	Grande; Sivan; Brett McLaughlin	Grande; Martin; Görres	Grande; Martin; Görres	2:43
17.	"The Boy Is Mine" (remix; with Brandy and Monica)	Grande; Martin; Brandy Norwood; Monica Arnold	Grande; Martin; Ilya; Yasuda; Davidior	Grande; Martin; Ilya; Yasuda; Davidior	3:33
Total length:					65:16

=== Notes ===
- All track titles, except "Hampstead", are stylized in all lowercase.
- The first 13 tracks mirror the track listing of the standard edition of Eternal Sunshine.
- Two additional digital versions of the album were also released: one featuring a cappella versions of all tracks and another featuring instrumental versions.

== Personnel ==
=== Musicians ===
- Ariana Grande – lead vocals (all tracks)
- Shintaro Yasuda – keyboards, programming (track 14)
- Nick Lee – keyboards, programming, trombone (track 14)
- Aaron Cheung – bass, guitar, synthesizer, violin, programming (track 14)
- Ilya – bass, drums, keyboards, programming, co-arrangement (tracks 15, 17–19)
- Max Martin – bass, drums, co-arrangement (track 15, 17–19); keyboards, programming (tracks 15–19)
- Oscar Görres – keyboards, bass, drums, guitar, programming (track 16)
- Jesse McGinty – tenor saxophone, trombone, trumpet (track 17)
- Rashawn Ross – trumpet (track 17)
- Davide Rossi – violin, viola, cello, string arrangement (track 19)

=== Technical ===
- Serban Ghenea – mixing
- Bryce Bordone – mixing; engineering (track 15–19)
- Randy Merrill – mastering
- Eric Eylands – recording (track 14)
- Lou Carrao – engineering
- Sam Holland – engineering
- Daniel Clarke-DiCandilo – additional engineering (track 17)
- Jashua Conolly – additional engineering (track 17)

== Charts ==
Chart performance for Eternal Sunshine Deluxe: Brighter Days Ahead
Chart (2025)	Peak position
Argentine Albums (CAPIF)	3
Croatian International Albums (HDU)	2
Italian Albums (FIMI)	7
Japanese Western Albums (Oricon)	12
Lithuanian Albums (AGATA)	21
Malaysian Albums (RIM)	8
Norwegian Albums (VG-lista)	7
Portuguese Albums (AFP)	14
Slovak Albums (ČNS IFPI)	30

== Certifications ==
Certifications for Eternal Sunshine Deluxe: Brighter Days Ahead
Region	Certification	Certified units/sales
Brazil (Pro-Música Brasil)	2× Platinum	80,000^{‡}
^{‡} Sales+streaming figures based on certification alone.

== Release history ==
Release history for Eternal Sunshine Deluxe: Brighter Days Ahead
Region	Date	Format(s)	Version	Label	Ref.
Various	March 28, 2025	CD; vinyl LP; digital download; streaming	Standard	Republic	
United States	April 1, 2025	Digital download	Alternate digital cover; a cappella; instrumental	Republic	
Various	April 4, 2025	Streaming	Alternate digital cover; a cappella; instrumental	Republic	
