= Boys Like You (Who Is Fancy song) =

Single by Who Is Fancy featuring Meghan Trainor and Ariana Grande
- Released: November 23, 2015
- Recorded: 2015
- Studio: Beluga Heights (Los Angeles, California)
- Genre: Doo-wop; pop
- Length: 3:14
- Label: Republic
- Songwriters: Jake Hagood; Jonathan Rotem; Jason Gantt; Bob DiPiero
- Producer: J.R. Rotem

Who Is Fancy singles chronology
"Goodbye" (2015)	"Boys Like You" (2015)

Meghan Trainor singles chronology
"Like I'm Gonna Lose You" (2015)	"Boys Like You" (2015)	"No" (2016)

Ariana Grande singles chronology
"Focus" (2015)	"Boys Like You" (2015)	"Over and Over Again" (2016)

Music video
- "Boys Like You" on YouTube

"Boys Like You" is a song by American singer Who Is Fancy, featuring singer-songwriter Meghan Trainor and singer-songwriter Ariana Grande. Fancy co-wrote it with J.R. Rotem, Jason Gantt, and Bob DiPiero, while the former of the three handled production. Republic Records released the song for digital download and streaming as a single on November 23, 2015. The doo-wop and pop song has a beachy vibe and lyrics about Who Is Fancy, Trainor and Grande attempting to court the men they desire.

"Boys Like You" received mixed to positive reviews from music critics, some of whom appreciated its summer vibe while others pegged it as one of the less impressive offerings of Grande's catalog. The song charted at number 18 on the US Bubbling Under Hot 100 Singles chart and number 26 on the New Zealand Singles Chart, attaining a gold certification in the latter country. The animated music video for it was released a day prior to the single release, featuring the trio in animation. Who Is Fancy, Trainor, and Grande performed "Boys Like You" on Dancing with the Stars (2015).

== Background and release ==
Jake Hagood met Trainor in Nashville when she was 19 years old and the two were songwriters. In 2015, he signed with Big Machine Records and hired Scooter Braun as his manager, releasing his debut single "Goodbye" under the alias Who Is Fancy. He wrote "Boys Like You" with J.R. Rotem, Jason Gantt and Bob DiPiero, with production being solely handled by Rotem. Who Is Fancy recorded the song as a collaboration with Trainor and Grande. Grande recalled that it was "so much fun" because of Who Is Fancy's enthusiastic attitude, as he was "yelling positive and exciting remarks from the studio" during the recording.

Who Is Fancy announced "Boys Like You" as featuring only Grande on November 10, 2015, which she subsequently confirmed on her own Instagram account. The following day, he announced Trainor to be featured on the song. On November 12, Grande unveiled the song's artwork and release date, also teasing the lyrics "Try, try, try, to follow the rules. I break every one of em with boys like you". Republic Records released "Boys Like You" for digital download and streaming as a single on November 23. The song was serviced to contemporary hit radio stations in the United States on December 1, 2015.

== Composition and lyrics ==
"Boys Like You"
A 19-second sample of the chorus of "Boys Like You", a "'swaying' doo-wop pop number that lyrically hears the trio try to win the man of their dreams".

"Boys Like You" is a doo-wop and pop song with lyrics discussing Who Is Fancy, Trainor and Grande attempting to court the "man of their dreams". The song has been described as "beachy" and "infatuation-fueled". Teen Vogue's Ella Ceron remarked that it fuses the style of Trainor's "doo-wop-inspired love songs" and the "swinging '60s" vibe of Grande's music videos, describing the track as a "dreamy, slowed down song".

Emilee Lindner of MTV News wrote that Trainor and Grande give up "some real summery vibes" on "Boys Like You", noting that the song has a composition of "vibrant harmonies, [...] island-like shakers and wind chimes". According to her, Trainor's verse has an "old-school charm", that sees her deliver soulful vocals over a staccato piano beat, whereas Grande's verse, which includes the line: "Get so excited, boy you're making me blush/ Let's just take our time now, there ain't no need to rush", is flirtatious. Also for MTV News, Jessica Norton described the song as an "infectious, step-touch-snap-sway jam". Idolator's Bianca Gracie stated that it has a "beachy, eyelash-fluttering '60s vibe" and the website's Mike Wass called the song a "sassy anthem".

== Reception ==
"Boys Like You" was met with mixed to positive reviews from music critics. Ceron was positive of the song, stating that it "will make you want to tap your feet and snap your fingers together instantly", and jokingly remarked that the song "might just heat [the cold weather during its release] up all over again". Lindner made a similar comment when she wrote that the "simple little ditty" was released "just in time to combat our wintery shivers". Christina Garibaldi of MTV News called it a "soon-to-be hit [...] super infectious pop song". In a ranking of Grande's songs, Billboard's Richard S. He placed "Boys Like You" at number 100, elaborating that it was a "unique idea", but "the singsongy end result feels too much like a children's novelty song". Vulture's Justin Curto ranked the song as Grande's 27th best collaboration, noting that she "laps" the other two in her verse, but it is "all in good fun".

"Boys Like You" achieved its highest peak on the New Zealand Singles Chart, debuting at number 34 and peaking at number 26 two weeks later, certified gold by Recorded Music NZ (RMNZ) for selling 7,500 units in the country. The song further reached number 18 on the US Bubbling Under Hot 100 Singles chart. Additionally, it charted at number 84 on Czech Republic's Singles Digitál Top 100 chart, number 89 on Netherlands' Single Top 100 chart, and number 47 and 89 on the Polish Airplay Top 100 and Slovakia's Singles Digitál Top 100 charts, respectively.

== Promotion ==
The animated music video for "Boys Like You" was released on November 22, 2015. It features animated versions of Who Is Fancy, Trainor and Grande. They attempt to capture the attention of male pool cleaners while flirting with them. Seventeen's Kelsey Stiegman thought that one of the blonde pool boys in the video bore a resemblance to English actor Tom Felton.

The trio performed "Boys Like You" on the 21st season finale of Dancing with the Stars on November 24, 2015, for which Who Is Fancy wore a green sequined kaftan/jacket and was joined by some male dancers, Trainor, and then Grande. TMZ reported that Who Is Fancy's choreographer initially wanted the performance to feature two men dancing with each other, but was given a "definitive no" from the American Broadcasting Company (ABC).

== Credits and personnel ==
Credits were adapted from Tidal.

=== Recording locations ===
- Recorded and engineered at Beluga Heights Studio (Los Angeles, California)
- Mixed at MixStar Studios (Virginia Beach, Virginia)

=== Personnel ===
- Who Is Fancy – vocals, songwriter
- J.R. Rotem – bass, drums, horns, keyboards, percussion, piano, production, songwriter
- Jason Gantt – songwriter
- Bob DiPiero – songwriter
- Ariana Grande – vocals
- Meghan Trainor – vocals
- Samuel Kalandjian – recording, engineering
- Serban Ghenea – mixing
- John Hanes – mixing

== Charts ==
Weekly chart positions for "Boys Like You"
Chart (2015–16)	Peak position
Czech Republic Singles Digital (ČNS IFPI)	84
Netherlands (Single Top 100)	89
New Zealand (Recorded Music NZ)	26
Poland Airplay (ZPAV)	47
Slovakia Singles Digital (ČNS IFPI)	89
US Bubbling Under Hot 100 (Billboard)	18

== Certifications ==
Certification for "Boys Like You"
Region	Certification	Certified units/sales
New Zealand (RMNZ)	Gold	7,500^{*}
^{*} Sales figures based on certification alone.

== Release history ==
Release dates and format(s) for "Boys Like You"
Region	Date	Format(s)	Label	Ref.
Various	November 23, 2015	Digital download; streaming	Republic	
United States	December 1, 2015	Contemporary hit radio	Republic	
