= Fancy Hagood =

American songwriter

Jake Hagood
- Born: Jake Hagood; March 29, 1991 (age 35)
- Origin: Bentonville, Arkansas
- Genres: Pop, Country
- Occupations: Singer; songwriter
- Years active: 2015–present
- Labels: Silent; Republic; BMLG
- Website: www.fancyhagood.com

Jake Hagood (born March 29, 1991), known professionally as Fancy Hagood and formerly known as Who Is Fancy, is an American singer. He co-signed with Scooter Braun and Scott Borchetta on Big Machine Label Group and Dr. Luke on Prescription Songs. His single "Goodbye" was released in early 2015, peaking at number 29 on the Billboard Mainstream Top 40 chart. Fancy was presented at the iHeartMedia Music Summit, although his identity was kept secret.

== Early life ==
Jake Hagood was born March 29, 1991, in Bentonville, Arkansas. He taught himself to play piano at age eleven. He grew up listening to Christian and Country music. After finishing high school in Arkansas, Hagood moved to Nashville, Tennessee to attend Trevecca Nazarene University. The name, "Fancy", was a nickname given to him by coworkers at Forever 21 during this time.

While attending university, Hagood wrote original music and performed around the Nashville area. He left the university after being discovered by producers Scooter Braun, Scott Borchetta, and Dr. Luke. Hagood is openly gay.

== Career ==
Beginning in January 2015, Hagood, his management team, and his record label, built a viral campaign around the singer and his debut single "Goodbye". The single was released without revealing the person behind the "Fancy" pseudonym. A series of pseudo-music videos and a lyric-only clip were viewed more than 4 million times on YouTube, and with early radio support from stations like New York's Z100, the song reached number 29 on the Billboard Mainstream Top 40 chart, number 48 on the Billboard Digital Songs chart, and number 98 on the Billboard Hot 100. Three music videos for the single were released, featuring three different actors lip-syncing to the song. Each video dealt with themes like gender identity and body positivity. A fourth music video featuring the performer himself in the same setting was filmed but never released.

In an interview with USA Today, Hagood said that one of motivations behind the campaign was for people to "know [his] art before they knew [him]". However, the concept met with a mixed response from some of Hagood's friends, including pop singer Meghan Trainor, who says she was vocally against it from the start. "I felt like you're hiding this guy," she told The Canadian Press. "What I loved about (Who is Fancy) was his appearance. He's this bubbly, happy person ... he has the confidence, he has everything, and they just — I don't like what they did."

Hagood finally revealed his identity on April 7, 2015, in an appearance on The Tonight Show Starring Jimmy Fallon.

To promote his second single "Boys like You", Who Is Fancy performed with collaborators Meghan Trainor and Ariana Grande on Dancing with the Stars on January 23, 2016.

After "Boys Like You" failed to perform on the charts, Hagood parted ways with manager Braun and Republic. In an interview with The Canadian Press, he said that he hoped to relaunch his career in summer 2016.

In 2016, Hagood was featured on Clean/Photograph, a Taylor Swift and Ed Sheeran mashup by Nashville singer-songwriter Louisa Wendorff. The mashup received good reviews, and was featured in articles on Billboard, Seventeen, and others.

He later returned to Nashville to re-evaluate his career, taking on the new stage name Fancy Hagood and incorporating new genres such as country, confessional pop, and glam rock to his music.

In July 2020, he released his first single under the new moniker, titled "Don't Blink."

Follow-up singles that year included "Another Lover Says" "The Same Thing" and "Forest." Three more singles "Mr. Atlanta" "Good Man" and "Southern Curiosity" were released in 2021 ahead of his upcoming album.

His debut album Southern Curiosity was released on April 9, 2021.

After the release of his album, Hagood released a couple of collaborations with Devon Gilfillian ("Let Me Be" in 2021), Abby Anderson ("Where Did All the Cowboys Go?" in 2022) and Kacey Musgraves ("Blue Dream Baby" in 2022) as well as a solo single "Bored" (in 2022).

Hagood reflected on his experience with a major label, and how they softened his gay persona: "It was everyone wanting to see me win, and they were like, 'Well, maybe you can't win if you're this (type of person),'" he says. "But maybe I could, you know what I mean?"

In late 2023, Elton John gave praise to Fancy, calling him a "hoot" on Elton's Apple Music 1 Rocket Hour, identifying Fancy's rise as a country music star.

== Concert tours ==
Hagood has opened for both Meghan Trainor's MTrain Tour and Ariana Grande's The Honeymoon Tour.

He opened for Elle King on her "Drunk And I Don't Wanna Go Home" tour in 2022.

== Discography ==
=== Albums ===
• Southern Curiosity (April 9, 2021)
• American Spirt (October 25, 2024)

=== Singles ===
List of singles, with selected chart positions and certifications
Title	Year	Peak chart positions					Certifications	Album
Title	Year	US	US Pop	NLD	NZ	POL	Certifications	Album
"Goodbye"	2015	98	29	—	—	—		Non-album singles
"Boys Like You" (featuring Meghan Trainor and Ariana Grande)	2015	— (Note: "Boys Like You" did not enter the Billboard Hot 100, but peaked at number 18 on the Bubbling Under Hot 100 Singles chart.)	—	89	26	47	RMNZ: Gold	Non-album singles
"Don't Blink"	2020	—	—	—	—	—		Southern Curiosity
"Another Lover Says"	2020	—	—	—	—	—		Southern Curiosity
"The Same Thing"	2020	—	—	—	—	—		Southern Curiosity
"Forest"	2020	—	—	—	—	—		Southern Curiosity
"Mr. Atlanta"	2021	—	—	—	—	—		Southern Curiosity
"Good Man"	2021	—	—	—	—	—		Southern Curiosity
"Southern Curiosity"	2021	—	—	—	—	—		Southern Curiosity
"Let Me Be" (with Devon Gilfillian)	2021	—	—	—	—	—		Non-album singles
"Bored"	2022	—	—	—	—	—		Non-album singles
"Where Did All the Cowboys Go?" (with Abby Anderson)	2022	—	—	—	—	—		Non-album singles
"Blue Dream Baby" (with Kacey Musgraves)	2022	—	—	—	—	—		Non-album singles
"—" denotes items which were not released in that country or failed to chart.

== Music videos ==
- "Goodbye"
- "Boys Like You"
- "The Same Thing"
- "Forest"
- "Good Man"
- "Southern Curiosity"
- "Bored"
- "Blue Dream Baby"
