= List of songs recorded by Ariana Grande =

Songs by American singer

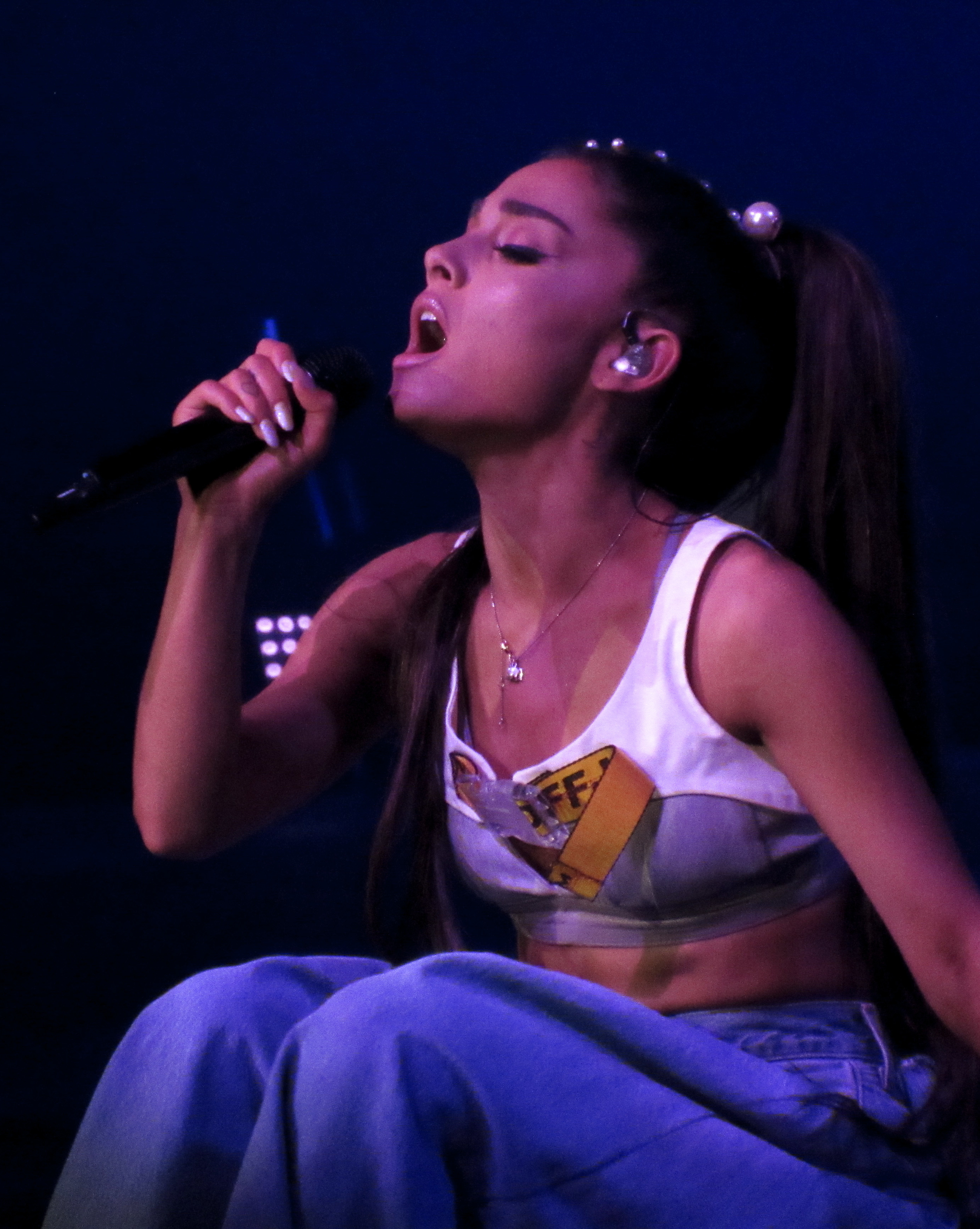
Grande at the SNHU Arena in 2017

American singer, songwriter, and actress Ariana Grande's music career began in 2008, when she contributed vocals to the cast recording of the musical 13. She subsequently went on to contribute to the soundtrack albums of the Nickelodeon TV sitcom Victorious, in which she also starred from 2010 to 2013. Three soundtrack albums were released between 2011 and 2012. In 2011, Grande also began to work as an independent artist outside of television, releasing "Put Your Hearts Up", a bubblegum pop song, the same year. Retrospectively, Grande has expressed dissatisfaction with the song, claiming it to be inauthentic to her artistry, resulting in its removal from YouTube. Following this, Republic Records granted Grande more creative control over the production of her debut album.

Yours Truly was released in September 2013. It was preceded by the release of her debut single, a R&B song called "The Way" featuring Mac Miller. The song was written by Miller, Harmony Samuels, Amber Streeter, Al Sherrod Lambert, Brenda Russell and American recording artist Jordin Sparks. Follow-up singles included the 1990s-R&B-influenced "Baby I", and "Right There" featuring Big Sean, which Grande stated served as a sequel to "The Way". Grande worked with Babyface on the album's opener "Honeymoon Avenue" and recorded a duet with Nathan Sykes called "Almost Is Never Enough". Christmas Kisses, Grande's first extended play, was released in December 2013. The EP, which consisted of four songs, was primarily Christmas music, and featured a collaboration with Elizabeth Gillies.

Grande's second studio album, My Everything, was released in August 2014. The lead single, "Problem" featured Iggy Azalea and Big Sean (uncredited) and incorporated elements of jazz and funk. "Break Free" is an EDM song produced by Zedd, which Grande considered experimental for her as it deviated from her usual pop-R&B styles. "Break Your Heart Right Back", featuring Childish Gambino, utilized two samples: "Mo Money Mo Problems" by The Notorious B.I.G. and "I'm Coming Out" by Diana Ross. Other contributing songwriters and producers on My Everything included Ryan Tedder and David Guetta, who composed "One Last Time", and Harry Styles former member of British boyband One Direction, who co-wrote "Just a Little Bit of Your Heart". In November 2014, Grande was featured on Major Lazer's song "All My Love", which was included on the soundtrack to the film The Hunger Games: Mockingjay – Part 1 (2014). The same month, Grande released a Christmas song titled "Santa Tell Me".

Grande's third studio album Dangerous Woman, was released in May 2016. Initially titled Moonlight, development on the album began in 2015. The album's intended lead single "Focus" was released in October 2015. It was ultimately scrapped from the record, although the song would later serve as a bonus track on the Japanese deluxe edition. Grande replaced it with the title track, which incorporated an arena rock chorus and a guitar solo during its bridge, followed by "Into You" and "Side to Side", featuring Nicki Minaj, a dancehall and reggae-pop song. Promotional singles included "Be Alright" and "Let Me Love You" featuring Lil Wayne. The album also featured collaborations with Macy Gray and Future, who was featured on the fourth and final single "Everyday", released in January 2017.

Grande's fourth studio album, Sweetener, was released in August 2018 to universal acclaim. The lead single, "No Tears Left to Cry", which incorporated a UK garage beat, was released in April 2018 and was followed by "God Is a Woman", a predominantly mid-tempo pop song with trap elements, in July of the same year. Grande also teamed up again with Minaj on "The Light Is Coming", which served as the album's sole promotional single in June. "Breathin", a dance-pop song containing influences of synth-pop was released as the third single in September. Sonically, Sweetener was considered highly experimental for Grande, consisting primarily of pop, R&B, and trap songs, with heavily incorporated elements of house, funk, neo soul and hip-hop.

Grande's fifth studio album, Thank U, Next, was released in February 2019. Co-writing all 12 of its tracks, Thank U, Next was considered Grande's most personal record up to that point. The album earned praise for its vulnerability and cohesiveness, while its songs heavily incorporated hip hop. The album spawned the international number-one hits "Thank U, Next", "7 Rings" and "Break Up With Your Girlfriend, I'm Bored". With this album, Grande opted to work on the album with collaborators with shared rapport, such as frequent contributors Victoria Monét, Max Martin, Ilya and Tommy Brown.

In October 2020, Grande released her sixth studio album Positions, which delved deeper into R&B whilst maintaining pop styles. For the album's production, Grande worked primarily with Brown, while also enlisting producers she had never worked with in her career, including London on da Track, Murda Beatz and Scott Storch. Collaborators include Doja Cat, The Weeknd and Ty Dolla Sign, with Megan Thee Stallion appearing on the deluxe edition. It spawned three singles; the title track, "34+35" and "POV". Recorded during the COVID-19 pandemic, Grande developed the album with focus on her vocals and to convey emotional healing.

After three years without releasing solo music, Grande released her seventh studio album Eternal Sunshine in March 2024. The album mainly consisted of her signature pop and R&B sound with added elements of dance music such as house and synth-pop. The lead single, "Yes, And?", is a pop-house song that was released in January 2024. The album spawned two more singles, "We Can't Be Friends (Wait for Your Love)", a synth-pop song released alongside the album, and "The Boy Is Mine", an R&B track with production echoing music of the 1990s which received a remix featuring Brandy and Monica.

== Songs ==
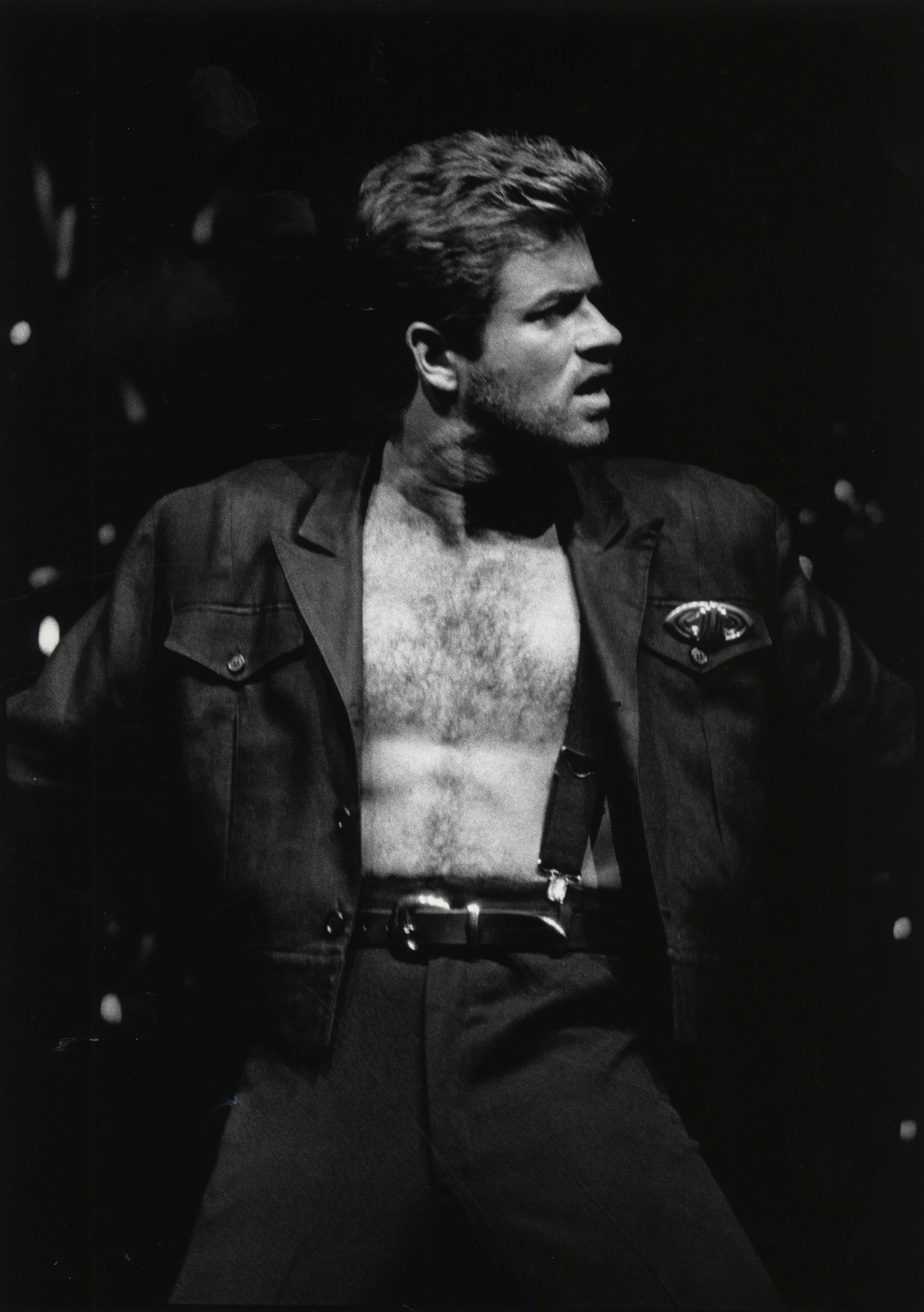
George Michael wrote "Last Christmas," which was covered by Grande.

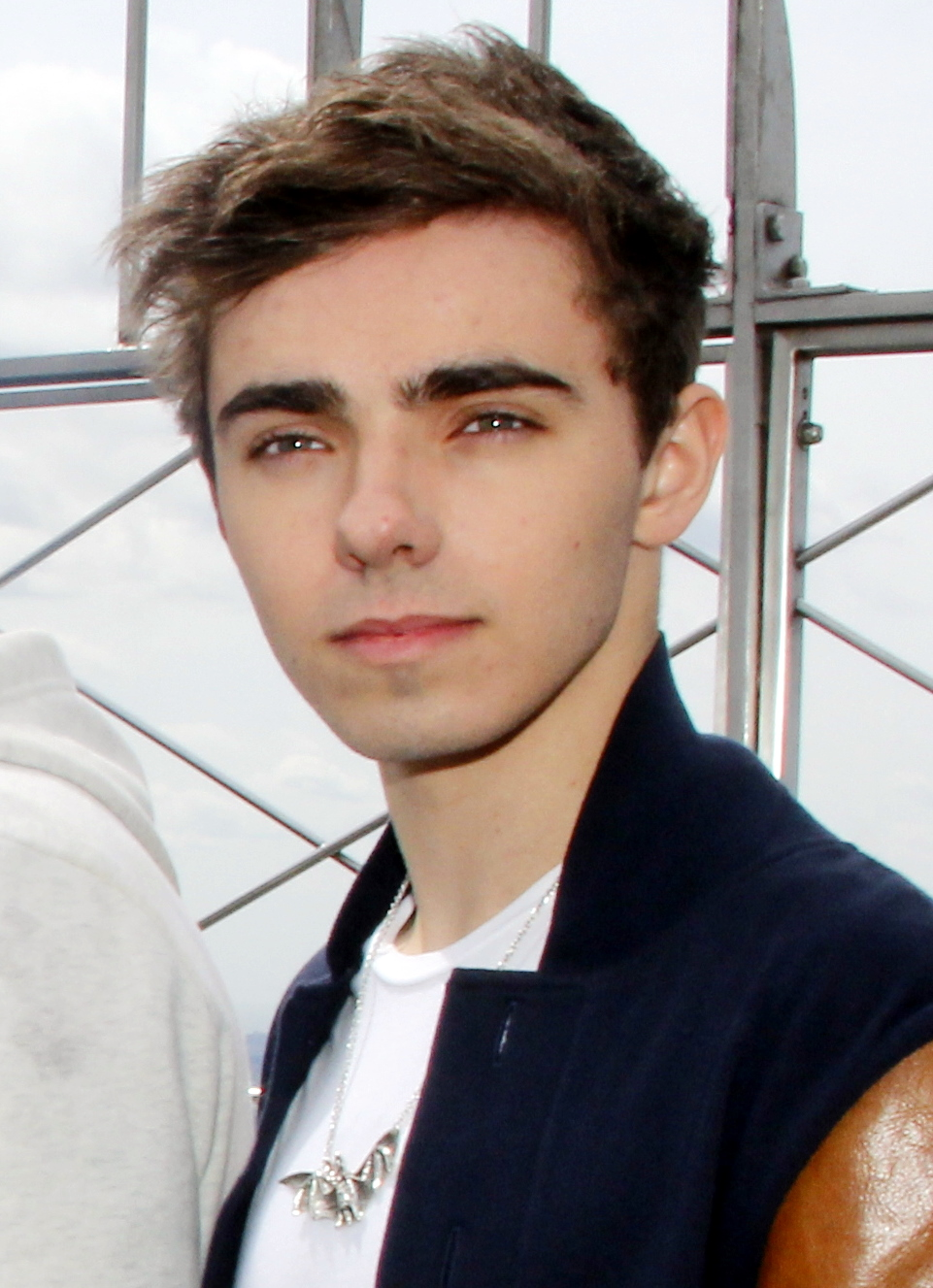
Nathan Sykes of British boyband The Wanted appears as a featured artist on "Almost Is Never Enough". Sykes later featured Grande on the reissued version of his single "Over and Over Again".

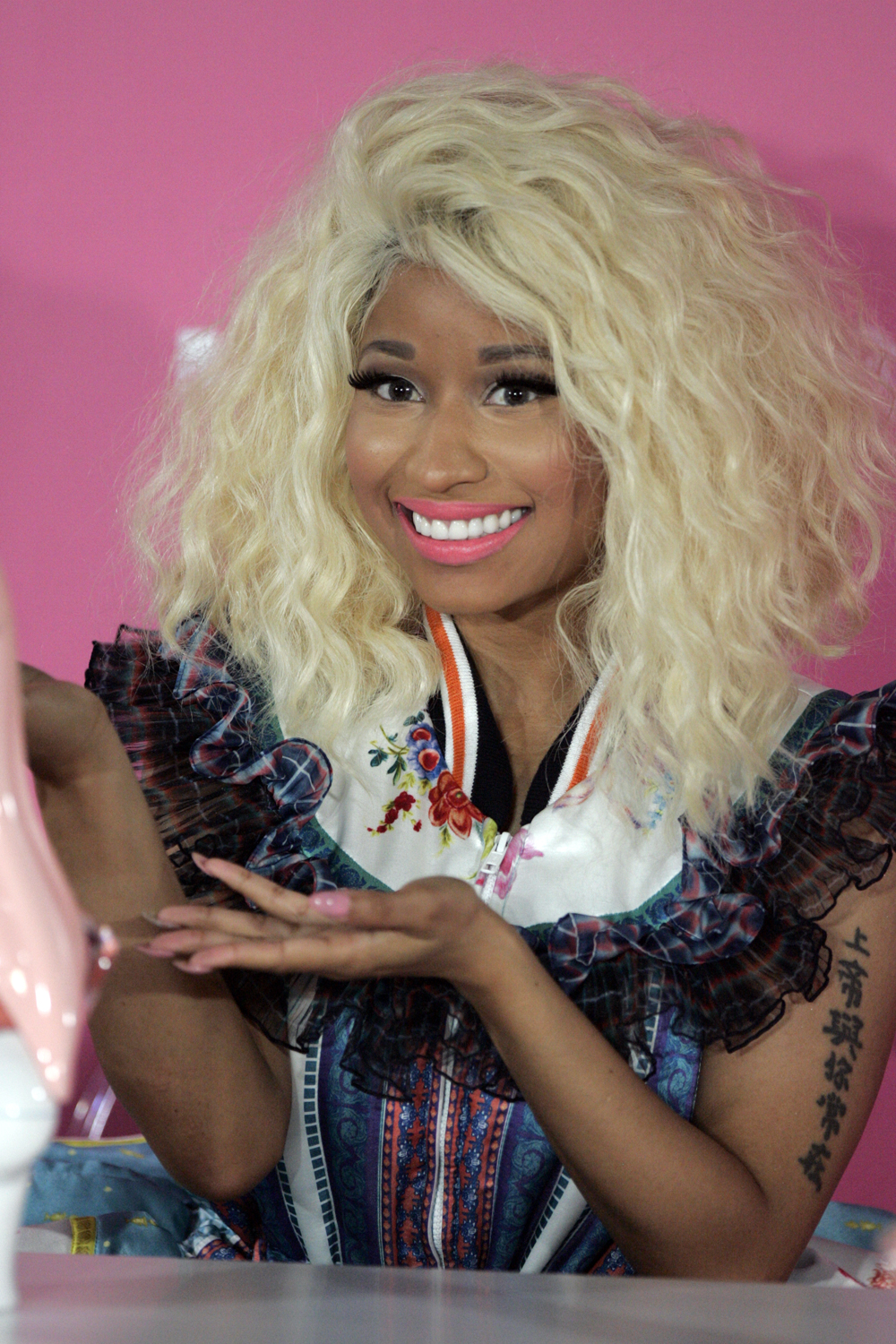
Nicki Minaj collaborated with Grande on "Bang Bang", "Side to Side", "The Light Is Coming" and "Bad to You". Grande also features on Minaj's song "Get on Your Knees" and "Bed".

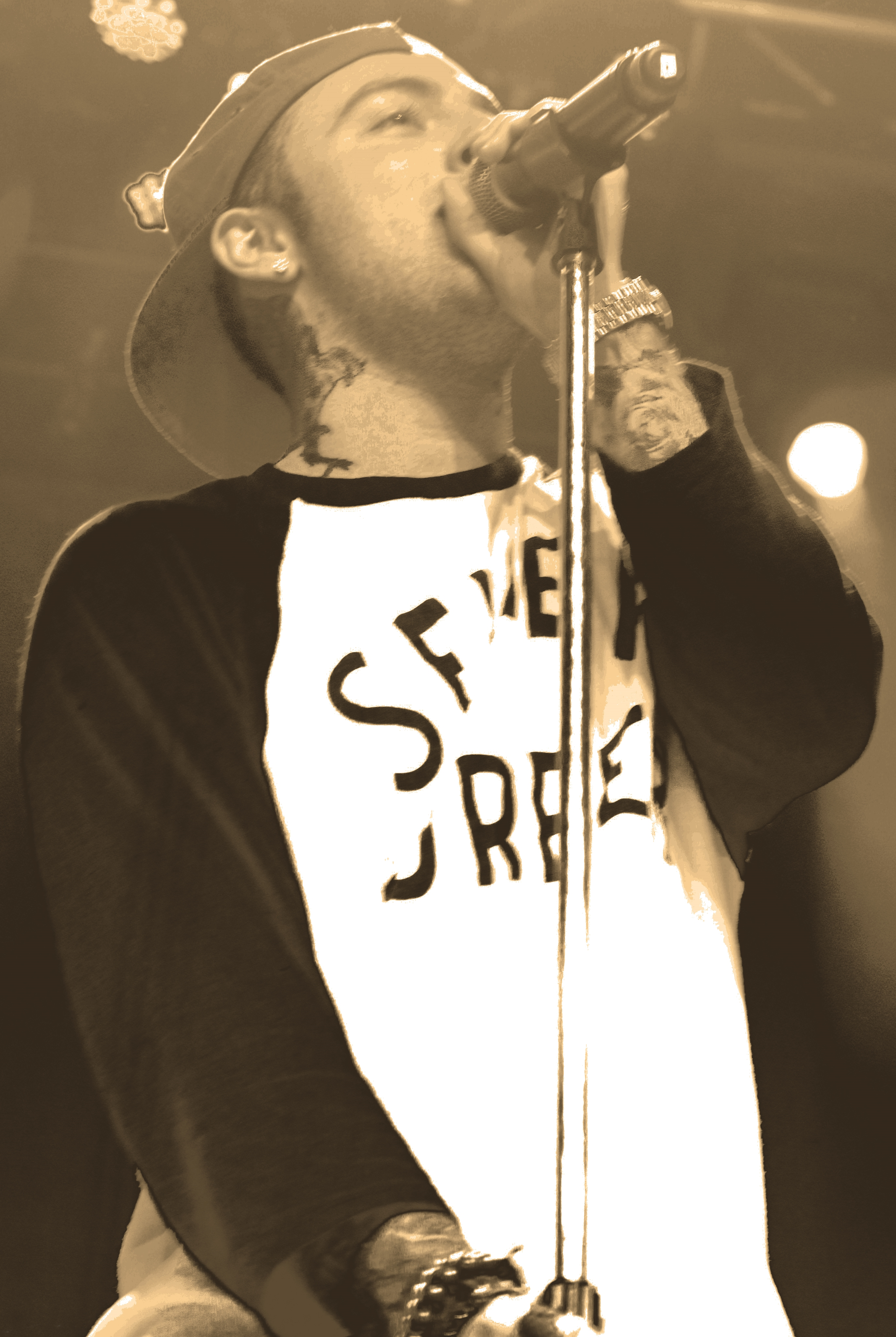
Rapper Mac Miller recorded three songs with Grande. He was first featured on her debut single "The Way", and again on the remix to her single "Into You". Miller later featured Grande on his song "My Favorite Part". The duo also covered "Baby, It's Cold Outside", with Miller using the name Larry Lovestein.

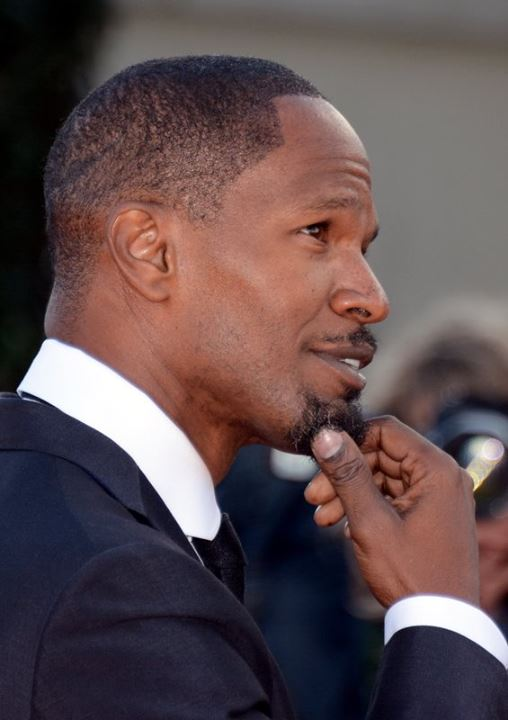
Jamie Foxx provided uncredited guest vocals on "Focus".

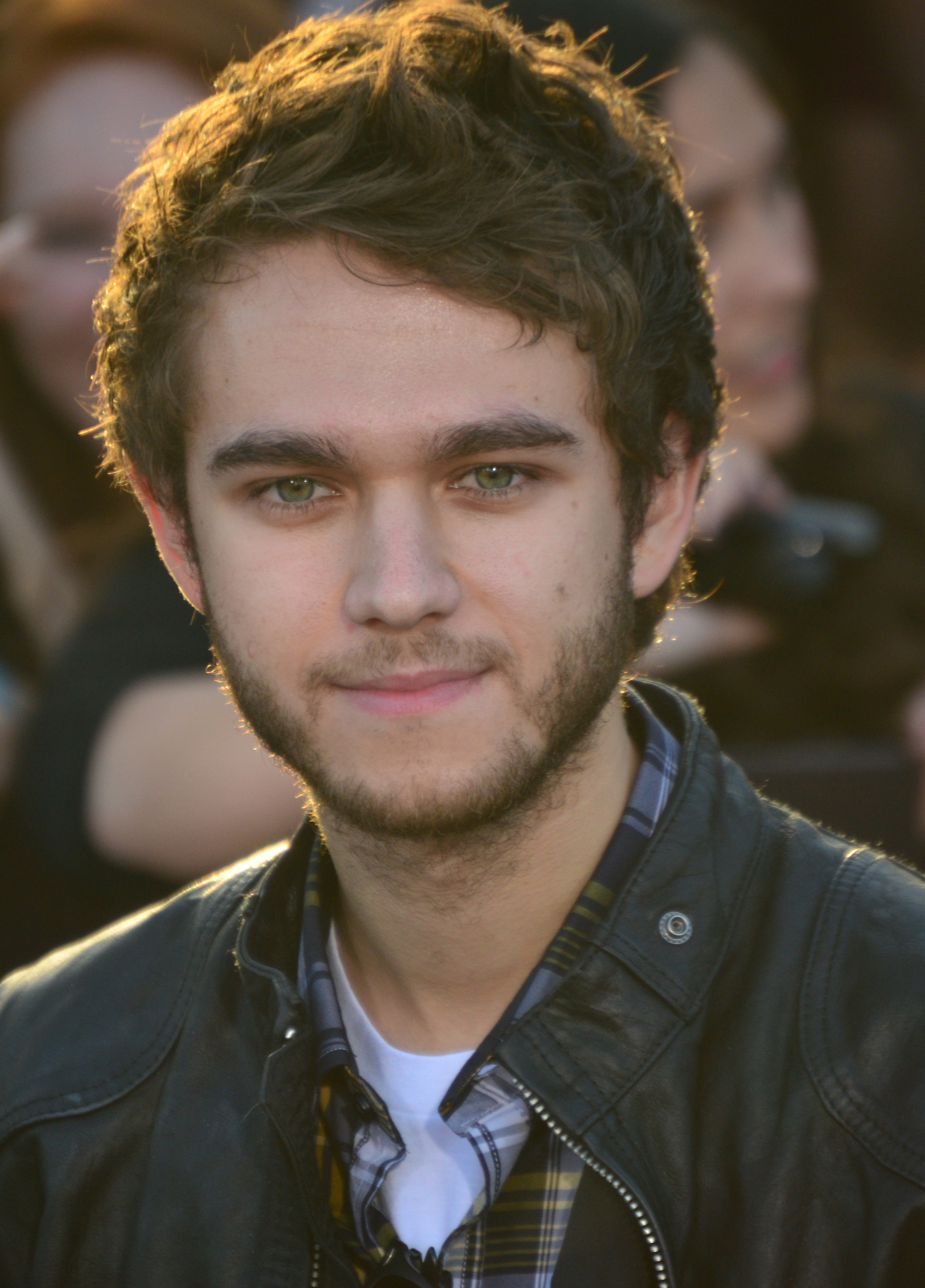
Zedd wrote and produced "Break Free" for Grande and appears as a featured artist.

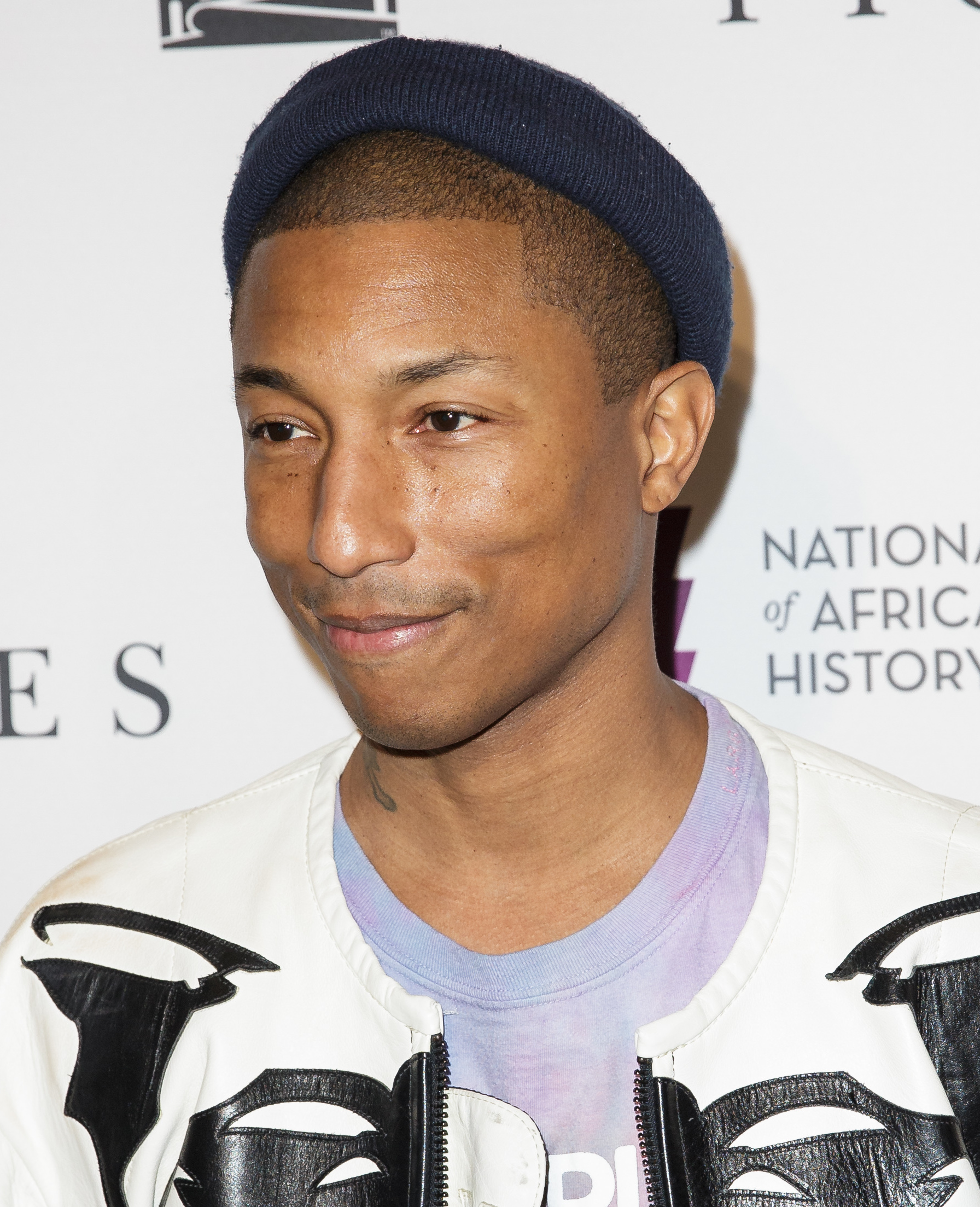
Pharrell Williams has written and produced songs for Grande's fourth studio album Sweetener. He also collaborated with her on two songs, "Heatstroke" by Calvin Harris, and "Blazed".

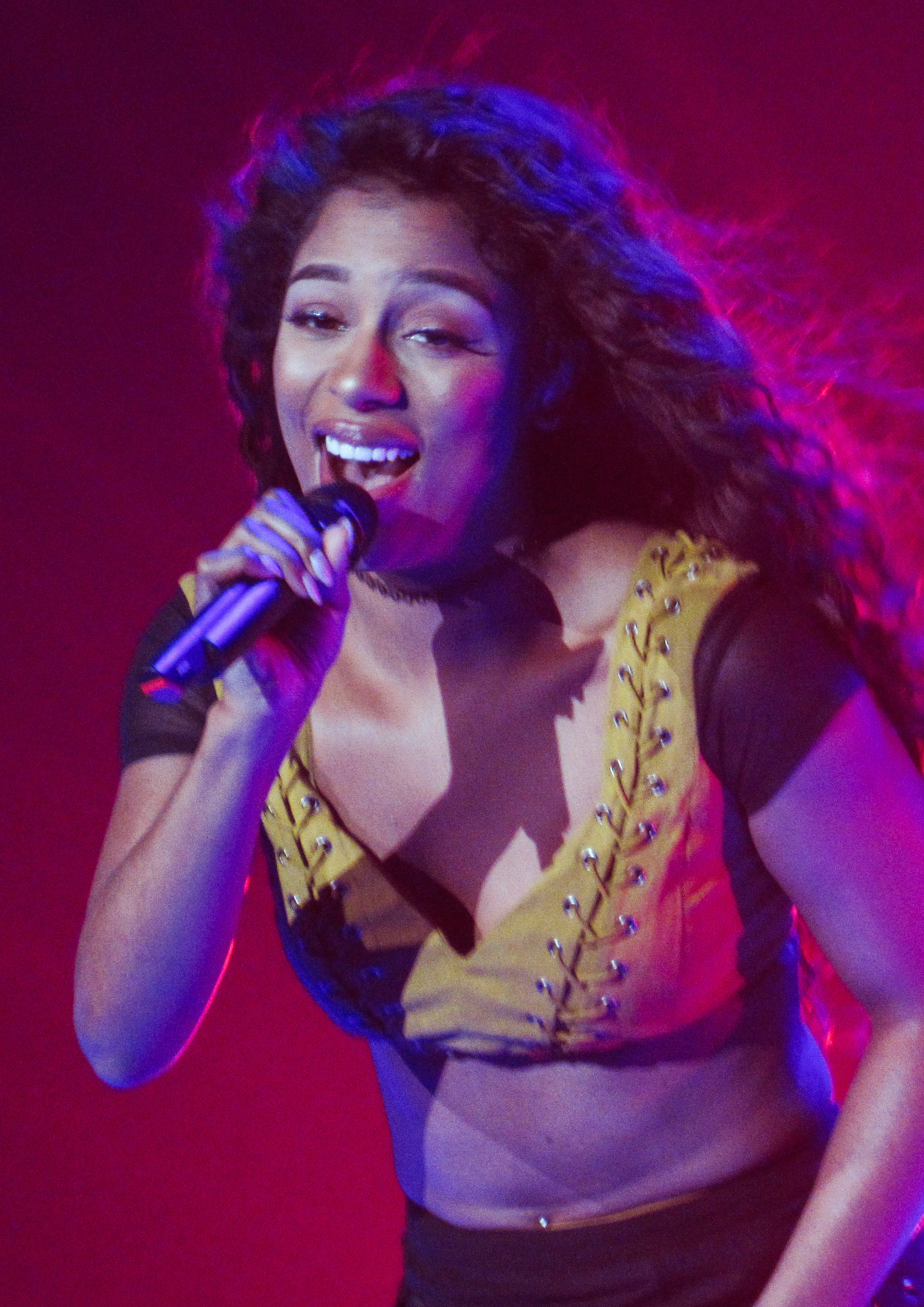
Victoria Monét co-wrote several of Grande's songs, especially those from Thank U, Next and Positions. She and Grande collaborated on "Better Days", "Monopoly" and "Got Her Own".

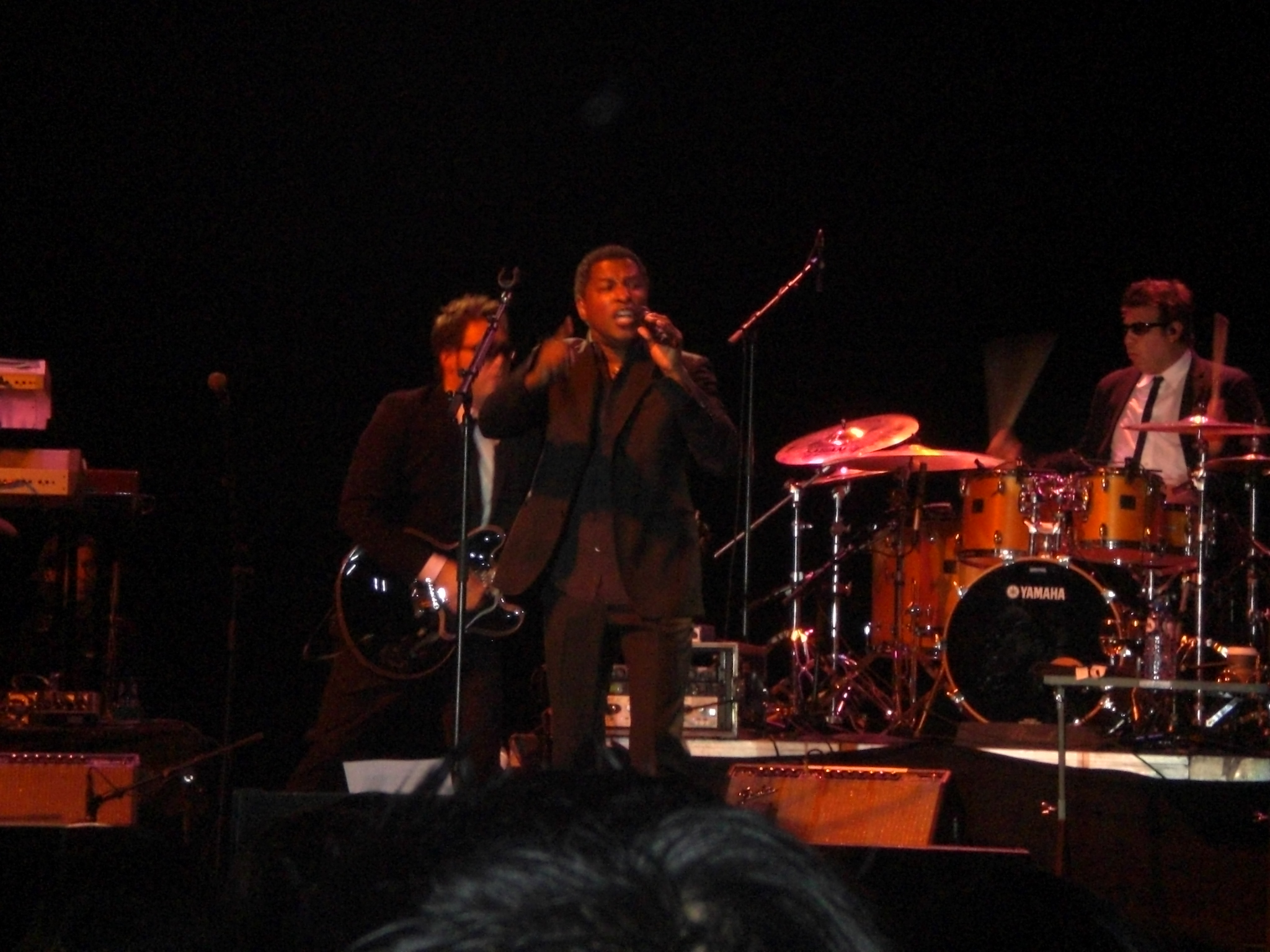
R&B music producer Kenneth "Babyface" Edmonds wrote and produced Grande's debut album, including her single "Baby I", and her Christmas EP, Christmas Kisses.

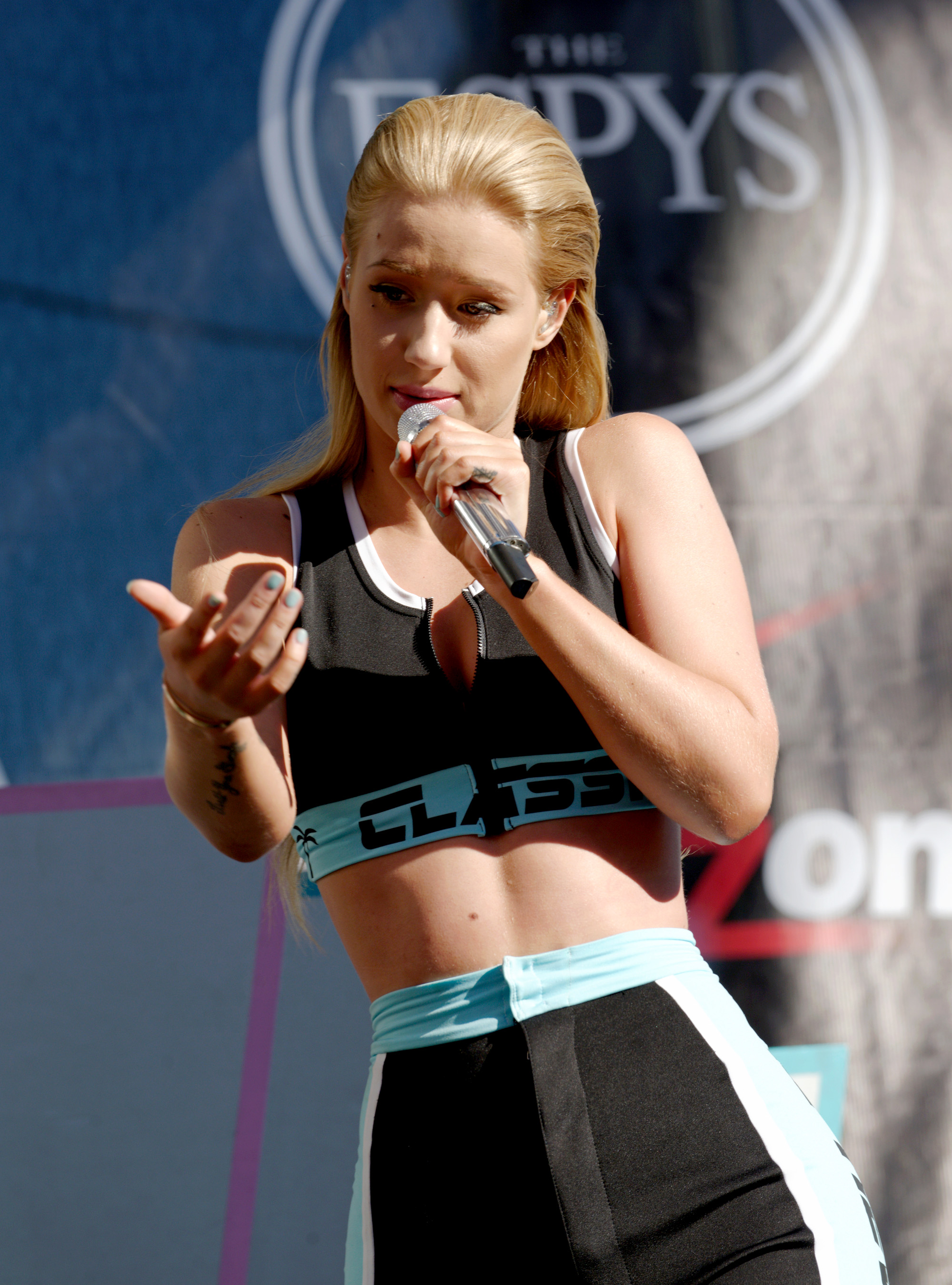
Iggy Azalea appears as a featured artist on "Problem".

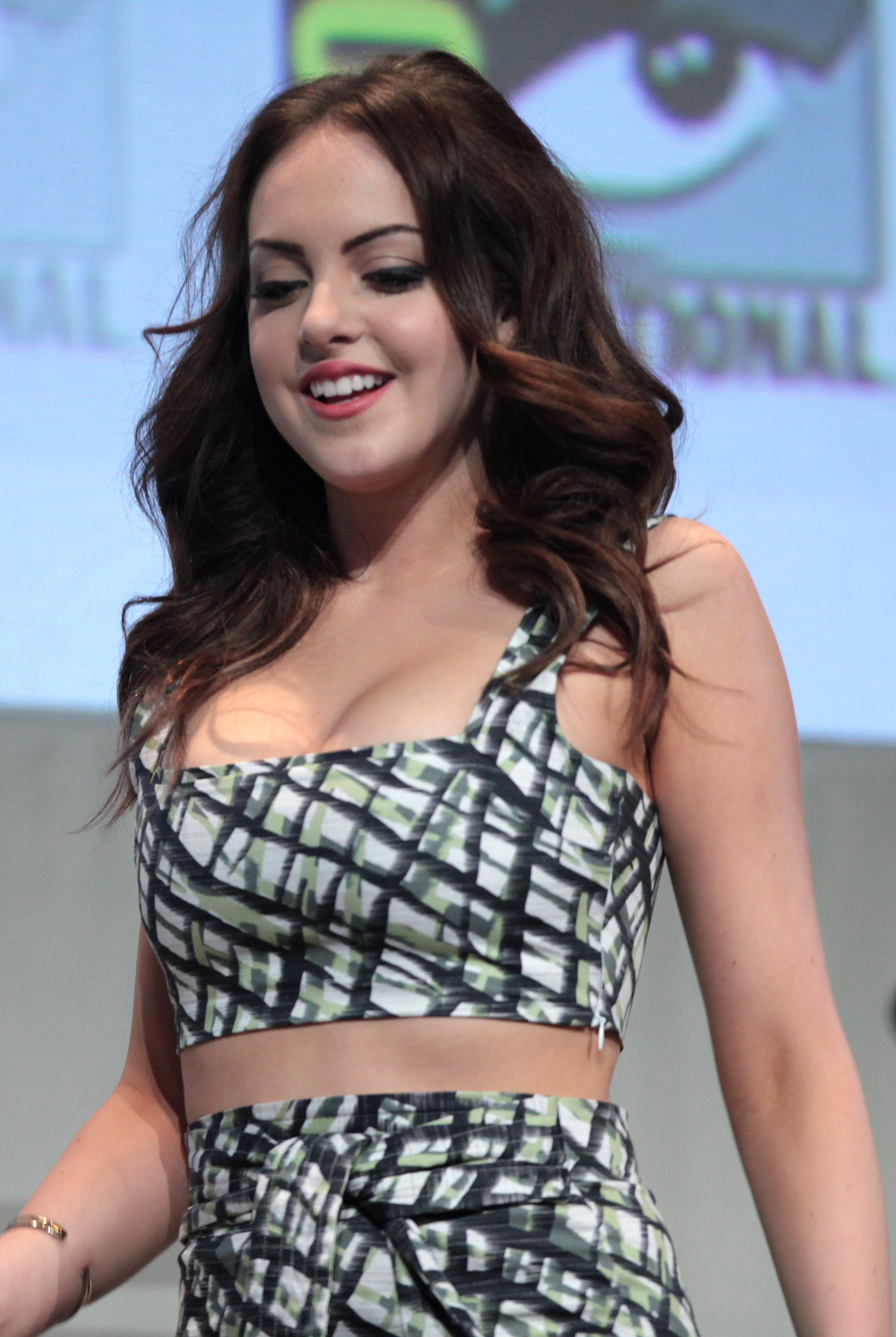
Elizabeth Gillies, Grande's personal friend, appeared in several songs with Grande, including those from the Victorious soundtrack, as well as their Broadway musical 13, and covered "Santa Baby".

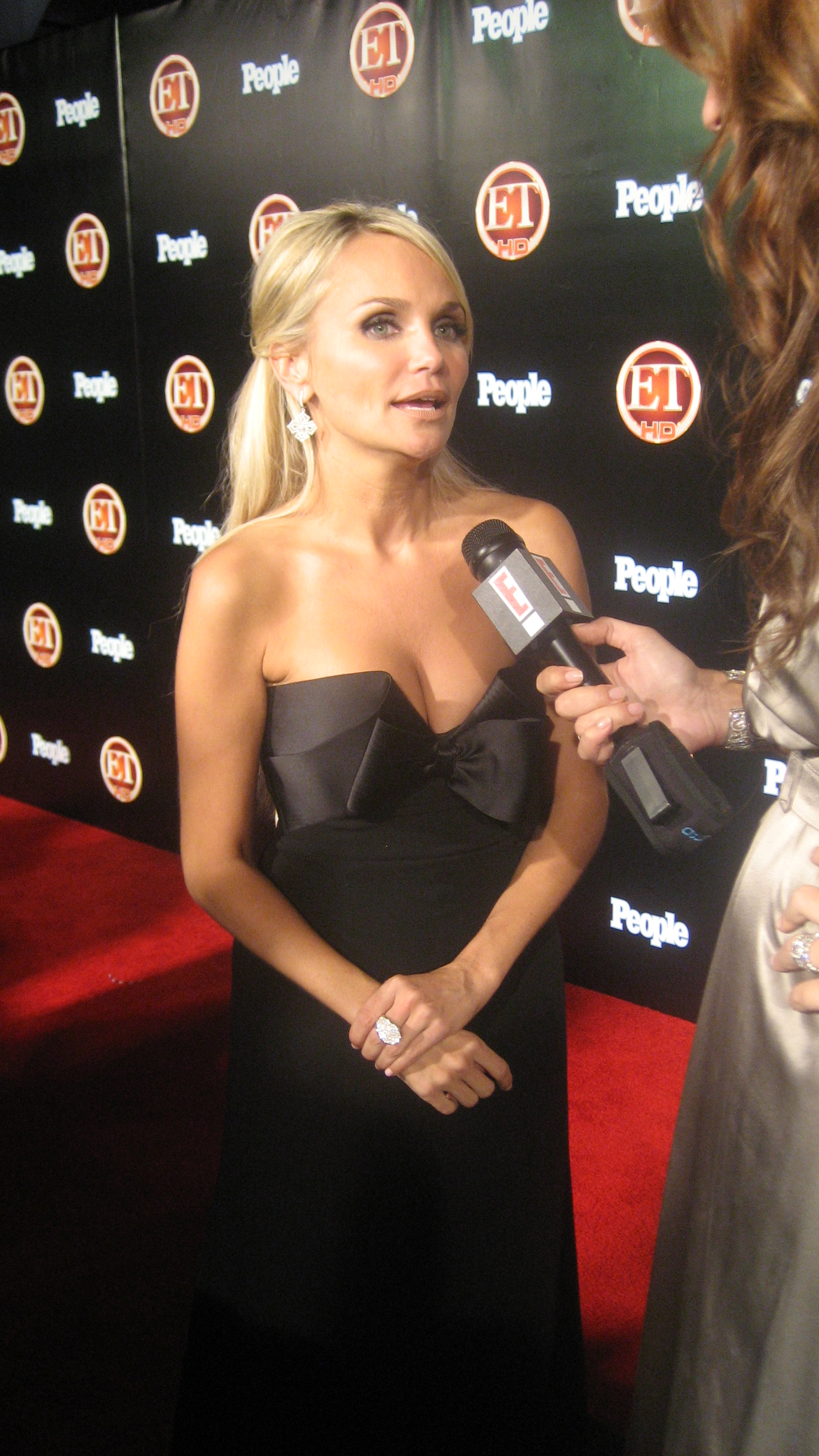
Broadway performer Kristin Chenoweth appeared on songs with Grande as part of the cast of Hairspray Live! in 2016. Chenoweth featured Grande on the cover of "You Don't Own Me" in 2019.

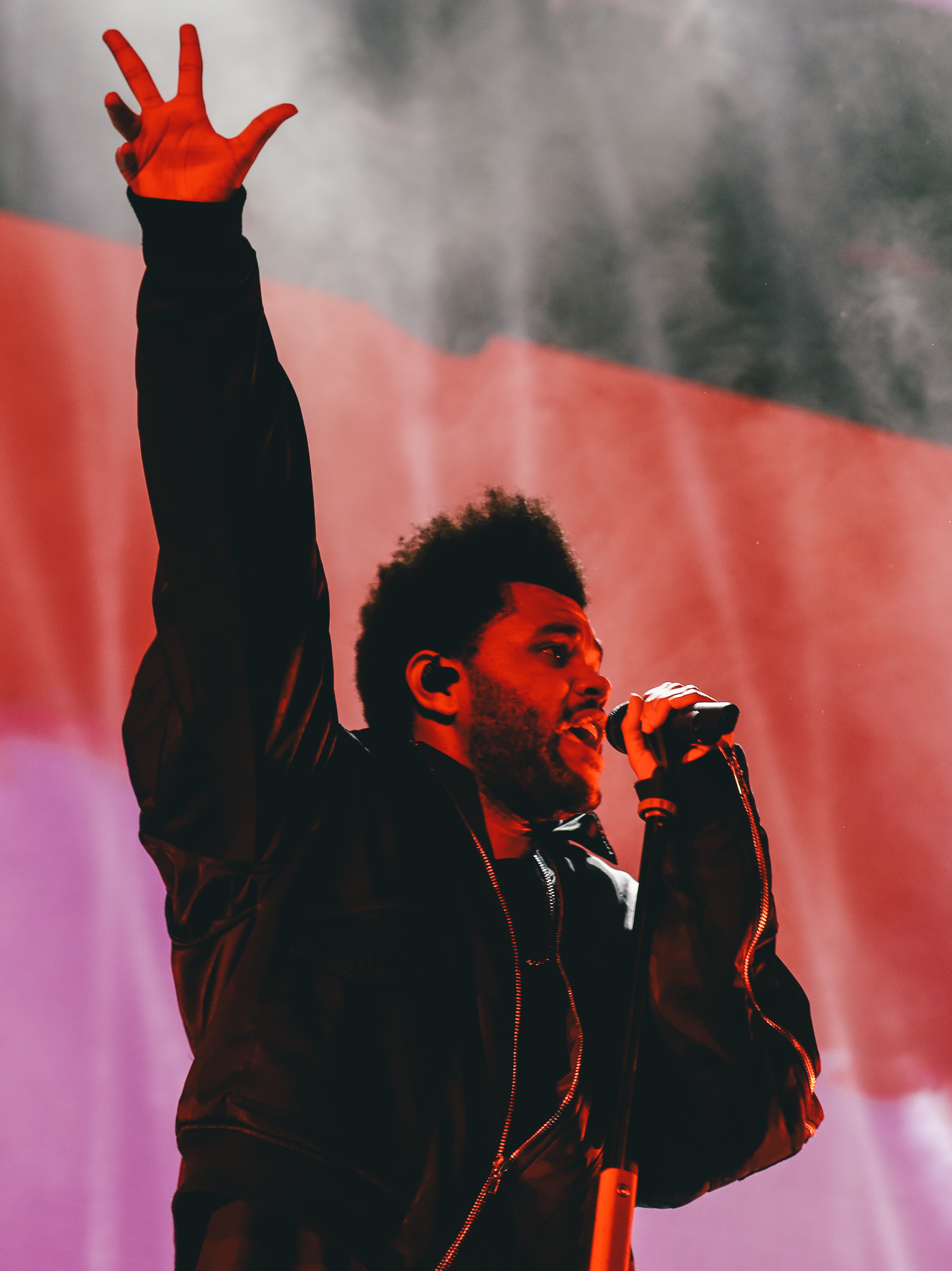
Grande and The Weeknd collaborated on four tracks: "Love Me Harder" in 2014, "Off the Table" in 2020, and the remixes of his singles "Save Your Tears" and "Die for You" in 2021 and 2023, respectively; both the remixes peaked at number one on the Billboard Hot 100.

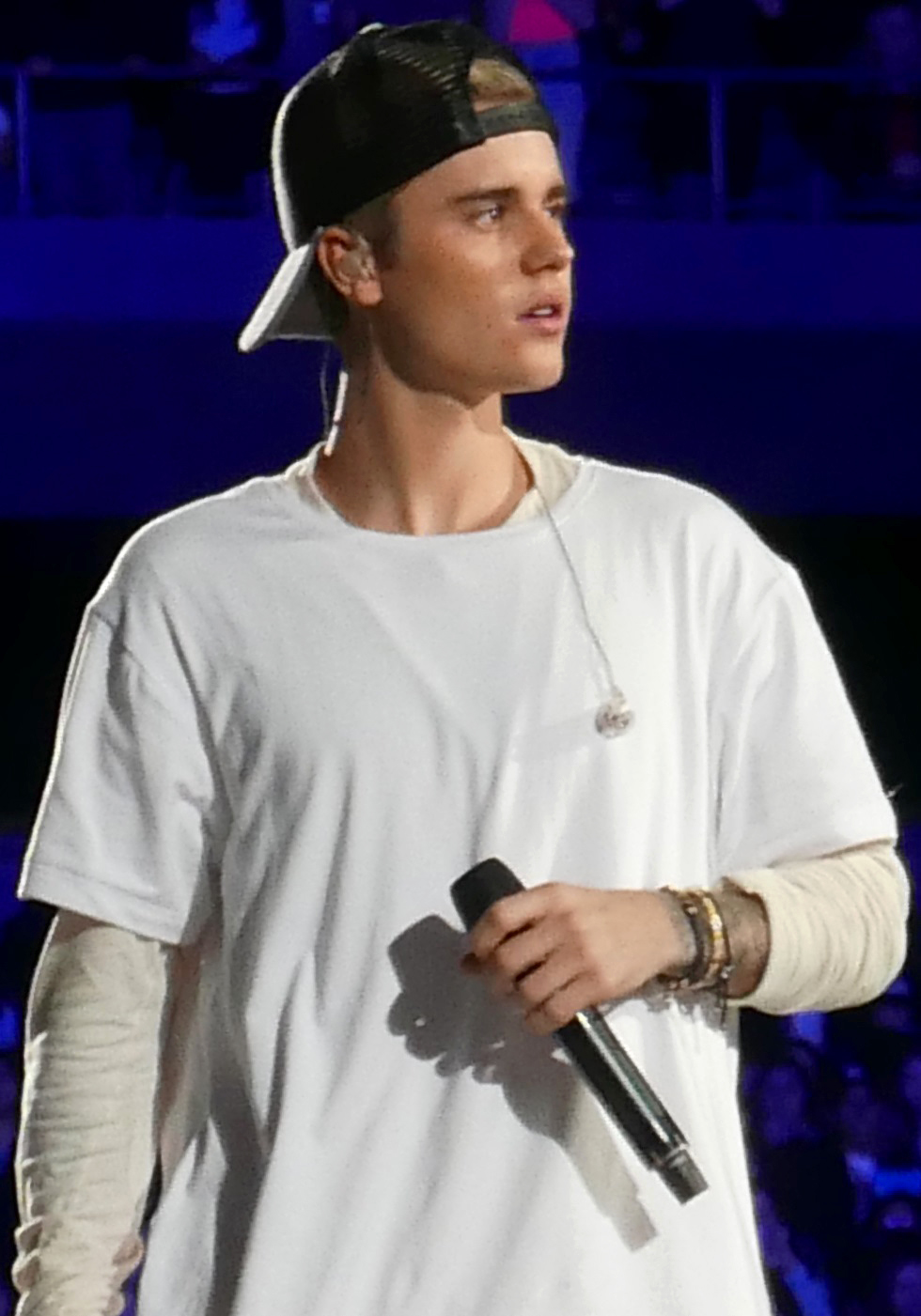
Grande was featured on the remix of Justin Bieber's 2015 song "What Do You Mean?" and both of them collaborated again in 2020 on "Stuck with U". Both artists appeared on Lil Dicky's 2019 charity single, "Earth".

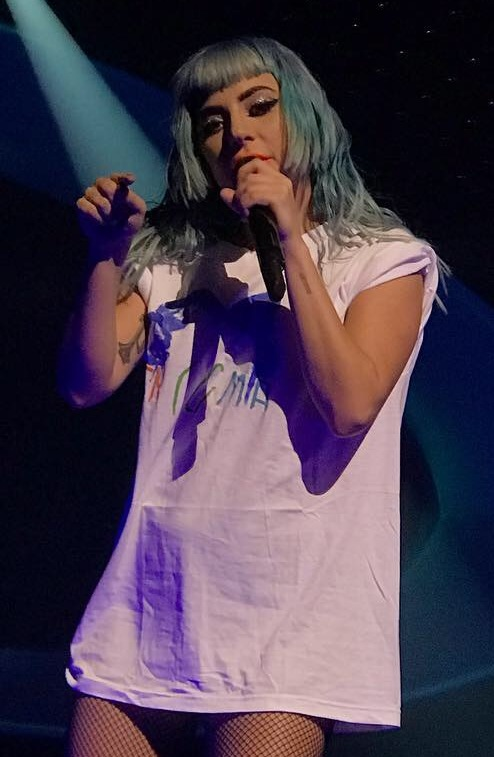
Grande collaborated with Lady Gaga on the song "Rain on Me" from Gaga's sixth studio album Chromatica.

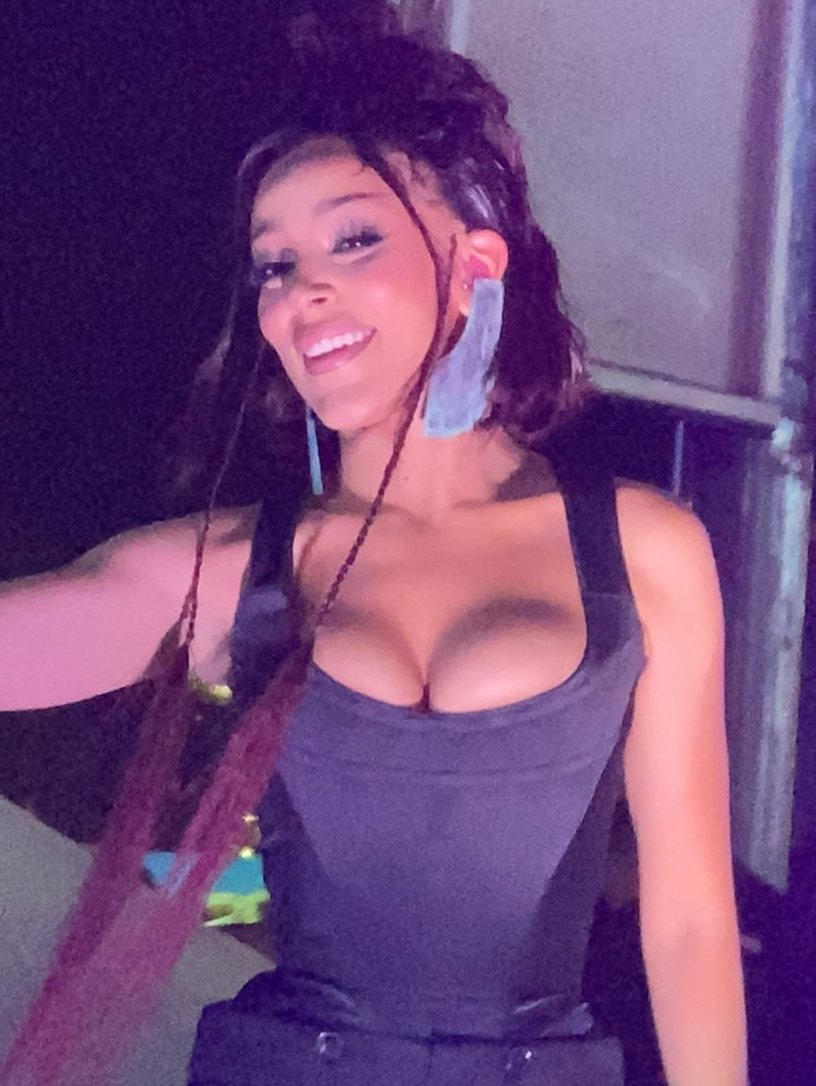
Rapper and singer Doja Cat collaborated with Grande on the remix to "34+35" and the song "Motive" from Positions. Grande is featured on "I Don't Do Drugs" from Cat's Planet Her.

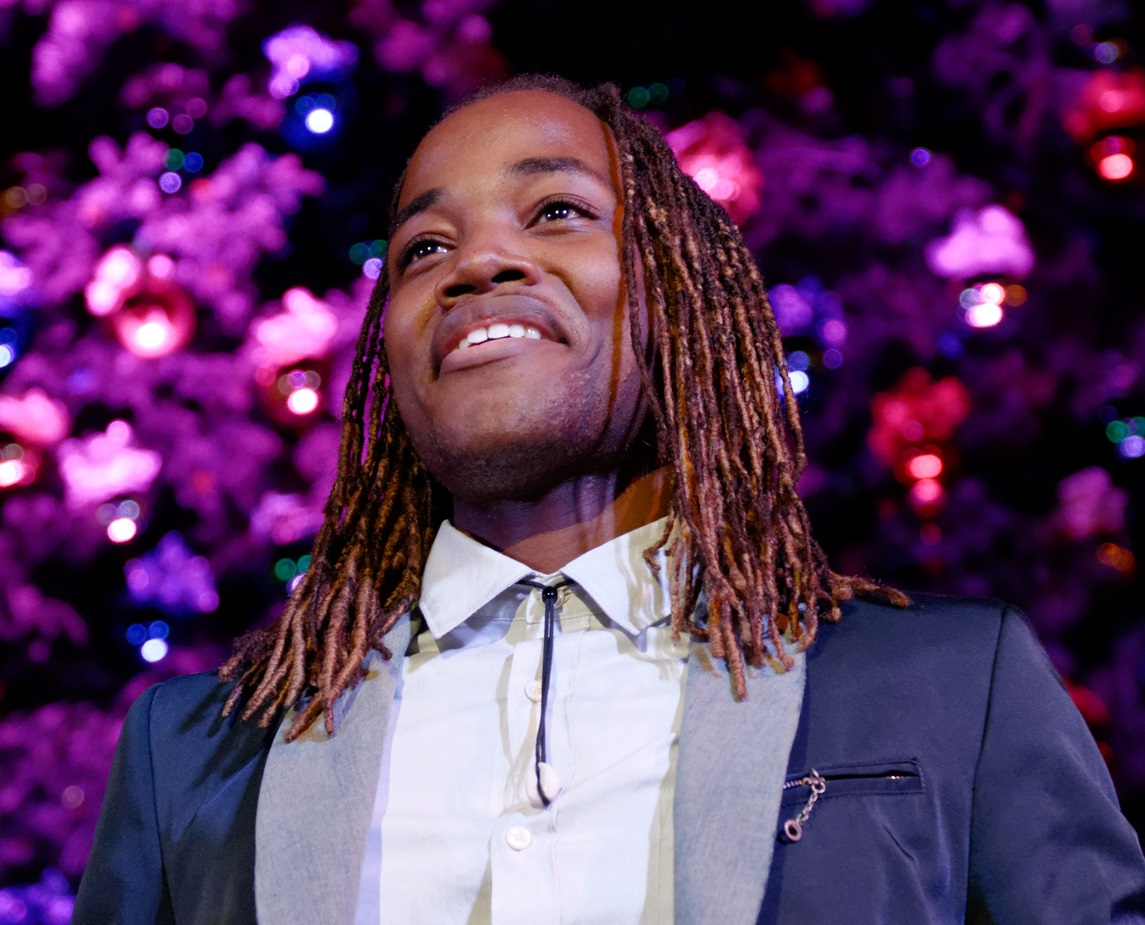
Grande's Victorious co-star Leon Thomas, helped to write and co-produce as part of the duo The Rascals on Grande's debut album Yours Truly, her Christmas EP Christmas Kisses and her sixth album Positions. The duo collaborated on a cover of "Take Care" for Thomas' debut mixtape Metro Hearts.

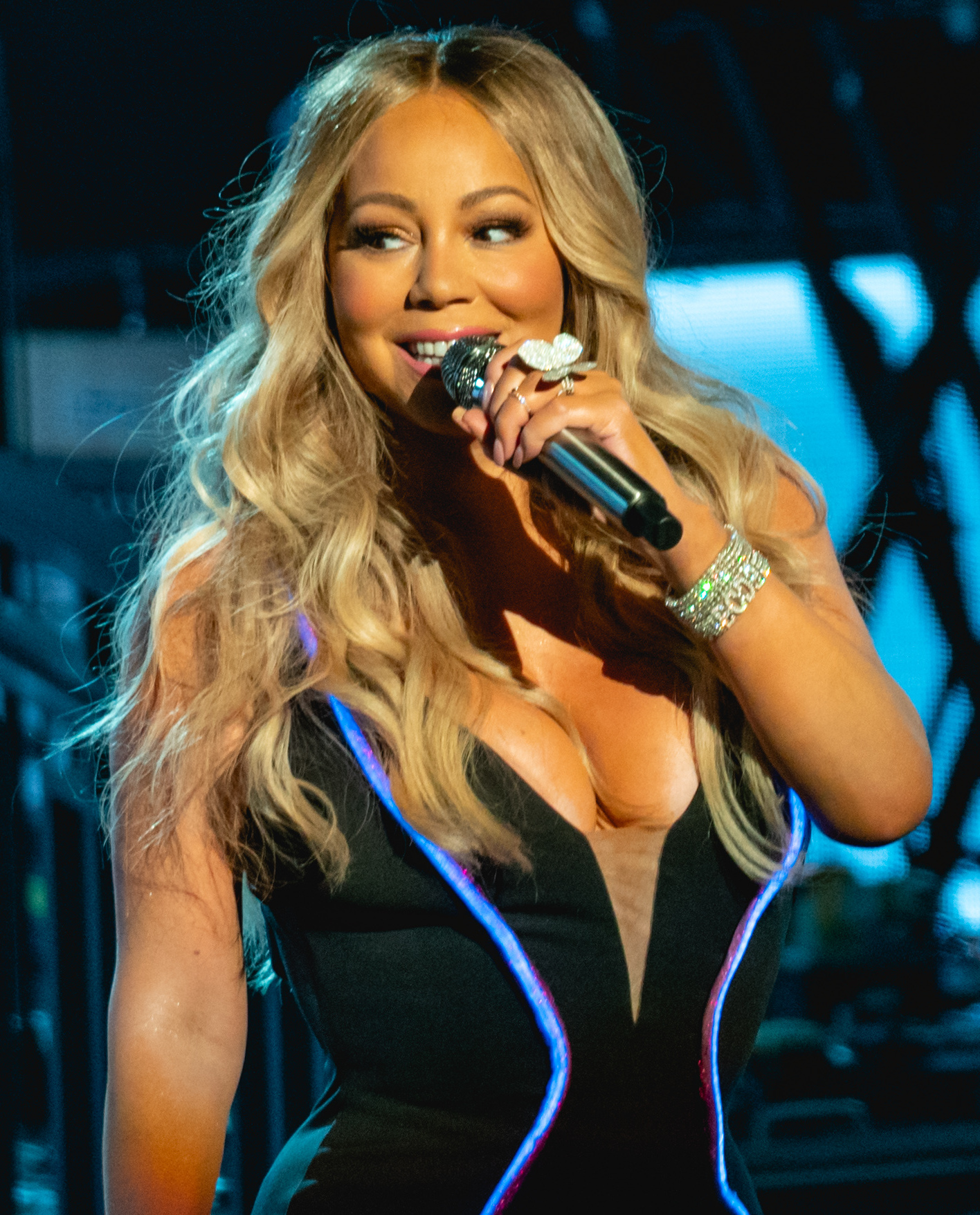
Mariah Carey, whom Grande had cited as her inspiration, and was widely compared to, performed a remix to Carey's Christmas single in 2020, "Oh Santa!". In return, Carey later appeared on the remix of Grande's song "Yes, And?" in 2024.

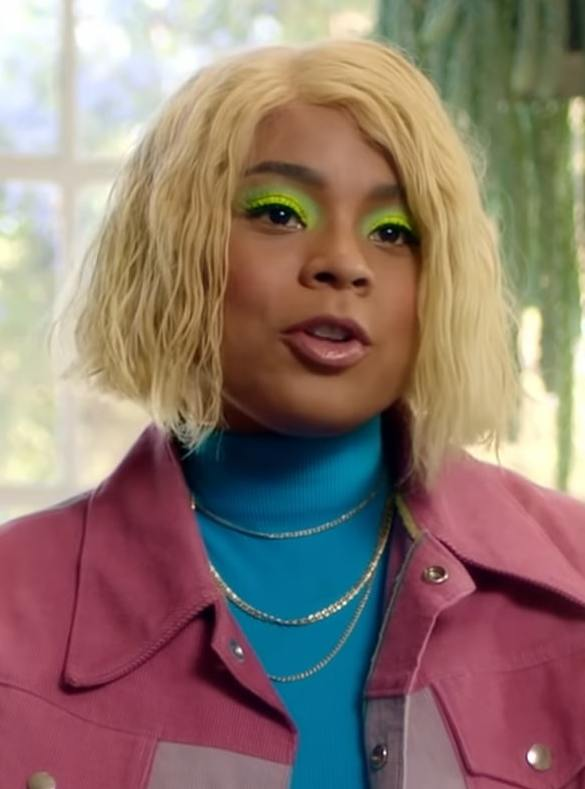
Singer-songwriter Tayla Parx wrote several songs with Grande, beginning with 2014's My Everything.

Key
†	Indicates single release
#	Indicates promotional single release

Songs recorded by Ariana Grande
Song name	Artist(s)	Writer(s)	Originating album	Year	Ref.
"5 Fingaz to the Face"	Victorious Cast	Allan Grigg; Leon Thomas III; Travis Garland	Victorious 2.0: More Music from the Hit TV Show	2012	
"7 Rings" †	Ariana Grande	Ariana Grande; Victoria Monét; Tayla Parx; Njomza Vitia; Kimberly Krysiuk; Tommy Brown; Michael Foster; Charles Anderson; Richard Rodgers; Oscar Hammerstein II	Thank U, Next	2019	
"7 Rings" (remix)	Ariana Grande featuring 2 Chainz	Ariana Grande; 2 Chainz; Victoria Monét; Tayla Parx; Njomza Vitia; Kimberly Krysiuk; Tommy Brown; Michael Foster; Charles Anderson; Richard Rodgers; Oscar Hammerstein II	Thank U, Next (Japanese Deluxe Edition)	2019	
"13 / Becoming a Man"	13 Original Broadway Cast	Jason Robert Brown	13 (Original Broadway Cast Recording)	2008	
"34+35" †	Ariana Grande	Ariana Grande; Tommy Brown; Steven Franks; Peter Lee Johnson; Tayla Parx; Victoria Monét; Scott Nicholson; Xavi; Albert Stanaj	Positions	2020	
"34+35" (remix) †	Ariana Grande featuring Doja Cat and Megan Thee Stallion	Ariana Grande; Tommy Brown; Steven Franks; Peter Lee Johnson; Tayla Parx; Victoria Monét; Scott Nicholson; Xavi; Albert Stanaj; Doja Cat; Megan Thee Stallion	Positions (Deluxe Edition)	2021	
"Adore" †	Cashmere Cat featuring Ariana Grande	Kenneth "Babyface" Edmonds; Jeremih Felton; Magnus August Høiberg; Benjamin Levin; Peder Losnegard; Ammar Malik; Daryl Simmons	Non-album single	2015	
"All My Love"	Major Lazer featuring Ariana Grande	Ella Yelich-O'Connor; Ariana Grande; Karen Marie Ørsted	The Hunger Games: Mockingjay, Part 1	2014	
"All My Love" (remix)	Major Lazer featuring Ariana Grande and Machel Montano	Thomas Pentz; Boaz de Jong; Philip Meckseper; Ella Yelich-O'Connor; Ariana Grande; Karen Marie Ørsted; Machel Montano; Gamal Doyle	Peace Is the Mission	2015	
"Almost Is Never Enough" #	Ariana Grande and Nathan Sykes	Harmony Samuels; H. "Carmen Reece" Culvar; Al Sherrod Lambert; Moses Ayo Samuels; Olaniyi Michael Akinkunm; Ariana Grande	Yours Truly	2013	
"Arturo Sandoval"	Arturo Sandoval and Pharrell Williams featuring Ariana Grande	Arturo Sandoval; Pharrell Williams	Ultimate Duets	2018	
"Baby I" †	Ariana Grande	Kenneth "Babyface" Edmonds; Antonio Dixon; Patrick "J. Que" Smith	Yours Truly	2013	
"Bad Decisions"	Ariana Grande	Ariana Grande; Max Martin; Savan Kotecha; Ilya Salmanzadeh	Dangerous Woman	2016	
"Bad Idea (Ariana Grande song)"	Ariana Grande	Ariana Grande; Max Martin; Ilya Salmanzadeh; Savan Kotecha	Thank U, Next	2019	
"Bad to You"	Ariana Grande, Normani and Nicki Minaj	Ariana Grande; Max Martin; Ilya Salmanzadeh; Savan Kotecha; Brandon "Bizzy" Hollemon; Danny Schofield	Charlie's Angels	2019	
"Bang Bang" †	Jessie J, Ariana Grande and Nicki Minaj	Max Martin; Rickard Göransson; Savan Kotecha; Onika Maraj	Sweet Talker and My Everything (Deluxe Edition)	2014	
"Be Alright" #	Ariana Grande	Tommy Brown; Victoria McCants; Nick Audino; Lewis Hughes; Khaled Rohaim; Willie Tafa; Ariana Grande	Dangerous Woman	2016	
"Be My Baby"	Ariana Grande featuring Cashmere Cat	Magnus August Høiberg; Theron Thomas; Timothy Thomas; Peder Losnegård	My Everything	2014	
"Beauty and the Beast" †	Ariana Grande and John Legend	Howard Ashman; Alan Menken	Beauty and the Beast: Original Motion Picture Soundtrack	2017	
"Bed" †	Nicki Minaj featuring Ariana Grande	Dwayne Chin-Quee; Gamal Lewis; Onika Maraj; Ariana Grande	Queen	2018	
"Best Mistake" #	Ariana Grande featuring Big Sean	Ariana Grande; Sean Anderson; Denisea "Blu June" Andrews; Brittany Coney; Dwane Weir II	My Everything	2014	
"Better Days"	Victoria Monét featuring Ariana Grande	Victoria McCants; Ariana Grande	Non-album single	2016	
"Better Left Unsaid"	Ariana Grande	Harmony Samuels; Courtney Harrell; Al Sherrod Lambert; Moses Ayo Samuels; Olaniyi Mich	Yours Truly	2013	
"Better Off"	Ariana Grande	Chauncey Hollis; Kim "Kaydence" Krysiuk; Brian Malik Baptiste; Tommy Brown; Ariana Grande	Sweetener	2018	
"Blazed"	Ariana Grande featuring Pharrell Williams	Pharrell Williams; Maxine Colon	Sweetener	2018	
"Bloodline"	Ariana Grande	Ariana Grande; Max Martin; Ilya Salmanzadeh; Savan Kotecha	Thank U, Next	2019	
"Borderline"	Ariana Grande featuring Missy Elliott	Pharrell Williams; Melissa Arnette Elliott	Sweetener	2018	
"The Boy Is Mine" †	Ariana Grande	Ariana Grande; Max Martin; Shintaro Yasuda; David Park	Eternal Sunshine	2024	
"Boyfriend" †	Ariana Grande and Social House	Ariana Grande Edgar Barrera; Steven Franks; Tommy Brown; Michael Foster; Charles Anderson	Everything Changed...	2019	
"Boys Like You" †	Who Is Fancy featuring Meghan Trainor and Ariana Grande	Bob DiPiero; Jason Gantt; Jake Hagood; J.R. Rotem	Non-album single	2015	
"Brand New You"	Brynn Williams, Ariana Grande, Caitlin Gann and 13 Original Broadway Cast	Jason Robert Brown	13 (Original Broadway Cast Recording)	2008	
"Break Free" †	Ariana Grande featuring Zedd	Zedd; Max Martin; Savan Kotecha	My Everything	2014	
"Break Up with Your Girlfriend, I'm Bored" †	Ariana Grande	Ariana Grande; Max Martin; Ilya Salmanzadeh; Savan Kotecha; Kandi Burruss; Kevin "She'kspere" Briggs	Thank U, Next	2019	
"Break Your Heart Right Back"	Ariana Grande featuring Childish Gambino	Kirby Dockery; Andrew "Pop" Wansel; Warren "Oak" Felder; Donald Glover; Bernard Edwards; Nile Rodgers; Steven Jordan; Christopher Wallace; Sean Combs; Mason Betha	My Everything	2014	
"Breathin" †	Ariana Grande	Ariana Grande; Ilya Salmanzadeh; Savan Kotecha; Peter Svensson	Sweetener	2018	
"Bye"	Ariana Grande	Ariana Grande; Max Martin; Ilya Salmanzadeh	Eternal Sunshine	2024	
"Cadillac Song"	Ariana Grande	Ariana Grande; Tommy Brown; Victoria McCants; Travis Sayles; Leon Sylvers	My Everything	2014	
"Come So Far (Got So Far to Go)"	Ariana Grande, Jennifer Hudson and the Original Television Cast of Hairspray LIVE!	Marc Shaiman, Scott Whitman	Hairspray Live! (Original Soundtrack of the NBC Television Event)	2016	
"Congratulations"	Mac Miller featuring Bilal	Malcolm McCormick; Bilal Oliver; Aja Grant	The Divine Feminine	2016	
"Dance to This" †	Troye Sivan featuring Ariana Grande	Troye Mellet; Brett McLaughlin; Oscar Holter; Jonnali Mikaela Parmenius	Bloom	2018	
"Dancing Through Life"	Jonathan Bailey featuring Ariana Grande, Ethan Slater, Marissa Bode and Cynthia Erivo	Stephen Schwartz	Wicked: The Soundtrack	2024	
"Dandelion"	Ariana Grande	Ariana Grande	Eternal Sunshine Deluxe: Brighter Days Ahead	2025	
"Dangerous Woman" †	Ariana Grande	Johan Carlsson; Ross Golan	Dangerous Woman	2016	
"Daydreamin'"	Ariana Grande	Matt Squire; Tommy Brown; Victoria McCants	Yours Truly	2013	
"Dear Old Shiz"	Shiz University Choir featuring Ariana Grande	Stephen Schwartz	Wicked: The Soundtrack	2024	
"December"	Ariana Grande	Thomas Lee Brown; Michael Foster; Steven Franks; Ariana Grande; Victoria McCants; Travis Sayles; Ryan Matthew Tedder	Christmas & Chill	2015	
"Defying Gravity" †	Cynthia Erivo featuring Ariana Grande	Stephen Schwartz	Wicked: The Soundtrack	2024	
"Die For You" (remix) †	The Weeknd and Ariana Grande	Henry Walter; Martin McKinney; Abel Tesfaye; Dylan Wiggins; Magnus Hoiberg; Mejdi Rhars; William Walsh	Starboy (Deluxe Edition)	2023	
"Die in Your Arms"	Ariana Grande	Rodney Jerkins; Dennis "Aganee" Jenkins; Travis Sayles; Thomas Lumpkins; Kelly Lumpkins; Herb Rooney; Alphonso Mizell; Berry Gordy; Deke Richards; Freddie Perren	Non-album single	2012	
"Don't Call Me Angel" †	Ariana Grande, Miley Cyrus and Lana Del Rey	Alma-Sofia Miettinen; Ariana Grande; Ilya Salmanzadeh; Lana Del Rey; Max Martin; Miley Cyrus; Savan Kotecha	Charlie's Angels	2019	
"Don't Wanna Break Up Again"	Ariana Grande	Ariana Grande; Max Martin; Ilya Salmanzadeh	Eternal Sunshine	2024	
"Don't You (Forget About Me)"	Victoria Justice and Victorious Cast	Keith Forsey; Steve Schiff	Victorious 2.0: More Music from the Hit TV Show	2012	
"E Più Ti Penso" †	Andrea Bocelli and Ariana Grande	Ennio Morricone; Mogol; Tony Renis	Cinema	2015	
"Earth" †	Lil Dicky and other artists	Benjamin Levin; David Burd; Jamil Chammas; Joshua Coleman; Magnus August Høiberg	Non-album single	2019	
"Eternal Sunshine"	Ariana Grande	Ariana Grande; Max Martin; Shintaro Yasuda; David Park	Eternal Sunshine	2024	
"Everyday" †	Ariana Grande featuring Future	Ariana Grande; Savan Kotecha; Ilya Salmanzadeh; Nayvadius Wilburn	Dangerous Woman	2016	
"Everytime"	Ariana Grande	Ariana Grande; Ilya Salmanzadeh; Savan Kotecha; Max Martin	Sweetener	2018	
"Faith" †	Stevie Wonder featuring Ariana Grande	Ryan Benjamin Tedder; Benjamin Levin; Francis Farewell Starlite	Sing: Original Motion Picture Soundtrack	2016	
"Fake Smile"	Ariana Grande	Andrew Wansel; Nathan Perez; Priscilla Renea; Kennedi Lykken; Justin Tranter; Ariana Grande; Joseph W. Frierson; Mary Lou Frierson	Thank U, Next	2019	
"Focus" †	Ariana Grande	Ariana Grande; Savan Kotecha; Peter Svensson; Ilya Salmanzadeh	Dangerous Woman (Japanese Edition)	2015	
"For Good"	Ariana Grande and Cynthia Erivo	Stephen Schwartz	Wicked: For Good – The Soundtrack	2025	
"Get on Your Knees"	Nicki Minaj featuring Ariana Grande	Onika Maraj; Katy Perry; Chloe Angelides; Lukasz Gottwald; Sarah Hudson; Jacob Kasher Hindlin; Henry Walter	The Pinkprint	2014	
"Get Well Soon"	Ariana Grande	Pharrell Williams; Ariana Grande	Sweetener	2018	
"Ghostin"	Ariana Grande	Ariana Grande; Max Martin; Ilya Salmanzadeh; Savan Kotecha; Victoria Monét; Tayla Parx	Thank U, Next	2019	
"The Girl in the Bubble"	Ariana Grande	Stephen Schwartz	Wicked: For Good – The Soundtrack	2025	
"Give It Up"	Victorious Cast featuring Elizabeth Gillies and Ariana Grande	CJ Abraham; Dan Schneider; Michael Corcoran	Victorious: Music from the Hit TV Show	2010	
"God Is a Woman" †	Ariana Grande	Ariana Grande; Ilya Salmanzadeh; Max Martin; Savan Kotecha; Rickard Göransson	Sweetener	2018	
"Good as Hell" (remix) †	Lizzo featuring Ariana Grande	Ariana Grande; Lizzo; Ricky Reed	Cuz I Love You (Super Deluxe Edition)	2019	
"Goodnight n Go"	Ariana Grande	Michael Foster; Ariana Grande; Victoria McCants; Tommy Brown; Charles Anderson	Sweetener	2018	
"Got Her Own"	Ariana Grande and Victoria Monét	Ariana Grande; Victoria Monét; Tommy Brown; Travis Sayles; Tayla Parx; Steven Franks	Charlie's Angels	2019	
"Greedy"	Ariana Grande	Max Martin; Savan Kotecha; Alexander Kronlund; Ilya Salmanzadeh	Dangerous Woman	2016	
"Hampstead"	Ariana Grande	Ariana Grande	Eternal Sunshine Deluxe: Brighter Days Ahead	2025	
"A Hand for Mrs. Claus"	Idina Menzel featuring Ariana Grande	Robert Lopez; Kristen Anderson-Lopez	Christmas: A Season of Love	2019	
"Hands on Me"	Ariana Grande featuring A$AP Ferg	Rodney "Darkchild" Jerkins; Alicia Renee Williams; Adrianne Birge; Darold Ferguson Jr.	My Everything	2014	
"Hate That I Made You Love Me" †	Ariana Grande	Ariana Grande; Ilya Salmanzadeh; Max Martin	Petal	2026	
"Haunt You"	Social House	Anton Göransson; Charles Anderson; Isabella Sjostrand; Michael Foster; Tommy Brown	Everything Changed...	2019	
"Heatstroke" †	Calvin Harris featuring Young Thug, Pharrell Williams and Ariana Grande	Pharrell Williams; Brittany Talia Hazzard; Jeffery Lamar Williams; Calvin Harris; Robin Hannibal; Cecilie Karshøj; Ariana Grande	Funk Wav Bounces Vol. 1	2017	
"Honeymoon Avenue"	Ariana Grande	Antonio Dixon; Dennis "Aganee" Jenkins; Kenneth "Babyface" Edmonds; Khristopher Riddick-Tynes; Leon Thomas III; Maurice Wade; Roahn Hylton; Thomas Lee Brown; Travis Sayles; Victoria McCants	Yours Truly	2013	
"Hotel Rock Bottom"	Frankie Grande featuring Ariana Grande	Frankie Grande; Kate Morgan; Sam Lassner; Malia Civetz	Hotel Rock Bottom (Deluxe)	2025	
"How I Look on You"	Ariana Grande	Ariana Grande; Max Martin; Ilya Salmanzadeh; Savan Kotecha	Charlie's Angels	2019	
"I Don't Care"	Ariana Grande	Tommy Brown; Travis Sayles; Steven Franks; Ryan Matthew Tedder; Michael Foster; Victoria McCants	Dangerous Woman	2016	
"I Don't Do Drugs"	Doja Cat featuring Ariana Grande	Amala Zandile Dlamini; Ari Starace; Ariana Grande; Sheldon Yu-Ting Cheung	Planet Her	2021	
"I Don't Know Why (I Just Do)"	Jeff Goldblum & the Mildred Snitzer Orchestra featuring Ariana Grande	Fred E. Ahlert; Roy Turk	Still Blooming	2025	
"I Want You Back"	Victorious Cast and Victoria Justice	The Corporation	Victorious: Music from the Hit TV Show	2011	
"I Wish I Hated You"	Ariana Grande	Ariana Grande; Ilya Salmanzadeh	Eternal Sunshine	2024	
"Imagine" #	Ariana Grande	Ariana Grande; Andrew "Pop" Wansel; Jameel Roberts; Nathan Perez; Priscilla Renea	Thank U, Next	2018	
"Imperfect for You"	Ariana Grande	Ariana Grande; Peter Kahm; Max Martin; Ilya Salmanzadeh	Eternal Sunshine	2024	
"In My Head"	Ariana Grande	Andrew Wansel; Ariana Grande; Nathan Perez; Brittany Chi Coney; Denisia Andrews; Lindel Deon Nelson Jr; Jameel Roberts	Thank U, Next	2019	
"Into You" †	Ariana Grande	Ariana Grande; Max Martin; Savan Kotecha; Alexander Kronlund; Ilya Salmanzadeh	Dangerous Woman	2016	
"Into You" (Alex Ghenea remix) †	Ariana Grande featuring Mac Miller	Ariana Grande; Malcolm McCormick; Max Martin; Savan Kotecha; Alexander Kronlund; Ilya Salmanzadeh	Non-album single	2016	
"Intro"	Ariana Grande	Ariana Grande; Tommy Brown; Victoria McCants	My Everything	2014	
"Intro"	Ariana Grande	Thomas Lee Brown; Michael Foster; Steven Franks; Ariana Grande; Victoria McCants; Travis Sayles; Ryan Matthew Tedder	Christmas & Chill	2015	
"Intro (End of the World)"	Ariana Grande	Ariana Grande; Shintaro Yasuda; Nick lee Aaron Cheung	Eternal Sunshine	2024	
"Intro (End of the World) (Extended)"	Ariana Grande	Ariana Grande	Eternal Sunshine Deluxe: Brighter Days Ahead	2025	
"It Can't Be True"	Elizabeth Gillies, Caitlin Gann and 13 Original Broadway Cast	Jason Robert Brown	13 (Original Broadway Cast Recording)	2008	
"It Was a... (Masked Christmas)" †	Jimmy Fallon, Ariana Grande and Megan Thee Stallion	Gregory Hein; Ido Zmishlany; Jimmy Fallon; Myles William; Rami Yacoub	Holiday Seasoning	2021	
"Jason's Song (Gave It Away)" #	Ariana Grande	Jason Robert Brown; Ariana Grande	Dangerous Woman	2016	
"Just a Little Bit of Your Heart"	Ariana Grande	Harry Styles; Johan Carlsson	My Everything	2014	
"Just Like Magic"	Ariana Grande	Ariana Grande; Tommy Brown; Steven Franks; Shea Taylor; Priscilla Renea	Positions	2020	
"Just Look Up"	Ariana Grande and Kid Cudi	Ariana Grande; Scott Mescudi; Nicholas Britell; Taura Stinson	Don't Look Up (Original Motion Picture Soundtrack)	2021	
"Knew Better / Forever Boy"	Ariana Grande	Ariana Grande; Steven Franks; Victoria McCants; Michael Foster; Ryan Matthew Tedder; Tommy Brown	Dangerous Woman	2016	
"Knew Better Part Two"	Ariana Grande	Ariana Grande; Steven Franks; Victoria McCants; Michael Foster; Ryan Matthew Tedder; Tommy Brown	Non-album single	2016	
"L.A. Boyz" #	Victorious Cast featuring Victoria Justice and Ariana Grande	Allan Grigg; Dan Schneider; Lindy Robbins; Michael Corcoran	Victorious 3.0: Even More Music from the Hit TV Show	2012	
"Last Christmas" †	Ariana Grande	George Michael	Christmas Kisses	2013	
"Leave It All to Shine" #	Victoria Justice, Victorious Cast and iCarly featuring Miranda Cosgrove and Victoria Justice	Dan Schneider; Lukasz Gottwald; Michael Corcoran	Victorious: Music from the Hit TV Show	2011	
"Leave Me Lonely"	Ariana Grande featuring Macy Gray	Tommy Brown; Steven Franks; Thomas Parker Lumpkins; Victoria McCants	Dangerous Woman	2016	
"Let Me Love You" #	Ariana Grande featuring Lil Wayne	Ariana Grande; Tommy Brown; Victoria McCants; Steven Franks; Dwayne Carter	Dangerous Woman	2016	
"The Light Is Coming" #	Ariana Grande featuring Nicki Minaj	Ariana Grande; Pharrell Williams; Onika Maraj	Sweetener	2018	
"A Little More Homework"	Graham Phillips, Ariana Grande and 13 Original Broadway Cast	Jason Robert Brown	13 (Original Broadway Cast Recording)	2008	
"Love Is Everything" †	Ariana Grande	Ariana Grande; Khristopher Riddick-Tynes; Leon Thomas III; Kenneth "Babyface" Edmonds; Antonio Dixon	Christmas Kisses	2013	
"Love Language"	Ariana Grande	Ariana Grande; Tommy Brown; Victoria Monét; Travis Sayles; Tayla Parx; Kam Parker; Tommy Parker	Positions	2020	
"Love Me Harder" †	Ariana Grande with the Weeknd	Max Martin; Savan Kotecha; Peter Svensson; Ali Payami; Abel Tesfaye; Ahmad Balshe	My Everything	2014	
"Lovin' It"	Ariana Grande	Kristopher Riddick-Tynes; Leon Thomas III; Rickey Offord; Kenneth "Babyface" Edmonds; Antonio Dixon; Mark Morales; Kirk S. Robinson; Nathaniel V Robinson; Cory Rooney	Yours Truly	2013	
"Main Thing"	Ariana Grande	Ariana Grande; Tommy Brown; Steven Franks; Courageous Xavier Herrera; Josh Conerly; Travis Sayles; Yonatan Watts	Positions (Deluxe Edition)	2021	
"Make Up"	Ariana Grande	Ariana Grande; Victoria Monét; Tayla Parx; Tommy Brown; Brian Malik Baptiste	Thank U, Next	2019	
"Mama, I'm a Big Girl Now"	Maddie Baillio, Ariana Grande, Dove Cameron, Harvey Fierstein, Andrea Martin, Kristin Chenoweth and the Original Television Cast of Hairspray LIVE!	Marc Shaiman, Scott Whitman	Hairspray Live! (Original Soundtrack of the NBC Television Event)	2016	
"Met Him Last Night" †	Demi Lovato featuring Ariana Grande	Albert Stanaj; Ariana Grande; Courageous Xavier Herrera; Thomas Lee Brown	Dancing With the Devil... The Art of Starting Over	2021	
"Monopoly" †	Ariana Grande and Victoria Monét	Ariana Grande; Victoria Monét; Charles Anderson; Michael Foster; Tim Suby	Thank U, Next (Japanese Deluxe Edition)	2019	
"Moonlight"	Ariana Grande	Ariana Grande; Tommy Brown; Victoria McCants; Peter Lee Johnson	Dangerous Woman	2016	
"Motive"	Ariana Grande featuring Doja Cat	Ariana Grande; Tommy Brown; Steven Franks; Victoria Monét; Doja Cat; Nija Charles; James McIntyre; Shane Lindstrom	Positions	2020	
"My Everything"	Ariana Grande	Ariana Grande; Tommy Brown; Victoria McCants; Taylor Parks	My Everything	2014	
"My Favorite Part" †	Mac Miller featuring Ariana Grande	Malcolm McCormick; Ariana Grande; Tyrone Johnson	The Divine Feminine	2016	
"My Heart Belongs to Daddy" (Live)	Ariana Grande	Cole Porter	K Bye for Now (SWT Live)	2019	
"My Hair"	Ariana Grande	Ariana Grande; Tommy Brown; Victoria Monét; Tayla Parx; Scott Storch; Anthony M. Jones; Scootie	Positions	2020	
"NASA"	Ariana Grande	Ariana Grande; Victoria Monét; Tayla Parx; Tommy Brown; Charles Anderson	Thank U, Next	2019	
"Nasty"	Ariana Grande	Ariana Grande; Tommy Brown; Victoria Monét; Travis Sayles; Khris Riddick-Tynes; Leon Thomas III; Nami	Positions	2020	
"Needy"	Ariana Grande	Ariana Grande; Victoria Monét; Tayla Parx; Tommy Brown	Thank U, Next	2019	
"Nobody"	Ariana Grande and Chaka Khan	Ariana Grande; Max Martin; Ilya Salmanzadeh; Savan Kotecha	Charlie's Angels	2019	
"No One Mourns the Wicked"	Ariana Grande featuring Andy Nyman, Courtney Mae-Briggs, Jeff Goldblum, Sharon D. Clarke and Jenna Boyd	Stephen Schwartz	Wicked: The Soundtrack	2024	
"No Tears Left to Cry" †	Ariana Grande	Ariana Grande; Max Martin; Ilya Salmanzadeh; Savan Kotecha	Sweetener	2018	
"Not Just on Christmas"	Ariana Grande	Thomas Lee Brown; Steven Franks; Ariana Grande; Peter Lee Johnson; Victoria McCants; Travis Sayles	Christmas & Chill	2015	
"Obvious"	Ariana Grande	Ariana Grande; Tommy Brown; Steven Franks; Nija Charles; Travis Sayles; Peter Lee Johnson; Ryan Tedder; Josh Conerly	Positions	2020	
"Off the Table"	Ariana Grande and the Weeknd	Ariana Grande; Tommy Brown; Steven Franks; Travis Sayles; The Weeknd; Shintaro Yasuda	Positions	2020	
"Oh Santa!" †	Mariah Carey featuring Ariana Grande and Jennifer Hudson	Mariah Carey; Jermaine Dupri; Bryan-Michael Cox	Mariah Carey's Magical Christmas Special	2020	
"One Last Time" †	Ariana Grande	David Guetta; Savan Kotecha; Giorgio Tuinfort; Rami Yacoub; Carl Falk	My Everything	2014	
"One Last Time (Attends-Moi)" †	Ariana Grande featuring Kendji Girac	David Guetta; Savan Kotecha; Giorgio Tuinfort; Rami Yacoub; Carl Falk; Nazim Khaled	Kendji (Deluxe Edition)	2015	
"One Short Day"	Cynthia Erivo and Ariana Grande	Stephen Schwartz	Wicked: The Soundtrack	2024	
"Only 1"	Ariana Grande	Ariana Grande; Tommy Brown; Victoria McCants; Travis Sayles; Dennis Jenkins	My Everything (Deluxe Edition)	2014	
"Ordinary Things"	Ariana Grande featuring Nonna	Ariana Grande; Marjorie Grande; Luka Kloser; Nick Lee; Max Martin	Eternal Sunshine	2024	
"Over and Over Again" (remix) †	Nathan Sykes featuring Ariana Grande	Greg Bonnick; Hayden Chapman; Jin Choi; Nathan Sykes; Ali Tennant	Unfinished Business (Deluxe Edition)	2016	
"Past Life”	Ariana Grande	Ariana Grande	Eternal Sunshine Deluxe: Brighter Days Ahead	2025	
"Pete Davidson"	Ariana Grande	Tommy Brown; Ariana Grande; Charles Anderson; Victoria McCants	Sweetener	2018	
"Piano"	Ariana Grande	Harmony Samuels; Jahmaal Noel Fyffe; Parker Ighile; Anisa Moghaddam; Moses Ayo Samuels; Olaniyi Michael Akinkunm; Ariana Grande	Yours Truly	2013	
"Popular" †	Ariana Grande	Stephen Schwartz	Wicked: The Soundtrack	2024	
"Popular Song" †	Mika featuring Ariana Grande	Mika; Priscilla Renea; Mathieu Jomphe; Stephen Schwartz	The Origin of Love and Yours Truly	2013	
"Positions" †	Ariana Grande	Angelina Barrett; Brian Vincent Bates; Tommy Brown; Nija Charles; Steven Franks; Ariana Grande; London Tyler Holmes; James Jarvis	Positions	2020	
"POV"	Ariana Grande	Ariana Grande; Oliver "Junior" Frid; Steven Franks; Tayla Parx; Tommy Brown	Positions	2020	
"Problem" †	Ariana Grande featuring Iggy Azalea	Ilya Salmanzadeh; Max Martin; Savan Kotecha; Amethyst Kelly; Ariana Grande	My Everything	2014	
"Put Your Hearts Up" †	Ariana Grande	Ariana Grande; Linda Perry; Martin Johnson; Matt Squire	Non-album single	2011	
"Quit"	Cashmere Cat featuring Ariana Grande	Magnus August Høiberg; Frank Romano; Benjamin Levin; Sia Furler; Ariana Grande	9	2017	
"Rain on Me" †	Lady Gaga and Ariana Grande	Lady Gaga; Ariana Grande; Boys Noize; Nija Charles; Rami Yacoub; BloodPop; Tchami; Burns	Chromatica	2020	
"R.E.M"	Ariana Grande	Pharrell Williams	Sweetener	2018	
"Raindrops (An Angel Cried)"	Ariana Grande	Bob Gaudio; Charles Calello	Sweetener	2018	
"Research"	Big Sean featuring Ariana Grande	Sean Anderson; Ariana Grande; Dacoury Natche; Michael "Mike" Carson; Leland Wayne	Dark Sky Paradise	2015	
"Right There" †	Ariana Grande featuring Big Sean	Harmony Samuels; H. "Carmen Reece" Culvar; J. "Lonny" Bereal; James "J-Doe" Smith; Al Sherrod Lambert; Ariana Grande; Sean Anderson; Jeff Lorber	Yours Truly	2013	
"Rule the World" †	2 Chainz featuring Ariana Grande	Tauheed Epps; Carl McCormick; Christian Ward; Robert Watson; Racquelle Anteola; Moore Ray III; Lerron Carson; Richard Harrison	Rap or Go to the League	2019	
"Safety Net"	Ariana Grande featuring Ty Dolla Sign	Ariana Grande; Tommy Brown; Ty Dolla Sign; Khris Riddick-Tynes; Leon Thomas III; Silas Doss	Positions	2020	
"Santa Baby" †	Ariana Grande featuring Elizabeth Gillies	Joan Javits; Philip Springer; Tony Springer	Christmas Kisses	2013	
"Santa, Can't You Hear Me" †	Kelly Clarkson featuring Ariana Grande	Kelly Clarkson; Aben Eubanks	When Christmas Comes Around...	2021	
"Santa Tell Me" †	Ariana Grande	Ariana Grande; Savan Kotecha; Ilya	Christmas Kisses (Japanese Special Edition) and Christmas and Chill	2014	
"Saturn Returns Interlude"	Ariana Grande	Diana Garland; Ariana Grande; Max Martin; Ilya Salmanzadeh	Eternal Sunshine	2024	
"Save Your Tears" (remix) †	The Weeknd and Ariana Grande	Abel Tesfaye; Ahmad Balshe; Jason Quenneville; Max Martin; Oscar Holter; Ariana Grande	After Hours (Deluxe Edition)	2021	
"Shut Up"	Ariana Grande	Ariana Grande; Tommy Brown; Steven Franks; Peter Lee Johnson; Tayla Parx; Travis Sayles; Michael Foster	Positions	2020	
"Side to Side" †	Ariana Grande featuring Nicki Minaj	Ariana Grande; Ilya Salmanzadeh; Max Martin; Onika Maraj; Alexander Kronlund; Savan Kotecha	Dangerous Woman	2016	
"Six Thirty"	Ariana Grande	Ariana Grande; Tommy Brown; Steven Franks; Shea Taylor; Priscilla Renea; Nami	Positions	2020	
"Snow in California" †	Ariana Grande	Ariana Grande; Khristopher Riddick-Tynes; Leon Thomas III; Kenneth "Babyface" Edmonds; Antonio Dixon	Christmas Kisses	2013	
"Someone like U (interlude)"	Ariana Grande	Ariana Grande; Tommy Brown; Travis Sayles; Andrew Wansel; Marqueze Parker; Sam Wishkoski	Positions (Deluxe Edition)	2021	
"Sometimes"	Ariana Grande	Max Martin; Savan Kotecha; Ilya Salmanzadeh; Peter Svensson	Dangerous Woman	2016	
"Somewhere Over the Rainbow" (Live From Manchester) †	Ariana Grande	Harold Arlen; E.Y. "Yip" Harburg	Non-album single	2017	
"Step On Up"	Ariana Grande	Tommy Brown; Victoria McCants; Shane Stevens; Nicholas Audino; Ryan Vojtesak; Lewis Hughes; Jamil Chammas	Dangerous Woman	2016	
"Stuck with U" †	Ariana Grande and Justin Bieber	Ariana Grande; Justin Bieber; Gian Stone; Whitney Phillips; Skyler Stonestreet; Freddy Wexler; Scooter Braun	Non-album single	2020	
"Successful"	Ariana Grande	Pharrell Williams	Sweetener	2018	
"Supernatural"	Ariana Grande	Ariana Grande; Max Martin; Oscar Görres	Eternal Sunshine	2024	
"Supernatural" (remix)	Ariana Grande featuring Troye Sivan	Ariana Grande; Max Martin; Oscar Görres; Troye Sivan; Brett Leland McLaughlin	Eternal Sunshine (Slightly Deluxe Edition)	2024	
"Sweetener"	Ariana Grande	Ariana Grande; Pharrell Williams	Sweetener	2018	
"Sympathy Is a Knife" (Remix)	Charli XCX featuring Ariana Grande	Charlotte Aitchison; Ariana Grande; Finn Keane; Jonathan Christopher Shave	Brat and It's Completely Different but Also Still Brat	2024	
"Take Care"	Leon Thomas III featuring Ariana Grande	Drake; Noah Shebib; Anthony Palman; Jamie xx Brook Benton	Metro Hearts	2012	
"Tattooed Heart"	Ariana Grande	Kristopher Riddick-Tynes; Leon Thomas III; Antonio Dixon; Kenneth "Babyface" Edmonds; Matt Squire; Ariana Grande; Sean Foreman	Yours Truly	2013	
"Test Drive"	Ariana Grande	Ariana Grande; Tommy Brown; Travis Sayles; Shane Lindstrom; Tayla Parx; Victoria Monét; Zachary Foster	Positions (Deluxe Edition)	2021	
"Thank Goodness / I Couldn't Be Happier"	Ariana Grande, Michelle Yeoh and Jonathan Bailey	Stephen Schwartz	Wicked: For Good – The Soundtrack	2025	
"Thank U, Next" †	Ariana Grande	Ariana Grande; Charles Anderson; Michael Foster; Tayla Parx; Tommy Brown; Victoria McCants	Thank U, Next	2018	
"They Don't Know"	Ariana Grande	Justin Timberlake; Savan Kotecha; Ilya Salmanzadeh	Trolls: Original Motion Picture Soundtrack	2016	
"Thinking Bout You"	Ariana Grande	Peter Svensson; Chloe Angelides; Jacob Kasher Hindlin; Mathieu Jomphe Lépine	Dangerous Woman	2016	
"This Is Not a Feminist Song" †	Saturday Night Live Cast featuring Ariana Grande		Non-album single	2016	
"Time" †	Childish Gambino	Donald Glover; Dacoury Natche; Ludwig Göransson; Chukwudi Hodge; Sarah Aarons	3.15.20	2020	
"Too Close"	Ariana Grande	Ariana Grande; Harmony Samuels; Helen "Carmen Reece" Culver; Al Sherrod Lambert; Maurice David Wade	My Everything	2014	
"Touch It"	Ariana Grande	Max Martin; Savan Kotecha; Peter Svensson; Ali Payami	Dangerous Woman	2016	
"True Love"	Ariana Grande	Thomas Lee Brown; Michael Foster; Steven Franks; Ariana Grande; Peter Lee Johnson; Victoria McCants; Travis Sayles; Ryan Matthew Tedder	Christmas & Chill	2015	
"True Story"	Ariana Grande	Ariana Grande; Max Martin	Eternal Sunshine	2024	
"Twilight Zone"	Ariana Grande	Ariana Grande	Eternal Sunshine Deluxe: Brighter Days Ahead	2025	
"Voodoo Love"	Ariana Grande	Rosemary Sebert; Allan Peter Grigg; Ariana Grande	Non-album single	2016	
"Warm"	Ariana Grande	Ariana Grande	Eternal Sunshine Deluxe: Brighter Days Ahead	2025	
"The Way" †	Ariana Grande featuring Mac Miller	Harmony Samuels; Amber Streeter; Al Sherrod Lambert; Jordin Sparks; Malcolm McCormick; Brenda Russell	Yours Truly	2013	
"We Can't Be Friends (Wait for Your Love)" †	Ariana Grande	Ariana Grande; Max Martin; Ilya Salmanzadeh	Eternal Sunshine	2024	
"West Side"	Ariana Grande	Ariana Grande; Tommy Brown; Victoria Monét; Xavi; Ammar Junedi	Positions	2020	
"What Do You Mean?" (remix)	Justin Bieber featuring Ariana Grande	Justin Bieber; Jason "Poo Bear" Boyd; Mason Levy	Purpose	2015	
"What Is This Feeling?"	Ariana Grande and Cynthia Erivo	Stephen Schwartz	Wicked: The Soundtrack	2024	
"Why Try"	Ariana Grande	Benjamin Levin; Ryan Benjamin Tedder; Ammar Malik; Noel Zancanella	My Everything	2014	
"Winter Things"	Ariana Grande	Thomas Lee Brown; Steven Franks; Ariana Grande; Peter Lee Johnson; Victoria McCants; Travis Sayles	Christmas & Chill	2015	
"Wit It This Christmas"	Ariana Grande	Thomas Lee Brown; Michael Foster; Ariana Grande; Peter Lee Johnson; Victoria McCants; Travis Sayles; Ryan Matthew Tedder	Christmas & Chill	2015	
"Without Love"	Garrett Clayton, Maddie Baillio, Ariana Grande, Ephraim Sykes and the Original Television Cast of Hairspray LIVE!	Marc Shaiman, Scott Whitman	Hairspray Live! (Original Soundtrack of the NBC Television Event)	2016	
"The Wizard and I" (Live)	Ariana Grande	Stephen Schwartz	Wicked (15th Anniversary Special Edition)	2019	
"Wonderful"	Ariana Grande, Jeff Goldblum and Cynthia Erivo	Stephen Schwartz	Wicked: For Good – The Soundtrack	2025	
"Worst Behavior"	Ariana Grande	Ariana Grande; Tommy Brown; Tayla Parx; Steven Franks; Thomas Lumpkins	Positions (Deluxe Edition)	2021	
"Yes, And?" †	Ariana Grande	Ariana Grande Max Martin; Ilya Salmanzadeh	Eternal Sunshine	2024	
"Yes, And?" (remix) †	Ariana Grande and Mariah Carey	Ariana Grande; Mariah Carey	Eternal Sunshine (Slightly Deluxe Edition)	2024	
"You Don't Know Me"	Ariana Grande	H. Carmen Reece Culver Harmony Samuels Al Sherrod Lambert Ariana Grande Maurice David Wade	My Everything (Deluxe Edition)	2014	
"You Don't Own Me"	Kristin Chenoweth and Ariana Grande	David White John Madara	For the Girls	2019	
"You'll Never Know"	Ariana Grande	Kristopher Riddick-Tynes; Leon Thomas III; Antonio Dixon; Kenneth "Babyface" Edmonds	Yours Truly	2013	
"Zero to Hero"	Ariana Grande	Alan Menken; David Zippel	We Love Disney	2015	

== Unreleased songs ==
Unreleased songs recorded by Ariana Grande
Song	Notes	Ref.
"Pink Champagne"	Written by Grande, Pebe Sebert, Damon Sharpe, and Matt Squire.; Grande posted the song on YouTube in October 2013.; Grande performed the song on The Honeymoon Tour (2015).; Registered by the American Society of Composers, Authors and Publishers (ASCAP).	
"Boyfriend Material"	Intended for Yours Truly (2013).; The song was later purchased by f(x), a South Korean girl group, and reworked into their song "No More" (2013).; Grande later posted the song's studio version on May 14, 2014.	
"I Don't Want to Be Alone For Christmas"	Song written by Diane Warren.; The song was subsequently featured in full in an article on perezhilton.com in November 2014.	
"Nobody Does It Better"	Intended for Yours Truly (2013).; Leaked on May 8, 2016.	
"Ridiculous"	Originally intended for My Everything (2014).; Produced by Blaq Tuxedo.; Grande has said about the song: "It's a great song—I love it. I'm not sure if I'll be able to keep it or not because there's a little string sample in it, but I want to take all the music out and do something different anyway. So I'm going to change that."; Leaked on October 22, 2017.	
"Don't Be Gone Too Long"	Duet with singer Chris Brown.; Intended for Brown's sixth studio album, X (2014).; The song, which in its original form features Grande, was announced to be released as a single on March 25, 2014. However, due to Brown's legal problems at the time, the single release was scrapped on March 17, even though a music video had already been filmed.; As such, Grande was eventually missing from the album version of the song and had her vocals replaced by Cathy Dennis (one of the song's writers).	
"In Your Hands"	Produced by Diplo.; Teased by Diplo in 2016.; Leaked on October 21, 2018.	
"My Way"	Intended for Sweetener (2018).; Produced by Hit-Boy.; Grande posted a snippet in August 2016.; Two demos of the song leaked on February 11, 2023.	
"Remember"	Intended for Thank U, Next (2019).	
"Sober"	Grande released a snippet in 2016.; Produced by Hit-Boy.; Intended for Sweetener (2018).	
"You"	Intended for Sweetener.; Leaked on October 3, 2021.	
"Fantasize"	Song written by Grande for a comedy sketch about a girl group.; Leaked in June 2023.; Released to Spotify unofficially under the title "But Just Before I Go, Theres Something You Should Know" by the account Adriana Venti.; Following fans' positive reception to "Fantasize", Grande was inspired to incorporate elements of the song into "The Boy Is Mine".	

- "Esta Noche"
- "More"

== See also ==
- Ariana Grande discography
- Max Martin production discography
