= Christmas Kisses =

Christmas Kisses may refer to:

== Music ==
- Christmas Kisses (EP), an EP by Ariana Grande
- Christmas Kisses (album), a 2018 album by Serena Ryder

=== Song ===
- "Christmas Kisses" (The Bookends song) (1961)
- "Christmas Kisses", a 2012 song by Boz Boorer
- "Christmas Kisses", a song by Paul McCartney from Kisses on the Bottom

== Other uses ==
- Christmas Kisses, a 1996 book by Linda Howard with Debbie Macomber and Linda Turner
