= Christmas & Chill =

EP by Ariana Grande
- Released: December 18, 2015
- Recorded: December 2015
- Studio: Grande's home studio (Hollywood)
- Genres: Christmas; trap; R&B
- Length: 13:10
- Label: Republic
- Producers: Tommy Brown; Mr. Franks; The Magi; Travis Sayles

Ariana Grande chronology
My Everything (2014)	Christmas & Chill (2015)	Dangerous Woman (2016)

Christmas & Chill is the second Christmas record and extended play (EP) by American singer Ariana Grande. It was released on December 18, 2015, by Republic Records, as a follow-up to her 2013 Christmas EP Christmas Kisses and her 2014 Christmas single "Santa Tell Me". The EP features six, original, R&B-inspired Christmas tracks produced by American producers Tommy Brown, Mr. Franks, The Magi, and Travis Sayles. Grande has expressed admiration and has referred to it as her "favorite body of work".

The EP received favorable reviews from music critics. It debuted at number 34 on the Billboard 200 albums chart and at number 3 on the Billboard Holiday Albums ranking in the United States. It opened with 35,000 album equivalent units in its first week of release in the US, and has sold over 180,000 copies worldwide. Christmas & Chill was originally only available on streaming and as a digital download, but on November 18, 2016, the EP was released digitally and on CD in Japan with new artwork and the Alex Ghenea remix of "Into You", as an exclusive bonus track.

The EP gained renewed interest when it was reissued as a vinyl record in November 2019, featuring the naughty version of "Santa Tell Me" as a hidden track, which later was added to a digital reissue of the EP worldwide in 2023.

== Recording and music ==
According to Tommy Brown, the EP was recorded in four days at Ariana Grande's home studio, in Hollywood. Songwriting credits are shared by Grande with Brown. For Rolling Stone's Brittany Spanos, the EP consists of "romantic Christmas ballads over trap beats", commenting that "the one song to stand out from the more R&B-leaning EP is the folky 'Winter Things', where the acoustic track resembles Jason Mraz, as Grande sings 'My baby's in town and we're gonna do some winter things'".

== Critical reception ==
Jaleesa M. Jones in USA Today called it "a festive ode to winter romance." Emma Garland from Noisey said the album "basically sounds like a Cassie album ... but with sleigh bells and lyrics like 'tis the season for some love giving!' It's basically the perfect festive romp." Two years after its release, MTV's Sydney Gore and Brian Anthony Hernandez revisited the EP, calling it "a new holiday classic" and "a catalyst of original Christmas carols for the so-called doomed millennial generation. [...] [T]his EP has the power to melt any trace of snow that's piling up on your front porch. ... There's a playful, eflish energy about ["True Love"] that makes you want to hang mistletoe everywhere to secure a smooch with that special someone."

Billboard ranked the EP as one of the Best Christmas Albums of the 21st Century, stating: "Grande's second holiday EP eschews traditional sounds of the season, opting instead for contemporary R&B grooves, trap synths and punny innuendo [...] Despite some sleigh bells and a few tossed-off references to the North Pole, this isn't your parents' holiday fare."

== Track listing ==
Christmas & Chill track listing
No.	Title	Writer(s)	Producer(s)	Length
1.	"Intro"	Ariana Grande; Victoria McCants; Thomas Lee Brown; Travis Sayles; Steven Franks; Michael D. Foster; Ryan Tedder	Brown; Sayles; Mr. Franks; The Magi	1:05
2.	"Wit It This Christmas"	Grande; McCants; Brown; Sayles; Foster; Tedder; Peter Lee Johnson	Brown; Sayles; Mr. Franks; The Magi	2:41
3.	"December"	Grande; McCants; Brown; Sayles; Franks; Foster; Tedder	Brown; Sayles; Mr. Franks; The Magi	1:56
4.	"Not Just on Christmas"	Grande; McCants; Brown; Sayles; Franks; Johnson	Brown; Sayles	2:02
5.	"True Love"	Grande; McCants; Brown; Sayles; Franks; Foster; Tedder; Johnson	Brown; Sayles; Mr. Franks; The Magi	2:46
6.	"Winter Things"	Grande; McCants; Brown; Sayles; Franks; Johnson	Brown; Sayles	2:38
Total length:				13:10

Japanese edition bonus track
No.	Title	Writer(s)	Producer(s)	Length
7.	"Into You" (Alex Ghenea remix; featuring Mac Miller)	Max Martin; Savan Kotecha; Alexander Kronlund; Ilya; Grande	Martin; Ilya; Alex Ghenea^{[a]}	4:10
Total length:				17:20

LP edition hidden track and 2023 digital reissue bonus track
No.	Title	Writer(s)	Producer(s)	Length
7.	"Santa Tell Me" (Naughty version)	Kotecha; Ilya; Grande	Ilya	3:24
Total length:				16:34

2026 Target-exclusive LP reissue bonus track
No.	Title	Writer(s)	Producer(s)	Length
7.	"Santa Tell Me"	Kotecha; Ilya; Grande	Ilya	3:24
Total length:				16:34

- ^[a] denotes a remixer

== Charts ==
Chart performance for Christmas & Chill
Chart (2015–2026)	Peak position
Australian Albums (ARIA)	49
Belgian Albums (Ultratop Flanders)	73
Belgian Albums (Ultratop Wallonia)	168
Canadian Albums (Billboard)	43
Dutch Albums (Album Top 100)	53
Latvian Albums (LaIPA)	94
Scottish Albums (Official Charts)	22
Swedish Albums (Sverigetopplistan)	30
UK Albums Sales (Official Charts)	21
US Billboard 200	34
US Top Holiday Albums (Billboard)	3
