= Christmas Kisses (The Bookends song) =

1961 song by Ray Anthony and His Bookends

Single by Ray Anthony and His Bookends
- B-side: "Let Me Walk with You"
- Released: December 1961
- Length: 1:57
- Label: Capitol
- Songwriter(s): Joseph Kruger • Henrietta Gilden
- Producer(s): Nick Venet

"Christmas Kisses" is a hit 1961 song by Ray Anthony and His Bookends, written by Joseph Kruger and Henrietta Gilden. The song has been included on many Christmas compilations such as The Best Christmas... Ever!.
