= Santa Tell Me =

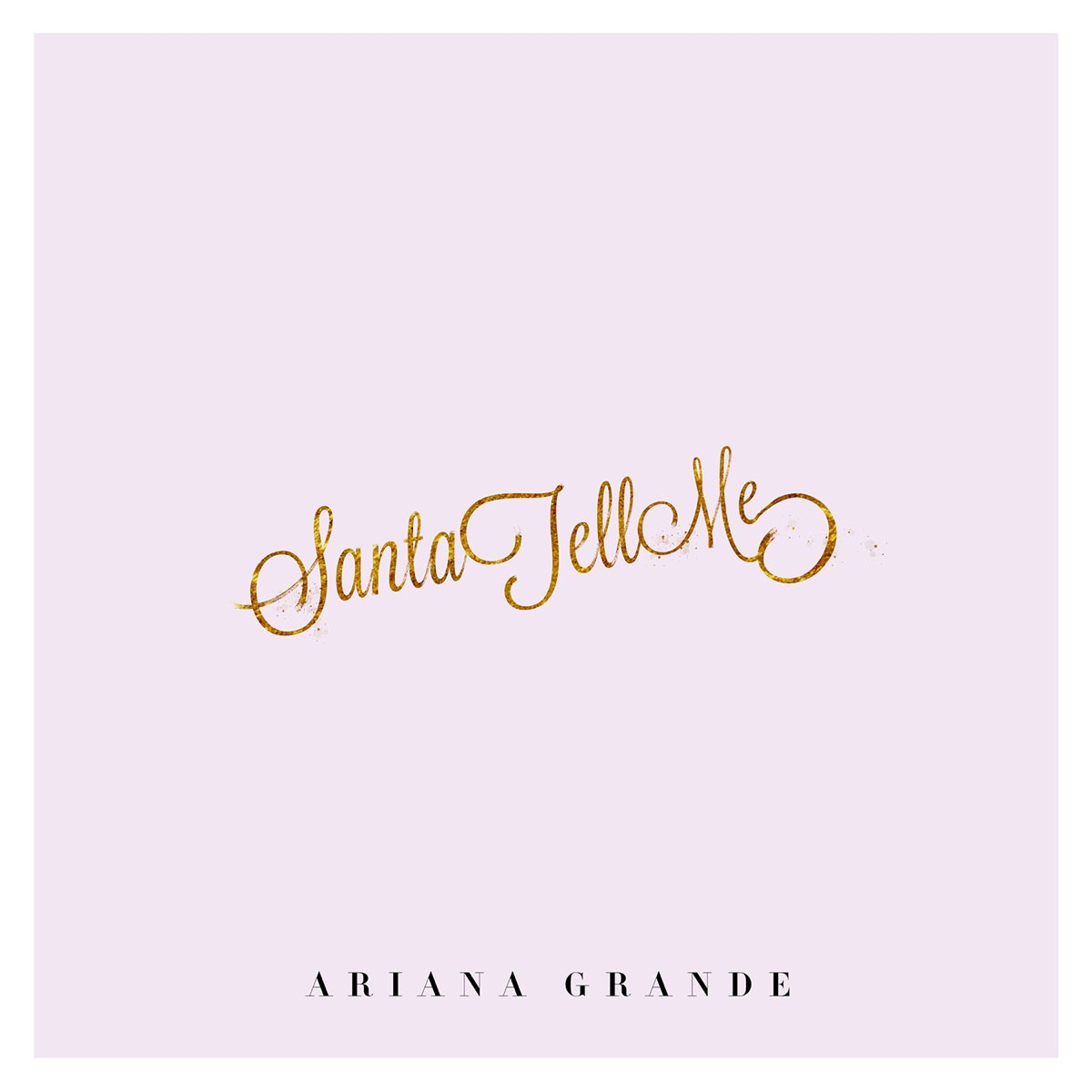

Single by Ariana Grande
- B-side: "True Love"
- Released: November 24, 2014
- Recorded: 2014
- Studio: MXM Studios (Stockholm, Sweden)
- Genre: Christmas; pop; R&B
- Length: 3:24
- Label: Republic
- Songwriters: Savan Kotecha; Ilya Salmanzadeh; Ariana Grande
- Producer: Ilya

Ariana Grande singles chronology
"Love Me Harder" (2014)	"Santa Tell Me" (2014)	"One Last Time" (2015)

Music video
- "Santa Tell Me" on YouTube

"Santa Tell Me" is a Christmas song by American singer-songwriter Ariana Grande. It was released as a single by Republic Records on November 24, 2014, and was included on the Japanese exclusive reissue of Grande's first EP Christmas Kisses (2013), as well as a "naughty version" on Grande's second EP Christmas & Chill (2015). She and Savan Kotecha co-wrote the song with its producer Ilya Salmanzadeh.

"Santa Tell Me" has become a Christmas standard, with a significant rise in popularity every Christmas season. It became the first holiday song released in the 21st century to reach the top five in the United States when it peaked at number five on the Billboard Hot 100 in 2024, ten years after its release. It has reached the top ten in numerous other countries worldwide, including Australia, Austria, Canada, Czech Republic, Denmark, Finland, Germany, Greece, Hungary, Italy, Latvia, Lithuania, Luxembourg, the Netherlands, New Zealand, Norway, Poland, Portugal, Singapore, Slovakia, South Korea, Sweden, Switzerland, and the United Kingdom, as well as the top 20 in Belgium, Croatia, Ireland, Malaysia and the Philippines. On the Billboard Global 200 chart, "Santa Tell Me" additionally peaked at number five.

Chris Marrs Piliero directed the track's music video, which was released on Grande's official Vevo on December 12, 2014. She first performed the song at the 2014 A Very Grammy Christmas concert in the Shrine Auditorium in Los Angeles on November 18, 2014.

== Background ==
Grande released her first Christmas EP titled Christmas Kisses on December 17, 2013. The extended play contains four songs, and included covers of classics, such as "Santa Baby" and Wham!'s "Last Christmas". It also contained two original songs: "Love Is Everything" and "Snow in California".

"Santa Tell Me" was first mentioned by Grande on October 28, 2014, in a livestream through Twitcam. In the livestream, she said that she did not want to do a Christmas song at first, but she changed her mind. Grande also announced that a music video would accompany "Santa Tell Me", and that this song was her favorite Christmas song out of all of the ones she had recorded so far.

She officially announced the song and its title on her Twitter page on November 13, 2014, saying, "putting out a kewt Christmas song for u on nov 24th called Santa Tell Me! lil something for the holidays :) so excited #10DaysTilSantaTellMe." It was also released to US mainstream radio.

== Promotion and release ==
Grande used the hashtag #10DaysTilSantaTellMe on Twitter to initiate the 10-day countdown of the song's release. She also performed the song for the first time on November 18, 2014, at the 2014 A Very Grammy Christmas concert in the Shrine Auditorium in Los Angeles, CA. On November 18, Republic Records released the cover art of the song, which depicts a simple light pink background with "Santa Tell Me" written in the middle in golden script. On November 21, Republic Records also released a 15-second snippet of "Santa Tell Me" through their Instagram page; the preview contained part of the chorus. Grande tweeted the last hashtag on November 23, #SantaTellMeTonight. She also posted the iTunes link of the song, which was then available for pre-order.

"Santa Tell Me" was released at midnight on November 24 on iTunes. The audio was also uploaded to Grande's official YouTube channel, ArianaGrandeVevo on November 24. Shortly after its release, the lyric video was uploaded to Vevo on November 26. It contains various photos of Grande from her childhood during Christmas.

== Composition ==
"Santa Tell Me"
A 20-second sample of "Santa Tell Me", where the chorus is heard.

"Santa Tell Me" is a Christmas song with influences of pop and R&B. It is written in the key of G major, with a moderate tempo of 96 beats per minute in common time. Grande's vocals range from the low note of B_{3} to the high note of A_{5}. Lyrically, the song features the protagonist asking Santa Claus to tell her if her new lover "really cares", and whether he will leave her like men in her past have.

Songwriters Savan Kotecha and ILYA wanted to write a Christmas song and the idea for "Santa Tell Me" came to Kotecha when he was taking a shower. In an interview with Songwriting Magazine, he said, "I was in the shower in LA and it just came into my head. I have the voice note somewhere. I just stepped out of the shower, got water all over the phone and I recorded it." The pair then swapped ideas before Grande came in and helped finish the song.

== Critical reception ==
Brian Mansfield of USA Today compared the song unfavorably to Mariah Carey's "All I Want for Christmas Is You", stating that it fell short in its attempt at becoming a "seasonal staple". Billboard placed "Santa Tell Me" at number 13 on their "The 100 Best Christmas Songs of All Time" list. It is the highest-ranking song on the list among those released in the 21st century.

== Commercial performance ==
"Santa Tell Me" has recurrently charted in several nations every year since its original release in 2014. In the United States, "Santa Tell Me" debuted at number 65 on the weekly US Billboard Hot 100 chart dated December 13, 2014, and reached number 42 in its original run. Six years later, "Santa Tell Me" re-entered the Hot 100 chart at a new high of number 39 on the chart issue dated December 19, 2020, earning Grande her 35th top 40 entry of her career. As of 2025, it has since peaked at number five, earning Grande her 23rd top ten hit and 17th top five hit on the Billboard Hot 100. "Santa Tell Me" is the most-recently released Christmas song to reach the top ten of the Hot 100 – one of the two such songs released in the 21st century to achieve this feat, the other being Kelly Clarkson's "Underneath the Tree" – and the most recently-released holiday song to reach the top five.

In its original run, "Santa Tell Me" peaked at number seven on the Billboard Adult Contemporary chart for the week ending December 27, 2014. It also topped the Billboard Holiday 100 chart on the week ending January 10, 2015, becoming only the third song, and second by a female artist, to do so since the chart's inception in 2010. As of 2024, it has been certified 4× Platinum for having sold 4 million units in the United States. On the Billboard Global 200, which tracks the most streamed and digitally sold songs in over 200 territories, "Santa Tell Me" peaked at number five, becoming Grande's third top-five hit on the chart. In Canada, "Santa Tell Me" debuted at number 73 on the Canadian Hot 100, eventually reaching a peak of number 27 in its original chart run. The track re-entered the Canadian Hot 100 chart, and has since attained a new peak of number eight in 2020, becoming Grande's 19th top ten hit in the country.

In the United Kingdom, "Santa Tell Me" entered the UK Singles Chart at number 79 for the week of December 6, 2014, originally peaking at number 68 three weeks later. In 2015, it failed to re-enter the charts; however, in 2016, the song reached number 90. In 2017, it was among many other holiday songs (such as "Driving Home for Christmas" and "Step into Christmas") reaching new chart peaks in the UK by re-entering the UK Singles Chart at number 60, and climbing to an even higher position of number 29 the following week. It eventually reached number 13 on the week of December 28, 2018, attaining the same position once again the following year (in December 2019). In November 2023, "Santa Tell Me" re-entered the UK Singles Chart for an eighth consecutive year, reaching an overall peak position of number 8 in late December. With over 220 million plays, "Santa Tell Me" is also the eighth most played Christmas track in the United Kingdom. It is one of the highest-placed Christmas songs present in the top forty and the most streamed Christmas track in the United Kingdom released since 2010.

== Legacy ==
"Santa Tell Me" has been described as a Christmas standard for its popularity in music streaming services throughout the years during the Christmas season. In a report published by the American Society of Composers, Authors and Publishers (ASCAP), "Santa Tell Me" was listed as the most-performed new and original holiday song in their repertoire in the years 2014, 2015, and 2021. Georgia Evans and Ella Doyle from Time Out discussed how Grande managed to create a Christmas "mega-hit" and how "she came closer than almost any other pop star in the 30-ish years since 'All I Want for Christmas Is You'" in terms of success. By early December 2023, the song had earned $6.8 million in royalties. In 2024, American Songwriter described "Santa Tell Me" as the fourth-highest-earning Christmas song "of the streaming age" as it had been streamed more than 239 million times and had earned its songwriters $959,000.

Due to the song's lasting impact, Grande has been dubbed the "Princess of Christmas". As of December 2024, "Santa Tell Me" is one of the 10 most streamed Christmas songs of all time and the most streamed Christmas song of the 2010s on Spotify.

The song was included in Billboard's revision of their Greatest of All Time Holiday 100 Songs at 19th position while Cosmopolitan picked "Santa Tell Me" as one of the 75 best Christmas songs of all time. It has been covered multiple times by various artists, such as Pentatonix, Nayeon from Twice, and Jessica Vosk.

== Music video ==
The official video was released on December 12, 2014. It was directed by Alfredo Flores and Jones Crow. The video features Grande with her friends dancing, laughing and giving gifts around her house along with a two-minute outtake section at the end. It surpassed 100 million views on November 26, 2016, making it Grande's fourteenth Vevo-certified music video after "Let Me Love You".

== Live performances ==
Grande first performed "Santa Tell Me" on November 18, 2014, at the A Very Grammy Christmas concert in the Shrine Auditorium in Los Angeles. The concert aired on December 5, 2014, on CBS. She also performed "Santa Tell Me" as part of the iHeartRadio Jingle Ball Tour 2014. On December 8, 2014, Grande performed the song while taping the Disney Parks Frozen Christmas Celebration TV special which aired on Christmas Day. The song was added to the setlist of the second North American leg of Grande's Sweetener World Tour, along with "December", "True Love", "Wit It This Christmas" and "Winter Things". On December 23, 2024, Grande released a live rendition of the song, recorded at Jungle City Studios in New York during sessions for Eternal Sunshine (2024), to commemorate the 10-year anniversary of the song.

== Charts ==
=== Weekly charts ===
Weekly chart performance for "Santa Tell Me"
Chart (2014–2026)	Peak position
Australia (ARIA)	5
Austria (Ö3 Austria Top 40)	6
Belarus Airplay (TopHit)	89
Belgium (Ultratop 50 Flanders)	12
Belgium Urban (Ultratop Flanders)	5
Belgium (Ultratop 50 Wallonia)	18
Canada Hot 100 (Billboard)	6
Canada AC (Billboard)	7
Canada Hot AC (Billboard)	48
CIS Airplay (TopHit)	104
Croatia (Billboard)	16
Croatia International Airplay (Top lista)	14
Croatia Christmas International Airplay (Top lista)	16
Czech Republic Singles Digital (ČNS IFPI)	5
Denmark (Tracklisten)	4
Estonia (Eesti Tipp-40)	27
Estonia Airplay (TopHit)	26
Finland (Suomen virallinen lista)	4
France (SNEP)	22
Germany (GfK)	6
Greece International Streaming (IFPI)	6
Global 200 (Billboard)	5
Hong Kong (Billboard)	18
Hungary (Rádiós Top 40)	37
Hungary (Single Top 40)	10
Hungary (Stream Top 40)	4
Iceland (Tónlistinn)	21
Ireland (IRMA)	8
Italy (FIMI)	6
Japan Hot 100 (Billboard)	24
Japan Combined Singles (Oricon)	43
Latvia Streaming (LaIPA)	4
Lithuania (AGATA)	5
Luxembourg (Billboard)	7
Malaysia Streaming (RIM)	17
Netherlands (Dutch Top 40)	28
Netherlands (Single Top 100)	3
New Zealand (Recorded Music NZ)	5
Norway (VG-lista)	9
Philippines Hot 100 (Billboard Philippines)	12
Poland (Polish Airplay Top 100)	41
Poland (Polish Streaming Top 100)	7
Portugal (AFP)	7
Romania Airplay (TopHit)	69
Scottish Singles Sales (Official Charts)	52
Singapore Streaming (RIAS)	2
Slovakia Airplay (ČNS IFPI)	65
Slovakia Singles Digital (ČNS IFPI)	7
South Africa Streaming (RISA)	39
South Korea (Gaon Chart)	5
Spain (Promusicae)	34
Sweden (Sverigetopplistan)	4
Switzerland (Schweizer Hitparade)	5
Ukraine Airplay (TopHit)	104
United Arab Emirates Streaming (IFPI)	11
UK Singles (Official Charts)	8
US Billboard Hot 100	5
US Adult Contemporary (Billboard)	7
US Adult Pop Airplay (Billboard)	39
US Holiday 100 (Billboard)	1
US Pop Airplay (Billboard)	39
US Rolling Stone Top 100	14
Vietnam (Vietnam Hot 100)	26

=== Monthly charts ===
Monthly chart performance for "Santa Tell Me"
Chart (2023–2025)	Peak position
Estonia Airplay (TopHit)	34
Lithuania Airplay (TopHit)	26

=== Year-end charts ===
Year-end chart performance for "Santa Tell Me"
Chart (2015)	Position
South Korea International (Gaon)	45
Chart (2016)	Position
South Korea International (Gaon)	61
Chart (2017)	Position
South Korea International (Gaon)	24
Chart (2018)	Position
South Korea International (Gaon)	20
Chart (2020)	Position
Hungary (Stream Top 40)	72
Chart (2021)	Position
Hungary (Stream Top 40)	90
South Korea (Gaon)	149
Chart (2022)	Position
Global 200 (Billboard)	193
Chart (2023)	Position
Denmark (Tracklisten)	99
Global 200 (Billboard)	194
Hungary (Single Top 40)	52
US Streaming Songs (Billboard)	72
Chart (2024)	Position
Austria (Ö3 Austria Top 40)	66
Global 200 (Billboard)	198
Chart (2025)	Position
Germany (GfK)	91
Global 200 (Billboard)	185
Switzerland (Schweizer Hitparade)	98

=== All-time charts ===
All-time chart performance for "Santa Tell Me"
Chart	Position
US Holiday 100 (Billboard)	19

== Certifications ==
Certifications for "Santa Tell Me"
Region	Certification	Certified units/sales
Australia (ARIA)	3× Platinum	210,000^{‡}
Austria (IFPI Austria)	3× Platinum	90,000^{‡}
Brazil (Pro-Música Brasil)	Platinum	60,000^{‡}
Canada (Music Canada)	6× Platinum	480,000^{‡}
Denmark (IFPI Danmark)	4× Platinum	360,000^{‡}
Germany (BVMI)	3× Gold	900,000^{‡}
Hungary (MAHASZ)	Platinum	3,000^{‡}
Italy (FIMI)	2× Platinum	200,000^{‡}
New Zealand (RMNZ)	3× Platinum	90,000^{‡}
Norway (IFPI Norway)	3× Platinum	180,000^{‡}
Portugal (AFP)	2× Platinum	50,000^{‡}
Spain (Promusicae)	Platinum	60,000^{‡}
South Korea	—	2,500,000
Switzerland (IFPI Switzerland)	Gold	15,000^{‡}
United Kingdom (BPI)	4× Platinum	2,400,000^{‡}
United States (RIAA)	4× Platinum	4,000,000^{‡}
Streaming
Greece (IFPI Greece)	Platinum	2,000,000^{†}
Japan (RIAJ)	Gold	50,000,000^{†}
Sweden (GLF)	3× Platinum	24,000,000^{†}
^{‡} Sales+streaming figures based on certification alone.^{†} Streaming-only figures based on certification alone.

== Release history ==
"Santa Tell Me" release history
Region	Date	Format(s)	Label	Ref.
Various	November 24, 2014	Digital download	Republic	
Italy	December 13, 2024	Radio airplay	Island	
United Kingdom	December 16, 2024	7-inch vinyl; cassette; CD	Republic	
France	December 20, 2024	7-inch vinyl	Polydor	
United States	December 20, 2024	7-inch vinyl; cassette; CD	Republic	

== See also ==
- List of popular Christmas singles in the United States
