= Christmas Kisses (EP) =

EP by Ariana Grande
- Released: December 13, 2013
- Recorded: 2013
- Studios: Brandon's Way Recording Studios (Los Angeles, California)
- Genre: Christmas
- Length: 13:15 (standard); 16:29 (special)
- Label: Republic
- Producers: The Rascals; Kenneth "Babyface" Edmonds; Antonio Dixon

Ariana Grande chronology
Yours Truly (2013)	Christmas Kisses (2013)	My Everything (2014)

Singles from Christmas Kisses
- 1. "Last Christmas" Released: November 19, 2013; 2. "Love Is Everything" Released: November 26, 2013; 3. "Snow in California" Released: December 3, 2013; 4. "Santa Baby" Released: December 10, 2013

Christmas Kisses is the debut Christmas record and extended play (EP) by American singer Ariana Grande. It was released on December 13, 2013, in most countries, and on December 17, 2013, in the United States, as a collection of two covers of classic Christmas songs, and two original songs. On December 3, 2014, the Japanese special edition was released for CD and two days later for digital download. It peaked at number twenty-five on the Oricon chart. The EP went on to sell 68,871 copies in the US and over 405,000 copies worldwide.

== Background and release ==
On November 6, 2013, Grande announced via Twitter she would be releasing new music each week leading up to Christmas, beginning with a cover of Wham!'s "Last Christmas": "I'm releasing new music for Christmas! New song every week as a countdown to the holidays starting Nov 19. Beyond excited to share them w/ U! The 1st song #LastChristmas out Nov 19. I can't wait for u to hear our spin on it. There will be originals as well! Hope u love the music."

"Last Christmas" was released as the lead single, opening up to positive reviews and was critically acclaimed for its "R&B and Soul spin" on the Christmas classic. On the final week of November, Grande released an original Christmas song, titled "Love Is Everything", and it was also revealed Grande would be releasing Christmas Kisses later that month. In the first week of December, Grande released another original Christmas song "Snow in California" and was later followed by a cover of the 1953 classic "Santa Baby", which features Grande's former Victorious co-star Elizabeth Gillies.

In November 2014, Grande announced she would release the special edition of the EP exclusively in Japan. The special edition included a new track "Santa Tell Me", released on November 24, 2014. The song was written by Grande, Savan Kotecha and Ilya Salmanzadeh and peaked at number 17 on the US Billboard Hot 100 and number 11 on the UK Singles Chart. On December 3, the Japanese special edition was released on CD, and two days later on the Japanese iTunes Store. It peaked at number 25 on the Oricon Albums Chart, becoming her third album to peak on that chart, following Yours Truly (2013) and My Everything (2014).

== Promotion ==
Preceding the release of her Christmas EP, she gave a series of performances, including at the 87th annual Macy's Thanksgiving Day Parade, NBC New York's Rockefeller Center Christmas Tree lighting broadcast, the KIIS-FM Jingle Ball in Los Angeles' Staples Center and Z100's Jingle Ball event at Madison Square Garden in New York City. She also sang at Dick Clark's New Year's Rockin' Eve, with Big Sean and Mac Miller.

== Track listing ==
Christmas Kisses track listing
No.	Title	Writer(s)	Length
1.	"Last Christmas"	George Michael	3:23
2.	"Love Is Everything"	Antonio Dixon; Khristopher Riddick-Tynes; Leon Thomas III; Kenneth "Babyface" Edmonds	3:33
3.	"Snow in California"	Dixon; Riddick-Tynes; Thomas; Edmonds	3:27
4.	"Santa Baby" (featuring Liz Gillies)	Philip Springer; Tony Springer; Joan Javits	2:51
Total length:			13:15

Japanese special reissue edition bonus track
No.	Title	Writer(s)	Length
5.	"Santa Tell Me"	Savan Kotecha; Ilya Salmanzadeh; Ariana Grande	3:24
Total length:			16:39

== Personnel ==
Credits adapted from the Christmas Kisses liner notes.

- Ariana Grande – vocals
- Liz Gillies – vocals
- India Benet – background vocals
- Kenneth "Babyface" Edmonds – producer, guitar
- Antonio Dixon – producer, programming
- The Rascals – producers, programming
- Ivy Skoff – production coordinator
- Demonte Posey – string arrangements
- Paul Boutin – recording, mixing
- Tony Maserati – mixing
- James Krausse – engineer
- Jon Castelli – mixing engineer
- Justin Hergett – assistant mixing engineer

== Charts ==
=== Weekly charts ===
Chart performance for Christmas Kisses
Chart (2014–2025)	Peak position
Japanese Albums (Oricon)	25
New Zealand Albums (RMNZ)	16
US Top Holiday Albums (Billboard)	34

=== Singles ===
Chart performance for "Last Christmas"
Chart (2013–2025)	Peak position
Japan Hot 100 (Billboard)	73
Netherlands (Single Top 100)	59
Portugal (AFP)	155
South Korea (Gaon)	24
UK Singles (Official Charts)	92
US Billboard Hot 100	96
US Adult Contemporary (Billboard)	26
US Holiday 100 (Billboard)	32
US Holiday Digital Song Sales (Billboard)	1
US Holiday Streaming Songs (Billboard)	22

Chart performance for "Love is Everything"
Chart (2013)	Peak position
Netherlands (Single Top 100)	89
UK Singles (Official Charts)	132
US Holiday 100 (Billboard)	15
US Holiday Digital Song Sales (Billboard)	2

Chart performance for "Snow in California"
Chart (2013)	Peak position
Netherlands (Single Top 100)	93
UK Singles (Official Charts)	151
US Holiday 100 (Billboard)	33
US Holiday Digital Song Sales (Billboard)	4

Chart performance for "Santa Baby"
Chart (2013–2025)	Peak position
Australia (ARIA)	77
Czech Republic Singles Digital (ČNS IFPI)	76
Greece International Digital Singles (IFPI)	90
Hungary (Stream Top 40)	29
Netherlands (Single Top 100)	53
Portugal (AFP)	77
Slovakia Singles Digital (ČNS IFPI)	72
Sweden Heatseeker (Sverigetopplistan)	16
Switzerland (Schweizer Hitparade)	77
UK Singles (Official Charts)	155
US Holiday 100 (Billboard)	36
US Holiday Digital Song Sales (Billboard)	5

== Release history ==
Region	Date	Edition	Format	Label	Ref.
United Kingdom	December 13, 2013	Standard	Digital download	Universal Music	
United States	December 17, 2013	Standard	Digital download	Republic	
Japan	December 3, 2014	Special	CD	Universal Music	
Japan	December 5, 2014	Special	Digital download	Universal Music	
