= K Bye for Now (SWT Live) =

Live album by Ariana Grande
- Released: December 23, 2019
- Recorded: March–October 2019
- Length: 93:17
- Label: Republic
- Producers: Ariana Grande; Natural

Ariana Grande chronology
Thank U, Next (2019)	K Bye for Now (SWT Live) (2019)	Positions (2020)

K Bye for Now (SWT Live) is the first live album by American singer Ariana Grande. It was released on December 23, 2019, featuring Grande's setlist from her Sweetener World Tour in 2019, which contains guest appearances from Big Sean, Childish Gambino, Nicki Minaj and Zedd. All of its tracks were produced by Grande and Natural. The album reached number 79 on the Billboard 200. On June 12, 2021, CD and vinyl versions of the album were released for Record Store Day.

== Background ==
Grande embarked on the Sweetener World Tour in March 2019 to support her fourth and fifth studio albums, Sweetener (2018) and Thank U, Next (2019). On October 17, Grande tweeted a photo of her editing vocal files on her laptop and wrote "about to start coming thru and picking my favorite adlibs / performance moments on this flight ... just in case u want a live album one day". She continued to tease the album in November by sharing more photos onto Instagram of audio files named after different cities she performed in. On December 1, Grande shared an update on the production of the album.

On December 10, 2019, Grande responded affirmatively to a fan that had asked if a live album would arrive before the year's end. The album was put up for pre-saving on Spotify the following day under the tentative title SWT Live, and Grande shared the track listing on her Instagram. On December 22, Grande revealed on Twitter that the album would be titled K Bye for Now and would be released later that night, following the final show of the tour in Inglewood, California.

== Critical reception ==
Professional ratings
Review scores
Source	Rating
AllMusic	4/5 stars
Pitchfork	7.4/10

Dani Blum from Pitchfork gave the album a rating of 7.4 out of 10 stating, "Grande's live album is both a capsule and a capstone, encompassing a nine-month, 102-show tour at what might be the peak of her career."

== Commercial performance ==
K Bye for Now (SWT Live) debuted at number 97 on the Billboard 200. As of June 2020, the live album has sold 4,000 copies in the United States. The album was released to music streaming and digital platforms. The album re-entered the Billboard 200 at number 79 in June 2021, when CDs and vinyl copies of the album were released.

== Track listing ==
All tracks are noted as "live", and produced by Grande and Natural.

K Bye for Now (SWT Live) track listing
No.	Title	Writer(s)	Length
1.	"Raindrops (An Angel Cried)"	Bob Gaudio	0:43
2.	"God Is a Woman"	Ariana Grande; Ilya Salmanzadeh; Max Martin; Savan Kotecha; Rickard Göransson	3:33
3.	"Bad Idea"	Grande; Salmanzadeh; Martin; Kotecha; Peter Svensson	3:32
4.	"Break Up with Your Girlfriend, I'm Bored"	Grande; Salmanzadeh; Martin; Kotecha; Kandi Burruss; Kevin Briggs	3:43
5.	"R.E.M"	Grande; Pharrell Williams	2:57
6.	"Be Alright"	Grande; Thomas Brown; Victoria McCants; Khaled Rohaim; Lewis Hughes; Nicholas Audino; Willie Tafa	2:54
7.	"Sweetener"	Grande; Williams	2:54
8.	"Successful"	Grande; Williams	2:05
9.	"Side to Side" (featuring Nicki Minaj)	Grande; Salmanzadeh; Martin; Kotecha; Onika Maraj; Alexander Kronlund; Ophlin Russell; Thom Bell; William Hart; Winston Riley	4:20
10.	"7 Rings"	Grande; Brown; McCants; Tayla Parx; Charles Anderson; Michael Foster; Kimberly Krysiuk; Njomza Vitia; Oscar Hammerstein II; Richard Rodgers	3:46
11.	"Love Me Harder"	Martin; Kotecha; Svensson; Abel Tesfaye; Ahmad Balshe; Ali Payami	1:23
12.	"Breathin"	Grande; Kotecha; Svensson; Salmanzadeh	3:28
13.	"Needy"	Grande; Brown; McCants; Parx	2:54
14.	"Fake Smile"	Grande; Andrew Wansel; Joseph Frierson; Justin Tranter; Kennedi Lykken; Mary Lou Frierson; Nathan Perez; Priscilla Renea	3:25
15.	"Make Up"	Grande; Brown; McCants; Parx; Brian Baptiste	2:18
16.	"Right There" (featuring Big Sean)	Grande; Al Sherrod Lambert; Carmen Reece; Harmony Samuels; Joseph Bereal; James "J-Doe" Smith; Jeff Lorber; Sean Anderson	1:39
17.	"You'll Never Know"	Antonio Dixon; Kenneth Edmonds; Khristopher Riddick-Tynes; Leon Thomas III	1:21
18.	"Break Your Heart Right Back" (featuring Childish Gambino)	Wansel; Bernard Edwards; Christopher Wallace; Donald Glover; Kirby Dockery; Mason Betha; Nile Rodgers; Sean Combs; Steven Jordan; Warren Felder	2:14
19.	"NASA"	Grande; Brown; McCants; Parx; C. Anderson	3:05
20.	"Tattooed Heart"	Grande; Dixon; Edmonds; Riddick-Tynes; Thomas; Matt Squire; Sean Foreman	3:23
21.	"Only 1"	Grande; Brown; McCants; Travis Sayles; Dennis Jenkins	2:42
22.	"Goodnight n Go"	Grande; Brown; McCants; C. Anderson; Foster; Imogen Heap	3:08
23.	"Get Well Soon"	Grande; Williams	3:27
24.	"In My Head" (interlude)	Grande; Wansel; Perez; Brittany Coney; Denisia Andrews; Lindel Deon Nelson Jr.; Jameel Roberts	2:30
25.	"Everytime"	Grande; Salmanzadeh; Martin; Kotecha	2:11
26.	"The Light Is Coming" (featuring Nicki Minaj)	Grande; Williams; Maraj	2:10
27.	"Into You"	Grande; Salmanzadeh; Martin; Kotecha; Kronlund	2:59
28.	"My Heart Belongs to Daddy" (interlude)	Cole Porter	1:47
29.	"Dangerous Woman"	Martin; Johan Carlsson; Ross Golan	3:53
30.	"Break Free"	Martin; Kotecha; Anton Zaslavski	2:31
31.	"No Tears Left to Cry"	Grande; Salmanzadeh; Martin; Kotecha	3:53
32.	"Thank U, Next"	Grande; Brown; McCants; Parx; C. Anderson; Foster; Krysiuk; Vitia	6:29
Total length:			93:17

Notes

- Live version of "Thank U, Next" contains an excerpt from "Video" by India Arie

== Personnel ==
=== Production ===
- Ariana Grande – vocals, lyrics, composer, production, vocal production, vocal arranger, mixing, engineering
- Natural – production, musical director, mixing, engineering
- Randy Merrill – mastering engineer
- Tommy Brown – composer
- Mr. Franks – composer
- Max Martin – composer
- Victoria Monét – composer
- Savan Kotecha – composer
- Ilya Salmanzadeh – composer
- Pop Wansel – composer
- Brian Malik Baptiste – composer
- Babyface – composer
- The Rascals – composer
- Pharrell Williams – composer
- Cole Potter – composer
- Charles Anderson – composer
- Nicholas Audino – composer
- Anton Zaslavskli – composer

=== Musicians ===
- Ariana Grande – vocals
- Aaron Spears – drums
- Natural – guitar, keyboard
- Eric Ingram – bass, synth bass
- Nelson Jackson – keyboard

== Charts ==
Chart performance for K Bye for Now (SWT Live)
Chart (2019–2021)	Peak position
Australian Albums (ARIA)	89
Dutch Albums (Album Top 100)	57
French Albums (SNEP)	109
Portuguese Albums (AFP)	12
Scottish Albums (Official Charts)	41
Swiss Albums (Schweizer Hitparade)	93
US Billboard 200	79

== Release history ==
Release dates and formats for K Bye for Now (SWT Live)
Region	Date	Format	Label	Ref.
Various	December 23, 2019	Digital download; streaming	Republic	
United States	June 12, 2021	CD; LP	Republic	
Japan	July 14, 2021	CD	Universal	
