= Ariana Grande: Excuse Me, I Love You =

- Film poster
- Directed by: Paul Dugdale
- Produced by: Simon Fisher; Liz Garbus; Dan Cogan
- Starring: Ariana Grande
- Cinematography: Thorsten Thielow; Alfredo Flores
- Edited by: Simon Bryant; Benjamin Wainwright-Pearce; Tony Zajkowski
- Production companies: Den of Thieves; Scooter Braun Films; Story Syndicate; Si-Fi Films
- Distributed by: Netflix
- Release date: December 21, 2020
- Running time: 97 minutes
- Country: United States
- Language: English

Ariana Grande: Excuse Me, I Love You (stylized in all lowercase) is a 2020 American concert film that follows Ariana Grande on-stage and behind the scenes of the Sweetener World Tour in 2019. The film was released on December 21, 2020, on Netflix, in commemoration of the first anniversary of the tour's conclusion. The release of the film was preceded by the live album K Bye for Now (SWT Live) (2019), which was released a year prior and features audio recordings from said tour.

== Background ==
On December 8, 2020, Grande teased an upcoming concert film with three tweets posted via her Twitter account. On December 9, 2020, Grande took to social media to confirm an upcoming concert film with streaming service Netflix, while also confirming the release date of December 21, 2020. On December 10, 2020, the official trailer for Excuse Me, I Love You was released on Netflix, and subsequently on her Twitter, Instagram and YouTube channel. On December 14, Netflix announced that there would be profile icons of Grande available to Netflix users alongside the release of the film.

== Production ==
Excuse Me, I Love You was directed by Paul Dugdale and executive produced by Grande herself and Scooter Braun, Allison Kaye, Scott Manson for SB Projects, and Jesse Ignjatovic and Evan Prager for Den of Thieves. Samon Fisher, Liz Garbus and Dan Cogan produced, and Paul Dugdale, Ray Rock and James Shin co-executive produced.

Most of the concert scenes were shot during Grande's show at The O2 Arena in London, England, United Kingdom.

== Reception ==
On review aggregator website Rotten Tomatoes, the film has an approval rating of 50% based on eight critics, with an average rating of 5.4/10. On Metacritic, the film received a weighted average score of 70 out of 100 based on 4 reviews, indicating "generally positive reviews". Chris Azzopardi of The New York Times gave plaudits to Grande's "charming, relatable" persona, and stated that the film captures the singer in "a variety of other off-the-cuff moments that give you the impression that this Grammy winner could be your bestie".

NME writer Hannah Mylrea gave the film 4 stars out of 5, commenting that Excuse Me, I Love You may not be the most revelatory music film, but "it doesn't need to be", since it is "90 minutes of euphoric pure pop". Johnny Loftus of Decider complimented Grande's charisma, professionalism, and the film's camera work. Dubbing the film "a gift to pop stans", Mashable's Rachel Thompson praised the film for how it reminds of the "simpler times" prior to the COVID-19 pandemic, and admired its setlist. However, she underscored the absence of rehearsal videos like those in Beyoncé's Homecoming (2019) or Taylor Swift's Reputation Stadium Tour (2018), or like the songwriting footage found in Swift's Miss Americana (2020) and Lady Gaga's Five Foot Two (2017).

Rating the film a C-grade, IndieWire critic David Ehlrich compared Excuse Me, I Love You to a "commercial for a well-manufactured human product", and described it as "a lame attempt to peek behind the curtain". He thought that the film fails to achieve its full potential, unlike the intimacy of Miss Americana. Scoring the film 2 out of 5 stars, Jennifer Green of Common Sense Media pointed out that Grande has "seemingly effortless vocal talent", but the concert is "so meticulously choreographed and staged that they feel almost as much about the mise-en-scène as the music". Green downplayed the film's editing, and highlighted the presence of superficial chats instead of insight into Grande's life and personality.

== Awards and nominations ==
Year	Award	Category	Result	Ref.
2021	MTV Movie & TV Awards	Best Music Documentary	Nominated	

== Setlist ==
1. "Raindrops (An Angel Cried)"
2. "God Is a Woman"
3. "Bad Idea"
4. "Break Up with Your Girlfriend, I'm Bored"
5. "R.E.M."
6. "Be Alright"
7. "Sweetener"
8. "Side to Side"
9. "7 Rings"
10. "Love Me Harder"
11. "Breathin"
12. "Needy"
13. "Make Up"
14. "Right There"
15. "You'll Never Know"
16. "Break Your Heart Right Back"
17. "NASA"
18. "Tattooed Heart"
19. "Everytime"
20. "The Light Is Coming"
21. "Into You"
22. "Dangerous Woman"
23. "Break Free"
24. "No Tears Left to Cry"
25. "Thank U, Next"
