= The Sweetener Sessions =

2018 concert series by Ariana Grande

- Promotional tour by Ariana Grande
- Promotional poster
- Location: England; U.S.
- Associated album: Sweetener
- Start date: August 20, 2018
- End date: September 4, 2018
- Legs: 2
- No. of shows: 4

Ariana Grande concert chronology
- Dangerous Woman Tour (2017); The Sweetener Sessions (2018); Sweetener World Tour (2019)

The Sweetener Sessions (officially American Express x Ariana Grande: The Sweetener Sessions in the United States, and Capital Up Close Presents Ariana Grande in the United Kingdom) was a brief four-show promotional tour by American singer Ariana Grande, in support of her fourth studio album Sweetener (2018). Carried out over the 18 days following the release of the album, it began on August 20, 2018, in New York City, United States and ended on September 4, in London, England. It was followed by her 100-show Sweetener World Tour in 2019.

== Background ==
Three performances took place at New York City's Irving Plaza, The Vic Theatre in Chicago, and Los Angeles' Ace Theater between August 20 and 25, 2018, following the release of her studio album Sweetener.

Tickets for the intimate shows were made available exclusively to American Express cardholders.

The New York City concert occurred after her appearance at the 2018 MTV Video Music Awards, where she performed "God Is a Woman".

On August 28, 2018, a London concert was announced in partnership with Capital Up Close. Tickets to the show were not available for purchase, instead Capital listeners could win tickets in competition rounds.

== Set lists ==
=== August 20, 2018 ===
1. "Breathin'"
2. "R.E.M"
3. "Better Off"
4. "Sweetener"
5. "Successful"
6. "Pete Davidson"
7. "Borderline"
8. "Everytime"
9. "Goodnight n Go"
10. "God Is a Woman"
11. "Get Well Soon"
12. "No Tears Left to Cry"
13. "Raindrops (An Angel Cried)"

=== August 22, 2018 ===
1. "Raindrops (An Angel Cried)"
2. "Blazed"
3. "Goodnight n Go"
4. "Honeymoon Avenue" (original version)
5. "Everytime"
6. "Sweetener"
7. "Successful"
8. "Pete Davidson"
9. "Better Off"
10. "Breathin'"
11. "God Is a Woman"
12. "R.E.M"
13. "Get Well Soon"
14. "No Tears Left to Cry"
15. "Be Alright" (a cappella)
16. "Right There" (a cappella)
17. "Tattooed Heart" (a cappella)
18. "Be My Baby" (a cappella)
19. "Best Mistake" (a cappella)
20. "Break Your Heart Right Back" (a cappella)
21. "One Last Time" (a cappella)

=== August 25, 2018 ===
1. "Breathin'"
2. "Only 1"
3. "Sweetener"
4. "Successful"
5. "Blazed"
6. "Goodnight n Go"
7. "Be My Baby" (a cappella)
8. "Everytime"
9. "R.E.M"
10. "Borderline"
11. "Better Off"
12. "Pete Davidson"
13. "God Is a Woman"
14. "No Tears Left to Cry"
15. "Get Well Soon"
16. "Raindrops (An Angel Cried)"

=== September 4, 2018 ===
1. "Raindrops (An Angel Cried)"
2. "Blazed"
3. "R.E.M"
4. "God Is a Woman"
5. "Better Off"
6. "Everytime"
7. "Goodnight n Go"
8. "Sweetener"
9. "Successful"
10. "Pete Davidson"
11. "Honeymoon Avenue" (original version)
12. "You'll Never Know" (a cappella)
13. "Borderline"
14. "No Tears Left to Cry"
15. "Tattooed Heart" (a cappella)
16. "Get Well Soon"
17. "Breathin"
18. "One Last Time" (a cappella)
19. "Best Mistake" (a cappella)
20. "Why Try" (a cappella)
21. "Right There" (a cappella)

== Shows ==
List of concerts, showing date, city, country and venue
| Date | City | Country | Venue |
|---|---|---|---|
| August 20, 2018 | New York City | United States | Irving Plaza |
| August 22, 2018 | Chicago | United States | The Vic Theatre |
| August 25, 2018 | Los Angeles | United States | Ace Hotel |
| September 4, 2018 | London | England | KOKO |

== Reception ==
The Guardian's Caroline Sullivan rated the London show four out of five stars.
