= Sweetener (album) =

Studio album by Ariana Grande
- Released: August 17, 2018
- Studios: MXM; The Lunchtable (Los Angeles); Chalice; Conway; EastWest (Hollywood); Glenwood Place (Burbank); Jungle City; Germano (New York City); Midnight Blue; South Beach (Miami); Wolf Cousins; MXM (Stockholm); District 4–12 (Northridge)
- Genres: Pop; R&B; trap
- Length: 47:25
- Label: Republic
- Producers: Charles Anderson; Brian Malik Baptiste; Tommy Brown; Michael Foster; Hit-Boy; Ilya; Max Martin; Pharrell Williams

Ariana Grande chronology
The Best (2017)	Sweetener (2018)	Thank U, Next (2019)

Singles from Sweetener
- 1. "No Tears Left to Cry" Released: April 20, 2018; 2. "God Is a Woman" Released: July 13, 2018; 3. "Breathin" Released: September 18, 2018

Sweetener is the fourth studio album by American singer-songwriter Ariana Grande. It was released on August 17, 2018, through Republic Records. Grande co-wrote all the songs on the album except for the first track, and its production was handled by Pharrell Williams, Charles Anderson, Hit-Boy, Ilya Salmanzadeh, and Max Martin, with guest features from Williams, Nicki Minaj, and Missy Elliott.

The album explores themes of healing, optimism, romance, sexual intimacy, unhealthy relationships, anxiety, and perseverance through hardships. Primarily a pop, R&B, and trap record, it incorporates elements of house, funk, neo soul, and hip hop music that mainly consists of uptempo tunes and downtempo ballads. Sweetener received critical acclaim upon its release, favoring the experimental nature of its production. Some critics considered it a vital record in Grande's career due to its subject matter. It won Best Pop Vocal Album at the 61st Annual Grammy Awards, scoring Grande her first Grammy Award. Sweetener featured in numerous publications' year-end music lists of the best albums of 2018, and was subsequently inducted in decade-end lists of the 2010s.

Three singles were released from Sweetener, all of which reached the top-fifteen of the US Billboard Hot 100. The lead single, "No Tears Left to Cry", debuted and peaked at number three, while the second and third singles, "God Is a Woman" and "Breathin", reached numbers eight and twelve, respectively. Sweetener debuted at number one on the US Billboard 200, making it Grande's third album to reach the summit. It was certified double platinum by the Recording Industry Association of America (RIAA), and topped charts in other countries including Australia, Canada, Ireland, New Zealand, and the United Kingdom. Grande ventured on a four-show promotional tour, the Sweetener Sessions, following the album's release. To further support both Sweetener and its successor, Thank U, Next (2019), Grande embarked on the Sweetener World Tour in 2019.

== Background and recording ==
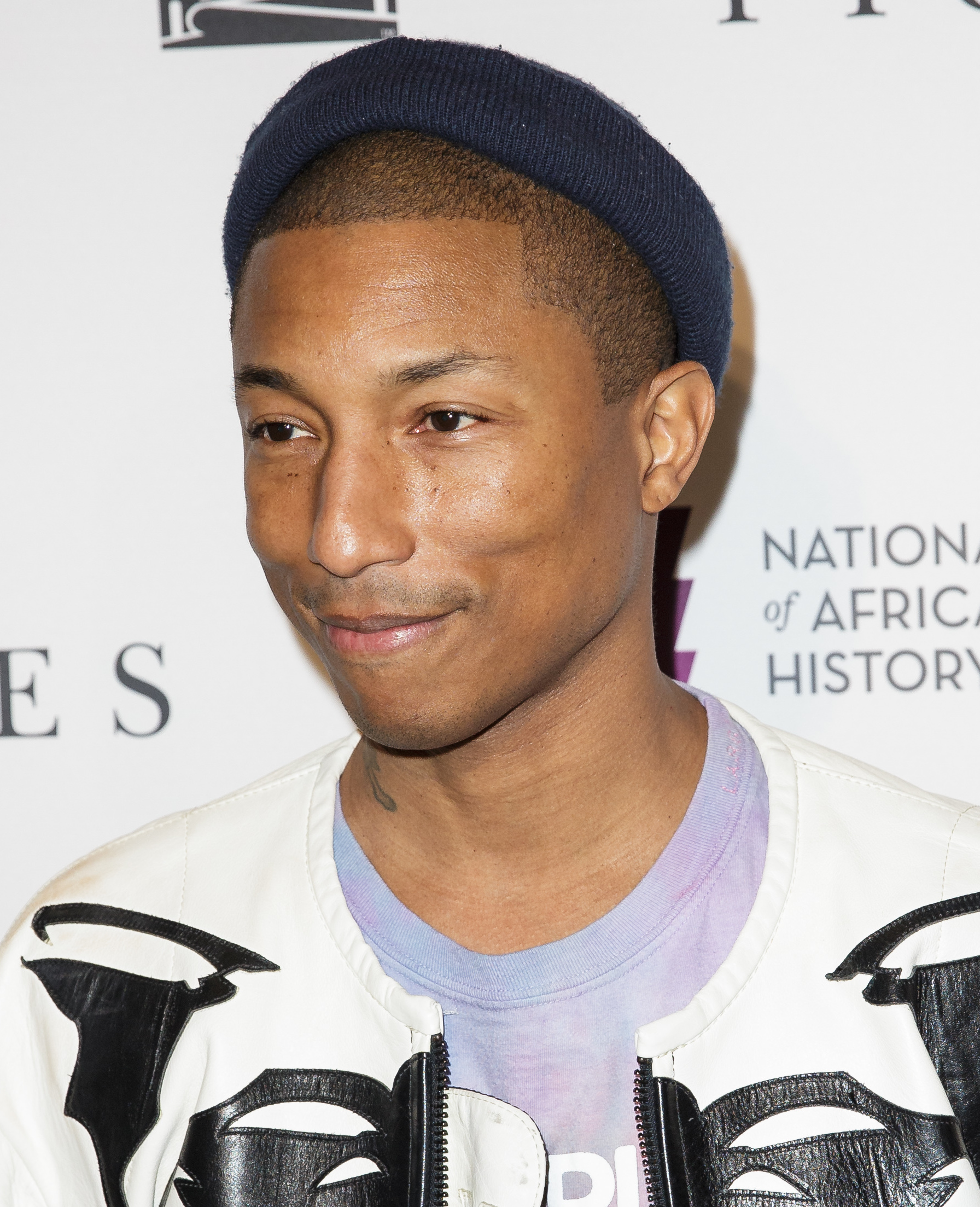
American musician Pharrell Williams performed on the album, producing and writing multiple tracks.

On May 20, 2016, Grande released her third studio album Dangerous Woman, which was met with positive reviews and peaked at number 2 in the United States. Work on Sweetener commenced around early July of that year, the first song created being the title track, co-written and produced by American musician Pharrell Williams. On November 13, Grande stated on Snapchat that she had been recording and compiling songs she "really really like[d]", though she remained uncertain as to whether the album was complete. In December 2017, Grande confirmed that she was still working on the album.

Grande's manager Scooter Braun told Variety magazine that Sweetener has a more mature sound: "It's time for [Grande] to sing the songs that define her... Whitney, Mariah, Adele – when they sing, that's their song. Ariana has big vocal moments; it's time for her song." In an interview with the Los Angeles Times, Williams described Grande's forthcoming album as "pretty amazing", adding that "the things that she has to say on this album" were "pretty next-level". Producers Max Martin and Savan Kotecha were later confirmed to collaborate with Grande on the album. In a 2018 interview with American radio personality Zach Sang, Grande mentioned that she had recorded over 30 songs for the album that did not make the final cut, including "On Top of Everything". According to Time magazine's interview published May 2018 by Sam Lansky, Sweetener was the first album that Grande "took the lead on writing".

== Music and lyrics ==
It's definitely more personal. You know, I feel like Dangerous Woman was a grown-up My Everything, and this is a grown-up Yours Truly.

— Grande, on the album's sound

Sweetener is a pop, R&B and trap record that includes elements of house, funk, neo soul and hip hop music on its beats and productions. The melodies and harmonies on the album are diverse and include uptempo songs and downtempo, sentimental ballads. Stephen Thomas Erlewine from AllMusic stated that the album "deepens the R&B inclinations of 2016's Dangerous Woman". In an interview with Zach Sang, Grande said: "The thing that I love most about this project sonically, is that all I really did was sing in my sweet lower register".

The album begins with 38-second a cappella intro "Raindrops (An Angel Cried)", written by Bob Gaudio, and originally performed by Frankie Valli and the Four Seasons. "Blazed" is a high tempo funk-influenced song, featuring vocals and background vocals by Williams, who also produced the track. "The Light Is Coming" is a new wave and dance song with hip hop and R&B elements. Grande sings over a jittery beat used with quick drums and synths and heavily sampled CNN clip of a man shouting at former senator Arlen Specter at a town hall meeting in Pennsylvania in 2009, concerning healthcare ("You wouldn't let anybody speak and instead"). Spin's Israel Daramola described the song as a "glitchy, thumping" dance record with a sample that highlights Grande's "nursery rhyme-style melody". "R.E.M." is an R&B song that is built over a smooth doo-wop beat. She later confirmed on Twitter that it is based on American singer Beyoncé's demo titled "Wake Up", a leftover from her 2013 self-titled album.

An R&B ballad "God Is a Woman" contains lyrics about female sexual empowerment and spirituality; Time described the song as "an anthemic, sultry banger". A trap-pop song, "God Is a Woman" contains influences of reggae, while "Successful" is a 1990s-esque neo soul song that has elements of gospel and trap. "Everytime" is a trap-pop track that contains a pop-rap chorus, while "Breathin" is a dance-pop song that contains influences of synth-pop. The Independent called the latter an "emotional highlight" and that it is a "mental health bop over a good, solid pop beat". Lyrically, it addresses anxiety and mental health struggles.

"No Tears Left to Cry" is a dance-pop and disco song with a UK garage beat. Lyrically, it centers on resilience and optimism, with Grande expressing a determination to move beyond negativity and embrace life despite adversity. "Borderline" is a 1990s contemporary R&B song that features American rapper Missy Elliott, and "Better Off" discusses a toxic relationship with Mac Miller. "Goodnight n Go" is an EDM song with deep house and tropical influences; it incorporates elements of Imogen Heap's "Goodnight and Go". In an interview with Billboard, Heap said that "it feels like a gift", adding: "When somebody that famous picks up on a song that has had its day and gives it a second life, it's a real gift. I think she's done a lovely version of it." "Pete Davidson" is about her then-fiancé, Pete Davidson. "Get Well Soon" is a soul-ballad that has a laid back R&B melody with lyrics that talk about Grande's personal anxiety and trauma following the Manchester Arena bombing. At the end of the song, 40 seconds of silence are played as a tribute to the twenty-two victims of the bombing, bringing the duration of the track to 5:22, a reference to the date of the bombing, May 22.

== Promotion and release ==
=== Distribution and packaging ===
Sweetener was released on August 17, 2018, via Republic Records in CD, digital download, and streaming formats. A cassette edition was issued exclusively in the United Kingdom by Island Records on August 21, before receiving an international release on October 15. A vinyl LP edition was released in November through Republic. About the album's title, Grande explained: "It's kind of about like bringing light to a situation, or to someone's life, or somebody else who brings light to your life, sweetening the situation." The inspiration for the upside-down theme in cover artwork of Sweetener was inspired by a friend who told her he "even love[d] it upside-down" while looking at one of the images. She further stated: "At the time I had been feeling very 'upside-down' for a while & the simplicity of that was like, 'oh duh, wow, my bestie a genius.' Everything clicked after that."

American director Dave Meyers shot the cover artwork, who also directed the music videos for the album's first two singles—"No Tears Left to Cry" and "God Is a Woman"—as well as the promotional single "The Light Is Coming". The artwork was the first in her discography to be in color, which she said was because it reflected both "a new chapter" in her career and a brighter period in her life. In 2023, Joe Lynch of Billboard named it the 98th best album cover of all time.

=== Marketing ===
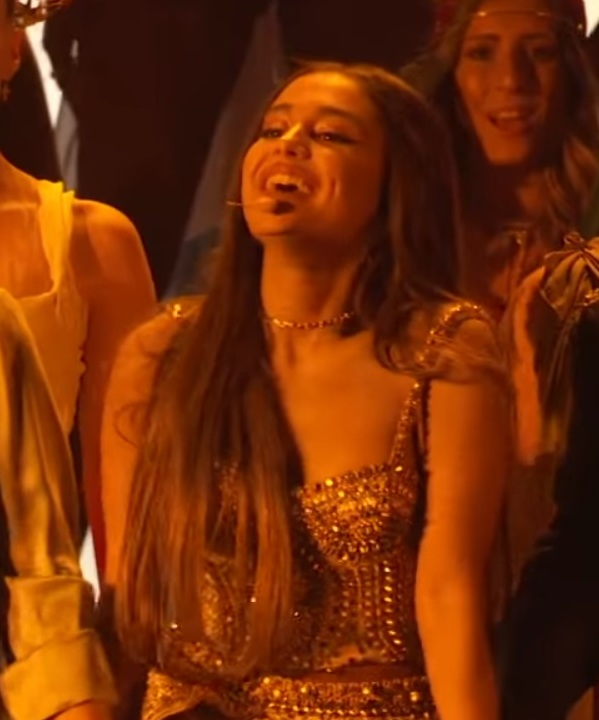
Grande performing "God Is a Woman" on 20 August 2018 during the 2018 MTV Video Music Awards

Grande shared several pictures of her in the studio throughout the year on December 28, 2017, and a snippet from the album on her Instagram three days later, with the caption "see u next year"; it was later revealed that the track was the closing track on the album, titled "Get Well Soon".

Grande performed "God Is a Woman" at Coachella on April 21, 2018, as a guest during the performance of Norwegian DJ Kygo. In May, she appeared on The Tonight Show Starring Jimmy Fallon and the 2018 Billboard Music Awards, the former where she announced the album's title and its release date. The album's pre-order, title, and release date were announced during her set at Wango Tango in early June, alongside the release of "The Light Is Coming" on June 20. She later confirmed that the song was not the album's second single; instead, "God Is a Woman" would be the second when it was released on July 20. On June 12, she posted a cover artwork of Sweetener piece by piece through the anonymous Instagram account of the same name, and revealed its full artwork on June 18. Grande surprised her fans a month later by announcing that the single would be released on July 13.

On August 8, three dates were announced for a series of promotional concerts in the United States, titled the Sweetener Sessions, in partnership with American Express. Prior to the album's release, Spencer Kornhaber of The Atlantic commented that the first three singles from the album "sparked with a sense of defiance and rattled mortality ... [a] trifecta of pseudo-spiritualism and sneaky innovation. [...] Grande's music and videos radiate [intoxicating, unworried confidence]". Grande also announced a world tour in support of the album and its successor Thank U, Next (2019). Titled the Sweetener World Tour, it began on March 18, 2019, and concluded on December 22. A concert film, titled Ariana Grande: Excuse Me, I Love You, is based on the tour and was released on Netflix on December 21, 2020.

=== Singles ===
"No Tears Left to Cry" was released on April 20, 2018 as the lead single from the album. The accompanying music video, directed by Meyers, followed on the same day. The track debuted at number three on the US Billboard Hot 100, becoming Grande's ninth Hot 100 top-ten and sixth to debut in the top-ten, tying Grande with Lady Gaga and Rihanna in sixth among acts with the most top 10 debuts on the chart. The single made Grande the first artist in the chart's 60-year history to debut in the top 10 with a lead single from each of her first four albums. The song also topped the Mainstream Top 40 chart in July 2018, reaching number one in nine countries. (Note: Number one chart positions for Australia, Estonia, Hungary, Iceland, Ireland, Israel, Malaysia, Norway, and Singapore) It was later certified sextuple Platinum by the Recording Industry Association of America (RIAA), for earning over six million units in the United States. "The Light Is Coming", featuring Nicki Minaj, was released on June 20, along with the pre-order of the album as the only promotional single. It was co-written and produced by Williams, while Meyers handled the music video's direction. The song peaked at number 89 on the US Billboard, following the release of the parent album.

The second single, "God Is a Woman", was released on July 13, with its music video premiering 12 hours after the song's release. Meyers directed the song's music video, featuring 45 separate set-ups within its four-minute runtime. The single debuted at number eleven on the Billboard Hot 100 and peaked at number eight, making it Grande's tenth top-ten song on the chart and placing her as the twelfth overall artist and seventh female artist with the most Hot 100 top-tens in the 2010s decade. The song also became Grande's second single to top the US Mainstream Top 40 airplay chart from Sweetener, and third overall. It was later certified quadruple Platinum by the RIAA, for earning over four million units in the United States. "Breathin" was released to US contemporary hit radio as the third and final single from the album on September 18. The song debuted at number 22 on the US Billboard Hot 100, later peaking at number 12. Its music video, directed by American film director Hannah Lux Davis, premiered on November 7.

== Critical reception ==
=== Reviews ===
Professional ratings
Aggregate scores
Source	Rating
AnyDecentMusic?	7.5/10
Metacritic	81/100
Review scores
Source	Rating
AllMusic	4.5/5 stars
The Daily Telegraph	4/5 stars
Entertainment Weekly	A−
The Guardian	3/5 stars
The Independent	3/5 stars
The Irish Times	5/5 stars
NME	4/5 stars
Pitchfork	8.1/10
Rolling Stone	4/5 stars
Vice (Expert Witness)	A−

Sweetener received critical acclaim from music critics. At Metacritic, which assigns a normalized rating out of 100 to reviews from mainstream critics, Sweetener has an average score of 81 based on 20 reviews, indicating "universal acclaim".

Reviewing for Vice, Robert Christgau called the album a "garden of sonic delights" and wrote: "Grande is pleasant in such a physically uncommon and technically astute way. Her pure, precise soprano is warm without burr or melisma, its mellow sweetness never saccharine or showy". In The New York Times, Jon Pareles said the singer's voice "can be silky, breathy or cutting, swooping through long melismas or jabbing out short R&B phrases; it's always supple and airborne, never forced. [...] Ms. Grande sails above any fray, past or present. Her aplomb is her triumph." Brittany Spanos of Rolling Stone called the album "a refreshing, cohesive package. [... The producers' approach lets] Grande's easy way with trap phrasing find a home next to her flair for Broadway-esque dramatic runs"; it combines "the sensual romance of the album's plentiful love songs and the aching heartbreak of the others." Spanos concludes that it is Grande's "best album yet, and one of 2018's strongest pop releases to date". Kate Solomon of The Independent commented that with music that is "often unexpected, sometimes in a good way, it is an album by an artist in flux – trying to move forward while reluctant to fully relinquish old ideas." Some critics dubbed Sweetener an important album in Grande's catalogue. (Note: Attributed to multiple sources)

Writing for NME, Douglas Greenwood deemed the album "[a] confident, accomplished, sometimes left-field collection of pop bangers, proving that she's not shy of experimentation." He also commented that "there are a couple of songs on Sweetener that you'd happily leave on the shelf." Similarly, in The Guardian, Alexis Petridis said that "her collaborations with Pharrell really push the boundaries. But they make the rest of this album seem formulaic." He considered the album "uneven", with its attempts to balance out what Grande called a "weird" record. Petridis felt that "the world could use more pop music as imaginative as Sweetener's highlights."

Neil McCormick in The Daily Telegraph felt that "the quality of the songs is high, although there are moments when they might be trying too hard to demonstrate that the teen queen is all grown up now," and argued, "as modern, branded, blockbuster pop albums go, Sweetener is a delightful confection." He commented less favorably about guest rappers Nicki Minaj and Missy Elliott, who "sound like they dialled in clichéd verses for a pay cheque."

=== Rankings ===
In December 2018, Billboard placed Sweetener at the top of their year-end list for the best albums of 2018, praising Grande's handling of personal struggles and describing her as more "approachable and human than ever". They later included both Sweetener and its follow-up Thank U, Next on its decade-end ranking of "The 100 Greatest Albums of the 2010s", placing them at numbers 38 and 8, respectively. Billboard described Sweetener as Grande's most personal work at the time and viewed the album as marking a new stage in her "pop superstardom". On their rankings of the Grammy's Best Pop Vocal Album winners, Yardbarker ranked Sweetener number 15 on their list. Sweetener landed a number two position on Paper's "Top 20 Albums of 2018".

Select year-end and decade-end rankings
Publication	Accolade	Rank	Ref.
Billboard	50 Best Albums of 2018	1	
Billboard	The 100 Greatest Albums of the 2010s	38	
Entertainment Weekly	The 20 Best Albums of 2018	3	
The Guardian	The 50 Best Albums of 2018	20	
The Line of Best Fit	The Best Albums of 2018	13	
NME	Albums of the Year 2018	21	
NPR	The 50 Best Albums of 2018	22	
Pitchfork	The 50 Best Albums of 2018	11	
Pitchfork	The 200 Best Albums of the 2010s	100	
Rolling Stone	The 50 Best Albums of 2018	5	
Rolling Stone	The 20 Best Pop Albums of 2018	2	
Slant	The 25 Best Albums of 2018	20	
Stereogum	The 50 Best Albums of 2018	3	
Stereogum	The 100 Best Albums of the 2010s	42	

== Legacy and accolades ==
Grande's embrace of trap music on Sweetener was praised for showcasing the contemporary influence of hip hop on pop music; Elias Leight of Rolling Stone argued that Sweetener reflected the growing dominance of trap music within mainstream pop, particularly through Grande's collaborations with Williams, Martin, and Salmanzadeh. He viewed the album as an example of how trap production had become widely "remarkable" into 2010s music. Billboard considered Grande to have avoided the commercial difficulties experienced by some of her contemporaries amid changing trends in "pop landscape".

Sweetener's message of love, positivity, and resilience has been noted by media outlets as one of its signature traits. (Note: Attributed to multiple sources) Evening Standard named Grande "the most important artist of 2018" due in part to the positivity she expressed in the album. Paper paralleled the album with Beyoncé's sixth studio album, Lemonade (2016), stating: "like Beyoncé who made Lemonade from her own life's lemons just two years ago, Sweetener's legacy will be its resoundingly positive message about true love's grace and its ability to help us cope with loss."

Sweetener received several accolades following its release. In 2018, the album won Music Drop of the Year at the Break the Internet Awards and received a nomination for Album of 2018 at the People's Choice Awards. The following year, it won Best Pop Vocal Album at the Grammy Awards and Pop Album of the Year at the iHeartRadio Music Awards.

List of awards and nominations
Year	Ceremony	Category	Result	Ref.
2018	Break the Internet Awards	Music Drop of the Year	Won	
2018	People's Choice Awards	Album of 2018	Nominated	
2019	Grammy Awards	Best Pop Vocal Album	Won	
2019	iHeartRadio Music Awards	Pop Album of the Year	Won	

== Commercial performance ==
=== United States ===
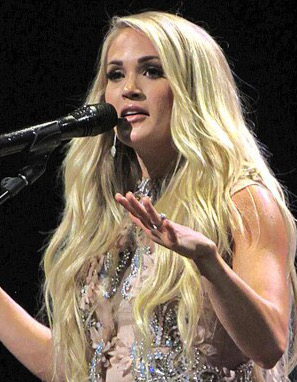
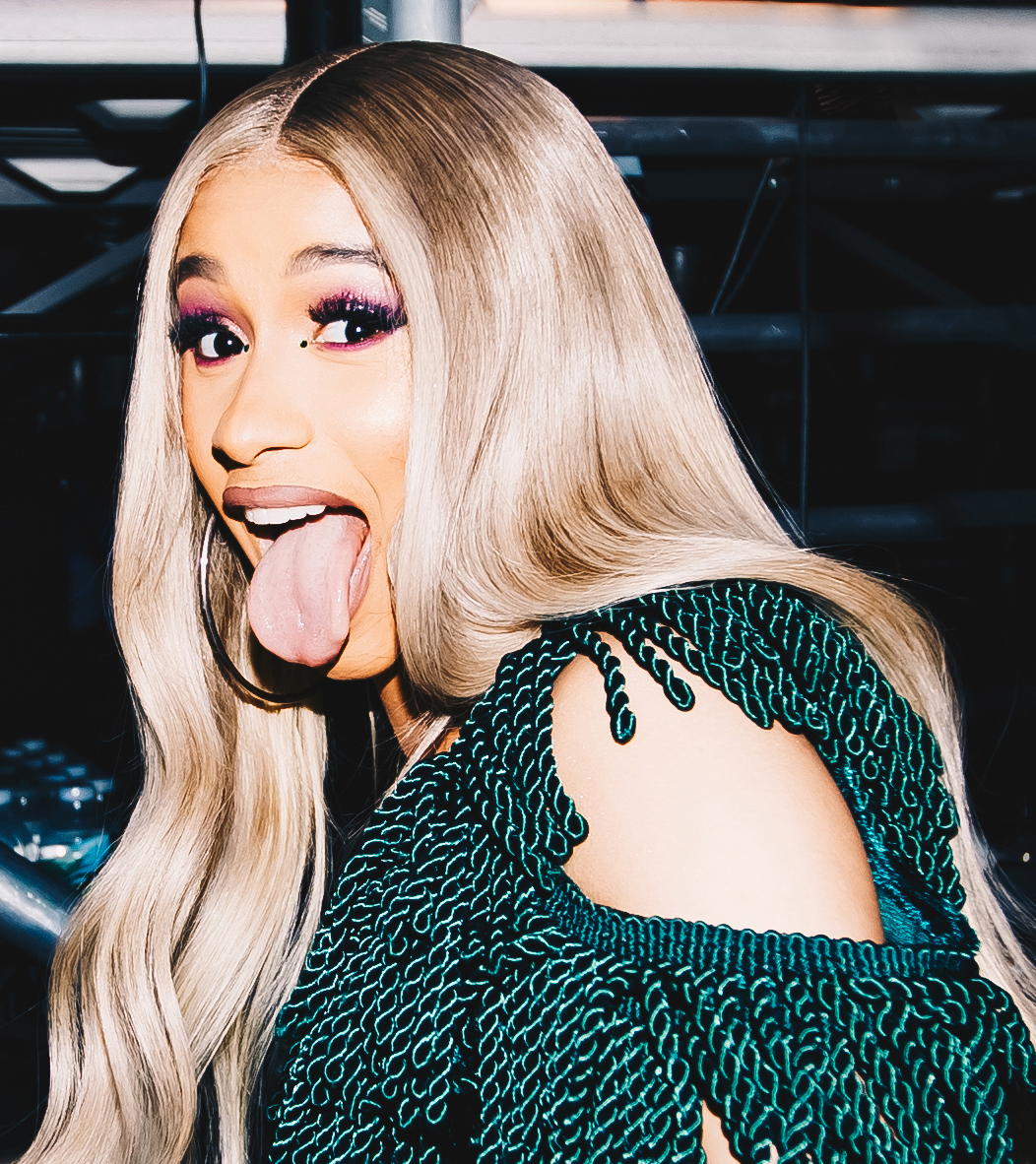
Sweetener was the third highest-selling album by a female artist in 2018, ranking behind American singers Carrie Underwood's Cry Pretty (left) and Cardi B's Invasion of Privacy (right).

In 2022, Billboard named Sweetener among 15 commercially successful albums that failed to generate a Billboard Hot 100 number-one single. Sweetener debuted at number-one on the US Billboard 200 with 231,000 album-equivalent units, of which 127,000 represented traditional album sales; it marked Grande's third number one album in the country. Among female artists, Sweetener scored the third-largest US sales debut of 2018, behind Carrie Underwood's Cry Pretty (266,000 album-equivalent units) and Cardi B's Invasion of Privacy (255,000 album-equivalent units). (Note: Although Billboard reported Sweetener as the second-largest debut week for an album by a female artist in 2018 behind Invasion of Privacy, Cry Pretty later surpassed it with 266,000 album-equivalent units, placing Sweetener third overall.) Sweetener's songs recorded 126.7 million on-demand audio US streams through its first week, constituting the largest streaming week ever for a non-hip hop album by a woman, a record later bested by Grande's Thank U, Next. It was also the fourth non-hip hop record ever to cross 125 million on-demand first-week streams. Billboard noted Sweetener's strong performance on streaming services was remarkable for a pop album at the time, since streaming was dominated by rap music.

On the US Billboard Hot 100, issue dated September 1, 2018, nine of Grande's songs from Sweetener charted simultaneously, placing Grande as the fourth female artist with the most simultaneous entries on the chart for a female soloist, behind Taylor Swift, Beyoncé, and Cardi B. The same week, Grande ascended to number one on the Artist 100 chart, due to strong album sales and song streams. In its second week, Sweetener descended to number four, moving 75,000 equivalent album units. In its third week, it fell one position to number five, with a furthered 56,000 units earned.

Sweetener was ranked 38th on the 2018 year-end Billboard 200 chart. The succeeding year, it was ranked as 32nd most popular album of the year. On August 17, 2023, the fifth anniversary of its release, Sweetener was certified double platinum by the RIAA for combined sales and album-equivalent units of over two million units in the US. As of June 2020, the album has sold 321,000 copies in the country.

=== Other territories ===
Sweetener topped the record charts of other 24 territories and reached the top 10 in six other markets. (Note: Number one chart positions for Argentina, Australia, Belgium, Canada, Croatia, Czech Republic, Estonia, the Netherlands, Finland, Greece, Ireland, Italia, Mexico, New Zealand, Norway, Poland, Portugal, Scotland, Slovakia, Spain, Sweden, Switzerland, Taiwan, and the UK) (Note: Top ten chart positions for Austria, Denmark, France, Germany, Hungary, and Japan) In the United Kingdom, Sweetener debuted at number one on the UK Albums Chart, moving 45,000 album-equivalent units. It became her second number-one album in the UK and her fastest selling album to date. Following its release, two album tracks entered the UK Singles Chart—as "Breathin" debuted at number eight, and "Sweetener" landed at number 22, while the single "God Is a Woman" ascended six places to number six. Sweetener was the best-performing album of 2018 by a foreign female artist, and has been certified platinum by the British Phonographic Industry (BPI), for shipments of over 300,000 units in the country.

In Australia, Sweetener became Grande's third number one on the ARIA Albums Chart. All 15 of the album's tracks placed on the ARIA Singles Chart simultaneously, becoming Grande's first album to do so. It ranked as the country's fourth-best-selling album by a female soloist in 2018. Additionally, two Sweetener singles, "No Tears Left to Cry" and "God Is a Woman", landed in ARIA's annual top singles chart for the same year.

== Track listing ==
Sweetener track listing
No.	Title	Writer(s)	Producer(s)	Length
1.	"Raindrops (An Angel Cried)"	Bob Gaudio	Ilya; Max Martin	0:37
2.	"Blazed" (featuring Pharrell Williams)	Ariana Grande; Pharrell Williams; Maxine Ashley	Williams	3:16
3.	"The Light Is Coming" (featuring Nicki Minaj)	Grande; Onika Maraj; Williams	Williams	3:48
4.	"R.E.M."	Grande; Williams	Williams	4:05
5.	"God Is a Woman"	Grande; Savan Kotecha; Ilya Salmanzadeh; Max Martin; Rickard Göransson	Ilya	3:17
6.	"Sweetener"	Grande; Williams	Williams	3:28
7.	"Successful"	Grande; Williams	Williams	3:47
8.	"Everytime"	Grande; Kotecha; Salmanzadeh; Martin	Ilya; Martin	2:52
9.	"Breathin"	Grande; Kotecha; Salmanzadeh; Peter Svensson	Ilya	3:18
10.	"No Tears Left to Cry"	Grande; Kotecha; Salmanzadeh; Martin	Ilya; Martin	3:25
11.	"Borderline" (featuring Missy Elliott)	Grande; Melissa Elliott; Williams	Williams	2:57
12.	"Better Off"	Grande; Kim Krysiuk; Tommy Brown; Chauncey Hollis; Brian Malik Baptiste	Brown; Hit-Boy; Baptiste	2:51
13.	"Goodnight n Go"	Grande; Victoria Monét; Imogen Heap; Brown; Charles Anderson; Michael Foster	Brown; Anderson; Foster	3:09
14.	"Pete Davidson"	Grande; Brown; Anderson; Monét	Brown; Anderson	1:13
15.	"Get Well Soon"	Grande; Williams	Williams	5:22
Total length:				47:25

=== Notes ===
- All track titles are stylized in lowercase, except for "R.E.M", which is stylized in all caps and "God Is a Woman", in sentence case.
- Japanese edition includes the instrumental version of "No Tears Left to Cry" and "God Is a Woman", and the Japanese deluxe edition includes a DVD which features the music videos of "No Tears Left to Cry" and "The Light Is Coming".

=== Sample credits ===
- "Raindrops (An Angel Cried)" is an a cappella cover of "An Angel Cried", a 1964 song written by Bob Gaudio and performed by The Four Seasons.
- "Goodnight n Go" contains a sample of and incorporates lyrics from "Goodnight and Go" (2006), written and performed by Imogen Heap.

== Credits and personnel ==
Credits were adapted from the liner notes.

=== Recording locations ===
- MXM Studios; LA, Los Angeles, CA, US (tracks 1, 8–9)
- Charlice Recording Studios; Hollywood, CA (2, 3, 6, 7, 11, 15)
- Conway Recording Studios; Hollywood, CA (2–4, 6, 11)
- Glenwood Place Studios; Burbank, CA (3, 6)
- Jungle City Studios; New York, NY (3)
- The Lunchtable; Los Angeles, CA (3, 6)
- Midnight Blue Studios; Miami, FL (4)
- EastWest Studios; Hollywood, CA (6)
- South Beach Studios; Miami Beach, FL (7)
- Wolf Cousins Studios; Stockholm, SE (8–9)
- MXM Studios; Stockholm, SE (10)
- District 4–12 Studios; Northridge, CA, US (12)

=== Performers and musicians ===
- Ariana Grande – vocals
- Pharrell Williams – featured artist (2), additional vocals (4, 6)
- Nicki Minaj – featured artist (3)
- Missy Elliott – featured artist (11)
- Rickard Göransson – guitar (5)
- Peter Lee Johnson – strings (12, 14)
- Max Martin – bass (8, 10), drums (8, 10), keyboards (8–10), percussion (10)
- Ilya Salmanzadeh – background vocals (5, 9), drums (5, 8–10), guitar (5, 9), keyboards (5, 8–10), bass (8–9), percussion (10)

=== Production ===
- Charles Anderson – production (13–14)
- Brian Malik Baptiste – production (12)
- Cory Bice – recording engineer assistance (1, 8–10)
- Scooter Braun – executive production
- Tommy Brown – production (12–14)
- Andrew Coleman – recording (2, 4, 6–7, 11), digital editing (2, 4, 6–7, 11), arrangement (2, 4, 6–7, 11)
- Kris Crawford – recording assistance (3)
- Thomas Cullison – recording assistance (2, 6–7, 11, 15)
- Aubrey "Big Juice" Delaine – vocals recording (3)
- Jacob Dennis – recording engineer assistance (3, 6)
- Scott Desmarais – mix assistance (3)
- Corte Ellis – recording (11)
- Missy Elliott – recording (11)
- Iain Findlay – recording assistance (6)
- Robin Florent – mix assistance (3)
- Michael Foster – production (13)
- Chris Galland – mix assistance (3)
- Şerban Ghenea – mixing (5, 8–14)
- Ariana Grande – executive production, vocal production
- Hart Gunther – recording assistance (7)
- John Hanes – mix assistance (5, 8–14)
- Hit-Boy – production (12)
- Sam Holland – recording (1, 8–10)
- Chris Khan – recording assistance (6)
- David Kim – recording assistance (6)
- Mike Larson – recording (2–4, 6–7, 11, 15), digital editing (2–4, 6–7, 11, 15), arrangement (2–4, 6–7, 11, 15), additional programming (3–4)
- Guillermo Lefeld – recording assistance (4)
- Jeremy Lertola – recording engineer assistance (1, 8–10)
- Manny Marroquin – mixing (3)
- Max Martin – production (1, 8, 10), programming (8, 10)
- Randy Merrill – mastering
- Brendan Morawski – recording engineer assistance (3)
- Manny Park – recording assistance (3)
- Noah Passovoy – recording (9)
- Ramon Rivas – recording engineer assistance (3)
- Ilya Salmanzadeh – production (1, 5, 8–10), mixing (1), programming (5, 8–10)
- Ben "Bengineer" Sedano – recording assistance (2–3, 6, 11)
- Jon Sher – recording assistance (4)
- Phil Tan – mixing (2, 4, 6–7, 11, 15)
- Pharrell Williams – production (2–4, 6–7, 11, 15)
- Bill Zimmerman – additional engineering (2, 4, 6–7, 11, 15)

=== Artwork ===
- Dave Meyers – photography
- Jessica Severn – art direction, design

== Charts ==
=== Weekly charts ===
Chart (2018–2025)	Peak position
Argentine Albums (CAPIF)	1
Australian Albums (ARIA)	1
Austrian Albums (Ö3 Austria)	4
Belgian Albums (Ultratop Flanders)	1
Belgian Albums (Ultratop Wallonia)	1
Canadian Albums (Billboard)	1
Croatian International Albums (HDU)	1
Czech Albums (ČNS IFPI)	1
Danish Albums (Hitlisten)	2
Estonian Albums (Eesti Tipp-40)	1
Dutch Albums (Album Top 100)	1
Finnish Albums (Suomen virallinen lista)	1
French Albums (SNEP)	2
German Albums (Offizielle Top 100)	3
Greek Albums (IFPI)	1
Hungarian Albums (MAHASZ)	6
Irish Albums (IRMA)	1
Italian Albums (FIMI)	1
Japan Hot Albums (Billboard Japan)	4
Japanese Albums (Oricon)	5
Mexican Albums (AMPROFON)	1
New Zealand Albums (RMNZ)	1
Norwegian Albums (VG-lista)	1
Polish Albums (ZPAV)	1
Portuguese Albums (AFP)	1
Scottish Albums (Official Charts)	1
Slovak Albums (ČNS IFPI)	1
South Korean Albums (Circle)	24
South Korean International Albums (Circle)	2
Spanish Albums (Promusicae)	1
Swedish Albums (Sverigetopplistan)	1
Swiss Albums (Schweizer Hitparade)	1
Taiwanese Albums (Five Music)	1
UK Albums (Official Charts)	1
US Billboard 200	1

=== Monthly charts ===
Chart (2018)	Position
Czech Albums (ČNS IFPI)	44
Slovak Albums (ČNS IFPI)	4
South Korean Albums (Gaon)	56

=== Year-end charts ===
Chart (2018)	Position
Australian Albums (ARIA)	16
Belgian Albums (Ultratop Flanders)	33
Belgian Albums (Ultratop Wallonia)	90
Canadian Albums (Billboard)	35
Danish Albums (Hitlisten)	48
Dutch Albums (Album Top 100)	20
Dutch CombiAlbum Chart (MegaCharts)	21
French Albums (SNEP)	101
Icelandic Albums (Tónlistinn)	45
Irish Albums (IRMA)	13
Italian Albums (FIMI)	64
Mexican Albums (AMPROFON)	19
New Zealand Albums (RMNZ)	27
South Korean International Albums (Gaon)	34
Spanish Albums (PROMUSICAE)	50
Swedish Albums (Sverigetopplistan)	48
Swiss Albums (Schweizer Hitparade)	88
UK Albums (OCC)	16
US Billboard 200	38

Chart (2019)	Position
Australian Albums (ARIA)	43
Belgian Albums (Ultratop Flanders)	56
Belgian Albums (Ultratop Wallonia)	170
Canadian Albums (Billboard)	34
Danish Albums (Hitlisten)	66
French Albums (SNEP)	167
Icelandic Albums (Tónlistinn)	60
Irish Albums (IRMA)	28
Latvian Albums (LAIPA)	67
Mexican Albums (AMPROFON)	62
Swedish Albums (Sverigetopplistan)	97
UK Albums (OCC)	50
US Billboard 200	32

Chart (2020)	Position
Belgian Albums (Ultratop Flanders)	190

Chart (2021)	Position
Polish Albums (ZPAV)	37

Chart (2022)	Position
Polish Albums (ZPAV)	95

=== Decade-end charts ===
Chart (2010–2019)	Position
US Billboard 200	137

== Certifications ==
Certifications and sales
Region	Certification	Certified units/sales
Australia (ARIA)	Platinum	70,000^{‡}
Austria (IFPI Austria)	Gold	7,500^{‡}
Brazil (Pro-Música Brasil)	Gold	20,000^{‡}
Canada (Music Canada)	3× Platinum	240,000^{‡}
Denmark (IFPI Danmark)	Platinum	20,000^{‡}
Finland (Musiikkituottajat)	2× Platinum	40,000
France (SNEP)	Platinum	100,000^{‡}
Italy (FIMI)	Platinum	50,000^{‡}
Mexico (AMPROFON)	Gold	30,000^{‡}
New Zealand (RMNZ)	3× Platinum	45,000^{‡}
Norway (IFPI Norway)	Platinum	20,000^{‡}
Poland (ZPAV)	3× Platinum	60,000^{‡}
Portugal (AFP)	Gold	3,500^{‡}
Singapore (RIAS)	Platinum	10,000^{*}
Spain (Promusicae)	Gold	20,000^{‡}
Sweden (GLF)	Gold	15,000^{‡}
Switzerland (IFPI Switzerland)	Platinum	20,000^{‡}
United Kingdom (BPI)	Platinum	300,000^{‡}
United States (RIAA)	2× Platinum	2,000,000^{‡}
^{*} Sales figures based on certification alone.^{‡} Sales+streaming figures based on certification alone.

== Release history ==
Release dates and formats
Region	Date	Format	Label	Ref.
Various	August 17, 2018	CD; digital download; streaming	Republic	
United Kingdom	August 21, 2018	Cassette	Island	
Various	October 15, 2018	Cassette	Republic	
Various	November 2018	LP	Republic	

== See also ==
- List of Billboard 200 number-one albums of 2018
- List of number-one albums of 2018 (Australia)
- List of number-one albums of 2018 (Canada)
- List of number-one albums of 2018 (Ireland)
- List of number-one albums of 2018 (Mexico)
- List of number-one albums from the 2010s (New Zealand)
- List of number-one albums in Norway
- List of number-one albums of 2018 (Scotland)
- List of number-one hits of 2018 (Switzerland)
- List of UK Albums Chart number ones of the 2010s
- List of UK Album Downloads Chart number ones of the 2010s
