= List of Billboard Mainstream Top 40 number-one songs of 2018 =

This is a list of songs which reached number one on the Billboard Mainstream Top 40 (or Pop Songs) chart in 2018.

During 2018, a total of 19 singles hit number-one on the charts.

== Chart history ==
Key
†	Indicates best-performing single of 2018

Issue date	Song	Artist(s)	Ref.
January 3	"Havana"	Camila Cabello featuring Young Thug	
January 6	"Havana"	Camila Cabello featuring Young Thug	
January 13	"Havana"	Camila Cabello featuring Young Thug	
January 20	"Perfect"	Ed Sheeran	
January 27	"Perfect"	Ed Sheeran	
February 3	"New Rules" †	Dua Lipa	
February 10	"New Rules" †	Dua Lipa	
February 17	"New Rules" †	Dua Lipa	
February 24	"New Rules" †	Dua Lipa	
March 3	"Perfect"	Ed Sheeran	
March 10	"Let You Down"	NF	
March 17	"Him & I"	G-Eazy and Halsey	
March 24	"Him & I"	G-Eazy and Halsey	
March 31	"Finesse"	Bruno Mars featuring Cardi B	
April 7	"The Middle"	Zedd, Maren Morris and Grey	
April 14	"The Middle"	Zedd, Maren Morris and Grey	
April 21	"The Middle"	Zedd, Maren Morris and Grey	
April 28	"The Middle"	Zedd, Maren Morris and Grey	
May 5	"The Middle"	Zedd, Maren Morris and Grey	
May 12	"Never Be the Same"	Camila Cabello	
May 19	"Never Be the Same"	Camila Cabello	
May 26	"Never Be the Same"	Camila Cabello	
June 2	"The Middle"	Zedd, Maren Morris and Grey	
June 9	"The Middle"	Zedd, Maren Morris and Grey	
June 16	"Psycho"	Post Malone featuring Ty Dolla Sign	
June 23	"Psycho"	Post Malone featuring Ty Dolla Sign	
June 30	"Psycho"	Post Malone featuring Ty Dolla Sign	
July 7	"Psycho"	Post Malone featuring Ty Dolla Sign	
July 14	"Mine"	Bazzi	
July 21	"No Tears Left to Cry"	Ariana Grande	
July 28	"Delicate"	Taylor Swift	
August 4	"Girls Like You"	Maroon 5 featuring Cardi B	
August 11	"Girls Like You"	Maroon 5 featuring Cardi B	
August 18	"Girls Like You"	Maroon 5 featuring Cardi B	
August 25	"Girls Like You"	Maroon 5 featuring Cardi B	
September 1	"Girls Like You"	Maroon 5 featuring Cardi B	
September 8	"Better Now"	Post Malone	
September 15	"Better Now"	Post Malone	
September 22	"Love Lies"	Khalid and Normani	
September 29	"Love Lies"	Khalid and Normani	
October 6	"Youngblood"	5 Seconds of Summer	
October 13	"Youngblood"	5 Seconds of Summer	
October 20	"Youngblood"	5 Seconds of Summer	
October 27	"Youngblood"	5 Seconds of Summer	
November 3	"Youngblood"	5 Seconds of Summer	
November 10	"God Is a Woman"	Ariana Grande	
November 17	"Happier"	Marshmello and Bastille	
November 24	"Happier"	Marshmello and Bastille	
December 1	"Happier"	Marshmello and Bastille	
December 8	"Happier"	Marshmello and Bastille	
December 15	"High Hopes"	Panic! at the Disco	
December 22	"High Hopes"	Panic! at the Disco	
December 29	"High Hopes"	Panic! at the Disco	

== See also ==
- 2018 in American music
