= Breathin =

Single by Ariana Grande

from the album Sweetener
- Released: September 18, 2018
- Recorded: February 2, 2018
- Studio: MXM (Los Angeles); Wolf Cousins (Stockholm)
- Genre: Dance-pop; electro-R&B
- Length: 3:18
- Label: Republic
- Songwriters: Ariana Grande; Savan Kotecha; Ilya Salmanzadeh; Peter Svensson
- Producer: Ilya Salmanzadeh

Ariana Grande singles chronology
"God Is a Woman" (2018)	"Breathin" (2018)	"Thank U, Next" (2018)

Music video
- "Breathin" on YouTube

"Breathin" is a song by American singer-songwriter Ariana Grande. It was released on September 18, 2018, by Republic Records as the third and final single from her fourth studio album Sweetener (2018), and was sent to contemporary hit radio stations in the United States the same day. Produced by Ilya Salmanzadeh, "Breathin" is a dance-pop and electro-R&B song that features synthesizers and an upbeat production incorporating disco and EDM elements. The song is based on Grande's experiences with post-traumatic stress disorder as a result of the Manchester Arena bombing, and the lyrics describe how Grande uses breathing exercises to recover from panic attacks.

Music critics called the song a highlight of Sweetener and praised it for its motivational approach to discussing anxiety. Commercially, the single reached number one in Iceland and Israel and the top forty in twenty-seven additional countries. Two music videos for the song premiered in 2018. The first features Grande's pet shoat walking on a bed, intended as a comedic prelude to the "real" music video. Directed by Hannah Lux Davis, the video in question depicts Grande in a train station as commuters rush past her, representing how people often feel disconnected from their surroundings during panic attacks.

== Background ==
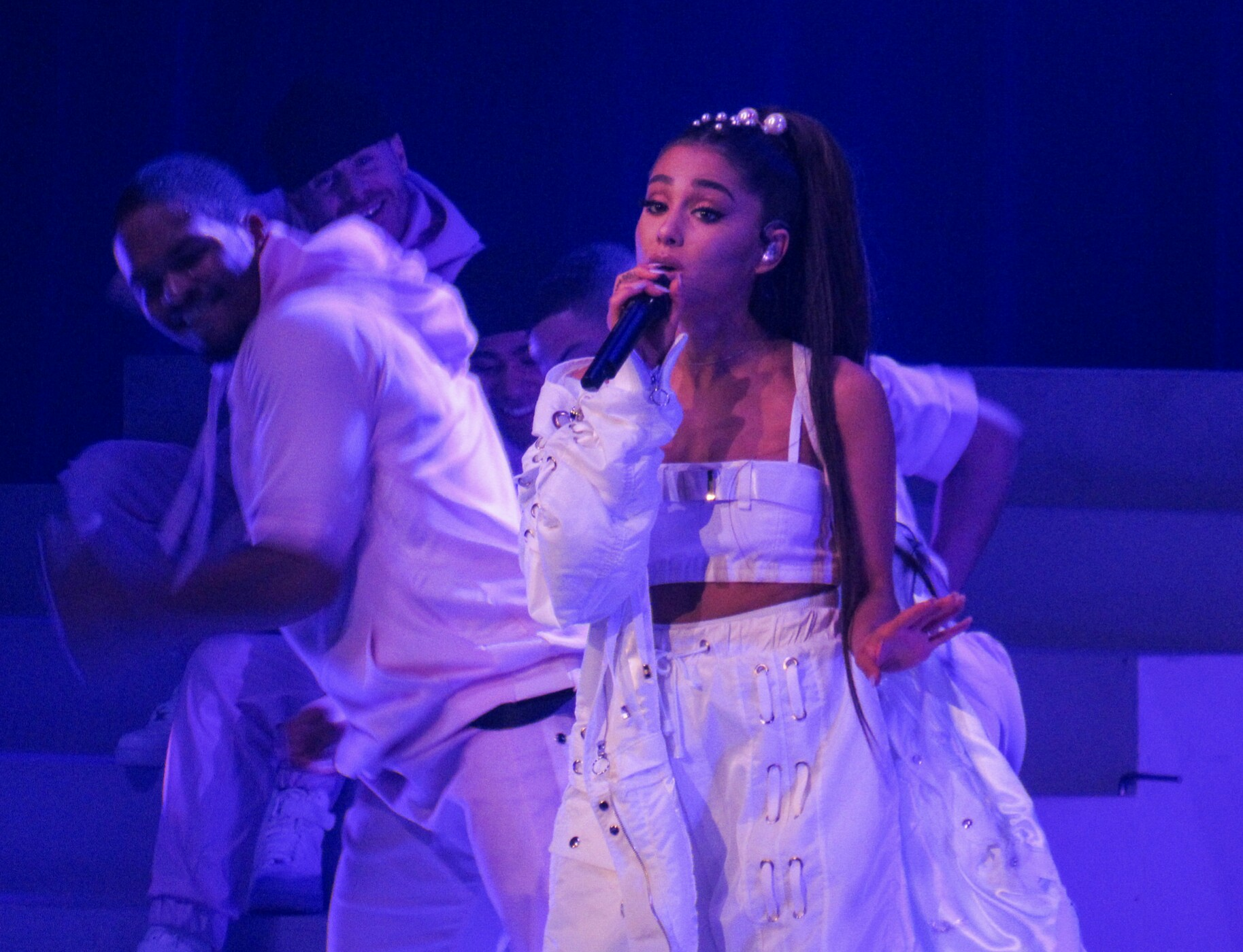
Ariana Grande developed post-traumatic stress disorder after a terrorist attack that killed 22 people occurred during the Manchester concert of her Dangerous Woman Tour.

Ariana Grande released her third studio album Dangerous Woman in 2016 to critical acclaim. It debuted at number two on the US Billboard 200 and was the 28th best-selling album of the year, with 900,000 copies sold worldwide. To support the album, Grande embarked on the Dangerous Woman Tour, which ran in 2017 and had four dates scheduled in the United Kingdom. During a concert in the Manchester Arena on May 22, a homemade bomb was detonated in a suicide terrorist attack, killing 22 concert-goers. After the bombing, Grande went through two highly publicized break-ups: one with rapper Mac Miller who died of an accidental overdose months later, and another with comedian Pete Davidson.

The Manchester Arena attack left Grande in a state of emotional turmoil, causing her to suffer from frequent symptoms of post-traumatic stress disorder. Her anxiety began manifesting through physical symptoms; Grande recalled being dizzy and unable to breathe properly once she returned home from tour. Due to her trauma, she took a hiatus from music, or what NME called a "moment of professional and personal stasis". Breaking up with Miller exacerbated her mental health problems. After his death, she frequently spoke in interviews about memories of their relationship.

Sweetener, released in 2018, marked Grande's first album since the Manchester Arena attack. Work on the album had begun back in 2016, but Grande temporarily halted recording because she wanted to cope with the bombing's aftermath first: "it would be nice to really hold my loved ones close for a little while, stay home for a little bit." She revealed the tracklist for Sweetener in July 2018; the album contains "Breathin" as its seventh track. She teased the song's title during the music video for "No Tears Left to Cry", Sweetener's lead single released a month prior. During her appearance on The Tonight Show Starring Jimmy Fallon, Grande described "Breathin" as follows:

'Breathin' is about breathing when you're anxious. It's about anxiety and feeling like you can't get a full breath. It's the worst feeling in the world [...] I was having lots of [anxiety attacks]. There was no end. We were in the studio, we were writing and I was like, 'I can't breathe.' They were like, 'We're gonna write this song.' I was like, 'Okay, still can't breathe, but we'll write it.'

== Recording and composition ==
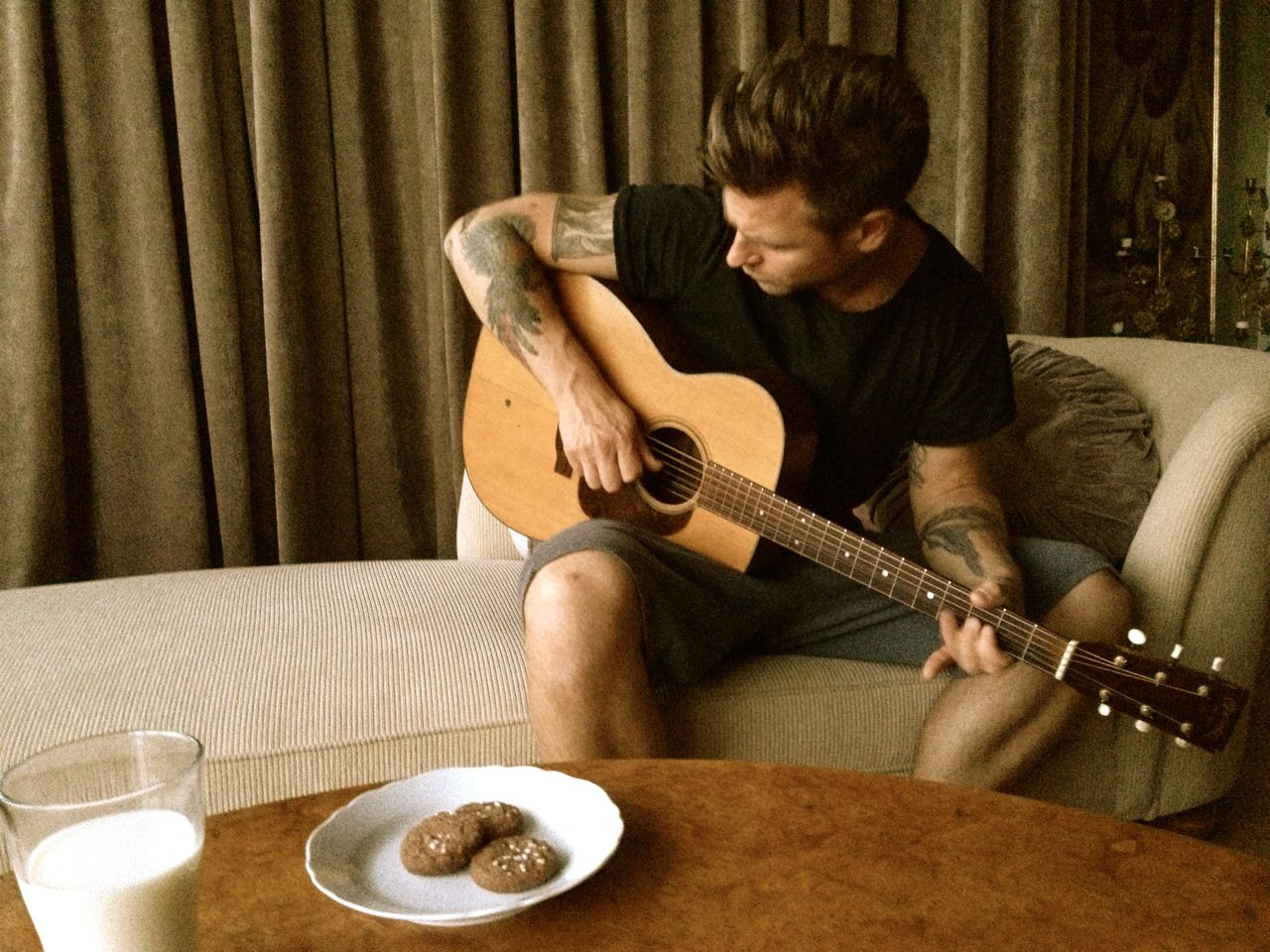
Peter Svensson (pictured) contributed to songwriting.

Grande wrote "Breathin" with Savan Kotecha, Peter Svensson, and its producer Ilya Salmanzadeh. Her vocals were recorded by Sam Holland and Noah Passovoy at MXM Studios in Los Angeles, California, and Wolf Cousins Studios in Stockholm, Sweden. Cory Bice and Jeremy Lertola provided recording engineer assistance. Serban Ghenea, assisted by John Hanes, mixed the song at MixStar Studios in Virginia Beach, Virginia. Randy Merrill then mastered the song at Sterling Sound in New York City, New York.

"Breathin" is a dance-pop and electro-R&B song backed by synthesizers and keytars. It is 3 minutes and 18 seconds long. The song features an upbeat rhythm, incorporating disco and EDM elements into its production. It depicts Grande in the middle of a panic attack, and it features shifts in dynamics or volume to evoke the feeling of anxiety. The song opens with a voice recording played backwards—when reversed, it reads "Tonight's your special night, do something magical."

The lyrics center around Grande's experiences with anxiety after going through the Manchester Arena attack. She describes the feeling in various ways: "Feel my blood runnin', swear the sky's falling / How do I know if this shit's fabricated?" As seen in one verse, Grande looks up to find "the whole room spinning" due to feeling drained of energy. In the hook, which she performs with airy vocals, she sings "just keep breathin' and breathin' and breathin' and breathin'", repeatedly reminding herself to stay grounded in reality. Some music journalists drew connections between the lyrical themes and how Grande's mental well-being had been impacted by her break-up with Miller and his subsequent death.

== Critical reception ==
Jillian Mapes from Pitchfork said that Grande turned "the melancholy of Drake into a meditation on anxiety with 'Breathin'". Many music critics called "Breathin" a highlight of Sweetener. They praised the song for its upbeat arrangement, as well as its approach to discussing anxiety, commending the personal lyrics and its advice to practice self-care. Rolling Stone's Ilana Kaplan highlighted the lushness of its production and the relatability of its depictions of panic, and she cited it as "one of Ariana's finest moments as an artist". Crystal Bell wrote for Teen Vogue: "'Breathin' embodies so much of what makes the Sweetener era so impressive: It channels pain into perseverance. A pop star can't save you, but she can give you the soundtrack to save yourself." In 2021, The Guardian ranked the song number 10 on their list of the 20 greatest Ariana Grande songs, and in 2022, Rolling Stone ranked the song number 11 on their list of the 50 greatest Ariana Grande songs.

== Commercial performance ==
Upon the release of Sweetener, "Breathin" became a fan favorite and saw a relatively high increase in streams. It entered several charts worldwide due to strong digital sales. In the United States, the song debuted at number 22 on the Billboard Hot 100 issue dated September 1, 2018, earning Grande her fourteenth top-forty entry and marked the highest debut of nine entries from the album of which debuted on the Hot 100 the same week. The track sold 27,800 digital downloads in its opening week, allowing it to also enter the Digital Songs chart at number four. The following week, "Breathin" dropped fifteen positions to number 37 on the Hot 100. As radio airplay began to build, the track officially debuted at number 38 on the Mainstream Top 40. Consequently, Grande became the first female soloist to place three entires in the top forty of the Pop Songs chart that week since Lady Gaga did so in 2010. The song fluctuated on the Hot 100 for several weeks, and climbed from number 41 to 32 in its tenth week, jumping to number 21 the week after, overcoming its debut position of number 22. It reached a peak of number 12, and spent 25 weeks on the chart.

"Breathin" entered the Billboard Mainstream Top 40 at number 38 for the chart issue dated September 18, 2018, and moved up to number 34 the following week. The song has since climbed up to number two, earning Grande her ninth top-five single there and third from Sweetener. On the Billboard Dance Club Songs, "Breathin" debuted at number 43 on the issue dated October 27, 2018, rising to number 27 in its second frame. The song reached the top spot in its seventh week on the chart, marking her third consecutive chart-topper and fourth overall.

Internationally, "Breathin" reached number one in Iceland and Israel. The song debuted at number eight as the highest entry of the week on both the Australian ARIA Charts and the UK Singles Chart, becoming her eighth top-ten single in both countries. The song has also reached the top-ten in the Czech Republic, Ireland, Hungary, Lebanon, Portugal and Slovakia, as well as reached the top-twenty in Austria, Canada, Denmark, Finland, New Zealand, Norway, Scotland, Sweden, and Switzerland.

On March 17, software company Calm announced that Grande would be included in the "Sleep Remix Series" for their meditation app, alongside other artists, such as Shawn Mendes and Kacey Musgraves. The following Friday, they released an hour-long remix of "Breathin" to Calm subscribers, which they described as "ethereal".

== Live performances ==
Grande debuted the song live at The Sweetener Sessions. Grande also performed the song along with her single "Thank U, Next" on The Ellen DeGeneres Show on November 7, 2018. Grande performed the song as part of her set at the 2019 Coachella Valley Music and Arts Festival, Lollapalooza and Manchester Pride, as well as part of the regular setlist on her Sweetener World Tour.

== Music videos ==
Two music videos for the song were released. Grande released the first music video of the song on October 10, 2018, starring her pet piglet, Piggy Smallz, curiously approaching the camera and walking around on a bed with a plush cover. Grande shot the footage. Grande posted on Instagram that she hoped the video would make fans laugh while they await the "real" music video. Critics found the first video funny and endearing, calling Piggy Smallz cute. Grande later revealed more news on the status of the official music video on November 3, 2018, via her Twitter account, stating that it would be released alongside the lead single of her fifth studio album. The music video was eventually released on November 7, 2018, on her YouTube account.

Director Hannah Lux Davis shot this scene using motion control photography, filming Grande at a slower frame rate than the crowds walking past her. The scene symbolizes how people often feel disconnected from their surroundings during panic attacks.

Hannah Lux Davis, who had worked on several of Grande's music videos in the past, directed the second music video for "Breathin". (Note: Davis had directed the music videos for "Bang Bang" (2014), "Love Me Harder" (2014), "Focus" (2015), "Into You" (2016), and "Side to Side" (2016).) Filming took place within two weeks and had a turnaround time of one day, much to Davis's astonishment since most of the scenes involved some form of special effects. The video opens with alternating shots of Grande in a dimly lit bar and in a bright room filled with fog. Clouds, a motif present in her past visual works, appear in several scenes, often obscuring Grande's vision. At some points, she appears with a cloud for a head. One scene near the end of the video depicts her riding a swing in the sky. Daniel Welsh of The Huffington Post thought this represented Grande's triumph over her anxiety.

Multiple shots in the video depict Grande in a busy train station as commuters rush around her in a time lapse effect that makes them look blurry. It symbolizes how people often feel disconnected from their surroundings during panic attacks. Davis achieved this effect through motion control photography, filming Grande at a slower frame rate than the people walking past her. In one scene, Grande sits atop a pile of luggage, interpreted by Kathryn Lindsay of Refinery29 as a metaphor for her mental health struggles, which include trauma from the Manchester Arena bombing, Miller's death, and her break-up with Davidson. In another, the camera focuses on a departure sign that includes the words "needy", "remember" and "imagine", which many viewers thought was an Easter egg teasing the tracklist for Grande's next studio album, Thank U, Next (2019). (Note: Grande revealed the full tracklist for Thank U, Next in 2019, confirming "Needy" and "Imagine" as one of its songs.)

== Credits and personnel ==
Credits and personnel adapted from the liner notes of Sweetener.

Recording and management

- Recorded at MXM Studios (Los Angeles, California) and Wolf Cousins Studios (Stockholm, Sweden)
- Mixed at MixStar Studios (Virginia Beach, Virginia)
- Mastered at Sterling Sound (New York City, New York)

Personnel

- Ariana Grande – vocals, vocal production
- Ilya – songwriting, production, backing vocals, keyboards, bass, drums, guitar, programming
- Max Martin – keyboards
- Sam Holland – recording
- Noah Passovoy – recording
- Cory Bice – recording engineer assistance
- Jeremy Lertola – recording engineer assistance
- Serban Ghenea – mixing
- John Hanes – mixing assistance
- Randy Merrill – mastering

== Charts ==
=== Weekly charts ===
Weekly chart performance for "Breathin"
Chart (2018–2019)	Peak position
Argentina (Argentina Hot 100)	100
Australia (ARIA)	8
Austria (Ö3 Austria Top 40)	19
Belgium (Ultratop 50 Flanders)	20
Belgium (Ultratip Bubbling Under Wallonia)	9
Canada Hot 100 (Billboard)	15
Canada AC (Billboard)	20
Canada CHR/Top 40 (Billboard)	4
Canada Hot AC (Billboard)	7
Croatia (HRT)	15
Czech Republic Singles Digital (ČNS IFPI)	9
Denmark (Tracklisten)	19
Finland (Suomen virallinen lista)	14
France (SNEP)	70
Germany (GfK)	35
Greece Digital Songs (Billboard)	1
Hungary (Single Top 40)	6
Hungary (Stream Top 40)	4
Iceland (Tónlistinn)	1
Ireland (IRMA)	5
Italy (FIMI)	33
Israel (Media Forest)	1
Japan Hot Overseas (Billboard)	11
Lebanon (Lebanese Top 20)	6
Netherlands (Dutch Top 40)	16
Netherlands (Mega Top 50)	22
Netherlands (Single Top 100)	23
New Zealand (Recorded Music NZ)	11
Norway (VG-lista)	18
Portugal (AFP)	6
Scottish Singles Sales (Official Charts)	17
Singapore (RIAS)	28
Slovakia Singles Digital (ČNS IFPI)	7
South Korea International (Gaon Digital Chart)	49
Spain (Promusicae)	45
Sweden (Sverigetopplistan)	13
Switzerland (Schweizer Hitparade)	14
UK Singles (Official Charts)	8
US Billboard Hot 100	12
US Adult Contemporary (Billboard)	21
US Adult Pop Airplay (Billboard)	7
US Dance Club Songs (Billboard)	1
US Dance Airplay (Billboard)	8
US Pop Airplay (Billboard)	2
US Rhythmic Airplay (Billboard)	33

=== Year-end charts ===
2018 year-end chart performance for "Breathin"
Chart (2018)	Position
Netherlands (Dutch Top 40)	88
Netherlands (Mega Top 50)	94
Portugal (AFP)	153

2019 year-end chart performance for "Breathin"
Chart (2019)	Position
Canada (Canadian Hot 100)	78
Israel (Galgalatz)	18
US Billboard Hot 100	72
US Adult Contemporary (Billboard)	46
US Adult Top 40 (Billboard)	30
US Dance Club Songs (Billboard)	50
US Mainstream Top 40 (Billboard)	25

== Certifications ==
Certifications for "Breathin"
Region	Certification	Certified units/sales
Australia (ARIA)	3× Platinum	210,000^{‡}
Austria (IFPI Austria)	Gold	15,000^{‡}
Brazil (Pro-Música Brasil)	Diamond	160,000^{‡}
Canada (Music Canada)	3× Platinum	240,000^{‡}
Denmark (IFPI Danmark)	Gold	45,000^{‡}
France (SNEP)	Gold	100,000^{‡}
New Zealand (RMNZ)	2× Platinum	60,000^{‡}
Norway (IFPI Norway)	Gold	30,000^{‡}
Poland (ZPAV)	Platinum	50,000^{‡}
Portugal (AFP)	Platinum	10,000^{‡}
Spain (Promusicae)	Gold	30,000^{‡}
United Kingdom (BPI)	Platinum	600,000^{‡}
United States (RIAA)	3× Platinum	3,000,000^{‡}
Streaming
Sweden (GLF)	Platinum	8,000,000^{†}
^{‡} Sales+streaming figures based on certification alone.^{†} Streaming-only figures based on certification alone.

== Release history ==
Release history and formats for "Breathin"
Country	Date	Format	Label	Ref.
United States	September 18, 2018	Contemporary hit radio	Republic	
Italy	September 21, 2018	Contemporary hit radio	Universal	
United States	September 24, 2018	Adult contemporary radio; hot adult contemporary radio; modern adult contemporary radio	Republic	

== See also ==
- List of number-one dance singles of 2018 (U.S.)
