= Pete Davidson (song) =

2018 song by Ariana Grande

Song by Ariana Grande

from the album Sweetener
- Released: August 17, 2018
- Recorded: May 2018
- Length: 1:13
- Label: Republic
- Songwriters: Ariana Grande; Tommy Brown; Charles Anderson; Victoria Monét
- Producers: Tommy Brown; Charles Anderson

Audio sample
- file; help

"Pete Davidson" (stylized in lowercase) is a song by American singer-songwriter Ariana Grande. The song serves as the fourteenth track from her fourth studio album, Sweetener (2018). It was released through Republic Records on August 17, 2018, alongside the album. The song was written by Grande, Victoria Monét and its producers Tommy Brown and Charles Anderson. The song was titled after Grande's then-fiance.

== Background ==
This is about Pete Davidson. I was like, why not? You know? Be direct.

— Grande about renaming the track

"Pete Davidson" was the last song recorded for Sweetener.

The song was written when Grande and her now ex-fiancé, Pete Davidson, began dating. It was first teased on May 31, 2018, after Grande posted her first picture with Davidson on Instagram with the description: "i thought u into my life 💭 woah ! look at my mind 💡⚡️🙈" which were lyrics later included in the then-upcoming song. On June 7, 2018, Grande confirmed that recently she recorded an interlude for Sweetener. On June 17, 2018, she posted a snippet of the interlude, then on the same day, confirmed the title "Pete". The song was later renamed to "Pete Davidson".

== Critical reception ==
The song received generally positive reviews. Neil McCormick in The Daily Telegraph wrote that the song is "utterly gorgeous, a sweet nothing dissolving into blissful oohs." The Irish Times' Louise Bruton said the song "adds a lightness to the record." Brittany Spanos from Rolling Stone said that "Pete Davidson" is "a song that gets the point across with its title alone, she's found her serenity."

== Charts ==
Chart performance for "Pete Davidson"
Chart (2018)	Peak position
Australia (ARIA)	58
Canada Hot 100 (Billboard)	73
Portugal (AFP)	87
UK Audio Streaming (Official Charts)	55
US Billboard Hot 100	99

== Certifications ==
Certifications for "Pete Davidson"
Region	Certification	Certified units/sales
Australia (ARIA)	Gold	35,000^{‡}
Brazil (Pro-Música Brasil)	Gold	20,000^{‡}
^{‡} Sales+streaming figures based on certification alone.

== Cover versions ==
Electronic music producer Jonathan Hay released a dance cover of "Pete Davidson" with a heavy jazz influence titled "Pete Davidson (Reimagined as House Music)" in December 2021.
