= Get Well Soon (song) =

2018 song by Ariana Grande

Song by Ariana Grande

from the album Sweetener
- Released: August 17, 2018
- Recorded: December 2017
- Studio: Chalice Recording Studios (Hollywood, California)
- Genre: Soul; gospel
- Length: 5:22
- Label: Republic
- Songwriters: Ariana Grande; Pharrell Williams
- Producer: Pharrell Williams

Audio
- "Get Well Soon" on YouTube

"Get Well Soon" is a song by American singer Ariana Grande, who co-wrote the song with its producer Pharrell Williams. The closing track of Grande's fourth studio album, Sweetener (2018), it is inspired by Grande's personal anxiety and post-traumatic stress disorder (PTSD) following the May 2017 terrorist attack after her concert in Manchester, United Kingdom.

== Background ==
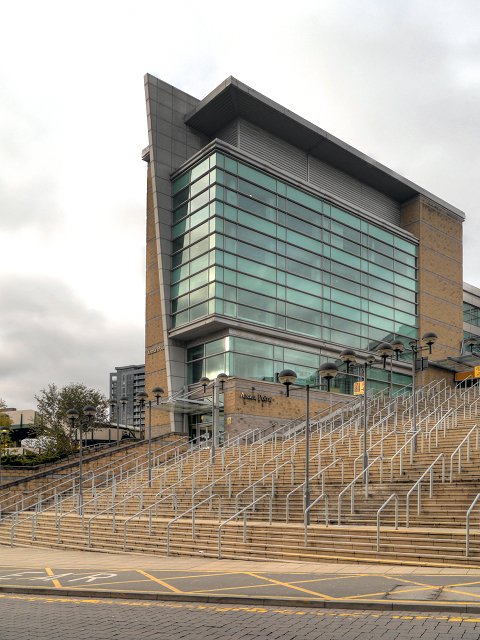
Grande performed at the Manchester Arena on the same date of the terrorist suicide bombing in Manchester. After the attacks, she suffered PTSD and anxiety, which led her to create "Get Well Soon."

Grande released her third studio album, Dangerous Woman on May 20, 2016. A commercial and critical success, Grande embarked on the Dangerous Woman Tour in 2017 to further promote it. She performed at the Manchester Arena in Manchester, United Kingdom on May 22, 2017, chosen as one of the dates in the European leg of the tour. When the concert ended, concert-goers left through City Room, one of the entrances into the arena. A terrorist attack by suicide bombing went off in the City Room one minute after. The bombing was responsible for the casualties of 22 victims and injuries of 1,017 people.

As a result of the attack, Grande suffered from post-traumatic stress disorder (PTSD) in an interview with British Vogue. She revealed that she had "really wild dizzy spells, this feeling like I couldn't breathe", and that she "felt so upside down" and her anxiety became physical. Grande shared her experience with Pharrell Williams, with whom she created the song. In a later interview for Paper, Grande said: "[Pharrell] kind of forced it out of me, because I was in a really bad place mentally. ... [Pharrell] was like, 'You have to write about it. You need to make this into music and get this shit out, and I promise it will heal you.' And it definitely helped." She also said that the song is "probably one of the most important songs [she would] ever write." Grande revealed in an interview on Beats 1 Radio that she intended the song to offer a "musical hug". She further explained that "Get Well Soon" is about "being there for each other and helping each other through scary times and anxiety" and about "personal demons and anxiety and more intimate tragedies as well", stressing that mental health is very important.

== Recording and composition ==
"Get Well Soon" was written by Grande and its producer Pharrell Williams. The recording of the song took place at the Chalice Recording Studios in Hollywood, California. It is a soul and gospel ballad that runs for five minutes and twenty-two seconds. The singer's vocals are stacked (layered); Grande intended them to represent "all the voices in [her] head talking to one another". In Grande's Time magazine Next Generation Leaders interview, her vocals are described as being "interwoven in dense layers of sound, creating an otherworldly effect".

At the end of the track, 40 seconds of silence are played, making the song five minutes and twenty-two seconds long. Some listeners speculate the song's length is a reference to the date of the Manchester Arena bombing: May 22, 2017 (5/22).

== Critical reception ==
Pitchfork editor Jillian Mapes called "Get Well Soon" a "career-defining moment" and praised it as "the sort of freeform, self-help soul ballad you'd maybe expect to round out a Beyoncé opus" and wrote: "Anyone who knows how gracefully Grande handled the horrific events at her Manchester show last year will recognize an equally graceful response to her own emotional aftermath in this song." The Independent's Kate Solomon described the track as ambitious and said: "As a five-minute musical interpretation of the post-traumatic panic attacks Grande has suffered, 'Get Well Soon' is not exactly enjoyable to listen to but admirable in its honesty." Chris Willman described Grande's singing as florid and Neil McCormick wrote that she sounded like "a one-woman doo-wop combo". Paper's "Top 100 Songs of 2018" ranked the song at #15, commending Grande for "[doing] something she didn't have to" by "[transforming] her pain into something digestible, like sweetener molecules settling into a bitter cup of coffee."

== Live performances ==
Grande performed the song for the first time while on her promotional tour The Sweetener Sessions. She also performed it in the special Ariana Grande at the BBC. During the Sweetener World Tour, she originally omitted it from the setlist because according to her, the song was not designed to be performed in a big concert and instead just for small venues like The Sweetener Sessions. However, starting with the show in Phoenix on May 14, 2019, "Goodnight n Go" was replaced with a shortened version of "Get Well Soon".

== Credits and personnel ==
Credits and personnel adapted from the liner notes of Sweetener.

Recording and management

- Recorded at Chalice Recording Studios (Hollywood, California) for I Am Other Entertainment
- Mixed at Callanwolde Fine Arts Center (Atlanta, Georgia)
- Mastered at Sterling Sound (New York City)
- Published by EMI Pop Music Publishing/More Water from Nazareth (GMR), Universal Music Group Corp. (ASCAP)/GrandAriMusic (ASCAP)

Personnel

- Ariana Grande – songwriting, vocals, vocal production
- Pharrell Williams – songwriting, vocals, record producer
- Phil Tan – mixing
- Bill Zimmermann – additional mix engineering
- Randy Merrill – mastering
- Mike Larson – recording, digital editing and arrangement for I Am Other Entertainment
- Thomas Cullison – recording assistantance

== Charts ==
Chart performance for "Get Well Soon"
Chart (2018)	Peak position
Australia (ARIA)	79
UK Audio Streaming (Official Charts)	81
US Bubbling Under Hot 100 (Billboard)	16

== Certifications ==
Region	Certification	Certified units/sales
Brazil (Pro-Música Brasil)	Gold	20,000^{‡}
^{‡} Sales+streaming figures based on certification alone.
