= God Is a Woman =

2018 single by Ariana Grande

Single by Ariana Grande

from the album Sweetener
- Released: July 13, 2018
- Genre: Pop; hip-hop
- Length: 3:17
- Label: Republic
- Songwriters: Ariana Grande; Ilya Salmanzadeh; Max Martin; Savan Kotecha; Rickard Göransson
- Producer: Ilya

Ariana Grande singles chronology
"Bed" (2018)	"God Is a Woman" (2018)	"Breathin" (2018)

Music video
- "God Is a Woman" on YouTube

"God Is a Woman" is a song by American singer Ariana Grande. It was released on July 13, 2018, by Republic Records as the second single from her fourth studio album Sweetener (2018). The song was written by Grande, Max Martin, Savan Kotecha, Rickard Göransson and its producer Ilya.

"God Is a Woman" was positively received by music critics. The song debuted at number 11 and later reached a peak of number eight, becoming Grande's tenth top-10 single on the US Billboard Hot 100. It became her fourth single to top the US Mainstream Top 40 airplay chart. The song also attained a top-10 peak within the charts of 17 countries, including number one in Greece, Iceland and Israel, number four in the United Kingdom, Ireland, Singapore and Malaysia, number five in Australia, Canada, Hungary and New Zealand, as well as reaching the top-20 in Austria, Denmark, Norway, the Netherlands, and Switzerland. The single is certified Platinum in six countries in addition to Triple Diamond in Brazil. The song was nominated for Best Pop Solo Performance at the 61st Annual Grammy Awards.

== Background and release ==
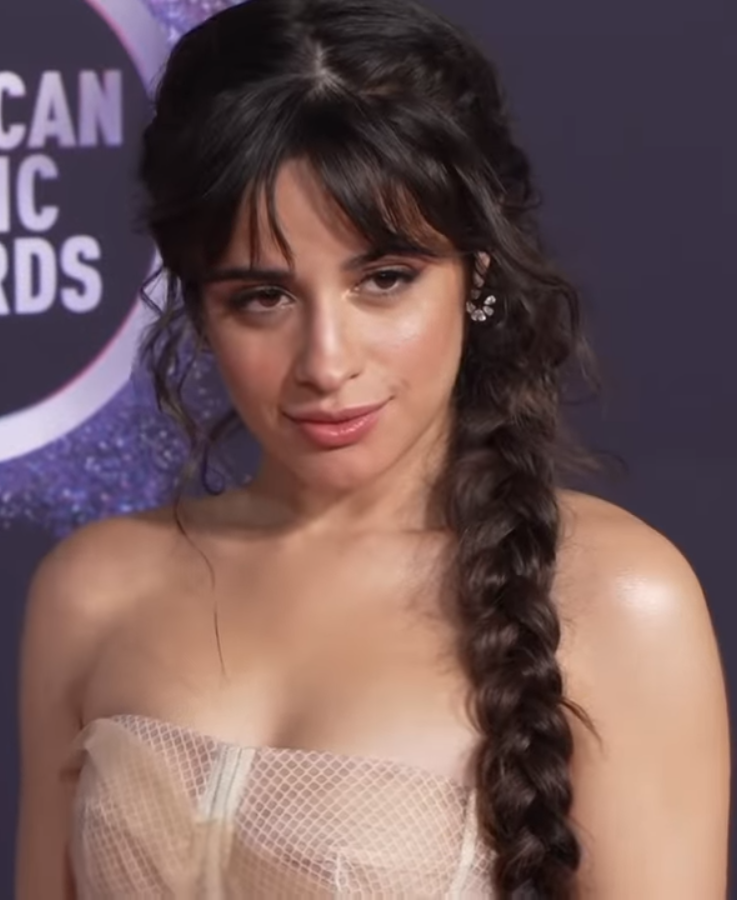
"God Is a Woman" was initially recorded by Camila Cabello (pictured in 2019).

"God Is a Woman" was first teased in a scene in the music video for lead single "No Tears Left to Cry", which displayed what appears to be a working track listing for the upcoming album. Grande confirmed the title on The Tonight Show Starring Jimmy Fallon on May 1, 2018. On June 27, Grande revealed that the song would become the official second single from her album. She initially announced on Twitter that the song would be released on July 20, however, she later confirmed the release date as July 13. During an interview with SiriusXM's Radio Andy, Camila Cabello commented that "God Is a Woman" was initially written for her, but eventually stating that "it didn't end up sounding right for me." The original version by Cabello, featuring Rita Ora, eventually leaked online in 2023. Grande’s version differs from the leaked version, containing new verses and a revised chorus.

== Composition and lyrics ==
"God Is a Woman" is a midtempo song that runs for three minutes and 17 seconds. It was characterized as a pop-hip hop hybrid track that blends "trip hoppy-R&B" and soft rock with influences of reggae over "hypnotic" trap-pop production. Time described the song as "an anthemic, sultry banger", and noted that "Grande's voice is layered so that it sounds like a choir, but really, it's only her, multiplied." The song contains assertive lyrics embracing her femininity and intertwining themes of sexuality and spirituality.

The song is performed in the key of E♭ minor with a tempo of 145 beats per minute in common time. The song follows a chord progression of E♭m – D♭/E♭ – E♭m – D♭/E♭ – C♭maj7 – D♭/C♭ –A♭m7 – B♭m7, and Grande's vocals span from E♭_{3} to E♭_{6}.

== Critical reception ==
Bryan Rolli of Forbes called it "an impressive show of both virtuosity and restraint" and "one of the best pop songs of the summer—if not the year". He also praised Grande's vocal performance "sprinkling her signature falsetto across the sultry chorus and reining in her vocal acrobatics in the verses. She tries on different flows at her whim, singing slow, seductive come-ons ("I can tell that you know I know how I want it") and riffing on Migos' triplet flow in the pre-choruses. The track is full of chilly, hypnotic trap beats, tasteful drops and electronic squawks, atop which Grande harmonizes with herself to suck listeners into the world she's created for three-and-a-half minutes. [Grande] performs with a maturity that her last two singles lacked, taking a fairly simple formula—heroic female pop vocals plus entrancing trap beats—and turning it into a bite-sized masterpiece. The track probably won't put to bed any controversial theological debates, but it sure made a lot of people believe in something tonight."

== Accolades ==
Accolades for "God Is a Woman"
Year	Organization	Award	Result	Ref.
2019	Grammy Awards	Best Pop Solo Performance	Nominated	
2019	MTV Video Music Awards	Best Visual Effects	Nominated	

== Commercial performance ==
Upon release, "God Is a Woman" began receiving early radio support in the United States. The song drew in 172 spins from 52 Mediabase-monitored pop stations across the country on the final tracking period days. On the issue dated July 28, 2018, "God Is a Woman" debuted at number 11 on the Billboard Hot 100 chart, selling 43,000 digital downloads during its opening week, allowing it to enter the Digital Songs chart at number four while starting on the Streaming Songs chart at number 11 with 25.1 million US streams. In its second week, the song fell 10 positions to number 21 on the Hot 100. The song also entered Billboard's Mainstream Top 40 at number 27, moving up to number 23 the following week. It later reached number one on the chart, becoming Grande's eleventh top-10 single and fourth to reach the summit of the chart. In March 2019, "God Is a Woman" was certified double platinum by the Recording Industry Association of America for shipments exceeding two million units in the United States.

Following the release of Sweetener and its performance at the 2018 MTV Video Music Awards on August 20, 2018, "God Is a Woman" jumped 22 positions on the Hot 100 from number 30 to number 8, becoming Grande's tenth top-ten single there and placing her as the twelfth overall artist and seventh female artist with the most Hot 100 top 10s in the 2010s decade. The song subsequently rose to number 8 on Streaming Songs and climbed to number 39 on Billboard Radio Songs that week. It has since reached number six there, earning Grande her ninth top-10 on the Radio Songs chart and giving her the most top 10s among women since her first, "Problem" in June 2014, surpassing Taylor Swift who has amassed eight since that date. On the Billboard Dance Club Songs, "God Is a Woman" debuted at number 42 on the issue dated August 25, 2018, climbing to number 31 the following week. The song later topped the chart, becoming her second consecutive number one and third overall; consequently, Sweetener became her first album to spawn multiple top 10s on that chart. Similarly, the track also peaked at number six on the US Dance/Mix Show Airplay chart. In Canada, the song debuted at number five on the Canadian Hot 100.

In the United Kingdom, "God Is a Woman" entered the Official Trending Chart at number one following its release, with the song set to debut in the top 10 of the chart regardless of any added points. On July 20, 2018, the song opened at number four on the UK Singles Chart, where it became her seventh top-ten single in the country. It also debuted on the UK R&B chart at number two, becoming her highest-charting entry there. Similarly, it entered the Irish Singles Chart at number four, and at number eight on the Scottish Singles Chart. In Australia, the song debuted at its peak of number five on the ARIA Charts, marking her seventh top-10 entry there as well.

== Music video ==
=== Lyric video ===
The lyric video for "God Is a Woman" premiered on Grande's YouTube channel alongside the release of the single. The video visualizes a cloud-filled background that transitions to a cosmic scene, ending with a still shot of the singer.

=== Official music video ===
The official music video was released later the same day. It was directed by Dave Meyers and features a monologue by Madonna. The video pays homage to The Creation of Adam, Romulus and Remus, astronomy, female genitalia, and other visual imagery similar to that of "No Tears Left to Cry", also directed by Meyers, as well as Greek mythology. Alexa Meade painted Grande for the music video.

=== Synopsis ===
Grande in the music video, floating in a vulva-resembling pool of paint. This scene was painted by Alexa Meade and inspired by Georgia O'Keeffe's 1923 painting Grey Lines with Blue, Black, and Yellow.

The music video begins with Grande at the center of a galaxy while she is standing on top of Earth. The next scene shows Grande painted and floating in a pool filled with a mixture of paint that intentionally resembles a human vulva, followed by her lying on a stage on top of a bed surrounded by men in briefs covered by foam in another scene with vaginal imagery. After this, Grande is shown sitting on top of a large book while a group of men throw physical "insults" at her. Then, after several scenes of her dancing in a blurry motion, she appears in a large crowd of women, with only her face towards the camera, and immediately after, then appears wearing a corset similar to Madonna's conical one from her Blond Ambition World Tour while a three-headed dog barks behind her.

The next scene then displays Grande dancing inside the flame of a candle, followed by her sitting on top of the Earth "fingering" a hurricane. The music then stops for the next scene, where a group of rodents come out of their mounds in an arid landscape, prior to one of them screaming, whom according to Grande, represent "the frustration of being a woman and feeling misunderstood." Grande then walks away from a crowd, and is seen to subsequently have a pregnant body. After re-enacting the Capitoline Wolf, several scenes repeat in the midst of her being seen in a floating triangle.

In the next scene, the music stops again and Grande lip-syncs to a voiceover appearance by Madonna, who recites a version of Ezekiel 25:17 (as in the 1994 film Pulp Fiction) while Grande stands inside a replica of the Roman Pantheon, before using a hammer to break the glass ceiling of the building, exposing the legs of a large woman and a light engulfing the area between the two. Several of the final scenes include Grande holding balloons in the shape of various planets while walking a tightrope, her standing in the middle of a worshiping crowd, and her appearing on top of a lighthouse's deck. In the final scene, she imitates The Creation of Adam.

=== Critical reception ===
The music video for "God Is a Woman" was generally well received by critics. Slate's Christina Cauterucci found the video's visuals to be "clever" and "nuanced," while Jasmine Ting of Cosmopolitan found it to be "the most symbolically rich, and significant, set of visuals [Grande had] put out." The Atlantic's Spencer Kornhaber additionally opined that the video had "a comedy to [its] conceptual overload and shabby-chic CGI effects, but what exactly the punchline is isn’t clear," whilst Sal Cinquemani of Slant Magazine added it to the magazine's 'The 20 Best Music Videos of 2018' list, while referring to it as "digital eye candy."

As of May 2024, the video has been viewed over 400 million times on YouTube. The music video was nominated for Best Visual Effects at the 2019 MTV Video Music Awards.

== Live performances ==
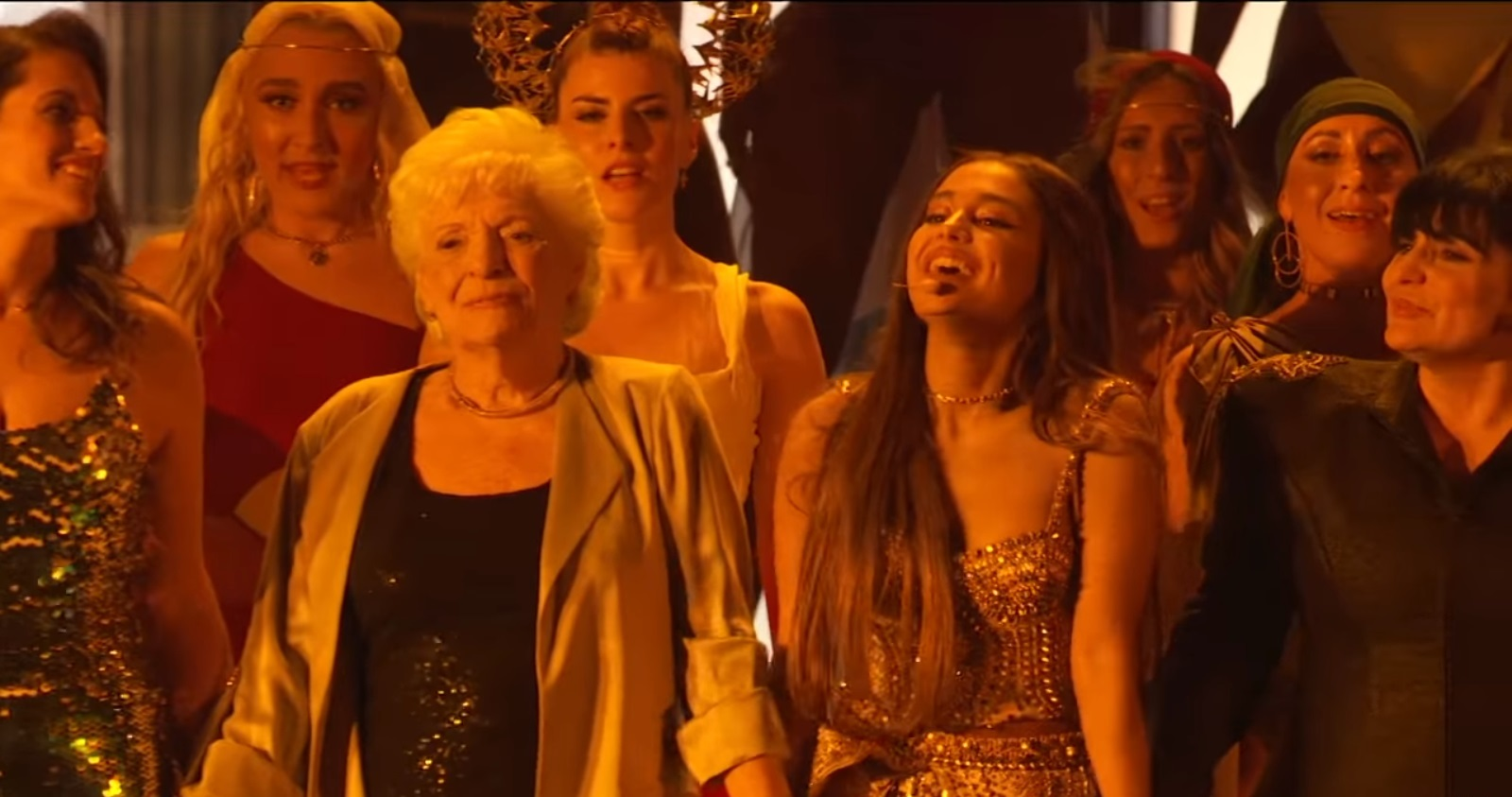
Grande performing "God Is a Woman" at the 2018 MTV Video Music Awards. Also seen next to her on either side are her grandmother Marjorie, her cousin Lani and her mother Joan.

Grande performed "God Is a Woman" for the first time on August 20, 2018, at the 2018 MTV Video Music Awards at Radio City Music Hall in New York City. The performance was themed around the Last Supper and Grande was accompanied onstage with over 50 female dancers. Grande was joined by her mother Joan, grandmother Marjorie and cousin Lani towards the end of the performance and after Grande finished singing, the four of them bowed together before exiting the stage. She also performed an acoustic version of the song the same week on Good Morning America.

"God Is a Woman" was included on the set list for The Sweetener Sessions, a promotional tour in support of her Sweetener album. The song is also included as the set opener of her Sweetener World Tour (2019) with a performance similar to her VMAs performance.

== Credits and personnel ==
Credits adapted from Tidal.

- Ariana Grande – vocals, background vocals, songwriting
- Ilya Salmanzadeh – production, songwriting, programming, keyboards, bass, drums, guitar, background vocals
- Max Martin – songwriting
- Rickard Goransson – guitar, songwriting
- Savan Kotecha – songwriting
- John Hanes – mix engineering
- Sam Holland – engineering
- Jeremy Lertola – assistant recording engineer
- Cory Bice – assistant recording engineer
- Serban Ghenea – mixing

== Charts ==
=== Weekly charts ===
Weekly chart performance
Chart (2018)	Peak position
Argentina (Argentina Hot 100)	63
Australia (ARIA)	5
Austria (Ö3 Austria Top 40)	11
Belgium (Ultratop 50 Flanders)	47
Belgium (Ultratip Bubbling Under Wallonia)	4
Bolivia (Monitor Latino)	13
Canada Hot 100 (Billboard)	5
Canada CHR/Top 40 (Billboard)	4
Canada Hot AC (Billboard)	25
Croatia (HRT)	44
Czech Republic Singles Digital (ČNS IFPI)	8
Denmark (Tracklisten)	17
Finland (Suomen virallinen lista)	8
France (SNEP)	38
Germany (GfK)	20
Greece Digital Songs (Billboard)	1
Hungary (Single Top 40)	5
Hungary (Stream Top 40)	3
Iceland (Tónlistinn)	1
Ireland (IRMA)	4
Italy (FIMI)	27
Israel (Media Forest)	1
Japan Hot 100 (Billboard)	73
Lebanon (OLT20)	14
Malaysia (RIM)	4
Mexico (Billboard Mexican Airplay)	33
Netherlands (Dutch Top 40)	26
Netherlands (Mega Top 50)	22
Netherlands (Single Top 100)	19
New Zealand (Recorded Music NZ)	5
Norway (VG-lista)	13
Portugal (AFP)	2
Romania (Airplay 100)	92
Scottish Singles Sales (Official Charts)	8
Singapore (RIAS)	4
Slovakia Airplay (ČNS IFPI)	66
Spain (PROMUSICAE)	35
Sweden (Sverigetopplistan)	12
Switzerland (Schweizer Hitparade)	9
UK Singles (Official Charts)	4
UK Hip Hop/R&B (Official Charts)	2
US Billboard Hot 100	8
US Adult Pop Airplay (Billboard)	36
US Dance Club Songs (Billboard)	1
US Dance Airplay (Billboard)	6
US Pop Airplay (Billboard)	1
US Rhythmic Airplay (Billboard)	27

=== Monthly charts ===
Monthly chart performance
Chart (2018)	Peak position
Brazil Streaming (Pro-Música)	37

=== Year-end charts ===
2018 year-end chart performance for "God Is a Woman"
Chart (2018)	Position
Australia (ARIA)	91
Canada (Canadian Hot 100)	66
Hungary (Single Top 40)	84
Hungary (Stream Top 40)	56
Portugal (AFP)	83
UK Singles (Official Charts Company)	76
US Billboard Hot 100	62
US Dance Club Songs (Billboard)	40
US Mainstream Top 40 (Billboard)	27

== Certifications ==
Certifications
Region	Certification	Certified units/sales
Australia (ARIA)	4× Platinum	280,000^{‡}
Austria (IFPI Austria)	Platinum	30,000^{‡}
Brazil (Pro-Música Brasil)	3× Diamond	480,000^{‡}
Canada (Music Canada)	5× Platinum	400,000^{‡}
Denmark (IFPI Danmark)	Platinum	90,000^{‡}
France (SNEP)	Platinum	200,000^{‡}
Germany (BVMI)	Gold	200,000^{‡}
Italy (FIMI)	Gold	25,000^{‡}
Mexico (AMPROFON)	Platinum	60,000^{‡}
New Zealand (RMNZ)	3× Platinum	90,000^{‡}
Norway (IFPI Norway)	Platinum	60,000^{‡}
Poland (ZPAV)	2× Platinum	100,000^{‡}
Portugal (AFP)	Platinum	10,000^{‡}
Spain (Promusicae)	Platinum	60,000^{‡}
United Kingdom (BPI)	2× Platinum	1,200,000^{‡}
United States (RIAA)	4× Platinum	4,000,000^{‡}
Streaming
Sweden (GLF)	Gold	4,000,000^{†}
^{‡} Sales+streaming figures based on certification alone.^{†} Streaming-only figures based on certification alone.

== Release history ==
"God Is a Woman" release history
Region	Date	Format(s)	Label(s)	Ref.
Various	July 13, 2018	Digital download; streaming	Republic	
Australia	July 13, 2018	Radio airplay	Republic; Universal Australia	
Italy	July 13, 2018	Radio airplay	Universal	
United States	July 24, 2018	Contemporary hit radio	Republic	
United States	August 7, 2018 (Note: "God Is a Woman" was originally set to be released to rhythmic contemporary radio on July 24, 2018, along with contemporary hit radio, but it was rescheduled to August 7.)	Rhythmic contemporary radio	Republic	

== Cover versions ==
- On October 2, 2018, English singer and songwriter Tom Grennan covered "God Is a Woman" for BBC Radio 1's Live Lounge segment.
- On October 4, 2018, Norwegian singer and songwriter AURORA covered "God Is a Woman" for NRK P3 Radio.
- On March 25, 2022, New Zealand pop singer Benee covered "God Is a Woman" for Australian youth broadcaster Triple J's segment Like a Version, in addition to a performance of her song "Never Ending".

== See also ==
- List of Billboard Hot 100 top-ten singles in 2018
- List of Billboard Mainstream Top 40 number-one songs of 2018
- List of Billboard Dance Club Songs number ones of 2018
