= The Light Is Coming =

2018 promotional single by Ariana Grande featuring Nicki Minaj

Promotional single by Ariana Grande featuring Nicki Minaj

from the album Sweetener
- Released: June 20, 2018
- Studio: Glenwood Place (Burbank); Jungle City (New York City); Germano (New York City); Chalice (Hollywood); Conway (Hollywood); The Lunchtable (Los Angeles)
- Genre: New wave; dance
- Length: 3:48
- Label: Republic
- Songwriters: Pharrell Williams; Onika Maraj; Ariana Grande
- Producer: Pharrell Williams

Ariana Grande promotional singles chronology
"Arturo Sandoval" (2018)	"The Light Is Coming" (2018)	"Imagine" (2018)

Music video
- "The Light Is Coming" on YouTube

"The Light Is Coming" is a song by the American singer Ariana Grande featuring Trinidadian rapper Nicki Minaj, released on June 20, 2018, as a promotional single of Grande's fourth studio album Sweetener. Minaj wrote her own intro while Grande co-wrote the majority of the song with its producer Pharrell Williams. The track debuted at number 95 and peaked at number 89 on the US Billboard Hot 100.

== Release ==
On May 27, 2018, Ariana Grande teased "The Light Is Coming" with a 21-second clip on her Instagram page. On June 2, she debuted a preview of the song at Wango Tango, announcing that the song would be released on June 20, 2018, along with the pre-order of Sweetener.

== Composition and lyrics ==
The song runs for three minutes and forty-eight seconds. It is a new wave and dance track with influences of R&B and hip hop. The sound is backed by Grande's vocals, singing, "The light is coming to give back everything the darkness stole". The song contains a "jittery beat" that is used with quick drums and synths. The song samples a 2009 CNN archive clip of a man named Craig A. Miller (deceased) who is shouting at then-senator Arlen Specter at a town hall meeting in Lebanon, Pennsylvania concerning healthcare ("You wouldn't let anybody speak for this and instead!"). Pharrell Williams has prominently used the sample in other songs he has produced, including N.E.R.D, Rihanna's "Lemon", and Usher's "Twisted".

Grande's vocals span one octave, from G♯_{3} to G♯_{4}.

== Critical reception ==
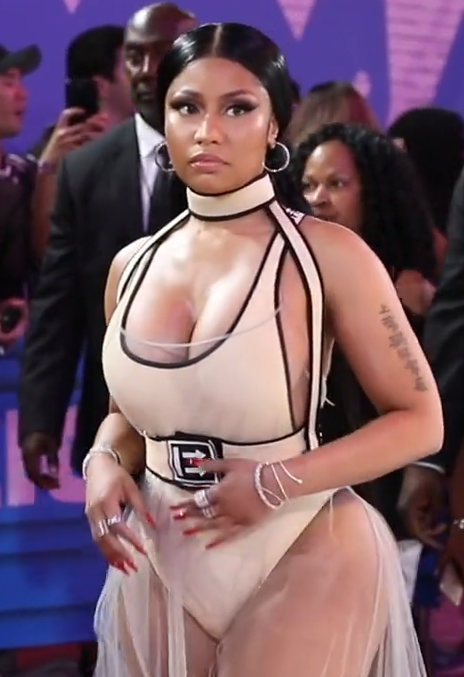
Minaj was praised for her vocals on the track.

"The Light Is Coming" received lukewarm reviews from music critics. Spin editor Israel Daramola described the song as a "glitchy, thumping" dance record with a sample that highlights Grande's "nursery rhyme-style melody" during the repeated chorus and her voice "is alive with feeling and thrives in the quirks and constant vibrancy of the music." He also praised Minaj for delivering a "strutting, paint-by-numbers verse in the time allotted" that is "perfectly suited to the heavy, ground shaking bass of the song". Brittany Spanos of Rolling Stone considered it a "weak spot" in the parent album.

== Commercial performance ==
"The Light Is Coming" entered the US Billboard Hot 100 at number 95 selling 14,000 copies in its first week, allowing it to also debut on the Digital Songs chart at number 22. The song fell off the Hot 100 the following week; however, it later re-entered at a new peak of number 89 following the release of Sweetener.

Worldwide, the song debuted in the top-forty in Hungary and Scotland, peaking at numbers 24 and 22 respectively, while charting within the top 100 in six other territories including the United Kingdom, where it reached number 57 on the UK Singles Chart. It also peaked at number 63 on the Canadian Hot 100.

== Music video ==
Despite the song not being released as an official single, the music video for the song first premiered twelve hours after the song's release, via the Reebok official website. It was directed by Dave Meyers, who had also directed the music video for Grande's "No Tears Left to Cry", and features Nicki Minaj performing her verse and Ariana Grande singing in a dimly-lit forest. The video was released worldwide on YouTube and Vevo the next day.

== Live performances ==
Grande performed a preview of the song at Wango Tango on June 2, 2018 and was on the set list of her Sweetener World Tour.

== Credits and personnel ==
Recording and management

- Recorded at Glenwood Place Studios (Burbank, California), Jungle City Studios (New York City), Chalice Recording Studios (Hollywood, California), The Lunchtable (Los Angeles, California and Conway Recording Studios (Hollywood, California)
- Nicki Minaj's vocals recorded at Germano Studios (New York City, New York)
- Mastered at Sterling Sound (New York City, New York)
- EMI Pop Music Publishing/More Water From Nazareth (GMR), Harajuku Barbie Music/Money Mack Music/Songs of Universal, Inc. (BMI), Universal Music Group Corp. (ASCAP)/GrandAriMusic (ASCAP)

Personnel

- Ariana Grande – lead vocals, songwriting
- Nicki Minaj – featured vocals, songwriting
- Pharrell Williams – songwriting, production
- Mike Larson – recording, digital editing, arrangement, additional programming
- Jacob Dennis – recording assistant
- Ramon Rivas – recording assistant
- Brendan Morawski – recording assistant
- Thomas Cullison – recording assistant
- Ben "Bengineer" Sedano – recording assistant
- Aubry "Big Juice" Delaine – Nicki Minaj's vocals recording
- Kris Crawford – Nicki Minaj's recording assistant
- Manny Park – Nicki Minaj's recording assistant
- Manny Marroquin – mixing
- Scott Desmarais – mix assistant
- Chris Galland – mix assistant
- Robin Florent – mix assistant
- Randy Merrill – mastering

Credits adapted from the liner notes of Sweetener.

== Charts ==
Chart performance for "The Light Is Coming"
Chart (2018)	Peak position
Australia (ARIA)	60
Canada Hot 100 (Billboard)	63
France Downloads (SNEP)	68
Greece Digital Songs (Billboard)	2
Hungary (Single Top 40)	24
Ireland (IRMA)	76
Japan Hot Overseas (Billboard)	12
Netherlands (Single Top 100)	81
New Zealand Heatseekers (Recorded Music NZ)	2
Portugal Digital Song Sales (Billboard)	7
Scottish Singles Sales (Official Charts)	22
UK Singles (Official Charts)	57
US Billboard Hot 100	89

== Certifications ==
Certifications for "The Light Is Coming"
Region	Certification	Certified units/sales
Australia (ARIA)	Gold	35,000^{‡}
Brazil (Pro-Música Brasil)	Platinum	40,000^{‡}
United Kingdom (BPI)	Silver	200,000^{‡}
^{‡} Sales+streaming figures based on certification alone.
