= Everytime (Ariana Grande song) =

2018 song by Ariana Grande

Song by Ariana Grande

from the album Sweetener
- Released: August 17, 2018
- Studio: MXM Studios (Los Angeles, CA); Wolf Cousins Studios (Stockholm, Sweden)
- Genre: Trap-pop; R&B; electronic
- Length: 2:52
- Songwriters: Ariana Grande; Ilya Salmanzadeh; Savan Kotecha; Max Martin
- Producers: Max Martin; Ilya

"Everytime" (stylized in lowercase) is a song by American singer Ariana Grande from her fourth studio album Sweetener, released in 2018. The song was written by Grande, Savan Kotecha and its producers Max Martin and Ilya Salmanzadeh.

== Development and composition ==
Rolling Stone's Elias Leight noted "At first Grande delivers an unyielding staccato rap, but she abruptly returns to supple singing on the line-ending phrase “back to you;” the effect is like a boxer following a series of short jabs with an uppercut. As more and more pop singers are forced to reckon with trap, the fusion achieved on “Everytime” offers them a path forward. Lyrically, Grande sings about being in a toxic relationship with an ex and how she couldn't get over someone even though she knew it was unhealthy to stay involved. She expresses feelings of desire and frustration in equal measure and the song makes references to drugs and alcohol, leading some fans to speculate that the song alludes to Grande's past relationship with rapper Mac Miller.

In his review, Taylor Weatherby of Billboard called the song an "upbeat" track. In August 2018, Grande shared on social media behind-the-scenes footage from the song's recording session in which she laughs while she is singing in reaction to Max Martin's inability to keep a straight face.

== Critical reception ==
Brittany Spanos of Rolling Stone called the song a "gorgeous, self-reflective break-up ballad". Stereogum's Chris DeVile noted "The brokenhearted trap-pop aesthetic definitely manifests on the sparkling Max Martin and Ilya production". In his review of the song, Israel Daramola of Spin wrote: "The best pop songs about love make you want to be in it, or remember it, or make you feel like you’re experiencing it, all of which is provoked at the onset of 'everytime's' twinkling production." Daramola also complimented Grande's "pristine" vocals and her relatable, convincing emotions.

== Credits and personnel ==
Credits adapted from Tidal.

- Ariana Grande – vocals, songwriter
- Max Martin – producer, songwriter, programmer, bass, drums
- Ilya Salmanzadeh – producer, songwriter, programmer, bass, drums
- Savan Kotecha – songwriter
- Sam Holland – recording engineer, studio personnel
- Cory Bice – assistant recording engineer, studio personnel
- Jeremy Lertola – assistant recording engineer, studio personnel
- Serban Ghenea – mixer, studio personnel
- John Hanes – mix engineer, studio personnel

== Live performances ==
Grande debuted the song live at The Sweetener Sessions. Grande performed a shortened version of the song at her Sweetener World Tour in 2019.

== Charts ==
Chart performance for "Everytime"
Chart (2018)	Peak position
Australia (ARIA)	36
Canada Hot 100 (Billboard)	51
Hungary (Single Top 40)	12
Hungary (Stream Top 40)	30
Netherlands (Single Top 100)	85
New Zealand Hot Singles (RMNZ)	4
Portugal (AFP)	38
Scottish Singles Sales (Official Charts)	92
Sweden Heatseeker (Sverigetopplistan)	2
UK Singles Downloads (Official Charts)	75
UK Audio Streaming (Official Charts)	36
US Billboard Hot 100	62

== Certifications ==
Certifications for "Everytime"
Region	Certification	Certified units/sales
Australia (ARIA)	Gold	35,000^{‡}
Brazil (Pro-Música Brasil)	2× Platinum	80,000^{‡}
New Zealand (RMNZ)	Gold	15,000^{‡}
United Kingdom (BPI)	Silver	200,000^{‡}
United States (RIAA)	Platinum	1,000,000^{‡}
^{‡} Sales+streaming figures based on certification alone.
