= No Tears Left to Cry =

2018 single by Ariana Grande

Single by Ariana Grande

from the album Sweetener
- Released: April 20, 2018
- Recorded: 2017
- Studio: Wolf Cousins (Stockholm); MXM (Stockholm)
- Genre: Dance-pop; disco; power pop; dance-R&B
- Length: 3:25
- Label: Republic
- Songwriters: Ariana Grande; Max Martin; Savan Kotecha; Ilya Salmanzadeh
- Producers: Max Martin; Ilya

Ariana Grande singles chronology
"Quit" (2017)	"No Tears Left to Cry" (2018)	"Dance to This" (2018)

Music video
- "No Tears Left to Cry" on YouTube

"No Tears Left to Cry" is a song by American singer-songwriter Ariana Grande. It was released on April 20, 2018, by Republic Records as the lead single from her fourth studio album, Sweetener (2018). The song was written by Grande and Savan Kotecha with its producers Max Martin and Ilya Salmanzadeh. An uptempo dance-pop, disco, power pop, and dance-R&B song driven by a UK garage beat, its lyrics reflect on Grande's efforts to move on following the Manchester Arena bombing, a terrorist attack on her concert the previous year, "celebrating rising above the world's negativity" with a "nearly spoken-word" vocalization.

The song received widespread acclaim from music critics, many of whom praised the song's positive message and optimistic composition. "No Tears Left to Cry" was nominated for various accolades, including an MTV Europe Music Award and an NRJ Music Award. In the US, "No Tears Left to Cry" entered the Billboard Hot 100 at number three, further extending her record as being the only artist to debut in the top ten with the lead single from all of her studio albums. It became her third single to top the US Mainstream Top 40 airplay chart. Internationally, the song topped the charts in thirteen countries, including Australia, Ireland and Norway.

An accompanying music video directed by Dave Meyers premiered on YouTube that same day to critical acclaim. It explores a concept of disorientation in life, and the complexities and disillusionment of the world. It received four nominations at the 2018 MTV Video Music Awards, including Video of the Year, later winning Best Pop.

== Background ==
Following the Manchester Arena bombing during her Dangerous Woman Tour in May 2017, Ariana Grande became reluctant to record new music, preferring to spend time with her loved ones because of the emotional impact the tour had on her. "No Tears Left to Cry" was the first song Grande wrote with Max Martin, Ilya and Savan Kotecha for Sweetener, after working with Pharrell Williams for most of the album. She wanted her first single since the bombing to be hopeful and touch on the incident, but not dwell on it. The song came about when Grande said, "I want it to be positive and talk about positivity and love. I don't have any tears left to cry." Martin then sang the chorus melody. They composed the music before writing the lyrics.

Grande intended for "No Tears Left to Cry" to bridge a change in sound from her previous album Dangerous Woman (2016) by being more obscure and unexpected, inspired by her work with Williams, and thus suggested its verses and chorus to be in different keys. Kotecha cited Lauryn Hill's The Miseducation of Lauryn Hill and En Vogue's "Don't Let Go (Love)" as inspiration for the track's chord changes. Grande also wanted it to start as a ballad and then become uptempo like "I Will Survive" by Gloria Gaynor. Kotecha recalled, "It was important to her to start as a ballad and Max and Ilya started playing those chords and it just fit; it was magical. It all came together and had this flow." However, a lot of time was spent working on the pre-chorus until Ilya found a fixed groove. According to Kotecha, they opted for simpler lyrics to make the song "digestible" and "easier to grasp" because of its already complex chord changes and melodic shifts. The track was recorded at MXM and Wolf Cousins Studios in Stockholm, Sweden. Grande said she hoped for it to bring light and comfort, and encourage listeners to dance and "live ya best life!"

== Composition ==
"No Tears Left to Cry" is a dance-pop, power pop, disco, and dance-R&B song. The song is in 4/4 time and is originally in the key of A minor, with a tempo of 122 beats per minute. The refrain is based on an Am–G–F–Am–G–F–C–Dm–Am–C chord progression, while the verses follow an A_{(add2)}–F_{(add2)}–G_{(add2)} sequence. Grande's vocal range spans from G_{3} to G_{5}.

Lyrically, the song is about optimism; according to Rolling Stone, it "celebrates rising above the world's negativity". Variety noted that the song's chorus contrastingly features Grande alternating between "lifting her voice, pleadingly, for positivity" with the lyrics "Oh, I just want you to come with me / We're on another mentality", and "rhythmically" chanting "I'm lovin', I’m livin', I'm pickin' it up" with a "nearly spoken-word" vocalization.

== Release ==
Variety initially reported on April 9, 2018 that the track would be released on April 27, 2018. Grande began teasing social media on April 15, 2018, using teardrop emojis and the song's title written as "ʎɹɔ oʇ ʇɟǝl sɹɐǝʇ ou". The title appeared on billboards across the US and featured on grey sweatshirts worn on social media by Grande, her half-brother Frankie and then-boyfriend Mac Miller. A listening party in London was also held. The song premiered worldwide at midnight ET on April 20, 2018, as the lead single from Grande's fourth studio album, Sweetener. The grey sweatshirts were made available for purchase on Grande's website the following day, bundled with a digital copy of the track. In the US, "No Tears Left to Cry" was sent to hot adult contemporary radio stations on April 23, 2018, and to rhythmic contemporary and contemporary hit radio stations the next day.

== Critical reception ==
"No Tears Left to Cry" received universal acclaim from music critics upon its release. Meaghan Garvey of Pitchfork said it is a musical progression for Grande and her vocals surpass those of her peers. According to Garvey, the song is "striking in its optimism: the soundtrack for the exact moment you decide to keep going." Similarly, The Observer deemed it "a dazzling exercise in pop lightness, bringing optimism after last year's Manchester attack." In The Guardian, Laura Snapes gave it four out of five stars, citing it as a "timeless sad song" and akin to Grande's One Love Manchester concert as "one of the most joyful, defiant celebrations of pop and the communities it inspires". Joel Golby, also from The Guardian, found the song expansive and appropriate, complimenting Grande's high notes and unconventional adlibs. Matt Mellis of Consequence of Sound noted Grande's skill in cadence change and a lasting relevancy through hope and resilience.

In NME, Nick Reilly complimented the track's "hugely infectious" chorus, while Hannah Mylrea regarded it as euphoria and concluded, "Tackling hate and devastation with hope and disco, 'No Tears Left to Cry' is a triumph." Matthew Kent of The Line of Best Fit commented, "Ariana is picking it up while we're turning this up", and said she "certainly pulled it out of the bag". Fact gave the track a score of 7.7 out of 10, describing it as "somber but triumphant and even though it includes cringy lyrics... it packs a punch." In his review for Billboard, Andrew Unterberger wrote that the song is "a grower, not to be fully appreciated on first listen." Writing for Variety, Chris Willman called it "the breeziest, most danceable kind of post-traumatic recovery anthem", but said "it's not likely to ever be inducted into the Max Martin Hall of Fame". Spencer Kornhaber, in The Atlantic, called the song "one of the best pure pop singles in memory. ... Grande’s voice curls in surprising ways, from husky to flighty and back. Most glorious are the keyboards: The progressions verge on jazziness, with each chord stabbed out in a manner that evokes someone touching a hot surface. The lyrics describe being all cried out, but the arrangement clearly suggests a flood of tears on the dance floor." In a May 2018 Time magazine cover article, Sam Lansky says of the song:

"Grande made a song about resilience because she has had to be resilient, in ways that are difficult to imagine, after a terrorist detonated a bomb outside her May 22, 2017, concert in Manchester, England, killing 22 people and leaving more than 500 injured. What happened is part of the song, but the song is not about what happened. Instead of being elegiac, it's joyful and lush".

Stereogum ranked "No Tears Left to Cry" as the ninth best song of the 2010s, praising it as "glittering and triumphant, grand and unapologetic [...] The song exudes the magic of moving forward and marked a new era of Grande. She graduates from the glitzy trend-pop that dominated her earlier work, transforming her grief and recovery into a soaring dance ballad. It has all the elements of a first-rate Ariana Grande song — her iconic vocal range is stretched for all its worth, backed by a contagious shuffling beat — and adds a new strength to her resume: vulnerability." NME ranked it as the best song of 2018 in their year-end poll, and ranked it at number 28 on their "Best Songs of the Decade" list. Time Out ranked "No Tears Left to Cry" as the 25th best pop song of all time. The Guardian and Rolling Stone both named it as Grande's second best song, behind "Into You".

== Accolades ==
Accolades for "No Tears Left to Cry"
Year	Organization	Award	Result	Ref.
2018	MTV Europe Music Awards	Best Video	Nominated	
2018	MTV Europe Music Awards	Best Song	Nominated	
2018	MTV Video Music Awards	Video of the Year	Nominated	
2018	MTV Video Music Awards	Best Pop	Won	
2018	MTV Video Music Awards	Best Cinematography	Nominated	
2018	MTV Video Music Awards	Best Visual Effects	Nominated	
2018	MTV Video Music Awards Japan	Best Female Video – International	Won	
2018	Nickelodeon Mexico Kids' Choice Awards	Favorite Hit	Nominated	
2018	NRJ Music Awards	International Song of the Year	Nominated	
2018	NRJ Music Awards	Video of the Year	Nominated	
2018	People's Choice Awards	Song of the Year	Nominated	
2018	People's Choice Awards	Music Video of the Year	Nominated	
2018	Teen Choice Awards	Choice Song: Female Artist	Nominated	
2018	Teen Choice Awards	Choice Pop Song	Nominated	
2019	Global Awards	Best Song	Nominated	

== Commercial performance ==
=== North America ===
On the US Billboard Hot 100, "No Tears Left to Cry" debuted at number three (barred from the top by the Drake songs "Nice For What" and "God's Plan") with sales of 100,000 digital downloads sold in its opening week according to Nielsen Music, debuting atop the Billboard Hot Digital Songs chart and becoming Grande's third chart-topper there. The track drew in 36.9 million streams from the time of its release, allowing it to debut at number five on the Streaming Songs chart, and received early radio support causing it to enter Billboard's Radio Songs chart at number 35 with 27 million audience impressions. The single became Grande's ninth top-ten single and her highest debut on the Hot 100 (tied with her 2014 single "Problem") at the time. The song also marked her sixth top-ten debut, thus tying Grande with Lady Gaga and Rihanna in sixth among acts with most top 10 debuts on the chart. Grande also continued her record for being the first artist to debut within the opening ten positions of the chart with every lead single—"The Way", "Problem", and "Dangerous Woman"—of her first four studio albums. Following the release of Sweetener, the song rebounded into the Hot 100's top ten at number seven in its eighteenth week on the chart, rising five positions from number 12 the previous week, allowing it to notch a 12th week within the top ten. In March 2019, "No Tears Left to Cry" was certified triple platinum by the Recording Industry Association of America for shipments exceeding three million units in the United States.

On the Billboard Mainstream Top 40, "No Tears Left to Cry" debuted at number 30 as the highest entry of the week, rising to number 22 the following week. The song eventually topped the chart on the issue dated July 21, 2018, becoming her third number one on the chart following "Problem" in 2014, and "Side to Side" in 2016. The song has also reached a peak of number three on the Radio Songs chart, number four on the Adult Top 40, number 12 on the Rhythmic Songs chart, and number 16 on the Adult Contemporary chart. On the Billboard Dance Club Songs, it reached number-one on the magazine's June 23, 2018 issue, becoming her second number-one hit on the chart and first as lead artist. She also became the first female artist ever to have two number one hit songs on the chart. In Canada, the song became Grande's highest-charting single at the time, entering in the runner-up position on the Canadian Hot 100, behind Drake's "Nice for What", while debuting atop the Canadian Digital Song Sales chart. The track was later certified platinum by Music Canada in July 2018 for shipments of 80,000 units.

=== Europe, Oceania and Asia ===
In Australia, "No Tears Left to Cry" debuted at the summit of the ARIA Singles Chart, making it Grande's first number one and sixth top-ten single in Australia. The single was later certified platinum by the Australian Recording Industry Association (ARIA) for exceeding the 70,000 sales limit in June 2018. In New Zealand, it entered the New Zealand Singles Chart at number four, becoming her sixth top-ten single there, as well as being certified quadruple platinum for sales exceeding 120,000 units there. In the United Kingdom, the song debuted at number two on the UK Singles Chart for the issue dated May 3, 2018 with first-week sales of 74,290 units, marking Grande's sixth top-ten single in the territory. It was held off the top spot by Calvin Harris and Dua Lipa's "One Kiss" for two consecutive weeks. The track was certified double platinum by the British Phonographic Industry (BPI) for selling over 1.2 million units. As of March 2021, "No Tears Left To Cry" is Grande's second most-streamed song in the United Kingdom and overall 15th most-streamed song by a female artist in the country. In Ireland, the song debuted on the Irish Singles Chart at number one becoming Grande's second number one single and her fourth top-ten entry in the country. Across Europe, the song topped the charts in Czech Republic, Hungary, Norway, Portugal and Slovakia, reached the top five in Austria, Germany, Finland, Netherlands (Single Top 100), Poland and Switzerland, and the top ten in Belgium (Flanders), Denmark, Italy, Spain and Sweden.

"No Tears Left to Cry" saw success in Japan as well, peaking at number 12 on the Japan Hot 100, becoming her sixth top-twenty single in the country. It also debuted at number six on the Japanese Hot Overseas chart, and reached number one in its fifth week there. In Malaysia, the song debuted at number one on the official RIM Charts and stayed at the top of the chart for four consecutive weeks. On South Korea's International Gaon Digital Chart, the song peaked at number 19.

== Music video ==
=== Development and release ===
A revolving hallway was created for the video (above), which allowed Grande to move on walls and ceilings (below).

The music video for "No Tears Left to Cry" was directed by Dave Meyers and produced by Nathan Scherrer. It explores a concept of disorientation in life, and the complexities and disillusionment of the world. "We sort of flirt with the ambiguity of whether you need to find the ground or whether the ground's just what you make of it," Meyers said. Grande was filmed in front of screens to chroma key locations in post-production. Referencing dancer Fred Astaire, a revolving hallway was built to allow Grande to walk on ceilings and walls. Other stunts involved her harnessed to a rotating stairway and jumping through a chute. Grande's face was covered in a green substance and bandaged for 30 minutes to create masks of her face. The music video premiered on Vevo at midnight ET on April 20, 2018. Three behind-the-scenes videos were released on April 23, April 27, and May 25, 2018, respectively.

=== Synopsis ===
Grande wears six different outfits in the music video, including a voluminous green gown, satin minidress and Stuart Weitzman platform shoes. She also eschews her signature high ponytail for styles such as a braided and low ponytail. The video begins with an extended choral introduction and an evening bird's-eye view of a metropolis of skyscrapers sideways, overhead and underfoot. Grande is first shown reclining on a window-lined hallway before walking on its walls and ceiling in an optical illusion. She then falls through the floor into a wall with fairy lights, and is shown swinging from the banister of a fire escape overlooking the city.

In another scene, the singer and a troupe of suited dancers perform with umbrellas from the sides of a skyscraper. Grande then falls through the sky ahead of an interlude featuring a kaleidoscope of her face. The next segment shows Grande seated on a ceiling removing her face like a mask while also surrounded by multiple versions of her face showing multiple expressions and singing. In the last scene, Grande sits in a field at sunrise, playing fetch with her dog, Toulouse. The video concludes with a worker bee flying off screen, one of the symbols of Manchester.

=== Reception ===
The video received critical acclaim. Emily Heward of the Manchester Evening News called it "a touching tribute" to Manchester, noting that its symbolic worker bee represents the city's resilience. Similarly, MTV UK's Ross McNeilage said the video "perfectly encapsulates the dream-like euphoria of the song and is a beautiful, subtle tribute". McNeilage deemed it "a truly stunning visual that is undoubtedly her best music video to date." Charles Holmes of MTV likened it to visuals by M. C. Escher and praised the juxtaposition of moods, writing, "Instead of Ariana telling us her world was turned upside down the video shows us... The dark muted video feels like sadness, while Ariana's voice sounds like triumph."

Chris Willman of Variety described the music video as "a combination of Inception and Fred Astaire's old dancing-on-the-ceiling movie musical routine". Calin van Paris of Vogue called it "an Inception-style dreamworld", and regarded Grande's braided ponytail as "a surprising twist on a classic updo" and "a high-impact aesthetic". In Billboard magazine, Abby Jones viewed the visual as a spectacle, finding it "dazzling and dizzying", while Shanté Honeycutt deemed it "a beautiful, mind-bending video". Spencer Kornhaber wrote in The Atlantic: The video ... is lush and transporting, aestheticizing the idea of one's feet searching for solid ground."

As of August 2025, the video has received over 1.2 billion views on YouTube and surpassed Grande's 2015 single "Focus" to become her most-viewed video in its first day and first week of release (15 and 51.7 million views, respectively), being later beaten by Grande's single "Thank U, Next" released the same year. The music video won the Best Pop award at the 2018 MTV Video Music Awards and was nominated for Video of the Year, Best Cinematography and Best Visual Effects.

== Live performances ==
Grande first performed "No Tears Left to Cry" during Kygo's set at the second weekend of Coachella Valley Music and Arts Festival on April 20, 2018. On May 1, 2018, she gave her first televised performance of the song on The Tonight Show Starring Jimmy Fallon. She later performed the song on the same show on May 14, along with Fallon and The Roots, using Nintendo Labo and Nintendo Switch-based instruments. Grande also opened the 2018 Billboard Music Awards on May 20 with a performance of the song. She also performed the song, along with "Side to Side" and "Dangerous Woman", at YouTube Brandcast. The song is also featured on the set list for her Sweetener World Tour.

== Track listings ==
Digital download

1. "No Tears Left to Cry" – 3:25

CD single

1. "No Tears Left to Cry" – 3:25
2. "No Tears Left to Cry" (instrumental) – 3:25

== Credits and personnel ==
Credits and personnel are adapted from the liner notes of Sweetener.

Recording and management

- Recorded at MXM Studios and Wolf Cousins Studios (Stockholm, Sweden)
- Mixed at MixStar Studios (Virginia Beach, Virginia)
- Mastered at Sterling Sound (New York City, New York)
- Published by Universal Music Group Corp./Grand AriMusic (ASCAP), MXM (ASCAP) — administered by Kobalt (ASCAP) —, Wolf Cousins (STIM) and Warner/Chappell Music Scand (STIM)

Personnel

- Ariana Grande – lead vocals, background vocals, songwriting, vocal arrangement, vocal production
- Max Martin – songwriting, production, programming, drums, keys, bass, percussion
- Ilya Salmanzadeh – songwriting, production, programming, drums, keys, percussion
- Savan Kotecha – songwriting
- Sam Holland – engineering
- Cory Bice – engineering assistant
- Jeremy Lertola – engineering assistant
- Serban Ghenea – mixing
- John Hanes – mixing, engineering
- Randy Merrill – mastering

== Charts ==
=== Weekly charts ===
Weekly chart performance
Chart (2018)	Peak position
Argentina (Argentina Hot 100)	78
Australia (ARIA)	1
Austria (Ö3 Austria Top 40)	2
Belgium (Ultratop 50 Flanders)	5
Belgium (Ultratop 50 Wallonia)	13
Bolivia (Monitor Latino)	13
Brazil (Top 100 Brasil)	94
Canada Hot 100 (Billboard)	2
Canada AC (Billboard)	9
Canada CHR/Top 40 (Billboard)	2
Canada Hot AC (Billboard)	4
Colombia (National-Report)	54
Costa Rica (Monitor Latino)	2
Croatia Airplay (HRT)	7
Czech Republic Airplay (ČNS IFPI)	5
Czech Republic Singles Digital (ČNS IFPI)	1
Denmark (Tracklisten)	6
Dominican Republic (SODINPRO)	17
Ecuador (National-Report)	59
El Salvador (Monitor Latino)	16
Estonia (IFPI)	1
Euro Digital Songs (Billboard)	2
Finland (Suomen virallinen lista)	2
France (SNEP)	13
Germany (GfK)	2
Greece Digital Singles (IFPI)	1
Guatemala (Monitor Latino)	2
Hong Kong (HKRIA)	3
Hungary (Rádiós Top 40)	15
Hungary (Single Top 40)	1
Hungary (Stream Top 40)	1
Iceland (Tónlistinn)	1
Ireland (IRMA)	1
Israel (Media Forest)	1
Italy (FIMI)	6
Japan Hot 100 (Billboard)	12
Lebanon (OLT20)	6
Malaysia (RIM)	1
Mexico (Billboard Mexican Airplay)	3
Netherlands (Dutch Top 40)	2
Netherlands (Mega Top 50)	2
Netherlands (Single Top 100)	4
New Zealand (Recorded Music NZ)	4
Norway (VG-lista)	1
Panama (Monitor Latino)	9
Poland Airplay (ZPAV)	3
Portugal (AFP)	1
Romania (Airplay 100)	77
Scottish Singles Sales (Official Charts)	2
Singapore (RIAS)	1
Slovakia Airplay (ČNS IFPI)	28
Slovakia Singles Digital (ČNS IFPI)	1
Slovenia (SloTop50)	3
South Korea International (Gaon Chart)	19
Spain (Promusicae)	9
Sweden (Sverigetopplistan)	10
Switzerland (Schweizer Hitparade)	2
UK Singles (Official Charts)	2
US Billboard Hot 100	3
US Adult Contemporary (Billboard)	16
US Adult Pop Airplay (Billboard)	4
US Dance Club Songs (Billboard)	1
US Dance Airplay (Billboard)	3
US Pop Airplay (Billboard)	1
US Rhythmic Airplay (Billboard)	12
Venezuela (National-Report)	94

=== Monthly charts ===
Monthly chart performance
Chart (2018)	Peak position
Brazil Streaming (Pro-Música Brasil)	33

=== Year-end charts ===
2018 year-end chart performance for "No Tears Left to Cry"
Chart (2018)	Position
Argentina (Monitor Latino)	94
Australia (ARIA)	26
Austria (Ö3 Austria Top 40)	53
Belgium (Ultratop Flanders)	17
Belgium (Ultratop Wallonia)	32
Canada (Canadian Hot 100)	13
Denmark (Tracklisten)	42
Estonia (IFPI)	18
France (SNEP)	86
Germany (Official German Charts)	61
Hungary (Rádiós Top 40)	64
Hungary (Single Top 40)	20
Hungary (Stream Top 40)	20
Iceland (Tónlistinn)	5
Ireland (IRMA)	10
Japan (Japan Hot 100)	89
Japan Hot Overseas (Billboard)	5
Japan Streaming Songs (Billboard Japan)	61
Netherlands (Dutch Top 40)	9
Netherlands (Mega Top 50)	8
Netherlands (Single Top 100)	34
New Zealand (Recorded Music NZ)	46
Poland (ZPAV)	39
Portugal (AFP)	40
Slovenia (SloTop50)	18
Sweden (Sverigetopplistan)	45
Switzerland (Schweizer Hitparade)	36
UK Singles (Official Charts Company)	9
US Billboard Hot 100	20
US Adult Contemporary (Billboard)	39
US Adult Top 40 (Billboard)	16
US Dance Club Songs (Billboard)	23
US Dance/Mix Show Airplay (Billboard)	10
US Mainstream Top 40 (Billboard)	14
US Radio Songs (Billboard)	16
US Rhythmic (Billboard)	45

2019 year-end chart performance for "No Tears Left to Cry"
Chart (2019)	Position
Slovenia (SloTop50)	37

== Certifications and sales ==
Certifications and sales
Region	Certification	Certified units/sales
Australia (ARIA)	6× Platinum	420,000^{‡}
Austria (IFPI Austria)	Platinum	30,000^{‡}
Belgium (BRMA)	Platinum	40,000^{‡}
Brazil (Pro-Música Brasil)	3× Diamond	480,000^{‡}
Canada (Music Canada)	7× Platinum	560,000^{‡}
Denmark (IFPI Danmark)	Platinum	90,000^{‡}
France (SNEP)	Diamond	333,333^{‡}
Germany (BVMI)	Gold	200,000^{‡}
Hungary (MAHASZ)	Gold	2,000^{‡}
Italy (FIMI)	Platinum	50,000^{‡}
Mexico (AMPROFON)	2× Platinum	120,000^{‡}
New Zealand (RMNZ)	4× Platinum	120,000^{‡}
Norway (IFPI Norway)	3× Platinum	180,000^{‡}
Poland (ZPAV)	4× Platinum	80,000^{‡}
Portugal (AFP)	Platinum	10,000^{‡}
Spain (Promusicae)	Platinum	60,000^{‡}
United Kingdom (BPI)	3× Platinum	1,800,000
United States (RIAA)	6× Platinum	6,000,000^{‡}
Streaming
Sweden (GLF)	3× Platinum	24,000,000^{†}
^{‡} Sales+streaming figures based on certification alone.^{†} Streaming-only figures based on certification alone.

== Release history ==
"No Tears Left to Cry" release history
Region	Date	Format(s)	Version	Label(s)	Ref.
Various	April 20, 2018	Digital download; streaming	Original	Republic	
Australia	April 20, 2018	Radio airplay	Original	Republic; Universal Australia	
United States	April 23, 2018	Adult contemporary radio; hot adult contemporary radio; modern adult contemporary radio	Original	Republic	
United States	April 24, 2018	Contemporary hit radio; rhythmic contemporary radio	Original	Republic	
Italy	April 27, 2018	Radio airplay	Original	Universal	
Germany	June 15, 2018	CD	2-track	Universal	

== See also ==
- List of Billboard Hot 100 top-ten singles in 2018
- List of Billboard Mainstream Top 40 number-one songs of 2018
- List of number-one singles of 2018 (Australia)
- List of number-one singles of 2018 (Ireland)
- List of number-one singles of the 2010s (Hungary)
- List of number-one singles of 2018 (Portugal)
- List of number-one songs of 2018 (Malaysia)
- List of number-one songs of 2018 (Singapore)
- List of number-one digital songs of 2018 (U.S.)
- List of UK Singles Downloads Chart number ones of the 2010s
- List of number-one dance singles of 2018 (U.S.)
- List of Billboard Dance/Mix Show Airplay number-one singles of 2018
