= R.E.M. (song) =

2018 song by Ariana Grande

Song by Ariana Grande

from the album Sweetener
- Released: August 17, 2018
- Studio: Midnight Blue (Miami); Conway (Hollywood)
- Genre: R&B
- Length: 4:06
- Label: Republic
- Songwriters: Pharrell Williams; Ariana Grande
- Producer: Pharrell Williams

"R.E.M." is a song by American singer Ariana Grande from her fourth studio album Sweetener, released in August 17, 2018, alongside the rest of the album. It was written by Grande and Pharrell Williams, with production being handled by the latter. The song's title inspired the name for Grande's makeup brand, R.E.M. Beauty.

== Background and composition ==
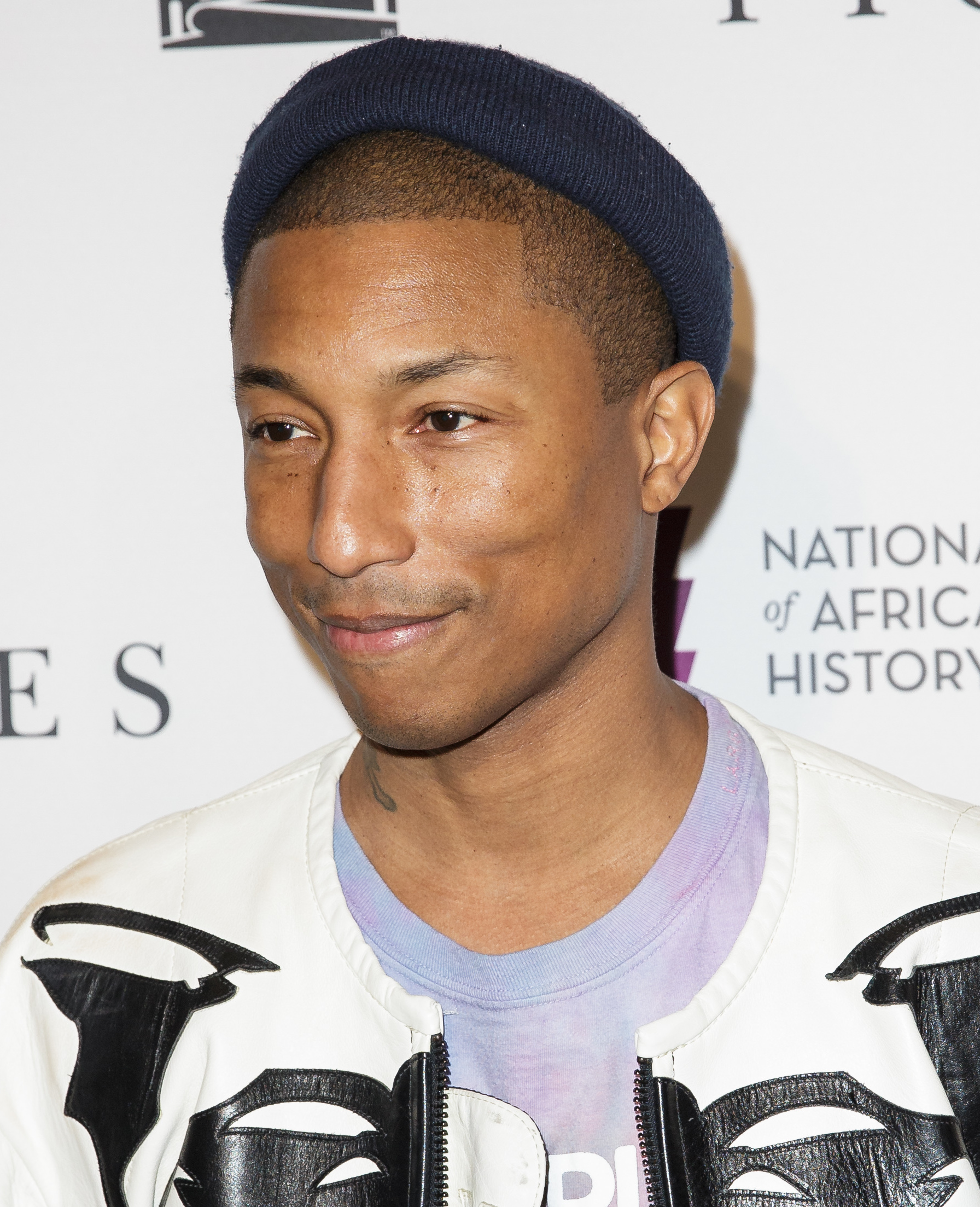
"R.E.M" was written and produced by Pharrell Williams (pictured in 2016).

"R.E.M." is a R&B song containing a doo-wop beat. It runs for a duration of four minutes and six seconds. The song "Dream" was originally recorded as a demo by T-Pain on March 12, 2011, and ran for a duration of four minutes and 27 seconds. It was then passed onto Beyoncé and recorded under the title "Wake Up" in 2013. Grande kept the chorus, but changed the song's bridge. She previewed "R.E.M" prior to the release of Sweetener.

The song's title refers to rapid eye movement sleep, and is about "a relationship that blurs between the dreamworld and reality". Grande has said "R.E.M." is about "dreaming someone into your life", and is one of her favorite tracks on Sweetener. Grande's vocals span 2 octaves, from Eb3 to Eb5.

== Reception ==
"R.E.M." received mixed reception from music critics. In 2018, Complex's Mallorie List ranked "R.E.M." number two on her list of "The Best Ariana Grande Songs". Christopher Rosa of Glamour called the song's lyrics "a tad generic". Out's Dennis Hinzmann said the track "feels like a throwback and a fresh pick all at the same time".

== Live performances ==
Grande first premiered a 20-second snippet of the song on Elle magazine's Youtube channel, during their game "Song Association" on July 12, 2018. Grande also performed a snippet of the song on The Tonight Show Starring Jimmy Fallon on August 16, 2018. The song was officially debuted live on August 20, 2018 at The Sweetener Sessions.

She also performed the song live on BBC Radio 1 in September 2018, and on the one-hour special, Ariana Grande at the BBC, which was recorded on September 7, 2018, and aired on November 1.

This song was included on the set list of Grande's Sweetener World Tour.

== Credits and personnel ==
Credits and personnel adapted from the liner notes of Sweetener.

Recording and management

- Recorded at Midnight Blue Studios (Miami, Florida) and Conway Recording Studios (Hollywood, California)
- Mixed at Callanwolde Fine Arts Center (Atlanta, Georgia)
- Mastered at Sterling Sound (New York City)

Personnel

- Ariana Grande – lead vocals
- Pharrell Williams – songwriting, production, additional vocals
- Andrew Coleman – recording, digital editing and arrangement for I Am Other Entertainment
- Mike Larson – recording, digital editing, arrangement and additional programming for I Am Other Entertainment
- Guilhermo Lefeld – recording assistant
- Jon Sher – recording assistant
- Phil Tan – mixing
- Bill Zimmerman – additional engineering
- Randy Merrill – mastering

== Charts ==
Chart (2018)	Peak position
Australia (ARIA)	52
Canada (Canadian Hot 100)	68
Hungary (Single Top 40)	35
Netherlands (Single Top 100)	100
Portugal (AFP)	67
Sweden Heatseeker (Sverigetopplistan)	16
UK Singles Downloads (Official Charts)	89
UK Audio Streaming (Official Charts)	45
US Billboard Hot 100	72

== Certifications ==
Certifications for "R.E.M."
Region	Certification	Certified units/sales
Australia (ARIA)	Gold	35,000^{‡}
Brazil (Pro-Música Brasil)	Platinum	40,000^{‡}
New Zealand (RMNZ)	Gold	15,000^{‡}
United Kingdom (BPI)	Silver	200,000^{‡}
^{‡} Sales+streaming figures based on certification alone.

== See also ==
- Pharrell Williams production discography
