= List of Ariana Grande live performances =

Ariana Grande live performances
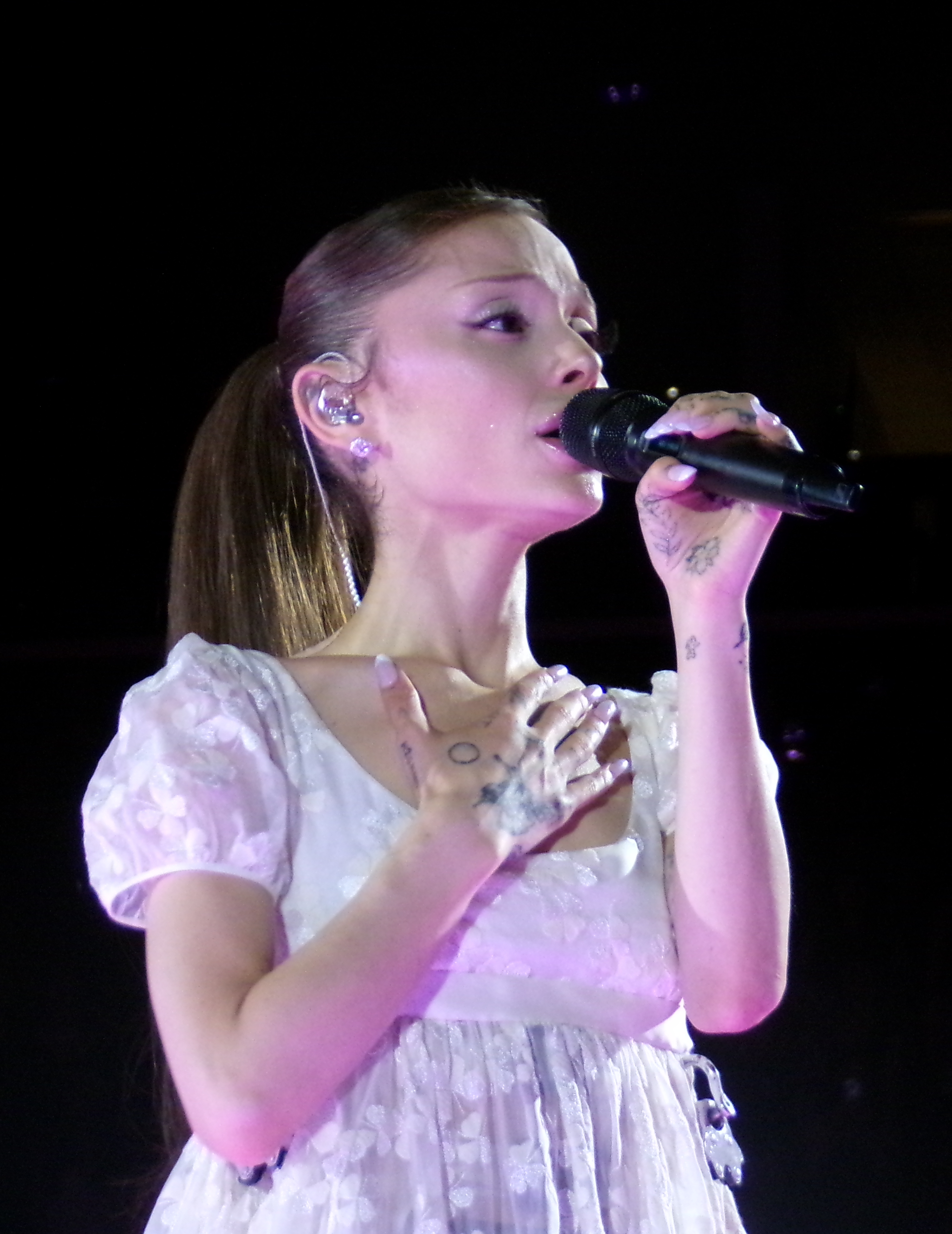
- Grande performing at Barclays Center during the Eternal Sunshine Tour in 2026
- Concert tours: 5
- Promotional tours: 1
- Headlined events: 5
- Live performances: 43
- Videography: 90

American singer, songwriter, and actress Ariana Grande released her debut studio album, Yours Truly, in 2013; since then, she has performed five concert tours, three of which were worldwide. According to Billboard, Grande has sold 3.4 million tickets and grossed $351.4 million from 270 reported shows, as of 2026. She has also performed at various award shows, music festivals, and television programmes.

Grande promoted Yours Truly in 2013 and 2014 at the Wango Tango and the 2013 MTV Video Music Awards. Her first concert tour, the Listening Sessions (2013), visited North America and grossed over $679,360. She also served as an opening act for Justin Bieber on selected dates of his Believe Tour in 2013 in Florida for three nights. Grande's first world tour, the Honeymoon Tour (2015), promoted her second studio album, My Everything (2014). The 88-show tour visited North America, Europe, Asia, and Latin America and grossed $41.8 million, with a total attendance of 808,667.

Grande's Dangerous Woman Tour supporting her third studio album, Dangerous Woman (2016)—which ran from February to September 2017—visited North America, Europe, Latin America, Asia, and Oceania. In December 2017, several media sources reported that the tour had grossed over $71 million. On May 22, 2017, a terrorist attack occurred at Grande's concert at the Manchester Arena in England, known as the Manchester Arena bombing. In response, she performed a benefit concert named One Love Manchester. The 50,000-capacity venue sold out within 20 minutes. It took place at Old Trafford Cricket Ground and was attended by 55,000 people. Guest performers included Coldplay, Take That, Imogen Heap, Pharrell Williams, Robbie Williams, U2, and Liam Gallagher, among others.

On August 8, 2018, Grande announced the Sweetener Sessions, a promotional tour for her fourth studio album, Sweetener (2018). The concert series had three stops in North America and a fourth in London. Later that month, she announced on Good Morning America that the Sweetener tour was scheduled to begin in February 2019; however, she postponed the tour due to severe "illness". In October 2018, Grande announced her fourth concert tour, the Sweetener World Tour, in support of both Sweetener and her fifth studio album, Thank U, Next (2019), which commenced in March 2019. The Sweetener World Tour was attended by 1.3 million people and grossed $146.6 million from 97 shows, surpassing the Dangerous Woman Tour as her highest-grossing tour as of 2025. In January 2019, it was announced that Grande was a headline act for the Coachella Valley Music and Arts Festival, becoming the youngest artist and the fourth female artist to headline the event. Also, in February and March 2019, it was announced that she woud headline Manchester Pride and Lollapalooza. Her fifth tour, the Eternal Sunshine Tour, ran from June to September 2026 and primarily supported her seventh studio album, Eternal Sunshine (2024). The tour grossed $107.9 million and sold 638,000 tickets from 41 dates. It became her biggest tour by average per night.

Since her 2013 debut, Grande has featured in live performances with other artists across a range of genres. In 2014, she performed "Bang Bang" alongside Nicki Minaj and Jessie J at the MTV Video Music Awards and the American Music Awards. Grande and Babyface performed a tribute to Stevie Wonder, covering his song "Signed, Sealed, Delivered I'm Yours". They performed the song at the "Stevie Wonder: Songs in the Key of Life" concert in 2015, a television special saluting Wonder. She later featured alongside Wonder on The Voice series finale performing his single "Faith". In 2020, Grande performed "Rain on Me" with Lady Gaga at the 2020 MTV Video Music Awards. She performed a remix of "Save Your Tears" with the Weeknd at the 2021 iHeartRadio Music Awards. On March 2, 2025, Grande and her Wicked co-star Cynthia Erivo opened the 97th Academy Awards ceremony with a medley of "Over the Rainbow", "Home", and "Defying Gravity".

== Concert tours ==
Title	Dates	Associated album(s)	Continent(s)	Shows	Gross	Attendance	Ref.
The Listening Sessions	August 13, 2013 – September 22, 2013	Yours Truly	North America	11	$679,360	25,261	
The Honeymoon Tour	February 25, 2015 – October 25, 2015	My Everything	North America; Europe; Asia; Latin America	88	$41,800,000	808,667	
Dangerous Woman Tour	February 3, 2017 – September 21, 2017	Dangerous Woman	North America; Europe; Latin America; Asia; Oceania	77	$71,000,000	853,554	
Sweetener World Tour	March 18, 2019 – December 22, 2019	Sweetener; Thank U, Next	North America; Europe	100	$146,400,000	1,300,000	
The Eternal Sunshine Tour	June 6, 2026 – September 1, 2026	Eternal Sunshine	North America; Europe	41	$107,900,000	638,000	

== Promotional tours ==
Title	Dates	Associated album(s)	Cities	Shows	Ref.
The Sweetener Sessions	August 20, 2018 – September 4, 2018	Sweetener	New York City; Chicago; Los Angeles; London	4	

== Headlined events ==
Event	Date	Description	City	Country	Ref.
One Love Manchester	June 4, 2017	Benefit concert in response to the Manchester Arena bombing	Manchester	England	
Coachella 2019	April 14 – April 21, 2019	Music and arts festival	Indio	United States	
Lollapalooza	August 4, 2019	Music festival	Chicago	United States	
Manchester Pride	August 25, 2019	LGBT pride festival and parade	Manchester	England	

== Live performances ==
=== Yours Truly ===
Event	Date	Country
Wango Tango	May 11, 2013	United States
Kiss 108 Kiss Concert	May 18, 2013	United States
The Ellen DeGeneres Show	May 29, 2013	United States
103.3 AMP BDAY BASH	June 30, 2013	United States
2013 MTV Video Music Awards (Pre-show)	August 25, 2013	United States
The Today Show	September 3, 2013	United States
2013 WorldWide Day of Play	September 21, 2013	United States
Jimmy Kimmel Live!	October 15, 2013	United States
Dancing with the Stars	October 21, 2013	United States
American Music Awards of 2013	November 24, 2013	United States
Rockefeller Plaza Tree Lighting	November 26, 2013	United States
Macy's Thanksgiving Day Parade	November 28, 2013	United States
KIIS-FM Jingle Ball	December 6, 2013	United States
KDWB-FM Jingle Ball	December 10, 2013	United States
Z100 Jingle Ball	December 13, 2013	United States
B96 Jingle Bash	December 14, 2013	United States
FLZ Jingle Ball	December 18, 2013	United States
Women of Soul: In Performance at the White House	March 6, 2014	United States
White House Easter Egg Roll	April 21, 2014	United States

=== My Everything ===
Event	Date	Country
2014 Radio Disney Music Awards	April 26, 2014	United States
White Party Palm Springs	April 27, 2014	United States
2014 iHeartRadio Music Awards	May 1, 2014	United States
Wango Tango	May 10, 2014	United States
2014 Billboard Music Awards	May 18, 2014	United States
Dancing with the Stars	May 20, 2014	United States
Kiss 108 Kiss Concert	May 31, 2014	United States
2014 MuchMusic Video Awards	June 15, 2014	Canada
iHeartRadio Ultimate Pool Party	June 27, 2014	United States
Total Ariana Live!	July 2, 2014	United States
Macy's Fourth of July Fireworks Spectacular	July 4, 2014	United States
"My Everything" Concert Stream	August 18, 2014	United States
"My Everything" iHeartRadio Concert	August 22, 2014	United States
2014 MTV Video Music Awards	August 24, 2014	United States
The Today Show	August 29, 2014	United States
Stand Up to Cancer	September 5, 2014	United States
X Factor Australia	September 8, 2014	Australia
Sunrise	September 9, 2014	Australia
2014 iHeartRadio Music Festival	September 19, 2014	United States
Saturday Night Live	September 27, 2014	United States
Alan Carr: Chatty Man	October 10, 2014	United Kingdom
Radio 1 Teen Awards	October 19, 2014	United Kingdom
We Can Survive 2014	October 24, 2014	United States
2014 CMA Awards	November 5, 2014	United States
2014 MTV European Music Awards	November 9, 2014	Scotland
2014 Bambi Awards	November 13, 2014	Germany
The Voice of Holland	November 14, 2014	Netherlands
A Very Grammy Christmas	November 18, 2014	United States
American Music Awards of 2014	November 23, 2014	United States
2014 Victoria's Secret Fashion Show	December 2, 2014	United Kingdom
KIIS-FM Jingle Ball	December 5, 2014	United States
B96 Jingle Bash	December 6, 2014	United States
KDWB-FM Jingle Ball	December 8, 2014	United States
Q102 Jingle Ball	December 10, 2014	United States
Z100 Jingle Ball	December 12, 2014	United States
Hot 99.5 Jingle Ball	December 15, 2014	United States
Michael Bublé's Christmas Special	December 17, 2014	United States
Y100 Jingle Ball	December 21, 2014	United States
Disney Parks Frozen Christmas Celebration	December 25, 2014	United States
The Tonight Show Starring Jimmy Fallon	February 1, 2015	United States
57th Grammy Awards	February 8, 2015	United States
Stevie Wonder: Songs In The Key Of Life	February 10, 2015	United States
2015 NBA All-Star Game Halftime Show	February 15, 2015	United States
Houston Livestock Show and Rodeo	March 17, 2015	United States
The Voice of Italy	May 27, 2015	Italy
Capital-FM Summertime Ball	June 6, 2015	United Kingdom
NYC Pride: Dance On The Pier	June 28, 2015	United States
Summer Sonic Festival	August 15, 2015	Japan
Summer Sonic Festival	August 16, 2015	Japan
"Ari" Fragrance Macy's Premiere	September 16, 2015	United States
Global Citizen Festival	September 26, 2015	United States
Halloween iHeartRadio Concert	October 30, 2015	United States
Dancing with the Stars	November 23, 2015	United States
Disney Parks Unforgettable Christmas Celebration	December 25, 2015	United States
New Year's Eve Special Concert	December 31, 2015	United States

=== Dangerous Woman ===
Event	Date	Country
Saturday Night Live	March 12, 2016	United States
T-Mobile Arena Opening Celebration	April 7, 2016	United States
2016 MTV Movie Awards	April 10, 2016	United States
The Tonight Show Starring Jimmy Fallon	April 25, 2016	United States
Time 100 Gala	April 25, 2016	United States
2016 Radio Disney Music Awards	April 30, 2016	United States
Delete Blood Cancer DKMS Gala	May 5, 2016	United States
Jimmy Kimmel Live!	May 12, 2016	United States
Channel 93.3 Summer Kickoff	May 13, 2016	United States
Wango Tango	May 14, 2016	United States
Vevo Presents	May 18, 2016	United States
Good Morning America	May 20, 2016	United States
2016 Billboard Music Awards	May 22, 2016	United States
The Voice	May 24, 2016	United States
Private Birthday Party Concert	May 29, 2016	Greece
HP Lounge Party	June 8, 2016	France
Capital-FM Summertime Ball	June 11, 2016	United Kingdom
Ari Fes	June 25, 2016	Japan
B96 Pepsi Summer Bash	June 26, 2016	United States
ABC Greatest Hits	August 4, 2016	United States
Billboard Hot 100 Music Festival	August 20, 2016	United States
2016 MTV Video Music Awards	August 28, 2016	United States
The Tonight Show Starring Jimmy Fallon	September 8, 2016	United States
Macy's Presents: Fashion's Front Row	September 9, 2016	United States
7/27 Tour	September 9, 2016	United States
The Ellen DeGeneres Show	September 14, 2016	United States
The Tonight Show Starring Jimmy Fallon	September 19, 2016	United States
2016 iHeartRadio Music Festival	September 24, 2016	United States
Tiffany & Co's Re-Opening	October 13, 2016	United States
We Can Survive 2016	October 22, 2016	United States
American Music Awards of 2016	November 20, 2016	United States
Z100 Jingle Ball	December 9, 2016	United States
Kiss 108 Jingle Ball	December 11, 2016	United States
The Voice	December 13, 2016	United States
103.5 KISS-FM Jingle Ball	December 14, 2016	United States
Power 96.1 Jingle Ball	December 16, 2016	United States
UCLA Taste for a Cure Gala	April 28, 2017	United States
One Love Manchester	June 4, 2017	United Kingdom
Formula 1 2017 Singapore Grand Prix	September 16, 2017	Singapore
A Concert for Charlottesville	September 24, 2017	United States
March for Our Lives	March 24, 2018	United States

=== Sweetener ===
Event	Date	Country
Coachella Valley Music and Arts Festival	April 20, 2018	United States
The Tonight Show Starring Jimmy Fallon	May 1, 2018	United States
YouTube Brandcast 2018	May 3, 2018	United States
The Tonight Show Starring Jimmy Fallon	May 14, 2018	United States
2018 Billboard Music Awards	May 20, 2018	United States
Wango Tango	June 2, 2018	United States
Songwriters Hall of Fame	June 14, 2018	United States
Amazon Prime Day 2018	July 11, 2018	United States
The Late Late Show with James Corden	August 13, 2018	United States
The Late Late Show with James Corden (Carpool Karaoke)	August 15, 2018	United States
The Tonight Show Starring Jimmy Fallon	August 16, 2018	United States
2018 MTV Video Music Awards	August 20, 2018	United States
Good Morning America	August 22, 2018	United States
Aretha Franklin's memorial service	August 31, 2018	United States
BBC Live Lounge	September 5, 2018	United Kingdom
A Very Wicked Halloween	October 29, 2018	United States
Ariana Grande at the BBC	November 1, 2018	United Kingdom

=== Thank U, Next ===
Event	Date	Country
The Ellen DeGeneres Show	November 7, 2018	United States
Billboard Women in Music	December 6, 2018	United States
The Tonight Show Starring Jimmy Fallon	December 18, 2018	United States
2019 iHeartRadio Music Awards	March 14, 2019	United States
2019 Billboard Music Awards	May 1, 2019	United States
62nd Annual Grammy Awards	January 26, 2020	United States

=== Positions ===
Event	Date	Country
Vevo Presents	June 21, 2021	United States
Vevo Presents	July 7, 2021	United States
Vevo Presents	July 14, 2021	United States
Vevo Presents	July 15, 2021	United States
Vevo Presents	July 21, 2021	United States
Vevo Presents	July 22, 2021	United States
Rift Tour	August 6, 2021	Online (Fortnite Battle Royale)
Rift Tour	August 7, 2021	Online (Fortnite Battle Royale)
Rift Tour	August 8, 2021	Online (Fortnite Battle Royale)
Adult Swim Festival	November 13, 2020	United States

=== Eternal Sunshine ===
Event	Date	Country
Saturday Night Live	March 8, 2024	United States
Met Gala	May 6, 2024	United States
The Tonight Show Starring Jimmy Fallon	June 6, 2024	United States

=== Other live performances ===
Event	Date	Country
American Music Awards of 2015	November 22, 2015	United States
The Disney Family Singalong	April 16, 2020	United States
Jason Robert Brown's Virtual Concert	April 27, 2020	Online
2020 MTV Video Music Awards	August 30, 2020	United States
Adult Swim Festival	November 13, 2020	United States
2021 iHeartRadio Music Awards	May 27, 2021	United States
Merry Christmas One and All!	December 9, 2023	United States
Wicked: One Wonderful Night	November 6, 2025	United States
