= Ariana Grande =

American singer, songwriter, and actress (born 1993)

- Grande in 2026
- Born: Ariana Grande-Butera; June 26, 1993 (age 33); Boca Raton, Florida, U.S.
- Occupations: Singer; songwriter; actress
- Years active: 2008–present
- Organization: R.E.M. Beauty
- Works: Discography; songs recorded; videography; performances
- Spouse: Dalton Gomez (m. 2021; div. 2024)
- Relatives: Frankie Grande (half-brother)
- Awards: Full list
- Musical career
- Genres: Pop; R&B
- Instruments: Vocals
- Labels: Republic; Babydoll
- Website: arianagrande.com

Ariana Grande-Butera (/ˌɑːriˈɑːnə ˈɡrɑːndeɪ bjʊˈtɛərə/ AR-ee-AH-nə GRAHN-day byuu-TAIR-ə; (Note: Grande pronounces her surname with the final syllable like the word "day". She explained in an interview for Beats 1 that the pronunciation with the final syllable like "dee" was used by her grandfather.) born June 26, 1993) is an American singer, songwriter, and actress. Known for her four-octave vocal range, which extends into the whistle register, she is an influential figure in popular music. Publications such as Rolling Stone and Billboard have deemed Grande one of the greatest artists in history, while Time included her on its list of the world's 100 most influential people in 2016 and 2019.

Grande's career began as a teenager in the Broadway musical 13 (2008) before she gained prominence as Cat Valentine in the Nickelodeon television series Victorious (2010–2013) and its spin-off Sam & Cat (2013–2014). After signing with Republic Records, she released her debut studio album, Yours Truly (2013), a retro-inspired pop and R&B record that debuted atop the Billboard 200. She incorporated elements of electronic on My Everything (2014) and Dangerous Woman (2016), which both achieved international success and spawned the hit singles "Problem", "Break Free", "Bang Bang", "One Last Time", "Into You", and "Side to Side".

Personal struggles influenced Grande's trap albums Sweetener (2018) and Thank U, Next (2019), which were followed up with the R&B-infused Positions (2020). The singles "Thank U, Next", "7 Rings", "Stuck with U", "Rain on Me", "Positions", "Save Your Tears", and "Die for You" topped the US Billboard Hot 100. After a musical hiatus, Grande explored dance on Eternal Sunshine (2024) and electronic on Petal (2026), which collectively yielded the US number-one singles "Yes, And?", "We Can't Be Friends (Wait for Your Love)", and "Hate That I Made You Love Me". She returned to acting with the political satire film Don't Look Up (2021) and portrayed Glinda in the fantasy musical film Wicked (2024), which earned her an Academy Award nomination, as well as its sequel Wicked: For Good (2025).

Grande is one of the best-selling music artists ever. She is among the highest-certified artists in the US, with over 150 million equivalent units certified by the Recording Industry Association of America (RIAA). The highest-paid female musician in 2020, her accolades include three Grammy Awards, a Brit Award, two Billboard Music Awards, three American Music Awards, forty-one Guinness World Records, and fifteen MTV Video Music Awards. Grande has amassed seven Billboard 200 number-one albums and ten Billboard Hot 100 number-one singles. Outside of music and acting, she has worked with many charitable organizations and advocates for animal rights, mental health, and gender, racial, and LGBT equality. Her business ventures include the cosmetics brand R.E.M. Beauty and a fragrance line that has earned over $1 billion in global retail sales. She has a large social media following, being the sixth-most-followed individual on Instagram.

== Early life ==
Ariana Grande-Butera was born on June 26, 1993, in Boca Raton, Florida. She is the daughter of Joan Grande, the Brooklyn-born CEO of Hose-McCann Communications, a manufacturer of marine communications equipment owned by the Grande family since 1964, and Edward Butera, a graphic design firm owner in Boca Raton. Grande is of Sicilian and Abruzzese Italian ancestry. She has an older half-brother, Frankie Grande, who is an entertainer and producer. Her family moved from New York to Florida before her birth, and her parents separated when she was eight or nine years old. Grande had a close relationship with her maternal grandmother, Marjorie Grande. At age eight, she sang "The Star-Spangled Banner" at the Florida Panthers' home game against the Chicago Blackhawks on January 16, 2002.

As a young child, Grande performed with the Fort Lauderdale Children's Theater, playing her first role as the title character in the musical Annie. She also performed in their productions of The Wizard of Oz and Beauty and the Beast. At age eight, she performed at a karaoke lounge on a cruise ship and with orchestras such as South Florida's Philharmonic, Florida Sunshine Pops, and Symphonic Orchestras. During this time, she attended the Pine Crest School and later North Broward Preparatory.

== Career ==
=== 2008–2013: Career beginnings and Nickelodeon ===
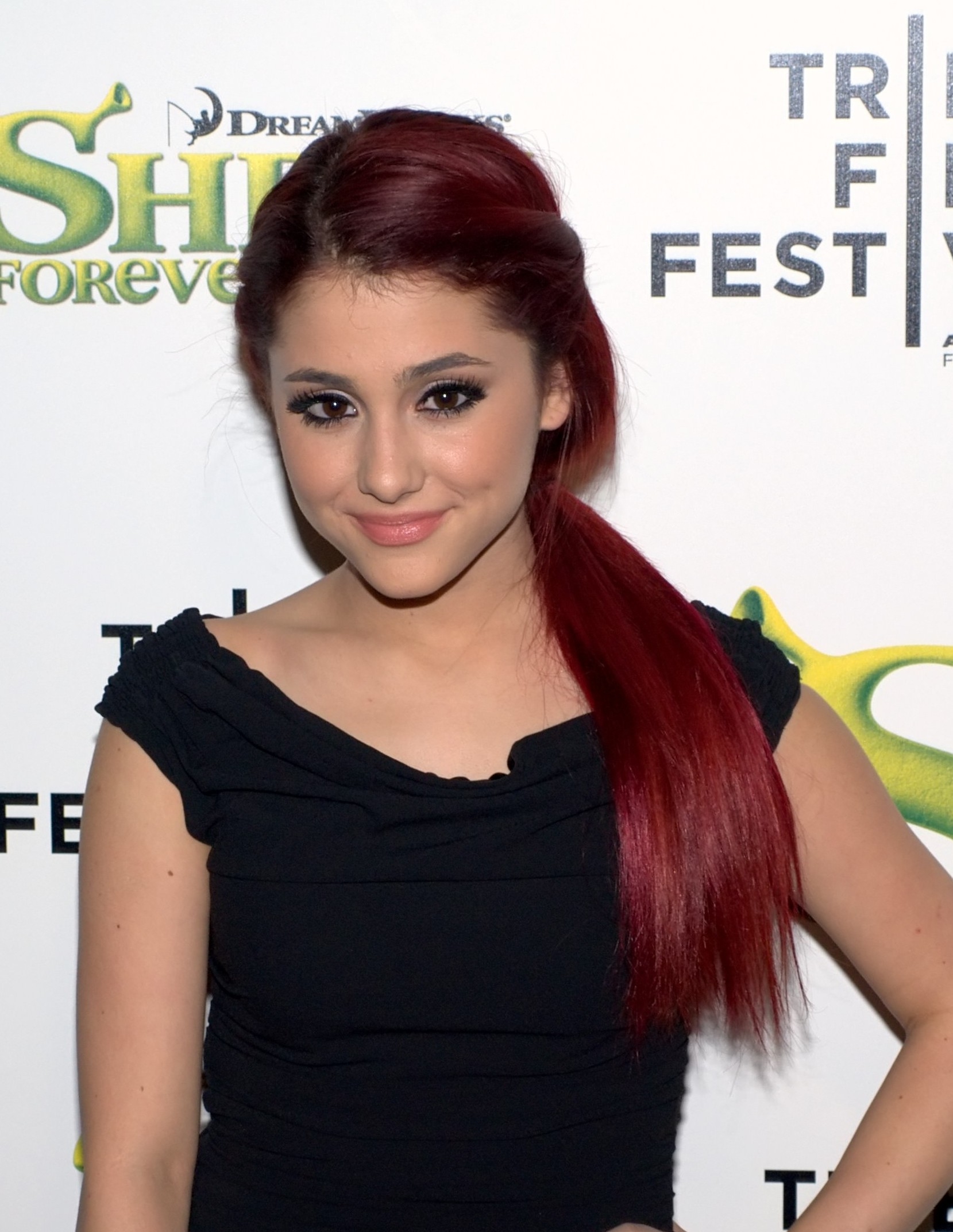
Grande at the 2010 Tribeca Film Festival

When Grande first arrived in Los Angeles, California, to meet with her managers, she expressed a desire to record an R&B album: "I was like, 'I want to make an R&B album.' They were like 'Um, that's a helluva goal! Who is going to buy a 14-year-old's R&B album?!'" In 2008, she was cast as cheerleader Charlotte in the Broadway musical 13.

Grande was cast in the Nickelodeon television show Victorious along with her 13 co-star Elizabeth Gillies in 2009. In the sitcom, set at a performing arts high school, she played the "adorably dimwitted" Cat Valentine. She had to dye her hair red every other week for the role, which damaged it. The show premiered in March 2010 to the second-largest audience for a live-action series on Nickelodeon, with 5.7 million viewers. The role helped propel Grande to teen idol status, but she was more interested in a music career, saying that acting is "fun, but music has always been first and foremost with me".

After the first season of Victorious wrapped, Grande wanted to focus on her music career and began working on her debut album in August 2010. The second season premiered in April 2011 to 6.2 million viewers, becoming the show's highest-rated episode. In May 2011, Grande appeared in Greyson Chance's video for the song "Unfriend You" from his album Hold On 'til the Night (2011), portraying his ex-girlfriend. She made her first musical appearance on the track "Give It Up" from the Victorious soundtrack in August 2011. While filming Victorious, Grande made several recordings of herself singing covers of songs by Adele, Whitney Houston, and Mariah Carey and uploaded them to YouTube. A friend of Monte Lipman, chief executive officer (CEO) of Republic Records, came across one of the videos. Impressed by her vocals, he sent the links to Lipman, who signed her to a recording contract. Grande voiced the title role in the English dub of the Spanish-language animated film Snowflake, the White Gorilla in November 2011. From 2011 to 2013, she was cast in the role of fairy Princess Diaspro in the Nickelodeon revival of Winx Club.

In December 2011, Grande released her first promotional single, (Note: Grande's 2013 single with Mac Miller, "The Way", has been described as her debut single by a variety of media outlets.) "Put Your Hearts Up", recorded for a debut studio album that was never issued. She later disowned the track for its bubblegum pop sound, saying she had no interest in recording music of that genre. The song was later certified Gold by the Recording Industry Association of America (RIAA). On a second soundtrack, Victorious 2.0, released as an extended play (EP) on June 5, 2012, she supplied vocals as part of the show's cast for the song "5 Fingaz to the Face". The third and final soundtrack, Victorious 3.0, was released on November 6, 2012, which featured a duet by Grande and Victoria Justice titled "L.A. Boyz", with an accompanying music video being released shortly after. In December 2012, Grande collaborated on the single version of "Popular Song", a duet with British singer and songwriter Mika.

After four seasons, Victorious was not renewed, with the finale airing in February 2013. Grande starred as Snow White in the pantomime-style musical theatre production A Snow White Christmas with Charlene Tilton and Neil Patrick Harris at the Pasadena Playhouse. She played Amanda Benson in Swindle, a 2013 Nickelodeon film adaptation of the children's book of the same name. Meanwhile, Nickelodeon created Sam & Cat, an iCarly and Victorious spin-off starring Jennette McCurdy and Grande. Grande and McCurdy reprised their roles as Cat Valentine and Sam Puckett on the buddy sitcom, which paired the characters as roommates who form an after-school babysitting business.

=== 2013–2015: Yours Truly and My Everything ===
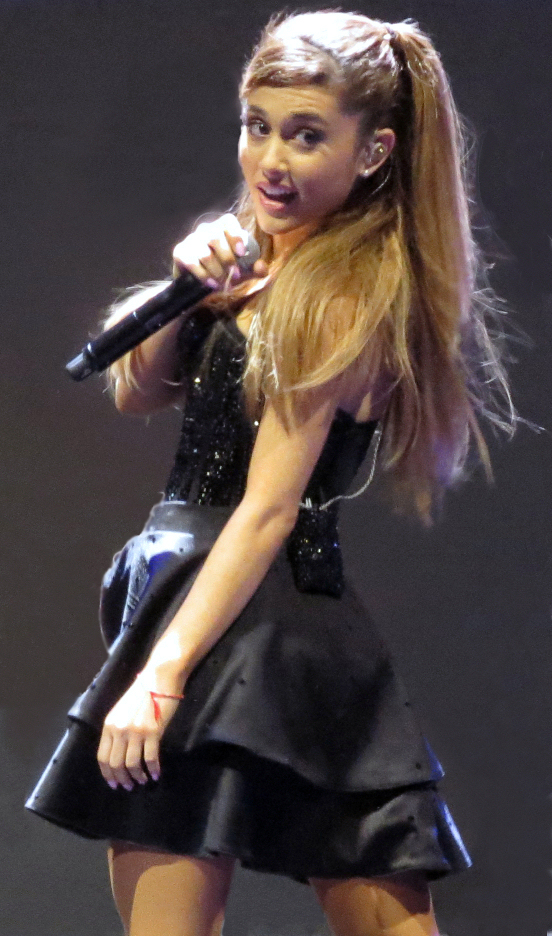
Grande in 2013

In early 2013, Grande signed with talent manager Scooter Braun and his firm SB Projects. Grande released her debut album, Yours Truly, on August 30, 2013. A pop and R&B record influenced by 1950s doo-wop, it debuted at number one on the US Billboard 200 albums chart, with 138,000 copies sold in its first week. Yours Truly also debuted in the top ten in several other countries, including Australia, the UK, Ireland, and the Netherlands. Its lead single, "The Way", featuring Pittsburgh rapper Mac Miller, debuted at number ten on the US Billboard Hot 100, eventually peaking at number nine for two weeks. Grande was later sued by Minder Music for copying the line "What we gotta do right here is go back, back in time" from the 1972 song "Troglodyte (Cave Man)" by the Jimmy Castor Bunch. The album's second single, "Baby I", was released in July. Its third single, "Right There", featuring Detroit rapper Big Sean, was released in August 2013. They respectively peaked at numbers 21 and 84 on the US Billboard Hot 100.

Grande recorded the duet "Almost Is Never Enough" with English singer Nathan Sykes of the Wanted, which was released as a promotional single in August 2013. She also joined Canadian singer Justin Bieber on his Believe Tour for three shows and kicked off her own headlining mini-tour, the Listening Sessions. At the 2013 American Music Awards, she won New Artist of the Year. She released a four-song Christmas EP—Christmas Kisses—in December and received the Breakthrough Artist of the Year award from the Music Business Association, recognizing her achievements throughout 2013. By January 2014, Grande had begun recording her second studio album with singer-songwriter Ryan Tedder and record producers Benny Blanco and Max Martin. The same month, she earned the Favorite Breakout Artist award at the People's Choice Awards 2014. In March 2014, Grande sang at the White House concert, "Women of Soul: In Performance at the White House". The following month, President Barack Obama and First Lady Michelle Obama invited Grande again to perform at the White House for the Easter Egg Roll event.

Grande released her second studio album, My Everything, on August 25, 2014; it debuted atop the US Billboard 200 with 169,000 copies and received generally positive reviews. (Note: Attributed to multiple sources:) She explored EDM, dance-pop, and electro genres on the album. (Note: Attributed to multiple sources:) Its lead single, "Problem" featuring Australian rapper Iggy Azalea, peaked at number two on the US Billboard Hot 100, and became Grande's first number-one on the UK and New Zealand singles charts. Selling 438,000 digital copies in its opening week, it achieved the highest first-week sales numbers of 2014 and made Grande the youngest woman, at 20 years old, to debut with over 400,000 downloads at the time. "Problem" became 2014's eighth-best-selling digital single globally, with over nine million copies sold, according to the International Federation of the Phonographic Industry (IFPI). The album's second single, "Break Free", featuring German musician and producer Zedd, was released on July 3 and reached number four in the United States. She performed the song as the opening of the 2014 MTV Video Music Awards and won Best Pop Video for "Problem". Grande and Nicki Minaj provided guest vocals on "Bang Bang", the lead single from Jessie J's album Sweet Talker, which peaked at number one in the UK and at number three in the US. The song was added to the deluxe version of My Everything, serving as the third single from the album. It was certified diamond by the RIAA in May 2024, for selling over 10 million units in the US; it marked the first all-female collaboration to achieve the certification. With the singles "Problem", "Break Free", and "Bang Bang", Grande became the second female artist in chart history, joining Adele, with three top-ten singles simultaneously listed on the Billboard Hot 100 as a lead artist.

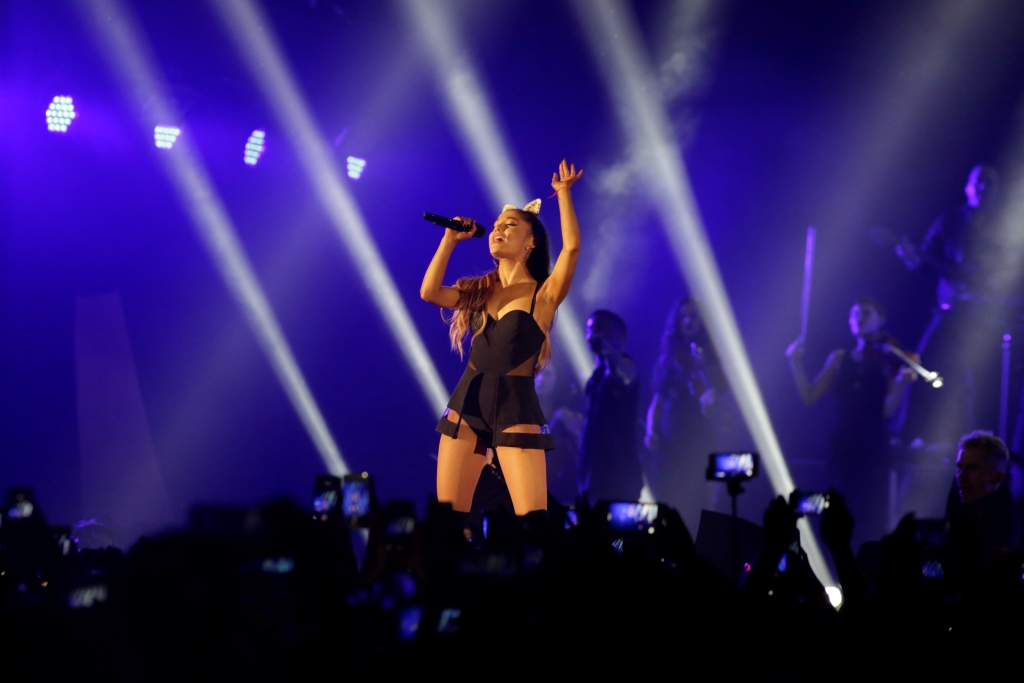
Grande performing on the Honeymoon Tour in 2015

Grande was the musical performer on Saturday Night Live, with Chris Pratt as the host on September 27, 2014. That same month, the fourth single from My Everything, "Love Me Harder", featuring Canadian recording artist the Weeknd, was released and peaked at number seven in the United States. In November 2014, Grande was featured in Major Lazer's song "All My Love" from the soundtrack album for the film The Hunger Games: Mockingjay – Part 1 (2014). Later that month, Grande released the Christmas song "Santa Tell Me" as a single from the reissue of her first Christmas EP, Christmas Kisses (2014). The track became a modern Christmas standard, significantly rising in popularity on streaming services during the holiday season every year. A decade after its release, it reached number five on the Hot 100 issue dated January 4, 2025—being the first Christmas song released in the 21st century to appear in the chart's top-five region. The following month, she appeared on Nicki Minaj's third album, The Pinkprint, with the song "Get on Your Knees". She later released the fifth and final single from My Everything, "One Last Time", which peaked at number 13 in the US.

In February 2015, Grande embarked on her first worldwide concert tour, the Honeymoon Tour, to further promote My Everything, with shows in North America, Europe, Asia, and South America. Grande was featured on Cashmere Cat's song "Adore", which was released in March 2015. In June, she signed an exclusive publishing contract with the Universal Music Publishing Group, covering her entire music catalog. Grande also filmed an episode for the Fox Broadcasting Company reality TV series Knock Knock Live (2015), but the show was canceled before her episode aired. She also guest-starred on several episodes of the Fox comedy-horror television series Scream Queens as Sonya Herfmann/Chanel #2 from September to November 2015. She recorded the duet "E Più Ti Penso" with Italian recording artist Andrea Bocelli, which was released in October 2015 as the lead single from Bocelli's album Cinema (2015), and covered the song "Zero to Hero", originally from the animated film Hercules (1997), for the compilation album We Love Disney (2015). Grande also released her second Christmas EP, Christmas & Chill, in December 2015.

=== 2015–2018: Dangerous Woman and Sweetener ===
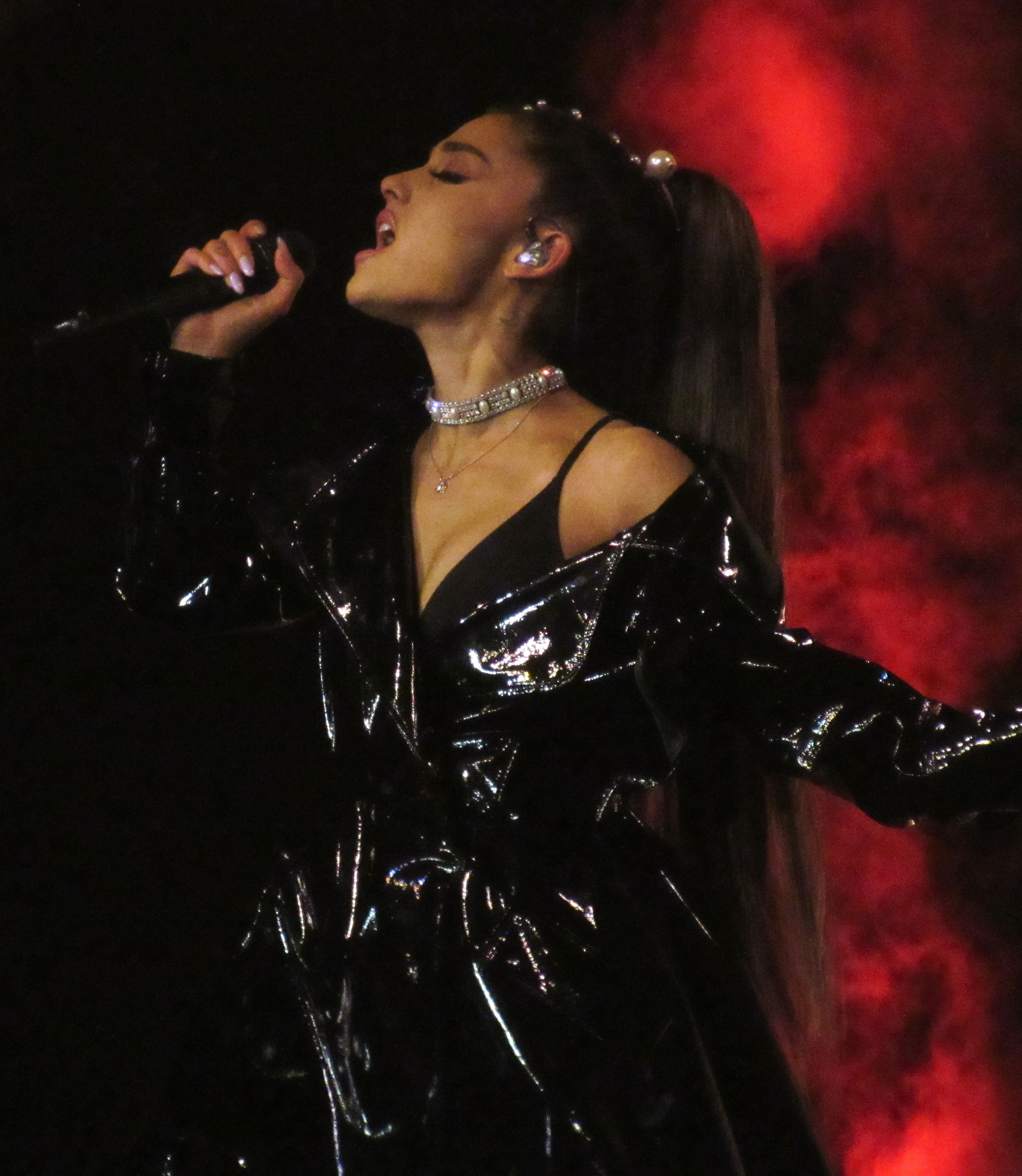
Grande performing on the Dangerous Woman Tour in 2017

Grande began recording songs for her third studio album, Dangerous Woman, originally titled Moonlight, in 2015. In October of that year, she released the single "Focus", initially intended as the lead single from the album; the song debuted at number seven on the Billboard Hot 100. The next month, Grande and Meghan Trainor featured on American singer Who Is Fancy's single "Boys Like You". She was also featured in the remix version of "Over and Over Again", a song by Nathan Sykes from his solo debut studio album, Unfinished Business, which was released in January 2016. In March 2016, Grande released "Dangerous Woman" as the lead single from the retitled album of the same name. The single debuted at number ten on the Billboard Hot 100, making her the first artist to debut the lead single from each of their first three albums in the top ten. The same month, Grande appeared as host and musical guest of Saturday Night Live, where she performed "Dangerous Woman" and debuted the promotional single "Be Alright", which charted at number 43 on the Billboard Hot 100. Grande garnered positive reviews for her appearance on the show, including praise for her impressions of various singers, some of which she had done on The Tonight Show Starring Jimmy Fallon.

Grande released Dangerous Woman on May 20, 2016, which debuted at number two on the Billboard 200. It also debuted at number two in Japan, and at number one in several other markets, including Australia, the Netherlands, Ireland, Italy, New Zealand and the UK. Mark Savage, writing for BBC News, called the album "a mature, confident record". In August, Grande released a third single from the album, "Side to Side", featuring Nicki Minaj, her eighth top-ten entry on the Hot 100, which peaked at number four on that chart. Dangerous Woman and its title track received Grammy Award nominations for Best Pop Vocal Album and Best Pop Solo Performance. Aside from music, Grande played Penny Pingleton in the NBC television broadcast Hairspray Live!, which aired in December 2016. Grande recorded the title track of the soundtrack for the 2017 live-action remake of Disney's 1991 animated film Beauty and the Beast. The recording was released as a duet with American singer John Legend in February 2017. The same month, Grande embarked on her third concert tour, the Dangerous Woman Tour, to promote the album.

On May 22, 2017, her concert at the Manchester Arena was the target of a suicide bombing. An Islamic extremist, motivated by Muslim casualties from US intervention in the Syrian Civil War, detonated a shrapnel-laden homemade bomb as people were leaving the arena. The Manchester Arena bombing, which occurred at the City Room, caused 22 deaths and injured over 1,000 more. Grande suspended the remainder of the tour and held a televised benefit concert, One Love Manchester, on June 4, helping to raise $23 million to aid the bombing's victims and affected families. The concert featured performances from Grande, as well as Liam Gallagher, Robbie Williams, Justin Bieber, Katy Perry, Miley Cyrus, and other artists. To recognize her efforts, the Manchester City Council named Grande the first honorary citizen of Manchester and, later in the year, she was reported to have declined an honorary UK damehood. The tour resumed on June 7 in Paris and ended in September 2017.

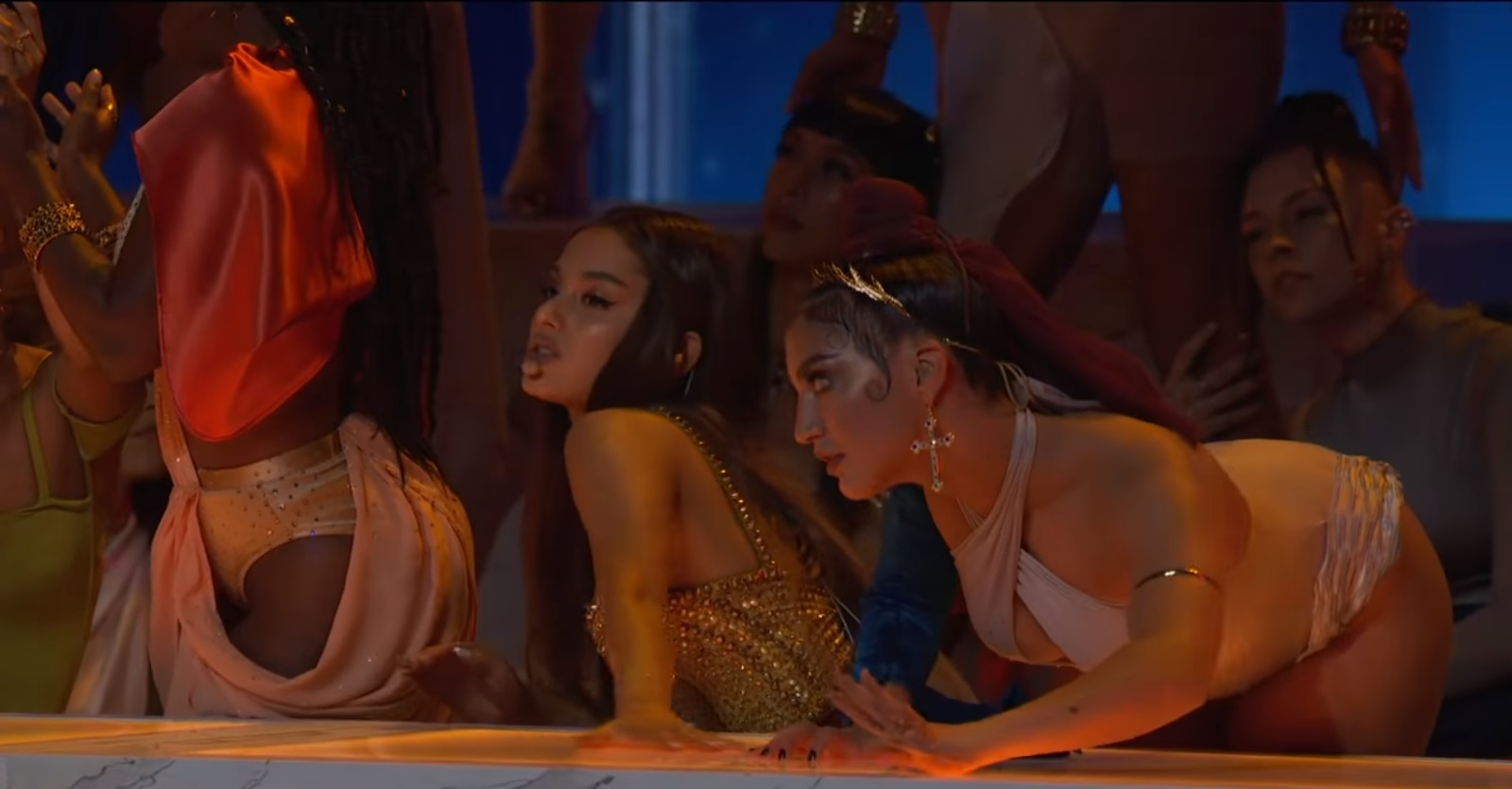
Grande performs "God Is a Woman" at the 2018 MTV Video Music Awards in New York City

In August 2017, Grande appeared in an Apple Music Carpool Karaoke episode, singing musical theatre songs with American entertainer Seth MacFarlane. In December 2017, Billboard magazine named her "Female Artist of the Year". Grande began working on songs for her fourth studio album, Sweetener, with Pharrell Williams in 2016. Grande released "No Tears Left to Cry" as the lead single from Sweetener in April 2018, with the song debuting at number three on the Billboard Hot 100, making Grande the only artist to debut the lead single of her first four albums in the top ten of the Hot 100. In June 2018, she was featured in "Bed", the second single from Nicki Minaj's fourth studio album, Queen. The same month, she was featured on Troye Sivan's single "Dance to This" from his second studio album, Bloom. Sweetener's second single, "God Is a Woman", peaked at number eight on the Hot 100 and became Grande's tenth top-ten single in the US.

Released in August 2018, Sweetener debuted at number one on the Billboard 200 and received acclaim from critics. She simultaneously charted nine songs from the album on the Hot 100, along with a collaboration, making her the fourth female artist to reach the ten-song mark. Grande gave four concerts to promote the album, billed as the Sweetener Sessions, in New York City, Chicago, Los Angeles, and London between August 20 and September 4, 2018. In October 2018, Grande participated in the NBC broadcast A Very Wicked Halloween, singing "The Wizard and I" from the musical Wicked. The following month, the BBC aired a one-hour special, Ariana Grande at the BBC, featuring interviews and performances.

=== 2018–2019: Thank U, Next ===
In November 2018, Grande released the single "Thank U, Next" and announced her fifth studio album of the same name. The song debuted at number one on the Billboard Hot 100, becoming Grande's first chart-topping single in the United States, spending seven non-consecutive weeks atop. Since then, it has been certified eight-times platinum in the United States; the song's music video broke the record for the most-watched music video on YouTube within 24 hours of release and the fastest Vevo video to reach 100 million views on YouTube, at the time. On Spotify, it became the fastest song to reach 100 million streams (11 days) and the most-streamed song by a female artist in a 24-hour period, with 9.6 million streams, before being surpassed by her own "7 Rings" (nearly 15 million streams). "Thank U, Next" was the most-streamed song by a woman globally on Apple Music in 2019.

In collaboration with YouTube, Grande released a four-part docuseries titled Ariana Grande: Dangerous Woman Diaries. It shows behind-the-scenes and concert footage from Grande's Dangerous Woman Tour, including moments from the One Love Manchester concert, and follows her professional life during the tour and the making of Sweetener. The series debuted on November 29, 2018. By the end of the year, she became the most-streamed female artist on Spotify and was named Billboard's Woman of the Year. In January 2019, Grande was announced as a headliner of the Coachella Valley Music and Arts Festival, where she became the youngest and the fourth female artist ever to headline the festival. Grande brought several guest artists to perform with her, including NSYNC, P. Diddy, Nicki Minaj, and Justin Bieber. Her set received critical acclaim.

Grande's second single from Thank U, Next, "7 Rings", was released on January 18, 2019, and debuted at number one on the Billboard Hot 100 issue dated February 2, becoming her second single in a row (and overall) to top the charts. It made Grande the third female artist with multiple number-one debuts after Mariah Carey (3) and Britney Spears (2) and the fifth artist overall after Justin Bieber and Drake. Spending eight non-consecutive weeks at the summit, it became Grande's most successful song on the chart and was certified diamond in the US. "7 Rings" became 2019's fifth-best-selling song globally and one of the best-selling digital singles worldwide. Thank U, Next was released on February 8, 2019, and debuted at number one on the Billboard 200 while receiving acclaim from critics. The album garnered Grande's largest sales week of all time in the United States (360,000 album-equivalent units). Her fourth number-one album, and second in less than six months, it marked the shortest gap between number-one albums for a woman at the time. Thank U, Next broke records for the largest streaming week for a pop album and for a female album in the US, with 307 million on-demand streams. At the time, it was the only non-hip hop title among the twenty largest US album streaming weeks, at number eight. The album also achieved the largest streaming week by a female artist in Canada and the United Kingdom. In June 2020, Thank U, Next was certified double platinum by the RIAA.

Grande became the first solo artist to occupy the top three spots on the Billboard Hot 100 with "7 Rings" at number one, "Break Up with Your Girlfriend, I'm Bored" debuting at number two, and "Thank U, Next" rising to number three, and the overall second artist to do so since 1964, when the Beatles occupied the top five spots. In the United Kingdom, Grande became the second female solo artist to simultaneously hold the top two spots and the first musical artist to replace herself at number one twice consecutively. With eleven Thank U, Next tracks appearing within the top 40 region on the Hot 100, Grande broke the record for the most simultaneous top 40 entries by a female artist.

In February 2019, it was reported Grande would not attend the 61st Annual Grammy Awards after she had a disagreement with producers over a potential performance at the ceremony. Grande ended up earning her first Grammy, for Best Pop Vocal Album (Sweetener). The same month, Grande won a Brit Award for International Female Solo Artist. She also embarked on her third headlining tour, the Sweetener World Tour, to promote both Sweetener and Thank U, Next, which began on March 18 and concluded on December 22, 2019. Spanning 97 shows through North America and Europe, it grossed US$146.6 million with over 1.3 million tickets sold, marking Grande's highest-grossing and biggest tour to date. A live album of the tour's setlist, titled K Bye for Now (SWT Live), was released on December 23. Grande was nominated for nine awards at the 2019 Billboard Music Awards, including Top Artist; she won two for Billboard Chart Achievement and Top Female Artist on May 1, 2019. Grande performed at the event via a pre-recorded performance from her Sweetener World Tour.

Grande co-executive produced the soundtrack to the film Charlie's Angels, which was released on November 1, 2019; she co-wrote and performed various songs for the record. The soundtrack was met with lukewarm reception. A collaboration with Miley Cyrus and Lana Del Rey, titled "Don't Call Me Angel", was released as the lead single on September 13. Pitchfork wrote that the pop stars "meet at a lower creative common denominator than they've enjoyed lately". The track was nominated for Best Original Song at the 24th Satellite Awards. In August 2019, she released the single "Boyfriend" with pop duo Social House; it debuted at number eight on the Hot 100, and became the first song by a woman to top the Rolling Stone Top 100 chart. Grande co-wrote singer Normani's debut solo single, "Motivation", which was released on August 16, 2019. Grande won three awards at the 2019 MTV Video Music Awards, including the Artist of the Year award. She was nominated for 12 awards in total, including Video of the Year for "Thank U, Next".

Grande was featured on the remix of American singer and rapper Lizzo's song "Good as Hell", which was released on October 25, 2019. By the end of the year, NME named Grande one of the defining music artists of the 2010s, and she became the most-streamed female artist of the decade on Spotify. Also, Forbes ranked her among the highest-paid celebrities in 2019, placing at number 62 on the list, while Billboard ranked her as 2019's highest-paid solo musician. According to the IFPI, Thank U, Next was the eighth-best-selling album of 2019 globally, having sold over one million copies worldwide. It also ranked as the second-best-performing album on the Billboard 200 year-end chart of 2019.

=== 2020–2023: Positions ===
In January 2020, Grande received multiple nominations at the 2020 iHeartRadio Music Awards, including Female Artist of the Year. At the 62nd Annual Grammy Awards, Grande performed a medley of "Imagine", "My Favorite Things", "7 Rings", and "Thank U, Next". Various publications ranked her performance among the ceremony's best. (Note: Attributed to multiple sources:) Grande received the third-most nominations (5), including her first nods for Album of the Year (Thank U, Next) and Record of the Year ("7 Rings"). She was named by Billboard and The Hollywood Reporter as one of the biggest snubs of the ceremony. Grande and Justin Bieber released a collaboration song titled "Stuck with U" on May 8, 2020; net proceeds from the sales of the song were donated to the First Responders Children's Foundation in light of the COVID-19 pandemic. The song debuted at number one on the Billboard Hot 100, becoming Grande's third chart-topping single. She and Bieber tied Mariah Carey and Drake for the most number-one debuts on the Hot 100; Grande became the first artist to debut her first three number-ones at the top, following "Thank U, Next" and "7 Rings". Grande appeared on Lady Gaga's "Rain on Me", the second single from Gaga's sixth studio album, Chromatica. The song also debuted at number one on the Billboard Hot 100, becoming Grande's fourth number-one single and helping her break the record for the most number-one debuts on that chart. It won the Best Pop Duo/Group Performance category at the 63rd Annual Grammy Awards. In 2020, Grande became the highest-earning woman in music on Forbes's 2020 Celebrity 100 list, placing 17th overall with $72 million. At the 2020 MTV Video Music Awards, she was nominated for nine awards for both "Stuck with U" (with Bieber) and "Rain on Me" (with Gaga). For the latter, Grande received her third consecutive nomination for Video of the Year. She won four awards, including Song of the Year for "Rain on Me".

Grande's sixth studio album, Positions, was released on October 30, 2020. A trap-infused R&B and pop record centered around themes of sexual intimacy and romantic devotion, it was met with generally favorable reviews from critics, who praised Grande's vocal performance. It debuted at number one on the Billboard 200 with first-week sales of 174,000 units, becoming Grande's fifth number-one album. Her third chart-topping album in two years and three months, it marked the fastest accumulation of three number-one albums by a woman at that time. Following its vinyl LPs release in April 2021, Positions achieved the largest vinyl sales week (32,000) by a female artist since MRC Data's inauguration in 1991, at that time. Elsewhere, the album reached number one in various countries including Argentina, Canada, Ireland, New Zealand, and the United Kingdom. The eponymous lead single was released on October 23. It debuted atop the Billboard Hot 100, becoming Grande's fifth chart-topping single and breaking numerous records. Grande became the first artist to have five number-one debuts on the Hot 100 and the first to debut their first five number-ones at the top. "Positions" became her third US number-one single in 2020 following "Stuck with U" and "Rain on Me", making Grande the first artist since Drake in 2018 to have three number-one singles in a single calendar year and the first female artist to do so since Rihanna and Katy Perry in 2010. She also achieved the feat for the fastest accumulation of three Hot 100 chart-topping debuts (five months and two weeks). "Positions" topped the Pop Airplay chart for seven weeks, surpassing "7 Rings" (six weeks) as Grande's longest-running number-one on the chart. Debuting at the summit of Billboard's Global 200 and Global Excl. US charts, it was the first song to simultaneously debut atop both Billboard Global charts; Grande became the first US-born artist to top the Global Excl. US survey. "Positions" also debuted atop the UK singles chart, extending Grande's record as the female act with the most number-one single debuts (seven). Spending six consecutive weeks atop the chart, it tied Grande's own "Thank U, Next" as her longest-running number-one song in the UK. Elsewhere, the single topped the charts in multiple countries, including Australia, Canada, Ireland, and New Zealand.

Alongside the release of Positions, the track "34+35" served as the second single off the album. Debuting at number eight, it became Grande's 18th top-ten single. Grande released a "34+35" remix featuring American rappers Doja Cat and Megan Thee Stallion on January 15, 2021. The remix helped the song reach a new peak at number two, the highest-charting song credited to three or more female soloists on the Hot 100 since Christina Aguilera, Mýa, Pink, and Lil' Kim's "Lady Marmalade" in 2001. The remix was one of five bonus tracks included on the deluxe edition of Positions, released on February 19, 2021. On the Pop Airplay chart issue dated February 13, "34+35" replaced Grande's own "Positions" at number one, making her the first artist to replace herself at the summit as the only act credited on both tracks. On the following chart issue, Grande occupied the top two of the chart with "34+35" and "Positions", becoming the first artist to simultaneously occupy the top two with two solo tracks. "34+35" remained at number one for three consecutive weeks; it also topped the Rhythmic airplay chart, marking Grande's third leader. In March, the song "POV" was sent to radio as the album's third single. The song reached number 27 on the Hot 100 and the top ten on mainstream radio, making Grande the first artist to have three concurrent songs in the top ten on Pop Airplay; it later peaked at number three. Positions ranked at number eight on the 2021 year-end Billboard 200 chart. On November 13, 2020, Grande made a surprise appearance on the Adult Swim Festival, performing music artist Thundercat's song "Them Changes" alongside him, which Grande had previously covered. Grande and Jennifer Hudson also featured on a remix of Mariah Carey's 2010 Christmas song "Oh Santa!". The song was released on December 4, 2020, as part of Mariah Carey's Magical Christmas Special. Grande released the concert film for her Sweetener World Tour, Excuse Me, I Love You, on December 21, 2020, exclusively on Netflix.

In April 2021, Grande was featured on a remix of the Weeknd's "Save Your Tears". The remix reached number one on the Billboard Hot 100 and Canadian Hot 100, becoming both artists' sixth number-one single on both charts. It also topped the Billboard Global 200, marking Grande's second number-one single on the chart; it made her the first woman to earn multiple leaders on the chart. She joined Paul McCartney as the only artists to earn three number-one duets on the Hot 100. With 69 weeks, the remix is among the longest-charting songs on the Hot 100 and Grande's longest-charting song in the United States. It ranked as the second best-performing song of the year on the Billboard year-end Hot 100, Global 200, and Global Excl. US charts of 2021. Grande and the Weeknd performed "Save Your Tears" together at the 2021 iHeartRadio Music Awards. In June 2021, Grande featured on the song "I Don't Do Drugs" from Doja Cat's third studio album, Planet Her. Her contribution as a songwriter and featured artist on the song earned Grande a nomination for Album of the Year at the 64th Annual Grammy Awards. She was also nominated for Best Pop Solo Performance ("Positions") and Best Pop Vocal Album (Positions), tying Kelly Clarkson for the most nominations in the latter category (five). In September, she joined as a coach of the twenty-first season of The Voice; Grande became the highest-paid coach in the show's history, earning a reported $25 million for that season. The season concluded in December 2021; Grande did not return for the next season. That month, she appeared in Adam McKay's film Don't Look Up, alongside Leonardo DiCaprio, Jennifer Lawrence, and Meryl Streep. With streams of more than 152 million hours in a week, it broke the record for the biggest viewership week in Netflix history at the time. To promote the film, Grande released the song "Just Look Up", in collaboration with rapper Kid Cudi, on December 3, 2021. At the 27th Critics' Choice Awards, Grande received nominations for Best Song and Best Acting Ensemble as part of the cast. She also received a nomination at the 28th Screen Actors Guild Awards for Outstanding Performance by a Cast in a Motion Picture. Grande was named the most-played artist on iHeartRadio's stations in 2021, reaching 2.6 billion in audience.

On February 24, 2023, following months-long renewed interest in and virality of the Weeknd's 2016 song "Die for You", a remix of the song with Grande was released. It marked their fourth collaboration. The remix topped the Billboard Hot 100 chart, becoming both artists' seventh number-one hit. Grande became the artist with the most number-one duets (four) on the chart, surpassing McCartney. According to the IFPI, it was the fourth best-selling song of 2023 globally. On August 25, 2023, Grande released a reissue of her debut studio album, Yours Truly (Tenth Anniversary Edition). On December 9, 2023, Grande and Jennifer Hudson made a surprise appearance onstage to sing the "Oh Santa!" remix at Mariah Carey's show at Madison Square Garden, on her Merry Christmas One and All! tour.

=== 2024–present: Eternal Sunshine, Wicked, and Petal ===
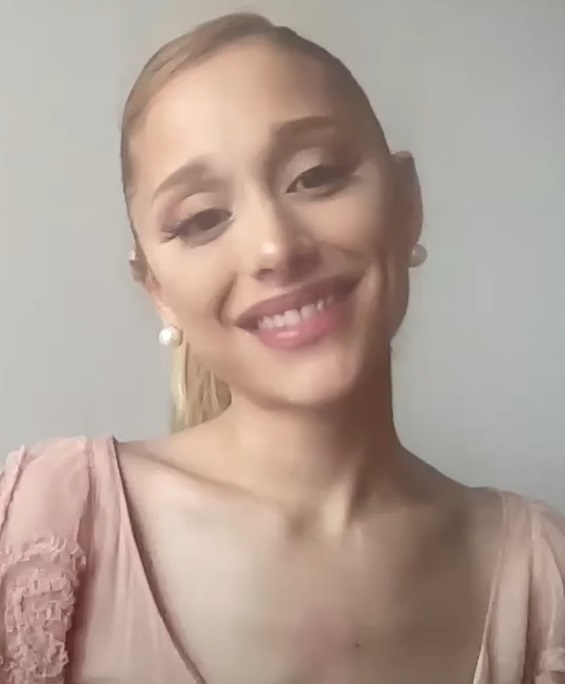
Grande in 2024

Grande's seventh studio album, titled Eternal Sunshine, was released on March 8, 2024. It was preceded by its lead single, "Yes, And?", released on January 12. The song debuted at number one on the Billboard Hot 100, topped the Billboard Global 200 and Global Excl. US charts for two weeks, and was followed by a remix featuring Mariah Carey on February 16. The second single, "We Can't Be Friends (Wait for Your Love)", was released in tandem with the album. Grande's first album in over three years, Eternal Sunshine marked her first major foray into dance and house music. Met with universal acclaim, critics dubbed it one of her most mature and sophisticated records yet. Both the album and its second single debuted atop the Billboard 200 and the Hot 100, respectively, achieving Grande's third-largest sales week (227,000 units) and making her the woman with the most Hot 100 number-one debuts (7). Elsewhere, the album debuted at number one in thirteen countries, including Australia, Canada, and the UK. With Eternal Sunshine and Thank U, Next, Grande became the first woman to have two albums produce multiple number-one single debuts in the US. It also marked her first instance of reaching the top of both the Billboard Hot 100 Songwriters and Hot 100 Producers charts. Topping the Pop Airplay chart for two weeks, "We Can't Be Friends (Wait for Your Love)" marked Grande's tenth number-one. On May 6, 2024, Grande performed at the Met Gala and was joined on stage by Cynthia Erivo to close out her performance. "The Boy Is Mine", which reached the top 20 on the Hot 100, was issued as the third Eternal Sunshine single in June; a remix featuring Brandy and Monica followed later that month. On August 22, 2024, Grande released a reissue of her second studio album, My Everything, for its tenth anniversary. Two extended editions of Eternal Sunshine containing the pre-released single remixes, guest vocals from Troye Sivan, and live versions of several tracks were surprise-released in March and October 2024. Grande appeared as the musical guest on Saturday Night Live on March 9, 2024, to promote Eternal Sunshine. She featured on the remix of "Sympathy Is a Knife" on Charli XCX's remix album Brat and It's Completely Different but Also Still Brat, released on October 11, 2024. On the Las Culturistas podcast, Grande acknowledged that she would likely scale back her pop music output compared to earlier in her career, shifting her focus more towards acting. Eternal Sunshine was ranked as 2024's thirteenth-best-selling and ninth-most-streamed album globally by the IFPI.

At the 67th Annual Grammy Awards, Grande was nominated for Best Pop Vocal Album (Eternal Sunshine), Best Pop Duo/Group Performance ("The Boy Is Mine" remix), and Best Dance Pop Recording ("Yes, And?"). Eternal Sunshine Deluxe: Brighter Days Ahead, a reissue of Eternal Sunshine, was released on March 28, 2025. Grande starred as the protagonist Peaches in the accompanying short film Brighter Days Ahead, which she directed and wrote with Christian Breslauer; it was released on the same day. Her directorial debut, the short film won the Video of the Year award at the 2025 MTV Video Music Awards. With the release of the reissue, Eternal Sunshine became Grande's longest-running number-one album in the US (three weeks). Aided by Brighter Days Ahead, the album returned to the top of the charts in Australia, Canada, Ireland, and New Zealand, over a year after its release. The bonus track "Twilight Zone" was released as the reissue's lead single in April 2025, reaching the top ten on the Billboard Global 200 and the UK singles chart. Later that month, Grande featured on Jeff Goldblum and the Mildred Snitzer Orchestra's jazz album Still Blooming for a rendition of the song "I Don't Know Why (I Just Do)". She and Mariah Carey joined Barbra Streisand on "One Heart, One Voice" for Streisand's album The Secret of Life: Partners, Volume Two, released on June 27, 2025. While describing the three as "the holy trinity of glorious sound", Melissa Ruggieri of USA Today called the track an "otherwise generic ballad [that] showcases a trio steeped in restraint".

Grande starred as Galinda Upland alongside Cynthia Erivo as Elphaba Thropp in the two-part film adaptation of the fantasy musical Wicked, directed by Jon M. Chu. She was cast in November 2021 after auditioning five times for the role. She was credited with her birth name, Ariana Grande-Butera, which was her name when she first saw the stage musical at age ten. Grande reported that she began taking acting and singing lessons months before she auditioned for the role of Glinda because she wanted to be cast "so badly". The first part, Wicked, was theatrically released in November 2024, followed by the second part, Wicked: For Good, in November 2025. Critically acclaimed, Wicked was regarded among the best musical films of the 21st century and declared a pop culture phenomenon by various media. For Good was met with lukewarm reviews and less enthusiasm than its predecessor. Both parts were listed among the top ten films of 2024 and 2025 by the American Film Institute. The two parts grossed $759 million and $540 million worldwide, becoming the highest-grossing and third-highest-grossing musical adaptation films of all time, respectively. Grande's performance and comedic timing received praise from critics; she was nominated for supporting actress categories at the 97th Academy Awards, the 82nd and 83rd Golden Globes, the 30th and 31st Critics' Choice Awards, the 31st and 32nd Actor Awards, and the 78th British Academy Film Awards.

The films' soundtracks were co-billed to Grande, who performed several songs from the musical and an original track titled "The Girl in the Bubble", written by Stephen Schwartz for the Wicked: For Good soundtrack. Both albums received positive reviews and debuted at number two on the Billboard 200 with 139,000 and 122,000 units, tying for the highest debut for a soundtrack to a stage-to-film adaptation. Grande and her co-star Erivo's rendition of "Defying Gravity" won Best Pop Duo/Group Performance at the 68th Annual Grammy Awards. To promote the Wicked films, Grande hosted Saturday Night Live on October 12, 2024, and December 20, 2025. Her 2024 episode drew the show's highest ratings since May 2021, at the time, and became its most-watched episode on Peacock and across social media; the 2025 episode was season 51's highest-rated and SNL's most-watched holiday episode since 2020. She and Erivo opened the 97th Academy Awards with a medley of "Over the Rainbow", "Home", and "Defying Gravity". It was reported in October 2025 that Grande was set to appear in the thirteenth season of the horror anthology series American Horror Story; her involvement was later canceled due to scheduling conflicts. In November 2025, Grande appeared in the special Wicked: One Wonderful Night, performing music from the Wicked films alongside the cast; a live album of the special was released in tandem with the broadcast. For her and Erivo's role as principal performers and co-hosts in the special, they were nominated alongside the producers for Outstanding Variety Special (Pre-Recorded) at the 78th Primetime Creative Arts Emmy Awards.

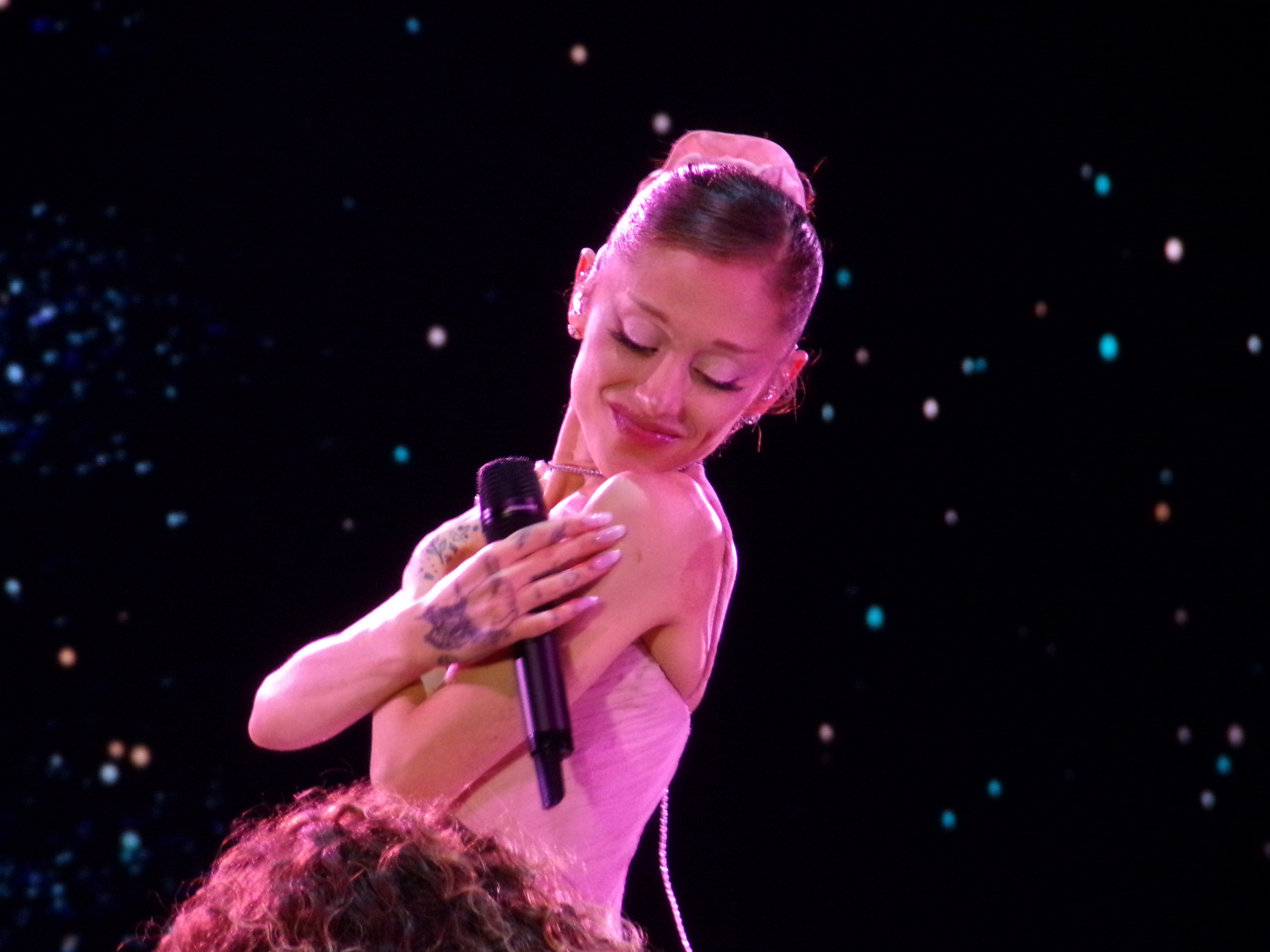
Grande at the Eternal Sunshine Tour in 2026

In May 2026, Grande released a special edition of her album Dangerous Woman for its tenth anniversary, containing a new track, "Knew Better Part Two". She then headlined the Eternal Sunshine Tour, her first concert tour since 2019, spanning 41 arena shows across North America and England, between June and September 2026. The tour was met with critical acclaim for its production, storytelling, and Grande's vocals. It grossed $107.9 million and sold over 638,000 tickets, becoming her second-highest-grossing tour. Grande's eighth studio album, Petal, was released on July 31, 2026, and is her first album under the imprint Babydoll Music, which she founded. All her future releases will be owned by Babydoll and licensed to Republic Records. Revolving around themes of romance, self-worth, fame, and public scrutiny, it delves into atmospheric production and an electronic-R&B soundscape. It received generally favorable reviews from critics. Petal debuted atop the Billboard 200 with 295,000 units, marking Grande's seventh number-one album and the second-largest sales week of her career. With 168,000 pure sales (comprising 96,000 vinyl sales), it was her second-largest pure sales debut and largest week in vinyl sales. It topped the charts in nineteen other countries, becoming her sixth number-one in Australia and the UK and her first number-one in France and Germany. The album was preceded by the lead single, "Hate That I Made You Love Me", on May 29; debuting atop the Billboard Hot 100 and UK singles chart, it marked Grande's tenth US and eighth UK number-one single, extending her record for the most number-one debuts as a woman in the UK. It also became her eleventh number-one on the US Pop Airplay chart, her first number-one on the Adult Pop Airplay chart, and topped the Billboard Global 200 and Global Excl. US charts for three and two weeks, her fourth and fifth chart-toppers on each tally. Petal's title track accompanied its release as the second single and reached the top three and top five on the Global 200 and Hot 100 charts. All twelve tracks from the album charted within the top 40 of the Hot 100; Grande occupied five of the top-ten spots on the Global 200.

She was set to star in the 2027 Barbican Centre production of the stage musical Sunday in the Park with George opposite her Wicked co-star Jonathan Bailey; however, her involvement was canceled in August 2026, which a representative described as part of a plan to "[take] a step back from visibility" following the Eternal Sunshine Tour. Grande's upcoming film projects include Focker-in-Law (2026) and an animated film adaptation of Dr. Seuss's 1990 book Oh, the Places You'll Go! (2028).

== Artistry ==
=== Influences ===
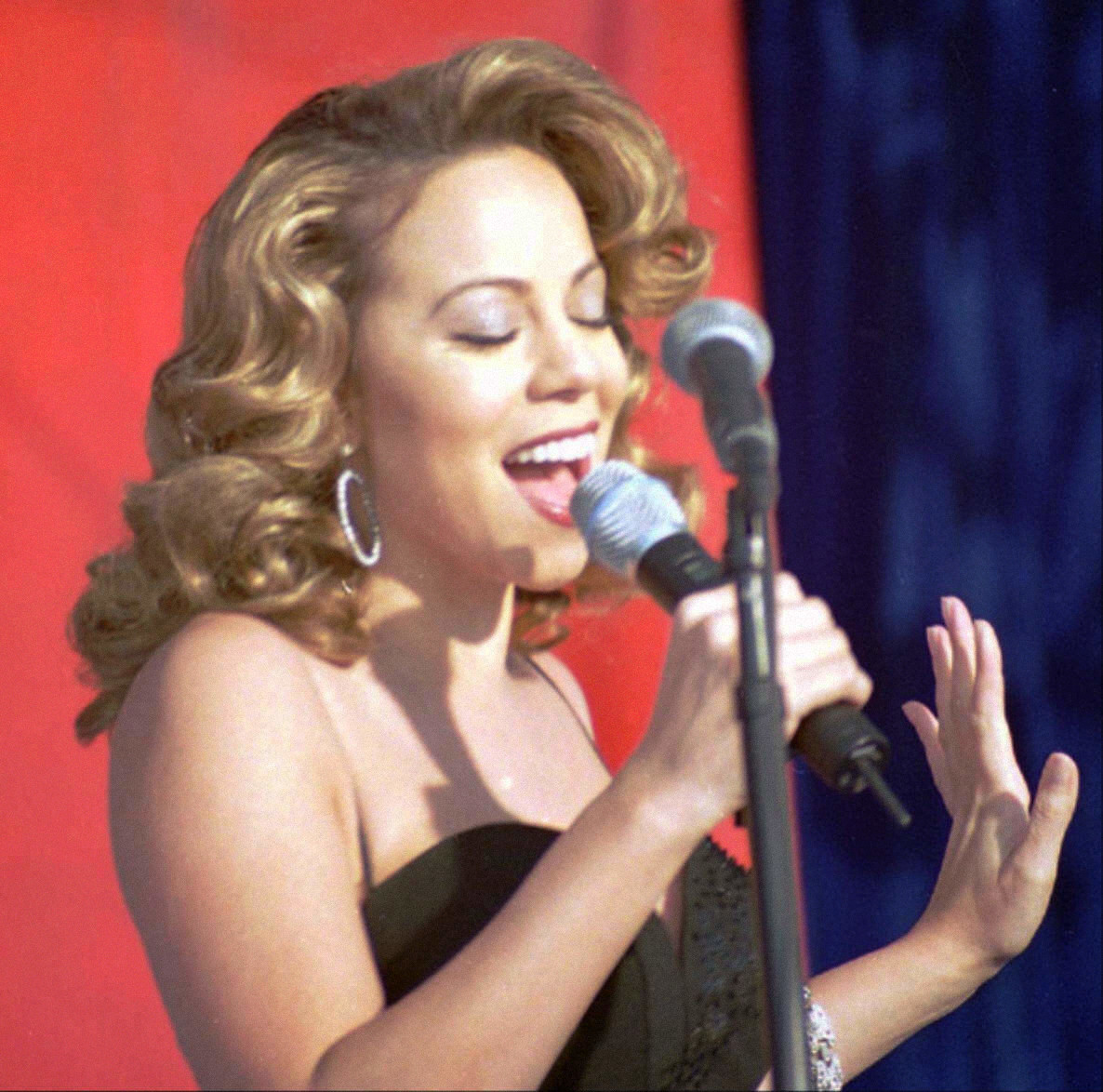
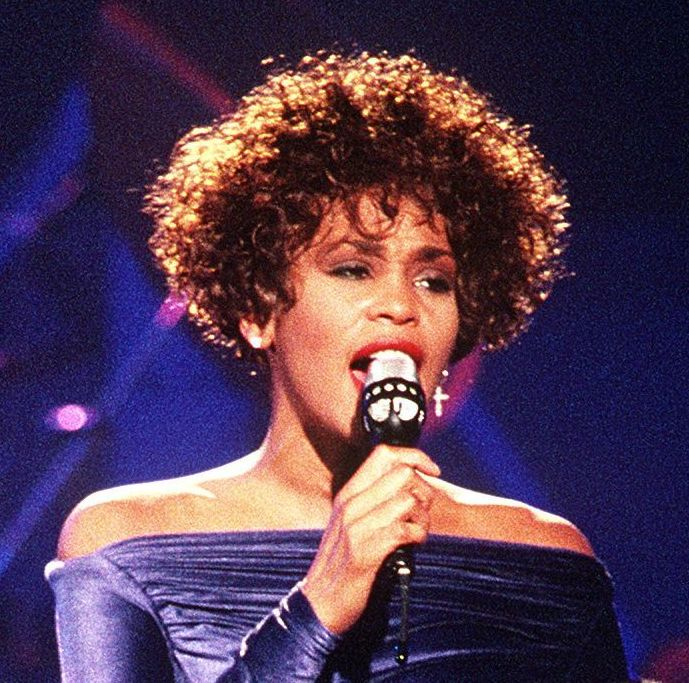
Grande credits Mariah Carey (left) and Whitney Houston (right) as her major vocal influences.

Grande grew up listening mainly to urban pop and 1990s music. She credited Gloria Estefan with inspiring her to pursue a music career after Estefan saw and complimented Grande's performance on a cruise ship when she was eight years old. Mariah Carey and Whitney Houston are her primary vocal influences: "I love Mariah Carey. She is literally my favorite human being on the planet. And of course Whitney [Houston] as well. As far as vocal influences go, Whitney and Mariah pretty much cover it." Grande was also influenced vocally by Destiny's Child, Celine Dion, Christina Aguilera, and Madonna. She reflected on her childhood by posting videos of herself singing songs from Dion's 1997 album Let's Talk About Love on her social media. Grande credits Madonna with "pav[ing] the way for me and also every other female artist" and admitted to being "obsessed with her entire discography".

Musically, Grande admires India Arie because her "music makes me feel like everything is going to be okay", loves Brandy Norwood's songs because "her riffs are incredibly on point", and praised Imogen Heap's "intricate" song structure. She named Heap in particular as her favorite musician, songwriter, and producer of all time. Grande also cited Judy Garland as a childhood influence, admiring her ability to tell "a story when she sings". Ahead of the release of her debut album, Grande said that its sound was inspired by Carey, Fergie, Heap, and Houston. Music producer and collaborator Savan Kotecha stated that he and Grande were influenced by Lauryn Hill when creating her fourth album, Sweetener, and its lead single, "No Tears Left to Cry". Kotecha told Variety, "[W]e were listening to Lauryn Hill about chord changes and why we stick to four chords all the time."

Grande expressed admiration for rappers' unconventional music release strategy. She told Billboard, "My dream has always been to be—obviously not a rapper, but, like, to put out music in the way that a rapper does. I feel like there are certain standards that pop women are held to that men aren't ... It's just like, 'Bruh, I just want to ... drop [music] the way these boys do." It inspired her to release "Thank U, Next" without any prior announcement, which The Ringer called "more of a Drake move than an Ariana Grande move".

=== Musical style ===
Grande's music is generally pop and R&B with elements of EDM, hip hop, and trap, the latter first appearing prominently on her Christmas & Chill extended play. While consistently maintaining pop and R&B tones, she has increasingly incorporated trap into her music as her career has progressed, thanks to her work with record producer Tommy Brown. She collaborated with Brown on her first six albums and has stated, "One of the things I love most about working with Tommy is that none of the beats he plays me ever sound the same." Grande learned how to sound engineer and produce her own vocals because she "love[s] being hands on" with every project, revealing that rapper Mac Miller first taught her how to use the digital audio workstation Pro Tools. Collaborator Justin Tranter remarked that he felt inspired seeing how involved Grande is in creating her music "from the writing to the vision to the storytelling and to even engineering and comping her own vocals". She has co-written songs addressing a wide variety of themes, such as love, sex, wealth, breakups, independence, empowerment, self-love, and moving on from the past.

Grande's debut album, Yours Truly, was complimented for recreating the R&B "vibe and feel of the [19]90s" with the help of songwriter and producer Babyface. Her follow-up record, My Everything, explored EDM and electropop genres. Grande expanded the pop and R&B sound on her third album, Dangerous Woman, which was praised by the Los Angeles Times for integrating elements of different styles, such as reggae-pop ("Side to Side"), dance-pop ("Be Alright"), and guitar-trap fusion ("Sometimes"). Trap-pop was more heavily featured on her fourth and fifth studio albums, Sweetener and Thank U, Next. Elias Leight of Rolling Stone opined that Grande "set her sights on conquering trap, savage basslines and jittery swarms of drum programming" and "embrace[d] the sound of hard-bitten Southern hip-hop" on Sweetener, exploring funk music with themes of love and prosperity. Craig Jenkins of Vulture noted that she embraced trap and hip hop with undertones of R&B on Thank U, Next, with lyrics about breakups, empowerment, and self-love. Her sixth album, Positions, further emphasized the R&B and trap-pop sound of its two predecessors, with lyrics discussing sex and romance.

=== Voice ===
Grande has been described as a soprano, possessing a four-octave vocal range and a whistle register. With the release of Yours Truly, critics compared Grande's wide vocal range and music to those of Mariah Carey. Julianne Escobedo Shepherd of Billboard wrote that Carey's and Grande's ranges are "not where the similarities end. ... Grande is subverting it with cute, comfortable, and on-trend dresses with a feminine slant", continuing that they both have "the talent to let their vocals do the talking".

Mark Savage of BBC News named Grande "one of pop's most intriguing and gifted singers" and complimented her "unrivalled vocal control". In The New York Times, Jon Pareles noted that Grande's voice "can be silky, breathy or cutting, swooping through long melismas or jabbing out short R&B phrases; it's always supple and airborne, never forced." Composer and playwright Jason Robert Brown wrote in a 2016 Time magazine article, "[N]o matter how much you are underestimated ... you are going to open your mouth and that unbelievable sound is going to come out. That [...] instrument [...] allows you to shut down every objection and every obstacle."

Grande's enunciation has drawn some criticism, particularly on her earlier recordings. Grande herself has acknowledged this on multiple occasions, admitting in 2015 that pronunciation was something she hoped to improve. However, several critics noted a marked improvement on Eternal Sunshine, with some attributing the clearer diction to her extensive vocal training for Wicked.

== Public image ==
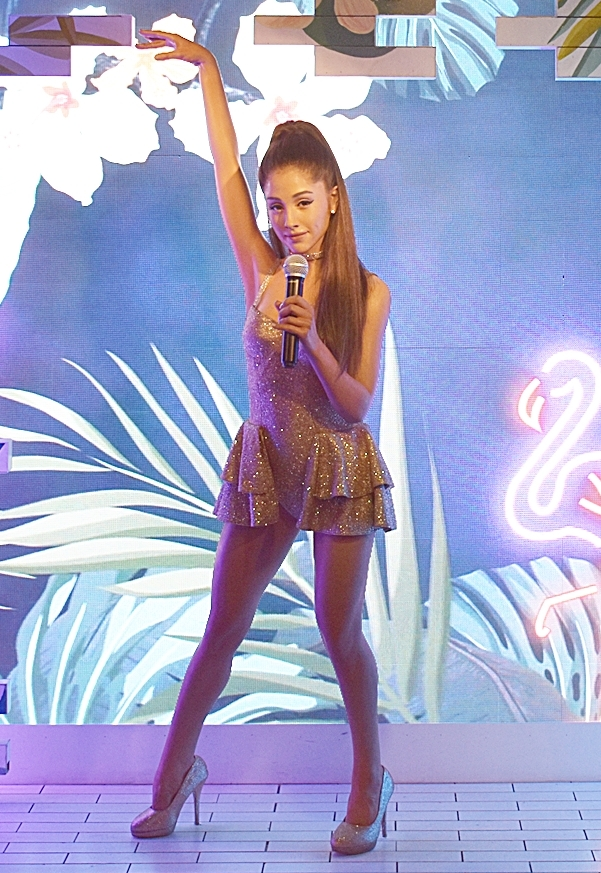
Waxwork of Grande at Madame Tussauds, Bangkok

Grande cited Audrey Hepburn as a major style influence in her early career; however, she later found emulating Hepburn's style "a little boring". She also drew inspiration from actresses of the 1950s and 1960s, such as Ann-Margret, Nancy Sinatra, and Marilyn Monroe. Grande's modest look early in her career was described as "age appropriate" in comparison to contemporary artists who grew up in the public eye. Jim Farber of the New York Daily News wrote in 2014 that Grande received less attention "for how little she wears or how graphically she moves than for how she sings". That year, she abandoned her earlier style in favor of short skirts and crop tops with knee-high boots in live performances and red carpet events. She also began regularly wearing cat and bunny ears; following the 2017 Manchester Arena bombing, fans of Grande combined bunny ears associated with her with awareness ribbons as a tribute symbol. She subsequently wore oversized jackets and hoodies paired with thigh-high boots through 2018 and 2019, which became largely associated with her persona. Grande later stated that owing to her mental health struggles at the time, she regularly wore variations of the oversized sweatshirt-boots outfit as she preferred to "hide away in something really cozy" and "did not have the mental energy to consider clothing". Grande's style is often imitated by social media influencers and celebrities. After years of dyeing her hair red for her role as Cat Valentine on Nickelodeon, Grande wore extensions as her hair recovered from damage. Anne T. Donahue of MTV News noted that her "iconic" high ponytail has received more attention than her fashion choices.

Although Grande drew criticism for alleged impolite interactions with reporters and fans in 2014, she dismissed the reports as "weird, inaccurate depictions". Rolling Stone wrote: "Some may cry 'diva', but it's also Grande just taking a stand to not allow others to control her image." In July 2015, Grande sparked controversy after being seen on surveillance video in a doughnut shop licking doughnuts that were on display and saying "I hate Americans. I hate America. This is disgusting", referring to a tray of doughnuts. She subsequently apologized, saying that she is "extremely proud to be an American" and that her comments rather referred to obesity in the United States. She later released a video apology for "behaving poorly". The incident was parodied by The Muppets. Grande herself poked fun at the incident while hosting Saturday Night Live in 2016, saying, "A lot of kid stars end up doing drugs, or in jail, or pregnant, or get caught licking a doughnut they didn't pay for." In 2020, she admitted to refraining from interviews for a while out of fear of being labeled a "diva" and that her words would be misconstrued.

With a large following on social media, Grande is one of the most influential celebrities on the Internet. As of November 2026, she is the third-most-subscribed female solo act and fourth-most-subscribed woman on YouTube, with over 58 million subscribers. Her channel has received over 33 billion views, and eight of her music videos have over one billion views; two of them have surpassed two billion views, with her highest-viewed video having over 2.4 billion views. Her Spotify profile has over 116 million followers, making her the eighth-most-followed artist and third-most-followed woman. On Instagram, Grande was the most-followed woman from February 2019 to January 2022 and was the first woman to surpass 200 million followers. She is the sixth-most-followed individual on the platform. In December 2021, Grande deleted her Twitter account, which was one of the most-followed accounts on the platform. She explained that "it started taking [a] toll on my relationship to work. I wanted to prioritize being an artist and having a healthy relationship to my fans and to art."

Often regarded as a pop icon and triple threat entertainer, wax figures of Grande are found at Madame Tussauds museums in various cities around the world, including New York City, Orlando, Amsterdam, Bangkok, Sydney, Berlin, London, Vienna, Hollywood, Hong Kong, and Blackpool.

== Recognition ==
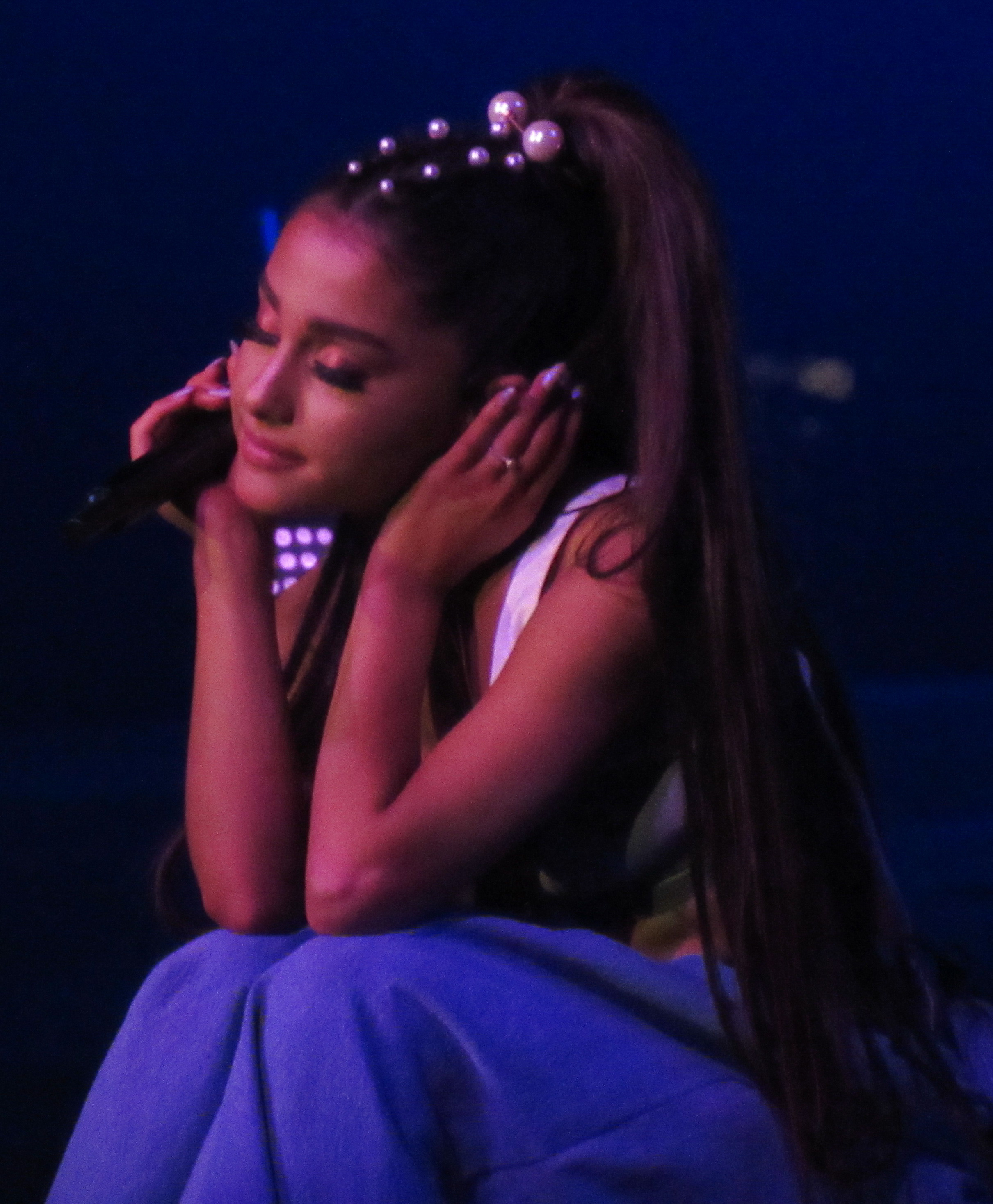
Grande performing on the Dangerous Woman Tour

In 2016 and 2019, Grande was named one of Time's 100 most influential people in the world. In 2017, Celia Almeida of the Miami New Times wrote that of all the biggest pop stars of the past 20 years, Grande made the most convincing transition "from ingénue to an independent female artist". Bloomberg News named her the "first pop diva of the streaming generation" in 2020. Regarded as a pop icon, Grande was nicknamed "Princess of Pop" by Guinness World Records. Due to her 2014 song "Santa Tell Me" becoming a 21st-century Christmas standard and having a lasting impact, Grande was dubbed the "Princess of Christmas". The single was respectively ranked number 13 and 19 on Billboard's "100 Best Christmas Songs of All Time" and "Greatest of All Time Holiday Songs" lists.

Grande was also included in Pitchfork's list of "The 200 Most Important Artists of Pitchfork's First 25 Years" for "emerging with music that pushed her artistry further as it asserted a magical trifecta of hope, joy, and a powerhouse voice". Her song "Thank U, Next" was ranked number 137 in Rolling Stone's 2021 revision of "The 500 Greatest Songs of All Time", and its parent album was ranked number 61 in their "250 Greatest Albums of the 21st Century" list. In 2023, the magazine ranked Grande among the 200 Greatest Singers of All Time, at number 43. The Hollywood Reporter named her as one of its "Platinum Power Players" in music in 2024. In May that year, Katy Perry declared Grande to be "the best singer of our generation". Billboard ranked Grande at number nine on its 2024 "Greatest Pop Stars of the 21st Century" list and at number eight on its 2025 list of the "Top 100 Women Artists of the 21st Century". The magazine ranked her album Thank U, Next at number 144 on its "Top 200 Billboard 200 Albums of the 21st Century" list in 2025.

Recording artists who have cited Grande as an influence or inspiration include Billie Eilish, Breanna Yde, Bryson Tiller, Chappell Roan, Charlie Puth, Giselle of Aespa, Grace VanderWaal, Jungkook of BTS, Lana Del Rey, Madison Beer, Maggie Lindemann, Meghan Trainor, Melanie Martinez, Michelle Zauner of Japanese Breakfast, Sufjan Stevens, Tate McRae, Troye Sivan, and Zara Larsson.

== Achievements ==
Grande has sold over 90 million records worldwide, making her one of the best-selling music artists of all time. All of Grande's studio albums have been certified Platinum or higher by the Recording Industry Association of America (RIAA). Her highest-certified album by the RIAA is My Everything, at quadruple Platinum, while her longest-charting album, Thank U, Next, has spent 205 non-consecutive weeks on the Billboard 200. Grande has accumulated 16 million albums and 141 million digital singles units as a lead artist in the United States, making her the eleventh-highest-certified artist and third-highest-certified female artist on the RIAA's Top Artists (Digital Singles) ranking. With 157 million units combined (songs and albums), she is the 17th-highest-certified artist overall and fifth-highest among women. In the US, Grande has moved 22.4 million album units and garnered over 23.6 billion streams across lead artist credits, as of 2023, according to Luminate. With over 43 million certified units, she is among the best-selling female artists in the UK. Two of her songs have been certified diamond by the RIAA: "Bang Bang" (with Jessie J and Nicki Minaj) and "7 Rings".

Having surpassed 98 billion streams globally as of 2021, Grande is one of the most-streamed artists of all time and was the first female artist to surpass 90 billion streams. She was the most-streamed female artist of the 2010s on Spotify, being the only woman in the overall top five. She was also the most-streamed female act of the 2010s on Apple Music and was the first woman to reach three billion total streams on the platform. As of June 2026, she is the 12th-most-streamed artist on Apple Music. Grande was the fourth-most-streamed artist and most-streamed female artist of the 2010s across audio and video streams in the US, being the only woman and non-rapper in the top five. She surpassed Rihanna as the most-streamed female artist on Spotify in 2020 and held the record for over two years. As of April 2026, Grande is the second-most-streamed woman and the fifth-most-streamed act on Spotify, with over 73 billion streams across all credits. She is the second woman in the platform's history to surpass 70 billion total streams.

Grande's songs and albums are some of the most-streamed of all time. She was the first woman with one and two billion streams with one album, 3.5 billion streams on three separate albums, and the first artist to have five albums with four billion streams on the platform. Grande has 22 songs with over one billion streams on Spotify, making her the female artist with the third-most songs to have achieved the feat; she was the first woman to have 14 and 22 tracks surpass the mark. Six of them have over two billion streams. Seven of her songs were included in Apple Music's "500 Most-Streamed Songs of All Time" list in 2026, with "7 Rings" and "Thank U, Next" at numbers 19 and 22. In December 2025, Grande surpassed 126.8 million monthly listeners on Spotify, a new record for a female act. She has also topped Spotify's monthly listener ranking the most times among women (5). Her 2014 single "Santa Tell Me" is the most-streamed Christmas song released in the 2010s—and third-most-streamed overall—on Spotify; the most successful holiday song released in the 21st century; and the eighth-most-popular holiday song of all time.

Grande has won three Grammy Awards, one Brit Award, fifteen MTV Video Music Awards (the fifth-most wins among women), three MTV Europe Music Awards, and three American Music Awards. She has received forty-two Billboard Music Award nominations and won two in 2019, including Top Female Artist. Grande has won eleven Nickelodeon Kids' Choice Awards, including one in 2014 for Favorite TV Actress for her performance on Sam & Cat and one in 2025 for Favorite Movie Actress for her performance in Wicked. She has received three People's Choice Awards. In 2014, she received the Breakthrough Artist of the Year Award from the Music Business Association and Best Newcomer at the Bambi Awards. She has won six iHeartRadio Music Awards and twelve Teen Choice Awards. Billboard named her Women in Music's Rising Star in 2014 and Woman of the Year in 2018; the greatest pop star of 2019, with honorable mentions in 2014 and 2018; and the year-end Top Female Artist of 2017 and 2019. She was ranked sixth among women (twelfth overall) on the magazine's decade-end Top Artists Chart for the 2010s. Billboard also ranked her as the sixth-greatest pop star of 2024, 78th on the "Greatest of All Time Hot 100 Artists" chart, and 19th on their "Top Artists of the 21st Century" list. Grande was named one of the ten best-selling global recording artists of 2018, 2019, and 2020 by the International Federation of the Phonographic Industry (IFPI), being the highest-ranked woman of 2018 (number eight). The IFPI ranked her as 2024 and 2025's eleventh-best-selling recording artist globally. For acting, Grande has won a Satellite Award; she has been nominated for an Academy Award, two Golden Globes, two Critics Choice Awards, three Actor Awards, and a BAFTA Award. In 2025, she received the Rising Star award at the 36th Palm Springs International Film Festival. Grande was also nominated for a Primetime Emmy Award as a principal performer/host of Wicked: One Wonderful Night.

Ten singles by Grande have topped the Billboard Hot 100, her most recent being "Hate That I Made You Love Me". She is the thirteenth artist in history to earn ten number-one hits on the Hot 100 (seventh overall among solo female artists). Grande has a total of twenty-five top-ten songs on the chart, including eighteen top-ten debuts, beginning with her first single "The Way"; the lead single from each of her first eight studio albums has debuted in the top ten, making her the only artist to achieve this. In 2020, she became the first act to debut her first five number-one singles, "Thank U, Next", "7 Rings", "Stuck with U", "Rain on Me", and "Positions", at the top spot; that year, Grande also broke the record for the most number-one debuts and became the first female artist to top the Global 200, Global 200 Excl. US, and Hot 100 charts simultaneously. Grande also became the first artist to debut three singles at number one in a single calendar year. She broke the record for the most simultaneously charting songs in the top 40 of the Hot 100 for a female artist with the release of Thank U, Next, when eleven of the twelve tracks charted within the region.

The three singles from Thank U, Next—"7 Rings", "Break Up with Your Girlfriend, I'm Bored", and "Thank U, Next"—charted at numbers one, two, and three respectively on the week of February 23, 2019, making Grande the first solo artist to occupy the top three spots of the Billboard Hot 100 and the first artist to do so since the Beatles in 1964. With Thank U, Next, Grande set the record for the largest streaming week for a pop album and for a female artist at the time, with 307 million on-demand audio streams. As of November 2026, Grande has 110 chart entries on the Hot 100, the fourth-most among women; she is the fourth woman to have over 100 entries on the chart. She is the female artist with the second-most number-one debuts on the Hot 100 (8). On the Billboard Global 200 chart, Grande has the third-most number-one songs (5) and the third- and fourth-most simultaneous entries in the top five (3) and top ten (5). Her 2021 remix of the Weeknd's "Save Your Tears" is the fifth-longest-charting song on the tally, with 300 weeks. On the Billboard Pop Airplay chart, Grande has 11 number-ones and 25 top-ten songs. She has the most number-one debuts among women (8) on the UK singles chart.

As of 2026, Grande has broken 41 Guinness World Records. These records included most songs to debut at number one on the Billboard Hot 100, most followers on Spotify (female), most monthly listeners on Spotify (female), most-streamed act on Spotify (female), most-streamed track in one week by a female artist on the Billboard charts, fastest hat-trick of UK No. 1 singles by a female artist, first female artist to replace herself at No. 1 on UK singles chart, first solo artist to replace themselves at No. 1 on UK singles chart for two consecutive weeks, most subscribers for a musician on YouTube (female), and most-streamed album by a female artist in one week (UK), among others. Eleven records were achieved from the success of Thank U, Next, which was featured in the 2020 edition.

== Philanthropy and activism ==
At age ten, Grande co-founded the South Florida youth singing group Kids Who Care, which performed at charitable fundraisers and raised over $500,000 in 2007 alone. In 2009, as a member of the charitable organization Broadway in South Africa, she and her brother Frankie performed and taught music and dance to children in Gugulethu, South Africa.

She was featured with Bridgit Mendler and Kat Graham in Seventeen magazine in a 2013 public campaign to end cyberbullying called "Delete Digital Drama". After watching the film Blackfish that year, she urged fans to stop supporting SeaWorld. In September 2014, Grande participated in the charitable Stand Up to Cancer television program, performing her song "My Everything" in memory of her grandfather, who had died of cancer that July. Grande has adopted several rescue dogs as pets and has promoted pet adoption at her concerts. In 2016, she launched a line of lip shades, "Ariana Grande's MAC Viva Glam", with MAC Cosmetics, the profits of which benefited people affected by HIV and AIDS. That same year, Grande and Andrea Martin participated in the Children of Armenia Fund (COAF) gala concert, a benefit for raising funds for impoverished children in Armenia, by encouraging people to buy tickets in support.

In 2015, Grande and Miley Cyrus performed a cover of Crowded House's "Don't Dream It's Over" as part of Cyrus's "Backyard Sessions" to benefit her Happy Hippie Foundation, which helps homeless and LGBTQ youths. Later that year, Grande headlined the Dance On the Pier event, part of the LGBT Pride Week in New York City. As a feminist, Grande wrote a well-received, "empowering" essay on Twitter decrying the double standard and misogyny in the focus of the press on female musicians' relationships and sex lives instead of "their value as an individual". She has also mentioned having "more to talk about" concerning her music and accomplishments rather than her romantic relationships. In 2016, Grande joined Madonna to raise funds for orphaned children in Malawi; she and Victoria Monét recorded "Better Days" in support of the Black Lives Matter movement.

To aid the victims of the Manchester Arena bombing in 2017, Grande organized the One Love Manchester benefit concert and re-released "One Last Time" and her live performance of "Over the Rainbow" at the event as charity singles. The total amount raised was reportedly $23 million (more than £17 million), and she received praise for her "grace and strength" in leading the benefit concert. Madeline Roth of MTV wrote that the performance "bolstered courage among an audience that desperately needed it. ... Returning to the stage was a true act of bravery and resilience". In 2017, Vulture writer Dee Lockett ranked the event as the best concert of the year, and Billboard's Mitchell Harrison called Grande a "gay icon" for her LGBTQ-friendly lyrics and performances and "support for the LGBTQ community".

In September 2017, Grande performed in A Concert for Charlottesville, which benefited the victims of the August 2017 white nationalist rally in Charlottesville, Virginia. In March 2018, she participated in March for Our Lives to support gun control reform. Grande donated the proceeds from the first show in Atlanta on her Sweetener World Tour to Planned Parenthood in response to the passage of several anti-abortion laws in several states, including Georgia. During the COVID-19 pandemic, Grande donated between $500 and $1,000 each to a number of fans as financial support. Grande also supported a COVID-19 fund named Project 100, which aimed to provide $1,000 digital payments to 100,000 families who have been greatly impacted by the pandemic.

In May 2020, Grande announced that all net proceeds from her collaboration with singer Justin Bieber, "Stuck With U", would be donated to the First Responders Children's Foundation to fund grants and scholarships for children of frontline workers who are working during the global pandemic. That month, Grande joined a Los Angeles protest against the murder of George Floyd, demanding justice and asking fans to sign petitions condemning the act of police brutality. She highlighted white privilege and called for more activism outside social media. In 2022, Grande surprised children spending the Christmas holiday period at hospitals in Manchester with gifts from wish lists at the Royal Manchester Children's Hospital, among others. Manchester Foundation Trust Charity revealed that Grande had gifted nearly 1,000 presents to patients across the hospital network's children's wards and newborn intensive care units in 2021.

In June 2021, Grande and other celebrities signed an open letter to Congress requesting passage of the Equality Act, highlighting that it would protect "marginalized communities". In the same month, Grande partnered with the online portal BetterHelp and gave away $2 million worth of therapy to fans. On International Transgender Day of Visibility in 2022, she launched the Protect & Defend Trans Youth Fund to benefit transgender youth, pledging to match every donation up to $1.5 million. In May 2022, Grande was among 160 artists and influencers who signed a "Bans Off Our Bodies" full-page advertisement in The New York Times in support of abortion rights in the US. Grande was also one of 175 entertainers to sign an open letter to oppose book bans in US schools in 2023. In June 2022, Grande endorsed Karen Bass for the 2022 Los Angeles mayoral election.

In 2023, Grande signed an open letter from Artists4Ceasefire to President Joe Biden during the Gaza war. In May 2024, after Israel launched an airstrike on Rafah, Grande shared a fundraiser aimed at providing humanitarian aid for Palestinians in Gaza. Following Biden's withdrawal from the 2024 United States presidential election, Grande showed support for vice president Kamala Harris's campaign. In January 2025, she reposted messaging from the nonprofit organization Advocates for Trans Equality via her social media in response to US President Donald Trump's order to withdraw federal recognition for transgender people. The following month, Grande advocated for therapy for young entertainers in both the acting and music fields, saying that weekly appointments should be built into their contracts. That June, she endorsed Alexandria Ocasio-Cortez's recommendation to impeach Trump for a "disastrous decision to bomb Iran without authorization". The next year, Grande launched the Brighter Days Ahead Foundation, a nonprofit organization focused on the LGBTQ community, youth mental health, arts education, and community support causes.

== Business and ventures ==
=== Products and endorsements ===
In November 2015, she released a limited edition handbag in collaboration with Coach. In January 2016, she launched a makeup collection with MAC Cosmetics, donating 100% of proceeds to the MAC AIDS Fund. In February 2016, Grande launched a fashion line with Lipsy London. Later that year, she teamed up with Brookstone to design cat-ear headphones, using the concept art of artist Wenqing Yan. In 2017, Grande collaborated with Square Enix to create a character based on herself for the mobile game Final Fantasy Brave Exvius. Grande was a limited-time unlockable character as part of the Dangerous Woman Tour event, which also included an orchestral remix of Grande's song "Touch It"; the character, Dangerous Ariana, is a magical support character who uses music-based attacks. In September 2017, she became a brand ambassador for Reebok.

In August 2018, she partnered with American Express for the Sweetener Sessions, a partnership which continued through the Sweetener World Tour in 2019, alongside T-Mobile. In March 2019, she partnered with Starbucks for the launch of the Cloud Macchiato beverage. In May 2019, Grande was announced as the face of Givenchy's fall-winter campaign. The campaign began in July and generated $25.13 million in media impact value. In July 2024, she became the brand ambassador of Swarovski; Grande's first appearance as the face was in the house's holiday campaign in October 2024. Grande collaborated with the company's global creative director Giovanna Battaglia Engelbert on two capsule collections, released in January 2025 and March 2026. Beats, Samsung, Fiat, Reebok, and Guess products have been featured in Grande's music videos. She has appeared in commercials for Macy's, T-Mobile, and Apple, as well as for her own fragrances. Since 2019, Grande has been among the ten highest-paid individuals on Instagram. As of 2025, Grande earns $2 million per sponsored Instagram post.

=== Fragrances ===
Grande has released twenty fragrances with Luxe Brands. She launched her debut fragrance, Ari by Ariana Grande, in 2015. In the wake of its success, she launched her third fragrance, Sweet Like Candy, in 2016. Her fifth fragrance, Moonlight, was released in 2017, followed by Cloud (2018), Thank U, Next (2019), R.E.M. (2020), and God Is a Woman (2021), which was later expanded to an Ulta-exclusive body care line in 2022. She then released the duo fragrance collection Mod Vanilla and Mod Blush (2022). It was followed by the collection Lovenotes (2024), which consisted of four region-exclusive fragrances released in North America, Europe, and Australia.

The next fragrances were Cherry Eclipse (2025), released as a R.E.M. Beauty product via Ulta, and Cloud Aurora (2026), the third variant in the Cloud line. The range also includes the limited editions Frankie (2016), Sweet Like Candy Limited Edition (2017), Thank U, Next 2.0, Cloud Intense (both 2021), Cloud Pink (2023), Glinda Bubbly Pink, and Elphaba Enchanted (both 2025). The last two of these were released in partnership with Universal Products & Experiences as tie-in products for the film Wicked: For Good. The fragrances won the FiFi Award multiple times, most recently with R.E.M. in 2021. In 2022, it was reported that Cloud was the best-selling fragrance at Ulta, selling one bottle every eleven seconds. As of 2024, the scents are developed and manufactured in collaboration with Robertet Group and International Flavors & Fragrances. Grande's fragrance line is the most-searched celebrity offering, with over 4.4 million searches across Google and social media platforms per year as of 2023. Since its launch in 2015, the franchise has made over $1 billion in retail sales globally.

=== R.E.M. Beauty ===
In November 2021, Grande launched her makeup line, R.E.M. Beauty, which is distributed at Ulta Beauty as of March 2022. The original line featured 12 core products for lips and eyes, and the range has since been expanded with additional skincare and makeup products. Forbes reported in 2022 that R.E.M. Beauty was one of the brands boosting Ulta's gross margin due to strong consumer demand. In May, the line won "Best New Brand" at the Allure Best of Beauty Awards. In February 2023, the brand was launched in 81 Sephora stores and 13 online sites, including across Europe.

== Personal life ==
Grande has said she struggled with hypoglycemia, stating that she recovered from it by changing her eating habits. She has been following a vegan diet since 2013.

Grande developed post-traumatic stress disorder (PTSD) and anxiety after the Manchester Arena bombing; she nearly pulled out of her performance in the 2018 broadcast A Very Wicked Halloween due to anxiety. Grande has also said she has been in therapy for over a decade, having first seen a mental health professional shortly after her parents' divorce. Raised Catholic, she left the church during the pontificate of Benedict XVI (c. 2013), opposing its stance on homosexuality and stating that her half-brother Frankie is gay. Grande said that she and Frankie later visited a Kabbalah Centre, and that they both "really had a connection with it". Several of her songs, such as "Break Your Heart Right Back", are supportive of LGBT rights. She has also been labeled "an advocate for a sex-positive attitude".

=== Politics ===
In November 2019, Grande endorsed Bernie Sanders's second presidential bid. She endorsed Joe Biden for the 2020 presidential election and Kamala Harris for the 2024 presidential election.

In June 2025, amid ICE enforcement operations in Los Angeles, Grande wrote on Instagram that she was "deeply upset about these violent deportations" and that "LA simply wouldn't exist without immigrants", sharing ACLU resources on immigrant rights. At the 83rd Golden Globes on January 11, 2026, Grande wore an "ICE Out" pin as part of a coordinated campaign in response to the killing of Renée Good by an ICE agent in Minneapolis. Later that month, she promoted a nationwide protest against ICE on her Instagram Story, urging followers to participate in the "ICE Out Nationwide Shutdown" on January 30.

In June 2026, the White House used a snippet of Grande's song "Bye" in a TikTok promoting ICE. She commented on the post: "Please do not ever use my music in relation to this barbaric, inhumane, heinous nonsense." The White House later told US media: "What's actually barbaric, inhumane, and heinous are the criminal illegal ‌aliens who have injured and murdered innocent American citizens." Shortly after, Grande's song was removed from the video.

=== Legal dispute ===
In late July 2026, it was reported by multiple media outlets that Grande had sued hackers who she alleges "have stolen unreleased music, as well as private photos and video footage, and sold them online". As reported by Billboard and The Hollywood Reporter, it is alleged that the hackers accessed the online accounts of various people working with Grande, leading to the leaking of 45 songs in 2023 alone, and that the stolen assets were sold on the dark web. Some of the stolen assets include Grande's unreleased tracks "Fantasize", "That Bitch Is Mine", and "White Tee". According to The Guardian, Grande filed the lawsuit in a Los Angeles court on July 27.

=== Relationships ===
Grande's personal relationships have been widely scrutinized by the public. Some of her former lovers were mentioned by name in the song "Thank U, Next". She dated her 13 co-star Graham Phillips for three years. From August 2012 to August 2014, Grande was in an on-again, off-again relationship with Australian YouTuber Jai Brooks. She briefly dated English singer Nathan Sykes during their separation, and then dated rapper Big Sean for eight months. Grande was in a year-long relationship with Ricky Alvarez, who was one of her backup dancers on the Honeymoon Tour.

After recording "The Way" in 2012, Grande began dating rapper Mac Miller in 2016. She was prominently featured on his fourth album, The Divine Feminine (2016), including its third single, "My Favorite Part". By May 2018, their relationship had ended, and Grande entered a whirlwind romance with comedian Pete Davidson. They got engaged in June after a few weeks of dating, and a song titled after and inspired by Davidson was featured on Sweetener. That September, Miller died from an accidental drug overdose; Grande expressed grief over his death on social media and called him her "dearest friend". She and Davidson called off their engagement and ended their relationship the following month.

Grande began dating real estate agent Dalton Gomez in January 2020. Their relationship, while mostly private, was made public in May 2020. Grande announced their engagement on December 20, 2020, after 11 months of dating. On May 15, 2021, they married in a private ceremony at her home in Montecito, California. Her wedding pictures became the second-most-liked Instagram post and the most-liked Instagram post featuring pictures of people at the time, with over 25 million likes. Grande and Gomez separated on February 20, 2023, and simultaneously filed for divorce that September due to "irreconcilable differences". They agreed on a divorce settlement in October, which was finalized in March 2024. Shortly after Grande's separation from Gomez was confirmed in July 2023, it was also confirmed that she had begun dating her Wicked co-star Ethan Slater. They separated in 2026, and Grande later rekindled her relationship with Alvarez.

== Filmography ==
=== Films and television ===
- Victorious (2010–2013)
- Sam & Cat (2013–2014)
- Swindle (2013)
- Underdogs (2016)
- Hairspray Live! (2016)
- Don't Look Up (2021)
- Wicked (2024) (Note: Credited as Ariana Grande-Butera.)
- Brighter Days Ahead (2025) (Note: Short film; also co-writer, co-director and executive producer.)
- Wicked: For Good (2025)
- Focker-in-Law (2026)

=== Documentaries and concert specials ===
- One Love Manchester (2017)
- Ariana Grande at the BBC (2018)
- Ariana Grande: Dangerous Woman Diaries (2018)
- Ariana Grande: Excuse Me, I Love You (2020)

== Discography ==
- Yours Truly (2013)
- My Everything (2014)
- Dangerous Woman (2016)
- Sweetener (2018)
- Thank U, Next (2019)
- Positions (2020)
- Eternal Sunshine (2024)
- Petal (2026)

== Live performances and tours ==
=== Musical theater ===
Year	Production	Role	Director	Venue	Notes	Ref.
2008	13	Charlotte	Jeremy Sams	Norma Terris Theatre, Chester		
2008–2009	13	Charlotte	Jeremy Sams	Bernard B. Jacobs Theatre, Manhattan	Original Broadway Cast	
2012	A Snow White Christmas	Snow White	Bonnie Lythgoe	Pasadena Playhouse		

=== Tours ===
==== Headlining ====
- The Listening Sessions (2013)
- The Honeymoon Tour (2015)
- Dangerous Woman Tour (2017)
- Sweetener World Tour (2019)
- The Eternal Sunshine Tour (2026)

==== Promotional ====
- The Sweetener Sessions (2018)

==== Opening act ====
- Justin Bieber – Believe Tour (2013)

== See also ==
- List of American Grammy Award winners and nominees
- List of artists who have achieved simultaneous UK and U.S. number-one hits
- List of artists who reached number one in the United States
- List of Billboard Social 50 number-one artists
- UK singles chart records and statistics
