= R.E.M. Beauty =

Cosmetics brand

R.E.M. Beauty LLC
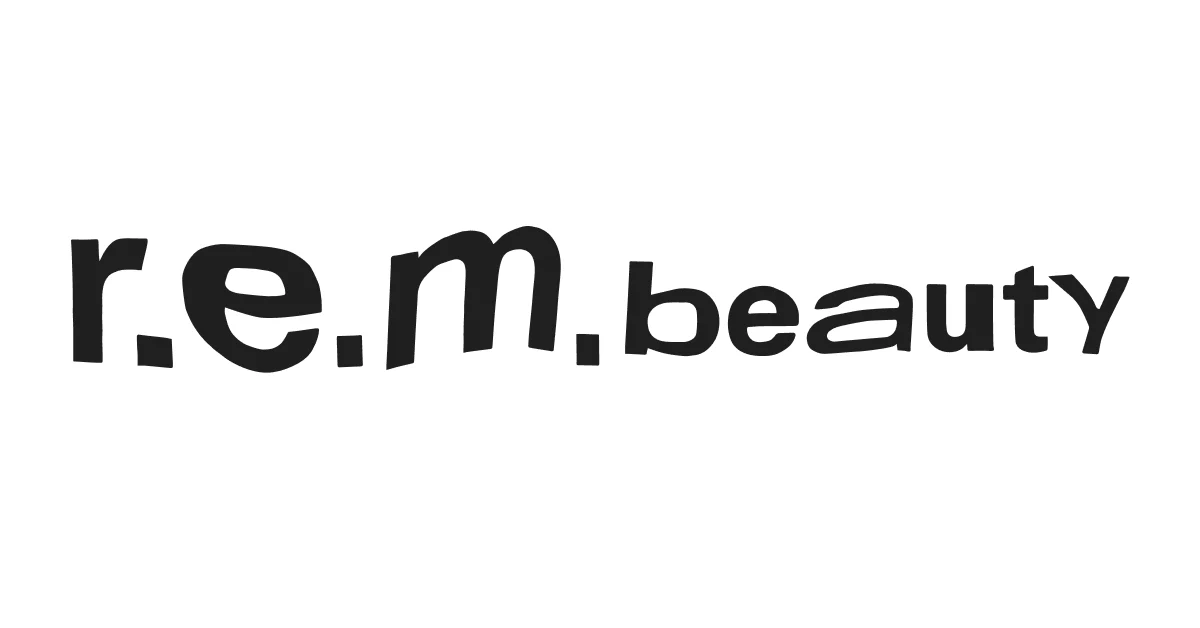
- Industry: Cosmetics
- Founded: November 12, 2021; 5 years ago
- Founder: Ariana Grande
- Area served: Worldwide
- Key people: Ariana Grande (Chairwoman, Owner), André Branch (CEO), Sarah Schwartz (Creative Director)
- Products: Cosmetics
- Revenue: US $88.7 million (2024)
- Owner: Ariana Grande
- Website: rembeauty.com

R.E.M. Beauty LLC (formally as r.e.m. beauty) is a cosmetics brand by singer Ariana Grande, launched on November 12, 2021. It is known for its space-age aesthetic, vegan and cruelty-free formulas, and a product range that spans skincare, lips, eyes, and complexion.

== History ==
=== 2021–2023 ===
In August 2021, several billboards appeared across Times Square in New York City, saying "r.e.m. coming soon." The pop singer and actress later revealed that her beauty line "is officially on its way". Grande officially launched her cosmetic company on November 12, 2021. Her first collection was named: Chapter 1: Ultraviolet.

In March 2022, the brand launched their Chapter 2: Goodnight and Go line, taking its name from her version of the song from Sweetener. After their launch, many of their cosmetic products were distributed throughout Ulta Beauty stores across the United States, as of April 2022. Forbes reported that R.E.M. Beauty was one of the brands boosting Ulta's driving gross margin due to strong consumer demand.

In June 2022, R.E.M. Beauty released its third collection Chapter 3: On Your Collar expanding the brand’s lip category with satin lipsticks, lip oils, a lip balm, and lip liners. This was followed by Chapter 4: Out of Body in July 2022, which introduced a range of complexion-focused products such as the Sweetener Concealer (available in 60 shades) designed for customizable coverage and skin correction, the Lunar Magic Blurring Primer, blotting papers, and a makeup sponge.

In January 2023, R.E.M. Beauty released the limited-edition "Thank U, Next" Collection, inspired by Grande’s fifth studio album of the same name and its lead single. The Y2K- themed capsule featured curated makeup sets and new variations of glosses, eyeliners, and gem-encrusted lashes. The launch took place just days before Forma Brands, the parent company of Morphe Cosmetics, filed for bankruptcy, leading to the termination of its licensing agreement with R.E.M. Beauty. Subsequently, Grande acquired the brand's physical assets for an estimated $15 million, bringing the company under her full ownership.

In February 2023, R.E.M. Beauty officially launched in 81 Sephora stores and 13 online sites across Europe, including Sephora UK. This expansion marked the brand's first physical retail presence in Europe. Grande expressed her excitement about the launch, stating, "It's incredibly special and meaningful to be finally launching the brand here in Europe, especially with Sephora, the world's most beloved destination for beauty." Shortly after, Grande appointed Michelle Shigemasa as Chief Executive Officer and Sarah Schwartz as Creative Director.

In August 2023, the Sweetener Foundation was introduced, marking R.E.M. Beauty’s first foundation line. It launched with 60 shades, covering a wide range of fair to deep skin tones, and features ingredients like niacinamide, hyaluronic acid, and vitamin E.

== Awards ==
In May 2022, the cosmetic company won the award for "Best New Brand" at the Readers' Choice Awards from Allure, with Flourishing Lengthening Mascara being awarded for "Best Mascara (Length)" in the category of "Best Eye Makeup" of 2022 at its annual Best of Beauty Awards.

Award	Year	Category	Recipient(s) and nominee(s)	Result	Ref.
Allure Best of Beauty Awards	2022	Best New Brand (Note: Readers' Choice Award)	r.e.m. beauty by Ariana Grande	Won	
Allure Best of Beauty Awards	2022	Best Eye Makeup (Length)	r.e.m. beauty by Ariana Grande	Won	
Cosmopolitan UK Beauty Awards	2022	Best Concealer (Note: Cosmopolitan Winter Beauty Award)	r.e.m. beauty by Ariana Grande	Won	
Ex. Awards	2022	Best Buzz Marketing/Influencer Program	r.e.m. beauty by Ariana Grande	Silver	
Popsugar Beauty Awards	2022	Best Liquid Eyeliner	r.e.m. beauty by Ariana Grande	Won	
SELF Healthy Beauty Awards	2022	Best Liquid Eyeliner	r.e.m. beauty by Ariana Grande	Won	
Selfridges Beauty Awards	2022	Launch of the Year	r.e.m. beauty by Ariana Grande	Won	
Webby Awards	2022	Best Fashion & Beauty (Note: People's Voice Winner)	r.e.m. beauty by Ariana Grande	Won	
Webby Awards	2022	Best Mobile User Interface	r.e.m. beauty by Ariana Grande	Won	
Webby Awards	2022	Best Mobile Visual Design - Aesthetic	r.e.m. beauty by Ariana Grande	Won	
Woman&Home Beauty Awards	2022	Best Multitasker	r.e.m. beauty by Ariana Grande	Won	
Cosmopolitan Holy Grail Beauty Awards	2023	Best Liquid Eyeliner	r.e.m. beauty by Ariana Grande	Won	
Cosmopolitan Readers’ Choice Beauty Awards	2023	Best Celebrity Brand	r.e.m. beauty by Ariana Grande	Won	
Glamour Beauty Awards	2023	Best Face Mist (Note: Glamour Beauty & Wellness Awards)	r.e.m. beauty by Ariana Grande	Won	
Glamour Beauty Awards	2023	Best Eyeshadow	r.e.m. beauty by Ariana Grande	Won	
InStyle Best Beauty Buys	2023	Best Liquid Eyeliner in the world	r.e.m. beauty by Ariana Grande	Won	
PETA's Libby Awards	2023	Heroes — Favorite Celeb Cruelty-Free Beauty Brand	r.e.m. beauty by Ariana Grande	Nominated	
PETA's Libby Awards	2023	Lifestyle — Favorite Cruelty-Free Beauty Product	r.e.m. beauty by Ariana Grande	Nominated	
Shop Today Beauty Awards	2023	Best Liquid Eyeshadow	r.e.m. beauty by Ariana Grande	Won	
Style Beauty Awards	2023	Best Celebrity Brand	r.e.m. beauty by Ariana Grande	Nominated	
Vogue Beauty Awards	2023	The New Kid On The Block (Note: Vogue British Beauty Awards)	r.e.m. beauty by Ariana Grande	Won	
Glamour Beauty Awards	2024	Best Liquid Eyeliner	r.e.m. beauty by Ariana Grande	Won	
PETA's Libby Awards	2024	Lifestyle — Favorite Vegan and Cruelty-Free Eye Shadow	r.e.m. beauty by Ariana Grande	Nominated	
SELF Healthy Beauty Awards	2024	Best Blush, Powder	r.e.m. beauty by Ariana Grande	Won	
Cosmopolitan Readers’ Choice Beauty Awards	2025	Best Celebrity Brand	r.e.m. beauty by Ariana Grande	Nominated	
Cosmopolitan Readers’ Choice Beauty Awards	2025	Best Highlighter	r.e.m. beauty by Ariana Grande	Won	
