= Ariana Grande at the BBC =

Television special starring Ariana Grande

- Directed by: Richard Valentine
- Presented by: Davina McCall
- Starring: Ariana Grande
- Country of origin: United Kingdom
- Original language: English

Production
- Executive producers: Anouk Fontaine; Guy Freeman
- Producer: Colin Farquhar
- Running time: 60 minutes
- Production company: Livewire Pictures

Original release
- Network: BBC One
- Release: 1 November 2018

Ariana Grande at the BBC is a BBC television special featuring Ariana Grande. Grande performed thirteen songs during the hour-long special, and was interviewed by Davina McCall. The program was announced on 31 August 2018, recorded on 7 September, and aired on 1 November.

== Program ==
Grande performed the following songs, backed by an all-female orchestra:

- "No Tears Left to Cry"
- "Dangerous Woman"
- "Breathin"
- "Goodnight n Go"
- "R.E.M"
- "Only 1"
- "God Is a Woman"
- "Love Me Harder"
- "One Last Time"

Grande also performed "Better Off", "Pete Davidson", "Get Well Soon", and a cover of "Them Changes" by Thundercat during the recording, however these performances weren't shown on the special. However, an edited version of the special where the removed songs were shown while the interviews were cut out was shown on international TV broadcasts and platforms.

During the interview, Grande and McCall discussed a variety of topics, including the May 2017 Manchester Arena bombing, her new album Sweetener, as well as the singer's mental health.

== Broadcast and reception ==
The special was broadcast on BBC One on 1 November 2018. According to the BBC, at least 1.4 million viewed the program. Adam White of The Telegraph rated the special four out of five stars.

The special, which was known as Ariana Grande Live in London outside of the United Kingdom, was also aired in various countries across the world.

Country	Network(s)	Date(s)	Ref.
France	NRJ Hits	19 December 2018	
Ireland	RTÉ2	31 December 2018	
Norway	NRK1	1 January 2019	
Switzerland	SRF zwei	8 June 2019	
Germany	3sat	31 December 2019	
Poland	Canal+ Premium	7 June 2020	
Brazil	Bis	9 September 2020	
Czech Republic	ČT art	23 October 2020	
Vietnam	K+ CINE	2 February 2022	
Greece	ERT2	3 October 2022	
Brazil	RecordTV	28 December 2022	

== Credits and personnel ==
The special was produced by Livewire Pictures, with Anouk Fontaine and Guy Freeman serving as executive producer and Colin Farquhar as producer. It was directed by Richard Valentine. The program was commissioned by Jan Younghusband and Charlotte Moore.

== See also ==
- 2018 in British television
