= A Very Wicked Halloween =

2018 NBC television special

- Promotional poster
- Also known as: A Very Wicked Halloween: Celebrating 15 Years on Broadway
- Genre: Music
- Written by: Dave Boone
- Directed by: Glenn Weiss
- Presented by: Kristin Chenoweth; Idina Menzel
- Composer: Stephen Schwartz
- Country of origin: United States
- Original language: English

Production
- Executive producers: Marc Platt; David Stone; Ricky Kirshner; Glenn Weiss
- Editors: Yossi Kimberg; Jessie Rogowski
- Running time: 42 minutes
- Production companies: Marc Platt Productions; White Cherry Entertainment

Original release
- Network: NBC
- Release: October 29, 2018

A Very Wicked Halloween: Celebrating 15 Years on Broadway is a Halloween television special commemorating fifteen years since the premiere of the musical Wicked on Broadway. The concert special aired on NBC on October 29, 2018, and was hosted by Kristin Chenoweth and Idina Menzel, and featured performances by Ariana Grande, Adam Lambert, Ledisi and Pentatonix.

== Program ==
The program included performances by Menzel, Chenoweth, Grande (who would later portray Glinda in the musical's two-part film adaptation Wicked (2024) and Wicked: For Good (2025)), Lambert, Ledisi, Pentatonix, the then-current Broadway company of the musical and others, singing many of the musical numbers from Wicked to a live studio audience at the Marquis Theatre in New York. The concert special was directed by Glenn Weiss.

- "One Short Day" – Broadway cast of Wicked
- "As Long as You're Mine" – Ledisi and Adam Lambert
- "Popular" – Kristin Chenoweth
- "What Is This Feeling?" – Pentatonix
- "Defying Gravity" – Idina Menzel
- "The Wizard and I" – Ariana Grande
- "For Good" – Chenoweth and Menzel, joined by several other Glindas/Elphabas from the history of the show.
