= Stage-to-film adaptation =

Stage-to-film is a term used when describing a motion picture that has been adapted from a stage play. There have been stage-to-film adaptations since the beginning of motion pictures. Many of them have been nominated for, or have won, awards.

== List of stage-to-film adaptations that won the Best Picture award ==
The following stage-to-film adaptations have won the Academy Award for Best Picture.

- Grand Hotel (1932, originally a novel, then a stage play)
- Cavalcade (1933)
- You Can't Take It with You (1938)
- Casablanca (1943), based on the play Everybody Comes to Rick's.
- Hamlet (1948)
- Gigi (1958, like Grand Hotel, originally a novel, then a stage play)
- West Side Story (1961)
- My Fair Lady (1964)
- The Sound of Music (1965)
- A Man for All Seasons (1966)
- Oliver! (1968)
- Amadeus (1984)
- Driving Miss Daisy (1989)
- Chicago (2002)
- Moonlight (2016) (based on an unpublished play)

== Oscar-winning stage performances onscreen ==
Actors and actresses who won Oscars for re-creating stage roles on film include:

- George Arliss (the title role in the sound version of Disraeli)
- Laurence Olivier (the title role in the 1948 Hamlet)
- José Ferrer (the title role in the 1950 Cyrano de Bergerac)
- Judy Holliday (Billie Dawn in the original Born Yesterday)
- Vivien Leigh (Blanche in A Streetcar Named Desire) (she appeared in the London production, not in the Broadway one)
- Karl Malden (Mitch in A Streetcar Named Desire)
- Kim Hunter (Stella Kowalski in A Streetcar Named Desire)
- Shirley Booth (Lola Delaney in Come Back, Little Sheba)
- Yul Brynner (the King of Siam in the original The King and I)
- Rita Moreno (Anita in West Side Story)
- Anne Bancroft (Annie Sullivan in The Miracle Worker)
- Patty Duke (Helen Keller in The Miracle Worker)
- Rex Harrison (Professor Higgins in My Fair Lady)
- Paul Scofield (Thomas More in A Man for All Seasons)
- Jack Albertson (John Cleary in The Subject Was Roses)
- Liza Minnelli (Sally Bowles in Cabaret)
- Joel Grey (the Emcee in Cabaret)
- Barbra Streisand (Fanny Brice in Funny Girl)
- Catherine Zeta-Jones (Velma Kelly in Chicago)
- Jennifer Hudson (Effie White in Dreamgirls)
- Anne Hathaway (Fantine in Les Miserables)
- Viola Davis (Rose Maxon in Fences)
- Ariana DeBose (Anita in West Side Story)

== Problems with stage-to-film adaptations ==
Most stage-to-film adaptations must confront the charge of being "stagy". Many successful attempts have been made to "open up" stage plays to show things that could not possibly be done in the theatre (notably in The Sound of Music, in which the Alps and the city of Salzburg were displayed, in Frost/Nixon, and in Franco Zeffirelli's and Kenneth Branagh's respective films of Shakespeare plays). Many critics claim to notice the origins of stage-to-film adaptations when the characters speak. A play depends mostly on dialogue, so there is supposedly more of it in a play than in a film, and more of a tendency for the characters to make long speeches and/or soliloquies. Writers, directors and critics often claim that film makes more use of short, abrupt sentences, realistic ways of speaking, and physical action than the stage does. Another supposedly "dead giveaway" that a film is based on a play is confining great chunks of the action to one room, as in the faithful 1962 film version of Eugene O'Neill's Long Day's Journey into Night, or as in Laurence Olivier's Richard III. Olivier deliberately emphasized the fact that his Henry V (1944) was based on a play by having the film begin at what was supposed to be Shakespeare's Globe Theatre, then moving into deliberately fake scenery and having the scenery gradually become more and more real until finally the viewing audience is looking at a real location, finally gradually switching back to the Globe Theatre.

On some occasions, playwrights re-write their stage dramas for the screen, as Peter Shaffer did for Amadeus (1984), and as Peter Morgan did with Frost/Nixon (2008). Shaffer's screenplay made much use of camera movements and scenery that could only be suggested on-stage, as did Morgan with Frost/Nixon. For Amadeus, Shaffer even added scenes and heavily revised others for his original creation to take advantage of the medium. The scene in which the ill Mozart dictates his Requiem Mass to Salieri, while his imagined music is heard on the soundtrack, could only have been done on film. The film also allowed the music to be heard in six-track hi-fi sound, while in the play the audience heard it through tinny loudspeakers.

In other cases, such as Camille (1936), Cabaret (1972), and One Flew Over the Cuckoo's Nest (1975), the original stage dialogue is completely discarded and an entirely new script is written for the film version, even if the basic plot of the play is still followed. This has also happened with musical films such as the 1936 and 1954 film versions of Rose-Marie, the 1943 and 1953 versions of The Desert Song, and the 1954 version of The Student Prince. In the case of the 1936 Rose-Marie, the plot of the film had almost nothing to do with the stage version, other than using a very few of the stage version's songs, having a Canadian setting, and having Mounties as characters. In the case of adaptations of stage musicals, it happened most often with musical films produced before 1955, the year that the faithful film version of Oklahoma! was released. The quick succession of other Rodgers and Hammerstein films, all close adaptations of their stage originals, caused other studios to continue to adapt Broadway musicals to the screen with fewer changes than had been customary in the past.

In the case of the unsuccessful Broadway musical Paint Your Wagon, new characters and songs were added, and the stage musical's plot was almost completely changed for the 1969 film, in order to bolster the film's chances of success.
