= Bloodline (Ariana Grande song) =

2019 song by Ariana Grande

Song by Ariana Grande

from the album Thank U, Next
- Studio: Wolf Cousins (Stockholm); MXM (Los Angeles)
- Length: 3:36
- Label: Republic
- Songwriters: Ariana Grande; Max Martin; Ilya Salmanzadeh; Savan Kotecha
- Producers: Max Martin; Ilya

Audio video
- "Bloodline" on YouTube

"Bloodline" (stylized in all lowercase) is a song by American singer-songwriter Ariana Grande from her fifth studio album, Thank U, Next (2019) through Republic Records. It was written by Ariana Grande, Savan Kotecha, and its producers Max Martin and Ilya Salmanzadeh.

Commercially, "Bloodline" reached the top 10 in Greece and Hungary, as well as top 20 in Australia, Canada, Portugal, Singapore and Slovakia. It peaked at number 22 in the United States.

== Background ==
"Bloodline" was first confirmed to be a part of the track listing via Instagram on January 22, 2019. On January 23, 2019, Grande said that the song is about "wanting somebody but not enough to have them in your bloodline".

The record features a sound bite from Marjorie Grande, Grande's grandmother, in which she is talking about a hearing aid. However, Grande cut it down so it sounds like she is talking about sex. Grande also stated that she used this sound bite because her grandmother is the "matriarch of the bloodline".

== Composition and lyrics ==
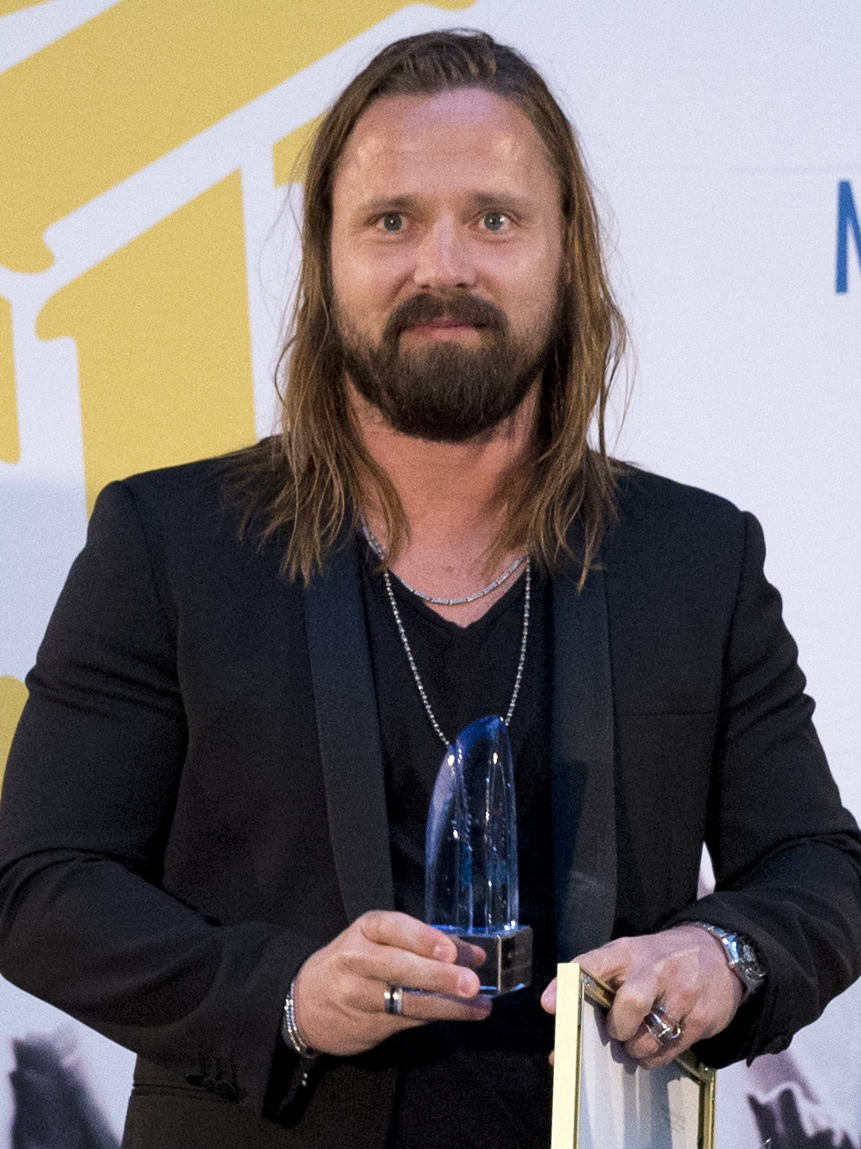
Max Martin (pictured in 2015) co-wrote and co-produced the song.

"Bloodline" was written by Ariana Grande, Savan Kotecha, and its producers Max Martin and Ilya Salmanzadeh. Grande's vocals were recorded by at the MXM Studios in Los Angeles and Wolf Cousins Studios in Stockholm. It has been compared to Grande's 2016 single "Side to Side" from Grande's third studio album Dangerous Woman (2016).

== Critical reception ==
The song received favorable reviews from the music critics. Michael Cragg of The Guardian stated that the song "posits the idea that maybe it’s best to just see how things go relationship-wise and getting engaged after a few months isn’t essential", believing that this song is about Pete Davidson, Grande's ex-fiancé. Tegwyn Hughes of The Queen's Journal says that along with fellow album tracks "bad idea" and "make up," the song "leave[s] behind notions of romance in favour of sexuality and fun without attachment."

== Commercial performance ==
"Bloodline" debuted at number 22 on the US Billboard Hot 100 chart issue dated February 23, 2019, earning Grande her 21st top-30 entry in the nation, as well as becoming her 4th highest-charting non-single after "Needy", "NASA" and "Imagine" which also appear on the parent album.

In Australia, "Bloodline" debuted at number 11, surpassing the three aforementioned songs above. It consequently became Grande's highest position for a non-single and her 19th top-twenty hit in the country In Canada, the song debuted at number 18, after "Needy" and "NASA".

In France, "Bloodline" debuted at number 97 being the highest-charting song from the album and the only top 100 entry along with "Needy". In Italy, it debuted at number 98, being the only track not released as a single charting there. In Norway, it reached number 24, also being the only track from the album, not released as a single, to chart there.

== Live performances ==
"Bloodline" was performed during the Sweetener World Tour, from March 18, 2019, to June 19, 2019.

== Credits and personnel ==
Credits adapted from Tidal.

- Ariana Grande – lead vocals, songwriter, vocal producer
- Savan Kotecha – songwriter
- Max Martin – songwriter, producer, programmer, bass, guitar, drums, keyboards
- Ilya Salmanzadeh – songwriter, producer, programmer, bass, guitar, drums, keyboards
- Marjorie "Nonna" Grande – backing vocals
- Wojtek Bylund – alto saxophone
- Mattias Bylund – horn arranger
- Tomas Jonsson – tenor saxophone
- Peter Noos Johansson – trombone
- Janne Bjerger – trumpet
- Magnus Johannson – trumpet
- Serban Ghenea – mixer, studio personnel
- John Hanes – assistant mixer, studio personnel
- Cory Bice – assistant recording engineer, studio personnel
- Jeremy Lertola – assistant recording engineer, studio personnel

== Charts ==
Chart performance for "Bloodline"
Chart (2019)	Peak position
Australia (ARIA)	11
Canada Hot 100 (Billboard)	18
Czech Republic Singles Digital (ČNS IFPI)	26
France (SNEP)	97
Germany (GfK)	42
Greece International (IFPI)	6
Hungary (Single Top 40)	8
Hungary (Stream Top 40)	12
Italy (FIMI)	98
Latvia (LAIPA)	26
Lithuania (AGATA)	12
Netherlands (Single Top 100)	36
New Zealand (Recorded Music NZ)	28
Norway (VG-lista)	24
Portugal (AFP)	18
Scottish Singles Sales (Official Charts)	39
Singapore (RIAS)	15
Slovakia Singles Digital (ČNS IFPI)	11
Spain (Promusicae)	61
Sweden (Sverigetopplistan)	24
UK Singles Downloads (Official Charts)	28
UK Audio Streaming (Official Charts)	9
US Billboard Hot 100	22

== Certifications ==
Certifications for "Bloodline"
Region	Certification	Certified units/sales
Australia (ARIA)	Platinum	70,000^{‡}
Brazil (Pro-Música Brasil)	2× Platinum	80,000^{‡}
New Zealand (RMNZ)	Platinum	30,000^{‡}
Poland (ZPAV)	Gold	25,000^{‡}
United Kingdom (BPI)	Gold	400,000^{‡}
United States (RIAA)	Platinum	1,000,000^{‡}
^{‡} Sales+streaming figures based on certification alone.
