= In My Head (Ariana Grande song) =

2019 song by Ariana Grande

Song by Ariana Grande

from the album Thank U, Next
- Released: February 8, 2019
- Studio: Conway (Los Angeles); Entirety (London); Jungle City (New York City)
- Genre: R&B; trap; pop
- Length: 3:42
- Label: Republic
- Songwriters: Andrew "Pop" Wansel; Ariana Grande; Nathan "Happy" Perez; Brittany "Chi" Coney; Denisia Andrews; Lindel Deon Nelson Jr.; Jameel Roberts
- Producers: Pop Wansel; Happy Perez; NOVA Wav

Music video
- "In My Head" on YouTube

"In My Head" (stylized in all lowercase) is a song by American singer Ariana Grande, on her fifth studio album, Thank U, Next (2019). The track was written by Grande, Lindel Deon Nelson Jr., and Jameel Roberts alongside its producers Andrew "Pop" Wansel, Nathan "Happy" Perez and NOVA Wav's members Brittany "Chi" Coney and Denisia Andrews. It is a trap, R&B, and pop song that Grande says talks about "being in love with a version of somebody you've created in your head". Critics debated whether the subject of the song was comedian Pete Davidson or rapper Mac Miller, both former partners of Grande, and praised its personal lyrics. Following the release of Thank U, Next, it entered the charts in a number of countries including: Australia, Canada, Greece, the United Kingdom, the United States.

An unannounced music video for "In My Head", directed by Bardia Zeinali, was released on July 9, 2019. It was produced by the team at Vogue, who interviewed and featured Grande on the cover of its August 2019 issue. The video depicts the singer with her signature style as she dances and performs the track in a bright white room that represents her own mind. It received positive reviews from critics, who noted its minimalist style and compared it with clips released in the late 1990s. Grande never performed the song live, but the studio version was played as an interlude during her Sweetener World Tour (2019).

== Development ==
"In My Head" was finished in twelve hours. It was written by Ariana Grande, Andrew "Pop" Wansel, Nathan "Happy" Perez, Lindel Deon Nelson Jr., Jameel Roberts, and NOVA Wav's members Brittany "Chi" Coney and Denisia Andrews. Wansel and Perez handled the production and programming and played the keyboards alongside Jproof. NOVA Wav co-produced the track, while Joe Gallagher engineered it. Grande produced the vocals, and Perez played the guitar. Recording took place in three studios: Conway Recording Studios in Los Angeles, California; Entirety Studios in London, England; and Jungle City Studios in New York City. Serban Ghenea mixed "In My Head" with assistance from John Hanes at MixStar Studios in Virginia Beach, Virginia. Randy Merrill mastered it at Sterling Sound Studios in New York City.

"In My Head" includes a recorded voicemail by Grande's best friend, Doug Middlebrook, which was added after the track was finished because it suited the lyrics. Initially, a quote by Jack Nicholson saying "You seem to have things strangely confused in your mind" in a movie was used, but was later removed for legal reasons. Grande explained, "he was a major help to me thru some very difficult moments so i wanted to capture that a lil, give him a musical hug. It's also his favorite song so it fits."

== Composition ==
"Here's the thing: you're in love with a version of a person that you've created in your head, that you are trying to but cannot fix. Uh, the only thing you can fix is yourself. I love you, this has gone on way too long. Enough is enough. I'm two blocks away. I'm coming over."

— Recorded voicemail by Doug Middlebrook, Grande's best friend, included on the beginning of "In My Head"

"In My Head" is a trap, R&B, and pop song, with a length of three minutes and forty-two seconds. The track is written in the key of G major and set in common time signature, with an electro ballad tempo of 68 beats per minute. Grande's vocals span from the low note of G_{3} to the high note of G_{5}. The song begins with the recorded voicemail by Middlebrook, then continues with a synthetic drum beat and a distended bassline while the artist sings the opening lines, "Painted a picture, I thought I knew you well / I got a habit of seeing what isn't there". During the chorus, Grande sings the lyrics, "But it was all in my head" in a high vocal register. The track ends with a "pulsing" outro that ends with an echo. The singer said via Twitter the song talks about "being in love w a version of somebody you've created in your head [sic]. Falling for someone that they are not".

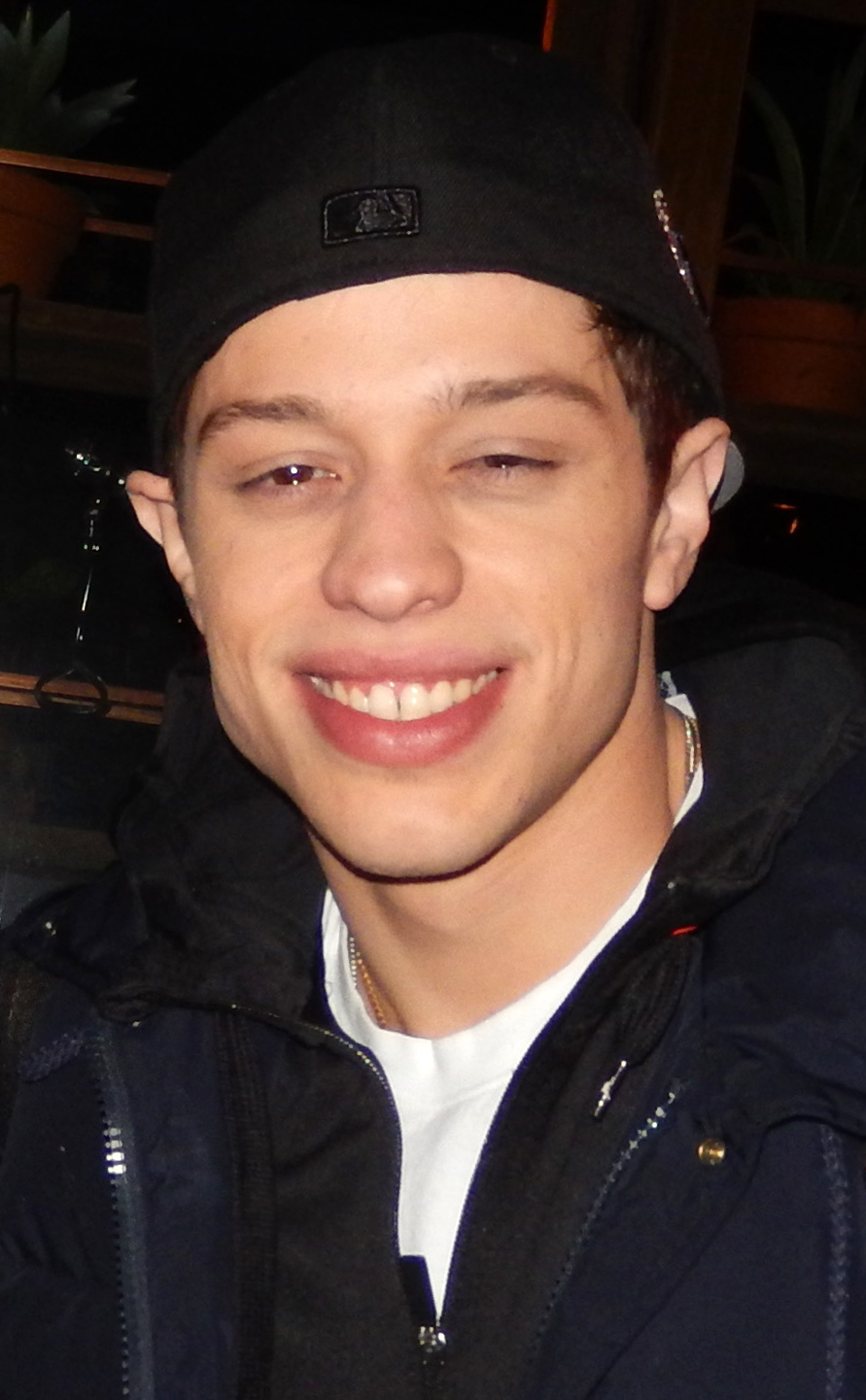
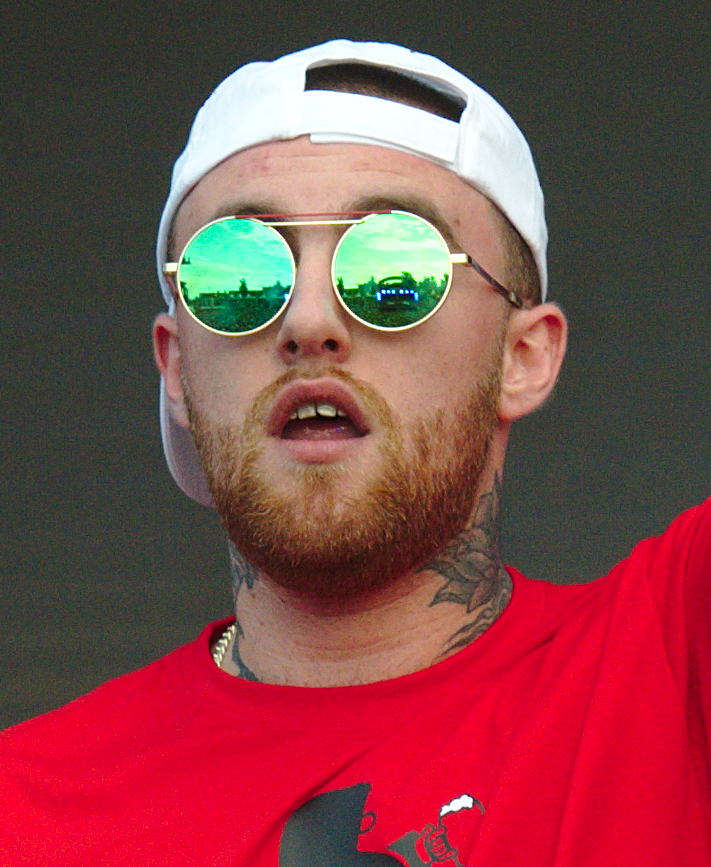
Critics debated whether the subject of "In My Head" was either comedian Pete Davidson (left) or rapper Mac Miller (right), both former partners of Grande.

Many critics suggested that "In My Head" detailed Grande's relationship with her former fiancé, comedian Pete Davidson, while others opined it talked about her break-up with rapper Mac Miller. Stephanie Eckardt of W said that the verse, "My imagination's too creative / They see demon, I see angel, angel, angel", may refer to Miller, whom Grande described as an "angel" in "Thank U, Next" (2018); however, she also said that the line "Look at you, boy, I invented you / Your Gucci tennis shoes runnin' from your issues" talked about Davidson's increased popularity after dating the singer.

Writing for Genius, Chris Mench commented on this ambiguity, saying the tone of the song was "too harsh" to be about Miller, who died in September 2018, and concluded the lyrics were more likely to be directed towards Davidson. Elizabeth Ogbonna of The Lantern said that the song "detail[s] how [Grande] deluded herself into only seeing the good and fun things in her ex-fiancé Pete Davidson, while simultaneously ignoring his scrutiny from the media and her fans." In a July 2019 interview with Vogue, who would sponsor the music video for "In My Head", Grande stated she "loved" but "didn't know" Davidson; some journalists felt her comments paralleled the song's lyrics.

== Critical reception ==
Mallorie List of Complex ranked "In My Head" at number 22 on her list of the Best Ariana Grande songs, commenting it was a "real testament to Grande's dedication to a fresh start, as it falls right in line with the new sound she introduced with her first singles from Thank U, Next. Cosmopolitan's Hannah Chambers felt "In My Head", was similar to "Bad Idea" and "Fake Smile", as "moody bops", since they were "emotional" but sounded "fun". The Guardian's Michael Cragg said that both "Ghostin" and "In My Head" were the album's "emotional centrepiece" and a "double whammy" for Davidson. Craig Jenkins of Vulture wrote the track's themes were "sign of growth" from Grande, since she criticizes herself as well as her romantic partner. Similarly, Daniel Welsh of HuffPost considered it one of the most personal tracks from the record and compared its theme with Katy Perry's "Wide Awake". He also said the line "My imagination's too creative, they see demon, I see angel" was a standout lyric. Alani Vargas of Bustle considered it one of the best songs from Thank U, Next, while Billboard's Richard S. He called it "one of the album's moodiest, most underrated cuts".

Raúl Guillén of the Spanish website Jenesaispop deemed it a somber, powerful and defiant track. He added that it complemented "Ghostin", as both had the toughest and most sincere lyrics, not only from Thank U, Next, but from the singer's discography. Mathew Rodríguez of Out noted the track had some of the album's "shadiest lyrics" and "busiest production"; however, he also said it was "noisy" at times. Writing for The Atlantic, Spencer Kornhaber said the song did not have a memorable hook, while Carmen Chan and Nicole Almeida of Atwood Magazine felt the spoken intro was unnecessary.

== Commercial performance ==
"In My Head" entered some countries' charts following the release of Thank U, Next. The track debuted at number 38 on the February 23, 2019, issue of the US Billboard Hot 100; it was one of eleven songs by Grande to chart that week in the first 40 positions. With this, the singer became the female artist with most tracks to appear simultaneously in the top 40 in one issue, surpassing Cardi B, who had nine songs there on April 21, 2018. The following week, it fell to number 74. "In My Head" entered the Canadian Hot 100 at number 34 also on the February 23, 2019, issue. The next week it dropped to number 71.

In Greece, "In My Head" debuted at number 28 on the Digital Singles Chart International on the sixth week of 2019. In the next edition, the song reached its peak position at number 21. The following week, the track fell to number 72. On the chart dated February 16, 2019, "In My Head" debuted at number 36 on the Australian ARIA Singles Chart. The next week, it fell thirty-seven positions to number 73. In the United Kingdom, the track appeared at numbers 20 and 80 on the Audio Streaming and Download charts, respectively, on February 15, 2019. The following week, it fell to number 57 on the Audio Streaming chart, and dropped off the Download chart. The track failed to enter the Swedish Singles Top 100, but peaked at number one on the Heatseeker Top 20, an extension chart that compiles the most popular songs that have yet to appear on the main list. Elsewhere, "In My Head" peaked at number 48 in both Portugal and Slovakia, 68 in the Netherlands, 75 in Scotland and 94 in the Czech Republic.

== Music video ==
=== Development and release ===
Despite not being promoted as an official single, a music video for "In My Head" was directed by Bardia Zeinali and choreographed by Scott Nicholson. It was produced by the team from Vogue, as part of the singer's interview and subsequent appearance on the cover of the magazine's August 2019 issue. For clip's concept, Zeinali wanted to showcase the things that make Grande an "iconic" artist; he explained, "It's the voice, it's the ponytail, it's the boots, it's the silhouette. So we decided that we wanted to create an iconic video where we're isolating the Ariana iconography, and playing it up and having a good time with it." He also added that the visuals were "a little bit sci-fi, it's a little bit [Stanley] Kubrick, it's a little Y2K". To achieve this, they used three back-up dancers in green suits against a green screen who wore pony-tails and thigh-high boots similar to Grande to look like "disembodied" versions of the singer. The music video was released unannounced on July 9, 2019, through Vogue's website and YouTube channel. One day later, a behind-the-scenes clip was posted on both sites. "In My Head" is the fourth music video from the album, after "Thank U, Next", "7 Rings" and "Break Up with Your Girlfriend, I'm Bored", and the first non-single from the record to have a videoclip.

=== Synopsis ===
The music video for "In My Head" features Grande, her hair in a ponytail, in a white room and wearing her signature style: thigh-high boots, black body suit, a puffer jacket and skirt, as director Bardia Zeinali wanted to showcase the things that make her an "iconic" artist.

The music video features Grande with a ponytail wearing her signature style: thigh-high boots, black body suit, a puffer jacket and skirt as she dances and performs the track in a bright white room that, according to Vogue, represents her own mind and the "creative claustrophobia" of being herself. In some parts, the artist sings a cappella, and the clicking of her heels becomes audible.

=== Reception ===
"In My Head" was reviewed by music journalists, with many of them noting its simple and minimalist style, while others felt it was influenced by music videos released in the 1990s. Winston Cook-Wilson of Spin compared the style to that of late-1990s music videos, as well as to the work of director Hype Williams. Bustle's Alani Vargas said it stands out on its own from the singer's previous clips, and added that, "Despite the simplicity of the setting, the video does give a sense of being corralled into her own little bubble, possible highlighting how Grande writes her music." Richard S. He of Billboard compared the setting to the set of Jamiroquai's "Virtual Insanity" (1996) as well as to other music videos released in the late 1990s and the early 2000s. He also commented the artist "gives one of her most emotionally grounded performances to date" and felt she has "grown tremendously as a visual artist and performer". Mike Nied of Idolator called it "a simple but thoughtful affair" and added that Grande "offers a glimpse into her mind" in the plot. Writing for E! News, Jamie Blynn commented that, unlike the singer's previous music videos from Thank U, Next, "In My Head" "strips away the elaborate theatrics and backup dancers", since it only featured Grande in a white room wearing a puffer jacket, skirt, bodysuit and boots.

== Credits and personnel ==
Credits adapted from the liner notes of Thank U, Next.

Locations

- Recorded at Conway Recording Studios in Los Angeles, California; Entirety Studios in London, England and Jungle City Studios in New York City
- Mixed at MixStar Studios in Virginia Beach, Virginia
- Mastered at Sterling Sound Studios in New York City

Personnel

- Lead vocals – Ariana Grande
- Songwriting – Ariana Grande, Andrew Wansel, Nathan Perez, Brittany "Chi" Coney, Denisia Andrews, Lindel Deon Nelson, Jr., Jameel Roberts
- Production – Pop Wansel, Happy Perez, NOVA Wav
- Programming – Pop Wansel, Happy Perez
- Mixing – Serban Ghenea
- Mixing assistance – John Hanes
- Mastering – Randy Merrill
- Vocal production – Ariana Grande
- Keyboards – Pop Wansel, Happy Perez, Jproof
- Guitars – Happy Perez

== Charts ==
Weekly chart performance for "In My Head"
Chart (2019)	Peak position
Australia (ARIA)	36
Canada Hot 100 (Billboard)	34
Czech Republic (Singles Digitál Top 100)	94
Netherlands (Single Top 100)	68
Greece International (IFPI)	21
Lithuania (AGATA)	33
Portugal (AFP)	48
Scottish Singles Sales (Official Charts)	75
Slovakia (Singles Digitál Top 100)	48
Swedish Heatseeker (Sverigetopplistan)	1
UK Singles Downloads (Official Charts)	80
UK Audio Streaming (Official Charts)	20
US Billboard Hot 100	38

== Certifications ==
Certifications and sales for "In My Head"
Region	Certification	Certified units/sales
Australia (ARIA)	Gold	35,000^{‡}
Brazil (Pro-Música Brasil)	Platinum	40,000^{‡}
New Zealand (RMNZ)	Gold	15,000^{‡}
United Kingdom (BPI)	Silver	200,000^{‡}
^{‡} Sales+streaming figures based on certification alone.
