= Imagine (Ariana Grande song) =

2018 song by Ariana Grande

Promotional single by Ariana Grande

from the album Thank U, Next
- Released: December 14, 2018
- Studio: Jungle City (New York City)
- Genre: R&B; pop; trap
- Length: 3:31
- Label: Republic
- Songwriters: Ariana Grande; Andrew "Pop" Wansel; Nathan Perez; Priscilla Renea; Jameel Roberts
- Producers: Pop Wansel; Happy Perez

Ariana Grande promotional singles chronology
"The Light Is Coming" (2018)	"Imagine" (2018)	"Just Look Up" (2021)

Lyric video
- "Imagine" on YouTube

"Imagine" (stylized in all lowercase) is a song recorded by American singer Ariana Grande. The song was written by Grande, Jameel Roberts and Priscilla Renea alongside its producers Andrew "Pop" Wansel and Happy Perez. It was released on December 14, 2018, as the only promotional single from her fifth studio album Thank U, Next (2019).

Commercially, the song reached the top 10 in Greece, Hungary, Ireland, Malaysia, Singapore, Slovakia and the United Kingdom, as well as the top 20 in Australia, Canada, New Zealand, Portugal and Scotland. The track also peaked at number 21 on the US Billboard Hot 100.

== Background and release ==
On December 11, 2018, Grande teased the song with a post on her Instagram story, with a countdown of its official release. The song was previewed a day later, with Grande tweeting the title using Chinese characters. The song and its official lyric video were released simultaneously on December 14, 2018, with the lyrics set to a glitching background of a collapsing glacier made by glitch artist Thomas Collet.

== Composition ==
"Imagine" is an R&B/pop ballad with a trap-inspired rhythm. It is written in the key of F minor, and has a tempo of 125 BPM. The song features multiple whistle registers, and Grande's vocals span from F_{3} to C_{7}. Lyrically, the song speaks about Grande's denial of failed relationships. Grande described the song as being about "a simple, beautiful love that is now (and forever) unattainable."

== Critical reception ==
"Imagine" has been widely regarded as one of Grande's best songs. In 2021, The Guardian ranked the song number three on their list of the 20 greatest Ariana Grande songs, and in 2022, Rolling Stone ranked the song number eight on their list of the 50 greatest Ariana Grande songs.

== Commercial performance ==
"Imagine" proved to be Grande's most successful promotional single. On the issue dated December 29, 2018, "Imagine" debuted at number 24 on the US Billboard Hot 100 as the highest new entry of the week, while starting on the Streaming Songs at number 21 and the Digital Songs at number two. "Imagine" fell to number 71 in its second week on the Hot 100, however rebounded and surged to number 63 in its third week. It spent an additional week there and departed the region after four consecutive weeks. Following the release of Grande's own "7 Rings", "Imagine" re-entered the Billboard Hot 100 at number 99 due to strong digital downloads, spending a fifth week there. After the release of the parent album Thank U, Next, "Imagine" re-entered the US charts for a third time at a new peak of number 21, consequently becoming the sixth highest-charting track from the album and third highest-charting non-single behind "Needy" and "NASA" which debuted at numbers 14 and 17 the same week, respectively. The track ultimately charted for a total of eight weeks on the Hot 100.

Internationally, "Imagine" reached the top ten in Belgium, Hungary, Ireland, Singapore, Slovakia and the United Kingdom, where it debuted at number eight on the UK Singles Chart. The track also peaked at number 15 on the Australian ARIA Singles Chart, number 16 on the New Zealand Singles Chart, and number 17 on the Canadian Hot 100. Its lowest position was in France, where it reached number 110.

== Live performances ==
Grande performed "Imagine" for the first time on The Tonight Show Starring Jimmy Fallon on December 18, 2018. The song was excluded from the set list of the Sweetener World Tour because it was "too heavy" to perform, according to Grande. On January 26, 2020, Grande performed the song in a medley with "7 Rings", "My Favorite Things", and "Thank U, Next" at the 62nd Annual Grammy Awards.

== Credits and personnel ==
Credits adapted from Tidal.

- Ariana Grande – lead vocals, songwriting, vocal production
- Andrew "Pop" Wansel – production, songwriting, keyboard, programming
- Nathan Perez – production, songwriting, guitar, keyboard, programming
- Priscilla Renea – songwriting
- Jameel Roberts – songwriting
- John Hanes – mixing engineer
- Serban Ghenea – mixing
- Brendan Morawski – recording engineer
- Joe Gallagher – recording engineer
- Sean Klein – assistant recording engineer
- Andrew Luftman – production coordinator
- Sarah Shelton – production coordinator
- Zvi Edelman – production coordinator

== Charts ==
=== Weekly charts ===
Chart performance for "Imagine"
Chart (2018–2019)	Peak position
Australia (ARIA)	15
Belgium (Ultratip Bubbling Under Flanders)	5
Belgium (Ultratip Bubbling Under Wallonia)	16
Canada Hot 100 (Billboard)	17
Czech Republic Singles Digital (ČNS IFPI)	35
France (SNEP)	110
Germany (GfK)	60
Greece International Digital Singles (IFPI)	5
Hungary (Single Top 40)	3
Hungary (Stream Top 40)	18
Ireland (IRMA)	4
Italy (FIMI)	64
Latvia (LAIPA)	20
Malaysia (RIM)	10
Netherlands (Dutch Top 40)	38
Netherlands (Single Top 100)	32
New Zealand (Recorded Music NZ)	16
Portugal (AFP)	19
Scottish Singles Sales (Official Charts)	11
Singapore (RIAS)	10
Slovakia Singles Digital (ČNS IFPI)	8
Spain (Promusicae)	80
Sweden (Sverigetopplistan)	51
Switzerland (Schweizer Hitparade)	35
UK Singles (Official Charts)	8
US Billboard Hot 100	21

=== Year-end charts ===
2018 year-end chart performance for "Imagine"
Chart (2018)	Position
Netherlands (Dutch Top 40)	191

== Certifications ==
Certifications and sales for "Imagine"
Region	Certification	Certified units/sales
Australia (ARIA)	Platinum	70,000^{‡}
Brazil (Pro-Música Brasil)	2× Platinum	80,000^{‡}
New Zealand (RMNZ)	Platinum	30,000^{‡}
Norway (IFPI Norway)	Gold	30,000^{‡}
Portugal (AFP)	Gold	5,000^{‡}
United Kingdom (BPI)	Gold	400,000^{‡}
United States (RIAA)	2× Platinum	2,000,000^{‡}
^{‡} Sales+streaming figures based on certification alone.

== Release history ==
Release dates for "Imagine"
Region	Date	Format	Label	Ref.
Various	December 14, 2018	Digital download; streaming	Republic	
