= Ghostin =

Song by Ariana Grande

from the album Thank U, Next
- Released: February 8, 2019
- Recorded: October 2018
- Studio: Jungle City (New York City); MXM (Los Angeles); Wolf Cousins (Stockholm)
- Genre: Art pop
- Length: 4:31
- Label: Republic
- Songwriters: Ariana Grande; Max Martin; Ilya Salmanzadeh; Savan Kotecha; Victoria Monét; Tayla Parx
- Producers: Max Martin; Ilya

Audio video
- "Ghostin" on YouTube

"Ghostin" (stylized in all lowercase) is a song by American singer Ariana Grande. It is the eighth track on her fifth studio album Thank U, Next, which was released on February 8, 2019. The song was written by Grande, Victoria Monét, Tayla Parx, Savan Kotecha and its producers Max Martin and Ilya Salmanzadeh.

"Ghostin" peaked at number 25 on the US Billboard Hot 100 and was a top 40 entry in Australia, Canada, Lithuania, Portugal, and Slovakia.

== Background and release ==
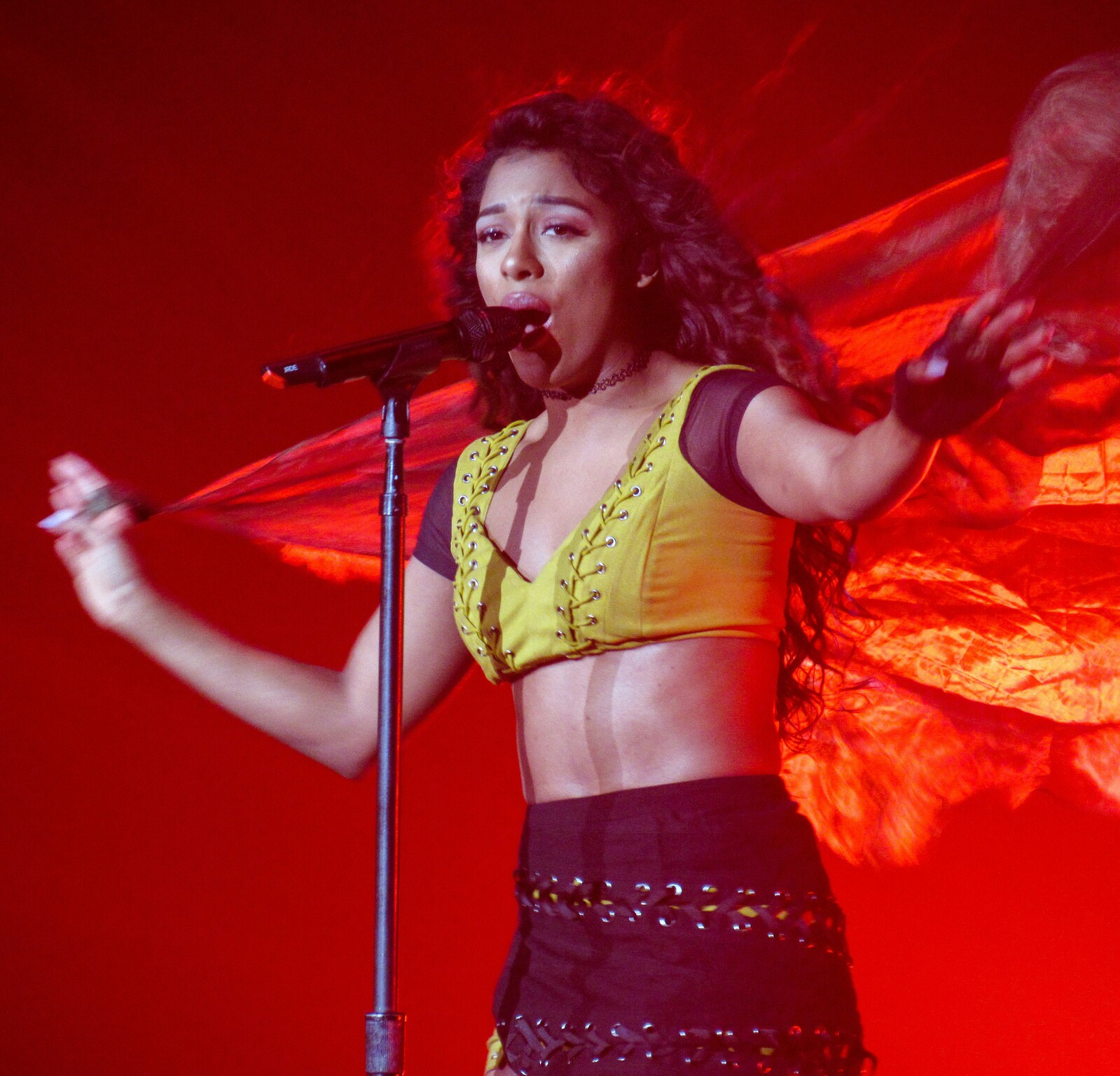
Victoria Monét (pictured in 2017) co-wrote the song.

"Ghostin" was written by Ariana Grande, Victoria Monét, Tayla Parx, Savan Kotecha, and producers Max Martin and Ilya Salmanzadeh, for Grande's fifth studio album Thank U, Next (2019). Grande's vocals were recorded at Jungle City Studios in New York City. According to Grande, it was the first song written for the album and took the longest to write: "We had to take [little] breaks from 'Ghostin'. That was the first hook done and then we came back and did the verses like two weeks later... everything else we did in like an hour." She also stated that it was the hardest song to write for the album, particularly the second verse. After completing the song, Grande did not want to release it and begged her manager Scooter Braun to remove it from the album, but he convinced her to keep it.

"Ghostin" was released with the album on February 8, 2019, by Republic Records. Not comfortable enough to perform the song, Grande excluded it from the set list of her Sweetener World Tour.

== Composition ==
Ghostin is an emotional synths and strings pop and art pop ballad. When asked what the song is about in January 2019, Grande responded: "Feeling badly for the person you're with [because] you love somebody else. Feeling badly [because] he can tell he can't compare... and how I should be ghosting him.". The song is thought to be about Grande grieving for her ex-boyfriend Mac Miller, who died from a drug overdose in September 2018, while she was with her then-fiancé Pete Davidson. In a February 2019 interview, co-writer Savan Kotecha said: "The song speaks for itself in terms of what it’s about. We were with her for a week in New York witnessing that, witnessing her feelings on that."

== Critical reception ==
Michael Cragg of The Guardian called the song an "emotional centrepiece", "gorgeous" and praised Martin's "production that seems to levitate on a pillow-soft blend of eerie backwards synths and big syrupy strings". Billboard's Andrew Unterberger described the song as "the album's barest, most emotional track [...] one that, appropriately, lingers with you well after it's gone."

In 2021, The Guardian ranked the song number five on their list of the 20 greatest Ariana Grande songs, and in 2022, Rolling Stone ranked the song number three on their list of the 50 greatest Ariana Grande songs.

== Commercial performance ==
The song debuted on the February 23, 2019 issue of the Billboard Hot 100 at number 25 in the United States, becoming Grande's 22nd top thirty entry and one of her highest-charting non-singles on the chart to date.

== Credits and personnel ==
Credits adapted from Tidal.

- Ariana Grande – lead vocals, songwriting, vocal production
- Victoria Monét – background vocals, songwriting, vocal production
- Tayla Parx – songwriting
- Savan Kotecha – songwriting
- Max Martin – songwriting, production, vocal production, bass, guitar, keyboards, programming
- Ilya Salmanzadeh – songwriting, production, vocal production, bass, guitar, keyboards, programming
- Serban Ghenea – mixing
- John Hanes – mixing assistant
- David Bukovinszky – cello
- Mattias Bylund – strings
- Mattias Johansson – violin
- Brendan Morawski – engineering
- Sam Holland – engineering
- Cory Bice – engineering assistant
- Jeremy Lertola – engineering assistant
- Sean Klein – engineering assistant

== Charts ==
Chart performance for "Ghostin"
Chart (2019)	Peak position
Australia (ARIA)	26
Canada Hot 100 (Billboard)	27
Czech Republic Singles Digital (ČNS IFPI)	53
France (SNEP)	151
Greece International (IFPI)	23
Hungary (Stream Top 40)	34
Lithuania (AGATA)	27
Netherlands (Single Top 100)	58
Portugal (AFP)	36
Scottish Singles Sales (Official Charts)	45
Slovakia Singles Digital (ČNS IFPI)	37
Sweden (Sverigetopplistan)	68
UK Singles Downloads (Official Charts)	44
UK Audio Streaming (Official Charts)	15
US Billboard Hot 100	25

== Certifications ==
Certifications and sales for "Ghostin"
Region	Certification	Certified units/sales
Australia (ARIA)	Gold	35,000^{‡}
Brazil (Pro-Música Brasil)	Platinum	40,000^{‡}
New Zealand (RMNZ)	Gold	15,000^{‡}
United Kingdom (BPI)	Silver	200,000^{‡}
United States (RIAA)	Platinum	1,000,000^{‡}
^{‡} Sales+streaming figures based on certification alone.
