= Thank U, Next =

2019 studio album by Ariana Grande

- Digital, clear LP edition and Japanese CD/DVD deluxe edition cover (Note: The standard physical edition uses the same cover, except the border is colored black instead of pink.)

Studio album by Ariana Grande
- Released: February 8, 2019
- Recorded: October–December 2018
- Studios: Jungle City, Right Track (New York City); MXM, Conway (Los Angeles); The Record Plant (Hollywood); Wolf Cousins (Stockholm); Entirety (London)
- Genres: Pop; R&B; trap
- Length: 41:11
- Label: Republic
- Producers: Charles Anderson; Brian Baptiste; Tommy Brown; Michael Foster; Ilya; Max Martin; Happy Perez; Pop Wansel

Ariana Grande chronology
Sweetener (2018)	Thank U, Next (2019)	K Bye for Now (SWT Live) (2019)

Singles from Thank U, Next
- 1. "Thank U, Next" Released: November 3, 2018; 2. "7 Rings" Released: January 18, 2019; 3. "Break Up with Your Girlfriend, I'm Bored" Released: February 8, 2019

Thank U, Next (stylized in all lowercase) is the fifth studio album by American singer Ariana Grande. It was released on February 8, 2019, by Republic Records, six months after her fourth studio album, Sweetener (2018). Songwriters and producers that collaborated with Grande on the album included Tommy Brown, Max Martin, Ilya Salmanzadeh and Pop Wansel.

Grande began working on Thank U, Next in October 2018 amidst several personal struggles, including the death of ex-boyfriend Mac Miller and the end of her engagement to Pete Davidson. She opted not to use the traditional promotion cycle employed for her previous releases. Primarily a pop, R&B and trap record, Thank U, Next was described as Grande's most personal record up to that point, with its lyrical content reflecting on personal flaws, grief and denial, as well as independence and self-empowerment.

The album was preceded by two singles: the title track and "7 Rings", both of which debuted atop the Billboard Hot 100 chart, becoming Grande's first two number-one songs in the United States. "Break Up with Your Girlfriend, I'm Bored" became the third single on the day of the album's release, peaking at number two on the Hot 100. All of the album's 12 tracks entered the Hot 100, with the singles occupying the top three spots, making Grande the first soloist to achieve this feat. The album topped the charts in 17 countries, and broke many streaming records upon release, including the records for the largest weekly streams for a pop album and a female album in the United States. It was certified double platinum by the Recording Industry Association of America, and landed at number two on the US Billboard 200 Year-End chart of 2019. Globally, it was the eighth best-selling album of 2019, and fourth best-selling album by a female artist.

Upon its release, Thank U, Next received critical acclaim, with praise for its cohesiveness, production, and Grande's vulnerability throughout the record. It was named by several publications as the best album of 2019 and was included in numerous year-end and decade-end lists. The album and its songs received nominations for four Grammy Awards (including Album of the Year), an American Music Award, a Billboard Music Award and a Juno Award. In support of both Sweetener and Thank U, Next, Grande embarked on the Sweetener World Tour from March to December 2019, which grossed over $146 million from 97 shows.

== Background and recording ==
In August 2018, singer Ariana Grande's Sweetener was released to critical acclaim, her best received album to that point. Grande began contemplating her follow-up as she prepared touring. Republic Records sought to bolster Sweetener's global rollout by releasing "Breathin" as the third single, but the label abruptly postponed their promotional endeavors when Grande's old friend and ex-boyfriend, rapper Mac Miller, died from an accidental drug overdose in early September. Grande then took a brief hiatus from the media to record new material. By the following month, the still reticent singer expressed renewed interest in touring, one supporting both Sweetener and her forthcoming project, and she soon announced the initial leg of her Sweetener World Tour. At the same time, Grande ended her five-month engagement with comedian Pete Davidson.

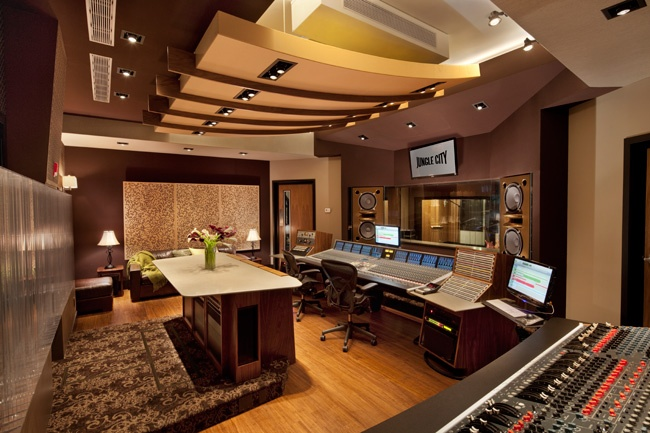
The bulk of Thank U, Next was recorded at the Jungle City Studios in New York City

Thank U, Next's recording commenced less than two months after the release of Sweetener. The producers conducted most of their recordings at Jungle City Studios in New York City and scheduled additional sessions in New York's Right Track Studios, MXM, Conway Recording Studios and the Record Plant in metropolitan Los Angeles, Wolf Cousins Studios in Stockholm, and Entirety Studios in London.

The fallout of Miller's death influenced Grande's choice of collaborators. She assembled Thank U, Next's production team from producers and songwriters with shared rapport to better cope with the trauma. Songwriters included her longtime collaborators Victoria Monet, Max Martin, Ilya Salmanzadeh, and Tommy Brown in addition to Tayla Parx, Social House, and others.

The development of Thank U, Next was unusually swift, but productive. Grande and her team wrote about nine songs in merely a week, and they completed most of the recording after another two weeks. Grande's team kept champagne in the studio, notably Veuve Clicquot, as later referenced in her collaboration with songwriter Victoria Monét, "Monopoly". Monét contributed to six songs, including "Ghostin", the first and simultaneously longest song to develop. Grande found creating "Ghostin" difficult and initially requested the song's exclusion from the final track listing.

== Composition ==
=== Music and lyrics ===
Thank U, Next is a pop, R&B and trap record with many influences of hip hop on its beats and productions. It explores a diversity of other music genres, including dancehall, soul, pop-rap and many urban influences. Rob Sheffield from Rolling Stone stated that the album is about a woman taking her mood "out for a drive until she pedal-to-the-metals it right off a cliff." In an interview with Zach Sang she said: "We walked to the studio everyday, and just made music and it turned everything around in my life. It sounds very corny but it was like, the most beautiful."

=== Songs ===
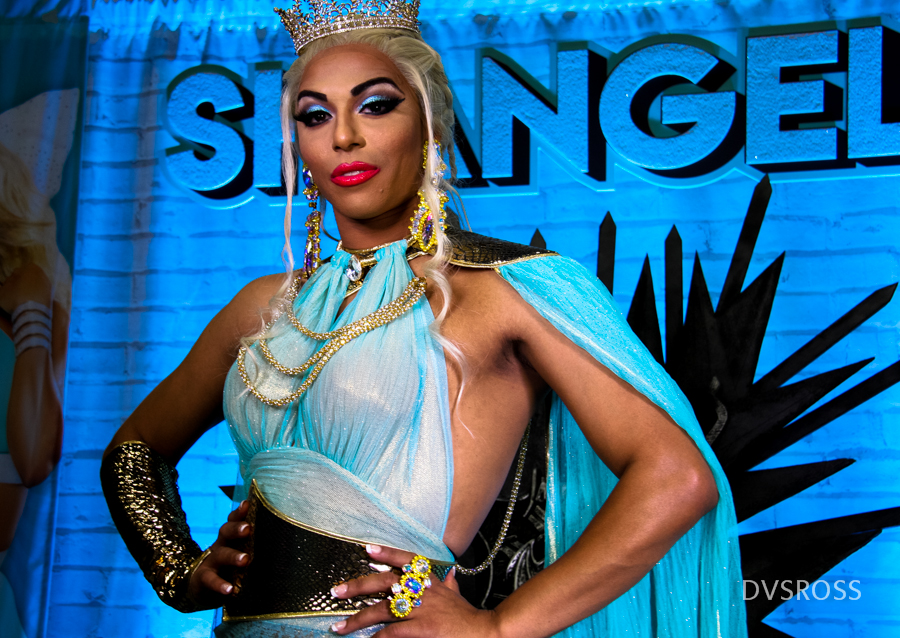
Drag queen Shangela, (pictured in 2018) has an uncredited feature on the third track, "NASA".

The album begins with the song "Imagine", an R&B ballad with a trap-inspired rhythm. The song features multiple whistle notes, and its lyrics speak about Grande's denial of failed relationships, specifically her relationship with Mac Miller. The next track "Needy" is a mid-tempo minimalistic song with a metronome-like synth in the foreground. Its lyrics are about Grande's insecurities in relationships. "NASA", named after the U.S. space agency of the same name, is a "bouncy-R&B tune" with "thumping bass and trap drums". The track features a spoken introduction by Shangela, an American drag queen. She says, "One small step for woman, one giant leap for womankind", a variation on Neil Armstrong's quote, "That's one small step for a man, one giant leap for mankind." The fourth track is "Bloodline." It is a reggae-pop song with R&B influences that contains brassy horns and a pounding bass. It has been compared to Grande's 2016 single "Side to Side" and "Greedy" from her third studio album, Dangerous Woman. The song features a sound bite from Marjorie Grande, Grande's grandmother, in which she is talking about a hearing aid. The Guardian wrote that the song "posits the idea that maybe it's best to just see how things go relationship-wise and getting engaged after a few months isn't essential", believing that this song is about Pete Davidson.

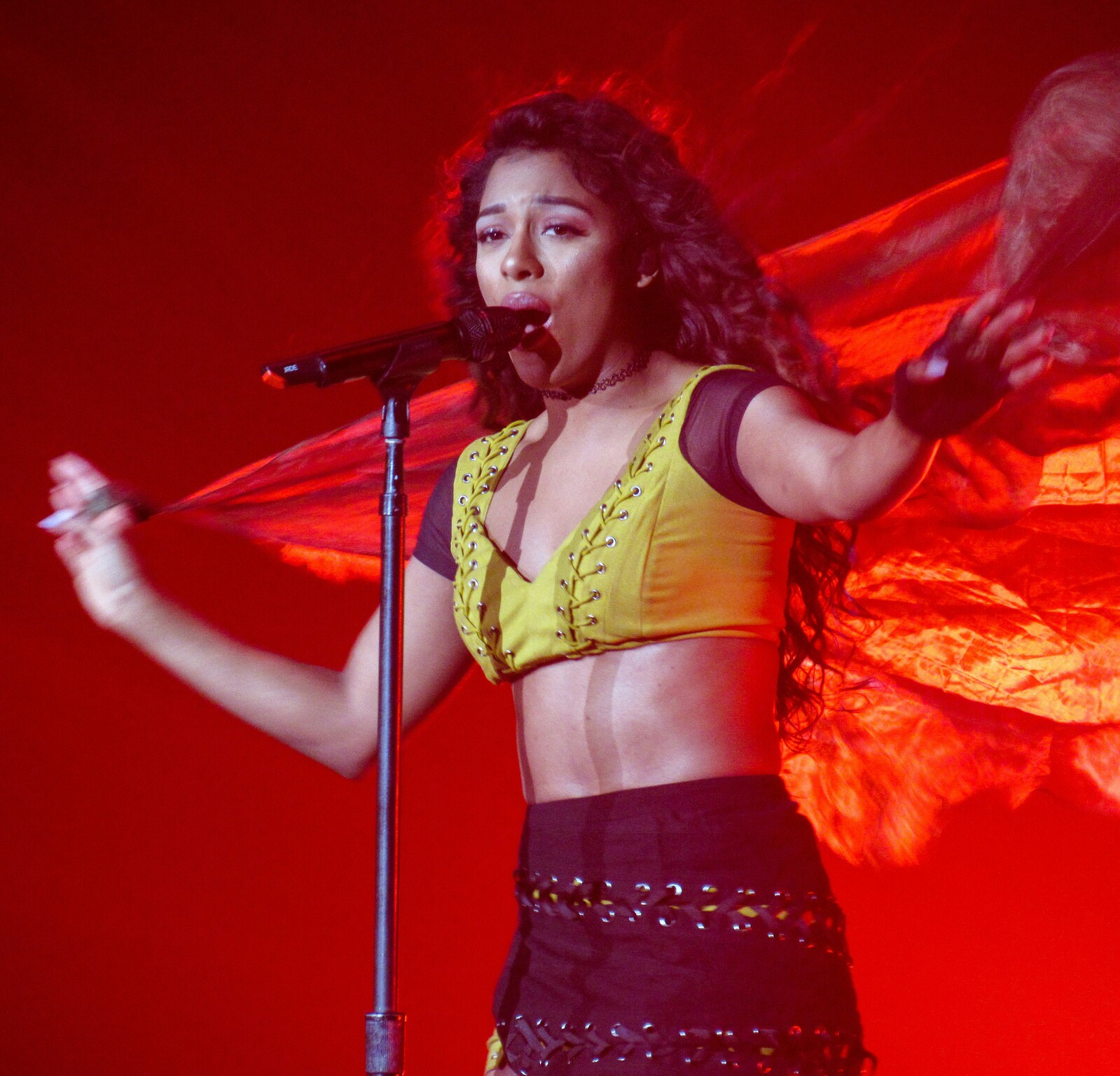
Victoria Monét (pictured in 2017) co-wrote most of the songs on the album.

The fifth track off the album is "Fake Smile", a hip hop soul-inspired track with a trap groove. Lyrically, the song is about the attack on her concert in Manchester and the death of ex-boyfriend Mac Miller, and the emotional toll that these events inflicted upon her. "Bad Idea" is an EDM and trap number, beginning with an 80's rock-ballad intro that garnered comparison to David Guetta's 2012 hit single "Titanium" featuring Sia. With an orchestra throughout the bridge and outro, its lyrics are about Grande's desire to numb her pain. The seventh track "Make Up" is Grande's most sexually explicit song on the album, featuring many double entendres. It is a trap record with wonky pop and bubblegum influences and it contains a "rap-influenced bridge". "Ghostin", the eighth track, is an emotional art pop synth-and-strings ballad. Lyrically, it discusses Grande's last two relationships, stating that "she should ghost the guy that still makes her cry and wants to stop hurting the person she is with now while he is being patient with her," being Miller and Davidson. Savan Kotecha, who co-wrote the song with Grande, told Rolling Stone of working on the track: "[When we were writing] 'Ghostin,' we were in New York... The song speaks for itself in terms of what it's about. We were with her for a week in New York witnessing that, witnessing her feelings on that." According to Grande, she "begged" her manager, Scooter Braun, to remove the track from the album, but he convinced her to keep it.

The ninth track "In My Head" begins with an excerpt of a voicemail from by Grande's close friend Doug Middlebrook. It is a trap-pop hybrid with many R&B influences. "7 Rings", the tenth track, is a trap-pop and R&B song. It features a heavy bass and sees Grande discuss "how global success has allowed her to enjoy the finer things". Billboard magazine noted it's "the most hip-hop-leaning song Grande has released in the post-Sweetener era yet, with Grande almost rapping the song's verses". The album's lead single, "Thank U, Next" is the eleventh track on the album. A self-empowerment pop and R&B song with elements of synth-pop, its lyrics discuss many of Grande's past relationships. Grande explained in an interview that "thank u, next..." is a phrase that she and fellow singer/songwriter Victoria Monét use. The final track "Break Up with Your Girlfriend, I'm Bored" is a trap-pop and R&B song. It was said to be Grande's most eye-catching song from the album. The track replaced "Remember", a song previously planned to be on the album, but was too personal for Grande to release. It samples "It Makes Me Ill" by NSYNC in the bridge.

== Release and promotion ==
Thank U, Next was released worldwide on February 8, 2019, by Republic Records, five months and 22 days after Sweetener, which was released on August 17, 2018. On releasing the album so soon after her previous offering, Grande said she dreamed of putting out music like a rapper does and break "certain standards that pop women are held to that men aren't." Tired of previous release strategies used for her records, she explained: "'Bruh, I just want to fucking talk to my fans and sing and write music and drop it the way these boys do. Why do they get to make records like that and I don't?' So I do and I did and I am, and I will continue to."

The album cover art, shot by Alfredo Flores, shows Grande laying upside-down on the floor with the album title painted on her neck. The digital edition cover features a pink border, whilst the physical edition features a black border.

=== Tour ===
On October 25, 2018, Grande officially announced the Sweetener World Tour, in promotion of both Thank U, Next and Sweetener. The tour began on March 18, 2019, and concluded on December 22, 2019. Normani and Social House were opening acts for the first leg of the tour.

=== Singles ===
The title track was released as the lead single from the album on November 3, 2018, without prior announcements. Commercially, the single was a massive success, peaking at number-one of the charts of 12 countries and breaking a string of records. The song also became Grande's first number-one single on the US Billboard Hot 100. She performed the song on The Ellen DeGeneres Show on November 7. Its accompanying music video was released on November 30, which broke the records for both the most-watched music video in YouTube within 24 hours and the fastest Vevo video to reach 100 million views on YouTube. The song spawned an Internet meme, inspired by the lyrics "One taught me love/one taught me patience / one taught me pain". In a similar fashion, it has also been used as a slogan.

"7 Rings" was released as the second single on January 18, 2019. The track was also commercially successful, peaking atop the charts of 15 countries, including the US, debuting atop of the Billboard Hot 100, making Grande the third female artist to have two or more songs debuting at the top slot of the Hot 100. This also made Grande the third artist in history to have an album with two songs that debuted at number one on the Hot 100, after Drake's Scorpion in 2018 and Mariah Carey's Daydream in 1995. It received generally mixed reviews from music critics, and was the center of plagiarism accusations from multiple artists. "7 Rings" was also nominated for Record of the Year and Best Pop Solo Performance at the 62nd Annual Grammy Awards.

"Break Up with Your Girlfriend, I'm Bored" was released as the third single on February 8, 2019, the same day the album came out. The song debuted atop of the charts in Ireland and the United Kingdom. In the latter, Grande became the first female artist to replace herself at number one on the chart, and joined only three other artists in having three chart-topping singles in under 100 days. As the track became her fifth number-one single in Ireland, Grande now also holds the record for the most number ones in the 2010s decade on the chart, alongside Rihanna. "Break Up with Your Girlfriend, I'm Bored" debuted at number two on the Billboard Hot 100, becoming Grande's 13th top ten single on the chart. With this single at number two, "7 Rings" at number one and "Thank U, Next" at number three, Grande became the first artist to hold the top three on the chart since the Beatles in 1964.

"Imagine" was released as the album's only promotional single on December 14, 2018. Grande performed the song on The Tonight Show Starring Jimmy Fallon on December 18.

== Critical reception ==
Professional ratings
Aggregate scores
Source	Rating
AnyDecentMusic?	8.1/10
Metacritic	86/100
Review scores
Source	Rating
AllMusic	4.5/5 stars
The A.V. Club	A−
Consequence Of Sound	A−
Entertainment Weekly	B+
The Guardian	4/5 stars
The Independent	4/5 stars
The Irish Times	5/5 stars
NME	4/5 stars
Pitchfork	7.9/10
Rolling Stone	4/5 stars

Upon release, Thank U, Next received widespread acclaim from music critics. At Metacritic, which assigns a normalized rating out of 100 to reviews from mainstream critics, the album has an average score of 86 based on 24 reviews, indicating "universal acclaim"; it is the highest Metascore for any of Grande's albums.

Rob Sheffield of Rolling Stone stated that Thank U, Next is "one of the year's best pop albums so far, even in a 2019 that's already turning out to be a great one for new music. Thank U, Next makes you suspect that the best Ariana is yet to come." Ross Horton from The Line of Best Fit praised both the songwriting and production of the album, stating that it is an "airtight, dense pop record with an obnoxiously brash production" and commenting that "even the most delicate, sensual things here are tightly compressed and scrubbed of anything resembling acoustics." AllMusic's Stephen Thomas Erlewine also gave the album a positive review, commenting that "Grande is swaggering with [...] confidence" and concluding that the album "embodies every aspect of Ariana Grande, the grand pop star." Mikael Wood of the Los Angeles Times said, "Thank U, Next flaunts Grande's emotional healing; it's suffused with the joy of discovering that what didn't kill her really did make her stronger."

Michael Cragg of The Guardian commented that Thank U, Next seems to be a "result of a burst of creativity and a prevailing mood", yet criticized "7 Rings" as a "braggadocious, ice-cold low point" of the album. He concluded positively, stating that Grande is a "pop star [...] finally working out who they are and what they want to say" and compared the album to Rihanna's Anti. Helen Brown from The Independent stated that Grande is "embracing her inner mean girl (on the sexy "Break Up with Your Girlfriend, I'm Bored") [and] owning her flaws and contradictions" on tracks such as "Needy" and "NASA", yet concluded that the album lacks enough "vocal grit". Sal Cinquemani from Slant Magazine awarded the album three-and-a-half stars out of five, believing that the album "is easily Grande's most sonically consistent effort to date". He criticized that "some of the [...] tracks tend to blur together", but ultimately concluded in saying that Grande's "refusal to fake a smile that proves to be what makes her so damn likeable." In a capsule review for Vice, Robert Christgau gave the album a three-star honorable mention and summed it up as Grande's "maturing from multitracked studio trickeration to straight love songs—love songs an old grouch might complain are all too superstar-specific"; the title track and "Ghostin'" were cited as highlights.

For two years in a row, Grande's albums topped a Billboard list of the best albums of the year: Sweetener in 2018 and Thank U, Next in 2019. Billboard complimented Grande's liberation to guilt, emotional restraint and independence, they said "in the aftermath of her personal struggles from that year, she found solace in the studio, sipping champagne with her friends and collaborators, while writing and recording the best album of her career in just two weeks". The source later declared it the eighth best album of the 2010s. It was also the best album of the year for Rolling Stone. MTV, also placing it among the top-ten best 2019 albums, stated that the album "unpacks love, lust, and pain in a metallic pop coating. It's cooler, weirder, and deeper than Sweetener, and manages to make that project look shockingly surface-level". In 2025, Rolling Stone included Thank U, Next on its list of "The 250 Greatest Albums of the 21st Century So Far".

Year-end and decade-end lists
Publication	YE	DE
BBC	8	—N/a
Billboard	1	8
Complex	3	—N/a
Consequence of Sound	—N/a	97
The Guardian	16	—N/a
The Independent	42	—N/a
The New York Times	11	—N/a
NME	30	—N/a
Pitchfork	29	—N/a
Rolling Stone	1	30
Uproxx	—N/a	48

== Awards and nominations ==
Awards and nominations for Thank U, Next
Year	Organization	Award	Result	Ref.
2019	People's Choice Awards	Album of 2019	Nominated	
2019	American Music Awards	Favorite Pop/Rock Album	Nominated	
2019	LOS40 Music Awards	Best International Album	Nominated	
2020	Grammy Awards	Album of the Year	Nominated	
2020	Grammy Awards	Best Pop Vocal Album	Nominated	
2020	Juno Awards	International Album of the Year	Nominated	
2020	Billboard Music Awards	Top Billboard 200 Album	Nominated	

== Commercial performance ==
=== United States ===
Thank U, Next debuted at number-one on the US Billboard 200 chart, earning 360,000 album-equivalent units in its opening week, of which 116,000 came from pure sales. It was Grande's fourth number one album, and second in less than six months; marking the shortest gap between number one albums for a woman at the time since Olivia Newton-John's If You Love Me, Let Me Know (1974) and Have You Ever Been Mellow (1975). Its opening week figure of 360,000 was also the largest for a pop album since Taylor Swift's Reputation (2017). Thank U, Next's tracks collected a total of 307 million on-demand audio streams in its first week, representing the largest US streaming week ever for a female artist and pop album. Overall, it earned the eighth-largest streaming debut ever in the US. Billboard also noted that of the 20 largest album streaming weeks at the time, Thank U, Next was the only non-hip hop title present.

On the Billboard Hot 100 chart, issue dated February 20, all 12 songs from Thank U, Next appeared simultaneously; eleven of those songs appeared in the top 40, breaking the record for the most simultaneous top 40 entries by a female artist. The following week, issue dated February 27, all 12 of the album's tracks remained on the chart for a second consecutive week. In its second week, the album remained atop the chart, earning an additional 151,000 units, consisting of 20,000 pure album sales, becoming Grande's first album to spend multiple weeks at number one. It earned 168.6 million on-demand streams in its second week, marking (at the time) the third-largest streaming week ever by a woman, and the second-largest for a pop album, behind its own first week figure.

Thank U, Next was 2019's second-best-performing album on the Billboard 200 chart. It spent a total of 171 weeks on the chart, becoming Grande's longest-running album. Combining singles sales and streaming, Thank U, Next sold 2.056 million units throughout 2019, and was certified double platinum by the Recording Industry Association of America (RIAA) for exceeding two million units in the US in June 2020. As of June 2020, the album has sold 302,000 pure sales in the country.

=== Worldwide ===
In the United Kingdom, Thank U, Next debuted at number one on the UK Albums Chart with 65,000 album-equivalent units. The album became Grande's third number-one on the chart and marked her largest album opening week to date there. Earning 59 million streams, Thank U, Next set a new record for most album streams ever by a female artist in a week in the country, beating her previous album, Sweetener. It spent two additional weeks at number one in the UK. Following its release, "Break Up with Your Girlfriend, I'm Bored" debuted at number one on the UK Singles Chart, replacing "7 Rings", with the latter returning to number one the following week, making Grande the first female solo artist since Madonna in 1985 to simultaneously hold the number one and two spots on the UK Singles Chart and the first musical artist to replace herself twice consecutively at number one in UK chart history. Also, "Needy" peaked at number eight on the chart. Thank U, Next also was 2019's third fastest-selling download by a female artist in the UK, behind Taylor Swift's Lover and Pink's Hurts 2B Human.

In Canada, Thank U, Next debuted at number one on the Billboard Canadian Albums chart with 33,000 total consumption units, marking Grande's third number one in the country. It also scored the largest streaming week by a female artist in the country at the time (29 million audio streams). The album remained atop the chart for three weeks, and became the country's third-most-streamed album of 2019. Additionally, all 12 of the album's tracks charted on the Canadian Hot 100 simultaneously, for two consecutive weeks.

In Ireland, Thank U, Next also became Grande's third number one on the Irish Albums Chart, selling nearly 5,389 units, more than the rest of the top five combined (according to Official Charts Company). Upon its release, Thank U, Next became the only female album of the 2010s decade to feature three Irish number-one singles. Following the album's success, Sweetener (2018) arose three places to number eight, and Dangerous Woman (2016) re-entered the top 50 at number 43. In Australia, Thank U, Next debuted at number one on the Australian Albums Chart, becoming Grande's fourth number one in the territory. All 12 album tracks also appeared on the ARIA Singles Chart.

Thank U, Next has sold more than one million pure copies worldwide. It was the eighth best-selling album of 2019 globally and ranked fourth among female artists.

== Track listing ==
Thank U, Next track listing
No.	Title	Writer(s)	Producer(s)	Length
1.	"Imagine"	Ariana Grande; Andrew Wansel; Nathan Perez; Priscilla Renea; Jameel Roberts	Pop Wansel; Happy Perez	3:32
2.	"Needy"	Grande; Victoria Monét; Tayla Parx; Tommy Brown	Brown	2:51
3.	"NASA"	Grande; Monét; Parx; Brown; Charles Anderson	Brown; Anderson	3:02
4.	"Bloodline"	Grande; Max Martin; Ilya Salmanzadeh; Savan Kotecha	Martin; Ilya	3:36
5.	"Fake Smile"	Grande; Wansel; Perez; Renea; Kennedi Lykken; Justin Tranter; Joseph W. Frierson; Mary Lou Frierson	Pop Wansel; Happy Perez	3:28
6.	"Bad Idea"	Grande; Martin; Salmanzadeh; Kotecha	Martin; Ilya	4:27
7.	"Make Up"	Grande; Monét; Parx; Brown; Brian Baptiste	Brown; Baptiste	2:20
8.	"Ghostin"	Grande; Monét; Parx; Martin; Salmanzadeh; Kotecha	Martin; Ilya	4:31
9.	"In My Head"	Grande; Wansel; Perez; Brittany "Chi" Coney; Denisia Andrews; Lindel Deon Nelson, Jr.; Roberts	Pop Wansel; Happy Perez; Nova Wav^{[a]}	3:42
10.	"7 Rings"	Grande; Monét; Parx; Brown; Anderson; Michael Foster; Njomza Vitia; Kimberly Krysiuk; Richard Rodgers; Oscar Hammerstein II	Brown; Anderson; Foster	2:58
11.	"Thank U, Next"	Grande; Monét; Parx; Brown; Anderson; Foster; Vitia; Krysiuk	Brown; Anderson; Foster	3:27
12.	"Break Up with Your Girlfriend, I'm Bored"	Grande; Martin; Salmanzadeh; Kotecha; Kandi Burruss; Kevin Briggs	Martin; Ilya	3:10
Total length:				41:11

=== Notes ===
- ^{^[a]} signifies a co-producer.
- All tracks except "NASA" are stylized in all lowercase.
- Japanese deluxe edition includes the remix of "7 Rings" featuring 2 Chainz and the standalone single "Monopoly" with Victoria Monét, as well as the music videos of "Thank U, Next", "7 Rings", and "Break Up with Your Girlfriend, I'm Bored".

=== Sample credits ===
- "Fake Smile" contains a sample of "After Laughter (Comes Tears)" performed by Wendy Rene, written by Joseph W. Frierson and Mary Lou Frierson.
- "7 Rings" interpolates portions of "My Favorite Things", written by Oscar Hammerstein II and Richard Rodgers.
- "Break Up with Your Girlfriend, I'm Bored" contains an interpolation of "It Makes Me Ill" by NSYNC.

== Personnel ==
Credits adapted from Tidal and the album's liner notes.

=== Vocals ===
- Ariana Grande – primary artist
- Victoria Monét – background vocals (tracks 2–3, 7–8, 10–11)
- Tayla Parx – background vocals (tracks 2–3, 7, 10)
- Shangela Laquifa Wadley – uncredited vocals (track 3)
- Marjorie Grande – background vocals (track 4)
- Doug Middlebrook – background vocals (track 9)

=== Instrumentation ===
- Happy Perez – guitar (tracks 1, 5, 9), keyboards (tracks 1, 5, 9)
- Pop Wansel – keyboards (tracks 1, 5, 9)
- Peter Lee Johnson – strings (track 2)
- Wojtek Bylund – alto saxophone (track 4)
- Ilya Salmanzadeh – bass (tracks 4, 6, 8, 12), drums (tracks 4, 6, 12), guitar (tracks 4, 6, 8), keyboards (tracks 4, 6, 8, 12), string arrangement (track 6)
- Janne Bjerger – trumpet (track 4)
- Max Martin – bass (tracks 4, 6, 8, 12), drums (tracks 4, 6, 12), guitar (tracks 4, 6, 8), keyboards (tracks 4, 6, 8, 12), string arrangement (track 6)
- Mattias Bylund – horns arrangement (track 4), strings (tracks 6, 8), string arrangement (track 6), violin (track 6)
- Magnus Johannson – trumpet (track 4)
- Peter Noos Johannson – trombone (track 4)
- Tomas Jonnson (Jonsson)– tenor saxophone (track 4)
- JProof – keyboards (tracks 5, 9)
- David Bukovinszky – cello (tracks 6, 8)
- Alexander West – guitar (track 7)
- Larrance Dopson – guitar (track 7)
- Mattias Johansson – violin (track 8)

=== Production ===
- Ariana Grande – executive production, vocal production (all tracks), musical arranger (track 11)
- Scooter Braun – executive production
- Happy Perez – production (tracks 1, 5, 9)
- Pop Wansel – production (tracks 1, 5, 9)
- Tommy Brown – production (tracks 2–3, 7, 10–11)
- Charles Anderson – production (tracks 3, 10–11)
- Max Martin – production (tracks 4, 6, 8, 12), vocal production (track 8)
- Ilya Salmanzadeh – production (tracks 4, 6, 8, 12), vocal production (track 8)
- Brian Baptiste – production (track 7)
- Michael Foster – production (tracks 10–11)
- Victoria Monét – vocal production (tracks 2–3, 7–8, 10–11)
- Tayla Parx – vocal production (tracks 2, 7)
- Nova Wav – co-production (track 9)
- Andrew Luftman – production coordination (tracks 1, 5, 9)
- Sarah Shelton – production coordination (tracks 1, 5, 9)
- Zvi Edelman – production coordination (tracks 1, 5, 9)

=== Technical ===
- Happy Perez – programming (tracks 1, 5, 9)
- Pop Wansel – programming (tracks 1, 5, 9)
- Tommy Brown – programming (tracks 2–3, 10)
- Charles Anderson – programming (tracks 3, 10)
- Ilya Salmanzadeh – programming (tracks 4, 6, 8, 12)
- Max Martin – programming (tracks 4, 6, 8, 12)
- Michael Foster – programming (track 10)
- John Hanes – mixing (tracks 1–3, 10), mixing assistance (tracks 4–9, 11–12)
- Serban Ghenea – mixing (all tracks)
- Billy Hickey – engineering (tracks 2, 3, 7, 10, 11)
- Sam Holland – engineering (tracks 6, 8)
- Brendan Morawski – recording (track 1), engineering (tracks 2, 3, 5, 7–11)
- Joe Gallagher – recording (track 1), engineering (tracks 5, 9)
- Sean Klein – recording assistance (tracks 1–3, 5, 7–8, 10, 11), remix engineering assistance (track 9)
- Jeremy Lertola – recording assistance (tracks 4, 6, 8, 12)
- Cory Bice – recording assistance (tracks 4, 6, 8, 12)

=== Artwork ===
- Jessica Severn – art direction and design
- Brian "kid orange" Nicholson – Neck tag/graffiti artwork
- Alfredo Flores – photography

== Charts ==
=== Weekly charts ===
Weekly chart performance
Chart (2019–2025)	Peak position
Argentine Albums (CAPIF)	1
Australian Albums (ARIA)	1
Austrian Albums (Ö3 Austria)	1
Belgian Albums (Ultratop Flanders)	1
Belgian Albums (Ultratop Wallonia)	3
Canadian Albums (Billboard)	1
Croatian International Albums (HDU)	2
Czech Albums (ČNS IFPI)	1
Danish Albums (Hitlisten)	1
Estonian Albums (Eesti Tipp-40)	1
Dutch Albums (Album Top 100)	2
Finnish Albums (Suomen virallinen lista)	2
French Albums (SNEP)	3
German Albums (Offizielle Top 100)	3
Greek Albums (IFPI)	6
Hungarian Albums (MAHASZ)	11
Icelandic Albums (Tónlistinn)	2
Irish Albums (IRMA)	1
Italian Albums (FIMI)	2
Japan Hot Albums (Billboard Japan)	10
Japanese Albums (Oricon)	12
Latvian Albums (LAIPA)	1
Lithuanian Albums (AGATA)	1
Mexican Albums (AMPROFON)	1
New Zealand Albums (RMNZ)	1
Norwegian Albums (VG-lista)	1
Polish Albums (ZPAV)	3
Portuguese Albums (AFP)	2
Scottish Albums (Official Charts)	1
Slovak Albums (ČNS IFPI)	2
South Korean Albums (Gaon)	30
Spanish Albums (Promusicae)	3
Swedish Albums (Sverigetopplistan)	1
Swiss Albums (Schweizer Hitparade)	2
UK Albums (Official Charts)	1
US Billboard 200	1

=== Monthly charts ===
Monthly chart performance
Chart (2019)	Position
Czech Albums (ČNS IFPI)	2
Japanese International Albums (Oricon)	5
Slovak Albums (ČNS IFPI)	2
South Korean Albums (Gaon)	83

=== Year-end charts ===
Year-end chart performance
Chart (2019)	Position
Australian Albums (ARIA)	7
Austrian Albums (Ö3 Austria)	40
Belgian Albums (Ultratop Flanders)	11
Belgian Albums (Ultratop Wallonia)	46
Canadian Albums (Billboard)	3
Danish Albums (Hitlisten)	13
Dutch Albums (Album Top 100)	11
French Albums (SNEP)	59
German Albums (Offizielle Top 100)	80
Icelandic Albums (Tónlistinn)	8
Irish Albums (IRMA)	6
Italian Albums (FIMI)	59
Latvian Albums (LAIPA)	3
Mexican Albums (AMPROFON)	5
New Zealand Albums (RMNZ)	3
Norwegian Albums (VG-lista)	6
Polish Albums (ZPAV)	60
Spanish Albums (PROMUSICAE)	44
Swedish Albums (Sverigetopplistan)	10
Swiss Albums (Schweizer Hitparade)	43
UK Albums (OCC)	7
US Billboard 200	2
Worldwide (IFPI)	8

Year-end chart performance
Chart (2020)	Position
Australian Albums (ARIA)	68
Belgian Albums (Ultratop Flanders)	74
Belgian Albums (Ultratop Wallonia)	158
Danish Albums (Hitlisten)	84
Dutch Albums (Album Top 100)	80
French Albums (SNEP)	187
Irish Albums (IRMA)	40
Mexican Albums (AMPROFON)	50
New Zealand Albums (RMNZ)	37
UK Albums (OCC)	74
US Billboard 200	57

Year-end chart performance
Chart (2021)	Position
Belgian Albums (Ultratop Flanders)	151
Polish Albums (ZPAV)	31
Spanish Albums (PROMUSICAE)	99
US Billboard 200	92

Year-end chart performance
Chart (2022)	Position
Polish Albums (ZPAV)	91

=== Decade-end charts ===
Decade-end chart performance
Chart (2010–2019)	Position
US Billboard 200	68

== Certifications and sales ==
Certifications and sales
Region	Certification	Certified units/sales
Australia (ARIA)	Platinum	70,000^{‡}
Austria (IFPI Austria)	Platinum	15,000^{‡}
Belgium (BRMA)	Gold	10,000^{‡}
Brazil (Pro-Música Brasil)	Diamond	160,000^{‡}
Canada (Music Canada)	4× Platinum	320,000^{‡}
Denmark (IFPI Danmark)	2× Platinum	40,000^{‡}
Finland (Musiikkituottajat)	2× Platinum	40,000
France (SNEP)	2× Platinum	200,000^{‡}
Germany (BVMI)	Gold	100,000^{‡}
Italy (FIMI)	Platinum	50,000^{‡}
Mexico (AMPROFON)	Platinum	60,000^{‡}
New Zealand (RMNZ)	4× Platinum	60,000^{‡}
Norway (IFPI Norway)	4× Platinum	80,000^{‡}
Poland (ZPAV)	4× Platinum	80,000^{‡}
Portugal (AFP)	Gold	3,500^{‡}
Singapore (RIAS)	2× Platinum	20,000^{*}
Spain (Promusicae)	Gold	20,000^{‡}
Sweden (GLF)	Platinum	30,000^{‡}
Switzerland (IFPI Switzerland)	4× Platinum	80,000^{‡}
United Kingdom (BPI)	2× Platinum	600,000^{‡}
United States (RIAA)	2× Platinum	2,000,000^{‡}
^{*} Sales figures based on certification alone.^{‡} Sales+streaming figures based on certification alone.

== Release history ==
Release dates and formats
Region	Date	Version	Format(s)	Label	Ref.
Various	February 8, 2019	Standard	Cassette; CD; digital download; streaming	Republic	
Various	May 10, 2019	Standard	LP	Republic	
Japan	June 26, 2019	Deluxe	CD; DVD	Universal	

== See also ==
- List of Billboard 200 number-one albums of 2019
- List of number-one albums of 2019 (Australia)
- List of number-one hits of 2019 (Austria)
- List of number-one albums of 2019 (Belgium)
- List of number-one albums of 2019 (Canada)
- List of number-one albums from the 2010s (Denmark)
- List of number-one albums of 2019 (Ireland)
- List of number-one albums of 2019 (Mexico)
- List of number-one albums from the 2010s (New Zealand)
- List of number-one albums in Norway
- List of number-one albums of 2019 (Scotland)
- List of number-one albums of 2019 (Sweden)
- List of UK Albums Chart number ones of the 2010s
- List of UK Album Downloads Chart number ones of the 2010s
