= Sweetener World Tour =

2019 concert tour by Ariana Grande

- Tour by Ariana Grande
- Promotional poster
- Location: Europe; North America
- Associated albums: Sweetener; Thank U, Next
- Start date: March 18, 2019
- End date: December 22, 2019
- Legs: 3
- No. of shows: 100
- Supporting acts: Ella Mai; Normani; Social House
- Attendance: 1.3 million
- Box office: $146.6 million ($184.61 million in 2025 dollars)

Ariana Grande concert chronology
- The Sweetener Sessions (2018); Sweetener World Tour (2019); The Eternal Sunshine Tour (2026)

The Sweetener World Tour was the fourth concert tour and third arena tour by American singer Ariana Grande, in support of her fourth and fifth studio albums, Sweetener (2018) and Thank U, Next (2019). Led by Live Nation Entertainment, the tour was officially announced on October 25, 2018. It began on March 18, 2019, at the Times Union Center in Albany, New York, and concluded on December 22, 2019, in Inglewood, California at The Forum, visiting cities in North America and Europe throughout 97 dates. Frequent collaborators and backup dancers of Grande, Brian and Scott Nicholson served as creative directors and LeRoy Bennett was enlisted as production designer.

The tour received positive reviews from critics, who complimented the stage design and Grande's vocals. The Sweetener World Tour was attended by 1.3 million people and grossed $146.6 million from 97 shows, surpassing her previous concert tour, the Dangerous Woman Tour, as her highest-grossing tour to date. Throughout the tour, Grande partnered with nonprofit organization HeadCount to register new voters ahead of the 2020 United States presidential election, breaking its all-time voter registration record with 33,381 registrations.

Multiple shows across the tour were recorded for the live album K Bye for Now (SWT Live), which was released on December 23, 2019, a day after the final show in Inglewood, California. A concert film documenting the tour entitled Ariana Grande: Excuse Me, I Love You was released to Netflix on December 21, 2020.

== Background ==
On May 6, 2018, Grande finally hinted a tour via her official Twitter account, shortly after announcing the title for her upcoming album on The Tonight Show Starring Jimmy Fallon. Three months later, she announced that there were plans for a tour, stating that her team were "workin [sic] on it all now". Grande embarked on a promotional concert tour for Sweetener, the Sweetener Sessions, which began on August 20, 2018, in New York City and ended on September 4, 2018, in London, United Kingdom. Tour passes were also made available via her official website shortly after. Grande announced the title of the tour as the "Sweetener World Tour" on October 24, 2018, announcing its North American dates a day later.

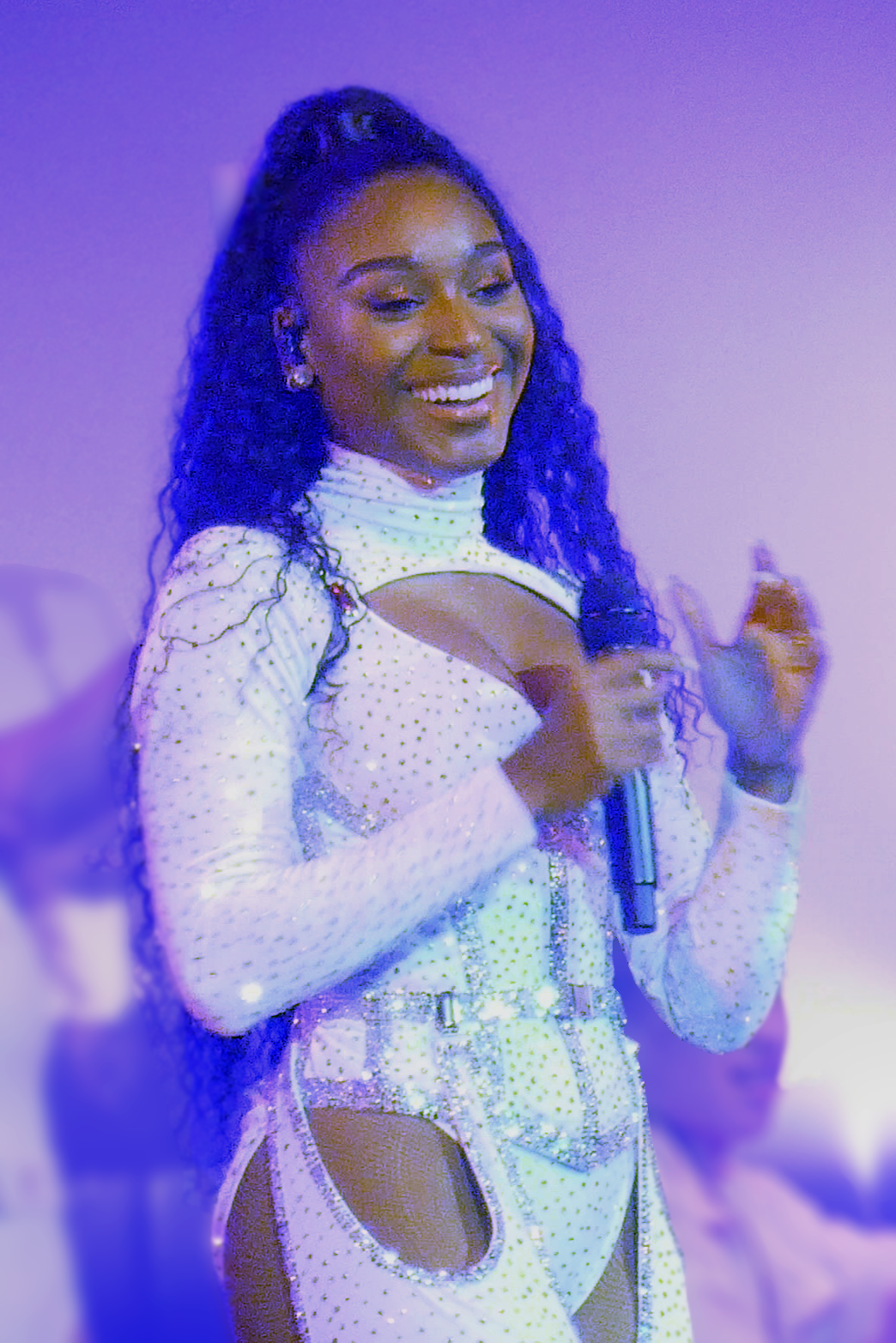
Opening act Normani, 2019

The first leg of the tour had 50 shows across North America and visited 45 cities, beginning on March 18, 2019, in Albany and concluding on August 4, 2019, at Lollapalooza. Pre-sale for the tickets for the first leg of the tour took place between November 1 and November 3, 2018. On November 5, 2018, tickets were opened to the general public, and Grande announced Normani and Social House as her opening acts. On December 10, 2018, due to popular demand, second shows were added in Chicago, Los Angeles, Miami, Brooklyn, New York City, Washington, D.C., Boston, Philadelphia, and Toronto. On January 14, 2019, the shows in Chicago, Indianapolis, Columbus, Milwaukee, St. Louis, Saint Paul, Denver and Salt Lake City were rescheduled and the shows in Omaha and Raleigh were cancelled due to Grande headlining the Coachella Valley Music and Arts Festival on April 14 and April 21, 2019, and a new show was added in Las Vegas. On May 28, 2019, the shows in Tampa and Orlando were cancelled and rescheduled due to illness.

On December 14, 2018, Grande announced the European dates for the tour. A special show was being planned in Manchester. The second leg of the tour had 30 shows and visited 19 cities across Europe, beginning on August 17, 2019, in London, and concluding on October 16, 2019, in London. Pre-sale for the tickets for the second leg of the tour took place between December 19 and December 21, 2018, for the UK, and between December 18 and December 20, 2018, for all other dates. On December 20, 2018, tickets were opened to the general public (excluding the UK), and due to popular demand, additional shows were added in Amsterdam, Paris and Dublin. On December 21, 2018, tickets were opened to the general public in the UK, and due to popular demand, additional shows were added in London and Birmingham. On February 25, 2019, due to popular demand, additional shows were added in Hamburg and Dublin. On March 5, 2019, Grande announced that Ella Mai would be the opening act for the European leg of the tour. On June 11, 2019, due to popular demand, additional shows were added in London. On August 9, 2019, the first show in Hamburg and the show in Prague were rescheduled, and the show in Kraków was cancelled.

On June 20, 2019, Grande announced another North American leg of the tour. The third leg of the tour visited 18 cities and had 20 shows across the United States, including the rescheduled Tampa and Orlando shows, beginning on November 9, 2019, in Uniondale and concluding on December 22, 2019, in Inglewood. Pre-sale for the tickets for the third leg of the tour took place between June 26 and June 30, 2019. On July 1, 2019, tickets were opened to the general public. On July 11, 2019, due to popular and high demand, additional shows were added in San Francisco and Inglewood.

Grande announced she would be partnering with nonprofit voter registration group HeadCount to register new voters ahead of the 2020 presidential election in March via Instagram. She encouraged fans to "use your voice and get your 'thank u, next gen' sticker." In July, it was reported that HeadCount registered twice as many voters in partnership with Grande than any other tour over the last three years and that the Sweetener World Tour was the most successful artist tour for voter registration HeadCount has seen since 2008. In December, it was announced that the tour broke the organization's all-time record, with 33,381 voter registrations and actions.

== Stage and aesthetic ==
Grande wore costumes from Versace and Michael Ngo on stage. She enlisted Brian and Scott Nicholson as creative directors, LeRoy Bennett as production designer, and Jason Baeri as lighting director. Designed based on the idea of a sphere, the tour stage was intended to deliver an abstract and "ethereal" aesthetic. It included a semicircular runway that looped around an audience pit, a large screen at the back with a hemisphere-like projection, and a large orb—nicknamed "the moon" by fans and Grande herself—that descended briefly as Grande sang on the B-stage in the middle of the pit. The moon and the projection screen were both inflatable, requiring a set-up period of six to eight hours, although Grande's team assembled everything in 45 minutes for her Coachella set. Bennett likened the show's feel more to a play than to a pop show: "Usually you are trying to appropriately match the energy of a song with action and accent to tell a story along with the music and lyrics; the language of this show was different in that we were striving to create static tableaus and grand gestures as an environment for her to play in front of, much like a unit set in a play." The stage was produced and rehearsed at Rock Lititz.

== Concert synopsis ==
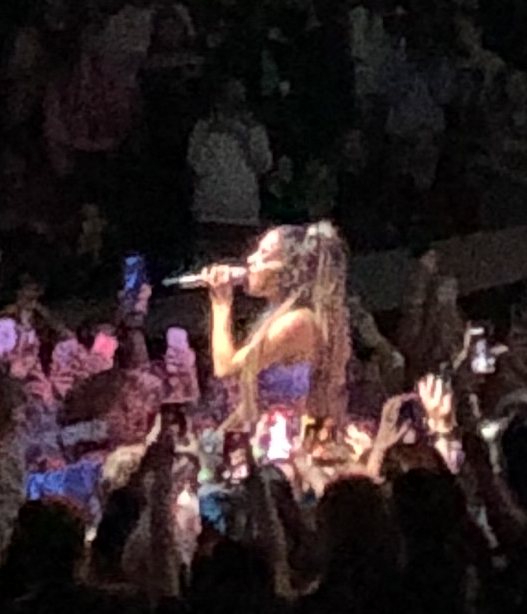
Grande performing at the first Washington, D.C. show on March 25, 2019

Before the show begins, a video is shown on the screen with a cascading movement of clouds that faintly flashes, as well as planets spinning on the video screens attached to the stage. Once the visual ends and the houselights are turned off, it transitions into another visual where two of the planets merge into one planet, forming a ball on the middle part of the stage. As this is happening, Grande opens the show by singing the acapella song "Raindrops (An Angel Cried)". After this, she and her dancers rise up from the stage while Grande sings "God Is a Woman" in a performance similar to her 2018 MTV Video Music Awards performance. The prop used for the performance is a table inspired by the famous painting The Last Supper. It is made of three parts and is used for the entirety of act 1. After that, she welcomes the audience of the city she's in and performs "Bad Idea", followed by "Break Up with Your Girlfriend, I'm Bored" in which she and her dancers enact a chair dance. Grande then exits the stage for a costume change as an interlude plays, showing a video of a child-aged Grande reenacting a scene from the 2003 film Bruce Almighty. This interlude is called "Childhood" by fans.

The second act of the show begins with Grande singing "R.E.M." as visuals of pink and yellow are shown on screen. What follows is a short video interlude from a scene taken from the 1996 film The First Wives Club that transitions into a performance of "Be Alright" where Grande and her dancers perform in front of a pink backdrop and pink aesthetics.

== Critical reception ==
The tour received generally positive reviews from critics. Brittany Spanos from Rolling Stone gave the opening night at Albany a positive review, stating that "Grande's new world tour is full of emotional drama, iconic looks, and undeniable hits." Chris Richards of the Washington Post praised her vocals stating that "Grande's voice is equal parts breathy and acrobatic, and she knows how to hit a big note like she's whispering it". Chris Willman of Variety called the show "giddy, splendorous, beautifully designed, expertly performed and almost a little bit avant-garde in its staging."

Regarding the second leg of the tour in Europe, Adam White of The Telegraph gave the show full five stars, stating that the show was "a night of magic and melancholy from the most exciting young star in pop". In a four-star review, Hannah Mylrea of NME noted that "the production was fairly understated, putting the full focus on her impressive vocals, but there were moments of impressive choreography". In a mixed review, Alexis Petridis of The Guardian praised Grande's vocal performance but felt that she lacked stage presence, also noting that the production was underwhelming. Ed Potton of The Times rated the show two out of five stars, attributing it to "underwhelming" staging, production, and Grande's "robotic" persona.

Grande's headlining performance at the 2019 Coachella Valley Music and Arts Festival was praised by critics. Shad Powers of USA Today stated that "Grande closed out Weekend One of Coachella in style, putting together a set that included special guests, stunning visuals, and of course her undeniable voice." Rhian Daly of NME called her set "a breathtaking moment of light in a dark world". Ben Beaumont-Thomas of The Guardian stated that "with her headline set surveying her entire career, [Grande's] work forms a fascinating, still-unfolding pop Bildungsroman: every sexual epiphany and personal milestone sketched out in real time, resulting in a uniquely involving opus." Claire Shaffer from Rolling Stone stated that "Grande gave a star-studded headlining performance", naming NSYNC's guest appearance as one of the best moments of the 2019 Coachella. Suzy Exposito continued, "Grande became one of the boys that night, claiming Timberlake's verses from the center stage and whipping her lustrous, anime pony like a boss." Lyndsey Havens of Billboard called Grande's set "epic" and stated that she "continues to rewrite the rule book for pop stardom and admittedly fosters a new relationship with herself."

== Commercial performance ==
The Sweetener World Tour grossed over $146.4 million with 1.3 million tickets sold. It surpassed her previous tour, the Dangerous Woman Tour (which grossed $71.1m) as her highest grossing and biggest tour to date. The tour grossed $106.9 million in the U.S. and Canada and $39.5 million in Europe. Overall, Grande's total tour figures extend to $243.5 million with 2.7 million tickets sold from 229 shows. Due to high demand, second shows were added in Boston, Washington D.C., Philadelphia, Toronto, Los Angeles, Phoenix, Dallas, Miami, Chicago, Atlanta, Nashville, Brooklyn (another show would be added later on), New York City, London (4 more shows were added later on), Amsterdam (another show would be added), Paris, Birmingham, Hamburg, Dublin (two more shows would be added), San Francisco, and Inglewood.

== Set list ==
=== North America (Leg 1) ===
This set list is representative of the Albany concert on March 18, 2019. It does not represent all concerts for the duration of the tour.

Act I

1. "Raindrops (An Angel Cried)"
2. "God Is a Woman"
3. "Bad Idea"
4. "Break Up with Your Girlfriend, I'm Bored"

Act II

5. "Childhood" (video interlude)
6. "R.E.M."
7. "Be Alright"
8. "Sweetener" / "Successful"
9. "Side to Side"
10. "Bloodline"
11. "7 Rings"

Act III

12. "Close to You" (interlude) (a cover)
13. "Love Me Harder" / "Breathin"
14. "Needy"
15. "Fake Smile"
16. "Make Up"
17. "Right There" / "You'll Never Know" / "Break Your Heart Right Back"
18. "NASA"
19. "Goodnight n Go"

Act IV

20. "In My Head" (interlude)
21. "Everytime"
22. "One Last Time"
23. "The Light Is Coming"
24. "Into You"

Act V

25. "My Heart Belongs to Daddy" (interlude) (a cover)
26. "Dangerous Woman"
27. "Break Free"
28. "No Tears Left to Cry"

Encore

29. "Thank U, Next"

=== Europe ===
This set list is representative of the London concert on August 17, 2019. It does not represent all concerts for the duration of the tour.

Act I

1. "Raindrops (An Angel Cried)"
2. "God Is a Woman"
3. "Bad Idea"
4. "Break Up with Your Girlfriend, I'm Bored"

Act II

5. "Childhood" (video interlude)
6. "R.E.M."
7. "Be Alright"
8. "Sweetener" / "Successful"
9. "Side to Side"
10. "7 Rings"

Act III

11. "Adore" (interlude)
12. "Love Me Harder" / "Breathin"
13. "Needy"
14. "Fake Smile"
15. "Make Up"
16. "Right There" / "You'll Never Know" / "Break Your Heart Right Back"
17. "NASA"
18. "Only 1"

Act IV

19. "In My Head" (interlude)
20. "Boyfriend" (with Social House)
21. "Everytime"
22. "The Light Is Coming"
23. "Into You"

Act V

24. "My Heart Belongs to Daddy" (interlude) (a cover)
25. "Dangerous Woman"
26. "Break Free"
27. "No Tears Left to Cry"

Encore

28. "Thank U, Next"

=== North America (Leg 2) ===
This set list is representative of the Brooklyn concert on November 12, 2019. It does not represent all concerts for the duration of the tour.

Act I

1. "Raindrops (An Angel Cried)"
2. "God Is a Woman"
3. "Bad Idea"
4. "Break Up with Your Girlfriend, I'm Bored"

Act II

5. "Childhood" (video interlude)
6. "R.E.M."
7. "Be Alright"
8. "Sweetener" / "Successful"
9. "Side to Side"
10. "7 Rings"

Act III

11. "Adore" (interlude)
12. "Breathin"
13. "Needy"
14. "Fake Smile"
15. "Make Up"
16. "December" / "True Love" / "Wit It This Christmas"/ "Winter Things" / "Santa Tell Me"
17. "NASA"
18. "Tattooed Heart"

Act IV

19. "In My Head" (interlude)
20. "Everytime"
21. "The Light Is Coming"
22. "Into You"

Act V

23. "My Heart Belongs to Daddy" (interlude) (a cover)
24. "Dangerous Woman"
25. "Break Free"
26. "No Tears Left to Cry"

Encore

27. "Thank U, Next"

=== Notes ===
- During both shows in Indio, "Successful", "Bloodline", "Fake Smile", "Make Up", "You'll Never Know", "Everytime", and "One Last Time" were not performed.
- During the second show in Indio, Grande performed "Bang Bang".
- Starting on April 14, "One Last Time" was removed from the set list for personal reasons.
- Starting on May 14, "Goodnight n Go" was replaced with "Get Well Soon".
- During the show in Charlotte, Grande performed "Tattooed Heart" and "Piano".
- Starting on June 21, "Bloodline" was removed from the set list.
- On August 4, "Raindrops (An Angel Cried)", "Successful", "Love Me Harder", "Fake Smile", "Make Up", "Right There", "You'll Never Know", "Break Your Heart Right Back", and "Everytime" were not performed.
- Starting on August 4, the "Close to You" interlude was replaced with "Adore".
- "Boyfriend" was only performed from August 4 to September 3.
- Starting on October 3, "Only 1" was replaced with "Tattooed Heart".
- During the show in Uniondale, "Into You" was not performed.
- "Winter Things" was performed in Uniondale, Charlottesville, and the third show in Atlanta.
- During the second show in Atlanta, "Successful", "Everytime" and "Break Free" were not performed.
- Starting on November 22, "Break Free" was removed from the set list.
- During the second show in Dallas, Grande performed "Moonlight" after "NASA".
- Starting with the show in Anaheim, "Get Well Soon" was removed from the set list and replaced with "Honeymoon Avenue".

=== Special guests ===
- March 20: Grande performed "Rule the World" with 2 Chainz.
- March 25: Grande performed "Got Her Own" with Victoria Monét.
- April 1, May 7, May 10―11, and December 13: "Monopoly" with Victoria Monét.
- April 14: "Break Up with Your Girlfriend, I'm Bored" and "Tearin' Up My Heart" with NSYNC, "Side to Side" and "Bang Bang" with Nicki Minaj, and "Mo Money Mo Problems" with Diddy and Mase.
- April 21: "Sorry" with Justin Bieber.
- November 19: "I Think You're Swell" with Matt Bennett and "Give It Up" with Elizabeth Gillies.

== Shows ==
List of concerts, showing date, city, country, venue, opening acts, tickets sold, number of available tickets and gross revenue
Date (2019)	City	Country	Venue	Opening acts	Attendance (tickets sold / available)	Revenue
March 18	Albany	United States	Times Union Center	Normani; Social House	11,432 / 11,432	$1,268,045
March 20	Boston	United States	TD Garden	Normani; Social House	13,125 / 13,125	$1,670,045
March 22	Buffalo	United States	KeyBank Center	Normani; Social House	14,459 / 14,459	$1,470,630
March 25	Washington, D.C.	United States	Capital One Arena	Normani; Social House	13,598 / 13,598	$1,832,776
March 26	Philadelphia	United States	Wells Fargo Center	Normani; Social House	14,787 / 14,787	$1,799,863
March 28	Cleveland	United States	Quicken Loans Arena	Normani; Social House	14,763 / 14,763	$1,554,750
March 30	Uncasville	United States	Mohegan Sun Arena	Normani; Social House	7,097 / 7,097	$1,112,692
April 1	Montreal	Canada	Bell Centre	Normani; Social House	14,620 / 15,643	$1,440,460
April 3	Toronto	Canada	Scotiabank Arena	Normani; Social House	14,663 / 14,663	$1,565,703
April 5	Detroit	United States	Little Caesars Arena	Normani; Social House	13,698 / 13,698	$1,508,715
April 14 (Note: The concerts on April 14 and April 21, 2019, at the Empire Polo Club in Indio are part of the Coachella Valley Music and Arts Festival.)	Indio	United States	Empire Polo Club	—N/a	110,000 / 110,000	—N/a
April 21	Indio	United States	Empire Polo Club	—N/a	110,000 / 110,000	—N/a
April 25	Edmonton	Canada	Rogers Place	Normani; Social House	13,947 / 13,947	$1,493,948
April 27	Vancouver	Canada	Rogers Arena	Normani; Social House	14,363 / 14,363	$1,617,978
April 30	Portland	United States	Moda Center	Normani; Social House	13,692 / 13,692	$1,469,277
May 2	San Jose	United States	SAP Center	Normani; Social House	13,605 / 13,605	$1,730,098
May 3	Sacramento	United States	Golden 1 Center	Normani; Social House	13,886 / 13,886	$1,737,905
May 6	Los Angeles	United States	Staples Center	Normani; Social House	27,916 / 27,916	$3,277,659
May 7	Los Angeles	United States	Staples Center	Normani; Social House	27,916 / 27,916	$3,277,659
May 10	Inglewood (Note: Promoted as Los Angeles.)	United States	The Forum	Normani; Social House	14,417 / 14,417	$2,149,419
May 11	Paradise (Note: Promoted as Las Vegas.)	United States	T-Mobile Arena	Normani; Social House	15,194 / 15,194	$1,555,349
May 14	Phoenix	United States	Talking Stick Resort Arena	Normani; Social House	13,343 / 13,343	$1,492,678
May 17	San Antonio	United States	AT&T Center	Normani; Social House	14,860 / 14,860	$1,678,465
May 19	Houston	United States	Toyota Center	Normani; Social House	12,483 / 12,483	$1,602,420
May 21	Dallas	United States	American Airlines Center	Normani; Social House	14,262 / 14,262	$1,601,901
May 23	Oklahoma City	United States	Chesapeake Energy Arena	Normani; Social House	12,668 / 12,668	$1,347,629
May 25	New Orleans	United States	Smoothie King Center	Normani; Social House	12,889 / 12,889	$1,376,994
May 31	Miami	United States	American Airlines Arena	Normani; Social House	26,704 / 26,704	$3,146,471
June 1	Miami	United States	American Airlines Arena	Normani; Social House	26,704 / 26,704	$3,146,471
June 4 (Note: The concerts on June 4 and June 5, 2019, at United Center in Chicago were originally scheduled to take place on April 7 and April 8, 2019, but were rescheduled due to Grande headlining the Coachella Valley Music and Arts Festival.)	Chicago	United States	United Center	Normani; Social House	28,941 / 28,941	$3,468,667
June 5	Chicago	United States	United Center	Normani; Social House	28,941 / 28,941	$3,468,667
June 7	Nashville	United States	Bridgestone Arena	Normani; Social House	13,835 / 13,835	$1,437,761
June 8	Atlanta	United States	State Farm Arena	Normani; Social House	12,317 / 12,317	$1,220,686
June 10	Charlotte	United States	Spectrum Center	Normani; Social House	14,972 / 14,972	$1,550,790
June 12	Pittsburgh	United States	PPG Paints Arena	Social House (Note: Following doctor's orders, Normani was unable to perform at the Pittsburgh show.)	14,343 / 14,343	$1,518,932
June 14	New York City (Note: The locations for the concerts on June 14, 15, and November 12, 2019, were promoted as Brooklyn.)	United States	Barclays Center	Normani; Social House	28,972 / 28,972	$4,378,453
June 15	New York City	United States	Barclays Center	Normani; Social House	28,972 / 28,972	$4,378,453
June 18	New York City	United States	Madison Square Garden	Normani; Social House	28,576 / 28,576	$5,492,909
June 19	New York City	United States	Madison Square Garden	Normani; Social House	28,576 / 28,576	$5,492,909
June 21	Washington, D.C.	United States	Capital One Arena	Normani; Social House	13,897 / 13,897	$1,782,835
June 22	Boston	United States	TD Garden	Normani; Social House	13,242 / 13,242	$1,628,077
June 24	Philadelphia	United States	Wells Fargo Center	Normani; Social House	14,968 / 14,968	$1,807,505
June 26	Toronto	Canada	Scotiabank Arena	Normani; Social House	15,073 / 15,073	$1,539,282
June 29 (Note: The concert on June 29, 2019, at Bankers Life Fieldhouse in Indianapolis was originally scheduled to take place on April 12, 2019, but was rescheduled due to Grande headlining the Coachella Valley Music and Arts Festival.)	Indianapolis	United States	Bankers Life Fieldhouse	Normani; Social House	13,773 / 13,773	$1,346,335
July 1 (Note: The concert on July 1, 2019, at the Schottenstein Center in Columbus was originally scheduled to take place on April 10, 2019, but was rescheduled due to Grande headlining the Coachella Valley Music and Arts Festival.)	Columbus	United States	Schottenstein Center	Normani; Social House	13,576 / 13,576	$1,361,839
July 5 (Note: The concert on July 5, 2019, at Fiserv Forum in Milwaukee was originally scheduled to take place on April 15, 2019, but was rescheduled due to Grande headlining the Coachella Valley Music and Arts Festival.)	Milwaukee	United States	Fiserv Forum	Normani; Social House	12,040 / 12,040	$1,310,830
July 6 (Note: The concert on July 6, 2019, at Enterprise Center in St. Louis was originally scheduled to take place on April 13, 2019, but was rescheduled due to Grande headlining the Coachella Valley Music and Arts Festival.)	St. Louis	United States	Enterprise Center	Normani; Social House	14,474 / 14,474	$1,547,186
July 8 (Note: The concert on July 8, 2019, at Xcel Energy Center in Saint Paul was originally scheduled to take place on April 17, 2019, but was rescheduled due to Grande headlining the Coachella Valley Music and Arts Festival.)	Saint Paul	United States	Xcel Energy Center	Normani; Social House	14,789 / 14,789	$1,751,076
July 11 (Note: The concert on July 11, 2019, at Pepsi Center in Denver was originally scheduled to take place on April 20, 2019, but was rescheduled due to Grande headlining the Coachella Valley Music and Arts Festival.)	Denver	United States	Pepsi Center	Normani; Social House	13,258 / 13,258	$1,446,520
July 13 (Note: The concert on July 13, 2019, at Vivint Smart Home Arena in Salt Lake City was originally scheduled to take place on April 22, 2019, but was rescheduled due to Grande headlining the Coachella Valley Music and Arts Festival.)	Salt Lake City	United States	Vivint Smart Home Arena	Normani; Social House	12,569 / 12,569	$1,163,364
August 4 (Note: The concert on August 4, 2019, at Grant Park in Chicago is part of Lollapalooza.)	Chicago	United States	Grant Park	—N/a	—N/a	—N/a
August 17	London	England	The O_{2} Arena	Ella Mai; Social House	49,950 / 51,426	$5,313,530
August 19	London	England	The O_{2} Arena	Ella Mai; Social House	49,950 / 51,426	$5,313,530
August 20	London	England	The O_{2} Arena	Ella Mai; Social House	49,950 / 51,426	$5,313,530
August 23	Amsterdam	Netherlands	Ziggo Dome	Ella Mai; Social House	32,407 / 32,407	$2,423,340
August 24	Amsterdam	Netherlands	Ziggo Dome	Ella Mai; Social House	32,407 / 32,407	$2,423,340
August 27	Paris	France	AccorHotels Arena	Ella Mai; Social House	31,521 / 32,520	$2,649,344
August 28	Paris	France	AccorHotels Arena	Ella Mai; Social House	31,521 / 32,520	$2,649,344
August 30	Antwerp	Belgium	Sportpaleis	Ella Mai; Social House	20,720 / 21,826	$1,366,100
September 1	Cologne	Germany	Lanxess Arena	Ella Mai; Social House	15,928 / 15,928	$1,460,540
September 3	Vienna	Austria	Wiener Stadthalle	Ella Mai; Social House	15,090 / 15,090	$1,597,690
September 4 (Note: The concert on September 4, 2019, at O_{2} Arena in Prague was originally scheduled to take place on September 8, but was rescheduled.)	Prague	Czech Republic	O_{2} Arena	Ella Mai; Social House	13,624 / 13,624	$1,258,644
September 11	Amsterdam	Netherlands	Ziggo Dome	Ella Mai; Social House	15,844 / 15,844	$1,238,670
September 14	Birmingham	England	Arena Birmingham	Ella Mai; Social House	26,704 / 27,810	$2,774,610
September 15	Birmingham	England	Arena Birmingham	Ella Mai; Social House	26,704 / 27,810	$2,774,610
September 17	Glasgow	Scotland	SSE Hydro	Ella Mai; Social House	12,994 / 12,994	$1,342,620
September 19	Sheffield	England	FlyDSA Arena	Ella Mai; Social House	10,764 / 10,764	$832,363
September 22	Dublin	Ireland	3Arena	Ella Mai; Social House	37,905 / 37,905	$3,688,950
September 23	Dublin	Ireland	3Arena	Ella Mai; Social House	37,905 / 37,905	$3,688,950
September 25	Dublin	Ireland	3Arena	Ella Mai; Social House	37,905 / 37,905	$3,688,950
September 28	Hamburg	Germany	Barclaycard Arena	Ella Mai; Social House	12,614 / 13,377	$1,142,830
October 1	Copenhagen	Denmark	Royal Arena	Ella Mai; Social House	15,473 / 15,473	$1,264,240
October 3	Fornebu (Note: Promoted as Oslo.)	Norway	Telenor Arena	Ella Mai; Social House	23,911 / 23,911	$1,816,140
October 5	Helsinki	Finland	Hartwall Arena	Ella Mai; Social House	11,547 / 11,547	$1,353,560
October 7	Stockholm	Sweden	Ericsson Globe	Ella Mai; Social House	13,831 / 13,831	$1,264,240
October 9 (Note: The concert on October 9, 2019, at Barclaycard Arena in Hamburg was originally scheduled to take place on September 5, but was rescheduled.)	Hamburg	Germany	Barclaycard Arena	Ella Mai; Social House	11,553 / 11,553	$1,088,470
October 10	Berlin	Germany	Mercedes-Benz Arena	Ella Mai; Social House	13,531 / 13,531	$1,216,250
October 13	Zürich	Switzerland	Hallenstadion	Ella Mai; Social House	13,370 / 13,370	$1,367,790
October 15	London	England	The O_{2} Arena	Ella Mai; Social House	26,369 / 29,062	$3,061,320
October 16	London	England	The O_{2} Arena	Ella Mai; Social House	26,369 / 29,062	$3,061,320
November 9	Uniondale (Note: Promoted as Nassau.)	United States	Nassau Veterans Memorial Coliseum	Social House	11,464 / 11,464	$1,580,315
November 12	New York City	United States	Barclays Center	Social House	14,151 / 14,151	$1,982,444
November 15	Charlottesville	United States	John Paul Jones Arena	Social House	9,940 / 9,940	$1,102,879
November 19	Atlanta	United States	State Farm Arena	Social House	10,599 / 10,599	$1,121,970
November 22	Raleigh	United States	PNC Arena	Social House	13,041 / 13,041	$1,385,720
November 24 (Note: The concert on November 24, 2019, at Amalie Arena in Tampa was originally scheduled to take place on May 28, 2019, but was rescheduled due to illness.)	Tampa	United States	Amalie Arena	Social House	14,067 / 14,067	$1,430,092
November 25 (Note: The concert on November 25, 2019, at Amway Center in Orlando was originally scheduled to take place on May 29, 2019, but was rescheduled due to illness.)	Orlando	United States	Amway Center	Social House	13,112 / 13,112	$1,431,037
November 27	Miami	United States	American Airlines Arena	Social House	12,100 / 12,100	$1,411,818
December 1	Jacksonville	United States	VyStar Veterans Memorial Arena	Social House	10,560 / 10,560	$965,794
December 3	Columbia	United States	Colonial Life Arena	Social House	11,984 / 11,984	$1,104,939
December 5	Nashville	United States	Bridgestone Arena	Social House	10,471 / 10,471	$1,140,202
December 7	Memphis	United States	FedExForum	Social House	11,826 / 11,826	$1,009,205
December 9	Dallas	United States	American Airlines Center	Social House	13,834 / 13,834	$1,645,800
December 12	Phoenix	United States	Talking Stick Resort Arena	Social House	12,951 / 12,951	$1,465,817
December 13	Anaheim	United States	Honda Center	Social House	12,575 / 12,575	$1,686,682
December 15	Paradise	United States	MGM Grand Garden Arena	Social House	10,377 / 10,377	$1,210,935
December 17	San Francisco	United States	Chase Center	Social House	22,990 / 22,990	$3,065,557
December 18	San Francisco	United States	Chase Center	Social House	22,990 / 22,990	$3,065,557
December 21	Inglewood	United States	The Forum	Social House	25,810 / 25,810	$3,383,378
December 22	Inglewood	United States	The Forum	Social House	25,810 / 25,810	$3,383,378
Total					1,329,061 / 1,336,015 (99.47%)	$145,895,695

=== Cancelled shows ===
List of cancelled concerts, showing date, city, country, venue, reason for cancellation and reference
Date	City	Country	Venue	Reason	Ref.
April 18	Omaha	United States	CHI Health Center Omaha	Schedule changes due to Coachella Valley Music and Arts Festival	
September 9	Kraków	Poland	Tauron Arena	Personal issues	
November 17	Lexington	United States	Rupp Arena	Illness	
