= Break Up with Your Girlfriend, I'm Bored =

2019 single by Ariana Grande

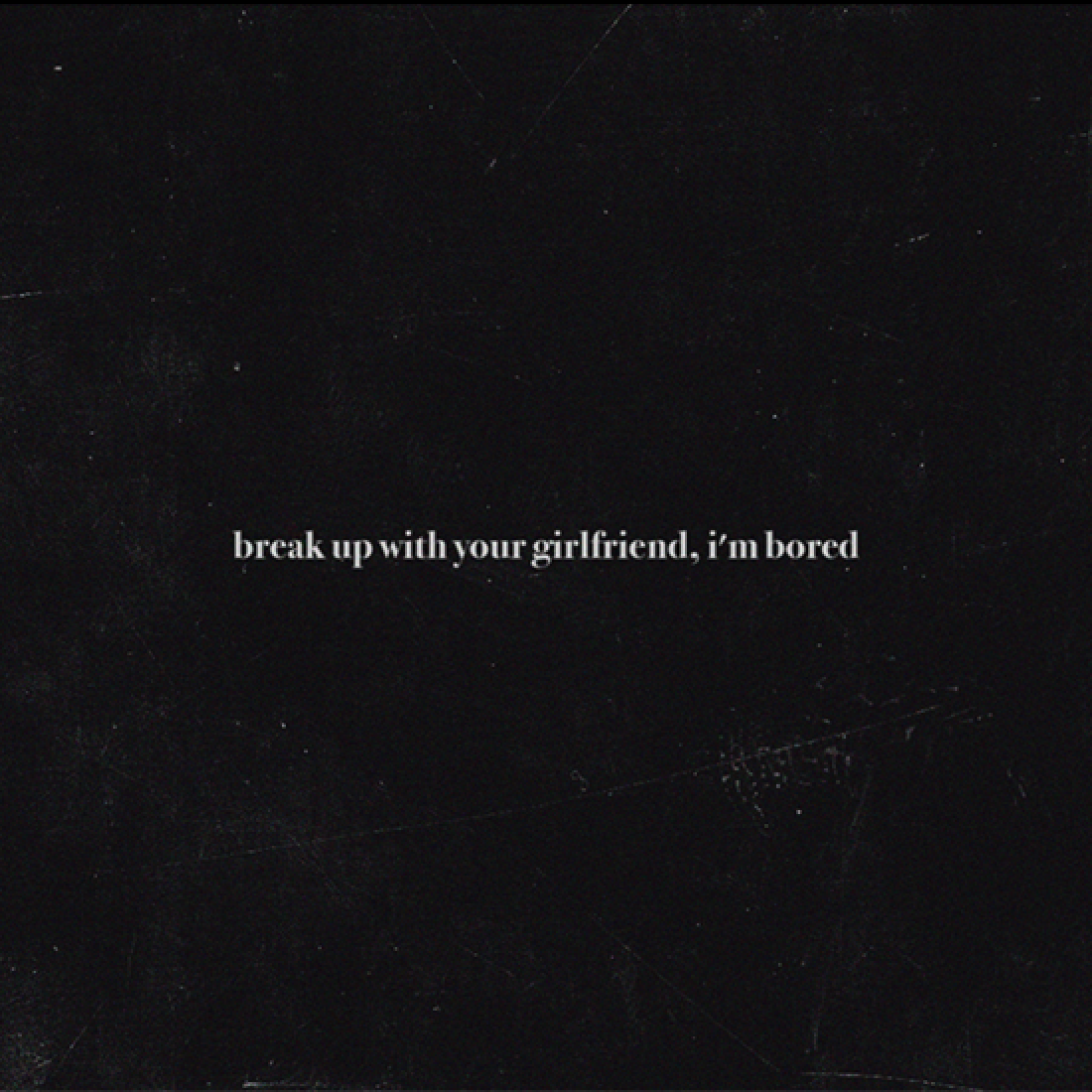

Single by Ariana Grande

from the album Thank U, Next
- Released: February 8, 2019
- Studio: MXM (Los Angeles); Wolf Cousins (Stockholm)
- Genre: Pop-R&B; trap-pop
- Length: 3:10
- Label: Republic
- Songwriters: Ariana Grande; Max Martin; Ilya Salmanzadeh; Savan Kotecha; Kandi Burruss; Kevin Briggs
- Producers: Max Martin; Ilya

Ariana Grande singles chronology
"7 Rings" (2019)	"Break Up with Your Girlfriend, I'm Bored" (2019)	"Rule the World" (2019)

Music video
- "Break Up with Your Girlfriend, I'm Bored" on YouTube

"Break Up with Your Girlfriend, I'm Bored" (stylized in all lowercase) is a song by American singer-songwriter Ariana Grande. It was released on February 8, 2019, by Republic Records as the third and final single from her fifth studio album, Thank U, Next (2019). The song was written by Grande, Savan Kotecha, Kandi Burruss, Kevin Briggs, and the producers Max Martin and Ilya Salmanzadeh. The pop-R&B and trap-pop song consists of an interpolation the NSYNC song "It Makes Me Ill" in the bridge. The lyrics depict Grande convincing a man to break up with his girlfriend.

"Break Up with Your Girlfriend, I'm Bored" debuted and peaked at number two on the Billboard Hot 100, allowing Grande to become the second artist after the Beatles to have songs on the top three positions of the Hot 100 and the first solo and female artist to accomplish this feat. Outside of the United States, "Break Up with Your Girlfriend, I'm Bored" topped the charts in eight countries, including Ireland, New Zealand, and the United Kingdom, and received platinum or higher certifications in 13 countries. An accompanying music video was directed by Hannah Lux Davis and depicts Grande in a love triangle with a couple including a doppelgänger of herself. A scene in the video was compared to Single White Female (1992), while some publications criticized it for queerbaiting. Grande included "Break Up with Your Girlfriend, I'm Bored" on the setlist of the Sweetener World Tour and performed the song with NSYNC on the first show at the 2019 Coachella Valley Music and Arts Festival.

== Background and composition ==
Grande announced the inclusion of "Break Up with Your Girlfriend, I'm Bored" on the Thank U, Next track listing on January 22, 2019. It replaced the initial song "Remember", as she believed that it was too personal to release and wanted a "fun" song instead. Grande additionally uploaded a snippet of the song on her social media accounts prior to its release. It was released as the third and final single from Thank U, Next on February 8, 2019, and was distributed to contemporary hit radio and rhythmic contemporary radio in the United States on February 12, 2019.

Musically, "Break Up with Your Girlfriend, I'm Bored" is a pop-R&B and trap-pop song, which includes Grande's "semi-rapped, disenfranchised" vocals placed over a "booming" bass, and is accompanied by a "subterranean click beat". "Break Up with Your Girlfriend, I'm Bored" contains an interpolation of the NSYNC song "It Makes Me Ill" from their third studio album No Strings Attached (2000), which is heard in the bridge. Grande inherits the cadence and lyrics from "It Makes Me Ill", and changes the lyric in the original song: "You can say I'm crazy, if you want to / That's true, I'm crazy 'bout you" to the lyric in "Break Up with Your Girlfriend, I'm Bored": "You can call me crazy cuz I want you / And I never even never fuckin met you". Billboard staff writers believed that Grande altered the song to become "a hyper-sexualized, alluring and suspenseful paean", while Elias Leight of Rolling Stone noted that the lyrics contrast from the "tale of envy [...] overflow[ing] with jealousy" in "It Makes Me Ill" to the possibility of "escap[ing] dullness" in "Break Up with Your Girlfriend, I'm Bored". "Break Up with Your Girlfriend, I'm Bored" was written by Grande, Max Martin, Ilya Salmanzadeh, Savan Kotecha, and the songwriters of "It Makes Me Ill", Kandi Burruss and Kevin Briggs. The lyrics depict Grande convincing a man to break up with his girlfriend.

== Critical reception ==
Rolling Stone writer Rob Sheffield praised "Break Up with Your Girlfriend, I'm Bored" for being "the perfect way to end Thank U, Next and compared it to the Britney Spears song "Get Naked (I Got a Plan)". Ross Horton of The Line of Best Fit described the song as "positively filthy" and opined that Grande's vocals should contain an "advisory warning". Writing for The Independent, Helen Brown stated that "Break Up with Your Girlfriend, I'm Bored" is "sexy" with Grande "embracing her inner mean girl". The Irish Times writer Ed Powers opined that it is "a sultry exorcism" where Grande searched for "merciful oblivion in the arms of a forbidden lover". At the 2020 Hito Music Awards, "Break Up with Your Girlfriend, I'm Bored" won the award for Best Western Song.

However, Wren Graves of Consequence of Sound believed that the placement of "Break Up with Your Girlfriend, I'm Bored" on Thank U, Next as the final track gave the album "a sour aftertaste". Writing for HotNewHipHop, Devin Ch described the song as a "humorous quip at worst", while Entertainment Weekly writer Maura Johnston claimed that "Break Up with Your Girlfriend, I'm Bored" is "self-indulgent" and negatively compared it to Grande's song "7 Rings" through the character Veruca Salt.

== Commercial performance ==
=== North America ===
In the United States, "Break Up with Your Girlfriend, I'm Bored" debuted at number two on the Billboard Hot 100 behind Grande's "7 Rings", which was her 13th top 10 song on the chart. With "7 Rings", "Break Up with Your Girlfriend, I'm Bored", and "Thank U, Next" simultaneously occupying the top three positions on the Hot 100 chart dated February 23, 2019, Grande became the first artist to monopolize the entire top three positions on the chart since the Beatles did so in 1964, and the first solo and female artist to accomplish this feat. The song remained on the chart for a total of 20 weeks, and was certified triple platinum by the Recording Industry Association of America (RIAA) on June 15, 2020, for sales of over 3,000,000 equivalent units in the United States.

The song debuted on the Billboard Streaming Songs and Digital Songs charts at number two, logging 59.2 million first-week streams and 36,000 digital downloads sold within its first week, respectively. Additionally, on the Dance Club Songs chart dated May 4, 2019, "Break Up with Your Girlfriend, I'm Bored" became Grande's seventh overall number one song and her fourth number one song in 2019, which was assisted with remixes by Dirty Werk, Country Club Martini Crew and Eric Kupper. On the Mainstream Top 40 chart issued May 4, 2019, it peaked at number three and remained for 20 weeks. "Break Up with Your Girlfriend, I'm Bored" ranked at number 21 on The 25 Most-Consumed Songs of 2019 chart compiled by BuzzAngle Music, having sold more than 2,258,795 units. The song debuted at its number two peak behind "7 Rings" on the Canadian Hot 100 chart dated February 23, 2019, and was certified quintuple platinum by Music Canada (MC) on January 12, 2024, for 400,000 track-equivalent sales in the country.

=== Europe and Oceania ===
In the United Kingdom, "Break Up with Your Girlfriend, I'm Bored" debuted at the top of the UK Singles Chart on February 15, 2019, for the week ending date February 21, 2019, with 85,000 combined sales and replaced "7 Rings", which fell a spot to number two that week. Grande became the first female artist to replace herself at number one on the UK Singles Chart and the second female artist to occupy the top two spots on the chart since Madonna in August 1985. She also became the first female artist to achieve three chart-topping singles in under 100 days and the fourth overall artist after Elvis Presley, John Lennon, and Justin Bieber, and was the first female artist with three songs in the top 10 as a lead artist after Ruby Murray in March 1955. The following week, "Break Up with Your Girlfriend, I'm Bored" declined to the number two position, as "7 Rings" regained its number one peak. Grande subsequently became the first artist in British chart history to self-replace for two consecutive weeks. The song received a double platinum certification by the British Phonographic Industry (BPI) on June 13, 2025, for sales of 1,200,000 track-equivalent units in the United Kingdom.

In the Republic of Ireland, the song peaked at the summit of the Irish Singles Chart and became Grande's fifth song to top the chart. The latter achievement allowed Grande to become the second female artist with the most number one songs in the 2010s decade, after Rihanna's previous six songs. Grande was the first person to replace themselves on the chart since Ed Sheeran in 2017, and was the second female artist since Britney Spears to reach four number ones on the chart in less than a year during the 2000s millennium.

In Australia, "Break Up with Your Girlfriend, I'm Bored" debuted at the number two peak on the ARIA Singles Chart dated February 24, 2019, where it remained for 13 weeks. It was eventually certified 4× platinum by the Australian Recording Industry Association (ARIA) in 2023, for selling 280,000 equivalent units in the country.

"Break Up with Your Girlfriend, I'm Bored" topped the New Zealand Singles Chart issued February 18, 2019, and charted for 14 weeks. The song was later certified double platinum by Recorded Music NZ (RMNZ) for selling 60,000 units in the country.

== Music video ==
=== Background ===
An accompanying music video for the song was released at midnight on February 8, 2019, which coincided with the release of the album. It was directed by American music video director Hannah Lux Davis and filmed inside a mansion in the Hollywood Hills. The music video is Davis' third consecutively-directed video from Thank U, Next, after the album's title song and "7 Rings". Davis stated that the video's concept was based around a love triangle between Grande and a couple including a doppelgänger of the former, which Davis described as an "element of narcissism". It features actor Charles Melton and model Ariel Yasmine.

=== Synopsis ===
The video begins with Grande arriving in a nightclub while sporting a platinum wig. She notices Melton and his girlfriend Yasmine, the latter resembles Grande with her "sky-high ponytail". Although Melton is holding Yasmine, he is fixated by Grande's appearance. Grande is next seen at a house party without the platinum wig, as she attempts to gain Melton's affection. Throughout several scenes, Grande and Yasmine intimately dance together and caress the other person's hair, while the former portrays a "third wheel" as she follows the couple while rolling her eyes. Towards the end of the video, Grande advances towards the couple as they are lounging poolside. She approaches Melton, but swiftly pushes him away before turning towards Yasmine as they both lean in to kiss.

=== Reception ===
Billboard staff considered the music video to be "sexy and stylish", while Tallie Spencer of Spin opined that it "complements the song's sassy tone". Writing for MTV News, Madeline Roth considered it to be "trippy" and compared the scene where Grande changes her appearance to the film Single White Female (1992), while Elle writer Alyssa Bailey noted that the music video is portrayed as "a good CW drama". However, some publications accused the video's climax for queerbaiting.

== Live performances and cover version ==
Grande debuted the live performance of "Break Up with Your Girlfriend, I'm Bored" on the Sweetener World Tour on March 19, 2019, where it was the fourth song included on the setlist in Albany, New York. During the performance, Grande enacts a chair dance sequence with her dancers. She performed the song at both shows of the Coachella Valley Music and Arts Festival in 2019. During the first show on April 14, 2019, Grande paused midway through the song to introduce NSYNC members JC Chasez, Chris Kirkpatrick, Joey Fatone, and Lance Bass on stage to sing "It Makes Me Ill" with "intense choreography". They then followed up their performance with NSYNC's 1997 song "Tearin' Up My Heart", with Grande performing the dance moves while the video screens resembled a VHS tape with numbers and ripples. NSYNC's appearance during both performances elicited a loud crowd reaction.

American singer Lana Del Rey performed a cover version of "Break Up with Your Girlfriend, I'm Bored" during her BBC Radio 1 Live Lounge appearance on September 9, 2019, which was approved by Grande on Twitter. Nick Reilly of NME stated that Del Rey's cover "is largely faithful to the original". It was nominated for Best Cover Song on the 2020 iHeartRadio Music Awards.

== Track listing ==
- Limited edition cassette / 7-inch single
1. "Break Up with Your Girlfriend, I'm Bored" (Explicit) – 3:10
2. "Break Up with Your Girlfriend, I'm Bored" (Edited) – 3:10

== Credits and personnel ==
Credits adapted from the album's liner notes.

Recording

- Recorded at MXM Studios (Los Angeles, California; Stockholm, Sweden) and Wolf Cousins Studios (Stockholm)
- Mixed at MixStar Studios (Virginia Beach, Virginia)
- Mastered at Sterling Sound (New York City, New York)

Personnel

- Ariana Grande – vocals, songwriting, vocal producer
- Max Martin – songwriting, producer, bass, drums, keyboards, programming
- Ilya Salmanzadeh – songwriting, production, bass, drums, keyboards, programming
- Savan Kotecha – songwriting
- Kandi Burruss – songwriting
- Kevin Briggs – songwriting
- Sam Holland – engineer
- Jeremy Lertola – assistant engineer
- Cory Bice – assistant engineer
- Serban Ghenea – mixing
- John Hanes – mixing assistant
- Randy Merrill – mastering

== Charts ==
=== Weekly charts ===
Weekly chart performance
Chart (2019)	Peak position
Argentina (Argentina Hot 100)	80
Australia (ARIA)	2
Austria (Ö3 Austria Top 40)	6
Belgium (Ultratop 50 Flanders)	27
Belgium (Ultratop 50 Wallonia)	31
Canada Hot 100 (Billboard)	2
Canada CHR/Top 40 (Billboard)	8
Canada Hot AC (Billboard)	39
China Airplay/FL (Billboard)	50
Czech Republic Singles Digital (ČNS IFPI)	2
Denmark (Tracklisten)	4
Finland (Suomen virallinen lista)	3
France (SNEP)	16
Germany (GfK)	8
Greece International (IFPI)	1
Hungary (Single Top 40)	4
Hungary (Stream Top 40)	2
Iceland (Tónlistinn)	1
Ireland (IRMA)	1
Italy (FIMI)	35
Israel (Media Forest)	1
Latvia (LAIPA)	2
Lithuania (AGATA)	2
Lebanon (Lebanese Top 20)	1
Malaysia (RIM)	2
Netherlands (Single Top 100)	11
New Zealand (Recorded Music NZ)	1
Norway (VG-lista)	4
Portugal (AFP)	2
Romania (Airplay 100)	99
Scottish Singles Sales (Official Charts)	10
Singapore (RIAS)	2
Slovakia Singles Digital (ČNS IFPI)	1
Spain (Promusicae)	21
Sweden (Sverigetopplistan)	6
Switzerland (Schweizer Hitparade)	5
UK Singles (Official Charts)	1
US Billboard Hot 100	2
US Adult Pop Airplay (Billboard)	38
US Dance Club Songs (Billboard)	1
US Dance Airplay (Billboard)	11
US Pop Airplay (Billboard)	3
US Rhythmic Airplay (Billboard)	10
US Rolling Stone Top 100	65

=== Monthly charts ===
Monthly chart performance
Chart (2019)	Peak position
Brazil Streaming (Pro-Música Brasil)	50

=== Year-end charts ===
Year-end chart performance in 2019
Chart (2019)	Position
Australia (ARIA)	44
Canada (Canadian Hot 100)	31
Denmark (Tracklisten)	83
Hungary (Single Top 40)	76
Hungary (Stream Top 40)	41
Iceland (Tónlistinn)	52
Ireland (IRMA)	30
Israel (Galgalatz)	24
Latvia (LAIPA)	63
New Zealand (Recorded Music NZ)	31
Portugal (AFP)	88
UK Singles (Official Charts Company)	33
US Billboard Hot 100	36
US Dance Club Songs (Billboard)	37
US Mainstream Top 40 (Billboard)	20
US Rhythmic (Billboard)	42
US Rolling Stone Top 100	29

== Certifications ==
Certifications and sales
Region	Certification	Certified units/sales
Australia (ARIA)	4× Platinum	280,000^{‡}
Austria (IFPI Austria)	Platinum	30,000^{‡}
Brazil (Pro-Música Brasil)	Diamond	160,000^{‡}
Canada (Music Canada)	5× Platinum	400,000^{‡}
Denmark (IFPI Danmark)	Platinum	90,000^{‡}
France (SNEP)	Platinum	200,000^{‡}
Germany (BVMI)	Gold	200,000^{‡}
Italy (FIMI)	Gold	25,000^{‡}
New Zealand (RMNZ)	3× Platinum	90,000^{‡}
Norway (IFPI Norway)	2× Platinum	120,000^{‡}
Poland (ZPAV)	2× Platinum	40,000^{‡}
Portugal (AFP)	Platinum	10,000^{‡}
Spain (Promusicae)	Gold	30,000^{‡}
Switzerland (IFPI Switzerland)	Gold	10,000^{‡}
United Kingdom (BPI)	2× Platinum	1,200,000^{‡}
United States (RIAA)	5× Platinum	5,000,000^{‡}
Streaming
Sweden (GLF)	Platinum	8,000,000^{†}
^{‡} Sales+streaming figures based on certification alone.^{†} Streaming-only figures based on certification alone.

== Release history ==
Release dates and formats
Region	Date	Format	Label	Ref.
Various	February 8, 2019	Digital download; streaming	Republic	
United States	February 12, 2019	Rhythmic contemporary radio	Republic	
United States	February 12, 2019	Contemporary hit radio	Republic	
Canada	March 27, 2019	Contemporary hit radio	Republic	

== See also ==
- List of Billboard Hot 100 top-ten singles in 2019
- List of Billboard number-one dance songs of 2019
- List of top-ten singles in 2019 (Australia)
- List of number-one singles of 2019 (Ireland)
- List of number-one singles of the 2010s (New Zealand)
- List of UK Singles Chart number ones of the 2010s
