= NASA (song) =

2019 song by Ariana Grande

Song by Ariana Grande

from the album Thank U, Next
- Released: February 8, 2019
- Studio: Jungle City (New York City)
- Length: 3:02
- Label: Republic
- Songwriters: Ariana Grande; Victoria Monét; Tayla Parx; Tommy Brown; Charles Anderson
- Producers: Tommy Brown; Charles Anderson

Audio video
- "NASA" on YouTube

"NASA" is a song by American singer Ariana Grande. It is the third track on her fifth studio album, Thank U, Next (2019), which was released on February 8, 2019, via Republic Records. The song was written by Grande, Victoria Monét, Tayla Parx, and its producers Tommy Brown and Charles Anderson.

Upon release, "NASA" reached the top 20 in Australia, Canada, Malaysia, Singapore and the United States. The song was certified platinum by the Recording Industry Association of America (RIAA) and silver by the British Phonographic Industry (BPI).

== Recording and production ==
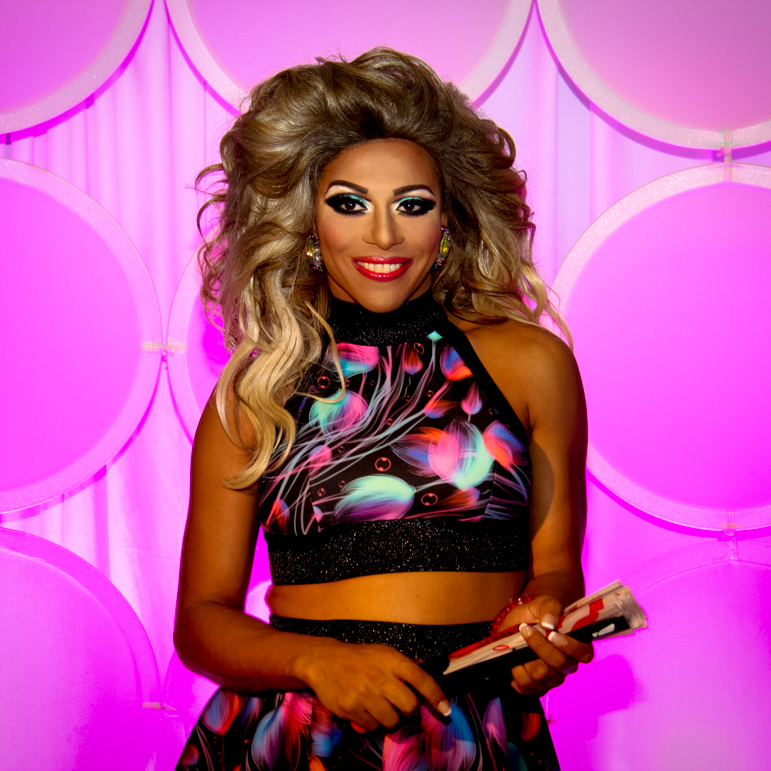
The track features a spoken introduction by Shangela (pictured in 2017).

The song is named after the U.S. space agency of the same name.

"NASA", named after the U.S. space agency of the same name, was written by Ariana Grande, Victoria Monét, Tayla Parx and its producers Tommy Brown and Charles Anderson. Grande's vocals were recorded by at the Jungle City Studios in New York City. Serban Ghenea mixed the track, and Brendan Morawski and Billy Hickey engineered the track assisted by Sean Kline. The track features a spoken introduction by Shangela, an American drag queen. She says, "One small step for woman, one giant leap for womankind", a variation on Neil Armstrong's quote, "That's one small step for a man, one giant leap for mankind." Shangela has said of the origins of her contribution to the track:

The song ['NASA'] was amazing, and when the song ended, she was like, 'What do you think?' And I was like, 'Oh girl, I live! I love it, and it's amazing! I'm already thinking of how I'm going to perform it for my drag number, when I do my version.' And she looked at me said, 'Your version?' And I said, 'I'm just going to put a fun intro on it for drag, and I'm going to be in a spacesuit with like space-Titties and I'm going to come out in a moon man suit and I'm going to lift the mask and say, 'This is one small step for woman, one giant leap for womankind.' And she was like, 'Oh my God! I love that!'

== Critical reception ==
"NASA" received positive reviews from critics, with many noting it as a highlight from the album. The Atlantic's Spencer Kornhaber wrote, "On the top-tier bop 'NASA', which evokes Grande's sonic godmother Mariah Carey without recycling her, she kindly but firmly asks a lover for a night apart." In his review of Thank U, Next, Michael Cragg of The Guardian said of the song, "The springy, joyous NASA, which harks back to her debut, 2013's Yours Truly, takes the theme of planetary exploration and turns it into a plea for space (geddit?)." Carolyn Bernucca of Complex said, "The standout track, 'NASA,' is punctuated by thumping bass and trap drums that have made their way from Atlanta all the way into mainstream pop." Mathew Rodriguez of Out wrote, "On this banger, Ari demands distance from a smothering loved one, but it’s also very much an ode to self-care, something everyone in Grande’s target demographic — everyone — thinks about. The good news is that the verses are killer and succeed at establishing the kind of mood Grande wants to create. That said, the chorus here feels a little mismatched with the rest of the song. It’s not that it’s bad, but the rest of the song is so chill, that her Toni Basil-like repetition of “space” over and over feels a little underwritten."

"NASA" was ranked as one of the best songs of 2019 by several publications. Pitchfork stated that "on an album largely about the joys of being unattached, "NASA" offers a nuance: the freedom to be attached, just not right now. “I can’t really miss you if I’m with you,” Grande offers, gently reminding a lover that intimacy doesn't mean constant proximity. While Grande's refrain of “I’m a star, I’ma need space” verges on cutesy, the delicate harmonies and airy production of “NASA” make its blown-out bass and trap drums feel weightless." Rolling Stone said the song was "a deeply empathetic (and devastatingly catchy) ode to wanting to be alone, and letting absence make hearts grow fonder. The beat, courtesy of producers Tommy Brown and Charles Anderson, is the standout on an album with stiff competition, based around a whistling, underwater-sounding synth. The writing, which took place in a marathon New York recording run, is some of Grande’s sharpest to date. And on top of all that, the song’s basic thesis is correct: If you haven’t listened to it in a while, throw it on right now. You’ll like it even more than you used to." Uproxx ranked 'NASA' at number 18 on their year-end list, saying that "more songs about self-sufficiency within relationships can only be a good thing for Ariana’s young fans, and those of still floundering through codependency issues in our thirties." Stereogum ranked it at number 19 on their Top 40 Pop Songs of 2019 list.

== Commercial performance ==
Following the release of Thank U, Next, "NASA" debuted on at number 17 on the Billboard Hot 100 issue dated February 23, 2019, becoming Grande's 18th top-twenty hit on that chart, the fifth top-twenty entry from the album and her second highest-charting non-single in the United States. Consequently, Thank U, Next became the first female album to have five top-twenty entries on the Hot 100 since Taylor Swift's Reputation the year before.

== Credits and personnel ==
Credits adapted from Tidal.

- Ariana Grande – lead vocals, songwriter, vocal producer
- Victoria Monét – backing vocals, songwriter, vocal producer
- Tayla Parx – backing vocals, songwriter
- Tommy Brown – producer, songwriter, programmer
- Charles Anderson – producer, songwriter, programmer
- Billy Hickey – engineer, studio personnel
- Brendan Morawski – engineer, studio personnel
- John Hanes – mixing engineer, studio personnel
- Serban Ghenea – mixer, studio personnel
- Sean Klein – assistant recording engineer, studio personnel

== Charts ==
Chart performance for "NASA"
Chart (2019)	Peak position
Australia (ARIA)	16
Canada Hot 100 (Billboard)	17
Czech Republic Singles Digital (ČNS IFPI)	39
France (SNEP)	128
Germany (GfK)	69
Greece International (IFPI)	13
Hungary (Stream Top 40)	18
Lithuania (AGATA)	17
Malaysia (RIM)	15
Netherlands (Single Top 100)	46
New Zealand (Recorded Music NZ)	30
Portugal (AFP)	26
Scottish Singles Sales (Official Charts)	42
Singapore (RIAS)	14
Slovakia Singles Digital (ČNS IFPI)	23
Spain (Promusicae)	85
Sweden (Sverigetopplistan)	51
Australia (ARIA)	16
UK Singles Downloads (Official Charts)	55
UK Audio Streaming (Official Charts)	10
US Billboard Hot 100	17

== Certifications ==
Certifications for "NASA"
Region	Certification	Certified units/sales
Australia (ARIA)	Platinum	70,000^{‡}
Brazil (Pro-Música Brasil)	2× Platinum	80,000^{‡}
New Zealand (RMNZ)	Gold	15,000^{‡}
United Kingdom (BPI)	Silver	200,000^{‡}
United States (RIAA)	Platinum	1,000,000^{‡}
^{‡} Sales+streaming figures based on certification alone.
