= Symmetry (song) =

2025 single by Ed Sheeran

Single by Ed Sheeran

from the album Play
- Released: 17 October 2025
- Length: 3:08 (remix); 2:48 (album version)
- Label: Gingerbread Man; Atlantic
- Songwriters: Sheeran; Johnny McDaid; Savan Kotecha; Ilya Salmanzadeh
- Producers: Sheeran; Ilya; McDaid; Kotecha

Ed Sheeran singles chronology
"Camera" (2025)	"Symmetry" (2025)	"Repeat It" (2026)

Karan Aujla singles chronology
"MF Gabhru" (2025)	"Symmetry" (2025)

Music video
- "Symmetry" on YouTube

"Symmetry" is a song by English singer-songwriter Ed Sheeran. It was released on 12 September 2025 by Gingerbread Man and Atlantic Records, as the fifth song from his album Play. It was then released as a single on 17 October 2025. "Symmetry" was written and produced by Sheeran, Johnny McDaid, Savan Kotecha, and Ilya Salmanzadeh. The single version features Indian singer and rapper, Karan Aujla. "Symmetry" topped the UK Asian Music Chart for eight weeks.

== Background ==
The original solo version of "Symmetry" was released on Play, on 12 September 2025. Later, on 17 October 2025, Sheeran released an EP with remixes recorded with Indian artists. Titled Play (The Remixes), it includes new versions of "Symmetry", "Don't Look Down", "Heaven", and previously released remix of "Sapphire". Featured artists include: Karan Aujla, Hanumankind, Dhee, Santhosh Narayanan, Jonita and Arijit Singh.

== Critical reception ==
Alexis Petridis from The Guardian highlighted "Symmetry" while reviewing Sheeran's album, Play. He noted that the song opens with looped Indian percussion and vocals but quickly floats off in a different direction, involving spectral voices and heaving sub-bass. Maya Georgi from the Rolling Stone also praised the "sultry dance-floor number" "Symmetry", which has a "thumping heart that can get anyone dancing".

== Music video ==
The music video for "Symmetry" was directed by Australian video director, Liam Pethick, who previously directed Sheeran's videos for "Azizam" ("Pink Heart" version) and "Sapphire". It was released along with the single on 17 October 2025 and features Sheeran and Karan Aujla performing the song with the Norwegian hip-hop/urban dance group, Quick Style.

== Track listing ==
- Digital and streaming single
1. "Symmetry" (featuring Karan Aujla) (remix) – 3:08
2. "Don't Look Down" (featuring Hanumankind, Dhee, Santhosh Narayanan) (remix) – 4:43
3. "Sapphire" (featuring Arijit Singh) (remix) – 3:00
4. "Heaven" (featuring Jonita) (remix) – 4:02

== Charts ==
Chart (2025–2026)	Peak position
Canada Hot 100 (Billboard)	84
India International (IMI)	17
New Zealand Hot Singles (RMNZ) album version	11
New Zealand Hot Singles (RMNZ) remix	11
Nicaragua Anglo Airplay (Monitor Latino) album version	8
Nicaragua Anglo Airplay (Monitor Latino) remix	2
Suriname (Nationale Top 40)	5
UK Singles (Official Charts)	75
UK Asian Music (OCC)	1

== Release history ==
Region	Date	Format	Version	Label	Ref.
Various	17 October 2025	Digital download; streaming	Remix	Gingerbread Man; Atlantic	
