= A Little More (Ed Sheeran song) =

2025 single by Ed Sheeran

Single by Ed Sheeran

from the album Play
- Released: 7 August 2025
- Length: 3:12
- Label: Gingerbread Man; Atlantic
- Songwriters: Ed Sheeran; Blake Slatkin; Henry Walter; Johnny McDaid; Dave
- Producers: Ed Sheeran; Blake Slatkin; Cirkut

Ed Sheeran singles chronology
"Drive" (2025)	"A Little More" (2025)	"Camera" (2025)

Music video
- "A Little More" on YouTube

"A Little More" is a song by English singer-songwriter Ed Sheeran. It was released on 7 August 2025 by Gingerbread Man and Atlantic Records, as the fourth single from his eighth studio album, Play. "A Little More" was written by Sheeran, Blake Slatkin, Cirkut, Johnny McDaid and Dave, and produced by Sheeran, Slatkin and Cirkut. It reached number nine in Switzerland and number 18 in the United Kingdom. The music video was released along with the single and features Rupert Grint and Nathalie Emmanuel.

== Music video ==
The Emil Nava-directed music video for "A Little More" features English actors: Rupert Grint and Nathalie Emmanuel. Grint reprises his role as Sheeran's stalker from the 2011 "Lego House" music video. He is haunted by the images of Sheeran wherever he goes. The video features over 250 different outfit changes. It was shot in Suffolk, England where Sheeran was raised.

== Track listing ==
- Digital and streaming single
1. "A Little More" – 3:12
- Digital and streaming single
1. "A Little More" (unplugged) – 3:09
- 7-inch single
1. "A Little More" – 3:12
2. "I Don't Wanna Go to Bed" – 2:25

== Credits and personnel ==
Credits adapted from Tidal.

- Ed Sheeran – songwriting, production, lead vocals
- Blake Slatkin – songwriting, production, keyboards, guitar, bass, programming, engineering
- Cirkut – songwriting, production, keyboards, programming, engineering, vocal engineering
- Johnny McDaid – songwriting
- Dave – songwriting, backing vocals
- Lemar Carter – drums
- Jesse McGinty – baritone saxophone, tenor saxophone, trombone, horn arrangement
- Michael Cordone – trumpet, horn arrangement
- Bill Malina – engineering
- Michael Harris – engineering
- Serban Ghenea – mixing
- Bryce Bordone – assistant mixing engineer
- Stuart Hawkes – mastering

== Charts ==
=== Weekly charts ===
Weekly chart performance for "A Little More"
Chart (2025–2026)	Peak position
Argentina Anglo Airplay (Monitor Latino)	8
Australia (ARIA)	95
Austria (Ö3 Austria Top 40)	62
Bolivia Anglo Airplay (Monitor Latino)	9
Canada Hot 100 (Billboard)	79
Chile Anglo Airplay (Monitor Latino)	5
Costa Rica Anglo Airplay (Monitor Latino)	11
Croatia International Airplay (Top lista)	19
Ecuador Anglo Airplay (Monitor Latino)	10
El Salvador Anglo Airplay (Monitor Latino)	5
Germany (GfK)	65
Global 200 (Billboard)	75
Guatemala Anglo Airplay (Monitor Latino)	8
Ireland (IRMA)	51
Japan Hot Overseas (Billboard Japan)	3
Latin America Anglo Airplay (Monitor Latino)	17
Latvia Airplay (LaIPA)	3
Lebanon (Lebanese Top 20)	19
Lithuania Airplay (TopHit)	7
Mexico Anglo Airplay (Monitor Latino)	5
Netherlands (Single Top 100)	77
New Zealand Hot Singles (RMNZ)	1
Nigeria (TurnTable Top 100)	92
North Macedonia Airplay (Radiomonitor)	6
Sweden (Sverigetopplistan)	51
Paraguay Anglo Airplay (Monitor Latino)	5
Peru Anglo Airplay (Monitor Latino)	9
Portugal Airplay (AFP)	24
Romania Airplay (TopHit)	82
Sweden (Sverigetopplistan)	61
Switzerland (Schweizer Hitparade)	9
UK Singles (Official Charts)	18
Uruguay Anglo Airplay (Monitor Latino)	4
US Bubbling Under Hot 100 (Billboard)	7
Venezuela Airplay (Record Report)	79

=== Monthly charts ===
Monthly chart performance for "A Little More"
Chart (2025)	Peak position
Lithuania Airplay (TopHit)	25

== Certifications ==
Certifications for "A Little More"
Region	Certification	Certified units/sales
New Zealand (RMNZ)	Gold	15,000^{‡}
^{‡} Sales+streaming figures based on certification alone.

== Release history ==
Release history for "A Little More"
Region	Date	Format	Version	Label	Ref.
Various	7 August 2025	Digital download; streaming	Original	Gingerbread Man; Atlantic	
Various	22 August 2025	Digital download; streaming	Unplugged	Gingerbread Man; Atlantic	
Various	28 November 2025	7-inch	Original	Gingerbread Man; Atlantic	
