= Sapphire (song) =

2025 single by Ed Sheeran

Single by Ed Sheeran

from the album Play
- Language: English; Punjabi
- Released: 5 June 2025
- Genre: Punjabi; pop
- Length: 2:59
- Label: Gingerbread Man; Atlantic
- Songwriters: Ed Sheeran; Ilya Salmanzadeh; Johnny McDaid; Savan Kotecha; Mayur Puri; Arijit Singh; Avinash Chouhan
- Producers: Ed Sheeran; Ilya; Johnny McDaid; Savan Kotecha

Ed Sheeran singles chronology
"Old Phone" (2025)	"Sapphire" (2025)	"Drive" (2025)

Music video
- "Sapphire" on YouTube

"Sapphire" is a song by English singer-songwriter Ed Sheeran. It was released on 5 June 2025 as the third single from Sheeran's eighth studio album, Play, through Gingerbread Man Records and Atlantic Records. The track marks Sheeran's first collaboration with an Indian artist, Arijit Singh, who provides uncredited vocals on the bridge, and is noted for its blend of Western pop and Indian Punjabi musical influences. "Sapphire" peaked at number five on the UK Singles Chart, becoming Sheeran's 43rd top 10 hit in his home country. It also reached top 10 in Switzerland, Belgium (Flanders) and the Netherlands. In India, "Sapphire" topped the IMI International Top 20 Singles chart for 18 weeks. A remix of the song featuring additional verses by Singh (as well as an extended Punjabi verse by Sheeran) was released on 25 July 2025. "Sapphire" was nominated for the iHeartRadio Music Award for Best Music Video.

== Background ==
"Sapphire" was the first track recorded for Sheeran's album Play, setting the direction for the entire album. He recorded much of it in Goa with Indian musicians and filmed the accompanying video during his tour across India, aiming to reflect the country's beauty and culture. He added that collaborating with Arijit Singh was the "final jigsaw piece" in bringing the song to life.

== Composition ==
"Sapphire" is a rhythmic and vibrant track that blends Indian cultural elements with Sheeran's signature pop sensibilities, featuring traditional instrumentation and lyrical nods throughout. This cross-cultural approach follows his previous single "Azizam", which drew from Persian and Irish influences.

== Critical reception ==
"Sapphire" was acclaimed by critics, who praised its production and cross-cultural influences. Mark Savage of BBC called it the album's best track, praising Sheeran and Singh's multilingual duet over the song's "lilting" beat. Tom Skinner of NME called the track "dazzling", "joyous" and "anthemic". Melissa Ruggieri of USA Today praised the Indian percussion for lending the song a "rich sonic backdrop". Maya Georgi of Rolling Stone felt "Sapphire" to be among the album's "most interesting moments", praising its "shiny, irresistible rhythm" and remarking that Sheeran has "[hit] a new pop wave" with his cross-cultural experimentation. Shaad D'Souza of Pitchfork found the song "heavy-handed", but noted that "Sheeran's sheer enthusiasm (...) sells [it] entirely" Louis Chilton of The Independent praised the song's "uptempo" blend of Western and Indian sounds, but felt it was "weighed down by banal love-song lyrics and Sheeran's penchant for pat simile". Thomas Smith of Billboard ranked "Sapphire" the sixth best song on Play, but considered the remix with Singh superior to the original, writing that it "offers a more pronounced role for Singh and is perhaps stronger for it".

== Music video ==
The music video for "Sapphire" was directed by Liam Pethick and filmed across various cities in India, including Hyderabad, Kolkata, Arijit Singh's hometown in Murshidabad and Shillong. Released on 5 June 2025, it features Sheeran participating in Indian street culture—riding auto-rickshaws, wearing Ipswich Town football shirts and Rajasthan Royals jersey, playing football with children, playing cricket with Riyan Parag and Tushar Deshpande and exploring busy markets. Some of the locations featured in the music video include the street markets of Sultan Bazar, Ramoji Film City, Falaknuma Palace in Hyderabad, and the Jawaharlal Nehru Football Stadium in Shillong. Arijit Singh appears throughout the video, including footage of him on a scooter with Sheeran. The video includes a cameo appearance by Indian actor Shah Rukh Khan, who lip-syncs part of the chorus. The music video attracted 12 million views on YouTube within its first two days.

== Accolades ==
Organisation	Year	Category	Result	Ref.
MTV Video Music Awards	2025	Song of the Year	Nominated	
MTV Video Music Awards	2025	Best Pop Video	Nominated	
MTV Video Music Awards	2025	Best Cinematography	Nominated	
MTV Video Music Awards	2025	Best Editing	Nominated	

== Track listing ==
- Digital and streaming single
1. "Sapphire" – 2:59
- Digital and streaming single
1. "Sapphire" (unplugged) – 2:56
- Digital and streaming single
1. "Sapphire" (featuring Arijit Singh) – 3:00
- 7-inch single
1. "Sapphire" – 2:59
2. "Sapphire" (featuring Arijit Singh) – 3:00

== Credits and personnel ==
Credits adapted from Tidal.

- Ed Sheeran – songwriting, production, lead vocals, acoustic guitar, backing vocals
- Ilya Salmanzadeh – songwriting, production, vocal production, keyboards, piano, acoustic guitar, bass, drums, backing vocals, programming, engineering
- Johnny McDaid – songwriting, production, piano, electric guitar, backing vocals
- Savan Kotecha – songwriting, production, backing vocals
- Arijit Singh – songwriting, vocals, banjo, sitar, backing vocals, voice editing
- Avinash Chouhan – songwriting
- Mayur Puri – songwriting
- Max Martin – bass
- Gautam Sharma – dhol, tabla, percussion
- Jayesh Kathak – dhol, dholak, shaker, tambourine
- Tapas Ray – santoor, hammered dulcimer, lute
- Citizens of the World Choir – backing vocals
- Becky Dell – choir conductor
- Graham Archer – vocal production
- Yuvraj Sarkar – voice editing
- Ritvik Shah – vocal engineering, vocal recording engineering
- Sukanto Singha – vocal engineering, vocal recording engineering
- Nick Rose – assistant engineer
- Will Reynolds – assistant engineer
- Leon D'souza – supervisor
- Serban Ghenea – mixing
- Bryce Bordoner – assistant mixing engineer
- Stuart Hawkes – mastering

== Charts ==
=== Weekly charts ===
Chart (2025–2026)	Peak position
Argentina Anglo Airplay (Monitor Latino)	7
Australia (ARIA)	21
Austria (Ö3 Austria Top 40)	25
Belarus Airplay (TopHit)	191
Belgium (Ultratop 50 Flanders)	3
Belgium (Ultratop 50 Wallonia)	15
Bolivia Anglo Airplay (Monitor Latino)	7
Canada Hot 100 (Billboard)	30
Canada CHR/Top 40 (Billboard)	35
Central America Anglo Airplay (Monitor Latino)	6
CIS Airplay (TopHit)	30
Chile Anglo Airplay (Monitor Latino)	5
Colombia Anglo Airplay (Monitor Latino)	12
Croatia International Airplay (Top lista)	1
Czech Republic Airplay (ČNS IFPI)	3
Denmark (Tracklisten)	20
Dominican Republic Anglo Airplay (Monitor Latino)	5
Ecuador Anglo Airplay (Monitor Latino)	6
El Salvador Anglo Airplay (Monitor Latino)	1
Estonia Airplay (TopHit)	11
Finland Airplay (Radiosoittolista)	17
France (SNEP)	65
Germany (GfK)	16
Global 200 (Billboard)	8
Guatemala Anglo Airplay (Monitor Latino)	4
Hungary (Editors' Choice Top 40)	6
Iceland (Tónlistinn)	22
India (Billboard)	2
India International (IMI)	1
Ireland (IRMA)	20
Italy (FIMI)	95
Japan Hot Overseas (Billboard Japan)	4
Kazakhstan Airplay (TopHit)	195
Latin America Anglo Airplay (Monitor Latino)	2
Latvia Airplay (LaIPA)	6
Lebanon (Lebanese Top 20)	3
Lebanon English (Lebanese Top 20) (featuring Arijit Singh)	16
Lithuania Airplay (TopHit)	11
Luxembourg (Billboard)	24
Malta Airplay (Radiomonitor)	1
Middle East and North Africa (IFPI)	6
Moldova Airplay (TopHit)	91
Netherlands (Dutch Top 40)	3
Netherlands (Single Top 100)	17
New Zealand (Recorded Music NZ)	16
Nicaragua Anglo Airplay (Monitor Latino)	2
Nigeria (TurnTable Top 100)	56
North Macedonia Airplay (Radiomonitor)	1
Norway (VG-lista)	38
Panama Anglo Airplay (Monitor Latino)	4
Paraguay Airplay (Monitor Latino)	10
Poland Airplay (OLiS)	6
Portugal Airplay (AFP)	21
Puerto Rico Anglo Airplay (Monitor Latino)	4
Romania Airplay (UPFR)	2
Romania Airplay (Media Forest)	1
Romania TV Airplay (Media Forest)	18
Russia Airplay (TopHit)	168
San Marino Airplay (SMRTV Top 50)	6
Serbia Airplay (Radiomonitor)	3
Slovakia Airplay (ČNS IFPI)	4
Slovenia Airplay (Radiomonitor)	3
South Africa Airplay (TOSAC)	5
South Korea BGM (Circle)	26
South Korea Download (Circle)	92
Spain Airplay (Promusicae)	5
Suriname (Nationale Top 40)	2
Sweden (Sverigetopplistan)	30
Switzerland (Schweizer Hitparade)	6
Turkey International Airplay (Radiomonitor Türkiye)	9
United Arab Emirates (IFPI)	1
UK Singles (Official Charts)	5
UK Asian Music (OCC)	1
Uruguay Anglo Airplay (Monitor Latino)	2
US Billboard Hot 100	74
Venezuela Airplay (Record Report)	62

=== Monthly charts ===
Chart (2025)	Peak position
CIS Airplay (TopHit)	35
Estonia Airplay (TopHit)	16
Latvia Airplay (TopHit)	15
Lithuania Airplay (TopHit)	11
Romania Airplay (TopHit)	3

=== Year-end charts ===
Chart (2025)	Position
Argentina Anglo Airplay (Monitor Latino)	25
Belgium (Ultratop 50 Flanders)	26
Belgium (Ultratop 50 Wallonia)	76
Canada (Canadian Hot 100)	99
CIS Airplay (TopHit)	99
Estonia Airplay (TopHit)	49
Germany (GfK)	54
Global 200 (Billboard)	160
Hungary (Editors' Choice Top 40)	90
Iceland (Tónlistinn)	81
India International (IMI)	2
Latvia Airplay (TopHit)	25
Lithuania Airplay (TopHit)	21
Netherlands (Dutch Top 40)	6
Netherlands (Single Top 100)	60
Poland (Polish Airplay Top 100)	64
Romania Airplay (TopHit)	6
Switzerland (Schweizer Hitparade)	90
UK Singles (OCC)	57

== Certifications ==
Certifications for "Sapphire"
Region	Certification	Certified units/sales
Australia (ARIA)	Platinum	70,000^{‡}
Canada (Music Canada)	Platinum	80,000^{‡}
Denmark (IFPI Danmark)	Gold	45,000^{‡}
France (SNEP)	Platinum	200,000^{‡}
New Zealand (RMNZ)	Platinum	30,000^{‡}
Poland (ZPAV)	Gold	62,500^{‡}
United Kingdom (BPI)	Platinum	600,000^{‡}
^{‡} Sales+streaming figures based on certification alone.

== Release history ==
Region	Date	Format	Version	Label	Ref.
Various	5 June 2025	Digital download; streaming	Original	Gingerbread Man; Atlantic	
Italy	11 July 2025	Radio airplay	Original	Gingerbread Man; Atlantic	
Various	11 July 2025	Digital download; streaming	Unplugged	Gingerbread Man; Atlantic	
Various	24 July 2025	Digital download; streaming	feat. Arijit Singh	Gingerbread Man; Atlantic	
Various	22 August 2025	7-inch	Original; feat. Arijit Singh	Gingerbread Man; Atlantic	
