= Ilya Salmanzadeh =

Swedish singer (born 1986)

Ilya
- Also known as: KnocDown
- Born: Ilya Salmanzadeh; 19 September 1986 (age 40); Iran
- Origin: Stockholm, Sweden
- Genres: Pop; Europop; hip hop; R&B
- Occupations: Songwriter; producer; singer
- Instruments: Vocals; keyboards; guitar; bass guitar; percussion
- Labels: Warner/Chappell; Capitol; Island; Republic; Sony; Universal; Wolf Cousins

External image
- Salmanzadeh in 2019

Ilya Salmanzadeh (Persian: ایلیا سلمان‌زاده; /sɑːlmənˈzɑːdə/; born 19 September 1986), known mononymously as Ilya, is an Iranian-born Swedish songwriter, producer, and singer. He rose to prominence outside of Sweden after co-writing and producing Ariana Grande's hit single "Problem" for her second studio album, My Everything (2014). He is a six-time Grammy Awards nominee, including three nominations for Album of the Year: Grande's Thank U, Next (2020), Justin Bieber's Justice (Triple Chucks Deluxe) (2022), and Lizzo's Special (2023).

== Career ==
Ilya Salmanzadeh was born in Iran, raised in Denmark, and moved to Sweden at age 11. In 2005 at the age of 19, he signed with Warner/Chappell Music in Stockholm, Sweden. In 2009, he graduated from the Musicians Institute in Hollywood, California. "Miss Me", Mohombi & Nelly's song in 2010, was Ilya's first internationally acclaimed production. In 2011, he produced "Mama" and "Reba" from The Lonely Island's Grammy-nominated album, Turtleneck & Chain. In 2013, he produced Cher Lloyd's song, "I Wish", and Fifth Harmony's award-winning song, "Me & My Girls".

Alongside Max Martin, he co-wrote and produced Ariana Grande's "Problem" and Jennifer Lopez's "First Love" in 2014. "Problem" went on to become one of the fastest-selling singles in iTunes history before winning a Teen Choice Award, VMA and EMA months later. In June 2014, Ilya was nominated for the Denniz Pop Awards, an annual prize handed out to up-and-coming musicians. "Bang Bang", co-produced by Ilya, was released as a joint single by Jessie J, Ariana Grande and Nicki Minaj on 29 July 2014 to universal acclaim. In January 2015, Ellie Goulding's "Love Me Like You Do", co-written by Ilya, was released for the soundtrack album to the motion picture, Fifty Shades of Grey, becoming the most-streamed song in a week on Spotify. In May 2015, he remixed Taylor Swift's "Bad Blood" with Kendrick Lamar, which became his first No.1 on the Billboard Hot 100.

He co-wrote and produced large parts of Ariana Grande's later albums Sweetener and Thank U, Next. In 2019, Salmanzadeh co-wrote and produced Beyoncé's Grammy-nominated song "Spirit". He also worked on the production of Labrinth's singles "Miracle" and "Oblivion" (which features Sia), both taken from his sophomore solo album, Imagination & the Misfit Kid. In 2025, he co-wrote and produced several songs on Ed Sheeran's album Play, including the singles "Azizam", "Old Phone" and "Sapphire". Sheeran credited Salmanzadeh with providing him the idea of writing a song inspired by the producer's Persian heritage, which went onto become "Azizam". In 2026, Salmanzadeh composed and co-wrote on the Ariana Grande album “Petal”.

== Discography ==
=== Singles ===
As lead artist

- 2007: "Used To Be"

As featured artist

- 2009: "Get You on the Pool" (Kocky & Trash featuring Ilya)
- 2011: "Got It Like That" (Lazee ft. Ilya)

=== Production discography ===
Ilya's works include:

Year	Title	Album	Songwriter	Producer
2008	"Karma" (featuring David Jassy)	Darin Zanyar – Flashback	check	check
2008	"Road Trip"	Darin Zanyar – Flashback	check	check
2010	"Miss Me" (ft. Nelly)	Mohombi – MoveMeant	check	check
2011	"Alienized"	Linda Pritchard – Alive	check	check
2011	"Crying in the Rain"	Linda Pritchard – Alive	check	check
2011	"Dance Your Tears Away"	Linda Pritchard – Alive	check	
2011	"Erase & Rewind"	Linda Pritchard – Alive	check	check
2011	"Glorious"	Linda Pritchard – Alive	check	check
2011	"Miracle"	Linda Pritchard – Alive	check	check
2011	"Not Even Hello"	Linda Pritchard – Alive	check	check
2011	"On Time"	Linda Pritchard – Alive	check	check
2011	"Rise Again"	Linda Pritchard – Alive	check	check
2011	"Satellite"	Linda Pritchard – Alive	check	check
2011	"Stuck in a Riddle"	Linda Pritchard – Alive	check	check
2011	"Got It Like That"	Lazee – Supposed II Happen	check	check
2011	"Explosive Love"	Eric Saade – Saade Vol. 2	check	
2011	"Feel Alive"	Eric Saade – Saade Vol. 2	check	
2011	"Mama"	The Lonely Island – Turtleneck & Chain		check
2011	"Reba (Two Worlds Collide)" (ft. Kenan Thompson)	The Lonely Island – Turtleneck & Chain	check	check
2011	"Finally Free"	Kimberley Locke – Four for the Floor	check	check
2012	"Get Started"	David Lindgren – Get Started	check	
2012	"Bastard"	Amanda Fondell – Bastard	check	check
2013	"Can't Hold Back"	Anton Ewald – A	check	check
2013	"We Are a Crowd"	The Lonely Island – The Wack Album	check	check
2013	"Me & My Girls"	Fifth Harmony – Better Together		check
2013	"I Wish" (ft. T.I.)	Cher Lloyd – Sorry I'm Late	check	check
2014	"One Last Time"	Ariana Grande – My Everything		check
2014	"Problem" (ft. Iggy Azalea)	Ariana Grande – My Everything	check	check
2014	"First Love"	Jennifer Lopez – AKA	check	check
2014	"Bang Bang" (Jessie J with Ariana Grande & Nicki Minaj)	Jessie J – Sweet Talker; Ariana Grande – My Everything		check
2014	"Dreamers"	Mohombi – Universe	check	check
2014	"Grow Old With You"	Mohombi – Universe	check	check
2014	"Just Like That"	Mohombi – Universe	check	check
2014	"Save Me"	Mohombi – Universe	check	check
2014	"Comeback"	Ella Eyre – Feline	check	check
2014	"Santa Tell Me"	Ariana Grande – Christmas Kisses	check	check
2015	"Love Me like You Do"	Ellie Goulding – Fifty Shades of Grey (Original Motion Picture Soundtrack)	check	
2015	"Things I Didn't Say"	Adam Lambert – The Original High	check	check
2015	"City Dove"	Tori Kelly – Unbreakable Smile	check	check
2015	"Back It Up" (ft. Pitbull)	Prince Royce – Double Vision	check	check
2015	"Back It Up" (ft. Jennifer Lopez & Pitbull)	Prince Royce – Double Vision	check	check
2015	"Bad Blood" (ft. Kendrick Lamar)	Taylor Swift – 1989		check
2015	"Good Thing" (ft. Nick Jonas)	Sage the Gemini – Bachelor Party	check	check
2015	"Around the World" (ft. Fetty Wap)	Natalie La Rose – Around the World	check	check
2015	"One in a Million"	Hilary Duff – Breathe In. Breathe Out.	check	check
2015	"Confident"	Demi Lovato – Confident	check	check
2015	"Mr. Hughes"	Demi Lovato – Confident		check
2015	"On My Mind"	Ellie Goulding – Delirium	check	check
2015	"Codes"	Ellie Goulding – Delirium	check	check
2015	"Pay My Rent"	DNCE – Swaay	check	check
2015	"Toothbrush"	DNCE – Swaay	check	check
2015	"Focus"	Ariana Grande – Dangerous Woman	check	check
2016	"Bad Decisions"	Ariana Grande – Dangerous Woman	check	check
2016	"Everyday" (ft. Future)	Ariana Grande – Dangerous Woman	check	check
2016	"Greedy"	Ariana Grande – Dangerous Woman	check	check
2016	"Into You"	Ariana Grande – Dangerous Woman	check	check
2016	"Side to Side" (ft. Nicki Minaj)	Ariana Grande – Dangerous Woman	check	check
2016	"Sometimes"	Ariana Grande – Dangerous Woman	check	check
2016	"Still Falling for You"	Ellie Goulding – Bridget Jones's Baby: Original Motion Picture Soundtrack	check	check
2016	"Don't Talk About It"	Tove Lo – Lady Wood	check	check
2016	"Fire Fade"	Tove Lo – Lady Wood	check	check
2016	"They Don't Know"	Ariana Grande – Trolls: Original Motion Picture Soundtrack	check	check
2016	"What U Workin' With?"	Gwen Stefani & Justin Timberlake – Trolls: Original Motion Picture Soundtrack	check	check
2016	"DNCE"	DNCE – DNCE	check	check
2016	"Pay My Rent"	DNCE – DNCE	check	check
2016	"Toothbrush"	DNCE – DNCE	check	check
2016	"Zoom"	DNCE – DNCE	check	check
2017	"Lions"	Skip Marley – Lions	check	check
2017	"Calm Down"	Skip Marley – Calm Down	check	check
2017	"Act My Age"	Katy Perry – Witness		check
2017	"Ain't About What You Got"	Star cast – Star (season 1) soundtrack	check	check
2017	"Would You Mind"	PRETTYMUCH – Would You Mind	check	check
2017	"End Game" (ft. Ed Sheeran and Future)	Taylor Swift – Reputation		(Note: Additional vocal producer)
2017	"Refugee"	Skip Marley – Refugee	check	check
2017	"Teacher"	PRETTYMUCH – Teacher	check	check
2017	"Open Arms"	PRETTYMUCH – Open Arms	check	check
2018	"Raindrops (An Angel Cried)"	Ariana Grande – Sweetener		check
2018	"God Is a Woman"	Ariana Grande – Sweetener	check	check
2018	"Everytime"	Ariana Grande – Sweetener	check	check
2018	"Breathin"	Ariana Grande – Sweetener	check	check
2018	"No Tears Left to Cry"	Ariana Grande – Sweetener	check	check
2018	"Close To Me" (ft. Swae Lee)	Ellie Goulding & Diplo – Brightest Blue	check	check
2018	"Last Goodbye" (ft. Tove Styrke & Stefflon Don)	Clean Bandit – What Is Love?	check	check
2019	"Bloodline"	Ariana Grande – Thank U, Next	check	check
2019	"Bad Idea"	Ariana Grande – Thank U, Next	check	check
2019	"Ghostin"	Ariana Grande – Thank U, Next	check	check
2019	"Break Up with Your Girlfriend, I'm Bored"	Ariana Grande – Thank U, Next	check	check
2019	"Tu Vecina" (ft. Ty Dolla Sign)	Maluma – 11:11	check	check
2019	"Miracle"	Labrinth – Imagination & the Misfit Kid	check	check
2019	"Oblivion" (ft. Sia)	Labrinth – Imagination & the Misfit Kid		check
2019	"Spirit"	Beyoncé – The Lion King: Original Motion Picture Soundtrack	check	check
2019	"How Do You Sleep?"	Sam Smith – Love Goes	check	check
2019	"Don't Call Me Angel"	Ariana Grande, Miley Cyrus, Lana Del Rey and various artists – Charlie's Angels: Original Motion Picture Soundtrack	check	check
2019	"How It's Done"	Ariana Grande, Miley Cyrus, Lana Del Rey and various artists – Charlie's Angels: Original Motion Picture Soundtrack	check	check
2019	"Bad to You"	Ariana Grande, Miley Cyrus, Lana Del Rey and various artists – Charlie's Angels: Original Motion Picture Soundtrack	check	check
2019	"Nobody"	Ariana Grande, Miley Cyrus, Lana Del Rey and various artists – Charlie's Angels: Original Motion Picture Soundtrack	check	check
2019	"How I Look on You"	Ariana Grande, Miley Cyrus, Lana Del Rey and various artists – Charlie's Angels: Original Motion Picture Soundtrack	check	check
2019	"Motivation"	Normani – Motivation	check	check
2020	"I'm Ready"	Sam Smith and Demi Lovato – Love Goes	check	check
2020	"Worry About Me" (ft. Blackbear)	Ellie Goulding – Brightest Blue	check	check
2020	"My Oasis" (ft. Burna Boy)	Sam Smith – Love Goes		check
2020	"High on Your Supply"	Katy Perry – Smile	check	check
2021	"Oh Na Na" (with Myke Towers and Tainy)	Camila Cabello – Familia	check	
2021	"Telepath"	Conan Gray – non-album single	check	check
2021	"Alone Together"	Westlife – Wild Dreams	check	
2022	"Lightning"	Charli XCX – Crash	check	
2022	"Unholy"	Sam Smith – Gloria	check	check
2022	"I Love Your Girl"	Mabel – About Last Night...	check	check
2022	"Grrrls"	Lizzo – Special	check	check
2022	"If Jesus Was a Rockstar"	Kim Petras – non-album single	check	check
2023	"Brrr"	Kim Petras – Feed the Beast	check	check
2023	"Vulgar" (Sam Smith and Madonna)	Sam Smith and Madonna – non-album single	check	check
2024	"Bye"	Ariana Grande – Eternal Sunshine	check	check
2024	"Don't Wanna Break Up Again"	Ariana Grande – Eternal Sunshine	check	check
2024	"Saturn Returns Interlude"	Ariana Grande – Eternal Sunshine	check	check
2024	"Eternal Sunshine"	Ariana Grande – Eternal Sunshine		check
2024	"True Story"	Ariana Grande – Eternal Sunshine		check
2024	"The Boy Is Mine"	Ariana Grande – Eternal Sunshine		check
2024	"Yes, And?"	Ariana Grande – Eternal Sunshine	check	check
2024	"We Can't Be Friends (Wait for Your Love)"	Ariana Grande – Eternal Sunshine	check	check
2024	"I Wish I Hated You"	Ariana Grande – Eternal Sunshine	check	check
2024	"Imperfect for You"	Ariana Grande – Eternal Sunshine	check	check
2024	"Never Ending Song"	Conan Gray – Found Heaven	check	check
2024	"Lonely Dancers"	Conan Gray – Found Heaven	check	check
2024	"The Final Fight"	Conan Gray – Found Heaven	check	check
2024	"New Woman" (ft. Rosalía)	Lisa – Alter Ego	check	check
2024	"WE PRAY"	Coldplay, Little Simz, Burna Boy, Elyanna and Tini – Moon Music	check	check
2024	"It's OK I'm OK"	Tate McRae – So Close to What	check	check
2025	"All of the Same Lights"	Sabliess – Chaotic	check	check
2025	"Twilight Zone"	Ariana Grande – Eternal Sunshine Deluxe: Brighter Days Ahead	check	check
2025	"Dandelion"	Ariana Grande – Eternal Sunshine Deluxe: Brighter Days Ahead	check	check
2025	"Past Life"	Ariana Grande – Eternal Sunshine Deluxe: Brighter Days Ahead	check	check
2025	"Hampstead"	Ariana Grande – Eternal Sunshine Deluxe: Brighter Days Ahead	check	check
2025	"Sapphire"	Ed Sheeran – Play	check	check
2025	"Azizam"	Ed Sheeran – Play	check	check
2025	"Old Phone"	Ed Sheeran – Play		check
2025	"Symmetry"	Ed Sheeran – Play	check	check
2025	"Camera"	Ed Sheeran – Play	check	check
2025	"Don't Look Down"	Ed Sheeran – Play	check	check
2025	"Heaven"	Ed Sheeran – Play	check	check
2025	"Medicine"	Khalid – After the Sun Goes Down	check	check
2025	"In Plain Sight"	Khalid – After the Sun Goes Down	check	check
2025	"Nah"	Khalid – After the Sun Goes Down	check	check
2025	"Impulsive"	Khalid – After the Sun Goes Down	check	check
2025	"Tank Top"	Khalid – After the Sun Goes Down	check	check
2025	"Whenever You're Gone"	Khalid – After the Sun Goes Down	check	check
2025	"Dumbstruck"	Khalid – After the Sun Goes Down	check	check
2025	"Rendezvous"	Khalid – After the Sun Goes Down	check	check
2025	"True"	Khalid – After the Sun Goes Down	check	check
2025	"Instant"	Khalid – After the Sun Goes Down	check	check
2025	"Momentary Lovers"	Khalid – After the Sun Goes Down	check	check
2025	"Yes No Maybe"	Khalid – After the Sun Goes Down	check	check
2025	"Angel Boy"	Khalid – After the Sun Goes Down	check	check
2025	"Hurt People"	Khalid – After the Sun Goes Down	check	check
2026	"Kiss Me"	Ariana Grande – Petal	check	check
2026	"Hate That I Made You Love Me"	Ariana Grande – Petal	check	check
2026	"Petal"	Ariana Grande – Petal	check	check
2026	"Stay"	Ariana Grande – Petal	check	check
2026	"Oh Well"	Ariana Grande – Petal	check	check
2026	"Big Feelings"	Ariana Grande – Petal	check	check
2026	"Freak"	Ariana Grande – Petal	check	check
2026	"Warning Signs" (interlude)	Ariana Grande – Petal	check	check
2026	"Like I Do"	Ariana Grande – Petal	check	check
2026	"Never Get Over Me"	Ariana Grande – Petal	check	check
2026	"Bad Thing (Bunny Hop)"	Ariana Grande – Petal	check	check
2026	"Nowhere, Nobody"	Ariana Grande – Petal	check	check
2026	"Question Of The Day"	Chloe Qisha – Fantasize	check	check
2026	"Possessed (in a hot way)"	Chloe Qisha – Fantasize	check	check
2026	"Surprise, Surprise"	Chloe Qisha – Fantasize	check	check
2026	"Fantasize"	Chloe Qisha – Fantasize	check	check
2026	"Blood In Your Eyes"	Tove Lo – Grand Theft Auto VI: The Album	check	check

== Awards and nominations ==
Year	Award	Category	Nominated work	Result	Ref.
2012	Grammy Award	Best Comedy Album	Turtleneck & Chain (songwriter & producer)	Nominated	
2014	Radio Disney Music Awards	Best Song to Rock Out to With Your BFF	"Me & My Girls" (producer)	Won	
2014	Radio Disney Music Awards	Catchiest New Song	"I Wish" (songwriter & producer)	Nominated	
2014	Denniz Pop Awards	Rookie Songwriter/Producer	Himself	Nominated	
2014	Swedish Music Publishers Prize	Year's Breakthrough	Himself	Nominated	
2014	Teen Choice Awards	Song: Female Artist	"Problem" (songwriter & producer)	Won	
2014	MTV Video Music Award	Best Female Video	"Problem" (songwriter & producer)	Nominated	
2014	MTV Video Music Award	Best Pop Video	"Problem" (songwriter & producer)	Won	
2014	MTV Video Music Award	Best Collaboration	"Problem" (songwriter & producer)	Nominated	
2014	MTV Video Music Award	Best Lyric Video	"Problem" (songwriter & producer)	Nominated	
2014	MTV Europe Music Awards	Best Song	"Problem" (songwriter & producer)	Won	
2015	People's Choice Awards	Favorite Song	"Bang Bang" (producer)	Nominated	
2015	People's Choice Awards	Favorite Album	My Everything (songwriter, producer & programmer)	Nominated	
2015	Grammy Award	Best Pop Duo/Group Performance	"Bang Bang" (producer)	Nominated	
2015	Grammy Award	Best Pop Vocal Album	My Everything (songwriter, producer & programmer)	Nominated	
2015	Nickelodeon Kids' Choice Awards	Favorite Song of the Year	"Bang Bang" (producer)	Won	
2015	Nickelodeon Kids' Choice Awards	Favorite Song of the Year	"Problem" (songwriter & producer)	Nominated	
2015	iHeartRadio Music Awards	Best Collaboration	"Bang Bang" (producer)	Won	
2015	iHeartRadio Music Awards	Best Collaboration	"Problem" (songwriter & producer)	Nominated	
2015	Radio Disney Music Awards	Song of the Year	"Problem" (songwriter & producer)	Won	
2015	ASCAP Pop Music Awards	Writer Among the Most Performed Songs	Himself	Won	
2015	Billboard Music Award	Top Soundtrack	Fifty Shades of Grey (songwriter)	Nominated	
2015	MTV Europe Music Awards	Best Song	"Bad Blood" (producer)	Won	
2015	MTV Europe Music Awards	Best Song	"Love Me like You Do" (songwriter)	Nominated	
2015	Latin Grammy Award	Best Urban Song	"Back It Up (Spanish Version)" (songwriter & producer)	Nominated	
2015	American Music Award	Top Soundtrack	Fifty Shades of Grey (composer)	Nominated	
2015	American Music Award	Collaboration of the Year	"Bad Blood" (producer)	Nominated	
2016	People's Choice Awards	Favorite Song of the Year	"Bad Blood" (producer)	Nominated	
2016	People's Choice Awards	Favorite Song of the Year	"Love Me like You Do" (songwriter)	Nominated	
2016	Golden Globe Award	Best Original Song	"Love Me like You Do" (songwriter)	Nominated	
2016	Critics' Choice Movie Awards	Best Song	"Love Me like You Do" (songwriter)	Nominated	
2016	Grammy Award	Best Pop Solo Performance	"Love Me like You Do" (songwriter)	Nominated	
2016	Grammy Award	Best Song Written for Visual Media	"Love Me like You Do" (songwriter)	Nominated	
2016	Grammy Award	Best Compilation Soundtrack for Visual Media	Fifty Shades of Grey (songwriter)	Nominated	
2022	Grammy Award	Album of the Year	Justice (producer & songwriter)	Nominated	
2023	Grammy Award	Album of the Year	Special (producer, engineers & mixer)	Nominated	
2025	Grammy Award	Best Dance Pop Recording	Yes, And? (producer)	Nominated	

== See also ==
- Persian Swedes
- List of songs recorded by Jennifer Lopez
