= Play (Ed Sheeran album) =

2025 studio album by Ed Sheeran

- Standard edition cover

Studio album by Ed Sheeran
- Released: 12 September 2025
- Genre: Pop
- Length: 44:38
- Languages: English; Punjabi; Persian; Hindi
- Labels: Gingerbread Man; Atlantic
- Producers: Ed Sheeran; Elvira Anderfjärd; Louis Bell; Jo Caleb; Cirkut; Kyle Evans; Omer Fedi; Fred; David Hodges; Ilya; Savan Kotecha; Johnny Leslie; Steve Mac; Johnny McDaid; P2J; Santan Dave; Blake Slatkin; Andrew Watt

Ed Sheeran chronology
+−=÷× (Tour Collection) (2024)	Play (2025)

Singles from Play
- 1. "Azizam" Released: 4 April 2025; 2. "Old Phone" Released: 1 May 2025; 3. "Sapphire" Released: 5 June 2025; 4. "A Little More" Released: 7 August 2025; 5. "Camera" Released: 12 September 2025

Play (also stylized as "▶") is the eighth studio album by English singer-songwriter Ed Sheeran. It was released on 12 September 2025, through Gingerbread Man Records and Atlantic Records. It is the first of Sheeran's planned pentalogy of albums titled after media control symbols, with Pause, Fast Forward, Rewind, and Stop to follow. There is a sixth, Eject, which Sheeran stated he would like to be posthumously released on the day he dies.

Sheeran co-wrote and produced Play with various producers and musicians, including Ilya, Blake Slatkin, Cirkut, Omer Fedi, Savan Kotecha, Elvira Anderfjärd, Dave, and Arijit Singh, as well as his frequent collaborators Johnny McDaid and Fred Again. The album experiments with sounds from Indian and Persian music, while also continuing the electropop sound Sheeran explored in = (2021). Play was supported by five singles: "Azizam", "Old Phone", "Sapphire", "A Little More", and "Camera". It became Sheeran's ninth consecutive chart-topper in the United Kingdom. It also topped the charts in Ireland, Germany, Austria, Switzerland, Belgium (Flanders), Poland, Australia, and New Zealand. The album received mixed reviews from critics, who appreciated its production and global influences but criticised the lack of artistic reinvention. Play won Album of the Year at the Los 40 Music Awards.

An EP, Play (The Remixes), featuring Indian artists like Arijit Singh, Karan Aujla, Hanumankind and Jonita on remixes of four songs from the album was released on 17 October 2025. To promote Play, Sheeran embarked on the Loop Tour in January 2026 in New Zealand. A deluxe edition, featuring 14 additional tracks, was released on 28 November 2025. Play was the last album Sheeran released under Atlantic before he departed from the label's parent company Warner Music in May 2026 and signed to Interscope Records.

== Background ==
After releasing two acoustic albums in 2023, − and Autumn Variations, Sheeran announced in December 2024 that with Play, he is getting back into "big pop". In March 2025, he announced the April release of lead single "Azizam" and also confirmed the titles of two other songs from Play: "Old Phone" and "Sapphire". Sheeran performed several songs from Play during the final 2025 leg of his +−=÷× Tour.

== Singles ==
The lead single, "Azizam", was released on 4 April 2025 and debuted at number three on the UK Singles Chart and number 28 on the Billboard Hot 100 in the United States. The second single, "Old Phone", was issued on 1 May 2025. The third single, "Sapphire", was released on 5 June 2025, reaching number five in the UK and number 74 in the US. The fourth single, "A Little More", premiered on 7 August 2025. "Camera" was released as the fifth single on 12 September 2025, alongside the album.

== Critical reception ==
Play ratings
Aggregate scores
Source	Rating
AnyDecentMusic?	5.5/10
Metacritic	60/100
Review scores
Source	Rating
AllMusic	3.5/5 stars
The Arts Desk	1/5 stars
Associated Press	3/5 stars
The Guardian	3/5 stars
The Independent	3/5 stars
The Irish Times	4/5 stars
NME	3/5 stars
Pitchfork	4.3/10
Rolling Stone	3/5 stars
The Telegraph	4/5 stars

On Metacritic, Play has a weighted average score of 60 out of 100 based on six reviews, indicating "mixed or average reviews". The review aggregator site AnyDecentMusic? compiled nine reviews and gave the album a 5.5 out of 10.

Billboard's Thomas Smith wrote that Play is a "buoyant record that traverses moods and continents" and that this is "Ed back at his vibrant best". The Irish Times's Ed Power described the album as "enjoyably moreish" and stated that Sheeran sounds as if he is back on form. Alexis Petridis from The Guardian defined Play as "solid" and "dependable". He felt that despite embracing Indian and Persian sounds on selected songs, the album goes back to basics, but with some "surprising undercurrents". He highlighted "Symmetry", which opens with looped Indian percussion and vocals but quickly floats off in a different direction, involving spectral voices and heaving sub-bass, and "Don't Look Down", which "fruitfully" places Sheeran's vocal amid luminous rave synths and, eventually, a pounding house beat.

The Independent's Louis Chilton wrote that Play's production is "slick and glossy" and that Sheeran's singing is "reliably rich in emotion". He named "Azizam", which pulls from the Farsi music tradition, as one of the album's better efforts, and highlighted "Sapphire", an uptempo mashup of Punjabi music and Western pop. NME's Jordan Bassett praised "Don't Look Down", which he called a "psytrance banger", that could have been in the trailer for "one of those ropey Matrix sequels in 2003". Maya Georgi from the Rolling Stone felt that Sheeran taps into some fun cross-cultural rhythms, but he mostly sticks to his trusty formula. She praised the "sultry" dance-floor number "Symmetry", which has a "thumping heart that can get anyone dancing".

== Commercial performance ==
Play debuted atop the UK Albums Chart with 67,654 album-equivalent units, becoming Sheeran's ninth album to achieve this. In the United States, Sheeran scored his eighth top 10-charting album on the Billboard 200. Play debuted at number five with 71,000 equivalent album units earned, of which 51,000 were pure sales.

== Track listing ==
Standard edition
No.	Title	Writer(s)	Producer(s)	Length
1.	"Opening"	Ed Sheeran; Blake Slatkin; Omer Fedi; Johnny McDaid; Henry Walter; David Omoregie	Sheeran; Slatkin; Cirkut; Fedi; McDaid	4:00
2.	"Sapphire"	Sheeran; Ilya Salmanzadeh; McDaid; Savan Kotecha; Mayur Puri; Arijit Singh; Avinash Chouhan	Sheeran; Ilya^{[p]}; McDaid; Kotecha; Graham Archer^{[v]}	2:59
3.	"Azizam"	Sheeran; Salmanzadeh; McDaid; Kotecha	Sheeran; Ilya^{[p]}; McDaid; Kotecha; Archer^{[v]}	2:42
4.	"Old Phone"	Sheeran	Sheeran; Ilya; Slatkin	3:41
5.	"Symmetry"	Sheeran; McDaid; Kotecha; Salmanzadeh	Sheeran; Ilya^{[p]}; McDaid; Kotecha; Archer^{[v]}	2:48
6.	"Camera"	Sheeran; Andrew Watt; Louis Bell; David Hodges	Sheeran; Ilya^{[p]}; Watt^{[p]}; Bell^{[p]}; Archer^{[v]}	3:35
7.	"In Other Words"	Sheeran; Slatkin; Walter; McDaid	Sheeran; Slatkin; Cirkut	3:42
8.	"A Little More"	Sheeran; Slatkin; Walter; McDaid; Omoregie	Sheeran; Slatkin; Cirkut	3:12
9.	"Slowly"	Sheeran; Slatkin; Fedi	Sheeran; Slatkin; Fedi; Archer^{[v]}	3:21
10.	"Don't Look Down"	Sheeran; Fred Gibson; Elvira Anderfjärd; Salmanzadeh	Sheeran; Ilya^{[p]}; Fred; Anderfjärd; Archer^{[v]}	3:37
11.	"The Vow"	Sheeran; Slatkin; McDaid; Fedi	Sheeran; Slatkin; Fedi	3:32
12.	"For Always"	Sheeran; Amy Allen; Slatkin	Sheeran; Slatkin	3:27
13.	"Heaven"	Sheeran; McDaid; Kotecha; Salmanzadeh	Sheeran; Ilya^{[p]}; McDaid; Kotecha; Archer^{[v]}	4:02
Total length:				44:38

Deluxe extended edition
No.	Title	Writer(s)	Producer(s)	Length
14.	"Problems"	Sheeran; Anderfjärd	Sheeran; Anderfjärd	2:54
15.	"War Game"	Sheeran; Anderfjärd	Sheeran; Anderfjärd	3:12
16.	"Regrets"	Sheeran; Salmanzadeh; McDaid; Kotecha; Jo Caleb; Omoregie	Sheeran; McDaid; Kotecha; Ilya^{[p]}; Archer^{[v]}	3:48
17.	"Freedom"	Sheeran; McDaid; Steve Mac	Sheeran; Mac	3:57
18.	"Skeletons"	Sheeran; Allen; Slatkin; Richard Isong	Sheeran; Slatkin; P2J	2:41
19.	"Technicolour"	Sheeran; Caleb; Johnny Leslie; Slatkin; Omoregie	Sheeran; Caleb; Leslie	2:19
20.	"Satellite"	Sheeran; Omoregie; Kyle Evans; McDaid	Sheeran; Dave; Evans	2:39
21.	"Lights Out"	Sheeran; Anderfjärd	Sheeran; Anderfjärd	3:15
22.	"Fade Out"	Sheeran; Caleb; Leslie; Omoregie	Sheeran; Caleb; Leslie	2:47
23.	"Crashing"	Sheeran; Salmanzadeh; McDaid; Kotecha	Sheeran; Ilya^{[p]}; McDaid; Archer^{[v]}	4:09
24.	"Rapture"	Sheeran; Slatkin; Fedi	Sheeran; Slatkin; Fedi	3:24
25.	"Sapphire" (featuring Arijit Singh)	Sheeran; Salmanzadeh; McDaid; Kotecha; Puri; Singh; Chouhan	Sheeran; Ilya^{[p]}; McDaid; Kotecha; Archer^{[v]}	3:00
26.	"Spiral"	Sheeran; Hodges; Amy Wadge	Hodges	3:14
27.	"I Don't Wanna Go to Bed"	Sheeran; Slatkin; Fedi	Sheeran; Slatkin; Fedi	2:25
Total length:				88:29

=== Note ===
- ^{^[p]} signifies a primary and vocal producer
- ^{^[v]} signifies a vocal producer

== Personnel ==
Credits adapted from Tidal.

=== Musicians ===
- Ed Sheeran – lead vocals (all tracks), guitar (tracks 1, 3, 4, 9, 11, 12, 16, 17), acoustic guitar (2, 5, 13, 17, 18), backing vocals (2, 5, 17, 18)
- Johnny McDaid – electric guitar (1, 2, 5, 13, 18), programming (1), backing vocals (2, 3, 5, 16, 18), piano (2, 7), keyboards (2, 16, 18), guitar (3, 16), acoustic guitar (5, 13)
- Blake Slatkin – keyboards (1, 4, 8); additional instrumentation, drum programming (1); programming (4, 8, 9), backing vocals (4, 9); bass, guitar (8, 12); tambourine (9)
- Cirkut – keyboards (1, 8); additional instrumentation, drum programming (1); programming (8)
- Omer Fedi – guitar (1, 9, 11); additional instrumentation, drum programming, keyboards (1); bass (9, 11); drums, programming (9)
- Ilya Salmanzadeh – keyboards, programming (2–6, 10, 13, 16, 18); , bass (2, 3, 5, 6, 10, 18), drums (2, 3, 6, 10, 16, 18), backing vocals (2, 4–6, 10, 13, 16, 18); acoustic guitar, piano (2, 18); electric guitar (5), guitar (6, 10), synthesizer (10)
- Tapas Ray – lute (2–5, 18), santoor (2, 3, 17, 18), mandolin (4)
- Savan Kotecha – backing vocals (2, 3, 5, 16, 18), programming (16)
- Jayesh Kathak – shaker (2, 4, 5, 10, 13, 16, 18), tambourine (2, 4, 5, 13, 16, 18), dholak drums (2, 5, 18), dhol drums (2, 10, 18), riq (3), güiro (4, 16), khartal (4), tabla (5, 10), percussion (5), castanets (10, 13), congas (10); bells, djembe (16)
- Gautam Sharma – dhol drums (2, 4, 5, 10, 14, 15, 18), percussion (2, 4, 5, 10, 18), tabla (2, 18), tambourine (4), drums (10)
- Citizens of the World Choir – backing vocals (2, 18), choral backing vocals (3)
- Max Martin – bass (2, 18), guitar (6)
- Arijit Singh – backing vocals, banjo, sitar, vocals (2, 18)
- Becky Dell – choir conductor (2, 18)
- Ganesh Murali – ghatam (3–5, 13, 14, 17), tambourine (3, 4, 13, 16, 17), drums (10), percussion (14)
- Elvira Anderfjärd – backing vocals (3, 4, 14, 15), cello (6), programming (10, 14, 15), synthesizer (10); bass, drums (14, 15); keyboards (14)
- Andy – backing vocals (3)
- Arash – backing vocals (3)
- Eyelar Mirzazadeh – backing vocals (3)
- Luka Kloser – backing vocals (3)
- Lemar Carter – drums (4, 8, 11)
- Dylan Day – guitar (4, 9, 12)
- Davide Rossi – cello, viola, violin, strings arrangement (4)
- Beoga – banjo, piano, strings (4)
- Pino Palladino – bass (4)
- Rohan Sonwani – bansuri (5, 10, 13, 15)
- Andrew Watt – drums, guitar (6)
- Abe Laboriel Jr. – drums, percussion (6)
- Louis Bell – keyboards, programming (6)
- David Hodges – piano (6)
- Matthew Sheeran – strings arrangement (7)
- Budapest Scoring Orchestra – strings (7)
- Dave – backing vocals (8)
- Jesse McGinty – baritone saxophone, tenor saxophone, trombone, brass arrangement, woodwind arrangement (8)
- Michael Cordone – trumpet, trumpet arrangement (8)
- Larry Goldings – Wurlitzer (9)
- Fred – backing vocals, bass, drums, guitar, keyboards, programming, synthesizer (10)
- Paul Cornish – Wurlitzer (11, 12); organ, piano (11)
- Nick Ellman – baritone saxophone, tenor saxophone, horn arrangement (11)
- Raymond James Mason – flugelhorn, horn arrangement (11)
- John Michael Bradford – trumpet, horn arrangement (11)
- Lucy Healey – additional vocals (11)
- Our Dementia Choir – additional vocals (11)
- Ashton Miranda – choir arrangement, vocal arrangement (11)
- Larry Gold – strings arrangement, strings conductor (11)
- Vivian Barton-Dozor – cello (11)
- Kathleen Foster – viola (11)
- Steven Heitlinger – viola (11)
- Emma Kummrow – violin (11)
- Gared Crawford – violin (11)
- Joseph Kauffman – violin (11)
- Natasha Colkett – violin (11)
- Tess Varley – violin (11)
- Yu-Hui Tamae Lee – violin (11)
- Amy Allen – backing vocals (12)
- Shilpa Rao – backing vocals (13)
- Megha Rawoot – sitar (13)
- Magnus Anderfjärd – percussion (14, 15), cajón (14)
- Max Grahn – guitar, mandolin (14)
- Steve Mac – piano (17)

=== Technical ===
- Mark "Spike" Stent – mixing (1, 4, 7, 9, 12, 17)
- Serban Ghenea – mixing (2, 3, 5, 6, 8, 10, 11, 13–16, 18)
- Stuart Hawkes – mastering (1–10, 12–18)
- Randy Merrill – mastering (11)
- Blake Slatkin – engineering (1, 4, 7–9, 11, 12), vocal engineering (1, 9, 11, 12)
- Cirkut – engineering, vocal engineering (1, 8)
- Graham Archer – engineering (2–6, 10, 13, 14, 17, 18), vocal engineering (9, 11)
- Ilya Salmanzadeh – engineering (2–6, 10, 13, 18)
- Jeremy Lertola – engineering (4–6, 10, 13), engineering assistance (3, 5)
- Michael Harris – engineering (4, 8, 11)
- Akash Musherejee – engineering (5, 13)
- Bill Malina – engineering (8)
- Paul Lamalfa – engineering (6)
- Louis Bell – engineering (6)
- Robert Palma – engineering (7), engineering assistance (1, 8)
- Hunter Goddard – engineering (7), vocal engineering (5, 11)
- Robert Sellens – engineering (14)
- Elvira Anderfjärd – engineering (15)
- Chris Laws – engineering (17)
- Dan Pursey – engineering (17)
- Ritvik Shah – vocal engineering (2, 18)
- Sukanto Singha – vocal engineering (2, 18)
- Connor Protheroe – vocal engineering (11)
- Ewan Lunn – vocal engineering (11)
- Matt J. Barnes – vocal engineering (11)
- Arijit Singh – voice editing (2, 18)
- Yuvraj Sarkar – voice editing (2, 18)
- Kieran Beardmore – mixing assistance (1, 4, 7, 9, 12, 17)
- Matt Wolach – mixing assistance (1, 4, 7, 9, 12, 17)
- Bryce Bordone – mixing assistance (2, 3, 5, 6, 8, 10, 11, 14, 15, 18)
- Will Reynolds – engineering assistance (2, 3, 5, 10, 13, 17, 18)
- Nick Rose – engineering assistance (2, 3, 16, 18)
- Juan Arguello – engineering assistance (10)

== Charts ==
=== Weekly charts ===
Chart (2025)	Peak position
Australian Albums (ARIA)	1
Austrian Albums (Ö3 Austria)	1
Belgian Albums (Ultratop Flanders)	1
Belgian Albums (Ultratop Wallonia)	2
Canadian Albums (Billboard)	6
Croatian International Albums (HDU)	2
Czech Albums (ČNS IFPI)	24
Danish Albums (Hitlisten)	2
Dutch Albums (Album Top 100)	2
Finnish Albums (Suomen virallinen lista)	42
French Albums (SNEP)	3
German Albums (Offizielle Top 100)	1
German Pop Albums (Offizielle Top 100)	1
Hungarian Albums (MAHASZ)	4
Irish Albums (Official Charts)	1
Italian Albums (FIMI)	2
Japanese Albums (Oricon)	23
Japanese Combined Albums (Oricon)	31
Japanese Hot Albums (Billboard Japan)	18
Lithuanian Albums (AGATA)	74
New Zealand Albums (RMNZ)	1
Norwegian Albums (VG-lista)	7
Polish Albums (ZPAV)	1
Portuguese Albums (AFP)	7
Scottish Albums (Official Charts)	3
Slovak Albums (ČNS IFPI)	6
Spanish Albums (Promusicae)	7
Swedish Albums (Sverigetopplistan)	3
Swiss Albums (Schweizer Hitparade)	1
UK Albums (Official Charts)	1
US Billboard 200	5

=== Year-end charts ===
Chart (2025)	Position
Australian Albums (ARIA)	46
Austrian Albums (Ö3 Austria)	44
Belgian Albums (Ultratop Flanders)	65
Belgian Albums (Ultratop Wallonia)	148
Croatian International Albums (HDU)	10
Dutch Albums (Album Top 100)	65
French Albums (SNEP)	96
German Albums (Offizielle Top 100)	34
Hungarian Physical Albums (MAHASZ)	34
New Zealand Albums (RMNZ)	37
Swiss Albums (Schweizer Hitparade)	38
UK Albums (OCC)	47

== Certifications ==
Certifications for Play
Region	Certification	Certified units/sales
Denmark (IFPI Danmark)	Gold	10,000^{‡}
France (SNEP)	Gold	50,000^{‡}
New Zealand (RMNZ)	Platinum	15,000^{‡}
United Kingdom (BPI)	Gold	100,000^{‡}
^{‡} Sales+streaming figures based on certification alone.

== Release history ==
Region	Date	Format(s)	Edition(s)	Label	Ref.
Various	12 September 2025	Cassette; CD; digital download; streaming; vinyl LP	Standard	Gingerbread Man; Atlantic	
Various	12 September 2025	CD; vinyl LP	Deluxe	Gingerbread Man; Atlantic	
Various	12 September 2025	CD	Japanese	Gingerbread Man; Atlantic	
Various	12 September 2025	Digital download; streaming	Extended	Gingerbread Man; Atlantic	
Various	12 September 2025	Digital download; streaming	Amazon Music extended	Gingerbread Man; Atlantic	
Various	12 September 2025	Digital download; streaming	Portman Road	Gingerbread Man; Atlantic	
Various	28 November 2025	Digital download; streaming; vinyl LP	Deluxe (27 tracks)	Gingerbread Man; Atlantic	
