= Łatwogang =

Polish singer and social media influencer (born 2003)

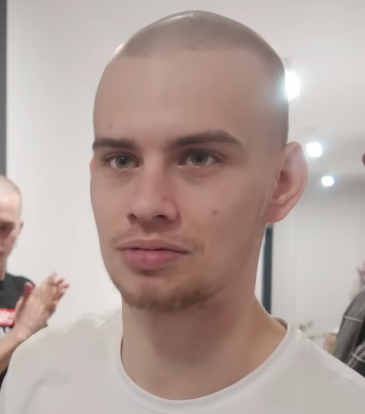
- Hancke in 2026
- Born: Piotr Artur Hancke; 28 March 2003 (age 23); Warsaw, Poland
- Occupations: Singer, social media influencer

Instagram information
- Page: latwogang
- Years active: 2021–present
- Followers: 1.9 million

TikTok information
- Page: Latwogang
- Years active: 2021–present
- Followers: 3.2 million

YouTube information
- Channel: Latwogang
- Years active: 2022–present
- Subscribers: 1.42 million
- Views: 162 million
- Last updated: 28 July 2026

Piotr Artur Hancke (born 28 March 2003), known professionally as Łatwogang, is a Polish singer and social media influencer. He is best known for raising over US$76 million for the Cancer Fighters Foundation in his nine-day livestream on YouTube.

== Life and career ==
Hancke was born in Warsaw. His mother works as an accountant at the construction company Budimex. He briefly attended the University of Warsaw, before dropping out to focus on his online career.

In 2021, Hancke created his YouTube channel, uploading his first video I Took 111,000 Steps in 24 Hours on 13 October 2022. In 2023, he collaborated with rapper Quebonafide, and released the songs "Wszystko jest dla ludzi", and "Friendzone", which he sang with Roksana Węgiel. On 9 October 2025, he released the Polish version of the song "Azizam" with Ed Sheeran.

=== 2026 charities ===
In April 2026, Hancke held a nine-day YouTube livestream to help raise money for Cancer Fighters Foundation, a Polish charitable organization that provides financial, psychological, and organizational support to individuals affected by cancer, during which he listened to Bedoes's promotional song for the charity. The livestream included appearances from Chris Martin, Wojciech Szczęsny, Iga Świątek and Robert Lewandowski, garnering national significant attention and raising over US$76 million.

In May 2026, Łatwogang cycled from Zakopane to Gdańsk, successfully raising 12 million PLN needed by a family of an 8 year old boy for a Duchenne muscular dystrophy therapy. The required sum has been collected before Hancke reached Gdańsk. Through the remaining 177 km he raised 3.5 million PLN.

== Discography ==
=== Singles ===
==== As lead artist ====
Title	Year	Peak chart positions		Album
Title	Year	POL Air.	POL Stream.	Album
"Wszystko jest dla ludzi"	2023	—	—	Non-album singles
"Roxi Węgiel"	2023	—	—	Non-album singles
"Friendzone" (featuring Roxie Węgiel)	2023	—	—	Non-album singles
"Kończy się film" (featuring Alberto)	2023	—	—	Non-album singles
"Letniak" (featuring Bambi)	2023	—	—	Non-album singles
"Magda, Kaśka, Marta" (with Jędrzej Wise)	2024	—	—	Non-album singles
"Azizam" (with Ed Sheeran)	2025	16	11	Non-album singles
"Wszystkie marzenia" (with Majko and Cancer Fighters)	2026	34	—	Non-album singles
"—" denotes a recording that did not chart or was not released in that territory.
