= Bad Idea (Ariana Grande song) =

2019 song by Ariana Grande

Song by Ariana Grande

from the album Thank U, Next
- Released: February 8, 2019
- Studio: MXM (Los Angeles); Wolf Cousins (Stockholm)
- Genre: New wave; electropop; electro-trap
- Length: 4:27
- Label: Republic
- Songwriters: Ariana Grande; Max Martin; Ilya Salmanzadeh; Peter Svensson; Savan Kotecha
- Producers: Max Martin; Ilya

Audio video
- "Bad Idea" on YouTube

"Bad Idea" (stylized in all lowercase) is a song performed by the American singer-songwriter Ariana Grande from her fifth studio album Thank U, Next (2019). The track was written by Grande, Peter Svensson, Savan Kotecha, and its producers Max Martin and Ilya Salmanzadeh. It is a new wave, electropop, and electro-trap song with EDM influences in which Grande talks about using someone to recover from a previous relationship.

Some critics praised the track's composition, while others found it too similar to Gotye and Kimbra's "Somebody That I Used to Know". Following the release of Thank U, Next, "Bad Idea" reached the top ten in Greece, Hungary, Lithuania and Slovakia. It peaked in the top 30 in Australia, Canada, Denmark, Ireland, Portugal, Singapore, and the United States. Grande included the track on the set list of her Sweetener World Tour in 2019. That year, she performed it at the Coachella Valley Music and Arts Festival and Lollapalooza.

== Background ==
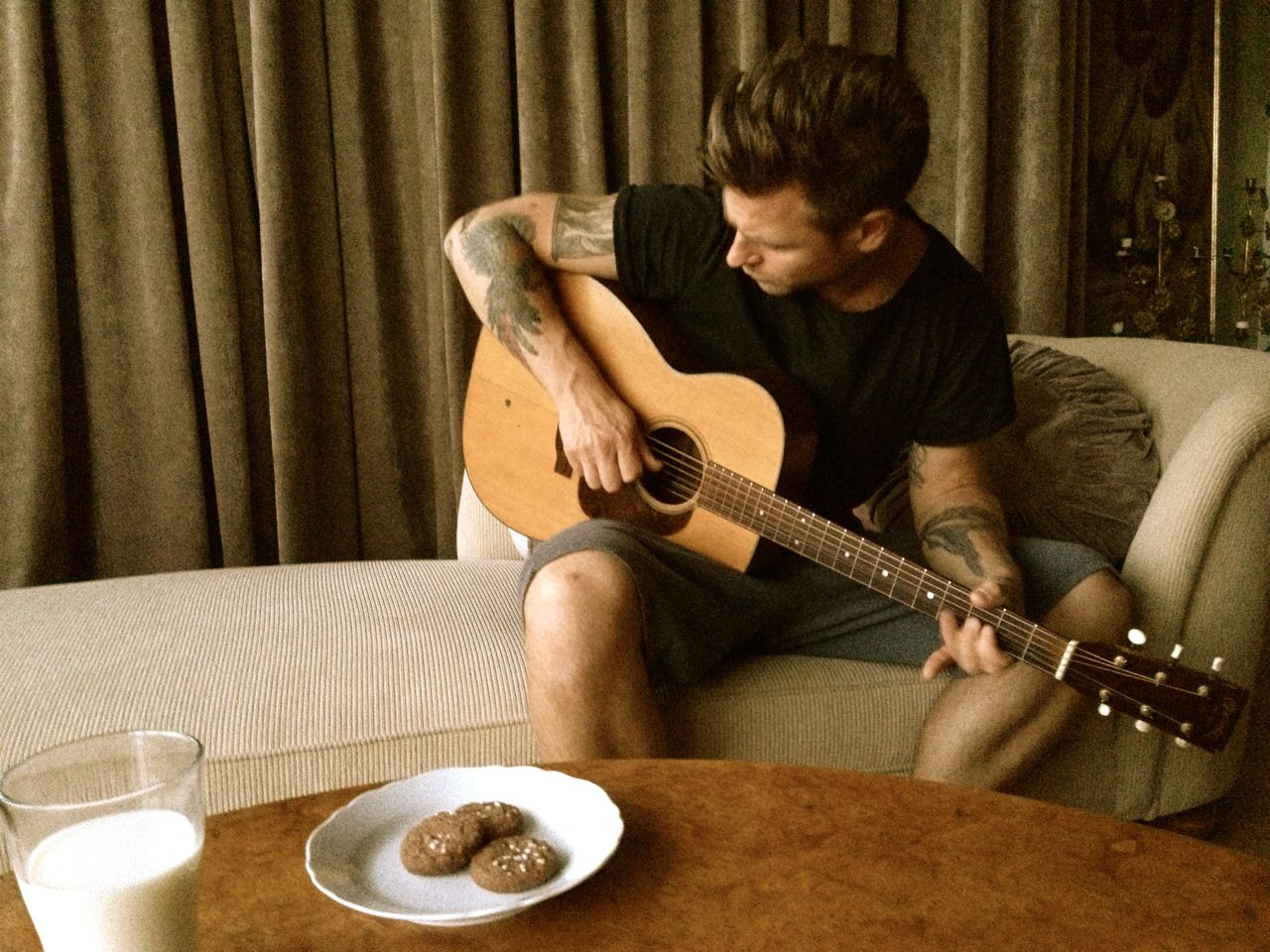
Peter Svensson co-wrote "Bad Idea".

"Bad Idea" was written by Ariana Grande, Peter Svensson, Savan Kotecha and its producers Max Martin and Ilya Salmanzadeh. The recording took place in two studios—MXM Studios in Los Angeles, California, and the Wolf Cousins Studios located in Stockholm, Sweden. According to Kotecha, during the development of Thank U, Next, they tried to do different things that Grande had not done before. In line with this idea, he wanted to create a song with a melody inspired by British band The Police combined with a trap beat. Svensson, a former member of the band the Cardigans, helped with the phrasing of the second line and created the guitar riff at the beginning of the track with Ilya. Later, Kotecha, Grande and Martin fixed the melodies. Ilya added the instrumental outro, which Grande decided to extend.

Martin and Salmanzadeh programmed the track and played the guitar, bass, drums and keyboards. Both were also part of the string section, playing the strings with Mattias Bylund; David Bukovinsky played the cello. Mattias Johansson, who worked with Grande on her third studio album Dangerous Woman, played the violin. Grande produced the vocals. Sam Holland engineered the song with the help of Cory Byce and Jeremy Lertola. Serban Ghenea mixed it with the assistance of John Hanes at MixStar Studios in Virginia Beach, Virginia. Randy Merrill mastered it at Sterling Sound Studios in New York City.

== Composition ==
Musically, "Bad Idea" is a new wave, electropop, and electro-trap song with EDM influences, and runs for a length of four minutes and twenty-seven seconds. It is written in the key of E-flat minor and set in common time signature, with a moderately fast tempo of 138 beats per minute. Grande's vocals span from the low note of E♭_{3} to the high note of A♭_{5}. "Bad Idea" begins with a guitar riff and has a "melodic turn" in the hook, with ad-libs and echoes. A vocal inflection is used when Grande sings the song's title. She also calls herself "Ari-chan" during the chorus. This was a reference to her admiration of Japanese culture according to Rachel Handler of Vulture and Mekishana Pierre of PopSugar. An orchestral arrangement begins during the second chorus, leading to the third chorus where the singer performs the title using two higher notes. The song ends with a chopped and screwed outro with Grande's vocals slowed down and pitched.

In the lyrics, Grande talks about using someone to recover from a previous relationship, as indicated in the chorus, "Yeah, I'ma call you over here to numb the pain / I got a bad idea, forget about it, yeah, forget about him, yeah / Forget about me." Raúl Guillén of the Spanish website Jenesaispop noted that during the second verse the singer is "desperate" to numb the pain with somebody who does not expect commitment from her. "Need somebody, gimme something I can feel / But, boy, don't trip, you know this isn't real / You should know I'm temporary". Publications including The Indianapolis Star, The Atlantic and The Hollywood Reporter found similarities between the track and "Somebody That I Used to Know" by Gotye and Kimbra. Sleeping With Sirens guitarist Nick Martin also noted the similarities between both songs via his Twitter account.

== Critical reception ==
In his 2019 article "Every Ariana Grande Song, Ranked: Critic's Picks", Richard S. He of Billboard ranked the song number 32 on the list. Elle's Estelle Tang said "Bad Idea" is the best song on Thank U, Next, while Juan Manuel Pairone of La Voz del Interior compared it with the music of American singer Taylor Swift. Out's Mathew Rodriquez wrote: "It's a given that Grande can sang, but 'Bad Idea' serves as a reminder that she's not just a singer who can belt, she's a vocalist who can interpret." He added the track featured "the most dynamic vocals on the album". Jon Caramanica of The New York Times wrote the track is "crisp" and has "the urgency and cool of early 1980s pop". Kitty Empire of The Guardian called the song "intriguing" and "minx-ish" and added that it "reintroduces the idea of Grande as a dangerous woman". Raúl Guillén of Jenesaispop wrote a detailed article about the song. In it, he praised its composition, the orchestral arrangements, ad-libs and hook. He noted the track's importance on the album, saying it "shines immediately" and that it is one of the best moments on the album. He finished his review noting the song demonstrated that Grande's collaborations with Max Martin are still "a good idea". In 2022, Ilana Kaplan of Rolling Stone named “Bad Idea” the fourth best song in Grande’s discography.

In a more mixed review, Jonny Coleman of The Hollywood Reporter compared it with Gotye and Kimbra's "Somebody That I Used to Know", saying its "bizarre orchestral trap breakdown" was a "pretty bad idea". Spencer Kornhaber of The Atlantic said "Bad Idea" had the potential to become a pop hit, however, he considered the track a copy of Gotye's "Somebody That I Used to Know". Kristin Smith selected the song's themes among the "objectionable content" on Thank U, Next.

== Commercial performance ==
On February 12, 2019, a few days after the release of Thank U, Next, "Bad Idea" was the ninth most-streamed song worldwide on Spotify and one of eight tracks by Grande inside the top 11 on the platform's global chart. "Bad Idea" eventually entered a number of countries' charts. The track debuted at number 27 on the February 23, 2019, US Billboard Hot 100; it was one of eleven songs by Grande to chart that week in the first 40 positions. With this, the singer became the female artist with the most tracks to appear simultaneously in the top 40 in one issue, surpassing Cardi B, who had nine songs on the chart on April 21, 2018. The following week, it fell to number 55. "Bad Idea" entered the February 23, 2019, Canadian Hot 100 at number 22. The next week, it dropped to number 51.

In Greece, "Bad Idea" debuted at number nine on the sixth edition of the 2019 Digital Singles Chart International. The following week, it peaked at number eight. In the next edition, it had fallen to number 17. It spent a total of five weeks on the chart. In Slovakia, "Bad Idea" entered at number nine on the Singles Digitál Top 100 during the seventh week of 2019. In the next edition, it dropped to number 36. In Hungary, the song debuted at numbers nine and 40 on the February 14, 2019, Streaming and Sales charts, respectively. The next week, it fell to number 28 on the former, and dropped off the latter. In Ireland, "Bad Idea" entered the Irish Singles Chart at number 13 on February 22, 2019. The following week, it fell to number 20. In the United Kingdom, the track appeared at numbers 12 and 54 on the Audio Streaming and Download charts, respectively, on February 15, 2019. The following week, it fell to number 21 on the Audio Streaming chart, and dropped off the Download chart. On the February 16, 2019, chart "Bad Idea" debuted at number 21 on the Australian ARIA Singles Chart. The next week, it fell twenty-one positions to number 42. In Lithuania, "Bad Idea" debuted at number 7 on the Singlų Top 100.

== Live performances and remix ==
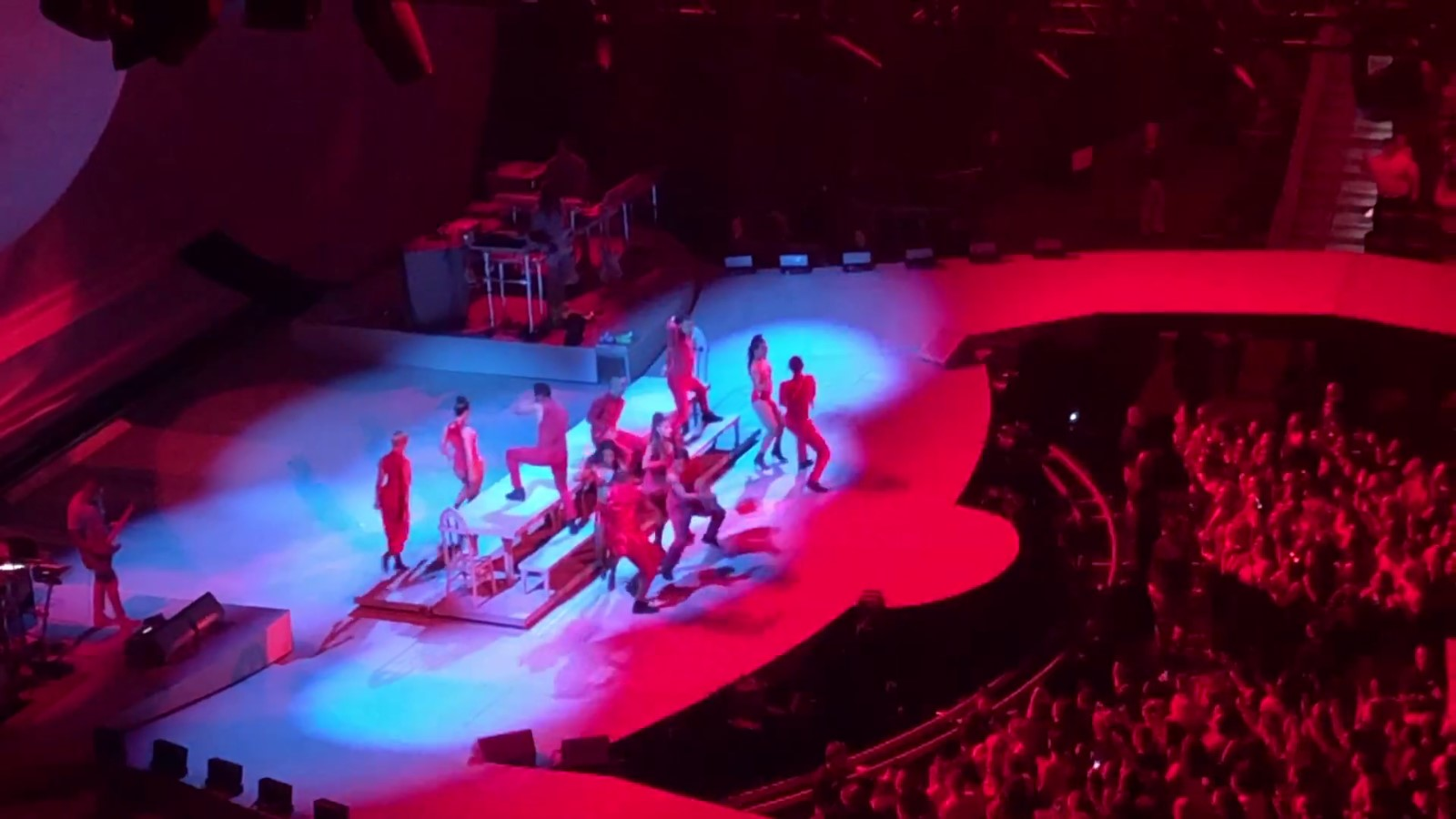
Ariana Grande performing "Bad Idea" on the Sweetener World Tour in 2019

"Bad Idea" was included on the set list of Grande's Sweetener World Tour, which started in 2019. While performing the track, the singer wore a red latex outfit (later a purple outfit), with opaque, red lights projected onto the stage as she danced with back-up dancers. The choreography showed her reject a man and hug a woman. Brittany Spanos of Rolling Stone wrote Grande used "playful, narrative-heavy choreography and played into a more villainous, dangerous side of herself." Celia Almedia of the Miami New Times reviewed the show at the American Airlines Arena in Miami, saying that Grande performed the track with "high energy", but noted she "struggled to stand out amidst a sea of backup dancers, props, and ham-fisted dance routines". Almedia also pointed out that Grande was a more talented vocalist than dancer. David Lindquist of The Indianapolis Star said the singer opened up "the top of her vocal range in ways rarely encountered at an arena show" during her concert at the Bankers Life Fieldhouse in Indianapolis.

Grande performed "Bad Idea" at the Coachella Valley Music and Arts Festival during the first weekend of the 2019 edition. She performed the song third, after "Raindrops (An Angel Cried)" and "God Is a Woman", on a dark and space-themed setting surrounded by back-up dancers. John Flynn of Consequence of Sound noted her performance of the three tracks did not grab the attention of the public, who were mostly watching the singer through their iPhones. Mikael Wood of the Los Angeles Times said her back-up dancers whirled "as profanely as any NIN fan could want". Refinery29's Courtney E. Smith said "Bad Ideas" "started the first half of a show that didn't have the hallmarks of the average pop concert. The stage setting was surprisingly dark and space-themed while [Grande] blends into her dancers with no glamour spotlight, just the lights reflecting off the highlighter that runs in a sharp line down her cheekbones." A live rendition of the song on the tour was included on Grande's first live album, K Bye for Now (SWT Live) (2019).

Grande performed "Bad Idea" as her second song at the Lollapalooza 2019 concert in Chicago. There she experienced some difficulties, nearly falling as she was coming down from an elevated platform and later being unable to sing the track with her headset. However, she resumed her performance using a handheld microphone and joined her back-up dancers for a choreographed piece. Piet Levy of the Milwaukee Journal Sentinel complimented the singer's handling of the situation, saying that her "incredible cool under pressure demonstrated why Grande is one of our most polished pop stars right now."

"Bad Idea" has been remixed by Eddie Martinez. Michael Cook of Instinct wrote a positive review, saying the remix had a "darker and heavier" house style than the original version and that it was suitable for nightclubs.

== Credits and personnel ==
Credits adapted from the liner notes of Thank U, Next and Tidal.

Locations

- Recorded at MXM Studios in Los Angeles, California, and the Wolf Cousins Studios in Stockholm, Sweden.
- Mixed at MixStar Studios in Virginia Beach, Virginia.
- Mastered at Sterling Sound Studios in New York City.

Personnel

- Lead vocals – Ariana Grande
- Songwriting – Ariana Grande, Peter Svensson, Savan Kotecha, Max Martin, Ilya Salmanzadeh
- Production – Max Martin, Ilya Salmanzadeh
- Programming – Max Martin, Ilya Salmanzadeh
- Mixing – Serban Ghenea
- Mixing assistance – John Hanes
- Engineering – Sam Holland
- Engineering assistance – Cory Byce, Jeremy Lertola
- Mastering – Randy Merrill
- Vocal production – Ariana Grande
- Guitars – Max Martin, Ilya Salmanzadeh
- Bass – Max Martin, Ilya Salmanzadeh
- Drums – Max Martin, Ilya Salmanzadeh
- Keyboards – Max Martin, Ilya Salmanzadeh
- String section – Max Martin, Ilya Salmanzadeh, Mattias Bylund
- Violin – Mattias Johansson
- Cello – David Bukovinsky
- Strings – Mattias Bylund

== Charts ==
Chart performance for "Bad Idea"
Chart (2019)	Peak position
Australia (ARIA)	21
Canada Hot 100 (Billboard)	22
Czech Republic (Singles Digitál Top 100)	19
Denmark (Tracklisten)	30
France (SNEP)	105
Germany (GfK)	52
Greece International (IFPI)	8
Hungary (Single Top 40)	40
Hungary (Stream Top 40)	9
Ireland (IRMA)	13
Latvia (LAIPA)	14
Lithuania (AGATA)	7
Netherlands (Single Top 100)	43
Portugal (AFP)	22
Scottish Singles Sales (Official Charts)	62
Singapore (RIAS)	24
Slovakia (Singles Digitál Top 100)	9
Spain (Promusicae)	66
Sweden (Sverigetopplistan)	41
UK Singles Downloads (Official Charts)	54
UK Audio Streaming (Official Charts)	12
US Billboard Hot 100	27

== Certifications ==
Certifications for "Bad Idea"
Region	Certification	Certified units/sales
Australia (ARIA)	Platinum	70,000^{‡}
Brazil (Pro-Música Brasil)	2× Platinum	80,000^{‡}
New Zealand (RMNZ)	Gold	15,000^{‡}
United Kingdom (BPI)	Silver	200,000^{‡}
United States (RIAA)	Platinum	1,000,000^{‡}
^{‡} Sales+streaming figures based on certification alone.
