= Old Phone =

Single by Ed Sheeran

from the album Play
- B-side: "Rapture"
- Released: 1 May 2025
- Length: 3:41
- Label: Gingerbread Man; Atlantic
- Songwriter: Ed Sheeran
- Producers: Ed Sheeran; Ilya; Blake Slatkin

Ed Sheeran singles chronology
"Azizam" (2025)	"Old Phone" (2025)	"Sapphire" (2025)

Music video
- "Old Phone" on YouTube

"Old Phone" is a song by English singer-songwriter Ed Sheeran. It was released on 1 May 2025 by Gingerbread Man and Atlantic Records, as the second single from his eighth studio album, Play. The track was written by Sheeran and produced by Sheeran, Ilya Salmanzadeh and Blake Slatkin. The limited edition 7-inch single includes exclusive bonus track "Rapture". Sheeran performed "Old Phone" during the 2025 European leg of his +−=÷× Tour. The song peaked at numbers 17 in the United Kingdom and 38 in Ireland.

== Background ==
In April 2025, Sheeran launched a new Instagram account to celebrate his upcoming single "Old Phone". The account features a number of never-before-seen pictures, texts and lyric notes, a look back through Sheeran's mobile phone that he retired in 2015. He was inspired to write the new song when revisiting his recovered old phone, after winning the "Thinking Out Loud" copyright lawsuit.

== Music video ==
The Emil Nava-directed music video was released on 8 May 2025. It features Sheeran's pop-up Ipswich, Massachusetts pub gig (filmed on 28 March 2025), as well as similar locations around the Cape Ann area, and also fans who submitted stories from their past.

== Track listing ==
- Digital and streaming single
1. "Old Phone" – 3:41
- 7-inch single
1. "Old Phone" – 3:41
2. "Rapture" – 3:21 (non-album track; written and produced by Sheeran, Blake Slatkin and Omer Fedi)

== Credits and personnel ==
Credits adapted from Tidal.

- Ed Sheeran – songwriting, production, lead vocals, guitar
- Ilya Salmanzadeh – production, keyboards, backing vocals, programming, engineering
- Blake Slatkin – production, keyboards, backing vocals, programming, engineering
- Beoga – banjo, piano, strings
- Pino Palladino – bass
- Davide Rossi – cello, viola, violin, strings arranger
- Gautam Sharma – dhol, percussion, tambourine
- Lemar Carter – drums
- Ganesh Murali – ghatam, tambourine
- Jayesh Kathak – güiro, khartal, shaker, tambourine
- Dylan Day – guitar
- Tapas Ray – mandolin
- Elvira Anderfjärd – backing vocals
- Graham Archer – engineering
- Jeremy Lertola – engineering
- Michael Harris – engineering
- Mark "Spike" Stent – mixing
- Bryce Bordone – assistant mixing engineer
- Matt Wolach – assistant mixing engineer
- Stuart Hawkes – mastering

== Charts ==
=== Weekly charts ===
Weekly chart performance for "Old Phone"
Chart (2025)	Peak position
Argentina Anglo Airplay (Monitor Latino)	8
Australia Digital Tracks (ARIA)	4
Bolivia Anglo Airplay (Monitor Latino)	6
Canada Hot 100 (Billboard)	60
Canada Hot AC (Billboard)	40
Croatia International Airplay (Top lista)	13
Czech Republic Airplay (ČNS IFPI)	25
Global 200 (Billboard)	75
Ireland (IRMA)	38
Japan Hot Overseas (Billboard)	5
Lebanon (Lebanese Top 20)	6
Lithuania Airplay (TopHit)	24
Netherlands (Single Tip)	4
New Zealand Hot Singles (RMNZ)	5
North Macedonia Airplay (Radiomonitor)	7
Norway (VG-lista)	54
Paraguay Anglo Airplay (Monitor Latino)	10
Peru Anglo Airplay (Monitor Latino)	13
Romania Airplay (TopHit)	82
South Korea BGM (Circle)	50
South Korea Download (Circle)	91
Sweden (Sverigetopplistan)	62
Switzerland (Schweizer Hitparade)	61
UK Singles (OCC)	17
US Billboard Hot 100	89
US Adult Pop Airplay (Billboard)	35
Venezuela Airplay (Record Report)	41

=== Monthly charts ===
Monthly chart performance for "Old Phone"
Chart (2025)	Peak position
Lithuania Airplay (TopHit)	62
Romania Airplay (TopHit)	90

== Certifications ==
Certifications for "Old Phone"
Region	Certification	Certified units/sales
United Kingdom (BPI)	Silver	200,000^{‡}
^{‡} Sales+streaming figures based on certification alone.

== Release history ==
Release history for "Old Phone"
Region	Date	Format	Version	Label	Ref.
Various	1 May 2025	Digital download; streaming	Original	Gingerbread Man; Atlantic	
Various	11 July 2025	7-inch	Original	Gingerbread Man; Atlantic	
