= 2026 Cancer Fighters charity livestream =

2026 Polish charity livestream

The 2026 Cancer Fighters charity livestream was a nine-day continuous livestream. held on YouTube in 2026 to raise funds for the Cancer Fighters Foundation, a Polish non-profit organization supporting children and families affected by cancer. The event attracted significant media attention in Poland and internationally and raised over 292 million PLN (over US$76M).

== Background ==
The livestream was reportedly inspired by the song “Ciągle tutaj jestem (diss na raka)”, recorded by Polish rapper Bedoes 2115 together with Maja Mecan, an 11-year-old patient of the Cancer Fighters Foundation diagnosed with acute myeloid leukemia. The song gained widespread online attention for portraying the experience of cancer from the perspective of a child and their family.

Following the release and viral spread of the song, Polish internet creators organized a large-scale charity initiative in support of the Cancer Fighters Foundation, a non-profit organization established in 2015 that provides financial, psychological, and logistical support to people affected by cancer, as well as funding treatment, rehabilitation, and hospital equipment.

On 17 April 2026, Łatwogang launched a continuous livestream on YouTube as part of the fundraising campaign. The stream ran uninterrupted for nine days and featured a looped music format alongside donation-driven milestones. All proceeds were directed to the Cancer Fighters Foundation.

== Format, participants and outcome ==
The livestream was broadcast continuously on YouTube for nine days. The content consisted of live interaction, donation-based challenges, and scheduled segments triggered by fundraising milestones. The stream maintained a single continuous broadcast format throughout its duration.

The livestream raised 292,738,293.05zł for the Cancer Fighters Foundation. According to organizers, the funds were allocated toward medical treatment support, rehabilitation, psychological care, and equipment for hospitals treating children with cancer.

The livestream included appearances by various public figures, including musicians, athletes, and entertainers, including Robert Lewandowski and Chris Martin. The event received coverage in Polish and international media, which highlighted its scale and its use of livestreaming as a fundraising method.

== Reception and impact ==
The livestream was widely discussed as an example of large-scale digital charity fundraising. Commentators noted its influence on the growing trend of long-form livestream events used for philanthropic purposes.

The event also contributed to increased visibility of the Cancer Fighters Foundation and inspired similar online charity initiatives.
