= Repeat It (Martin Garrix and Ed Sheeran song) =

Single by Martin Garrix and Ed Sheeran
- Released: 15 May 2026
- Recorded: 2014
- Studio: Cypher Sound (Kansas City, Missouri)
- Genre: Dance-pop; EDM
- Length: 3:12
- Label: Stmpd
- Songwriters: Martijn Gerard Garritsen; Amy Victoria Wadge; Edward Christopher Sheeran
- Producers: Martin Garrix; Mesto; Osrin

Martin Garrix singles chronology
"Catharina" (2026)	"Repeat It" (2026)	"Fireflies" (2026)

Ed Sheeran singles chronology
"Camera" (2025)	"Repeat It" (2026)

Music video
- "Repeat It" on YouTube

"Repeat It" (formerly known as "Rewind Repeat It" (Note: While some sources stylised the title as "Rewind, Repeat It" with the words "Rewind" and "Repeat" separated by a comma, the Songview entry only shows "Rewind Repeat It" as one of the alternative titles without any punctuation marks.), and also as "Replay Rewind", "Repeat Rewind" or "Rewind Repeated") is a song by Dutch DJ and record producer Martin Garrix and English singer-songwriter Ed Sheeran. The dance-pop song was written by Garrix, Sheeran and English singer-songwriter Amy Wadge, with production handled by Garrix, Dutch DJ and record producer Mesto, and Swedish record producer Osrin.

Initially recorded in 2014 during a studio session in Nashville, Tennessee, it premiered in 2015 as part of Garrix's DJ set at Ultra Music Festival, and he performed the first versions of the song in his shows during 2015 to 2017. While it had originally been targeted for official release between late 2015 to early 2016, Garrix publicly stated in 2017 that the song would remain unreleased for an indefinite period of time, ascribing the impasse to conflicts with both artists' record labels.

Following a months-long promotional campaign and media reports indicating the song's imminent arrival, a new version featuring a variation in production was released by Stmpd Rcrds on 15 May 2026 as a single from Garrix's upcoming second studio album, over 12 years after the track was first recorded. An acoustic version was released on 19 June 2026, while the original mix from 2015 was made available commercially on 26 June 2026.

== Background and development ==
=== Initial announcement ===
On 26 March 2014, Garrix first teased an upcoming collaboration with Sheeran during a press conference at Miami's Nikki Beach club as part of Miami Music Week alongside his manager Scooter Braun and Eelko van Kooten, a label executive from Spinnin' Records. He said the song had recently been recorded and was still being completed, while his management team noted that its release depended on approval from Sheeran's label, Atlantic Records.

In a video interview with FaceCulture on 4 June 2014, Garrix shared that he is "working on a new track which is almost done with Ed Sheeran". He said that it was a pleasure for him to work with Sheeran, and also provided more details on the collaborative process:

"I met him in Los Angeles and we started talking and hanging out and I sent him a core progression, like not even a whole track, but just a core progression with like synths and he came back with an amazing top line on it and right now I'm finishing the track around it which is almost done and then we're going to check how we can release it and put it out."

He also noted the challenges he faced while working on the song: "I learned how to work more with a poppy vocal, like a different kind of vocal, like me as a house artist is not really used to a vocal like what he gave to me and it was very challenging but I'm super excited for the track."

On 1 September 2014, Sheeran announced that the collaboration was nearing completion when he posted to Instagram a picture of him and Garrix taken at Cypher Sound Studio in Kansas City, writing: "Finished up my very first EDM song with Martin Garrix, brilliant experience, looking forward to you all hearing it." The pair had previously worked on the track in a Nashville studio together.

=== Public debut ===
On 28 March 2015, Garrix played the song publicly for the first time during his live set on the mainstage at Ultra Music Festival in Miami.

Following the song's debut at Ultra, Garrix told MTV News in April 2015 that many people initially considered the collaboration unusual because Sheeran was not associated with dance music. He said the project challenged both artists to merge their different musical styles and that they were ultimately pleased with the outcome. Garrix recalled that after meeting in Los Angeles they exchanged musical ideas and quickly developed the basis of the track together, adding that Sheeran later sent him a voice note containing a melody that eventually became the song's completed top line. Garrix also revealed that he was considering releasing two versions of the track: a softer version and another aimed more toward festivals.

At Capital's Summertime Ball in June 2015, Garrix played the track again during his DJ set. In an interview with Capital in April 2015, Garrix praised Sheeran's vocal ability, songwriting talent, and personality, describing him as one of the most talented and enjoyable collaborators he had worked with. Garrix also discussed his relationship with Sheeran in an interview with Teen Vogue in May 2015, where he described Sheeran, Ansel Elgort, and Tiësto as talented yet grounded people in an industry where humility was uncommon.

During video interviews with PopCrush and Kiss in May 2015, Garrix revealed that he and Sheeran had met in the studio three times to complete the track and record guitar parts. He also said that Sheeran originally sent the demo top line through WhatsApp. Asked whether the song would be released as a single, Garrix said the decision depended on the labels and scheduling considerations.

In October 2015, Garrix told DJ Mag that he and Sheeran were in the studio two weeks prior, and that they had "properly finished the tune," adding: "It's getting released in December [of 2015] or January [of 2016]." He also reflected on the unique nature of this collaboration, saying:

"He'd never made a dance record, and at that time I'd never done a vocal track. Right now I've done 'Gold Skies', but when I met him I was only making instrumental stuff. It was interesting for him to work with an electronic artist, 'cause he'd never worked with a producer in my genre before, and for me it was really interesting because he's from a completely different scene. I'm really excited by the result."

Garrix continued to perform variations of the song during his mainstage sets at Ultra Music Festival 2016 and 2017. By the end of 2018, he stopped playing the song live.

=== Label conflicts ===
In an interview with Radio 538 in March 2017, Garrix suggested that the song may not be released, saying:

"It's all label issues and a lot of headaches, it was going to be an official track, so we postponed all my other singles, but the label delayed the track because they wanted to release other tracks from Ed first. At one point, it was two years ago, I didn't release a radio single for five, six months. So, then you get annoyed. So, I don't think we're ever going to release the track."

Following Garrix's comments, fans launched an online petition calling for the song's release on Change.org.

In August 2017, the song was discovered on the American Society of Composers, Authors and Publishers' royalties website, known as the ASCAP Clearance Express (ACE) Repertory, with its Songview entry showing "Replay Rewind" as the primary title, while "Rewind Repeat It" and "Repeat Rewind" were listed as alternative titles.

At the premiere for What We Started during the Winter Music Conference in 2018, Garrix attributed the song's unreleased status to contractual complications related to his former label, Spinnin'. He said the track had been created under his previous contract before he became independent in 2016 through his own label, Stmpd Rcrds, and expressed frustration over the parties involved in the agreement.

In February 2019, the full song was leaked online, along with multiple other unreleased tracks of Garrix's.

=== Reworked version ===
During an interview with CKIS-FM on 3 June 2026, Garrix revealed that the song's ultimate release was prompted by him revisiting unreleased material while working on the upcoming studio album. He acknowledged in an interview with CIDC-FM on 6 June 2026 that "Repeat It" is one of the most requested unreleased songs of his. "I was going through basically all of the songs that I've ever made, which 98% of those songs are unreleased, so I made this huge database basically with all the songs that I've ever written, and it starts very early on with 'Repeat It,'" he recounted, adding that he sent Sheeran an email message at the end of 2025 along with a reworked version of the song which featured new guitars and a variation in production but maintained the same melodies, lyrics and vocals from the original demo. Sheeran praised the new version and told Garrix that he had been thinking of the song occasionally, and agreed to officially release the song.

In an interview with WHTZ on 25 June 2026, Garrix said that the new version of the song is more acoustic, while the two versions he made in 2015 and 2016 were a bit more "aggressive EDM". He called the reworked version "a better blend of Martin Garrix and Ed Sheeran in 2026" with more acoustic guitars and violin that resembles Sheeran's sound while also incorporating Garrix's orchestral styles.

== Release and promotion ==
On 31 October 2025, Garrix posted a photo on Instagram of him and Sheeran alongside a caption comprising a repeat button emoji. Prior to the post, Garrix also replied with an eyes emoji to a Reddit discussion about the song's release.

In March 2026, Garrix and Sheeran were spotted together on the streets of New York City filming a music video with a production crew, with images showing them posing for photos on the Brooklyn Bridge, as well as videos in which they were seen in the Oculus building at Westfield World Trade Center walking together in a backwards motion from the camera, a direct reference to the "rewind" theme of the song.

On 17 April 2026, Garrix played a short snippet of a new, reworked version of the song during a live broadcast on Instagram.

On 22 April 2026, The Sun reported that Sheeran planned to release the song as a single in May 2026. According to an unnamed insider cited by the newspaper, the track had been slightly reworked from the version played at Ultra in 2015 to make it more radio-friendly. The source also claimed that the song, originally titled "Rewind, Repeat It", had been shortened to "Repeat It". The insider added: "Lyrically, it's a classic Ed love song set to a dance beat."

On 28 April 2026, Sheeran posted a series of photos on Instagram, one of which shows him and Garrix playing guitars in a hotel room. He wrote in the post's caption: "Caught up with [Garrix] recently, know that guy for over a decade now, I love him, what a bloke," while Garrix replied "give the people what they want", along with rewind button emojis.

On 1 May 2026, Garrix played the new version of the song at The Pavillion in Toyota Music Factory in Dallas for the opening show of his Americas tour. Ahead of Sheeran's concert in Santo Domingo as part of his Loop Tour on 9 May 2026, billboards around Estadio Quisqueya displayed short messages addressed to Sheeran and signed by Garrix asking for the song to be released, which reads: "hi ed, can we please release our song? xx marty". During the show, Sheeran played an acoustic version of the song live for the first time.

On 10 May 2026, Garrix shared a video on Instagram of him jumping on Sheeran's back, followed by a photo of the pair in the same pose 12 years ago. In another video posted, Garrix and Sheeran explained that the delayed release was due to them "overthinking everything".

On 14 May 2026, Garrix announced on social media that "Repeat It" would be released worldwide at midnight on 15 May 2026, marking his 30th birthday. In a statement following the single's release, Garrix said that announcing and releasing the single around his 30th birthday "feels incredibly special", calling it "honestly the best gift [he] could've wished for". He recounted that the song was started 12 years ago in Nashville, and admitted that he had genuinely believed it would never be officially released, adding:

"So to finally be here now feels really surreal, and I couldn't be more excited for people to hear the new version. Working with Ed has been so much fun. He's an incredible human, artist but also one of my dear friends from the industry. We've shared so many cool memories over the years. I'm really proud that we finally get to release this together, this song means a lot to both of us!"

Sheeran said in his statement that the song came about 12 years ago after he and Garrix made friends on a night out in Amsterdam, the latter's hometown. "He turns 30 today, and is putting out his debut album this year, so seemed like a better time than any to finally do it," he added, while acknowledging fans who left comments under his posts asking for the song. He wished happy birthday to Garrix, and "happy Repeat It day for everyone else," and encouraged supporters to enjoy the music video which contains clips from both of their lives over the last 12 years.

On 15 May 2026, Garrix announced on social media the upcoming release of the original mix from 2015 and an acoustic version of the song.

== Cover art ==
The single's cover artwork was designed by Australian-South African artist Werner Bronkhorst. The background is made of thick, dark, heavily textured paint strokes. In the center is a square of vibrant blue and black splattered paint, overlaid with a large, stylised repeat icon formed by thick, white, sweeping paint strokes resembling plaster. Standing on the white strokes are Garrix holding a laptop on the left side, and Sheeran playing an acoustic guitar on the right side.

In a post on Instagram, Bronkhorst revealed that this was his first album cover, with the video showing him painting the artwork by hand with brushes, digitally scanning the canvas, and delivering the final product to Garrix and Sheeran in person.

== Composition and production ==
"Repeat It" is a dance-pop and EDM song, with the new version featuring a guitar-driven verse and orchestral textures in the drop.

== Commercial performance ==
In the United States, "Repeat It" debuted at number four on the Billboard Hot Dance/Electronic Songs chart, marking Sheeran's first appearance on the list and Garrix's tenth top 10 song on the chart. It ties with Garrix's 2019 single "Summer Days" as his third-highest charting song after "Animals" and "In the Name of Love", both of which peaked at number three. On the sales-focused Dance Digital Song Sales chart, "Repeat It" entered at number 12, giving Sheeran his highest position on the chart since "Boa Me" peaked at number 20 in December 2017.

== Music video ==
The music video, released shortly after the single on 17 May 2026, was directed by Liam Pethick and filmed in Santiago. Produced in a nostalgic style, the video incorporates key moments from both Garrix's and Sheeran's lives in the years preceding the release of "Repeat It".

On 19 June 2026, a performance video for the acoustic version of the song was released. It was filmed on the helipad on the rooftop of W Santiago, where the two artists sat beside each other and played acoustic guitars underneath the cityscape.

== Live performances ==
On 15 May 2026, Garrix and Sheeran performed the song live for the first time together at Movistar Arena in Santiago, as part of a 40-minute back-to-back set during Garrix's Americas tour show in Chile.

On 12 June 2026, Garrix and Sheeran gave a live performance of the song at Barclays Center in Brooklyn, as part of a 30-minute back-to-back set during the second night of Garrix's Americas tour show in New York City.

On 27 June 2026, Garrix and Sheeran made a surprise appearance at a wedding reception for Tessa Kindelin and Brendan Harty held in the Grainger Sky Theater at the Adler Planetarium, after finishing their respective shows at Huntington Bank Pavilion and Soldier Field in Chicago, at the request of the bride's brother. They performed "Repeat It" live as the opening song of a 10-minute set. "It was incredible to watch them perform it live together, and the crowd absolutely loved it," Kindelin said in an interview with People. "During the song, Ed came out toward the crowd to dance with us, and he gave me a huge hug. I couldn't believe it."

== Track listing ==
- Digital download and streaming
1. "Repeat It" – 3:12
- Digital download and streaming – acoustic version
1. "Repeat It" (acoustic version) – 3:10
2. "Repeat It" – 3:12
- Digital download and streaming – 2015 version
1. "Repeat It" (2015 version) – 3:30
2. "Repeat It" – 3:12

== Credits and personnel ==
Credits are adapted from Tidal.

Original version

- Martin Garrix – songwriting, production, guitar, mastering, mixing, programming
- Ed Sheeran – songwriting, guitar, vocals
- Amy Wadge – songwriting
- Mesto – production, programming
- Osrin – production, programming
- Anton Pieëte – immersive mastering, immersive mixing
- Nino Frijmersum – immersive mastering, immersive mixing
- Peppe Folliero – mastering, mixing
- Mark Otten – guitars
- Frank van Essen – string section
- Aaron Connor – vocal engineering
- Josh Connolly – vocal engineering

Acoustic version

- Tom Martin – production, electric guitar, programming
- Polish: Piotr Bogutyn – acoustic guitar, electric guitar, twelve string acoustic guitar
- Giorgio Tuinfort – piano

2015 version

- Martin Garrix – songwriting, production, mastering, mixing, programming
- Ed Sheeran – songwriting, vocals
- Amy Wadge – songwriting

== Charts ==
=== Weekly charts ===
Weekly chart performance
Chart (2026)	Peak position
Argentina Anglo Airplay (Monitor Latino)	17
Australia Dance (ARIA)	12
Austria Airplay (MusicTrace)	2
Belarus Airplay (TopHit)	184
Belgium (Ultratop 50 Flanders)	22
Bolivia Anglo Airplay (Monitor Latino)	11
Canada Hot 100 (Billboard)	93
Canada AC (Billboard)	21
Canada CHR/Top 40 (Billboard)	31
Canada Hot AC (Billboard)	21
Chile Anglo Airplay (Monitor Latino)	7
Colombia Anglo Airplay (Monitor Latino)	17
CIS Airplay (TopHit)	50
Czech Republic Airplay (ČNS IFPI)	21
Denmark Airplay (Tracklisten)	14
Estonia Airplay (TopHit)	16
Finland Airplay (Radiosoittolista)	79
France Airplay (SNEP)	28
Germany Airplay (MusicTrace)	42
Hungary (Rádiós Top 40)	31
Italy Airplay (EarOne)	37
Japan Hot Overseas (Billboard Japan)	11
Latvia Airplay (LaIPA)	1
Lebanon (Lebanese Top 20)	14
Lithuania Airplay (TopHit)	4
Moldova Airplay (TopHit)	107
Netherlands (Dutch Top 40)	32
Netherlands (Single Tip)	6
Netherlands Airplay (Dutch Charts)	11
New Zealand Hot Singles (RMNZ)	16
North Macedonia Airplay (Radiomonitor)	1
Norway Airplay (IFPI Norge)	36
Peru Anglo Airplay (Monitor Latino)	17
Poland (Polish Airplay Top 100)	5
Romania Airplay (Media Forest)	12
San Marino Airplay (SMRTV Top 50)	37
Serbia Airplay (Radiomonitor)	9
Slovakia Airplay (ČNS IFPI)	2
Slovenia Airplay (Radiomonitor)	2
Switzerland Airplay (MusicTrace)	8
UK Singles (Official Charts)	85
UK Independent (Official Charts)	32
Uruguay Anglo Airplay (Monitor Latino)	14
US Adult Pop Airplay (Billboard)	16
US Dance Airplay (Billboard)	9
US Hot Dance/Electronic Songs (Billboard)	4
US Pop Airplay (Billboard)	20
Venezuela Anglo Airplay (Monitor Latino)	12

=== Monthly charts ===
Monthly chart performance
Chart (2026)	Peak position
CIS Airplay (TopHit)	54
Estonia Airplay (TopHit)	18
Latvia Airplay (TopHit)	1
Lithuania Airplay (TopHit)	3
Romania Airplay (TopHit)	28

== Release history ==
Region	Date	Format	Version	Label	Ref.
Various	15 May 2026	Digital download; streaming	Original	Stmpd	
Italy	29 May 2026	Radio airplay	Original	Stmpd	
United States	2 June 2026	Contemporary hit radio	Original	Stmpd	
Various	19 June 2026	Digital download; streaming	Acoustic version	Stmpd	
Various	26 June 2026	Digital download; streaming	2015 version	Stmpd	
