= Camera (Ed Sheeran song) =

- Unplugged version cover art

Single by Ed Sheeran

from the album Play
- B-side: "Spiral"
- Released: 12 September 2025
- Length: 3:35
- Label: Gingerbread Man; Atlantic
- Songwriters: Ed Sheeran; Andrew Watt; Louis Bell; David Hodges
- Producers: Sheeran; Ilya; Watt; Bell

Ed Sheeran singles chronology
"A Little More" (2025)	"Camera" (2025)	"Repeat It" (2026)

Music video
- "Camera" on YouTube

"Camera" is a song by English singer-songwriter Ed Sheeran. It was released on 12 September 2025 by Gingerbread Man and Atlantic Records, as the fifth and final single from his eighth studio album, Play. "Camera" was written by Sheeran, Andrew Watt, Louis Bell and David Hodges, and produced by Sheeran, Ilya, Watt and Bell. It reached numbers four in Belgium Flanders, 16 in the United Kingdom, 31 in Switzerland, 33 in New Zealand, and 36 in Canada. The music video, shot mainly in Croatia, features English actress Phoebe Dynevor. An unplugged version was released on 3 October, and a remix by Cyril followed on 31 October 2025. "Camera" was nominated for the iHeartRadio Music Award in category Best Lyrics.

== Music video ==
Originally, Sheeran wanted to use private home footage of his and his wife for the "Camera" music video. However, valuing their privacy, he recreated a few key moments of their relationship for the music video with English actress, Phoebe Dynevor. Filming started on 19 August 2025 on the Croatian island, Hvar and wrapped in Split, Croatia. It was shot on iPhone and directed by Emil Nava. Part of the video was recorded during Sheeran's +−=÷× Tour in Sweden on 22 August 2025, when Dynevor joined him on stage. The "Camera" music video was released alongside the album on 12 September 2025.

== Track listing ==
- Digital and streaming single
1. "Camera" – 3:35
- Digital and streaming single
1. "Camera" (unplugged) – 3:33
- Digital and streaming single
1. "Camera" (Cyril remix) – 2:43
- 7-inch single
1. "Camera" – 3:35
2. "Spiral" – 3:14

== Charts ==
=== Weekly charts ===
Chart (2025–2026)	Peak position
Argentina Anglo Airplay (Monitor Latino)	9
Australia (ARIA)	97
Austria (Ö3 Austria Top 40)	55
Belgium (Ultratop 50 Flanders)	4
Canada Hot 100 (Billboard)	36
Canada AC (Billboard)	3
Canada CHR/Top 40 (Billboard)	16
Canada Hot AC (Billboard)	5
Colombia Anglo Airplay (Monitor Latino)	14
Croatia International Airplay (Top lista)	5
Czech Republic Airplay (ČNS IFPI)	3
Denmark Airplay (Tracklisten)	12
Dominican Republic Anglo Airplay (Monitor Latino)	12
Estonia Airplay (TopHit) Cyril remix	29
Finland Airplay (Radiosoittolista)	25
France Airplay (SNEP)	11
Germany (GfK)	54
Global 200 (Billboard)	75
Guatemala Anglo Airplay (Monitor Latino)	8
Honduras Anglo Airplay (Monitor Latino)	7
Hungary (Rádiós Top 40)	2
Ireland (IRMA)	53
Italy Airplay (EarOne)	16
Japan Hot Overseas (Billboard Japan)	7
Latin America Anglo Airplay (Monitor Latino)	19
Lebanon (Lebanese Top 20)	3
Lithuania Airplay (TopHit)	12
Lithuania Airplay (TopHit) Cyril remix	89
Malta Airplay (Radiomonitor)	2
Mexico Anglo Airplay (Monitor Latino)	16
Netherlands (Dutch Top 40)	22
Netherlands (Single Top 100)	83
New Zealand (Recorded Music NZ)	33
North Macedonia Airplay (Radiomonitor)	7
Norway (VG-lista)	70
Portugal Airplay (AFP)	13
Puerto Rico Anglo Airplay (Monitor Latino)	5
Romania Airplay (TopHit)	86
Romania Airplay (TopHit) Cyril remix	80
South Africa Airplay (TOSAC)	20
South Korea BGM (Circle)	108
Sweden (Sverigetopplistan)	42
Sweden Airplay (Radiomonitor)	4
Switzerland (Schweizer Hitparade)	31
Switzerland Airplay (IFPI)	1
UK Singles (Official Charts)	16
US Billboard Hot 100	58
US Adult Contemporary (Billboard)	12
US Adult Pop Airplay (Billboard)	6
US Pop Airplay (Billboard)	11

=== Monthly charts ===
Chart (2025–2026)	Peak position
Estonia Airplay (TopHit) Cyril remix	49
Lithuania Airplay (TopHit)	34

=== Year-end charts ===
Chart (2025)	Position
Belgium (Ultratop 50 Flanders)	168
Canada AC (Billboard)	83
Canada Hot AC (Billboard)	89
Netherlands (Dutch Top 40)	88

== Certifications ==
Certifications for "Camera"
Region	Certification	Certified units/sales
Australia (ARIA)	Gold	35,000^{‡}
United Kingdom (BPI)	Silver	200,000^{‡}
^{‡} Sales+streaming figures based on certification alone.

== Release history ==
Region	Date	Format	Version	Label	Ref.
Various	12 September 2025	Digital download; streaming	Original	Gingerbread Man; Atlantic	
Italy	12 September 2025	Radio airplay	Original	Gingerbread Man; Atlantic	
United States	16 September 2025	Contemporary hit radio	Original	Gingerbread Man; Atlantic	
Various	3 October 2025	Digital download; streaming	Unplugged	Gingerbread Man; Atlantic	
Various	31 October 2025	Digital download; streaming	Cyril remix	Gingerbread Man; Atlantic	
Various	28 November 2025	7-inch	Original	Gingerbread Man; Atlantic	
