= Azizam (song) =

Single by Ed Sheeran

from the album Play
- B-side: "Crashing"
- Released: 4 April 2025
- Genre: Electropop
- Length: 2:42
- Label: Gingerbread Man; Atlantic
- Songwriters: Ed Sheeran; Ilya Salmanzadeh; Johnny McDaid; Savan Kotecha
- Producers: Ed Sheeran; Ilya; Johnny McDaid; Savan Kotecha

Ed Sheeran singles chronology
"Under the Tree" (2024)	"Azizam" (2025)	"Old Phone" (2025)

Music video
- "Azizam" on YouTube

"Azizam" (Persian: عزیزم, romanized: 'azizam, lit. 'my beloved') is a song by English singer-songwriter Ed Sheeran. It was released on 4 April 2025 under Sheeran's own label Gingerbread Man Records and Atlantic Records, and distributed by Warner Records as the lead single from his eighth studio album, Play. The track was written and produced by Sheeran, Ilya Salmanzadeh, Johnny McDaid, and Savan Kotecha. A Persian version of the song featuring Iranian singer Googoosh was released on 18 April 2025. After a bet with Polish influencer Łatwogang, a Polish version featuring Łatwogang was released on 9 October 2025. The CD and 7-inch singles were issued on 2 May 2025, including exclusive bonus track "Crashing". "Azizam" debuted at number three on the UK Singles Chart, becoming Sheeran's 42nd top 10 hit in his home country. It also topped the charts in Belgium and the Netherlands, and reached top 10 in Germany, Switzerland, Sweden and Denmark. "Azizam" won International Hit of the Year Award at the 2025 NRJ Music Awards. It was also nominated for Song of the Year at the 2026 Brit Awards.

== Composition ==
The word "azizam" (عزیزم) originates from the Persian language and literally translates to "my dear" or "my beloved". The track features a vibrant dance beat with Persian music influences. Several Iranian and Indian artists took part in the recording of the song, playing instruments like ghatam, daf, santoor, hammered dulcimer, or lute, and singing backing vocals. "Azizam" was inspired by Sheeran's wife and their love affair. Sheeran explained the meaning of the song and its composition process on his social media pages:

"Even though it's completely different to anything that I've ever done before, 'Azizam' feels familiar to me. I wanted to create a party atmosphere in a song and Ilya Salmanzadeh, who I worked with on the track, helped bring that to life. He was so inspiring to work with. I wrote 'Azizam' after [Salmanzadeh] suggested trying out making music inspired by his Persian heritage and culture. I love learning about music and different cultures the more I travel and connect with people. It was like opening a door to a completely new and exciting world. I loved how a lot of rhythms, scales, melodies and instruments were different but similar to the Irish trad music I had grown up with. It was showing to me music connects us all, and really is a universal language".

== Promotion ==
On 15 March 2025, he debuted "Azizam" during a surprise street performance in New Orleans. Four days later, a 30-second snippet of "Azizam" premiered on YouTube.

== Critical reception ==
Reviewing "Azizam" for The Guardian, Alexis Petridis wrote that the song at first instance appears to be a non-commercial tune but "once you hear the end result, it has pretty much the same relation to Persian music as 'Galway Girl' did to sean-nós singing" stressing that the "Middle Eastern cast to a counter-melody that appears during the chorus, but the rest is positively Anglo-Saxon".

== Music video ==
On 4 April 2025, Sheeran released the "Pink Heart Video" of "Azizam", directed by Liam Pethick. It was filmed mainly in the United States, during the promotion of the single in March 2025.

The official music video was released on 17 April 2025. It was filmed in South London in mid-February 2025, after Sheeran finished the Indian leg of his ongoing +–=÷× Tour, and directed by Iranian-American filmmaker, Saman Kesh. The Persian wedding-themed video stars Googoosh, Andy, Omid Djalili, Eyelar, Ilya Salmanzadeh and Shervin Alenabi.

== Track listing ==
- Digital and streaming single
1. "Azizam" – 2:42
- Digital and streaming single
1. "Azizam" (Persian version; featuring Googoosh) – 2:42
- CD and 7-inch single
1. "Azizam" – 2:42
2. "Crashing" – 4:11
- Digital and streaming single
1. "Azizam" (D.O.D remix) – 2:48
- Digital and streaming single
1. "Azizam" (acoustic version) – 2:41

== Credits and personnel ==
Credits adapted from Tidal.

- Ed Sheeran – songwriting, production, vocal production, lead vocals, guitar, backing vocals
- Ilya Salmanzadeh – songwriting, production, bass, drums, keyboards, backing vocals, programming, engineering
- Johnny McDaid – songwriting, production, guitar, backing vocals
- Savan Kotecha – songwriting, production, backing vocals
- Graham Archer – vocal production
- Ganesh Murali – ghatam, tambourine
- Jayesh Kathak – daf
- Tapas Ray – santoor, hammered dulcimer, lute
- Andy – backing vocals
- Arash – backing vocals
- Elvira Anderfjärd – backing vocals
- Eyelar Mirzazadeh – backing vocals
- Luka Kloser – backing vocals
- Citizens of the World Choir – choral backing vocals
- Graham Archer – engineering
- Jeremy Lertola – assistant engineer
- Nick Rose – assistant engineer
- Will Reynolds – assistant engineer
- Serban Ghenea – mixing
- Bryce Bordone – assistant mixing engineer
- Stuart Hawkes – mastering

== Charts ==
=== Weekly charts ===
Weekly chart performance for "Azizam"
Chart (2025–2026)	Peak position
Argentina Anglo Airplay (Monitor Latino)	2
Australia (ARIA)	20
Austria (Ö3 Austria Top 40)	12
Belarus Airplay (TopHit)	5
Belgium (Ultratop 50 Flanders)	1
Belgium (Ultratop 50 Wallonia)	2
Bolivia Anglo Airplay (Monitor Latino)	1
Brazil Airplay (Top 100 Brasil)	83
Bulgaria Airplay (PROPHON)	1
Canada Hot 100 (Billboard)	12
Canada AC (Billboard)	1
Canada CHR/Top 40 (Billboard)	6
Canada Hot AC (Billboard)	3
Canada Modern Rock (Billboard Canada)	37
Central America Anglo Airplay (Monitor Latino)	3
Chile Airplay (Monitor Latino)	7
CIS Airplay (TopHit)	1
Colombia Anglo Airplay (National-Report)	1
Costa Rica Anglo Airplay (Monitor Latino)	4
Croatia International Airplay (Top lista)	1
Croatia International Airplay (Top lista) Persian version featuring Googoosh	1
Czech Republic Airplay (ČNS IFPI)	7
Czech Republic Singles Digital (ČNS IFPI)	80
Denmark (Tracklisten)	9
Dominican Republic Anglo Airplay (Monitor Latino)	3
Ecuador Anglo Airplay (Monitor Latino)	3
Estonia Airplay (TopHit)	1
Finland Airplay (Radiosoittolista)	1
France (SNEP)	23
Germany (GfK)	6
Germany Airplay (BVMI)	1
Global 200 (Billboard)	17
Greece International (IFPI)	36
Greece Airplay (IFPI)	1
Guatemala Anglo Airplay (Monitor Latino)	2
Hungary (Dance Top 40)	7
Hungary (Rádiós Top 40)	1
Hungary (Editors' Choice Top 40)	1
Iceland (Tónlistinn)	18
Ireland (IRMA)	13
Israel International Airplay (Media Forest)	1
Italy (FIMI)	46
Japan Hot 100 (Billboard)	48
Kazakhstan Airplay (TopHit)	6
Latin America Anglo Airplay (Monitor Latino)	2
Latvia Airplay (LaIPA)	1
Lebanon (Lebanese Top 20)	4
Lithuania (AGATA)	62
Lithuania Airplay (TopHit)	1
Luxembourg (Billboard)	6
Malta Airplay (Radiomonitor)	1
Mexico Anglo Airplay (Monitor Latino)	2
Moldova Airplay (TopHit)	103
Netherlands (Dutch Top 40)	1
Netherlands (Single Top 100)	8
New Zealand (Recorded Music NZ)	26
Nicaragua Anglo Airplay (Monitor Latino)	3
Nigeria (TurnTable Top 100)	39
North Macedonia Airplay (Radiomonitor)	1
Norway (VG-lista)	12
Norway Airplay (IFPI Norge)	1
Panama Airplay (Monitor Latino)	5
Panama International (PRODUCE)	19
Paraguay Airplay (Monitor Latino)	4
Peru Anglo Airplay (Monitor Latino)	5
Poland Airplay (OLiS)	1
Poland Streaming (OLiS)	20
Portugal (AFP)	111
Puerto Rico Anglo Airplay (Monitor Latino)	3
Romania Airplay (UPFR)	4
Romania Airplay (Media Forest)	1
Romania TV Airplay (Media Forest)	9
Russia Airplay (TopHit)	6
San Marino Airplay (SMRTV Top 50)	1
Serbia Airplay (Radiomonitor)	2
Slovakia Airplay (ČNS IFPI)	2
Slovakia Singles Digital (ČNS IFPI)	63
Slovenia Airplay (Radiomonitor)	1
South Africa Airplay (TOSAC)	2
South Korea BGM (Circle)	27
South Korea Download (Circle)	68
Spain (Promusicae)	98
Suriname (Nationale Top 40)	18
Sweden (Sverigetopplistan)	7
Switzerland (Schweizer Hitparade)	3
Turkey International Airplay (Radiomonitor Türkiye)	1
Ukraine Airplay (TopHit)	4
UK Singles (Official Charts)	3
Uruguay Airplay (Monitor Latino)	4
US Billboard Hot 100	28
US Adult Contemporary (Billboard)	10
US Adult Pop Airplay (Billboard)	4
US Dance Airplay (Billboard)	34
US Pop Airplay (Billboard)	8
Venezuela Airplay (Record Report)	22

Weekly chart performance for "Azizam" (Łatwogang version)
Chart (2025)	Peak position
Poland Airplay (OLiS)	16
Poland Streaming (OLiS)	11

=== Monthly charts ===
Monthly chart performance for "Azizam"
Chart (2025)	Peak position
Belarus Airplay (TopHit)	7
CIS Airplay (TopHit)	1
Estonia Airplay (TopHit)	3
Kazakhstan Airplay (TopHit)	8
Latvia Airplay (TopHit)	4
Lithuania Airplay (TopHit)	2
Paraguay Airplay (SGP)	60
Romania Airplay (TopHit)	6
Russia Airplay (TopHit)	7
Ukraine Airplay (TopHit)	5

=== Year-end charts ===
Year-end chart performance for "Azizam"
Chart (2025)	Position
Argentina Airplay (Monitor Latino)	34
Australia (ARIA)	85
Austria (Ö3 Austria Top 40)	31
Belarus Airplay (TopHit)	16
Belgium (Ultratop 50 Flanders)	6
Belgium (Ultratop 50 Wallonia)	15
Bolivia Airplay (Monitor Latino)	77
Bulgaria Airplay (PROPHON)	2
Canada (Canadian Hot 100)	31
Canada AC (Billboard)	6
Canada CHR/Top 40 (Billboard)	24
Canada Hot AC (Billboard)	16
Central America Anglo Airplay (Monitor Latino)	10
Chile Airplay (Monitor Latino)	13
Colombia Anglo Airplay (Monitor Latino)	21
CIS Airplay (TopHit)	5
Costa Rica Anglo Airplay (Monitor Latino)	46
Dominican Republic Anglo Airplay (Monitor Latino)	24
Ecuador Anglo Airplay (Monitor Latino)	6
Estonia Airplay (TopHit)	4
France (SNEP)	64
Germany (GfK)	22
Global 200 (Billboard)	130
Guatemala Anglo Airplay (Monitor Latino)	5
Hungary (Rádiós Top 40)	20
Hungary (Dance Top 40)	29
Hungary (Editors' Choice Top 40)	6
Iceland (Tónlistinn)	54
Kazakhstan Airplay (TopHit)	30
Latvia Airplay (TopHit)	20
Lithuania Airplay (TopHit)	4
Mexico Airplay (Monitor Latino)	64
Netherlands (Dutch Top 40)	4
Netherlands (Single Top 100)	26
Nicaragua Anglo Airplay (Monitor Latino)	50
Panama Airplay (Monitor Latino)	44
Paraguay Airplay (Monitor Latino)	34
Poland (Polish Airplay Top 100)	3
Poland (Polish Streaming Top 100)	73
Puerto Rico Anglo Airplay (Monitor Latino)	23
Romania Airplay (TopHit)	24
Russia Airplay (TopHit)	48
Sweden (Sverigetopplistan)	38
Switzerland (Schweizer Hitparade)	30
UK Singles (OCC)	39
Uruguay Airplay (Monitor Latino)	19
US Adult Contemporary (Billboard)	14
US Adult Pop Airplay (Billboard)	19
US Pop Airplay (Billboard)	34
Venezuela Anglo Airplay (Monitor Latino)	30

== Certifications ==
Certifications for "Azizam"
Region	Certification	Certified units/sales
Australia (ARIA)	2× Platinum	140,000^{‡}
Austria (IFPI Austria)	Gold	15,000^{‡}
Canada (Music Canada)	Platinum	80,000^{‡}
Denmark (IFPI Danmark)	Platinum	90,000^{‡}
France (SNEP)	Diamond	333,333^{‡}
Germany (BVMI)	Gold	300,000^{‡}
Italy (FIMI)	Gold	100,000^{‡}
New Zealand (RMNZ)	Platinum	30,000^{‡}
Poland (ZPAV)	Platinum	125,000^{‡}
Spain (Promusicae)	Gold	50,000^{‡}
United Kingdom (BPI)	Platinum	600,000^{‡}
United States (RIAA)	Gold	500,000^{‡}
^{‡} Sales+streaming figures based on certification alone.

== Release history ==
Release history for "Azizam"
Region	Date	Format	Version	Label	Ref.
Various	4 April 2025	Digital download; streaming	Original	Gingerbread Man; Warner	
Italy	4 April 2025	Radio airplay	Original	Gingerbread Man; Warner	
United States	7 April 2025	Hot adult contemporary radio	Original	Gingerbread Man; Warner	
United States	8 April 2025	Contemporary hit radio	Original	Gingerbread Man; Warner	
Various	18 April 2025	Digital download; streaming	Persian	Gingerbread Man; Warner	
Various	2 May 2025	CD; 7-inch	Original	Gingerbread Man; Warner	
Various	16 May 2025	Digital download; streaming	D.O.D remix	Gingerbread Man; Warner	
Various	23 May 2025	Digital download; streaming	Acoustic	Gingerbread Man; Warner	
