= List of Billboard Hot 100 number-one singles of the 2020s =

The Billboard Hot 100 is a chart that ranks the best-performing songs of the United States. Published by Billboard magazine, the data are compiled by Nielsen SoundScan based collectively on each single's weekly physical and digital sales, airplay, and, since 2012, streaming.

A new chart is compiled and officially released to the public every Tuesday in Billboard magazine and on its website. Each chart is dated with the "week-ending" date of the Saturday four days later.

Mariah Carey's "All I Want for Christmas Is You" began the 2020s in the number-one position on the Hot 100, and made her the first artist to rank at number one on charts from four different decades. The song was in its third week at number one on January 4, 2020, reaching the top for the first time on December 21, 2019. The following week, on January 11, 2020, Post Malone's "Circles" returned to the number-one spot, another carry-over from the 2010s; it originally reached number one on November 30, 2019.

== Number-one singles ==
Key

* – The current number one
♪ – Number-one single of the year

Note: The best-performing single on the Billboard Hot 100 of 2021 was Dua Lipa's "Levitating", which peaked at number two, and thus is excluded here.

#	Reached number one	Artist(s)	Single	Weeks at number one	References
2020
1096	January 18, 2020	Roddy Ricch	"The Box"	11	
1097	April 4, 2020	The Weeknd	"Blinding Lights" ♪	4	
1098	April 18, 2020	Drake	"Toosie Slide"	1	
1099	May 9, 2020	The Scotts (Travis Scott and Kid Cudi)	"The Scotts"	1	
1100	May 16, 2020	Doja Cat featuring Nicki Minaj	"Say So"	1	
1101	May 23, 2020	Ariana Grande and Justin Bieber	"Stuck with U"	1	
1102	May 30, 2020	Megan Thee Stallion featuring Beyoncé	"Savage"	1	
1103	June 6, 2020	Lady Gaga and Ariana Grande	"Rain on Me"	1	
1104	June 13, 2020	DaBaby featuring Roddy Ricch	"Rockstar"	7	
1105	June 27, 2020	6ix9ine and Nicki Minaj	"Trollz"	1	
1106	August 8, 2020	Taylor Swift	"Cardigan"	1	
1107	August 15, 2020	Harry Styles	"Watermelon Sugar"	1	
1108	August 22, 2020	Cardi B featuring Megan Thee Stallion	"WAP"	4	
1109	September 5, 2020	BTS	"Dynamite"	3	
1110	October 10, 2020	Travis Scott featuring Young Thug and M.I.A.	"Franchise"	1	
1111	October 17, 2020	Jawsh 685, Jason Derulo and BTS	"Savage Love (Laxed – Siren Beat)"	1	
1112	October 24, 2020	24kGoldn featuring Iann Dior	"Mood"	8	
1113	November 7, 2020	Ariana Grande	"Positions"	1	
1114	December 5, 2020	BTS	"Life Goes On"	1	
re	December 19, 2020	Mariah Carey	"All I Want for Christmas Is You"	2^{A}	
1115	December 26, 2020	Taylor Swift	"Willow"	1	
2021
1116	January 23, 2021	Olivia Rodrigo	"Drivers License"	8	
1117	March 20, 2021	Drake	"What's Next"	1	
1118	March 27, 2021	Cardi B	"Up"	1	
1119	April 3, 2021	Justin Bieber featuring Daniel Caesar and Giveon	"Peaches"	1	
1120	April 10, 2021	Lil Nas X	"Montero (Call Me by Your Name)"	1	
1121	April 17, 2021	Silk Sonic (Bruno Mars and Anderson .Paak)	"Leave the Door Open"	2	
1122	April 24, 2021	Polo G	"Rapstar"	2	
1123	May 8, 2021	The Weeknd and Ariana Grande	"Save Your Tears"	2	
1124	May 29, 2021	Olivia Rodrigo	"Good 4 U"	1	
1125	June 5, 2021	BTS	"Butter"	10	
1126	July 24, 2021	BTS	"Permission to Dance"	1	
1127	August 14, 2021	The Kid Laroi and Justin Bieber	"Stay"	7	
1128	September 18, 2021	Drake featuring Future and Young Thug	"Way 2 Sexy"	1	
1129	October 9, 2021	Coldplay and BTS	"My Universe"	1	
1130	October 23, 2021	Lil Nas X and Jack Harlow	"Industry Baby"	1	
1131	October 30, 2021	Adele	"Easy on Me"	10	
1132	November 27, 2021	Taylor Swift	"All Too Well (Taylor's Version)"	1	
re	December 25, 2021	Mariah Carey	"All I Want for Christmas Is You"	3^{A}	
2022
1133	February 5, 2022	Carolina Gaitán, Mauro Castillo, Adassa, Rhenzy Feliz, Diane Guerrero, Stephanie Beatriz and the Encanto cast	"We Don't Talk About Bruno"	5	
1134	March 12, 2022	Glass Animals	"Heat Waves" ♪	5	
1135	April 16, 2022	Harry Styles	"As It Was"	15	
1136	April 23, 2022	Jack Harlow	"First Class"	3	
1137	May 14, 2022	Future featuring Drake and Tems	"Wait for U"	1	
1138	July 2, 2022	Drake featuring 21 Savage	"Jimmy Cooks"	1	
1139	July 30, 2022	Lizzo	"About Damn Time"	2	
1140	August 13, 2022	Beyoncé	"Break My Soul"	2	
1141	August 27, 2022	Nicki Minaj	"Super Freaky Girl"	1	
1142	October 8, 2022	Steve Lacy	"Bad Habit"	3	
1143	October 29, 2022	Sam Smith and Kim Petras	"Unholy"	1	
1144	November 5, 2022	Taylor Swift	"Anti-Hero"	8	
re	December 17, 2022	Mariah Carey	"All I Want for Christmas Is You"	4^{A}	
2023
1145	January 28, 2023	Miley Cyrus	"Flowers"	8	
1146	March 11, 2023	The Weeknd and Ariana Grande	"Die for You"	1	
1147	March 18, 2023	Morgan Wallen	"Last Night" ♪	16	
1148	April 8, 2023	Jimin	"Like Crazy"	1	
1149	April 29, 2023	SZA	"Kill Bill"	1	
1150	July 15, 2023	Olivia Rodrigo	"Vampire"	2	
1151	July 29, 2023	Jung Kook featuring Latto	"Seven"	1	
1152	August 5, 2023	Jason Aldean	"Try That in a Small Town"	1	
1153	August 26, 2023	Oliver Anthony Music	"Rich Men North of Richmond"	2	
1154	September 9, 2023	Zach Bryan featuring Kacey Musgraves	"I Remember Everything"	1	
1155	September 16, 2023	Doja Cat	"Paint the Town Red"	3	
1156	September 30, 2023	Drake featuring SZA	"Slime You Out"	1	
1157	October 21, 2023	Drake featuring J. Cole	"First Person Shooter"	1	
1158	October 28, 2023	Taylor Swift	"Cruel Summer"	4	
1159	November 11, 2023	Taylor Swift	"Is It Over Now?"	1	
1160	December 2, 2023	Jack Harlow	"Lovin on Me"	6	
1161	December 9, 2023	Brenda Lee	"Rockin' Around the Christmas Tree"	3	
re	December 23, 2023	Mariah Carey	"All I Want for Christmas Is You"	2^{A}	
2024
1162	January 27, 2024	Ariana Grande	"Yes, And?"	1	
1163	February 10, 2024	Megan Thee Stallion	"Hiss"	1	
1164	March 2, 2024	Beyoncé	"Texas Hold 'Em"	2	
1165	March 16, 2024	¥$: Ye and Ty Dolla Sign featuring Rich the Kid and Playboi Carti	"Carnival"	1	
1166	March 23, 2024	Ariana Grande	"We Can't Be Friends (Wait for Your Love)"	1	
1167	March 30, 2024	Teddy Swims	"Lose Control" ♪	1	
1168	April 6, 2024	Future, Metro Boomin and Kendrick Lamar	"Like That"	3	
1169	April 27, 2024	Hozier	"Too Sweet"	1	
1170	May 4, 2024	Taylor Swift featuring Post Malone	"Fortnight"	2	
1171	May 18, 2024	Kendrick Lamar	"Not Like Us"	3	
1172	May 25, 2024	Post Malone featuring Morgan Wallen	"I Had Some Help"	6	
1173	June 29, 2024	Sabrina Carpenter	"Please Please Please"	1	
1174	July 13, 2024	Shaboozey	"A Bar Song (Tipsy)"	19	
1175	November 2, 2024	Morgan Wallen	"Love Somebody"	1	
1176	December 7, 2024	Kendrick Lamar	"Squabble Up"	1	
re	December 14, 2024	Mariah Carey	"All I Want for Christmas Is You"	4^{A}	
2025
1177	January 11, 2025	Lady Gaga and Bruno Mars	"Die with a Smile" ♪	5	
1178	February 8, 2025	Travis Scott	"4x4"	1	
1179	March 1, 2025	Kendrick Lamar and SZA	"Luther"	13	
1180	May 31, 2025	Morgan Wallen featuring Tate McRae	"What I Want"	1	
1181	June 7, 2025	Alex Warren	"Ordinary"	10	
1182	June 21, 2025	Sabrina Carpenter	"Manchild"	1	
1183	August 16, 2025	Huntrix: Ejae, Audrey Nuna and Rei Ami	"Golden"	8	
1184	October 18, 2025	Taylor Swift	"The Fate of Ophelia"	10	
re	December 13, 2025	Mariah Carey	"All I Want for Christmas Is You"	4^{A}	
2026
1185	January 24, 2026	Bruno Mars	"I Just Might"	3	
1186	February 7, 2026	Harry Styles	"Aperture"	1	
1187	February 14, 2026	Ella Langley	"Choosin' Texas"	28*	
1188	February 21, 2026	Bad Bunny	"DTMF"	1	
1189	February 28, 2026	Taylor Swift	"Opalite"	1	
1190	April 4, 2026	BTS	"Swim"	1	
1191	May 2, 2026	Olivia Rodrigo	"Drop Dead"	1	
1192	May 30, 2026	Drake	"Janice STFU"	2	
1193	June 13, 2026	Ariana Grande	"Hate That I Made You Love Me"	1	
1194	June 20, 2026	Taylor Swift	"I Knew It, I Knew You"	2	
1195	October 10, 2026	Taylor Swift	"Patient Zero"	3	

Note

^{A} Across seven separate holiday season runs (2019–2025), "All I Want for Christmas Is You" has accumulated 22 total weeks at number one. It is the first song in the history of the Hot 100 to reach number one in at least three separate chart runs.

== Statistics ==
=== Artists by total number-one singles ===
The following artists achieved three or more number-one singles during the 2020s. A number of artists had number-one singles on their own as well as part of a collaboration. An asterisk (*) denotes that an artist is currently at number one.

Artist	Number-one singles	Singles
Taylor Swift	11	"Cardigan" "Willow" "All Too Well (Taylor's Version)" "Anti-Hero" "Cruel Summer" "Is It Over Now?" "Fortnight" "The Fate of Ophelia" "Opalite" "I Knew It, I Knew You" "Patient Zero"
Drake	8	"Toosie Slide" "What's Next" "Way 2 Sexy" "Wait for U" "Jimmy Cooks" "Slime You Out" "First Person Shooter" "Janice STFU"
Ariana Grande	8	"Stuck with U" "Rain on Me" "Positions" "Save Your Tears" "Die for You" "Yes, And?" "We Can't Be Friends (Wait for Your Love)" "Hate That I Made You Love Me"
BTS	7	"Dynamite" "Savage Love (Laxed – Siren Beat)" "Life Goes On" "Butter" "Permission to Dance" "My Universe" "Swim"
Kendrick Lamar	4	"Like That" "Not Like Us" "Squabble Up" "Luther"
Morgan Wallen	4	"Last Night" "I Had Some Help" "Love Somebody" "What I Want"
Olivia Rodrigo	4	"Drivers License" "Good 4 U" "Vampire" "Drop Dead"
Justin Bieber	3	"Stuck with U" "Peaches" "Stay"
Nicki Minaj	3	"Say So" "Trollz" "Super Freaky Girl"
The Weeknd	3	"Blinding Lights" "Save Your Tears" "Die for You"
Jack Harlow	3	"Industry Baby" "First Class" "Lovin on Me"
Megan Thee Stallion	3	"Savage" "WAP" "Hiss"
Beyoncé	3	"Savage" "Break My Soul" "Texas Hold 'Em"
Future	3	"Way 2 Sexy" "Wait for U" "Like That"
Travis Scott	3	"The Scotts" "Franchise" "4x4"
SZA	3	"Kill Bill" "Slime You Out" "Luther"
Bruno Mars	3	"Leave the Door Open" "Die with a Smile" "I Just Might"
Harry Styles	3	"Watermelon Sugar" "As It Was" "Aperture"

=== Artists by total cumulative weeks at number one ===
The following artists were featured at the top of the Hot 100 for the highest cumulative number of weeks during the 2020s. Some totals include in part or in whole weeks spent at number one as part of a collaboration. An asterisk (*) denotes that an artist is currently at number one.

Artist	Weeks at number one	Singles
Taylor Swift	34	"Cardigan" (1 week) "Willow" (1 week) "All Too Well (Taylor's Version)" (1 week) "Anti-Hero" (8 weeks) "Cruel Summer" (4 weeks) "Is It Over Now?" (1 week) "Fortnight" (2 weeks) "The Fate of Ophelia" (10 weeks) "Opalite" (1 week) "I Knew It, I Knew You" (2 weeks) "Patient Zero" (3 weeks)
Ella Langley*	28	"Choosin' Texas" (28 weeks)
Morgan Wallen	24	"Last Night" (16 weeks) "I Had Some Help" (6 weeks) "Love Somebody" (1 week) "What I Want" (1 week)
Kendrick Lamar	20	"Like That" (3 weeks) "Not Like Us" (3 weeks) "Squabble Up" (1 week) "Luther" (13 weeks)
Mariah Carey	20	"All I Want for Christmas Is You" (20 weeks in the 2020s)
Shaboozey	19	"A Bar Song (Tipsy)" (19 weeks)
Roddy Ricch	18	"The Box" (11 weeks) "Rockstar" (7 weeks)
BTS	18	"Dynamite" (3 weeks) "Savage Love (Laxed – Siren Beat)" (1 week) "Life Goes On" (1 week) "Butter" (10 weeks) "Permission to Dance" (1 week) "My Universe" (1 week) "Swim" (1 week)
Harry Styles	17	"Watermelon Sugar" (1 week) "As It Was" (15 weeks) "Aperture" (1 week)
SZA	15	"Kill Bill" (1 week) "Slime You Out" (1 week) "Luther" (13 weeks)

=== Songs by total number of weeks at number one ===
The following songs were featured at the top of the Hot 100 for the highest number of weeks during the 2020s. An asterisk (*) denotes that a song is currently at number one.

Song	Artist(s)	Weeks at number one	References
"Choosin' Texas" *	Ella Langley	28	
"All I Want for Christmas Is You"	Mariah Carey	20	
"A Bar Song (Tipsy)"	Shaboozey	19	
"Last Night"	Morgan Wallen	16	
"As It Was"	Harry Styles	15	
"Luther"	Kendrick Lamar and SZA	13	
"The Box"	Roddy Ricch	11	
"Butter"	BTS	10	
"Easy on Me"	Adele	10	
"Ordinary"	Alex Warren	10	
"The Fate of Ophelia"	Taylor Swift	10	

== See also ==
- Lists of Billboard number-one singles
- 2020s in music
- List of UK singles chart number ones of the 2020s
