= List of Canadian Hot 100 number-one singles of 2024 =

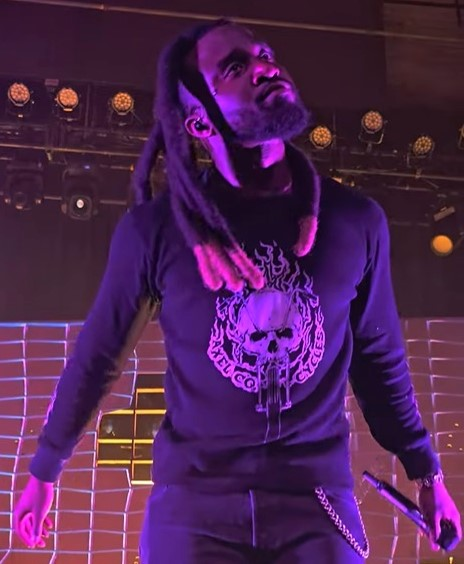
"A Bar Song (Tipsy)" by Shaboozey (pictured) is the longest-running number-one song of 2024, spending a record-breaking 25 weeks atop the Canadian Hot 100. It later ranked as the best-performing song of the year.

This is a list of the Canadian Hot 100 number-one songs of 2024. The Canadian Hot 100 is a chart that ranks the best-performing songs of Canada. Its data, published by Billboard magazine and compiled by Luminate, is based collectively on each song's weekly physical and digital sales, as well as airplay and streaming.

== Chart history ==
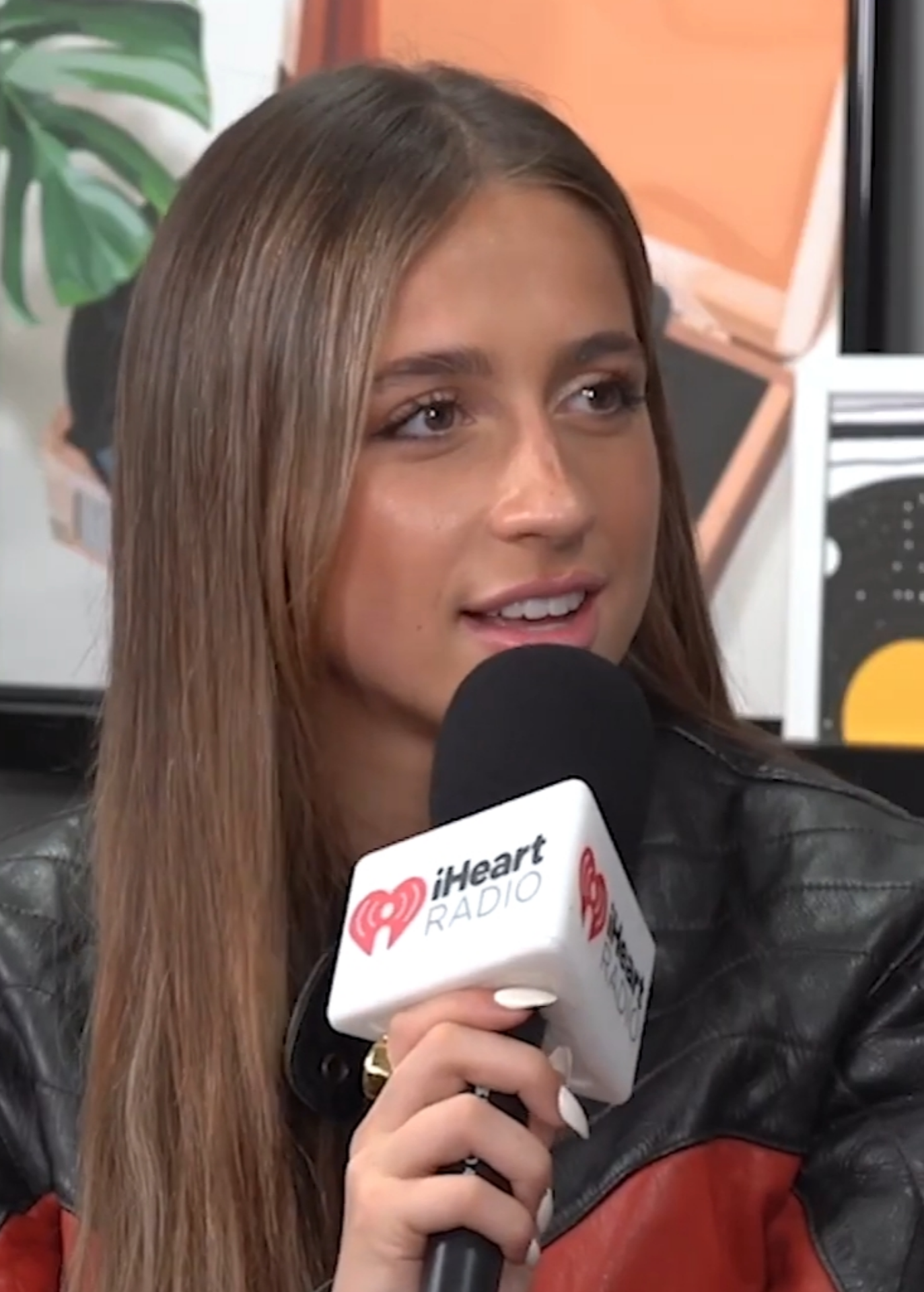
Tate McRae (pictured) spent one week atop the Canadian Hot 100 in 2024 with her single "Greedy". She was the only Canadian artist to reach number one this year.

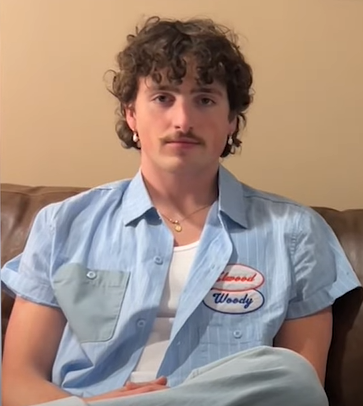
Benson Boone (pictured) earned his first number-one song with "Beautiful Things". It spent nine weeks atop the chart.

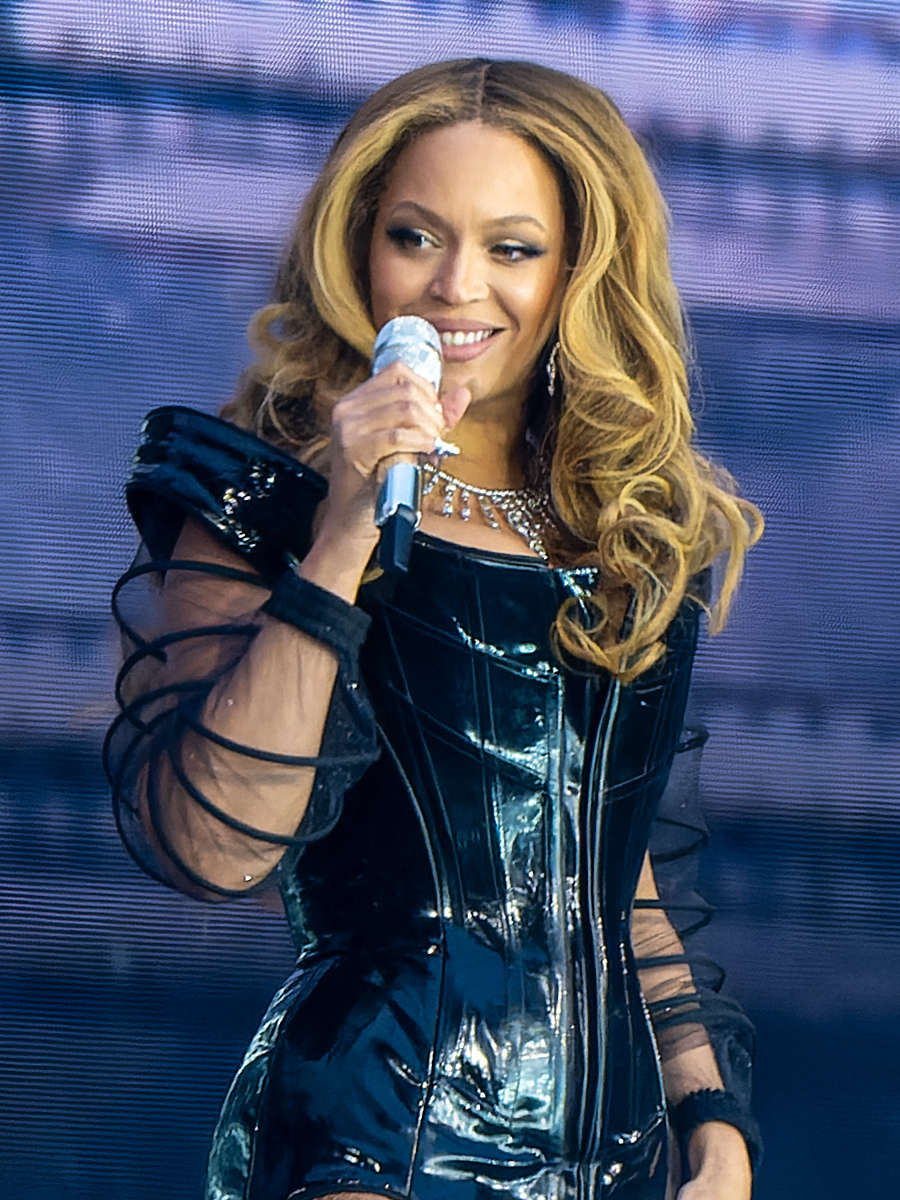
Beyoncé (pictured) earned her second number-one song on the Canadian Hot 100 with "Texas Hold 'Em", which spent two consecutive weeks at number one.

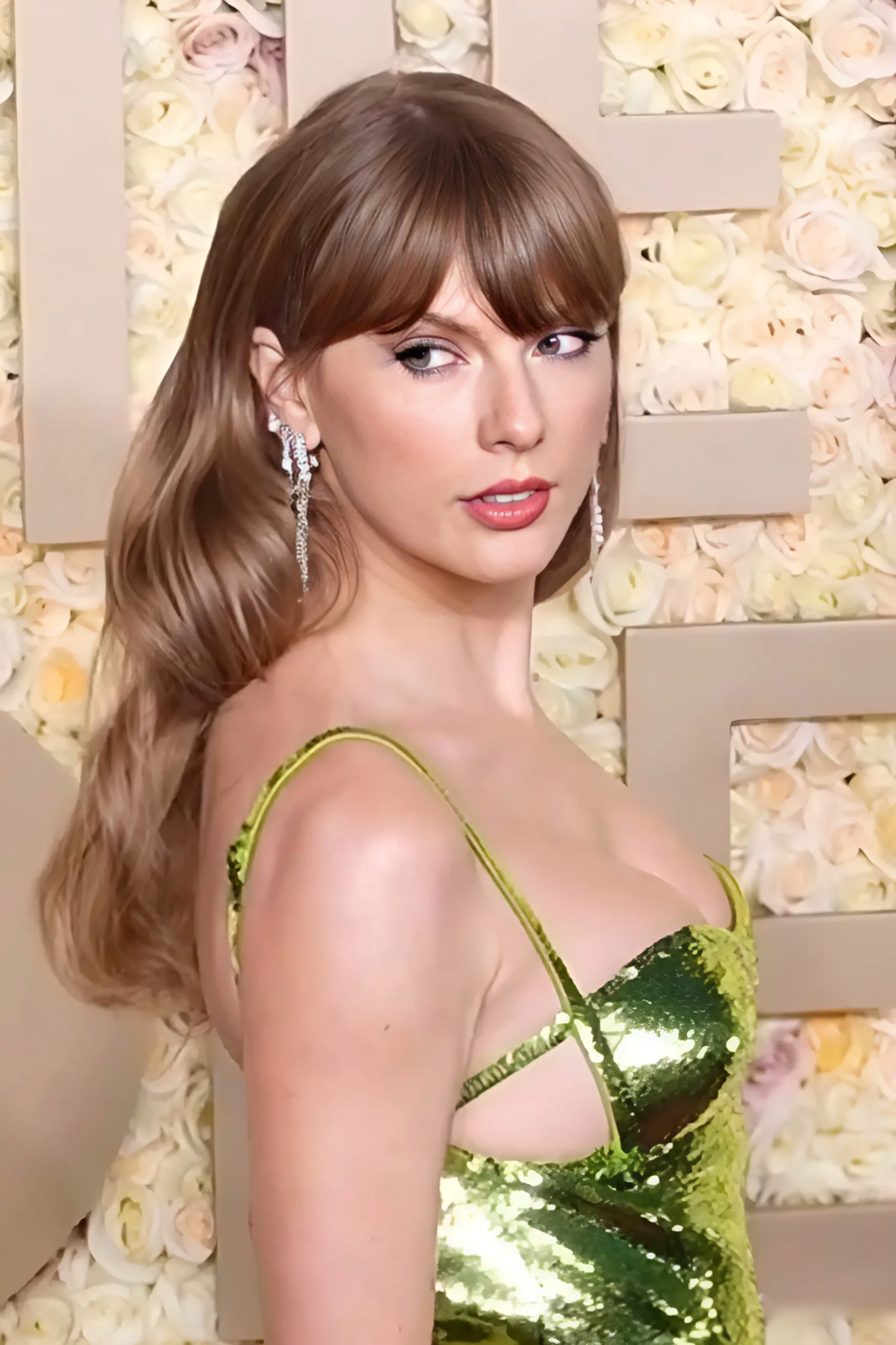
Taylor Swift (pictured) became the female artist with the most Canadian Hot 100 number-one songs, with 12, as "Fortnight" debuted atop the chart.

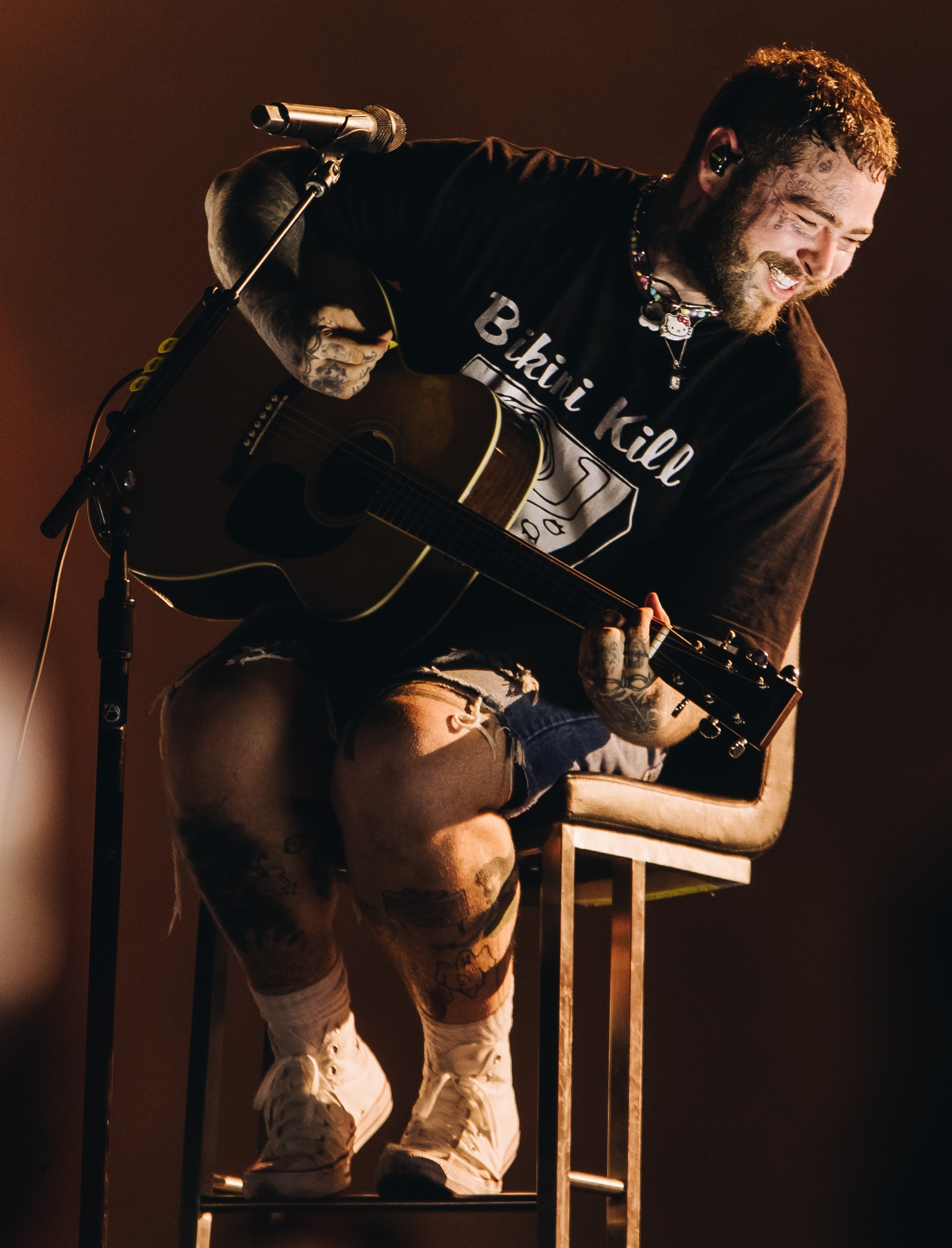
Post Malone (pictured) scored two number-one songs, the most of any artist this year, as "Fortnight" and "I Had Some Help" hit number one on the chart.

Key
†	Indicates best-performing song of 2024

List of number-one songs
No.	Issue date	Song	Artist(s)	Ref.
re	January 6	"All I Want for Christmas Is You"	Mariah Carey	
re	January 13	"Greedy"	Tate McRae	
re	January 20	"Lovin on Me"	Jack Harlow	
200	January 27	"Yes, And?"	Ariana Grande	
re	February 3	"Lovin on Me"	Jack Harlow	
201	February 10	"Beautiful Things"	Benson Boone	
201	February 17	"Beautiful Things"	Benson Boone	
201	February 24	"Beautiful Things"	Benson Boone	
202	March 2	"Texas Hold 'Em"	Beyoncé	
202	March 9	"Texas Hold 'Em"	Beyoncé	
re	March 16	"Beautiful Things"	Benson Boone	
re	March 23	"Beautiful Things"	Benson Boone	
re	March 30	"Beautiful Things"	Benson Boone	
203	April 6	"Like That"	Future, Metro Boomin and Kendrick Lamar	
re	April 13	"Beautiful Things"	Benson Boone	
re	April 20	"Beautiful Things"	Benson Boone	
re	April 27	"Beautiful Things"	Benson Boone	
204	May 4	"Fortnight"	Taylor Swift featuring Post Malone	
205	May 11	"A Bar Song (Tipsy)" †	Shaboozey	
205	May 18	"A Bar Song (Tipsy)" †	Shaboozey	
206	May 25	"I Had Some Help"	Post Malone featuring Morgan Wallen	
206	June 1	"I Had Some Help"	Post Malone featuring Morgan Wallen	
206	June 8	"I Had Some Help"	Post Malone featuring Morgan Wallen	
207	June 15	"Houdini"	Eminem	
re	June 22	"A Bar Song (Tipsy)" †	Shaboozey	
re	June 29	"A Bar Song (Tipsy)" †	Shaboozey	
re	July 6	"A Bar Song (Tipsy)" †	Shaboozey	
re	July 13	"A Bar Song (Tipsy)" †	Shaboozey	
re	July 20	"A Bar Song (Tipsy)" †	Shaboozey	
re	July 27	"A Bar Song (Tipsy)" †	Shaboozey	
re	August 3	"A Bar Song (Tipsy)" †	Shaboozey	
re	August 10	"A Bar Song (Tipsy)" †	Shaboozey	
re	August 17	"A Bar Song (Tipsy)" †	Shaboozey	
re	August 24	"A Bar Song (Tipsy)" †	Shaboozey	
re	August 31	"A Bar Song (Tipsy)" †	Shaboozey	
re	September 7	"A Bar Song (Tipsy)" †	Shaboozey	
re	September 14	"A Bar Song (Tipsy)" †	Shaboozey	
re	September 21	"A Bar Song (Tipsy)" †	Shaboozey	
re	September 28	"A Bar Song (Tipsy)" †	Shaboozey	
re	October 5	"A Bar Song (Tipsy)" †	Shaboozey	
re	October 12	"A Bar Song (Tipsy)" †	Shaboozey	
re	October 19	"A Bar Song (Tipsy)" †	Shaboozey	
re	October 26	"A Bar Song (Tipsy)" †	Shaboozey	
re	November 2	"A Bar Song (Tipsy)" †	Shaboozey	
re	November 9	"A Bar Song (Tipsy)" †	Shaboozey	
re	November 16	"A Bar Song (Tipsy)" †	Shaboozey	
re	November 23	"A Bar Song (Tipsy)" †	Shaboozey	
208	November 30	"That's So True"	Gracie Abrams	
208	December 7	"That's So True"	Gracie Abrams	
re	December 14	"All I Want for Christmas Is You"	Mariah Carey	
re	December 21	"All I Want for Christmas Is You"	Mariah Carey	
re	December 28	"All I Want for Christmas Is You"	Mariah Carey	

== See also ==
- List of number-one albums of 2024 (Canada)
