= List of Billboard Global 200 number ones of 2024 =

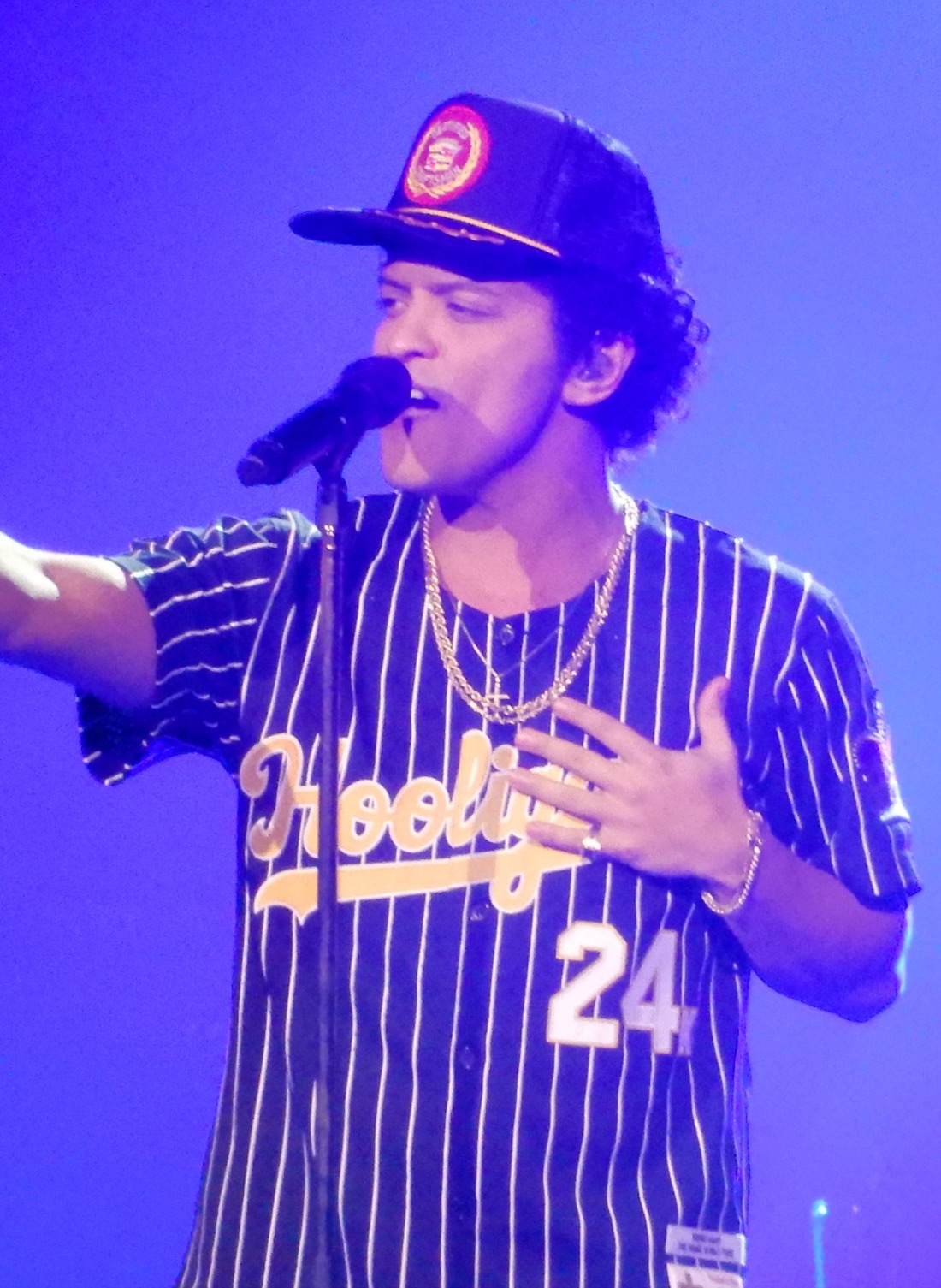
Bruno Mars spent 17 weeks atop the charts for the collaborations "Die with a Smile" with Lady Gaga and "APT." with Rosé, the latter of which was the longest reigning number-one song of the year.

The Billboard Global 200 is a chart that ranks the best-performing songs globally. Its data, published by Billboard magazine and compiled by Luminate, is based on digital sales and online streaming from over 200 territories worldwide. Another similar chart is the Billboard Global Excl. US chart, which follows the same formula except it covers all territories excluding the US. The two charts launched on September 19, 2020.

On the Global 200, twenty singles reached number one in 2024. Fifteen artists reached the top of the chart for the first time—Benson Boone, Beyoncé, Future, Metro Boomin, Kendrick Lamar, Hozier, Post Malone, Morgan Wallen, Tommy Richman, Eminem, Sabrina Carpenter, Jimin, Billie Eilish, Lady Gaga, and Bruno Mars. Mars spent the most weeks at the top spot with 17 weeks at number one for his singles "Die with a Smile" with Lady Gaga and "APT." with Rosé, the latter of which was the longest reigning number-one song with 9 weeks atop the chart.

On the Global Excl. US, fifteen singles reached number one in 2024. Ten artists reached the top of the chart for the first time—Benson Boone, Artemas, Post Malone, Sabrina Carpenter, Eminem, Lisa, Jimin, Billie Eilish, Lady Gaga, and Bruno Mars. Mars spent the most weeks at the top spot with 17 weeks at number one for his singles "Die with a Smile" with Lady Gaga and "APT." with Rosé, the latter of which was the longest reigning number-one song with 9 weeks atop the chart.

== Chart history ==
Key
| † | Indicates best-performing song of 2024 on the Global 200 |
| ‡ | Indicates best-performing song of 2024 on the Global Excl. US |

| Issue date | Billboard Global 200 | | Billboard Global Excl. US | | Ref. |
| Issue date | Song | Artist(s) | Song | Artist(s) | Ref. |
|---|---|---|---|---|---|
| January 6 | "All I Want for Christmas Is You" | Mariah Carey | "All I Want for Christmas Is You" | Mariah Carey | |
| January 13 | "Lovin on Me" | Jack Harlow | "Greedy" | Tate McRae | |
| January 20 | "Lovin on Me" | Jack Harlow | "Greedy" | Tate McRae | |
| January 27 | "Yes, And?" | Ariana Grande | "Yes, And?" | Ariana Grande | |
| February 3 | "Yes, And?" | Ariana Grande | "Yes, And?" | Ariana Grande | |
| February 10 | "Hiss" | Megan Thee Stallion | "Greedy" | Tate McRae | |
| February 17 | "Beautiful Things" † | Benson Boone | "Greedy" | Tate McRae | |
| February 24 | "Beautiful Things" † | Benson Boone | "Beautiful Things" ‡ | Benson Boone | |
| March 2 | "Texas Hold 'Em" | Beyoncé | "Beautiful Things" ‡ | Benson Boone | |
| March 9 | "Beautiful Things" † | Benson Boone | "Beautiful Things" ‡ | Benson Boone | |
| March 16 | "Beautiful Things" † | Benson Boone | "Beautiful Things" ‡ | Benson Boone | |
| March 23 | "We Can't Be Friends (Wait for Your Love)" | Ariana Grande | "We Can't Be Friends (Wait for Your Love)" | Ariana Grande | |
| March 30 | "Beautiful Things" † | Benson Boone | "Beautiful Things" ‡ | Benson Boone | |
| April 6 | "Like That" | Future, Metro Boomin and Kendrick Lamar | "Beautiful Things" ‡ | Benson Boone | |
| April 13 | "Beautiful Things" † | Benson Boone | "Beautiful Things" ‡ | Benson Boone | |
| April 20 | "Beautiful Things" † | Benson Boone | "Beautiful Things" ‡ | Benson Boone | |
| April 27 | "Too Sweet" | Hozier | "I Like the Way You Kiss Me" | Artemas | |
| May 4 | "Fortnight" | Taylor Swift featuring Post Malone | "Fortnight" | Taylor Swift featuring Post Malone | |
| May 11 | "Fortnight" | Taylor Swift featuring Post Malone | "Fortnight" | Taylor Swift featuring Post Malone | |
| May 18 | "Not Like Us" | Kendrick Lamar | "Espresso" | Sabrina Carpenter | |
| May 25 | "I Had Some Help" | Post Malone featuring Morgan Wallen | "Espresso" | Sabrina Carpenter | |
| June 1 | "Million Dollar Baby" | Tommy Richman | "Espresso" | Sabrina Carpenter | |
| June 8 | "Million Dollar Baby" | Tommy Richman | "Espresso" | Sabrina Carpenter | |
| June 15 | "Houdini" | Eminem | "Houdini" | Eminem | |
| June 22 | "Espresso" | Sabrina Carpenter | "Espresso" | Sabrina Carpenter | |
| June 29 | "Please Please Please" | Sabrina Carpenter | "Please Please Please" | Sabrina Carpenter | |
| July 6 | "Please Please Please" | Sabrina Carpenter | "Espresso" | Sabrina Carpenter | |
| July 13 | "Espresso" | Sabrina Carpenter | "Rockstar" | Lisa | |
| July 20 | "Not Like Us" | Kendrick Lamar | "Espresso" | Sabrina Carpenter | |
| July 27 | "Espresso" | Sabrina Carpenter | "Espresso" | Sabrina Carpenter | |
| August 3 | "Who" | Jimin | "Who" | Jimin | |
| August 10 | "Who" | Jimin | "Who" | Jimin | |
| August 17 | "Birds of a Feather" | Billie Eilish | "Birds of a Feather" | Billie Eilish | |
| August 24 | "Birds of a Feather" | Billie Eilish | "Birds of a Feather" | Billie Eilish | |
| August 31 | "Birds of a Feather" | Billie Eilish | "Birds of a Feather" | Billie Eilish | |
| September 7 | "Die with a Smile" | Lady Gaga and Bruno Mars | "Die with a Smile" | Lady Gaga and Bruno Mars | |
| September 14 | "Die with a Smile" | Lady Gaga and Bruno Mars | "Die with a Smile" | Lady Gaga and Bruno Mars | |
| September 21 | "Die with a Smile" | Lady Gaga and Bruno Mars | "Die with a Smile" | Lady Gaga and Bruno Mars | |
| September 28 | "Die with a Smile" | Lady Gaga and Bruno Mars | "Die with a Smile" | Lady Gaga and Bruno Mars | |
| October 5 | "Die with a Smile" | Lady Gaga and Bruno Mars | "Die with a Smile" | Lady Gaga and Bruno Mars | |
| October 12 | "Die with a Smile" | Lady Gaga and Bruno Mars | "Die with a Smile" | Lady Gaga and Bruno Mars | |
| October 19 | "Die with a Smile" | Lady Gaga and Bruno Mars | "Die with a Smile" | Lady Gaga and Bruno Mars | |
| October 26 | "Die with a Smile" | Lady Gaga and Bruno Mars | "Die with a Smile" | Lady Gaga and Bruno Mars | |
| November 2 | "APT." | Rosé and Bruno Mars | "APT." | Rosé and Bruno Mars | |
| November 9 | "APT." | Rosé and Bruno Mars | "APT." | Rosé and Bruno Mars | |
| November 16 | "APT." | Rosé and Bruno Mars | "APT." | Rosé and Bruno Mars | |
| November 23 | "APT." | Rosé and Bruno Mars | "APT." | Rosé and Bruno Mars | |
| November 30 | "APT." | Rosé and Bruno Mars | "APT." | Rosé and Bruno Mars | |
| December 7 | "APT." | Rosé and Bruno Mars | "APT." | Rosé and Bruno Mars | |
| December 14 | "APT." | Rosé and Bruno Mars | "APT." | Rosé and Bruno Mars | |
| December 21 | "APT." | Rosé and Bruno Mars | "APT." | Rosé and Bruno Mars | |
| December 28 | "APT." | Rosé and Bruno Mars | "APT." | Rosé and Bruno Mars | |

== Number-one artists ==
List of number-one artists by total weeks at number one on Global 200
| Position | Artist | Weeks at No. 1 |
|---|---|---|
| 1 | Bruno Mars | 17 |
| 2 | Rosé | 9 |
| 3 | Lady Gaga | 8 |
| 4 | Benson Boone | 7 |
| 5 | Sabrina Carpenter | 5 |
| 6 | Ariana Grande | 3 |
| 6 | Post Malone | 3 |
| 6 | Kendrick Lamar | 3 |
| 6 | Billie Eilish | 3 |
| 7 | Jack Harlow | 2 |
| 7 | Taylor Swift | 2 |
| 7 | Tommy Richman | 2 |
| 7 | Jimin | 2 |
| 8 | Mariah Carey | 1 |
| 8 | Megan Thee Stallion | 1 |
| 8 | Beyoncé | 1 |
| 8 | Future | 1 |
| 8 | Metro Boomin | 1 |
| 8 | Hozier | 1 |
| 8 | Morgan Wallen | 1 |
| 8 | Eminem | 1 |

List of number-one artists by total weeks at number one on Global Excl. US
| Position | Artist | Weeks at No. 1 |
|---|---|---|
| 1 | Bruno Mars | 17 |
| 2 | Sabrina Carpenter | 9 |
| 2 | Rosé | 9 |
| 3 | Benson Boone | 8 |
| 3 | Lady Gaga | 8 |
| 4 | Tate McRae | 4 |
| 5 | Ariana Grande | 3 |
| 5 | Billie Eilish | 3 |
| 6 | Taylor Swift | 2 |
| 6 | Post Malone | 2 |
| 6 | Jimin | 2 |
| 7 | Mariah Carey | 1 |
| 7 | Artemas | 1 |
| 7 | Eminem | 1 |
| 7 | Lisa | 1 |

== See also ==
- 2024 in music
- List of Billboard 200 number-one albums of 2024
- List of Billboard Hot 100 number ones of 2024
