= List of Billboard 200 number-one albums of 2024 =

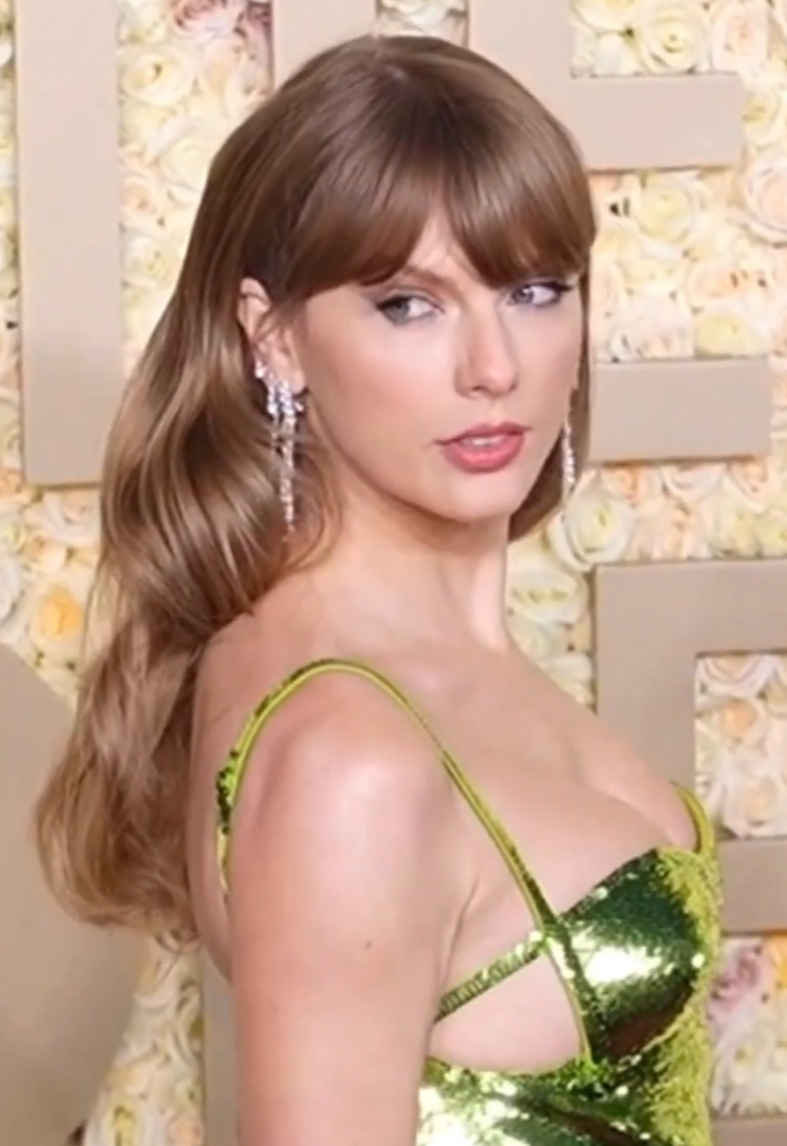
Taylor Swift topped the chart the longest in 2024, spending a cumulative 19 weeks at number one with 1989 (Taylor's Version) (2023) and The Tortured Poets Department (2024).

This is a list of the albums ranked number one in the United States during 2024. The top-performing albums and EPs in the U.S. are ranked on the Billboard 200 chart, which is published by Billboard magazine. The data is compiled by Luminate based on multi-metric consumption as measured in album-equivalent units, which comprise album sales, track sales, and streams on digital music platforms. Each unit equals one album sold, or 10 individual digital tracks sold from an album, or 3,750 ad-supported or 1,250 paid/subscription on-demand official audio and video streams generated by songs from an album.

In 2024, twenty-four albums reached number one on the Billboard 200. The Tortured Poets Department, the eleventh studio album by American singer-songwriter Taylor Swift, was the longest-running number-one album of the year with 17 cumulative weeks atop the chart. It broke several all-time Billboard 200 records, including becoming the first album by a female artist to spend its first 12 weeks at the chart's number-one spot. It also earned over 2 million album-equivalent units in its first week—the largest sum of the year and a record seventh album by Swift to earn more than a million units in a week.

Short n' Sweet, the sixth studio album by American singer Sabrina Carpenter, spent four weeks at number one. One Thing at a Time by American country singer Morgan Wallen and Chromakopia by American rapper Tyler, the Creator both spent three weeks at number one. Future and Metro Boomin's collaborative albums We Don't Trust You and We Still Don't Trust You topped the chart. Future also released the number-one mixtape Mixtape Pluto, making him the first rap artist to have three number one albums in the same year.

== Chart history ==
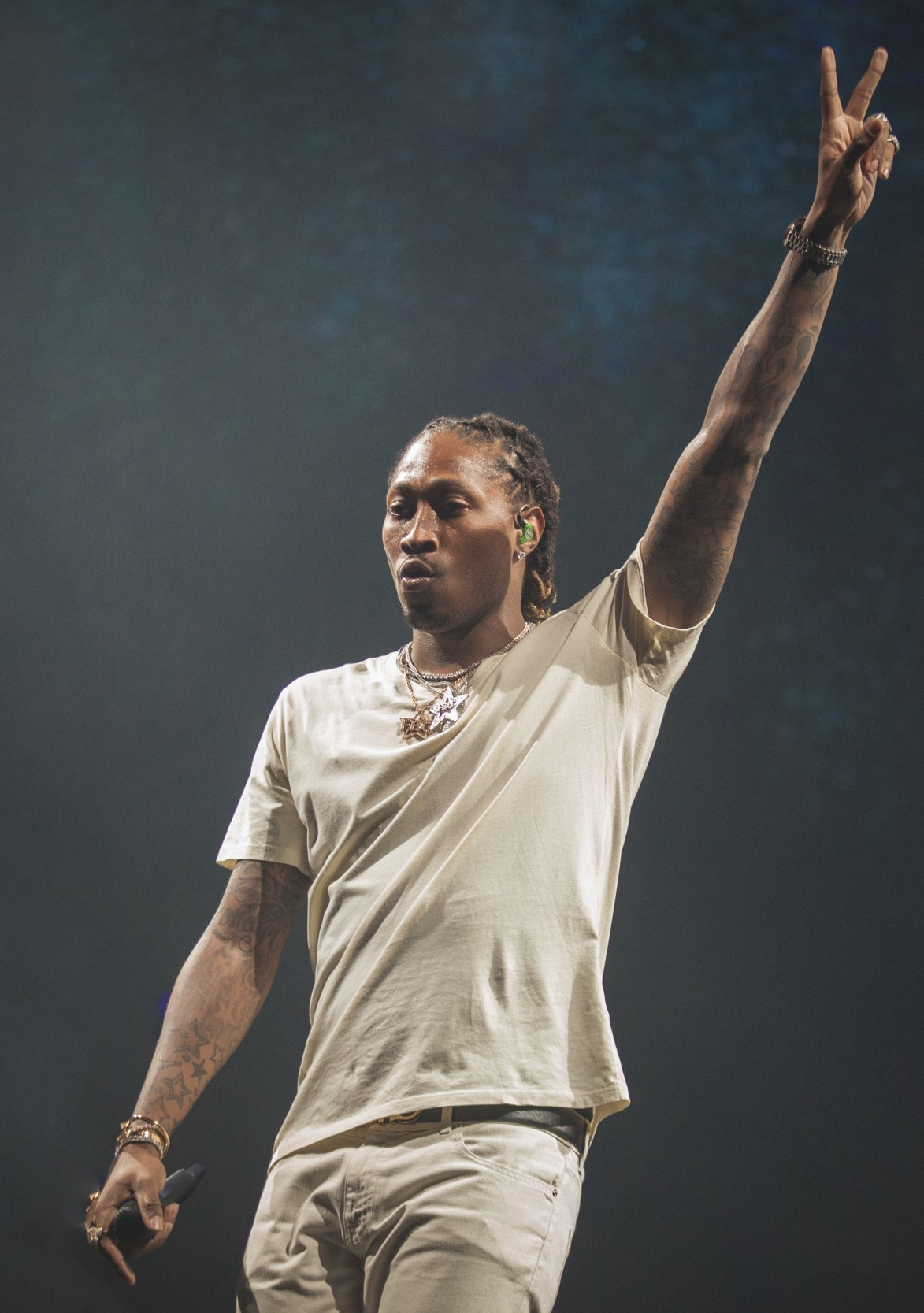
American rapper Future achieved a record three number-one albums during the year.

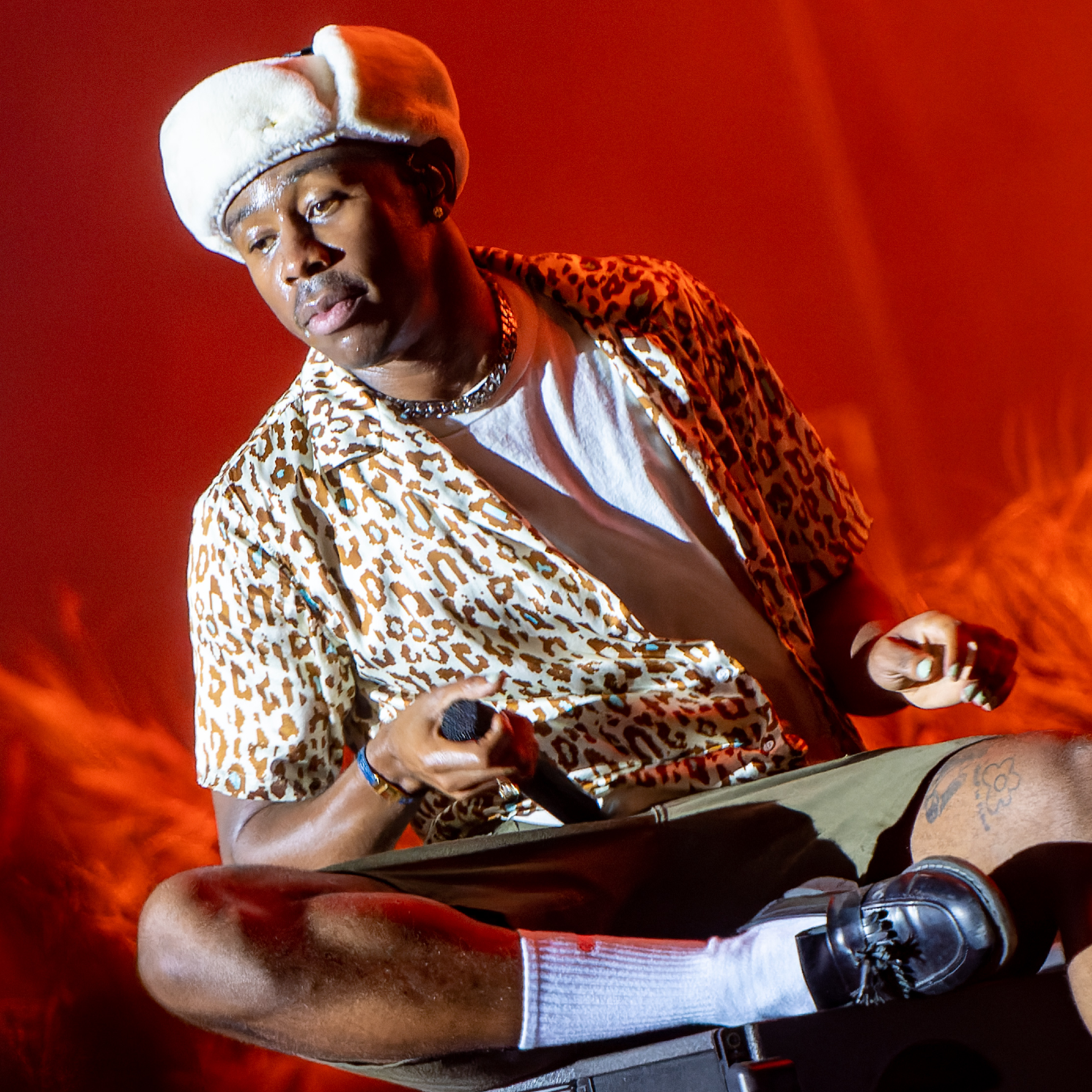
American rapper Tyler, the Creator spent three consecutive weeks atop the chart with his eighth studio album Chromakopia.

Key
| † | Indicates the best-performing album of 2024 |

| Issue date | Album | Artist(s) | Units | Ref. |
|---|---|---|---|---|
| January 6 | 1989 (Taylor's Version) | Taylor Swift | 98,000 | |
| January 13 | 1989 (Taylor's Version) | Taylor Swift | 64,000 | |
| January 20 | One Thing at a Time | Morgan Wallen | 61,000 | |
| January 27 | American Dream | 21 Savage | 133,000 | |
| February 3 | American Dream | 21 Savage | 78,000 | |
| February 10 | One Thing at a Time | Morgan Wallen | 66,000 | |
| February 17 | 35 Biggest Hits | Toby Keith | 66,000 | |
| February 24 | Vultures 1 | ¥$: Ye and Ty Dolla Sign | 148,000 | |
| March 2 | Vultures 1 | ¥$: Ye and Ty Dolla Sign | 75,000 | |
| March 9 | With You-th | Twice | 95,000 | |
| March 16 | One Thing at a Time | Morgan Wallen | 68,000 | |
| March 23 | Eternal Sunshine | Ariana Grande | 227,000 | |
| March 30 | Eternal Sunshine | Ariana Grande | 100,500 | |
| April 6 | We Don't Trust You | Future and Metro Boomin | 251,000 | |
| April 13 | Cowboy Carter | Beyoncé | 407,000 | |
| April 20 | Cowboy Carter | Beyoncé | 128,000 | |
| April 27 | We Still Don't Trust You | Future and Metro Boomin | 127,500 | |
| May 4 | The Tortured Poets Department † | Taylor Swift | 2,610,000 | |
| May 11 | The Tortured Poets Department † | Taylor Swift | 439,000 | |
| May 18 | The Tortured Poets Department † | Taylor Swift | 282,000 | |
| May 25 | The Tortured Poets Department † | Taylor Swift | 260,000 | |
| June 1 | The Tortured Poets Department † | Taylor Swift | 378,000 | |
| June 8 | The Tortured Poets Department † | Taylor Swift | 175,000 | |
| June 15 | The Tortured Poets Department † | Taylor Swift | 148,000 | |
| June 22 | The Tortured Poets Department † | Taylor Swift | 127,000 | |
| June 29 | The Tortured Poets Department † | Taylor Swift | 126,000 | |
| July 6 | The Tortured Poets Department † | Taylor Swift | 115,000 | |
| July 13 | The Tortured Poets Department † | Taylor Swift | 114,000 | |
| July 20 | The Tortured Poets Department † | Taylor Swift | 163,000 | |
| July 27 | The Death of Slim Shady (Coup de Grâce) | Eminem | 281,000 | |
| August 3 | Ate | Stray Kids | 231,000 | |
| August 10 | The Tortured Poets Department † | Taylor Swift | 71,000 | |
| August 17 | The Tortured Poets Department † | Taylor Swift | 142,000 | |
| August 24 | The Tortured Poets Department † | Taylor Swift | 85,000 | |
| August 31 | F-1 Trillion | Post Malone | 250,000 | |
| September 7 | Short n' Sweet | Sabrina Carpenter | 362,000 | |
| September 14 | Short n' Sweet | Sabrina Carpenter | 159,000 | |
| September 21 | Short n' Sweet | Sabrina Carpenter | 117,000 | |
| September 28 | Days Before Rodeo | Travis Scott | 156,000 | |
| October 5 | Mixtape Pluto | Future | 129,000 | |
| October 12 | Short n' Sweet | Sabrina Carpenter | 100,000 | |
| October 19 | Moon Music | Coldplay | 120,000 | |
| October 26 | Beautifully Broken | Jelly Roll | 161,000 | |
| November 2 | Lyfestyle | Yeat | 89,000 | |
| November 9 | Chromakopia | Tyler, the Creator | 299,500 | |
| November 16 | Chromakopia | Tyler, the Creator | 160,000 | |
| November 23 | Chromakopia | Tyler, the Creator | 104,000 | |
| November 30 | Golden Hour: Part.2 | Ateez | 184,000 | |
| December 7 | GNX | Kendrick Lamar | 319,000 | |
| December 14 | The Tortured Poets Department † | Taylor Swift | 405,000 | |
| December 21 | The Tortured Poets Department † | Taylor Swift | 240,000 | |
| December 28 | Hop | Stray Kids | 187,000 | |

== Number-one artists ==
List of number-one artists by total weeks at number one
| Rank | Artist | Weeks at No. 1 |
|---|---|---|
| 1 | Taylor Swift | 19 |
| 2 | Sabrina Carpenter | 4 |
| 3 | Morgan Wallen | 3 |
| 3 | Future | 3 |
| 3 | Tyler, the Creator | 3 |
| 6 | 21 Savage | 2 |
| 6 | ¥$ | 2 |
| 6 | Ye | 2 |
| 6 | Ty Dolla Sign | 2 |
| 6 | Ariana Grande | 2 |
| 6 | Beyoncé | 2 |
| 6 | Metro Boomin | 2 |
| 6 | Stray Kids | 2 |
| 14 | Toby Keith | 1 |
| 14 | Twice | 1 |
| 14 | Eminem | 1 |
| 14 | Post Malone | 1 |
| 14 | Travis Scott | 1 |
| 14 | Coldplay | 1 |
| 14 | Jelly Roll | 1 |
| 14 | Yeat | 1 |
| 14 | Ateez | 1 |
| 14 | Kendrick Lamar | 1 |

== See also ==
- List of Billboard Hot 100 number ones of 2024
- List of Billboard Global 200 number ones of 2024
- List of Billboard 200 number-one albums of the 2020s
- 2024 in American music
