= List of Billboard Hot 100 number ones of 2024 =

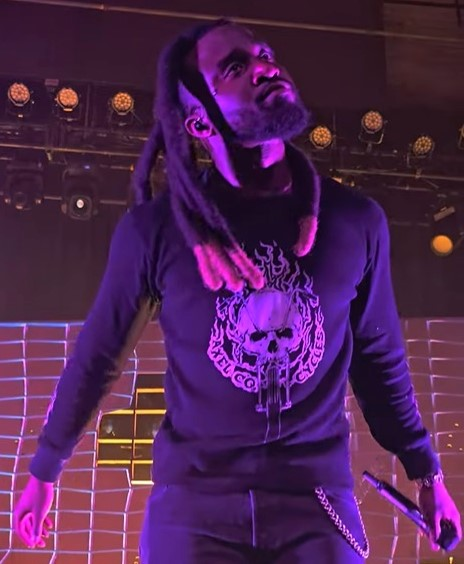
"A Bar Song (Tipsy)" by Shaboozey spent nineteen weeks atop the chart, tying Lil Nas X's "Old Town Road" as the longest-running number-one song in the chart's history at the time.

The Billboard Hot 100 is a chart that ranks the best-performing songs in the United States. Its data is compiled by Luminate Data and published by American music magazine Billboard. The chart is based on each song's weekly physical and digital sales collectively, the amount of airplay impressions it receives on American radio stations, and its audio and video streams on online digital music platforms.

"A Bar Song (Tipsy)" by Shaboozey is the longest-running number-one song of the year with nineteen weeks atop the chart. "I Had Some Help" by Post Malone featuring Morgan Wallen achieved the highest weekly sales and streams for a song in 2024. "Lose Control" by Teddy Swims topped the Billboard Hot 100 Year-End chart as the best-performing single of the year overall. Twenty-one artists charted at number one in 2024, with eight―¥$, Rich the Kid, Playboi Carti, Swims, Metro Boomin, Hozier, Sabrina Carpenter and Shaboozey―reaching the top spot for the first time. Kendrick Lamar scored three number ones while Ariana Grande, Malone and Wallen scored two each, as the only acts to achieve multiple number-one songs in 2024.

== Chart history ==
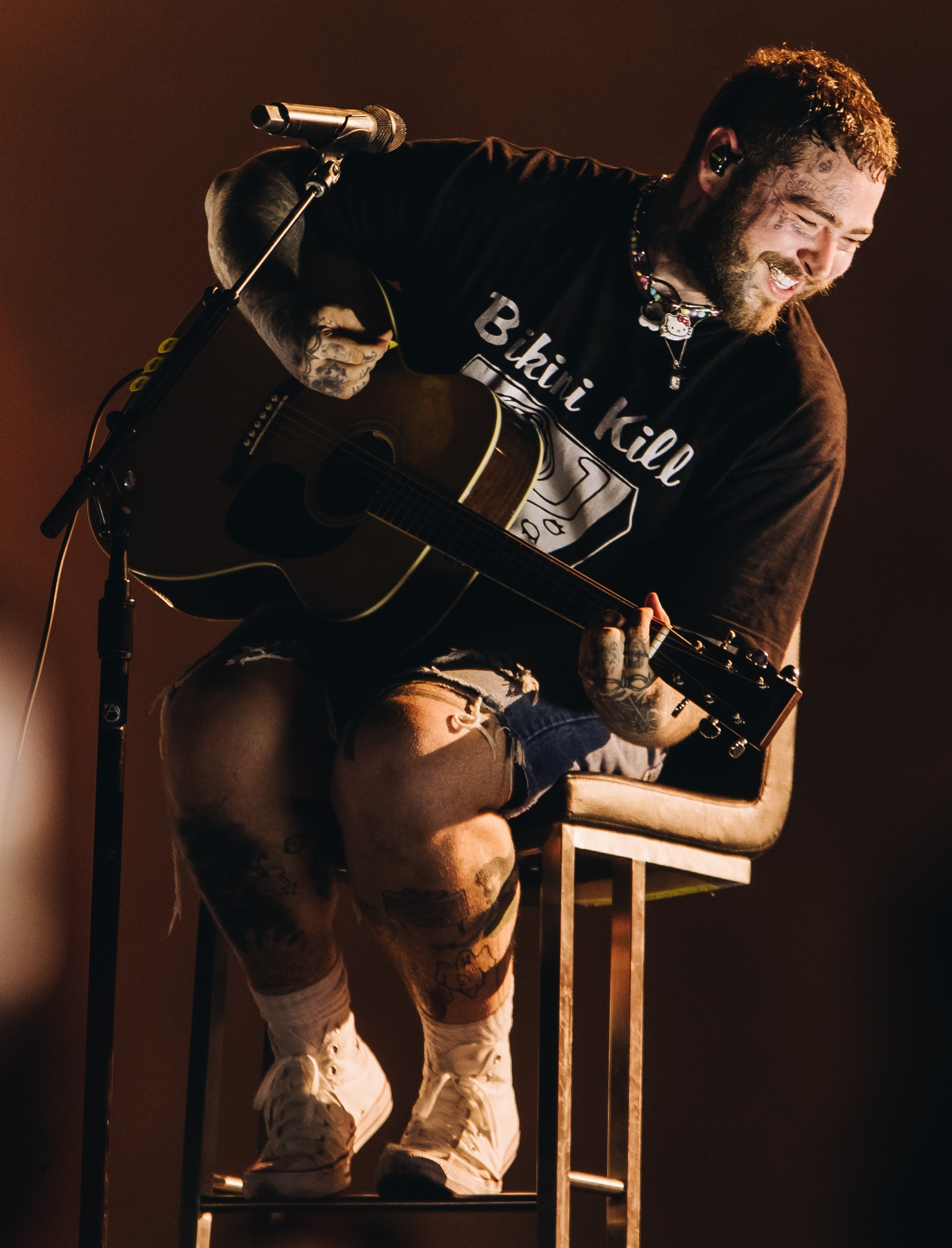
Post Malone topped the chart for eight weeks with the Taylor Swift collaboration "Fortnight" and his single "I Had Some Help" featuring Morgan Wallen.

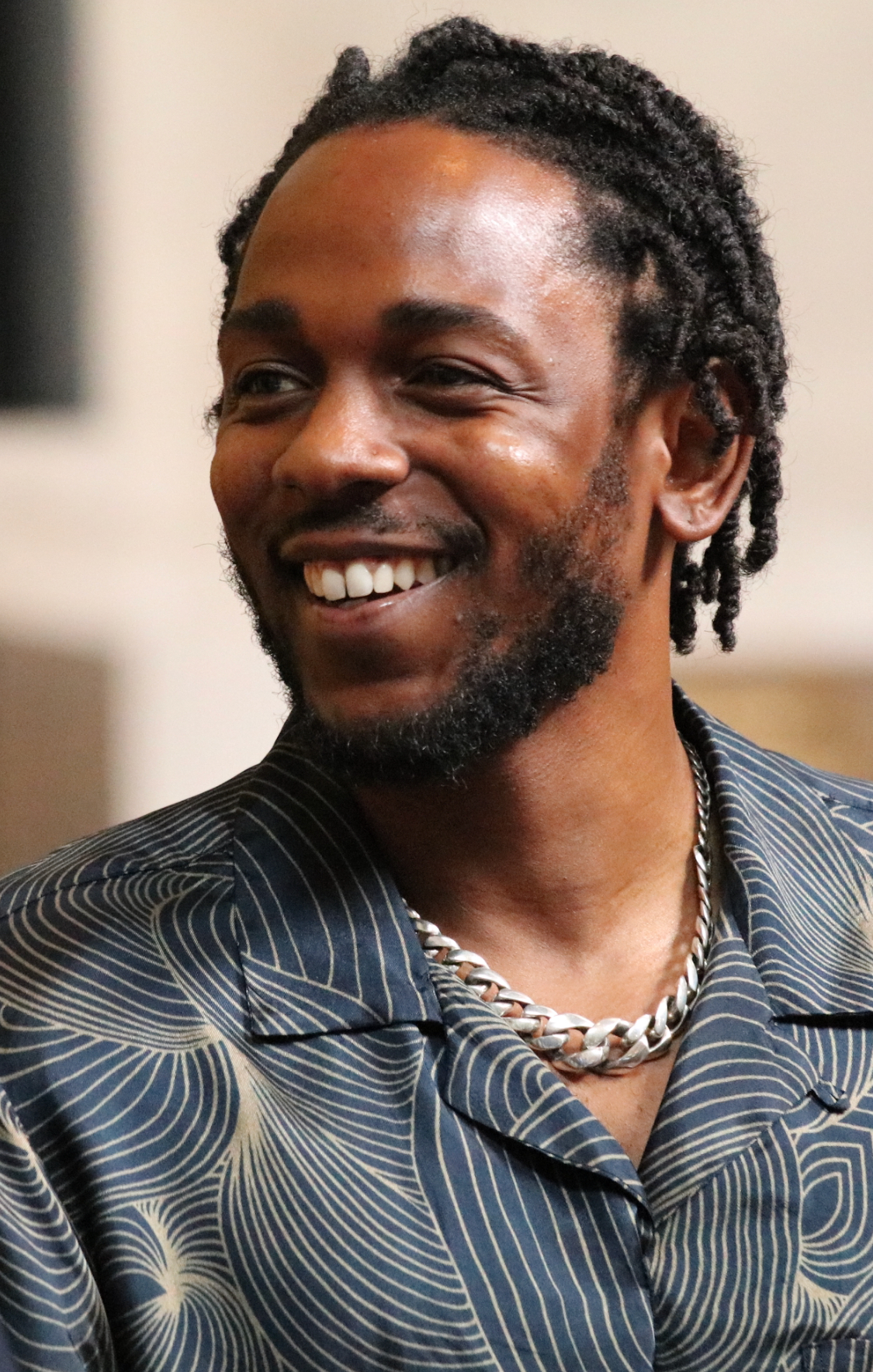
Kendrick Lamar spent six weeks at number one with "Like That", "Not Like Us" and "Squabble Up".

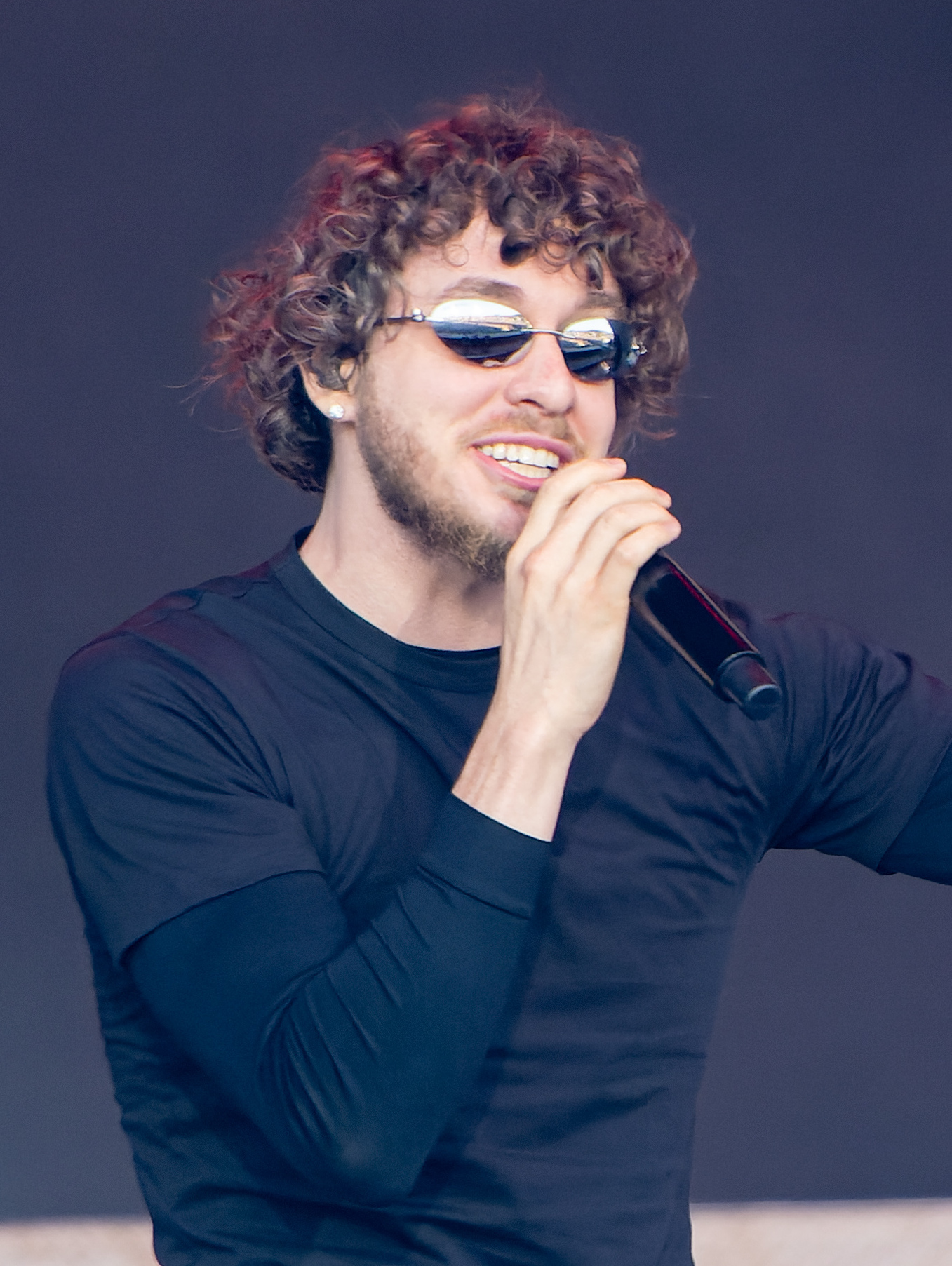
American rapper Jack Harlow topped the chart for five weeks with "Lovin on Me", which had previously hit number one for one week in 2023.

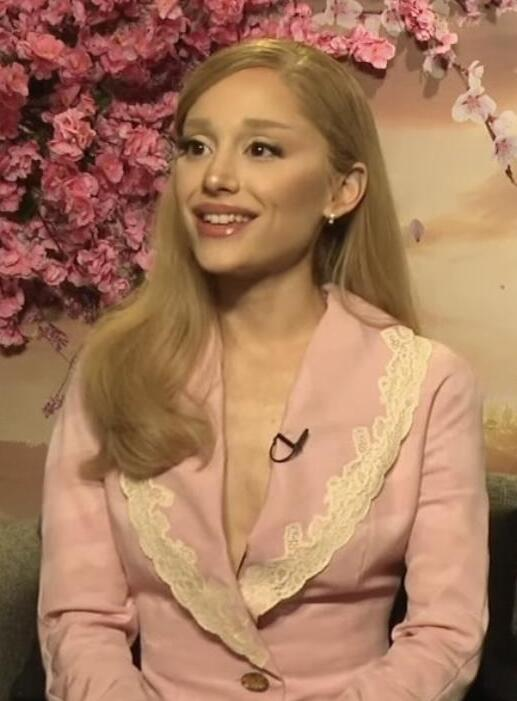
Ariana Grande's "Yes, And?" and "We Can't Be Friends (Wait for Your Love)" spent one week atop the chart each.

Key
†	Indicates best-performing song of 2024

No.	Issue date	Song	Artist(s)	Ref.
re	January 6	"Rockin' Around the Christmas Tree"	Brenda Lee	
re	January 13	"Lovin on Me"	Jack Harlow	
re	January 20	"Lovin on Me"	Jack Harlow	
1162	January 27	"Yes, And?"	Ariana Grande	
re	February 3	"Lovin on Me"	Jack Harlow	
1163	February 10	"Hiss"	Megan Thee Stallion	
re	February 17	"Lovin on Me"	Jack Harlow	
re	February 24	"Lovin on Me"	Jack Harlow	
1164	March 2	"Texas Hold 'Em"	Beyoncé	
1164	March 9	"Texas Hold 'Em"	Beyoncé	
1165	March 16	"Carnival"	¥$: Ye and Ty Dolla Sign featuring Rich the Kid and Playboi Carti	
1166	March 23	"We Can't Be Friends (Wait for Your Love)"	Ariana Grande	
1167	March 30	"Lose Control" †	Teddy Swims	
1168	April 6	"Like That"	Future, Metro Boomin and Kendrick Lamar	
1168	April 13	"Like That"	Future, Metro Boomin and Kendrick Lamar	
1168	April 20	"Like That"	Future, Metro Boomin and Kendrick Lamar	
1169	April 27	"Too Sweet"	Hozier	
1170	May 4	"Fortnight"	Taylor Swift featuring Post Malone	
1170	May 11	"Fortnight"	Taylor Swift featuring Post Malone	
1171	May 18	"Not Like Us"	Kendrick Lamar	
1172	May 25	"I Had Some Help"	Post Malone featuring Morgan Wallen	
1172	June 1	"I Had Some Help"	Post Malone featuring Morgan Wallen	
1172	June 8	"I Had Some Help"	Post Malone featuring Morgan Wallen	
1172	June 15	"I Had Some Help"	Post Malone featuring Morgan Wallen	
1172	June 22	"I Had Some Help"	Post Malone featuring Morgan Wallen	
1173	June 29	"Please Please Please"	Sabrina Carpenter	
re	July 6	"I Had Some Help"	Post Malone featuring Morgan Wallen	
1174	July 13	"A Bar Song (Tipsy)"	Shaboozey	
re	July 20	"Not Like Us"	Kendrick Lamar	
re	July 27	"A Bar Song (Tipsy)"	Shaboozey	
re	August 3	"A Bar Song (Tipsy)"	Shaboozey	
re	August 10	"A Bar Song (Tipsy)"	Shaboozey	
re	August 17	"A Bar Song (Tipsy)"	Shaboozey	
re	August 24	"A Bar Song (Tipsy)"	Shaboozey	
re	August 31	"A Bar Song (Tipsy)"	Shaboozey	
re	September 7	"A Bar Song (Tipsy)"	Shaboozey	
re	September 14	"A Bar Song (Tipsy)"	Shaboozey	
re	September 21	"A Bar Song (Tipsy)"	Shaboozey	
re	September 28	"A Bar Song (Tipsy)"	Shaboozey	
re	October 5	"A Bar Song (Tipsy)"	Shaboozey	
re	October 12	"A Bar Song (Tipsy)"	Shaboozey	
re	October 19	"A Bar Song (Tipsy)"	Shaboozey	
re	October 26	"A Bar Song (Tipsy)"	Shaboozey	
1175	November 2	"Love Somebody"	Morgan Wallen	
re	November 9	"A Bar Song (Tipsy)"	Shaboozey	
re	November 16	"A Bar Song (Tipsy)"	Shaboozey	
re	November 23	"A Bar Song (Tipsy)"	Shaboozey	
re	November 30	"A Bar Song (Tipsy)"	Shaboozey	
1176	December 7	"Squabble Up"	Kendrick Lamar	
re	December 14	"All I Want for Christmas Is You"	Mariah Carey	
re	December 21	"All I Want for Christmas Is You"	Mariah Carey	
re	December 28	"All I Want for Christmas Is You"	Mariah Carey	

== Number-one artists ==
List of number-one artists by total weeks at number one
Artist	Weeks at No. 1
Shaboozey	19
Post Malone	8
Morgan Wallen	7
Kendrick Lamar	6
Jack Harlow	5
Future	3
Metro Boomin	3
Mariah Carey	3
Beyoncé	2
Ariana Grande	2
Taylor Swift	2
Brenda Lee	1
Megan Thee Stallion	1
¥$	1
Ye	1
Ty Dolla Sign	1
Rich the Kid	1
Playboi Carti	1
Teddy Swims	1
Hozier	1
Sabrina Carpenter	1

== See also ==
- List of Billboard 200 number-one albums of 2024
- List of Billboard Global 200 number ones of 2024
- List of Billboard Hot 100 top-ten singles in 2024
- List of Billboard Hot 100 number-one singles of the 2020s
- Billboard Year-End Hot 100 singles of 2024
- 2024 in American music
