= Yes, And? =

2024 single by Ariana Grande

- Standard cover (Note: This cover is also used as an alternative cover to physical editions of Eternal Sunshine.)

Single by Ariana Grande

from the album Eternal Sunshine
- B-side: "Eternal Sunshine"
- Released: January 12, 2024
- Recorded: 2023
- Studio: Jungle City (New York City)
- Genre: House; pop; dance
- Length: 3:34
- Label: Republic
- Composers: Ariana Grande; Max Martin; Ilya Salmanzadeh
- Lyricist: Ariana Grande
- Producers: Ariana Grande; Max Martin; Ilya

Ariana Grande singles chronology
"Die for You" (remix) (2023)	"Yes, And?" (2024)	"We Can't Be Friends (Wait for Your Love)" (2024)

Music video
- "Yes, And?" on YouTube

"Yes, And?" is a song by American singer-songwriter Ariana Grande. It was released through Republic Records on January 12, 2024, as the lead single from her seventh studio album, Eternal Sunshine (2024). Written and produced by Grande, Max Martin and Ilya Salmanzadeh, the song is a house, pop, and dance track with ballroom elements. Lyrically, it focuses on self-confidence and preservation, overcoming negativity, while also addressing a range of negative press Grande received between 2020 and 2023.

Music critics complimented the song's production and noted inspiration from Madonna's 1990 single "Vogue". In the United States, "Yes, And?" debuted atop the Billboard Hot 100, becoming Grande's sixth number-one debut and eighth overall number-one single, as well as her 21st top-ten on the chart. It additionally earned Grande her third number-one single on the Billboard Global 200 chart. Elsewhere, it peaked at number one in 10 more countries, and reached the top-ten in another 28 countries.

An accompanying music video for "Yes, And?" was directed by Christian Breslauer and released on YouTube simultaneously with the single. The video drew inspiration from that of Paula Abdul's "Cold Hearted" (1989) and depicts Grande staging a performance for a group of disapproving critics and winning them over. A remix of the song with American singer-songwriter Mariah Carey was released on February 16, 2024. "Yes, And?" received a nomination for Best Dance Pop Recording at the 67th Annual Grammy Awards.

== Background and promotion ==
On January 4, 2024, Ariana Grande was photographed in public wearing a custom sweatshirt that read "yes, and?" to tease the lead single's title, which she had previously done for her Sweetener lead single "No Tears Left to Cry" (2018). Grande later officially announced the song via her social media. Jem Aswad of Variety opined that the phrase "yes, and?" was a successor to "thank u, next", the title of her fifth studio album (2019) and its lead single (2018). Grande revealed that she chose to release "Yes, And?" as the lead single of her seventh studio album, Eternal Sunshine, because she saw it as "an all-encompassing, like, 'What the f---?'", and "it [gave] us a lot of a place to go". She said: "it's kind of like the 'Thank U, Next' formula [...] 'cause it's like, 'Thank U, Next' came first because it had to".

Links to pre-save "Yes, And?" on streaming platforms and pre-order the 7-inch vinyl and CD single were first shared on the Sweetener Instagram page. Additionally, the track was issued via cassette. 14 iterations of the song were made available for digital download and on streaming services: its original version, an edit, an extended mix, an a cappella version and slowed and sped up mixes, each in clean and explicit options, as well instrumental and extended mix instrumental versions. On February 16, 2024, a remix with American singer Mariah Carey was released. Three more remixes of the song by The Blessed Madonna's Godsquad, Jonas Blue, and Felix Jaehn, respectively, followed on February 20, 2024. On January 2, 2026, the single was released as a Target exclusive 4-inch vinyl.

== Cover artwork ==
The cover artwork for "Yes, And?" was first teased in December 2023 with a defocused close-up of Grande's red lips in R.E.M. Beauty packages sent to fans alongside a note: "See you next year." Grande revealed the full artwork via her social media on January 7, 2024. Photographed by Katia Temkin, it is a blurry shot of the left side of her face. In it, Grande is seen wearing a plain gold earring, black eyeliner, and her brand R.E.M. Beauty's "On Your Collar" lipstick in the red shade "Attention". Refuting speculation that the album was titled Yes, And?, Grande clarified that the image released to promote the single was actually one of several album cover variants. The digital maxi single version of "Yes, And?" features an alternative cover artwork of Grande with her hand on the side of her face.

== Composition ==
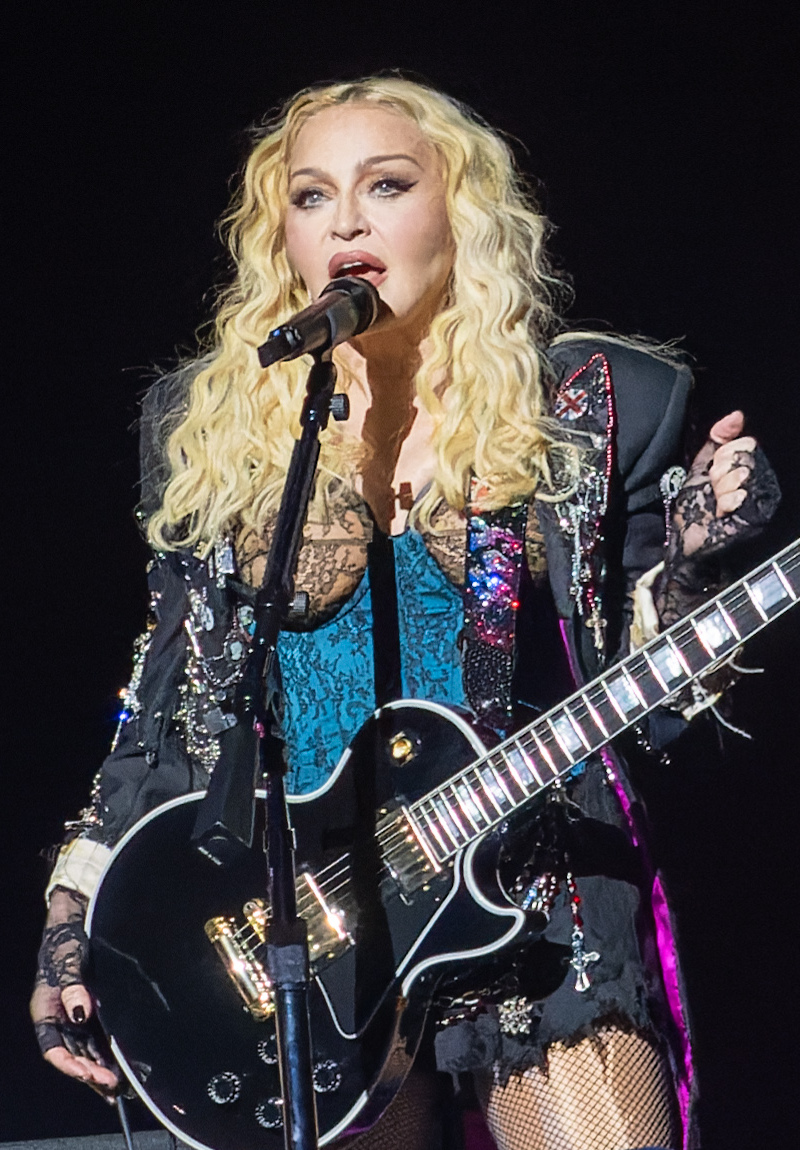
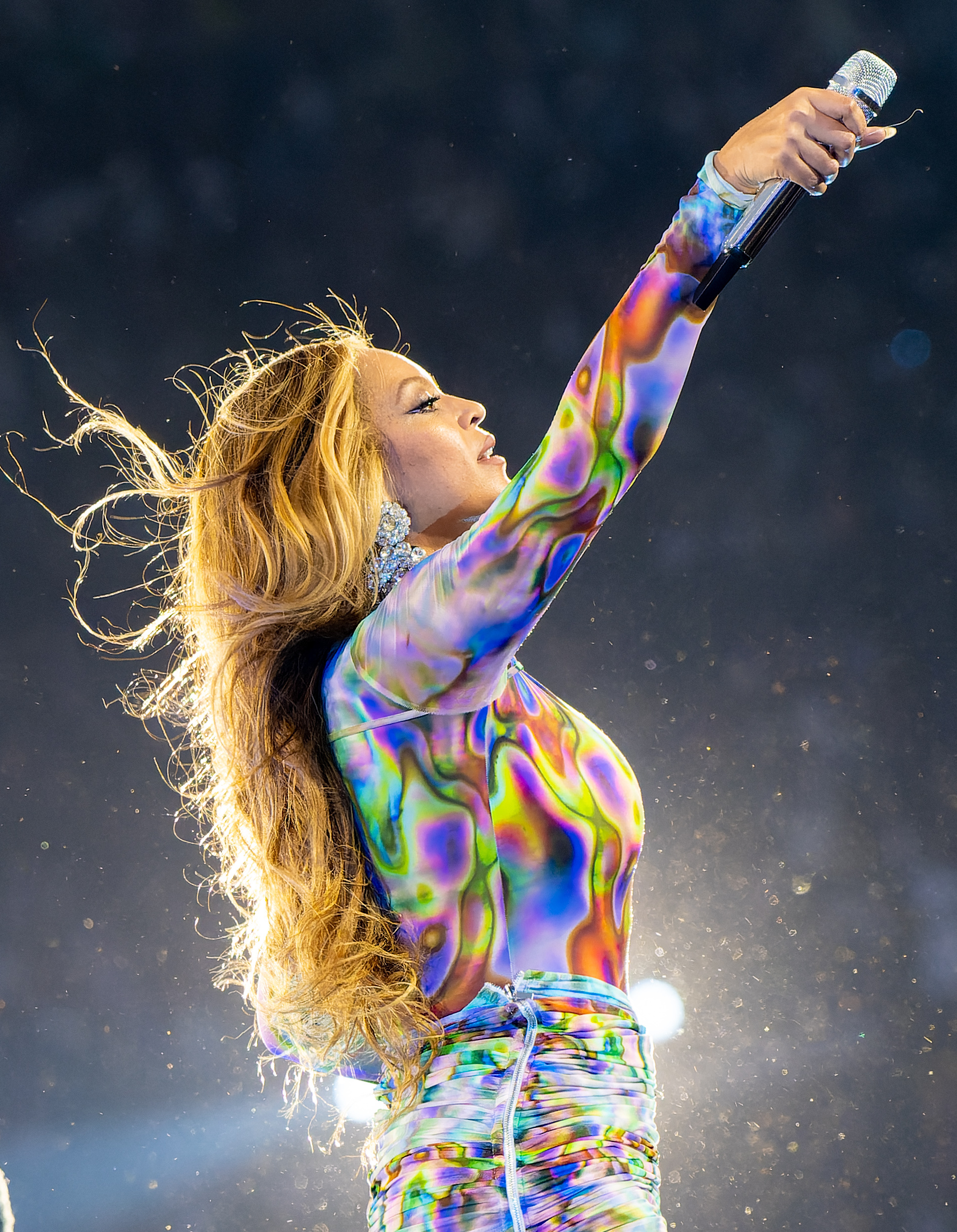
Music critics associated "Yes, And?" to "Vogue" (1990) by Madonna (left) and "Break My Soul" (2022) by Beyoncé (right).

"Yes, And?" is three minutes and 34 seconds long. It was written and produced by Grande, Martin, and Ilya Salmanzadeh. Martin and Salmanzadeh programmed and provided background vocals, drums, keyboards, bass, and piano to the song. Sam Holland and Lou Carrao served as engineers with assistance from Eric Eylands and Rob Sellens. The song was mastered by Randy Merrill and mixed by Serban Ghenea, with assistance from Bryce Bordone.

"Yes, And?" was described as a house, pop, and dance song referencing ballroom culture and drawing inspiration from Madonna's 1990 single "Vogue". It has also been likened to Beyoncé's 2022 studio album Renaissance, particularly its lead single "Break My Soul", and Lady Gaga's 2020 song "Babylon". Lyrically, the song addresses the influence of others' opinions on one's own self. Grande uses profanity over the lyrics, which encourage listeners to overcome negativity. She also denounces criticisms of her personal life: "Don't comment on my body, do not reply / Your business is yours and mine is mine / Why do you care so much whose dick I ride?".

== Critical reception ==
"Yes, And?" received positive reviews from music critics upon its release. In a review for NME, Sophie Williams described the song as "a melodic discourse that responds to a rumour mill in overdrive" and stated that it "presents Grande in her truest form: a flawed but honest human being, seeking to own her narrative and move forward". Writing for Pitchfork, Anna Gaca described the song as a "lightweight dance shuffle with a few barbed words for the critics", and suggested that the track's "theater catchphrase" title is a response to criticism of Grande's then-ongoing relationship with her Wicked co-star Ethan Slater.

Amrit Virdi of Clash stated that, "On 'yes, and?', her controlled harmonies and whistle tones lace through the dance breaks while layered production helps to add strong ad-libs towards the end of the track […] And the song's chorus is incredibly catchy – it's definitely something I can see being played and appreciated in the club." Helen Brown of The Independent wrote that the singer's voice "takes a sweet, light shimmery tone" and is "soft and glancing"; she also noted the "'Vogue' formula in the track's structure", with "a spoken word, bell tolling and handclap-backed section".

Some music critics likened the song to the ballroom atmosphere of Renaissance, particularly the lead single "Break My Soul" (2022). In a review for Vulture, Quinn Moreland wrote that "the track embraces a disco-lite groove punctuated by the occasional sparkly, cascading synth line that will likely dominate pop music post-Renaissance." Laura Snapes of The Guardian praised the "irresistibly effervescent and lithe" production, with a "conscious echo of Madonna's 'Vogue' as delicious as an illicit donut", and "a sign, post-Renaissance, that mainstream pop is embracing house in its purest form".

== Commercial performance ==
=== Billboard Global charts ===
Following its release, "Yes, And?" debuted at number one on both the Billboard Global 200 and the Global Excl. US chart issues dated January 27, 2024. On the Global 200, it became Grande's third number-one single following "Positions" (2020) and the remix of "Save Your Tears" (2021), and achieved 94.4 million streams and 67,000 sold worldwide. On the Global Excl. US, the song became Grande's second number-one single after "Positions", earning 68 million streams and 26,000 sold outside the United States. It spent two consecutive weeks atop both the Global 200 and the Global Excl. US charts. Following the release of the Mariah Carey remix and three additional DJ mixes, "Yes, And?" re-entered the top ten on both charts in its sixth week, surging six and five spots up from number 14 and number 12 to numbers 8 and 7 on the Global 200 and Global Excl. US, respectively. In the chart issue dated March 23, 2024, the track again re-entered the top ten region for a week on both charts, at number 7 on each tally; after the release of Eternal Sunshine.

=== North America ===
In the United States, industry personnel projected the song to debut atop the US Billboard Hot 100, displacing Jack Harlow's "Lovin on Me" (2023) at the top spot. However, Billboard noted a tight chart battle for the number-one position as despite remaining atop Spotify's daily top songs chart, streams for the song on other platforms were becoming unstable, while digital sales were expected to be particularly strong. "Yes, And?" officially debuted atop the Hot 100 chart for the issue dated January 27, 2024, marking Grande's eighth number-one single in the nation and third consecutive, following the remixes of "Save Your Tears" (2021) and "Die for You" (2023). With this feat, Grande tied Beyoncé for the eighth-most Hot 100 number one singles among solo women, while tying Taylor Swift as the female artist with the most number one debuts in history, with six. Grande also extended her record for being the first artist to debut within the top 10 positions of the Hot 100 chart with every lead single—"The Way", "Problem", "Dangerous Woman", "No Tears Left to Cry", "Thank U, Next", "Positions", and "Yes, And?"—of her first seven studio albums. Following the release of Eternal Sunshine, the song rebounded 21 spots, from number 31 to number 10, on the chart issue dated March 23, 2024 — with gains in streaming.

Opening with sales of 53,000 sold in its first week of availability, 41,000 of which were digital downloads, the song debuted at number one on the Billboard Digital Songs chart earning Grande her ninth chart topper there, while achieving the largest digital sales figure for any song in 2024, at the time, according to Luminate. "Yes, And?" additionally debuted at the top slot on the Streaming Songs chart with 27.2 million US streams, marking her fifth number-one there, while lodging 24.8 million radio audience impressions on the tracking week ending January 18, 2024, causing it to chart on Billboard's Radio Songs at number 28. The song eventually peaked at number 19 on the chart issue dated February 17, 2024. It also debuted at number one on Billboard's Hot Dance/Electronic Songs chart and spent six non-consecutive weeks at the top. It became Grande's first solo entry to reach the summit of the chart and third overall following "Break Free" with Zedd in 2014 (nine weeks atop the chart), and "Rain on Me" with Lady Gaga in 2020 (two weeks). On the Billboard Pop Airplay chart, which monitors pop radio stations, "Yes, And?" debuted at number 18 as the highest entry of the week, as well as the strongest entrance of her career on the chart, besting "Bang Bang" which started at number 19 in August 2014. It peaked at number ten. The single additionally debuted at number 17 on the Adult Pop Airplay chart; and reached number 9 on the issue dated March 9, 2024. On the Adult Contemporary chart, which monitors adult contemporary radio formats, "Yes, And?" reached number 23.

In Canada, "Yes, And?" debuted at the summit of the Canadian Hot 100 on the chart issue dated January 27, 2024, earning Grande her seventh number one single in the nation, 22nd top-ten entry, and her milestone 75th overall charting entry of her career. It also debuted atop the Canadian Digital Songs Sales, her seventh leader on the chart and first since "Rain on Me" with Lady Gaga in 2020.

=== Europe and Oceania ===
In the United Kingdom, "Yes, And?" debuted at number two on the UK Singles Chart on January 19, 2024, for the issue ending January 25, 2024, marking Grande's 21st top-ten and 32nd top-40 entry in the country and her first top-three entry since "34+35" peaked at number three in 2021. The song was held off the top spot by Noah Kahan's "Stick Season" which boasted just 600 more overall chart units the same week. However, "Yes, And?" was the most-streamed track in the UK that week according to the Official Charts Company, registering 8.2 million streams, as well as being the top selling song of the week across downloads and physical sales. Likewise, "Yes, And?" debuted at number two on the Irish Singles Chart for the chart issue dated January 19, 2024.

Elsewhere in Europe, "Yes, And?" reached the summit of the charts in Switzerland, Croatia, and Lithuania. It also peaked within the top-five on singles charts in the Netherlands, Portugal, France, Norway, and Luxembourg.

In Australia, "Yes, And?" debuted at number two on the ARIA Singles Chart for the issue dated January 22, 2024. The song debuted at number three on the New Zealand Singles Chart.

=== Latin America ===
Upon release, "Yes, And?" debuted at number 13 on the Billboard Brasil Hot 100, earning Grande her second entry and first top-20 single since the Billboard Brasil magazine was relaunched in August 2023. In Argentina, "Yes, And?" debuted at number 61 on the Billboard Argentina Hot 100, being the highest-charting non-Spanish language song that week. It also reached the number one position on the Argentina Airplay chart. On the Billboard Peru Songs chart, it debuted at number 17. Elsewhere in Latin America, it reached the top-ten in Chile, Costa Rica, El Salvador, Panama, Paraguay and Puerto Rico.

== Music video ==
The music video contains references to Grande's previous albums, including Yours Truly (2013), My Everything (2014), and Thank U, Next (2019).

On December 19, 2023, it was reported Grande had been spotted shooting a video. Grande later shared a teaser trailer for the song's music video on January 11, 2024. It depicts the acronym "AG7"—a reference to her then-untitled seventh studio album. The geographical coordinates 41.0359° N, 71.9545° W are displayed, which locate Montauk, New York, one of the key filming locations for the film Eternal Sunshine of the Spotless Mind (2004); Grande is a long-time fan of Jim Carrey, who played the lead in it. This was an easter egg to the title of the album, Eternal Sunshine.

Directed by Christian Breslauer and filmed in the Grand Hall of Powerhouse Arts in Brooklyn, New York City, the music video for "Yes, And?" was released via Grande's Vevo channel on YouTube at 10:00 AM EST on January 12, ten hours after the song's release. The visuals were inspired by Paula Abdul's "Cold Hearted" (1989), which in turn was inspired by Bob Fosse's choreography of the "Take Off with Us" scene in the movie All That Jazz, and its "late-'80s energy". One scene in the video for "Yes, And?" features several statues of Grande, which Callie Ahlgrim and Lauren Edmonds of Business Insider observed referenced the cover artwork of her previous albums, including Yours Truly (2013), My Everything (2014), and Thank U, Next.

=== Synopsis ===
The video opens with a group of critics being invited to an event by Grande, through a card that includes the aforementioned acronym and coordinates. As they wait for the event, the critics discuss their negative opinions on Grande, claiming they prefer her past self more and criticizing her new choices.

As the song starts, the critics enter a room, where some statues are placed around a two-story structure with stairs—some of the statues referenced the aforementioned album artworks. The statues then break down as Grande and a group of dancers starting appearing behind the stairs and statues. Grande is seen wearing a Rodarte black-and-white cutout bodysuit paired with a black Alaïa skirt and black newsboy hat. She takes off her hat and tosses it to one of the critics, later appearing on the second story of the structure. She leans on the barre on the platform ledge, before lifting her arms, spinning, and appearing in front of the critics with her dancers. The chorus begins, and they perform some choreography as the critics watch. Following the first chorus, Grande and the dancers are sitting on the stairs, with Grande covering her eyes similar to the pose her statue is seen in.

During the bridge, Grande tours the critics' seating area, while holding a tuning fork to "[cleanse] the energy among the critics". During the last chorus, Grande invites some critics to dance with her as the others watch and cheer them on enthusiastically. As the performance ends, Grande and the other dances revert to statue form. The critics, now supportive of Grande, gleefully leave the room as another group of critics enter, thus creating a cycle.

== Live performances ==
"Yes, And?" was performed as part of a set of live renditions of songs from Eternal Sunshine on the "Slightly Deluxe and Also Live" version of the album, released on October 1, 2024. The performance video was uploaded to YouTube on October 5. The song was later performed on the Eternal Sunshine Tour (2026) as the opening number. Grande and her dancers are seen standing still behind a curtain like statues before the song begins. She wears a custom Ludovic de Saint Sernin lace mini dress and a pair of Christian Louboutin ballet boots, styled by Law Roach.

== Impact ==
"Yes, And?" received attention before and after its release: catchphrases and memes soon arose on the internet, including recreating the single's aesthetic aspect. With its vogue dance style influences, lyricism and catchiness, the song went on to become a gay anthem.

Because of the music video, Vogue's Hannah Jackson credits Grande as one of the artists who are revitalising the art and presence of dance in music videos, alongside emphasizing her "Broadway training" and stating that she "puts her training front & centre" and "her gestures help to tell a coherent story about fame, pressure, judgement". Neon Music's Alex Harris goes deeper into the impact's song on pop culture mentioning "it's a cultural statement, empowering especially those who've felt marginalized or misunderstood. The song's appeal lies in its universal message, combined with Grande's signature vocal prowess that captures the essence of resilience and self-confidence" and "lyrics meaning transcends the boundaries of just another pop song", praising the songwriting.

American singer and dancer Paula Abdul praised the song by posting on social media about the references in her 1989 music video "Cold Hearted," which the "Yes, And?" music video took inspiration, writing “WOW! Waking up to see Ariana Grande pay homage to ‘Cold Hearted’ in her new music video ‘yes, and?’ was EVERYTHING!!! “What an honor!".

== Accolades ==
Awards and nominations for "Yes, And?"
Organization	Year	Category	Result	Ref.
Nickelodeon Kids' Choice Awards	2024	Favorite Song	Nominated	
Weibo Music Awards	2024	Song of the Year	Nominated	
Billboard Music Awards	2024	Top Dance/Electronic Song	Nominated	
RTHK International Pop Poll Awards	2024	Top Ten Gold Songs	Nominated	
SESAC Music Awards	2024	Performance Award	Won	
Grammy Awards	2025	Best Dance Pop Recording	Nominated	
Hit FM Music Awards (Note: The Hit FM Music Awards was established in 2008 to honor Western pop music in China.)	2025	Party Anthem of the Year	Won	

== Track listing ==
Streaming/digital download – single

1. "Yes, And?" – 3:34
2. "Yes, And?" (edit) – 3:10
3. "Yes, And?" (extended mix) – 5:08
4. "Yes, And?" (sped up) – 3:13
5. "Yes, And?" (a cappella) – 3:16
6. "Yes, And?" (slowed) – 4:01
7. "Yes, And?" (instrumental) – 3:34
8. "Yes, And?" (extended mix instrumental) – 5:08

Streaming/digital download – remixes

1. "Yes, And?" (Felix Jaehn remix) – 3:55
2. "Yes, And?" (Jonas Blue remix) – 3:32
3. "Yes, And?" (The Blessed Madonna's Godsquad mix) – 5:01

4-inch vinyl

1. "Yes, And?" – 3:34
2. "Eternal Sunshine" – 3:30

== Credits ==
Recording

- Mixed at Mixstar Studios (Virginia Beach)
- Mastered at Sterling Sound (New York City)

Personnel

- Ariana Grande – vocals, lyrics, composition, production
- Max Martin – production, composition, drums, keyboards, bass, programming, background vocals
- Ilya Salmanzadeh – production, composition, drums, keyboards, piano, bass, programming, background vocals
- Sam Holland – engineering
- Lou Carrao – engineering
- Eric Eylands – engineering assistance
- Rob Sellens – engineering assistance
- Randy Merrill – mastering
- Serban Ghenea – mixing
- Bryce Bordone – mixing assistance

== Charts ==
=== Weekly charts ===
Weekly chart performance
Chart (2024)	Peak position
Argentina Hot 100 (Billboard)	61
Australia (ARIA)	2
Austria (Ö3 Austria Top 40)	3
Belarus Airplay (TopHit)	2
Belgium (Ultratop 50 Flanders)	6
Belgium (Ultratop 50 Wallonia)	5
Brazil Hot 100 (Billboard)	13
Bulgaria Airplay (PROPHON)	5
Canada Hot 100 (Billboard)	1
Canada AC (Billboard)	19
Canada CHR/Top 40 (Billboard)	6
Canada Hot AC (Billboard)	12
Chile Airplay (Monitor Latino)	6
CIS Airplay (TopHit)	5
Costa Rica Airplay (Monitor Latino)	8
Croatia International Airplay (Top lista)	1
Czech Republic Singles Digital (ČNS IFPI)	17
Denmark (Tracklisten)	9
El Salvador Airplay (Monitor Latino)	8
Estonia Airplay (TopHit)	3
Finland (Suomen virallinen lista)	20
France (SNEP)	4
Germany (GfK)	8
Global 200 (Billboard)	1
Greece International (IFPI)	1
Honduras Airplay (Monitor Latino)	9
Hong Kong (Billboard)	14
Hungary (Editors' Choice Top 40)	14
Hungary (Single Top 40)	13
Iceland (Tónlistinn)	5
India International (IMI)	18
Ireland (IRMA)	2
Israel (Mako Hitlist)	18
Italy (FIMI)	19
Japan Hot 100 (Billboard)	35
Kazakhstan Airplay (TopHit)	7
Latvia Streaming (LaIPA)	1
Lebanon (Lebanese Top 20)	3
Lithuania (AGATA)	1
Luxembourg (Billboard)	5
Malaysia (RIM)	2
MENA (IFPI)	4
Mexico (Billboard)	25
Moldova Airplay (TopHit)	134
Netherlands (Dutch Top 40)	5
Netherlands (Single Top 100)	2
New Zealand (Recorded Music NZ)	3
Nigeria (TurnTable Top 100)	30
Norway (VG-lista)	4
Panama (PRODUCE)	30
Paraguay (Monitor Latino)	5
Peru (Billboard)	17
Philippines (Billboard)	2
Poland (Polish Streaming Top 100)	6
Portugal (AFP)	2
Puerto Rico (Monitor Latino)	5
Romania Airplay (TopHit)	128
Russia Airplay (TopHit)	5
Saudi Arabia (IFPI)	10
Serbia Airplay (Radiomonitor)	4
Singapore (RIAS)	1
Slovakia Airplay (ČNS IFPI)	22
Slovakia Singles Digital (ČNS IFPI)	10
South Africa (Billboard)	17
South Korea (Circle)	130
Spain (PROMUSICAE)	13
Suriname (Nationale Top 40)	13
Sweden (Sverigetopplistan)	6
Switzerland (Schweizer Hitparade)	1
Taiwan (Billboard)	16
UAE (IFPI)	1
UK Singles (Official Charts)	2
Ukraine Airplay (TopHit)	39
Uruguay (Monitor Latino)	13
US Billboard Hot 100	1
US Adult Contemporary (Billboard)	23
US Adult Pop Airplay (Billboard)	9
US Hot Dance/Electronic Songs (Billboard)	1
US Pop Airplay (Billboard)	10
US Rhythmic Airplay (Billboard)	26
Venezuela (Record Report)	31

=== Monthly charts ===
Monthly chart performance
Chart (2024)	Position
Belarus Airplay (TopHit)	11
CIS Airplay (TopHit)	7
Estonia Airplay (TopHit)	5
Kazakhstan Airplay (TopHit)	8
Latvia Airplay (TopHit)	34
Lithuania Airplay (TopHit)	1
Paraguay Airplay (SGP)	14
Russia Airplay (TopHit)	8
South Korea (Circle)	178
Ukraine Airplay (TopHit)	47

=== Year-end charts ===
Year-end chart performance
Chart (2024)	Position
Belarus Airplay (TopHit)	52
Belgium (Ultratop 50 Flanders)	59
Belgium (Ultratop 50 Wallonia)	60
Canada (Canadian Hot 100)	63
CIS Airplay (TopHit)	55
Estonia Airplay (TopHit)	135
France (SNEP)	184
Global 200 (Billboard)	96
Iceland (Tónlistinn)	75
Lithuania Airplay (TopHit)	6
Kazakhstan Airplay (TopHit)	125
Netherlands (Dutch Top 40)	70
Portugal (AFP)	200
Russia Airplay (TopHit)	88
UK Singles (OCC)	45
US Billboard Hot 100	92
US Adult Pop Airplay (Billboard)	49
US Hot Dance/Electronic Songs (Billboard)	3
Venezuela Anglo Airplay (Record Report)	1

Year-end chart performance
Chart (2025)	Position
Argentina Anglo Airplay (Monitor Latino)	59
Lithuania Airplay (TopHit)	52

== Certifications ==
Certifications
Region	Certification	Certified units/sales
Australia (ARIA)	2× Platinum	140,000^{‡}
Austria (IFPI Austria)	Gold	15,000^{‡}
Belgium (BRMA)	Gold	20,000^{‡}
Brazil (Pro-Música Brasil)	2× Diamond	320,000^{‡}
Canada (Music Canada)	2× Platinum	160,000^{‡}
Denmark (IFPI Danmark)	Gold	45,000^{‡}
France (SNEP)	Platinum	200,000^{‡}
Hungary (MAHASZ)	Gold	2,000^{‡}
Italy (FIMI)	Gold	50,000^{‡}
New Zealand (RMNZ)	Platinum	30,000^{‡}
Norway (IFPI Norway)	Gold	30,000^{‡}
Poland (ZPAV)	Platinum	50,000^{‡}
Portugal (AFP)	Gold	5,000^{‡}
Spain (Promusicae)	Gold	30,000^{‡}
Switzerland (IFPI Switzerland)	Gold	15,000^{‡}
United Kingdom (BPI)	Platinum	600,000^{‡}
United States (RIAA)	2× Platinum	2,000,000^{‡}
Streaming
Central America (CFC)	Gold	3,500,000^{†}
^{‡} Sales+streaming figures based on certification alone.^{†} Streaming-only figures based on certification alone.

== Release history ==
"Yes, And?" release history
Region	Date	Format(s)	Version(s)	Label	Ref.
Various	January 12, 2024	Digital download; streaming	Original	Republic	
Various	January 15, 2024	Digital download; streaming	Extended mix; instrumental; extended mix instrumental	Republic	
United Kingdom	January 15, 2024	Cassette; CD	Original	Island	
United States	January 15, 2024	CD	Original	Republic	
United States	January 16, 2024	Contemporary hit radio; hot adult contemporary radio	Original	Republic	
Various	January 16, 2024	Digital download; streaming	Edit; sped up; a cappella; slowed	Republic	
United Kingdom	January 17, 2024	7-inch vinyl	Original	Island	
Italy	January 18, 2024	Radio airplay	Original	Universal	
United States	February 9, 2024	7-inch vinyl	Original	Republic	
Various	February 20, 2024	Digital download; streaming	Felix Jaehn remix; Jonas Blue remix; The Blessed Madonna's Godsquad mix	Republic	
United States	January 2, 2026	4-inch vinyl	Original	Republic	

== Mariah Carey remix ==
"Yes, And?" (remix)

Single by Ariana Grande and Mariah Carey

from the album Eternal Sunshine (Slightly Deluxe)
- Released: February 16, 2024
- Studio: Jungle City (New York City); MXM Studios (Stockholm); Decoy Studios (Suffolk)
- Length: 3:34
- Label: Republic
- Songwriters: Ariana Grande; Max Martin; Ilya Salmanzadeh; Mariah Carey
- Producers: Ariana Grande; Max Martin; Ilya

Mariah Carey singles chronology
"Circles" (2023)	"Yes, And?" (remix) (2024)	"Type Dangerous" (2025)

Lyric video
- "Yes, And?" (remix) on YouTube

On February 14, 2024, Grande announced a remix of "Yes, And?" with American singer-songwriter Mariah Carey. Both singers began to subtly tease the remix by changing their Instagram profile photos to a foil Polaroid photo of their eyes. The song was released on February 16, alongside an accompanying lyric video uploaded to YouTube. It marked Grande's second collaboration with Carey after the remix of "Oh Santa!" (2020), also featuring Jennifer Hudson. Grande has cited Carey as her "lifelong inspiration".

The remix was included as the final bonus track on the "Slightly Deluxe" edition of Eternal Sunshine, released on March 10, 2024. It was also included in the physical edition of the Brighter Days Ahead deluxe reissue.

Jason Lipshutz of Billboard wrote that, "pairing Ariana Grande with Mariah Carey was always going to lead to vocal fireworks"; he also described Carey's vocals as a "chill-inducing moment" when she introduced the phrase “Now, I'm so done with sharing” on the second verse, stating that Carey "sounds phenomenal, but her personality is even more commanding than her voice".

=== Credits and personnel ===
- Ariana Grande – vocals, composition, lyrics, production
- Mariah Carey – vocals, composition, lyrics
- Max Martin – composition, production, drums, keyboards, bass, programming, background vocals
- Ilya Salmanzadeh – composition, production, drums, keyboards, piano, bass, programming, background vocals
- Sam Holland – engineering
- Lou Carrao – engineering
- Brian Garten – engineering (Mariah Carey vocal)
- Eric Eylands – engineering assistance
- Rob Sellens – engineering assistance
- Randy Merrill – mastering
- Serban Ghenea – mixing
- Bryce Bordone – mixing assistance

=== Charts ===
==== Weekly charts ====
Weekly chart performance (remix)
Chart (2024)	Peak position
Estonia Airplay (TopHit)	11
Japan Hot Overseas (Billboard Japan)	3
New Zealand Hot Singles (RMNZ)	10
South Korea Download (Circle)	189

==== Monthly charts ====
Monthly chart performance (remix)
Chart (2024)	Position
Estonia Airplay (TopHit)	19

=== Release history ===
Release history and formats for "Yes, And?" (remix)
Region	Date	Format(s)	Label	Ref.
Various	February 16, 2024	Digital download; streaming	Republic	
Italy	February 16, 2024	Radio airplay	Universal	
United States	February 16, 2024	CD	Republic	
Germany	March 8, 2024	CD	Universal	
Spain	March 8, 2024	CD	Universal	
United Kingdom	March 8, 2024	CD	Island	

== See also ==
- List of Billboard Global 200 number ones of 2024
- List of Billboard Global 200 top-ten singles in 2024
- List of Billboard Hot 100 number ones of 2024
- List of Billboard Hot 100 number-one singles of the 2020s
- List of Billboard Hot 100 top-ten singles in 2024
- List of Billboard Digital Song Sales number ones of 2024
- List of Billboard Streaming Songs number ones of 2024
- List of Billboard number-one dance songs of 2024
- List of Canadian Hot 100 number-one singles of 2024
- List of UK top-ten singles in 2024
