= Texas Hold 'Em (song) =

2024 single by Beyoncé

Single by Beyoncé

from the album Cowboy Carter
- Released: February 11, 2024
- Studio: APG; Dezert Flower; Kings Landing West; Parkwood West (Los Angeles); The Trailer (East Hampton, New York)
- Genre: Country pop; western; soul
- Length: 3:53
- Label: Parkwood; Columbia
- Songwriters: Beyoncé Knowles; Brian Bates; Elizabeth Lowell Boland; Atia Boggs; Megan Bülow; Nathan Ferraro; Raphael Saadiq
- Producers: Beyoncé; Killah B; Nathan Ferraro

Beyoncé singles chronology
"My House" (2023)	"Texas Hold 'Em" and "16 Carriages" (2024)	"II Most Wanted" (2024)

Visualizer
- "Texas Hold 'Em" on YouTube

"Texas Hold 'Em" is a song recorded by American singer and songwriter Beyoncé from her eighth studio album, Cowboy Carter (2024). It serves as the album's joint-lead single alongside "16 Carriages". The song was a surprise release and debuted during Super Bowl LVIII on February 11, 2024, through Parkwood Entertainment and Columbia Records. Titled after the poker game variant, "Texas Hold 'Em" is an uptempo country pop, western, and soul song featuring elements of folk.

Music critics praised "Texas Hold 'Em" for its playful tone, authentic sound, Beyoncé's vocal performance, and its celebration of the Black roots of country music. Country artists and country radio managers also praised the song for elevating the accessibility of country music for a wider audience. It ignited discussions on Black musicians' place within country music, boosted the listenership of Black country artists and country radio in general, and increased the popularity of Western wear and culture. It was nominated for Record of the Year, Song of the Year, and Best Country Song at the 67th Annual Grammy Awards.

"Texas Hold 'Em" was an international commercial success and marked several historical achievements. In the United States, it topped the Billboard Hot 100, becoming Beyoncé's ninth solo number one single. Additionally, the song debuted atop the Hot Country Songs chart, making Beyoncé the first Black woman with a number-one country song in Billboard history. Outside of the United States, "Texas Hold 'Em" topped the singles charts in several countries including Belgium (Flanders), Canada, Iceland, Ireland, the Netherlands, New Zealand, and the United Kingdom, as well as the Billboard Global 200, earning Beyoncé her first number-one song and the first ever country song to do so since that chart's inception in 2020. The song also peaked within the top ten of the charts in other various countries.

== Background ==
Beyoncé was born and raised in Houston, Texas, where the city's cowboy heritage and zydeco music played a role in her upbringing. She listened to country music from an early age, particularly from her paternal grandfather. She attended the Houston Livestock Show and Rodeo every year with her family wearing western clothing, and later performed at the Rodeo four times between 2001 and 2007. Throughout her career, Beyoncé has celebrated her Southern roots, such as implementing elements of country music on B'Day (2006), performing a country version of "Irreplaceable" with Sugarland in 2007, celebrating her country and Southern identity on "Formation" (2016), releasing the country track "Daddy Lessons" from Lemonade (2016) and later performing the song with The Chicks at the 2016 CMA Awards, spotlighting Southern culture during her 2018 Coachella performance, and centering her pride about her Southern country roots on "Black Parade" (2020). In 2021, Beyoncé released the Ivy Park x Adidas "Rodeo" clothing line inspired by "the overlooked history of the American Black cowboy"; Beyoncé commented on the collection saying: "Many of them were originally called cowhands, who experienced great discrimination and were often forced to work with the worst, most temperamental horses. They took their talents and formed the Soul Circuit. Through time, these Black rodeos showcased incredible performers and helped us reclaim our place in Western history and culture."

== Release ==
During Super Bowl LVIII, Beyoncé starred in a commercial with actor Tony Hale for Verizon. Her appearance was teased by the company in the days leading up to the Super Bowl with teaser trailers featuring her sixth and seventh studio albums, Lemonade and Renaissance (2022), respectively. At the end of the commercial, which sees the singer attempt to "break the Internet" in various ways, Beyoncé says, "Okay, they are ready. Drop the new music" leading to media speculation of the second act of her ongoing album trilogy.

Beyoncé then took to her Instagram account and announced her eighth studio album, tentatively titled Act II, later revealed to be titled Cowboy Carter, with a release date of March 29, 2024.This announcement came through a teaser featuring an unidentified woman starting up a car with a license plate that read "Texas Hold 'Em". As she drives up an empty road, she passes by a group of men staring at a billboard. The billboard features the same slogan as the license plate. It includes a cutout of Beyoncé in a seductive pose. As the Super Bowl continued, she released two tracks from the album to streaming services and digital download: "Texas Hold 'Em" and "16 Carriages".

== Composition ==
Named after the poker game, "Texas Hold 'Em" is an uptempo country pop and western inspired soul song. It is in the key of D major and feature elements of folk music. It features a "rapid-plucked" banjo and acoustic guitar introduction that moves into a "stomping" beat. Chris Willman of Variety likened the song to "Daddy Lessons" for its "playful" sound and danceability, while Ben Beaumont-Thomas of The Guardian found whispers of the Jonas Brothers "What a Man Gotta Do" (2020) in its melody.

Beyoncé wrote "Texas Hold 'Em" with Nathan Ferraro, Elizabeth Boland, Atia Boggs, Megan Bülow, Raphael Saadiq And Dahian Martinez; she produced it with Killah B and Nathan Ferraro. Rhiannon Giddens, an American musician and scholar advocating for the reclamation of country music instruments by Black musicians, contributed by playing banjo and viola on the song. Following its release, Giddens commented on the song, writing:

My only hope is that it might lead a few more intrepid folks into the exciting history of the banjo. I used to say many times as soon as Beyoncé puts the banjo on a track my job is done. Well, I didn't expect the banjo to be mine.

== Critical reception ==
In a review for Variety, Chris Willman described "Texas Hold 'Em" as a "genre-embracing and -transcending" track that acts as a radical venture into "unexplored territory", with Beyoncé reclaiming country music as a Black genre. Willman noted that instead of being "genre tourism", Beyoncé is taking a serious and authentic approach to her embrace of country music, exercising her "natural right" to reach back into her roots as a Texas native. The Guardian's Ben Beaumont-Thomas admired the "rootsy and authentically country" vocal and instrumental arrangements, as well as how Rhiannon Giddens's inclusion on the song highlighted her work to deepen listeners' understanding of how instruments such as the banjo was originated by Black musicians.

In an article for Time, Taylor Crumpton wrote that Beyoncé's presence in country music signals the "birth of a new era" in which performers "who have continued to carry on the legacy of country's music heart and soul" are celebrated. Crumpton also commented on how, rather than molding herself to the will of the gatekeepers of country music, Beyoncé "has been country for the entirety of her life," growing up in a community that saw a "cultural exchange between Black, Tejano, and Indigenous communities." Craig Jenkins for Vulture praised how "thornily" the song "plays dealer with a stack of country clichés like wisdom earned in card games and dive bars but pumps them full of lyrics that would make a Grand Ole Opry audience sweat."

Writing for Consequence, Mary Siroky proclaimed "Texas Hold 'Em" as her early song of the summer while lauding Beyoncé's "inimitable" vocal performance. Kyle Denis of Billboard also praised Beyoncé's "impassioned vocal performance", as well as the "slick harmonies" and powerful instrumentation on the track. Will Hodgkinson of The Times wrote that the track "sure is fine", praising the "ultra-catchy melody" and describing it as a soon-to-be wedding classic.

In his negative review, Chris Richards of The Washington Post wrote that the song felt "dull, dry, unimaginative, unnecessary, unconfident and uncool." Pitchfork's Nadine Smith appreciated how the song brought the "parallel worlds" of country and soul music together through its collaborators, but criticized Beyoncé's attempts at "9-to-5 relatability" and "car commercial"-esque production.

Rolling Stone placed the song at #192 on its ranking of the 200 Greatest Country Songs of All Time.

== Accolades ==
Awards and nominations
Organization	Year	Category	Result	Ref.
ASCAP Country Music Awards	2024	Most Performed Country Songs	Won	
ASCAP Pop Music Awards	2025	Winning Songwriters	Won	
ASCAP Rhythm & Soul Music Awards	2025	Winning Songs	Won	
BET Awards	2024	Viewer's Choice Award	Won	
BRIT Awards	2025	Best International Song	Nominated	
Hit FM Music Awards	2025	Top 10 Singles	Won	
Kids' Choice Awards	2024	Favorite Song	Nominated	
MTV Europe Music Awards	2024	Best Song	Nominated	
MTV Video Music Awards	2024	Song of the Year	Nominated	
MTV Video Music Awards	2024	Best Trending Video	Nominated	
People's Choice Country Awards	2024	The Song of 2024	Nominated	
People's Choice Country Awards	2024	The Female Song of 2024	Nominated	
Rockbjörnen	2024	Foreign Song of The Year	Won	
Grammy Awards	2025	Record of the Year	Nominated	
Grammy Awards	2025	Song of the Year	Nominated	
Grammy Awards	2025	Best Country Song	Nominated	

== Impact ==
I was so hyped to see a song like “Texas Hold ’Em” gain worldwide acceptance. Even more exciting was how it helped reinvigorate the country genre across music, fashion, art, and culture, and introduced the world to so much great talent like Shaboozey, Tanner Adell, Willie Jones, Brittney Spencer, Tiera Kennedy, and Reyna Roberts.

— Beyoncé speaking to GQ in September 2024.

=== Black artists in country music ===
"Beyoncé preserves the best of country past and evolves us into a country future that we have never seen... It's such a full-circle moment for me that I almost want to cry. I wanted to see a Black woman get to the top of the charts, and now I can retire."

— Alice Randall, the first Black woman to write a number-one song on the country charts

With the release of "Texas Hold 'Em", Beyoncé was seen as reclaiming country music and bringing it back to its Black roots. It also sparked conversations on the inclusion of Black artists within the country genre. The BBC's Daisy Woodward wrote that Beyoncé's embrace of country music "galvanises" the reclamation of western culture by those who have felt excluded by it and subverts the traditional image of cowboys. American author and country songwriter Alice Randall, in an interview for The Washington Post, affirmed that Beyoncé "is spotlighting and building on a profound tradition" which started with Modern Sounds in Country and Western Music by Ray Charles, stressing that "[Beyoncé] is going to take it even further if the things she's already done in country is any indication," even if Charles wasn't prized by the music genre at the time.

NBC News's Emi Tuyetnhi Tran wrote that "Texas Hold 'Em" has the potential to redefine what it means to be a country artist "in the cultural consciousness." In an analysis for American Songwriter, Thom Donovan reported that "country music's embrace of hip-hop was the natural progression" and "Texas Hold 'Em" is "more than a cheeky metaphor; it's part of the larger arc of Beyoncé's work celebrating the legacy of Black artists". As the singer did with the first act, Donovan wrote that "Beyoncé reminds listeners that country music is another kind of dance music."

The release of the song spotlighted Black musicians in the country music space and boosted their listenership. Black female country musicians saw a significant increase in streams due to the song, such as Reyna Roberts (250%), Rissi Palmer (110%), Tanner Adell (188%) and K. Michelle (185%). Linda Martell, the first commercially successful Black female country artist and the first to play the Grand Ole Opry, saw a 275% increase in streams. Other musicians who saw an increase in demand include Adia Victoria, Amri Unplugged, Brittney Spencer, Mickey Guyton, Rhiannon Giddens, and Sacha. Black-led country organizations such as the Black Opry also received a significant increase in followers. NPR's Amanda Marie Martínez also said that the song has highlighted and boosted the profile of Black country artists. The song, Martínez writes, has revealed the "strong demand" for country music made by Black artists and a "growing community" of Black country fans. In an article for The Nashville Tennessean, Andrea Williams explained how Beyoncé has opened the door for others in country music and proved that Black songwriters, producers, and musicians belong in the genre. Williams wrote that Black people are generally "shut out of country music's creation" and that they "have been waiting for the opportunity to take part in the genre their forefathers helped build, to not be told they're too urban for Nashville studios." With "Texas Hold 'Em", Williams writes, Beyoncé celebrates Black country musicians, proving they are "country enough" and allowing them to receive their due credit and remuneration.

=== Popularity and accessibility of country music ===
"Texas Hold 'Em" marked a cultural shift for country music and boosted its accessibility to a wider audience, according to CBS News. SiriusXM host Mike Muse told Good Morning America that the song is sparking a "global conversation" and "social discourse" on country music and increasing public interest in the genre. Beyoncé's country music will "open the floodgates" for other country musicians, according to BBC News. Country artist Kezia Gill said that Beyoncé's presence will make the genre "accessible to everyone" and "bring in a whole generation" of new listeners. Roisin O'Connor, music editor at The Independent, said that the new track is "a tipping point" for country music, spreading the genre to new audiences. Texas Monthly's Dan Solomon wrote that the song has had a "dramatic" cultural impact, with Beyoncé "remaking country radio in her image."

==== Country radio ====
Country radio managers shared their excitement about the song bringing new listeners. Mike Levine of Go Country 105 said that "anything to make country more approachable is amazing, so it's fantastic," while 93Q Country program manager Travis Moon said it is "exciting not just for country radio, but for the artist and the legacy that she's done in her entire career." Moon noted that instead of just fitting a certain "vibe", "Texas Hold 'Em" has a "fresh" and "exciting" new sound, saying, "Just the way the song is constructed, the vocals are amazing, the instrumentation's fantastic. It fits the vibe of what we're doing on this radio station."

Programmers at Cumulus Media's country stations had a call where they spoke "enthusiastically" about the song, with chief content officer Brian Philips describing it as "a gift". Philips told Variety that it "adds a completely unforeseen, unimagined new angle to country radio... We have 55 major country stations and it's very hard to get them to agree on anything. But everybody at country wants to play it." iHeartMedia chief programming officer and president Tom Poleman spoke of his excitement to play the song on iHeartRadio stations, describing Beyoncé as an "innovator" who "continues to push the creative boundaries in music." SiriusXM senior director of country programming Johnny Chiang also shared his excitement to add the track to Pandora country stations, telling Variety, "It's a good song, and a legit modern country song. And she's iconic, so it's a no brainer....nothing but good for our format."

=== Response from country artists ===
Country icon Dolly Parton recognized the impact that "Texas Hold 'Em" has had, praising Beyoncé as "fantastic and beautiful". Parton continued to laud Beyoncé on social media, posting an image that read: "I'm a big fan of Beyoncé and very excited that she's done a country album. So congratulations on your Billboard Hot Country number one single. Can't wait to hear the full album!" Country singer-songwriter Lainey Wilson shared her excitement about Beyoncé's crossover into country, telling Billboard: "I love it. The more the merrier. Country music is about storytelling and Beyoncé knows how to tell a story, so I think it's awesome and it's awesome for the country music genre. Everybody wants to feel at home and country music makes you feel at home." Hootie & the Blowfish's Darius Rucker expressed himself as a fan of Beyoncé's embrace of country and praised the track as "a great song". Country singer-songwriter Maren Morris described the song as "such a statement," praising Beyoncé's "reclaiming of country music back to Black people." In 2025, Black country music group Chapel Hart and a cappella group Home Free collaborated on a cover version of the song.

== Controversy ==
An Oklahoma country radio station courted controversy after rejecting a request to play "Texas Hold 'Em", igniting a wider debate on Black musicians' place within country music, despite the influence of African-Americans in its origins. "Texas Hold 'Em" was sent to U.S. pop, Hot AC, rhythmic, urban AC, and country radio stations, but in its first 24 hours of release, only 8 out of 150 radio stations considered for Country Airplay played the song. A petition that attributed this to "racism, revisionist history, and gatekeeping" and demanding country radio stations play the song had amassed over 28,000 signatures within a month.

On February 13, 2024, a listener requested Oklahoma S.C.O.R.E. country station KYKC play "Texas Hold 'Em". The general manager Roger Harris replied, writing, "We do not play Beyoncé on KYKC as we are a country music station." The answer went viral and caused a stir on social media against country music stations, leading Beyoncé's fans to flood the radio station with requests to play the song; it started trending on Twitter with #Beyonceiscountry. After adding the song to radio rotation, a representative from S.C.O.R.E. responded to racism and boycott accusations against the singer's music with a statement: "It has to chart a little bit higher for us to add it. But we love Beyoncé here. We play her on our [other top 40 and adult hits stations] but we're not playing her on our country station yet because it just came out." The station further clarified its position, saying it was unaware the song had a country sound until staff members heard it, and subsequently added it to their playlist.

Variety reported that Sony Music, owner of Columbia Records who hold a contract with Beyonce's company Parkwood Entertainment, "did not immediately respond to requests for comment about any plans to promote the song at country radio." After the media attention, CMT added "Texas Hold 'Em" to its branded streaming stations. In the afternoon of the same day, after the impact on social media, Billboard confirmed that Columbia officially sent the song to country radio stations, pointing out that country stations generally do not broadcast songs not supported by the labels.

== Commercial performance ==
=== United States ===
In the United States, "Texas Hold 'Em" debuted at number 54 on Billboard Country Airplay Chart (despite not servicing the track to country radio), with 1.1 million in audience via 100 stations, becoming Beyoncé's first entry on the chart. Beyoncé became the eighth Black woman to land on the Country Airplay chart in history, and the first since Mickey Guyton in 2016. The song also debuted at number 38 on Pop Airplay Chart, with its plays on 98 chart reporters translating to 1.3 million audience impressions at the format. The song was also the most added track on country stations.

The song was a groundbreaking success and marked several historical achievements. It debuted at number one on Billboard's Hot Country Songs, making her the first Black woman to reach number one. Prior to Beyoncé, only seven black women had charted on the country chart. The previous highest-ranking song by a solo Black woman was Linda Martell's "Color Him Father", which peaked at number 22 in 1969; meanwhile Anita Pointer hit number two in a duet with Earl Thomas Conley in 1986's "Too Many Times". The success of Beyoncé’s song also made her the first black artist to reach the top of Billboard's Hot 100 and Hot Country Songs charts at the same time. As well, with this song she became the first artist to achieve a number-one song on this specific combination of seven of Billboard's charts (over the course of their career): Hot 100, Hot Country Songs, Hot Dance/Electronic Songs, Hot Gospel Songs, Hot Latin Songs, Hot R&B Songs, and Hot R&B/Hip-Hop Songs. The song appeared simultaneously on the chart with "16 Carriages", which debuted at number nine. Beyoncé also became the first black female artist to send a country song to the top of the Apple Music Country chart.

The song debuted at number two on the Billboard Hot 100, just 4 days of counting, blocked from the top by "Lovin on Me" by Jack Harlow, becoming Beyoncé's 22nd top-10 and the highest debut of her career on the chart, opening with 19.2 million streams, 4.8 million in airplay audience, and 39,000 downloads. It also debuted at number one on the Digital Songs Sales chart with nearly 40,000 copies sold, becoming her 12th number one. The following week, "Texas Hold 'Em" rose to number one on the Hot 100, becoming Beyoncé's ninth number-one and her 13th including as a member of Destiny's Child. In doing so, Beyoncé became the first black female artist to top the chart with a country song in the chart's history. In its third week, "Texas Hold 'Em" appeared on the Adult Alternative Songs chart, where it became Beyoncé's first chart entry. As Beyoncé's eighteenth entry on Billboard airplay charts, "Texas Hold 'Em" managed to reach from a variety of formats, charting, in addition to aforemetioned Country and Pop Airplay, on Rhythmic, Adult R&B, Mainstream R&B/Hip-Hop and R&B/Hip-Hop Airplay charts. She surpassed Mariah Carey as the female artist with most entries on airplay charts, and tied Pharrell Williams overall, with 18 radio-based listings – besides those, Beyoncé also charted on Dance/Mix Show Airplay, Gospel, Latin, Latin Pop, Latin Rhythm, Rap, Rhythmic, Smooth Jazz and Tropical Airplay, as well as on the all-format Radio Songs chart. "Texas Hold 'Em" officially became the first song in music history to simultaneously chart across US Pop, Hot AC, AC, Country, Rhythmic, Hip Hop, R&B and Triple A radio formats. “Texas Hold ‘Em” was simultaneously #1 on all 3 major U.S. on-demand audio streaming platforms: Spotify, Apple Music, and Amazon Music, the first black female artist to do.

=== International ===
"Texas Hold 'Em" debuted at number four on the Billboard Global 200, with 31.9 million streams and 48,000 download sold worldwide, becoming her second top-ten hit since the survey began in 2020, after "Break My Soul" reached number six in 2022. The following week the song peaked at number one, becoming Beyoncé's first song to top the chart since the chart's inception in 2020.

In Canada, "Texas Hold 'Em" debuted at number 11 on the Canadian Hot 100. It peaked at number one the following week, becoming Beyoncé's second number one song since the chart's inception in 2007 as well as tenth top 10 on the chart. Furthermore, the song reached number 44 on the Billboard Canada Country chart.

In the United Kingdom, the song debuted at number nine on the UK Singles Chart with only three days of sales, becoming the week's highest new entry and Beyoncé's 22nd top 10 song in the country as a solo artist. The following week, the single rose to the top of the UK singles chart, becoming the singer's sixth number one (in addition to two number one singles released as a member of Destiny's Child), and was her first number one single in the UK in almost 14 years. The song went on to top the chart for five non-consecutive weeks, surpassing "Beautiful Liar" (2007) and "Crazy in Love" (2003) as Beyoncé's longest running number one in the country. Official Charts Company stated that "Texas Hold 'Em" became the first female solo country song to reach number one on the chart and the second country record since Lil Nas X's "Old Town Road" in 2019.

In Ireland, the song peaked at number one on the Irish Singles Chart, becoming Beyoncé's first chart topper since 2022's "Break My Soul".

In Australia, the song debuted at number 38 after a partial week of tracking. It later peaked at number two, becoming Beyoncé's 16th top ten single in the country and her highest-charting single since "Telephone" with Lady Gaga (2010). In New Zealand, the song debuted at number 26 and reached number one the following week.

In Brazil, it debuted at number 55 on the Billboard Brasil Hot 100 chart dated March 2, 2024, and following the release of its parent album, it reached number 40.

In Norway, the song debuted at number four, becoming Beyoncé's highest-charting single since "Halo" (2008).

In France, the song debuted at number 136 on the French Singles Chart, her biggest entry since "Cuff It" in 2022. It eventually reached number 4, following the Cowboy Carter release and the Pony remix of the song, becoming Beyoncé's second top-five hit in the country and her first since "Telephone" with Lady Gaga peaked at number three in April 2010. "Texas Hold 'Em" became the first country song to reach the top 5 on the chart.

== Live performances ==
On December 25, 2024, Beyoncé debuted "Texas Hold 'Em" live as the closing song of her 2024 NFL Halftime Show set list, mixing the song's "Pony Up" remix and "Break My Soul" into the live rendition. Beyoncé included the song in the Cowboy Carter Tour setlist, ending the song with an improved remedy of the iconic Beyoncé Bowl riff, before transiting into "Crazy In Love".

== Track listing ==
- Streaming/digital download
1. "Texas Hold 'Em" – 3:49
2. "Texas Hold 'Em" (instrumental version) – 3:55
3. "Texas Hold 'Em" (a cappella version) – 3:48
4. “Texas Hold 'Em" (no outro) – 3:24
- Streaming/digital download – (Pony Up) remix
1. "Texas Hold 'Em" (Pony Up) remix – 3:20

== Personnel and credits ==
Performers

- Beyoncé – vocals
- Lowell Boland – piano
- Lemar Carter – drums
- Nate Ferraro – piano, bass
- Rhiannon Giddens – banjo, viola
- Hit-Boy – synths
- Killah B – drums
- Raphael Saadiq – drums, bass, piano, Wurlitzer
- Khirye Tyler – piano, keyboards, bass

Technical credits

- Beyoncé – production, vocal production
- Matheus Braz – engineering assistance
- Nate Ferraro – production
- Mariel Gomerez – additional production
- Hit-Boy – additional production
- Hotae Alexander Jang – recording engineering
- Killah B – production
- Colin Leonard – mastering engineering
- Alex Nibley – recording engineering
- Andrea Roberts – Pro Tools engineering
- Raphael Saadiq – co-production
- Stuart White – additional production, Beyoncé vocal recording, mixing engineering

== Charts ==
=== Weekly charts ===
Weekly chart performance
Chart (2024)	Peak position
Australia (ARIA)	2
Austria (Ö3 Austria Top 40)	2
Austria Airplay (MusicTrace)	1
Belgium (Ultratop 50 Flanders)	1
Belgium (Ultratop 50 Wallonia)	2
Brazil Hot 100 (Billboard)	40
Canada Hot 100 (Billboard)	1
Canada AC (Billboard)	12
Canada CHR/Top 40 (Billboard)	4
Canada Country (Billboard)	25
Canada Hot AC (Billboard)	8
CIS Airplay (TopHit)	26
Croatia International Airplay (Top lista)	1
Czech Republic Airplay (ČNS IFPI)	16
Czech Republic Singles Digital (ČNS IFPI)	35
Denmark (Tracklisten)	3
Denmark Airplay (Tracklisten)	1
Estonia Airplay (TopHit)	1
Finland Airplay (Radiosoittolista)	27
France (SNEP)	4
French Airplay (SNEP)	1
Germany (GfK)	4
Germany Airplay (MusicTrace)	1
Greece International (IFPI)	32
Global 200 (Billboard)	1
Iceland (Tónlistinn)	1
Ireland (IRMA)	1
Israel International Airplay (Media Forest)	1
Italy (FIMI)	47
Italy Airplay (EarOne)	1
Japan Hot Overseas (Billboard Japan)	1
Latvia (LaIPA)	15
Latvia Airplay (LaIPA)	3
Lithuania (AGATA)	17
Luxembourg (Billboard)	4
Netherlands (Dutch Top 40)	2
Netherlands (Single Top 100)	1
New Zealand (Recorded Music NZ)	1
Nigeria (TurnTable Top 100)	28
Norway (VG-lista)	4
Panama (PRODUCE)	15
Poland Airplay (Polish Airplay Top 100)	12
Poland (Polish Streaming Top 100)	39
Portugal (AFP)	13
Portugal Airplay (AFP)	2
Romania Airplay (TopHit)	24
San Marino Airplay (SMRTV Top 50)	1
Slovakia Airplay (ČNS IFPI)	8
Slovakia Singles Digital (ČNS IFPI)	22
South Africa Radio (TOSAC)	1
South Africa Streaming (TOSAC)	11
Spain (PROMUSICAE)	47
Sweden (Sverigetopplistan)	2
Switzerland (Schweizer Hitparade)	2
Switzerland Airplay (Schweizer Hitparade)	1
Turkey International Airplay (Radiomonitor Türkiye)	6
UAE (IFPI)	15
UK Singles (Official Charts)	1
US Billboard Hot 100	1
US Adult Alternative Airplay (Billboard)	33
US Adult Contemporary (Billboard)	22
US Adult Pop Airplay (Billboard)	7
US Country Airplay (Billboard)	33
US Hot Country Songs (Billboard)	1
US Pop Airplay (Billboard)	7
US R&B/Hip-Hop Airplay (Billboard)	19
US Rhythmic Airplay (Billboard)	7

2025 weekly chart performance
Chart (2025)	Peak position
France (SNEP)	138

=== Monthly charts ===
Monthly chart performance
Chart (2024)	Peak position
CIS Airplay (TopHit)	29
Estonia Airplay (TopHit)	1
Lithuania Airplay (TopHit)	2
Romania Airplay (TopHit)	34

=== Year-end charts ===
Year-end chart performance
Chart (2024)	Position
Australia (ARIA)	35
Austria (Ö3 Austria Top 40)	16
Belgium (Ultratop 50 Flanders)	14
Belgium (Ultratop 50 Wallonia)	10
Canada (Canadian Hot 100)	25
CIS Airplay (TopHit)	126
Denmark (Tracklisten)	34
Estonia Airplay (TopHit)	14
France (SNEP)	38
France Airplay (SNEP)	9
Germany (GfK)	19
Global 200 (Billboard)	41
Iceland (Tónlistinn)	12
Netherlands (Dutch Top 40)	19
Netherlands (Single Top 100)	26
New Zealand (Recorded Music NZ)	32
Poland (Polish Airplay Top 100)	62
Sweden (Sverigetopplistan)	26
Switzerland (Schweizer Hitparade)	28
UK Singles (OCC)	14
US Billboard Hot 100	32
US Adult Top 40 (Billboard)	33
US Hot Country Songs (Billboard)	10
US Mainstream Top 40 (Billboard)	35

Year-end chart performance
Chart (2025)	Position
Belgium (Ultratop 50 Flanders)	133

== Certifications ==
Certifications and sales for “Texas Hold ‘Em”
Region	Certification	Certified units/sales
Australia (ARIA)	Platinum	70,000^{‡}
Belgium (BRMA)	Platinum	40,000^{‡}
Brazil (Pro-Música Brasil)	Diamond	160,000^{‡}
Canada (Music Canada)	4× Platinum	320,000^{‡}
Denmark (IFPI Danmark)	Platinum	90,000^{‡}
France (SNEP)	Diamond	333,333^{‡}
Germany (BVMI)	Gold	300,000^{‡}
Hungary (MAHASZ)	Platinum	4,000^{‡}
Italy (FIMI)	Gold	50,000^{‡}
New Zealand (RMNZ)	2× Platinum	60,000^{‡}
Poland (ZPAV)	Platinum	50,000^{‡}
Portugal (AFP)	Gold	5,000^{‡}
Spain (Promusicae)	Platinum	60,000^{‡}
Switzerland (IFPI Switzerland)	Platinum	30,000^{‡}
United Kingdom (BPI)	2× Platinum	1,200,000^{‡}
United States (RIAA)	2× Platinum	2,000,000^{‡}
Streaming
Sweden (GLF)	Platinum	12,000,000^{†}
^{‡} Sales+streaming figures based on certification alone.^{†} Streaming-only figures based on certification alone.

== Release history ==
Release dates and formats
Region	Date	Format(s)	Version(s)	Label(s)	Ref.
Various	February 11, 2024	Digital download; streaming	Original	Parkwood; Columbia	
United States	February 13, 2024	Contemporary hit radio	Original	Columbia	
United States	February 13, 2024	Country radio	Original	Columbia	
United States	February 13, 2024	Rhythmic contemporary radio	Original	Columbia	
Various	February 14, 2024	Digital download; streaming	Instrumental; acappella	Parkwood; Columbia	
Italy	February 22, 2024	Radio airplay	Original	Sony Italy	
Italy	April 4, 2024	Radio airplay	Pony Up remix	Sony Italy	
Various	April 4, 2024	Digital download; streaming	Pony Up remix	Parkwood; Columbia	

== See also ==
- List of Billboard number-one country songs of 2024
- List of Billboard Global 200 number ones of 2024
- List of Billboard Hot 100 number ones of 2024
- List of Canadian Hot 100 number-one singles of 2024
- List of number-one singles of 2024 (Ireland)
- List of number-one singles from the 2020s (New Zealand)
- List of Ultratop 50 number-one singles of 2024
- List of UK Singles Chart number ones of the 2020s
