= Black women in the American music industry =

Before the Atlantic slave trade, African people would use music and performance in multiple ways such as, individual expression, historical memory, and ritual. During the enslavement of Africans in the United States, music became vital for the enslaved population. Singing, in particular, was essential for enslaved Africans. Slave songs, or negro spirituals, were often sung by enslaved Black women while they worked in fields, and in secret meeting places.

Over time, Black people, especially Black women, became the backbone of music-making in early America and continue to have a significant impact on the music industry today. However, throughout history, Black women have often been denied the respect they deserve for their contributions to the music industry. Navigating the field with the layered identities of being both Black and female, Black women frequently experience misogynoir, which affects their experiences in the music world. This form of misogyny is rooted in stereotypes and prejudices about their demographic, influencing how Black women are treated and marketed in the industry. For example, Black women have often been labeled as difficult to get along with, which has positioned them in a constant state of comparison and competition, particularly in the eyes of the audience.

Despite their significant contributions to American music and culture, the history of Black women in music is often forgotten or erased. In a male-dominated industry, many Black women have struggled to combat the belief that women cannot achieve the same level of success as men in the same field. In genres such as rap, jazz, blues, and R&B, Black women have had to work twice as hard as their male counterparts to achieve similar recognition, yet many still do not receive the acknowledgment they deserve. They are often overlooked or oversexualized to attract attention, regardless of their talent.

== Early music and the Harlem renaissance ==
In the United States, the introduction of new styles of music came during the Transatlantic Slave Trade era. The genres of music include, but are not limited to, blues, rock, gospel, jazz, bluegrass, and hip-hop. African-American women in the music industry have made significant contributions over the years. Stigmas surrounding African-American women during the 20th century may have made it difficult for them to have a strong presence in mainstream music. Despite this, women were still authoritative in genres of blues, jazz, and R&B.

=== Jazz ===
African-American women have played a significant role in shaping jazz, a music genre with American roots, characterized by improvisation and a fusion of several music traditions, such as gospel, blues, and ragtime. Despite being a historically male-dominated genre, African-American women contributed as both singers and instrumentalists. A key factor for women gaining acceptance amid the prevalence of racism and sexism within this industry was the piano, an instrument deemed socially acceptable for female performers compared to brass and woodwind instruments. These gender-based stereotypes, however, created a negative stigma, making it difficult for women to succeed as individual performers. This trend changed during World War II, as the draft left an opportunity for women to gain popularity and build their image within the jazz scene. Moreover, as jazz evolved over the decades, gender-based discrimination steadily declined allowing female musicians, instrumentalists, and singers alike to establish themselves.

Amongst influential figures such as Dolly Jones and Valaida Snow, Mary Lou Williams emerged as a pianist and composer, widely regarded as one of America's best-known and most revered jazz women. Williams first gained recognition and support from within her hometown, where she developed into one of the most "sought after pianists in Kansas City". Through her compositions, Williams is said to have influenced the evolution of the "big band" sound. Based on her writing techniques, Williams gained the opportunity to compose for many well known jazz musicians such as Louis Armstrong and Duke Ellington. After moving to New York in the early 1940s, a new style of music and sub-genre of jazz, known as “bebop” emerged, which drew on her compositions and influence. Later, Williams went on to lead various women's music groups and founded one of the first women-owned recording companies, Mary Records.

Another influential figure in jazz is Billie Holiday, a Philadelphia-born singer. Despite no formal musical training, Holiday was discovered by John Hammond in the 1930s, marking the beginning of her stardom. Her distinctive sound was influenced by her background and personal experiences. Also known by the alias “Lady Day” which was given to her by close friend and colleague Lester Young, she collaborated with many people including Duke Ellington. In 1938, Holiday made history as the first African American women to work with an all white orchestra, alongside Artie Shaw. Her most known work, Strange Fruit, is recognized for addressing the African American experience. Its influence can be seen through samples and covers by contemporary artists such as Diana Ross, Kanye West, and John Legend. Ultimately, Holiday achieved significant success despite her personal battles with addiction which took a toll on her health, leading to her death in 1959.

Beyond female jazz pioneers, such as Mary Lou Williams and Billie Holiday, several other African American women have contributed to the jazz genre. Among the most notable are Ella Fitzgerald, Sarah Vaughan, Dinah Washington, Hazel Scott, and Lil Hardin Armstrong.

=== Blues ===
The 1920s blues, known as the classic blues, was a genre largely popularized by African-American women. Singers such as Ma Rainey, Bessie Smith, Alberta Hunter, and Ethel Waters were the most popular. Ma Rainey, referred to as the "Mother of the Blues", became popular in the early 1900s. Rainey was the first popular black women stage entertainer to incorporate authentic blues into her song selection. She is known for the "Jump Blues" which incorporated a racy and theatrical style. Bessie Smith, who was known as the "empress of the blues" showcased the classic blues. Smith started her professional career as a dancer in the Moses Stokes Company which Rainey was the lead singer of at the time.

Male-dominated country blues grew in popularity and women fell out of the spotlight for a while because of this. During the 1960s blues revival, about 30 years later, Mamie Smith became the first black women vocalist to record a blues song. While "Crazy Blues" is cited as the first blues recording and also represents the emergence of black women singers into popular music culture. Both black and white consumers purchased the record, and record company executives recognized it as a lucrative marketing segment.

== R&B and its descendants ==
=== R&B ===
Soul and R&B have their roots in the Civil Rights Movement of the 1960s. While these genres have primarily focused on breaking down racial barriers between black and white Americans most of the singers within this genre had Southern roots. They used their music to voice opinions, concerns, and emotions about life. Artists in this genre include Sister Rosetta Tharpe, Bessie Smith, and Aretha Franklin. Aretha Franklin, gained prominence in the 1960s. Franklin signed her record deal at the age of eighteen after singing at her church in Detroit. Some of the most highlighted collaborations were with musicians having a background in gospel music. By reinventing herself musically, she achieved remarkable success, including five number-one hits and a Grammy. In 1967 and 1968, Franklin reached commercial success, recording more than a dozen million-selling singles. Mahalia Jackson was another woman artist known as the "Queen of Gospel" who had an impact on the civil rights movement with her songs. Aretha Franklin covered one of her more popular songs, "How I Got Over". It was a more upbeat version with James Cleveland and The Southern California Community Choir. Both Aretha Franklin and Mahalia Jackson had major songs during the civil rights movement: Franklin's version of Otis Redding's "Respect" and Jackson's "I've Been 'Buked and I've Been Scorned", which she performed at the march on Washington after being asked by Dr. Martin Luther King Jr. Despite their role in popularizing black music and culture, few black women are recognized in the emergence of rap and hip-hop culture in the 1970s-1980s.

=== Rap ===
A version of hip hop emerged in the 1990s that transformed the upbeat music of earlier decades into a thought provoking awareness of the world which seemed to romanticize poverty, drug use, drug dealing and gang violence. Popular Female artists in this genre include Queen Latifah, Missy Elliott, Nicki Minaj, Cardi-B, and Salt-N-Pepa. MC Sha-Rock was named the "mother of the mic as she was the first Female emcee in hip hop. She then joined the hip hop group that were the first ever to receive a record deal called "The Funky 4+1." Sha-Rock helped push Rap into a mainstream spotlight for the rest of America and the world. This genre of music has been criticized for sexually objectifying not only women of color but all women. Artists such as Monie Love and Queen Latifah made music that empowered women, and called for unity between female artists. Latifah and Love's hit single "Ladies First" celebrates women across the music industry. Artists such as Missy Elliott, Lauryn Hill, and Eve were applauded for their efforts as they changed the atmosphere for female artists with their innovation. Hill was a multi-purpose artist, meaning she wrote, produced, and performed her music on her own. Hill was awarded 5 Grammy's in 1999 for her efforts. In modern years of Rap, women's images have become just as important as their musical skill. Modern Female artists such as Saweetie, Megan Thee Stallion, and the City Girls use their sex appeal as the focal point of their music. The language used in modern rap music has been criticized by critics for the prevalence of slang terms such as "bitch," "hoe," "slut," or "thot". Social media has now become part of the music industry as a way for these women to promote music in many ways as these songs go viral and are backed by trends. Some of these women have become the top selling female artists of all time. Additionally, Cardi B and Doechii are the only female solo artists to win a Grammy for Best Rap Album. Women are also back on top of the charts with the songs rapped by Megan Thee Stallion, Doja Cat, Lizzo, and many more.

=== Female rappers point of view ===
Nicki Minaj's concerns and frustrations regarding the Grammy Awards and the broader music industry reflect a long-standing issue of systemic biases and challenges faced by artists, particularly those who are women and people of color. Her argument about being placed in the Pop category instead of the Hip Hop/Rap category highlights the complexities of genre classification and the impact it can have on an artist's recognition and success. The categorization of music genres is subjective and sometimes reflect broader industry trends and biases. Nicki Minaj's comments on the industry's conservative efforts and the elevation of newer artists over longer standing ones resonate with broader discussions about representation and recognition in the entertainment business. The issue of diversity and inclusivity, both in terms of race and gender, has been a recurring theme in the music industry, with many artists advocating for more equitable treatment and opportunities. Nicki Minaj has called for artists to speak out against unfair practices and biases in the music industry which is a reflection of the growing trend where musicians utilize their platforms to address systemic issues. Advocacy for change, transparency, and fairness in the music industry is crucial for creating an environment where all artists, regardless of their background, can thrive and receive recognition. Discussions around these issues are ongoing, and the music industry continues to grapple with the need for systemic change to ensure a more equitable and inclusive space for all artists.

Megan Thee Stallion has spoken on the existing misogynoir in the music industry. After a shooting incident in 2020 involving Tory Lanez, a Canadian Rapper and Megan's partner at the time, the internet avalanched many racial and misogynistic comments towards Megan. To this day, rappers like Drake have mentioned the incident in a "playful" light, making a mockery out of Megan's trauma and pain. These incidences of misogynoir do not exist in a vacuum, and is a part of the broader structure that is the compounding oppression Black women face in the world.

=== Hip-hop feminism ===
Throughout history there has been a lack of respect given to black women and their contributions to the music industry, resulting in the rise of hip hop feminism. The movement tackles problems arising from deindustrialization, racial wealth disparities, and conservative backlash, molded by the social environment of the 1980s and 1990s. Meshell Ndegeocello, an American rapper, singer and bassist Angie Stone, a singer, are two artists that have shaped the conversation. Hip-hop feminism goes beyond gender issues to support the rights of women, African Americans, and LGBTQ+ people. Queen Latifah, a prominent figure in the genre, used "the politics of respectability" to promote women's rights and racial empowerment. Ndegeocello is one of the rising queer feminists of color who brings a nuanced viewpoint to problems like abortion and unjust beauty standards. Changes in perspectives are reflected in the transition from male-dominated hip hop music to women-centered hip hop soul, which allows for a diversity of narratives within black communities. The Grammy-winning song "U.N.I.T.Y." by Queen Latifah was a historic moment that validated the powerful voice of black women in a male-dominated field and sparked discussions about domestic abuse and the commodification of black women's sexuality.

This legacy starts in the 1870s with the Fisk Jubilee Singers, who performed many different genres of music including traditional spirituals, blues, classic jazz and rhythm and blues, also commonly referred to as R&B. The Fisk Jubilee Singers became popular throughout the world for singing traditional spirituals during their tours in both the United States and England.

Hip-Hop Feminism has its roots in attempts to reclaim the positive position of black women in the music industry. Female rapper Monie Love had once said "you could be as good as any man and you still wasn't getting the level of respect that you deserved as a woman on the mic." The conservative backlash of the 1980s and 1990s deindustrialization, as well as the slashing of the welfare state, the attendant gutting of social programs and affirmative action, along with the increasing racial wealth gap, have affected the lived worlds and world views of the hip-hop generation. Hip-hop feminism also aims at reclaiming the sexualization of black women as pleasurable and consensual.

Some notable artists include Me’Shell Ndegeocello and Angie Stone.

Hip-hop feminism has had a political impact with regards to the rights of women, African Americans, and the LGBTQ community. Hip-hop feminism has been largely shaped by a sociopolitical agenda because of this. This has created a second and third wave of black American women who are artists, both of whom share a different opinion through their songs. However, there are theoretical and practical linkages between the generations and their music.

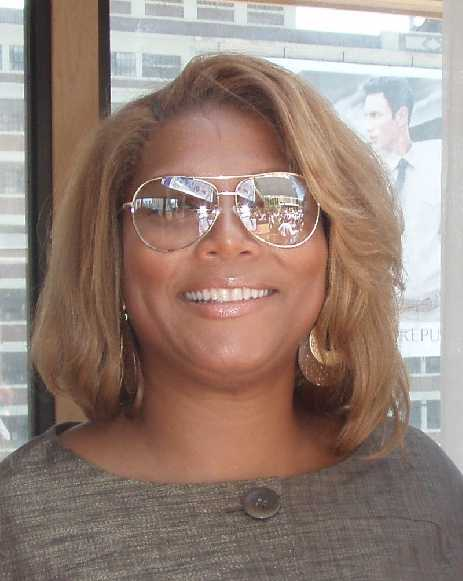
Queen Latifah is one of hip hop's most notable MCs. Her music is known for her pro-black & pro-feminist themes.

One aspect of hip-hop feminism is its use of "the politics of respectability", a term coined by Evelyn Brooks Higginbotham, which describes several strategies for progressive black women artists to more effectively promote a message of racial uplift and women's rights to a bigger audience. These methods largely regard notions of self-respect, honor, piety, and propriety. Respectability politics has been a useful way of improving conditions for African-Americans, by providing black women artists with a platform to talk about the de jure and de facto racist and misogynistic practices they experience.

More recently there has been an emergence of queer feminists of color in hip-hop. One example of this is Me’Shell Ndegeocello, who made her debut in 1993. In her lyrics, Ndegeocello brings awareness to the realities that the black community faces, such as abortion, low-income housing, and unfair US beauty standards. Ndegeocello's lyrics further explore her queer identity in songs like "Mary Magdalene" and "Pocketbook".

Through hip-hop soul women created an aesthetic that represented and engaged in politics of sexuality and gender in working-class black communities. By allowing women in hip-hop soul to offer narratives that highlighted their multidimensional nature, they offered experiences other black women could relate to. The shift from male-dominated hip-hop to women-centered as well as women-told hip-hop soul highlights the shift in previous perceptions of women within hip-hop culture.

Rapper and actress Queen Latifah made history when she won a Grammy for her groundbreaking hit, "U.N.I.T.Y.," in 1995. The song spoke out against domestic violence and the objectification of black women's sexuality. "U.N.I.T.Y." began a conversation in the African American community over violence and assault against women. It also established that black women rappers have a powerful voice in a field unjustly dominated by men.

== Contemporary music industry ==
=== Queen Latifah ===
Queen Latifah released her album All Hail the Queen at 19 years old. The album has feminist themes that attracted a wide audience. She was the first woman MC to ever go gold. Black Reign was her most popular album and included her biggest single, U.N.I.T.Y, which won a Grammy for Best Solo Rap Performance. Latifah speaks publicly about body positivity and inclusivity in women's clothing.

=== Beyoncé ===
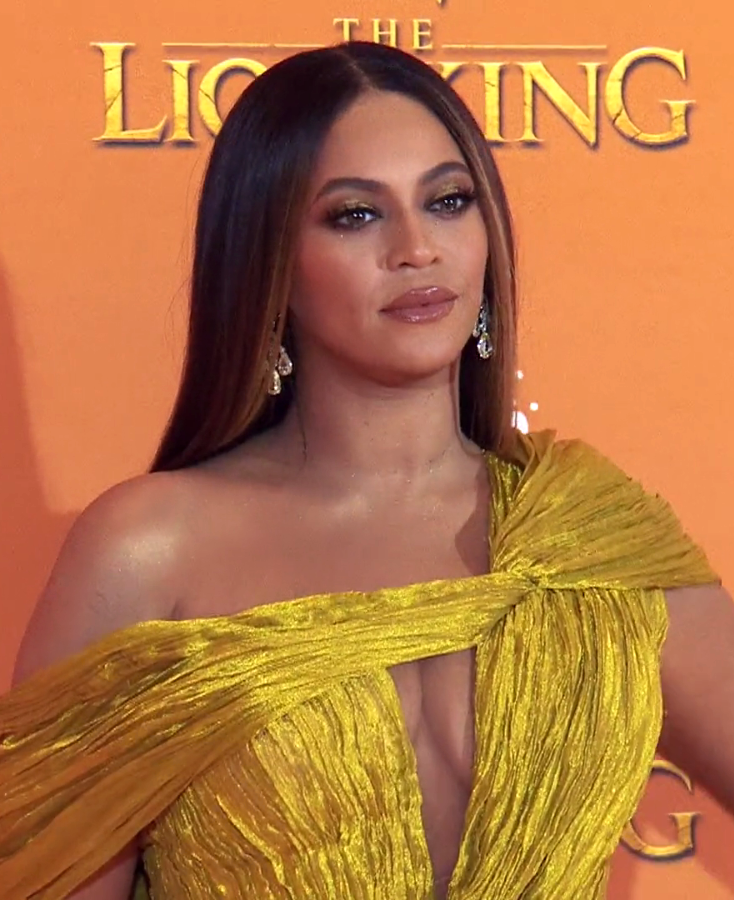
Beyoncé in 2019

Beyoncé began her career in the popular, Grammy winning girl group Destiny’s Child, which was composed of four black women, then later three black women. They are regarded as pioneers of contemporary R&B, rap singing, and of modern girl groups. They frequently sang about the black female experience and empowerment. Songs such as Independent Women Part I and Survivor are examples of this. As Beyonce began to get more control of her career she began to bet more explicitly political and took on a more activist role. In her self titled album, Beyonce, she took on the title of feminist. Lemonade contains the political anthem, "Freedom", which was later used as the official song of Kamala Harris’s 2024 Presidential Campaign. The visual for "Freedom" contains powerful, moving images of black women who have lost black men in their lives. Her 2019 collaborative album, The Lion King: The Gift, features songs such as Brown Skin Girl and My Power which are songs of black love and empowerment, highlighting both the beauty and strength of black women. The visual album Black Is King features imagery of Beyonce with her mother, Tina Knowles, daughter, Blue Ivy Carter, well known women such as Kelly Rowland, Lupita Nyong'o, and Naomi Campbell, as well as many other black women and girls. In Renaissance, Beyonce shows even greater expansion of her intersectionality with the inclusion of queer and transgender black women. Artists Ts Madison and Honey Dijon. With her follow-up album, Cowboy Carter, Beyoncé included four black female country singers: Tanner Adell, Brittney Spencer, Tiera Kennedy, and Reyna Roberts.

=== Other popular women ===
Sylvia Rhone, who is now CEO of Epic Records, has been a pioneer in the music business for decades. She began her career in the music industry with Buddah Records in 1974, and went on to spend time at ABC Records, Ariola Records, Elektra, Atlantic Records, and finally Epic Records. Rhone has gone on to discover and mentor several renowned current artists including DJ Khaled, 21 Savage, Camila Cabello, Travis Scott, Future, Meghan Trainor, French Montana, and many more.

Missy Elliott began in the female R&B group Swing Mob. She went on to collaborate with artists like Aaliyah and Janet Jackson.

== Influence of music videos ==
Studies have shown that Black women are diminished in hip-hop and rap music videos. When black women are represented, it often is portrayed in a way that reinforces stereotypes regarding gender roles; specifically, women are more likely to be shown in submissive positions to men. Black women are often sexualized in hip hop and rap music videos. They are often referred to as video "thots", "hoes", or "vixens". They can often be seen wearing revealing clothing, like lingerie, short-cut shorts or swimsuit. However, in recent years Black women have become more dominant and the gender role can often be switched. Many scholars have argued that women are sexualized in these videos to enhance the hyper-masculinity of the featured male rappers.

Although black women are often hypersexualized in music videos created by male artists, black female performers began to flood once-male dominated positions, such as producers, directors, and cinematographers, they used their new status in the industry to their advantage and attempted to paint a new portrayal of black women in music videos and interviews. Videos, such as Destiny's Child's "Independent Women Pt. 1" and Lauryn Hill's "Doo Wop (That Thing)" gave a new perspective on black women, showing them as having independence and agency. Doechii has been described as subverting the male gaze in the music video for her 2022 single "Crazy".
