= Willie Jones (country singer) =

American country music singer (born 1994)

- Born: September 23, 1994 (age 32); Shreveport, Louisiana, U.S.
- Occupation: Singer
- Years active: 2011–present
- Label: Sony Music (former)
- Website: williejonesmusic.com

Willie Jones is an American country music singer and a former contestant on The X Factor.

== Early life ==
Jones was born in Shreveport, Louisiana, on September 23, 1994, the son of a preacher. He is a graduate of Green Oaks Performing Arts Academy in Shreveport. He learned to sing in his church choir and appeared in musicals at school.

== Career ==
When he was 17 years old, he competed in the second season of The X Factor where he auditioned with Josh Turner's song "Your Man". In 2016 he appeared in the Netflix reality show Chasing Cameron. In 2021, he signed with Sony Music Nashville and The Penthouse and released his first album Right Now which features T.I. Jones also appeared in the 2022 documentary For Love and Country. In 2023, he released his second album/major-label debut, Something to Dance To. However, he was shortly dropped from Sony Music following its release.

In 2024, he was featured on Beyoncé's album Cowboy Carter on the track "Just for Fun", and signed with independent record label Gravel Road Records.

He has toured with artists Shawn Mendes, Michael Ray and Logan Mize.

== Influences ==
Jones has been influenced by a variety of musicians, including John Legend, Sam Cooke, Randy Travis, Darius Rucker and Kacey Musgraves.

== Personal life ==
Jones lives in Nashville.

== Discography ==
=== Albums ===
- Right Now (2021)
- Something to Dance To (2023)

=== Singles ===
Year	Title	Album
2019	"Down for It"	American Dream
2021	"American Dream"	American Dream
