= List of number-one albums of 2024 (Canada) =

These are the Canadian number-one albums of 2024. The chart is compiled by Luminate and published in Billboard magazine as Top Canadian Albums.

== Number-one albums ==
Key
†	Indicates best-performing album of 2024

List of number-one albums
Issue date	Album	Artist(s)	Ref.
January 6	Christmas	Michael Bublé	
January 13	One Thing at a Time	Morgan Wallen	
January 20	One Thing at a Time	Morgan Wallen	
January 27	American Dream	21 Savage	
February 3	Stick Season	Noah Kahan	
February 10	Stick Season	Noah Kahan	
February 17	Stick Season	Noah Kahan	
February 24	Vultures 1	¥$: Kanye West and Ty Dolla Sign	
March 2	Stick Season	Noah Kahan	
March 9	Stick Season	Noah Kahan	
March 16	Stick Season	Noah Kahan	
March 23	Eternal Sunshine	Ariana Grande	
March 30	Eternal Sunshine	Ariana Grande	
April 6	We Don't Trust You	Future and Metro Boomin	
April 13	Cowboy Carter	Beyoncé	
April 20	Stick Season	Noah Kahan	
April 27	Stick Season	Noah Kahan	
May 4	The Tortured Poets Department †	Taylor Swift	
May 11	The Tortured Poets Department †	Taylor Swift	
May 18	The Tortured Poets Department †	Taylor Swift	
May 25	The Tortured Poets Department †	Taylor Swift	
June 1	Hit Me Hard and Soft	Billie Eilish	
June 8	The Tortured Poets Department †	Taylor Swift	
June 15	The Tortured Poets Department †	Taylor Swift	
June 22	The Tortured Poets Department †	Taylor Swift	
June 29	The Tortured Poets Department †	Taylor Swift	
July 6	The Tortured Poets Department †	Taylor Swift	
July 13	The Tortured Poets Department †	Taylor Swift	
July 20	The Great American Bar Scene	Zach Bryan	
July 27	The Death of Slim Shady (Coup de Grâce)	Eminem	
August 3	The Death of Slim Shady (Coup de Grâce)	Eminem	
August 10	The Death of Slim Shady (Coup de Grâce)	Eminem	
August 17	Vultures 2	¥$: Kanye West and Ty Dolla Sign	
August 24	The Tortured Poets Department †	Taylor Swift	
August 31	F-1 Trillion	Post Malone	
September 7	Short n' Sweet	Sabrina Carpenter	
September 14	Short n' Sweet	Sabrina Carpenter	
September 21	Short n' Sweet	Sabrina Carpenter	
September 28	Short n' Sweet	Sabrina Carpenter	
October 5	Short n' Sweet	Sabrina Carpenter	
October 12	Short n' Sweet	Sabrina Carpenter	
October 19	Short n' Sweet	Sabrina Carpenter	
October 26	Short n' Sweet	Sabrina Carpenter	
November 2	Short n' Sweet	Sabrina Carpenter	
November 9	Chromakopia	Tyler, the Creator	
November 16	Chromakopia	Tyler, the Creator	
November 23	The Secret of Us	Gracie Abrams	
November 30	From Zero	Linkin Park	
December 7	GNX	Kendrick Lamar	
December 14	The Tortured Poets Department †	Taylor Swift	
December 21	Christmas	Michael Bublé	
December 28	Christmas	Michael Bublé	

== See also ==
- List of Canadian Hot 100 number-one singles of 2024
