= Tiera Kennedy =

American singer-songwriter

- Born: Tiera Leftwich; July 24, 1998 (age 28); Gardendale, Alabama, U.S.
- Origin: Birmingham, Alabama, U.S.
- Genres: Country; R&B
- Occupations: Singer; songwriter
- Instruments: Vocals; guitar
- Years active: 2015–present
- Labels: Big Machine; Hill; Valory
- Spouse: Kamren Kennedy
- Website: tiera.com

Tiera Kennedy (née Leftwich; born July 24, 1998) is an American country music singer-songwriter. Kennedy is the host of Apple Music Country's The Tiera Show.

== Background ==
A native of Gardendale, Alabama, Kennedy grew up learning how to play the guitar from watching YouTube videos. She grew up singing country music wherever she could, including restaurants like Chick-Fil-A and Buffalo Wild Wings. While in high school, she met a group of bluegrass musicians which furthered her love for country music. Her musical influences growing up included Taylor Swift, Carrie Underwood, Dolly Parton, and Kelsea Ballerini.

Kennedy originally planned to enroll at Belmont University, but instead accepted a full-ride scholarship to University of North Alabama, where she spent one year. During that time, she honed her songwriting skills at FAME Studios and ultimately decided to move to Nashville to pursue a career in music.

== Career ==
In 2018, Kennedy gained national attention after being mentored by Shania Twain on the reality TV show Real Country. Kennedy won her episode, marking the beginning of her rise in the industry. Kennedy made her debut at the Grand Ole Opry in 2021 and was honored to perform at the ACM Honors at the Ryman Auditorium.

In 2022, she signed with Big Machine Music Group and released "Found it In You", a song she had first recorded as a demo years earlier. She followed this with the release of "Alabama Nights", a song reflecting her roots.

Kennedy was named on MusicRow's Next Big Thing in 2022 and was also listed as Pandora's Country Artist to Watch. She opened for artists including Kelsea Ballerini and Danielle Bradbery. In 2023, she released the single "Jesus, My Mama, My Therapist", co-written by Eily Falvey, Trianne Anderson, and Emily Landis.

In 2024, Kennedy was featured on Beyoncé's Cowboy Carter album, performing on "Blackbiird" alongside other Black female country singers. She also provided background vocals on the album track "Tyrant".

After Kennedy parted ways with Big Machine Records, she self-released "I Ain't a Cowgirl" on April 26, 2024. Kennedy's debut studio album, Rooted, was released on October 18, 2024, through her own Green Is My Color imprint. Two further promotional singles – "Cry" and "Can't Help My Country" – were issued ahead of its release, and the album features a collaboration with Jordin Sparks.

== Personal life ==
Kennedy married creative director Kamren Kennedy in 2021 after seven years of dating.

== Discography ==
=== Studio albums ===
List of studio albums, with selected details, chart positions and sales
Title	Album details
Rooted	Release date: October 18, 2024; Label: Green Is My Color; Format: Digital download

=== EPs ===
- Tiera Acoustic EP (2015)
- Tiera (Independent, 2021)

=== Singles ===
- "Jesus, My Mama, My Therapist" (Big Machine Label Group, 2023)
- "I’ll Be Home For Christmas" (Big Machine Label Group, 2022)
- "Blue Christmas" (Big Machine Label Group, 2022)
- "Alabama Nights" (Big Machine Label Group, 2022)
- "Found it In You" (Big Machine Label Group, 2022)
- "Gentlemen" (Big Machine Label Group, 2021)
- "Found It In You" (Independent, 2021)
- "Be Kind" (The Acoustic Room, 2020)

=== Other appearances ===
- "Blackbiird" (Beyoncé - Cowboy Carter, Columbia Records, 2024)
- "Tyrant" (Beyoncé - Cowboy Carter, Columbia Records, 2024)

== Awards and nominations ==
Year	Award	Work	Category	Result	Ref.
2024	People's Choice Country Awards	"Blackbiird" (with Beyoncé, Tanner Adell, Brittney Spencer and Reyna Roberts)	The Collaboration Song of 2024	Nominated	
2024	People's Choice Country Awards	"Blackbiird" (with Beyoncé, Tanner Adell, Brittney Spencer and Reyna Roberts)	The Cover Song of 2024	Nominated	
