= Caro mio ben =

18th-century Italian arietta

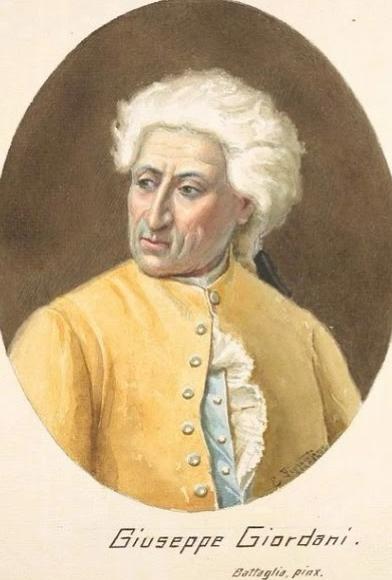
Giuseppe Giordani ("Giordanello"), one of the composers the song has been attributed to

"Caro mio ben" (Italian for "Thou, all my bliss" among others (Note: Alternate translations include "Dearest, Believe", "Dear, My Beloved", "Oh Gentle Maid",)) is an Italian arietta attributed to Tommaso Giordani, and alternatively his father Giuseppe or another, unrelated, Giuseppe Giordani. Written c. 1785 in London, it is a soprano love song.

== Composition ==
"Caro mio ben" was written c. 1785 for a concert in London. The song expresses love to the extent that one's heart feels ill when alone.

"Caro mio ben" is a soprano arietta; however, low-voice versions of the song have been created.

The song starts with a theme which is repeated twice, before moving to the second part, the climax of the song. Lastly, the piece returns to the theme for the conclusion. The song is intended to be sung at a slower tempo, Larghetto. "Caro mio ben", like many similar opera songs of the time, is written in a major key. The second iteration of the theme near the beginning is often reduced, from four phrases to three.

== Attribution and possible composers ==
"Caro mio ben" has been attributed to both Tommaso Giordani, his father Giuseppe, and an unrelated Giuseppe Giordani, nicknamed "Giordanello". The general consensus for centuries was that Giordanello had composed the aria; however, recent research, primarily by John Glenn Paton, has shown that it was likely actually composed by Tommaso.

Giuseppe Giordani (1751–1798), nicknamed "Giordanello", was born in Naples on 19 December 1751. He wrote over 30 operas, but most are largely forgotten. In 1778, Giordani married a famous singer, Emanuela Cosmi. In the 1780s, Giordani focused his career in the north of Italy, and he later became maestro di cappella at Fermo Cathedral. His largest success was the oratorio La distruzione di Gerusalemme, which is believed to be the first ever sacred drama, a theatrical rendition of parts of the Bible, to be presented in a theatre. This oratorio was received well by the local press and was even acclaimed by Johann Wolfgang von Goethe. Giordani died in Fermo on 4 January 1798 at the age of 47.

Tomasso Giordani (c. 1733–1806) was born in Naples into a family of musicians and dancers. After touring Europe in the 1740s and receiving a music education, he composed his first work, a comic opera, in 1756. In 1764, Giordani visited Ireland for the first time, living in Dublin for three years and continuing his career in music composition. In 1766, his opera "L'eroe cinese" was staged at Crow Street Theatre in Dublin, and is thought to be the first opera seria performed in Ireland. After being accused of plagiarism, Giordani returned to London where he remained for the next 16 years. He returned to Ireland in 1783 but came back to England in 1784 after his opera company went bankrupt. In October of that year, he made a deal with his creditors, allowing him to return to Dublin. Giordani then married a daughter of Tate Wilkinson, the manager of Crow St. Theatre, and in 1787 he became the musical director of the theatre. His last work was The Cottage Festival, or A Day in Wales, with barrister Leonard MacNally as his librettist. Giordani has been the subject of many accusations of plagiarism. He died in Dublin in February 1806 at the age of 73.

== Lyrics ==
Original Italian
Caro mio ben, credimi almen
Senza di te languisce il cor
Il tuo fedel sospira ognor
Cessa crudel, tanto rigor
Caro mio ben credimi almen
Senza di te languisce il cor.

Literal translation
Dear my beloved, believe me at last
Without you languishes my heart
Your faithful one sighs always
Cease, cruel one, so much severity
Dear my beloved, believe me at last
Without you languishes my heart.

Poetic translation
Thou, all my bliss, believe but this
When thou art far, my heart is lorn
Thy lover true ever doth sigh
Do but forgo such cruel scorn
Thou, all my bliss, believe but this
When thou art far my heart is lorn

== Legacy ==
"Caro mio ben" became well known in the late 18th century thanks to the singing of Gaspare Pacchierotti, a castrato and male soprano.

"Caro mio ben" was featured in 1984 film Amadeus, a movie based on a fictional rivalry between Wolfgang Amadeus Mozart and Antonio Salieri.

"Caro mio ben" is popular among vocal students for expanding their range and practising their vocal technique.

In her 2024 album Cowboy Carter, Beyoncé included a short excerpt of "Caro mio ben" in her song "Daughter". In this song, she transposes the excerpt into a minor key and uses it as a bridge.

Radclyffe Hall references "Caro mio ben" in her 1925 book A Saturday Life. Harry Collingwood also references the song in his 1907 book With Airship and Submarine. Franklin Hamilton mentions the song in his 1911 novel Robert Kimberly.
