= List of UK Country Albums Chart number ones of 2024 =

These are the Official Charts Company's UK Country Albums Chart number ones of 2024. The chart week runs from Friday to Thursday with the chart-date given as the following Thursday. Chart positions are based the multi-metric consumption of country music in the United Kingdom, blending traditional album sales, track equivalent albums, and streaming equivalent albums. The chart contains 20 positions.

In the iteration of the chart dated 5 January, Taylor Swift's re-recording of her 2008 album Fearless spent its 37th non-consecutive week at number one, and remained in the top spot for the first four weeks of the year, before being displaced by Sarah Jarosz's seventh album Polaroid Lovers. Swift then returned to number one for one week, and was followed by Chains & Stakes by The Dead South, which spent two consecutive weeks at number one. Kacey Musgraves' Deeper Well also spent two consecutive weeks at number one after premiering on the chart on 22 March. Immediately following its release, Cowboy Carter by Beyoncé debuted in the top spot on 5 April and became the first album by an African American woman to reach number one on the UK Country Albums Chart, remaining at number one for eleven consecutive weeks before eventually being overtaken by Luke Combs' fifth album Fathers & Sons and then Songwriter, the fifth posthumous album by Johnny Cash and his seventh UK number one overall. Swift then reclaimed the top spot for another two weeks before Orville Peck and Post Malone topped the charts for two weeks each with Stampede and F-1 Trillion respectively. Malone would return to number one for an additional three weeks throughout the rest of the year, separated by multi-week chart toppers by Jelly Roll and Kelsea Ballerini, and Willie Nelson's 76th album Last Leaf on the Tree, his seventh UK number one. Swift returned to and held the top spot for the final three weeks of the 2024.

== Chart history ==
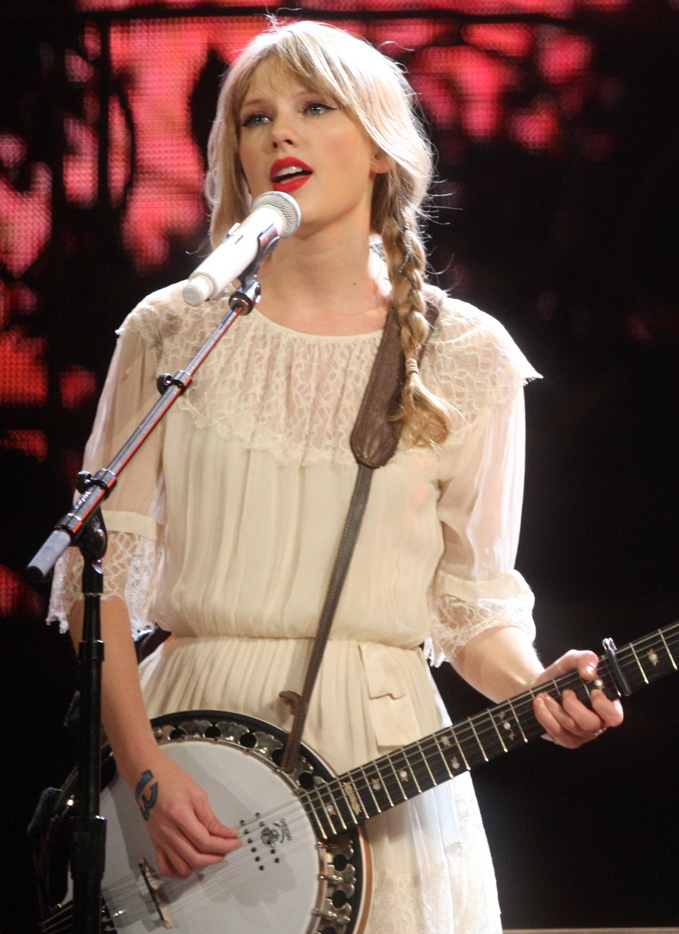
Fearless by Taylor Swift was the first number-one album of the year, and spent 15 weeks at number one in 2024.

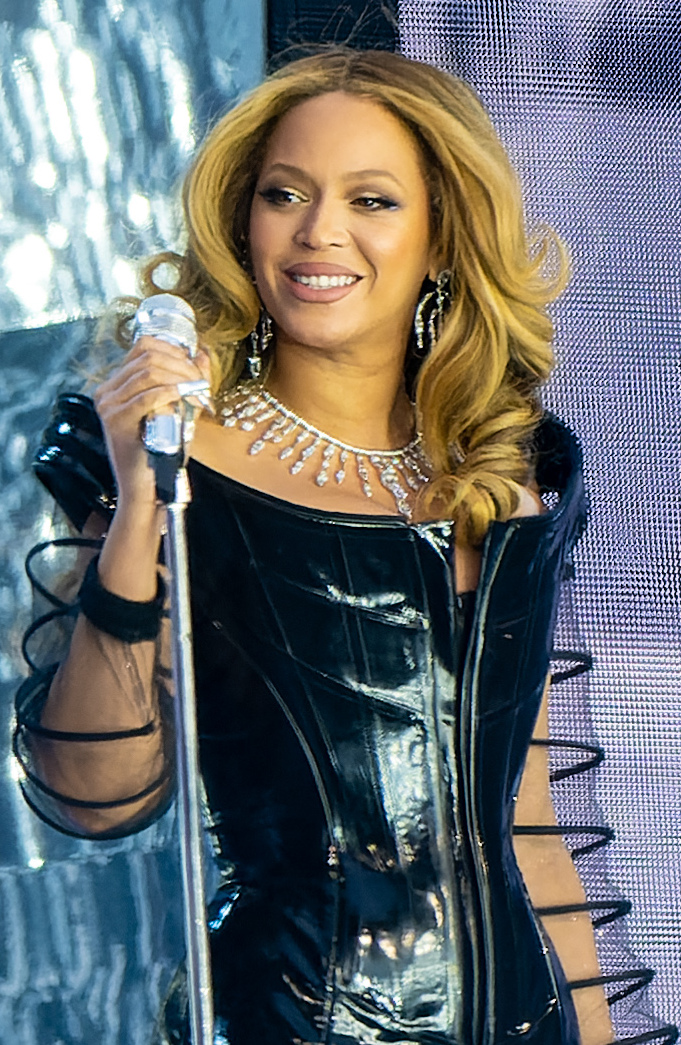
In April, Beyoncé became the first female African-American artist ever to achieve a number-one country album in the UK, with her Cowboy Carter album spending 11 consecutive weeks at the top spot to date.

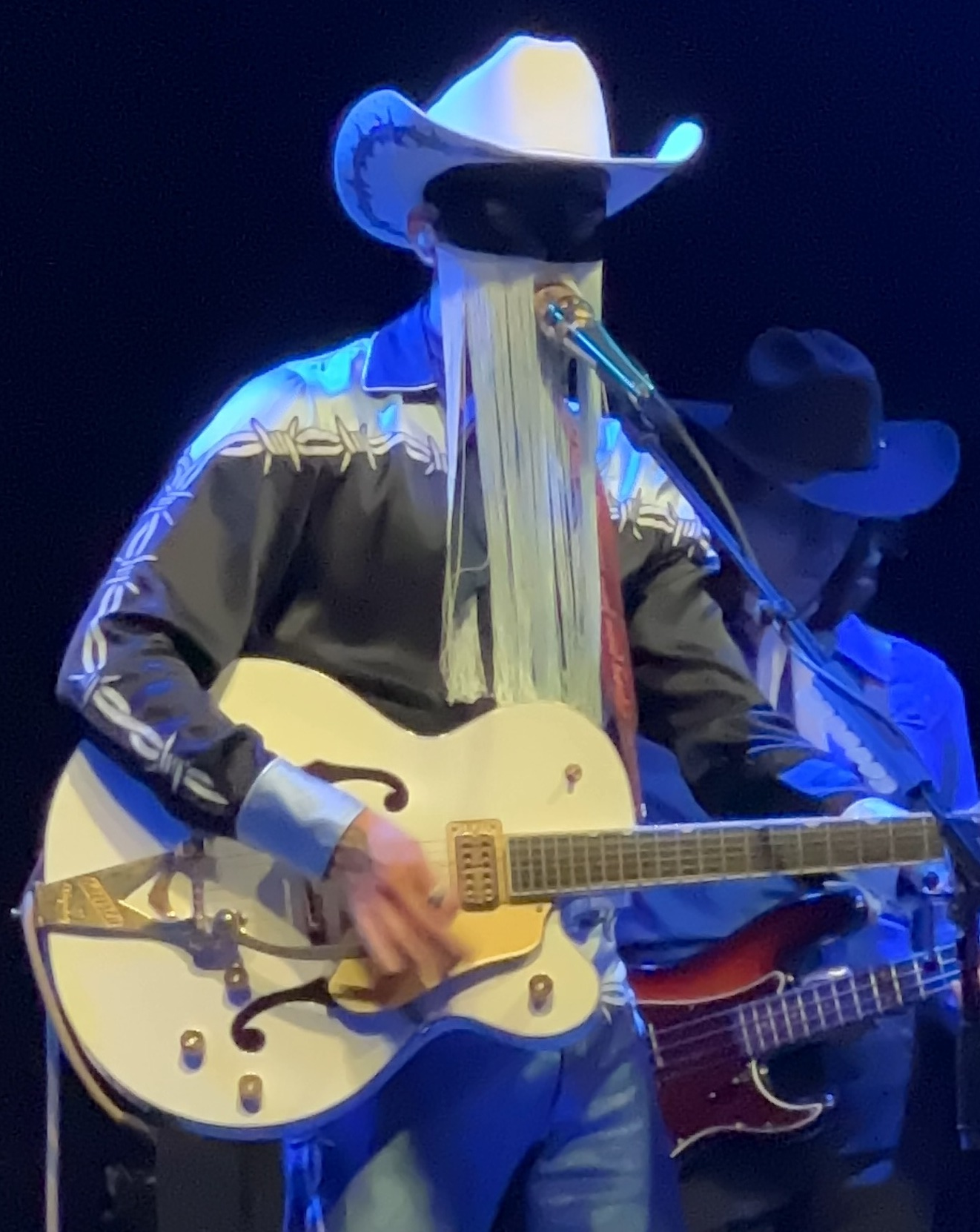
Orville Peck earned his first UK number one album with his collaborative project Stampede.

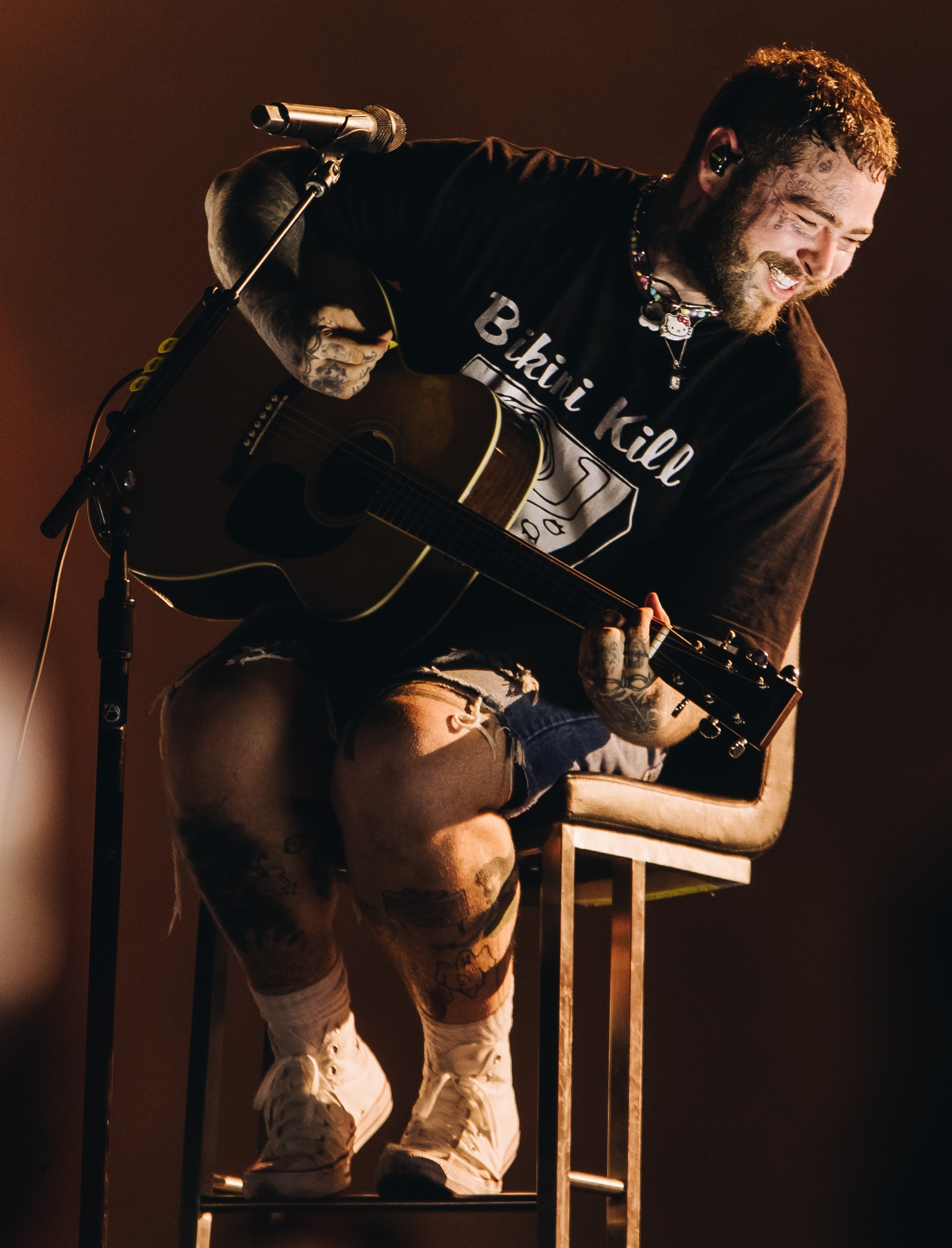
Post Malone spent five weeks at number one with his debut country release F-1 Trillion.

Issue date	Album	Artist(s)	Record label	Ref.
5 January	Fearless (Taylor's Version)	Taylor Swift	EMI	
12 January	Fearless (Taylor's Version)	Taylor Swift	EMI	
19 January	Fearless (Taylor's Version)	Taylor Swift	EMI	
26 January	Fearless (Taylor's Version)	Taylor Swift	EMI	
2 February	Polaroid Lovers	Sarah Jarosz	Rounder	
9 February	Fearless (Taylor's Version)	Taylor Swift	EMI	
16 February	Chains & Stakes	The Dead South	Six Shooter	
23 February	Chains & Stakes	The Dead South	Six Shooter	
1 March	Fearless (Taylor's Version)	Taylor Swift	EMI	
8 March	Fearless (Taylor's Version)	Taylor Swift	EMI	
15 March	Fearless (Taylor's Version)	Taylor Swift	EMI	
22 March	Deeper Well	Kacey Musgraves	Interscope	
29 March	Deeper Well	Kacey Musgraves	Interscope	
5 April	Cowboy Carter	Beyoncé	Columbia/Parkwood Ent.	
12 April	Cowboy Carter	Beyoncé	Columbia/Parkwood Ent.	
19 April	Cowboy Carter	Beyoncé	Columbia/Parkwood Ent.	
26 April	Cowboy Carter	Beyoncé	Columbia/Parkwood Ent.	
3 May	Cowboy Carter	Beyoncé	Columbia/Parkwood Ent.	
10 May	Cowboy Carter	Beyoncé	Columbia/Parkwood Ent.	
17 May	Cowboy Carter	Beyoncé	Columbia/Parkwood Ent.	
24 May	Cowboy Carter	Beyoncé	Columbia/Parkwood Ent.	
31 May	Cowboy Carter	Beyoncé	Columbia/Parkwood Ent.	
7 June	Cowboy Carter	Beyoncé	Columbia/Parkwood Ent.	
14 June	Cowboy Carter	Beyoncé	Columbia/Parkwood Ent.	
21 June	Fathers & Sons	Luke Combs	Sony	
28 June	Fathers & Sons	Luke Combs	Sony	
5 July	Songwriter	Johnny Cash	EMI	
12 July	Songwriter	Johnny Cash	EMI	
19 July	Songwriter	Johnny Cash	EMI	
26 July	Fearless (Taylor's Version)	Taylor Swift	EMI	
2 August	Fearless (Taylor's Version)	Taylor Swift	EMI	
9 August	Stampede	Orville Peck	Warner Records	
16 August	Stampede	Orville Peck	Warner Records	
23 August	F-1 Trillion	Post Malone	Republic	
30 August	F-1 Trillion	Post Malone	Republic	
6 September	Whirlwind	Lainey Wilson	Broken Bow	
13 September	F-1 Trillion	Post Malone	Republic	
20 September	F-1 Trillion	Post Malone	Republic	
27 September	Long Shot Love	Derek Ryan	Sharpe Music	
4 October	Long Shot Love	Derek Ryan	Sharpe Music	
11 October	F-1 Trillion	Post Malone	Republic	
18 October	Beautifully Broken	Jelly Roll	EMI	
25 October	Beautifully Broken	Jelly Roll	EMI	
1 November	Patterns	Kelsea Ballerini	Black River	
8 November	Patterns	Kelsea Ballerini	Black River	
15 November	Last Leaf on the Tree	Willie Nelson	Sony	
22 November	Fearless (Taylor's Version)	Taylor Swift	EMI	
29 November	Fearless (Taylor's Version)	Taylor Swift	EMI	
6 December	The Great American Bar Scene	Zach Bryan	Warner	
13 December	Fearless (Taylor's Version)	Taylor Swift	EMI	
20 December	Fearless (Taylor's Version)	Taylor Swift	EMI	
27 December	Fearless (Taylor's Version)	Taylor Swift	EMI	

== Most weeks at number one ==
Weeks at number one	Artist
15	Taylor Swift
11	Beyoncé
5	Post Malone
3	Johnny Cash
2	The Dead South
2	Derek Ryan
2	Jelly Roll
2	Kacey Musgraves
2	Kelsea Ballerini
2	Luke Combs
2	Orville Peck

== See also ==
- List of UK Albums Chart number ones of 2024
- List of UK Dance Singles Chart number ones of 2024
- List of UK Album Downloads Chart number ones of 2024
- List of UK Independent Albums Chart number ones of 2024
- List of UK R&B Albums Chart number ones of 2024
- List of UK Rock & Metal Albums Chart number ones of 2024
- List of UK Compilation Chart number ones of the 2020s
