= Cowboy Carter =

2024 studio album by Beyoncé

- Standard cover

Studio album by Beyoncé
- Released: March 29, 2024
- Recorded: 2011 (Note: Recording engineer DJ Swivel confirmed that the song "Ya Ya" (formerly titled Ya Ya Ya) was initially recorded during the 4 sessions.); c. 2019–2024
- Studios: APG; Dezert Flower; Electric Feel; Kings Landing West; Parkwood West; Record Plant; The Sound Factory; The Village; Westlake Recording (Los Angeles); The Cave; East Iris; The Library (Nashville); The Trailer (East Hampton, New York); Dolly P's Studio
- Genres: Country; country pop; outlaw country; pop; Americana; western; country-soul; blues; hip-hop; R&B
- Length: 78:21
- Languages: English; Italian
- Labels: Parkwood; Columbia
- Producers: 070 Shake; BAH; Jon Batiste; Beyoncé; Cadenza; Cam; Miley Cyrus; D.A. Got That Dope; Derek Dixie; Dixson; Ian Fitchuk; Harry Edwards; Shawn Everett; Nathan Ferraro; Ink; Tyler Johnson; Paul McCartney; No I.D.; Nova Wav; Dave Hamelin; Killah B; Nick Kobe; Mamii; Simon Mårtensson; Pharrell Williams; Jack Ro; Raphael Saadiq; Sean Solymar; Sounwave; Swizz Beatz; The-Dream; Khirye Tyler

Beyoncé chronology
Renaissance (2022)	Cowboy Carter (2024)

Singles from Cowboy Carter
- 1. "Texas Hold 'Em / 16 Carriages" Released: February 11, 2024; 2. "II Most Wanted" Released: April 15, 2024

Cowboy Carter (stylized in all caps; also referred to as Act II: Cowboy Carter) is the eighth studio album by American singer and songwriter Beyoncé. It was released on March 29, 2024, by Parkwood Entertainment and Columbia Records. A concept album, Cowboy Carter is the second of a planned trilogy of albums, following Renaissance (2022). Beyoncé conceived the album as a journey through a reinvention of Americana, spotlighting the overlooked contributions of Black pioneers to American musical and cultural history.

A genre-blending album rooted in country music, Cowboy Carter is influenced by Beyoncé's upbringing in Texas, incorporating eclectic styles of music of the Southern United States. Conceptually, the album is presented as a radio broadcast, with country singers Dolly Parton, Linda Martell, and Willie Nelson acting as disc jockeys. The album's songs feature rising Black country artists such as Shaboozey, Tanner Adell, Brittney Spencer, Tiera Kennedy, Reyna Roberts, and Willie Jones. The music is driven by a range of acoustic instruments played by musicians including Stevie Wonder, Paul McCartney, and Nile Rodgers, among others.

Cowboy Carter was met with universal acclaim and appeared on multiple year-end lists; critics stated that the album's genre experimentation, expansive scope and eclectic references aided an ambitious reimagining of Americana and country through the lens of their Black roots. At the 67th Grammy Awards, Beyoncé became the first Black woman in 25 years to win Album of the Year and the first Black artist to win Best Country Album; the album's third single, "II Most Wanted", won Best Country Duo/Group Performance. The album increased the listenership of country music, drove cultural conversations on Black musicians' place within the genre, boosted the careers of rising country artists, and increased the popularity of Western wear and culture.

Cowboy Carter debuted at number one in several countries and broke multiple chart and streaming records. In the United States, it topped the Billboard 200 and was Beyoncé's first to top the Top Country Albums chart, selling 407,000 album-equivalent units. The album was supported by three singles, "Texas Hold 'Em", "16 Carriages", and "II Most Wanted", with the first becoming Beyoncé's ninth US number-one single and the first country song by a Black woman to top the Billboard Hot 100 and Hot Country Songs charts. To support the album, Beyoncé embarked on the Cowboy Carter Tour from April 28 to July 26, 2025.

== Background and development ==
Beyoncé was born and raised in Houston, where the city's cowboy heritage and country and zydeco music played a role in her upbringing. She listened to country music from an early age, particularly from her paternal grandfather, and her family attended the Houston Livestock Show and Rodeo every year in western clothing. She performed at the Rodeo four times between 2001 and 2007, and has continued to celebrate her country and Southern roots throughout her career. (Note: Supported by multiple sources:)

I grew up going to the Houston rodeo every year. It was this amazing, diverse and multicultural experience where there was something for every member of the family, including great performances, Houston-style fried Snickers, and fried turkey legs. One of my inspirations came from the overlooked history of the American Black cowboy. Many of them were originally called cowhands, who experienced great discrimination and were often forced to work with the worst, most temperamental horses. They took their talents and formed the Soul Circuit. Through time, these Black rodeos showcased incredible performers and helped us reclaim our place in western history and culture.

— Beyoncé to Harper's Bazaar in 2021

Beyoncé first released an original country song in 2016: the track "Daddy Lessons" on her sixth studio album, Lemonade. Beyoncé, together with the Chicks (who had previously covered the song), performed the track at the 50th Annual Country Music Association Awards on November 2, 2016. The performance was largely praised by critics and gave the Country Music Association Awards their highest viewership in history; however, it was also met with backlash, with some country music fans criticizing Beyoncé's attendance and claiming she did not belong in the genre. The Country Music Association deleted all promotional posts about Beyoncé's performance, which was seen by some observers as succumbing to the pressure from conservative and racist viewers. In December 2016, The Recording Academy's country music committee rejected "Daddy Lessons" for consideration for a Grammy Award, with publications reporting that the song was not seen as being "country enough".

This experience led to the creation of Cowboy Carter. Beyoncé explained how it was made clear to her that she was not welcome in the country music space, which encouraged her to explore the musical history of the genre rather than letting the critics force her out of it. She delved into the history of country music and Western culture and researched its African-American roots. She studied "our rich musical archive" and learned from educators who had long advocated for a re-education on the Black roots of country music. She also read that, historically, half of cowboys were Black, which made her realize how much of the Black, brown, and Native cowboy stories are missing in American history. This was the inspiration for her 2021 "Ivy Park Rodeo" clothing collection. Following this research, Beyoncé conceived Cowboy Carter as a journey through a reinvention of Americana, in which she redefines its boundaries and spotlights overlooked contributions of African Americans to diverse musical genres, Southern and Western culture, and American history. Collaborator Rhiannon Giddens said Beyoncé did not intend to create a typical crossover country album, but instead wanted to explore her family's roots through music.

Cowboy Carter was over five years in the making. Beyoncé began to write the album in 2019, then recorded during the COVID-19 pandemic, which she described as her most creative period. The album forms "Act II" of a trilogy project that Beyoncé recorded during this period. The first act, Renaissance (2022), is primarily a house and disco record highlighting and celebrating the Black progenitors of dance music, leading some to believe that each album of the trilogy would aim to explore the Black roots of a different musical genre. Cowboy Carter was originally intended to be released before Renaissance, but Beyoncé changed the order in response to the pandemic. Between 2020 and 2024, Dolly Parton often said that she would like Beyoncé to cover her song "Jolene".

While working on the album, she reached out to Miley Cyrus to collaborate with her on Cowboy Carter. Cyrus presented her with "Easy Lover" and "Shotgun Rider", and Beyoncé chose the latter, renaming it "II Most Wanted".

== Composition ==
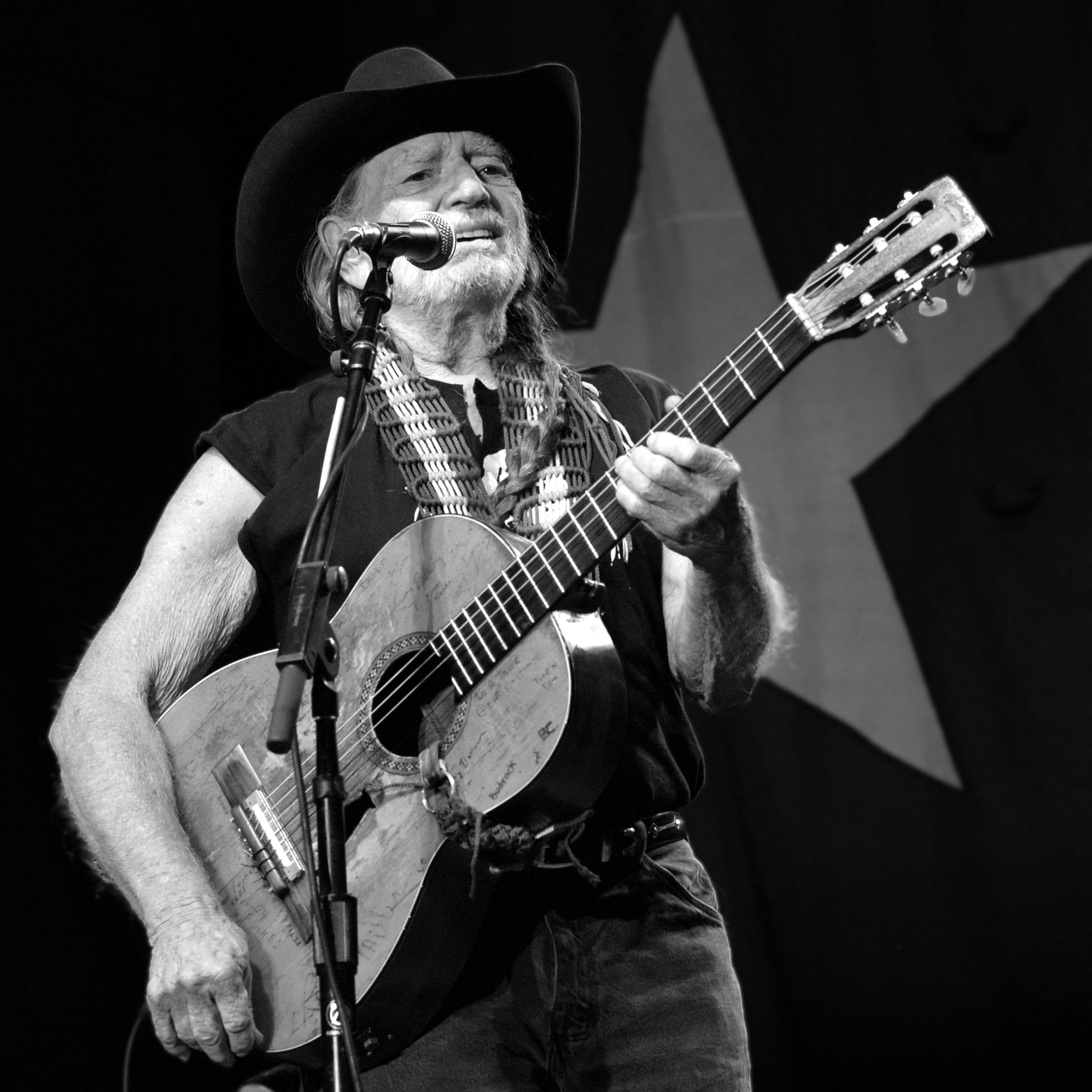
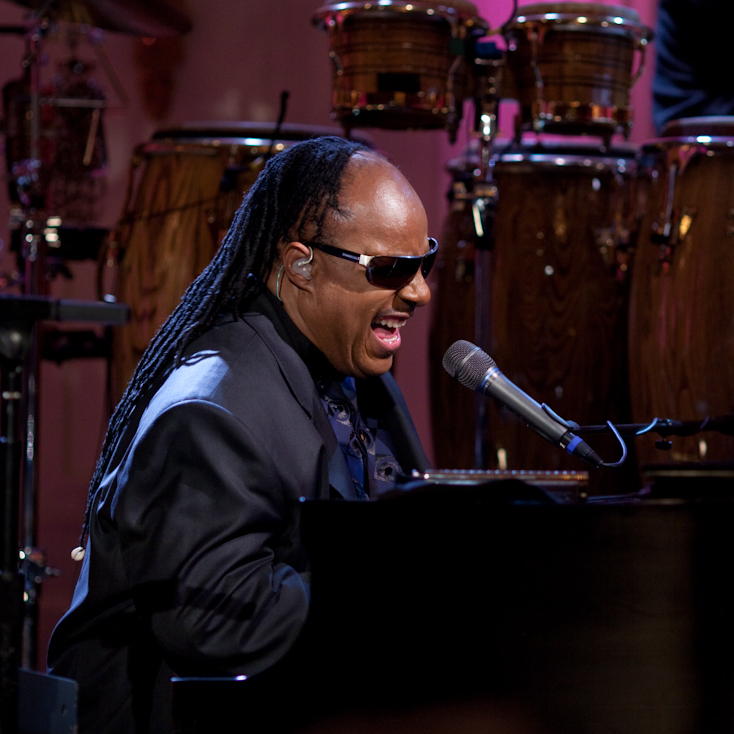
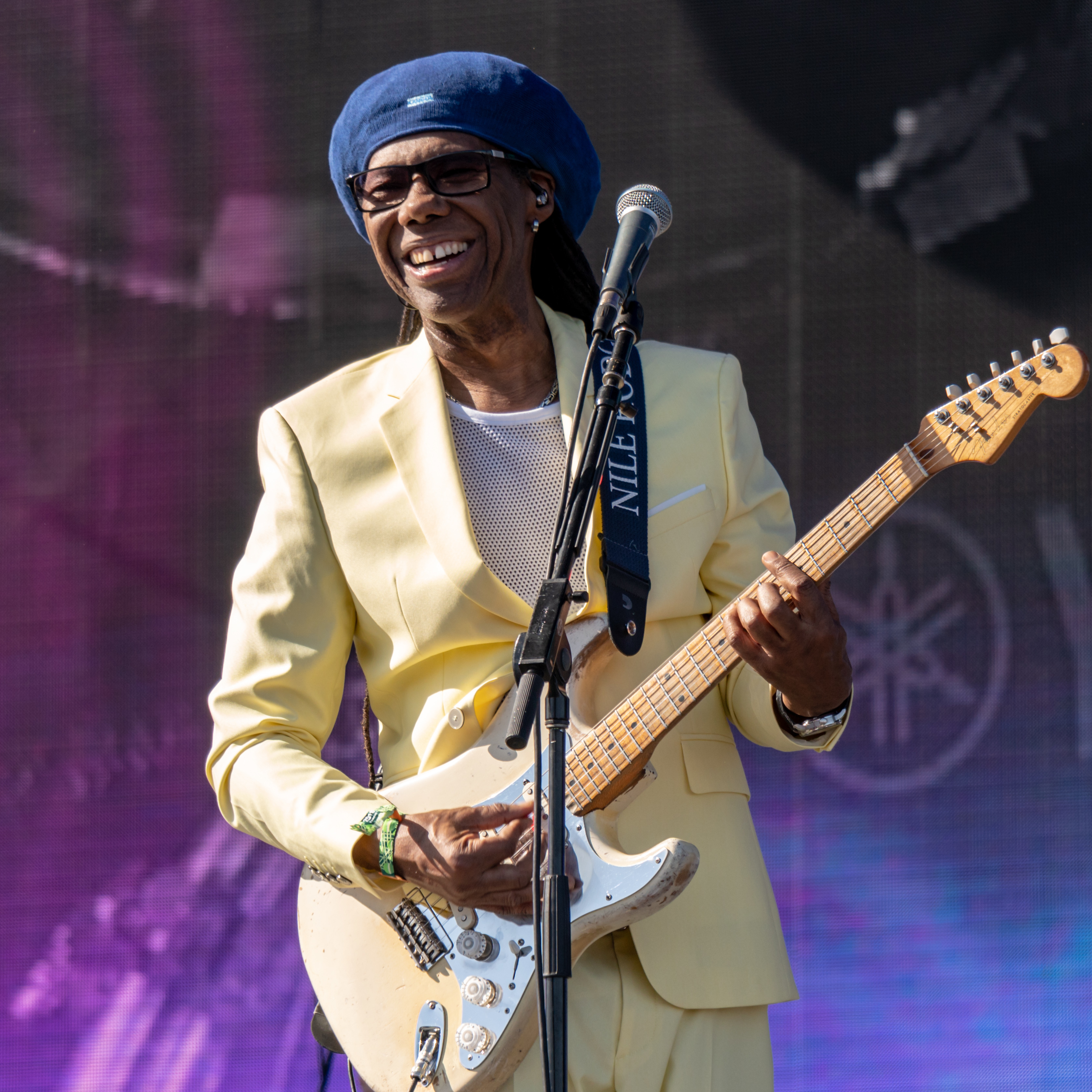
In addition to up-and-coming country artists, various established musicians contributed to Cowboy Carter, including Willie Nelson, Stevie Wonder and Nile Rodgers.

The joy of creating music is that there are no rules. The more I see the world evolving the more I felt a deeper connection to purity. With artificial intelligence and digital filters and programming, I wanted to go back to real instruments, and I used very old ones. I didn't want some layers of instruments like strings, especially guitars, and organs perfectly in tune. I kept some songs raw and leaned into folk. All the sounds were so organic and human, everyday things like the wind, snaps and even the sound of birds and chickens, the sounds of nature.

— Beyoncé on Cowboy Carter

Beyoncé recorded around 100 songs for the album. Each song is its own reimagined version of a Western film, including Five Fingers for Marseilles (2017), Urban Cowboy (1980), The Hateful Eight (2015), Space Cowboys (2000), The Harder They Fall (2021), Killers of the Flower Moon (2023), Thelma & Louise (1991) and O Brother, Where Art Thou? (2000).

Rooted in country music, Cowboy Carter is a genre-spanning album that blends various styles of American roots music, in particular that of the American South. Publications categorized it as country pop, country, outlaw country, pop, western, country-soul, blues, hip-hop, R&B, and Americana, It further explores elements of folk, and various other styles that Beyoncé listened to when growing up in Texas, including zydeco, rock and roll, psychedelic soul, rhythm and blues, funk, gospel, bluegrass, opera, Southern hip-hop, rock, honky-tonk, and go-go. The album also fuses in more contemporary and international musical styles, such as house, Jersey club, flamenco, funk carioca, fado and Irish folk. Beyoncé's experimentation with musical styles on Cowboy Carter aims to break down the limitations placed on genre-based music, in the service of redefining the boundaries of Americana. The album's genre experimentation received significant discussion in the media, with publications describing the album as "genre-busting", "genre-defying", "genre-bending" and "genre-blending". Music critics differed in their classification of the album: some simply defined it as "country" or "country-and-Western", while others opined that the album is not a country album per se but uses country signifiers to explore various genres. Beyoncé herself said about Cowboy Carter: "This ain't a Country album. This is a 'Beyoncé' album." USA Today's Kofi Mframa said this description was a "resounding testament to Beyoncé's long history of refusal to adhere to the traditional confines of genre".

The album is presented as a broadcast by a fictional Texas radio station, with country singers Dolly Parton, Linda Martell and Willie Nelson acting as radio DJs. The album features rising country artists Tanner Adell, Brittney Spencer, Tiera Kennedy, Reyna Roberts, Shaboozey and Willie Jones. The album is cyclical, with the final note looping seamlessly into the beginning of the first track (which begins "Nothing really ends") in the same manner as James Joyce's Finnegans Wake (1939), according to The Washington Post's Shane O'Neill. The album features a range of acoustic instruments played by musicians including Stevie Wonder on harmonica, Paul McCartney and Nile Rodgers on guitar, and Rhiannon Giddens on banjo.

== Promotion and release ==
=== Lead singles ===
On February 11, 2024, during Super Bowl LVIII, Verizon aired a commercial starring Beyoncé entitled "Can't B Broken", in which she tried to "break the Internet" through increasingly outlandish means, such as releasing a jazz saxophone record, performing on top of Sphere in Las Vegas, building an artificial intelligence (AI) version of herself, launching a collection of Barbie-like dolls dubbed "BarBey", announcing her candidacy for a fictional political position, and flying into space for a performance. After all of the ideas proved unsuccessful, Beyoncé concluded the commercial by remarking: "Okay, they ready. Drop the new music".

After the commercial aired, Beyoncé released a teaser video for Act II on Instagram. Directed by British artist and filmmaker Nadia Lee Cohen, the video pays homage to Paris, Texas (1984), references border blasters and features Chuck Berry's 1955 track "Maybellene". The same day, the singer's official website was updated to announce her eighth studio album, with the placeholder name Act II, scheduled for release on March 29. Subsequently, the album's two lead singles, "Texas Hold 'Em" and "16 Carriages", were simultaneously made available for digital download and streaming. On March 12, Beyoncé announced the album would be titled Cowboy Carter via a teaser poster of a western saddle with a sash. She also listed album merchandise, including limited-edition CDs with a bonus track, T-shirts, and vinyl variants in red, white, blue, and standard black.

=== Album release ===
On March 19, 2024, Beyoncé revealed the album cover via Instagram, and said there would be "surprises" and collaborations on the album. On March 20, she revealed a limited edition exclusive cover, wearing a sash that reads "act ii BEYINCÉ", referencing the generational family surname of her mother, Tina Knowles. Taglines and film stills for the album were projected onto various museums in New York City. One was an unauthorized projection onto the Solomon R. Guggenheim Museum, which responded good-naturedly by posting Franz Marc's 1910 painting Three Horses Drinking with the caption "This ain't Texas" in reference to "Texas Hold 'Em". Beyoncé also posted co-ordinates to the museum on her Instagram story.

This album has been over five years in the making. [...] It feels good to see how music can unite so many people around the world, while also amplifying the voices of some of the people who have dedicated so much of their lives educating on our musical history. The criticisms I faced when I first entered this genre forced me to propel past the limitations that were put on me. act ii is a result of challenging myself, and taking my time to bend and blend genres together to create this body of work. [...] I hope that you can hear my heart and soul, and all the love and passion that I poured into every detail and every sound. I focused on this album as a continuation of RENAISSANCE...I hope this music is an experience, creating another journey where you can close your eyes, start from the beginning and never stop. This ain't a Country album. This is a "Beyoncé" album.

— Beyoncé via Instagram in March 2024

On March 27, Beyoncé posted a graphic to Instagram of the album's tracklist inspired by vintage posters from the Chitlin' Circuit era. It revealed collaborations with Dolly Parton and Willie Nelson, as well as a cover of Parton's "Jolene" and the song "The Linda Martell Show". The latter song references Linda Martell, the first Black woman to achieve commercial success in the country genre.

The CD release was issued in four variants, each with a different rear cover depicting Beyoncé. It was released in Japan on March 29 and on April 12 in Europe. After the album's release, fans reported that their pre-ordered physical vinyl and CD copies were missing numerous tracks, with some asking for refunds.

=== Levi's campaign ===
The American clothing company Levi Strauss & Co. saw an opportunity to better market their brand to a female audience after their product inspired the Cowboy Carter track "Levii's Jeans". On September 30, 2024, the brand announced a global campaign with Beyoncé titled "Reiimagine" that stretched to August 2025. It was based on women's history with the brand and split into four reimagined historical Levi's commercials as "chapters", the first being of the company's 1985 "Laundrette" television spot, the second being 1991's "Pool Hall," the third being 1988's "Refrigerator" and the fourth being a compilation of all three entitled "The Denim Cowboy." It renamed the chapters to "The Ice", "The Heat", and "The Smoke", and had additional footage of Beyoncé entering "Laundrette" on a horse and exiting "Pool Hall" on a motorcycle.

Levi's described the partnership as "the biggest one [they've] ever done," and used Beyoncé's impact to help boost sales to $2 billion. The first commercial starring Beyoncé amassed 2.4 billion impressions in under a month. As of August 2025, three of the looks featured in the second "chapter" rank as Levi's top sellers in Europe.

=== Live performances ===
On November 17, 2024, it was revealed that Beyoncé would perform a Cowboy Carter medley as a halftime show of the National Football League (NFL) match game between the Houston Texans and the Baltimore Ravens during Christmas Day, with the event being available on Netflix. After the broadcast performance, Beyoncé tweeted a short video clip with the caption "Look at that horse" and a stated date for January 14, 2025, within the visualizer, which led to speculations about a promotional concert tour for the album. Nevertheless, the Cowboy Carter Tour was officially announced on the late night of February 1, 2025, while 22 initial dates across the US, England and France were revealed on February 2.

== Cover artwork and title ==
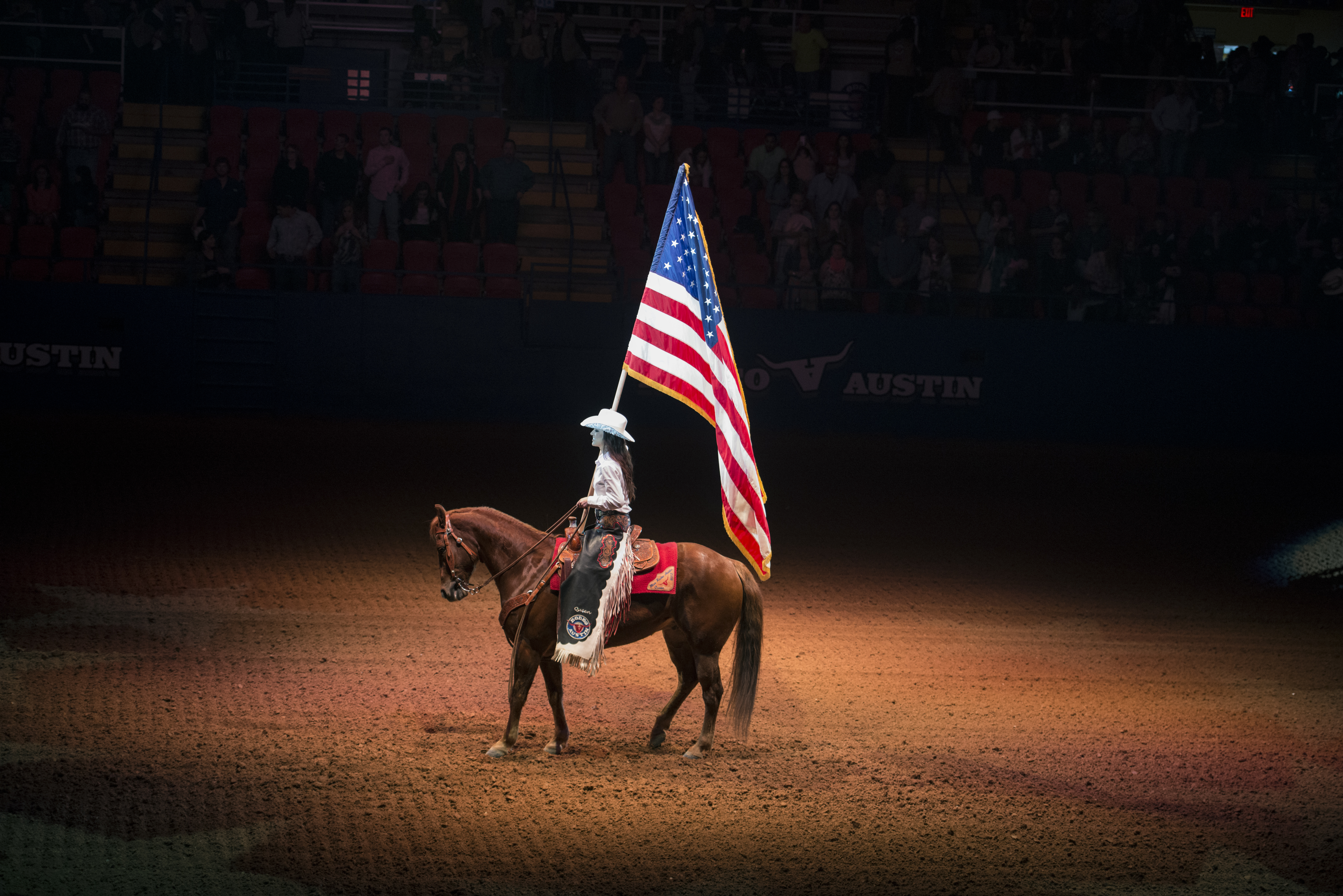
A horsewoman presenting the American flag at a Texas rodeo

The Cowboy Carter album cover was shot by Blair Caldwell, a Los Angeles-based photographer who is from Texas. Much like the cover for Renaissance—which saw Beyoncé sitting atop a stationary disco ball horse—the Cowboy Carter artwork sees Beyoncé atop a gray horse at a gallop. She rides the horse while sitting sideways (historically, sidesaddle riding was associated with high-status women), dressed in red, white and blue clothing, wearing a cowboy hat and a sash reading "Cowboy Carter". She holds the horse's reins in one hand and a large American flag in the other. The imagery is reminiscent of rodeo queens, who often are asked to carry the American flag in a rodeo grand entry.

The album cover was a topic of discussion and dissection by critics. Francesca T Royster, professor at DePaul University and author of Black Country Music: Listening for Revolutions, wrote: "The aesthetic choice is bold and seems to be signaling the ways that Beyoncé is putting herself into conversations about nationalism, a theme very much central to discourses about country music, patriotism and authenticity, from the times of its origins." Critics suggested a variety of inspirations and allusions for the cover, including presidential portraits, Jacques-Louis David's Napoleon Crossing the Alps (1801–1805), Marina Abramović's The Hero (2001), Kehinde Wiley's Equestrian Portrait of King Philip II (Michael Jackson) (2009), the Bill Pickett Invitational Rodeo, and Eadweard Muybridge's The Horse in Motion (1878).

The album is titled after a character "Cowboy Carter", who is inspired by the original Black cowboys of the American West. Beyoncé explained: "The word cowboy itself was used in a derogatory way to describe the former slaves as 'boys', who were the most skilled and had the hardest jobs of handling horses and cattle, alike. In destroying the negative connotation, what remains is the strength and resiliency of these men who were the true definition of Western fortitude."

== Critical reception ==
Professional ratings
Aggregate scores
Source	Rating
AnyDecentMusic?	8.4/10
Metacritic	91/100
Review scores
Source	Rating
AllMusic	4/5 stars
And It Don't Stop	A
Clash	9/10
The Daily Telegraph	5/5 stars
The Independent	5/5 stars
NME	5/5 stars
The Observer	5/5 stars
Pitchfork	8.4/10
Rolling Stone	5/5 stars
Slant Magazine	4.5/5 stars

Cowboy Carter was met with critical acclaim upon release, with some describing it as a "masterpiece". (Note: Supported by multiple sources:) Critics praised Beyoncé's blending of diverse musical genres and vocal performance, and described the album as both a grand political statement and a personal ode to Beyoncé's roots. On the review aggregator website Metacritic, the album received a weighted average score of 91 from 100 based on 22 reviews, indicating "universal acclaim".

Critics lauded Cowboy Carter as an exploration and reinvention of Americana, as well as a celebration of Black southern culture and its contribution to the country music genre. The Atlantic's Spencer Kornhaber and the Evening Standard's Gemma Samways noted that the album experiments with the touchstones and musical traditions of country and Americana in order to explore its Black cultural roots. Maria Sherman of the Associated Press wrote that the "eclectic" and "epic" album "redefines American style" and requires close examination of its references, themes and messages for full enjoyment. HipHopDX's Tai Saint-Louis described the album as a reclamation of both the "deep roots from which Beyoncé has crafted her artistry" and "the many branches that have sprouted from Black music in America". Variety's chief music critic Chris Willman characterized the album as a "piece of agitprop and socially significant performance art" that both reflects and impacts the history of Black music and country.

Critics commended the album for what they described as its ambitious experimentation with genres, with Beyoncé reimagining country music in her image. (Note: Supported by multiple sources:) Neil McCormick of The Daily Telegraph felt the album pushed the boundaries of genres and mixed diverse musical styles as a polemic against the conservatism of the country genre. Clash and Billboard characterized the album as an ethnomusicological study that venerates the breadth of musical subcultures of the American South, while The New York Times critic Ben Sisario described the album as a "broad essay" both on popular music and on genre as a concept. The Independent's Helen Brown and The Sydney Morning Herald's Robert Moran opined that Beyoncé's genre experimentation is in the service of celebrating the overlooked pioneers of country music while spotlighting up-and-coming Black musicians. Robert Christgau said that, while the quality of the songwriting diminishes slightly toward the end, Cowboy Carter's confident and "impressive variety" shows Beyoncé to be "our greatest female pop singer", as well as a "pretty darn good songwriter", with a considerable stake in the country sphere.

Many critics praised the album's "ambitious" scope and "cinematic" grandiosity, likening it to a Western epic. (Note: Supported by multiple sources:) The Financial Times's Ludovic Hunter-Tilney compared the album to a blockbuster historical epic, with its "impressive, very American aura of importance" and "the sense that history is not only being told but also made". NPR's Sidney Madden equated each of the tracks to a "full-length film full of scenic grandeur, character and conflicts" that can be dissected and discussed. Sisario opined that the album in its entirety works as film, writing that Cowboy Carter is the central character in a narrative about tackling American cultural history. Writing for the roots music journal No Depression, John Amen commented, "While 2022's Renaissance spotlighted [Beyoncé] as a global MC throwing the party of the decade, Cowboy Carter, framed as Renaissance's Act II, paints her as a torchbearer and synthesist, an auteur equally adept at playing the archivist and the cultural midwife". Some critics felt that the album would fare better if it were split by musical style. Alexis Petridis of The Guardian wrote that while the album may have worked better as a double-disc, "its wild lurches into eclecticism are the point" and demonstrates Beyoncé's "impressive" ability to "bend musical styles to her will".

=== Year-end rankings ===
Cowboy Carter appeared on several publications' rankings of the best albums of 2024, including number-one features on Business Insider, Esquire, the Houston Chronicle, People and USA Today. It was placed second by Billboard, Entertainment Weekly, PopMatters, The Daily Telegraph and Rolling Stone, and within the top ten by The A.V. Club, Complex, Consequence, Double J, The Guardian, The New Yorker, NME, and Taste of Country. Publications that featured Cowboy Carter in the top 25 of their lists include Clash, Dazed, The Independent, the Los Angeles Times, The Ringer, Slant Magazine, Time Out, The Times and Yardbarker. The record was also mentioned in unranked lists by AllMusic, the Associated Press, Cosmopolitan, HuffPost, NPR, The Tennessean, Uproxx and Vogue.

On individual critics' lists, while The Philadelphia Inquirer's Dan DeLuca numbered Cowboy Carter at the fourth position, The Atlantic's Spencer Kornhaber at fifth, and Sound Opinions' Jim DeRogatis at eleventh, the album was, respectively, ranked second and seventh by Variety's Willman and Steven J. Horowitz, and tenth and fifteenth by The New York Times' Lindsay Zoladz and Jon Caramanica. Mesfin Fekadu of The Hollywood Reporter listed the release at first place.

Select year-end rankings
Publication	List	Rank	Ref.
Billboard	Staff List: The 50 Best Albums of 2024	2	
Business Insider	The Best Albums of 2024	1	
Consequence	The 50 Best Albums of 2024	5	
Esquire	The 10 Best Albums of 2024	1	
The Hollywood Reporter	The 10 Best Albums of 2024	1	
People	Best Albums of 2024: People Picks the Top 10	1	
PopMatters	The 80 Best Albums of 2024	2	
Rolling Stone	The 100 Best Albums of 2024	2	
The Daily Telegraph	The 10 best albums of 2024, ranked	2	
Variety	Chris Willman's Best Albums of 2024	2	

== Accolades ==
Cowboy Carter earned the most nominations at the 67th Annual Grammy Awards, with 11 nominations across multiple genres, including pop, country, Americana and melodic rap. It is the third-most nominated album in Grammy history, behind Michael Jackson's Thriller (1982) and Quincy Jones' The Dude (1981), and the most nominated album by a woman. Additionally, Cowboy Carter increased Beyoncé's career total nominations to 99, breaking her tie with Jay-Z to become the most nominated artist of all time. She joined Kendrick Lamar and Jon Batiste as the artists who received the third-most nominations in one night. The Recording Academy CEO Harvey Mason Jr. declared Cowboy Carter's broad nominations as a "really impressive" feat, explaining that because Grammy voters are limited to voting in particular fields, Beyoncé's nominations across genres shows that "totally different subsets of voters all really resonated with the music". The album won Best Country Duo/Group Performance for "II Most Wanted", Best Country Album and Album of the Year.

Cowboy Carter did not receive any nominations at the 58th Annual Country Music Association Awards. Several publications attributed this to conservatism and racism against Black artists in the country music industry. Cowboy Carter collaborator Shaboozey, who received his first two CMA Awards nominations, expressed his gratitude for Beyoncé following the lack of nominations, writing: "Thank you Beyoncé for opening a door for us, starting a conversation, and giving us one of the most innovative country albums of all time". Cowboy Carter involved artist Dolly Parton spoke on Beyonce's apparent snub, "She's a country girl in Texas and Louisiana, so she grew up with that base. It wasn't like she just appeared out of nowhere [...] There's so many wonderful country artists that, I guess probably the country music field, they probably thought, well, we can't really leave out some of the ones that spend their whole life doing that [...] I think it was just more of what the country charts and the country artists were doing, that do that all the time, not just a specialty album."

Despite winning Best Country Album at the Grammy on February 2, 2025, Cowboy Carter also did not receive any nominations at the 60th Academy of Country Music Awards on the ceremony nominations annuncement on March 27, 2026. As happened at the 2024 CMA Awards, publications attributed this to conservatism and racism in the country music industry.

Awards and nominations
Organization	Year	Category	Result	Ref.
People's Choice Country Awards	2024	The Album of 2024	Nominated	
Danish Music Awards	2024	International Album of the Year	Nominated	
Billboard Music Awards	2024	Top Country Album	Nominated	
Grammy Awards	2025	Album of the Year	Won	
Grammy Awards	2025	Best Country Album	Won	
NAACP Image Awards	2025	Outstanding Album	Won	
Hungarian Music Awards	2025	Foreign Classic Pop-Rock Album or Recording of the Year	Won	
American Music Awards	2025	Album of the Year	Nominated	
American Music Awards	2025	Favorite Country Album	Won	

== Commercial performance ==
=== Streaming ===
Cowboy Carter landed Beyoncé her biggest streaming week ever and broke streaming records on several platforms. On Spotify, the album became one of the most-streamed albums in a single day in 2024, the biggest debut of the year for a country album, and the biggest debut ever for any album by a Black woman, with over 76 million streams globally in its first day. Cowboy Carter also marks the most first-day streams for a country album by a female artist in the history of Amazon Music.

=== United States ===
Cowboy Carter also broke several chart records. In the United States, Cowboy Carter debuted at number one on the Billboard 200, with 407,000 album-equivalent units. In doing so, Beyoncé became the first woman and second artist overall to debut her first eight albums at number one. Cowboy Carter debuted at number one on the Americana/Folk Albums, and Top Country Albums charts, making Beyoncé the first Black woman to have a number-one country album. The album remained atop the Billboard 200 for two weeks, her first multi-week number one since 2013's Beyoncé. With all 23 eligible songs on Cowboy Carter debuting on the Billboard Hot 100, Beyoncé became the first artist to have every song on three consecutive albums chart on the Billboard Hot 100. The album gave African-American country artists Martell, Adell, Kennedy, Roberts, Spencer, Jones and Shaboozey their first chart entries and brought Beyoncé's career total Hot 100 entries to 106, the third highest for a female artist. Beyoncé also topped eighteen Billboard charts the week of Cowboy Carter's release, including the Artist 100, Hot 100 Songwriters and Hot 100 Producers; she also became the first artist to simultaneously hold the number one positions on both the Top Country Albums and the Billboard Dance/Electronic Albums charts, with Renaissance atop the latter. Cowboy Carter has spent over 50 weeks on the Billboard 200, making Beyoncé the Black woman with the most albums to chart 50 or more weeks, surpassing Whitney Houston and Mariah Carey with a total of eight.

=== Internationally ===
By its fourth day of release, Cowboy Carter was outselling the rest of the week's top five bestselling albums combined in the UK. The album debuted at number one on the UK Albums Chart selling 40,000 copies in its first week. This became Beyoncé's fifth album to do so as a solo act, and her sixth including Destiny's Child's discography. The album also debuted at number one on the Official Vinyl Albums Chart and has spent eight consecutive weeks at number one on the UK Country Albums Chart, becoming the first album by an African American female artist to reach the top spot on that chart. With "Texas Hold 'Em" returning to number one on the UK Singles Chart concurrently with the album's release, Beyoncé topped both charts simultaneously for the first time since Dangerously in Love and "Crazy in Love" did so in 2003. Beyoncé also became the first Black artist to top the UK Charts with a country album and the first artist to simultaneously top the Album Chart and Singles Charts with a country album and a country single.

In Canada, the album debuted at number one on the Canadian Albums Chart, becoming Beyoncé's fifth album to achieve this as well as her tenth top-ten project in the country. Twenty out of 23 eligible songs on Cowboy Carter debuted on the Canadian Hot 100, giving African-American country artists Martell, Adell, Kennedy, Roberts, Spencer, Jones and Shaboozey their first chart entries and bringing Beyoncé's career total Canadian Hot 100 entries to 84.

In Australia, the album debuted at number one on the ARIA Albums Chart, becoming the singer's fourth consecutive project to achieve this since Beyoncé (2013). It also became the first country-genre album by a female artist to top the chart since 2017, when the top position was occupied by Shania Twain's Now. The album remained atop the ARIA Chart for two consecutive weeks.

In Germany, the album debuted atop the German Albums Chart, becoming Beyoncé's first number one album as a solo artist since Dangerously in Love topped the chart in 2003.

== Cultural and societal impact ==
Upon release, Cowboy Carter had a significant impact on music, fashion, business and culture, with Stevie Wonder and Variety's Chris Willman suggesting it may be the most-discussed album of the 21st century. (Note: Supported by multiple sources:) Cowboy Carter was widely discussed in the media following its release, with all major news networks broadcasting features exploring the impact of the album. (Note: Supported by multiple sources:) CNN released a documentary on Max titled Call Me Country: Beyoncé & Nashville's Renaissance, which explores the album's impact on the country music landscape and the inclusion of Black artists within the genre. An episode of Nightline focused on the album and its impact on the country music space.

=== Country music ===
Cowboy Carter increased the listenership of country music and made it more accessible to new audiences, with publications describing it as "a cultural shift", "a watershed moment" and "a tipping point" in the genre's history. (Note: Supported by multiple sources:) The album drove over 36 million people to stream country music for the first time on Spotify. The album was credited by The Times as making country music become mainstream in the UK, with one survey finding that 60% of British respondents started listening to country music following the release of Cowboy Carter. In Sweden, the number of people listening to country music increased by 60% following the release of the album, which is the largest increase for any genre in Swedish history. A worldwide study found that over one-third of Gen Z respondents began listening to country music after Beyoncé entered the genre. There was a 38% increase in views of country music videos globally on Vevo following the album's release, as well as a 40% increase in Black 18–34-year-olds listening to country radio. Cowboy Carter was said to redefine what it means to be a country artist, with Emi Tuyetnhi Tran from NBC News commenting that it will "open the floodgates" for other country musicians. Cowboy Carter sparked discourse on the boundaries of the country music genre and its roots within Black music, and drove cultural conversations on the inclusion of Black artists within the genre. (Note: Supported by multiple sources:)

==== Country artists ====
Cowboy Carter boosted the careers of rising country acts. In The Tennessean, Andrea Williams wrote that Beyoncé opened the door for others in country music, proving Black songwriters, producers and musicians belong in the genre. NPR's Amanda Marie Martínez wrote that the album revealed the "strong demand" for country music made by Black artists and a "growing community" of Black country fans.

After featuring on the album, Shaboozey advanced the release of his single "A Bar Song (Tipsy)" to take advantage of his increased visibility. The song would peak at number 1 on the Billboard Hot 100 and Billboard Hot Country Songs, replacing Beyoncé's own "Texas Hold 'Em", becoming the first time in history that two Black artists led the latter chart back to back. Shaboozey thanked Beyoncé for "changing [his] life" and "opening a door for us".

Linda Martell, who was the first commercially successful Black female country artist, saw a 127,430 percent increase in streams of her music after twice appearing on the album. In 2025, "Color Him Father", her 1969 breakthrough record, was inducted into the Grammy Hall of Fame as a result of the increased recognition in her catalog.

Other Black female country musicians also saw a significant increase in streams due to the album, such as Reyna Roberts (250%), Rissi Palmer (110%), Tanner Adell (188%) and K. Michelle (185%), while Adia Victoria, Amira Unplugged, Brittney Spencer, Mickey Guyton, Tiera Kennedy, Rhiannon Giddens and Sacha also saw increases in their music sales. Black-led country organizations such as the Black Opry also received a significant increase in followers.

=== Recognition ===
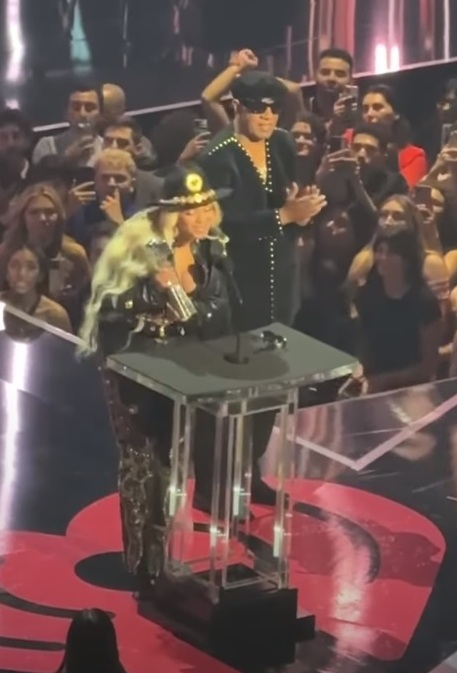
Stevie Wonder (right), when presenting Beyoncé with the iHeart Radio Innovator Award, praised Cowboy Carter as a "masterpiece" that is "changing music and culture".

Cowboy Carter received extensive praise from musicians. Stevie Wonder declared Cowboy Carter a "masterpiece" that is "changing music and culture". Paul McCartney, Nancy Sinatra and Linda Martell all praised the album and shared their pride of receiving the "honor" of contributing to the album. Jon Batiste characterized the album as "a work of such unimaginable impact and artistic firepower by a once in a generation artist" and thanked Beyoncé for allowing him to be a part of it. Batiste described the album as the moment "where we dismantle the genre machine", adding: "When many leading artists see a similar vision at the same time, that's when you know a major shift is happening. A new era, long time coming. Let's liberate ourselves from genre and break the barriers that marginalize who we are and the art that we create".

Country musicians such as Dolly Parton, Reba McEntire, Brandi Carlile, Melissa Etheridge, Rosanne Cash, Luke Bryan, Miranda Lambert, Jelly Roll, Darius Rucker, Lainey Wilson, Billy Ray Cyrus, Maren Morris, Mickey Guyton, Kelsea Ballerini and Sugarland all praised the album and Beyoncé's venture into country music. Country-pop singer-songwriter Shania Twain hailed Cowboy Carter and praised Beyoncé for bringing country music to new audiences and expanding its scope, which Twain said was reminiscent of how artists in her childhood (such as Johnny Cash) reshaped the boundaries of the genre. Country singer-songwriter Carlene Carter, daughter of June Carter Cash, released a statement praising Cowboy Carter and describing Beyoncé as part of the Carter Family, writing: "In my book, she's one of us Carter women and we have always pushed the boundaries by trying whatever music we felt in our hearts and taking spirit-driven risks... I am here to let Beyoncé and all those nay-sayers know that I admire and love her and all she does". Smokey Robinson praised Beyoncé for writing country music and described her as "one of the most talented people to come along in a long, long, long, long time".

Cowboy Carter also received praise from political figures. Former First Lady Michelle Obama posted on social media about Cowboy Carter, writing that the album has "changed the game" by "helping redefine a music genre and transform our culture". Vice President Kamala Harris also praised the album on social media, writing: "Thank you for reminding us to never feel confined to other people's perspective of what our lane is. You have redefined a genre and reclaimed country music's Black roots. Your music continues to inspire us all". Martin Luther King III expressed his gratitude for Cowboy Carter and described it as "joyous, positive and reaffirming", while his wife Arndrea Waters King called Beyoncé "courageous" for stepping into the country scene and sparking conversation on the origins of country music in the Black community. Other politicians who praised the album include Michigan Governor Gretchen Whitmer, Wisconsin Governor Tony Evers and Texas Congressman Colin Allred.

=== Fashion and lifestyle ===
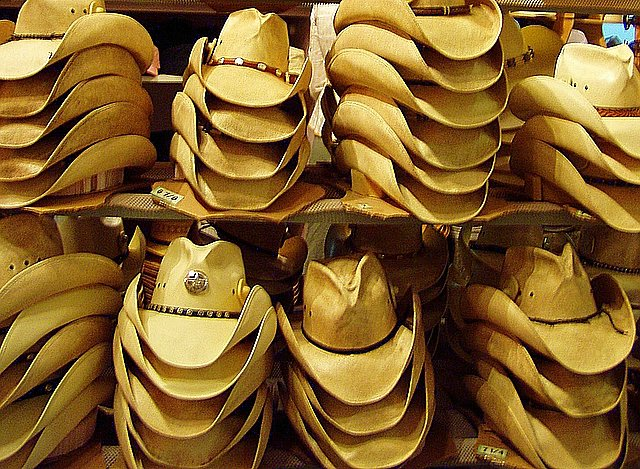
Cowboy Carter made Western wear a defining fashion trend for 2024 and led to a 326% surge in sales of cowboy hats.

Beyoncé's embrace of country music and culture ignited fashion trends and boosted sales of Western wear. Cowboy Carter helped transform cowboy fashion and aesthetics from a "caricature" into a "staple of the modern wardrobe" according to Vogue, while Vanessa Friedman, fashion director and chief fashion critic at The New York Times, wrote that Beyoncé has shifted the industry by mainstreaming Western aesthetics and determining the "look of the moment". Cowboy Carter led to a surge in interest in Western clothing, including an increase in searches for Western-style jeans (610%), bolo ties (566%), flared denim (372%), cowboy boots (224%) and cowboy hats (213%). Hat brand Stetson reported an increase in interest in their products following Beyoncé's embrace of Western lifestyle.

Cowboy Carter led to a 326 percent surge in sales of cowboy hats, while units sold of boots and fringed suede jackets both jumped by 45 percent. Fast fashion retailers such as Forever 21 increased the amount of Western clothing available for sale by over 300 percent due to the album. Inspired by the album, the prominence of Western and country styling within the fashion landscape increased by 45 percent. The Ralph Lauren Corporation designer brand was inspired by the trend for their 2024 fall/winter collection. GQ's Editor-in-Chief Will Welch credited Cowboy Carter for inspiring the 'American Rodeo' western theme of their 29th annual Men of the Year party.

In the UK, a national survey found that 25% of respondents took up line dancing and 40% started wearing Western clothing following the release of Cowboy Carter. Publications reported that the album aided a reclamation of country identity and western culture by Black people. The album had an impact on rodeos in Canada such as the Calgary Stampede, broadening its audience.

=== Business ===
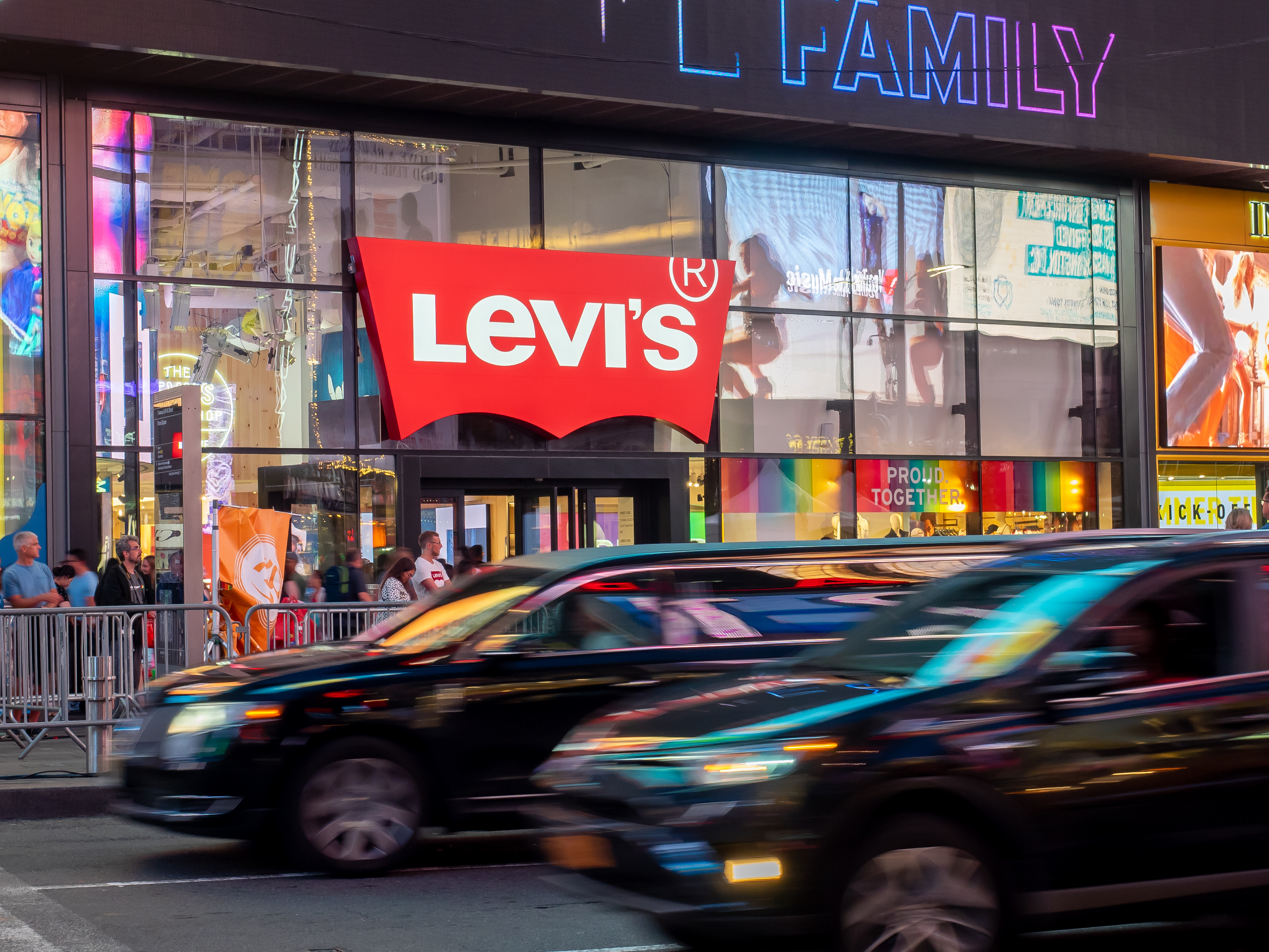
Levi's experienced 20% surges in both its stock value and store footfall after Beyoncé referenced the brand on Cowboy Carter.

After Beyoncé referenced the American clothing company Levi Strauss & Co. on the Cowboy Carter track "Levii's Jeans", the company reported a 20% boost on their stock price. The album singlehandedly generated an additional $1.2 million for the brand, from an increase of 1.5 billion impressions online. Levi's also noted a 20% rise in footfall at US stores after the release of the album, while British retailer John Lewis & Partners reported that searches for "women's Levi's jeans" were up 263% since the record was announced. In reference to the track name, Levi's added a second letter "i" to its name and logo on social media. Levi Strauss CFO Harmit Singh described Beyoncé as "the center of culture, the cultural czar", adding: "We are humbled and honored that she chose us to talk about our brand".

Following the release of Cowboy Carter, ridesharing company Uber offered 16% off to riders who use the code "16CARRIAGES", a reference to a song on the album. In response, Lyft offered its riders 50% off with the code "SPAGHETTI24", another reference to a song on the album. Lyft also changed images of cars on its map to white horses as a reference to the Cowboy Carter album cover.

== Track listing ==
Cowboy Carter track listing
No.	Title	Writer(s)	Producer(s)	Length
1.	"Ameriican Requiem"	Beyoncé Knowles-Carter; Ernest Wilson; Jon Batiste; Raphael Saadiq; Atia Boggs; Camaron Ochs; Tyler Johnson; Darius Scott; Derek Dixie; Shawn Carter; Michael Price; Dan Walsh; Stephen Stills	Beyoncé^{[p]}; No I.D.; Batiste; T. Johnson^{[c]}; Khirye Tyler^{[a]}; Dixie^{[a]}; Kuk Harrell^{[v]}	5:25
2.	"Blackbiird" (with Brittney Spencer, Reyna Roberts, Tanner Adell and Tiera Kennedy)	Lennon–McCartney	Beyoncé^{[p]}; Paul McCartney; Tyler^{[a]}; Harrell^{[v]}	2:11
3.	"16 Carriages"	Knowles-Carter; Dave Hamelin; Boggs; Saadiq	Beyoncé^{[p]}; Hamelin; Ink; Saadiq^{[a]}; Stuart White^{[a]}	3:47
4.	"Protector" (with Rumi Carter)	Knowles-Carter; Ryan Beatty; Ochs; Jack Rochon	Beyoncé^{[p]}; Rochon	3:04
5.	"My Rose"	Knowles-Carter; Shawntoni Nichols	Beyoncé^{[p]}; Mamii	0:53
6.	"Smoke Hour Willie Nelson" (with Willie Nelson)	Knowles-Carter; Leah Takele; Charles Anderson; Edward House Jr.; Sister Rosetta Tharpe; Chuck Berry; Jesse Stone	Beyoncé	0:50
7.	"Texas Hold 'Em"	Knowles-Carter; Elizabeth Lowell Boland; Megan Bülow; Brian Bates; Nate Ferraro; Saadiq	Beyoncé^{[p]}; Killah B; Ferraro; Saadiq^{[c]}; White^{[a]}; Hit-Boy^{[a]}; Mariel Gomerez^{[a]}	3:53
8.	"Bodyguard"	Knowles-Carter; Saadiq; Beatty; Boland; Leven Kali; Nichols	Saadiq; Beyoncé^{[v]}	4:00
9.	"Dolly P" (with Dolly Parton)	Parton; Knowles-Carter; Takele	Beyoncé; Rochon; Nova Wav^{[a]}	0:22
10.	"Jolene"	Parton; Knowles-Carter^{[l]}; Denisia Andrews^{[l]}; Brittany Coney^{[l]}; Terius Gesteelde-Diamant^{[l]}	Beyoncé^{[p]}; Rochon; Tyler^{[a]}; Alex Vickery^{[v]}	3:09
11.	"Daughter"	Knowles-Carter; Ochs; Simon Mårtensson; Gesteelde-Diamant; S. Carter; Dixie	Beyoncé^{[p]}; Ochs; Mårtensson; Dixie^{[c]}	3:23
12.	"Spaghettii" (with Linda Martell and Shaboozey)	Knowles-Carter; Gesteelde-Diamant; S. Carter; Collins Chibueze; Tyler; Dedé Mandrake	Beyoncé^{[p]}; Swizz Beatz; Tyler^{[c]}	2:38
13.	"Alliigator Tears"	Knowles-Carter; Gesteelde-Diamant; Tyler; Jack Siegel	Beyoncé^{[p]}; The-Dream; Tyler^{[c]}	2:59
14.	"Smoke Hour II" (with Willie Nelson)	Knowles-Carter; Takele; Hamelin; Jeff Gitelman	Beyoncé; Hamelin	0:29
15.	"Just for Fun" (with Willie Jones)	Knowles-Carter; Beatty; Hamelin; Gitelman	Beyoncé^{[p]}; Hamelin; Vickery^{[v]}	3:24
16.	"II Most Wanted" (with Miley Cyrus)	Knowles-Carter; Cyrus; Michael Pollack; Ryan Tedder	Beyoncé^{[p]}; Shawn Everett; Pollack; Cyrus; Jonathan Rado^{[a]}	3:28
17.	"Levii's Jeans" (with Post Malone)	Knowles-Carter; Austin Post; Gesteelde-Diamant; Nile Rodgers; S. Carter	Beyoncé; The-Dream; Louis Bell^{[v]}	4:17
18.	"Flamenco"	Knowles-Carter; Nichols	Beyoncé^{[p]}; Mamii	1:40
19.	"The Linda Martell Show" (with Linda Martell)	Knowles-Carter; Takele	Beyoncé	0:28
20.	"Ya Ya"	Knowles-Carter; Gesteelde-Diamant; S. Carter; Oliver Rodigan; Harry Edwards; Klara Mkhatshwa Munk-Hansen; Anaïs Marinho; Lee Hazlewood; Brian Wilson; Mike Love	Beyoncé^{[p]}; The-Dream; Cadenza^{[c]}; Edwards^{[c]}; Tyler^{[a]}	4:34
21.	"Oh Louisiana"	Berry	Beyoncé; The-Dream	0:52
22.	"Desert Eagle"	Knowles-Carter; Jabbar Stevens; Miranda Johnson; Marcus Reddick	Beyoncé^{[p]}; Bah Christ; Reddick	1:12
23.	"Riiverdance"	Knowles-Carter; Gesteelde-Diamant; Rachel Keen; Mark Spears	Beyoncé^{[p]}; The-Dream	4:11
24.	"II Hands II Heaven"	Knowles-Carter; Hamelin; Beatty; Rochon; Gesteelde-Diamant; Spears	Beyoncé; Hamelin; Rochon^{[c]}	5:41
25.	"Tyrant" (with Dolly Parton)	Knowles-Carter; Ochs; Gesteelde-Diamant; David Doman; Dominic Redenczki; Ezemdi Chikwendu	Hamelin; D.A. Got That Dope; Tyler^{[a]}; Beyoncé^{[v]}; Harrell^{[v]}	4:10
26.	"Sweet Honey Buckiin'" (with Shaboozey)	Knowles-Carter; Pharrell Williams; Chibueze; Gesteelde-Diamant; S. Carter; Hank Cochran; Harlan Howard	Beyoncé^{[p]}; Pharrell	4:56
27.	"Amen"	Knowles-Carter; Hamelin; Danielle Balbuena; Ochs; T. Johnson; Ian Fitchuk; Scott; Dixie; Ricky Lawson^{[l]}	Beyoncé^{[p]}; Hamelin; T. Johnson^{[c]}; Dixie^{[a]}; Fitchuk^{[a]}; 070 Shake^{[a]}; Sean Solymar^{[a]}	2:25
Total length:				78:21

Notes

- "Smoke Hour Willie Nelson" is stylized as "Smoke Hour ★ Willie Nelson".
- "Sweet Honey Buckiin'" is stylized as "Sweet ★ Honey ★ Buckiin'".
- Limited edition vinyl and CD releases of the album exclude "Spaghettii", "The Linda Martell Show", "Ya Ya" and "Oh Louisiana", and "Flamenco" is additionally excluded on the vinyl release.
- "Riiverdance", "II Hands II Heaven" and "Tyrant" are extended on limited edition releases.
- ^{^[a]} indicates an additional producer
- ^{^[c]} indicates a co-producer
- ^{^[p]} indicates a primary and vocal producer
- ^{^[v]} indicates a vocal producer
- ^{^[l]} indicates an additional lyricist

=== Samples, interpolations and covers ===
- "Ameriican Requiem"
  - contains excerpts from "Heart of the City (Ain't No Love)", written by Shawn Carter, Michael Price and Dan Walsh and performed by Jay-Z, as well as Jay-Z's performance of the song on MTV Unplugged.
  - contains an interpolation of "For What It's Worth", written by Stephen Stills and performed by Buffalo Springfield.
- "Blackbiird"
  - is a cover of the Beatles' 1968 song "Blackbird", and features a sample of the instrumental from the original master recording.
- "Smoke Hour Willie Nelson"
  - contains excerpts from "Laughing Yodel", written and performed by Charles Anderson.
  - contains excerpts from "Grinnin' in Your Face", written and performed by Son House.
  - contains excerpts from "Down by the River Side", written and performed by Sister Rosetta Tharpe.
  - contains excerpts from "Maybellene", written and performed by Chuck Berry.
  - contains excerpts from "Don't Let Go", written by Jesse Stone and performed by Roy Hamilton.
- "Jolene"
  - is a cover of Dolly Parton's "Jolene", with new lyrics.
- "Daughter"
  - contains elements of Violin Concerto in D Major, Op. III No. 1: II. Adagio by Joseph Bologne, Chevalier de Saint-Georges.
  - contains an interpolation of the aria "Caro Mio Ben", written and composed by Tommaso Giordani.
- "Spaghettii"
  - contains a sample of "Aquecimento das Danadas", written and performed by O Mandrake.
- "Ya Ya"
  - contains excerpts from "These Boots Are Made for Walkin'", written by Lee Hazlewood and performed by Nancy Sinatra.
  - contains interpolation from "Good Vibrations", written by Brian Wilson and Mike Love and performed by the Beach Boys.
- "Oh Louisiana"
  - contains excerpts from "Oh Louisiana", written and performed by Chuck Berry.
- "II Hands II Heaven"
  - contains an uncredited sample of the Underworld song "Born Slippy Nuxx", written by Rick Smith, Karl Hyde and Darren Emerson.
- "Sweet Honey Buckiin'"
  - contains interpolation from "I Fall to Pieces", written by Hank Cochran and Harlan Howard and performed by Patsy Cline.

== Personnel ==
Musicians

- Beyoncé – lead vocals (all tracks), clapping (track 10), percussion (23)
- Khirye Tyler – bass (tracks 1, 2, 7, 20), percussion (1, 20–23), drums (1, 15, 20), synthesizer (1), strings (2, 18), violin (2), piano (7), guitar (15), horns (20), programming (26)
- Linda Martell – spoken word (tracks 12, 19)
- Ink – vocals (track 1), guitar (2)
- Tanner Adell – vocals (tracks 1, 2)
- Raphael Saadiq – drums (tracks 1, 7); bass, piano (7, 8); organ (7), guitar (8, 20), keyboards (8)
- LaMarcus Eldridge – choir (tracks 1, 10, 11, 15, 27)
- Steve Epting – choir (tracks 1, 10, 11, 15, 27)
- Brooke Brewer – choir (tracks 1, 11, 15, 27)
- Camille Grigsby – choir (tracks 1, 11, 15, 27)
- Cedrit Leonard – choir (tracks 1, 11, 15, 27)
- Chelsea Miller – choir (tracks 1, 11, 15, 27)
- Donald Paige – choir (tracks 1, 11, 15, 27)
- Dwanna Orange – choir (tracks 1, 11, 15, 27)
- George Young – choir (tracks 1, 11, 15, 27)
- Jason Morales – choir (tracks 1, 11, 15, 27)
- Jenelle Dunkley – choir (tracks 1, 11, 15, 27)
- Jerome Wayne – choir (tracks 1, 11, 15, 27)
- Kiandra Richardson – choir (tracks 1, 11, 15, 27)
- Lakeisha Lewis – choir (tracks 1, 11, 15, 27)
- Mabvuto Carpenter – choir (tracks 1, 11, 15, 27)
- Naarai Jacobs – choir (tracks 1, 11, 15, 27)
- Nava Morris – choir (tracks 1, 11, 15, 27)
- Phylicia Hill – choir (tracks 1, 11, 15, 27)
- Princess Fortier – choir (tracks 1, 11, 15, 27)
- Storm Chapman – choir (tracks 1, 11, 15, 27)
- No I.D. – guitar, keyboards, sitar (track 1); drums (15)
- Dixson – drums, vocals (track 1)
- Jon Batiste – guitar, keyboards, sitar (track 1)
- Camaron Ochs – vocals (track 1), clapping (25)
- Lemar Carter – drums (tracks 2, 7, 8, 20)
- Brittney Spencer – vocals (track 2), background vocals (25)
- Reyna Roberts – vocals (track 2), background vocals (25)
- Tiera Kennedy – vocals (track 2), background vocals (25)
- Dave Hamelin – organ, synthesizer (tracks 2, 27); drums, guitar, piano (2); bass (15)
- Paul McCartney – guitar (track 2)
- Robert Randolph – steel guitar (track 3), pedal steel guitar (20)
- Justus West – guitar (track 3)
- Gavin Williams – organ (track 3)
- Justin Schipper – steel guitar (track 3)
- Ryan Svendsen – trumpet (track 3)
- Ryan Beatty – background vocals (tracks 4, 8, 15)
- Jack Rochon – guitar (tracks 4, 9, 10), bass (24)
- Gary Clark Jr. – guitar (tracks 4, 11, 22, 24)
- Rumi Carter – spoken word (track 4)
- Willie Nelson – spoken word (track 6, 14)
- Rhiannon Giddens – banjo, viola (track 7)
- Killah B – drums (track 7)
- Elizabeth Lowell Boland – piano (track 7), background vocals (8)
- Nathan Ferraro – guitar (tracks 7, 11), piano (7)
- Hit-Boy – synthesizer (track 7)
- The-Dream – drums (track 8), clapping (10), background vocals (20, 24, 25); bass, guitar, vocals (23); drum machine, percussion (24)
- Ross Garren – harmonica (tracks 8, 14, 15)
- Dolly Parton – spoken word (track 9), vocals (25)
- Denisia Andrews – vocals (track 9)
- Jack Siegal – guitar (tracks 10, 12–14)
- Caleb Curry – choir (track 10)
- Jaden Gray – choir (track 10)
- Jamal Moore – choir (track 10)
- Jerel Duren – choir (track 10)
- Kadeem Nichols – choir (track 10)
- Michael Shorts – choir (track 10)
- Dora Melissa Vargas – clapping (track 10)
- Jay-Z – clapping (track 10)
- Stevie Wonder – harmonica (track 10)
- Willie Jones – vocals (track 10)
- Simon Mårtensson – bass, drums, guitar (track 11)
- Rod Castro – guitar (track 11)
- Jeff Gitelman – harmonica (tracks 14, 15)
- Harv – drums (track 15)
- Derek Dixie – conductor (track 15), synthesizer (27)
- Adrienne Woods – strings (track 15)
- Bianca McClure – strings (track 15)
- Chelsea Gwizdala – strings (track 15)
- Crystal Alforque – strings (track 15)
- Marta Honer – strings (track 15)
- Rhea Hosanny – strings (track 15)
- Stephanie Matthews – strings (track 15)
- Stephanie Yu – strings (track 15)
- Adam Granduciel – acoustic guitar, electric guitar (track 16)
- Justin Brown – acoustic guitar, drums (track 16)
- Sean Watkins – acoustic guitar (track 16)
- Pino Palladino – bass (track 16)
- Sara Watkins – fiddle (track 16)
- Jonathan Rado – organ, piano, synthesizer (track 16)
- Michael Pollack – organ (track 16)
- Matt Pynn – pedal steel guitar (track 16)
- Miley Cyrus – vocals (track 16)
- Post Malone – vocals (track 17)
- Nile Rodgers – guitar (track 17)
- Mamii – guitar (track 18)
- Johnny May – violin (track 18)
- Harry Edwards – guitar (track 20)
- Marcus Reddick – bass (track 22)
- Bah Christ – guitar (track 22)
- Péter Kovács – violin (track 25)
- Anders Mouridsen – clapping (track 25)
- Pharrell – vocals (track 26)
- Arnetta Johnson – brass (track 27)
- Christopher Gray – brass (track 27)
- Christopher Johnson – brass (track 27)
- Crystal Torres – brass (track 27)
- Gabrielle Garo – brass (track 27)
- Jesse McGinty – brass (track 27)
- Lemar Guillary – brass (track 27)
- Omar Edwards – organ (track 27)
- Tyler Johnson – organ (track 27)
- Ian Fitchuk – piano (track 27)

Technical

- Colin Leonard – mastering
- Stuart White – mixing (tracks 1–3, 5–16, 18–22, 27), recording (1–18, 20, 22, 24, 25)
- Tony Maserati – mixing (tracks 4, 18)
- Shawn Everett – mixing, recording (track 16)
- Jaycen Joshua – mixing (tracks 17, 23)
- Mike Seaberg – mixing (tracks 17, 23)
- Chris Godbey – mixing (track 25)
- Leslie Brathwaite – mixing (track 26)
- Andrea Roberts – engineering (all tracks), recording (1, 4)
- John Cranfield – engineering (tracks 1, 2, 4–6, 8, 10–17, 19–27), recording (26, 27)
- Henrique Andrade – engineering (track 2), recording (1, 8, 12, 26)
- Kuk Harrell – engineering (track 25)
- Angelica "Jeli" Dorman – engineering (track 25), recording (1, 2)
- Dani Pampuri – recording (tracks 1, 4, 10, 11, 15, 18, 19, 22, 24, 27), engineering assistance (17)
- Lester Mendoza – recording (tracks 1, 15, 27)
- Hotae Alexander Jang – recording (tracks 3, 7, 8, 13, 15, 20)
- Dave Hamelin – recording (tracks 3, 14, 15, 24, 27)
- Jack Rochon – recording (track 4)
- Mamii – recording (tracks 5, 18)
- Alex Nibley – recording (track 7)
- Brandon Harding – recording (tracks 10, 17, 20–22, 25)
- Camaron Ochs – recording (track 11)
- Kyle Huffman – recording (tracks 11, 15, 27)
- Matheus Braz – recording (tracks 11, 12, 20, 24), editing (19), engineering assistance (all tracks)
- Nick Lobel – recording (tracks 11, 25)
- Steve Chadie – recording (track 14)
- Ian Gold – recording (track 16)
- Ivan Wayman – recording (track 16)
- Piéce Eatah – recording (track 16)
- Willie Linton – recording (track 17)
- Kristen Hilkert – recording (track 25)
- Mike Larson – recording (track 26)
- Konrad Snyder – recording (track 27)
- Tyler Johnson – recording (track 27)
- Khirye Tyler – editing (tracks 4, 11)
- Patrick Gardner – engineering assistance (tracks 1, 2, 4–6, 8–27)
- Conner McFarland – engineering assistance (tracks 1, 2, 4–6, 8, 10–27)
- Danforth Webster – engineering assistance (tracks 1, 2, 4–6, 8, 10–27)
- Garrett Duncan – engineering assistance (tracks 1, 2, 4–6, 8, 10–27)
- Jonathan Lopez Garcia – engineering assistance (tracks 1, 2, 4–6, 8, 10–27)
- Nick Sutton – engineering assistance (tracks 1, 2, 4–6, 8, 10–27)
- Terena Dawn – engineering assistance (tracks 1, 2, 4–6, 8, 10–27)
- Gabriella Wayne – engineering assistance (track 4)
- Julia Norelli – engineering assistance (track 4)
- Najeeb Jones – engineering assistance (track 4)
- Cameron Hogan – engineering assistance (track 11)
- Chris Bhikoo – engineering assistance (tracks 17, 23)
- Jacob Richards – engineering assistance (tracks 17, 23)

== Charts ==
=== Weekly charts ===
Weekly chart performance
Chart (2024)	Peak position
Australian Albums (ARIA)	1
Australian Country Albums (ARIA)	1
Austrian Albums (Ö3 Austria)	1
Belgian Albums (Ultratop Flanders)	1
Belgian Albums (Ultratop Wallonia)	1
Canadian Albums (Billboard)	1
Croatian International Albums (HDU)	9
Czech Albums (ČNS IFPI)	5
Danish Albums (Hitlisten)	1
Dutch Albums (Album Top 100)	1
Finnish Albums (Suomen virallinen lista)	11
French Albums (SNEP)	1
German Albums (Offizielle Top 100)	1
Greek Albums (IFPI)	17
Hungarian Albums (MAHASZ)	6
Icelandic Albums (Tónlistinn)	2
Irish Albums (IRMA)	1
Italian Albums (FIMI)	6
Japanese Albums (Oricon)	45
Japanese Hot Albums (Billboard Japan)	59
Lithuanian Albums (AGATA)	4
New Zealand Albums (RMNZ)	1
Norwegian Albums (VG-lista)	1
Polish Albums (ZPAV)	3
Portuguese Albums (AFP)	1
Scottish Albums (Official Charts)	1
Slovak Albums (ČNS IFPI)	4
Spanish Albums (Promusicae)	1
Swedish Albums (Sverigetopplistan)	1
Swiss Albums (Schweizer Hitparade)	1
UK Albums (Official Charts)	1
UK Americana Albums (Official Charts)	1
UK Country Albums (Official Charts)	1
US Billboard 200	1
US Americana/Folk Albums (Billboard)	1
US Top Country Albums (Billboard)	1

=== Year-end charts ===
Year-end chart performance
Chart (2024)	Position
Australian Albums (ARIA)	89
Australian Country Albums (ARIA)	11
Austrian Albums (Ö3 Austria)	49
Belgian Albums (Ultratop Flanders)	24
Belgian Albums (Ultratop Wallonia)	72
Danish Albums (Hitlisten)	59
Dutch Albums (Album Top 100)	15
French Albums (SNEP)	55
German Albums (Offizielle Top 100)	55
Global Albums (IFPI)	18
New Zealand Albums (RMNZ)	43
Portuguese Albums (AFP)	53
Spanish Albums (PROMUSICAE)	79
Swiss Albums (Schweizer Hitparade)	16
UK Albums (Official Charts)	43
US Billboard 200	21
US Top Country Albums (Billboard)	5
US Top Americana/Folk Albums (Billboard)	4

2025 year-end chart performance for Cowboy Carter
Chart (2025)	Position
French Albums (SNEP)	138
US Billboard 200	160

== Certifications ==
Certifications
Region	Certification	Certified units/sales
Belgium (BRMA)	Gold	10,000^{‡}
Brazil (Pro-Música Brasil)	2× Platinum	80,000^{‡}
Canada (Music Canada)	Platinum	80,000^{‡}
Denmark (IFPI Danmark)	Gold	10,000^{‡}
France (SNEP)	Platinum	100,000^{‡}
New Zealand (RMNZ)	Platinum	15,000^{‡}
Poland (ZPAV)	Gold	10,000^{‡}
Sweden (GLF)	Platinum	30,000^{‡}
United Kingdom (BPI)	Gold	100,000^{‡}
United States (RIAA)	Platinum	1,000,000^{‡}
^{‡} Sales+streaming figures based on certification alone.

== Release history ==
Release history
Initial release date	Edition	Format(s)	Ref.
March 29, 2024	Standard	Digital download; streaming; vinyl LP	
March 29, 2024	Limited	CD; vinyl LP	

== See also ==
- Beyoncé 2024 NFL Halftime Show
- 2024 in American music
- 2024 in country music
- African-American trail rides
- List of 2024 albums
- List of Billboard 200 number-one albums of 2024
- List of Top Country Albums number ones of 2024
- List of number-one albums of 2024 (Australia)
- List of number-one hits of 2024 (Austria)
- List of number-one albums of 2024 (Belgium)
- List of number-one albums of 2024 (Canada)
- List of number-one albums from the 2020s (Denmark)
- List of number-one hits of 2024 (France)
- List of number-one hits of 2024 (Germany)
- List of number-one albums of 2024 (Ireland)
- List of number-one albums from the 2020s (New Zealand)
- List of number-one albums in Norway
- List of number-one albums of 2024 (Portugal)
- List of number-one albums of 2024 (Scotland)
- List of number-one albums of 2024 (Spain)
- List of number-one singles and albums in Sweden
- List of number-one hits of 2024 (Switzerland)
- List of UK Albums Chart number ones of the 2020s
- Milestones and achievements for albums on Spotify
