= Tyrant (Beyoncé song) =

2024 song by Beyoncé featuring Dolly Parton

Song by Beyoncé and Dolly Parton

from the album Cowboy Carter
- Released: March 29, 2024
- Studio: Cave (Nashville, Tennessee); Westlake Recording (West Hollywood, California)
- Genre: Southern rap
- Length: 4:10
- Label: Parkwood; Columbia
- Songwriters: Beyoncé; Camaron Ochs; Terius Gesteelde-Diamant; David Doman; Dominik Redenczki; Ezemdi Chikwendu
- Producers: Dave Hamelin; D.A. Got That Dope

Lyric Video
- "Tyrant" on YouTube

"Tyrant" is a song by American singers Beyoncé and Dolly Parton, taken from Beyoncé's eighth studio album, Cowboy Carter (2024).

== Background and composition ==
The song was written by Beyoncé, Cam, The-Dream, Dominik Redenczki, Ezemdi Chikwendu, and produced by the singer herself with D.A. Got That Dope, Dave Hamelin, Khirye Tyler, and Kuk Harrell. Musically, the song pays homage to Dolly Parton's technique of rubbing the nails of the hand to reproduce a sound, invented for her song "9 to 5" (1980). It is a Southern rap track built on a looped violin sample and programmed trap beats using a Roland TR-808 drum. In an interview D.A. Got That Dope explained that he sent the song beat to The-Dream in 2023, without knowing it was selected by Beyoncé since her team invited him to Parkwood studio to hear the final result only some weeks before the album's release.

The song featured vocal contribution by Parton in the first half of the track, addressing Beyoncé as Cowboy Carter and inviting her to "strike a match and light up this juke joint!". The song is the second contribution by Parton on the album track order, after her speaking interlude "Dolly P." which introduces Beyoncé's cover of "Jolene".

== Critical reception ==
Kyle Denis of Billboard defined the song a "spiritual successor" of Renaissance's tracks "Thique", in which the singer "sing-raps over a sexy, fiddle-laden trap beat". In another article, Denis noted that there were shared lyrics in songs from Renaissance, such as "Cuff It" and "Alien Superstar".

Alexis Petridis of The Guardian also praised the song, associating it to Renaissance music influences. Mawunyo Gbogbo of ABC News Australia appreciated the song which musically "straddles both country and hip hop" and that "it hits you in the chest with that beat instantly and conclusively".

== Charts ==
Chart performance for "Tyrant"
Chart (2024–2025)	Peak position
Canada Hot 100 (Billboard)	71
Global 200 (Billboard)	64
Ireland (IRMA)	77
Portugal (AFP)	122
UK Singles (OCC)	83
UK Hip Hop/R&B (OCC)	17
US Billboard Hot 100	44
US Hot Country Songs (Billboard)	12
US Hot R&B/Hip-Hop Songs (Billboard)	18

== Certifications ==
Certifications for "Tyrant"
Region	Certification	Certified units/sales
Brazil (Pro-Música Brasil)	Platinum	40,000^{‡}
^{‡} Sales+streaming figures based on certification alone.
