= Reyna Roberts =

American singer-songwriter

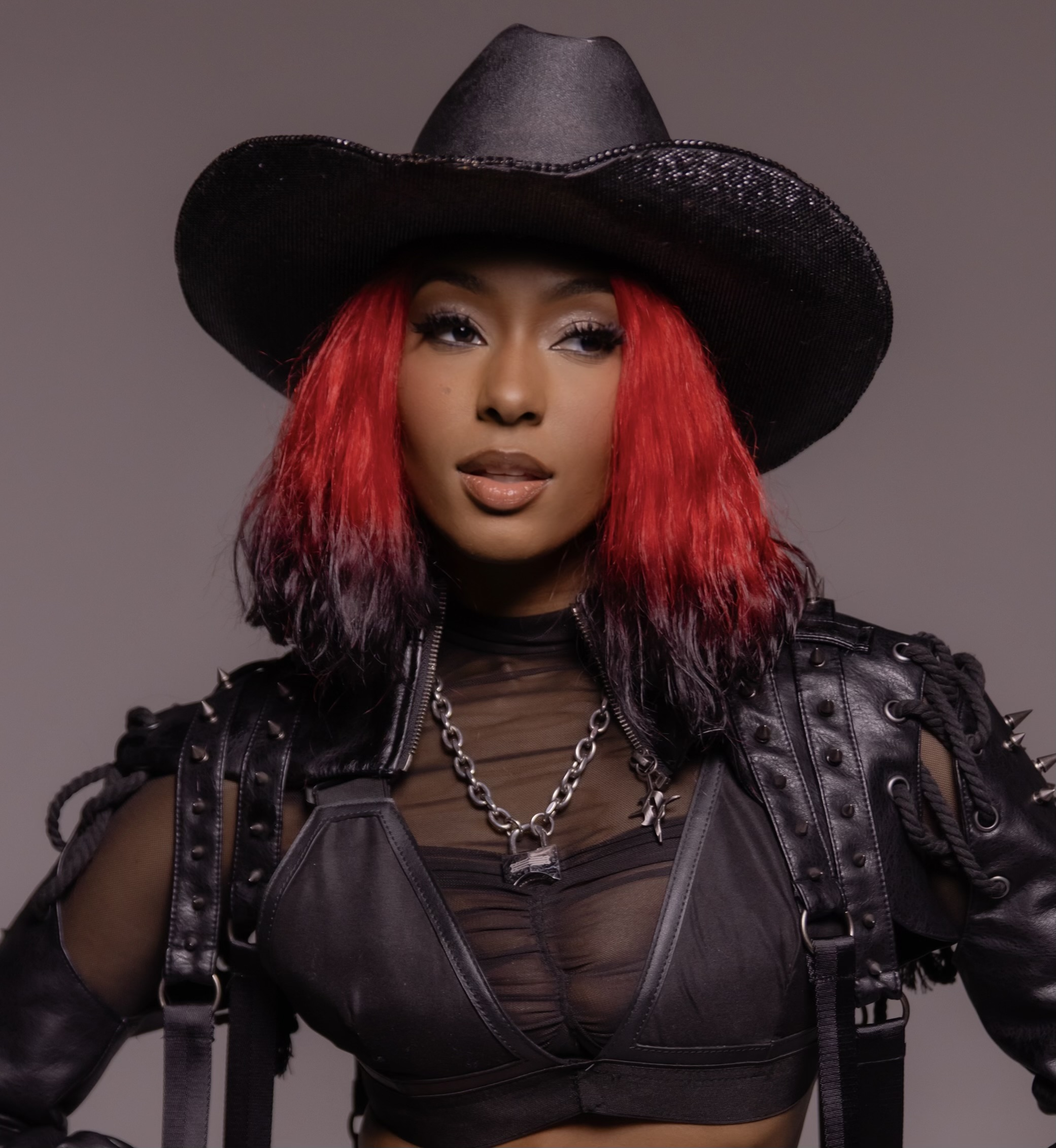
- Roberts in 2024
- Born: August 15, 1997 (age 28); Anchorage, Alaska, U.S.
- Occupations: Singer; songwriter; musician; entertainer
- Years active: 2020–present
- Musical career
- Genres: Country; hip-hop; pop
- Instruments: Vocals; piano
- Website: reynaroberts.com

Reyna Roberts is an American country singer-songwriter and pianist. She was featured on Beyoncé's song "Blackbiird", which charted at number 27 on the Billboard Hot 100 and was nominated for two People's Choice Country Awards in 2024. She was the first female country artist to ever perform at a Rolling Loud music festival, and she has shared the stage with Luke Combs and Orville Peck and toured with Reba McEntire and Jamey Johnson. Her single "Stompin' Grounds" was featured multiple times on ESPN's Monday Night Football.

One of the few visible Black women in country music, Roberts is known for acknowledging black mentors such as Lesley Riddle, and learning the history of the banjo and the term "Music City" for Nashville. In 2024, Roberts won a Hollywood Independent Music Award in the Country (Crossover) category.

== Early life ==
Reyna Roberts was born on August 15, 1997 in Anchorage, Alaska. Both of her parents were combat engineers in the Army and she was raised in Alabama and California. She was born two months premature, weighing two pounds, and doctors told her parents to play her music to help boost her brain development.

The first time Roberts performed music was at the age of three, when her mother took her to a karaoke bar in Alaska. When she was 10 years old, her family lost their home but paid for a storage unit to store her piano so Roberts could continue practicing the instrument. She continued playing in the family storage unit for three years.

Roberts moved with her parents multiple times in her childhood, living in Alaska, Alabama, Tennessee and California. Their move to California was to further her music career, not because of her parents' work.

Throughout high school Roberts competed on her high school wrestling team, and she began songwriting to woo the captain of the team. She recorded the resulting song, "Lying to Myself", in 2014. In 2016, she released the EP The Beginning, which included the song "I'm Coming For Ya", and was a featured guest on the Spring High School Nation Tour. She toured around the U.S. which also included performances by the Plain White T's.

== Career ==
Roberts lived in Nashville and Los Angeles from 2018 to 2020, going to songwriting camps to learn the craft and network with other songwriters and artists, and she met managers Ryan McMahan and Larry Pareigis during this period. She permanently relocated to Nashville in March 2020.

In June 2020, country-music singer Mickey Guyton posted a video of Roberts performing a cover of Carrie Underwood's song "Drinking Alone"; Carrie Underwood retweeting the video gave Roberts industry recognition and starting traction in the country-music business. Roberts stated, "I was stunned. To see her extend that level of kindness and support was humbling." In July 2020, Roberts released "Stompin' Grounds", (co-written and produced by Noah Henson) with Rolling Stone writing it "could go to bat with any song in the Top 20 on country radio right now."

Roberts joined CMT's Next Women in Country 2021 class along with Ashland Craft, Priscilla Block, Brittney Spencer, Hannah Dasher, MacKenzie Porter, Harper Grae, Tenille Arts, Sacha, and Chapel Hart. In March 2021, she was named one of RADIO.COM's "Leading Ladies" of Country Music.

She toured with Jamey Johnson on his 2021 summer tour, opening for him in seven cities. In August, she performed in her first festival in Washington State at the Watershed Fest.

In August 2021, Roberts signed on with Nashville-based publishing company Eclipse Music Group but later decided to part ways with them. In October 2021, Roberts was featured in Amazon Music's "Breakthrough Country Live" initiative. She released her debut album, Bad Girl Bible, Vol. 1, in 2023 and the NFL Network used her song "See Me Win" as part of their 2023 Spotlight Series.

In April 2024, Roberts was featured on Beyoncé's eighth studio album Cowboy Carter, both on the second track, a cover of the Beatles' "Blackbiird", and sang background vocals on the 25th track "Tyrant". She announced the winners for "Best Duo/Group Video of the Year" onstage at the 2024 CMT Music Awards and auditioned on America's Got Talent season 19. Roberts' "Raised Right" won a Hollywood Independent Music Award in the Country (Crossover) category in 2024, as well.

Roberts performed live with Diane Warren at the Hollywood Music in Media Awards in November 2024. Also in November 2024, Roberts was the first country female artist to ever perform at a Rolling Loud music festival.

== Advocacy ==
In addition to her music career, Roberts has raised money for military service members and veterans, as well as Rett syndrome awareness, the Wounded Warrior Project, Teen Impact Affiliates, and the Empowerment Project. She and her family are in the process of founding an organization to support homeless veterans.

== Artistry ==
Roberts has cited Carrie Underwood, Chris Stapleton, Gretchen Wilson, Rihanna and Beyoncé among her musical influences. The singer also explained that she grew up listening to Christina Aguilera, Destiny's Child, Gretchen Wilson and the Chicks.

After moving to Nashville in 2020, Roberts has written and performed with the likes of Jamey Johnson.

== Discography ==
=== Albums ===
Title	Details	Notes
Bad Girl Bible, Vol. 1	Release date: September 8, 2023; Label: EMPIRE Nashville	
The Lost Files	Release date: September 23, 2024	

=== Singles ===
Title	Details	Collaborators	Notes
"Lying to Myself"	Release date: 2016		
"67 (Winchester)"	Release date: January 31, 2019		
"Stompin' Grounds"	Release date: July 24, 2020; Distributed by Orchard/Sony	Noah Henson – co-writer	Used by ESPN in their Monday Night Football broadcasts Included in ESPN's "Grind Mode" playlist on Spotify
"Raised Right"	Release date: August 27, 2021	Danny Myrick – co-writer Kylie Sackley – co-writer	
"Countdown to Victory"	Release date: October 15, 2021	Noah Henson – co-writer	Written for ESPN in their Monday Night Football broadcast (Buffalo Bills vs. Tennessee Titans on October 18, 2021)

=== Extended Plays ===
Title	Details	Songs	Notes
The Beginning	Released: 2016?	"I'm Coming For Ya": Music video link	

== Awards and nominations ==
Year	Award	Work	Category	Result	Ref.
2024	People's Choice Country Awards	"Blackbiird" (with Beyoncé, Tanner Adell, Brittney Spencer and Tiera Kennedy)	The Collaboration Song of 2024	Nominated	
2024	People's Choice Country Awards	"Blackbiird" (with Beyoncé, Tanner Adell, Brittney Spencer and Tiera Kennedy)	The Cover Song of 2024	Nominated	
2024	Hollywood Independent Music Awards	"Raised Right"	Country (Crossover)	Won	
