= Tanner Adell =

American singer and songwriter

- Born: June 27, 1996 (age 30); Lexington, Kentucky, U.S.
- Origin: Nashville, Tennessee, U.S.
- Genres: Country
- Occupations: Singer; songwriter
- Years active: 2021–present
- Labels: Love Renaissance; Columbia
- Website: tanneradell.komi.io

Tanner Adell Anderson is an American country music singer and songwriter. Her debut album, Buckle Bunny, was released in 2023.

== Early life ==
Adell was born in Lexington, Kentucky, and was adopted and raised in Manhattan Beach, California. She spent summers growing up in Star Valley, Wyoming. She learned to play piano, violin and string bass and taught herself guitar, then studied commercial music at Utah Valley University. She was raised in the Church of Jesus Christ of Latter-day Saints and completed two years of missionary service in Stockholm.

== Career ==
Adell moved to Nashville, Tennessee, in 2021 to enter the country music business. She gained a following on social media and signed with Columbia Records.

Following a string of singles and an EP, Adell released her debut studio album, Buckle Bunny, on July 21, 2023. The term refers to female groupies of rodeo cowboys. The title track was her biggest viral hit to that point, and she had 360,000 followers on Instagram by the next month. It was named one of the best songs of the year by NPR.

In 2024, Adell featured on Beyoncé's Cowboy Carter album, the second album of her trilogy project. Adell appears on the track "Blackbiird", a cover of the Beatles' song, and provides background vocals on "Ameriican Requiem".

After parting ways with Columbia, it was announced in June 2024 that Adell had signed with Love Renaissance.

== Discography ==
=== Studio albums ===
List of studio albums, with selected details, chart positions and sales
Title	Album details
Buckle Bunny	Release date: July 21, 2023; Label: Columbia; Format: Digital download

=== EPs ===
- Last Call (2022)

=== Singles ===
- "Honky Tonk Heaven" (2021)
- "Country Girl Commandments" (2021)
- "Love You a Little Bit" (2022)
- "Tan Lines" (2022)
- "I Hate Texas" (2023)
- "FU-150." (2023)
- "Buckle Bunny" (2023)
- "Throw It Back." (2023)
- "Hot Pink Christmas" (2023)
- "Whiskey Blues" (2024)
- "Cowboy Break My Heart" (2024)
- "Silverado" (2024)
- "Going Blonde" (2025)

=== Appearances ===
List of guest appearances, on other projects or with other performing artists, showing year released and album name
Title	Year	Other performer(s)	Album
"Blackbiird"	2024	Beyoncé, Brittney Spencer, Reyna Roberts & Tiera Kennedy	Cowboy Carter
"American Requiiem" (Background Vocals)	2024	Beyoncé	Cowboy Carter
"Too Easy"	2024		Twisters: The Album

== Awards and nominations ==
Year	Award	Work	Category	Result	Ref.
2024	People's Choice Country Awards	"Blackbiird" (with Beyoncé, Reyna Roberts, Brittney Spencer and Tiera Kennedy)	The Collaboration Song of 2024	Nominated	
2024	People's Choice Country Awards	"Blackbiird" (with Beyoncé, Reyna Roberts, Brittney Spencer and Tiera Kennedy)	The Cover Song of 2024	Nominated	
