= Top Streaming Albums =

Albums chart published by Billboard magazine

The Top Streaming Albums is a record chart released weekly by Billboard magazine listing each week's most-streamed albums in the United States. The chart was inaugurated on the week of October 28, 2023, with Bad Bunny's Nadie Sabe Lo Que Va a Pasar Mañana as its first number one. The chart ranks Top 50 albums based on Streaming Equivalent Album (SEA) units, with one unit constituting 2,500 ad-supported streams or 1,000 paid/subscription streams generated from audio and video of songs from an album. The streaming data is compiled by Luminate from various on-demand streaming services such as Spotify, Apple Music, and Tidal. The Top Streaming Albums and the Top Album Sales are component charts of the Billboard 200.

== History ==
Billboard magazine has published a ranking of most popular albums since March 1945. For almost seven decades, record sales have been used as the sole metric for its albums ranking until December 13, 2014, when it began incorporating streaming into the Billboard 200 chart. A new term, Streaming Equivalent Album (SEA), was introduced by Billboard for the new methodology, where 1,500 streams of songs from an album being equal to one unit of album sale. In July 2018, Billboard revised the ratios used for SEA units to account for the relative value of streams on paid/subscription services like Apple Music or Amazon Music versus ad-supported platforms such as Spotify's free tier and YouTube. Under the updated ratios, 1,250 premium streams or 3,750 ad-supported streams were equal to one album unit.

Due to the continued domination of streaming in the music industry, Billboard launched the Top Streaming Albums on the week of October 28, 2023. The first number-one album on the chart was Bad Bunny's Nadie Sabe Lo Que Va a Pasar Mañana, with 176,000 SEA units being converted from a total of 239.56 million on-demand streams of the album's songs. On the issue date of May 4, 2024, Taylor Swift broke the record for the biggest streaming week for an album, with The Tortured Poets Department earning 683,000 SEA units from 891.37 million on-demand streams.

On the issue dated January 17, 2026, Billboard revised the ratios of SEA again, with one album unit equaling 2,500 ad-supported or 1,000 paid/subscription audio and video streams generated by songs from an album. Around the same time, YouTube stopped submitting streaming data to Billboard, due to their disagreement over the chart's weighting of paid and free streams. After a year of absence, YouTube data will return to Billboard charts on the issue dated January 16, 2027. At that point, the ratios of SEA will be adjusted, with one album unit constituting 1,500 ad-supported streams or 1,000 paid/subscription streams.

Streaming figure converted to 1 album unit
Effective date	Subscription/paid streams	Ad-supported/free streams
December 13, 2014	1,500	1,500
July 14, 2018	1,250	3,750
January 17, 2026	1,000	2,500
January 16, 2027	1,000	1,500

== Chart achievements ==
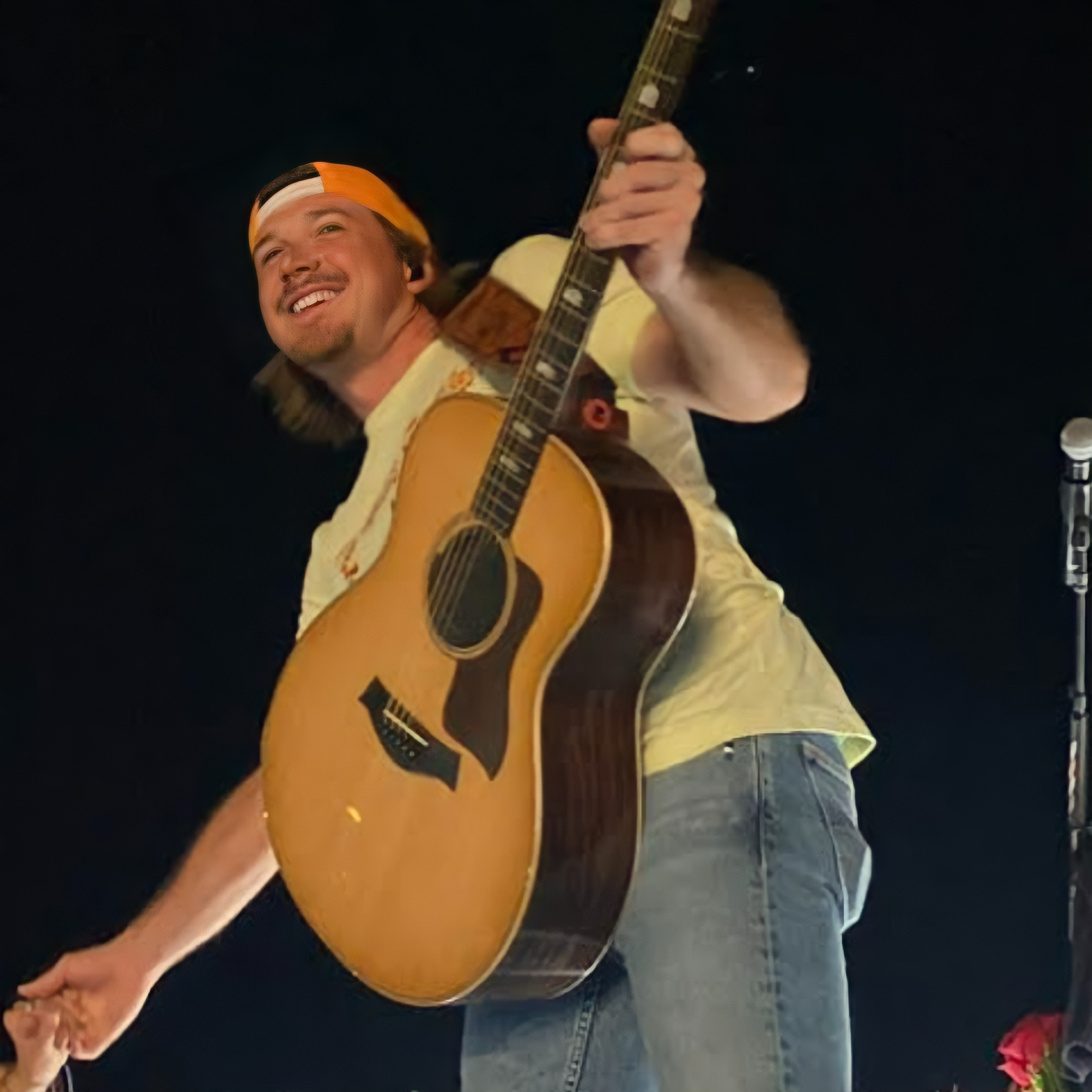
I'm the Problem (2025) by Morgan Wallen spent a record 29 weeks atop the Top Streaming Albums chart.

=== Artists with the most number ones ===
1. Future – 4 (tie)
1. Drake – 4 (tie)
2. Taylor Swift – 3
3. Bad Bunny – 2 (tie)
3. Kanye West – 2 (tie)
3. Morgan Wallen – 2 (tie)
3. Sabrina Carpenter – 2 (tie)
3. Zach Bryan – 2 (tie)

=== Albums with the most weeks at number one ===
- I'm the Problem (2025) by Morgan Wallen – 29 weeks
- The Tortured Poets Department (2024) by Taylor Swift – 11 weeks
- One Thing at a Time (2023) by Morgan Wallen – 9 weeks
- The Life of a Showgirl (2025) by Taylor Swift – 8 weeks
- Debí Tirar Más Fotos (2025) by Bad Bunny – 7 weeks
- You Seem Pretty Sad for a Girl So in Love (2026) by Olivia Rodrigo – 7 weeks
- Short n' Sweet (2024) by Sabrina Carpenter – 6 weeks
- SOS (2022) by SZA – 5 weeks
- GNX (2024) by Kendrick Lamar – 5 weeks

=== Albums with the most SEA units in a week ===
- The Tortured Poets Department (2024) by Taylor Swift – 683,000 units
- Certified Lover Boy (2021) by Drake – 562,000 units
- Scorpion (2018) by Drake – 551,000 units
- The Life of a Showgirl (2025) by Taylor Swift – 522,600 units
- Iceman (2026) by Drake – 449,000 units

== See also ==
- Official Albums Streaming Chart
- Streaming Songs
