= List of Top Album Sales number ones of the 2010s =

Top Album Sales is a music chart published by Billboard magazine documenting the best-selling albums on a weekly basis in the United States. Up until December 2014, this had been documented by the Billboard 200 chart, but that chart was altered to factor in music streaming by accounting for album-equivalent units in its tallies to document the effect of the rise of music streaming outlet such as Apple Music and Spotify. The Top Album Sales chart was created to preserve the older methodology of counting pure album sales.

== List of number-one albums ==
Key
†	Indicates the best-selling album of each year

=== 2014 ===
Issue date	Album	Artist(s)	Pure sales	Ref.
December 13	1989 †	Taylor Swift	281,000	
December 20	1989 †	Taylor Swift	230,000	
December 27	2014 Forest Hills Drive	J. Cole	353,000	

=== 2015 ===
Issue date	Album	Artist(s)	Pure sales	Ref.
January 3	1989	Taylor Swift	331,000	
January 10	1989	Taylor Swift	326,000	
January 17	1989	Taylor Swift	172,000	
January 24	1989	Taylor Swift	111,000	
January 31	Title	Meghan Trainor	195,000	
February 7	American Beauty/American Psycho	Fall Out Boy	192,000	
February 14	1989	Taylor Swift	71,000	
February 21	Now That's What I Call Music! 53	Various artists	99,000	
February 28	If You're Reading This It's Too Late	Drake	495,000	
March 7	Smoke + Mirrors	Imagine Dragons	172,000	
March 14	Dark Sky Paradise	Big Sean	139,000	
March 21	Piece by Piece	Kelly Clarkson	83,000	
March 28	Rebel Heart	Madonna	116,000	
April 4	To Pimp a Butterfly	Kendrick Lamar	324,000	
April 11	To Pimp a Butterfly	Kendrick Lamar	107,000	
April 18	The Album About Nothing	Wale	88,000	
April 25	Future Hearts	All Time Low	75,000	
May 2	Handwritten	Shawn Mendes	106,000	
May 9	Sound & Color	Alabama Shakes	91,000	
May 16	Jekyll + Hyde	Zac Brown Band	214,000	
May 23	Wilder Mind	Mumford and Sons	231,000	
May 30	Pitch Perfect 2	Soundtrack	92,000	
June 6	Blurryface	Twenty One Pilots	134,000	
June 13	At.Long.Last.ASAP	ASAP Rocky	117,000	
June 20	How Big How Blue How Beautiful	Florence + The Machine	128,000	
June 27	Drones	Muse	79,000	
July 4	Before This World	James Taylor	96,000	
July 11	Dark Before Dawn	Breaking Benjamin	135,000	
July 18	Dreams Worth More Than Money	Meek Mill	215,000	
July 25	Dreams Worth More Than Money	Meek Mill	251,000	
August 1	Black Rose	Tyrese	—N/a	
August 8	DS2	Future	126,000	
August 15	Woman	Jill Scott	58,000	
August 22	Descendants	Soundtrack	30,000	
August 29	Kill the Lights	Luke Bryan	320,000	
September 5	Kill the Lights	Luke Bryan	—N/a	
September 12	Immortalized	Disturbed	93,000	
September 19	Beauty Behind the Madness	The Weeknd	326,000	
September 26	Got Your Six	Five Finger Death Punch	114,000	
October 3	That's the Spirit	Bring Me the Horizon	55,000	
October 10	What a Time to Be Alive	Drake and Future	334,000	
October 17	Cass County	Don Henley	87,000	
October 24	Unbreakable	Janet Jackson	109,000	
October 31	Revival	Selena Gomez	86,000	
November 7	Pentatonix	Pentatonix	88,000	
November 14	Sounds Good Feels Good	5 Seconds of Summer	179,000	
November 21	Traveller	Chris Stapleton	153,000	
November 28	Traveller	Chris Stapleton	97,000	
December 5	Purpose	Justin Bieber	522,000	
December 12	25 †	Adele	3,380,000	
December 19	25 †	Adele	1,110,000	
December 26	25 †	Adele	695,000	

=== 2016 ===
Issue date	Album	Artist(s)	Pure sales	Ref.
January 2	25 †	Adele	790,000	
January 9	25 †	Adele	1,110,000	
January 16	25 †	Adele	307,000	
January 23	25 †	Adele	164,000	
January 30	Blackstar	David Bowie	174,000	
February 6	Death of a Bachelor	Panic! At the Disco	169,000	
February 13	25 †	Adele	97,000	
February 20	Anti	Rihanna	124,000	
February 27	25 †	Adele	124,000	
March 5	25 †	Adele	102,000	
March 12	25 †	Adele	81,000	
March 19	I Like It When You Sleep, for You Are So Beautiful yet So Unaware of It	The 1975	98,000	
March 26	Untitled Unmastered.	Kendrick Lamar	142,000	
April 2	Hymns That Are Important to Us	Joey + Rory	44,000	
April 9	This Is What the Truth Feels Like	Gwen Stefani	76,000	
April 16	Mind of Mine	Zayn	112,000	
April 23	Traveller	Chris Stapleton	59,000	
April 30	Cleopatra	The Lumineers	108,000	
May 7	The Very Best of Prince	Prince	100,000	
May 14	Lemonade	Beyoncé	485,000	
May 21	Views	Drake	852,000	
May 28	Views	Drake	175,000	
June 4	Lemonade	Beyoncé	92,000	
June 11	If I'm Honest	Blake Shelton	153,000	
June 18	Black	Dierks Bentley	88,000	
June 25	Stranger to Stranger	Paul Simon	67,000	
July 2	Last Year Was Complicated	Nick Jonas	47,000	
July 9	The Getaway	Red Hot Chili Peppers	108,000	
July 16	True Sadness	The Avett Brothers	43,000	
July 23	California	Blink 182	172,000	
July 30	Blank Face LP	Schoolboy Q	52,000	
August 6	Hard Love	Needtobreathe	46,000	
August 13	Everybody Looking	Gucci Mane	43,000	
August 20	Major Key	DJ Khaled	59,000	
August 27	Suicide Squad: The Album	Soundtrack	128,000	
September 3	Suicide Squad: The Album	Soundtrack	50,000	
September 10	Blonde	Frank Ocean	232,000	
September 17	Encore: Movie Partners Sing Broadway	Barbra Streisand	148,000	
September 24	Bad Vibrations	A Day to Remember	62,000	
October 1	They Don't Know	Jason Aldean	131,000	
October 8	Sinner	Aaron Lewis	39,000	
October 15	Illuminate	Shawn Mendes	121,000	
October 22	22, A Million	Bon Iver	58,000	
October 29	Revolution Radio	Green Day	90,000	
November 5	Walls	Kings of Leon	68,000	
November 12	Joanne	Lady Gaga	170,000	
November 19	Cosmic Hallelujah	Kenny Chesney	79,000	
November 26	This House Is Not for Sale	Bon Jovi	128,000	
December 3	We Got It from Here... Thank You 4 Your Service	A Tribe Called Quest	112,000	
December 10	Hardwired... to Self-Destruct	Metallica	282,000	
December 17	Starboy	The Weeknd	209,000	
December 24	The Hamilton Mixtape	Various artists	169,000	
December 31	4 Your Eyez Only	J. Cole	363,000	

=== 2017 ===
Issue date	Album	Artist(s)	Pure sales	Ref.
January 7	A Pentatonix Christmas	Pentatonix	185,000	
January 14	A Pentatonix Christmas	Pentatonix	82,000	
January 21	Moana	Soundtrack	44,000	
January 28	La La Land	Soundtrack	30,000	
February 4	I See You	The xx	36,000	
February 11	The Search for Everything: Wave One	John Mayer	38,000	
February 18	The Devil Don't Sleep	Brantley Gilbert	66,000	
February 25	I Decided.	Big Sean	65,000	
March 4	Fifty Shades Darker	Soundtrack	72,000	
March 11	Future	Future	60,000	
March 18	HNDRXX	Future	48,000	
March 25	÷ (Divide)	Ed Sheeran	322,000	
April 1	Hardwired... to Self-Destruct	Metallica	100,000	
April 8	More Life	Drake	226,000	
April 15	Hardwired... to Self-Destruct	Metallica	48,000	
April 22	Emperor of Sand	Mastodon	41,000	
April 29	Memories...Do Not Open	The Chainsmokers	166,000	
May 6	Damn	Kendrick Lamar	353,000	
May 13	Damn	Kendrick Lamar	89,000	
May 20	Humanz	Gorillaz	115,000	
May 27	From a Room: Volume 1	Chris Stapleton	202,000	
June 3	Harry Styles	Harry Styles	193,000	
June 10	One More Light	Linkin Park	100,000	
June 17	Sgt. Pepper's Lonely Hearts Club Band	The Beatles	71,000	
June 24	Hopeless Fountain Kingdom	Halsey	76,000	
July 1	Witness	Katy Perry	162,000	
July 8	Melodrama	Lorde	82,000	
July 15	Evolve	Imagine Dragons	109,000	
July 22	Hydrograd	Stone Sour	30,000	
July 29	4:44	Jay-Z	174,000	
August 5	4:44	Jay-Z	61,000	
August 12	Lust for Life	Lana Del Rey	80,000	
August 19	Everything Now	Arcade Fire	94,000	
August 26	Brett Eldredge	Brett Eldredge	36,000	
September 2	Rainbow	Kesha	90,000	
September 9	Science Fiction	Brand New	55,000	
September 16	Villain	Queens of the Stone Age	69,000	
September 23	American Dream	LCD Soundsystem	81,000	
September 30	Life Changes	Thomas Rhett	94,000	
October 7	Concrete and Gold	Foo Fighters	120,000	
October 14	Wonderful Wonderful	The Killers	111,000	
October 21	Now	Shania Twain	134,000	
October 28	Perception	NF	38,000	
November 4	Beautiful Trauma	Pink	384,000	
November 11	Flicker	Niall Horan	128,000	
November 18	Live in No Shoes Nation	Kenny Chesney	217,000	
November 25	The Thrill of It All	Sam Smith	185,000	
December 2	Reputation †	Taylor Swift	1,216,000	
December 9	Reputation †	Taylor Swift	232,000	
December 16	Reputation †	Taylor Swift	131,000	
December 23	Songs of Experience	U2	180,000	
December 30	What Makes You Country	Luke Bryan	99,000	

=== 2018 ===
Issue date	Album	Artist(s)	Pure sales	Ref.
January 3	Revival	Eminem	197,000	
January 6	Reputation	Taylor Swift	79,000	
January 13	The Greatest Showman †	Soundtrack	78,000	
January 20	The Greatest Showman †	Soundtrack	70,000	
January 27	The Greatest Showman †	Soundtrack	70,000	
February 3	Mania	Fall Out Boy	117,000	
February 10	The Greatest Showman †	Soundtrack	—N/a	
February 17	Man of the Woods	Justin Timberlake	242,000	
February 24	Man of the Woods	Justin Timberlake	—N/a	
March 3	By the Way, I Forgive You	Brandi Carlile	41,000	
March 10	This House Is Not for Sale	Bon Jovi	120,000	
March 17	The Greatest Showman †	Soundtrack	—N/a	
March 24	American Utopia	David Byrne	63,000	
March 31	Hardwired...To Self-Destruct	Metallica	63,000	
April 7	Boarding House Reach	Jack White	121,000	
April 14	My Dear Melancholy	The Weeknd	68,000	
April 21	Invasion of Privacy	Cardi B	103,000	
April 28	Rearview Town	Jason Aldean	162,000	
May 5	KOD	J. Cole	174,000	
May 12	Beerbongs & Bentleys	Post Malone	153,000	
May 19	Good Thing	Leon Bridges	59,000	
May 26	Beautiful Trauma	Pink	135,000	
June 2	Love Yourself: Tear	BTS	100,000	
June 9	Shawn Mendes	Shawn Mendes	142,000	
June 16	Ye	Kanye West	85,000	
June 23	Come Tomorrow	Dave Matthews Band	285,000	
June 30	Youngblood	5 Seconds of Summer	117,000	
July 7	Pray for the Wicked	Panic! at the Disco	151,000	
July 14	Scorpion	Drake	160,000	
July 21	Scorpion	Drake	29,000	
July 28	Scorpion	Drake	29,000	
August 4	Mamma Mia! Here We Go Again: The Movie Soundtrack	Soundtrack	34,000	
August 11	Songs for the Saints	Kenny Chesney	65,000	
August 18	Astroworld	Travis Scott	270,000	
August 25	Astroworld	Travis Scott	78,000	
September 1	Sweetener	Ariana Grande	127,000	
September 8	Love Yourself: Answer	BTS	141,000	
September 15	Kamikaze	Eminem	225,000	
September 22	Egypt Station	Paul McCartney	147,000	
September 29	Cry Pretty	Carrie Underwood	251,000	
October 6	Bridge	Josh Groban	94,000	
October 13	Dancing Queen	Cher	150,000	
October 20	A Star Is Born	Lady Gaga and Bradley Cooper	162,000	
October 27	A Star Is Born	Lady Gaga and Bradley Cooper	86,000	
November 3	Anthem of the Peaceful Army	Greta Van Fleet	80,000	
November 10	Si	Andrea Bocelli	123,000	
November 17	A Star Is Born	Lady Gaga and Bradley Cooper	—N/a	
November 24	Experiment	Kane Brown	105,000	
December 1	Delta	Mumford and Sons	214,000	
December 8	Love	Michael Buble	105,000	
December 15	A Brief Inquiry into Online Relationships	The 1975	48,000	
December 22	Skins	XXXTentacion	52,000	
December 29	A Star Is Born	Lady Gaga and Bradley Cooper	—N/a	

=== 2019 ===
Issue date	Album	Artist(s)	Pure sales	Ref.
January 5	A Star Is Born	Lady Gaga and Bradley Cooper	—N/a	
January 12	The Greatest Showman	Soundtrack	—N/a	
January 19	A Star Is Born	Lady Gaga and Bradley Cooper	—N/a	
January 26	A Star Is Born	Lady Gaga and Bradley Cooper	—N/a	
February 2	Heard It in a Past Life	Maggie Rogers	37,000	
February 9	DNA	Backstreet Boys	227,000	
February 16	A Star Is Born	Lady Gaga and Bradley Cooper	—N/a	
February 23	Thank U, Next	Ariana Grande	116,000	
March 2	Bohemian Rhapsody: The Original Soundtrack	Queen	—N/a	
March 9	A Star Is Born	Lady Gaga and Bradley Cooper	77,000	
March 16	Wasteland, Baby!	Hozier	75,000	
March 23	Death Race for Love	Juice Wrld	43,000	
March 30	A Star Is Born	Lady Gaga and Bradley Cooper	—N/a	
April 6	?	XXXTentacion	—N/a	
April 13	When We All Fall Asleep, Where Do We Go?	Billie Eilish	170,000	
April 20	Free Spirit	Khalid	85,000	
April 27	Map of the Soul: Persona	BTS	196,000	
May 4	Map of the Soul: Persona	BTS	—N/a	
May 11	People	Hillsong United	101,000	
May 18	Father of the Bride	Vampire Weekend	119,000	
May 25	Space Between	Sammy Hagar & The Circle	40,000	
June 1	Igor	Tyler the Creator	74,000	
June 8	We Are Superhuman	NCT 127	25,000	
June 15	Center Point Road	Thomas Rhett	45,000	
June 22	Happiness Begins	Jonas Brothers	357,000	
June 29	Madame X	Madonna	90,000	
July 6	Help Us Stranger	The Raconteurs	84,000	
July 13	Let's Rock	The Black Keys	41,000	
July 20	Revenge of the Dreamers III	Dreamville and J. Cole	24,000	
July 27	No. 6 Collaborations Project	Ed Sheeran	70,000	
August 3	No. 6 Collaborations Project	Ed Sheeran	16,000	
August 10	The Search	NF	84,000	
August 17	Country Squire	Tyler Childers	24,000	
August 24	We Are Not Your Kind	Slipknot	102,000	
August 31	Hello From Las Vegas	Lionel Richie	65,000	
September 7	Lover †	Taylor Swift	679,000	
September 14	Fear Inoculum	Tool	248,000	
September 21	Hollywood's Bleeding	Post Malone	200,000	
September 28	III	The Lumineers	73,000	
October 5	The Owl	Zac Brown Band	99,000	
October 12	Abbey Road	The Beatles	70,000	
October 19	SuperM	SuperM	164,000	
October 26	SuperM	SuperM	—N/a	
November 2	Walk the Sky	Alter Bridge	—N/a	
November 9	Jesus Is King	Kanye West	109,000	
November 16	Wildcard	Miranda Lambert	44,000	
November 23	What You See Is What You Get	Luke Combs	109,000	
November 30	Courage	Celine Dion	109,000	
December 7	9	Jason Aldean	68,000	
December 14	Frozen 2	Soundtrack	37,000	
December 21	Who	The Who	88,000	
December 28	Fine Line	Harry Styles	393,000	
