= We Can't Be Friends (Wait for Your Love) =

2024 single by Ariana Grande

Single by Ariana Grande

from the album Eternal Sunshine
- B-side: "Imperfect for You"
- Released: March 8, 2024
- Recorded: September 2023
- Studio: Jungle City (New York City)
- Genre: Europop; power pop; synth-pop; synthwave
- Length: 3:48
- Label: Republic
- Songwriters: Ariana Grande; Max Martin; Ilya Salmanzadeh
- Producers: Ariana Grande; Max Martin; Ilya

Ariana Grande singles chronology
"Yes, And?" (2024)	"We Can't Be Friends (Wait for Your Love)" (2024)	"The Boy Is Mine" (2024)

Music video
- "We Can't Be Friends (Wait for Your Love)" on YouTube

"We Can't Be Friends (Wait for Your Love)" is a song by American singer-songwriter Ariana Grande. It was released through Republic Records on March 8, 2024, as the second single from her seventh studio album, Eternal Sunshine (2024). It is written and produced by Grande, Max Martin and Ilya Salmanzadeh. Built on an electropop beat, "We Can't Be Friends (Wait for Your Love)" is a Europop, power pop, synth-pop, and synthwave song. The song's lyrics dually refer to the demise of a romantic relationship as well as Grande's relationship with the press.

The song was met positively by music critics and debuted atop the US Billboard Hot 100, marking Grande's ninth number-one single and her second from Eternal Sunshine after "Yes, And?". The song marked her seventh number-one debut, making her the female artist with the most number-one debuts in history, as well as her 22nd top-ten on the chart. It earned Grande her fourth number-one single on the Billboard Global 200 chart and reached number one in 12 countries in places like Indonesia, Malaysia, New Zealand, Philippines, Singapore, and the United Arab Emirates. Elsewhere, the song peaked within the top ten in 22 other countries, including Australia, Ireland, Lithuania, the Netherlands, Norway, Switzerland and the United Kingdom.

An accompanying music video for "We Can't Be Friends (Wait for Your Love)", directed by Christian Breslauer, was released simultaneously with the single. The concept for the video was inspired by the plot of the 2004 film Eternal Sunshine of the Spotless Mind and features Grande undergoing a memory erasure procedure to forget her ex-boyfriend, who is portrayed by American actor Evan Peters. The song garnered five nominations at the 2024 MTV Video Music Awards, including Video of the Year; it won Best Cinematography. To promote the single, Grande performed it on Saturday Night Live and at the 2024 Met Gala.

== Background and release ==
The tracklist for Eternal Sunshine was not revealed entirely at once; instead partially on different days until the full tracklist was unveiled. Grande announced three track titles on February 7, 2024; "We Can't Be Friends (Wait for Your Love)" was revealed as the tenth track of the album. Also in February, the singer announced that there would be no more pre-release singles from Eternal Sunshine, as she wanted her fans to "experience it in full this time". However, she confirmed "more singles" would be issued after the album was released.

On March 1, Grande confirmed "We Can't Be Friends (Wait for Your Love)" was the second single from the album and posted a teaser for its music video on social media. In the clip, Grande sits in a waiting room and fills out a consent form reading, "You have given extensive thought behind your decision and give 'Brighter Days Inc.' the exclusive permission to remove this person completely from your memory." The singer puts a check mark next to "Yes" and then signs her name as "Peaches" with a heart on the contract line.

Republic Records released Eternal Sunshine on March 8, 2024; "We Can't Be Friends (Wait for Your Love)" is the tenth track on the album. The song was released as the second single in tandem with the album's release, following "Yes, And?". Three alternative versions of "We Can't Be Friends (Wait for Your Love)" were released on March 13, exclusively for download: a cappella, instrumental, and strings. In May, June, and July, the standard and alternative versions of the song were issued via CD, cassette, and 7-inch vinyl. An instrumental strings version of the track, grouped with the pre-released standard and alternative versions, was released in July, as part of a digital bundle via download and EP on streaming services. On September 8, 2024, to celebrate the six-month anniversary of the release of Eternal Sunshine, Grande surprise-released a live acoustic version of the song, recorded at Jungle City Studios. On December 2, 2025, the single was released as a Target exclusive 4-inch vinyl.

== Composition ==
"We Can't Be Friends (Wait for Your Love)" is a synth-pop, Europop, power pop, and synthwave ballad with an electropop beat. Its lyrics outwardly detail the demise of a relationship with the hope that an ex-lover will return and fall in love again. It has been speculated by fans and the media that the song describes Grande's symbiotic relationship with the press and its unsubstantiated reporting on her personal life; the lyrics have been interpreted to describe her choice to not engage with a cyclical nature of acclaim and criticism directed towards her.

== Critical reception ==
Laura Snapes of The Guardian wrote that the song evokes "Call Your Girlfriend" by Robyn's "juddering synths and chiptune flourishes" with a final "jarringly retro" effect. Erica Gonzales & Samuel Maude of Elle magazine stated that the song giving "big Robyn vibes, big "Dancing On My Own" vibes" from the song and called it a coming-of-age pop song.

Kyle Denis of Billboard described the song as "a dancefloor-quaking amalgam of dizzying strings and aggressive synths" wherein Grande sings about "the fuzzying of the boundaries between friendship, romance and the aching gray in between", pointing out that "it is missing a climax to really achieve the catharsis that its urgent instrumental gestures toward".

Critics' year-end rankings of "We Can't Be Friends (Wait for Your Love)"
Publication	List	Rank	Ref.
NPR	124 Best Songs of 2024	—N/a	

== Commercial performance ==
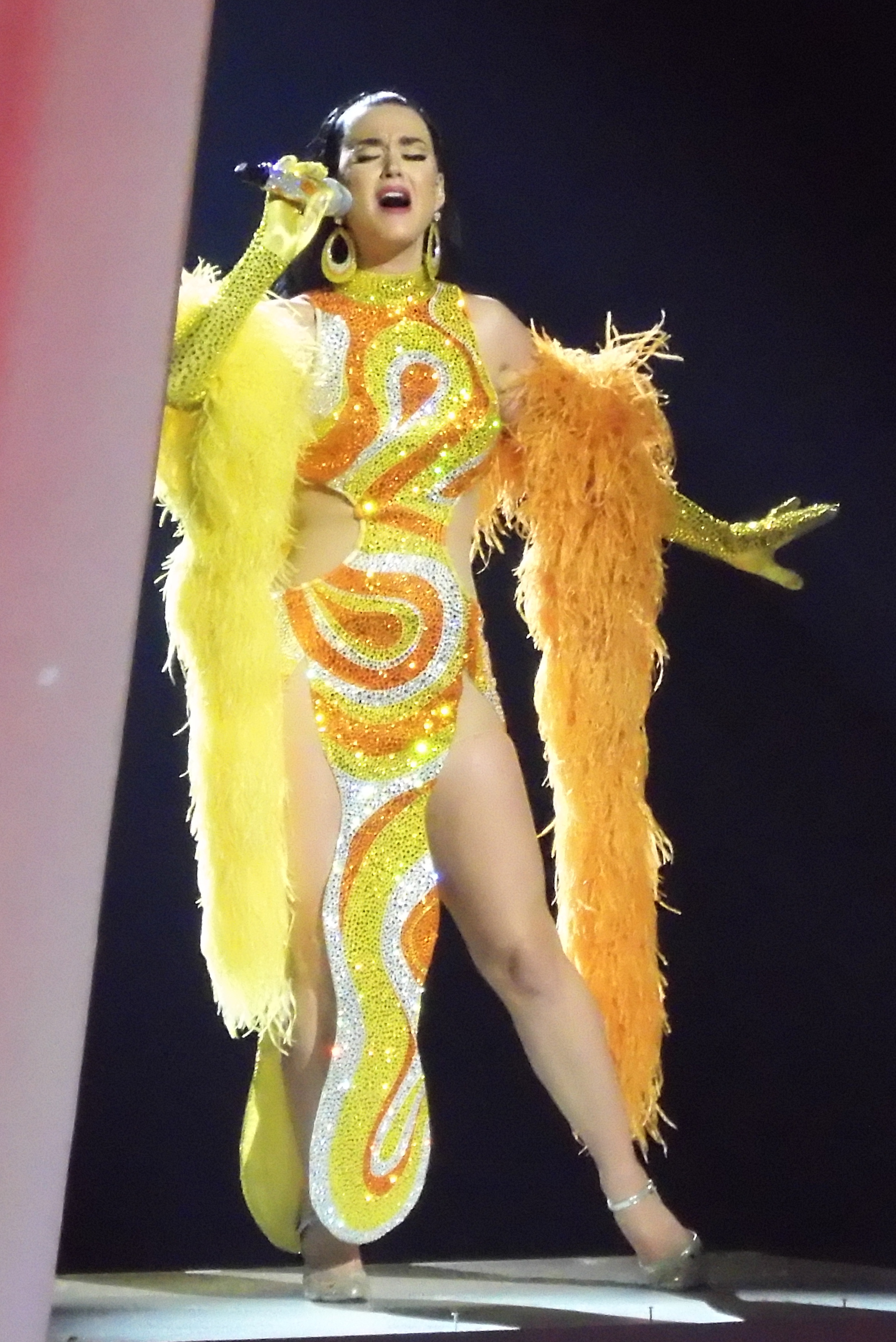
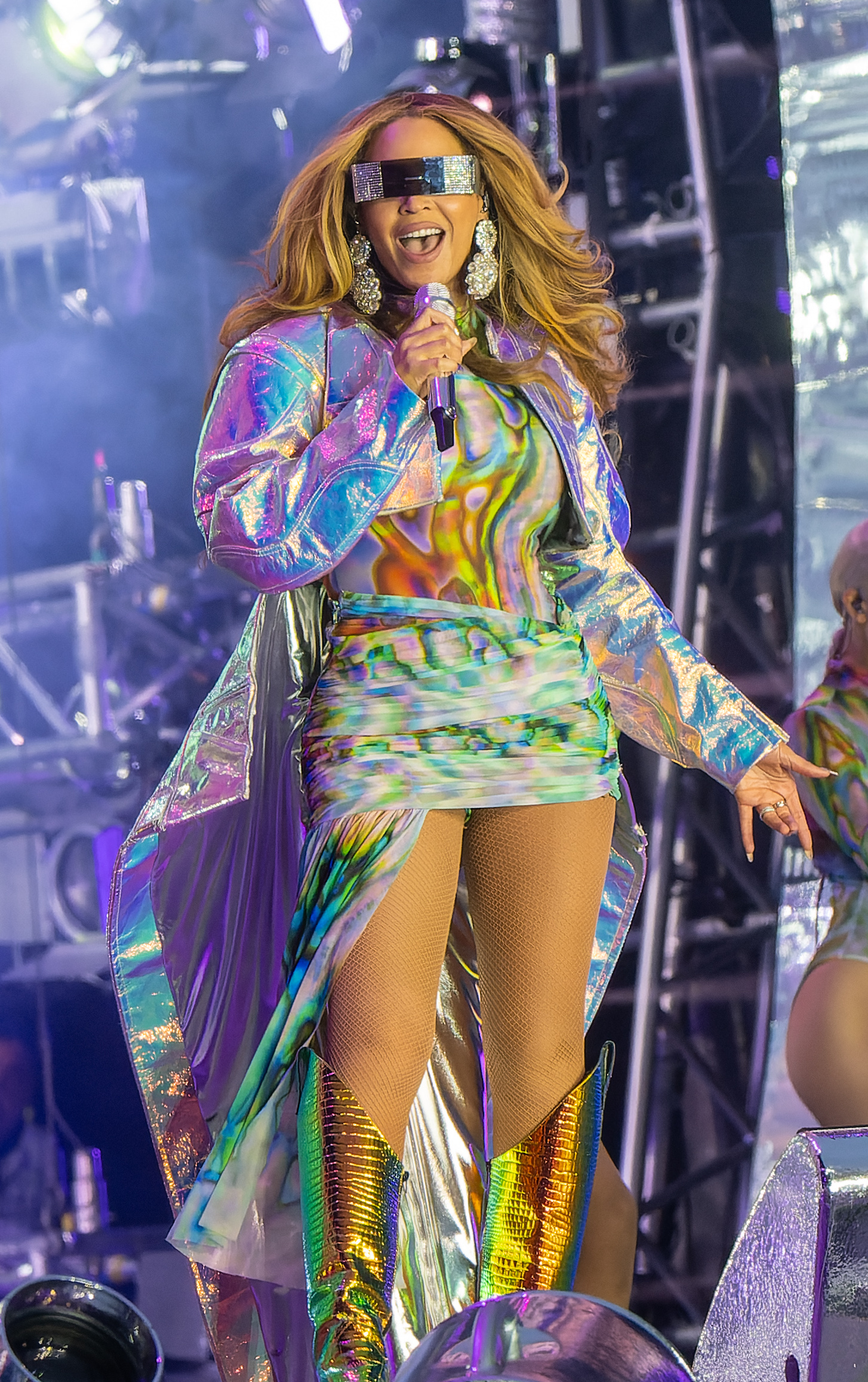
Grande achieved her ninth number-one single in the US, tying Katy Perry (left) and Beyoncé (right) for the seventh-most number ones among solo women.

"We Can't Be Friends (Wait for Your Love)" debuted at number one on both the Billboard Global 200 and the Global Excl. U.S. charts dated March 23, 2024. It marked her second consecutive single from the album Eternal Sunshine to top both charts after "Yes, And?" did so in January. On the Global 200, it became her fourth number-one single after "Positions" (2020), "Save Your Tears" (2021), and "Yes, And?". The song opened with 97.5 million streams and 14,000 sold worldwide, outpacing the streaming start of "Yes, And?", which drew 94.4 million globally. On the Global Excl. U.S., it became her third number-one single after "Positions" and "Yes, And?", and achieved 65.5 million streams and 5,000 sold outside the US. On Luminate's 2024 midyear music report, "We Can't Be Friends (Wait for Your Love)" ranked as the ninth most-streamed song of the year worldwide by overall on-demand audio streaming volume, achieving 826 million streams between January 1 and July 1, 2024.

In the United States, "We Can't Be Friends (Wait for Your Love)" debuted at number one on the Billboard Hot 100 for the chart issue dated March 23, 2024. It became Grande's ninth overall number-one single on the chart, fourth consecutive following the remixes of "Save Your Tears" (2021) and "Die for You" (2023) as well as "Yes, And?", and her second consecutive from the album Eternal Sunshine, following the chart-topping debut of "Yes, And?" earlier in January. With this, Grande tied Katy Perry and Beyoncé for the seventh-most Hot 100 number-ones among solo women. "We Can't Be Friends (Wait for Your Love)" was also her seventh career single to debut at the top of the Hot 100, leading Grande to surpass Taylor Swift as the female artist with the most number-one debuts. She additionally became the artist with the second-most number-one debuts in history, only trailing Drake's nine. "We Can't Be Friends (Wait for Your Love)" debuted at the top slot of the Billboard Streaming Songs chart with 32.6 million streams, outpacing the debut week of "Yes, And?" and earning Grande her sixth chart-topper there. It also debuted at number four on the Billboard Digital Songs chart with 9,000 units sold, and earned 4.6 million radio airplay audience impressions in its opening week. Additionally, the song marked the first time Grande topped the Hot 100 with two singles from the same album since Thank U, Next (2019) spawned two number-one singles with its title track and "7 Rings". With this, Grande became the first woman artist in history to have two albums produce multiple number-one debuts. "We Can't Be Friends (Wait for Your Love)" charted for 24 weeks on the Hot 100, before going recurrent and departing the chart in the first issue of September. It was the seventh-most-streamed song globally on Deezer in 2024.

== Music video ==
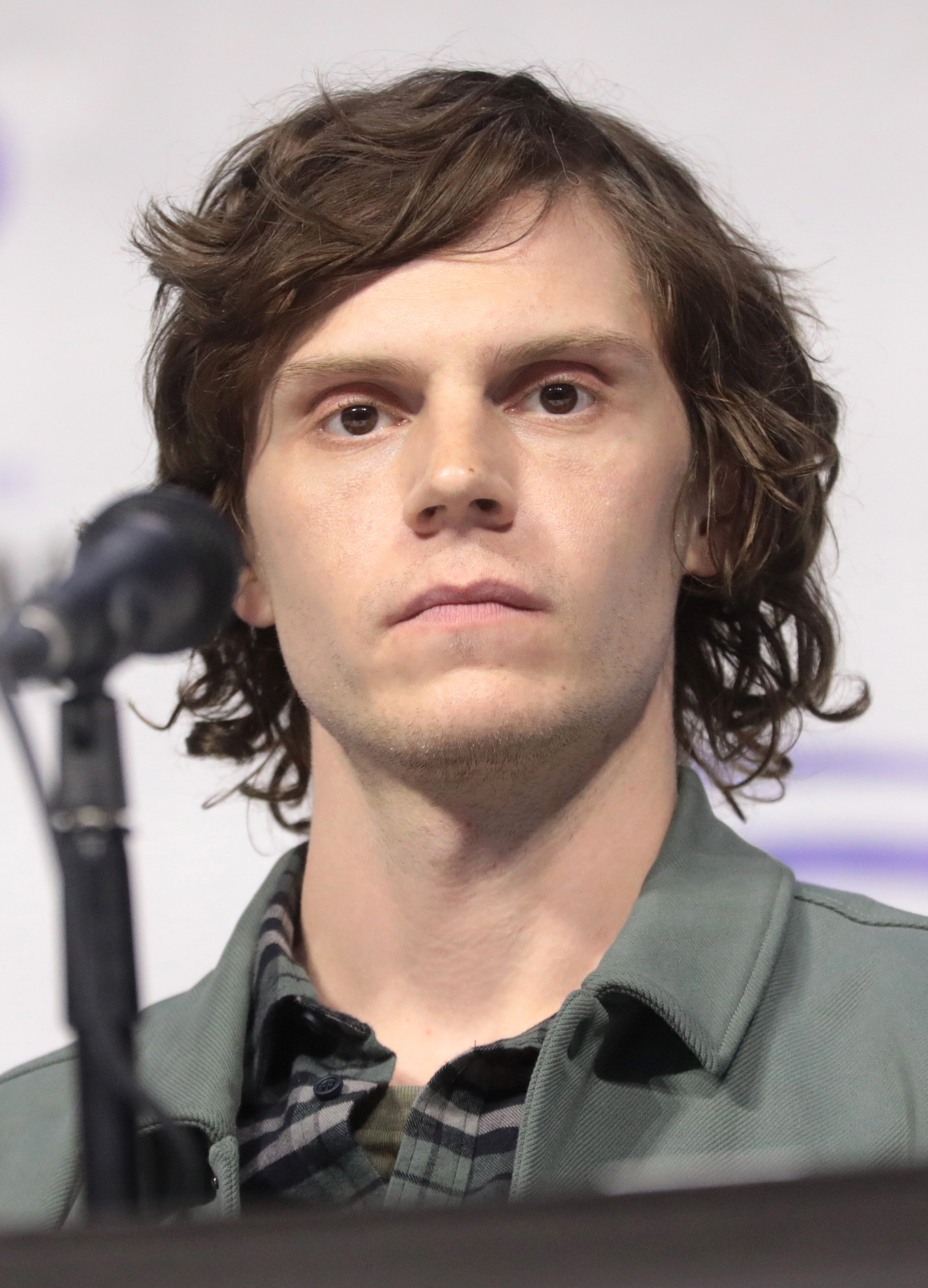
Evan Peters starred in the music video for "We Can't Be Friends (Wait for Your Love)".

The music video for "We Can't Be Friends (Wait for Your Love)" is directed by Christian Breslauer. It was filmed on the south campus grounds of the California Polytechnic State University located in the city of Pomona, California. It premiered via Grande's Vevo channel on YouTube at 10:00 Eastern Daylight Time (EDT) on March 8, 2024, ten hours after the song's and album's release. The concept of the visual is heavily inspired by the plot of the film Eternal Sunshine of the Spotless Mind (2004); it was described by Grande as "[Eternal Sunshine] in a video".

Grande portrays a character named Peaches while Evan Peters plays as her ex-boyfriend in the video. Several scenes from Eternal Sunshine of the Spotless Mind are referenced in the video, while a reference to a Sixteen Candles (1984) scene is made as well. Billboard called the video "futuristic".

=== Synopsis ===
The video opens with Grande portraying a character named Peaches, seen sitting in a waiting room holding a consent form reading: "You have given extensive thought behind your decision and give 'Brighter Days Inc.' the exclusive permission to remove this person completely from your memory". Peaches reluctantly ticks a box labeled 'yes' and signs the form. A doctor enters the waiting room to call Peaches for her treatment. She gives the doctor her consent form and carries a box of belongings with her to the room. Peaches is then shown seated and about to begin her procedure. The doctor takes a teddy bear from the box and uses a device to remove it from existence and from Peaches' memory. How the teddy bear came to be and its link to Peaches's relationship with her ex-boyfriend is then shown as the wall of the operation room divides into two and shows them both entering an arcade. They approach a claw game and are seen winning the teddy bear. Suddenly, the arcade goes dark and her ex-boyfriend disappears from the memory.

Shifting to a bedroom, Peaches is seen sitting on a bed looking towards her ex-boyfriend whilst he is frowning, turned away from her. The scene shifts once again, this time to a different memory where she is seen opening a door leading her to see them both lying in the snow creating snow angels. The scene ends again with her ex-boyfriend disappearing from the memory. Peaches is seen next holding hands with her ex-boyfriend in a bed under a blanket. The bed is divided into two and the pair are separated, leaving her alone under the blanket.

Back in the operation room, in the belongings, a framed picture of the couple celebrating Peaches's birthday with a cake can be seen. They lean towards each other and her ex-boyfriend disappears to Peaches's surprise. Now alone, she blows out the candles on the cake before the scene returns to the operation room. Peaches gains consciousness and becomes emotional. Another memory is shown where she and her ex-boyfriend are together on a sofa. He gives her a necklace but the memory alters with the necklace morphing into a dog collar and her ex-boyfriend being replaced with a dog. The living room also alters, with picture frames and other decor transforming to omit every memory of the couple. Peaches and her dog watch the TV in the room and a final montage of each of the memories is played. The scene cuts back to the operation room where Peaches is seen shaking hands and hugging the doctors involved with her treatment. Her box of belongings is then shown to be incinerated. After leaving the operation room, Peaches walks with a man past her ex-boyfriend, who is seen also walking with a girl, unaware of each other's existence.

== Live performances ==
On March 9, 2024, Grande appeared as the musical guest on Saturday Night Live. She performed "We Can't Be Friends (Wait for Your Love)" live for the first time, alongside "Imperfect for You", also from Eternal Sunshine. As the surprise performer at the 2024 Met Gala, Grande performed the song along with "Yes, And?", "The Boy Is Mine", and others.

== Track listing ==
Streaming/digital download – single

1. "We Can't Be Friends (Wait for Your Love)" – 3:48
2. "We Can't Be Friends (Wait for Your Love)" (a capella) – 3:32
3. "We Can't Be Friends (Wait for Your Love)" (instrumental) – 3:48
4. "We Can't Be Friends (Wait for Your Love)" (string version) – 3:42
5. "We Can't Be Friends (Wait for Your Love)" (string version instrumental) – 3:42

Streaming/digital download – acoustic (live from Jungle City Studios)

1. "We Can't Be Friends (Wait for Your Love)" (acoustic; live from Jungle City Studios) – 3:07

4-inch vinyl

1. "We Can't Be Friends (Wait for Your Love)" – 3:48
2. "Imperfect for You" – 3:02

== Accolades ==
'We Can't Be Friends (Wait For Your Love)" was expected by various critics and publications to receive nominations for Record of the Year and Song of the Year at the 67th Annual Grammy Awards. Upon the song receiving no nominations at all, Grande was named one of the biggest snubs of the ceremony by several publications.

Awards and nominations for "We Can't Be Friends (Wait For Your Love)"
Organization	Year	Category	Result	Ref.
MTV Video Music Awards	2024	Video of the Year	Nominated	
MTV Video Music Awards	2024	Best Direction	Nominated	
MTV Video Music Awards	2024	Best Cinematography	Won	
MTV Video Music Awards	2024	Best Editing	Nominated	
MTV Video Music Awards	2024	Song of Summer	Nominated	
MTV Europe Music Awards	2024	Best Song	Nominated	
MTV Europe Music Awards	2024	Best Video	Nominated	
Myx Music Awards	2024	Global Video of the Year	Nominated	
RTHK International Pop Poll Awards	2024	Top Ten International Gold Songs	Nominated	
SESAC Music Awards	2024	Performance Award	Won	
ASCAP Pop Music Awards	2025	Most Performed Songs	Won	
Hit FM Music Awards (Note: The Hit FM Music Awards was established in 2008 to honor Western pop music in China.)	2025	Top Ten Singles	Won	
iHeartRadio Music Awards	2025	Best Lyrics	Nominated	
Music Awards Japan	2025	Best International R&B/Contemporary Song in Japan	Won	

== Charts ==
=== Weekly charts ===
Weekly chart performance
Chart (2024–2025)	Peak position
Argentina Hot 100 (Billboard)	67
Australia (ARIA)	2
Austria (Ö3 Austria Top 40)	12
Belarus Airplay (TopHit)	5
Belgium (Ultratop 50 Flanders)	29
Belgium (Ultratop 50 Wallonia)	13
Brazil Hot 100 (Billboard)	16
Canada Hot 100 (Billboard)	3
Canada AC (Billboard)	18
Canada CHR/Top 40 (Billboard)	2
Canada Hot AC (Billboard)	7
Chile (Monitor Latino)	16
CIS Airplay (TopHit)	4
Croatia International Airplay (Top lista)	18
Czech Republic Singles Digital (ČNS IFPI)	18
Denmark (Tracklisten)	4
El Salvador Airplay (Monitor Latino)	13
Estonia Airplay (TopHit)	3
Finland (Suomen virallinen lista)	23
France (SNEP)	22
Germany (GfK)	22
Global 200 (Billboard)	1
Greece International Streaming (IFPI)	2
Hong Kong (Billboard)	16
Hungary (Rádiós Top 40)	4
Iceland (Tónlistinn)	2
India International Streaming (IMI)	10
Indonesia (Billboard)	1
Ireland (IRMA)	3
Israel (Mako Hitlist)	20
Italy (FIMI)	56
Japan Hot Overseas (Billboard Japan)	2
Kazakhstan Airplay (TopHit)	2
Latvia (LAIPA)	8
Lebanon (Lebanese Top 20)	2
Lithuania (AGATA)	6
Luxembourg (Billboard)	5
Malaysia (RIM)	1
Middle East and North Africa (IFPI)	2
Mexico (Billboard)	22
Moldova Airplay (TopHit)	152
Netherlands (Dutch Top 40)	20
Netherlands (Single Top 100)	8
New Zealand (Recorded Music NZ)	1
Nigeria (TurnTable Top 100)	34
Norway (VG-lista)	3
Panama (PRODUCE)	48
Paraguay (Monitor Latino)	16
Peru (Billboard)	13
Philippines (Philippines Hot 100)	11
Poland (Polish Airplay Top 100)	6
Poland (Polish Streaming Top 100)	10
Portugal (AFP)	8
Romania (Billboard)	22
Russia Airplay (TopHit)	2
Saudi Arabia (IFPI)	2
Serbia Airplay (Radiomonitor)	17
Singapore (RIAS)	1
Slovakia Airplay (ČNS IFPI)	16
Slovakia Singles Digital (ČNS IFPI)	14
South Africa Streaming (TOSAC)	10
South Korea (Circle)	154
Spain (PROMUSICAE)	21
Sweden (Sverigetopplistan)	6
Switzerland (Schweizer Hitparade)	7
Taiwan (Billboard)	17
UK Singles (Official Charts)	2
Ukraine Airplay (TopHit)	58
United Arab Emirates (IFPI)	1
US Billboard Hot 100	1
US Adult Contemporary (Billboard)	24
US Adult Pop Airplay (Billboard)	5
US Dance Airplay (Billboard)	14
US Pop Airplay (Billboard)	1
Venezuela Airplay (Record Report)	33

=== Monthly charts ===
Monthly chart performance
Chart (2024)	Peak position
Belarus Airplay (TopHit)	8
Brazil Streaming (Pro-Música Brasil)	45
CIS Airplay (TopHit)	4
Czech Republic (Singles Digitál – Top 100)	50
Estonia Airplay (TopHit)	6
Kazakhstan Airplay (TopHit)	3
Lithuania Airplay (TopHit)	8
Paraguay (SGP)	51
Russia Airplay (TopHit)	4
Slovakia (Rádio – Top 100)	21
Slovakia (Singles Digitál – Top 100)	31
Ukraine Airplay (TopHit)	60

=== Year-end charts ===
Year-end chart performance
Chart (2024)	Position
Australia (ARIA)	26
Belarus Airplay (TopHit)	28
Belgium (Ultratop 50 Flanders)	89
Belgium (Ultratop 50 Wallonia)	51
Canada (Canadian Hot 100)	20
CIS Airplay (TopHit)	18
Denmark (Tracklisten)	55
Estonia Airplay (TopHit)	34
France (SNEP)	199
Global 200 (Billboard)	22
Global Singles (IFPI)	20
Iceland (Tónlistinn)	27
Kazakhstan Airplay (TopHit)	19
Lithuania Airplay (TopHit)	18
Netherlands (Single Top 100)	67
New Zealand (Recorded Music NZ)	25
Philippines (Philippines Hot 100)	9
Poland (Polish Airplay Top 100)	91
Portugal (AFP)	70
Russia Airplay (TopHit)	17
Sweden (Sverigetopplistan)	60
Switzerland (Schweizer Hitparade)	67
UK Singles (Official Charts)	24
US Billboard Hot 100	26
US Adult Pop Airplay (Billboard)	21
US Pop Airplay (Billboard)	15
Venezuela Anglo (Record Report)	3

Year-end chart performance
Chart (2025)	Position
Australia (ARIA)	71
Global 200 (Billboard)	46
Hungary (Rádiós Top 40)	29
Lithuania Airplay (TopHit)	132
Philippines (Philippines Hot 100)	38

== Certifications ==
Certifications
Region	Certification	Certified units/sales
Australia (ARIA)	5× Platinum	350,000^{‡}
Austria (IFPI Austria)	Platinum	30,000^{‡}
Belgium (BRMA)	Platinum	40,000^{‡}
Brazil (Pro-Música Brasil)	3× Diamond	480,000^{‡}
Canada (Music Canada)	4× Platinum	320,000^{‡}
Denmark (IFPI Danmark)	Platinum	90,000^{‡}
France (SNEP)	Platinum	200,000^{‡}
Germany (BVMI)	Gold	300,000^{‡}
Hungary (MAHASZ)	Platinum	4,000^{‡}
Italy (FIMI)	Gold	50,000^{‡}
New Zealand (RMNZ)	3× Platinum	90,000^{‡}
Norway (IFPI Norway)	Platinum	60,000^{‡}
Poland (ZPAV)	Platinum	50,000^{‡}
Portugal (AFP)	Platinum	10,000^{‡}
Spain (Promusicae)	Platinum	60,000^{‡}
Switzerland (IFPI Switzerland)	Platinum	30,000^{‡}
United Kingdom (BPI)	2× Platinum	1,200,000^{‡}
United States (RIAA)	4× Platinum	4,000,000^{‡}
Streaming
Central America (CFC)	Platinum	7,000,000^{†}
Greece (IFPI Greece)	Platinum	2,000,000^{†}
Sweden (GLF)	Platinum	12,000,000^{†}
Worldwide (Luminate)	—	826,000,000
^{‡} Sales+streaming figures based on certification alone.^{†} Streaming-only figures based on certification alone.

== Release history ==
Release dates and formats
Region	Date	Format(s)	Version(s)	Label	Ref.
United States	March 12, 2024	Contemporary hit radio; hot adult contemporary radio	Original	Republic	
Various	March 13, 2024	Digital download; streaming	A cappella; instrumental; string	Republic	
Italy	April 12, 2024	Radio airplay	Original	Universal	
United States	May 24, 2024	Cassette	Original; string	Republic	
United States	May 24, 2024	CD	Original	Republic	
United Kingdom	May 31, 2024	CD	Original	Island	
United Kingdom	June 28, 2024	7-inch vinyl	Original; string	Island	
United States	June 28, 2024	7-inch vinyl	Original; string	Republic	
United Kingdom	July 12, 2024	Cassette	Original; string	Island	
Various	July 19, 2024	Streaming	Original; a cappella; instrumental; string; string instrumental	Republic	
Various	September 8, 2024	Streaming	Acoustic (live from Jungle City Studios)	Republic	
United States	December 2, 2025	4-inch vinyl	Original	Republic	

== See also ==
- List of Billboard Global 200 number ones of 2024
- List of Billboard Hot 100 number ones of 2024
- List of Billboard Streaming Songs number ones of 2024
- List of number-one singles from the 2020s (New Zealand)
- List of number-one songs of 2024 (Singapore)
