= List of Official Albums Streaming Chart number ones of 2019 =

The Official Albums Streaming Chart is a weekly music chart in the United Kingdom which calculates the most popular albums on audio streaming sites.

== Number ones ==
Key
No.	nth album to top the Official Albums Streaming Chart
re	Return of an album to number one
†	Most-streamed album of the year

Contents

No.	Artist (Note: The artist, song, date of reaching number one and number of weeks at number one are those given by the OCC.)	Album	Record label (Note: The record labels are those given by the OCC.)	Reached number one (for the week ending)	Weeks at number one	Ref.
re	Michael Bublé	Christmas	Reprise	3 January 2019	1	
re	Motion Picture Cast Recording	The Greatest Showman	Atlantic	10 January 2019	6	
re	Motion Picture Cast Recording	The Greatest Showman	Atlantic	17 January 2019	6	
re	Motion Picture Cast Recording	The Greatest Showman	Atlantic	24 January 2019	6	
re	Motion Picture Cast Recording	The Greatest Showman	Atlantic	31 January 2019	6	
re	Motion Picture Cast Recording	The Greatest Showman	Atlantic	7 February 2019	6	
re	Motion Picture Cast Recording	The Greatest Showman	Atlantic	14 February 2019	6	
43	Ariana Grande	Thank U, Next	Republic	21 February 2019	4	
43	Ariana Grande	Thank U, Next	Republic	28 February 2019	4	
43	Ariana Grande	Thank U, Next	Republic	7 March 2019	4	
43	Ariana Grande	Thank U, Next	Republic	14 March 2019	4	
44	Dave	Psychodrama	Dave/Neighbourhood	21 March 2019	3	
44	Dave	Psychodrama	Dave/Neighbourhood	28 March 2019	3	
44	Dave	Psychodrama	Dave/Neighbourhood	4 April 2019	3	
45	Billie Eilish	When We All Fall Asleep, Where Do We Go?	Interscope	11 April 2019	7	
45	Billie Eilish	When We All Fall Asleep, Where Do We Go?	Interscope	18 April 2019	7	
45	Billie Eilish	When We All Fall Asleep, Where Do We Go?	Interscope	25 April 2019	7	
45	Billie Eilish	When We All Fall Asleep, Where Do We Go?	Interscope	2 May 2019	7	
45	Billie Eilish	When We All Fall Asleep, Where Do We Go?	Interscope	9 May 2019	7	
45	Billie Eilish	When We All Fall Asleep, Where Do We Go?	Interscope	16 May 2019	7	
45	Billie Eilish	When We All Fall Asleep, Where Do We Go?	Interscope	23 May 2019	7	
46	Lewis Capaldi	Divinely Uninspired to a Hellish Extent	EMI	30 May 2019	8	
46	Lewis Capaldi	Divinely Uninspired to a Hellish Extent	EMI	6 June 2019	8	
46	Lewis Capaldi	Divinely Uninspired to a Hellish Extent	EMI	13 June 2019	8	
46	Lewis Capaldi	Divinely Uninspired to a Hellish Extent	EMI	20 June 2019	8	
46	Lewis Capaldi	Divinely Uninspired to a Hellish Extent	EMI	27 June 2019	8	
46	Lewis Capaldi	Divinely Uninspired to a Hellish Extent	EMI	4 July 2019	8	
46	Lewis Capaldi	Divinely Uninspired to a Hellish Extent	EMI	11 July 2019	8	
46	Lewis Capaldi	Divinely Uninspired to a Hellish Extent	EMI	18 July 2019	8	
47	Ed Sheeran	No.6 Collaborations Project	Asylum	25 July 2019	6	
47	Ed Sheeran	No.6 Collaborations Project	Asylum	1 August 2019	6	
47	Ed Sheeran	No.6 Collaborations Project	Asylum	8 August 2019	6	
47	Ed Sheeran	No.6 Collaborations Project	Asylum	15 August 2019	6	
47	Ed Sheeran	No.6 Collaborations Project	Asylum	22 August 2019	6	
47	Ed Sheeran	No.6 Collaborations Project	Asylum	29 August 2019	6	
48	Taylor Swift	Lover	EMI	5 September 2019	1	
re	Ed Sheeran	No.6 Collaborations Project	Asylum	12 September 2019	1	
49	Post Malone	Hollywood's Bleeding	Republic	19 September 2019	3	
49	Post Malone	Hollywood's Bleeding	Republic	26 September 2019	3	
49	Post Malone	Hollywood's Bleeding	Republic	3 October 2019	3	
50	D-Block Europe	PTSD	D-Block Europe	10 October 2019	1	
re	Post Malone	Hollywood's Bleeding	Republic	17 October 2019	1	
re	Ed Sheeran	No.6 Collaborations Project	Asylum	24 October 2019	2	
re	Ed Sheeran	No.6 Collaborations Project	Asylum	31 October 2019	2	
51	Kanye West	Jesus Is King	Def Jam	7 November 2019	1	
re	Ed Sheeran	No.6 Collaborations Project	Asylum	14 November 2019	2	
re	Ed Sheeran	No.6 Collaborations Project	Asylum	21 November 2019	2	
re	Lewis Capaldi	Divinely Uninspired to a Hellish Extent	EMI	28 November 2019	4	
re	Lewis Capaldi	Divinely Uninspired to a Hellish Extent	EMI	5 December 2019	4	
re	Lewis Capaldi	Divinely Uninspired to a Hellish Extent	EMI	12 December 2019	4	
re	Lewis Capaldi	Divinely Uninspired to a Hellish Extent	EMI	19 December 2019	4	
52	Stormzy	Heavy Is the Head	Atlantic/Merky	26 December 2019	1	
