= List of Official Albums Streaming Chart number ones of 2018 =

The Official Albums Streaming Chart is a weekly music chart in the United Kingdom which calculates the most popular albums on audio streaming sites.

== Number ones ==
Key
No.	nth album to top the Official Albums Streaming Chart
re	Return of an album to number one
†	Most-streamed album of the year

Contents

No.	Artist (Note: The artist, song, date of reaching number one and number of weeks at number one are those given by the OCC.)	Album	Record label (Note: The record labels are those given by the OCC.)	Reached number one (for the week ending)	Weeks at number one	Ref.
re	Michael Bublé	Christmas	Reprise	4 January 2018	1	
re	Ed Sheeran	÷	Asylum	11 January 2018	1	
28	Motion Picture Cast Recording	The Greatest Showman	Atlantic	18 January 2018	15	
28	Motion Picture Cast Recording	The Greatest Showman	Atlantic	25 January 2018	15	
28	Motion Picture Cast Recording	The Greatest Showman	Atlantic	1 February 2018	15	
28	Motion Picture Cast Recording	The Greatest Showman	Atlantic	8 February 2018	15	
28	Motion Picture Cast Recording	The Greatest Showman	Atlantic	15 February 2018	15	
28	Motion Picture Cast Recording	The Greatest Showman	Atlantic	22 February 2018	15	
28	Motion Picture Cast Recording	The Greatest Showman	Atlantic	1 March 2018	15	
28	Motion Picture Cast Recording	The Greatest Showman	Atlantic	8 March 2018	15	
28	Motion Picture Cast Recording	The Greatest Showman	Atlantic	15 March 2018	15	
28	Motion Picture Cast Recording	The Greatest Showman	Atlantic	22 March 2018	15	
28	Motion Picture Cast Recording	The Greatest Showman	Atlantic	29 March 2018	15	
28	Motion Picture Cast Recording	The Greatest Showman	Atlantic	5 April 2018	15	
28	Motion Picture Cast Recording	The Greatest Showman	Atlantic	12 April 2018	15	
28	Motion Picture Cast Recording	The Greatest Showman	Atlantic	19 April 2018	15	
28	Motion Picture Cast Recording	The Greatest Showman	Atlantic	26 April 2018	15	
29	J. Cole	KOD	Interscope	3 May 2018	1	
30	Post Malone	Beerbongs & Bentleys	Republic	10 May 2018	2	
30	Post Malone	Beerbongs & Bentleys	Republic	17 May 2018	2	
31	Arctic Monkeys	Tranquility Base Hotel & Casino	Domino	24 May 2018	1	
re	Post Malone	Beerbongs & Bentleys	Republic	31 May 2018	1	
re	Motion Picture Cast Recording	The Greatest Showman	Atlantic	7 June 2018	1	
32	Kanye West	Ye	Def Jam	14 June 2018	1	
re	Motion Picture Cast Recording	The Greatest Showman	Atlantic	21 June 2018	3	
re	Motion Picture Cast Recording	The Greatest Showman	Atlantic	28 June 2018	3	
re	Motion Picture Cast Recording	The Greatest Showman	Atlantic	5 July 2018	3	
33	Drake	Scorpion	Cash Money/Republic	12 July 2018	5	
33	Drake	Scorpion	Cash Money/Republic	19 July 2018	5	
33	Drake	Scorpion	Cash Money/Republic	26 July 2018	5	
33	Drake	Scorpion	Cash Money/Republic	2 August 2018	5	
33	Drake	Scorpion	Cash Money/Republic	9 August 2018	5	
34	Travis Scott	Astroworld	Epic	16 August 2018	1	
re	Drake	Scorpion	Cash Money/Republic	23 August 2018	1	
35	Ariana Grande	Sweetener	Republic	30 August 2018	2	
35	Ariana Grande	Sweetener	Republic	6 September 2018	2	
36	Eminem	Kamikaze	Interscope	13 September 2018	4	
36	Eminem	Kamikaze	Interscope	20 September 2018	4	
36	Eminem	Kamikaze	Interscope	27 September 2018	4	
36	Eminem	Kamikaze	Interscope	4 October 2018	4	
37	Lil Wayne	Tha Carter V	Cash Money/Republic	11 October 2018	1	
re	Motion Picture Cast Recording	The Greatest Showman	Atlantic	18 October 2018	3	
re	Motion Picture Cast Recording	The Greatest Showman	Atlantic	25 October 2018	3	
re	Motion Picture Cast Recording	The Greatest Showman	Atlantic	1 November 2018	3	
38	Queen	Bohemian Rhapsody: The Original Soundtrack	Virgin	8 November 2018	2	
38	Queen	Bohemian Rhapsody: The Original Soundtrack	Virgin	15 November 2018	2	
39	Queen	The Platinum Collection	Virgin	22 November 2018	1	
40	Little Mix	LM5	Syco	29 November 2018	1	
re	Queen	Bohemian Rhapsody: The Original Soundtrack	Virgin	6 December 2018	1	
41	6ix9ine	Dummy Boy	Ten Thousand Projects	13 December 2018	1	
42	XXXTentacion	Skins	Bad Vibes Forever	20 December 2018	1	
re	Motion Picture Cast Recording	The Greatest Showman	Atlantic	27 December 2018	1	
