= List of Official Albums Streaming Chart number ones of 2015 =

The Official Albums Streaming Chart is a weekly music chart in the United Kingdom which calculates the most popular albums on audio streaming sites. It was first launched in March 2015 and the first album to top the chart was Ed Sheeran's x. These are the albums which were number one on the chart in 2015.

== Number ones ==
Key
No.	nth album to top the Official Albums Streaming Chart
re	Return of an album to number one
†	Most-streamed album of the year

Contents

No.	Artist (Note: The artist, song, date of reaching number one and number of weeks at number one are those given by the OCC.)	Album	Record label (Note: The record labels are those given by the OCC.)	Reached number one (for the week ending)	Weeks at number one	Ref.
1	Ed Sheeran	x †	Atlantic	7 March 2015	2	
1	Ed Sheeran	x †	Atlantic	14 March 2015	2	
2	Sam Smith	In the Lonely Hour	Capitol	21 March 2015	1	
3	Kendrick Lamar	To Pimp a Butterfly	Top Dawg	28 March 2015	1	
re	Sam Smith	In the Lonely Hour	Capitol	4 April 2015	1	
re	Ed Sheeran	x †	Atlantic	11 April 2015	5	
re	Ed Sheeran	x †	Atlantic	18 April 2015	5	
re	Ed Sheeran	x †	Atlantic	25 April 2015	5	
re	Ed Sheeran	x †	Atlantic	2 May 2015	5	
re	Ed Sheeran	x †	Atlantic	9 May 2015	5	
4	Mumford & Sons	Wilder Mind	Gentlemen of the Road/Island	16 May 2015	2	
4	Mumford & Sons	Wilder Mind	Gentlemen of the Road/Island	23 May 2015	2	
re	Ed Sheeran	x †	Atlantic	30 May 2015	7	
re	Ed Sheeran	x †	Atlantic	6 June 2015	7	
re	Ed Sheeran	x †	Atlantic	13 June 2015	7	
re	Ed Sheeran	x †	Atlantic	20 June 2015	7	
re	Ed Sheeran	x †	Atlantic	27 June 2015	7	
re	Ed Sheeran	x †	Atlantic	4 July 2015	7	
re	Ed Sheeran	x †	Atlantic	9 July 2015	7	
5	Taylor Swift	1989	EMI	16 July 2015	1	
re	Ed Sheeran	x †	Atlantic	23 July 2015	6	
re	Ed Sheeran	x †	Atlantic	30 July 2015	6	
re	Ed Sheeran	x †	Atlantic	6 August 2015	6	
re	Ed Sheeran	x †	Atlantic	13 August 2015	6	
re	Ed Sheeran	x †	Atlantic	20 August 2015	6	
re	Ed Sheeran	x †	Atlantic	27 August 2015	6	
6	Jess Glynne	I Cry When I Laugh	Atlantic	3 September 2015	1	
7	The Weeknd	Beauty Behind the Madness	Republic/XO	10 September 2015	2	
7	The Weeknd	Beauty Behind the Madness	Republic/XO	17 September 2015	2	
8	Bring Me the Horizon	That's the Spirit	RCA	24 September 2015	1	
re	The Weeknd	Beauty Behind the Madness	Republic/XO	1 October 2015	1	
9	Drake & Future	What a Time to Be Alive	Cash Money/Epic/Republic	8 October 2015	1	
re	Ed Sheeran	x †	Atlantic	15 October 2015	6	
re	Ed Sheeran	x †	Atlantic	22 October 2015	6	
re	Ed Sheeran	x †	Atlantic	29 October 2015	6	
re	Ed Sheeran	x †	Atlantic	5 November 2015	6	
re	Ed Sheeran	x †	Atlantic	12 November 2015	6	
re	Ed Sheeran	x †	Atlantic	19 November 2015	6	
10	Justin Bieber	Purpose	Def Jam	26 November 2015	6	
10	Justin Bieber	Purpose	Def Jam	3 December 2015	6	
10	Justin Bieber	Purpose	Def Jam	10 December 2015	6	
10	Justin Bieber	Purpose	Def Jam	17 December 2015	6	
10	Justin Bieber	Purpose	Def Jam	24 December 2015	6	
10	Justin Bieber	Purpose	Def Jam	31 December 2015	6	
