= List of Official Albums Streaming Chart number ones of 2016 =

The Official Albums Streaming Chart is a weekly music chart in the United Kingdom which calculates the most popular albums on audio streaming sites. This is a list of the weekly most streamed albums of 2016.

== Number ones ==
Key
No.	nth album to top the Official Albums Streaming Chart
re	Return of an album to number one
†	Most-streamed album of the year

Contents

No.	Artist (Note: The artist, song, date of reaching number one and number of weeks at number one are those given by the OCC.)	Album	Record label (Note: The record labels are those given by the OCC.)	Reached number one (for the week ending)	Weeks at number one	Ref.
10	Justin Bieber	Purpose †	Def Jam	7 January 2016	17	
10	Justin Bieber	Purpose †	Def Jam	14 January 2016	17	
10	Justin Bieber	Purpose †	Def Jam	21 January 2016	17	
10	Justin Bieber	Purpose †	Def Jam	28 January 2016	17	
10	Justin Bieber	Purpose †	Def Jam	4 February 2016	17	
10	Justin Bieber	Purpose †	Def Jam	11 February 2016	17	
10	Justin Bieber	Purpose †	Def Jam	18 February 2016	17	
10	Justin Bieber	Purpose †	Def Jam	25 February 2016	17	
10	Justin Bieber	Purpose †	Def Jam	3 March 2016	17	
10	Justin Bieber	Purpose †	Def Jam	10 March 2016	17	
10	Justin Bieber	Purpose †	Def Jam	17 March 2016	17	
10	Justin Bieber	Purpose †	Def Jam	24 March 2016	17	
10	Justin Bieber	Purpose †	Def Jam	31 March 2016	17	
10	Justin Bieber	Purpose †	Def Jam	7 April 2016	17	
10	Justin Bieber	Purpose †	Def Jam	14 April 2016	17	
10	Justin Bieber	Purpose †	Def Jam	21 April 2016	17	
10	Justin Bieber	Purpose †	Def Jam	28 April 2016	17	
11	Beyoncé	Lemonade	Columbia/Parkwood	5 May 2016	1	
12	Drake	Views	Island	12 May 2016	1	
13	Skepta	Konnichiwa	Boy Better Know	19 May 2016	1	
re	Drake	Views	Island	26 May 2016	27	
re	Drake	Views	Island	2 June 2016	27	
re	Drake	Views	Island	9 June 2016	27	
re	Drake	Views	Island	16 June 2016	27	
re	Drake	Views	Island	23 June 2016	27	
re	Drake	Views	Island	30 June 2016	27	
re	Drake	Views	Island	7 July 2016	27	
re	Drake	Views	Island	14 July 2016	27	
re	Drake	Views	Island	21 July 2016	27	
re	Drake	Views	Island	28 July 2016	27	
re	Drake	Views	Island	4 August 2016	27	
re	Drake	Views	Island	11 August 2016	27	
re	Drake	Views	Island	18 August 2016	27	
re	Drake	Views	Island	25 August 2016	27	
re	Drake	Views	Island	1 September 2016	27	
re	Drake	Views	Island	8 September 2016	27	
re	Drake	Views	Island	15 September 2016	27	
re	Drake	Views	Island	22 September 2016	27	
re	Drake	Views	Island	29 September 2016	27	
re	Drake	Views	Island	6 October 2016	27	
re	Drake	Views	Island	13 October 2016	27	
re	Drake	Views	Island	20 October 2016	27	
re	Drake	Views	Island	27 October 2016	27	
re	Drake	Views	Island	3 November 2016	27	
re	Drake	Views	Island	10 November 2016	27	
re	Drake	Views	Island	17 November 2016	27	
re	Drake	Views	Island	24 November 2016	27	
14	Little Mix	Glory Days	Syco	1 December 2016	1	
15	The Weeknd	Starboy	Republic	8 December 2016	2	
15	The Weeknd	Starboy	Republic	15 December 2016	2	
16	J. Cole	4 Your Eyez Only	Interscope	22 December 2016	1	
re	The Weeknd	Starboy	Republic	29 December 2016	1	
