= Now That's What I Call Music! 53 =

Now That's What I Call Music! 53 or Now 53 may refer to both Now That's What I Call Music! series albums, including

- Now That's What I Call Music! 53 (UK series)
- Now That's What I Call Music! 53 (U.S. series)
