= Top Album Sales =

Music chart published by Billboard magazine

The Top Album Sales is a music chart released weekly by Billboard magazine listing each week's top-selling albums in the United States. The chart has been published since December 13, 2014, although the magazine also retrospectively recognizes the Billboard 200 charts from May 25, 1991, through December 6, 2014, as part of the history of the Top Album Sales listing. Sales figures for the chart are tabulated by Billboard with electronically monitored piece count information from Nielsen SoundScan, now Luminate. The Top Album Sales and the Top Streaming Albums are component charts of the Billboard 200.

The first number-one album actually published under the Top Album Sales banner was 1989 by Taylor Swift. However, since Billboard also recognizes the history of the Billboard 200 chart since 1991 as part of this chart, the magazine recognizes the first chart-topper as Time, Love & Tenderness by Michael Bolton.

== History ==
On May 25, 1991, Billboard began tabulating top-selling albums in the United States with electronically monitored piece count information from Nielsen Soundscan, now known as Luminate. Up until December 2014, the weekly top-selling albums had been documented by the Billboard 200 chart, but that chart was altered to factor in music streaming by accounting for album-equivalent units in its tallies to document the effect of the rise of music streaming services such as Apple Music and Spotify. During the week of December 6, 2014, the chart switched to a methodology that blends album sales with track equivalent album units and streaming equivalent album units. The Top Album Sales chart was created to preserve the older methodology of counting pure album sales.

The Top Album Sales and the Billboard 200 listed different number-one albums for the first time on February 8, 2015, when Now That's What I Call Music! 53 reached number one on the Top Album Sales (98,000 copies sold), while Taylor Swift's 1989 took the top spot on the Billboard 200 (77,000 copies sold). As streaming became a major metric in music, the disparity between the Top Album Sales and the Billboard 200 grew larger. On October 8, 2016, Drake's Views became the first number-one album on the Billboard 200 to miss the Top 10 of the Top Album Sales, charting at number 22. Meanwhile, We Are Superhuman by NCT 127 became the first album to reach number one on the Top Album Sales but fail to crack the Top 10 of the Billboard 200, peaking at number 11 on June 8, 2019. As streaming continued to dominate, Hoodie SZN by A Boogie wit da Hoodie became the first Billboard 200 number one to miss the Top Album Sales entirely, not selling enough copies to rank within the Top 100 on January 19, 2019. On October 28, 2023, the Top Streaming Albums chart was launched by Billboard and the Top Album Sales chart was reduced from 100 positions to 50.

In December 2023, Taylor Swift became the first act to simultaneously occupy the top 4 positions of the chart. The following month, January 2024, Swift also became the first act to simultaneously occupy seven of the top-ten positions. Swift's 2025 album The Life of a Showgirl holds the record for most single-week sales on the Top Album Sales chart, selling 3,479,500 copies through the week of October 18, 2025.

== Achievements and milestones ==
Chart achievements listed below cover the Top Album Sales since its launch in December 2014, as well as the Billboard 200 data between May 1991 and December 2014, which Billboard retrospectively recognizes as part of the Top Album Sales statistics.

=== Most number-one albums ===
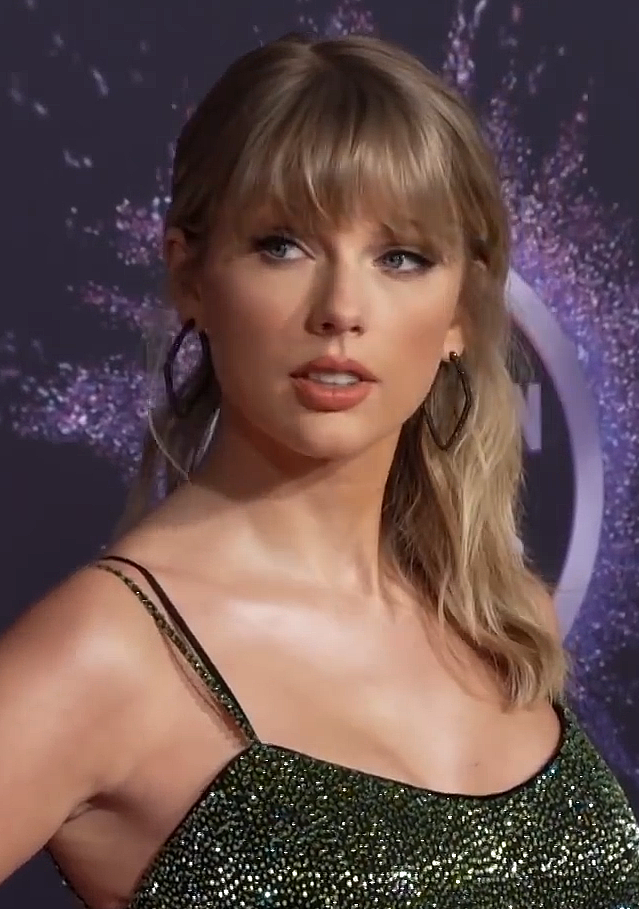
Taylor Swift charted 16 number ones on the Top Album Sales, including 13 number ones since December 2014.

Number of albums	Artist	Ref.
16	Taylor Swift	
14	Jay-Z	
12	Kenny Chesney	
10	Eminem	
9	Garth Brooks	
9	Madonna	
8	Drake	
8	Kanye West	
8	Bruce Springsteen	
8	Beyoncé	

=== Most top-ten albums ===
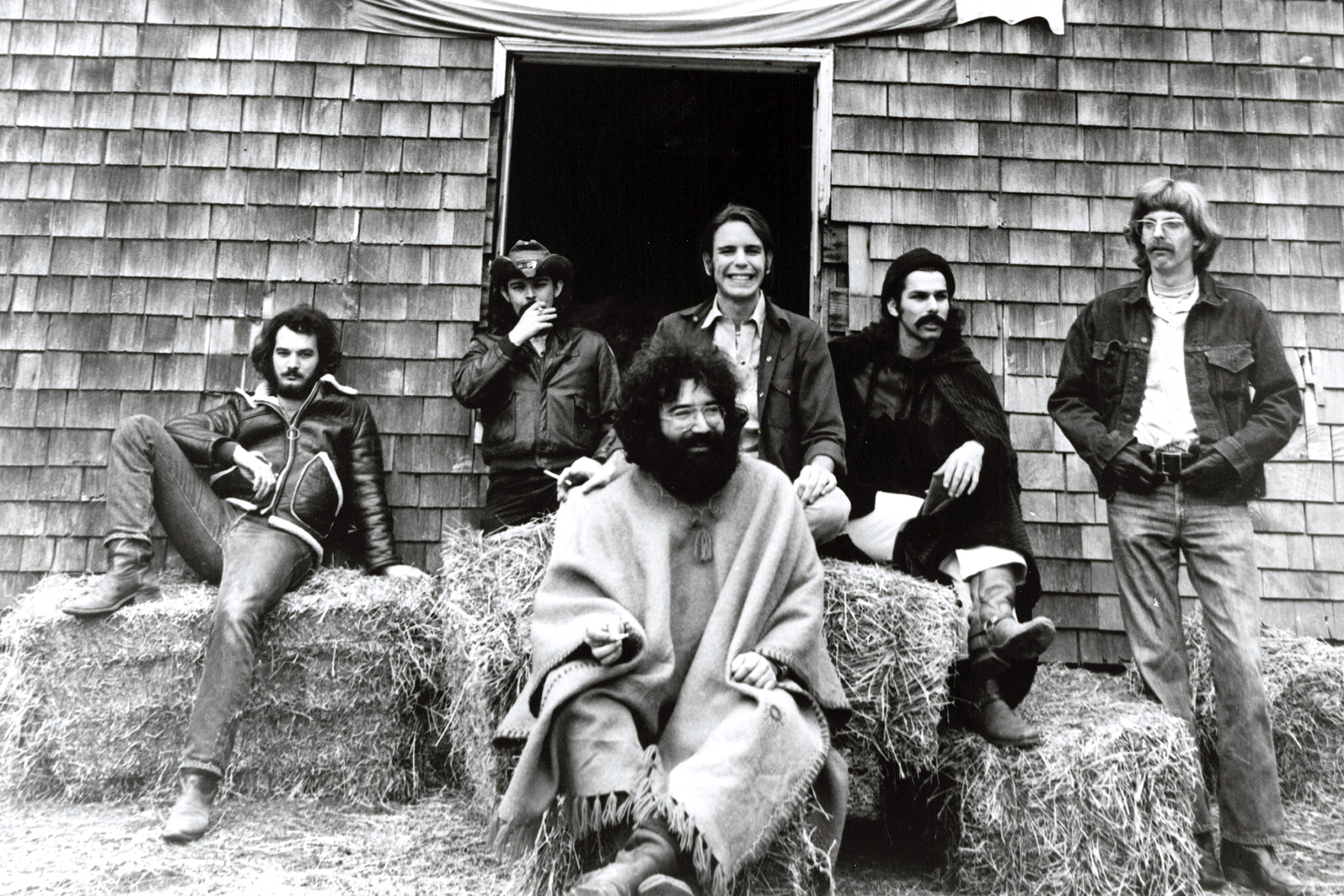
Grateful Dead charted 49 top-ten entries on the Top Album Sales

Number of albums	Artist	Ref.
49	Grateful Dead	
22	George Strait	
21	Prince	
21	Garth Brooks	
20	Mariah Carey	
19	Bruce Springsteen	
19	Taylor Swift	
19	Tim McGraw	
18	Pearl Jam	
17	Jay-Z	
17	Kenny Chesney	
17	The Beatles	
17	Drake	
17	Madonna	

== See also ==
- List of Top Album Sales number ones of the 2010s
- List of Top Album Sales number ones of the 2020s
