= List of Billboard Streaming Songs number ones of 2013 =

This is a list of the U.S. Billboard magazine Streaming Songs number-ones of 2013.

== Chart history ==
Key
| † | Indicates best-charting streaming song of 2013 |

| Issue date | Song | Artist(s) | Weekly Streams |
|---|---|---|---|
| January 19 | "Thrift Shop" | Macklemore & Ryan Lewis featuring Wanz | 1.26 million |
| January 26 | "Thrift Shop" | Macklemore & Ryan Lewis featuring Wanz | 1.46 million |
| February 2 | "Thrift Shop" | Macklemore & Ryan Lewis featuring Wanz | 1.68 million |
| February 9 | "Thrift Shop" | Macklemore & Ryan Lewis featuring Wanz | 1.86 million |
| February 16 | "Thrift Shop" | Macklemore & Ryan Lewis featuring Wanz | 2 million |
| February 23 | "Thrift Shop" | Macklemore & Ryan Lewis featuring Wanz | 2.1 million |
| March 2 | "Harlem Shake" † | Baauer | 103 million |
| March 9 | "Harlem Shake" † | Baauer | 98 million |
| March 16 | "Harlem Shake" † | Baauer | 54 million |
| March 23 | "Harlem Shake" † | Baauer | 48 million |
| March 30 | "Harlem Shake" † | Baauer | 28 million |
| April 6 | "Harlem Shake" † | Baauer | 20 million |
| April 13 | "Harlem Shake" † | Baauer | 14 million |
| April 20 | "Harlem Shake" † | Baauer | 9.7 million |
| April 27 | "Gentleman" | PSY | 8.6 million |
| May 4 | "Gentleman" | PSY | 13.9 million |
| May 11 | "Thrift Shop" | Macklemore & Ryan Lewis featuring Wanz | |
| May 18 | "Thrift Shop" | Macklemore & Ryan Lewis featuring Wanz | |
| May 25 | "Gangnam Style" | PSY | |
| June 1 | "Gangnam Style" | PSY | |
| June 8 | "Gangnam Style" | PSY | |
| June 15 | "Gangnam Style" | PSY | |
| June 22 | "Gangnam Style" | PSY | |
| June 29 | "Gangnam Style" | PSY | |
| July 6 | "We Can't Stop" | Miley Cyrus | 9.6 million |
| July 13 | "We Can't Stop" | Miley Cyrus | 8 million |
| July 20 | "We Can't Stop" | Miley Cyrus | 7.8 million |
| July 27 | "We Can't Stop" | Miley Cyrus | 7.4 million |
| August 3 | "We Can't Stop" | Miley Cyrus | 10.1 million |
| August 10 | "We Can't Stop" | Miley Cyrus | 8.9 million |
| August 17 | "We Can't Stop" | Miley Cyrus | 8.28 million |
| August 24 | "We Can't Stop" | Miley Cyrus | 7.7 million |
| August 31 | "We Can't Stop" | Miley Cyrus | 6.9 million |
| September 7 | "We Can't Stop" | Miley Cyrus | 6.4 million |
| September 14 | "We Can't Stop" | Miley Cyrus | 8.1 million |
| September 21 | "Roar" | Katy Perry | 12 million |
| September 28 | "Wrecking Ball" | Miley Cyrus | 36.5 million |
| October 5 | "Wrecking Ball" | Miley Cyrus | 14.3 million |
| October 12 | "Wrecking Ball" | Miley Cyrus | 11.8 million |
| October 19 | "The Fox (What Does the Fox Say?)" | Ylvis | 12.4 million |
| October 26 | "Wrecking Ball" | Miley Cyrus | 13 million |
| November 2 | "The Fox (What Does the Fox Say?)" | Ylvis | 10.9 million |
| November 9 | "Wrecking Ball" | Miley Cyrus | 8.9 million |
| November 16 | "Wrecking Ball" | Miley Cyrus | 8.6 million |
| November 23 | "Dope" | Lady Gaga | 8.2 million |
| November 30 | "Wrecking Ball" | Miley Cyrus | 8.7 million |
| December 7 | "Wrecking Ball" | Miley Cyrus | 7.8 million |
| December 14 | "Wrecking Ball" | Miley Cyrus | 18.6 million |
| December 21 | "Wrecking Ball" | Miley Cyrus | 8 million |
| December 28 | "Wrecking Ball" | Miley Cyrus | |

== See also ==
- 2013 in music
- List of Billboard Hot 100 number-one singles of 2013
