= List of Billboard Streaming Songs number ones of 2017 =

This is a list of songs that reached number one on the Billboard magazine Streaming Songs chart in 2017.

== Chart history ==
Key
†	Indicates best-performing single of 2017

Issue date	Song	Artist(s)	Weekly streams
January 7	"Black Beatles"	Rae Sremmurd featuring Gucci Mane	29.3 million
January 14	"Bad and Boujee"	Migos featuring Lil Uzi Vert	32.5 million
January 21	"Bad and Boujee"	Migos featuring Lil Uzi Vert	35.3 million
January 28	"Bad and Boujee"	Migos featuring Lil Uzi Vert	38.7 million
February 4	"Bad and Boujee"	Migos featuring Lil Uzi Vert	43 million
February 11	"Bad and Boujee"	Migos featuring Lil Uzi Vert	47 million
February 18	"Bad and Boujee"	Migos featuring Lil Uzi Vert	50 million
February 25	"Bad and Boujee"	Migos featuring Lil Uzi Vert	47.3 million
March 4	"Bad and Boujee"	Migos featuring Lil Uzi Vert	47.7 million
March 11	"Bad and Boujee"	Migos featuring Lil Uzi Vert	46.4 million
March 18	"Bad and Boujee"	Migos featuring Lil Uzi Vert	43.9 million
March 25	"Shape of You"	Ed Sheeran	50.8 million
April 1	"Shape of You"	Ed Sheeran	47.8 million
April 8	"Shape of You"	Ed Sheeran	46.4 million
April 15	"Shape of You"	Ed Sheeran	46.2 million
April 22	"Humble"	Kendrick Lamar	49.8 million
April 29	"Humble"	Kendrick Lamar	43.2 million
May 6	"Humble"	Kendrick Lamar	67.4 million
May 13	"Humble"	Kendrick Lamar	57.6 million
May 20	"I'm the One"	DJ Khaled featuring Quavo, Justin Bieber, Chance the Rapper, and Lil Wayne	53.9 million
May 27	"Despacito" †	Luis Fonsi and Daddy Yankee feat. Justin Bieber	54.3 million
June 3	"Despacito" †	Luis Fonsi and Daddy Yankee feat. Justin Bieber	59.4 million
June 10	"Despacito" †	Luis Fonsi and Daddy Yankee feat. Justin Bieber	65.4 million
June 17	"Despacito" †	Luis Fonsi and Daddy Yankee feat. Justin Bieber	69.6 million
June 24	"Despacito" †	Luis Fonsi and Daddy Yankee feat. Justin Bieber	68.3 million
July 1	"Despacito" †	Luis Fonsi and Daddy Yankee feat. Justin Bieber	69.4 million
July 8	"Despacito" †	Luis Fonsi and Daddy Yankee feat. Justin Bieber	66.6 million
July 15	"Despacito" †	Luis Fonsi and Daddy Yankee feat. Justin Bieber	62.6 million
July 22	"Despacito" †	Luis Fonsi and Daddy Yankee feat. Justin Bieber	61.2 million
July 29	"Despacito" †	Luis Fonsi and Daddy Yankee feat. Justin Bieber	60.3 million
August 5	"Despacito" †	Luis Fonsi and Daddy Yankee feat. Justin Bieber	57.6 million
August 12	"Despacito" †	Luis Fonsi and Daddy Yankee feat. Justin Bieber	52.9 million
August 19	"Despacito" †	Luis Fonsi and Daddy Yankee feat. Justin Bieber	49.8 million
August 26	"Despacito" †	Luis Fonsi and Daddy Yankee feat. Justin Bieber	49.4 million
September 2	"Despacito" †	Luis Fonsi and Daddy Yankee feat. Justin Bieber	46.4 million
September 9	"Despacito" †	Luis Fonsi and Daddy Yankee feat. Justin Bieber	44.6 million
September 16	"Look What You Made Me Do"	Taylor Swift	84.4 million
September 23	"Look What You Made Me Do"	Taylor Swift	61.2 million
September 30	"Bodak Yellow"	Cardi B	40.8 million
October 7	"Rockstar"	Post Malone feat. 21 Savage	44.1 million
October 14	"Bodak Yellow"	Cardi B	47.9 million
October 21	"Rockstar"	Post Malone feat. 21 Savage	49.7 million
October 28	"Rockstar"	Post Malone feat. 21 Savage	51.3 million
November 4	"Rockstar"	Post Malone feat. 21 Savage	54.3 million
November 11	"Rockstar"	Post Malone feat. 21 Savage	53 million
November 18	"Rockstar"	Post Malone feat. 21 Savage	46 million
November 25	"Rockstar"	Post Malone feat. 21 Savage	43.6 million
December 2	"Rockstar"	Post Malone feat. 21 Savage	49.2 million
December 9	"Rockstar"	Post Malone feat. 21 Savage	55.5 million
December 16	"Rockstar"	Post Malone feat. 21 Savage	50.5 million
December 23	"Rockstar"	Post Malone feat. 21 Savage	48.9 million
December 30	"Rockstar"	Post Malone feat. 21 Savage	43.9 million

== See also ==
- 2017 in American music
- List of Billboard Hot 100 number-one singles of 2017
