= List of Billboard Streaming Songs number ones of 2015 =

This is a list of songs that reached number one on the Billboard magazine Streaming Songs chart in 2015.

== Chart history ==
Key
†	Indicates best-charting streaming song of 2015

Issue date	Song	Artist(s)	Weekly streams
January 3	"Blank Space"	Taylor Swift	11.4 million
January 10	"All About That Bass"	Meghan Trainor	9.5 million
January 17	"Blank Space"	Taylor Swift	10.9 million
January 24	"Uptown Funk"	Mark Ronson featuring Bruno Mars	11.6 million
January 31	"Shake It Off"	Taylor Swift	16.7 million
February 7	"Uptown Funk"	Mark Ronson featuring Bruno Mars	15.1 million
February 14	"Uptown Funk"	Mark Ronson featuring Bruno Mars	24.5 million
February 21	"Uptown Funk"	Mark Ronson featuring Bruno Mars	17.9 million
February 28	"Uptown Funk"	Mark Ronson featuring Bruno Mars	18.2 million
March 7	"Uptown Funk"	Mark Ronson featuring Bruno Mars	19.8 million
March 14	"Uptown Funk"	Mark Ronson featuring Bruno Mars	18.8 million
March 21	"Uptown Funk"	Mark Ronson featuring Bruno Mars	17.4 million
March 28	"Uptown Funk"	Mark Ronson featuring Bruno Mars	16.9 million
April 4	"Uptown Funk"	Mark Ronson featuring Bruno Mars	19.1 million
April 11	"Uptown Funk"	Mark Ronson featuring Bruno Mars	16.2 million
April 18	"Uptown Funk"	Mark Ronson featuring Bruno Mars	15.8 million
April 25	"See You Again"	Wiz Khalifa featuring Charlie Puth	25 million
May 2	"See You Again"	Wiz Khalifa featuring Charlie Puth	24.6 million
May 9	"See You Again"	Wiz Khalifa featuring Charlie Puth	24 million
May 16	"See You Again"	Wiz Khalifa featuring Charlie Puth	24 million
May 23	"See You Again"	Wiz Khalifa featuring Charlie Puth	24.5 million
May 30	"See You Again"	Wiz Khalifa featuring Charlie Puth	22.9 million
June 6	"See You Again"	Wiz Khalifa featuring Charlie Puth	22.7 million
June 13	"See You Again"	Wiz Khalifa featuring Charlie Puth	20.7 million
June 20	"Trap Queen" †	Fetty Wap	21.4 million
June 27	"Trap Queen" †	Fetty Wap	20.4 million
July 4	"Trap Queen" †	Fetty Wap	19.4 million
July 11	"Trap Queen" †	Fetty Wap	19.4 million
July 18	"Trap Queen" †	Fetty Wap	19.6 million
July 25	"Trap Queen" †	Fetty Wap	18.9 million
August 1	"Trap Queen" †	Fetty Wap	18.4 million
August 8	"Watch Me (Whip/Nae Nae)"	Silentó	18.2 million
August 15	"Watch Me (Whip/Nae Nae)"	Silentó	19 million
August 22	"Watch Me (Whip/Nae Nae)"	Silentó	20.7 million
August 29	"Watch Me (Whip/Nae Nae)"	Silentó	21.2 million
September 5	"Watch Me (Whip/Nae Nae)"	Silentó	16.8 million
September 12	"Watch Me (Whip/Nae Nae)"	Silentó	22.3 million
September 19	"Watch Me (Whip/Nae Nae)"	Silentó	26.2 million
September 26	"Watch Me (Whip/Nae Nae)"	Silentó	23.5 million
October 3	"The Hills"	The Weeknd	18.3 million
October 10	"Watch Me (Whip/Nae Nae)"	Silentó	19.7 million
October 17	"The Hills"	The Weeknd	18.5 million
October 24	"Watch Me (Whip/Nae Nae)"	Silentó	22.4 million
October 31	"The Hills"	The Weeknd	20 million
November 7	"The Hills"	The Weeknd	19.4 million
November 14	"Hello"	Adele	61.6 million
November 21	"Hello"	Adele	47.4 million
November 28	"Hello"	Adele	44.7 million
December 5	"Hello"	Adele	34.7 million
December 12	"Hello"	Adele	35.5 million
December 19	"Hello"	Adele	27.5 million
December 26	"Hello"	Adele	26.4 million

== See also ==
- 2015 in music
- List of Billboard Hot 100 number-one singles of 2015
- List of number-one On-Demand Songs of 2015
