= List of Billboard Streaming Songs number ones of 2026 =

These are the songs that hit number one on the Billboard magazine Streaming Songs chart in 2026.

== Chart history ==
Issue date	Song	Artist(s)	Weekly streams
January 3	"All I Want for Christmas Is You"	Mariah Carey	70.6 million
January 10	"The Fate of Ophelia"	Taylor Swift	18.3 million
January 17	"End of Beginning"	Djo	19.1 million
January 24	"I Just Might"	Bruno Mars	23.5 million
January 31	"Choosin' Texas"	Ella Langley	18 million
February 7	"Aperture"	Harry Styles	18.2 million
February 14	"Choosin' Texas"	Ella Langley	22.1 million
February 21	"DTMF"	Bad Bunny	43 million
February 28	"DTMF"	Bad Bunny	24.2 million
March 7	"Choosin' Texas"	Ella Langley	20.4 million
March 14	"Risk It All"	Bruno Mars	23.2 million
March 21	"American Girls"	Harry Styles	20.3 million
March 28	"Choosin' Texas"	Ella Langley	21.8 million
April 4	"Choosin' Texas"	Ella Langley	23.7 million
April 11	"Choosin' Texas"	Ella Langley	23.9 million
April 18	"Choosin' Texas"	Ella Langley	26.6 million
April 25	"Choosin' Texas"	Ella Langley	30.7 million
May 2	"Drop Dead"	Olivia Rodrigo	27.9 million
May 9	"Choosin' Texas"	Ella Langley	26.6 million
May 16	"Choosin' Texas"	Ella Langley	26.6 million
May 23	"Choosin' Texas"	Ella Langley	27.8 million
May 30	"Janice STFU"	Drake	40.7 million
June 6	"Janice STFU"	Drake	31.5 million
June 13	"Janice STFU"	Drake	26.7 million
June 20	"I Knew It, I Knew You"	Taylor Swift	27.2 million
June 27	"Stupid Song"	Olivia Rodrigo	28.4 million
July 4	"Choosin' Texas"	Ella Langley	25.5 million
July 11	"Choosin' Texas"	Ella Langley	25.8 million
July 18	"Choosin' Texas"	Ella Langley	25.1 million
July 25	"Choosin' Texas"	Ella Langley	24 million
August 1	"Choosin' Texas"	Ella Langley	25.2 million
August 8	"Been By Now"	Morgan Wallen	26.5 million
August 15	"Choosin' Texas"	Ella Langley	24.9 million
August 22	"Choosin' Texas"	Ella Langley	25 million
August 29	"Choosin' Texas"	Ella Langley	24.3 million
September 5	"Choosin' Texas"	Ella Langley	24.2 million
September 12	"Choosin' Texas"	Ella Langley	24.5 million
September 19	"Choosin' Texas"	Ella Langley	24 million
September 26	"Choosin' Texas"	Ella Langley	21.8 million
October 3	"Choosin' Texas"	Ella Langley	22.3 million
October 10	"Patient Zero"	Taylor Swift	34.5 million
October 17	"Choosin' Texas"	Ella Langley	20.8 million
October 24	"Choosin' Texas"	Ella Langley	19.8 million
October 31	"Housewife"	Tate McRae	22.9 million
November 7	"Housewife"	Tate McRae	20.8 million
November 14	"Thriller"	Michael Jackson	17.4 million
November 21	"Choosin' Texas"	Ella Langley	17.8 million

== See also ==
- 2026 in American music
- List of Billboard Hot 100 number ones of 2026
