= List of Billboard Streaming Songs number ones of 2024 =

This is a list of songs that reached number one on the Billboard magazine Streaming Songs chart in 2024.

== Chart history ==
Key
The most streamed song of 2024, "I Remember Everything" by Zach Bryan featuring Kacey Musgraves, reached number one on the chart in 2023.

Issue date	Song	Artist(s)	Weekly streams
January 6	"Rockin' Around the Christmas Tree"	Brenda Lee	57.3 million
January 13	"Lovin on Me"	Jack Harlow	29 million
January 20	"Lovin on Me"	Jack Harlow	27.9 million
January 27	"Yes, And?"	Ariana Grande	27.2 million
February 3	"Lovin on Me"	Jack Harlow	27.4 million
February 10	"Hiss"	Megan Thee Stallion	29.2 million
February 17	"Beautiful Things"	Benson Boone	22.8 million
February 24	"Carnival"	Kanye West and Ty Dolla Sign featuring Rich the Kid and Playboi Carti	23.5 million
March 2	"Texas Hold 'Em"	Beyoncé	29 million
March 9	"Carnival"	Kanye West and Ty Dolla Sign featuring Rich the Kid and Playboi Carti	32.2 million
March 16	"Carnival"	Kanye West and Ty Dolla Sign featuring Rich the Kid and Playboi Carti	33.7 million
March 23	"We Can't Be Friends (Wait for Your Love)"	Ariana Grande	32.6 million
March 30	"We Can't Be Friends (Wait for Your Love)"	Ariana Grande	26.3 million
April 6	"Like That"	Future, Metro Boomin and Kendrick Lamar	59.6 million
April 13	"Like That"	Future, Metro Boomin and Kendrick Lamar	46.1 million
April 20	"Like That"	Future, Metro Boomin and Kendrick Lamar	40 million
April 27	"Too Sweet"	Hozier	35.6 million
May 4	"Fortnight"	Taylor Swift featuring Post Malone	76.2 million
May 11	"Million Dollar Baby"	Tommy Richman	38 million
May 18	"Not Like Us"	Kendrick Lamar	70.9 million
May 25	"I Had Some Help"	Post Malone featuring Morgan Wallen	76.4 million
June 1	"Not Like Us"	Kendrick Lamar	59.7 million
June 8	"Not Like Us"	Kendrick Lamar	51.9 million
June 15	"Houdini"	Eminem	48.8 million
June 22	"Please Please Please"	Sabrina Carpenter	50.3 million
June 29	"Please Please Please"	Sabrina Carpenter	50.9 million
July 6	"Not Like Us"	Kendrick Lamar	45.4 million
July 13	"A Bar Song (Tipsy)"	Shaboozey	45.8 million
July 20	"Not Like Us"	Kendrick Lamar	53.8 million
July 27	"Not Like Us"	Kendrick Lamar	—
August 3	"A Bar Song (Tipsy)"	Shaboozey	37.3 million
August 10	"A Bar Song (Tipsy)"	Shaboozey	35.9 million
August 17	"A Bar Song (Tipsy)"	Shaboozey	33.9 million
August 24	"A Bar Song (Tipsy)"	Shaboozey	33.3 million
August 31	"I Had Some Help"	Post Malone featuring Morgan Wallen	—
September 7	"Taste"	Sabrina Carpenter	42.5 million
September 14	"Taste"	Sabrina Carpenter	31.4 million
September 21	"Taste"	Sabrina Carpenter	27 million
September 28	"A Bar Song (Tipsy)"	Shaboozey	28.7 million
October 5	"A Bar Song (Tipsy)"	Shaboozey	27.8 million
October 12	"Timeless"	The Weeknd and Playboi Carti	28.6 million
October 19	"A Bar Song (Tipsy)"	Shaboozey	26.4 million
October 26	"A Bar Song (Tipsy)"	Shaboozey	24.9 million
November 2	"Love Somebody"	Morgan Wallen	31.1 million
November 9	"St. Chroma"	Tyler, the Creator featuring Daniel Caesar	24.3 million
November 16	"Sticky"	Tyler, the Creator featuring GloRilla, Sexyy Red and Lil Wayne	20.9 million
November 23	"That's So True"	Gracie Abrams	23.5 million
November 30	"That's So True"	Gracie Abrams	22.8 million
December 7	"Squabble Up"	Kendrick Lamar	52 million
December 14	"All I Want for Christmas Is You"	Mariah Carey	38.2 million
December 21	"All I Want for Christmas Is You"	Mariah Carey	47.7 million
December 28	"All I Want for Christmas Is You"	Mariah Carey	48 million

== See also ==
- 2024 in American music
- List of Billboard Hot 100 number ones of 2024
