= Imperfect for You =

2024 song by Ariana Grande

Song by Ariana Grande

from the album Eternal Sunshine
- A-side: "We Can't Be Friends (Wait for Your Love)"
- Released: March 8, 2024
- Recorded: 2023
- Studio: Decoy Studios (Woodbridge, UK); Jungle City Studios (New York, NY); MXM Studios (Stockholm, Sweden)
- Genre: R&B; alternative rock
- Length: 3:02
- Label: Republic
- Songwriters: Ariana Grande; Max Martin; Ilya Salmanzadeh; Peter Kahm
- Producers: Ariana Grande; Max Martin; Ilya

Lyric visualizer
- "Imperfect for You" on YouTube

"Imperfect for You" is a song by American singer-songwriter Ariana Grande, taken from her seventh studio album, Eternal Sunshine (2024). It was released with the album on March 8, 2024, through Republic Records. An R&B and alternative rock song with psychedelic soul influences, "Imperfect for You" was written and produced by Grande, Max Martin, and Ilya Salmanzadeh, with Peter Kahm receiving writing credits. An acoustic version was released on March 10, 2024, as part of the "Slightly Deluxe" edition of Eternal Sunshine.

== Background and composition ==
'Imperfect for You' [was the last song finished for the album] which is my favorite. I love it so much, I love it so much. I don't know why it's my favorite, I think sonically it is my favorite, it's very different for me, it's very trippy, Rubber Soul vibes, and that is my favorite music to listen to and I don't think I ever explored it for myself, but it just felt really fun to lean in to it and make something super trippy, 60s, organic feeling, just capturing that kind of thing.

— Ariana Grande on "Imperfect for You"

"Imperfect for You" runs for a total duration of three minutes and two seconds. As the twelfth track on the album, Grande told Zane Lowe in an interview that "Imperfect for You" was an ode to friends, family, and loved ones who are "accepting and real", and that it was an important song which "demands room for nuance and humanness". The song has been described as an R&B and alternative rock ballad with influences of psychedelic soul. In an interview with Zach Sang, Grande mentioned how the song was the last to be finished, deeming it one of her own favorites from the album.

Grande sings about accepting the imperfections of a relationship, which is described as a love story eventually becoming a "happy disaster" by Billboard.

== Live performance ==
"Imperfect for You" was performed live for the first time on March 9, 2024, during an episode of Saturday Night Live with her mother Joan introducing the performance, alongside Eternal Sunshine's second single, "We Can't Be Friends (Wait for Your Love)".

== Credits and personnel ==
Recording

- Mixed at Mixstar Studios (Virginia Beach)
- Mastered at Sterling Sound (New York City)

Personnel

- Ariana Grande – vocals, lyrics, composition, production
- Max Martin – lyrics, production, composition, guitar, drums, keyboards, bass, programming, background vocals
- Ilya Salmanzadeh – production, composition, guitar, drums, keyboards, bass, programming, background vocals
- Peter Kahm – composition
- Sam Holland – engineering
- Lou Carrao – engineering
- Eric Eylands – engineering assistance
- Rob Sellens – engineering assistance
- Randy Merrill – mastering
- Serban Ghenea – mixing
- Bryce Bordone – mixing assistance

== Charts ==
Chart performance for "Imperfect for You"
Chart (2024)	Peak position
Australia (ARIA)	80
Canada Hot 100 (Billboard)	35
France (SNEP)	131
Global 200 (Billboard)	25
Greece International (IFPI)	41
Portugal (AFP)	57
UK Streaming (OCC)	32
US Billboard Hot 100	37

== Certifications ==
Certifications for "Imperfect for You"
Region	Certification	Certified units/sales
Brazil (Pro-Música Brasil)	Platinum	40,000^{‡}
^{‡} Sales+streaming figures based on certification alone.
