= List of Billboard Streaming Songs number ones of 2025 =

This is a list of songs that reached number one on the Billboard magazine Streaming Songs chart in 2025.

== Chart history ==
Key
†	Indicates the most streamed song of 2025

Issue date	Song	Artist(s)	Weekly streams
January 4	"All I Want for Christmas Is You"	Mariah Carey	71.9 million
January 11	"Die with a Smile" †	Lady Gaga and Bruno Mars	27.1 million
January 18	"Die with a Smile" †	Lady Gaga and Bruno Mars	28 million
January 25	"DTMF"	Bad Bunny	34.9 million
February 1	"DTMF"	Bad Bunny	28.5 million
February 8	"Die with a Smile" †	Lady Gaga and Bruno Mars	27.7 million
February 15	"I'm the Problem"	Morgan Wallen	29.2 million
February 22	"Not Like Us"	Kendrick Lamar	49 million
March 1	"Luther"	Kendrick Lamar and SZA	45.2 million
March 8	"Luther"	Kendrick Lamar and SZA	38.7 million
March 15	"Luther"	Kendrick Lamar and SZA	34.2 million
March 22	"Luther"	Kendrick Lamar and SZA	31.3 million
March 29	"Evil J0rdan"	Playboi Carti	30.8 million
April 5	"Luther"	Kendrick Lamar and SZA	26.3 million
April 12	"Luther"	Kendrick Lamar and SZA	24.4 million
April 19	"All the Way"	BigXthaPlug featuring Bailey Zimmerman	24.1 million
April 26	"Luther"	Kendrick Lamar and SZA	25 million
May 3	"Ordinary"	Alex Warren	21 million
May 10	"Ordinary"	Alex Warren	21.5 million
May 17	"Ordinary"	Alex Warren	21.6 million
May 24	"Ordinary"	Alex Warren	21.7 million
May 31	"What I Want"	Morgan Wallen featuring Tate McRae	31.2 million
June 7	"What I Want"	Morgan Wallen featuring Tate McRae	25.1 million
June 14	"What I Want"	Morgan Wallen featuring Tate McRae	24.1 million
June 21	"Manchild"	Sabrina Carpenter	27.1 million
June 28	"What I Want"	Morgan Wallen featuring Tate McRae	21.7 million
July 5	"What I Want"	Morgan Wallen featuring Tate McRae	22.3 million
July 12	"What I Want"	Morgan Wallen featuring Tate McRae	22.8 million
July 19	"What Did I Miss?"	Drake	22.6 million
July 26	"Daisies"	Justin Bieber	27.6 million
August 2	"Golden"	Huntrix	25.7 million
August 9	"Golden"	Huntrix	28.9 million
August 16	"Golden"	Huntrix	31.7 million
August 23	"Golden"	Huntrix	32.8 million
August 30	"Golden"	Huntrix	33.8 million
September 6	"Golden"	Huntrix	35.3 million
September 13	"Golden"	Huntrix	34.5 million
September 20	"Golden"	Huntrix	33.8 million
September 27	"Golden"	Huntrix	32.1 million
October 4	"Golden"	Huntrix	33.8 million
October 11	"Golden"	Huntrix	32.3 million
October 18	"The Fate of Ophelia"	Taylor Swift	92.5 million
October 25	"The Fate of Ophelia"	Taylor Swift	49.1 million
November 1	"The Fate of Ophelia"	Taylor Swift	33.6 million
November 8	"The Fate of Ophelia"	Taylor Swift	29.1 million
November 15	"Golden"	Huntrix	29.4 million
November 22	"The Fate of Ophelia"	Taylor Swift	26.2 million
November 29	"The Fate of Ophelia"	Taylor Swift	23.4 million
December 6	"The Fate of Ophelia"	Taylor Swift	21.6 million
December 13	"All I Want for Christmas Is You"	Mariah Carey	33.7 million
December 20	"All I Want for Christmas Is You"	Mariah Carey	39.5 million
December 27	"All I Want for Christmas Is You"	Mariah Carey	43.6 million

== See also ==
- 2025 in American music
- List of Billboard Hot 100 number ones of 2025
