= Album-equivalent unit =

Measurement unit in the music industry

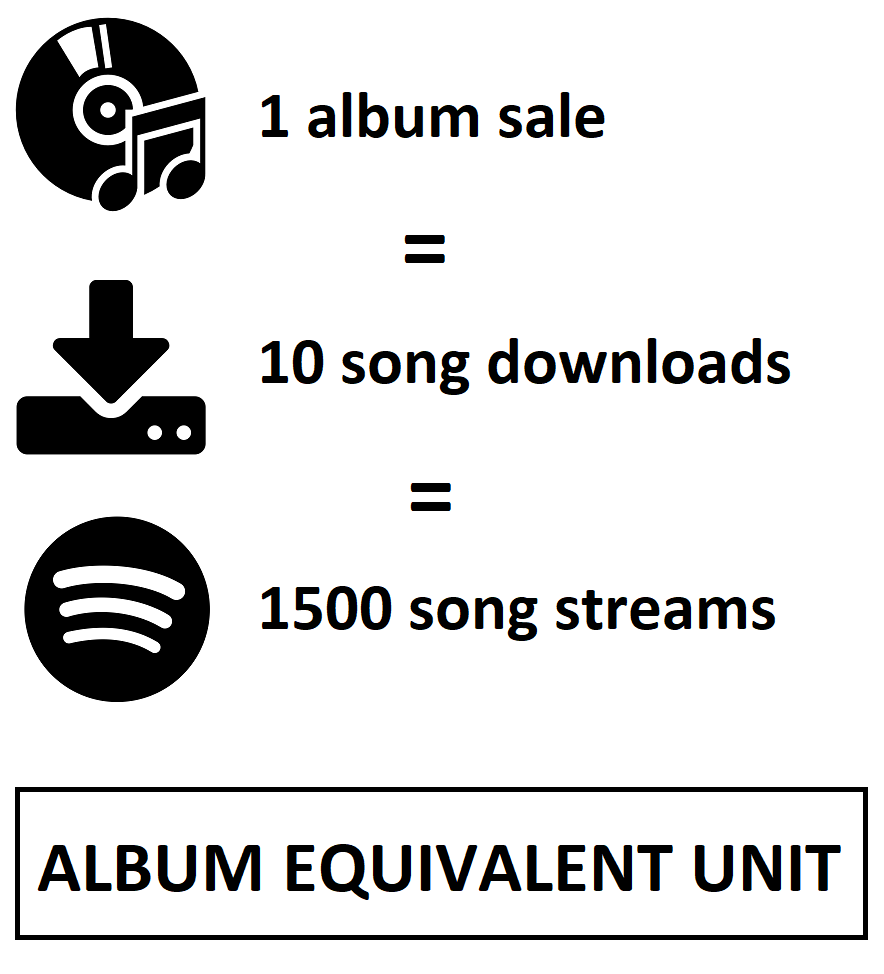
The standard of an album-equivalent unit in the United States, according to the RIAA

The album-equivalent unit, or album equivalent, often shortened to just unit, is a sales metric in the music industry that defines the number of songs streamed and songs downloaded equal to one album sale. The album-equivalent unit was introduced in the mid-2010s as an answer to the drop of album sales in the 21st century. Album sales more than halved from 1999 to 2009, declining from a $14.6 to a $6.3 billion industry, partly due to cheap digitally downloaded singles. For instance, the only albums that went platinum in the United States in 2014 were the Frozen soundtrack and Taylor Swift's 1989, whereas several albums had gone platinum in 2013.

The use of album-equivalent units transformed the music charts from a ranking of best-selling albums into a ranking of most popular albums. The International Federation of the Phonographic Industry (IFPI) have used album-equivalent unit to measure their Global Recording Artist of the Year since 2013.

== Terminology ==
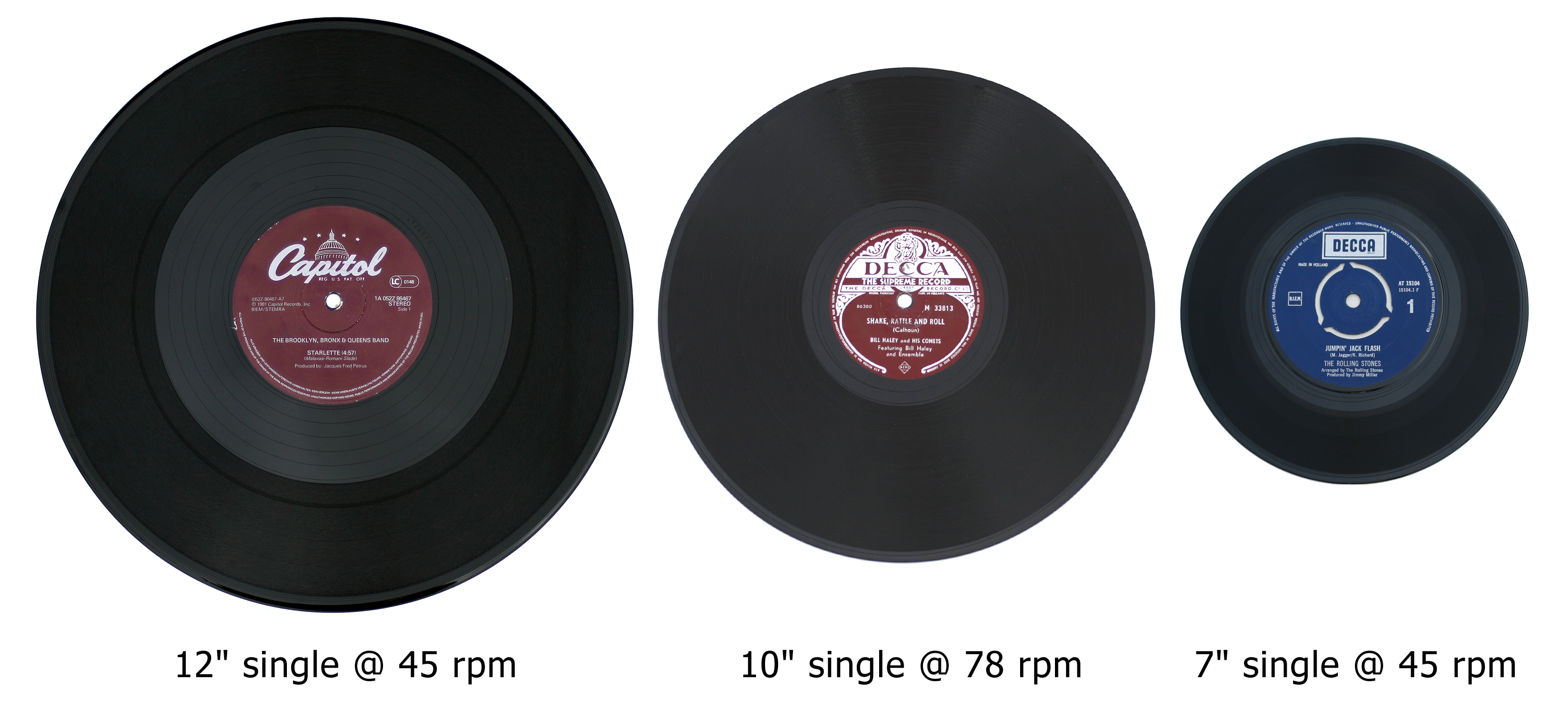
Prior to digital era, the IFPI counted three physical singles (pictured) as an equivalent of one album.

The term album-equivalent unit had been used by the International Federation of the Phonographic Industry (IFPI) long before the streaming era began. Between 1994 and 2005, the IFPI counted three physical singles as an equivalent of one album unit in their annual Recording Industry in Numbers (RIN) report. The term was reintroduced by the IFPI in 2013 to measure their Global Recording Artist of the Year. By this point, the album-equivalent units had already included music downloads and streams. An alternative term of album equivalent unit is sales plus streaming (SPS) unit, which was introduced by Hits magazine.

== Use on record charts and certifications ==
=== United States ===
Beginning with the December 13, 2014 issue, the Billboard 200 albums chart revised its ranking methodology with album-equivalent unit instead of pure album sales. With this overhaul, the Billboard 200 includes on-demand streaming and digital track sales (as measured by Nielsen SoundScan) by way of a new algorithm, using data from all of the major on-demand audio subscription services including Spotify, Apple Music, Google Play, YouTube and formerly Xbox Music. Known as TEA (track equivalent album) and SEA (streaming equivalent album) when originally implemented, 10 song sales or 1,500 song streams from an album were treated as equivalent to one purchase of the album. Billboard continues to publish a pure album sales chart, called Top Album Sales, that maintains the traditional Billboard 200 methodology, based exclusively on Nielsen SoundScan's sales data. Taylor Swift's 1989 was the first album to top the chart with this methodology, generating 339,000 album-equivalent units (281,000 units came from pure album sales). In Billboard's February 8, 2015, issue, Now That's What I Call Music! 53 became the first album in history to miss the top position of the Billboard 200 despite being the best-selling album of the week.

Similarly the Recording Industry Association of America (RIAA), which had previously certified albums based on units sold to retail stores, began factoring streaming for their certifications in February 2016.

In July 2018, Billboard and Nielsen revised the ratios used for streaming equivalent album units to account for the relative value of streams on paid music services like Apple Music or Amazon Music Unlimited versus ad-supported music and video platforms such as Spotify's free tier and YouTube. Under the updated album equivalent ratios, 1,250 premium audio streams, 3,750 ad-supported streams, or 3,750 video streams are equal to one album unit.

=== United Kingdom ===
In the United Kingdom, the Official Charts Company has included streaming into the UK Albums Chart since March 2015. The change was decided after the massive growth of streaming; the number of tracks streamed in the UK in a year doubled from 7.5 billion in 2013 to just under 15 billion in 2014. Under the new methodology, Official Charts Company takes the 12 most-streamed tracks from an album, with the top two songs being given lesser weight so that the figure will reflect the popularity of the album as a whole rather than of one or two successful singles. The adjusted total is divided by 1000 and added to the album sales figure. Sam Smith's In the Lonely Hour was the first album to top the chart with this rule. Out of its 41,000 album-equivalent units, 2,900 units came from streaming and the rest were pure sales. By 2017, streaming had accounted more than half of album-equivalent units in the UK, according to British Phonographic Industry (BPI).

=== Germany ===
In Germany, streaming began to be included on the albums chart since February 2016. Nevertheless, the German Albums Chart is used to rank the albums based on weekly revenue, instead of units. Hence, only paid streaming is counted and must be played at least 30 seconds. At least 6 tracks of one album have to be streamed to make streams count for the album, with 12 tracks being the maximum counted. Similar to the UK chart rule, the actual streams of the top-two songs are not counted, but instead the average of the following tracks.

=== Australia ===
The Australian Recording Industry Association, which issues the ARIA Charts, began incorporating streaming into its singles chart beginning on November 24, 2014, and its albums chart beginning on May 13, 2017. ARIA changes the conversion rate regularly, and as of July 2023, one sale is equivalent to 170 streams on a paid subscription service, or 420 streams on an ad-supported service.

== Responses and criticism ==
According to Silvio Pietroluongo, vice president of charts and data development at Billboard, album equivalent units methodology "reflects album popularity in today's world, where music is accessible on so many platforms [and] has become the accepted measure of album success." Physical albums have mostly turned into collector's items as noted by a 2016 poll by ICM Research, which found that nearly half of the surveyed people did not listen to the record they bought.

In Forbes, Hugh McIntyre noted that the usage of album equivalent units has resulted in artists releasing albums with excessive track lists. Brian Josephs from Spin said: "If you're a thirsty (eager for fame or notoriety) pop artist of note, you can theoretically game the system by packing as many as 20 tracks into an album, in the process rolling up more album-equivalent units—and thus album "sales"—as listeners check the album out." He also criticized Chris Brown's album Heartbreak on a Full Moon, which contains over 40 songs.

Rolling Stone columnist Tim Ingham observed the figures of Drake's Scorpion and found that 63% of the album's streams on Spotify came from just three songs off the 25-track album. Additionally, only six songs accounted for 82% of the album's total stream, meaning that only a quarter of the songs determined the overall success of the album in terms of album-equivalent units. Cherie Hu from NPR felt that album equivalent units often do not reflect the actual album because they put further weight on an album's biggest single(s) rather than on all the project's tracks as a whole.

== Digital song weighting ==
=== Track-equivalent unit ===
The track-equivalent unit (or track equivalent) is a measure of song streams converted to one track unit (equal to one song download). Due to significant growth of streaming, the IFPI used track equivalents for its global singles charts between 2013 and 2019. The same year, the RIAA began using track equivalent for digital single certification with 150 streams of audio or video being equal to one song download.

=== Stream equivalent ===
A reverse of the track equivalent, the stream equivalent (or subscription-stream equivalent) is used to convert a song download into a streaming figure. Stream equivalent is also a measure of weighted ad-supported streams to equal premium streams. For Billboard charts, Luminate counts 1 subscription stream equal to 4.5 ad-supported streams or 1/200 song downloads. The IFPI began implementing the terminology in 2020, ranking "Blinding Lights" by the Weeknd as the biggest global single of the year, with 2.72 billion subscription-stream equivalents.

== See also ==
- Album sales
