= Streaming Songs =

Billboard chart

The Streaming Songs chart is released weekly by Billboard magazine and lists each week's top streamed radio songs, on-demand songs and videos on leading online music services in the United States. The chart represents one of the three components, along with airplay (Hot 100 Airplay) and sales (Hot Digital Songs and Hot Singles Sales), that determine the chart positions of songs on the Billboard Hot 100, which ranks the most popular songs in the United States.

Billboard editorial director Bill Werde said that "Harlem Shake"'s success prompted them to enact the chart policy after two years of discussions with YouTube". The first number-one song on the chart was "Thrift Shop" by Macklemore & Ryan Lewis featuring Wanz on January 19, 2013.

== Lists of number ones ==
- 2013
- 2014
- 2015
- 2016
- 2017
- 2018
- 2019
- 2020
- 2021
- 2022
- 2023
- 2024
- 2025
- 2026

== Chart achievements ==
=== Songs with the most weeks at number one ===
Number of weeks	Artist	Song	Year(s)	Source
27	Ella Langley	"Choosin' Texas"	2026	
26	Mariah Carey	"All I Want for Christmas Is You"	2019–22, 2024–26	
20	Lil Nas X featuring Billy Ray Cyrus	"Old Town Road"	2019	
19	Morgan Wallen	"Last Night"	2023	
16	Luis Fonsi and Daddy Yankee featuring Justin Bieber	"Despacito"	2017	
14	Desiigner	"Panda"	2016	
14	Post Malone featuring 21 Savage	"Rockstar"	2017	
13	Miley Cyrus	"Wrecking Ball"	2013–14	
13	Iggy Azalea featuring Charli XCX	"Fancy"	2014	
13	Roddy Ricch	"The Box"	2020	
13	Carolina Gaitán, Mauro Castillo, Adassa, Rhenzy Feliz, Diane Guerrero, Stephanie Beatriz, and the Encanto cast	"We Don't Talk About Bruno"	2022	
12	Mark Ronson featuring Bruno Mars	"Uptown Funk"	2015	
12	The Chainsmokers featuring Halsey	"Closer"	2016	
12	Huntrix: Ejae, Audrey Nuna and Rei Ami	"Golden"	2025	
11	Miley Cyrus	"We Can't Stop"	2013	
10	Meghan Trainor	"All About That Bass"	2014	
10	Silentó	"Watch Me"	2015	
10	Migos featuring Lil Uzi Vert	"Bad and Boujee"	2017	
10	DaBaby featuring Roddy Ricch	"Rockstar"	2020	
10	Cardi B featuring Megan Thee Stallion	"WAP"	2020	

=== Highest stream peaks ===
- 143 million, "Old Town Road" – Lil Nas X featuring Billy Ray Cyrus (April 20, 2019)
- 116.2 million, "In My Feelings" – Drake (July 28, 2018)
- 103.1 million, "Harlem Shake" – Baauer (March 2, 2013)
- 101.7 million, "God's Plan" – Drake (March 3, 2018)
- 93.8 million, “Thank U, Next” — Ariana Grande (November 17, 2018)
- 93 million, "WAP" – Cardi B featuring Megan Thee Stallion (August 22, 2020)
- 92.5 million, "The Fate of Ophelia" – Taylor Swift (October 18, 2025)
- 85.3 million, "7 Rings" – Ariana Grande (February 2, 2019)
- 84.5 million, "Look What You Made Me Do" – Taylor Swift (September 16, 2017)
- 77.2 million, "The Box" – Roddy Ricch (January 25, 2020)
- 76.4 million, "I Had Some Help" – Post Malone featuring Morgan Wallen (May 25, 2024)
- 76.2 million, “Fortnight” — Taylor Swift featuring Post Malone (May 4, 2024)
- 76.1 million, "Drivers License" – Olivia Rodrigo (January 23, 2021)

=== Artists with the most number-one songs ===
Rank	Artist	Songs	Source
1	Drake	23	
2	Taylor Swift	12	
3	Kendrick Lamar	7	
3	Justin Bieber	7	
4	Ariana Grande	6	
5	Travis Scott	5	
5	Morgan Wallen	5	
6	Cardi B	4	
6	Miley Cyrus	4	
6	Lil Baby	4	
6	Megan Thee Stallion	4	
6	Post Malone	4	
6	Beyoncé	4	
6	Kanye West	4	
6	The Weeknd	4	

=== Artists with the most weeks at number one ===
Rank	Artist	Weeks	Source
1	Drake	64	
2	Justin Bieber	36	
3	Morgan Wallen	30	
4	Miley Cyrus	29	
4	Taylor Swift	29	
6	Mariah Carey	26	
6	Ella Langley	26	
8	Lil Nas X	24	
8	Kendrick Lamar	24	
10	Roddy Ricch	23	
11	Ariana Grande	21	
12	Billy Ray Cyrus	20	
13	Post Malone	19	
13	21 Savage	19	

== Selected additional Streaming Songs achievements ==
- Mariah Carey's "All I Want for Christmas Is You" is the first holiday song to reach number one on Streaming Songs. It achieved this on the chart dated January 5, 2019, with 51.9 million streams. Brenda Lee's "Rockin' Around the Christmas Tree" reached number one on Streaming Songs on the chart dated January 7, 2023, with 46.87 million streams.
- Brenda Lee's "Rockin' Around the Christmas Tree" is the oldest song to reach the top of the Streaming Songs chart, being released in 1958. It is also the longest time from debuting on the chart to reaching the top, sitting at the top of the summit over 7 years later. Furthermore, it is the song with the longest climb to number one, taking 43 weeks to reach the summit.
- Lil Nas X and Billy Ray Cyrus' "Old Town Road" is the first song to garner over 100 million streams in nine separate weeks.
- Cardi B's "WAP" featuring Megan Thee Stallion holds the record for greatest first-week streams, with 93 million.
- Bad Bunny and Chencho Corleone' "Me Porto Bonito" is the first song completely in Spanish to reach number one on Streaming Songs. It achieved this on the chart dated July 30, 2022, with 21.1 million streams.
- Taylor Swift and Drake share the record of being the only artists ever to hold the entire top ten of the chart in a week and the only artists to have debuted ten songs in the top ten simultaneously.
- Huntrix is the first fictional group and girl group to reach number one.
