= Now That's What I Call Music! 53 (American series) =

Compilation album by various artists
- Released: February 3, 2015
- Length: 74:24
- Label: Sony Music Entertainment

Numbered series chronology
Now That's What I Call Music! 52 (2014)	Now That's What I Call Music! 53 (2015)	Now That's What I Call Music! 54 (2015)

Now That's What I Call Music! 53 is the 53rd edition of the Now series in the United States. It was released on February 3, 2015. It features 21 tracks including the Billboard Hot 100 number-one hit "Uptown Funk".

Now 53 debuted at number 2 on the Billboard 200 chart with 99,000 copies sold in its first week. As of July 2015, the compilation has sold 451,000 copies. It became the first album in history to miss the top position of the Billboard 200 despite being the best-selling album of the week.

== Track listing ==
No.	Title	Artist	Length
1.	"Uptown Funk"	Mark Ronson feat. Bruno Mars	4:27
2.	"Lips are Movin"	Meghan Trainor	2:59
3.	"Animals"	Maroon 5	3:51
4.	"Don't"	Ed Sheeran	3:36
5.	"Habits (Stay High)"	Tove Lo	3:25
6.	"Love Me Harder"	Ariana Grande and The Weeknd	3:50
7.	"I'm Not the Only One"	Sam Smith	3:21
8.	"Steal My Girl"	One Direction	3:45
9.	"The Heart Wants What It Wants"	Selena Gomez	3:43
10.	"Trumpets"	Jason Derulo	3:33
11.	"Beg for It"	Iggy Azalea featuring MØ	2:56
12.	"I Don't Mind"	Usher feat. Juicy J	4:08
13.	"Boom Clap"	Charli XCX	2:47
14.	"Waves" (Robin Schulz Radio Edit)	Mr. Probz	3:24
15.	"Blame"	Calvin Harris feat. John Newman	3:25
16.	"A Sky Full of Stars"	Coldplay	4:28
17.	"Shut Up and Dance"	WALK THE MOON	3:16
18.	"Knock Me Out"	Fancy Reagan	3:22
19.	"Uncover"	Zara Larsson	3:31
20.	"Who are You Loving Now?"	Danny Mercer	3:31
21.	"Hold the Line"	Jack and Eliza	2:56

== Reception ==
Professional ratings
Review scores
Source	Rating
AllMusic	3/5 stars

According to Andy Kellman of AllMusic, the number-one song, "Uptown Funk", leads the way in this compilation of hits from late 2014/early 2015 "followed by a succession of singles that fared either nearly or just as well."

== Charts ==
=== Weekly charts ===
Chart (2015)	Peak position
US Billboard 200	2

=== Year-end charts ===
Chart (2015)	Position
US Billboard 200	51
