= Official Albums Streaming Chart =

UK music chart

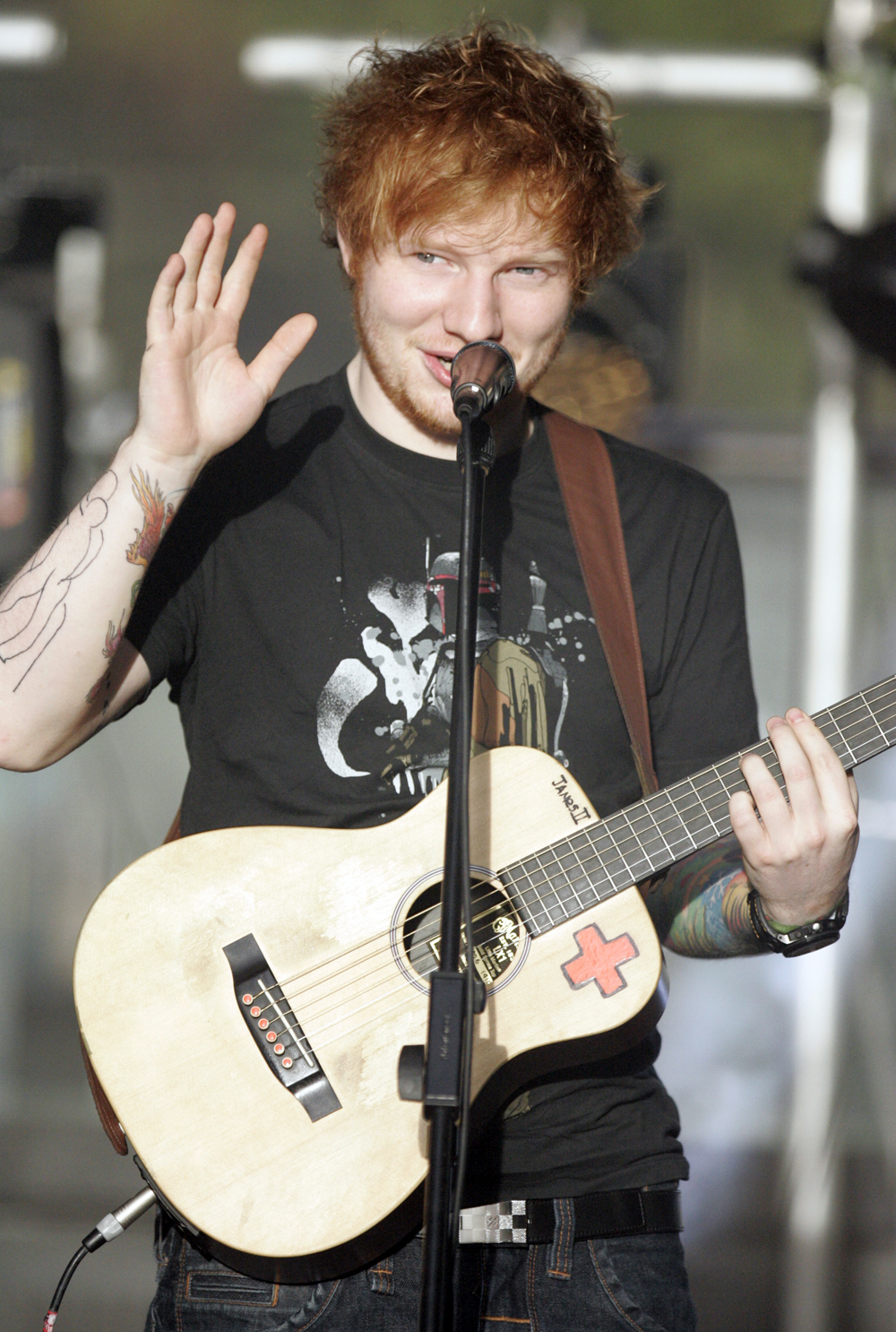
Ed Sheeran achieved the first number one on the Official Albums Streaming Chart with x.

The Official Albums Streaming Chart is a music chart based plays of an album's songs through audio streaming services (such as Spotify, Deezer, Google Play Music, Tidal and Apple Music) in the United Kingdom. Introduced on 1 March 2015, it coincided with the Official Charts Company's decision to incorporate streaming data into the UK Albums Chart. The Official Albums Streaming Chart uses the same streaming sources as the Official Audio Streaming Chart to measure how many times albums have been streamed each week.

The formula for calculating the Official Albums Streaming Chart takes the total number of streams from the twelve most streamed tracks on the standard version of an album and subtracts the difference between the two most streamed tracks and the average of the rest (to avoid hit singles boosting album sales). This is equivalent to 12 times the average number of streams of the third to twelfth most streamed tracks.

Official Charts Company chief executive Martin Talbot stated: "The Official Charts Company's mission is to compile the most accurate, reliable and up-to-date charts around, and in 2015 that means reflecting the popularity of streaming, alongside downloads, vinyl and – still the most popular album format – the CD. Initial indications are that the impact on actual chart positions will be modest to begin with, but we expect this to grow as streaming becomes increasingly popular."

The first album to top the streaming chart was Ed Sheeran's second album x, which topped the chart on 1 March 2015 with streaming sales of 3,369. Sheeran's third album ÷ has spent the most weeks at number one on the chart, with 34 weeks as of December 2017, and the most consecutive weeks with 26.
