= Beyoncé 2024 NFL Halftime Show =

2024 show headlined by Beyoncé

- Netflix poster
- Date: December 25, 2024
- Location: Houston, Texas, United States
- Venue: NRG Stadium
- Headliner: Beyoncé
- Special guests: Tanner Adell; Reyna Roberts; Tiera Kennedy; Brittney Spencer; Blue Ivy Carter; Shaboozey; Post Malone
- Director: Beyoncé; Alex Rudzinski
- Producer: Parkwood Entertainment; Jesse Collins Entertainment

The NFL 2024 Christmas Day Halftime Show, also dubbed the Beyoncé Bowl, was the halftime entertainment for the Baltimore Ravens vs. Houston Texans game, which took place on December 25, 2024, at the NRG Stadium in Houston, Texas. The show was headlined by singer Beyoncé and marked the first halftime show for an NFL Christmas Day game.

Produced by Beyoncé's production company Parkwood Entertainment in collaboration with Jesse Collins Entertainment, the performance featured first-time performances of songs from Cowboy Carter (2024), with guest spots from collaborators Tanner Adell, Brittney Spencer, Tiera Kennedy, Reyna Roberts, Shaboozey, and Post Malone. The show was conceived as a tribute to Texan rodeo culture and Black Southern and Western history, and featured over 500 performers including Western cultural figures such as Melanie Rivera, Myrtis Dightman, Nikki Woodward, Ja'Dayia Kursh, and Texas Southern University's Ocean of Soul Marching Band.

The show broke several viewership records and was praised by critics for its direction, staging, and themes. It received five nominations at the 77th Primetime Emmy Awards, winning for Outstanding Costumes for a Variety, Nonfiction, or Reality Programming. The performance was released as a standalone special on Netflix. On February 2, 2025, it was updated with an addendum announcing the Cowboy Carter Tour. Snoop Dogg headlined the following year's second-ever Christmas halftime show.

== Background ==
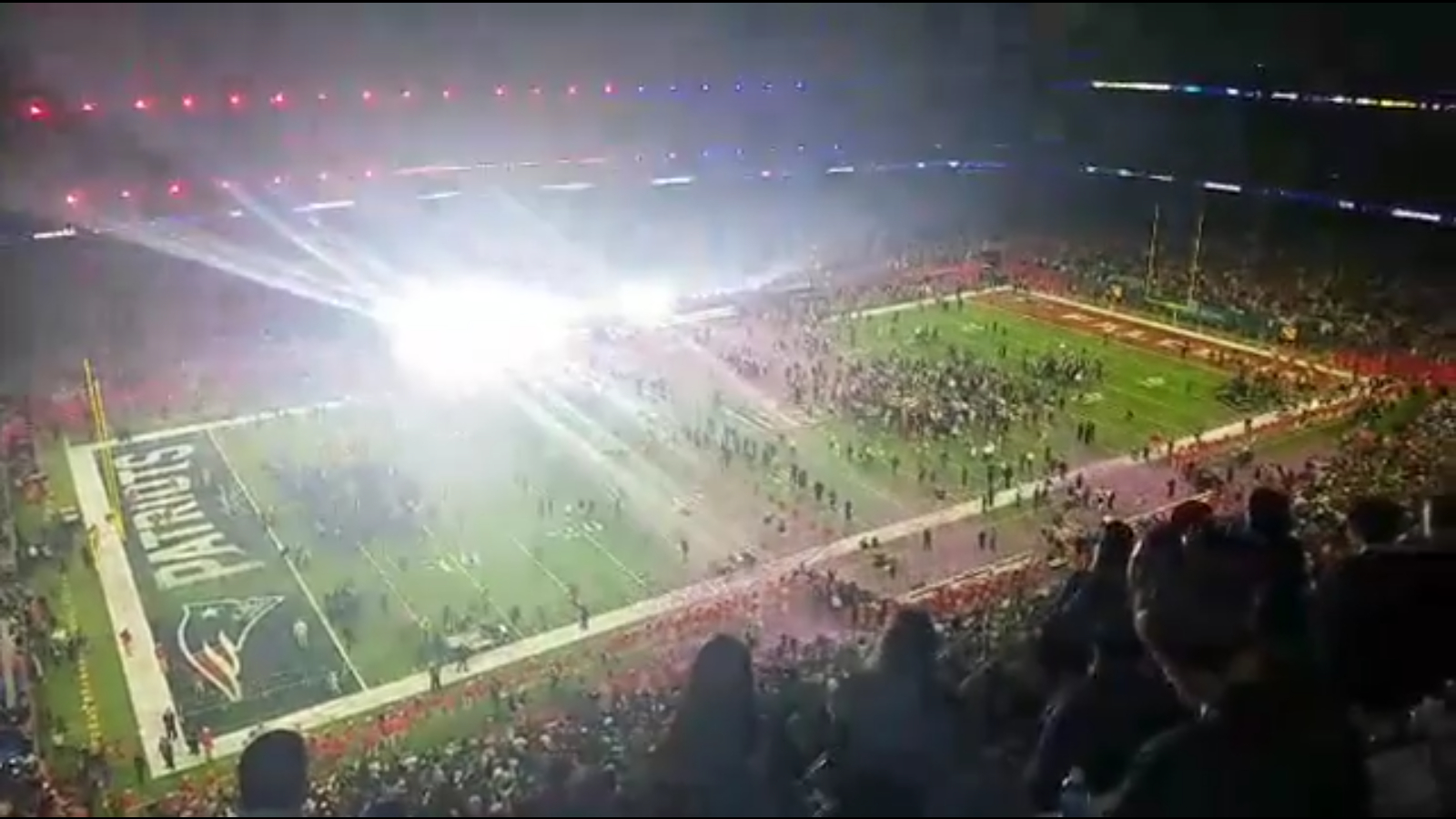
The performance took place at NRG Stadium in Beyoncé's hometown of Houston, Texas

On November 18, 2024, it was announced that American singer-songwriter Beyoncé would headline the first ever Christmas Gameday halftime show at the 2024 Christmas Day game between the Baltimore Ravens and Houston Texans, featuring songs from her most recent album, Cowboy Carter (2024). The Christmas Gameday was the first NFL game to be broadcast on Netflix, with reports that Netflix enlisted Beyoncé to create a cultural event and boost audience ratings as it expands its advertising business.

Some fans raised concerns about the potential for buffering issues during the halftime show, due to similar issues during Netflix's airing of Jake Paul and Mike Tyson's boxing match. Netflix told a CNN representative that they had optimized their technology to prevent this. On December 4, Beyoncé's mother Tina Knowles stated that "[she had] no worries. God is going to be in control and everything is going to go smooth. No glitches. It's going to be great," and added that "[she] just left 25 meetings today. It's meeting after meeting. What goes into it is unbelievable".

To announce the performance, Beyoncé released a teaser video showing her catching a football, standing atop a rose-covered car as a snippet of Cowboy Carter track "Ameriican Requiem" plays. A second teaser was released on December 11, 2024, in which Beyoncé uses a finger gun to activate lights around a cactus decorated like a Christmas tree. A third and final teaser was released on December 24, the day before the performance, in which Beyoncé mimics playing a banjo as "Texas Hold 'Em" plays, before a fake buffering icon appears and she giggles.

== Development ==
=== Conception ===
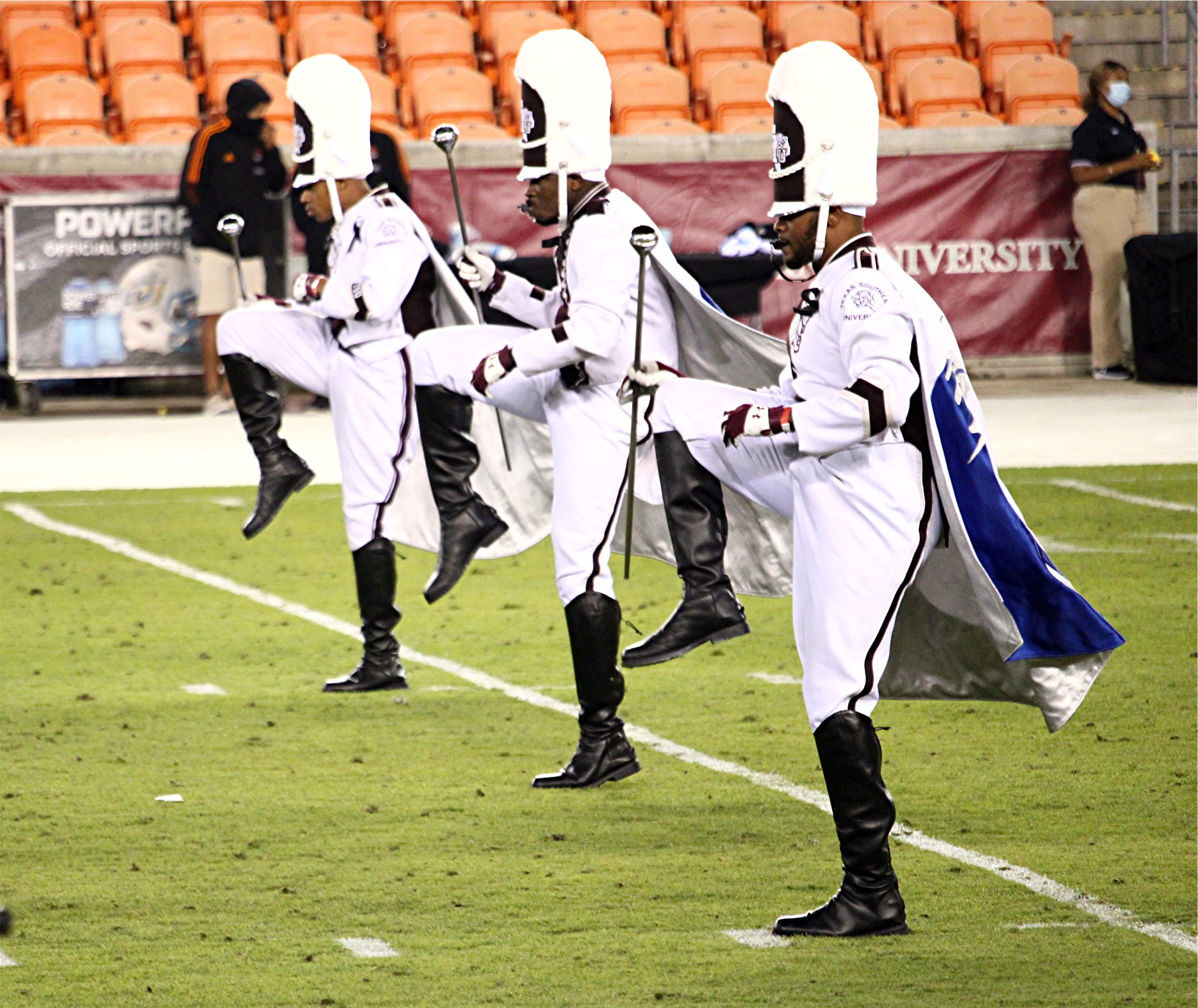
The performance featured 200 members of Texas Southern University's Ocean of Soul Marching Band

The spectacle was envisioned to pay tribute to Western and Rodeo culture displayed as a Christmas parade, with Beyoncé including several special guests such as Mexican cowgirl Melanie Rivera, bull-riding legend Myrtis Dightman, Miss Rodeo Texas Princess 2004 and Miss Rodeo Texas 2015 Nikki Woodward, and the first Black Rodeo Queen in Arkansas, Ja'Dayia Kursh. Joining them in the stage field during a rousing caravan were Houston Texans owner Cal McNair and his wife Hannah.

Nearly 200 members of the Ocean of Soul Marching Band from Texas Southern University, a public historically black university (HBCU) in Houston, participated as the live musicians, with the Houston Texans Cheerleaders additionally performing as majorettes. Charm La'Donna and Tyrik J. Patterson were the leading choreographers of the halftime performance, while Parris Goebel was in charge of the "Sweet Honey Buckin'" breakdown.

=== Fashion ===
Keeping with the Cowboy Carter thematic attire, the show featured Western-driven couture stylized by Shiona Turini, who was also the main wardrobe collaborator of the Renaissance World Tour. Beyoncé wore a white Lindsey James Show Clothing bodysuit and matching chaps paired with an archival feather coat by Roberto Cavalli, Lorraine Schwartz jewelry and Christian Louboutin boots. According to Business Insider, the look resembled "the pattern of a mariachi singer".

A custom cowboy hat was designed by ASN, a Los Angeles-based brand founded by Mexican-American sisters Alejandra Georgevich and Ilsse Nevarez from Texas. The piece was made using sustainable virgin wool cleaned, scoured, and dyed by hand.

Beyoncé's daughter Blue Ivy Carter was dressed in Akira boots and a custom ensemble with sparkling details throughout by Ukrainian designer Ivan Frolov, while additional prêt-à-porter garments by Dolce & Gabbana, boots by Italian shoes brand Paris Texas, and Stetson cowboy hats were worn by the female guest performers.

== Synopsis ==
At the start of the halftime show, Beyoncé appeared on the stadium corridors riding atop a white horse, opening her set with "16 Carriages". She was then joined by Tanner Adell, Brittney Spencer, Tiera Kennedy and Reyna Roberts for their cover of the Beatles' "Blackbird". Beyoncé entered the field stage through a three-star-shaped stadium hallway surrounded by white Cadillacs to sing a rendition of "Ya Ya" upon a stage platform resembling an open carriage, with dancers wearing sashes branded "Cowboy Carter". She performed "My House" alongside the dancers including Blue Ivy and a full African-American marching band.

The stage field formation became a "HBCU marching band holiday parade", while Shaboozey joined Beyoncé to sing a choreographed mashup of "Spaghettii" and "Riiverdance" before performing "Sweet Honey Buckiin" (with "Honey" omitted). Post Malone joined her on a denim-covered truck for a duet of "Levii's Jeans". Beyoncé then sat atop the back seat of a moving Cadillac to sing her cover version of "Jolene". "Texas Hold 'Em" was performed as the closing song accompanied by a honky tonk-inspired choreography with bandanas. Beyoncé was lifted into the air on a narrow platform above the midfield, and finished the set dropping a huge banner flag beneath the platform that read "bang".

== Critical reception ==
The halftime show was met with critical acclaim. Billboard described it as a "stunning, one-of-a-kind" tribute to her Texan roots, her community, and the legacy of Black Southerners in culture and music. Rolling Stone's Charisma Madarang described the performance as "electrifying" and "sensational", while The Daily Telegraph's Ed Power called it an "eye-popping, mind-blowing" extravaganza. Ben Beaumont-Thomas of The Guardian praised the all-white costumes worn by Beyoncé and her dancers and guests, characterizing them as "dazzling" and "theatrical". In a review for CBS Sports, Shanna McCarriston wrote that it captured both "the spirit of Texas" and "the spirit of Cowboy Carter".

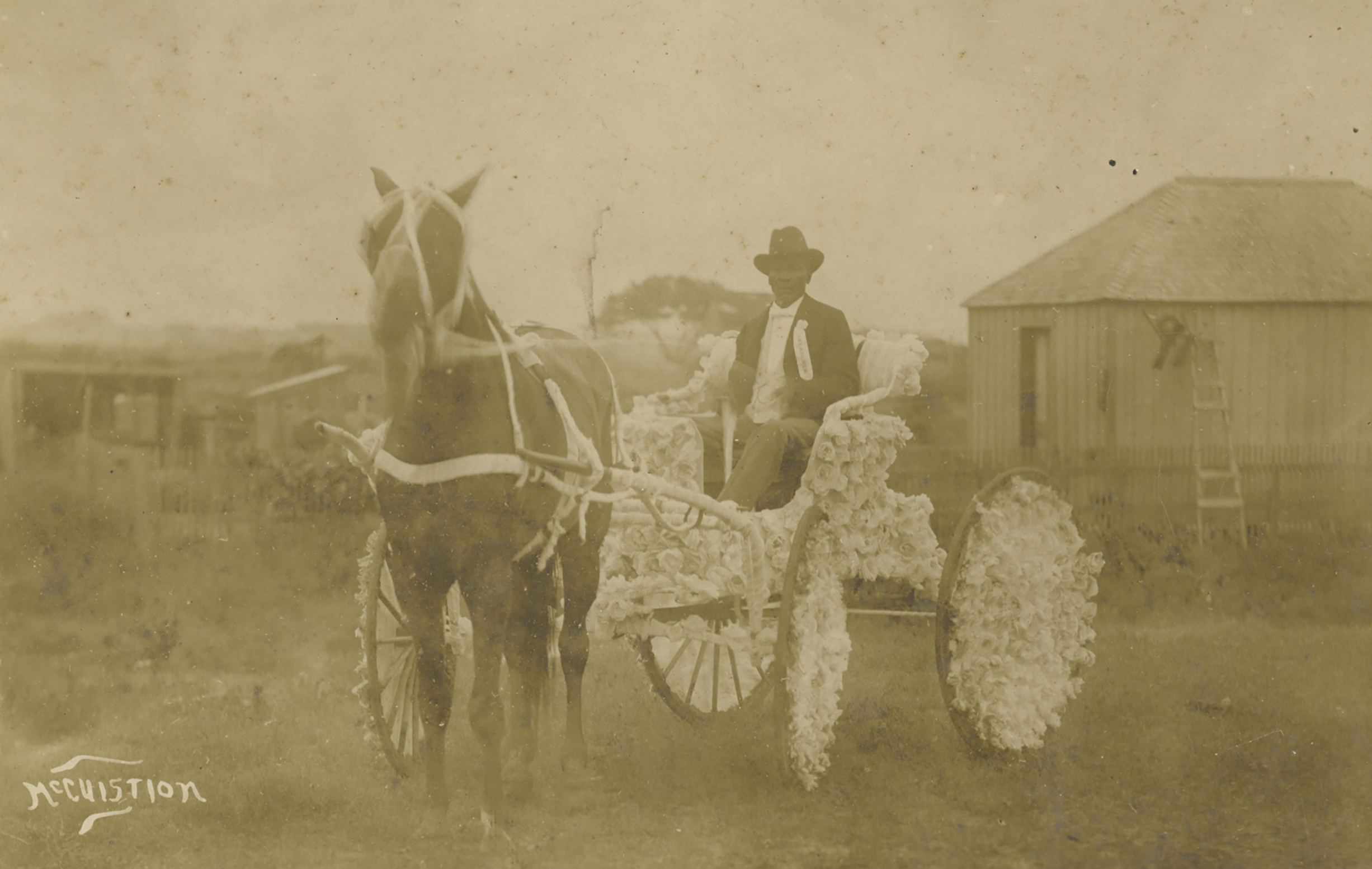
The show received praise for its direction and production design, with its use of flower-covered carriages seen as an homage to early Juneteenth parades, as pictured above

The New York Times' Lindsay Zoladz lauded the "impressive" production design of the show, describing it as "magnificently artful in its staging, background details and composition" and reflective of its concept as a "big-tent reimagining of country music and Southern culture". Zoladz added that the show was a "stunning showcase" of a large number of musicians, dancers and extras "that rivaled a cinematic blockbuster", with Beyoncé being eager to share the spotlight with rising Black country artists and local performers. Writing for Rolling Stone, Larisha Paul also praised the show's dynamic production design, highlighting the use of floating platforms, horses, special guests, a denim-covered pickup truck, and a marching band, as well as flower-covered carriages, which was an homage to those used in the earliest Juneteenth parades in Texas from 1895 to the early 1900s.

== Viewership ==
The halftime show broke several viewership records. It helped the game become the most-watched NFL game on record since 2001, with U.S. live viewership peaking at 27 million during Beyoncé's performance. Netflix's chief content officer Bela Bajaria called it a "record-breaking day" and "the best Christmas gift we could have delivered". Within 10 days, a further 50 million people had watched the Beyoncé Bowl special on Netflix. As of February 25, 2026, Beyoncé's halftime show has been removed from her official YouTube channel as well as the official NFL YouTube channel. The Christmas Halftime show is also no longer available to stream on Netflix. This has occurred with no prior explanation.

== Impact ==
Beyoncé Bowl signalled "the future of concert streaming", according to live music industry publication IQ Magazine, with the show opening a new market for streaming platforms to provide long-term viewing opportunities for high-demand performances.

Publications reported that Beyoncé's performance elevated NFL Christmas Gameday to a level of cultural relevance akin to the Super Bowl, creating a new holiday tradition and changing how viewers watch sports broadcasting. The Hollywood Reporter said that the performance was "so electric" that it solidified another "sought-after spectacle" and "pop culture golden moment" for the NFL in addition to the Super Bowl halftime show, while Inc. said that the performance also ensured success for Netflix's venture into live sports broadcasting, delivering the streaming platform a cultural moment that amounted to a "Christmas miracle". Similarly, PRWeek commented:

"Beyoncé Bowl redefined what a regular-season game can achieve in terms of viewership and advertising... A game that might have once gone unnoticed is now a case study because it capitalized on two of the most important advertising territories — sports entertainment and cultural events — and it created a new era of halftime show-style events."

The hashtag #BeyoncéBowl rose to the #1 worldwide trending topic on X/Twitter immediately as the performance commenced, above #Christmas. By the end of the performance, it occupied 10 of the top 12 trending topics in the U.S. The performance also triggered conversations and analyses on the history of Black people in country music and Western culture, with news media such as The Guardian, The New York Times, and The Week publishing articles on the topic.

== Accolades ==
List of accolades
Year	Award/organization	Category	Title	Result	Ref.
2025	Primetime Emmy Awards	Outstanding Variety Special (Live)	Beyoncé Bowl	Nominated	
2025	Primetime Emmy Awards	Outstanding Directing for a Variety Special	Beyoncé Knowles-Carter and Alex Rudzinski	Nominated	
2025	Primetime Emmy Awards	Outstanding Production Design for a Variety Special	Willo Perron, Brian Stonestreet, Gloria Lamb, Jonathan Stoller-Schoff, and Marina Skye	Nominated	
2025	Primetime Emmy Awards	Outstanding Choreography for Variety or Reality Programming	Truck Patterson, Charm La'Donna, Christopher Grant, and Parris Goebel	Nominated	
2025	Primetime Emmy Awards	Outstanding Costumes for a Variety, Nonfiction, or Reality Programming	Beyoncé Knowles-Carter, Shiona Turini, Erica Rice, Molly Peters, Chelsea Staebell and Timothy White	Won	

== Set list ==
The following songs were performed during the halftime show. (Note: Per multiple sources:)

1. "16 Carriages"
2. "Blackbiird" (with Tanner Adell, Brittney Spencer, Tiera Kennedy, and Reyna Roberts)
3. "Ya Ya" (contains elements of "Freedom")
4. "My House"
5. "Riiverdance" (contains elements of "Spaghettii")
6. "Sweet Honey Buckiin'" (with Shaboozey)
7. "Levii's Jeans" (with Post Malone)
8. "Jolene" (contains elements of "Tyrant")
9. "Texas Hold 'Em" (contains elements of "Pony Up" remix and "Break My Soul")

== See also ==
- Super Bowl XLVII halftime show
- Super Bowl 50 halftime show
