= Ya Ya (Beyoncé song) =

2024 song by Beyoncé

Song by Beyoncé

from the album Cowboy Carter
- Released: March 29, 2024
- Studio: Westlake Recording (Los Angeles); Kings Landing West (Los Angeles)
- Genre: Rock and roll; psychedelic soul; funk; rockabilly; roots rock
- Length: 4:34
- Label: Parkwood; Columbia
- Songwriters: Harry Edwards; Oliver Rodigan; Beyoncé; Terius Gesteelde-Diamant; Shawn Carter; Anaïs Marinho; Klara Munk-Hansen
- Producers: Beyoncé; The-Dream

Lyric video
- "Ya Ya" on YouTube

"Ya Ya" is a song by American singer Beyoncé. It is the twentieth track on her eighth studio album, Cowboy Carter (2024), released through Parkwood Entertainment and Columbia Records. The song was written by Beyoncé, The-Dream, Jay-Z, Arlo Parks, Cadenza, Harry Edwards, and Klara Mkhatshwa Munk-Hansen, and produced by Beyoncé and The-Dream. The track interpolates Nancy Sinatra's "These Boots Are Made for Walkin'" (1966), written by Lee Hazlewood, and The Beach Boys' "Good Vibrations" (1966), written by Brian Wilson and Mike Love.

Characterized as a multi-genre song spanning across rock and roll, psychedelic soul, funk, rockabilly, and roots rock, "Ya Ya" focuses on Beyoncé's family history within the United States in the context of economic, racial and social inequality. Upon the album's release, the song debuted in the top 40 of the charts in the United States and the United Kingdom.

The song was widely lauded by music critics, including many who named it the best track on Cowboy Carter, with particular praise for its high-energy production and Beyoncé's wide-ranging vocal performance. The song was nominated for Best Americana Performance at the 67th Annual Grammy Awards.

== Background and composition ==
According to recording engineer DJ Swivel, Beyoncé had recorded an early version of "Ya Ya" during the creation of her fourth studio album, 4 (2011). The track did not make the final tracklist for 4, but was returned to and reworked for her eighth studio album, Cowboy Carter (2024). Elements of the original song, particularly the hook chant, were rewritten and included in the final track.

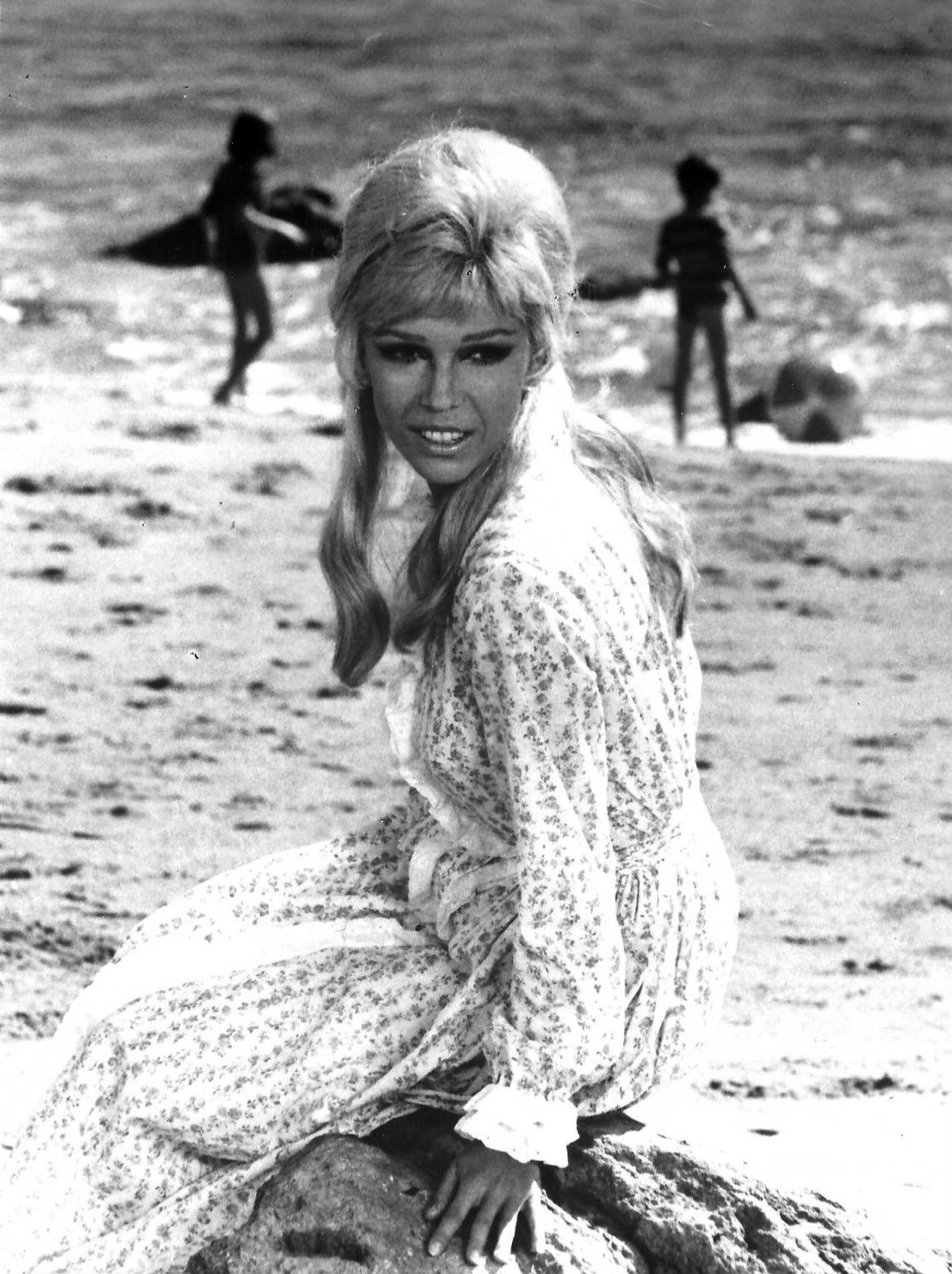
Nancy Sinatra said she was "delighted to be a tiny part" of "Ya Ya" after her song "These Boots Are Made for Walkin'" (1966) was interpolated on the track

"Ya Ya" was written by Beyoncé, The-Dream, Jay-Z, Arlo Parks, Cadenza, Harry Edwards, and Klara Mkhatshwa Munk-Hansen, and produced by Beyoncé and The-Dream. The song interpolates Nancy Sinatra's "These Boots Are Made for Walkin'" (1966), written by Lee Hazlewood, and The Beach Boys' "Good Vibrations" (1966), written by Brian Wilson and Mike Love. Nancy Sinatra commented on the interpolation following the song's release, writing: "To have a little piece of one of my records in a Beyoncé song is very meaningful to me because I love her. She represents what is great about today's music and I'm delighted to be a tiny part of it. This may be the best sample of "Boots" yet!"

"Ya Ya" traverses several genres, including psychedelic soul, rock and roll, funk, rockabilly, and roots rock. The song is preceded by the interlude "The Linda Martell Show" on the album, in which Linda Martell (the first Black woman to achieve commercial success in the country music genre) introduces the song as a "tune that stretches across a range of genres, and that's what makes it a unique listening experience".

Lyrically, the song explores Beyoncé's family's struggles in the context of American economic, racial and social inequalities, and promotes defiance, freedom and joy in the face of adversity. The song also evokes the Chitlin’ Circuit, which were a collection of venues that embraced and employed Black musicians during the Jim Crow era.

== Release and commercial performance ==
"Ya Ya" features as the twentieth track on Beyoncé's eighth studio album, Cowboy Carter, which was released on 29 March 2024, through Parkwood Entertainment and Columbia Records. After the release of the album, Ya Ya" debuted at number 39 on the US Billboard Hot 100 chart and number 33 on the UK Official Singles Charts.

== Reception ==
=== Critical response ===
"Ya Ya" received widespread acclaim from music critics, with several publications declaring it the best song on Cowboy Carter, including Rolling Stone, Billboard, Stereogum, USA Today, Elle, Slant, and The Daily Beast.

Many music critics praised Beyoncé's vocal performance on the track, noting how Beyoncé explored her full range of vocal abilities, ranging from "girlish" and "bouncy" to "explosive" and "rampaging". Lauding "Ya Ya" as a "world-rocking tour de force", Kyle Denis of Billboard wrote that Beyoncé "pushes herself vocally in ways that she never has before", adding: "This might be the closest a studio recording has gotten to capturing just how bombastic Beyoncé’s live vocals are." Kevin Fallon of The Daily Beast likened Beyoncé's voice to "a flame torch on the track", described the chorus as "irresistible" with its "cheeky directives", and concluded: "The thought of Beyoncé performing it live is so thrilling, I’m not sure I’d be able to handle it."

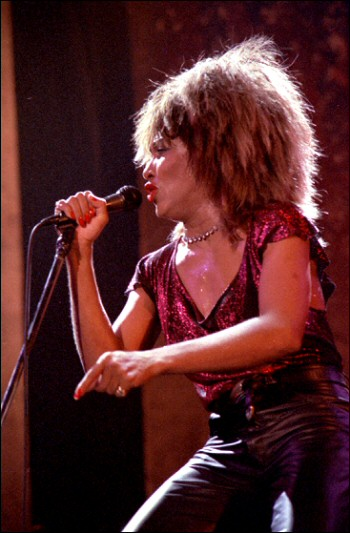
Several critics likened Beyoncé's performance on "Ya Ya" to 1960s revue performances by Tina Turner

Critics also praised the "high-energy", "playful", "passionate", and "unapologetically brash" nature of the track. Rolling Stone lauded "Ya Ya" as the "sonically adventurous and combustible peak of Cowboy Carter", in which Beyoncé evokes her musical inspirations to present her "wide-open idea of American music". Several critics compared Beyoncé's delivery and the song's structure to Tina Turner's 1960s revue performances, which NME's Jenessa Williams said was a "full-circle moment" that Beyoncé has been "building up to for years". Other publications likened Beyoncé's delivery on the track to that of Chuck Berry, Betty Davis, Elvis Presley, James Brown, Billy Preston, Little Richard, Koko Taylor, and Big Mama Thornton. Brittany Spanos of Rolling Stone described this as "fantasy-fulfillment", whereby Beyoncé transforms into the type of performers she was raised on and that she has often cited in her work.

Critics praised the lyrics of the song as inspiring "defiance", "resistance", "freedom" and "joy" in listeners. Billboard's Kyle Denis characterized the song as an "ode to the incomparable energy and verve of the Black South", while The Independent's Helen Brown described it as "Beyoncé's claim to life in America". In an article for Elle, Keyaira Kelly wrote that the track "paints a picture of Beyoncé's ideal America" as an inclusive, joyous hoedown.

=== Recognition ===
At the 67th Annual Grammy Awards the song was nominated for Best Americana Performance, becoming Beyoncé's first nomination in the category.

"Ya Ya" was included in various year-end lists of the best songs of 2024. Esquire ranked the song 4th, Rolling Stone ranked it 11th and Pitchfork readers ranked it 29th. Variety included it in their unranked list. In July 2024, it was included in The Guardian's list of 2024's songs of the summer.

== Live performances and usage in media ==
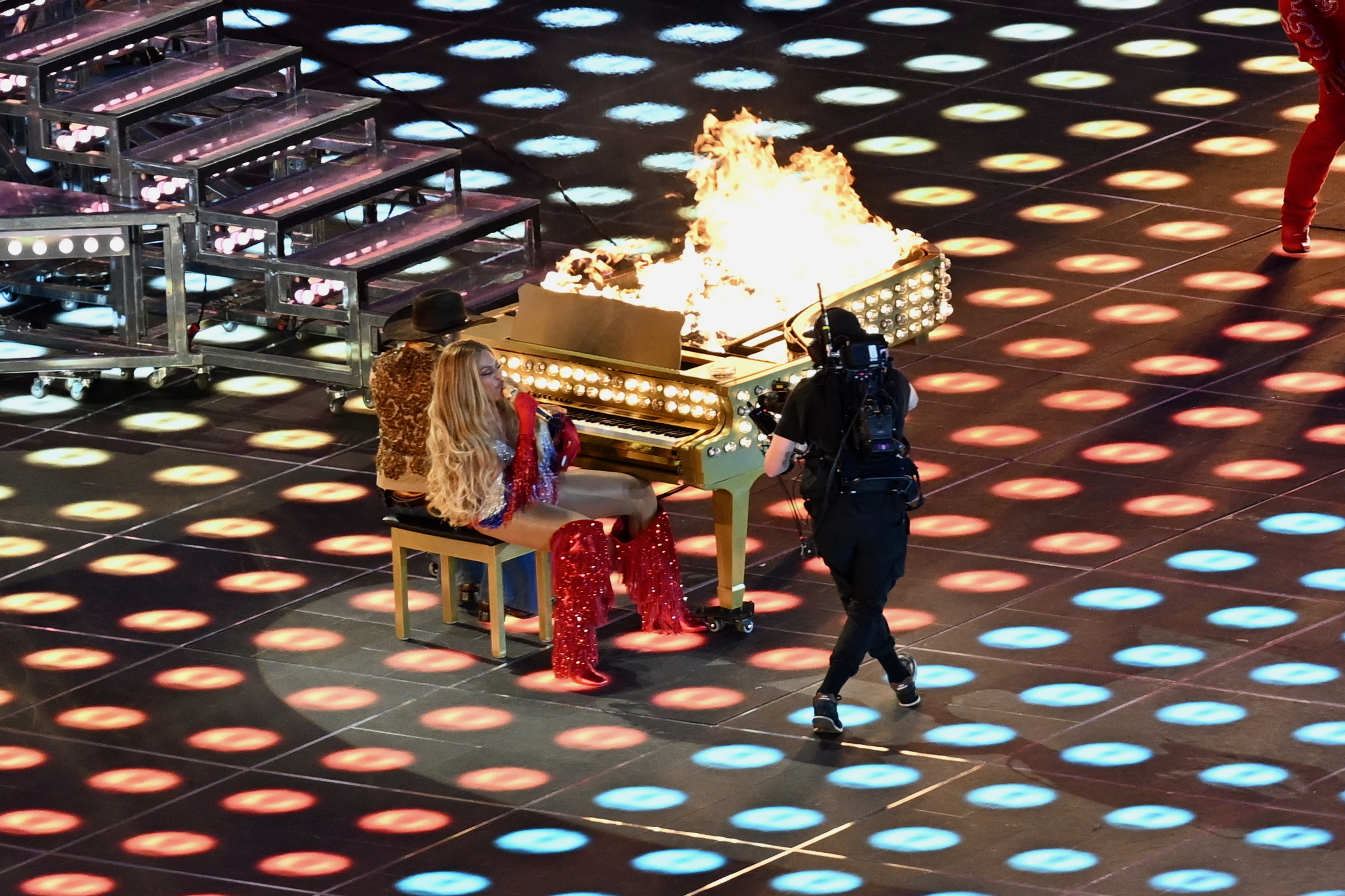
Beyoncé performing "Ya Ya" next to a flaming piano at the Cowboy Carter Tour

On July 27, 2024, NBC released a video in which Beyoncé performs a new version of "Ya Ya" as she introduces Team USA for the 2024 Summer Olympics in Paris. Former First Lady Michelle Obama quoted "Ya Ya" in a social media post encouraging Americans to vote in the 2024 U.S. presidential election.

On December 25, 2024, Beyoncé debuted "Ya Ya" live as part of her 2024 NFL Halftime Show set list. Beyoncé performed a mash-up of "Ya Ya" and "Why Don't You Love Me" as part of the setlist of the 2025 Cowboy Carter Tour.

"Ya Ya" was performed by drag queens Arrietty and Jewels Sparkles in the "lip-sync for your life" segment on the tenth episode of RuPaul's Drag Race's seventeenth season. Jewels Sparkles won the lip-sync and Arrietty was eliminated.

== Charts ==
Chart performance for "Ya Ya"
Chart (2024)	Peak position
Canada Hot 100 (Billboard)	59
Global 200 (Billboard)	43
Portugal (AFP)	90
UK Singles (OCC)	33
US Billboard Hot 100	39

== Certifications ==
Certifications for "Ya Ya"
Region	Certification	Certified units/sales
Brazil (Pro-Música Brasil)	Platinum	40,000^{‡}
^{‡} Sales+streaming figures based on certification alone.
