= Shiona Turini =

Bermudian costume designer and stylist

- Born: Paget Parish, Bermuda
- Education: Hampton University
- Occupations: Stylist, costume designer
- Awards: Primetime Emmy Award for Outstanding Costumes for Variety, Nonfiction or Reality Programming, Costume Designers Guild Award

Shiona Turini is a Bermudian costume designer and stylist. She is known for her styling and for her work with several magazines. She has received an Emmy Award and a Costume Designers Guild Award for her work with her best-known client, Beyoncé.

== Biography ==
She was born and raised in Paget Parish and Devil's Hole, Bermuda. She attended Hampton University in Virginia, where she began to learn about being a stylist and a publicist.

During her time in university, she shadowed the head of PR for Yves Saint Laurent, and received what she believed to be an internship offer. It turned out not to be an offer, but her persistence resulted in a job as an assistant at the fashion company. She worked on selecting hiphop artists to partner with, and partnered with Kanye West, who went on to advertise Yves Saint Laurent glasses in his songs. She stated that this "showed... right away that you have to be above the curve in public relations."

She went on to work as accessories editor at W, as accessories director at Teen Vogue, as head of fashion and beauty for CR Fashion Book, and as fashion market director for Cosmopolitan. She also founded StyleBermuda, the main Bermuda fashion magazine, in 2007.

She subsequently became a consultant, focusing on bringing in a broader audience. She began styling for music with Solange Knowles, though she described her role as a fashion collaborator, before going on to style for Beyoncé. She made her Hollywood debut being costume designer for Queen and Slim, and subsequently emphasized the importance of more Black designers. She became the costume designer for television show Insecure, where she emphasized fashion by Black designers.

In 2020, she styled Barbie dolls in a four-part collection for Black History Month, featuring a diverse range of dolls with four main outfit colors in black, red, brown, and sherbert. She also became an editor for The Cut and a consultant for Amazon. She designed the costumes for Lady in the Lake, and styled Cameron Brink and Usher. She led the styling for the Renaissance World Tour and Cowboy Carter Tour.

In 2019, she was named a top Black fashion force by the Council of Fashion Designers of America. She received the Diamond Influence Award from Diamonds Do Good in 2024, and was named Stylist of the Year by Harlem's Fashion Row that same year. She received the Primetime Emmy Award for Outstanding Costumes for a Variety, Nonfiction, or Reality Programming in 2025 for her work designing the Beyoncé 2024 NFL Halftime Show. She received the Costume Designers Guild Award for Excellence in Short Form Film that same year. She has been nominated for the Black Reel Awards three times. She was named one of the top celebrity stylists of 2025 by The Hollywood Reporter. She sits on the selection committee of the Empowered Vision Awards.

True to her focus on accessories, she wears most of her jewelry at all times, despite at least one of her bracelets being at the bottom of the Atlantic Ocean. She has stated that one of her favorite pieces of attire are crop tops, which she wears during the winter as well as the summer.

She has collaborated with the Bermuda Tourism Authority to promote Bermuda, and currently sits on the board of the Bermuda Tourism Authority.
