= Snoop Dogg 2025 NFL Halftime Show =

2025 show headlined by Snoop Dogg

- Date: December 25, 2025
- Location: Minneapolis, Minnesota, United States
- Venue: U.S. Bank Stadium
- Headliner: Snoop Dogg
- Special guests: Martha Stewart; Ejae; Audrey Nuna; Rei Ami; Lainey Wilson; Andrea Bocelli; Matteo Bocelli; Tonio Armani
- Producer: Jesse Collins Entertainment

The NFL 2025 Christmas Day Halftime Show, also dubbed Snoop's Holiday Halftime Party, was the halftime entertainment for the Detroit Lions vs. Minnesota Vikings game, which took place on December 25, 2025, at the U.S. Bank Stadium in Minneapolis, Minnesota. The show was headlined by rapper Snoop Dogg and marked the second halftime show for an NFL Christmas Day game, after Beyoncé's headline the previous year.

Produced by Jesse Collins Entertainment, the performance featured songs from Snoop Dogg's catalog along with popular Christmas songs, and included Martha Stewart, Ejae, Audrey Nuna, Rei Ami, Lainey Wilson, Andrea Bocelli, Matteo Bocelli and Tonio Armani as guests. Kelly Clarkson opened the broadcast with a pre-recorded performance of "Underneath the Tree", continuing from Mariah Carey's slot the previous year. The game's broadcast broke the record for the most streamed NFL game in U.S. history, with 27.5 million viewers.

== Background ==
In May 2024, Netflix obtained the rights to stream three consecutive years of NFL Christmas Day games, with the first covering both Christmas Day games that year, and at least one game each of the following two years. Beyoncé headlined the 2024 inaugural halftime broadcast between the Baltimore Ravens and Houston Texans. Snoop Dogg was announced as the second-ever Christmas halftime headliner on December 16, 2025, in a promotional trailer narrated by George Clinton.

Snoop Dogg previously co-headlined the Super Bowl LVI halftime show with Kendrick Lamar, Dr. Dre, Mary J. Blige and Eminem, featuring guest appearances from 50 Cent and Anderson .Paak.

== Viewership ==
The Lions v. Vikings broadcast averaged 27.5 million viewers in the United States and peaked at 30 million, breaking the record as the most streamed NFL game in U.S. history. The previous Cowboys v. Commanders game averaged 19.9 million viewers.

== Set list ==
The following songs were performed during the halftime show.

1. "The Next Episode"
2. "My Favorite Things"
3. "Nuthin' but a 'G' Thang"
4. " The Twelve Days of Christmas" (performed by Ejae, Audrey Nuna and Rei Ami as "Huntrix"; contains elements of "Golden")
5. "Drop It Like It's Hot"
6. "Who Am I (What's My Name?)"
7. "Santa Claus Is Comin' to Town" (with Lainey Wilson)
8. "White Christmas" (with Andrea Bocelli and Matteo Bocelli)

== See also ==
- NFL Christmas Gameday
- Super Bowl LVI halftime show
- Beyoncé 2024 NFL Halftime Show
