= Cowboy Carter Tour =

2025 concert tour by Beyoncé

- Tour by Beyoncé
- Promotional poster
- Location: Europe; North America
- Associated album: Cowboy Carter
- Start date: April 28, 2025
- End date: July 26, 2025
- No. of shows: 32
- Producer: Parkwood Entertainment
- Attendance: 1.6 million
- Box office: $407.6 million
- Website: tour.beyonce.com

Beyoncé concert chronology
- Renaissance World Tour (2023); Cowboy Carter Tour (2025); ...

The Cowboy Carter Tour (written in full as Cowboy Carter and the Rodeo Chitlin' Circuit Tour) was the seventh concert tour by the American singer-songwriter Beyoncé, in support of her eighth studio album, Cowboy Carter (2024). It was her fifth all-stadium tour, it comprised thirty-two concerts and commenced on April 28, 2025, in Inglewood, California, and concluded on July 26, in Paradise, Nevada.

Similarly to the Renaissance World Tour, the concerts lasted approximately three hours and were divided into nine acts. The tour's production and staging consisted of a large widescreen with a triangle void in its center that shaped the upper vertice of a five-pointed star formed as the main structure. It also featured levitating platforms, mechanical bulls, pyrotechnics and robotic arms. In line with the promoted album's themes, the artistic direction and production were conceptualized in both American culture and the identity of country music, which are criticized and claimed through songs, symbolism and during narrated passages in video interludes.

The tour received critical acclaim, with various outlets rating it with the highest score in their respective reviews. (Note: Per multiple references:) Critics praised the visuals, the choreography, Beyoncé's performance skills, and many of them singled out the sociopolitical and cultural arguments presented throughout the show. According to Billboard Boxscore, the Cowboy Carter Tour ultimately grossed $407.6 million from 1.6 million tickets sold, breaking over 40 venue records and becoming the highest-grossing country tour in history.

In December 2025, Pollstar named the Cowboy Carter Tour the highest-grossing tour of the year. It achieved the feat both worldwide and in North America. Beyoncé also graced the magazine's cover and talked about the shows on an interview, describing them as "a testament to the power of consistency and dedication" she has poured into her craft over the years.

== Background ==
Beyoncé embarked on the Renaissance World Tour, her ninth concert tour, in 2023, in support of her seventh studio album, Renaissance (2022), breaking the record for the highest-grossing tour by a black artist in history. In 2024, she released her eighth studio album, Cowboy Carter, which led the 67th Annual Grammy Awards with eleven nominations and three winning categories, including Album of the Year and Best Country Album. To further support the album, Beyoncé headlined a Netflix special dubbed as the "Beyoncé Bowl", capturing the halftime performance at the 2024 NFL on Christmas Day game at Houston's NRG Stadium.

A short video clip was added to the end of the broadcasting with a stated date for January 14, 2025, hinting a possible concert tour. The announcement, however, was postponed to an unspecified later date due to the havoc caused by the January 2025 Southern California wildfires. On February 1, 2025, about an hour before midnight eastern time, Netflix tweeted the "Sweet Honey Buckiin'" lyric “Look at that horse” with a link to the “Beyoncé Bowl” performance. Fans quickly noticed that "Cowboy Carter Tour" had been added as a title card at the end of the special, and took to social media.

At around midnight on February 2, 2025, Beyoncé posted promotional videos and updated her various social media accounts and website with the title "Cowboy Carter Tour 2025," along with a promotional poster and 22 dates. The additional Chitlin' Circuit in the tour's name refers to a network of US venues where African-American musicians performed due to segregation enforced by Jim Crow laws. According to American historian Mia Bay, the venues were "one of the more successful segregation-era businesses", being pivotal to the careers of Black entertainers and drawing Black communities. Some cities that were part of the Chiltin' Circuit also serve as stops for the tour.

== Production ==
=== Staging and lighting ===
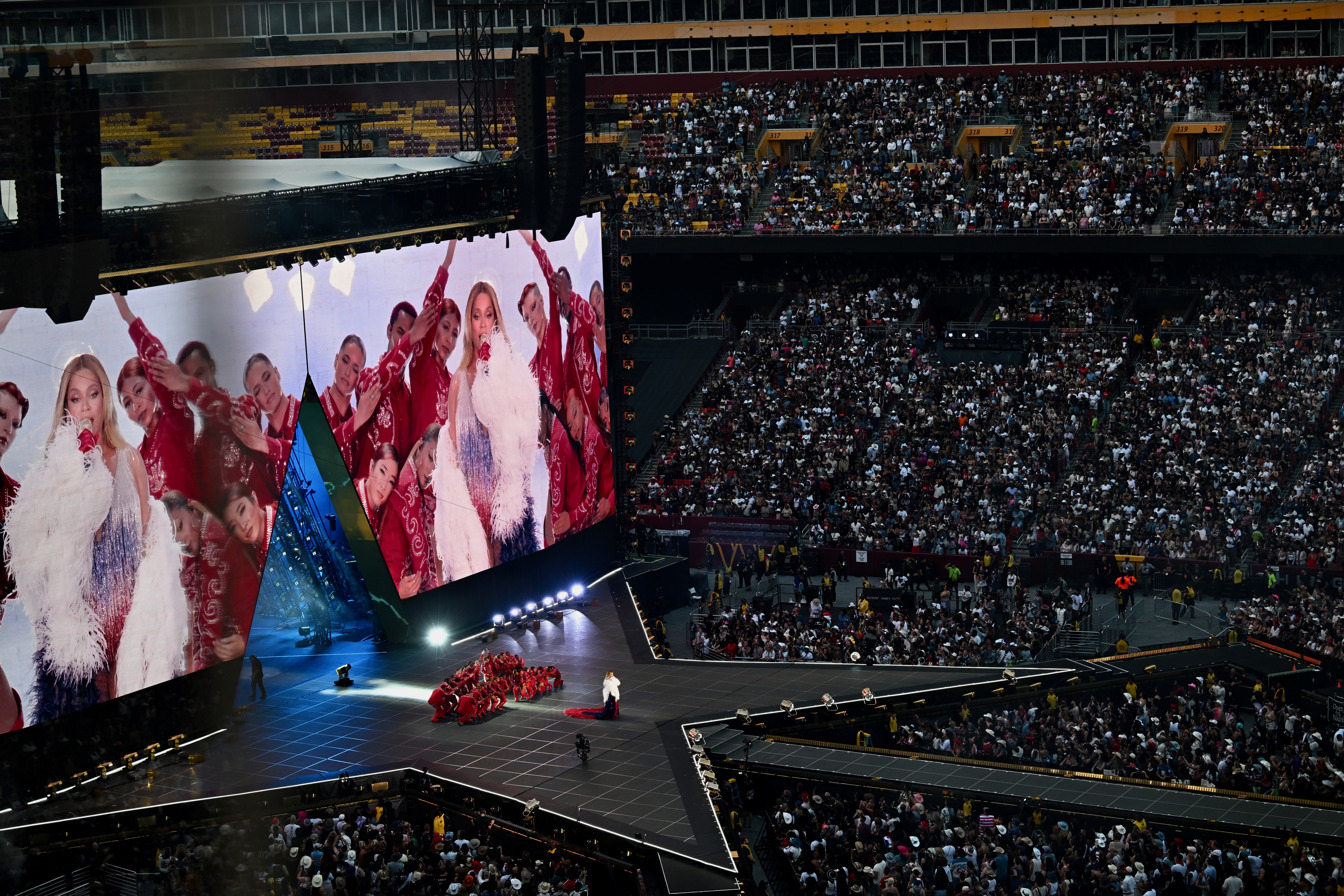
The tour's main stage resembles a five-pointed star.

On April 27, 2025, one day before the opening night of the tour, Beyoncé unveiled a preview of the stage layout via social media following an unauthorised leak. The staging consists of a main stage with a wide structure for both end sides, and a giant, rectangular widescreen featuring a pyramidic void in the middle, which altogether give the optical illusion of a five-pointed star. A triangled platform erected as the secondary stage is connected by three broad ramps: one straight-directed in the middle equipped with LED technology, while the remaining two on a pattern similar to a zigzag line. The robotic arms used during the Renaissance World Tour are once again wielded along with mechanical bulls, pyrotechnics and multiple levitating platforms, including a red Cadillac Eldorado and a horseshoe-shaped swing.

A "B-stage" was also used in the show, placed in the back left of the stadium bowl, with the text "JOLENE'S" on the side. A display was also placed on the back. Beyoncé would fly on the horseshoe from the main stage to perform on the "B-stage". After the first night of the Houston stop when the car got stuck while levitating, the red Cadillac Eldorado was replaced by a golden mechanical horse.

=== Fashion and styling ===
The tour's wardrobe was mostly custom-made by fashion houses such as Dsquared2, Alexander McQueen, Oscar de la Renta and Diesel. Stylized by Shiona Turini, Ty Hunter, and Karen Langley, the costume design followed the flair of country music and Western wear. Beyoncé donned a tailored green checked bodysuit by Burberry, paired with fringed suede leggings with Swarovski crystals and Loch Green boots also embellished with gemstones. A blinged-out denim was designed by Roberto Cavalli, while a white bodysuit, cowboy hat, and chaps that Thierry Mugler's house customized featured over 1740 laser-cut bonded fringes. Moschino fashioned a red and white western shirt-printed catsuit for the show, besides an Anrealage custom LED dress that projected digital images on itself also worn by Beyoncé. Donatella Versace revealed she spent 1,100 hours creating two looks the London concerts; the first was an all-white, Western-inspired chaps look, which was "covered in hand-cut and hand-sewn white fringe and a crystal-covered bodysuit". The second was a "quilted ball gown covered" with Versace's "signature barocco print".

== Concert synopsis ==
The show is structured into eight distinct acts in which Beyoncé performs the track list of Cowboy Carter, interspersed with songs from throughout her catalogue, especially from the first act of the trilogy, Renaissance. Lasting between two and three quarters hours, the screen showcases an American flag test card as the audience enters the stadium.

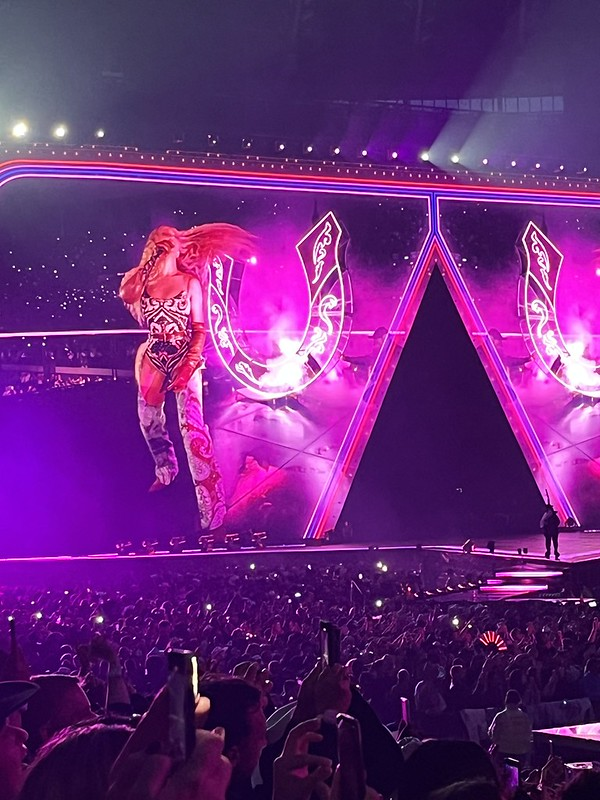
The flying neon horseshoe where Beyoncé performs several songs during the fifth act

As the screen goes dark and horse galloping is heard, the show begins with the first act. Dancers emerge in red and form a triangle formation at the head of the stage for "Ameriican Requiem". The dancers then retreat and Beyoncé emerges solo, singing as the dancers reappear in white and surround her. She then dedicates the "Blackbiird" to black country pioneers that came before her. The screen changes to a visual of Beyoncé draped in white with an American flag behind and glitches out to all red as she sings Jimi Hendrix's rendition of "The Star-Spangled Banner" before going into "Freedom", with the screen displaying “Never ask permission for something that already belongs to you”. The stage opens and the band is rolled out on a platform and "Ya Ya" begins, with choreography similar to her Beyoncé Bowl show. The LED floor changes to flashing dots as she interpolates "Why Don't You Love Me”, then returns to a gold-plated piano on stage that immediately bursts into flames, engaging in a call-and-response with the audience. While retreating as "Oh Louisiana" plays, a robotic arm pours a cup of SirDavis.

The second act begins with an interlude that features Beyoncé flipping through news channels and blurred Fox News commentators disparaging Beyoncé with titles alluding to propaganda and conformity. "America Has a Problem" begins with similar stock market ticker visuals as Renaissance, and Beyoncé emerges behind a transparent podium with microphones with dancers. The screen flashes red with a Spaghetti Western intertitle as she begins "Spaghettii" with a thousand-arm dance routine, continuing into "Formation" with cowboy hats. A giant inflatable red house emerges behind her and the dancers for "My House", which promptly collapses in on itself as the song ends. Beyoncé then dances at the end of the runway for "Diva" with her dancers.

A video interlude featuring an old Western town fleeing from Cowboy Carter opens the third act, with Beyoncé go-go dancing and getting into a bar fight, and as multiple identities at a peep show. She then transforms into a golden statue of an alligator, emerging onstage solo for "Alliigator Tears" and with male dancers for "Just For Fun". Female dancers appear in a triangle formation as she sings "Protector" with appearances by Blue Ivy, and later, Rumi. Following an interlude with home video footage of her children, Beyoncé reappears with riverdancers for "Flamenco". The fourth act starts with a western shootout interlude, and "Desert Eagle". With "Riiverdance", she traverses the stage with her dancers, and "II Hands II Heaven" starts at the end of the runway with the stage being framed by passing clouds. "Sweet Honey Buckiin'" features interpolations of "Pure/Honey" and a dance breakdown alike to her 2024 Christmas Bowl show.

After an interlude featuring neon signage for a bar named Jolene's, the fifth act begins with Beyoncé singing her rendition of "Jolene", where she rides on a flying neon horseshoe above the audience. She leads into "Daddy Lessons" and "Bodyguard", then flying once again on the horseshoe to the B-Stage riser for "Cuff It". Returning to the main stage during the "Wetter Remix", "Tyrant" starts with a golden mechanical bull, going into "Thique", which contains elements of "Bills, Bills, Bills". She is later accompanied by denim-clad male dancers for "Levii's Jeans" and is carried on a red lip-shaped loveseat. A violinist starts off the sixth act and Beyoncé reappears with an LED dress for "Daughter" delivering an opera coda. The visuals change to red curtains and intergalactic travel for a redux of the first act from the Renaissance World Tour, featuring a gold-plated version of the robot dress for "I'm That Girl", golden frames for "Cozy", a golden mattress for "Alien Superstar", and a ballroom dance routine featuring individual dancers with solos on Beyoncé's songs "Countdown", "Top Off" and "Pure/Honey", including Blue Ivy with a "Déjà Vu" dance routine.

The penultimate act interlude shows different versions of Beyoncé as a giant across multiple cities, and leads into "Texas Hold 'Em" then the Homecoming: The Live Album version of "Crazy in Love", followed by "Heated (with elements of "Boots on the Ground") and "Before I Let Go" with all her dancers. A final interlude is a retrospective of Beyoncé’s entire life and career from childhood until present day, and "16 Carriages" starts with Beyoncé in an American flag dress, seated in a car flying above the audience. The levitating car was eventually replaced by a golden mechanical horse after it got stuck in the first night of the Houston stop. The concert ends as dancers appear in American flag-inspired costumes for "Amen" and a bust of the Statue of Liberty's face concealed with a bandana.

== Commercial performance ==
=== Ticket sales ===
Ticket sales for the Cowboy Carter Tour were handled by Ticketmaster, whose website crashed due to "massive demand". For the US dates, it was revealed that there would be three different presale events before the public on-sale, where fans could register for a chance to buy tickets in one of two ways: through the Beyhive presale, which ran from February 11, 2025, until the next day, or through the Artist presale, for access to the presale on February 13. The third option was limited to Citi Card Members and Verizon customers only. Mastercard holders were granted access for a special presale on February 12 for the London and Paris shows.

Ten additional dates were added due to the high demand, including fifth and sixth shows in London, a fifth concert each in Inglewood and East Rutherford, third and fourth shows in Atlanta, a third concert each in Paris and Chicago, and two subsequent shows in Las Vegas. With the added dates, Beyoncé broke the record for the most shows in a single run at MetLife and Mercedes-Benz stadiums in East Rutherford and Atlanta, respectively. In preparation for the general sale, fans booked time off work and crowd-sourced data to track ticket prices. In England, it was estimated that 6.2 million fans would miss out on tickets. According to Billboard, while some fans criticized high ticket prices, the tour saw "impressive" sales, estimating a gross of over $325 million. All three Paris shows at Stade de France sold out within minutes, totalling 240,000 tickets sold. Live Nation reported that sales surpassed the million mark by mid-March 2025, with 94% of tickets being sold.

=== Boxscore ===
On May 12, 2025, Pollstar reported that $55.7 million had been made from the opening five-show run at SoFi Stadium in Inglewood, which had sold over 217,143 tickets. The average attendance was of 43,428 per night, and ticket prices for the concerts ranged from $50 as the cheapest seats to a top price of $801. According to Billboard Boxscore, Beyoncé earned the highest-grossing reported single-venue engagement ever for a female artist, while Cowboy Carter Tour achieved the fifth-highest-grossing tour stop in the publication's history, only behind two legs of U2's Sphere residency (2023–2024), fifteen nights of Harry Styles at Madison Square Garden (2022), and eight shows of Take That at Wembley Stadium (2011). By the end of the tour, it had broken 47 Boxscore records and became the highest-grossing country tour in history.

=== Venue records ===
†	Indicates a former venue record

Venue records
Dates (2025)	Venue	Region	Description	Ref.
April 28 – May 9	SoFi Stadium	United States	Highest gross in history for a female boxscore ($55.7 million) †	
April 28 – May 9	SoFi Stadium	United States	Highest total gross at the venue ($111.4 million)	
April 28 – May 9	SoFi Stadium	United States	Most career performances (8 shows)	
May 15–18	Soldier Field	United States	First Black female act to perform three shows on a single tour	
May 15–18	Soldier Field	United States	Highest gross ($42.5 million)	
May 15–18	Soldier Field	United States	Highest attendance (143,256)	
May 15–18	Soldier Field	United States	Most career performances (10 shows)	
May 22–29	MetLife Stadium	United States	First act to perform five shows on a single tour	
May 22–29	MetLife Stadium	United States	Highest gross in history for a female boxscore ($70.2 million)	
May 22–29	MetLife Stadium	United States	Highest attendance (250,085)	
May 22–29	MetLife Stadium	United States	Highest total gross at the venue ($134.8 million)	
May 22–29	MetLife Stadium	United States	Highest total attendance at the venue (595,762)	
May 22–29	MetLife Stadium	United States	Most career performances (12 shows)	
June 5–16	Tottenham Hotspur Stadium	England	First act to perform six shows on a single tour	
June 5–16	Tottenham Hotspur Stadium	England	Highest gross ($61.5 million)	
June 5–16	Tottenham Hotspur Stadium	England	Highest average gross ($10.2 million)	
June 5–16	Tottenham Hotspur Stadium	England	Highest attendance (275,399)	
June 5–16	Tottenham Hotspur Stadium	England	Highest total gross at the venue ($100.5 million)	
June 5–16	Tottenham Hotspur Stadium	England	Highest total attendance at the venue (515,729)	
June 5–16	Tottenham Hotspur Stadium	England	Most career performances (11 shows)	
June 19–22	Stade de France	France	First international female act to perform three shows on a single tour	
June 19–22	Stade de France	France	Highest gross ($39.7 million)	
June 19–22	Stade de France	France	Highest average gross ($13.2 million)	
June 19–22	Stade de France	France	Highest attendance for a female act (215,025)	
June 19–22	Stade de France	France	Highest total gross at the venue ($79.9 million)	
June 19–22	Stade de France	France	Highest total attendance at the venue for a female act (617,382)	
June 19–22	Stade de France	France	Most career performances for a female act (9 shows)	
June 28–29	NRG Stadium	United States	Highest single-day gross for a female act ($17.7 million)	
June 28–29	NRG Stadium	United States	Highest total gross at the venue ($84.4 million)	
June 28–29	NRG Stadium	United States	Highest total attendance at the venue (471,000)	
June 28–29	NRG Stadium	United States	Most career performances (9 shows)	
July 4–7	Northwest Stadium	United States	Most shows on a single tour (tied with Taylor Swift and Luke Combs) (Note: Beyoncé also tied herself with the On the Run II (2018) and Renaissance (2023) tours.)	
July 4–7	Northwest Stadium	United States	Highest total gross at the venue ($68.2 million)	
July 4–7	Northwest Stadium	United States	Highest total attendance at the venue (273,601)	
July 4–7	Northwest Stadium	United States	Most career performances (6 shows)	
July 10–14	Mercedes-Benz Stadium	United States	First act to perform four shows on a single tour	
July 10–14	Mercedes-Benz Stadium	United States	Highest total attendance at the venue (467,396)	
July 10–14	Mercedes-Benz Stadium	United States	Most career performances (9 shows)	
July 25–26	Allegiant Stadium	United States	Most shows on a single tour for a solo act (tied with Taylor Swift and Morgan Wallen) (Note: Beyoncé also tied herself with the Renaissance World Tour (2023).)	
July 25–26	Allegiant Stadium	United States	Highest total gross at the venue ($45.2 million)	
July 25–26	Allegiant Stadium	United States	Highest total attendance at the venue for a solo act (179,000)	
July 25–26	Allegiant Stadium	United States	Most career performances for a solo act (4 shows)	

== Critical reception ==
The tour received rave reviews from critics, who praised the show's spectacularity and considered it a sequel to the Renaissance World Tour. In a five out of five stars review, Bryan Armen Graham of The Guardian wrote that Beyoncé "brings forth a sweeping, theatrical spectacle that reclaims country music, reframes American identity", stressing that "Beyoncé isn't circling the globe like she did for Renaissance, but her tenth concert tour is a theatrical, tightly executed masterwork". Graham also praised the political images and messages, including the masked Statue of Liberty head with braided hair, finding it "both symbolic and searing". Melissa Ruggeri of USA Today wrote that the tour "amplified the production" and that "her stylistic whiplash is impressive, how she can so seamlessly swap personas". The New York Times named it a 'Critic's Pick', with Jon Caramanica describing it as a show that "turns reclamation, personal and musical, into joyful extravaganza".

Wren Graves of Consequence also praised the tour, writing, "No artist in modern music combines vocal prowess, dance capability, and theatrical vision with such devastating effectiveness." In a feature for GQ, Frazier Tharpe praised Beyoncé's Cowboy Carter Tour for its ambitious, genre-blurring production, calling it “a breathtaking, genre-mashing performance” that “cements her as the most fearless live performer of her generation.” He highlighted the show's expansive scope including over 40 songs spanning country, opera, flamenco, Irish line-dance, cinematic visuals, a golden mechanical bull ride, and set appearances by her daughters Blue Ivy and Rumi as evidence that the tour was “not a departure” from her artistry but a bold evolution of her legacy.

In an essay for Elle, Sylvia Obell provided an in-depth analysis of the tour, describing it as a powerful and unapologetic reclamation of Black artistry and American history. She highlighted the striking visual symbolism throughout the spectacle as a "bold confrontation of the narratives" that have historically marginalized Black contributions to American culture. Obell praised as well the seamless blending of musical genres and theatrical storytelling, noting how the performance reclaims country music's Black roots while simultaneously broadening the narrative of American identity. The essay concluded that Cowboy Carter stands as a landmark artistic statement, reaffirming Beyoncé's role as a "cultural trailblazer unafraid to use her platform for activism and representation".

== Accolades ==
Awards and nominations for the Cowboy Carter World Tour
Year	Ceremony	Category	Result	Ref.
2026	Pollstar Awards	Major Tour of the Year	Nominated	
2026	Pollstar Awards	Country Tour of the Year	Nominated	
2026	Pollstar Awards	Fan Favorite Live Performer of the Year	Nominated	

== Cultural impact ==
The Cowboy Carter Tour shows in England triggered a cowboy fashion craze that set a "new national dress code", according to The Guardian. At PrettyLittleThing, demand for "cowboy jackets" surged by more than 600%, while demand for cowboy hats and boots increased by 85% and 53% respectively. Candace Baldassarre, senior analyst at market research firm Mintel, said that the tour has caused Western aesthetics to experience a revival in fashion. Additionally, the tour triggered a surge in hotel prices in concert locations. Sydney Scott of Essence reported that the Cowboy Carter Tour fueled a wave of entrepreneurship, contributing particularly to a rise in Black women-led businesses that specialize in Western-themed apparel and accessories. Small business owners also launched themed products such as custom Western-style clothing and cowboy accessories that aligned with the tour's fashion, in addition of Black-owned brands seeing a noticeable surge in sales as fans sought out "unique, stylish" items to wear to the shows.

== Philanthropy ==
The announcement of the tour was initially postponed in January 2025 because of wildfires in Southern California, which led to Beyoncé's foundation, BeyGOOD, making a preliminary donation of $2.5 million to the impacted areas of Altadena and Pasadena. By July 2025, BeyGOOD had provided more than $3 million in direct cash aid to those affected by the fires and transitioned into a second phase focused on assisting local rebuilding organizations.

== Set list ==
This set list is from the April 28, 2025, concert in Inglewood.

Act I - Intro

1. "Ameriican Requiem"
2. "Blackbiird"
3. "The Star-Spangled Banner" (contains elements of Jimi Hendrix's arrangement)
4. "Freedom"
5. "Ya Ya" / "Why Don't You Love Me"
6. "Oh Louisiana"

Act II - Propaganda

7. "America Has a Problem"
8. "Spaghettii" (contains elements of "Flawless", "Run the World (Girls)" and "My Power")
9. "Formation"
10. "My House" (contains elements of "Bow Down")
11. "Diva" (contains elements of "Crank That" and "TGIF")

Act III - Trailer

12. "Alliigator Tears"
13. "Just for Fun"
14. "Protector" (with Blue Ivy and Rumi Carter; contains elements of "Dangerously in Love")
15. "Flamenco"

Act IV - Showdown

16. "Desert Eagle"
17. "Riiverdance"
18. "II Hands II Heaven" (contains elements of "Tyrant")
19. "Sweet Honey Buckiin'" / "Pure/Honey" (contains elements of "Summer Renaissance")

Act V - Outlaw

20. "Jolene"
21. "Daddy Lessons"
22. "Bodyguard" (contains elements of "Blow" and "II Most Wanted")
23. "Cuff It" (contains elements of "Wetter" remix, "Dance for You" and "Smoke Hour II")
24. "Tyrant" (contains elements of "Haunted")
25. "Thique" (contains elements of "Say My Name" and "Bills, Bills, Bills")
26. "Levii's Jeans"

Act VI - Holy Daughter

27. "Daughter"

Act VII - Renaissance

28. "I'm That Girl" (contains elements of "Apeshit")
29. "Cozy"
30. "Alien Superstar"

Ballroom battle (contains elements of "Say My Name", "Top Off", "Pure/Honey", "Countdown" and "Déjà Vu")

Act VIII - Outlaw

31. "Texas Hold 'Em" (contains elements of "Pony Up" remix and "Church Girl")
32. "Crazy in Love" (contains elements of "I'm a Hustla" and "Freakum Dress")
33. "Heated" (contains elements of "Boots on the Ground")
34. "Before I Let Go"

Act IX - Legacy

35. "16 Carriages"
36. "Amen" (contains elements of "Ego")

=== Alterations ===
- Starting on May 1, "Tyrant", "Thique", and "Levii's Jeans" were performed during the fourth act; and "Texas Hold 'Em", "Crazy in Love", "Irreplaceable", "If I Were a Boy", "Single Ladies (Put a Ring on It)", and "Love On Top" were performed at the start of the fifth act.
- From June 5 to 12, "Energy" was added to the set list, with the ballroom scene after being shortened.
- "Break My Soul" was performed from June 7 to 12.
- During the first concert in Saint-Denis, "II Most Wanted" was performed with Miley Cyrus.
- During the third concert in Saint-Denis, "Crazy in Love" and "Niggas in Paris" were performed with Jay-Z.
- "Drunk in Love", and "Partition" were performed the third show in Saint-Denis, the third and fourth shows in Atlanta, and the second show in Paradise.
- From June 29 to July 7, "16 Carriages" was not performed.
- During the third and fourth concerts in Atlanta, "Crazy in Love" and "Public Service Announcement" were performed with Jay-Z. Jay-Z also performed "I Just Wanna Love U (Give It 2 Me)" during the fourth concert.
- During the final concert in Paradise, Beyoncé performed "Sweet Honey Buckiin'" and "Pure/Honey" with Shaboozey, "Crazy in Love" and "Niggas in Paris" with Jay-Z, and "Lose My Breath", "Energy", and "Bootylicious" with Kelly Rowland and Michelle Williams.

== Tour dates ==
List of 2025 concerts
Date (2025)	City	Country	Venue	Attendance	Revenue
April 28	Inglewood (Note: Labeled as Los Angeles in promotional material.)	United States	SoFi Stadium	217,143 / 217,143	$55,706,053
May 1	Inglewood	United States	SoFi Stadium	217,143 / 217,143	$55,706,053
May 4	Inglewood	United States	SoFi Stadium	217,143 / 217,143	$55,706,053
May 7	Inglewood	United States	SoFi Stadium	217,143 / 217,143	$55,706,053
May 9	Inglewood	United States	SoFi Stadium	217,143 / 217,143	$55,706,053
May 15	Chicago	United States	Soldier Field	143,256 / 143,256	$42,523,825
May 17	Chicago	United States	Soldier Field	143,256 / 143,256	$42,523,825
May 18	Chicago	United States	Soldier Field	143,256 / 143,256	$42,523,825
May 22	East Rutherford (Note: Labeled as New York City in promotional material.)	United States	MetLife Stadium	250,083 / 250,083	$70,284,615
May 24	East Rutherford	United States	MetLife Stadium	250,083 / 250,083	$70,284,615
May 25	East Rutherford	United States	MetLife Stadium	250,083 / 250,083	$70,284,615
May 28	East Rutherford	United States	MetLife Stadium	250,083 / 250,083	$70,284,615
May 29	East Rutherford	United States	MetLife Stadium	250,083 / 250,083	$70,284,615
June 5	London	England	Tottenham Hotspur Stadium	275,399 / 275,399	$61,580,067
June 7	London	England	Tottenham Hotspur Stadium	275,399 / 275,399	$61,580,067
June 10	London	England	Tottenham Hotspur Stadium	275,399 / 275,399	$61,580,067
June 12	London	England	Tottenham Hotspur Stadium	275,399 / 275,399	$61,580,067
June 14	London	England	Tottenham Hotspur Stadium	275,399 / 275,399	$61,580,067
June 16	London	England	Tottenham Hotspur Stadium	275,399 / 275,399	$61,580,067
June 19	Saint-Denis (Note: Labeled as Paris in promotional material.)	France	Stade de France	215,025 / 215,025	$39,719,132
June 21	Saint-Denis	France	Stade de France	215,025 / 215,025	$39,719,132
June 22	Saint-Denis	France	Stade de France	215,025 / 215,025	$39,719,132
June 28	Houston	United States	NRG Stadium	103,353 / 103,353	$35,492,477
June 29	Houston	United States	NRG Stadium	103,353 / 103,353	$35,492,477
July 4	Landover (Note: Labeled as Washington, D.C. in promotional material.)	United States	Northwest Stadium	93,728 / 93,728	$27,426,395
July 7	Landover	United States	Northwest Stadium	93,728 / 93,728	$27,426,395
July 10	Atlanta	United States	Mercedes-Benz Stadium	205,909 / 205,909	$55,424,228
July 11	Atlanta	United States	Mercedes-Benz Stadium	205,909 / 205,909	$55,424,228
July 13	Atlanta	United States	Mercedes-Benz Stadium	205,909 / 205,909	$55,424,228
July 14	Atlanta	United States	Mercedes-Benz Stadium	205,909 / 205,909	$55,424,228
July 25	Paradise (Note: Labelled as Las Vegas in promotional material.)	United States	Allegiant Stadium	92,269 / 92,269	$19,443,320
July 26	Paradise	United States	Allegiant Stadium	92,269 / 92,269	$19,443,320
Total				1,596,165 / 1,596,165 (100%)	$407,600,112

== See also ==
- List of highest-grossing concert series at a single venue
- List of highest-grossing concert tours by women
- List of Billboard Boxscore number-one concert series of the 2020s

== Notes ==
Cities
