= Ja'Dayia Kursh =

African-American influencer in Western fashion industry

Ja'Dayia Kursh (born 1999) is Arkansas' first Black rodeo queen and an influencer in the Western fashion industry.

== Early life and education ==
Kursh grew up in Fort Smith, Arkansas, born to a 16-year-old mother; her father was in prison when she was 5–13 years old. She first rode a horse at the age of six as part of a therapy recommended by her counselor following a sexual assault. At age 13 she got involved with rodeo, initially riding with a group of all-Black riders called the “Arkansas Seven” but later joining the "Old Fort Days Dandies”, only the second Black female to join the drill team. She also played high school football starting in ninth grade at Fort Smith Northside, the only girl on a team of 110 guys which she says gave her the discipline she needed. She played line backer and defensive end through her junior year. She transferred to Hackett High School for her senior year where she was the only black girl at the school and participated in Future Farmers of America (FFA) and 4-H.

She is a first generation college graduate from Fulbright College at the University of Arkansas earning a B.A. degree in interdisciplinary studies in 2022.

== Rodeo queen and opportunities ==
In 2017, she was crowned Miss Rodeo Coal Hill of Arkansas, becoming the first Black rodeo queen in Arkansas history, shortly after she was stripped of her title, however in 2020 was reinstated. However, this recognition was not publicly noted until Essence Magazine interviewed her in 2019. Since earning her title, she has been a strong advocate for diversity and has mentored a new generation of Black participants in the traditionally slow-to-change rodeo industry. She made a social media comment to Wrangler when they posted support for the black community after the murder of George Floyd, noting that she didn't see anyone on their brand page that looked like her. Representatives then reached out to her along with Boot Barn, Adidas and other brands, thereby launching her career. She has become a Black influencer in the Western fashion industry.

== Advocating diversity and empowering youth and girls ==
While part of the Dandies team, there were people who talked behind her back and posted racist content online. She later noted this experience encouraged her to speak up about diversity and what she would like to see different. She acknowledged that her views make some uncomfortable but believes these are the people who need to hear her message.

Kursh said wished she had seen more minority representation in rodeos when she was younger. Though she now knows about the Bill Pickett Rodeo, which honors Black cowboys like Bill Pickett, she regrets not learning of it sooner. Frustrated with the lack of diversity in traditional rodeo pageants, Kursh launched the Miss Rodeo Fort Smith Pageant, which featured girls from various backgrounds. She secured sponsorships to ensure cost wouldn't prevent participation. Kursh also partnered with brands committed to inclusivity, noting that after raising concerns with Wrangler about the lack of representation, the company took genuine steps toward inclusivity.

Kursh also founded the non-profit Ag For Kids, an organization aimed at teaching children about agriculture, animals and food sources. Her work and story were featured in the “Good Roots” segment on Arkansas PBS, which highlights Arkansas's rural culture and issues like agriculture, health care, and the economy.
