= RM discography =

- RM at W Korea Breast Cancer Campaign, 15 October 2025
- Studio albums: 2
- Singles: 21
- Music videos: 29
- Mixtapes: 2

South Korean rapper RM (formerly Rap Monster) has released two studio albums, two mixtapes, and 21 singles (including 12 as a featured artist). He has recorded with a variety of artists throughout his career including Warren G, MFBTY, Primary, Wale, Fall Out Boy, Tiger JK, Honne, Lil Nas X, Younha, Erykah Badu, Anderson .Paak, Balming Tiger, and Megan Thee Stallion.

RM's career began in 2010 when he signed to Big Hit Entertainment. He spent three years as a trainee at the label, honing his skills as a rapper, musician, and songwriter—he co-wrote songs for 2AM and Glam during that time—frequently sharing songs he made or covered on SoundCloud via the label's official blog. He debuted as a member of BTS, with the stagename Rap Monster, in June 2013. His first solo track for the band was the rap intro from their debut extended play (EP), O!RUL8,2? (2013), released as a video trailer on YouTube in August of that year. He has since authored and performed three more solo songs in the band's repertoire: "Reflection" from Wings (2016), "Trivia: Love" from Love Yourself: Answer (2019), and "Persona" from Map of the Soul: Persona (2019).

Outside of his BTS-related work, the rapper released his first mixtape RM in 2015, under his then-stagename Rap Monster. Three music videos were produced for the tracks "Awakening", "Do You", and "Joke" respectively. The mixtape was never released commercially or made available on streaming platforms. His second mixtape, Mono (2018), was the first full project released under his updated stagename RM, having officially changed it a year prior. Mono's debut at number 26 on the Billboard 200 made him the highest-charting Korean solo artist in the history of the chart at the time, a record he held until 2020 when bandmate Suga's second mixtape D-2 debuted at number 11. Four years later, he released his debut solo album Indigo. The project featured collaborations with Badu, Paak, Tablo of Epik High, and Youjeen of Cherry Filter, who provided vocals on the lead single "Wild Flower", among others. The album peaked at number three on the Billboard 200 and made him the highest-charting Korean solo artist (Note: This record was later surpassed by BTS bandmate Jimin, who peaked at number two with his debut studio album Face in April 2023.) in Billboard chart history once again.

== Studio albums ==
List of studio albums showing select chart positions, sales, and certifications
Title	Album details	Peak chart positions										Sales	Certifications
Title	Album details	KOR	AUS	CAN	JPN Hot	NLD	NZ	SWE	UK	US	US World	Sales	Certifications
Indigo	Released: December 2, 2022; Label: Big Hit Music; Format: CD, digital download, streaming, LP	2	26	19	4	67	12	55	45	3	1	JPN: 33,258; KOR: 879,620; US: 93,500	KMCA: 2× Platinum
Right Place, Wrong Person	Released: May 24, 2024; Label: Big Hit Music; Format: CD, digital download, streaming, LP	2	50	56	2	93	20	—	37	5	—	KOR: 618,168; JPN: 35,285; US: 43,000	KMCA: 2× Platinum

== Mixtapes ==
List of mixtapes, with selected details, chart positions and sales
Title	Album details	Peak chart positions										Sales
Title	Album details	AUS	CAN	IRE	JPN Hot	NLD	NOR	SWE	UK Down.	US	US World	Sales
RM	Released: March 20, 2015; Label: Big Hit Entertainment; Format: Streaming, digital download	—	—	—	—	—	—	—	—	—	12	—N/a
Mono	Released: October 23, 2018; Label: Big Hit; Format: Streaming, digital download	36	22	37	10	29	17	28	2	26	2	JPN: 2,310 (Dig.); US: 16,000
"—" denotes a recording that did not chart or was not released in that territory.

== Singles ==
=== As lead artist ===
List of singles as lead artist, showing year released, selected chart positions, sales, and album name
Title	Year	Peak chart positions									Sales	Album
Title	Year	KOR	CAN	HUN	JPN Dig.	NZ Hot	UK	US	US World	WW	Sales	Album
"Perfect Christmas" (with Jo Kwon, Lim Jeong-hee, Joo Hee, and Jungkook)	2013	45	—	—	—	—	—	—	—	—	KOR: 64,789	Non-album singles
"P.D.D" (with Warren G)	2015	74	—	—	—	—	—	—	9	—	KOR: 16,675	Non-album singles
"Fantastic" (featuring Mandy Ventrice)	2015	—	—	—	—	—	—	—	—	—	KOR: 17,345	Non-album singles
"Change" (with Wale)	2017	—	—	—	—	—	—	—	—	—		Non-album singles
"Forever Rain"	2018	—	—	—	—	—	—	—	6	—		Mono
"Bicycle"	2021	—	—	36	—	—	—	—	3	—		Non-album single
"Wild Flower" (with Youjeen)	2022	49	93	6	—	9	—	83	1	35	US: 29,000	Indigo
"Come Back to Me"	2024	81	—	—	16	11	80	— (Note: "Come Back to Me" did not enter the Billboard Hot 100, but peaked at number three on the Bubbling Under Hot 100.)	—	24	JPN: 2,707	Right Place, Wrong Person
"Lost!"	2024	127	—	—	33	25	93	—	—	68	JPN: 1,715	Right Place, Wrong Person
"Stop the Rain" (with Tablo)	2025	—	—	—	—	—	— (Note: "Stop the Rain" did not enter the UK Singles Chart, but peaked at number 9 on the UK Singles Downloads Chart.)	—	—	178		Non-album single
"—" denotes releases that did not chart or were not released in that region.

=== As featured artist ===
List of singles as featured artist, showing year released, selected chart positions, sales, and album name
Title	Year	Peak chart positions										Sales	Album
Title	Year	KOR Circle	KOR Billb. (Note: includes the now defunct K-pop Hot 100 and subsequent South Korea Songs chart)	HUN	JPN Dig.	NZ Hot	UK Down.	US	US Dig.	US World	WW	Sales	Album
"BuckuBucku" (부끄부끄) MFBTY featuring EE, Rap Monster & Dino-J	2015	—	—	—	—	—	—	—	—	—	—	KOR: 14,686	WondaLand
"U" (Primary featuring Kwon Jin-ah and Rap Monster)	2015	22	—	—	—	—	—	—	—	—	—	KOR: 158,700	2
"Gajah" (코끼리) Gaeko featuring Rap Monster	2017	17	—	—	—	—	—	—	—	—	—	KOR: 120,282	Non-album single
"Champion (Remix)" (Fall Out Boy featuring RM)	2017	— (Note: "Champion (Remix)" did not enter the Gaon Digital Chart, but peaked at number 57 on the International Download Chart.)	—	—	—	—	—	— (Note: "Champion (Remix)" did not enter the Billboard Hot 100, but peaked at number 18 on the Bubbling Under Hot 100 chart.)	23	—	—	US: 18,000; KOR: 5,903	Mania
"Timeless" (Tiger JK featuring RM)	2018	—	—	—	—	—	—	—	—	4	—		Drunken Tiger X: Rebirth of Tiger JK
"Crying Over You" (Honne featuring RM and BEKA)	2019	—	—	—	—	—	—	—	—	—	—		Non-album singles
"Seoul Town Road" (Old Town Road Remix) Lil Nas X featuring RM	2019	—	—	—	—	—	—	—	—	—	—		Non-album singles
"Winter Flower" (Younha featuring RM)	2020	48	33	31	—	—	—	—	30	1	—	US: 5,000	Unstable Mindset
"Don't" (eAeon featuring RM)	2021	—	—	5	—	—	—	—	34	1	—	US: 2,900	Fragile
"Sexy Nukim" (Balming Tiger featuring RM)	2022	— (Note: "Sexy Nukim" did not enter the Circle Digital Chart, but peaked at number 23 on the component Download Chart.)	—	—	—	33	60	—	30	1	—		Non-album single
"Smoke Sprite" (So-yoon featuring RM)	2023	— (Note: "Smoke Sprite" did not enter the Circle Digital Chart, but peaked at number 22 on the component Download Chart.)	—	39	36	—	15	—	9	—	—	JPN: 1,203 (Dig.)	Episode 1: Love
"Don't Ever Say Love Me" (다시는 사랑한다 말하지 마) (Colde featuring RM)	2023	— (Note: "Don't Ever Say Love Me" did not enter the Circle Digital Chart, but peaked at number 31 on the component Download Chart.)	—	29	33	—	—	—	43	4	—	JPN: 1,837 (Dig.); US: 2,000	Love Part 2
"Neva Play" (Megan Thee Stallion featuring RM)	2024	— (Note: "Neva Play" did not enter the Circle Digital Chart, but peaked at number 19 on the component Download Chart.)	—	—	27	2	—	36	—	—	17	JPN: 1,385 (Dig.)	Megan: Act II
"—" denotes releases that did not chart or were not released in that region.

== Other charted songs ==
List of other charted songs, showing year released, selected chart positions, sales, and album name
Title	Year	Peak chart positions								Sales	Album
Title	Year	KOR Circle	KOR Billb. (Note: Includes the now defunct K-pop Hot 100 and the subsequent South Korea Songs chart.)	HUN	NZ Hot	UK Down.	US Dig.	US World	WW	Sales	Album
"Reflection" (Note: credited to BTS, but the track is a solo by RM)	2016	38	—	—	—	—	—	—	—	KOR: 82,068	Wings
"Trivia 承: Love"	2018	56	8	20	—	66	31	9	—	US: 10,000	Love Yourself: Answer
"Seoul"	2018	—	—	—	—	—	—	5	—		Mono
"Moonchild"	2018	—	—	—	—	—	—	8	—		Mono
"Badbye" (featuring eAeon)	2018	—	—	—	—	—	—	14	—		Mono
"Uhgood"	2018	—	—	—	—	—	—	13	—		Mono
"Everythingoes" (featuring Nell)	2018	—	—	—	—	—	—	12	—		Mono
"Persona"	2019	34	7	22	—	—	—	7	—	US: 6,800	Map of the Soul: Persona
"Strange" (Agust D featuring RM)	2020	—	—	26	—	—	10	2	—		D-2
"Yun" (with Erykah Badu)	2022	173	—	—	33	—	14	3	—		Indigo
"Still Life" (with Anderson .Paak)	2022	157	—	—	29	—	10	2	187		Indigo
"All Day" (with Tablo)	2022	159	—	—	—	—	18	5	—		Indigo
"Forg_tful" (with Kim Sa-wol)	2022	191	—	—	—	—	22	8	—		Indigo
"Closer" (with Paul Blanco and Mahalia)	2022	195	—	—	34	—	15	—	—		Indigo
"Lonely"	2022	—	—	—	—	—	16	4	—		Indigo
"Hectic" (with Colde)	2022	—	—	—	—	—	19	6	—		Indigo
"No.2" (with Park Ji-yoon)	2022	181	—	—	—	—	20	7	—		Indigo
"Right People, Wrong Place"	2024	—	—	—	—	—	15	—	—		Right Place, Wrong Person
"Nuts"	2024	—	—	—	—	—	14	1	—		Right Place, Wrong Person
"Out of Love"	2024	—	—	—	—	—	22	—	—		Right Place, Wrong Person
"Domodachi" (featuring Little Simz)	2024	—	—	—	—	—	19	3	—		Right Place, Wrong Person
"? (Interlude)" (with Domi and JD Beck)	2024	—	—	—	—	—	24	—	—		Right Place, Wrong Person
"Groin"	2024	—	—	—	—	—	18	2	—		Right Place, Wrong Person
"Heaven"	2024	—	—	—	—	—	20	—	—		Right Place, Wrong Person
"Around the World in a Day" (featuring Moses Sumney)	2024	—	—	—	—	—	21	—	—		Right Place, Wrong Person
"ㅠㅠ (Credit Roll)"	2024	—	—	—	—	—	25	—	—		Right Place, Wrong Person
"—" denotes releases that did not chart or were not released in that region

== Other songs ==
List of non-single songs, showing year released and other performing artists
Title	Year	Other artist(s)	Album	Ref.
"Rap Monster"	2012	None	Non-album release	
"Where U At"	2013	None	Non-album release	
"Favorite Girl"	2013	None	Non-album release	
"Like a Star"	2013	Jungkook	Non-album release	
"Adult Child"	2013	Suga, Jin	Non-album release	
"Something"	2013	None	Non-album release	
"Too Much"	2014	None	Non-album release	
"Monterlude"	2014	None	Non-album release	
"RM Cyper Ruff"	2014	None	Non-album release	
"Unpack Your Bags"	2015	DJ Soulscape	Non-album release	
"I Know"	2016	Jungkook	Non-album release	
"Always"	2017	None	Non-album release	
"4 O'clock"	2017	V	Non-album release	
"땡 (Ddaeng)"	2018	Suga, J-Hope	Non-album release	

== Other appearances ==
List of other appearances, showing year released, other performing artists, and album name
Title	Year	Other artist(s)	Album	Ref.
"ProMeTheUs" (튀겨)	2015	Yankie (featuring Dok2, Juvie Train, Double K, Topbob, Don Mills)	Andre	
"Crying Over You" (Note: China exclusive digital single)	2019	Honne (featuring Bibi Zhou)	Non-album single	

Notes

- RM provided backing vocals for the 2020 single "Hope" by South Korean singer-songwriter John Eun.

== Music videos ==
Name of music video, year released, other credited artist(s), director, and additional notes
Title	Year	Other performer(s) credited	Director(s)	Description	Ref.
"Intro: O!RUL8,2"	2013	None	Unknown	Animation	
"Perfect Christmas"	2013	Jungkook, Jo Kwon, Lim Jeong-hee, and Joo Hee (8eight)	Unknown		
"What Am I to You"	2014	None	Unknown	Comeback trailer for BTS' first studio album Dark & Wild (2014). RM does not appear in the video, but is heard rapping in its audio.	
"P.D.D"	2015	Warren G	Unknown		
"Awakening"	2015	None	Unknown		
"BuckuBucku"	2015	MFBTY, EE, Dino J	YongSeok Choi (Lumpens)		
"Do You"	2015	None	Woogie Kim (GDW)		
"Joke"	2015	None	Unknown		
"ProMeTheUs (튀겨)"	2015	Yankie, Dok2, Juvie Train, Double K, Top Bob, Don Mills	Unknown		
"Fantastic"	2015	Mandy Ventrice	Unknown	RM is shown performing the song interspersed with clips from the Fantastic 4 film. Ventrice does not appear in the video, but is heard singing in its audio.	
"Change"	2017	Wale	Beomjin (VM Project Architecture)		
"Gajah (코끼리)"	2017	Gaeko	Unknown	3D animated video	
"Forever Rain"	2018	None	Choi Jaehoon	Black and white animated video	
"Seoul"	2018	None	YongSeok Choi (Lumpens)	Lyric video	
"Moonchild"	2018	None	YongSeok Choi (Lumpens)	Lyric video	
"Timeless"	2018	Drunken Tiger	Unknown	Lyric video. Neither artist appear in the video, but both are heard rapping in its audio.	
"Persona"	2019	None	YongSeok Choi (Lumpens)	comeback trailer for BTS' sixth extended play Map of the Soul: Persona (2019)	
"Sexy Nukim"	2022	Balming Tiger	Pennacky		
"Wild Flower"	2022	Youjeen	Woogie Kim		
"Still Life"	2022	Anderson .Paak	Jaeyeob Bang (BangJaeyeonFilm)		
"Closer"	2023	Mahalia and Paul Blanco	—N/a (Note: edited by Lee Changhoon)	Comprises various scenes from the film Decision to Leave (2022), featuring Tang Wei and Park Hae-il. None of the artists appear in the video, but are heard rapping and singing in its audio, which features a new lo-fi arrangement.	
"Smoke Sprite"	2023	So-yoon	Lee Suho	RM appears in the latter half of the video, dressed in all black, rapping on the ground next to an overturned car in a junkyard, then singing the song back-to-back with So-yoon.	
"Don't Ever Say Love Me"	2023	Colde	Unknown	A performance video, Colde and RM sing the song together in a large, empty white room with a swirling pool of water in the center of the floor. As the song progresses, the room flashes between darkness and light and white sheets of paper begin swirling in the air around and above them.	
"Come Back to Me"	2024	None	Lee Sung Jin	Filmed in Paju. Featured cast includes Kim Min-ha, Joseph Lee, and Kang Gil-woo. Reminiscent of a short film, the music video portrays the "strange story" of a man (RM) "trapped in the past, present and future" who seems "[un]able to leave his own home."	
"Lost!"	2024	None	Aube Perrie	RM finds himself trapped in a maze-like building with numerous floors, hallways, and rooms. He is seen stuck in an elevator and an office with other office workers. With their help, he attempts to navigate his way out. They locate an airduct that leads him to the set of the Lost! Show, a bizarre fictional talk show, where he is announced by its presenters as the musical guest.	
"Groin"	2024	None	Pennacky	Filmed in London, RM walks through the streets of the city on a cloudy day, dressed in a navy tracksuit, while rapping the song.	
"Nuts"	2024	None	Pennacky	A live video of RM performing the song in the music studio in London where his second studio album Right Place, Wrong Person (2024) was mixed. Photos taken of him during the album's recording process are interspersed throughout the clip.	
"Domodachi"	2024	Little Simz	Pennacky	Neither artist appear in the video, which follows a teenage protagonist out biking with a friend one evening. He "embarks on a feverish journey through underground tunnels in a dark cityscape", encountering a violent riot and a subway "full of depressed-looking commuters". With the help of another friend, he eventually escapes by climbing over a fence and returns to his first friend. They walk home together at sunrise.	
"ㅠㅠ (Credit Roll)"	2024	None	Pennacky	RM performs the song while a lone camera records him as busy staff members work around him. Elsewhere in the same room, a group of people sit at a table eating and engrossed in conversation. They barely notice RM and pay no attention to his performance being shown on a television next to their table.	

Notes

- RM made an uncredited cameo in MFBTY's "Bang Diggy Bang Bang" music video—released March 8, 2015—in a toilet scene referencing his verse from the "BuckuBucku" music video.
- RM appeared in the short film Reflection released in September 2016 in promotion of BTS' fourth studio album Wings (2016).
