= D-Day Tour =

2023 concert tour by Suga

Suga Agust D Tour 'D-Day'
- Tour by Suga
- Promotional poster for the tour
- Location: North America; Asia
- Associated album: D-Day
- Start date: April 26, 2023
- End date: August 6, 2023
- No. of shows: 28
- Attendance: 320,233
- Box office: $57.2 million

Suga | Agust D Tour 'D-Day' (known as Suga | Agust D Tour prior to the album release) was the first worldwide concert tour by South Korean rapper Suga, also known as Agust D, in support of his debut studio album, D-Day. The tour began on April 26, 2023, in New York City, and ended on August 6, 2023, in Seoul, South Korea.

== Background and development ==
On February 14, 2023, Big Hit Music announced that Suga would be embarking on a world tour with a poster listing dates for 20 shows in the United States, Indonesia, Thailand, Singapore, and South Korea. On March 10, 2023, new shows were announced for June 2–4 at the Pia Arena MM in Kanagawa, Japan. Additional shows in Singapore and Bangkok, Thailand were announced on April 5, 2023. On June 25, 2023, during the artist's then-last worldwide concert tour date in Seoul, 3 additional encore shows at KSPO Dome in Seoul, South Korea were announced, bringing the total number of shows to 28.

== Ticketing ==
Tickets for the US leg of the tour were made available for pre-sale to BTS' global fan club members on March 1 via Ticketmaster, with a general public on-sale scheduled for March 3. On March 1, Ticketmaster reported that all tickets would be released during the first pre-sale because "the demand exceeded the number of available tickets"; the general verified fan pre-sale and public on-sale were subsequently cancelled due to continued high demand. Media outlets noted the fan criticism that Ticketmaster faced for their handling of the sales, particularly in light of the 2022 controversy.

== Critical reception ==
Critics appreciated the tour's production value and artistic direction. Tamar Herman of the Variety thought that "the concert unveils itself like a noir musical with a storm of thunder and lightning amid a purple haze". Likewise, Jae-ha Kim of Teen Vogue, compared it to a rock opera and theater, because of the "pyrotechnics, a backup band and a nine-panels stage that will eventually disappear". Giving it a five star rating, Rhian Daly from NME wrote that Suga's "underrated vocal skills and rap bar-spitting abilities are second to none". Naming the tour as one the best concerts of 2023, Freya Rinaldi of Atwood Magazine praised the uniqueness of Suga's "performance and his breathtaking stage presence" and the lights and stage production of the show as "incomparable to any other current running tour", deeming it as "one of the best tours to hit the United States in 2023". Kayti Burt of Paste dubbed Suga's performance of Snooze during the final concert as "one of the year's most powerful moments in pop music—the culmination of an arduous journey of self-knowledge and healing, and a testament to one musician's deep connection to his art." Based on tour data provided to Pollstar, the tour is 9th on the 2023 Top 20 Global Concert Tours list, which ranks artists by average box office gross per number of cities.

== Set list ==
1. "Haegeum"
2. "Daechwita"
3. "Agust D"
4. "Give It to Me"
5. "Trivia: Seesaw" (acoustic)
6. "SDL"
7. "People"
8. "People Pt. 2"
9. "Moonlight"
10. "Burn It"
11. "Interlude: Shadow"
12. "BTS Cypher Pt. 3: Killer" / "BTS Cypher 4" / "UGH!" / "Ddaeng" / "HUH?"
13. "Life Goes On" (piano)
14. "Snooze"
15. "Polar Night"
16. "Amygdala"

Encore

17. "D-Day"
18. "Intro: Never Mind"
19. "The Last"

=== Notes ===
- May 11: Max joined Suga on stage performing their song "Burn It" together.
- May 14: Halsey joined Suga on stage performing their song "Suga's Interlude" together.
- June 24: Psy joined Suga on stage performing their song "That That" together.
- August 4: Jungkook joined Suga on stage performing the song "Burn It" together, Jungkook also performed "Seven" solo after that.
- August 5: Jimin joined Suga on stage performing the song "Tony Montana" together, Jimin also performed "Like Crazy" solo after that.
- August 6: RM joined Suga on stage performing the song "Strange" together, RM also performed his then-unreleased song "Come Back to Me" after that.
- August 4, 5, 6: Suga performed "Dear My Friend" instead of "Polar Night".

== Shows ==
Date	City	Country	Venue	Attendance	Revenue
Leg 1 – North America
April 26, 2023	Elmont (Note: Promoted as Belmont Park.)	United States	UBS Arena	151,195	$6,074,711
April 27, 2023	Elmont	United States	UBS Arena	151,195	$6,074,711
April 29, 2023	Newark	United States	Prudential Center	151,195	$2,923,465
May 3, 2023	Rosemont	United States	Allstate Arena	151,195	$8,082,446
May 5, 2023	Rosemont	United States	Allstate Arena	151,195	$8,082,446
May 6, 2023	Rosemont	United States	Allstate Arena	151,195	$8,082,446
May 10, 2023	Inglewood (Note: Promoted as Los Angeles.)	United States	Kia Forum	151,195	$9,492,531
May 11, 2023	Inglewood	United States	Kia Forum	151,195	$9,492,531
May 14, 2023	Inglewood	United States	Kia Forum	151,195	$9,492,531
May 16, 2023	Oakland	United States	Oakland Arena	151,195	$5,953,317
May 17, 2023	Oakland	United States	Oakland Arena	151,195	$5,953,317
Leg 2 – Asia
May 26, 2023	Banten (Note: Promoted as Jakarta.)	Indonesia	Indonesia Convention Exhibition	27,746	$4,352,121
May 27, 2023	Banten	Indonesia	Indonesia Convention Exhibition	27,746	$4,352,121
May 28, 2023	Banten	Indonesia	Indonesia Convention Exhibition	27,746	$4,352,121
June 2, 2023	Yokohama	Japan	Pia Arena MM	26,809	$3,141,211
June 3, 2023	Yokohama	Japan	Pia Arena MM	26,809	$3,141,211
June 4, 2023	Yokohama	Japan	Pia Arena MM	26,809	$3,141,211
June 9, 2023	Pak Kret (Note: Promoted as Bangkok.)	Thailand	Impact Arena	36,107	$4,439,420
June 10, 2023	Pak Kret	Thailand	Impact Arena	36,107	$4,439,420
June 11, 2023	Pak Kret	Thailand	Impact Arena	36,107	$4,439,420
June 16, 2023	Singapore		Singapore Indoor Stadium	27,340	$5,427,671
June 17, 2023	Singapore		Singapore Indoor Stadium	27,340	$5,427,671
June 18, 2023	Singapore		Singapore Indoor Stadium	27,340	$5,427,671
June 24, 2023	Seoul	South Korea	Jamsil Indoor Stadium	14,715	$1,909,665
June 25, 2023	Seoul	South Korea	Jamsil Indoor Stadium	14,715	$1,909,665
August 4, 2023	Seoul	South Korea	KSPO Dome	38,523	$5,427,561
August 5, 2023	Seoul	South Korea	KSPO Dome	38,523	$5,427,561
August 6, 2023	Seoul	South Korea	KSPO Dome	38,523	$5,427,561
Total				320,233	$57,224,119
