= RM (musician) =

South Korean rapper (born 1994)

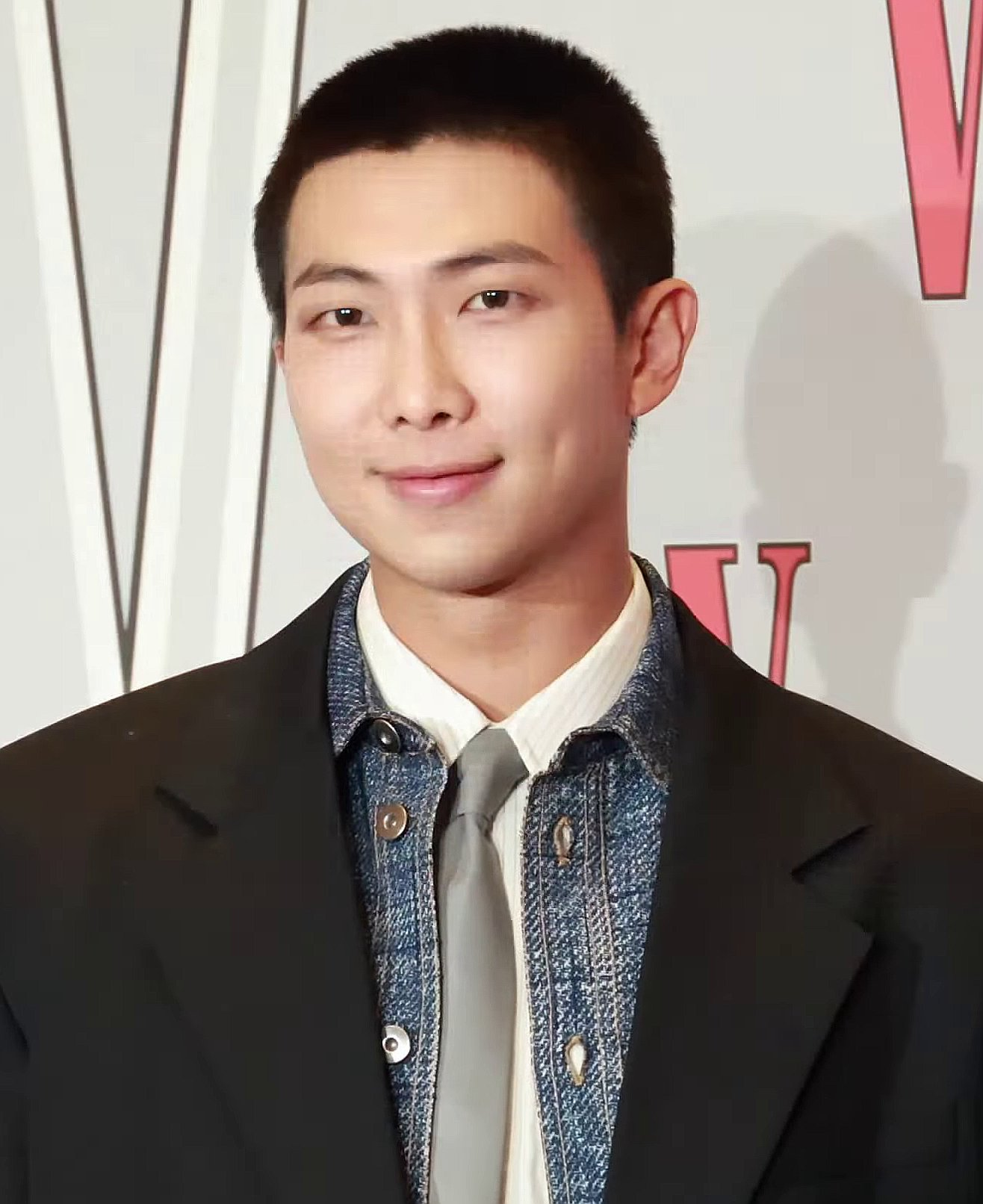
- RM in November 2023
- Born: Kim Nam-joon; September 12, 1994 (age 32); Seoul, South Korea
- Education: Global Cyber University
- Occupations: Rapper; songwriter; record producer
- Years active: 2010–present
- Works: Discography; Songs written
- Honors: Hwagwan Order of Cultural Merit (2018)
- Musical career
- Genres: K-pop; hip hop; R&B; Alt-pop (Note: RM released his 11 track sophomore album Right Place, Wrong Person in Alt-pop genre.)
- Instrument: Vocals
- Label: Big Hit
- Member of: BTS

Korean name
- Hangul: 김남준
- Hanja: 金南俊
- RR: Gim Namjun
- MR: Kim Namjun

Kim Nam-joon (Korean: 김남준; born September 12, 1994), known professionally as RM (formerly Rap Monster), is a South Korean rapper, songwriter, and record producer. He is the leader of South Korean boy band BTS, under Big Hit Music. Born in Seoul and raised in Ilsan, RM began his music career in the underground Korean hip-hop scene as a teenager, going by the name Runch Randa. He joined Big Hit in 2010, and debuted as part of BTS in June 2013.

RM released his first solo mixtape, RM, in 2015, followed by his second mixtape, Mono, in 2018. The latter became the highest-charting album by a Korean solo artist in the United States in history when it peaked at number 26 on the Billboard 200. He made his official solo debut in 2022, with the release of his studio album Indigo. The project featured contributions from various artists including Erykah Badu and Anderson .Paak. It peaked at number three on the Billboard 200, becoming the highest-charting album by a Korean solo artist of all-time. (Note: The record was later surpassed by his BTS bandmates Jimin and Suga, who both peaked at number two on the Billboard 200 with their debut solo albums, Face (2023) and D-Day (2023) respectively.) In 2024, he experimented with alternative music on his sophomore album Right Place, Wrong Person, which peaked at number five on the Billboard 200 and garnered critical acclaim. RM has also collaborated with artists such as Warren G, Krizz Kaliko, MFBTY, Primary, Gaeko, Wale, Fall Out Boy, Younha, Megan Thee Stallion, Tablo, and Lil Nas X.

== Early life and education ==
Kim Nam-joon was born on September 12, 1994, in Sangdo-dong, Dongjak District, Seoul, South Korea, and grew up in Ilsan District, Goyang, where his family moved when he was aged four or five. He has a younger sister and is part of the Gangneung Kim clan. As a child, RM largely learned English by watching the American sitcom Friends with his mother. As a student, he actively wrote poetry and often received awards for his writing. He posted his work to an online poetry website for roughly one year, where he received moderate attention. As a result, RM expressed interest in pursuing a literary career but later decided against it. When he was twelve years old, he studied in New Zealand for four months.

At age 11, in fifth grade, RM became interested in hip-hop music after hearing Epik High's "Fly". Finding that the song had provided him comfort, he decided to look further into the genre. He was introduced to the music of American rapper Eminem by his school teacher, which first sparked RM's interest in lyricism. He would print out lyrics that he felt were "cool" and shared them with friends. RM began songwriting at that time, stating that his poetry became lyrics when combined with music. In 2007, as a first-year middle school student, he began rapping in local amateur hip-hop circles, creating his first self-composed recording with the program Adobe Audition (then called Cool Edit) and later participating in his first concert in 2008. RM became more active in the underground Korean hip-hop scene under the moniker Runch Randa, releasing several tracks and collaborations with other underground rappers such as Zico.

As a student, RM had an IQ of 148 and scored in the top 1% of the nation in the university entrance examinations for language, math, foreign language and social studies. Because his parents had been strongly opposed to his interest in a musical career due to his academic achievements, RM initially decided to set music aside to focus on his studies. He eventually convinced his mother to allow him to be a rapper, asking her if "she wanted to have a son who was a first-place rapper, or a 5,000th-place student".

In March 2019, after graduating from Global Cyber University with a degree in Broadcasting and Entertainment, RM enrolled at Hanyang Cyber University's Master of Business Administration program in Advertising and Media.

== Name ==
RM selected the name "Rap Monster" during his time as an idol trainee. The name derives from the lyrics of a song he wrote, inspired by San E's "Rap Genius". The lyrics contained a segment where San E declares he should be called a "rap monster" as he "raps non-stop". He adopted the stage name because he felt it was "cool". RM has described himself as having a love–hate relationship with the name, feeling that it was not selected for being of "incredible value" to him.

He formally changed his stage name to "RM" in November 2017, as he determined that "Rap Monster" was no longer representative of who he was or the music that he creates. In an interview with Entertainment Tonight in 2019, RM stated that the name "could symbolize many things" and "could have more spectrums to it", such as "Real Me".

== Career ==
=== 2010–2013: Joining Big Hit Entertainment and debut with BTS ===
In 2009, RM auditioned for Big Deal Records, passing the first round along with Samuel Seo but failing the second round after forgetting lyrics. However, following the audition, rapper Sleepy exchanged contact information with RM, whom he later mentioned to Big Hit Entertainment producer Pdogg. In 2010, Sleepy contacted RM, encouraging him to audition for Big Hit Entertainment CEO Bang Si-hyuk. Bang offered RM, then aged 16, a spot at the record label, which he accepted immediately and without his parents' knowledge. Bang and Pdogg soon began forming a hip hop group that would eventually become the idol group BTS.

RM trained for three years with fellow rapper Min Yoon-gi and dancer Jung Ho-seok, later known as Suga and J-Hope, respectively. During this three-year trainee period, RM performed on five pre-debut tracks credited to BTS in 2010 and 2011. He also worked as a songwriter for girl group Glam and helped pen their debut single "Party (XXO)", a pro-LGBTQ song that was praised by Billboard as "one of the most forward-thinking songs out of a K-pop girl group in the past decade." On June 13, 2013, RM made his debut with BTS and has since produced and written lyrics for many tracks on their albums. On August 29, 2013, RM performed the intro track to BTS' first extended play (EP) O!RUL8,2?, which was released as a trailer ahead of the EP's September 11 release, marking his first solo after debuting.

=== 2014–2016: First solo collaborations, RM and Problematic Men ===
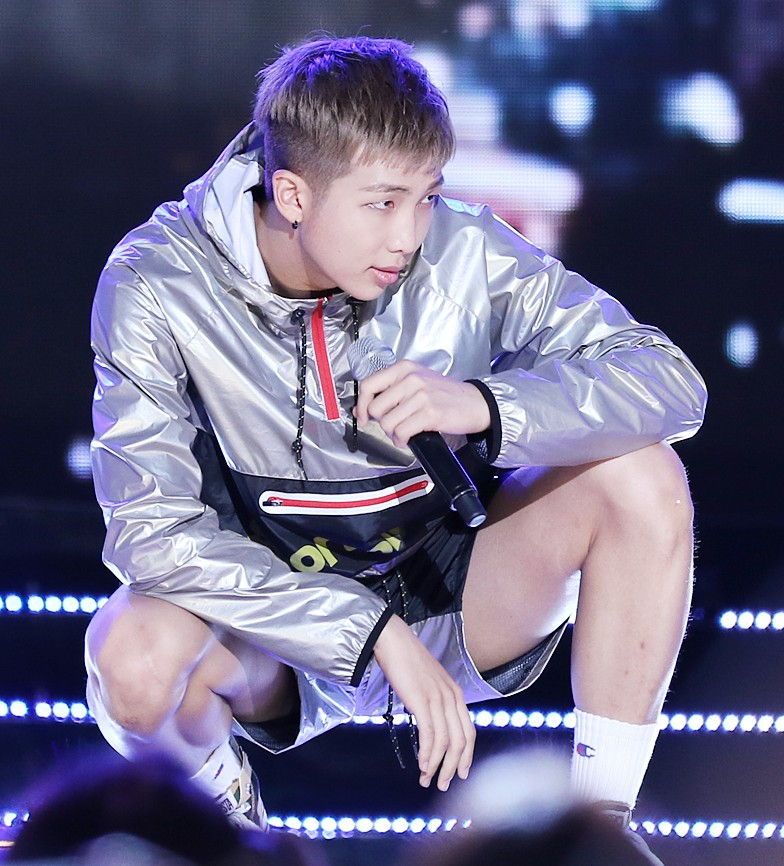
RM performing in July 2015

On August 5, 2014, Big Hit Entertainment released a trailer for BTS' first studio album Dark & Wild, which was set to be released on August 20. The rap track, officially credited to BTS as "Intro: What Am I to You?", was a solo performed by RM. Through reality television show American Hustle Life, which was used to produce Dark & Wild, RM formed a working relationship with Warren G, who offered to write BTS a beat. In an interview with Korean magazine Hip Hop Playa, Warren G stated that he had befriended BTS through the program and had kept in touch with the band after they returned to South Korea. On March 4, 2015, RM released a single with Warren G entitled, "P.D.D (Please Don't Die)" ahead of his first solo mixtape RM following an offer by Warren G to collaborate. The track reflected how RM felt towards those who hated and criticized him at the time, which he used to find very upsetting. That same March, RM collaborated with hip hop project group MFBTY, EE and Dino J on the song "Bucku Bucku". He featured in the song's music video and also had a cameo appearance in a music video for another song by MFBTY, "Bang Diggy Bang Bang". RM had first formed a lasting working relationship with MFBTY member Tiger JK after meeting and expressing admiration for him on a TV show in 2013, when Tiger JK was promoting his song "The Cure".

RM was cast as a regular on the Korean variety program Problematic Men, where cast members were given a variety of puzzles and problems to solve and work through by discussing their own thoughts and experiences. The program began airing on February 26, 2015; however, RM left the show after 22 episodes due to BTS' 2015 Red Bullet world tour.

On March 17, 2015, RM released his first solo mixtape, RM, which ranked 48th on Spin's "50 Best Hip Hop Albums of 2015". The mixtape addressed a variety of topics, such as RM's past on the track "Voice" and the idea that "you're you and I'm me" in the track "Do You". When discussing the track "God Rap", RM described himself as an atheist, believing that only he could determine his fate. The production process for the mixtape lasted around four or five months, with RM working on it in between BTS' activities. The following year, RM recalled that he had largely written about the negative emotions he had been carrying, such as anger and rage, but stated that the songs are not "100% under [his] sovereignty" and that he felt many parts of the mixtape were "immature". He also added that he hoped his next mixtape to be something he worked on by himself. Following RM's release, he featured along with Kwon Jin-ah on Primary's "U" that April. In May, he collaborated on Yankie's ProMeTheUs alongside Dok2, Juvie Train, Illson, Topbob and Don Mills. In August, RM collaborated with Marvel for Fantastic Four's soundtrack in Korea, releasing the digital single, "Fantastic" featuring Mandy Ventrice through Melon, Genie, Naver Music and other music platforms. In September, he headlined hip-hop concert All Force One 2015 - Hot & Cool alongside Korean veteran rappers Paloalto and Verbal Jint. In August 2016, vocal duo Homme released a single titled "Dilemma", which was co-produced by RM and Bang Si-hyuk.

=== 2017–2021: Second mixtape Mono and further collaborations ===
In March 2017, RM collaborated with American rapper Wale on a special socially-charged track called "Change", released as a free digital download along with an accompanying music video filmed two weeks prior to the track's release. The pair first formed a relationship over Twitter, with Wale reaching out to RM in 2016, having seen RM's cover of his track "Illest Bitch". RM decided on the topic of "Change", saying that though the two rappers were extremely different, their commonality lay in the fact that both America and South Korea had their political and social situations and that both of them wanted the world to change for the better. One month later, RM featured on the track "Gajah" with Gaeko of Dynamic Duo. In December, RM collaborated with Fall Out Boy on a remix of their song "Champion". The track reached number 18 on Billboard's Bubbling Under Hot 100 Singles and helped RM reach number 46 on the Emerging Artists chart for the week of January 8, 2018. He also made history as the first K-pop artist to chart on the Rock Digital Songs chart, at number two.

RM released his second mixtape, Mono, which he referred to as a "playlist", on October 23, 2018. He became the first Korean artist to top the Emerging Artists chart in the United States with its release. The playlist was well-received by critics, who praised RM for laying "his deep insecurities bare on songs like 'Tokyo' and 'Seoul'". The track "Seoul" was produced by British electropop duo Honne, who first discovered RM after seeing him recommend their music on Twitter and eventually met him in Seoul following one of their concerts. In November, RM also collaborated with Tiger JK on the track "Timeless", as part of his final album under the Drunken Tiger stage name. Tiger JK originally expected RM's lyrics to contain self-praise, which was the trend of rap at the time; RM instead wrote lyrics about leaving behind the historical meaning of Drunken Tiger's name.

On March 25, 2019, Honne announced that RM would feature on a remake of their 2018 single "Crying Over You" alongside singer BEKA; it was released on March 27. Originally slated for a January 2019 release, the remake had been postponed due to "unforeseen circumstances". Chinese singer Bibi Zhou was added to the Chinese release, appearing with RM and replacing BEKA. The same day, Big Hit Entertainment released the song "Persona" as a trailer for BTS' Map of the Soul: Persona EP, performed as a solo by RM. Persona debuted at number 17 on Billboard's YouTube Song Chart. In July, RM featured on the fourth official remix of Lil Nas X's "Old Town Road", titled "Seoul Town Road", in which he "infuse[d]...his English-language verse with a surprisingly good Southern twang". The following year, RM featured on Younha's "Winter Flower"; it was released on January 6, 2020. This was followed by a feature on the track "Don't" by South Korean indie singer eAeon, from his second solo album released on April 30, 2021.

=== 2022–2024: Solo debut and military enlistment ===
During BTS' ninth anniversary celebrations, in June 2022, RM mentioned needing time to think about his direction as a member of BTS and as an individual. Pursuant to an accompanying announcement that the band would be devoting more attention to individual endeavors going forward—they went on an extended break from most group activities shortly afterwards—he featured on the single "Sexy Nukim" by "alternative K-pop group" Balming Tiger in September, and commercially released his debut solo studio album Indigo on December 2. Led by the single "Wild Flower", the album peaked at number three on the Billboard 200, making RM the highest-charting Korean solo artist in chart history at the time. In the same month, NPR Music released RM's Tiny Desk Concert performance of Indigo.

In 2023, RM traveled to Spain for inspiration for a second solo album. While there, in an interview with EFE—published in March—he reflected on the search for his own identity, after having followed the dictates of K-pop trends for the past 10 years as part of BTS, additionally revealing that he would "not be taking on any projects in the near future" in light of his approaching mandatory military service. RM featured on the single "Smoke Sprite" by So-yoon of Se So Neon, released on March 14, and was announced as the first celebrity brand ambassador for Bottega Veneta at the end of that month. In May, he featured on the single "Don't Ever Say Love Me" by Colde.

RM's second studio album, Right Place, Wrong Person, was released on May 24, 2024. It was his first project to be released during enlistment. Supported by the singles "Come Back to Me" and "Lost!", it debuted at number five on the Billboard 200 with 54,000 album-equivalent units sold, earning RM his highest debut entry on the chart and the largest opening sales week of his career. On September 6, he was featured by Megan Thee Stallion on her single "Neva Play", which went on to chart at number 36 on Billboard Hot 100 becoming RM's highest entry on the chart. A film documentary, RM: Right People, Wrong Place, directed by Lee Seok-jun and chronicling the eight-month period prior to RM's enlistment (including the album's creative process), premiered at the Busan International Film Festival in October. It was given a global theatrical release the following December.

=== 2025–present: Post enlistment and further career activities ===
In June 2025, post enlistment, RM returned to the spotlight as global ambassador for Samsung Art TV, championing the global art scene. RM held a special talk (hosted by Samsung Electronics) at Art Basel along with Clément Delépine, Director of Art Basel Paris and featured artist Basim Magdy. On October 2, 2025 it was announced that RM will be hosting his solo art exhibition titled RM x SFMOMA, involving art pieces from his personal collections, in collaboration with SFMOMA. The exhibition is running from October 2026 to February 2027. RM ventured into other career prospects by becoming an angel investor with Artue (an online art platform).

== Impact and influence ==
=== Musical influence and songwriting ===
In 2017, American hip-hop magazine XXL included RM in its list of "10 Korean Rappers You Should Know", with writer Peter A. Berry stating that "Rap Monster rarely fails to live up to his name". Berry described RM as "one of the region's most dexterous rappers, capable of switching flows effortlessly as he glides across an array of diverse instrumentals". Crystal Tai of the South China Morning Post noted that RM has "received much praise for his natural flow and lyrics". Speaking about RM's work, Noisey's Bianca Mendez wrote that "he's got some My Beautiful Dark Twisted Fantasy [by Kanye West] in him, but he's closer to...Earl Sweatshirt and Chance the Rapper in spirit, and that's exciting". In January 2020, he was promoted from associate to a full member of the Korea Music Copyright Association (KOMCA). As of October 2024, RM has 230 songs attributed to his name as a songwriter and composer by KOMCA, thereby extending his own record as the youngest most credited Korean-artist in history.

=== Public image ===
In a survey conducted by Gallup Korea, RM ranked as the 12th most preferred idol of the year for 2018. He ranked 11th in 2019. In 2018, RM was awarded the fifth-class Hwagwan Order of Cultural Merit by the President of South Korea, along with the other members of BTS, for his contributions to spreading Korean culture. In July 2021, he and the members of BTS were appointed Special Presidential Envoy for Future Generations and Culture by President Moon Jae-in to help "lead the global agenda for future generations, such as sustainable growth" and "expand South Korea's diplomatic efforts and global standing" in the international community.

On June 1, 2023, RM was appointed as the Public Relations Ambassador for South Korea's Ministry of National Defense Agency Remains Excavation and Investigation Team. The team's goal is to find and identify remains of war veterans from the Korean War.

RM was a keynote speaker at the APEC CEO Summit 2025 held on October 29, 2025, where he delivered a presentation on the theme "Cultural and Creative Industries in the APEC Region and the Soft Power of K-Culture", thereby becoming the first Korean artist to deliver a speech in the summit's history. On November 3, 2025, he was recognized as one of the "2025 Asia-Pacific U30 Outstanding Young Leaders" by the Asia-Pacific Entrepreneurs Association. He was ranked number six in the "K-Brand Index – Boy Group Individual" list released by Asia Brand Research Institute the following November 11.

=== Influence in art ===
RM has been named as one of the most influential persons in the global art scene. Exhibitions have seen a huge influx of visitors, many of them RM's fans, post his visit to their venues. In December 2022, Artnet placed RM in the "35 Innovators List" for driving forward every sector of the art market. Around the same time, the Cultural Heritage Administration recognised RM for his overseas efforts to help preserve and restore Korean cultural artefacts. On October 2, 2025 SFMOMA announced that they had reached out to RM sometime in late 2022 for a collaboration that resulted in the exhibition titled "RM x SFMOMA". As of October 3, 2026, the "RM x SFMOMA" exhibition opened, allowing visitors to view nearly 150 of RM's personal collection of art. While the pieces primarily focus on contemporary Korean artwork, it allows visitors to interact with different kinds of art mediums. On October 12, 2025 RM was included in the "Korea Art Market - Power 20" list compiled by SNU Business School and Paradise Cultural Foundation, which includes 20 movers and shakers of the Korean art market. On June 19, 2026 he was named the global ambassador for the National Museum of Korea.

== Other ventures ==
=== Art curator ===
Year(s)	Title	Notes	Ref.
2026–2027	RM x SFMOMA	As lead curator	

=== Narrator ===
RM has predominantly narrated ad campaigns in international sport and audio guides of renowned global art museums.

Year	Title	Notes	Ref.
2022	Goal of the Century	For Hyundai x FIFA World Cup 2022	
2022	The Space Between: The Modern in Korean Art	Audio Guide for LACMA	
2026	Between You and Me	Bilingual audio guide for RM x SFMOMA	

=== Fashion and endorsements ===
RM's fashion journey has been a widely covered topic. His fashion sense evolved from street-savvy fashion to high-end luxury over the years. RM became the first celebrity brand ambassador for Italian quiet luxury fashion house Bottega Veneta in 2023. He attended Bottega Veneta's Fall/Winter 2023 and Spring/Summer 2026 shows as a part of Milan Fashion Week. He has graced the covers of international fashion magazines such as Dazed Korea, GQ Japan, Harper's Bazaar Korea and Vogue Korea. In addition to fashion, RM has served as campaign ambassador for Iloom, a home furnishing brand, and as global brand ambassador for Samsung Art TV.

== Personal life ==
RM underwent septoplasty for his nasal septum deviation in 2018 and temporarily withdrew from band activities while recovering from the operation.

Since 2018, RM has lived in Hannam-dong, Seoul, South Korea with his bandmates. In November 2019, he bought a property in the Yongsan District of Seoul for ₩4.9 billion (equivalent to ₩5.74 billion or US$4.29 million in 2025), then sold it the following year for ₩5.8 billion (equivalent to ₩6.76 billion or US$5.05 million in 2025). He later bought another home in Hannam-dong worth US$5.7 million.

=== Philanthropy ===
For his 25th birthday, RM donated ₩100 million (equivalent to ₩117.23 million or US$87,468.18 in 2025) to the Seoul Samsun School to help hearing-impaired students receive music education. In September 2023, he donated ₩100 million (US$74,611.5) to the National Forensic Service of South Korea, to be used for the development of forensic science in the country. In September 2024, for his 30th birthday, he donated ₩100 million (US$74,611.5) to the Funds for Veterans. The donation will be allocated through "Everyone's Veterans' Dream" and the "Uniformed Workers Appreciation Campaign," as part of the Ministry of Patriots and Veterans Affairs' efforts, to provide welfare and treatment to uniformed service personnel and their bereaved families. In March 2025, RM donated ₩100 million (US$74,611.5) to the Hope Bridge Disaster Relief Association for wildfire relief efforts due to wildfire damages in the Ulsan, Gyeongbuk, and Gyeongnam regions. In September 2025, for his 31st birthday, he donated a total of ₩200 million (US$149,223) to Seoul Asan Medical Center and Korea University Medical Center.

=== Art patronage ===
RM embraced collecting art after a chance visit to the Art Institute of Chicago in 2018. He mentioned about experiencing Stendhal Syndrome while observing art works by Seurat and Monet being drawn to 20th-century artists like Yun Hyong-keun, Chang Ucchin, and Nam June Paik. Some of RM's notable art collections include Roni Horn's glass sculpture, KAWS figurines and Takashi Murakami's "Flower Ball (3-D), Kindergarten (2007)". In the spring of 2020, RM acquired "Disappearing Hometown 730", a luminescent landscape by South Korean artist Joung Young Ju.

In December 2020, the Arts Council of Korea named him one of its ten 2020 Patrons of the Arts in recognition of his ₩100 million (equivalent to ₩116.61 million or US$87,000.74 in 2025) donation to the National Museum of Modern and Contemporary Art for the printing and distribution of various rare art books to schools and libraries in rural and mountainous regions. Since September 2021, he has consecutively donated ₩100 million annually towards the preservation and restoration of cultural artifacts overseas, through the Cultural Heritage Administration (CHA) and the Overseas Cultural Heritage Foundation. His first donation, originally made privately, was used for treatment of a hwarot owned by the Los Angeles County Museum of Art (LACMA) at the time, while his 2022 donation was used for the creation of an art brochure introducing Korean paintings.

In September 2026, RM donated 100 million won to the National Museum of Korea. The donation will be used to support the acquisition and donation of cultural artifacts.

=== Military service ===
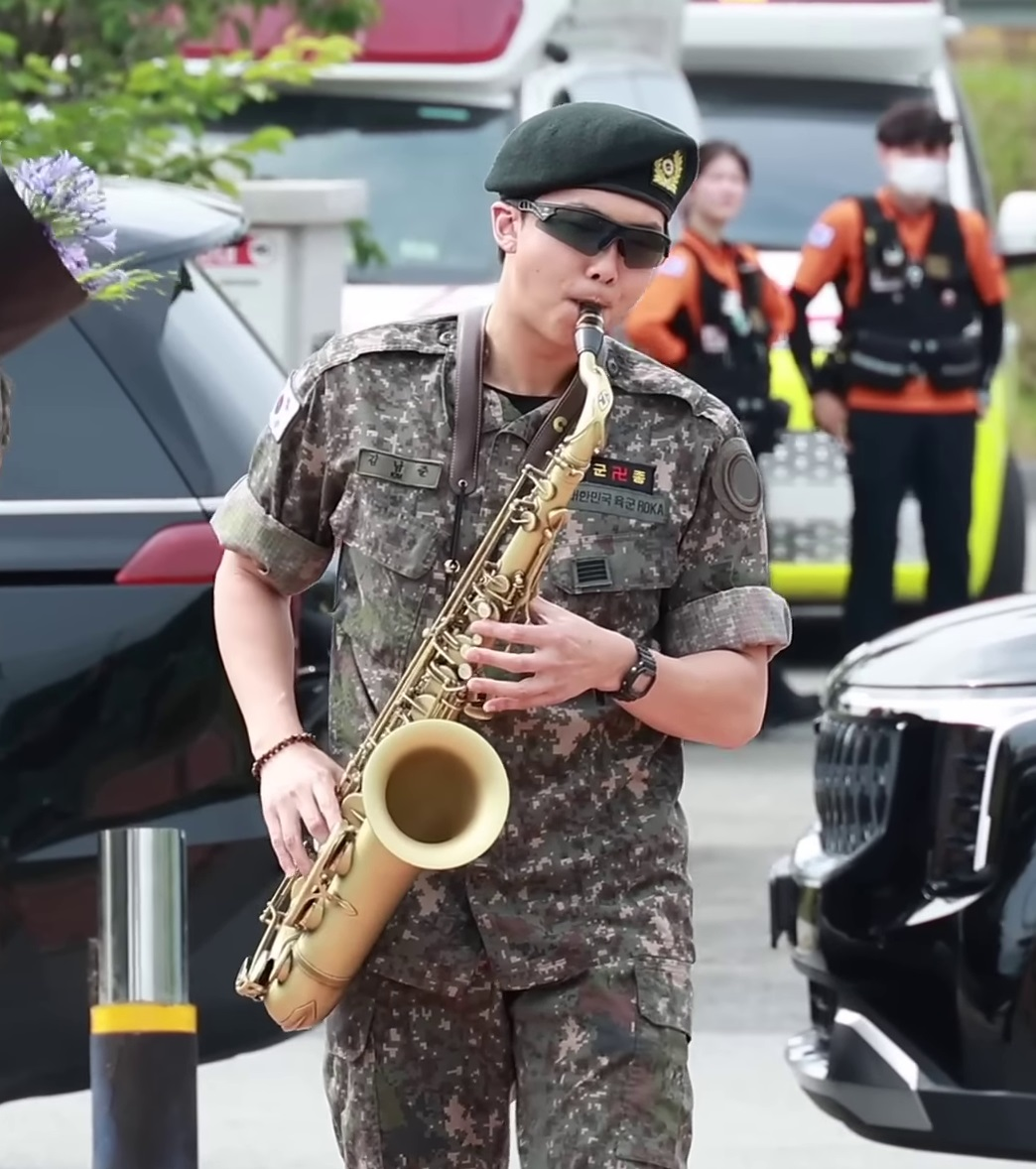
RM playing saxophone at military discharge in June 2025

On November 22, 2023, Big Hit announced through Weverse that RM, along with bandmates V, Jimin, and Jung Kook, had started the enlistment process to carry out his mandatory military service. He began his military service on December 11, 2023, as an active duty soldier. He graduated from the five-week boot camp training at the Korea Army Training Center in Nonsan with the rank of private. He served in the military band of the Republic of Korea Army's 15th Infantry Division and was formally discharged on June 10, 2025.

== Discography ==
Studio albums

- Indigo (2022)
- Right Place, Wrong Person (2024)

Mixtapes

- RM (2015)
- Mono (2018)

== Filmography ==
=== Films ===
Year	Title	Role	Notes	Ref.
2024	RM: Right People, Wrong Place	Himself	Documentary film	

=== Television ===
Year	Title	Role	Episode(s)	Note(s)	Ref(s)
2014	4things Show – Rap Monster	Himself	3	Documentary about Rap Monster	
2015	Hot Brain: Problematic Men	Cast member	1–22	Quiz/knowledge show	
2015	Inkigayo	Host	842	with Sungjae (BtoB)	
2016	Close-up Observation Diary on Idol: Find Me	Himself	2	Reality show about his daily life	
2016	Gura-Chacha: Time Slip – New Boy	Cast member	Pilot	Reality show	
2016	Inkigayo	Host	862-863	with Jin, Kei & Mijoo (Lovelyz)	
2016	KCON New York	Host	—N/a	with Ailee	
2017	M Countdown	Host	—N/a	with J-Hope and Jimin	
2022	The Dictionary of Useless Knowledge	Host	1–9	tvN series co-hosted with Jang Hang-jun; aired December 2, 2022 to January 27, 2023	

=== Podcasts ===
Year	Title	Host	Notes	Ref.
2022	Intersections Season 2, Episode 1: RM (Kim Nam-joon) - BTS Leader	Art Basel	Guest; 1 episode	
2026	Fashion Neurosis	Bella Freud	Guest; 1 episode	

== Live performances ==
=== Concerts ===
==== In person ====
Title	Date	City	Country	Venue	Performed song(s)	Note(s)	Ref.
RM Live in Seoul	December 5, 2022	Seoul	South Korea	Rolling Hall	List of songs performed: “Yun (with Erykah Badu)”; “Still Life (with Anderson .Paak)”; “All Day (with Tablo)”; “Closer (with Paul Blanco, Mahalia)”; “Lonely”; “Forg_tful (with Kim Sawol)”; “Hectic (with Colde)”; “Wild Flower (with youjeen)”; “Sexy Nukim (feat. RM of BTS)”; “Intro : Persona"	Limited audience (invite only)	
D-Day Tour	August 6, 2023	Seoul	South Korea	KSPO Dome	List of songs performed: “Strange - AgustD ft. RM”; “Come back to me”	As guest performer	

==== Direct online ====
Title	Date	Location	Performed song(s)	Ref.
RM of BTS: Tiny Desk (Home) Concert	December 2, 2022	Seoul, South Korea	List of songs performed: “seoul (prod. honne)”; “Yun (with Erykah Badu)”; “Still Life (with Anderson .Paak)”	
RM Live in New York	December 8, 2022	Dia Beacon, USA	List of songs performed: “Wildflower (with youjeen)”; “Still Life (with Anderson .Paak)”; “Change pt. 2”; “No.2 (with parkjiyoon)”	
[Live clip] Colde ft. RM	May 29, 2023	Seoul, South Korea	List of songs performed: “Don’t ever say you love me - Colde ft. RM”	

=== Events and music festivals ===
Event	Date	City	Country	Venue	Performed song(s)	Note(s)	Ref.
All Force One - Hot & Cool	September 20, 2015	Seoul	South Korea	Yes 24 Live Hall (formerly AX-Korea)	List of songs performed: “Awakening”; “Do You”; “Like A Star”; “We On + Hip Hop Phile”; “Monster”; “Throw it away”; “BTS Cypher PT.2: Triptych”; “BTS Cypher PT.3: Killer”; “Life”	RM, Verbal Jint and Paloalto were the event headliners	
Love Your W	October 28, 2022	Seoul	South Korea	Four Seasons Hotel	List of songs performed: Sexy Nukim (with Balming Tiger)	Performance was in aid of W Korea's breast cancer awareness campaign	

=== Television shows and specials ===
Event	Date	City	Country	Performed song(s)	Ref.
Duet Song Festival	July 1, 2016	Seoul	South Korea	"Umbrella"	

== Accolades ==
=== Awards and nominations ===
Name of the award ceremony, year presented, nominee(s) of the award, award category, and the result of the nomination
Award ceremony	Year	Category	Nominee(s)/work(s)	Result	Ref.
American Music Awards	2025	Favorite K-Pop Artist	RM	Won	
Asia Artist Awards	2026	Popularity Award – Solo (Male)	RM	Pending	
Creative Circle	2025	Music Video – Promo Film : Single	"Lost!"	Silver	
The Fact Music Awards	2023	Best Music (Winter)	"Wild Flower"	Nominated	
The Fact Music Awards	2023	Fan N Star Choice Award – Individual	RM	Nominated	
The Fact Music Awards	2025	Best Music (Summer)	"Stop the Rain" (with Tablo)	Longlisted	
Grammy Awards	2023	Album of the Year	Music of the Spheres (as songwriter)	Nominated	
Hanteo Music Awards	2025	Special Award – Hip-hop	RM	Won	
Hanteo Music Awards	2025	Global Artist – Africa	RM	Nominated	
Korea Grand Music Awards	2025	Best Listener's Pick	"Stop the Rain" (with Tablo)	Nominated	
Korean Hip-hop Awards	2023	Collaboration of the Year	"Sexy Nukim" (with Balming Tiger)	Won	
Korean Hip-hop Awards	2023	Music Video of the Year	"Sexy Nukim" (with Balming Tiger)	Won	
MAMA Awards	2024	Fans' Choice Top 10 – Male	RM	Won	
MAMA Awards	2024	Best Hip Hop & Rap Music	"Lost!"	Nominated	
MAMA Awards	2024	Song of the Year	"Lost!"	Longlisted	
MAMA Awards	2025	Best Hip Hop & Rap Music	"Stop the Rain" (with Tablo)	Nominated	
MAMA Awards	2025	Song of the Year	"Stop the Rain" (with Tablo)	Longlisted	
Music Awards Japan	2025	Best of Listeners' Choice: International Song	"Neva Play" (with Megan Thee Stallion)	Won	
Patrons of the Arts Awards	2020	Art Patron of the Year	Kim Nam-joon	Won	
SEC Awards	2023	Asian Musical Artist of the Year	RM	Won	
SEC Awards	2026	Asian Artist of the Year	RM	Nominated	
SEC Awards	2026	International Feat of the Year	"Stop the Rain" (with Tablo)	Nominated	
Seoul Music Awards	2023	Fan Choice of the Year – April	RM	Nominated	
Seoul Music Awards	2025	R&B / Hip-Hop Award	RM	Won	
Shark Awards	2025	Best Music Video – International	"Lost!"	Won	
Shark Awards	2025	Best R&B / Soul Video – International	"Lost!"	Won	
Shots Awards EMEA	2024	Music Video of the Year	"Lost!"	Nominated	
SXSW Awards	2025	Music Video Competition	"Lost!"	Nominated	
SXSW Awards	2025	Music Video Competition	"Neva Play" (with Megan Thee Stallion)	Nominated	
UK Music Video Awards	2024	Best Alternative Video – International	"Lost!"	Won	
Universal Superstar Awards	2024	KM Chart Top 6 - Best K-Music Artist	RM	Won	

=== Listicles ===
Name of publisher, year listed, name of listicle, and placement
Publisher	Year	Listicle	Placement	Ref.
Artnet	2022	35 Innovators	Included	
Asia-Pacific Entrepreneurs Association (APEA)	2025	Asia-Pacific U30 Outstanding Young Leaders	Included	
Billboard	2024	K-Pop Artist 100	61st	
Billboard	2025	K-Pop Artist 100	99th	
Forbes Korea	2026	Power Celebrity 40	11th	
Rolling Stone Korea	2024	Star of the Year: Domestic	Included	
SNU Business School and Paradise Cultural Foundation	2025	Power 20 – Korea Art Market	Included	
