= RM x SFMOMA: Between You and Me =

2026–2027 art exhibition at SFMOMA curated by RM

- Exhibition poster
- Date: October 3, 2026 to February 7, 2027; October 1, 2026 to October 3, 2026 (Member previews); September 29, 2026 (Press preview)
- Duration: 128 days
- Venue: San Francisco Museum of Modern Art
- Location: San Francisco, California, United States
- Also known as: RM x SFMOMA
- Type: Art exhibition
- Theme: Korean modern and contemporary art
- Organized by: SFMOMA
- Participants: Curators: RM; América Castillo; Hyoeun Kim
- Website: Official website

RM x SFMOMA: Between You and Me is an art exhibition at the San Francisco Museum of Modern Art (SFMOMA) in San Francisco, California, curated by South Korean rapper-songwriter RM in collaboration with SFMOMA curators América Castillo and Hyoeun Kim. It brings together works from RM's personal collection and works from SFMOMA's collection, including modern and contemporary Korean art presented alongside international art. The exhibition opened to the general public on October 3, 2026, and is scheduled to run until February 7, 2027.

== Background ==
In June 2022, RM discussed the possibility of opening a space to showcase his art collection during an interview on the Art Basel Podcast.

In 2022, SFMOMA approached RM about a potential exhibition collaboration. RM later said that the museum presented him with the exhibition proposal while he was completing his mandatory military service, and that the project was subsequently developed over approximately two years.

On October 2, 2025, SFMOMA announced that RM would curate an exhibition featuring works from his personal collection.

The exhibition was developed as a dialogue between works from RM's collection and works from SFMOMA's collection, bringing Korean and international modern and contemporary art together across different periods and contexts.

Ticket reservations for museum members opened on August 4, 2026, with general ticket sales beginning August 11, 2026.

== Exhibition ==
The exhibition has nearly 200 works, with approximately three-quarters from RM's collection and one-quarter from the museum's collection. The exhibition's presentation of Korean art spans from the fifth century to the present and includes paintings, drawings, sculptures, ceramics, textiles and design works.

Most of the works from RM's collection were being shown in the United States for the first time.

RM's collection includes works by Korean artists including Yun Hyong-keun, Park Rehyun, Chang Ucchin, Kwon Okyon, Kim Yun Shin and To Sangbong. Works from SFMOMA's collection include artists such as Kim Whanki, Nam June Paik, Mark Rothko, Agnes Martin, Henri Matisse and Georgia O'Keeffe.

The exhibition places works by Korean artists alongside works by artists from other countries, such as a presentation of a work by Yun Hyong-keun from RM's collection alongside a work by Mark Rothko from SFMOMA's collection.

The presentation includes bilingual wall texts and artwork labels written by RM, as well as audio guides in English and Korean recorded by him. RM also selected music for an in-gallery playlist.

=== Exhibition sections ===
The exhibition is divided into eight sections: "Bluewater", "Friendscape", "Home", "Photo Buddha", "People", "Passion", "I Don't Know But I Like It", and "Umber", organized around different emotions and interests. The "Bluewater" section groups works around themes of infinity and metaphysical space, using blue pigments as a visual motif. Both the "Home" and "Passion" sections include themes of comfort and human resilience. RM described the "I Don't Know But I Like It" section as reflecting his uncertainty about why he collected some works, emphasizing that appreciation of art does not always require an explanation based on art history or criticism.

== Curatorial approach ==
RM planned and curated the exhibition with América Castillo and Hyoeun Kim. He developed the exhibition's concept with the SFMOMA curators and participated in selecting the works.

The selection and pairing of works were informed by art-historical context, artistic technique and emotional associations. SFMOMA said that RM's perspective was incorporated into the exhibition's selection, gallery art direction, questions posed to visitors, wall texts and artwork labels.

At the September 29, 2026 preview, RM said that two questions had guided his selection of works: whether a work moved him and whether the artist and work still had something to say in 2026.

== Themes ==
RM has described the exhibition in terms of boundaries between East and West, Korea and America, modern and contemporary art, and the personal and the universal. He said that he did not want to prescribe how the works should be viewed and that different perspectives were welcome.

SFMOMA describes his collection as being built on personal resonance, with his perspective incorporated into the selection and presentation of the works.

The exhibition places Korean and international artworks in dialogue through shared themes including nature, memory and human existence. SFMOMA describes the presentation as inviting visitors to encounter familiar works in a new light and to form their own connections with the works.

== Impact ==
SFMOMA membership sign-ups following the exhibition announcement were the highest in the museum's history, while the first 24 hours of member reservations generated 12,000 reservations, about 84% of which were from new members.

SFMOMA reported that approximately 7,500 people had visited during its pre-opening and opening days, while more than 66,000 ticket reservations had been made by October 24. Advance ticket sales were six times higher than for any previous SFMOMA exhibition before opening, and nearly 500 SFMOMA memberships were sold in the preceding week.

The National Museum Foundation of Korea exported approximately US$110,000 worth of its MU:DS products for sale at SFMOMA, its largest single export to an overseas museum. The initial order was about 71% higher than the combined value of two shipments made for the previous year's exhibition of the Lee Kun-hee Collection at the Smithsonian.

SFMOMA said that its Museum Store more than doubled its previous record for opening-day exhibition merchandise sales, with additional products scheduled to be restocked during the exhibition.

== Public and media response ==
When member ticket reservations opened on August 4, 2026, SFMOMA experienced unusually high web traffic, and some visitors encountered online queues exceeding one hour.

A press preview was held at SFMOMA on September 29, 2026, ahead of the exhibition's public opening. RM attended the preview and spoke about his first experience serving as a museum co-curator, saying that he was nervous about the role. He described the exhibition as a personal introduction to his collection and perspective, while suggesting that his position as an outsider to the professional art world could bring a different perspective to the curatorial process.

The preview received coverage from Korean and international media, with journalists and photographers documenting the exhibition and RM's involvement in its presentation. Fans also gathered outside SFMOMA, including visitors who had travelled from Europe. Some fans distributed handmade items to visitors and members of the media. The Art Newspaper discussed RM's presentation of his Korean art collection within the museum setting and the exhibition's relationship to his personal approach to collecting.

== Notable exhibits ==
=== Nam June Paik's works in "Photo Buddha" ===
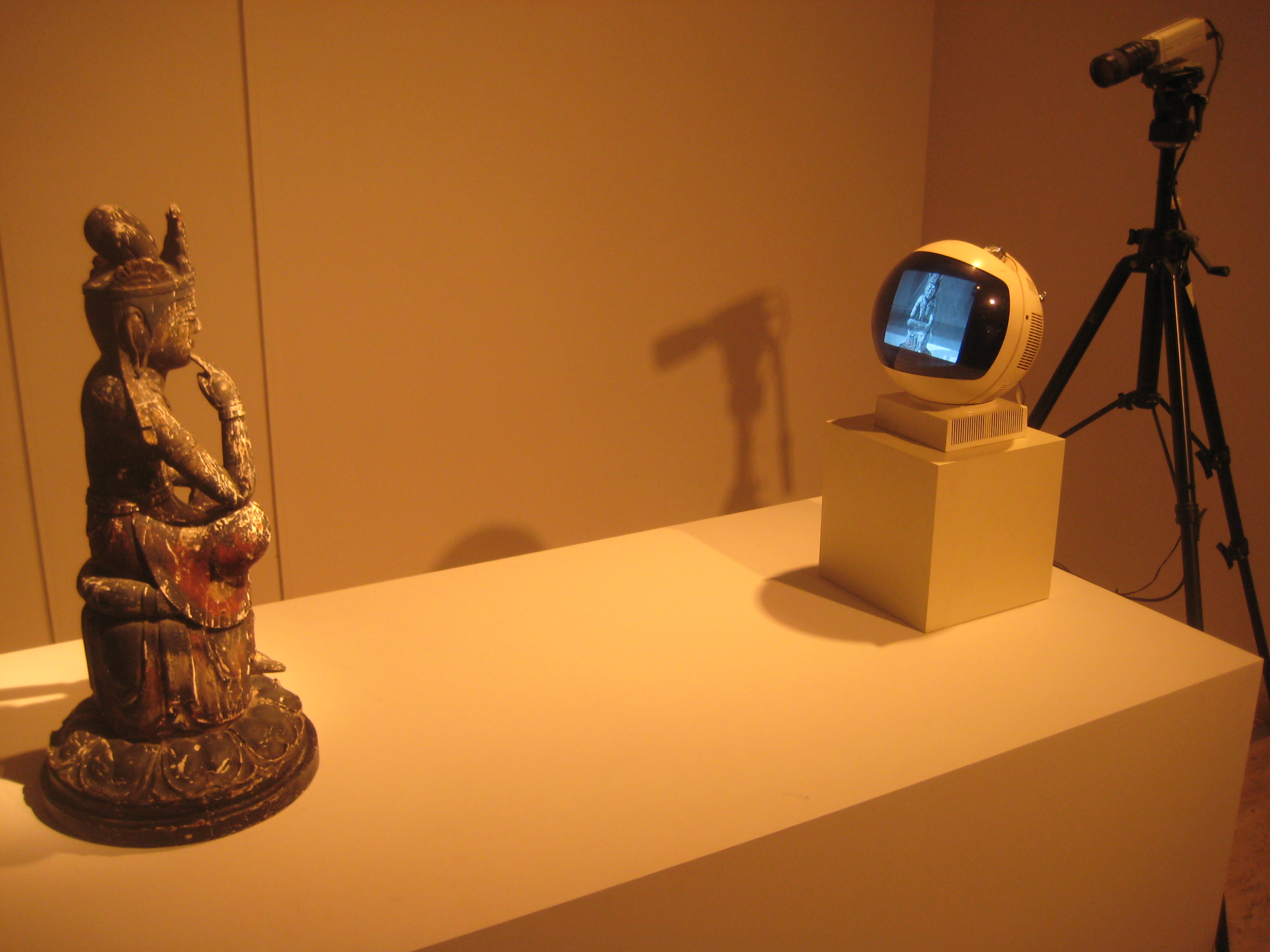
A TV Buddha sculpture

The exhibition's "Photo Buddha" section pairs Nam June Paik's video sculpture: TV Buddha from SFMOMA's collection with Enlightenment Compressed, a smaller work by Paik from RM's collection. RM described the pairing as bringing together the museum's drawing with the work he had collected, inviting visitors to consider the relationship between technology and religion.

=== Kim Whanki's 26-I-70 #141 ===
Kim Whanki's 26-I-70 #141 (1970), from SFMOMA's collection, is displayed in the exhibition's "Bluewater" section alongside another painting by Kim, 15-VII-70 #181, and Yves Klein's Éponge (SE251) (1961). SFMOMA describes the pairing as bringing together works that use blue as a metaphysical or philosophical space associated with the cosmic and infinite.

== See also ==
- RM (musician)
- San Francisco Museum of Modern Art
- Korean art
- Modern art
- Contemporary art
