= Stop the Rain =

- Official single digital cover

Single by Tablo and RM
- Released: May 2, 2025
- Genre: Hip hop; K-rap
- Length: 3:10
- Label: OURS CO
- Songwriters: Anthony Watts; RM; Tablo; Will Leong

Tablo singles chronology
"U (with Stray Kids)" (2024)	"Stop the Rain" (2025)

RM singles chronology
"Neva Play" (2024)	"Stop the Rain" (2025)

Music video
- "Stop the Rain" on YouTube

"Stop the Rain" (stylized as 'Stop The Rain (TABLO X RM)' is a single by Canadian rapper Tablo and South Korean rapper RM. It was released on May 2, 2025, through OURS CO. A music video was released simultaneously with the single's release.

== Background and release ==
In January 2023, a month after the release of RM and Tablo’s first collaboration song "All Day", Tablo teased that their second collaboration work was in the pipeline. Tablo, made a decision to withhold release of the track earlier out of respect for RM, who was serving mandatory military service at the time. Tablo described the song as “pages from our journals,” and that it is a personal archive of both artists.

In early 2025, RM personally reached out to Tablo and suggested that the song be finally released. A teaser for the music video was published on April 24, 2025 via Tablo’s official Instagram page. The single was announced for global release in May of the same year.

== Music and writing ==
The song combines Tablo’s signature emotional lyricism with RM’s deep, charismatic voice. It is a mid-tempo rap tune built on chiming electric guitar and a thumping beat following chipmunk sampling.

In an interview with Weverse magazine, Tablo explained that reason for having chosen theme of rain in their lyrics was because concepts of rain and rainy days show up in Epik High’s music all the time. RM has songs such as “forever rain,” too, and there has always been a rainy sentiment to BTS’s music.

== Commercial performance ==
The song debuted in Spotify’s Daily Top Songs charts at 106th position with 1.5 million streams on its release day.

On May 3, 2025, it debuted at number five on the US iTunes charts and climbed up to the number one spot. Subsequently, it reached number one position on iTunes charts in around 55 countries.

An official lucky draw event was announced on May 10, 2025 wherein winners would receive limited edition commemorative deck of Stop the Rain themed playing cards. The event lasted from May 10–13, garnering over 100,000 applications creating a fierce competition for just three spots.

The song was included in Spotify’s mid-year "Global Impact List - South Korea" on July 21, 2025.

== Music video ==
The music video is animated in lo-fi style. It starts off by depicting a young child whose mental health issues make them feel like they are in a free fall. Throughout the video there are black-and-white visuals depicting characters submerged in water, caught in endless rain, while being suspended in an emotional limbo.

== Charts ==
Weekly chart performance for "Stop the Rain"
Chart (2024)	Peak position
Global 200 (Billboard)	178
India International Singles (IMI)	8
New Zealand Hot Singles (RMNZ)	25
UK Official Singles Downloads Chart (OCC)	9
UK Official Singles Sales Chart (OCC)	10
US Digital Song Sales (Billboard)	4
US Rap Digital Song Sales (Billboard)	1

== Awards and nominations ==
Awards and nominations for "Stop the Rain"
Award ceremony	Year	Category	Result	Ref.
The Fact Music Awards	2025	Best Music (Summer)	Longlisted	
KGMA	2025	Best Listener's Pick	Nominated	
MAMA Awards	2025	Best Rap & Hip Hop Performance	Nominated	
MAMA Awards	2025	Song of the Year	Longlisted	
SEC Awards	2026	International Feat of the Year	Nominated	
