= Fashion Neurosis =

Fashion podcast hosted by Bella Freud

Fashion Neurosis with Bella Freud
- Genre: Fashion
- Country of origin: United Kingdom
- Language: English

Creative team
- Created by: Bella Freud

Cast and voices
- Hosted by: Bella Freud

Production
- Length: 1 hour

Publication
- Original release: October 1, 2024

Fashion Neurosis, or Fashion Neurosis with Bella Freud, is a podcast hosted by London-based fashion designer Bella Freud. Taking after the practice of psychoanalysis, each hour-long episode resembles a therapy session with the interviewee lying down on a couch. The podcast seeks to foster conversations that tackle the relationship between fashion and "emotional health" or what Virginia Woolf referred to as frock consciousness. Early guests on the podcast included Courteney Cox, Zadie Smith, and Kate Moss.

== Background and release ==
Freud wanted to host a podcast, with "people who didn't really talk a lot," to facilitate more "complex and interesting" conversations about fashion than typically reflected in current media. She then came up with the idea of a couch and chair setup, like a therapist's office, as "a way to learn vicariously all the things I’ve secretly wanted to know" and use fashion as a means to interrogate questions of identity and self-consciousness. Freud, the great-granddaughter of Sigmund Freud, told Another Magazine that she was unafraid of leaning into her family relation to psychoanalysis through the podcast's form:

I just thought, well, someone’s going to do that at some point, I might as well play with it. Obviously it’s tongue-in-cheek and I’m not taking myself seriously in that role, I’m just using some of the aesthetics, some of the strategies.

The podcast launched in October of 2024 on Apple Podcasts and Spotify. Its first episode showed Freud speaking with American fashion designer Rick Owens, and the podcast immediately became the number one fashion and beauty podcast in the United Kingdom. The podcast was critically acclaimed upon launch; Vogue called it one of the best podcasts of 2024.

The podcast has both audio and video components. The latter is filmed with several camera angles including a camera directly positioned above the interviewee's face "like a beady eye." Freud stated she "had a clear idea about how I wanted the filming to look. I found a great cinematographer and we worked on getting the perfect light. To get the guests I want, the lighting has to be amazing—flattering and atmospheric."

== Episodes ==
=== 2024 ===
Date	Guest
October 1, 2024	Rick Owens
October 8, 2024	Eric Cantona
October 15, 2024	Trinny Woodall
October 22, 2024	Courteney Cox
October 30, 2024	Kim Gordon
November 6, 2024	Zadie Smith
November 20, 2024	Daphne Guinness
November 27, 2024	Kristin Scott Thomas
December 4, 2024	Karl Ove Knausgård
December 11, 2024	Jonathan Anderson
December 18, 2024	Nicky Haslam

=== 2025 ===
Date	Guest
January 15, 2025	Nick Cave
January 22, 2025	Princess Julia
January 29, 2025	Stefano Pilati
February 5, 2025	Cate Blanchett
February 12, 2025	Honey Dijon
February 19, 2025	Juergen Teller
February 26, 2025	Gwendoline Christie
March 5, 2025	Haider Ackermann
March 12, 2025	Julianne Moore
March 18, 2025	John Cooper Clarke
March 26, 2025	Christian Louboutin
April 2, 2025	Bobby Gillespie
April 9, 2025	Susie Cave
April 16, 2025	Hanif Kureishi
April 23, 2025	Es Devlin
April 30, 2025	Marina Abramovic
May 7, 2025	Sam McKnight
May 14, 2025	Bethann Hardison
May 21, 2025	Graydon Carter
May 28, 2025	Alex Consani
June 4, 2025	Rachel Jones
June 11, 2025	Courtney Love
June 18, 2025	Haim
June 25, 2025	Lorde
July 2, 2025	Alessandro Michele
July 9, 2025	Beth Ditto
July 15, 2025	Mia Khalifa
July 23, 2025	Nick Knight
September 3, 2025	John Malkovich
September 10, 2025	Amelia Dimoldenberg
September 17, 2025	Rachel Kushner
September 24, 2025	Kojey Radical
October 1, 2025	Zandra Rhodes
October 8, 2025	David Cronenberg
October 15, 2025	Ocean Vuong
October 22, 2025	Tessa Thompson
October 29, 2025	Arthur Jafa
November 5, 2025	Alexa Chung
November 12, 2025	Rosalía
November 19, 2025	Ib Kamara
November 26, 2025	Richard Russell
December 3, 2025	Annie Leibovitz
December 10, 2025	Willy Chavarria
December 17, 2025	Helena Bonham Carter

=== 2026 ===
Date	Guest
January 7, 2026	Debbie Harry
January 14, 2026	Hilton Als
January 21, 2026	Christy Turlington
January 28, 2026	Alexi Wasser
February 4, 2026	Abiodun Oyewole
February 11, 2026	Esther Perel
February 18, 2026	Charlotte Gainsbourg
February 25, 2026	Richard E. Grant
March 4, 2026	Erin O'Connor
March 11, 2026	Matières Fécales
March 18, 2026	David Byrne
March 25, 2026	Riz Ahmed
April 1, 2026	Lynne Ramsay
April 8, 2026	Thom Browne
April 22, 2026	Arlo Parks
April 29, 2026	Kristen McMenamy
May 6, 2026	Dan Levy
May 13, 2026	FKA Twigs
May 20, 2026	Jerry Hall
May 27, 2026	Peaches
June 3, 2026	Stephen Jones
June 10, 2026	Colm Tóibín
June 17, 2026	John Currin
June 24, 2026	Charli XCX
July 1, 2026	Leïla Slimani
July 8, 2026	Flea
July 15, 2026	Rashida Jones
July 22, 2026	RM
July 29, 2026	Shania Twain
August 5, 2026	Laurie Anderson
September 2, 2026	David Sedaris
September 9, 2026	Anthony Vaccarello
September 16, 2026	Martine Syms
September 23, 2026	Carlos Acosta
September 30, 2026	Glenn Martens
October 7, 2026	Tim Walker
October 14, 2026	Blindboy
October 21, 2026	Grace Coddington
October 28, 2026	Nathaniel Mary Quinn
November 4, 2026	Simone Rocha
