= Right People, Wrong Place =

2024 documentary film

RM: Right People, Wrong Place
- Film poster
- Directed by: Lee Seok-Jun
- Based on: Right Place, Wrong Person by RM
- Produced by: Suh Gyewon; Helena Chang; Lee Chanwoo; Ahn Minji
- Starring: RM; San Yawn; Jnkyrd; Jang Sehoon; Son Jimin; Oh Hyuk; Little Simz; Kim Hanjoo; Mokyo
- Narrated by: RM
- Production company: Hybe Corporation
- Distributed by: CJ 4DPLEX
- Release dates: 7 October 2024 (BIFF); 3 December 2024 (JAFF); 5 December 2024 (Worldwide)
- Running time: 80 minutes
- Country: South Korea
- Language: Korean

RM: Right People, Wrong Place is a documentary that chronicles the making of South Korean rapper RM’s second solo album while also serving as a personal journal of Kim Namjoon (his real name). It reveals his everyday thoughts and feelings to the world. The documentary premiered at the 29th BIFF on October 7, 2024, in the Open Cinema section of the festival.

== Release and promotion ==
On September 3, 2024, Big Hit Music announced the premiere of RM’s documentary at the 29th Busan International Film Festival. On October 29, 2024 further official announcements of a global theatrical premiere indicated its worldwide release date to be December 5, 2024.

Starting December 5, 2024 the documentary was released in 107 countries in a phased manner across select screens.

== Critical reception ==
Professional ratings
Review scores
Source	Rating
NME	5/5 stars
CNN Indonesia	5/5 stars

Rhian Daly of NME praised the documentary by explaining "The best music documentaries take you into the heart of something – an album, a concert, a tour or an artist’s entire journey. They give you new insight into the music you love or the stories that have become so legendary they feel like myths. They make you feel like you’re a part of the subject, witnessing it firsthand, living and breathing it. RM: Right People, Wrong Place ticks all those boxes".

CNN Indonesia’s Riva Dessthania appreciated RM stating that "The film also shows RM's experimental side. RM tries to play with new colors and genres outside of BTS and even K-Pop, by working with various musicians and producers."

== Festival screenings ==
Festival	Section	Screening Dates	Notes	Ref
Busan International Film Festival	Open Cinema	October 7, 2024	World premiere	
Jogja-NETPAC Asian Film Festival	Panorama	December 3, 2024; December 4, 2024	Indonesian premiere	
Helsinki Cine Aasia Film Festival	—N/a	March 16, 2024	—N/a	
