= Neva Play =

Single by Megan Thee Stallion featuring RM

from the album Megan: Act II
- Released: September 6, 2024
- Genre: Hip hop; K-rap
- Length: 2:38
- Label: Hot Girl; Warner
- Songwriters: Adrienne Haim; Brandon Hamlin; Julian Mason; Megan Pete; Nam-joon Kim; Peter Fenn; Shad Jacobs
- Producers: B HAM; Peter Fenn; Shae Jacobs

Megan Thee Stallion singles chronology
"Mamushi" (2024)	"Neva Play" (2024)	"BBA" (2024)

RM singles chronology
"Lost!" (2024)	"Neva Play" (2024)	"Stop the Rain" (2025)

Music video
- "Neva Play" on YouTube

"Neva Play" is a song by American rapper and songwriter Megan Thee Stallion featuring South Korean rapper RM of BTS. It was released on September 6, 2024, through Hot Girl Productions and Warner Music Group, as the lead single from Megan: Act II (2024), the deluxe reissue of the former's third studio album, Megan (2024). The song was used as the official theme song for WWE SmackDown on the USA Network from September 13, 2024 to September 4, 2026.

== Background ==
After departing from 1501 Certified Entertainment, Megan Thee Stallion founded her own independent label Hot Girl Productions and released her third studio album, Megan, on June 28, 2024, which included the US Billboard Hot 100 number-one single "Hiss". The rapper had previously collaborated with South Korean boy band BTS on the remix to their song "Butter" in 2021. She started hinting at a new collaboration with the group on August 29, 2024, by tweeting the emojis "🐎X💜 👀", to which the band's account replied the following day with the text "🐎X🦔(🐨) “Coming Soon! 💜👀". On September 1, she officially announced the collaboration, titled "Neva Play", was with BTS member RM and would be released on September 6, 2024. Alongside the announcement, she posted the single's cover art depicting her with blue hair and flashing cash while RM casually looks over his shoulder, and teased that "This is one of my favorite RM verses I’ve heard! I’ve never heard him rap in this style before.”

== Music video ==
The music video for "Neva Play" was released on YouTube simultaneously with the single. In the video, Megan raps in live-action clips, while RM appears through animation for his verse.

== Awards and nominations ==
Year	Ceremony	Category	Result	Ref.
2025	Music Awards Japan	Best of Listeners' Choice: International Song	Won	

== Charts ==
Chart performance for "Neva Play"
Chart (2024)	Peak position
Australia Hip Hop/R&B (ARIA)	20
Canada Hot 100 (Billboard)	63
Global 200 (Billboard)	17
Greece International (IFPI)	52
India International (IMI)	2
Ireland (IRMA)	97
Japan Digital Singles (Oricon)	27
Japan Download Songs (Billboard Japan)	22
Japan Hot Overseas (Billboard Japan)	19
Lithuania (AGATA)	93
New Zealand Hot Singles (RMNZ)	2
Philippines (Philippines Hot 100)	61
Singapore (RIAS)	22
South Korea Download (Circle)	19
UK Singles (Official Charts)	66
UK Hip Hop/R&B (Official Charts)	16
US Billboard Hot 100	36
US Hot R&B/Hip-Hop Songs (Billboard)	7

== Release history ==
Release dates and formats for "Neva Play"
Region	Date	Format	Label	Ref.
Various	September 6, 2024	Digital download; streaming	Hot Girl; Warner	
Various	September 7, 2024	CD	Hot Girl; Warner	

== See also ==
- Anime and hip-hop
