= Right Place, Wrong Person =

- Digital and vinyl cover

Studio album by RM
- Released: May 24, 2024
- Length: 34:31
- Languages: English; Korean; Japanese
- Label: Big Hit
- Producers: Simbiatu Ajikawo; BJ Wnjn; Domi and JD Beck; Eun Hee-young; Gimjonny; Icecream Drum; Im Ju-seung; Jclef; JNKYRD; Qim Isle; Kim Han-joo; Kwak Jin-eon; Lee Tae-hoon; Marldn; Mokyo; Nancy Boy; No Identity; Oh Hyuk; Zior Park; Rad Museum; RM; San Yawn; Sojeso; Moses Sumney; Supreme Boi; Unsinkable

RM chronology
Indigo (2022)	Right Place, Wrong Person (2024)

Singles from Right Place, Wrong Person
- 1. "Come Back to Me" Released: May 10, 2024; 2. "Lost!" Released: May 24, 2024

Right Place, Wrong Person is the second studio album by South Korean rapper RM of BTS, released on May 24, 2024, through Big Hit Music. The album follows his first solo album, Indigo, released December 2022, and contains two singles "Come Back to Me" and "Lost!", the former peaked at number 24 on the Billboard Global 200 and the latter peaked at number 68 on the same chart. The album features appearances by Little Simz, Domi and JD Beck, and Moses Sumney.

== Background ==
In 2023, RM traveled to Spain in search of inspiration for his second solo album, feeling unfulfilled after the critical and commercial success of Indigo. In an interview with EFE, he reflected on his journey to rediscover his identity after a decade of navigating the demands of K-pop as a member of BTS. He also revealed that he would "not be taking on any projects in the near future" in preparation for his mandatory military service, which began on December 11, 2023.

== Promotion and release ==
On April 26, 2024, Big Hit Music announced the release of his second studio album which was slated to be released on May 24. The following day, the promotional schedule including the release of the track list, teasers, music videos has been revealed. The album consists of 11 songs that fall within the alternative genre. He participated in writing the lyrics for all 11 songs.

On May 24, while fulfilling his military obligations, RM released his second studio album Right Place, Wrong Person.

On September 4, it was announced that the documentary film RM: Right People, Wrong Place will be released through the "Open Cinema" section of the 29th Busan International Film Festival. It offers a glimpse into his introspective journey during the eight months leading up to his military enlistment, as well as a peek through the sessions for the album, including how he channeled his experiences and emotions.

On July 8, 2025, a vinyl version of the album was announced. It had a rolling release by countries and regions from August 8, 2025.

== Critical reception ==
Professional ratings
Review scores
Source	Rating
AllMusic	4.5/5 stars
NME	5/5 stars

Rhian Daly of NME called the album "a gorgeous, intriguing, artful record" and "nothing short of electric" with "discordant layers viscerally reflect[ing] the album's emotions of feeling out of place and its eventual message" that "rewards repeat and close listens, each track full of little details that elevate each go round". Maura Johnston of Rolling Stone described it as "psychedelia-tinged and soulful, its lyrics' intense self-interrogation balanced by music that feels like an invite to further explorations". Azrin Tan of Vogue Singapore wrote, "This album is utter proof of RM's evolution as a musician and artist... This is RM in his endless search for the sonic world that could have been, at least once upon a time. It's RM and Kim Namjoon both, just more curious about the many facets of himself that lie deep within."

David Crone of AllMusic praised the creative experimentation of the album, saying "This nonconformist backbone is not just the album's sound, but its entire ethos" and noted how "RM's lyrics gravitate between ideas of perception and discovery." Crone also wrote, "Right Place, Wrong Person is fundamentally a record of self-acceptance, but it's a kind of self-acceptance that's seen much less often -- punchy and upbeat and even broken, it's a reflection of a messy self-hood that never risks relying on vague, affirmative clichés. Of all the lessons he draws, Namjoon leaves us with one critical truth: much like the album itself, life is beautiful because of, not in spite of, its wonkiness." For Teen Vogue Jiye Kim wrote, "RM at the cusp of 30 has filled up both the visuals and music with a discordant energy in an ever-changing flow of genres and rhythms across a tight 35 minute, 11 track album... (this album) emphatically taps into the collective human fear of one's innate wrongness and the cyclic journey of rage, disappointment, exhaustion, and renewal" and declared, "Right Place, Wrong Person is absolutely Kim Namjoon in essence."

The album was recognized as one of the best albums of the first half of the year by Rolling Stone, Billboard, The Associated Press, and NME. Billboard wrote "RM simply refuses to acknowledge the existence of any such boundaries over these 34 minutes, with 11 songs that careen from hip-hop to jazz to punk to R&B to Fela Kuti-styled Afrobeats — while all still sounding like a coherent and natural artistic extension of one man's creative vision" and compared him to genreless artists like Tyler the Creator.

== Commercial performance ==
The album debuted at number two on the South Korean Circle Album Chart with over 585,000 copies sold of its two versions. It also debuted at number two on the Japanese Oricon Albums Chart with over 23,000 sales. In the United States, the album debuted at number one on the Billboard Top Rap Albums chart, as well as number five on the Billboard 200.

== Accolades ==
=== Listicles ===
Listicles
Publisher	Country	Year	Listicle	Placement	Ref.
AllMusic	USA	2024	Favourite Rap & Hip-hop Album	Included	
AP	USA	2024	The best albums of 2024 so far	Included	
Billboard	USA	2024	The 20 Best K-Pop Albums of 2024 (So Far): Staff Picks	1^{st}	
Billboard	USA	2024	The 25 Best K-Pop Albums of 2024: Staff Picks	1^{st}	
Billboard	Philippines	2024	The 50 Best Albums And EPs Of 2024 – Staff Picks	Included	
Creative Review	UK	2024	The best album art and design of the year 2024	Included	
Forbes	USA	2024	Most Acclaimed K-pop Album of 2024	Included	
Genius - Year End	USA	2024	The Genius Community’s 50 Best Albums of 2024	39^{th}	
Genius - Till Aug 2024	USA	2024	The Genius Community's 25 Best Albums of 2024	7^{th}	
The Guardian	UK	2024	Readers’ Favourite albums of 2024 so far	Included	
Hypebeast	Hong Kong	2024	The 10 Best Music Projects of 2024	Included	
Idology	South Korea	2025	Year-End 2024: 16 Albums of the Year	Included	
Hypebeast	Hong Kong	2024	The 10 Best Music Projects of 2024	Included	
Minuto Indie	Brazil	2024	20 best international albums of 2024	Included	
NME	UK	2024	The 50 Best Albums of 2024	16^{th}	
PopCrush	USA	2024	Best Pop Albums of 2024	Included	
Rolling Stone	USA	2024	The 100 Best Albums of 2024	88^{th}	
UOL SPLASH	Brazil	2024	The best of K-pop: check out the list of albums that stood out the most in 2024	Included	
Yardbarker	USA	2024	The 50 best albums of 2024	28^{th}	

== Track listing ==
Right Place, Wrong Person track listing
No.	Title	Writer(s)	Producer(s)	Length
1.	"Right People, Wrong Place"	JNKYRD; Kwak Jin-eon; Mokyo; RM; San Yawn; Unsinkable; Eun Hee-young	Mokyo; Kwak; Unsinkable; RM; Eun; Yawn; JNKYRD	1:57
2.	"Nuts"	BJ Wnjn; JNKYRD; Mokyo; Nancy Boy; RM; Yawn; Qim Isle; Lee Tae-hoon	Lee; Mokyo; Nancy Boy; Qim Isle; BJ Wnjn; RM; Yawn; JNKYRD	3:14
3.	"Out of Love"	Icecream Drum; JNKYRD; No Identity; RM; Yawn; Supreme Boi; Unsinkable; Zior Park; Im Ju-seung	Supreme Boi; No Identity; Unsinkable; Im; Icecream Drum; Park; RM; Yawn; JNKYRD	2:07
4.	"Domodachi" (featuring Little Simz)	BJ Wnjn; JNKYRD; Mokyo; Nancy Boy; RM; Yawn; Simbiatu Ajikawo; Qim Isle; Lee	Mokyo; Nancy Boy; BJ Wnjn; RM; JNKYRD; Qim Isle; Ajikawo; Yawn	3:04
5.	"? (Interlude)" (with Domi and JD Beck)	BJ Wnjn; Domi and JD Beck; Glowingdog; JNKYRD; Mokyo; RM; Yawn	Domi and JD Beck	1:53
6.	"Groin"	JNKYRD; Kim Han-joo; Mokyo; RM; Yawn	Mokyo; Kim H.; RM; Yawn; JNKYRD	3:10
7.	"Heaven"	JNKYRD; Rad Museum; RM; Yawn; Sojeso; Unsinkable	JNKYRD; Unsinkable; Sojeso; Rad Museum; RM; Yawn	3:14
8.	"Lost!"	Jclef; JNKYRD; Kim H.; Marldn; Nancy Boy; RM; Yawn; Unsinkable; Qim Isle	Jclef; Kim H.; Marldn; Nancy Boy; Unsinkable; Qim Isle; RM; Yawn; JNKYRD	3:53
9.	"Around the World in a Day" (featuring Moses Sumney)	Gimjonny; Jclef; JNKYRD; Sumney; No Identity; RM; Yawn; Qim Isle; Eun	Eun; Gimjonny; Qim Isle; No Identity; Jclef; RM; Sumney; Yawn; JNKYRD	4:17
10.	"ㅠㅠ (Credit Roll)"	JNKYRD; Kim H.; RM; Yawn; Qim Isle	Kim H.; Qim Isle; RM; Yawn; JNKYRD	1:14
11.	"Come Back to Me"	JNKYRD; Kuo; Oh Hyuk; RM; Yawn	Oh	6:28
Total length:				34:31

== Charts ==
=== Weekly charts ===
Weekly chart performance
Chart (2024)	Peak position
Australian Albums (ARIA)	50
Austrian Albums (Ö3 Austria)	7
Belgian Albums (Ultratop Flanders)	40
Belgian Albums (Ultratop Wallonia)	7
Canadian Albums (Billboard)	56
Croatian International Albums (HDU)	17
Dutch Albums (Album Top 100)	93
German Albums (Offizielle Top 100)	9
Hungarian Albums (MAHASZ)	31
Irish Albums (IRMA)	63
Italian Albums (FIMI)	49
Japanese Albums (Oricon)	2
Japanese Combined Albums (Oricon)	2
Japanese Hot Albums (Billboard Japan)	2
Lithuanian Albums (AGATA)	15
New Zealand Albums (RMNZ)	20
Polish Albums (ZPAV)	5
Portuguese Albums (AFP)	3
Scottish Albums (Official Charts)	11
South Korean Albums (Circle)	2
Spanish Albums (Promusicae)	19
Swedish Physical Albums (Sverigetopplistan)	14
Swiss Albums (Schweizer Hitparade)	7
UK Albums (Official Charts)	37
US Billboard 200	5
US Top Rap Albums (Billboard)	1
US Vinyl Albums (Billboard)	7

=== Monthly charts ===
Monthly chart performance
Chart (2024)	Position
Japanese Albums (Oricon)	11
South Korean Albums (Circle)	5

=== Year-end charts ===
Year-end chart performance
Chart (2024)	Position
South Korean Albums (Circle)	45

== Certifications ==
Certifications
Region	Certification	Certified units/sales
South Korea (KMCA)	2× Platinum	500,000^{^}
^{^} Shipments figures based on certification alone.
