= RM (mixtape) =

Mixtape by RM
- Released: March 20, 2015
- Recorded: 2014–2015
- Genre: Hip hop
- Length: 37:32
- Language: Korean
- Label: Big Hit Entertainment

RM chronology
RM (2015)	Mono (2018)

RM is the debut mixtape by South Korean rapper RM (then Rap Monster) of BTS. It was released on March 20, 2015, by Big Hit Entertainment on SoundCloud.

== Background and development ==
Prior to launching his career as the rapper RM of South Korean boy band BTS, RM began writing poetry in his 2nd year of elementary school, focusing on topics of despair, loneliness, and the relationship between the self and the world. At age 11, RM developed an interest in hip hop music and grew interested in lyricism following an introduction to American rapper Eminem by his school teacher. As a first year middle school student, RM began rapping in local amateur hip-hop circles and became active in the underground Korean hip-hop scene under the moniker "Runch Randa", releasing a number of tracks and collaborations with other underground rappers before entering Big Hit Entertainment to pursue a career in music as a member of a hip hop group similar to 1TYM in 2010. As the plans for the group transitioned to a more traditional Korean idol group, RM recalls he felt like he was living a "counterfeit life" but remained in the group as CEO Bang Si-hyuk promised RM he could make music he himself had written, not music others had written. RM trained under Big Hit Entertainment for three years alongside members J-Hope and Suga before making his debut as a member of BTS in 2013. In the initial years of his career in BTS, both he and fellow group member Suga faced criticism from the underground hip hop scene for "selling out" and becoming K-pop idols.

In an interview for Singles Magazine, RM expressed a desire to release a mixtape to establish himself and present a thesis on his self-identity. Between his commitments as a member of BTS, RM took advantage of his resting time to work on his mixtape. The entirety of his work on the mixtape took around four to five months. Developing RM musically on the base of hip hop, much of RM's inspiration for the lyrics came from his own "inner darkness, worries, greed" and the song "Just Do You" by India Arie.

== Music and lyrics ==
The final cut of RM comprises eleven tracks on SoundCloud.

In RM, RM responded to his critics, reflected on his insecurities and doubts, and revealed his belief in himself. The opening track "Voice" focused on telling the story of his past over a simple piano loop in the background. "Do You", with its monotonous beats, contained the core message of the mixtape advising listeners to lead an autonomous life free from society's standards. The following track "Awakening" delved into RM's internal conflict over his identity of "idol" versus "artist" before retorting his haters in the track "Monster" and demanding that his listeners discard their prejudice and bias in "Throw Away". In "Joke", RM showcased his rap techniques with stream of consciousness lyrics, while "God Rap" reflected RM's atheist worldview that only oneself controls one's life decisions and deals with its consequences, that having faith in yourself is the key. In "Life", RM presented an examination of life, death and solitude with calm, composed rapping leading into the track "Adrift" which contemplated the meaning of life and happiness. The final track "I Believe" concluded the mixtape with RM's trust in himself and his determination to continue forward.

== Release and promotion ==
On March 11, 2015, RM announced the release of his debut mixtape for March 17 through a post of the mixtape's cover art on BTS' blog page along with its theme of "You do you, I do I". In the lead up to the mixtape's release, a music video for the track "Awakening" was released on March 13. Delayed to improve its production, the mixtape was released on March 20, 2015, on SoundCloud and for free download via links on BTS' blog in conjunction with a music video for "Do You". On March 27, RM released a follow-up music video for "Joke". Aside from interviewing for magazines such as Hip Hop Playa and IZE, RM did not further promote the mixtape. It later ranked 48th on Spin's "50 Best Hip Hop Albums of 2015". The album reached No. 12 on Billboard's World Album chart in 2015.

== Track listing ==
All tracks are written by RM

No.	Title	Producer(s)	Length
1.	"Voice" (목소리)	Slow Rabbit	2:47
2.	"Do You"		3:01
3.	"Awakening" (각성 / 覺醒)		2:38
4.	"Monster"		3:44
5.	"Throw Away" (버려)		3:15
6.	"Joke" (농담)		3:18
7.	"God Rap"		3:34
8.	"Rush" (feat. Krizz Kaliko)	Pdogg	4:12
9.	"Life"		4:17
10.	"Adrift" (표류)		3:09
11.	"I Believe"	Slow Rabbit	3:42
Total length:			37:32

Sample credits

- "Do You" contains the original beat of "Aerosol Can" as performed by Major Lazer.
- "Awakening" contains the original beat of "The Alarm" as performed by Big K.R.I.T.
- "Monster" contains the original beat of "Grown Simba" as performed by J. Cole.
- "Throw Away" contains the original beat of "Hypest Hype" as performed by Chase & Status.
- "Joke" contains the original beat of "Oh My Darling Don't Cry" as performed by Run the Jewels.
- "God Rap" contains the original beat of "God's Gift" as performed by J. Cole.
- "Life" contains the original beat of "Life" as performed by J. Dilla.
- "Adrift" contains the original beat of "Lust 4 Life" as performed by Drake.

== Release history ==
Region	Date	Format	Label
Various	March 20, 2015	Streaming; digital download	Big Hit
