= Sexy Nukim =

Single by Balming Tiger featuring RM
- Language: Korean, English
- Released: September 1, 2022
- Recorded: 2022
- Genre: Hip hop
- Length: 3:49
- Label: Balming Tiger
- Songwriters: BJ Wnjn; Omega Sapien; Mudd the Student; RM
- Producers: BJ Wnjn; San Yawn; Leesuho; Unsinkable

Balming Tiger singles chronology
"Loop" (2021)	"Sexy Nukim" (2022)

RM singles chronology
"Bicycle" (2021)	"Sexy Nukim" (2022)	"Wild Flower" (2022)

Music video
- "Sexy Nukim" on YouTube

"Sexy Nukim" (Korean: 섹시느낌; RR: Seksi Neukkim; lit. 'Sexy Feeling'), is a song by the South Korean music collective Balming Tiger featuring RM of BTS. It was co-written by group members BJ Wnjn, Omega Sapien, and Mudd the Student, who appear on the track, and RM. Groupmate San Yawn produced the track alongside BJ Wnjn. Released as a digital single on September 1, 2022, the song is the group's first new music since 2021's "Loop", and their first to feature another artist.

== Background and release ==
Balming Tiger last released new music as a group in 2021, with the singles "Just Fun!" and "Loop". They focused on individual activities after that, before deciding on a group comeback for 2022. Members BJ Wnjn and Leesuho began working on "Sexy Nukim" a year prior to its release. Member Unsinkable also worked on the song's arrangement, marking the first time in the group's history that all of their producers had participated in the creation of the same track. The single was released globally on September 1, 2022.

Per a DIY Mag interview with the group, published the day of the single's release, the song's message is that "the artist's 'sexiness' is not something that can be bought with money". It "contains a mind set that wants to be 'one and only' with their unique personality, not just pursuing material things." The group's intent was to "show the world 'Asian Sexy' and 'Asian Cool'" through the song.

== Music video ==
The music video was directed by Japanese director Pennacky, who worked with Balming Tiger on previous projects.

The video portrays Bj Wnjn as a doctor overseeing Omega Sapien and Mudd the Student receiving electroshock therapy at a medical facility. After each session, various scenes from inside their minds are shown as they rap their individual verses, including them at an asylum and a sauna surrounded by a large group of people—these are actually other members of the Balming Tiger collective—dressed in white. RM appears next, as his verse begins, at an old mechanical repair shop filled with pedestal fans, owned by an elderly man. He rides over a toy Ferrari on the ground with his bicycle—a reference to some of his lyrics—and raps the rest of his verse inside the store. San Yawn sporadically appears throughout the video, including during RM's verse. The visual returns to the Balming Tiger members at the sauna then sitting in a pool of water, surrounded by the same group of people from the beginning. It closes out with a rotating shot that alternates between the group of people standing outdoors, surrounding Omega Sapien and Mudd the Student—the latter holds a matching balloon—who are now both dressed in red, and RM standing amid the fans at the repair shop also holding a red balloon.

NME described the video as "eclectic", while PopSugar called it "psychedelic" and listed it as one of the sexiest videos of the year "for how refreshingly experimental it is".

A performance version of the music video, featuring the Balming Tiger members and a group of backup dancers—RM does not appear in the video—was released a week later.

== Live performances ==
Balming Tiger and RM performed the song together for the first time at a charity event hosted by W Korea on October 28, 2022, in support of its Love Your W breast cancer awareness campaign. They also incorporated "synchronised dance moves" (seen in the performance version of the music video) into the performance during the chorus. RM performed an abridged version of the song during a commemorative music event for his debut solo album Indigo (2022) held at Rolling Hall in Seoul on December 5.

== Accolades ==
NME included the track on its list of the "25 best K-pop songs of 2022", at number 23, with writer Carmen Chin calling it "a stroke of brilliance in an already remarkable oeuvre". It was nominated for and won Collaboration of the Year and Music Video of the Year at the 2023 Korean Hip-hop Awards.

== Personnel ==
Adapted from Melon Music. Dolby Atmos mixing by SOUND360 Studio.

- Chris Athens – mastering (at Chris Athens Masters)
  - Harrison Holmes – assistant
- Bj wnjn – production, songwriting, arrangement
- Christopher Botta – mixing (at Fer Sound)
- Jung-hoon Choi – immersive mixing
- Hyunjae – guitar
- JNKYRD – sound supervision
- Haneul Lee – immersive mixing
- Leesuho – production
- Mudd the Student – songwriting
- Omega Sapien – songwriting
- Unsinkable – production, arrangement
- RM – songwriting
- San Yawn – creative direction, production, arrangement

== Charts ==
Weekly chart performance for "Sexy Nukim"
Chart (2022)	Peak position
New Zealand Hot Singles (RMNZ)	33
South Korea Download (Circle)	23
UK Singles Sales (OCC)	60
US Rap Digital Song Sales (Billboard)	4
US World Digital Song Sales (Billboard)	1

== Release history ==
Region	Date	Format	Label	Ref.
Various	September 1, 2022	Digital download; streaming	Balming Tiger	
