= Balming Tiger =

South Korean musical collective

- Origin: Seoul, South Korea
- Years active: 2018–present
- Labels: YG Plus, AWAL, Amuse, CAM WITH US
- Members: San Yawn; Abyss; Omega Sapien; Jan'Qui; sogumm; bj wnjn; Unsinkable; Mudd the student; Henson Hwang; Leesuho; Hong Chanhee
- Past members: Byung-Un; No Identity
- Website: balmingtiger.com

Balming Tiger is an alternative K-pop music collective and band formed in Seoul, South Korea, in 2018. The group is composed of rappers, singer-songwriters, producers, video directors, creative directors, visual artists, A&Rs, and editors. The founding members were San Yawn, Abyss, No Identity, and Byung Un. After the departure of No Identity and Byung Un, the group expanded its creative spectrum with the addition of new members in the following order: Jan'Qui, Unsinkable, sogumm, Omega Sapien, Henson Hwang, BJ Wnjn, Mudd the student, Leesuho, and Hong Chanhee.

== Members ==
=== Balming Tiger members ===
- San Yawn – Producer, Creative director (2017–present)
- Abyss – A&R, DJ, co-founder (2017–present)
- Jan'Qui – video director (2018–present)
- Unsinkable – producer, DJ (2018–present)
- sogumm – singer-songwriter, vocalist (2018–present)
- Omega Sapien – rapper (2018–present)
- Henson Hwang – marketing manager, editor (2018–present)
- bj wnjn – singer-songwriter, producer (2019–present)
- Mudd the student – singer-songwriter, producer (2019–present)
- Leesuho – video director, producer (2021–present)
- Hong Chanhee – visual director (2021–present)

=== Past members ===
- Byung-Un – rapper (2017–2019)
- No Identity – producer (2017–2019)

=== Band members ===
- Kim Hanjoo – music director, guitar and keys (2024–present)
- Mulsoo – band master, bass (2024–present)
- Schepes – keys (2024–present)
- Jin Sil – guitar (2024–present)
- Iljun Jeon – drums (2024–present)
- Leesuho – FX (2024–present)

== History ==
2017–2018: 虎媄304 (Homie304) While San Yawn, Abyss, and No Identity, were preparing to launch an underground electronic music crew, they felt the need to bring in a standout main performer to draw attention. By chance, San Yawn was introduced to Byung Un through a fellow producer, leading to the formation of Balming Tiger. Their first mixtape, 虎媄304 (Homie304), was completed at their studio, located in an officetel(studio apartment with office space) that housed the Homie Art Shop in Hongdae. The mixtape was released on January 24, 2018, and quickly gained attention within South Korea’s underground music scene.

The music video for the mixtape’s title track, “CHEF LEE” marked the recruitment of video director Jan' Qui. In addition to lead vocalist Byung Un, the mixtape also featured Kim Ximya and Sukkary. Balming Tiger’s debut mixtape Homie304 garnered attention for its eccentric charm— embracing a B-movie aesthetic, unpredictable and whimsical lyrics, high-quality yet unconventional production full of variations, and Byung Un’s rap skills.

In their early days, Balming Tiger gained significant attention with the music video for their digital single “I'm Sick,” a collaboration with Dingo Freestyle filmed in a documentary format. However, shortly after this rise in visibility, their main performer Byung Un signed with HIGHLINE and officially left the crew in December 2018. Around the same time, producer No Identity, who had been responsible for producing the entire Homie304 mixtape, also departed the crew due to personal reasons. During the release party for “I’m Sick,” Balming Tiger invited Unsinkable as a guest DJ. Following the event, they officially welcomed him as a producer.

Around this time, Omega Sapien, who was preparing to launch his music career in Japan, came across the Homie304 mixtape online. Intrigued by the project, he reached out to Balming Tiger and, after meeting the crew in Korea, joined the team on the spot. Through Balming Tiger, he released his pre-recorded track “Rich & Clear” along with a music video directed by his friend Pennacky. Around the same period, sogumm, who had been active on SoundCloud, was also recruited into the crew, further expanding Balming Tiger's creative roster.

2019–2020: The Tiny Tour On February 8, 2019, to mark the first anniversary of their debut mixtape 虎媄:304, Balming Tiger released an LP version of the project. This edition included a bonus track — “ONCEAGAIN Remix” — featuring prominent Korean rappers Woo Won-jae, Verbal Jint, and Nucksal. Around the same time, Henson, who was actively working in various media outlets, joined Balming Tiger as the group’s marketing manager and editor, contributing to both their promotional strategies and creative direction.

Following this, Balming Tiger released the single “Armadillo”, marking the transition of leadership from Byung Un to Omega Sapien as the crew’s new frontman. The track, accompanied by a music video directed by Pennacky, showcased the distinct visual flair of the director along with stellar rap performances from both Byung Un and Omega Sapien. Coupled with strong production, the release became a pivotal moment in building the group’s public recognition.

In June, Balming Tiger participated as a judge for the VANS’ campaign, an initiative aimed at discovering emerging talent. During the audition process, they discovered Mudd the Student, who despite not placing in the finals, impressed the crew enough that they reached out independently and recruited him. That same month, Omega Sapien released a solo single titled “POP THE TAG”, produced by Leesuho. The track combined Leesuho’s experimental sound with Omega Sapien’s distinctive rap style, with additional arrangement contributions by No Identity.

In September, Balming Tiger released their tour documentary series titled The Great Legacy, offering a glimpse into the crew’s free-spirited and down-to-earth moments as they traveled across the globe.

In October, sogumm released her first studio album Sobrightttttttt, a collection of tracks originally uploaded to SoundCloud and co-created with producer bj wnjn. Entirely produced by bj wnjn, the album highlighted sogumm’s dreamlike and idiosyncratic style, earning critical acclaim and a nomination for Best R&B Album at the Korean Music Awards.

bj wnjn, who had maintained a creative relationship with Balming Tiger since 2018, was formally recruited as a crew member around the time of sogumm’s album release.

Heading into 2020, Balming Tiger had planned to expand their international presence through a tour titled The Tiny Tour, but all dates were cancelled due to the COVID-19 pandemic. Instead, the crew shifted their focus to creating high-quality content, including an online concert filmed along the Han River and a collaborative Naver Now live performance with Hyukoh.

In January, Balming Tiger released the single “Kolo Kolo,” primarily produced by Unsinkable. The music video, directed by Pennacky, was inspired by the strict discipline of Japanese Spartan-style schools. This track marked the official debut of bj wnjn as both a producer and vocalist within the crew.

In September, Balming Tiger performed alongside Flume, Charli XCX, and the late SOPHIE during the online afterparty for A. G. Cook’s 7G release, showcasing their growing presence in the global experimental pop scene.

Around the same time, Omega Sapien released his debut studio album Garlic, working with producers such as Unsinkable, Leesuho, SUMIN, Kwangjae Jeon, NET GALA, and Bumjin to craft a fresh and boundary-pushing sound. The album's cover art was created by renowned illustrator Shintaro Kago, further emphasizing the album’s surreal and unconventional aesthetic.

In February 2021, Balming Tiger released the single “JUST FUN! / LOOP?” and filmed their first music video with all performers participating. This song is the first track where sogumm, Omega Sapien, and bj wnjn equally participated as performers, and it well captures a groovy and funky feeling.

In May, Omega Sapien and producer Baauer released a 6-track EP titled “Wuga.” Among the tracks, “Plum,” featuring Sega Bodega, was included in the global MacBook Air advertisement revealed at Apple WWDC22 in 2022, and Balming Tiger’s group track “Kolo Kolo” was also included in an iPhone advertisement. Another track “Wrecker” featured Vernon from SEVENTEEN.

Video director and producer Leesuho, who had maintained a close relationship with Balming Tiger, was officially recruited.

Mudd The Student released the pre-release track of his first EP, ‘Off Road Jam,’ and the music video, filmed in a fake documentary style, was directed by current member Hong Chanhee, and featured appearances by Omega Sapien, San Yawn, and others. The EP ‘Field Trip’ was entirely produced by Mud The Student and received praise as an EP album reflecting his pure and unique personality.

On October 21, Leesuho released his first studio album, ‘Monika.’ Omega Sapien, So!YoON!, Jang Kiha, Kim Ximya, Lil Cherry, Simo, sogumm, Kim Hanjoo, and Kim Doeon participated as producers or vocal features. This album was nominated for Best Electronic Album at the 2022 Korean Music Awards.

Additionally, Hong Chanhee, who showed potential in various fields including design, photography, and video, was recruited to the team.

In November, they released ‘The G.O.A.T’ series, which depicts the creative motivations of Asian artists. This animation was produced by Henson, San Yawn, and Abyss, collaborating with various animators and narrators with unique styles. It includes episodes featuring Yayoi Kusama, Lee Bul, Koo Myojin, Apichatpong Weerasethakul, Kim Chang-ryeol, and Wang Shu. Starting with a track by Mudd the Student, they released the ‘Tiger Express’ series, content capturing the members’ live performances, produced in collaboration with director Bang Jae-yeop.

In February 2022, Omega Sapien released the remix album of his first studio album titled Garlic and the Mugwort: The Genesis. Remixers such as JNKYRD, Machine Girl, Salamanda, Zut Zut, DJ Paypal, foodman, and Y2K92 participated, attempting to expand the original album’s worldview. At SXSW, the largest conference in North America held in Texas, they held the first-ever solo showcase by a Korean artist collective and invited Asian artists to create a mini-festival within the festival (Balming Tiger x Jaded Present ‘Tiger Den’). Omega Sapien became the first Asian artist to receive the ‘Grulke Prize,’ awarded to the best performance artist at SXSW.

On September 1, 2022, the single ‘Sexy Feeling’ featuring BTS’s RM was released along with its music video. Thanks to RM’s feature, the song quickly gained attention by topping the Billboard World Digital Song Sales chart, Billboard Hot Trending Songs chart, and reaching number one on iTunes in 50 countries. The song carries a message that true individuality and sexiness come from oneself, not from others’ standards. The music video was directed by Pennacky, and there is also a reaction video featuring many artists including BTS’s j-hope, Milli, Ohhyuk, and Zion.T.

In December 2022, the remix album ‘Monika Remix’ of Leesuho’s ‘Monika’ was released. Kim Doo-an, NET GALA, and cjb95 participated as remixers.

In January 2023, the single ‘Trust Yourself’ was released. To commemorate the release, they produced their own variety show and uploaded it to their YouTube channel. There are a total of four episodes featuring Balming Tiger, singer Kim Jang-hoon, comedian group Psik University, and Shin Woo Seok, the CEO of the advertising production company Dolphin Kidnapper. The content is simple and comedic, showing them visiting these guests to ask how they trusted themselves and succeeded, either learning methods or sharing stories.

In April, they released the single ‘SOS’, which experiments with psychedelic rock sounds, along with a music video filmed in Hong Kong. The music video was directed by Jan’ Qui and actively uses clichés from Hong Kong movies.

The single ‘Kamehameha’ was released. The music video was directed by Hong Chanhee, with cinematography by Pennacky. The song’s title is borrowed from the famous chant in Dragon Ball, and it was mainly produced by bj wnjn. It expresses the feeling of being drunk through unique melodies and sounds.

In October, the group’s first studio album ‘January Never Dies’ was released along with the music video for the track ‘Moving Forward’. JND freely combines various genres including hip-hop, electronic music, rock, and psychedelic sounds. Before the album release, four teaser videos created by video director rafhoo were revealed.

A short film titled ‘Moving For Word’, inspired by the song Moving Forward, premiered in Korea on December 13 through CGV theaters. The film was planned and directed by Pennacky and was shot in Japan in the summer of 2023. Currently, it can only be viewed as part of the physical CD package of January Never Dies.

2024: The Greatest Hits To celebrate the new year, they appeared on KBS’s long-running music program ‘Open Concert’, performing ‘Moving Forward’ and ‘Buriburi + Pigeon and Plastic’. Their unexpected appearance on a show usually featuring veteran singers attracted considerable attention.

Following the release of their studio album, music videos for the tracks ‘Buriburi’ and ‘UP!’ were released sequentially. ‘Buriburi’ was directed by member Jan’ Qui and was filmed in one take in Thailand. The video gained much interest due to its unique effects and DIY-style filming.

‘UP!’ was directed by member Leesuho and is notable for starring actor Goo Kyo-hwan. It is known as the first Balming Tiger music video to feature a lead actor who is not a member of the group.

At the proposal of the Paik Nam June Art Center, to commemorate the 40th anniversary of Paik Nam June’s worldwide live performance ‘Good Morning Mr. Orwell’, a work titled ‘SARANGHAEYO ART LIVE’ was co-produced with artist Ryu Seongsil and exhibited at the Paik Nam June Art Center for one year until 2025. This video consists of four parts: contemporary art curator Smith, a Harvard graduate; the alternative K-pop group Balming Tiger; a sermon video from the late Cherry Yang; and other footage. After the exhibition ended, the video was uploaded to Balming Tiger’s YouTube channel.

They released the ‘Greatest Hits’ EP album containing five tracks and unveiled the music video for ‘Big Butt.’ The music video, inspired by the Taiwanese drama ‘Meteor Garden’ and the F4 group from it, was directed by Jan’ Qui. In November, they held their first solo concert in Korea under the concept name ‘Balming Tiger World Expo 2024.’ Kim Hanjoo from Silica Gel participated as the bandmaster, leading a band set consisting of guitarist Jinsill, keyboardist schpes, drummer Jeon Iljun, bassist Mulsoo, and playback (and FX) by Leesuho. The concert took place over two days at Nodeul Island, a performance venue on the Han River in Seoul. In December, at the Wonderlivet Festival, they presented a collaborative stage of ‘Buriburi + Pigeon and Plastic’ with the Japanese band Atarashii Gakko.

2025: The music video for "Cunning City," a track from the Greatest Hits EP, was released. It was filmed at Mount Bromo in Malang, Indonesia, with director Bang Jaeyeob.

They also released the music video for "Spirit Chaebol," directed by Song Kiho of Azikajin Magic World. The video was themed around a children’s TV program.

In February, they performed the theme song "Wash Away" for the NHK Japanese drama Tokyo Salad Bowl. Following the song's release, they carried out promotional activities in Japan for about a month. Thanks to its strong reception, the song reached No. 1 on the charts of J-Wave, the largest radio station in the Kanto region of Japan.

In September, the song "Wash Away" was featured on the official soundtrack for Konami's football simulation video game, EFootball 2026.

On May 27, Balming Tiger participated in Korean singer IU’s album Kkotgalpi 3, taking on both featuring and production roles for a remake of Shin Joong-hyun’s classic song “Mi-in (The Beauty).” Member Leesuho directed the music video, which featured appearances by Cha Eun-woo and IU. On June 20, they released the single ‘Narani Narani’ along with its music video, featuring Japanese group Atarashii Gakko no Leaders. Both teams appeared in the video, which was directed by Pennacky. The concept focused on blending psychedelic sounds with cultural commonalities between Korea and Japan, such as traditional folk music, trot, and enka.

They held their second solo concert in Seoul, titled ‘Pigeon and Plastic’. Silica Gel’s Kim Hanjoo participated as the music director, while renowned art director Ryu Seong-hee took on the role of stage art director. This marked Ryu Seong-hee’s first time designing art for a live performance, and she even created custom wallpaper patterns specifically for the concert's stage design.

The concert was structured with alternating VCR segments and live performances, woven together to tell a cohesive story. In the VCRs, the roles of Balming Tiger performers—bj wnjn, sogumm, Omega Sapian, and Mudd—were portrayed by actors Park Jung-min, Shim Eun-kyung, Lee Jung-hyun, and Kim Ki-chun, respectively. The role of the director in the VCRs was played by Baek Hyun-jin, with Silica Gel’s Choi Woong-hee participating as assistant director. The overall planning, directing, VCR production, and filming of the solo concert were all handled by Balming Tiger members San Yawn and Jan’Qui. This concert stood out for its creativity and presented a unique format that offered audiences a distinctly fresh and entertaining experience.

In September, a collaborative single with Yaeji was released. One track was released through Balming Tiger’s label, and the other through Yaeji’s label.

Balming Tiger released their second studio album <Gongbu> on May 19, 2026. Where previous albums had centered on each member's individual identity, <Gongbu> brings the entire group's shared goals and sensibilities together under a single unified concept.

The album's central narrative follows a fictional character named Park Min, who conducts experiments on dreams and the unconscious alongside a cast of subjects - played by the members themselves - at a research facility called Gongbu Korea. This story unfolds across three narrative films appended to the music videos for "Home," "Keep On," and "Oui," and carries through the album's visual identity into the stage design and merchandise of the <Gongbu> concert, held in Seoul on June 6 and 7.

Unlike <Pigeons and Plastic>, which leaned heavily on elaborate stage art and bold visuals, the concert took a more musically focused approach - featuring new arrangements and an expanded live session, resulting in a cohesive, finely balanced show that concluded to great success.

== Discography ==
Album

- Balming Tiger vol.1 : '虎媄304’ (2018) (Mixtape)
- January Never Dies (2023)
- Gongbu (2026)

Single

- Balming Tiger - ONCEAGAIN (feat. Kim Ximya) (2018)
- Balming Tiger - I'M SICK (2018)
- Balming Tiger - ONCEAGAIN Remix (feat. Byung Un Woo Won Jae, Nucksal, Verbal Jint) (2018)
- Omega Sapien - Rich & Clear (2018)
- Omega Sapien, Big Marvel - Chickenman (2018)
- Balming Tiger - Armadillo (feat. Omega Sapien, Byung Un) (2019)
- Kid Fei - G H O S T S T A R (2019)
- Omega Sapien - POP THE TAG (2019)
- Balming Tiger - Kolo Kolo (Feat. Omega Sapien, wnjn)(Prod. Unsinkable) (2020)
- Omega Sapien - Serenade for Mrs.Jeon (2020)
- Omega Sapien - Ah! Ego (2020)
- Balming Tiger - JUST FUN! (2021)
- Balming Tiger - LOOP? (2021)
- Omega Sapien & Lil Cherry - Chromeheartsring (2021)
- Mudd the student - Off Road Jam (2021)
- 이수호 - Lights (Feat. Kim Hanjoo) (2021)
- 이수호 - Echo (Feat. Omega Sapien) (2021)
- Mudd the student - 사랑은 유사과학 (Feat. Chang Kiha) (2022)
- Balming Tiger - Sexy Nukim (feat. RM of BTS) (2022)
- Balming Tiger - Trust Yourself (2023)
- Balming Tiger - SOS (2023)
- Balming Tiger - Kamehameha (2023)
- Balming Tiger - Wash Away (2025) (NHK 드라마 <Tokyo Salad Bowl> OST)
- Balmimg Tiger - Narani Narani (feat. Atarashii Gakko!) (2025)
- Balming Tiger x Hosono Haruomi - Nettaiya (2025)
- Balming Tiger - 집으로 (Home) (2026)
- Balming Tiger - 고진감래 (Gojingamrae) (2026)

Title	Year	Peak chart positions			Album
Title	Year	JPN Over.	NZ Hot	US Dig.	Album
"I'm Sick"	2018	—	—	—	Non-album singles
"Armadillo"	2019	—	—	—	Non-album singles
"Kolo Kolo"	2020	—	—	—	Non-album singles
"Just Fun!"	2021	—	—	—	Non-album singles
"Loop?"	2021	—	—	—	Non-album singles
"Sexy Nukim" (섹시느낌) (featuring RM of BTS)	2022	—	33	30	Non-album singles
"Wo Ai Ni" (with Yaeji)	2025	12	—	—	Non-album singles

== Awards and nominations ==
Name of the award ceremony, year presented, nominee(s) of the award, award category, and the result of the nomination
Award ceremony	Year	Category	Nominee(s)/work(s)	Result	Ref.
Berlin Music Video Awards	2020	Most Trashy	"Kolo Kolo"	Nominated	
European Festival Awards	2024	Newcomer of the Year	Balming Tiger	Won	
Korean Hip-hop Awards	2019	Music Video of the Year	"I'm Sick"	Nominated	
Korean Hip-hop Awards	2020	Music Video of the Year	"Armadillo"	Won	
Korean Hip-hop Awards	2023	Collaboration of the Year	"Sexy Nukim" (with RM)	Won	
Korean Hip-hop Awards	2023	Music Video of the Year	"Sexy Nukim" (with RM)	Won	
Music Awards Japan	2026	Best Cover Artwork	"Side by Side" (Feat. Atarashii Gakko!)	Nominated	
Music Awards Japan	2026	Best Cross-Border Collaboration Song	"Side by Side" (Feat. Atarashii Gakko!)	Nominated	
SXSW Grulke Prize	2023	Developing Non-U.S. Act	Balming Tiger	Won	
Whats Good Awards	2022	Asian Flow	Balming Tiger	Won	
