= Wild Flower (RM song) =

Single by RM featuring Youjeen

from the album Indigo
- Language: Korean; English
- Released: December 2, 2022
- Length: 4:33
- Label: Big Hit
- Songwriters: RM; Docskim
- Producer: Docskim

RM singles chronology
"Sexy Nukim" (2022)	"Wild Flower" (2022)	"Smoke Sprite" (2023)

Youjeen singles chronology
"왜 그랬어 (feat. 조유진)" (2012)	"Wild Flower" (2022)

Music video
- "Wild Flower" on YouTube

"Wild Flower" (Korean: 들꽃놀이; RR: Deulkkonnori) is a song by South Korean rapper RM of BTS featuring Youjeen of Cherry Filter. It was released on December 2, 2022, as the title track from his debut studio album Indigo (2022).

The music video was filmed on Mount Hwangmae in Hapcheon County, South Gyeongsang.

== Charts ==
=== Weekly charts ===
Weekly chart performance
Chart (2022)	Peak position
Canada (Canadian Hot 100)	93
Global 200 (Billboard)	35
Malaysia (Malaysia Songs)	9
New Zealand Hot Singles (RMNZ)	9
Singapore (Billboard)	14
South Korea (Circle)	49
South Korea (K-pop Hot 100)	33
Vietnam (Vietnam Hot 100)	2
US Billboard Hot 100	83

=== Monthly charts ===
Monthly chart performance
Chart (2022)	Peak position
South Korea (Circle)	71

=== Year-end charts ===
Annual chart rankings
Chart (2022)	Rank
US Digital Song Sales (Billboard)	66
