= Bella Freud =

British fashion designer (born 1961)

- Born: Bella Freud; 17 April 1961 (age 65); London, England
- Occupation: Fashion designer
- Spouse: James Fox (m. 2001; sep. 2017)
- Children: 1
- Parent(s): Lucian Freud; Bernardine Coverley
- Relatives: Freud family

Isobel Lucia Freud (born 17 April 1961), is a London-based fashion designer. Her work is known for its playful and often humorous use of language. She is the daughter of the painter Lucian Freud and great-granddaughter of Sigmund Freud, the founder of psychoanalysis. She is also famous for her podcast, Fashion Neurosis.

== Life and career ==
Freud was born in London, England. She is the daughter of Bernardine Coverley and artist Lucian Freud, and the great-granddaughter of the inventor of psychoanalysis, Sigmund Freud. Her maternal grandparents were Roman Catholics of Irish descent, but her mother was no longer observant, while her father's family were Jewish atheists. She identifies as Jewish.

Her sister is Esther Freud, who wrote the memoir of their hippie childhood in Morocco, Hideous Kinky.

Freud was married to journalist James Fox in 2001. They have a son. The couple separated in 2017.

In October of 2024, Freud launched her fashion podcast Fashion Neurosis, beginning with an episode with American fashion designer Rick Owens.

== See also ==
- Freud family
