= Lost! (RM song) =

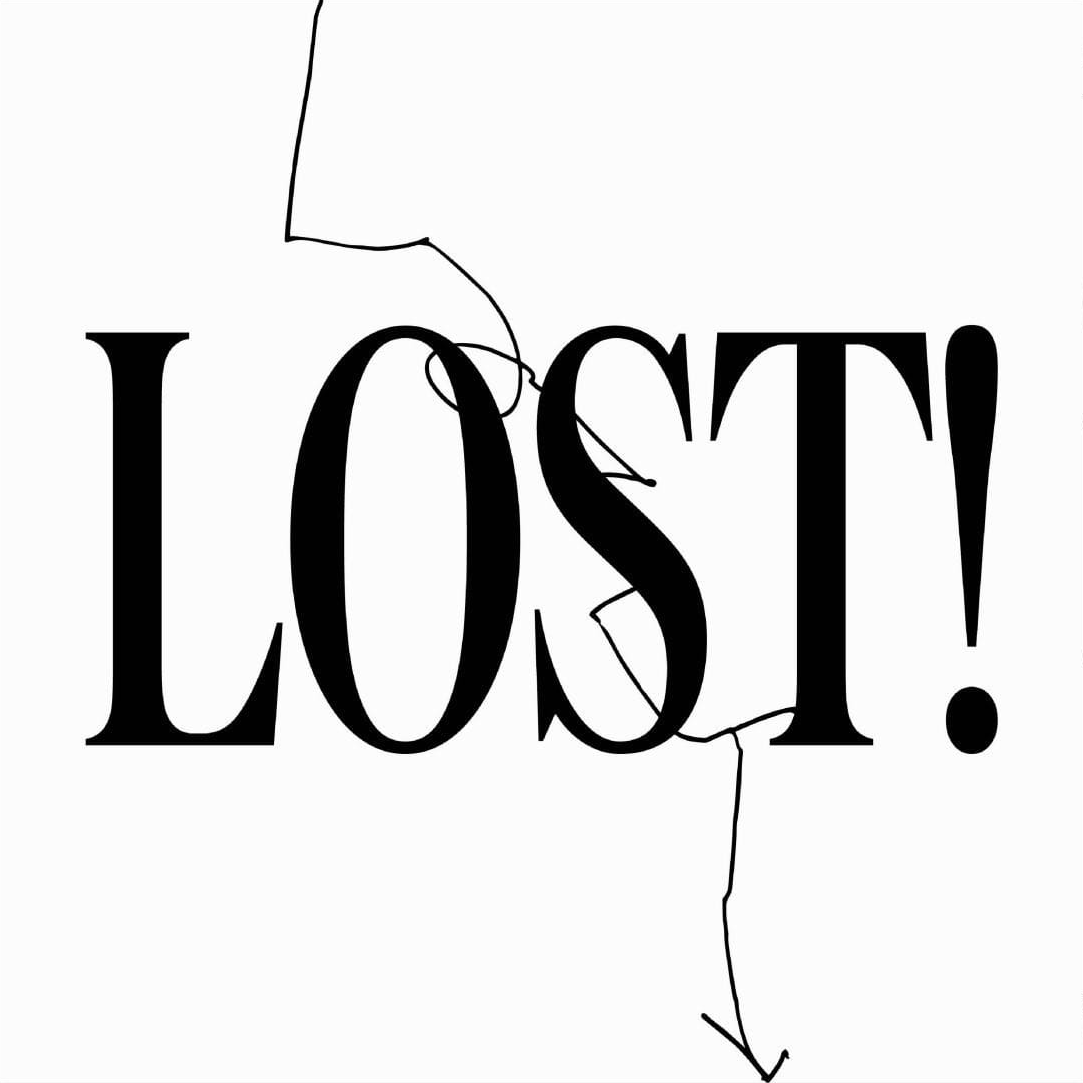

Single by RM

from the album Right Place, Wrong Person
- Released: May 24, 2024
- Length: 3:53
- Label: Big Hit
- Songwriters: Jclef; JNKYRD; Kim H.; Marldn; Nancy Boy; RM; San Yawn; Unsinkable; Kim A.
- Producers: Jclef; JNKYRD; Kim H.; Marldn; Nancy boy; RM; San Yawn; Unsinkable; Kim A.

RM singles chronology
"Come Back to Me" (2024)	"Lost!" (2024)	"Neva Play" (2024)

Music video
- "Lost!" on YouTube

"Lost!" (stylized in all caps) is a song by South Korean rapper RM of BTS from his second studio album Right Place, Wrong Person (2024). It was released as the album's second single on May 24, 2024, through Big Hit Music. A music video directed by Aube Perrie was released simultaneously with the single's release. The critically acclaimed music video went on to win multiple industry and commercial awards including UK Music Video Awards.

== Background and writing ==
RM was left unfulfilled after Indigo (2022) despite its critical acclaim and commercial success. Instead, he spent more than a year feeling adrift and even postponed his mandatory military enlistment to delve deeper into music, feelings and sentiment, which later became the album Right Place, Wrong Person (2024). For RM, the months, prior to making of the album, were dynamic in terms of highs and lows and there was a sense of near mania, which lead to the single "Lost!".

The song addresses themes of being lost and represents the album's theme. Over fifteen months, RM distanced himself from the group to address his identity outside of BTS. This experience is the subject of "Lost!", which is the album’s title track.

== Music and lyrics ==
"Lost!" is a hip-hop and rap track that runs for 3 minutes and 53 seconds, with the chorus containing funky beats and a rapid synth.

The lyrics have a poetic feel to it. In the intro, RM consistently asks, "How'd you get lost?" which sets the tone of the song. As the track progresses, RM finds himself in different situations with different people, but the feeling of being lost and lonely remains. The song overlaps glee with sorrow, with a last-minute grab at a “silver cloud,” and a call out to “dump it on the ground / pick it up, throw it in the trunk.”

It is a sonically upbeat song, yet a closer listen to the lyrics reveals the melancholic undercurrent which RM has hinted at from the start. The song makes one question whether he wants a keepsake of his gleeful wanderings or whether he is locking it up in acknowledgement of the temptation to let loose again.

== Music video ==
The music video is directed by UK based Aube Perrie and is 5 minutes and 24 seconds in length. Depicted in a talk show set-up, in the video RM tries to navigate himself as he’s trapped in maze-like building with various floors and rooms. Eventually, he finds an air-duct that puts him on set of a bizarre talk show, where he’s unexpectedly the musical guest.

It combines VFX, physical set builds and animated details, creating a varied aesthetic that changes across sequences. The combinations have an uncanny effect, transforming familiar environments into otherworldly, surreal realms. Many of the shots are framed from an elevated camera angle, giving the audience an all-seeing perspective while RM and the other characters appear as miniature figures trapped inside a fictional universe.

The music video won multiple awards from coveted awarding entities, including UK Music Video Awards, Creative Review Awards and Shark Awards, for both craft and commercial success.

== Festival screenings ==
Festival	Section	Screening Dates	Notes	Ref
Cannes Lions	New Creators’ Showcase	June 20, 2024	Music Video screening	
SXSW London	Music Video Showcase	June 5, 2025	Music Video screening	

== Awards and nominations ==
List of awards and nominations
Award ceremony	Year	Category	Result	Ref.
1.4 Awards	2025	Music Video - Flying High	Gold	
AICP Awards	2025	Music Video	Shortlisted	
AICP Awards	2025	Cinematography	Shortlisted	
Berlin Commercial Awards	2024	Cinematography	Won	
Berlin Music Video Awards	2025	Best Concept	2nd Place	
British Arrows	2025	Best Music Video	Bronze	
Ciclope Awards	2024	Direction	Gold	
Ciclope Awards	2024	Production design	Gold	
Ciclope Awards	2024	Cinematography	Bronze	
Ciclope Awards	2024	Color grading	Bronze	
Creative Circle	2025	Visual Effects	Gold	
Creative Circle	2025	Music Video - Promo Film : Single	Silver	
Creative Review Annual Awards	2025	Music Video - Entertainment	Grand Prix	
D&AD Awards	2025	Music Videos - Art Direction	Won	
D&AD Awards	2025	Production Design - Long Form	Won	
D&AD Awards	2025	Cinematography - Long Form	Won	
D&AD Awards	2025	Direction - Long Form	Shortlisted	
MAMA Awards	2024	Best Hip Hop & Rap Music	Nominated	
MAMA Awards	2024	Song of the Year	Longlisted	
Shark Awards	2025	Best Music Video - International	Won	
Shark Awards	2025	Best R&B / Soul Video - International	Won	
Shots Awards EMEA	2024	Music Video of the Year	Nominated	
SXSW Awards	2024	Music Video Competition	Nominated	
UK Music Video Awards	2024	Best Alternative Video – International	Won	
UK Music Video Awards	2024	Best Production Design in a Video	Won	

== Charts ==
Weekly chart performance
Chart (2024)	Peak position
Global 200 (Billboard)	68
India International Singles (IMI)	2
New Zealand Hot Singles (RMNZ)	25
South Korea (Circle)	127
US Digital Song Sales (Billboard)	5
