= Come Back to Me (RM song) =

Single by RM

from the album Right Place, Wrong Person
- Released: May 10, 2024
- Length: 6:28
- Label: Big Hit
- Songwriters: JNKYRD; Kuo; Oh Hyuk; RM; San Yawn
- Producer: Oh Hyuk

RM singles chronology
"Don't Ever Say Love Me" (2023)	"Come Back to Me" (2024)	"Lost!" (2024)

Music video
- "Come Back to Me" on YouTube

"Come Back to Me" (stylized in sentence case)is a song by South Korean rapper RM of BTS from his second studio album Right Place, Wrong Person. It was released as the album's lead single on May 10, 2024, through Big Hit Music. A music video directed by Lee Sung Jin was released simultaneously with the single's release.

== Track listing ==
- Digital download / streaming
1. "Come Back to Me" – 6:28
2. "Come Back to Me" (radio edit) – 4:13

== Charts ==
Chart performance for "Come Back to Me"
Chart (2024)	Peak position
Canada Digital Song Sales (Billboard)	7
Global 200 (Billboard)	24
Japan Download (Billboard Japan)	18
Japan Digital Singles (Oricon)	16
India International Singles (IMI)	1
Netherlands (Global Top 40)	31
New Zealand Hot Singles (RMNZ)	11
Singapore Regional (RIAS)	20
South Korea (Circle)	81
UK Singles (OCC)	80
US Bubbling Under Hot 100 (Billboard)	3
US Digital Song Sales (Billboard)	3
