= Mono (mixtape) =

2018 playlist by RM

Mixtape by RM
- Released: October 23, 2018
- Studio: Rkive (South Korea)
- Genre: Hip hop
- Length: 24:47
- Language: Korean; English
- Label: Big Hit
- Producer: RM; Adora; El Capitxn; Honne; Kim Jong Wan; Sam Klempner; Supreme Boi

RM chronology
RM (2015)	Mono (2018)	Indigo (2022)

Singles from Mono
- 1. "Forever Rain" Released: October 23, 2018

Mono (stylized as mono.) is the second mixtape by South Korean rapper RM of BTS. It was released on October 23, 2018, through Big Hit Entertainment. It features seven tracks and was accompanied by an animated music video for the final track, "Forever Rain". RM has called Mono a playlist, while other publications have referred to it as a mixtape. It features songs sung and rapped in both Korean and English.

== Background and release ==
RM first teased the mixtape and confirmed its production in March 2018 by posting a clip of an unnamed song through BTS' Twitter account. In June 2018, British electropop duo Honne said in an interview that they had possibly worked on music with RM. They initially gained an interest in collaborating with RM after discovering he was a fan of their music online, and meeting him in Seoul after performing there.

The mixtape itself was first announced on October 20, 2018, along with its track listing, album cover, and release date, through the Big Hit Entertainment Twitter page. The track listing was later shared by RM himself, with Mono described as a "playlist" rather than a traditional mixtape. It includes a track with production by Honne, as well as features the South Korean indie rock band Nell and singer eAeon. Mono is RM's second mixtape, following the release of his 2015 self-titled RM, and the first of his mixtapes to be released commercially.

== Critical reception ==
Professional ratings
Review scores
Source	Rating
NME	4/5 stars

MTV called the mixtape "equal parts wistful and weary, and the theme of loneliness is constant throughout", and said RM lays "his deep insecurities bare on songs like 'Tokyo' and 'Seoul'". Vulture stated "these tracks are the free therapy your body, soul, and bank account collectively require to ease into whatever fresh hell this week will inevitably bring", also saying Mono "sounds like how settling into a lukewarm bath feels: cleansing, just the right amount of steamy, and soothing to the touch". Vulture noted the mixtape contains "the slowest of bangers" and "moody bops", with RM whisper-rapping on "Forever Rain". Billboard noted the mixtape is more introspective than RM's first mixtape, labeling "Moonchild" a "smooth bilingual alt R&B track", "Badbye" as "sorrowful", and "Uhgood" "pensive".

Brandy Robidoux from Hollywood Life called "Forever Rain" one of his most honest tracks, with lyrics that state "When it rains, I feel as if I have some friends / You keep knocking on my windows and asking how am I doing / And I answer – I am still the hostage of life / I live not 'cause I can't die / But I'm still trapped on something". A writer from Billboard called "Moonchild" an ambient hip hop track that reflects on the pain of existence and solace found in moonlight. CelebMix described the Mixtape as, "The growing sensibility of an individual named Namjoon is clearly visible, making it a brilliant coming of age playlist of our time".

== Accolades ==
Year-end lists
Critic/Publication	List	Work	Rank	Ref.
Billboard	The 20 Best K-Pop Albums of 2018: Critics' Picks	mono	6	
Bravo	10 Best K-pop albums of the year	mono	6	
MTV	The 18 Best K-pop B-sides Of 2018	"everythingoes"	18	
Thrillist	The Best Music Videos of 2018	"forever rain"	48	

== Music videos ==
"Forever Rain" opens with a feeling of weariness and loneliness, with conscientious lyrics such as "I wish it rains all day / Cuz then people wouldn't stare at me / Cuz the umbrella would cover the sad face sad face / Cuz in the rain people are busy minding themselves." It is an animated video directed by Choi Jaehoon, who also served as creative director. The animation supervisors were Lee Jinhee and PD Gim Boseong, while editing was completed by Lee Jonhoon. The animators for the music video were Gim Boseong, Kim Bom, Kim Jihwan, Shin Dohyun, Ahn Jaeyoon, Yoon Jongha, Yoon Juri, Lee Jinhee, Jeon Soeun. Jeong dawoon, Jeong Jimin, and Hyun Yujeong.

The song "Seoul" is a lyric video, showing various famous places located in Seoul, such as the Han River, Cheonggyecheon stream, and Seonyudo Island. It features a brief shot of RM sitting in a car outside a convenience store and includes a short phone conversation where he describes his plans to leave. "Seoul" was directed by Choi Yongseok of Lumpens with assistant directors Guzza, Park Hyejeong and Jeong Minje, also from Lumpens. Nam Hyunwoo of GDW acted as the director of photography and Min Joonki of Sunshine Underground is credited with composition.

In the video for "Moonchild", lyrics such as "You say you wanna die but live it much harder / You say you wanna let go but put on another weight / Thinking of not thinking at all is still a thinking, you know" flash across a screen full of glitching lights, pixelation, and bright graphics. Tamar Herman from Billboard stated that it felt like the music video was "offering a sense of provocative solace, with a figure of RM visible at some points". The music video was also directed by Choi Yongseok of Lumpens with assistant directors Guzza, Park Hyejeong and Jeong Minje, also from Lumpens. Nam Hyunwoo of GDW acted as the director of photography and Min Joonki of Sunshine Underground is credited with composition. The construction manager was E Hyun Joon.

== Promotion ==
BTS' Twitter account posted a short message announcing the title and release date, along with an image displaying the track listing. RM did not further promote the mixtape, as the mixtape released alongside BTS' Love Yourself world tour.

== Track listing ==
Mono track listing
No.	Title	Writer(s)	Producer(s)	Length
1.	"Tokyo"	RM; Supreme Boi	Supreme Boi	3:28
2.	"Seoul" (produced by Honne)	RM; Honne	Honne	4:35
3.	"Moonchild"	RM; Hiss Noise	RM; Hiss Noise	3:25
4.	"Badbye" (with eAeon)	RM; El Capitxn	RM; El Capitxn	1:52
5.	"Uhgood" (어긋, Eogeut; lit. "Out of Place")	RM; Sam Klempner	Sam Klempner; El Capitxn^{[a]}	3:14
6.	"Everythingoes" (지나가, Jinaga; with Nell)	RM; Kim Jong-wan	RM; Kim Jong-wan	3:42
7.	"Forever Rain"	RM; Hiss Noise; Adora	RM; Hiss Noise; Adora	4:31
Total length:				24:47

Notes

- ^{^[a]} signifies an additional producer

== Personnel ==
=== Musicians ===
- RM – main vocals (all tracks), whistle (track 1), keyboard (tracks 3, 4, and 7), synthesizer (tracks 3 and 4)
- eAeon – main vocals (track 4)
- Honne – keyboard, synthesizer, background vocals (track 2)
- Kim Jongwan – featured vocals, keyboard, synthesizer, guitar (track 6)
- Supreme Boi – synthesizer (track 1)
- Hiss noise – keyboard (track 3), synthesizer (tracks 3 and 7)
- El Capitxn – synthesizer, keyboard (track 4)
- Lee Taewook – guitar (tracks 4 and 7)
- Sam Klempner – keyboard, synthesizer (track 5)
- Lee Jaekyung – guitar (track 6)
- Lee Junghoon – bass (track 6)
- Jung Jaewon – drums (track 6)
- Adora – keyboard, synthesizer (track 7)

=== Production ===
- RM – executive production, composition, production (tracks 3, 4, 6, 7)
- Pdogg – co-production
- Hiss noise – co-production, production (tracks 3, 7)
- Supreme Boi – production (track 1)
- Honne – production (track 2)
- El Capitxn – production (track 4), additional production (track 5)
- Sam Klempner – production (track 5)
- Kim Jong Wan – production (track 6)
- Adora – production (track 7)

=== Technical ===
- RM @ Rkive – rap and vocal arrangement, recording engineer (all tracks)
- Yang Ga @ Big Hit Studio – mix engineer (tracks 1 and 4)
- Ken Lewis – mix engineer (tracks 2, 3, 5, and 7)
- Kim Jong Wan @ Koko Sound Studio – mix engineer (track 6)
- Dr. Ko @ Koko Sound Studio – mix engineer (track 6)

== Charts ==
=== Weekly charts ===
2018 weekly chart performance for Mono
Chart (2018)	Peak position
Australian Albums (ARIA)	36
Canadian Albums (Billboard)	22
Czech Albums (ČNS IFPI)	31
Dutch Albums (Album Top 100)	29
Estonian Albums (Eesti Ekspress)	2
French Albums (SNEP)	115
Hungarian Albums (MAHASZ)	38
Irish Albums (IRMA)	37
Italian Albums (FIMI)	51
Japanese Digital Albums (Oricon)	3
Japanese Hot Albums (Billboard Japan)	10
Lithuanian Albums (AGATA)	3
Norwegian Albums (VG-lista)	17
Scottish Albums (OCC)	21
Spanish Albums (PROMUSICAE)	19
Swedish Albums (Sverigetopplistan)	28
Swiss Albums (Schweizer Hitparade)	20
US Billboard 200	26
US World Albums (Billboard)	2

2022 weekly chart performance for Mono
Chart (2022)	Peak position
Japanese Digital Albums (Oricon)	17
Japanese Hot Albums (Billboard Japan)	41

=== Year-end charts ===
Year-end chart performance for Mono
Chart (2018)	Position
US World Albums (Billboard)	9

== Release history ==
Region	Date	Format	Label	Ref.
Various	October 23, 2018	Streaming; digital download	Big Hit	
