= List of songs written by RM =

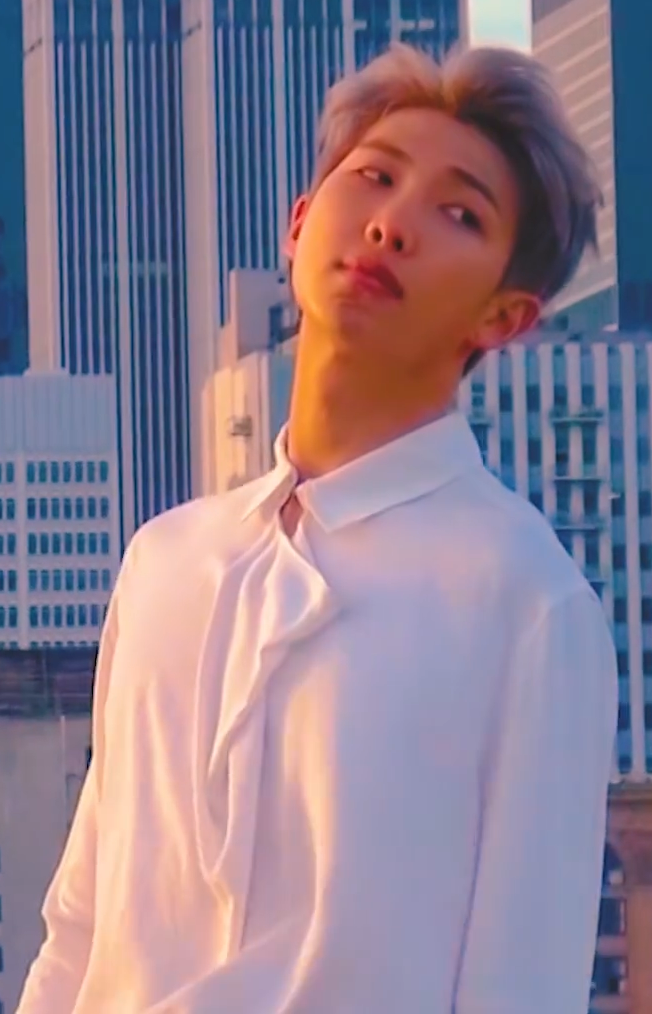
RM at a photoshoot for D Icon magazine in Los Angeles, in November 2017.

South Korean rapper RM (formerly Rap Monster) is best known as the leader of South Korean boy band BTS. He has written and composed much of the band's output since their debut in 2013, often alongside bandmates J-Hope and Suga. As a solo artist, he has written and released two mixtapes: RM (2015) and Mono (2018), and two studio albums: Indigo (2022) and Right Place, Wrong Person (2024). He has 238 songs attributed to his name as a songwriter and composer by the Korea Music Copyright Association — as of August 2026. His credits include solos for his BTS bandmates, music for his various features, and two songs for former Big Hit Entertainment labelmate Glam prior to their disbandment. In December 2020, RM made his debut on the Billboard Hot 100 Songwriters Chart at number three, after six songs that he co-wrote on BTS' fifth Korean-language studio album Be concurrently charted on the Billboard Hot 100.

== Songs ==
Key
†	Indicates single
#	Indicates a non-commercial release
‡	Indicates songs written solely by RM

Song title, original artist, album of release, and year of release
Song	Artist(s)	Writer(s)	Album	Year	Ref.
"ㅠㅠ (Credit Roll)"	RM	RM, Jnkyrd, Kim H., San Yawn, Kim A.	Right Place, Wrong Person	2024	
"? (Interlude)"	RM	RM, BJ Wnjn, Domi and JD Beck, Glowingdog, Jnkyrd, Mokyo, San Yawn	Right Place, Wrong Person	2024	
"00:00 (Zero O'Clock)"	BTS	RM, Pdogg, Jessie Lauryn Foutz, Antonina Armato	Map of the Soul: 7	2020	
"0X1=Lovesong (I Know I Love You)" † (Japanese ver.)	TXT feat. Lilas Ikuta	RM, Max Lynedoch Graham, Matt Thomson, Gabriel Brandes, Will Simms, Danke, "Hitman" Bang, Melanie Fontana, Andrew Migliore, Mod Sun, Slow Rabbit	Chaotic Wonderland	2021	
"0X1=Lovesong (I Know I Love You)"	TXT feat. Mod Sun	RM, Max Lynedoch Graham, Matt Thomson, Gabriel Brandes, Will Simms, Danke, "Hitman" Bang, Melanie Fontana, Andrew Migliore, Mod Sun, Slow Rabbit	The Chaos Chapter: Freeze	2021	
"0X1=Lovesong (I Know I Love You)"	TXT feat. pH-1, Woodie Gochild, Seori	RM, Max Lynedoch Graham, Matt Thomson, Gabriel Brandes, Will Simms, Danke, "Hitman" Bang, Melanie Fontana, Andrew Migliore, Mod Sun, Slow Rabbit, pH-1, Woodie Gochild	The Chaos Chapter: Freeze	2021	
"0X1=Lovesong (I Know I Love You)" †	TXT feat. Seori	RM, Max Lynedoch Graham, Matt Thomson, Gabriel Brandes, Will Simms, Danke, "Hitman" Bang, Melanie Fontana, Andrew Migliore, Mod Sun, Slow Rabbit	The Chaos Chapter: Freeze	2021	
"134340"	BTS	RM, Suga, J-Hope, Pdogg, Adora, Bobby Chung, Martin Luke Brown, Orla Gartland	Love Yourself: Tear	2018	
"2.0"	BTS	RM, J-Hope, V, Jungkook, Suga, Miachel Williams II, Asheton Hogan, Atia Boggs, Charles Hinshaw Jr., John Mitchell, Derrick Milano, Pdogg	Arirang	2026	
"21st Century Girls"	BTS	RM, Pdogg, "Hitman" Bang, Supreme Boi	Wings	2016	
"24/7=Heaven"	BTS	Rap Monster, Suga, Slow Rabbit, J-Hope, Pdogg	Dark & Wild	2014	
"2nd Grade"	BTS	Rap Monster, Suga, Supreme Boi, J-Hope, Pdogg	Dark & Wild	2014	
"4 O'Clock" #	RM, V	RM, V, Shaun	Non-album single	2017	
"A Supplementary Story: You Never Walk Alone"	BTS	Rap Monster, Suga, Supreme Boi, J-Hope, "Hitman" Bang, Pdogg	You Never Walk Alone	2017	
"Abyss" #	Jin	RM, Bumzu, Jin, Pdogg	Non-album single	2020	
"Adrift" ‡ (표류)	Rap Monster	Rap Monster	RM	2015	
"Adult Child" #	Rap Monster, Suga, Jin	Rap Monster, Suga	Non-album single	2013	
"Airplane Pt. 2"	BTS	RM, Suga, J-Hope, "Hitman" Bang, Pdogg, Ali Tamposi, Roman Campolo, Liza Owens	Love Yourself: Tear	2018	
"Aliens"	BTS	RM, J-Hope, Jungkook, Suga, Michael Williams II, Asheton Hogan, Brandon Bell, Khaled Rohaim, Charles Hinshaw, Jean Marcel Day Jr., James Essein, John Mitchell, Derrick Milano, Pdogg	Arirang	2026	
"All Day"	RM feat. Tablo	RM, Pdogg, Tablo	Indigo	2022	
"All Night"	BTS feat. Juice Wrld	RM, Suga, Powers Pleasant, Juice Wrld, Marric Strobert	BTS World: Original Soundtrack	2019	
"Am I Wrong"	BTS	Rap Monster, Keb' Mo', Sam Klempner, James Reynolds, Josh Wilkinson, Supreme Boi, Gaeko, Pdogg, Adora	Wings	2016	
"Anpanman"	BTS	RM, Suga, Supreme Boi, "Hitman" Bang, Pdogg, Jinbo	Love Yourself: Tear	2018	
"Answer: Love Myself"	BTS	RM, Suga, J-Hope, Pdogg, Bobby Chung, Ray Michael Djan Jr., Ashton Foster, DJ Swivel, Candace Nicole Sosa, Conor Maynard	Love Yourself: Answer	2018	
"Around the World in a Day"	RM feat. Moses Sumney	RM, Gimjonny, Jclef, Jnkyrd, Moses Sumney, No Identity, San Yawn, Kim A., Eun	Right Place, Wrong Person	2024	
"Attack on Bangtan"	BTS	Rap Monster, Suga, Supreme Boi, J-Hope, Pdogg	O!RUL8,2?	2013	
"Attack on Bangtan" (Japanese version)	BTS	Rap Monster, Suga, Supreme Boi, J-Hope, Pdogg	Wake Up	2014	
"Awake"	BTS	Rap Monster, Slow Rabbit, Jin, J-Hope, June, Pdogg, "Hitman" Bang	Wings	2016	
"Awakening" ‡ (각성)	Rap Monster	Rap Monster	RM	2015	
"Badbye" ‡	RM with eAeon	RM	mono.	2018	
"Begin"	BTS	Rap Monster, Tony Esterly, David Quinones	Wings	2016	
"Best of Me"	BTS	RM, Suga, "Hitman" Bang, J-Hope, Pdogg, Andrew Taggart, Ray Michael Djan Jr., Ashton Foster, Adora, Sam Klempner	Love Yourself: Her	2017	
"Best of Me" (Japanese ver.)	BTS	RM, Suga, Andrew Taggart, Pdogg, Ray Michael Djan Jr., Ashton Foster, Sam Klempner, "Hitman" Bang, J-Hope, Adora	Face Yourself	2018	
"Black Swan" †	BTS	RM, Suga, Pdogg, Rigo August, Vince Nantes, Kelly Clyde	Map of the Soul: 7	2020	
"Blood Sweat & Tears" †	BTS	Rap Monster, Suga, Pdogg, J-Hope, "Hitman" Bang, Kim Do-hoon	Wings; Proof	2016	
"Blood Sweat & Tears" (Japanese ver.) †	BTS	RM, Suga, "Hitman" Bang, J-Hope, Pdogg, Kim Do-hoon	Face Yourself	2018	
"Blue & Grey"	BTS	RM, Suga, J-Hope, V, Hiss Noise, Levi, Metaphor, Park Ji-soo	Be	2020	
"Body to Body" (Note: interpolates "Arirang", a traditional Korean folk song)	BTS	RM, Suga, J-Hope, Ryan Tedder, Maxime Picard, Thomas Pentz, Akira Evans, Teezo Touchdown, Pdogg, Kirsten Spencer	Arirang	2026	
"Born Singer" (Note: samples "Born Sinner" from J. Cole's 2013 album of the same name)	BTS	RM, Suga, Jermaine Cole, James Fauntleroy II, Anthony Parrino, Canei Finch, Juro "Mez" Davis, Ibrahim Hamad, J-Hope	Proof	2022	
"Boy In Luv" †	BTS	Rap Monster, Suga, Supreme Boi, "Hitman" Bang, Pdogg	Skool Luv Affair; Proof	2014	
"Boy In Luv" (Demo version)	BTS	RM, Suga, Supreme Boi, "Hitman" Bang, Pdogg	Proof	2022	
"Boy In Luv" (Japanese version) †	BTS	Rap Monster, Suga, Supreme Boi, "Hitman" Bang, Pdogg, KM-MARKIT	Wake Up	2014	
"Boy with Luv" †	BTS feat. Halsey	RM, Suga, Pdogg, J-Hope, "Hitman" Bang, Melanie Joy Fontana, Michel "Lindgren" Schulz, Halsey, Emily Weisband	Map of the Soul: Persona; Proof	2019	
"Boyz with Fun" (흥탄소년단)	BTS	Rap Monster, Suga, J-Hope, V, Jimin, Jin, "Hitman" Bang, Pdogg	The Most Beautiful Moment in Life, Pt. 1	2015	
"Boyz with Fun" (Demo ver.)	BTS	RM, Suga, "Hitman" Bang, J-Hope, Pdogg, Jin, V, Jimin	Proof	2022	
"Boyz With Fun" (Japanese Version) (フンタン少年団)	BTS	Rap Monster, Suga, "Hitman" Bang, J-Hope, Pdogg, Jin, V, Jimin	Youth	2016	
"Blanket Kick"	BTS	Rap Monster, Suga, Slow Rabbit, Shaun, J-Hope, "Hitman" Bang, Pdogg	Dark & Wild	2014	
"BTS Cypher Pt. 1"	BTS	Rap Monster, Suga, Supreme Boi, J-Hope	O!RUL8,2?	2013	
"BTS Cypher Pt. 2: Triptych"	BTS	Rap Monster, Suga, Supreme Boi, J-Hope	Skool Luv Affair	2014	
"BTS Cypher Pt. 3: Killer"	BTS feat. Supreme Boi	Rap Monster, Suga, Supreme Boi, J-Hope	Dark & Wild; Proof	2014	
"BTS Cypher Pt. 4"	BTS	Rap Monster, Suga, Chris 'Tricky' Stewart, Medor J. Pierre, J-Hope	Wings	2016	
"BuckuBucku" (부끄부끄)	MFBTY feat. EE, Dino-J, Rap Monster	Rap Monster, Dino-J, Yoon Mi-rae, Bizzy, Tiger JK, Lee Hyun-jun, Lee Yun Joung	Wondaland	2015	
"Butter"	BTS	RM, Jenna Andrews, Alexander Bilowitz, Sebastian Garcia, Robert Grimaldi, Stephen Kirk, Ron Perry	Non-album single	2021	
"Butterfly"	BTS	Rap Monster, Suga, Slow Rabbit, "Hitman" Bang, Pdogg, Brother Su, J-Hope	The Most Beautiful Moment in Life, Pt. 2	2015	
"Butterfly" (Alternative Mix)	BTS	Rap Monster, Suga, "Hitman" Bang, Slow Rabbit, Pdogg, Brother Su, J-Hope	The Most Beautiful Moment in Life: Young Forever	2016	
"Butterfly" (Japanese ver.)	BTS	Rap Monster, Suga, "Hitman" Bang, Pdogg, Brother Su, Slow Rabbit, J-Hope	Youth	2016	
"Bicycle" #	RM	RM, John Eun	Non-album single	2021	
"Change"	RM, (Note: RM changed his name from "Rap Monster" to "RM" in 2017; this was one of his first works credited under the new name) Wale	RM, Wale, Pdogg	Non-album single	2017	
"Change Pt. 2"	RM	RM, eAeon	Indigo	2022	
"Champion" (Remix)	Fall Out Boy feat. RM	RM, Patrick Stump, Andy Hurley, Jesse Shatkin, Sia, Joe Trohman, Pete Wentz	Mania	2017	
"Changmin's Music Plaza (Hip Hop version)"	BTS	Rap Monster, Pdogg	Non-album single	2015	
"Christmas Love" #	Jimin	RM, Slow Rabbit, Jimin	Non-album single	2020	
"Closer"	RM feat. Paul Blanco, Mahalia	RM, Andy Clutterbuck, James Hatcher, Mahalia Burkmar, Benjamin Hart, Paul Blanco, Pdogg	Indigo	2022	
"Coffee"	BTS	Rap Monster, Suga, Slow Rabbit, J-Hope, Pdogg, Urban Zakapa	O!RUL8,2?	2013	
"Come Back to Me"†	RM	RM, Jnkyrd, Kuo, Oh Hyuk, San Yawn	Right Place, Wrong Person	2024	
"Come Back Home"	BTS	Rap Monster, Seo Taiji, Supreme Boi, J-Hope	Non-album single	2017	
"Come Over"	BTS	RM, Suga, J-Hope, Henry Walter, Joshua Colemamn, Jacob Kasher Hindlin, Gregory Aldae Hein, El Captitxn	Arirang	2026	
"Converse High"	BTS	Rap Monster, Suga, Slow Rabbit, J-Hope, Pdogg	The Most Beautiful Moment in Life, Pt. 1	2015	
"Could You Turn off Your Cellphone?"	BTS	Rap Monster, Suga, J-Hope, Pdogg	Dark & Wild	2014	
"Crying Over You"	Honne, Beka, RM	RM, Andrew Peter Clutterbuck, James William Hatcher, Anna Lotterud	Non-album single	2019	
"Crystal Snow"	BTS	RM, Kanata Okajima, Soma Genda	Face Yourself	2018	
"D-Day"	Agust D	RM, Agust D, Invincible, 2Live	D-Day	2023	
"Danger" †	BTS	Rap Monster, Suga, J-Hope, "Hitman" Bang, Pdogg, Thanh Bui	Dark & Wild; Proof	2014	
"Danger" (Japanese version)" †	BTS	Rap Monster, Suga, J-Hope, "Hitman" Bang, Pdogg, Thanh Bui, KM-MARKIT	Wake Up	2014	
"Ddaeng" # (땡)	RM, Suga, J-Hope	RM, Suga, J.Pearl, J-Hope	Non-album single	2018	
"Dead Leaves" (고엽)	BTS	Rap Monster, Suga, Slow Rabbit, J-Hope, Jungkook, "Hitman" Bang, Pdogg	The Most Beautiful Moment in Life, Pt. 2	2015	
"Dilemma"	Homme	Rap Monster, "Hitman" Bang	Non-album single	2016	
"Dimple"	BTS	RM, Allison Kaplan, Matthew Tishler	Love Yourself: Her	2017	
"Dis-ease"	BTS	RM, Suga, J-Hope, Jimin, Ghstloop, Pdogg, Ivan Jackson Rosenberg, Randy Runyon	Be	2020	
"DNA" †	BTS	RM, Suga, "Hitman" Bang, Supreme Boi, Pdogg, KASS	Love Yourself: Her; Proof	2017	
"DNA" (Japanese ver.) †	BTS	RM, Suga, Pdogg, "Hitman" Bang, Supreme Boi, KASS	Face Yourself	2018	
"DNA" (Pedal 2 LA Mix)	BTS	RM, Suga, Supreme Boi, KASS, "Hitman" Bang, Pdogg	Love Yourself: Answer	2018	
"Do You" ‡ †	Rap Monster	Rap Monster	RM	2015	
"Domodachi"	RM feat. Lil Simz	RM, BJ Wnjn, Jnkyrd, Mokyo, Nancy Boy, San Yawn, Simbiatu Ajikawo, Kim A., Lee Tae-hoon	Right Place, Wrong Person	2024	
"Don't" †	eAeon feat. RM	RM, eAeon	Fragile	2021	
"Dope" †	BTS	Rap Monster, Suga, J-Hope, "Hitman" Bang, Gwis Bang Mang, Slow Rabbit, Pdogg	The Most Beautiful Moment in Life, Pt. 1	2015	
"Dope" (Japanese ver.)	BTS	Rap Monster, Suga, Ahn Tae Seok, Gwis Bang Mang, "Hitman" Bang, J-Hope, Pdogg	Youth	2016	
"Dionysus"	BTS	RM, Suga, Supreme Boi, J-Hope, Pdogg, Roman Campolo	Map of the Soul: Persona	2019	
"Epilogue: Young Forever" †	BTS	Rap Monster, Suga, Slow Rabbit, J-Hope, "Hitman" Bang	The Most Beautiful Moment in Life: Young Forever	2016	
"Epilogue: Young Forever" (Japanese ver.)	BTS	Rap Monster, Suga, "Hitman" Bang, J-Hope, Slow Rabbit	Youth	2016	
"Euphoria"	BTS	RM, Jordan "DJ Swivel" Young, Candace Nicole Sosa, Melanie Joy Fontana, "Hitman" Bang, Supreme Boi, Adora	Love Yourself: Answer	2018	
"Everythingoes" ‡	RM with Nell	RM	mono.	2018	
"Face Off"	Jimin	RM, Jimin, Pdogg, Ghstloop, Evan	Face	2023	
"Fake Love" †	BTS	RM, Pdogg, "Hitman" Bang	Love Yourself: Tear	2018	
"Fake Love" Rocking Vibe mix	BTS	RM, Pdogg, "Hitman" Bang	Love Yourself: Tear	2018	
"Fantastic"	Rap Monster, Mandy Ventrice	Rap Monster, James F. Reynolds, White N3rd	Non-album single	2015	
"Fly to My Room"	BTS	RM, Suga, J-Hope, Joe Femi Griffith, Cosmo's Midnight	Be	2020	
"Forever Rain" ‡ †	RM	RM	mono.	2018	
"Forg_tful"	RM feat. Kim Sa-wol	RM, John Eun	Indigo	2022	
"Fire" †	BTS	Rap Monster, Suga, Han Sang-hee, "Hitman" Bang, Pdogg, Devine Channel	The Most Beautiful Moment in Life: Young Forever; Proof	2016	
"Fire" (Japanese ver.)	BTS	Rap Monster, Suga, "Hitman" Bang, Han Sang-hee, Lim Kwang-wook, Devine Channel, Pdogg	Youth	2016	
"For You" †	BTS	Rap Monster, Suga, HIRO, J-Hope, Pdogg, UTA	Youth	2016	
"For Youth"	BTS	RM, Suga, Imad Royal, Rogét Chahayed, Blaise Railey, Drew Love, 4rest, J-Hope, Hiss Noise, Slow Rabbit, "Hitman" Bang	Proof	2022	
"Fya"	BTS	RM, Jungkook, Suga, JPEGMafia, Gregory Aldae Hein, Kurtis Wells, Thomas Pentz, Richard Mears IV, Harley Streten	Arirang	2026	
"Gajah" (코끼리)	Gaeko feat. Rap Monster	Rap Monster, Gaeko	Non-album single	2017	
"Good Day"	BTS	Rap Monster, Suga, Matt Cab, J-Hope, Ryuja	Youth	2016	
"Groin"	RM	RM, Jnkyrd, Kim Han-joo, Mokyo, San Yawn	Right Place, Wrong Person	2024	
"Heartbeat"	BTS	RM, Bang Shi-hyuk, J-Hope, Lee Hyun, Supreme Boi, Jordan Young, Coyle Girelli	BTS World: Original Soundtrack	2019	
"Heaven"	RM	RM, Jnkyrd, Rad Museum, San Yawn, Sojeso, Unsinkable	Right Place, Wrong Person	2024	
"Hectic"	RM feat. Colde	RM, Pdogg, Colde	Indigo	2022	
"Hip Hop Phile"	BTS	Rap Monster, Suga, J-Hope, Pdogg	Dark & Wild	2014	
"Hold Me Tight"	BTS	Rap Monster, Suga, Slow Rabbit, Pdogg, V, J-Hope, Kim Beon-chang	The Most Beautiful Moment in Life, Pt. 1	2015	
"Home"	BTS	RM, Suga, J-Hope, Adora, Bobby Chung, Pdogg, Song Jae-kyung, Lauren Dyson, Tushar Apte, Krysta Youngs, Julia Ross	Map of the Soul: Persona	2019	
"Hooligan"	BTS	RM, Suga, J-Hope, Jungkook, Pablo Diaz Reixa, Michel Magne, Pablo Martinez Alborch, Marcus Lomax, Xplicit, Delacey, Jasper Harris, Derrick Milano, Pdogg, Kirsten Spencer	Arirang	2026	
"I Believe" ‡	Rap Monster	Rap Monster	RM	2015	
"I Like It"	BTS	Rap Monster, Suga, Slow Rabbit, J-Hope	2 Cool 4 Skool	2013	
"I Like It" (Japanese version)	BTS	Rap Monster, Suga, Slow Rabbit, J-Hope	Wake Up	2014	
"I Like It" (Slow Jam Remix)	BTS	Rap Monster, Suga, Slow Rabbit, J-Hope, Pdogg, Brother Su	Skool Luv Affair Special Addition	2014	
"I Like It Pt. 2"	BTS	Rap Monster, Suga, Slow Rabbit, J-Hope	Wake Up	2014	
"I Like That"	Glam	Rap Monster, "Hitman" Bang, Pdogg, Cole David Byron	Non-album single	2012	
"I Need U" †	BTS	Rap Monster, Suga, Pdogg, "Hitman" Bang, Brother Su	The Most Beautiful Moment in Life, Pt. 1	2015	
"I Need U" (Demo ver.)	BTS	RM, Suga, Pdogg, "Hitman" Bang, Brother Su, J-Hope	Proof	2022	
"I Need U" (Japanese ver.) †	BTS	Rap Monster, Suga, "Hitman" Bang, Brother Su, J-Hope	Youth	2016	
"I Need U" (Urban Mix)	BTS	Rap Monster, Suga, Pdogg, "Hitman" Bang, Brother Su	The Most Beautiful Moment in Life, Pt. 1	2016	
"I Need U" (Remix)	BTS	Rap Monster, Suga, Pdogg, "Hitman" Bang, Brother Su	The Most Beautiful Moment in Life, Pt. 1	2016	
"I Know" ‡ #	Rap Monster, Jungkook	Rap Monster	Non-album single	2016	
"I'm Fine"	BTS	RM, Suga, Yoon Kita, J-Hope, Bobby Chung, Pdogg, Lauren Dyson, Ray Michael Djan Jr., Ashton Foster, DJ Swivel, Candace Nicole Sosa, Samantha Harper	Love Yourself: Answer	2018	
"If I Ruled the World"	BTS	Rap Monster, Suga, Pdogg, J-Hope	O!RUL8,2?	2013	
"In the Soop" #	BTS	RM, Suga, J-Hope, V, Jimin, Jungkook, Jin	Non-album single	2020	
"Inner Child"	BTS	RM, Matt Thomson, Max Lynedoch Graham, Ryan Lawrie, Ellis Miah, Adien Lewis, Pdogg, V, James F. Reynolds	Map of the Soul: 7	2020	
"Interlude: Shadow"	BTS	RM, Suga, El Capitxn, Ghstloop, Pdogg	Map of the Soul: 7	2020	
"Interlude: Wings"	BTS	Rap Monster, Suga, Pdogg, Adora, J-Hope	Wings	2016	
"Intro: Boy Meets Evil"	BTS	Rap Monster, J-Hope, Pdogg	Wings	2016	
"Intro: Never Mind"	BTS	Rap Monster, Suga, J-Hope, Slow Rabbit	The Most Beautiful Moment in Life, Pt. 2	2015	
"Intro: O!RUL8,2?"	BTS	Rap Monster, Pdogg	Map of the Soul: Persona	2019	
"Intro: Persona"	BTS (Note: credited to BTS but is a solo track by RM)	RM, Hiss Noise, Pdogg	O!RUL8,2?	2013	
"Intro: Ringwanderung"	BTS	RM, Suga, Adora, "Hitman" Bang, Ray Michael Djan Jr., Ashton Foster, J-Hope, Pdogg, Sam Klempner, Andrew Taggart, UTA	Face Yourself	2018	
"Intro: Serendipity"	BTS	RM, "Hitman" Bang, Slow Rabbit, Ray Michael Djan Jr, Ashton Foster	Love Yourself: Her	2017	
"Intro: Singularity"	BTS	RM, Charlie J. Perry	Love Yourself: Tear	2018	
"Idol" †	BTS	RM, Pdogg, Supreme Boi, "Hitman" Bang, Ali Tamposi, Roman Campolo	Love Yourself: Answer	2018	
"Idol"	BTS feat. Nicki Minaj	RM, Pdogg, Supreme Boi, "Hitman" Bang, Ali Tamposi, Roman Campolo, Nicki Minaj	Love Yourself: Answer	2018	
"Into the Sun"	BTS	RM, Suga, J-Hope, Pdogg, Thomas Pentz, V, Jimin, Teezzo Touchdown, Ki-An Dee Kambaran, Richard Mears IV, Tyler Johnson, Ghstloop,	Arirang	2026	
"Intro: Skool Luv Affair"	BTS	Rap Monster, Suga, Slow Rabbit, J-Hope, Pdogg	Skool Luv Affair	2014	
"Intro: What am I to You"	BTS	Rap Monster, Pdogg	Dark & Wild	2014	
"Introduction: Youth"	BTS	Rap Monster, Suga, "Hitman" Bang, Pdogg, V, Jungkook, J-Hope, UTA, HIRO, Brother Su, Devine Channel	Youth	2016	
"Jamais Vu"	BTS	RM, Marcus McCoan, Owen Roberts, Matty Thomson, Max Lynedoch Graham, James F. Reynolds, J-Hope, "Hitman" Bang	Map of the Soul: Persona	2019	
"Joke" ‡ (농담)	Rap Monster	Rap Monster	RM	2015	
"Jump"	BTS	Rap Monster, Suga, Supreme Boi, J-Hope, Pdogg	Skool Luv Affair	2014	
"Jump" (Demo Version)	BTS	Rap Monster, Suga, Pdogg, Supreme Boi	Proof	2022	
"Jump" (Japanese version)	BTS	Rap Monster, Suga, Supreme Boi, J-Hope, Pdogg	Wake Up	2014	
"Just One Day" †	BTS	Rap Monster, Suga, J-Hope, Pdogg	Skool Luv Affair	2014	
"Just One Day" (extended Japanese version)	BTS	Rap Monster, Suga, J-Hope, Pdogg	Wake Up	2014	
"Let Me Know"	BTS	Rap Monster, Suga, J-Hope, Pdogg	Dark & Wild	2014	
"Life" ‡	Rap Monster	Rap Monster	RM	2015	
"Life Goes On" †	BTS	RM, Suga, J-Hope, Pdogg, Antonina Armato, Christopher Brenner, Ruuth	Be; Proof	2020	
"Life Goes On"	Agust D	RM, Agust D, El Capitxn, Blvsh, J-Hope, Pdogg, Antonina Armato, Christopher Brenner	D-Day	2023	
"Like Animals"	BTS	RM, Thomas Pentz, Artemas Diamandis, Toby Daintree, Jesse Fink, Kevin White, Kirsten Spencer, Beau Nox	Arirang	2026	
"Like Crazy" †	Jimin	RM, Jimin, Pdogg, Blvsh, Chris James, Ghstloop, Evan	Face	2023	
"Look Here"	BTS	Rap Monster, Suga, J-Hope, Jinbo, Lee Ho-hyoung	Dark & Wild	2014	
"Lonely"	RM	RM, Pdogg	Indigo	2022	
"Lost"	BTS	Rap Monster, Pdogg, Supreme Boi, Peter Ibsen, Richard Rawson, Lee Paul Williams, June	Wings	2016	
"Lost!" †	RM	RM, Jclef, Jnkyrd, Kim H., Marldn, Nancy Boy, San Yawn, Unsinkable, Kim A.	Right Place, Wrong Person	2024	
"Louder Than Bombs"	BTS	RM, Suga, J-Hope, Allie X, Bram Inscore, Leland, Troye Sivan	Map of the Soul: 7	2020	
"Love Is Not Over" (Full Length Edition)	BTS	Rap Monster, Suga, Slow Rabbit, Jungkook, Jin, Pdogg, J-Hope	The Most Beautiful Moment in Life: Young Forever	2016	
"Love Maze"	BTS	RM, Suga, Yoon Kita, J-Hope, Adora, Bobby Chung, Pdogg, DJ Swivel, Candace Nicole Sosa	Love Yourself: Tear	2018	
"Love U Hate U"	2AM	Rap Monster, "Hitman" Bang, Supreme Boi, Jung Hun-Chul	Saint O'Clock	2010	
"Ma City"	BTS	Rap Monster, Suga, J-Hope, "Hitman" Bang, Pdogg	The Most Beautiful Moment in Life, Pt. 2	2015	
"Magic Shop"	BTS	RM, Suga, J-Hope, Jungkook, Adora, Hiss noise, DJ Swivel, Candace Nicole Sosa	Love Yourself: Tear	2018	
"Make It Right" †	BTS	RM, Suga, J-Hope, Ed Sheeran, Fred Gibson, Jo Hill, Benjamin Gibson	Map of the Soul: Persona	2019	
"Merry Go Round"	BTS	RM, Suga, J-Hope, Sam Homaee, Sarah Aarons, Gregoey Aldae Hein, Kevin Parker, Derrick Milano, Pdogg	Arirang	2026	
"Mikrokosmos"	BTS	RM, Suga, J-Hope, Melanie Joy Fontana, Michel "Lindgren" Schulz, DJ Swivel, Candace Nicole Sosa, Marcus McCoan, Matty Thomson, Max Lynedoch Graham, Ryan Lawrie, Camilla Reynolds	Map of the Soul: Persona	2019	
"Mic Drop" †	BTS	RM, "Hitman" Bang, Supreme Boi, J-Hope, Pdogg	Love Yourself: Her	2017	
"Mic Drop" (Japanese ver.)	BTS	RM, "Hitman" Bang, Supreme Boi, J-Hope, Pdogg	Face Yourself	2018	
"Mic Drop" Steve Aoki Remix	BTS feat. Desiigner	RM, Steve Aoki, Pdogg, Supreme Boi, "Hitman" Bang, J-Hope, Desiigner, Tayla Parx, Flowsik, Shae Jacobs	Non-album single	2017	
"Mic Drop" Steve Aoki Remix Full Length Edition	BTS	RM, Pdogg, Supreme Boi, "Hitman" Bang, J-Hope	Love Yourself: Answer	2018	
"Miss Right"	BTS	Rap Monster, Suga, Slow Rabbit, J-Hope, "Hitman" Bang, Pdogg	Skool Luv Affair Special Addition	2014	
"Monster" ‡	Rap Monster	Rap Monster	RM	2015	
"Moon"	BTS	RM, Slow Rabbit, Jin, Adora, Jordan "DJ Swivel" Young, Candace Nicole Sosa, Daniel Caesar, Ludwig Lindell	Map of the Soul: 7	2020	
"Moonchild" ‡	RM	RM	mono.	2018	
"Moving On"	BTS	Rap Monster, Suga, J-Hope, Pdogg	The Most Beautiful Moment in Life, Pt. 1	2015	
"My Time"	BTS	RM, Jungkook, Pdogg, Board Printz, Deryk Mitchell (Sleep Deez), Jayrah Gibson, Richelle Alleyne	Map of the Soul: 7	2020	
"My Universe" †	Coldplay x BTS	RM, Suga, J-Hope, Oscar Holter, Guy Berryman, Jonny Buckland, Will Champion, Chris Martin, Max Martin, Bill Rhako	Music of the Spheres	2021	
"N.O" †	BTS	Rap Monster, Suga, Supreme Boi, "Hitman" Bang, Pdogg	O!RUL8,2? Proof	2013	
"N.O." (Japanese version)	BTS	Rap Monster, Suga, Supreme Boi, "Hitman" Bang, Pdogg	Wake Up	2014	
"No.2"	RM feat. Park Ji-yoon	RM, Eun	Indigo	2022	
"Normal"	BTS	RM, J-Hope, Suga, Sean Foreman, Livvi Franc, Ryan Tedder, Sean Cook, Kirsten Spencer, Derrick Milano, Pdogg	Arirang	2026	
"Neva Play" †	RM, Megan Thee Stallion	RM, Shae Oluwaseyi Jacobs, Megan Pete, Adrienne Danielle Ben Haim, Brandon Hamlin, Joseph Peter Fenn, Martrel Julian Mason	Megan Act II	2024	
"No More Dream" †	BTS	Rap Monster, Suga, Supreme Boi, J-Hope, "Hitman" Bang, Pdogg, Jungkook	2 Cool 4 Skool; Proof	2013	
"No More Dream" (Japanese version) †	BTS	Rap Monster, Suga, Supreme Boi, J-Hope, "Hitman" Bang, Pdogg	Wake Up	2014	
"Not Today" †	BTS	Rap Monster, Pdogg, "Hitman" Bang, Supreme Boi, June	You Never Walk Alone	2017	
"Not Today" (Japanese ver.)	BTS	RM, "Hitman" Bang, KASS, Pdogg, Suga, Supreme Boi	Face Yourself	2018	
"Nuts"	RM	RM, BJ Wnjn, Jnkyrd, Mokyo, Nancy Boy, San Yawn, Kim Ah-il, Lee Tae-hoon	Right Place, Wrong Person	2024	
"On" †	BTS	RM, Suga, J-Hope, Pdogg, Antonina Armato, Melanie Joy Fontana, August Rigo, Michel "Lindgren" Schulz, Krysta Youngs, Julia Ross	Map of the Soul: 7 Proof	2020	
"One More Night"	BTS	RM, Suga, J-Hope, Thomas Pentz, Pdogg, Beau Nox, Richard Mears IV, Ant Clemons	Arirang	2026	
"On"	BTS feat. Sia	RM, Suga, J-Hope, Pdogg, Antonina Armato, Melanie Joy Fontana, August Rigo, Michel "Lindgren" Schulz, Krysta Youngs, Julia Ross	Map of the Soul: 7	2020	
"Out of Love"	RM	RM, Icecream Drum, Jnkyrd, No Identity, San Yawn, Supreme Boi, Unsinkable, Zior Park, Im Ju-seung	Right Place, Wrong Person	2024	
"Outro"	BTS	Rap Monster, Shingo Suzuki	Wake Up	2014	
"Outro: Circle Room Cypher"	BTS	Rap Monster, Suga, J-Hope, V, Jimin, Jungkook, Jin, Pdogg	2 Cool 4 Skool	2013	
"Outro: Her"	BTS	RM, Suga, J-Hope, Slow Rabbit	Love Yourself: Her; Love Yourself: Answer; Proof	2017	
"Outro: Tear"	BTS	RM, Suga, J-Hope, DOCSKIM, Shin Myung-soo	Love Yourself: Tear; Love Yourself: Answer	2018	
"Outro: Wings"	BTS	Rap Monster, Suga, J-Hope, Adora, Pdogg	You Never Walk Alone	2017	
"P.D.D." ‡	Rap Monster, Warren G	Rap Monster	Non-album single	2015	
"Paradise"	BTS	RM, Suga, J-Hope, Song Jae-kyung, MNEK, Lophiile	Love Yourself: Tear	2018	
"Party (XXO)"	Glam	Rap Monster, "Hitman" Bang, Wonderkid, Pdogg, Nakas Georgios, Lundvik John Hassim	Non-album single	2012	
"Path"	BTS	Rap Monster, Suga, J-Hope, "Hitman" Bang, Pdogg	2 Cool 4 Skool	2013	
"Perfect Christmas"	Rap Monster, Jungkook, Jo Kwon, Lim Jeong Hee, Joo Hee	Rap Monster, Esna	Non-album single	2013	
"Pied Piper"	BTS	RM, Suga, Jinbo, "Hitman" Bang, J-Hope, Pdogg, KASS	Love Yourself: Her	2017	
"Please"	BTS	RM, Suga, J-Hope, Tyler Spry, James Essein, Ryan Tedder	Arirang	2026	
"Prometheus"	Yankie feat. Dok2, Juvie Train, Double K, Rap Monster, Topbob, Don Mills	Rap Monster, Don Mills, Juvie Train, Yang Jun Mo, Topbob, Double K, Dok2	Andre	2015	
"Promise" #	Jimin	RM, Jimin	Non-album single	2018	
"Rain"	BTS	Rap Monster, Suga, Slow Rabbit, J-Hope	Dark & Wild	2014	
"Reflection"	BTS	Rap Monster, Slow Rabbit	Wings	2016	
"Respect"	BTS	RM, Suga, El Capitxn, Hiss Noise	Map of the Soul: 7	2020	
"Right People, Wrong Place"	RM	RM, Jnkyrd, Kwak Jin-eon, Mokyo, San Yawn, Unsinkable, Eun Hee-young	Right Place, Wrong Person	2024	
"Run" †	BTS	Rap Monster, Suga, J-Hope, V, Jungkook, "Hitman" Bang, Pdogg	The Most Beautiful Moment in Life, Pt. 2 Proof	2015	
"Run" (Alternative Mix)	BTS	Rap Monster, Suga, J-Hope, V, Jungkook, "Hitman" Bang, Pdogg	The Most Beautiful Moment in Life: Young Forever	2016	
"Run" (Ballad Mix)	BTS	Rap Monster, Suga, J-Hope, V, Jungkook, "Hitman" Bang, Pdogg	The Most Beautiful Moment in Life: Young Forever	2016	
"Run" (Japanese ver.) †	BTS	Rap Monster, Suga, J-Hope, V, Jungkook, "Hitman" Bang, Pdogg	Youth	2016	
"Run BTS" (달려라 방탄)	BTS	RM, Suga, Dwayne Abernathy Jr., Ebenezer, J-Hope, Ghstloop, Jungkook, Oneye (Pontus Kalm), Daniel Caesar, Ludwig Lindell, Melanie Joy Fontana, Michel "Lindgren" Schulz, Feli Ferraro	Proof	2022	
"Rush"	Rap Monster feat. Krizz Kaliko	Rap Monster, Krizz Kaliko	RM	2015	
"Satoori Rap"	BTS	Rap Monster, Suga, J-Hope, Pdogg	O!RUL8,2?	2013	
"Save Me" †	BTS	Rap Monster, Suga, J-Hope, Pdogg, Ray Michael Djan Jr., Ashton Foster, Samantha Harper	The Most Beautiful Moment in Life: Young Forever	2016	
"Save Me" (Japanese ver.)	BTS	Rap Monster, Suga, Ashton Foster, J-Hope, Pdogg, Ray Michael Djan Jr., Samantha Harper	Youth	2016	
"Sea"	BTS	RM, Suga, J-Hope, Slow Rabbit	Love Yourself: Her	2017	
"Seoul" ‡	RM prod. Honne	RM	mono.	2018	
"Seoul Town Road" (Old Town Road Remix)	Lil Nas X feat. RM	RM, Lil Nas X, Trent Reznor, Atticus Ross, Kiowa Roukema, Billy Ray Cyrus	Non-album single	2019	
"Serendipity" (Full Length Edition)	BTS	RM, Slow Rabbit, Ray Michael Djan Jr., Ashton Foster, "Hitman" Bang	Love Yourself: Answer	2018	
"Sexy Nukim"	Balming Tiger feat. RM	RM, Mudd the student, Omega Sapien, bj wnjn	Non-album single	2022	
"Skit: On the Start Line" ‡	BTS	Rap Monster	2 Cool 4 Skool	2013	
"Silver Spoon" (뱁새)	BTS	Rap Monster, Pdogg, Supreme Boi, Slow Rabbit	Youth	2015	
"Silver Spoon" (Japanese ver.)	BTS	Rap Monster, Pdogg, Supreme Boi, Slow Rabbit	The Most Beautiful Moment in Life, Pt. 2	2016	
"Skit"	BTS	RM, Suga, Jin, J-Hope, Jimin, Jungkook, V	Be	2020	
"Smoke Sprite" †	So!Yoon! feat. RM of BTS	RM, Hwang So-yoon, Seo Chae-rin	Episode1: Love	2023	
"So What"	BTS	RM, Suga, J-Hope, Adora, "Hitman" Bang, Pdogg	Love Yourself: Tear	2018	
"Spine Breaker"	BTS	Rap Monster, Suga, Slow Rabbit, Supreme Boi, OWO, J-Hope, Song Chang-sik, Pdogg	Skool Luv Affair	2014	
"Spring Day" †	BTS	Rap Monster, Suga, Adora, "Hitman" Bang, Pdogg, Peter Ibsen, Arlissa Ruppert	You Never Walk Alone; Proof	2017	
"Spring Day" (Brit Rock Remix) #	BTS	RM, Suga, Pdogg, Adora, "Hitman" Bang, Arlissa Ruppert, Peter Ibsen	Non-album single	2018	
"Spring Day" (Japanese ver.)	BTS	RM, Suga, "Hitman" Bang, Peter Ibsen, Pdogg, Adora, Arlissa Ruppert	Face Yourself	2018	
"Stay"	BTS	RM, Arston, Jungkook, Jin	Be	2020	
"Still Life" †	RM feat. Anderson .Paak	RM, Ninos Hanna, Emil Schmidt, Adam Kulling, Ghstloop	Indigo	2022	
"Strange" (이상하지 않은가)	Agust D feat. RM	RM, Agust D, El Capitxn, Ghstloop	D-2	2020	
"Stop the Rain" †	Tablo feat. RM	RM, Tablo, Anthony Pavel, William Joseph Leong	Non-album single	2025	
"Swim"	BTS	RM, James Essein, Sean Foreman, Tyler Spry, Jamison Baken, Ryan Tedder, Kirsten Spencer, Derrick Milano, Pdogg	Arirang	2026	
"Take Two"†	BTS	RM, Suga, El Capitxn, Gabriel Brandes, Matt Thomson, Max Lynedoch Graham, J-Hope, Nois Upgrader	Non-album single	2023	
"Telepathy"	BTS	RM, Suga, Jungkook, El Capitxn, Hiss Noise	Be	2020	
"The Planet"	BTS	RM, Haein Lee, Cho Yun-Kyoung, Pdogg, Youngs Krysta Marie, Ross Julia Allyn, Thomson Matthew Charles, Graham Max Lynedoch, Gabriel Brandes, Michel "Lindgren" Schulz, Hilda Stenmalm, Melanie Fontana, Bard Mathias Bonsaksen	Non-album single	2023	
"The Stars"	BTS	Rap Monster, Suga, KM-MARKIT, J-Hope, Pdogg	Wake Up	2014	
"The Truth Untold"	BTS	RM, Steve Aoki, Roland Spreckley, Jake Torrey, Noah Conrad, Annika Wells, Slow Rabbit	Love Yourself: Tear	2018	
"Throw Away" ‡ (버려)	Rap Monster	Rap Monster	RM	2015	
"They Don't Know 'Bout Us"	BTS	RM, Jimin, Suga, J-Hope, Pdogg, Ghstloop, Ari Starrace, Rug, Kurtis Wells	Arirang	2026	
"Timeless"	Tiger JK feat. RM of BTS	RM, Tiger JK	Drunken Tiger X: Rebirth of Tiger JK	2018	
"Tokyo" ‡	RM	RM	mono.	2018	
"Tonight" #	Jin	RM, Slow Rabbit, Jin, Hiss Noise	Non-album single	2019	
"Too Much" ‡	Rap Monster	Rap Monster	Non-album single	2014	
"Tomorrow"	BTS	Rap Monster, Suga, Slow Rabbit, J-Hope	Skool Luv Affair	2014	
"Trivia 承: Love"	BTS	RM, Slow Rabbit, Hiss noise	Love Yourself: Answer	2018	
"Two! Three! (Still Wishing For Better Days)"	BTS	Rap Monster, Suga, Slow Rabbit, Pdogg, "Hitman" Bang, J-Hope	Wings	2016	
"U"	Primary feat. Kwon Jin-ah, Rap Monster	Rap Monster, Woo Hyo Eun	2-1	2015	
"Ugh!"	BTS	RM, Suga, Supreme Boi, J-Hope, Hiss Noise, Icecream Drum	Map of the Soul: 7	2020	
"Uhgood" ‡	RM	RM	mono.	2018	
"Voice" ‡ (목소리)	Rap Monster	Rap Monster	RM	2015	
"Wake Up"	BTS	Rap Monster, Suga, Swing-O, J-Hope, KM-MARKIT	Wake Up	2014	
"Waste It on Me" †	Steve Aoki	RM, Steve Aoki, Sean Foreman, Ryan Ogren, Nate Cyphert, Michael Gazzo, Jeff Halavacs	Neon Future III	2018	
"War of Hormone" †	BTS	Rap Monster, Suga, Supreme Boi, J-Hope, Pdogg	Dark & Wild	2014	
"We Are Bulletproof Pt. 2" †	BTS	Rap Monster, Suga, Supreme Boi, "Hitman" Bang, Pdogg	2 Cool 4 Skool	2013	
"We Are Bulletproof: The Eternal"	BTS	RM, Suga, J-Hope, Alexander Magnus Karlsson, Antonina Armato, Ellen Berg, Cazzi Opeia, Alexei Viktorovitch, DJ Swivel, Candace Nicole Sosa, Audien, Amelia Kate Woodward Toomey, Elohim, Etta Zelmani, Gusten Dahlqvist, Frances, Henrik Barman Michelsen, Wille Erik Hugo Tannergård, July Jones	Map of the Soul: 7	2020	
"We On"	BTS	Rap Monster, Suga, Pdogg, J-Hope	O!RUL8,2?	2013	
"Whalien 52"	BTS	Rap Monster, Suga, Slow Rabbit, J-Hope, "Hitman" Bang, Pdogg, Brother Su	The Most Beautiful Moment in Life, Pt. 2	2015	
"Where Did You Come From?"	BTS	Rap Monster, Suga, Kwon Dae Hee, Cream, J-Hope	Skool Luv Affair	2014	
"Wild Flower" †	RM feat. Youjeen	RM, Docskim	Indigo	2022	
"Winter Bear" #	V	RM, V, Adora, Hiss Noise	Non-album single	2019	
"Winter Flower"	Younha feat. RM	RM, Eden, Younha	Unstable Mindset	2020	
"Wishing on a Star"	BTS	Rap Monster, Suga, J-Hope, Matt Cab, William Ernest Weeks, Daisuke	Youth	2016	
"Yet to Come (The Most Beautiful Moment)" †	BTS	RM, Suga, Pdogg, MAX, Dan Gleyzer, J-Hope	Proof	2022	
"Yun"	RM feat. Erykah Badu	RM, Logikal J, Ghstloop	Indigo	2022	

== See also ==
- RM discography
