= Map of the Soul Tour =

2020 cancelled concert tour by BTS

BTS Map of the Soul Tour
- Cancelled tour by BTS
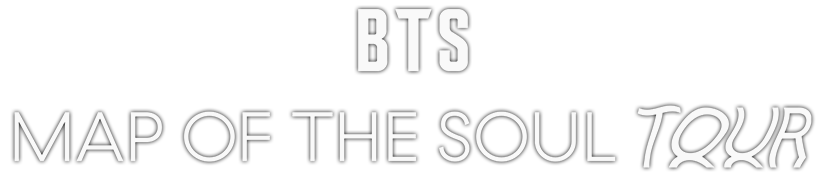
- Location: Asia; North America; Europe
- Associated albums: Map of the Soul: Persona; Map of the Soul: 7
- Start date: April 11, 2020 (scheduled)
- End date: September 2, 2020 (scheduled)
- No. of shows: 41 (all cancelled)

BTS Map of the Soul Tour was a cancelled worldwide concert tour headlined by South Korean boy band BTS to promote their Map of the Soul album series, including their Map of the Soul: Persona EP and Map of the Soul: 7 studio album. The all-stadium tour was announced on January 22, 2020, and set to begin on April 11, 2020, at the Seoul Olympic Stadium in Seoul, South Korea until it was postponed due to the COVID-19 pandemic. A two-day online concert, titled BTS Map of the Soul ON:E, was held on October 10–11, 2020, in place of the postponed world tour; the event garnered 993,000 viewers from 191 countries and territories. The postponed world tour was cancelled on August 19, 2021, due to continued uncertain circumstances and concerns over COVID-19.

== Background ==
On January 21, 2020, BTS first announced 38 tour dates spanning Asia, North America, and Europe. The tour featured extended North American and European visits compared to previous tours due to popular demand. On February 27, 2020, the group cancelled all four shows in South Korea amid the ongoing COVID-19 pandemic. On March 26, 2020, all 18 North American shows were postponed as the COVID-19 pandemic continued to raise concerns. On April 28, 2020, BTS announced that the entire tour would be postponed due to the COVID-19 pandemic. On August 19, 2021, the group's label Big Hit Music announced through Weverse that the entire world tour was cancelled due to uncertain circumstances.

== Cancelled shows ==
List of cancelled concerts, showing date, city, country, venue, reason for cancellation and reference
Date	City	Country	Venue	Reason	Ref.
April 11, 2020	Seoul	South Korea	Seoul Olympic Stadium	Concerns over the COVID-19 pandemic and uncertain circumstances	
April 12, 2020	Seoul	South Korea	Seoul Olympic Stadium	Concerns over the COVID-19 pandemic and uncertain circumstances	
April 18, 2020	Seoul	South Korea	Seoul Olympic Stadium	Concerns over the COVID-19 pandemic and uncertain circumstances	
April 19, 2020	Seoul	South Korea	Seoul Olympic Stadium	Concerns over the COVID-19 pandemic and uncertain circumstances	
April 25, 2020	Santa Clara	United States	Levi's Stadium	Concerns over the COVID-19 pandemic and uncertain circumstances	
April 26, 2020	Santa Clara	United States	Levi's Stadium	Concerns over the COVID-19 pandemic and uncertain circumstances	
May 2, 2020	Pasadena	United States	Rose Bowl	Concerns over the COVID-19 pandemic and uncertain circumstances	
May 3, 2020	Pasadena	United States	Rose Bowl	Concerns over the COVID-19 pandemic and uncertain circumstances	
May 5, 2020	Pasadena	United States	Rose Bowl	Concerns over the COVID-19 pandemic and uncertain circumstances	
May 9, 2020	Dallas	United States	Cotton Bowl	Concerns over the COVID-19 pandemic and uncertain circumstances	
May 10, 2020	Dallas	United States	Cotton Bowl	Concerns over the COVID-19 pandemic and uncertain circumstances	
May 14, 2020	Orlando	United States	Camping World Stadium	Concerns over the COVID-19 pandemic and uncertain circumstances	
May 17, 2020	Atlanta	United States	Bobby Dodd Stadium	Concerns over the COVID-19 pandemic and uncertain circumstances	
May 23, 2020	East Rutherford	United States	MetLife Stadium	Concerns over the COVID-19 pandemic and uncertain circumstances	
May 24, 2020	East Rutherford	United States	MetLife Stadium	Concerns over the COVID-19 pandemic and uncertain circumstances	
May 27, 2020	Landover	United States	FedExField	Concerns over the COVID-19 pandemic and uncertain circumstances	
May 30, 2020	Toronto	Canada	Rogers Centre	Concerns over the COVID-19 pandemic and uncertain circumstances	
May 31, 2020	Toronto	Canada	Rogers Centre	Concerns over the COVID-19 pandemic and uncertain circumstances	
June 5, 2020	Chicago	United States	Soldier Field	Concerns over the COVID-19 pandemic and uncertain circumstances	
June 6, 2020	Chicago	United States	Soldier Field	Concerns over the COVID-19 pandemic and uncertain circumstances	
June 13, 2020	TBA	TBA	TBA	Concerns over the COVID-19 pandemic and uncertain circumstances	
June 14, 2020	TBA	TBA	TBA	Concerns over the COVID-19 pandemic and uncertain circumstances	
June 28, 2020	Fukuoka	Japan	Fukuoka PayPay Dome	Concerns over the COVID-19 pandemic and uncertain circumstances	
June 29, 2020	Fukuoka	Japan	Fukuoka PayPay Dome	Concerns over the COVID-19 pandemic and uncertain circumstances	
July 3, 2020	London	England	Twickenham Stadium	Concerns over the COVID-19 pandemic and uncertain circumstances	
July 4, 2020	London	England	Twickenham Stadium	Concerns over the COVID-19 pandemic and uncertain circumstances	
July 8, 2020	Rotterdam	Netherlands	De Kuip	Concerns over the COVID-19 pandemic and uncertain circumstances	
July 11, 2020	Berlin	Germany	Olympiastadion	Concerns over the COVID-19 pandemic and uncertain circumstances	
July 12, 2020	Berlin	Germany	Olympiastadion	Concerns over the COVID-19 pandemic and uncertain circumstances	
July 17, 2020	Barcelona	Spain	Estadi Olímpic Lluís Companys	Concerns over the COVID-19 pandemic and uncertain circumstances	
July 18, 2020	Barcelona	Spain	Estadi Olímpic Lluís Companys	Concerns over the COVID-19 pandemic and uncertain circumstances	
July 23, 2020	Osaka	Japan	Kyocera Dome Osaka	Concerns over the COVID-19 pandemic and uncertain circumstances	
July 25, 2020	Osaka	Japan	Kyocera Dome Osaka	Concerns over the COVID-19 pandemic and uncertain circumstances	
July 26, 2020	Osaka	Japan	Kyocera Dome Osaka	Concerns over the COVID-19 pandemic and uncertain circumstances	
July 30, 2020	Osaka	Japan	Kyocera Dome Osaka	Concerns over the COVID-19 pandemic and uncertain circumstances	
August 1, 2020	Osaka	Japan	Kyocera Dome Osaka	Concerns over the COVID-19 pandemic and uncertain circumstances	
August 2, 2020	Osaka	Japan	Kyocera Dome Osaka	Concerns over the COVID-19 pandemic and uncertain circumstances	
August 7, 2020	Saitama	Japan	MetLife Dome	Concerns over the COVID-19 pandemic and uncertain circumstances	
August 8, 2020	Saitama	Japan	MetLife Dome	Concerns over the COVID-19 pandemic and uncertain circumstances	
September 1, 2020	Tokyo	Japan	Tokyo Dome		
September 2, 2020	Tokyo	Japan	Tokyo Dome		

== Map of the Soul ON:E ==
BTS Map of the Soul ON:E
- Virtual concert by BTS
- Associated album: Map of the Soul: Persona; Map of the Soul: 7
- Date: October 10-11, 2020
- Duration: 150 minute
- No. of shows: 2
- Attendance: 993,000
- Box office: $44,000,000

BTS concert chronology
- BTS World Tour Love Yourself: Speak Yourself (2019); BTS Map of the Soul ON:E (2020); Permission to Dance on Stage (2021–2022)

BTS Map of the Soul ON:E was a two-day pay-per-view online concert headlined by BTS to promote their Map of the Soul album series, including their Map of the Soul: Persona EP and Map of the Soul: 7 studio album, in place of the postponed Map of the Soul World Tour. The concert was broadcast live from the KSPO Dome in Seoul on October 10–11, 2020. Initially intended to have both a limited number of in-person tickets with a simultaneous online livestream, Big Hit Entertainment later cancelled the offline portion of the concert due to tightened COVID-19 pandemic government restrictions. The concert featured slightly different set lists each day, and production costs were an estimated eight times higher than those of their previous online show, BangBangCon: The Live. In total, the concert garnered 993,000 viewers from 191 countries and territories.

=== Synopsis and production ===
The 150-minute show began with "On" and focused on songs from BTS' most recent studio album, Map of the Soul: 7, with its production heavily utilizing elements of augmented and extended reality. Rappers Suga, RM, and J-Hope performed the hip-hop track "Ugh!" together; Jin, Jungkook, V, and Jimin performed the soft-pop ballad "00:00" as a quartet. RM, Suga, Jimin, Jungkook, Jin, V, and J-Hope performed the solo tracks "Persona", "Shadow", "Filter", "My Time", "Inner Child", "Moon", and "Ego", respectively. Dark screens featured visuals resembling underwater scenery at the sides of the stage as the group performed "Black Swan", while with "Dope," the screen behind the stage created the illusion that the members were dancing on an elevator as it shot upward. The band also performed "Dionysus" and their singles "DNA", "Boy With Luv", and "No More Dream" as part of the 23-song set list. The encore began with two songs that were different for each show—"Butterfly" and "Run" for the first show and "Spring Day" and "Idol" for the second—and ended with "Dynamite" and "We Are Bulletproof: The Eternal".

=== Set lists ===
==== Day 1 ====
1. "On"
2. "N.O"
3. "We Are Bulletproof Pt.2"
4. "Intro: Persona"
5. "Boy in Luv"
6. "Dionysus"
7. "Interlude: Shadow"
8. "Black Swan"
9. "Ugh!"
10. "00:00"
11. "My Time"
12. "Filter"
13. "Moon"
14. "Inner Child"
15. "Outro: Ego"
16. "Boy with Luv"
17. "DNA"
18. "Dope"
19. "No More Dream"

Encore

20. "Butterfly"
21. "Run"
22. "Dynamite"
23. "We Are Bulletproof: The Eternal"

==== Day 2 ====
1. "On"
2. "N.O"
3. "We Are Bulletproof Pt.2"
4. "Intro: Persona"
5. "Boy in Luv"
6. "Dionysus"
7. "Interlude: Shadow"
8. "Black Swan"
9. "Ugh!"
10. "00:00"
11. "My Time"
12. "Filter"
13. "Moon"
14. "Inner Child"
15. "Outro: Ego"
16. "Boy with Luv"
17. "DNA"
18. "Dope"
19. "No More Dream"

Encore

20. "Spring Day"
21. "Idol"
22. "Dynamite"
23. "We Are Bulletproof: The Eternal"
