= Map of the Soul =

Map of the Soul may refer to:

- Map of the Soul: Persona, a 2019 album by BTS
- Map of the Soul: 7, a 2020 album by BTS
- Map of the Soul: 7 – The Journey, a 2020 Japanese version album of Map of the Soul: 7 by BTS
- Map of the Soul Tour, a cancelled worldwide concert tour by BTS
