= The Planet (song) =

Single by BTS
- Language: Korean; English
- Released: May 12, 2023
- Recorded: 2022
- Genre: Dance
- Length: 2:58
- Label: BigHit
- Songwriters: Pdogg, Melanie Joy Fontana; Michel “Lindgren” Schulz; RM; Krysta Youngs; Julia Ross; Gabriel Brandes; Cho Yun-kyoung; Matt Thomson; Max Lynedoch Graham; Bard Mathias Bonsaksen; Hilda Stenmalm; Lee Haein
- Producer: pdogg

BTS singles chronology
"Bad Decisions" (2022)	"The Planet" (2023)	"Take Two" (2023)

"The Planet" is the original soundtrack for the 3D animated superhero series Bastions. It was released on May 12, 2023 and features BTS. "The Planet" was recorded by the whole group before going on hiatus to complete military service and venture on solo careers.

== Commercial performance ==
As of May 13, "The Planet" reached #1 on the iTunes Top Songs charts in 67 different regions."The Planet" debuted at #1 on the Oricon's daily digital singles chart. Additionally, they reached #19 on the Spotify's Global Top Songs chart.

== Awards ==
Award and Nomination for "The Planet"
Award Show	Year	Category	Result	Ref.
MAMA Awards	2023	Best OST	Won	
MAMA Awards	2023	Song of The Year	Longlisted	

== Charts ==
Weekly chart performance
Chart (2023)	Peak position
Japan (Billboard)	40
Global 200 (Billboard)	62
US Digital Song Sales (Billboard)	6
US World Digital Song Sales (Billboard)	1
