= Bastions (TV series) =

2023 South Korean television series

- Hangul: 베스티언즈
- RR: Beseutieonjeu
- MR: Pesŭt'iŏnjŭ
- Genre: Superhero; K-pop
- Opening theme: " The Planet" by BTS
- Country of origin: South Korea
- Original language: Korean

Production
- Production companies: Thymos Media; Navel

Original release
- Network: SBS TV
- Release: May 14, 2023
- Network: Crunchyroll (streaming) (Note: In select regions.)

Bastions (Korean: 베스티언즈) is a South Korean animated television series airing on SBS TV. The series fuses superhero fiction and K-Pop.

== Premise ==
A group of young idols live in a world where superpowers are an everyday thing. The group struggles to learn how to use their powers to become superheroes and save the planet from villains trying to pollute the environment.

== Characters ==
- Digger (voiced Kim Han Shin / 김한신)
- Almon (voiced Kim Sin Woo / 김신우)
- JJ (voiced Kim Min Joo / 김민주)
- Miki (voiced Kim Yeon Woo / 김연우)
- Mitch (voiced Lee Kyung Tae / 이경태)
- Chairman Yang (voiced Si Young Joon / 시영준)
- Joony (voiced Yoon Ah Young / 윤아영)

== Production ==
In April 2023, a new animated series produced for SBS TV was first announced, featuring a new single from boy group BTS. The series was produced by Thymos Media and Navel.

=== Music ===
BTS provided the music for "The Planet", which serves as the opening theme for the show. "The Planet" was recorded by the whole group before going on hiatus to complete military service and venture on solo careers. Additional contributors to the soundtrack include Le Sserafim, Heize, AleXa, and Brave Girls, who provide one of their first songs since leaving Brave Entertainment.

== Release ==
Bastions first aired on SBS TV in South Korea on May 14, 2023, at 7:30 am. Despite this the show can be seen on the anime streaming service Crunchyroll (Note: A Sony-owned streaming service formerly a part of WarnerMedia (now known as Warner Bros. Discovery).) a day prior in some regions.
