= Bad Decisions (Benny Blanco, BTS and Snoop Dogg song) =

2022 single by Benny Blanco, BTS and Snoop Dogg

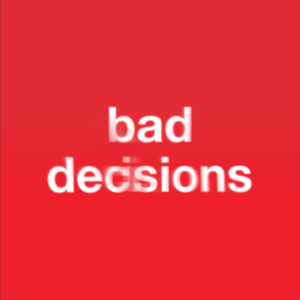

Single by Benny Blanco, BTS and Snoop Dogg
- Released: August 5, 2022
- Genre: Dance
- Length: 2:53
- Label: Interscope; Friends Keep Secrets; Joytime Collective
- Songwriters: Benjamin Levin; Calvin Broadus; Michael Posner; Blake Slatkin; Magnus Høiberg
- Producers: Benny Blanco; Blake Slatkin; Cashmere Cat

Benny Blanco singles chronology
"Unlearn" (2021)	"Bad Decisions" (2022)	"Lace It" (2023)

BTS singles chronology
"Yet to Come (The Most Beautiful Moment)" (2022)	"Bad Decisions" (2022)	"The Planet" (2023)

Snoop Dogg singles chronology
"From the D 2 the LBC" (2022)	"Bad Decisions" (2022)	"Satellite" (2023)

Music video
- "Bad Decisions" on YouTube

"Bad Decisions" is a song by American record producer Benny Blanco, South Korean boy band BTS, and American rapper Snoop Dogg. It was released through Interscope Records, Friends Keep Secrets, and Joytime Collective as a single on August 5, 2022. The song was described as "a euphoric, flirty dance track" that sees the BTS members and Snoop talking about a loved one they want to spend time with.

== Background and release ==
In an interview with The A.V. Club in March 2022, Snoop Dogg revealed that he had a collaboration with BTS. In April 2022, while backstage at American Song Contest, a show in which he is a host, Snoop Dogg informed a magazine, Buzz, of the completion of his contributions to the song. On July 20, 2022, Benny Blanco unveiled a schedule with the release dates of the song's music videos on his Twitter page. On the same day, BTS released comedic videos promoting the song starring themselves and Blanco. On August 5, BTS's YouTube channel also released a lyric video and recording sketch. This is the second time that Blanco and BTS have worked with. He incorporated remixes of the band's songs "Life Goes On," "Blood Sweat and Tears," and "Fake Love" earlier that year.

== Music and lyrics ==
Bad Decisions was co-produced by Blanco, Blake Slatkin, Cashmere Cat and Mike Posner on the guitar, who received a writing crediting as well. It was described as a dance track with a catchy tempo and lyrics that express genuine feelings for the one you love in a cool way on a hot summer day. Internet personality MrBeast pushed one random key on a keyboard and for this was given credit for hi-hat on the song.

== Commercial performance ==
In the United States, "Bad Decisions" debuted at number 10 on the Billboard Hot 100 with 10.1 million streams, 3.1 million radio plays, and 66,000 sales (45,000 digital downloads, 16,000 CDs, and 5,000 cassettes) in its first week. The track became BTS' tenth and Blanco's second (after "Eastside" with Halsey and Khalid at number nine in 2019) top-10 entry respectively on the Hot 100. BTS is the first South Korean artist to have at least ten Hot 100 top-10s. "Bad Decisions" also debuted atop the component Digital Song Sales chart, marking BTS' 11th number one—the most among duos or groups; Snoop Dogg's fifth; and Blanco's first, and at number 28 on Streaming Songs.

== Music video ==
Directed by Ben Sinclair, the official music video for "Bad Decisions" premiered on Blanco's YouTube channel alongside the release of the song on August 5, 2022.

The concept of the video is a countdown to a BTS concert, with Blanco acting as a superfan of the group. On the day of the event, he kisses his ticket and throws a finger heart at his wall of posters honoring BTS, while subsequent scenes show him dancing the choreography for "Dynamite" with his Army Bomb lightstick in hand, preparing a BTS-themed cake, and creating a heart-shaped collage of the group members, in anticipation of the concert. Blanco leaves home with the cake and drives to the venue, but accidentally ruins it on the way. He eventually arrives at the stadium only to find it empty. A janitor cleaning the premises then informs him that he has arrived a day early and locks him out.

== Track listing ==
- Cassette

A-side

1. "Bad Decisions" – 2:52

B-side

1. "Bad Decisions" (instrumental) – 2:52
- CD single
1. "Bad Decisions" – 2:52
2. "Bad Decisions" (instrumental) – 2:52
- Digital
1. "Bad Decisions" – 2:52
- Digital (acoustic)
1. "Bad Decisions" (acoustic) – 2:54
- Digital (instrumental)
1. "Bad Decisions" (instrumental) – 2:52

== Personnel ==
- Benny Blanco – backing vocals, songwriting, production, keyboards, instrumentation, programming, engineering
- BTS – lead vocals, songwriting
- Snoop Dogg – lead vocals, songwriting
- Blake Slatkin – backing vocals, guitar, production, keyboards, instrumentation, programming
- Cashmere Cat – backing vocals, production, keyboards, instrumentation, programming
- Mike Posner – backing vocals, guitar
- MrBeast – electronic hi-hat
- Pdogg – BTS vocal arrangement, BTS vocal recording
- Frank Vasquez – Snoop Dogg vocal recording
- Christopher Guitierrez – Snoop Dogg vocal recording
- Serban Ghenea – mix engineer
- Bryce Bordone – engineer

== Accolades ==
Awards and nominations for "Bad Decisions"
Award show	Year	Category	Result	Ref.
Clio Awards	2024	Music Marketing – Integrated Campaign (Brand and Artist Collaboration Integrated Campaign) for Hijinx Agency	Bronze	

== Charts ==
=== Weekly charts ===
Weekly chart performance
Chart (2022)	Peak position
Australia (ARIA)	31
Canada Hot 100 (Billboard)	31
Canada CHR/Top 40 (Billboard)	36
Finland Airplay (Radiosoittolista)	30
France (SNEP)	177
Germany (GfK)	89
Global 200 (Billboard)	6
Hungary (Rádiós Top 40)	40
Hungary (Single Top 40)	10
India International Singles (IMI)	4
Indonesia (Billboard)	14
Ireland (IRMA)	63
Japan Hot 100 (Billboard)	33
Japan Digital Singles (Oricon)	5
Lithuania (AGATA)	34
Malaysia International (RIM)	6
Mexico Airplay (Billboard)	33
New Zealand Hot Singles (RMNZ)	3
Philippines (Billboard)	8
Poland Airplay (ZPAV)	99
Portugal (AFP)	91
San Marino (SMRRTV Top 50)	7
Singapore (RIAS)	6
South Africa Streaming (TOSAC)	87
South Korea (Circle)	82
Sweden Heatseeker (Sverigetopplistan)	6
Switzerland (Schweizer Hitparade)	76
UK Singles (Official Charts)	53
US Billboard Hot 100	10
US Pop Airplay (Billboard)	26
Vietnam (Vietnam Hot 100)	4

=== Monthly charts ===
Monthly chart performance
Chart (2022)	Peak position
South Korea (Circle)	86

=== Year-end charts ===
2022 year-end chart performance
Chart (2022)	Position
US Digital Song Sales (Billboard)	26

== Certifications ==
Certifications
Region	Certification	Certified units/sales
Brazil (Pro-Música Brasil)	Platinum	40,000^{‡}
Canada (Music Canada)	Gold	40,000^{‡}
United States (RIAA)	Gold	500,000^{‡}
^{‡} Sales+streaming figures based on certification alone.

== Release history ==
Release history
Region	Date	Format	Version	Label	Ref.
Various	August 3, 2022	Digital download; streaming	Instrumental	Friends Keep Secrets; Interscope	
Various	August 4, 2022	Digital download; streaming	Acoustic	Friends Keep Secrets; Interscope	
Various	August 5, 2022	Digital download; streaming	Original	Friends Keep Secrets; Interscope	
Italy	August 5, 2022	Radio airplay	Original	Universal	
United States	August 5, 2022	Cassette single	Original	Friends Keep Secrets; Interscope	
United States	August 5, 2022	CD single	Original	Friends Keep Secrets; Interscope	
United States	August 16, 2022	Contemporary hit radio	Original	Friends Keep Secrets; Interscope	
