= Take Two (song) =

Single by BTS
- Language: Korean; English
- Released: June 9, 2023
- Length: 3:49
- Label: BigHit
- Songwriters: RM; J-Hope; Suga; El Capitxn; Gabriel Brandes; Matt Thomson; Max Lynedoch Graham; Nois Upgrader
- Producers: Suga; El Capitxn

BTS singles chronology
"The Planet" (2023)	"Take Two" (2023)	"Swim" (2026)

"Take Two" is a song by South Korean boy band BTS, released as a single on June 9, 2023, through BigHit Music. Its release is part of the band's 10th anniversary celebrations. The song was co-written by members RM and J-Hope, and produced by Suga.

== Background and release ==
The song was announced on May 31, 2023. BTS stated that the song shows their appreciation toward ARMY, their fanbase, as well as "their desire to always be together" with them. The title is intended to reflect "the group entering its second chapter". The song features vocals from all seven members of the band, despite Jin and J-Hope both serving their mandatory military service at the time of its release. On June 13, BTS released a performance video to commemorate the group's tenth anniversary.

== Commercial performance ==
"Take Two" debuted atop the Billboard Global 200 with 60.2 million streams and 64,000 downloads sold worldwide from June 9 to 15, making BTS the first act to have a new song debut at number one on the Global 200 every year since the chart's inception in 2020. It also debuted at number one on the Global Excl. U.S chart, with an accrued 54.3 million streams and 48,000 downloads in territories outside of the United States. The song debuted at number 14 on the South Korean Circle Digital Chart, and number 6 on the Billboard Japan Hot 100.

== Accolades ==
Awards and nominations for "Take Two"
Year	Organization	Award	Result	Ref.
2023	MAMA Awards	Best Vocal Performance – Group	Nominated	
2023	MAMA Awards	Song of the Year	Nominated	
2023	Circle Chart Music Awards	Global Streaming Song	Nominated	
2023	The Fact Music Awards	Best Music (Summer)	Won	

Music program awards
Program	Date	Ref.
M Countdown	June 22, 2023	
M Countdown	June 29, 2023	
M Countdown	July 6, 2023	

== Charts ==
=== Weekly charts ===
Weekly chart performance
Chart (2023)	Peak position
Australia (ARIA)	60
Bolivia (Billboard)	23
Canada Hot 100 (Billboard)	49
France (SNEP)	168
Global 200 (Billboard)	1
Greece (IFPI)	23
Hong Kong (Billboard)	19
Hungary (Single Top 40)	2
India International Singles (IMI)	1
Indonesia (Billboard)	7
Ireland (IRMA)	71
Japan Hot 100 (Billboard)	6
Japan Combined Singles (Oricon)	13
Lithuania (AGATA)	30
Malaysia (Billboard)	9
Malaysia International (RIM)	5
MENA (IFPI)	9
New Zealand Hot Singles (RMNZ)	4
Peru (Billboard)	15
Philippines (Billboard)	7
Portugal (AFP)	92
Singapore (RIAS)	3
South Korea (Circle)	11
Taiwan (Billboard)	12
UK Singles (Official Charts)	59
US Billboard Hot 100	48
US World Digital Song Sales (Billboard)	1
Vietnam (Vietnam Hot 100)	1

=== Monthly charts ===
Monthly chart performance
Chart (2023)	Position
South Korea (Circle)	28

=== Year-end chart ===
Year-end chart performance
Chart (2023)	Position
Japan Download (Billboard Japan)	63
South Korea (Circle)	189
US Digital Song Sales (Billboard)	62
