= 2019 Melon Music Awards =

Korean music award ceremony, 2019

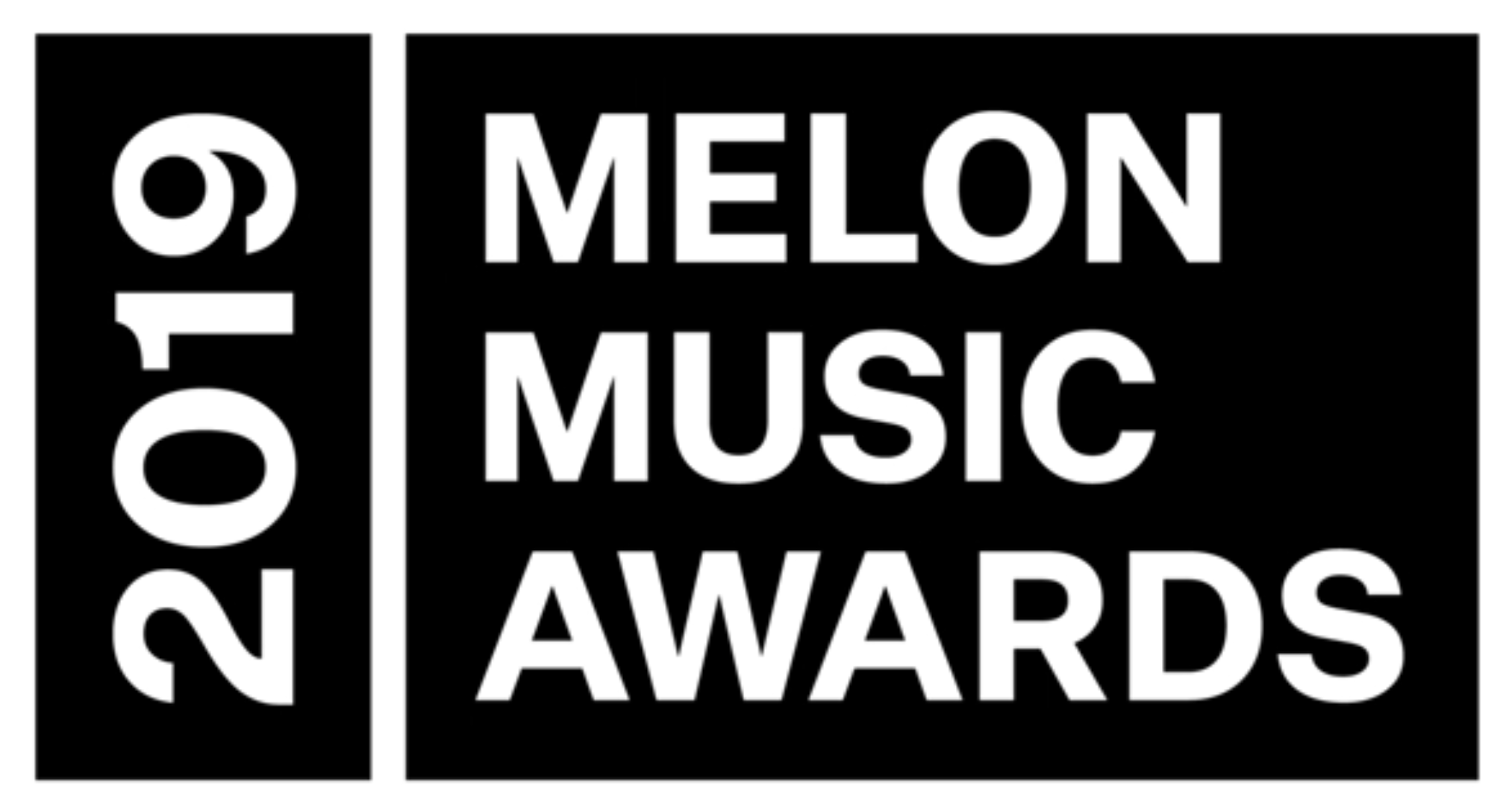
- Date: November 30, 2019
- Location: Gocheok Sky Dome, Seoul, South Korea
- Most awards: BTS (8)
- Most nominations: BTS (6)
- Website: www.melon.com/mma/index.htm

Television/radio coverage
- Network: JTBC2; JTBC4; 1theK; KakaoTV; Daum; Melon
- Runtime: 240 minutes

The 2019 Melon Music Awards ceremony, organized by Kakao M (a Kakao company) through its online music store Melon, took place on November 30, 2019 at the Gocheok Sky Dome in Seoul, South Korea. This is the eleventh ceremony in the show's history.

BTS took home all four most prestigious Daesang awards of the night.

== Judging criteria ==
Division	Online Voting	Digital Sales	Judge Score
Top 10 Artists	20%	80%	—
Main awards*	20%	60%	20%
Genre Awards**	30%	40%	30%
Popularity Awards***	60%	40%	—
Special Awards****	—	—	100%
*Artist of the Year, Album of the Year, Song of the Year, Best New Artist; **Rap/Hip Hop, R&B/Ballad, Rock, OST, Trot, Pop, Dance, Folk/Blue, Indie, Electronic, Hot Trend Award; ***Netizen Popularity Award, KaKao Hot Star Award; ****Record of the Year, Stage of the Year, Music Video Award, Song Writer Award, 1theK Performance Award

== Performers and presenters ==
The following individuals and groups, listed in order of appearance, presented awards or performed musical numbers.

=== Performances ===
Artist(s)	Song(s)	Segment
The Boyz	"D.D.D"	"Boyz in Wonderland"
Heize, Giriboy	"Falling Leaves are Beautiful" / "We Don't Talk Together"	"만추"
Giriboy, Yunhway, Han Yo-han, Justhis, Swings, Young B (Yanghongwon), Lil Tachi	"I'm Sick"	"IMJMWDP"
N.Flying	"Rooftop" / "Good Bam"	"The Music for Tomorrow"
AB6IX	"Breathe" / "Blind for Love"	"Love is Blindness"
TXT	"New Rules" / "9 and Three Quarters (Run Away)"	"School of Magic"
Hwasa, Mamamoo	"Twit" / "Gogobebe"	"Neon in the black"
Itzy	"Want It?" / "Dalla Dalla" / "Icy"	"The way I AM"
Jannabi	"Good Good Night" / "For Lovers Who Hesitate"	—N/a
Kang Daniel	"What Are You Up To" / "Touchin'"	"Touch My Color":
Chungha	"Gotta Go" / "Snapping"	"Co-existing"
BTS	"Intro: Persona" / "Boy in Luv" / "Boy With Luv" / "Mikrokosmos" / "Dionysus" / Member dance solos (remixes) (Note: "No More Dream" (V) + "Danger" (Jin) + "I Need U" (Jimin) + "Fire" (Suga) + "Save Me" (Jungkook) + "Fake Love" (J-Hope) + "Dionysus" (RM))	"Map of the Soul: The Show"

=== Presenters ===
Name(s)	Notes
Park Seo-joon	Opening, Presenter for Artist of the Year Award
Lee Hyun-woo	Presenter for Top 10 Artists (BTS and Jannabi)
Lee Jae-wook & Byung Jung Ha	Presenter for Best New Artist Awards
Jang Sung Kyu	Presenter for Netizen Popularity Award
Kim So-hyun & Jung Ga-ram, Na Ha-eun	Presenter for Best Dance Awards
Han Ji-hye & Kim Do Wan	Presenter for Top 10 Artists (Mamamoo and Heize)
Kwak Dong-yeon & Jin Ki-joo	Presenter for Best OST & Best Music Video Award
Choi Woo-shik	Presenter for Record of the Year (Daesang)
Kim Young-dae & Hong Soo-hyun	Presenter for Top 10 Artists (Chungha and MC the Max)
Kim Jae-wook	Presenter for Kakao Hot Star
Kim Yeong-cheol & Oh Ah Yeon	Presenter for Hot Trend Award
Yoo Su Bin & Hong Hyun Hee	Presenter for 1theK Performance Award
Lee Joo-yeon & Byeon Woo-seok	Presenter for Best Rock & Best R&B/Soul Award
Lee Je-hoon	Presenter for Song of the Year (Daesang)
Im Soo-jung	Presenter for Album of the Year (Daesang)
Park Seo-joon	Presenter for Artist of the Year (Daesang)

== Winners and nominees ==
Only artists who released music between December 1, 2018 and November 13, 2019 were eligible, and the nominees were selected by calculating the number of downloads, streams, and weekly Melon Popularity Award votes achieved by each artist. Voting for Top 10 Artists took place on the Melon Music website from October 30 through November 13, 2019. Voting for Category awards took place from November 14 through November 29, 2019.

Winners are listed first and highlighted in boldface, and indicated with a double dagger (‡).

=== Main awards ===
Top 10 Artists (Bonsang)	Song of the Year (Daesang)
**Bolbbalgan4**‡; **BTS**‡; **Exo**‡; **Jang Beom-june**‡; **Jannabi**‡; **Mamamoo**‡; **MC the Max**‡; **Taeyeon**‡; **Heize**‡; **Chungha**‡	**BTS – "Boy With Luv"**‡; Ben – "180°"; Chungha – "Gotta Go"; Jannabi – "For Lovers Who Hesitate"; N.Flying – "Rooftop"
Artist of the Year (Daesang)	Album of the Year (Daesang)
**BTS**‡; Chungha; Exo; Taeyeon; Jannabi	**BTS – Map of the Soul: Persona**‡; Bolbbalgan4 – Puberty Book I Bom; Jang Beom-june – Jang Beom June 3rd; Jannabi – Legend; MC the Max – Circular
Record of the Year (Daesang)	Best New Artist
**BTS**‡	**TXT**‡; **Itzy**‡; Cherry Bullet; Hynn; X1
Best Dance Award (Male)	Best Dance Award (Female)
**BTS – "Boy With Luv"**‡; Exo – "Love Shot"; Minhyun (NU'EST) – "Universe"; Seventeen – "Home"; Winner – "Millions"	**Chungha – "Gotta Go"**‡; Itzy – "Dalla Dalla"; GFriend – "Sunrise"; Mamamoo – "Gogobebe"; Twice – "Fancy"
Best Rap/Hip Hop Award	Best R&B/Soul Award
**Epik High – "Lovedrunk" (feat. Crush)**‡; Blackpink – "Kill This Love"; Changmo, Hash Swan, Ash Island, Kim Hyo Eun – "Band"; Jvcki Wai, Young B, Osshun Gum, Han Yo Han – "DDING"; Lil Tachi and Hotchkiss – "Snow" (Prod. Giriboy)	**Heize – "We Don't Talk Together" (feat. Giriboy) (Prod. Suga)**‡; Baek Yerin – "Maybe It's Not Our Fault"; Crush – "Nappa"; Park Bom – "Spring" (feat. Sandara Park); Urban Zakapa – "Seoul Night" (feat. Beenzino)
Best Indie Award	Best Rock Award
**MeloMance – "You&I"**‡; HAEUN and YOSEP – "Girlfriend"; OVAN – "Happiness"; MAKTUB – "To You My Light" (Feat. Lee Raon); Woody – "Fire up"	**N.Flying – "Rooftop"**‡; AKMU – "Freedom"; Day6 – "Days Gone By"; Jang Beom June – "Karaoke"; Park Hyo Shin – "Lover"
Best Trot Award	Best OST Award
**Hong Jin Young – "Love Tonight"**‡; Hong Ja – "I'm Here"; Jang Yoon Jung – "Train to Mokpo"; Jung Da Kyung – "Traffic Light of Love"; Song Ga In – "Nameless Actress"	**Gummy – "Remember Me(Hotel del Luna)"**‡; Ha Jin – "We All Lie"(Sky Castle); Jang Beom June – "Your Shampoo Scent in the Flowers" (Be Melodramatic); Naomi Scott – "Speechless" (Aladdin); Post Malone and Swae Lee – "Sunflower" (Spider-Man: Into the Spider-Verse)
Best Pop Award	Best Ballad Award
**Billie Eilish – "Bad Guy"**‡; Ariana Grande – "7 Rings"; Ed Sheeran and Justin Bieber – "I Don't Care"; Lauv and Troye Sivan – "I'm So Tired..."; Shawn Mendes and Camila Cabello – "Señorita"	**Taeyeon – "Four Seasons"**‡; Ben – "180°"; Kassy – "The day was beautiful"; MC the Max – "After You've Gone"; Paul Kim – "Traffic Light"
Netizen Popularity Awards	Hot Trend Award
**BTS**‡; Exo; Jannabi; Mamamoo; Twice; Lee Sora; Park Hyo Shin; Red Velvet; Taeyeon; Winner	**AB6IX**‡; Ha Sung Woon; Jeon Somi; Kang Daniel; Kim Jae Hwan

=== Other awards ===
Award	Winner(s)
**Best Music Video Award**	Kang Daniel – "What Are You Up To"
**Stage of the Year**	Seventeen
**Best Songwriter Award**	Pdogg
**Kakao Hot Star**	BTS
**1theK Performance Award**	The Boyz
