= Make It Right (BTS song) =

2019 single by BTS

- Lauv remix cover

Single by BTS featuring Lauv

from the EP Map of the Soul: Persona
- Language: Korean; English
- Released: October 18, 2019
- Genre: R&B; K-pop
- Length: 3:46
- Label: Big Hit
- Songwriters: Fred Gibson; Ed Sheeran; Benjy Gibson; Jo Hill; RM; Suga; J-Hope
- Producer: Fred Again

BTS singles chronology
"Lights" (2019)	"Make It Right" (2019)	"Black Swan" (2020)

Lauv singles chronology
"Sims" (2019)	"Make It Right" (2019)	"Mean It" (2019)

Music videos
- "Make It Right" (feat. Lauv) on YouTube "Make It Right (Vertical ver.)" on YouTube

"Make It Right" is a song by South Korean boy band BTS. It was released digitally on April 12, 2019, as part of the extended play Map of the Soul: Persona. It was remixed and re-released, featuring American singer Lauv, as the second single from the EP on October 18, 2019.

== Background and release ==
The song was first teased by Suga on Twitter, showing an image of a track and tagging Ed Sheeran with "This is for you." On April 11, a day before release, it was announced as the song Suga had teased in prior months. The title of the song appeared to recount Jin's monologue in the 2017 Love Yourself Highlight Reel during the band's Love Yourself era.

The album version of the song was released digitally on April 12, 2019. The remixed version was teased on the group's and Lauv's social media platforms and officially released on October 18, 2019.

== Promotion ==
The song was promoted on M Countdown April 19, 2019. BTS also performed the original version of the song on The Late Show with Stephen Colbert in May 2019. Additionally, BTS performed the song on iHeart Radio Jingle Ball and in New York City's Times Square on Dick Clark’s New Year’s Rockin’ Eve With Ryan Seacrest.

== Composition and lyrics ==
"Make It Right" has been described as a falsetto-vocal heavy contemporary R&B track that is, "sung with a breathy, close-miked intensity that gives the curious illusion of intimacy." It uses a looped horn throughout the song, with Rolling Stone comparing it to Amerie's "1 Thing" or Mario's "Let Me Love You" echoing sounds from the 2000s. It is backed with synthesizers, and the lyrics talk about the wish to make the world better and improve relationships. It also speaks about their biggest accomplishments and that without their fans it would feel empty. Newsweek said although the topic of the song can be heavy, the instrumental is light. In the remixed version, Lauv replaces the Korean-language first verse with his own lyrics.

== Reception ==
The New York Times said about the track: "It has some of Ed Sheeran's signature soft-soul gestures, but BTS renders [it] with complexity," while Jae-ha Kim from the Chicago Tribune called it "hopeful and optimistic".

== Credits and personnel ==
Credits are adapted from the liner notes of Map of the Soul: Persona and Apple Music.

- BTS – vocals
  - RM – vocals, songwriting, rap arrangement, recording engineer
  - Suga – vocals, songwriting
  - J-Hope – vocals, songwriting
  - Jungkook – vocals, chorus
  - V – vocals
  - Jimin – vocals
  - Jin – vocals
- Lauv – vocals, songwriting (remix version)
- Fred Again – producing, songwriting, drums, keyboard, synthesizer, programming
- Ed Sheeran – songwriting
- Benjy Gibson – songwriting
- Jo Hill – songwriting
- Pdogg – vocal arrangement, rap arrangement, recording engineer
- Hiss Noise – recording engineer, digital engineer
- El Capitxn – digital engineer

== Charts ==
=== Original version ===
Chart (2019)	Peak position
Australia (ARIA)	89
Canada Hot 100 (Billboard)	72
Czech Republic Singles Digital (ČNS IFPI)	99
Hungary (Single Top 40)	15
Ireland (IRMA)	59
Lithuania (AGATA)	16
Japan (Japan Hot 100)	54
Malaysia (RIM)	5
New Zealand Hot Singles (RMNZ)	5
Scottish Singles Sales (Official Charts)	28
Slovakia Singles Digital (ČNS IFPI)	47
South Korea (Gaon)	10
South Korea (K-pop Hot 100)	3
UK Singles (Official Charts)	68
UK Indie (Official Charts)	9
US Billboard Hot 100	95
US Rolling Stone Top 100	90

=== Remix version ===
Chart (2019)	Peak position
Australia (ARIA)	53
Canada Hot 100 (Billboard)	65
Estonia (Eesti Ekspress)	35
Hungary (Single Top 40)	11
Lithuania (AGATA)	28
Malaysia (RIM)	10
New Zealand Hot Singles (RMNZ)	3
Singapore (RIAS)	8
South Korea (Gaon)	80
Sweden Heatseeker (Sverigetopplistan)	9
US Billboard Hot 100	76
US Pop Airplay (Billboard)	24

== Certifications ==
Region	Certification	Certified units/sales
Australia (ARIA)	Gold	35,000^{‡}
Streaming
Japan (RIAJ)	Gold	50,000,000^{†}
^{‡} Sales+streaming figures based on certification alone.^{†} Streaming-only figures based on certification alone.
