= Home (BTS song) =

Song by BTS

Song by BTS

from the EP Map of the Soul: Persona
- Language: Korean
- Released: April 12, 2019
- Genre: Pop; R&B
- Length: 4:00
- Label: Big Hit
- Songwriters: Pdogg; RM; Lauren Dyson; Tushar Apte; Suga; J-Hope; Krysta Youngs; Julia Ross; Bobby Chung; Song Jae-kyung; Adora
- Producer: Pdogg

"Home" (stylized in all caps) is a song by South Korean boy band BTS. It was released digitally on April 12, 2019, as part of the extended play Map of the Soul: Persona.

== Background and release ==
The song was released digitally on April 12, 2019.

== Composition and lyrics ==
"Home" is a pop and R&B track with lyrics that talk about how although they have become successful and are now able to afford the things that they wanted before success, they find themselves unsatisfied with the luxuries. In the song, Jimin sings, "“The more I fill up the emptier I get / The more I’m with people the more I feel alone.” By the end of the song, they come into the presence of their lover and find comfort at last. The song links to their prior song "Magic Shop" from Love Yourself: Tear, mirroring lines such as “you got me / I got you” and “so show me / I’ll show you”.

During a press conference, J-Hope expanded on the meaning of the song, saying, "The song talks about the ‘home’, which is where the fans are and where our hearts are, where we want to come back to when things are hard and we feel lonely. We get strength from the people who love us and wait for us.”

== Reception ==
Joshua Minsoo Kim from Pitchfork called the song a "standout track [that] projects an image of carefree luxury," and Noah Yoo from the same agency called the song the album's highlight, with dynamic flows and the interplay between the members effortless. Neil Z. Yeung from AllMusic called it smooth and soulful, and Kelly Wynne from Newsweek called it well-rounded and an "interesting mix between rap and slow pop."

== Personnel ==
Personnel adapted from the CD liner notes of Map of the Soul: Persona.

- BTS – primary vocals
- Pdogg – songwriting, producing, keyboard, synthesizer, vocal arrangement, rap arrangement, recording engineer
- RM – songwriting, rap arrangement, recording engineer
- Lauren Dyson – songwriting
- Tushar Apte – songwriting
- Suga – songwriting
- J-Hope – songwriting
- Krysta Youngs – songwriting
- Julia Ross – songwriting
- Jeong Bobby – songwriting
- Song Jae-kyeong – songwriting
- Adora – songwriting, chorus, recording engineer, digital editing
- Jungkook – chorus
- Hiss Noise – recording engineer
- Jeong Woo-yeong – digital editing

== Charts ==
Chart (2019)	Peak position
Australia (ARIA)	99
Canada Hot 100 (Billboard)	75
Hungary (Single Top 40)	26
Japan (Japan Hot 100)	69
Lithuania (AGATA)	19
Malaysia (RIM)	6
New Zealand Hot Singles (RMNZ)	10
Slovakia Singles Digital (ČNS IFPI)	94
South Korea (Gaon)	16
South Korea (Billboard K-pop Hot 100)	4
UK Indie (Official Charts)	12
US Bubbling Under Hot 100 (Billboard)	1
