= Intro: Persona =

Song by BTS

"Persona"

Song by BTS

from the EP Map of the Soul: Persona
- Language: Korean
- Released: April 12, 2019
- Genre: Hip hop; trap; rap rock
- Length: 2:54
- Label: Big Hit
- Songwriters: Hiss Noise; RM; Pdogg
- Producer: Hiss Noise

Music video
- "'Persona' Comeback Trailer" on YouTube

"Persona" is a song by South Korean boy band BTS, rapped as a solo by member RM. It was released digitally on April 12, 2019, as part of the extended play Map of the Soul: Persona. It was later included in the band's 2020 studio album Map of the Soul: 7.

== Promotion ==
Big Hit promoted the song in a tweet upon release. There are plans to also promote the song, along with the album, on the upcoming Speak Yourself tour.

The song was performed for the first time at the 2019 Melon Music Awards on November 30, 2019.

== Music video ==
The music video was directed by Choi Yong-seok and co-directed by Guzza of Lumpens. Yoon Ji-hye and Park Hye-jeong, also from Lumpens, were the assistant directors, and Nam Hyun-woo of GDW was the Director of Photography. The Art Directors were Park Jin-sil Park and Kim Bo-na while the art assistant team was Ahn Ye-min and Kim Gyu-hee. The Gaffer was Song Hyun-suk of Real Lighting and Artist Management was Kim Shin-gyu, Kim Se-in, Kim Dae-young, Kim Su-bin, Bang Min-wook, Lee Jung-min, An Da-sol, and Park Jun-tae. The Visual Creative team was Kim Sung Hyun, Lee Sun-kyoung, Kim Ga-eun, and Lee Hye-ri.

The video references various visuals and sounds from their "Skool Luv Affair" concept they had in 2014. Throughout it RM can be seen rapping in an empty classroom and addressing a squadron of cyborgs. RM is confronted with various versions of himself with words such as "persona," "shadow," and "ego" which references Carl Jung's theories of psychology. In the song he rapped, "My shadow, I wrote and called it 'hesitation.'" According to Jung's theories, a "shadow" represents the dark side of one's personality. RM appears to start rapping from the perspective of his shadow, telling his flaws over the beat of a guitar. But RM also finds power in reclaiming these insecurities. Additionally, he wears a jacket that has emblemed on it, "Pay no attention to the man behind the curtain,” which could reference Jung's teachings about having two versions of oneself: the person who everyone sees, and the person behind the curtain that is hidden.

The robots pictured in the music video were made by 3D Humanoid and the CGI RM was made through motion capture. The video reached five million views in seven hours.

== Composition and lyrics ==
The song is in the hip hop and trap genre, and features guitar. It also samples the song "Intro: Skool Luv Affair" from the 2014 EP of the same name.

The first half of the song's lyrics ask introspective questions about RM's existence and flaws, while the second half encourages him to embrace these qualities. The phrasing is similar to that of a diary entry. RM also mentions past controversies in the lyrics of "Persona", rapping “Three syllables of my name, and the word ‘but’ that should come before any of those”. (Note: These original lines are in Korean. The Hangul is as follows: "이 시간에 원래 질문에 대해 생각할 때마다 / 내 이름과 그 앞에 형용사". The translation is taken from the listed Newsweek source.) The words "But Namjoon" (RM's birth name) have been used by some fans in K-pop circles to direct criticism away from another artist and instead focus it on RM. According to Kelly Wynne of Newsweek, "the action of taking back 'but Namjoon' [...] can be compared to other artists using hateful speech against them to their own creative advantage", such as Taylor Swift reclaiming the snake emoji and using it as a symbol of personal power. Wynne also called the song an, "outright analysis into definition of self", imposing questions of oneself upon listeners also.

== Reception ==
Natalie Morin of Refinery29 called the song colorful and dynamic, while Kelly Wynne from Newsweek said the track was a "fitting opener" for the album and that it was "bold and confident.

== Accolades ==
Year-end lists
Critic/Publication	List	Rank	Notes	Ref.
Rolling Stone India	10 Best K-pop Music Videos of 2019	—N/a	Music video	

== Charts ==
Chart (2019–2022)	Peak position
Hungary (Single Top 40)	22
Lithuania (AGATA)	39
Malaysia (RIM)	14
South Korea (Gaon)	34
UK Indie (OCC)	17
Vietnam (Vietnam Hot 100)	56
