= Arcades (band) =

British electronic music production duo

ARCADES
- Genres: EDM, pop
- Label: Twin Music Inc
- Members: Max Graham; Matt Thomson
- Website: arcadesuk.com

ARCADES is a British electronic music production duo consisting of Matt Thomson and Max Graham. They are best known for their co-writing and production of several songs on BTS albums Map of the Soul: Persona and Map of the Soul: 7. The duo have achieved album credit sales upwards of 30 million worldwide.

== Background ==
Thomson fronted indie punk band Parka, who had success after the release of their debut single, "Disco Dancer" through Universal Music Group. They toured Japan and Europe. Thomson moved into production and began releasing original songs under the name Harbour. Graham was working as a studio engineer in New York and met Thomson upon his return to work for James F. Reynolds in London.

The duo worked under the name Parallax briefly in 2016. They then formed a new project under the new name Digital Army and released official remixes for Kokiri, Conor Maynard, Kriss Kross Amsterdam, and Ty Dolla Sign.

ARCADES was originally formed in 2018, after their first single release "In The Air" featuring LA based singer Sarah Walk. The song was supported by YouTube channels CloudKid and Freshmixes. It gained the attention of BTS member J-Hope, who added the song to his Spotify playlist J-Hope's Jam. Their follow up single "Fragile" featuring SOFIA was released at the start of 2019 and has gained over 2 million YouTube views.

The duo released two more songs: "Running" featuring Ryan Lawrie in 2019 followed by "Stars" featuring PRIDES in 2020.

ARCADES then co-wrote and produced two songs on the BTS album Map of the Soul: Persona, Jamais Vu and Mikrokosmos. Later in 2019 the duo received song writing credits on, New Rules, the opening track on the album The Dream Chapter: Magic by K-pop boyband TXT. The duo co wrote the song Inner Child from the 2020 BTS album, Map of the Soul: 7.

In 2021, Arcades co-wrote Tomorrow X Together’s single “0X1=LOVESONG (I Know I Love You)”, which debuted at number three on the Billboard World Digital Song Sales chart. In 2022, they co-wrote the BTS single “Stay Alive”, produced by Suga, which debuted on the U.S. Billboard Hot 100 and topped the World Digital Song Sales chart. The duo later co-wrote the BTS anniversary single “Take Two” in 2023, which reached number one on the Billboard Digital Song Sales chart. They have also written songs for artists including ENHYPEN, Jimin, SHI

== Discography ==
=== Singles ===
Arcades - In The Air ft. Sarah Walk

- Released: 2018
- Label: Twin Music Inc

Arcades - In The Air ft. Sarah Walk (acoustic)

- Released: 2018
- Label: Twin Music Inc

Arcades - Fragile ft. SOFIA

- Released: 2019
- Label: Twin Music Inc

Arcades - Running ft Ryan Lawrie

- Released: 2019
- Label: Twin Music Inc

Arcades - Stars ft Prides(acoustic)

- Released: 2020
- Label: Twin Music Inc

=== Song-writing and production credits ===
Jin - Nothing Without Your Love

- Released: 2025
- Label: Big Hit Entertainment

Jin ft Yena - Loser

- Released: 2025
- Label: Big Hit Entertainment

Jin - Another Level

- Released: 2024
- Label: Big Hit Entertainment

Jimin ft Sofia Carson - Slow Dance

- Released: 2024
- Label: Big Hit Entertainment

BTS – Take Two

- Released: 2023
- Label: Big Hit Entertainment

BTS - The Planet

- Released: 2023
- Label: Big Hit Entertainment

Fifty Fifty - Higher

- Released: 2023
- Label: Attrakt

BTS - Stay Alive

- Released: 2022
- Label: Big Hit Entertainment

BTS – Inner Child

- Released: 2020
- Label: Big Hit Entertainment

BTS – Mikrokosmos

- Released: 2019
- Label: Big Hit Entertainment

BTS – Jamais Vu

- Released: 2019
- Label: Big Hit Entertainment

TXT – New Rules

- Released: 2019
- Label: Big Hit Entertainment

Taemin - 2 Kids (single)

- Released: 2020
- Label: Twin Music Inc

Taemin - Think Of You (single)

- Released: 2020
- Label: Twin Music Inc

Enhypen - Flicker (album track)

- Released: 2020
- Label: Twin Music Inc

Got7 - We Are Young (album track)

- Released: 2020
- Label: Twin Music Inc

SHINee - Atlantis (single)

- Released: 2021
- Label: Twin Music Inc

TXT - 0X1=LOVESONG (single)

- Released: 2021
- Label: BigHit Music

TXT - Dear Sputnik (album track)

- Released: 2021
- Label: BigHit Music

TXT - Moa Diary (album track)

- Released: 2021
- Label: BigHit Music

KEY - Another Life (album track)

- Released: 2022
- Label: SM Entertainment

Enhypen - Attention Please (album track)

- Released: 2021
- Label: Belift Lab

Marcus McCoan - Hair Down (single)

- Released: 2020
- Label: Twin Music Inc
