= Dionysus (BTS song) =

Song by BTS

Song by BTS

from the EP Map of the Soul: Persona
- Language: Korean
- Released: April 12, 2019
- Genre: Rap rock; synthpop; hip hop
- Length: 4:08
- Label: Big Hit
- Songwriters: Pdogg; J-Hope; Supreme Boi; RM; Suga; Roman Campolo
- Producer: Pdogg

"Dionysus" is a song by South Korean boy band BTS. It was released digitally on April 12, 2019, as part of the extended play Map of the Soul: Persona. Inspired by the Greek god Dionysus, a mix of rap-rock, synth-pop, and hip-hop with deep lyrics reflecting on stardom and artistic integrity.

Critics praised "Dionysus" as BTS's boldest release, with Billboard dubbing it as the group's most audacious track, while NME highlighted Jin's falsetto as a standout moment. The song was heavily promoted in Korea and received dynamic performances at various music awards shows.

== Background and release ==
Big Hit Entertainment teased the song title when they posted a short description of Dionysus on their official website. Upon doing so it trended on Twitter worldwide. The song was announced to be on their album tracklist Map of the Soul: Persona a few days before the scheduled release of April 12, 2019. The track was also hinted at when teaser pictures of the members holding grapes were released.

== Composition and lyrics ==
In a press release RM described the song as, "the joy and pain of creating something" and "an honest track". It is named after the Greek god of the same name, known for debauchery and excess. It is in the genre of rap-rock, synth-pop, and hip-hop and consist of multi-part hooks, a trap breakdown, an ending chorus that has double-time drums and features Jin's 'rocking adlibs' throughout the song.

Lyrically, the song talks about their stardom, legacy, and artistic integrity. Some of the nuances may be difficult to understand because of the word play that gets lost in translation. On the surface it may seem like a party song with the group shouting "Drink, drink, drink!" at different intervals, but in reality, the lyrics call for getting drunk on art, in the creative process. While "alcohol" in Korean is "술", "art" in Korean is "예술". Also, looking deeper into the lyrics, it shows self reflection such as when Suga raps, "What does it matter if I'm an idol or an artist?" It links back to their previous song "Idol" that asked the same reflective questions."

== Reception ==
Jason Lipshutz of Billboard called the song, "the most outlandish song BTS has ever released" and a "harbinger". Jess Lau from The 405 called "Dionysus" the "real stand out single" and "full of attitude and confidence", while Salvatore Maicki from Fader called it a "booze-filled rager". In the review of "The 50 best albums of 2019", NME hailed "Jin's spine-tingling falsetto wails during the final headbang-worthy section of 'Dionysus'" as the "Best Moment" from the album.

Year-end lists
Critic/Publication	List	Rank	Ref.
MTV	The Best K-pop B-sides of 2019	5	

== Promotion ==
BTS promoted the song in Korea on the shows Inkigayo, Show! Music Core, Music Bank, and M Countdown. BTS gave a high-octane performance of the song at the 2019 Melon Music Awards and 2019 Mnet Asian Music Awards, where the group swept all grand prizes. The song was also performed at the 2019 SBS Gayo Daejeon and the 2019 KBS Song Festival.

== Charts ==
Chart (2019)	Peak position
Canada Hot 100 (Billboard)	88
Hungary (Single Top 40)	25
Japan (Japan Hot 100)	65
Lithuania (AGATA)	24
Malaysia (RIM)	11
Slovakia Singles Digital (ČNS IFPI)	95
South Korea (Gaon)	21
South Korea (Billboard K-pop Hot 100)	6
UK Indie (Official Charts)	14
US Bubbling Under Hot 100 (Billboard)	11

== Certifications ==
Region	Certification	Certified units/sales
Streaming
Japan (RIAJ)	Gold	50,000,000^{†}
^{†} Streaming-only figures based on certification alone.
