= Map of the Soul: Persona =

2019 EP by BTS

- Digital cover

EP by BTS
- Released: April 12, 2019
- Recorded: 2019
- Studios: Big Hit (Seoul) (Note: BTS members and the Big Hit production team have individual "studios" within the greater Big Hit Entertainment building. These are credited separately in the liner notes.); The Village (Los Angeles)
- Genres: Pop; R&B; rap rock
- Length: 26:05
- Languages: Korean; English
- Labels: Big Hit; iriver (Note: In South Korea, the album is distributed by Dreamus, an iriver subsidiary.)
- Producers: Pdogg; Hiss Noise; Arcades; Fred Again; Bad Milk; Marcus McCoan

BTS chronology
Love Yourself: Answer (2018)	Map of the Soul: Persona (2019)	BTS World: Original Soundtrack (2019)

Singles from Map of the Soul: Persona
- 1. "Boy with Luv" Released: April 12, 2019; 2. "Make It Right" Released: October 18, 2019

Map of the Soul: Persona is the sixth extended play by South Korean boy band BTS. It was released on April 12, 2019, via Big Hit Entertainment with "Boy with Luv" as its lead single. It is the follow-up to their 2018 albums Love Yourself: Tear and Love Yourself: Answer, and preceded the band's Love Yourself: Speak Yourself world tour. American singer Lauv appeared on a version of the track "Make It Right" that was released on October 18, 2019, as the album's second single.

The EP debuted at number one on the US Billboard 200, making BTS the first band since the Beatles to have three number-one albums in less than a year. The album also topped the UK, Scottish, New Zealand and Australian charts, making BTS the first Korean act to achieve a number-one album in each of these countries. Moreover, the album sold 3.2 million copies in one month, making it the best-selling album in South Korea, replacing the previous record-holder of 24 years.

== Background and release ==
BTS first announced Map of the Soul: Persona on March 11, 2019, pre-orders began on March 13. The EP marked a "new era" in the band's discography, after the completion of its Love Yourself series in 2018 with the release of the Love Yourself: Tear and Love Yourself: Answer albums. It was set for release before the band embarked on the stadium extension of its Love Yourself world tour, named Love Yourself: Speak Yourself.

On March 27, the group released the official "comeback trailer" for their album, named "Persona" which would later become the introduction to the extended play. The solo featured RM, the leader of BTS, and was described by Refinery29's Natalie Morin as "a colorful, dynamic song" and "nodding to the band's coming-of-age and self-discovery themes," which lyrics such as "Who am I? The question I had my whole life..." and "The flaws of mine that I know... The regrets that I don't even get sick of anymore."

On March 31, Big Hit released the first two of four sets of concept photos labelled as Versions 1–4. "Version 1" showed "BTS playing around in a photo booth", with solo shots "show[ing] off each member in a variety of poses". "Version 2" highlighted "different sides, or personas, of each BTS member", as described by Billboard. The final two versions were released on April 3. "Version 3" showed the band members posing with roses in rose-toned rooms. "Version 4" featured them posing with either grapes or strawberries while wearing elegant clothing and jewelry.

On April 7, the band released the first music video teaser, revealing that American singer Halsey would be on the track and that the name of the title track would be named "Boy with Luv." One day later, on April 8, the group released the tracklist and album cover of the album, unveiling the seven tracks of the EP. On April 10, BTS released the final, second teaser of the song which featured a longer sample of the track. A new version of the B-side track "Make It Right", featuring American singer Lauv, was released on October 18 as the second single from the album.

== Composition and production ==
Map of the Soul: Persona has influences from various places. The album itself is based on the Murray Stein book Jung's Map of the Soul, about the theories Carl Jung created for psychology.

The lead single, the Halsey collaboration "Boy with Luv," has been described as a funk pop song about happiness and love. It serves as a parallel track to their earlier song "Boy in Luv". In the video for "Persona" words such as "persona", "shadow", and "ego" were in it which directly references Carl Jung's theories. It has been described as a song that is trying to answer the question of "Who am I?"

"Mikrokosmos" and "Home" are songs dedicated to the fans, as they are the home that comforts BTS when they are tired and lonely. The track "Mikrokosmos" is named after the ancient Greek philosophical concept of the microcosm, and the song's Korean name, 소우주 (souju), means the same. BTS stated that "Mikrokosmos" would "paint the world through human interest". "Mikrokosmos" co-writer Ryan Lawrie, who releases music as KOOLKID, has explained he wrote the song's signature guitar riff in his bedroom at 3 in the morning, and says that working with BTS "literally changed [his] life."

"Make It Right" is a collaboration between BTS and Ed Sheeran, and "Jamais Vu" is a unit song consisting of the members J-Hope, Jin, and Jungkook. The EP also features references to Greek mythology, with a track called "Dionysus", the Greek god of grapes and wine, and their concept photos depicting a few of the members holding grapes. It was described as a strong hip hop track with an intense beat, significant rock influence, vocoder effects and features Jin's rocking adlibs throughout the song.

== Promotion ==
=== Pre-release ===
The introductory video played before the band's performance at the 2018 Mnet Asian Music Awards in Hong Kong had hinted at the title before its official announcement. The album is reportedly the "beginning of a new chapter" for the band, and the first in a new series of albums.

On March 27, the trailer for the album was released named "Persona". The solo featured RM, the leader of BTS. The trailer for the song "Boy with Luv" featuring American singer Halsey was released on April 7, 2019. The second teaser trailer was released on April 10 and featured a longer sample of "Boy with Luv".

=== Live performances ===
BTS made several appearances on television and in live shows to promote Map of the Soul: Persona. The group performed "Boy with Luv" for the first time on April 13, 2019, on Saturday Night Live as the first Asian act to perform live on the show. BTS also performed "Boy with Luv" with Halsey for the first time at the 2019 Billboard Music Awards. On May 15, BTS kicked off Good Morning America's 'Summer Concert Series' as headliners at Central Park in Manhattan with performances of "Boy with Luv" and "Fire". On May 16, BTS recreated The Beatles' iconic 1964 U.S. television debut in their black-and-white performance of "Boy with Luv" at The Late Show with Stephen Colbert. They also sang "Make it Right" in the same show on May 18. On May 21, BTS appeared on the finale of The Voice to perform "Boy with Luv". They also performed the song at Britain Got Talent's fourth semi-final on May 30.

On November 30, BTS performed "Intro: Persona", "Boy with Luv", "Mikrokosmos", and "Dionysus" at the 2019 Melon Music Awards with throwbacks to "Boy in Luv" and "N.O" from their earlier works. BTS then traveled to Japan to perform early singles "N.O" and "We are Bulletproof Pt. 2" before wrapping the set with "Boy with Luv", "Mikrokosmos", and "Dionysus" at the 2019 Mnet Asian Music Awards. Two days later, BTS appeared as a headliner at the KIIS-FM Jingle Ball in Los Angeles, performing earlier track "Mic Drop" along with "Boy with Luv" and "Make it Right". BTS performed in South Korea at the SBS Gayo Daejun and KBS Song Festival on December 25 and 27, respectively, before traveling to New York's Times Square to usher in the new year with performances of "Make it Right" and "Boy with Luv" at Dick Clark's New Year's Rockin' Eve.

== Critical reception ==
Professional ratings
Aggregate scores
Source	Rating
AnyDecentMusic?	7/10
Metacritic	74/100
Review scores
Source	Rating
The 405	7/10
AllMusic	4/5 stars
Clash	6/10
Consequence of Sound	A−
The Guardian	3/5 stars
The Independent	3/5 stars
The Line of Best Fit	9.5/10
NME	4/5 stars
Pitchfork	6.1/10
Rolling Stone	3/5 stars

According to the review aggregator Metacritic, Map of the Soul: Persona received "generally favorable reviews" based on a weighted average score of 74 out of 100 from 11 critic scores.

Neil Z. Young of AllMusic gave the album a positive review, stating, "Although it's only the first piece of the puzzle, on its own, Map of the Soul: Persona is a fitting celebration for a group at the top of their game." Rhian Daly of NME wrote that "Map Of The Soul: Persona impressively and cohesively flies from genre to genre, but sounds more confident than ever."

Douglas Greenwood of The Independent, however, gave the album a mixed review, pointing out that, "When they stand on their own two feet without the major co-stars, BTS are still fully confident of their own sound" but "the music, production-wise, falls a little by the wayside when it comes to breaking new ground."

== Commercial performance ==
According to iriver Inc, the distributor for the Map of the Soul: Persona, stock preorders for the EP surpassed 2.68 million copies over the first five days of the preorder period. The number was later updated to 3.07 million on April 11, the day before the EP's release.

In South Korea, the EP recorded 2.13 million first-week sales, the highest number for an artist in the country since the Hanteo Chart began tracking weekly sales at its inception. Map of the Soul: Persona debuted at number one on the Gaon Album Chart with all tracks debuting on the Gaon Digital Chart, including the lead single "Boy With Luv", which debuted at 17 and reached number one the following week. The songs "Mikrokosmos" and "Make It Right" also reached the top ten in their second charting week, debuting at 31 and 39 before peaking at number eight and ten respectively. Map of the Soul: Persona sold 3,229,032 copies in its first month the country, making it the highest-selling release on the Gaon Music Chart since its inception in 2011. The EP also became the best-selling album of all time in South Korea, surpassing Kim Gun-mo's 1995 album Wrongful Encounter. (Note: The total sales for Wrongful Encounter are 2.86 million, however, when including illegal sales, the album is estimated have sold 3.3 million total copies. This estimate has been acknowledged by Guinness World Records. In May 2019, the sales for Map of the Soul: Persona reached 3,399,302 sales, surpassing Kim's estimate.) In May 2019, the album received 3x Million certification from Gaon for surpassing three million total sales. BTS are the first group to be awarded the certification.

In the United Kingdom, Persona's midweek sales were higher than the first week sales of BTS' three previous Top 20 releases combined, including Love Yourself: Tear, the only BTS album to hit the UK top ten. Map of the Soul: Persona eventually became BTS' first number one album in the United Kingdom, as well as the first Korean musical act to reach number one, with 26,500 album-equivalent units, 68% of which (roughly 18,020 albums) came from pure sales. The EP's lead single "Boy with Luv" debuted at number 13 on the UK singles chart, becoming BTS' first top-15 track in the United Kingdom. Two other tracks from Persona, "Mikrokosmos" and "Make It Right", debuted on the singles chart at number 71 and 74 respectively.

The EP debuted at number one on Australia's ARIA Albums Chart, becoming the first chart-topping album sung in an Asian language. The album became BTS' fourth top-ten album in Australia, following their three Love Yourself series albums: Love Yourself: Her, Love Yourself: Tear, and Love Yourself: Answer, released in 2017 and 2018. "Boy with Luv" debuted at number 10 on the ARIA Singles Chart, becoming BTS' first top-ten single in the country.

In the United States, Map of the Soul: Persona debuted at number one on the Billboard 200 with 230,000 album-equivalent units, including 196,000 pure album sales, becoming the band's biggest week in terms of units. It is BTS' third number-one album in roughly 11 months, making them the first band to achieve three number-ones in a year since the Beatles in 1995 through 1996. BTS also became the band with the second-fastest accumulation of three number-one albums since the Billboard 200's inception. (Note: BTS is second to the American pop rock band the Monkees, who had three number-one albums in nine months and three weeks in 1967. The former second place holder was the Beatles, whose 1995 and 1996 compilation albums all peaked at number one in 11 months and one week.) The EP's lead single "Boy With Luv" debuted at number eight on the Billboard Hot 100 with 31,000 pure sales and 19.5 million streams. The track was at the time BTS' highest-charting song and second top-ten song following "Fake Love", which peaked at number 10, and made them the first K-Pop group with multiple top-tens as well as the second Korean artist, following Psy. "Make It Right" also charted on the Hot 100, debuting at number 95 with 11,600 pure sales and making BTS the first Korean artist to have two simultaneous songs appear on the chart. All songs from the EP appeared on the Billboard Digital Songs chart with a cumulative 82,100 purchases across all seven tracks. It was certified Gold by the RIAA on August 22, for selling over half a million units, and is their second album after 2018's Love Yourself: Answer to achieve this.

With strong – yet underreported – global sales of 2.5 million pure album units, Map of the Soul: Persona was named as the third best-selling album of 2019 by the International Federation of the Phonographic Industry. Map of the Soul: Persona was also the second best-selling global album by a band only behind Arashi's 5x20 All the Best!! 1999–2019. Attributing to the album's critical and commercial success worldwide, the IFPI named BTS as one of the best-selling artists of 2019 for a second consecutive year, making them the first Korean artist to achieve this.

== Track listing ==
Track listing adapted from the liner notes of the physical album.

No.	Title	Writer(s)	Producer(s)	Length
1.	"Intro: Persona" (performed by RM)	Hiss Noise; RM; Pdogg	Hiss Noise	2:54
2.	"Boy with Luv" (작은 것들을 위한 시; Jageun geotdeureul wihan si [lit. "A Poem for Small Things"]) (featuring Halsey)	Pdogg; RM; Melanie Joy Fontana; Michel "Lindgren" Schulz; "Hitman" Bang; Suga; Emily Weisband; J-Hope; Ashley Frangipane	Pdogg	3:49
3.	"Mikrokosmos" (소우주; Souju)	Matty Thomson; Max Lynedoch Graham; Marcus McCoan; Ryan Lawrie; James F. Reynolds; RM; Suga; J-Hope; "DJ Swivel" Young; Candace Nicole Sosa; Fontana; Lindgren	Arcades	3:46
4.	"Make It Right"	Fred Again; Ed Sheeran; Benjy Gibson; Jo Hill; RM; Suga; J-Hope	F. Gibson	3:42
5.	"Home"	Pdogg; RM; Lauren Dyson; Tushar Apte; Suga; J-Hope; Krysta Youngs; Julia Ross; Bobby Chung; Song Jae-kyung; Adora	Pdogg	4:00
6.	"Jamais Vu" (performed by Jin, J-Hope, and Jungkook)	McCoan; Owen Roberts; Thomson; Graham; Reynolds; RM; J-Hope; "Hitman" Bang	Arcades; Bad Milk; McCoan	3:46
7.	"Dionysus"	Pdogg; J-Hope; Supreme Boi; RM; Suga; Roman Campolo	Pdogg	4:08
Total length:				26:05

Notes:

- "Intro: Persona" was also called "Persona" during its pre-release period.
- Fred Gibson's producer credit is under the stylized name "FRED".
- "Home" is stylized in all caps.
- "Jamais Vu" is stylized in sentence case.

== Personnel ==
Personnel adapted from the liner notes of the physical album.

- Adora – songwriting, digital editing, chorus
- Tushar Apte – songwriting
- Arcades – producing
- Bad Milk – producing
- BTS – primary vocals
- Roman Campolo – songwriting
- El Capitxn – digital editing
- Bobby Chung – songwriting
- Lauren Dyson – songwriting
- Melanie Joy Fontana – songwriting, chorus
- Ashley "Halsey" Frangipane – featured vocals, songwriting, chorus
- Benjy Gibson – songwriting
- Fred Gibson – production, songwriting, drums, keyboard, synthesizer, programming
- Max Lynedoch Graham – songwriting, guitar, keyboard, percussion, vocoder, programming
- Jo Hill – songwriting
- "Hitman" Bang – songwriting
- Hiss Noise – songwriting, production, keyboard, synthesizer, guitar, gang vocal, recording engineer, digital editing
- Jeong U-yeong – digital editing
- J-Hope – songwriting, gang vocal, chorus
- Jungkook – chorus
- Kim Si-yeon – recording engineer
- Ryan Lawrie – songwriting
- Lee Tae-uk – guitar
- Marcus McCoan – producer, songwriting, chorus, programming
- Park Jin-sae – recording engineer
- Pdogg – songwriting, production, vocal arrangement, rap arrangement, keyboard, synthesizer, gang vocal, recording engineer, digital editing
- Phil X – guitar
- James F. Reynolds – songwriting
- RM – songwriting, rap arrangement, gang vocal, chorus, recording engineer
- Owen Roberts – songwriting, keyboard, percussion
- Julia Ross – songwriting
- Michel "Lindgren" Schulz – songwriting, recording engineer
- Ed Sheeran – songwriting
- Song Jae-kyung – songwriting
- Suga – songwriting
- Supreme Boi – songwriting, rap arrangement, gang vocal, recording engineer, digital editing
- Matty Thompson – songwriting, guitar, keyboard, percussion, vocoder
- Emily Weisband – songwriting
- Alex Williams – recording engineer
- Krysta Youngs – songwriting

== Accolades ==
Awards
Organization	Year	Award	Result	Ref.
Melon Music Awards	2019	Album of the Year	Won	
Mnet Asian Music Awards	2019	Album of the Year	Won	
Gaon Chart Music Awards	2020	Album of the Year – 2nd Quarter	Won	
Gaon Chart Music Awards	2020	Retail Album of the Year	Won	
Golden Disc Awards	2020	Album Bonsang	Won	
Golden Disc Awards	2020	Album Daesang	Won	
Seoul Music Awards	2020	Bonsang Award	Won	
Seoul Music Awards	2020	Album Daesang	Won	

Year-end lists
Critic/Publication	List	Rank	Ref.
AllMusic	AllMusic 2019 Year In Review: Favorite Pop Albums	—N/a	
Billboard	The 25 Best K-pop Albums of 2019: Critics' Picks	16	
Consequence of Sound	Top 50 Albums of 2019	32	
NME	The 50 best albums of 2019	36	
PopCrush	Best Pop Albums of 2019	—N/a	

== Charts ==
=== Weekly charts ===
Weekly chart performance
Chart (2019–2022)	Peak position
Argentine Albums (CAPIF)	1
Australian Albums (ARIA)	1
Austrian Albums (Ö3 Austria)	4
Belgian Albums (Ultratop Flanders)	3
Belgian Albums (Ultratop Wallonia)	16
Canadian Albums (Billboard)	1
Croatian International Albums (HDU)	29
Czech Albums (ČNS IFPI)	2
Danish Albums (Hitlisten)	5
Dutch Albums (Album Top 100)	2
Estonian Albums (Eesti Ekspress)	2
Finnish Albums (Suomen virallinen lista)	3
French Albums (SNEP)	5
German Albums (Offizielle Top 100)	3
Hungarian Albums (MAHASZ)	7
Icelandic Albums (Tónlistinn)	15
Irish Albums (IRMA)	6
Italian Albums (FIMI)	5
Japanese Albums (Oricon)	2
Japanese Hot Albums (Billboard Japan)	2
Latvian Albums (LAIPA)	2
Lithuanian Albums (AGATA)	1
Mexican Albums (AMPROFON)	3
New Zealand Albums (RMNZ)	1
Norwegian Albums (VG-lista)	3
Polish Albums (ZPAV)	2
Scottish Albums (Official Charts)	1
Slovak Albums (ČNS IFPI)	6
South Korean Albums (Gaon)	1
Spanish Albums (Promusicae)	3
Swedish Albums (Sverigetopplistan)	2
Swiss Albums (Schweizer Hitparade)	3
UK Albums (Official Charts)	1
UK Independent Albums (Official Charts)	1
US Billboard 200	1
US Independent Albums (Billboard)	1
US Indie Store Album Sales (Billboard)	1
US World Albums (Billboard)	1

=== Monthly charts ===
Monthly chart performance
Chart (2019)	Peak position
Japanese Albums (Oricon)	2
South Korean Albums (Gaon)	1

=== Year-end charts ===
Year-end chart performance
Chart (2019)	Position
Australian Albums (ARIA)	32
Austrian Albums (Ö3 Austria)	53
Belgian Albums (Ultratop Flanders)	36
Belgian Albums (Ultratop Wallonia)	109
Dutch Albums (Album Top 100)	63
French Albums (SNEP)	73
German Albums (Offizielle Top 100)	42
Hungarian Albums - Rank (MAHASZ)	31
Hungarian Albums - Sales (MAHASZ)	35
Italian Albums (FIMI)	97
Japanese Albums (Billboard Japan)	21
Japanese Albums (Oricon)	5
Latvian Albums (LAIPA)	50
New Zealand Albums (RMNZ)	35
Polish Albums (ZPAV)	31
South Korean Albums (Gaon)	1
Spanish Albums (PROMUSICAE)	24
Swiss Albums (Schweizer Hitparade)	44
UK Albums (OCC)	66
US Billboard 200	51
US Independent Albums (Billboard)	1
US Rolling Stone 200	48
US World Albums (Billboard)	1
Worldwide Albums (IFPI)	3
Chart (2020)	Position
South Korean Albums (Gaon)	45
Chart (2021)	Position
Hungarian Albums (MAHASZ)	80
Japanese Albums (Oricon)	73
South Korean Albums (Gaon)	39
Chart (2022)	Position
South Korean Albums (Circle)	44

== Certifications and sales ==
Certifications and sales
Region	Certification	Certified units/sales
Belgium (BRMA)	Gold	10,000^{‡}
Canada (Music Canada)	Platinum	80,000^{‡}
China	—	546,165
France (SNEP)	Gold	50,000^{‡}
Hungary (MAHASZ)	Gold	2,000^{‡}
Italy (FIMI)	Gold	25,000^{‡}
Japan (RIAJ)	Gold	353,847
New Zealand (RMNZ)	Gold	7,500^{‡}
Poland (ZPAV)	Platinum	20,000^{‡}
South Korea (KMCA)	4× Million	4,607,281
Spain (Promusicae)	Gold	20,000^{‡}
United Kingdom (BPI)	Gold	100,000^{‡}
United States (RIAA)	Gold	500,000^{‡}
^{‡} Sales+streaming figures based on certification alone.

== Release history ==
Country	Date	Format	Label
South Korea	April 12, 2019	CD; digital download; streaming	Big Hit; iriver
Europe	April 12, 2019	CD; digital download; streaming	Big Hit; iriver; Columbia
North America	April 12, 2019	CD; digital download; streaming	Big Hit; iriver; Columbia
Various	April 12, 2019	Digital download; streaming	Big Hit

== See also ==
- List of best-selling albums in South Korea
- List of Billboard 200 number-one albums of 2019
- List of Gaon Album Chart number ones of 2019
- List of K-pop songs on the Billboard charts
- List of K-pop albums on the Billboard charts
- List of number-one albums of 2019 (Australia)
- List of number-one albums of 2019 (Canada)
- List of UK top-ten albums in 2019
