= List of Billboard Digital Song Sales number ones of 2018 =

2018 highest-selling digital singles in the United States

The Billboard Digital Song Sales chart is a chart that ranks the most downloaded songs in the United States. Its data is compiled by Nielsen SoundScan based on each song's weekly digital sales, which combines sales of different versions of a song by an act for a summarized figure.

== Chart history ==
Key
†	Indicates best-performing single of 2018

Issue date	Song	Artist(s)	Weekly sales	Ref(s)
January 3	"Perfect" †	Ed Sheeran and Beyoncé	151,000	
January 6	"Perfect" †	Ed Sheeran and Beyoncé	163,000	
January 13	"Perfect" †	Ed Sheeran and Beyoncé	109,000	
January 20	"Perfect" †	Ed Sheeran	98,000	
January 27	"Perfect" †	Ed Sheeran	82,000	
February 3	"God's Plan"	Drake	127,000	
February 10	"Say Something"	Justin Timberlake featuring Chris Stapleton	98,000	
February 17	"God's Plan"	Drake	55,000	
February 24	"God's Plan"	Drake	56,000	
March 3	"God's Plan"	Drake	81,000	
March 10	"Psycho"	Post Malone featuring Ty Dolla Sign	80,000	
March 17	"God's Plan"	Drake	57,000	
March 24	"God's Plan"	Drake	49,000	
March 31	"Found / Tonight"	Lin-Manuel Miranda and Ben Platt	61,000	
April 7	"God's Plan"	Drake	42,000	
April 14	"God's Plan"	Drake	48,000	
April 21	"Nice for What"	Drake	88,000	
April 28	"Cry Pretty"	Carrie Underwood	54,000	
May 5	"No Tears Left to Cry"	Ariana Grande	100,000	
May 12	"Never Be the Same"	Camila Cabello	51,000	
May 19	"This Is America"	Childish Gambino	78,000	
May 26	"This Is America"	Childish Gambino	50,000	
June 2	"Fake Love"	BTS	29,000	
June 9	"Psycho"	Post Malone featuring Ty Dolla Sign	31,000	
June 16	"Girls Like You"	Maroon 5 featuring Cardi B	82,000	
June 23	"Girls Like You"	Maroon 5 featuring Cardi B	53,000	
June 30	"Girls Like You"	Maroon 5 featuring Cardi B	52,000	
July 7	"Girls Like You"	Maroon 5 featuring Cardi B	46,000	
July 14	"Girls Like You"	Maroon 5 featuring Cardi B	49,000	
July 21	"In My Feelings"	Drake	89,000	
July 28	"In My Feelings"	Drake	115,000	
August 4	"In My Feelings"	Drake	104,000	
August 11	"In My Feelings"	Drake	72,000	
August 18	"In My Feelings"	Drake	58,000	
August 25	"In My Feelings"	Drake	38,000	
September 1	"I Like It"	Cardi B, Bad Bunny, and J Balvin	32,000	
September 8	"Idol"	BTS featuring Nicki Minaj	43,000	
September 15	"Girls Like You"	Maroon 5 featuring Cardi B	32,000	
September 22	"Rap Devil"	Machine Gun Kelly	36,000	
September 29	"Killshot"	Eminem	38,000	
October 6	"Killshot"	Eminem	53,000	
October 13	"Shallow"	Lady Gaga and Bradley Cooper	58,000	
October 20	"Shallow"	Lady Gaga and Bradley Cooper	71,000	
October 27	"Shallow"	Lady Gaga and Bradley Cooper	55,000	
November 3	"Shallow"	Lady Gaga and Bradley Cooper	42,000	
November 10	"Shallow"	Lady Gaga and Bradley Cooper	36,000	
November 17	"Thank U, Next"	Ariana Grande	81,000	
November 24	"Thank U, Next"	Ariana Grande	43,000	
December 1	"Without Me"	Halsey	37,000	
December 8	"Without Me"	Halsey	29,000	
December 15	"Without Me"	Halsey	50,000	
December 22	"Without Me"	Halsey	37,000	
December 29	"Without Me"	Halsey	37,000	
