= Waste It on Me =

Single by Steve Aoki featuring BTS

from the album Neon Future III
- Released: October 25, 2018
- Genre: Future bass; dance-pop
- Length: 3:12
- Label: Ultra
- Songwriters: Michael Gazzo; Nate Cyphert; Ryan Ogren; Sean Foreman; Steve Aoki; RM; Jeff Halavacs
- Producer: Steve Aoki

Steve Aoki singles chronology
"Hoovela" (2018)	"Waste It on Me" (2018)	"Are You Lonely" (2019)

BTS singles chronology
"Idol" (2018)	"Waste It on Me" (2018)	"Airplane Pt. 2" (2018)

Music video
- "Waste It on Me" on YouTube

"Waste It on Me" is a song by American musician and DJ Steve Aoki featuring RM and Jungkook of BTS, released on October 25, 2018. It follows Aoki and BTS' collaborations on the remix of "Mic Drop" and "The Truth Untold". The song features on his fifth studio album Neon Future III, released on November 9, 2018.

In December 2018, it was announced a Slushii remix and a Cheat Codes remix would be released in the same month.

== Composition ==
Billboard stated that the song is an "ambient EDM track" with lyrics in English, while EDM.com felt the track was "vaguely future bass-reminiscent". Kyle Shokeye of Complex wrote that because it is BTS's first fully English-language song, it "deviates from their usual formula to create songs".

It was composed by Jeff Halavacs, Ryan Ogren, Michael Gazzo, Nate Cyphert, Sean Foreman, and RM, featuring the vocals of RM and Jung Kook. The song has a moderate tempo and is 96BPM. It is in E Minor with the vocals ranging from D4-B5.

== Promotion ==
Along with Aoki announcing the track on Twitter, he stated that fans could tweet the hashtag "#WasteItOnMe" to unlock a 40-second preview. Madonna shared a Michael Jackson tribute video featuring “Waste It on Me” on November 29, 2018.

== Accolades ==
Year-end lists
Critic/Publication	List	Rank	Ref.
TNT Latin America	The Best Songs of 2018	3	

== Music video ==
The music video was directed by Joe Hahn of Linkin Park and released on November 19, 2018. Compared to the music video of the OneRepublic song "Wherever I Go", which was directed by Joseph Kahn, but set in a nightclub, it features an all Asian-American cast which includes Ken Jeong, Jamie Chung, Ross Butler, Devon Aoki and Ben Baller. Cameos include Leonardo Nam, Vincent Rodriguez III, Jimmy O. Yang, Jessica Lu, Jared Eng, and Tiffany Ma.

== Charts ==
=== Weekly charts ===
Chart (2018)	Peak position
Australia (ARIA)	61
Austria (Ö3 Austria Top 40)	57
Canada Hot 100 (Billboard)	64
Canada CHR/Top 40 (Billboard)	41
Finland Digital Song Sales (Billboard)	4
Germany (GfK)	98
Greece (IFPI)	12
Hungary (Single Top 40)	3
Ireland (IRMA)	63
Japan Hot 100 (Billboard)	19
Malaysia (RIM)	1
Mexico (Mexico Airplay)	48
Mexico Ingles Airplay (Billboard)	20
New Zealand Hot Singles (RMNZ)	6
Scotland Singles (Official Charts)	28
Singapore (RIAS)	2
South Korea (Gaon)	80
Sweden Heatseeker (Sverigetopplistan)	1
Switzerland (Schweizer Hitparade)	81
UK Singles (Official Charts)	57
US Billboard Hot 100	89
US Hot Dance/Electronic Songs (Billboard)	6
US Pop Airplay (Billboard)	38

=== Year-end charts ===
Chart (2018)	Position
US Hot Dance/Electronic Songs (Billboard)	68
Chart (2019)	Position
US Hot Dance/Electronic Songs (Billboard)	33

== Certifications ==
Region	Certification	Certified units/sales
Canada (Music Canada)	Platinum	80,000^{‡}
United States (RIAA)	Gold	500,000^{‡}
^{‡} Sales+streaming figures based on certification alone.

== Release history ==
Region	Date	Format	Version	Label	Ref.
Various	October 25, 2018	Digital download	Original	Ultra Music	
United States	December 14, 2018	Digital download	Cheat Codes Remix	Ultra Music	
Various	December 21, 2018	Digital download	Cheat Codes Remix	Ultra Music	
Various	December 25, 2018	Digital download	Slushii remix	Ultra Music	
Various	December 25, 2018	Digital download	W&W Remix	Ultra Music	

== See also ==
- List of number-one songs of 2018 (Malaysia)
