= List of number-one songs of 2018 (Singapore) =

This is a list of the Singapore Top 30 Digital Streaming number-one songs in 2018, according to the Recording Industry Association Singapore.

== Chart history ==
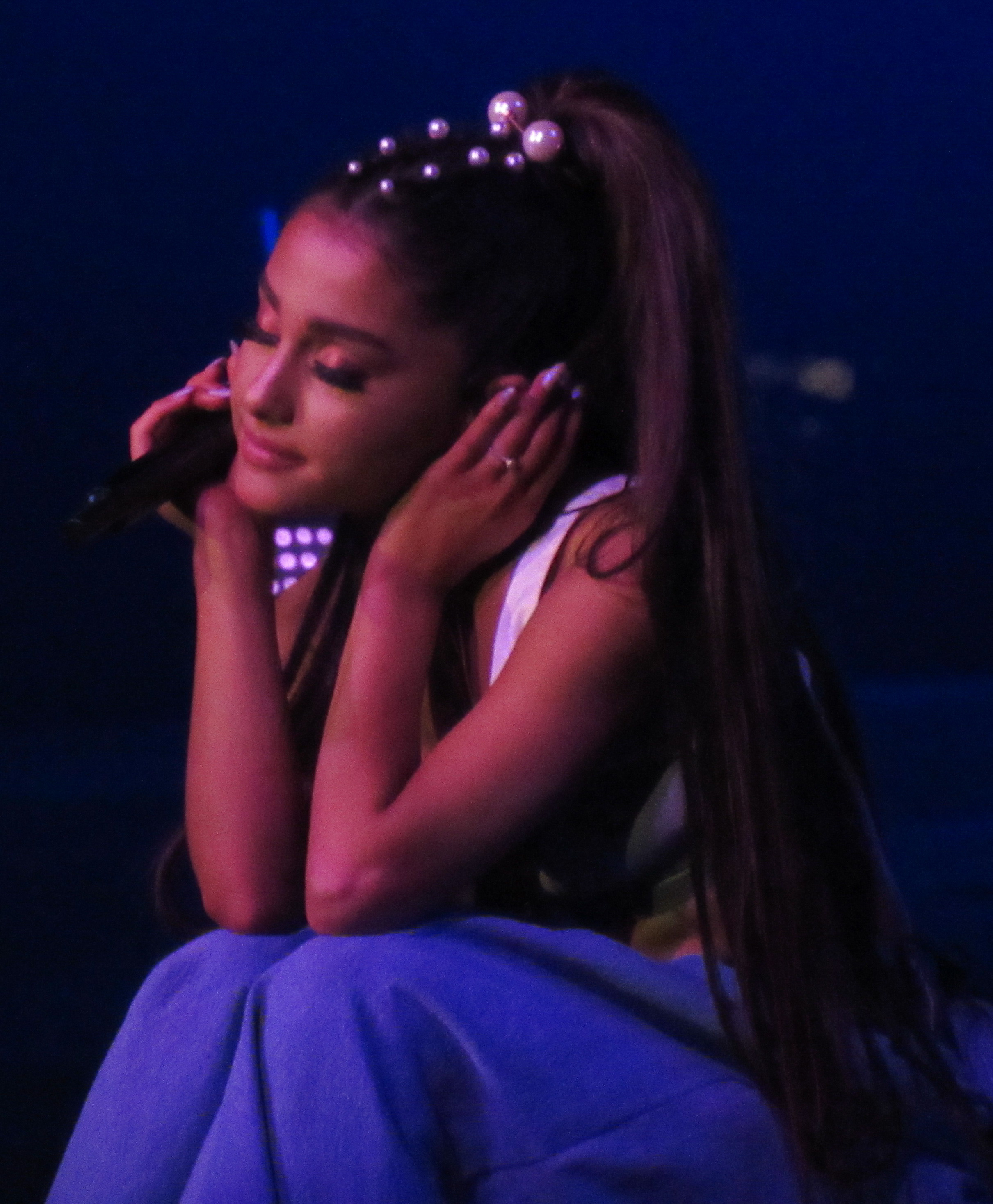
Ariana Grande earned the most weeks at number one in 2018, topping the chart for 12 weeks with "No Tears Left to Cry" and "Thank U, Next", the longest-running number-one song of the year for 8 consecutive weeks.

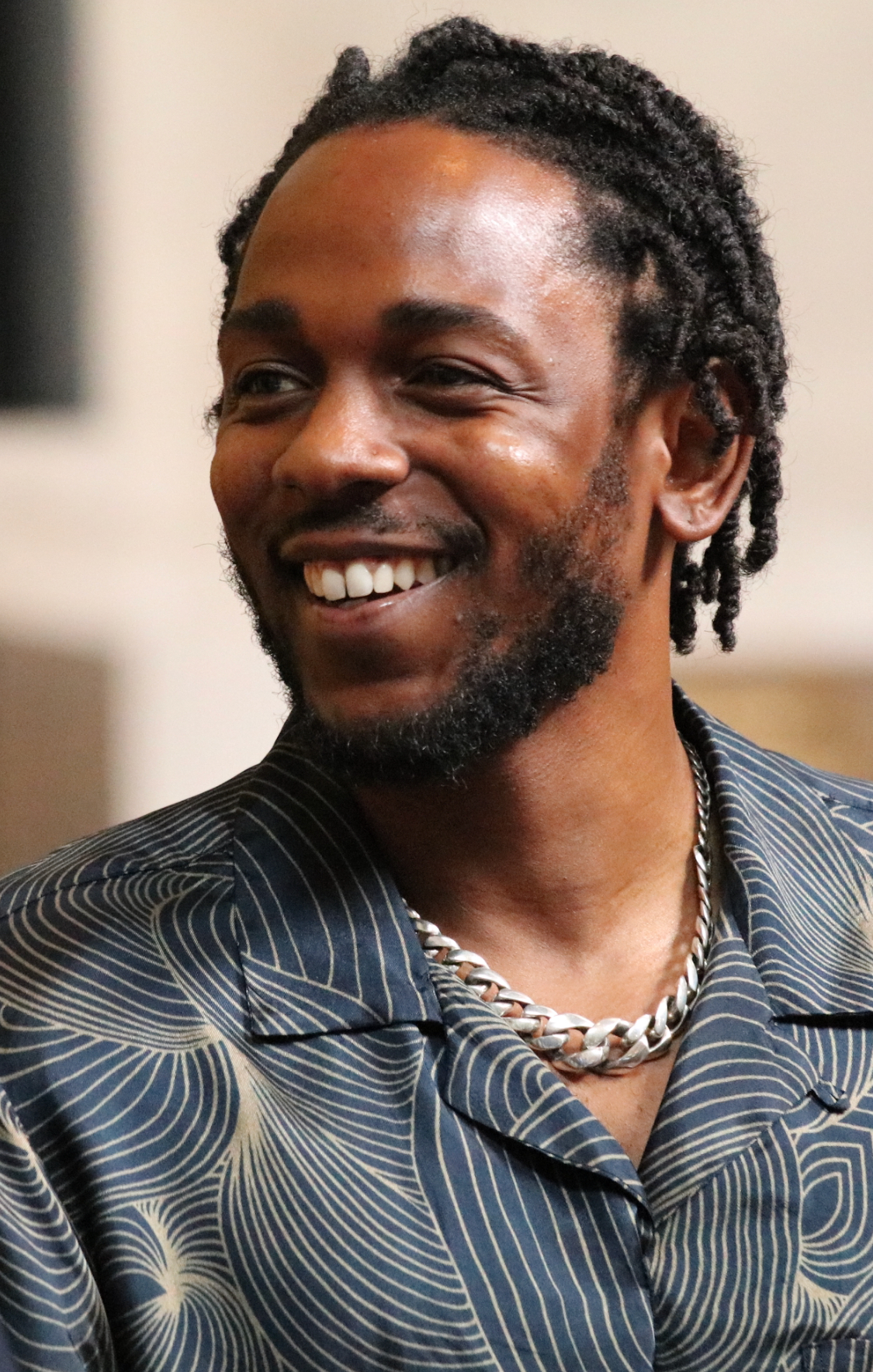
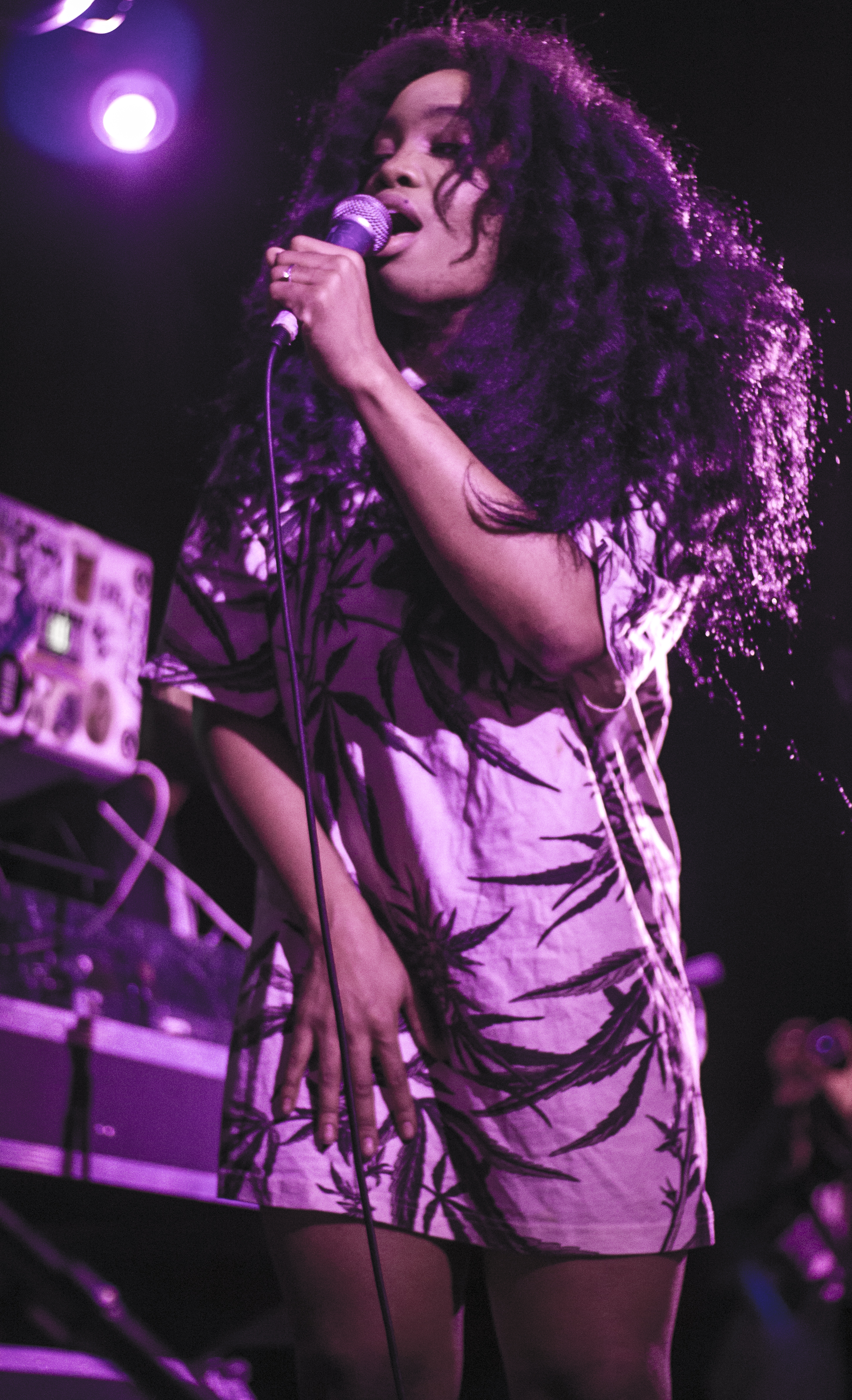
Kendrick Lamar and SZA topped the chart for 5 weeks with "All the Stars".

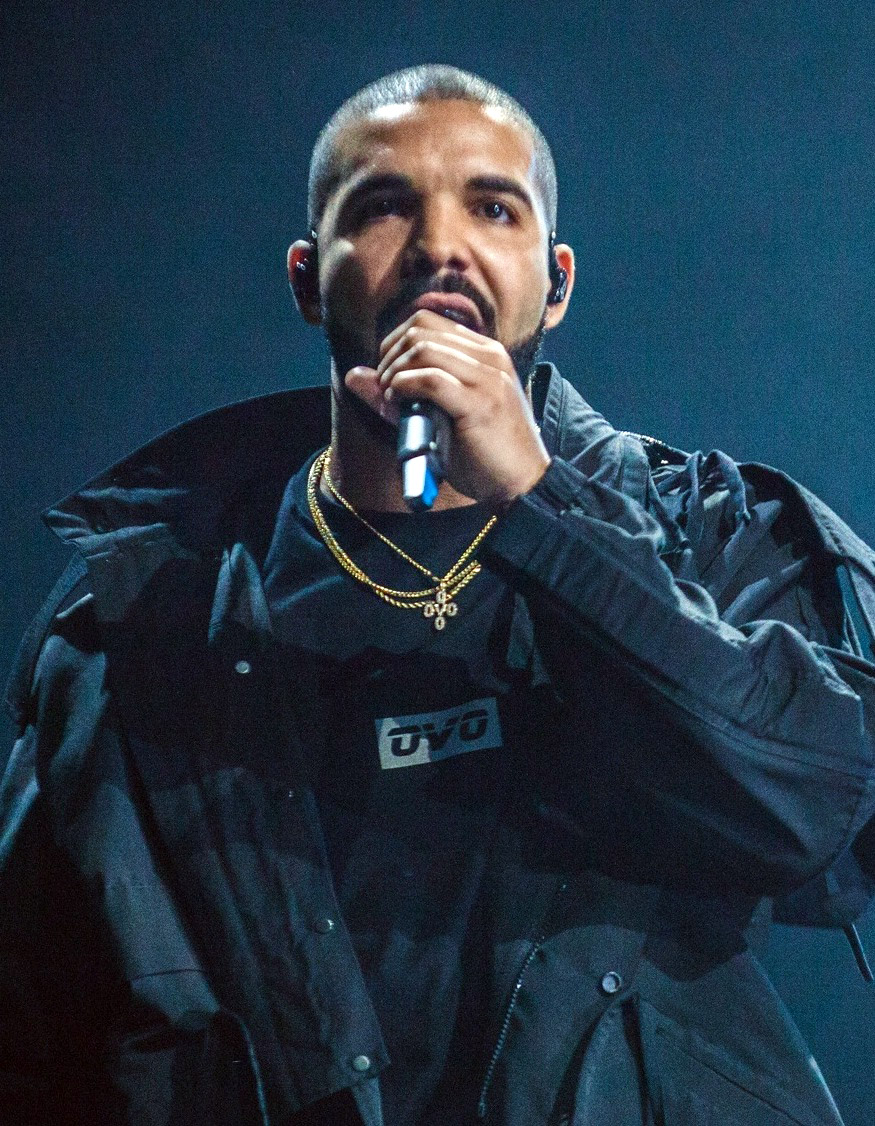
Drake topped the chart for 5 weeks with "In My Feelings".

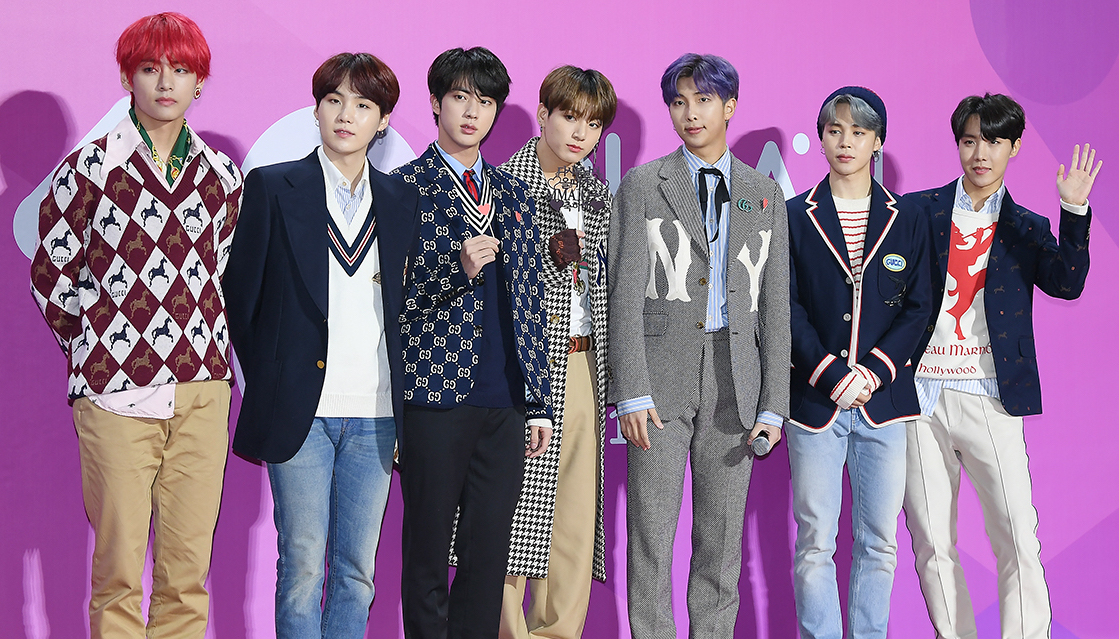
BTS topped the chart for 5 weeks with "Fake Love" and "Idol".

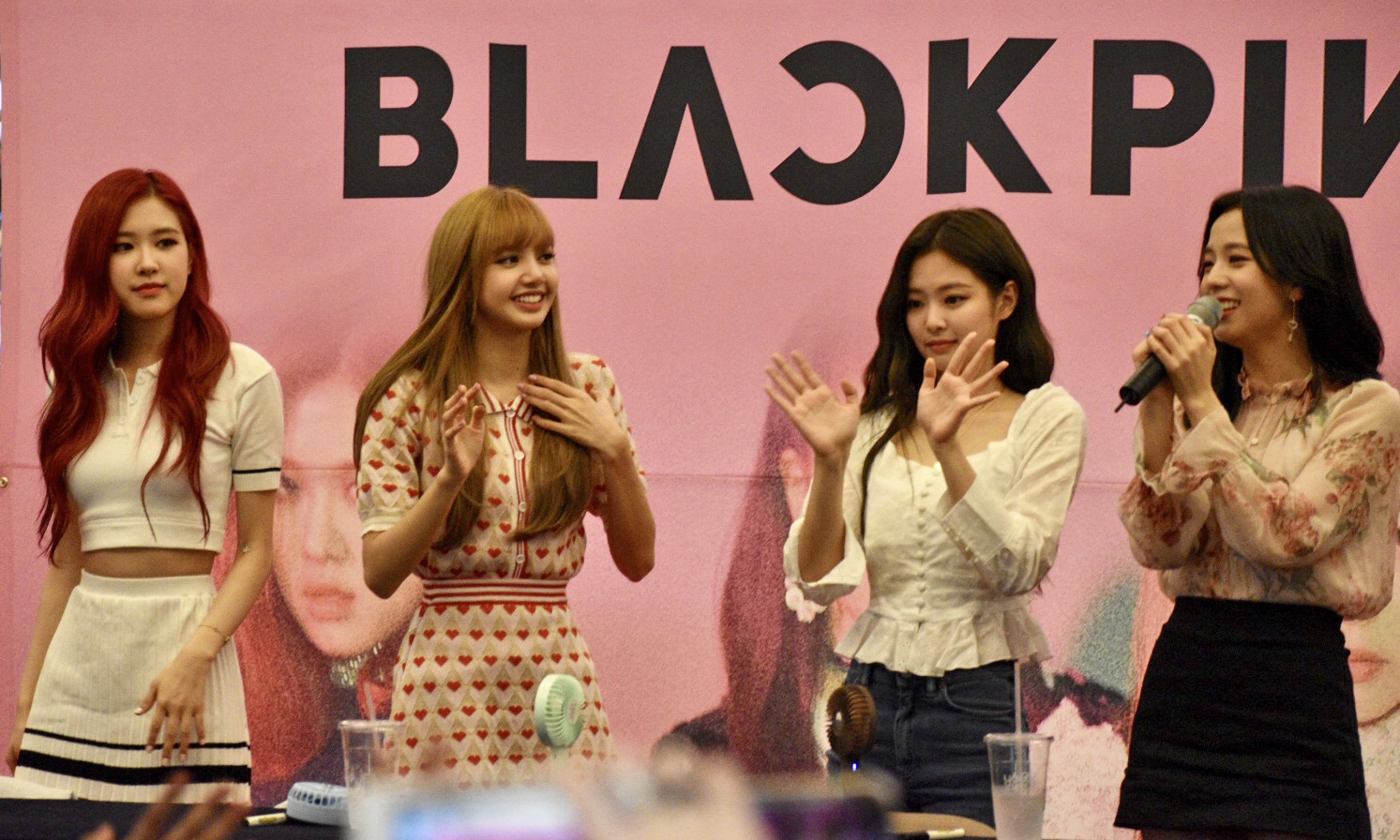
Blackpink topped the chart for 4 weeks with "Ddu-Du Ddu-Du" and "Kiss and Make Up".

Issue Date	Song	Artist(s)	Ref.
4 January	"Perfect"	Ed Sheeran	
11 January	"Perfect"	Ed Sheeran	
18 January	"Perfect"	Ed Sheeran	
1 February	"Rewrite the Stars"	Zac Efron and Zendaya	
8 February	"Rewrite the Stars"	Zac Efron and Zendaya	
15 February	"Rewrite the Stars"	Zac Efron and Zendaya	
22 February	"All the Stars"	Kendrick Lamar and SZA	
1 March	"All the Stars"	Kendrick Lamar and SZA	
8 March	"All the Stars"	Kendrick Lamar and SZA	
15 March	"All the Stars"	Kendrick Lamar and SZA	
22 March	"All the Stars"	Kendrick Lamar and SZA	
29 March	"Friends"	Marshmello and Anne-Marie	
5 April	"Friends"	Marshmello and Anne-Marie	
12 April	"The Middle"	Zedd, Maren Morris and Grey	
19 April	"The Middle"	Zedd, Maren Morris and Grey	
26 April	"No Tears Left to Cry"	Ariana Grande	
3 May	"No Tears Left to Cry"	Ariana Grande	
10 May	"No Tears Left to Cry"	Ariana Grande	
17 May	"No Tears Left to Cry"	Ariana Grande	
24 May	"Fake Love"	BTS	
31 May	"Fake Love"	BTS	
7 June	"Fake Love"	BTS	
14 June	"Girls Like You"	Maroon 5	
21 June	"Ddu-Du Ddu-Du"	Blackpink	
28 June	"Ddu-Du Ddu-Du"	Blackpink	
5 July	"Girls Like You"	Maroon 5	
12 July	"Girls Like You"	Maroon 5	
19 July	"In My Feelings"	Drake	
26 July	"In My Feelings"	Drake	
2 August	"In My Feelings"	Drake	
9 August	"In My Feelings"	Drake	
16 August	"In My Feelings"	Drake	
23 August	"Eastside"	Benny Blanco, Halsey and Khalid	
30 August	"Idol"	BTS	
6 September	"Idol"	BTS	
13 September	"Eastside"	Benny Blanco, Halsey and Khalid	
20 September	"Be Alright"	Dean Lewis	
27 September	"Be Alright"	Dean Lewis	
4 October	"Be Alright"	Dean Lewis	
11 October	"Happier"	Marshmello and Bastille	
18 October	"Happier"	Marshmello and Bastille	
25 October	"Kiss and Make Up"	Dua Lipa and Blackpink	
1 November	"Kiss and Make Up"	Dua Lipa and Blackpink	
8 November	"Thank U, Next"	Ariana Grande	
15 November	"Thank U, Next"	Ariana Grande	
22 November	"Thank U, Next"	Ariana Grande	
29 November	"Thank U, Next"	Ariana Grande	
6 December	"Thank U, Next"	Ariana Grande	
13 December	"Thank U, Next"	Ariana Grande	
20 December	"Thank U, Next"	Ariana Grande	
27 December	"Thank U, Next"	Ariana Grande	

== Number-one artists ==
List of number-one artists by total weeks at number one
Position	Artist	Weeks at No. 1
1	Ariana Grande	12
2	Kendrick Lamar	5
2	SZA	5
2	Drake	5
2	BTS	5
3	Marshmello	4
3	Blackpink	4
4	Ed Sheeran	3
4	Zac Efron	3
4	Zendaya	3
4	Maroon 5	3
4	Dean Lewis	3
5	Anne-Marie	2
5	Zedd	2
5	Maren Morris	2
5	Grey	2
5	Benny Blanco	2
5	Halsey	2
5	Khalid	2
5	Bastille	2
5	Dua Lipa	2
