= Thank U, Next (song) =

2018 single by Ariana Grande

"thank u, next"

Single by Ariana Grande

from the album thank u, next
- B-side: "imagine"
- Released: November 3, 2018
- Recorded: October 2018
- Studio: Jungle City (New York City); The Record Plant (Hollywood)
- Genre: Pop; R&B
- Length: 3:27
- Label: Republic
- Composers: Ariana Grande; Tayla Parx; Njomza Vitia; Kimberly Krysiuk; Tommy Brown; Michael Foster; Charles Anderson
- Lyricists: Ariana Grande; Victoria Monét; Tayla Parx
- Producers: Tommy Brown; Social House

Ariana Grande singles chronology
"breathin" (2018)	"thank u, next" (2018)	"7 rings" (2019)

Music video
- "thank u, next" on YouTube

"thank u, next" is a song by American singer-songwriter Ariana Grande. It was surprise-released on November 3, 2018, by Republic Records as the lead single from her fifth studio album of the same name (2019). Written by Grande, Tayla Parx and Victoria Monét, and produced by Tommy Brown, Charles Anderson, and Michael Foster, "Thank U, Next" is a celebratory ode to Grande's failed relationships, following the highly publicized breakup with her then-fiancé Pete Davidson. Considered a modern cultural phenomenon, the song's title and its lyrics spawned several catch phrases and online memes.

Grande originally wrote the song while engaged to Davidson, during a tumultuous point in their relationship. Several versions of the song were recorded due to the uncertainty of her relationship with Davidson at the time, as well as hesitation from Parx regarding whether Grande should list the names of her exes in the song's lyrics. Upon release, "Thank U, Next" was met with critical acclaim; critics praised its catchiness, lyricism and positive message. It has been listed as one of the 100 songs that defined the 2010s decade by Billboard, and was featured in several year-end and decade-end rankings. The song was also included in Rolling Stone's 2021 revision of their 500 Greatest Songs of All Time at number 137.

"thank u, next" was an immediate commercial success worldwide, reaching number one in 23 countries. With only five days of tracking, it debuted at number-one on the Billboard Hot 100, becoming Grande's first number one single in the United States. It spent seven weeks at number one in the country, and has been certified as eight-times platinum by the RIAA. The song also broke numerous streaming records upon release, including the record for the most streams received by a song in a single day for a female artist on Spotify, and the largest on-demand streaming week for a female artist ever recorded in the US.

Its music video, directed by Hannah Lux Davis, was released on November 30, 2018. The music video referenced the early 2000s' cult classic films Bring It On, Legally Blonde, Mean Girls and 13 Going on 30, and featured several celebrity cameos. It broke many viewership records, including the record for the most-watched music video on YouTube within 24 hours, with over 55.4 million views, and the largest YouTube Premiere ever at the time. The video was met with widespread critical acclaim, was highlighted as one of the pioneering moments in pop culture for 2018 and received a nomination for Video of the Year at the 2019 MTV Video Music Awards.

== Background and release ==
On November 2, 2018, Grande tweeted lyrics of a mysterious track, after her ex-fiancé, Pete Davidson, joked about their broken engagement on Saturday Night Live. The following day, she tweeted more lyrics, revealing that they indeed belong to a track named "Thank U, Next", which she described was lyrically and conceptually the opposite of her Dangerous Woman (2016) track "Knew Better". She also revealed that Thank U, Next would also be the title of her fifth album, which she had been teasing for several months on Twitter.

The song was surprise-released on November 3, 2018, without any prior official announcement or promotion. Its release late on Saturday went against the standard of Global Release Day, where most music is released midnight on Fridays.

== Composition and lyrics ==
"Thank U, Next"
Sample of the song's R&B sound, showing a "dreamy undertone" under a synth line.

"thank u, next" is a self-empowerment pop and R&B song that mentions many of Grande's past relationships. It features elements of synth-pop in its production.

The song is written in the key of B♭ minor in common time with a tempo of 107 beats per minute. The vocal melody's range is from low A♭_{3} to high E♭_{5}. Its chord progression (G♭^{maj7} – F^{7}/A – B♭^{m7} – D♭^{7}/C♭) can be considered to be a double-time variant of the chorus of Bill Withers' 1981 R&B song "Just the Two of Us", which itself can be considered a variation of the first four bars of Bobby Hebb's 1963 soul jazz song "Sunny".

Grande explained in an interview that "thank u, next..." is a phrase that she and fellow singer/songwriter Victoria Monét use. The lyrics acknowledge four of her past relationships: "Thought I'd end up with Sean/ But he wasn't a match/ Wrote some songs about Ricky/ Now I listen and laugh/ Even almost got married/ And for Pete, I'm so thankful/ Wish I could say 'Thank you' to Malcolm/ 'Cause he was an angel" refer to Big Sean, Ricky Alvarez, Pete Davidson, and the late Mac Miller, respectively.

Grande originally wrote the song while engaged to Davidson, during a tumultuous point in their relationship. Several versions of the song were recorded due to the uncertainty of her relationship with Davidson at the time. Parx urged Grande to be specific and use the names of her exes in the song. In an interview with The Zach Sang Show, Grande explained:

There's a version where I was getting married, there's a version where I'm not getting married, there's a version with nothing—we're not talking about anything. ...But we all knew that the first version was gonna be the version we ultimately went with.

Grande also revealed an alternate opening line that omitted the names of her exes: "They say I'm too young/ had too many boyfriends."

The song spawned an Internet meme, inspired by the lyrics "One taught me love/ one taught me patience/ one taught me pain". The title of the song also began to be popularly used among those on the Internet in a similar fashion to the way it is used in the song.

== Critical reception ==
"thank u, next" received widespread acclaim from music critics. Markos Papadatos from Digital Journal said the song is an "ode to gratitude, an anthem to a fresh start and new beginnings, where she is not afraid to be raw and vulnerable; Grande's vulnerability is the listener's reward." He also said the song is "sultry, cathartic and expressive" and praised Grande's breathy vocals as "pristine and heavenly, and it is evident the pop throne is still hers. 'thank u, next' garners an A rating."

Quinn Moreland from Pitchfork named the song "Best New Track" and praised Grande's ability to talk about her past relationships with newfound serenity: "She doesn't stir the pot about her recent breakup, as the common media narrative might expect; instead she finds the value in letting go. It's a generosity rarely spotted these days when it is so much more tempting to clap back with vinegar instead of honey. Much like the "one girl swaying alone" twist in Lorde's 'Liability,' it's an eloquent display of inner strength and incisive self-awareness." Spencer Kornhaber from The Atlantic said the song highlights Grande's ownership of not only the breakup gossip, but also "her romantic life, her growth as a person, and her career as a maker of catchily inspirational bops". He remarked the lyrics are "feminist rewriting of the public narrative—about a woman defined by, and perhaps even brought down by, men—pulled off with lightness. The vibe is sly and swinging; a high hat in the chorus makes like a drum crash during a stand-up roast. ... classic pop romanticism, cut with shit happens realism, spiked with trendy swagger-as-empowerment."

Brittany Spanos from Rolling Stone said despite what the title may suggest, the song is "surprisingly gracious, a balm and a sticky note reminder on the heart that sometimes it's not about life getting better; it's about wanting to better yourself" and praised Grande for delivering one of the very few pop songs to promote real, true self-love." Megan Reynolds from Jezebel stated the song is not the "anthem of a spurned lover, looking to destroy everything in her path. Instead, Grande took a page from the book of Mariah Carey: 'thank u, next' is a motivational narrative powered by pettiness". She also remarked the song works beautifully around how unbothered it is "here is pettiness for mostly good with a dash of evil, subverting the traditional spurned lover subtweet of the sort preferred by an artist like Taylor Swift. Not all music that comes out of heartbreak has to be introspective, but it is often so much better when it is. Fame rushes people towards a sort of forced maturity in many ways. Pettiness, when used for good, is quite powerful."

"thank u, next" was ranked as one of the best songs of the 2010s by several publications. Pitchfork stated the song itself works against the somewhat dismissive sentiment of the title "the twinkling chorus is steeped in a kind of corny but joyful gratitude, for the past but also for the present self. "thank u, next" might even be considered a little bit of a troll because of how it challenges the voyeurism of her situation: It would have been salacious to air an ex out for the world to see, but it is more fascinating to draw an eager audience close before offering what is merely a small token of gratitude". Dan Weiss from Consequence of Sound said Grande "regained control of her world with an amazing, off-the-cuff ditty that nipped several tabloid narratives in the bud. ... And with that she achieved unprecedented parity between chart-topping success and social-media virtuosity. Uproxx said "if everyone wrote a song as gracious and personally afforming as "thank u, next" about their ex, the breakup genre as we know it would become an uplifted" Billboard listed "thank u, next" as one of the "100 Songs that Defined the Decade", saying the song "may go down in history as the most gracious breakup song ever written". USA Today listed "Thank U, Next" as the representative song of 2018 in the list of 10 songs that defined the 2010s in music. Vice ranked "Thank U, Next" at number 23 on its list of best pop comebacks of the 21st century. In 2021, The Guardian ranked the song number eight on its list of Grande's 20 greatest songs, and in 2022, Rolling Stone ranked the song number five on its list of Grande's 50 greatest songs.

=== Year-end lists ===
Appearances on year-end lists
Publication	Rank	Ref.
Billboard	4	
The Guardian	6	
NPR	4	
Pitchfork	8	
Time	3	
Vulture	1	

=== Decade-end lists ===
Appearances on decade-end lists
Publication	Rank	Ref
Uproxx	5	
Uproxx (pop)	1	
Rolling Stone	7	
Pitchfork	48	
The Guardian (pop)	1	
Parade Magazine	14	
DiamondBack	25	
Spotify	14	
Amazon	27	
Consequence	64	
Crack Magazine	84	

=== All-time lists ===
Appearances on all-time lists
Publication	Rank	Ref
Rolling Stone	137	
Billboard	66	

== Accolades ==
Accolades for "Thank U, Next"
Year	Organization	Award	Result	Ref.
2019	iHeartRadio Music Awards	Best Lyric	Nominated	
2019	iHeartRadio Music Awards	Best Music Video	Nominated	
2019	iHeartRadio Music Awards	Song That Left Us Shook	Nominated	
2019	Nickelodeon Kids' Choice Awards	Favorite Song	Won	
2019	Denmark Gaffa-Prisen Awards	International Song of the Year	Won	
2019	Sweden Gaffa Awards	International Song of the Year	Nominated	
2019	Teen Choice Awards	Choice Pop Song	Won	
2019	MTV Video Music Awards	Video of the Year	Nominated	
2019	MTV Video Music Awards	Best Pop Video	Nominated	
2019	MTV Video Music Awards	Best Cinematography	Nominated	
2019	MTV Video Music Awards	Best Direction	Nominated	
2019	MTV Video Music Awards	Song of the Year	Nominated	
2019	MTV Europe Music Award	Best Video	Nominated	
2019	Queerty Awards	Queer Anthem	Nominated	

== Commercial performance ==
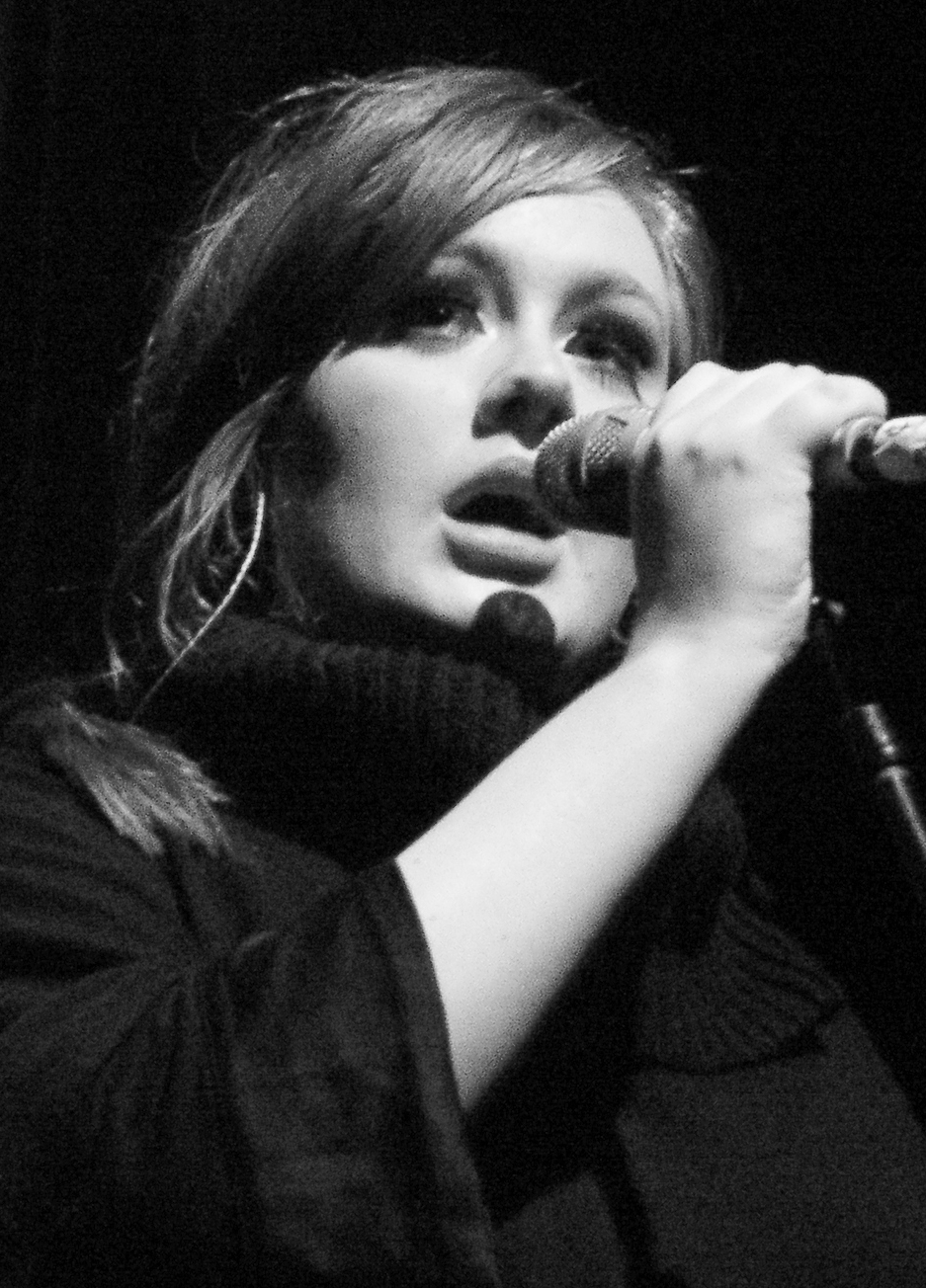
"Thank U, Next" was the first song by a female artist to debut at number one on the Billboard Hot 100 since "Hello" by Adele (pictured) in 2015.

On November 5, 2018, "Thank U, Next" broke the record for the most streams received by a song in a single day by a female artist on Spotify, with 8.19 million streams globally, and continued to break this record daily until November 9, when it received 9.6 million streams. The record was broken by Mariah Carey's "All I Want for Christmas Is You" the following month. "Thank U, Next" surpassed 100 million streams on Spotify eleven days after its release on November 14, becoming the fastest song to do so, until Grande's next single, "7 Rings", broke the record again, reaching 100 million streams on Spotify nine days after its release.

=== North America ===
"Thank U, Next" became the 32nd song to debut at number one on the US Billboard Hot 100 chart issue dated November 17, 2018, despite having an incomplete tracking week due to being released on a Saturday, contrary to music release standards of Global Release Day. Despite this, it marked Grande's first chart-topper in the country and highest-charting entry, surpassing "Problem", which peaked at number two in 2014. The single also became Grande's eleventh top-ten entry overall and her seventh to debut in the top-ten, thus surpassing Lady Gaga and Rihanna who have amassed six, among acts with the most top 10 debuts on the chart. The track became the first solo song by a female artist to top the US charts since Cardi B's "Bodak Yellow". It additionally was the first song by a lead female artist to debut atop the US charts since Adele's "Hello" in 2015. "Thank U, Next" started at the Hot 100's summit powered by its number-one debut on the Billboard Digital Songs sales chart – Grande's second to do so in 2018 and fourth overall – having sold 81,000 digital downloads according to Nielsen SoundScan, while drawing in 55.5 million US streams in its first week of availability ending November 8, allowing it to enter atop the Streaming Songs chart, becoming her first number one there as well. The song missed entering Billboard's Radio Songs chart in its first week, however drew in 11.3 million all-format radio audience impressions in the week ending November 11 due to early airplay. Grande also extended her record for being the first artist to debut within the opening ten positions of the Hot 100 chart with every lead single—"The Way", "Problem", "Dangerous Woman", "No Tears Left to Cry" and "Thank U, Next"—of her first five studio albums.

In its second week, "Thank U, Next" remained at the number one spot on the Billboard Hot 100, selling another 43,000 digital downloads, subsequently spending a second consecutive week atop the Digital Songs chart and Streaming Songs chart with 63.4 million US streams, up 14 percent from 55.5 million in its first week. "Thank U, Next" also drew in 22 million all-format radio audience impressions, a 94 percent increase from the previous week. The track also jumped to number 20 on the Billboard Mainstream Top 40 airplay chart following its number 33 debut, becoming the week's greatest gainer. It eventually became Grande's fifth number one on that chart. The song topped both the Hot 100 and Streaming Songs charts in its third week with 43.8 million US streams however dropped to number four on the Digital Songs chart selling an additional 23,000 digital downloads for the issue dated November 22, according to Nielsen Music. Airplay continued growing to 31.8 million audience impressions, up 45 percent from its second week, leading to the song debuting at number 36 on both the Radio Songs and Adult Top 40 charts, while rising to number 17 on the Mainstream Top 40. The same week, the song was certified platinum by the Recording Industry Association of America for shipments exceeding one million units in the country. "Thank U, Next" descended one position to number two on the Hot 100 in its fourth frame on the issue dated December 8, 2018, boasting just 5 percent less overall chart points than Travis Scott's "Sicko Mode" which jumped to the top spot following a Skrillex remix. Despite this it held the top slot on the Streaming Songs chart collecting another 42.5 million US streams, and rose to number 14 on the Mainstream Top 40 and number 23 on the Radio Songs as the Hot 100's top Airplay Gainer with 39.5 million audience impressions.

Following the premiere of its official music video, "Thank U, Next" returned to the top spot on the Hot 100 in its fifth-week charting. The song drew 93.8 million US streams, surpassing the record for the most streams in a single week by a female artist previously set by Taylor Swift's "Look What You Made Me Do" which collected 84.5 million streams in its debut week a year prior on September 16, 2017. The track rebounded 5–2 on the Digital Songs chart, gaining 146 percent to 43,000 downloads sold, while vaulting 23–11 on the Radio Songs with 57 million audience impressions, up 44 percent. "Thank U, Next" also became the first song since Drake's "In My Feelings" to become the week's Greatest Gainer in all three metrics (streaming, sales, and airplay) while atop the Hot 100. Additionally, it became the longest-running number-one song by a female artist in a lead role since Sia's "Cheap Thrills" featuring Sean Paul in 2016, as well as the longest-running song by a solo female artist since "Hello" by Adele spent ten weeks atop the chart in 2015–16. "Thank U, Next" has since topped the Hot 100 for a total of seven nonconsecutive weeks, being replaced by Halsey's "Without Me" on January 12, 2019. On the chart dated February 23, 2019, following the release of her album Thank U, Next, the single rose to number three, behind her singles "Break Up with Your Girlfriend, I'm Bored" (which debuted at number 2), and "7 Rings" (holding at number one for a fourth week). With these songs, Grande became the first artist since The Beatles to occupy the top three spots of the Billboard Hot 100. The track also set a new record for Grande with the most weeks spent inside the Hot 100's top ten with 17 weeks, outlasting her previous record of 16 weeks with "Problem" and "Bang Bang".

In Canada, "Thank U, Next" entered the Canadian Hot 100 chart at the top position on the issue dated November 17, 2018 where it stayed for eight nonconsecutive weeks, earning Grande her first number one single in the country and eleventh top-ten single overall. It debuted at number two on the Canadian Digital Songs Sales chart behind Lady Gaga and Bradley Cooper's "Shallow". The track remained at number one for another seven weeks, registering as the charts greatest airplay gainer in its third.

At Dance/Mix Show Airplay, "Thank U, Next" became Grande's 11th top ten. After notching her first three Dance/Mix Show Airplay top 10s in 2014, Grande sets a new best by earning her fourth top 10 of 2018.

=== Europe and Oceania ===
Throughout Europe, "Thank U, Next" achieved commercial success, debuting in the top ten of many of the nations it charted within. In the United Kingdom, the song debuted at the top of the UK Singles Chart on November 9, 2018, for the week ending date November 15, 2018, with first-week sales of 73,000 units (including 6.7 million streams) according to the Official Charts Company, becoming Grande's third chart-topper there and first since "Bang Bang" in 2014. It additionally was the first solo song by a female artist to debut at the top of the UK charts since Taylor Swift's "Look What You Made Me Do" in 2017. In its second week on the chart, the track held the number one position selling another 95,000 units, a 30.13% increase from the previous week. The song also achieved the biggest weekly UK streaming numbers of any track in 2018, drawing in 9.76 million streams during the tracking period, the highest overall weekly numbers since Luis Fonsi and Daddy Yankee's "Despacito" in May 2017. It has since remained at the number one position for an additional four weeks. Ensuing the release of its music video, the track set a new streaming record of 14.9 million streams in its fifth week, surpassing Ed Sheeran's "Shape of You" to achieve the highest weekly number of plays in the chart's history. As of March 2021, "Thank U, Next" is Grande's most streamed song in the United Kingdom and 13th most-streamed song by a female artist in the country. In Ireland, "Thank U, Next" debuted atop the Irish Singles Chart, becoming Grande's second song to do so in 2018 and third overall in the country. It remained at the top of the chart for an additional five weeks, as well as breaking the record for the biggest number of video streams ever recorded with 749,000 plays. The song has also reached the top five of the charts in Hungary, the Netherlands, Portugal, Scotland, Slovakia and Sweden, Austria and Greece, as well as the top ten in Switzerland, Iceland, Belgium, Croatia and the Czech Republic .

In Oceania, "Thank U, Next" entered at the runner-up position on the Australian ARIA Charts and the New Zealand Singles Chart, becoming her ninth and eighth top-ten single on both charts, respectively. It started at number three on the Australian Digital Sales chart, while also entering atop the ARIA streaming charts as the top streamed song in the country. The song ascended to the top position in its second week on the ARIA Singles Chart, becoming Grande's second number one single there. Similarly in New Zealand, the track topped the nations chart the following week, becoming her second single to do so following "Problem". The song spent an additional five weeks at number one on both the ARIA Singles Chart and the New Zealand Singles Chart, becoming Grande's longest-running number one single in both countries.

== Music video ==
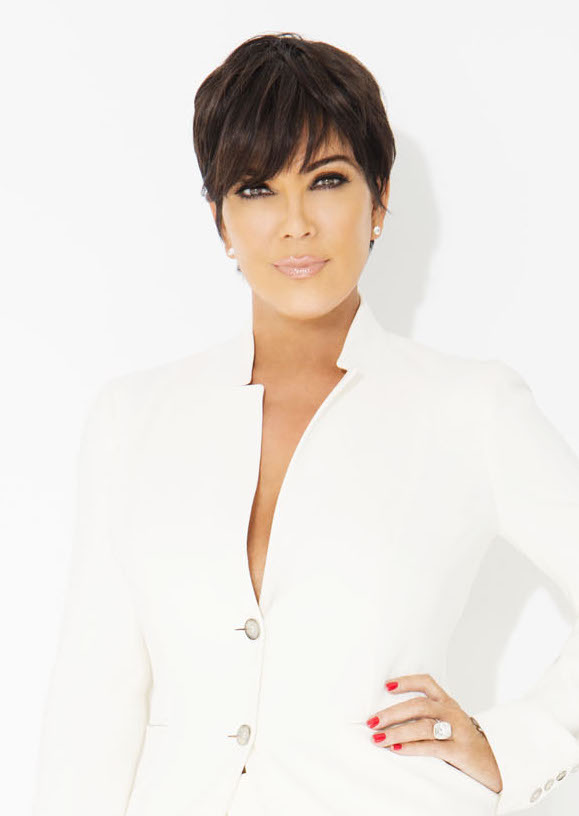
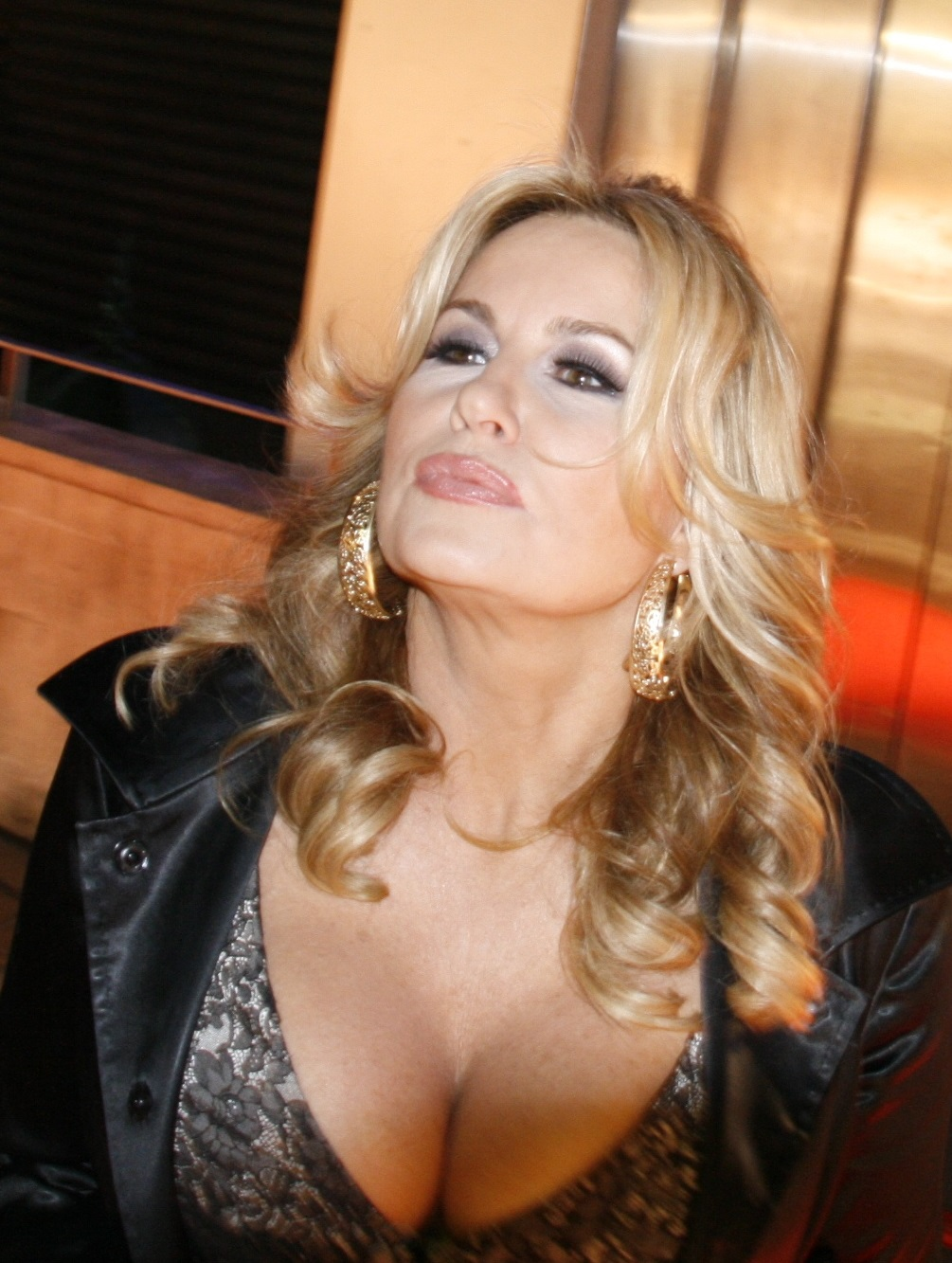
The music video for "Thank U, Next" features a plethora of cameo appearances, such as from TV personality Kris Jenner (left), and appearances from original cast members from referenced films, such as actress Jennifer Coolidge (right) from Legally Blonde.

Planning for the music video began long before the song was released. During work on Grande's music video for her song "Breathin", director Hannah Lux Davis listened to a demo for "Thank U, Next", in which she praised the song. Because of this, both Davis and Grande started coming up with concepts for the video, bringing up their love for films such as Mean Girls and Bring It On. Production began immediately from the release of the "Breathin" video. She announced that the video would reference four of the most successful teen movies of the 2000s: Mean Girls, Bring It On, Legally Blonde, and 13 Going on 30.

She also considered adding other memorable 2000s teen movies, such as A Cinderella Story, Crossroads, and She's the Man, but declined. Grande began teasing the music video on her Instagram account on November 20. Later that day, she shared more images including one with actress Jennifer Coolidge, who starred in the Legally Blonde. On November 22, Grande posted a photo of herself in a cheerleader's outfit, alongside a quote from the movie Bring It On. On November 27, Grande released a teaser video featuring cameos from singer-songwriter Troye Sivan, YouTube stars Colleen Ballinger and Gabi DeMartino, Mean Girls actors Jonathan Bennett and Stefanie Drummond, and Grande's former Victorious co-stars Elizabeth Gillies, Daniella Monet and Matt Bennett.

The video made its official premiere on YouTube on November 30 through a new feature called "YouTube Premiere".

=== Cameo appearances ===
List of cameo appearances who appeared in the music video:

- Colleen Ballinger
- Jonathan Bennett (from Mean Girls)
- Stefanie Drummond (from Mean Girls)
- Matt Bennett
- Jennifer Coolidge (from Legally Blonde)
- Gabi DeMartino
- Elizabeth Gillies
- Kris Jenner
- Daniella Monet
- Victoria Monét
- Tayla Parx
- Troye Sivan

=== Synopsis ===
The video references the 2000s films Mean Girls, Bring It On, 13 Going on 30 and Legally Blonde.

The music video begins with an intro featuring different singers, actors and YouTube personalities including American YouTuber Colleen Ballinger, American actors Jonathan Bennett and Stefanie Drummond, Grande's backup dancer Scott Nicholson, Australian singer Troye Sivan and American singer Gabi DeMartino, parodying the montage in Mean Girls where many high school students are talking about Regina George, the leader of school clique, The Plastics. Some of the actors from the original movie appear in this scene. In the first few seconds of the video, the instrumental for what would be Grande's next single, "7 Rings", can be heard in the background. The words "Thank U, Next" are then shown on the screen in the same font as the title card of Mean Girls (2004). It then features a close-up of a book, similar to the "Burn Book" (also from Mean Girls), containing images and writing showing and talking about Grande's past relationships with images of American rapper Big Sean, the singer's former backup dancer Ricky Alvarez and American comedian Pete Davidson, all in the book; only Mac Miller, despite being quoted in the song, is not shown in a photo, respecting his death. The video then follows Grande as Regina George among The Plastics (formed by Elizabeth Gillies as Cady, Alexa Luria as Karen, and Courtney Chipolone as Gretchen, as well as Jonathan Bennett in his original role as Aaron) walking down the hall, another reference to Mean Girls. The next clip shows Grande dancing with Gilles, Luria and Chipolone in Mrs. Claus-inspired dresses, with an appearance by Grande's mother (portrayed by Kris Jenner in reference to the role of Amy Poehler), filming the dance on her home video camera, except mirroring Poehler's original dance moves.

The next clip is set in a bathroom and shows Grande, as Torrance, and her love interest Cliff (portrayed by Matt Bennett) brushing their teeth, similar to a scene from the movie Bring It On (2000), which then transitions to Grande cheerleading among others including Daniella Monet versing against the other team, including singer-songwriters Victoria Monét and Tayla Parx, who are contributing the background vocals in the track. The scene then moves to Grande helping out with a wedding, where she appears as Jenna playing with a dollhouse reminiscent to a scene in 13 Going on 30 (2004). A magic-like transition moves into the following scene where Grande drives a convertible with the license plate which reads "7 RINGS", foreshadowing the next single from her Thank U, Next album. In the next scene, Grande hops out of the vehicle with her dog, Toulouse Grande, in a pink leather jacket, referencing Elle Woods from Legally Blonde (2001). The camera spans to multiple shots of Grande walking down a path with a shot of her at a swimming pool, another reference to the film. Another reference to the movie follows as the music pauses to show a scene of Grande at the beauty salon with the manicurist Paulette (portrayed by Jennifer Coolidge in her original role) talking about past relationships of how "big front teeth" can affect someone's look; the whole scene involves many re-enactments of other Legally Blonde scenes including the "Bend and Snap". Several shots of Grande are shown running on the treadmill, with all scenes previously in the video then completed in to one involving some behind-the-scene shots and a scene with Coolidge and the UPS delivery man meeting (the role was originally portrayed by Bruce Thomas) referencing another scene which is from the original film. The video then concludes with Grande and the cheerleaders dancing, the singer leaving a red lipstick trace by kissing Ballinger's pregnant stomach and Jenner, whilst holding the camera, saying "Thank you, next, bitch!" in the ultimate shot.

=== Reception ===
During the premiere of the music video on YouTube, it was reported that a total of 829,000 viewers were watching and participating in the live stream, marking YouTube Premiere's largest viewership since the feature launched. Following its release, the video broke the record for most-watched music video on YouTube within 24 hours, officially achieving 55.4 million views on the platform on its first day, surpassing the 45.9 million views of BTS' "Idol" video, the previous record-holder. The record was later overtaken by Blackpink with their song "Kill This Love" in April 2019, with 56.7 million views.

The "Thank U, Next" music video was praised by critics. Esther Zuckerman of Thrillist stated in her review, "what Grande is doing -- as she has done with her conversational Twitter account -- is inviting her fans into sisterhood where everyone knows what it means to be "flirty, and thirty, and thriving" and where the "limit does not exist." Just like a good rom-com, it's impossible to resist". Matt Gallatin of The Michigan Daily praised the music video's pop culture references, stating that "Ariana literally becomes pop culture, and pop culture becomes her." Stars from the referenced films praised Grande along with the music video; Reese Witherspoon, the lead actress from Legally Blonde praised the video, particularly the iconic "bend and snap" scene that was reenacted in the video. Jennifer Garner of 13 Going on 30 stated in her Instagram page, "every now and then something comes along and just brightens your day. Ariana Grande you're adorable. Thank you, pretty girl."

== Live performances ==
Grande performed the song alongside its co-writers Victoria Monét and Tayla Parx on The Ellen DeGeneres Show on November 7, 2018. The performance paid homage to Grande's favorite movie, The First Wives Club (1996), recreating a scene in which the three leading female characters "clad in white suits [and] team up to sing an anthem of freedom in the wake of a life-changing breakup, bidding adieu to the men of their past and ushering in a new age of independence and personal growth." She later performed the song on December 6, 2018, at Billboard Women in Music, an annual event held by Billboard to recognize women in the music industry, where she received the award for Woman of the Year. The song also served as the encore on her Sweetener World Tour. During the third leg of the tour, Grande wore a Mrs. Claus-inspired outfit, similar to the music video. Grande also performed the song at the 2020 Grammy Awards in a medley with "7 Rings" and "Imagine". "Thank U, Next" was later performed during the Eternal Sunshine Tour (2026).

== Cultural impact ==
Upon release, "Thank U, Next" became a cultural phenomenon, inspiring viral tweets, memes and catch phrases on the Internet. The song's title and lyrics were used and talked about extensively by news outlets, protestors and commentators, while its unexpected release was also discussed. Vanity Fair wrote: "The memes are perhaps the clearest measure of its cultural pervasiveness, and of Grande's place in pop culture." and compared the song's cultural impact to musical film A Star Is Born and rapper Drake in the same year. Elle described "Thank U, Next" as "a revolutionary kind of breakup anthem" and added that the song "shows young people are taking a much more optimistic view of breakups than generations past". Quartz observed that "Thank U, Next" was "constantly streaming, at parties, hangouts, and on commutes" due to its popularity and wrote that "[Grande] widens the emotional possibilities for women going through heartbreak--revealing the multiplicity of our romantic and sexual preferences" throughout the song. During the 2019 Women's March, attendees held up posters and signs with political spins using the song's catch phrase lyrics.The Guardian called the song "a powerful cultural moment". The song was also included in Rolling Stone's 2021 revision of their 500 Greatest Songs of All Time, calling it "a song that floats with strength and grace, offering a sage perspective on the work of moving on, from a place of profound centeredness".

Its music video was praised by critics and is considered one of 2018's most significant pop culture events. In Adweek's opinion, the viral music video created "the sort of mass-market cultural event that has become increasingly rare since the heyday of MTV" and also cited it as an example of "how a carefully-crafted marketing strategy can deliver big results and used principles and best practices that are useful for marketers in any category". Wired and USA Today listed "Thank U, Next" among the best music and pop culture moments of 2018. Hannah Lux Davis, the music video's director, praised Grande's contributions to the song: "[Grande] was redefining what a breakup song could be. She put this really positive, fun, empowered twist on it, which I feel like hadn't really been tapped into this specifically". In 2022, Jennifer Coolidge credited Grande and the "Thank U, Next" music video for revitalizing her career.

The song's surprise release without any prior announcement or promotion was discussed by some publications. While addressing the recently noticed "surprise-release-fatigue", Rolling Stone's Elias Leight opined that the fatigue did not apply to Grande, following the song's record-breaking performance on streaming platforms, which Leight considered remarkable, due to streaming being dominated by rap music. "Thank U, Next" was also considered as an unconventional breakup song, for directly name-dropping Grande's exes and serving as a celebratory ode to them. The Guardian's Ann-Derrick Gaillot felt Grande created a "new kind of break up song". Gaillot stated that "in this year's most popular breakup song, 'Thank U, Next', we know exactly whom Ariana Grande is singing about. Also singing about more than one ex, she identifies them in the opening lyrics...her motive is to praise, not condemn." In 2022, Insider named it the twelfth greatest breakup song of the 21st century, stating that " there has never been a song like "Thank U, Next," one that casually name-drops a superstar's exes — not for shade or shock value, but to celebrate radical honesty and resilience, even in the face of unimaginable loss." E! News and Billboard have considered "Thank U, Next" as one of the best breakup songs of all time.

The song has been described as an inspiration for many artists such as Sufjan Stevens, whose eighth studio album The Ascension was influenced by it; in an interview with Vanity Fair, he said: "I think that the Ariana Grande song kind of woke me up, 'Thank U, Next'. It seems like she was tonally able to balance an understanding of a situation and of the value of [seeing] things diplomatically—but was also so over it."

== Track listing ==
- Digital download
1. "Thank U, Next" – 3:27
- 7" vinyl
1. "Thank U, Next" – 3:27
2. "Imagine" – 3:31

== Credits and personnel ==
Credits and personnel adapted from the album's liner notes.

Recording and management

- Recorded at Jungle City Studios (New York City) and The Record Plant (Hollywood, California)
- Mixed at MixStar Studios (Virginia Beach, Virginia)
- Mastered at Sterling Sound (New York City)
- Published by Universal Music Group Corp. (ASCAP), GrandAri Music (ASCAP), Victoria Monét Music Publishing (ASCAP), Taylor Monét Music/Warner Chappell (BMI) and District 1-12/Avex Music Publishing (ASCAP)

Production

- Ariana Grande – vocals, songwriting, vocal producer
- Victoria Monét – background vocals, songwriter, vocal producer
- Tayla Parx – background vocals, songwriter
- Njomza Vitia – songwriting
- Kimberly Krysiuk – songwriting
- Tommy Brown – songwriting, producer
- Michael Foster – songwriting, producer
- Charles Anderson – songwriting, producer
- Billy Hickey – engineer
- Brendan Morawski – engineer
- Sean Klein – assistant engineer
- Şerban Ghenea – mixing
- John Hanes – mixing assistant
- Randy Merrill – mastering

== Charts ==
=== Weekly charts ===
Weekly chart performance
Chart (2018–2020)	Peak position
Argentina (Argentina Hot 100)	31
Australia (ARIA)	1
Austria (Ö3 Austria Top 40)	4
Belgium (Ultratop 50 Flanders)	7
Belgium (Ultratop 50 Wallonia)	3
Bolivia (Monitor Latino)	3
Brazil (Top 100 Brasil)	65
Bulgaria (PROPHON)	7
Canada Hot 100 (Billboard)	1
Canada CHR/Top 40 (Billboard)	2
Canada Hot AC (Billboard)	14
Colombia (National-Report)	72
Croatia (HRT)	1
Czech Republic Singles Digital (ČNS IFPI)	6
Costa Rica (Monitor Latino)	3
Denmark (Tracklisten)	3
Estonia (Eesti Tipp-40)	1
Finland (Suomen virallinen lista)	1
France (SNEP)	12
France Airplay (SNEP)	9
Germany (GfK)	13
Global 200 (Billboard)	189
Greece International (IFPI)	1
Guatemala (Monitor Latino)	6
Hungary (Single Top 40)	3
Hungary (Stream Top 40)	1
Iceland (Tónlistinn)	1
Ireland (IRMA)	1
Italy (FIMI)	24
Israel (Media Forest)	1
Japan (Japan Hot 100)	24
Latvia (LAIPA)	1
Lebanon (OLT20)	1
Lithuania (AGATA)	1
Malaysia (RIM)	1
Mexico (Billboard Mexican Airplay)	1
Netherlands (Dutch Top 40)	3
Netherlands (Mega Top 50)	1
Netherlands (Single Top 100)	3
New Zealand (Recorded Music NZ)	1
Norway (VG-lista)	2
Panama (Monitor Latino)	19
Portugal (AFP)	1
Puerto Rico (Monitor Latino)	12
Romania (Airplay 100)	46
Scottish Singles Sales (Official Charts)	2
Singapore (RIAS)	1
Slovakia Airplay (ČNS IFPI)	14
Slovakia Singles Digital (ČNS IFPI)	1
Slovenia (SloTop50)	20
South Korea (Gaon)	14
Spain (Promusicae)	24
Sweden (Sverigetopplistan)	3
Switzerland (Schweizer Hitparade)	7
UK Singles (Official Charts)	1
US Billboard Hot 100	1
US Adult Contemporary (Billboard)	22
US Adult Pop Airplay (Billboard)	7
US Dance Club Songs (Billboard)	1
US Dance Airplay (Billboard)	3
US Pop Airplay (Billboard)	1
US Rhythmic Airplay (Billboard)	15
US Rolling Stone Top 100	85
Venezuela (National-Report)	45

=== Monthly charts ===
Monthly chart performance
Chart (2018)	Peak position
Brazil Streaming (Pro-Música Brasil)	16
South Korea (Gaon)	15

=== Year-end charts ===
2018 year-end chart performance for "Thank U, Next"
Chart (2018)	Position
Australia (ARIA)	60
Hungary (Single Top 40)	95
Hungary (Stream Top 40)	51
Netherlands (Dutch Top 40)	68
Netherlands (Mega Top 50)	100
Netherlands (Single Top 100)	86
Portugal (AFP)	101
South Korea International (Gaon)	40
Taiwan (Hito Radio)	9
UK Singles (OCC)	68

2019 year-end chart performance for "Thank U, Next"
Chart (2019)	Position
Australia (ARIA)	34
Belgium (Ultratop Flanders)	61
Belgium (Ultratop Wallonia)	63
Canada (Canadian Hot 100)	11
Denmark (Tracklisten)	88
France (SNEP)	139
Hungary (Stream Top 40)	43
Iceland (Tónlistinn)	45
Ireland (IRMA)	33
New Zealand (Recorded Music NZ)	28
Portugal (AFP)	63
South Korea (Gaon)	52
UK Singles (OCC)	30
US Billboard Hot 100	12
US Adult Top 40 (Billboard)	31
US Dance Club Songs (Billboard)	39
US Dance/Mix Show Airplay (Billboard)	19
US Mainstream Top 40 (Billboard)	13
US Rolling Stone Top 100	18

=== Decade-end charts ===
Decade-end chart performance
Chart (2010–2019)	Position
US Billboard Hot 100	75

== Certifications ==
Certifications
Region	Certification	Certified units/sales
Australia (ARIA)	10× Platinum	700,000^{‡}
Austria (IFPI Austria)	Platinum	30,000^{‡}
Belgium (BRMA)	Platinum	40,000^{‡}
Brazil (Pro-Música Brasil)	4× Diamond	640,000^{‡}
Canada (Music Canada)	9× Platinum	720,000^{‡}
Denmark (IFPI Danmark)	Platinum	90,000^{‡}
France (SNEP)	Diamond	333,333^{‡}
Germany (BVMI)	Gold	200,000^{‡}
Italy (FIMI)	Platinum	50,000^{‡}
Mexico (AMPROFON)	Gold	30,000^{‡}
New Zealand (RMNZ)	5× Platinum	150,000^{‡}
Norway (IFPI Norway)	3× Platinum	180,000^{‡}
Poland (ZPAV)	3× Platinum	150,000^{‡}
Portugal (AFP)	2× Platinum	20,000^{‡}
South Korea (KMCA)	Platinum	2,500,000^{*}
Spain (Promusicae)	Platinum	60,000^{‡}
Switzerland (IFPI Switzerland)	Platinum	20,000^{‡}
United Kingdom (BPI)	3× Platinum	1,800,000
United States (RIAA)	8× Platinum	8,000,000^{‡}
Streaming
Japan (RIAJ)	Gold	50,000,000^{†}
Sweden (GLF)	2× Platinum	16,000,000^{†}
South Korea (KMCA)	Platinum	100,000,000^{†}
^{*} Sales figures based on certification alone.^{‡} Sales+streaming figures based on certification alone.^{†} Streaming-only figures based on certification alone.

== Release history ==
Release dates and formats
Region	Date	Format(s)	Label	Ref.
Various	November 4, 2018	Digital download; streaming	Republic	
United States	November 13, 2018	Contemporary hit radio	Republic	
United States	November 20, 2018	Rhythmic contemporary radio	Republic	
United States	November 20, 2018	Hot adult contemporary radio	Republic	
Italy	November 14, 2018	Radio airplay	Universal	
Various	March 29, 2019	Vinyl	Republic	

== See also ==
- List of number-one singles of 2018 (Australia)
- List of number-one streaming tracks of 2018 (Australia)
- List of Canadian Hot 100 number-one singles of 2018
- List of Canadian Hot 100 number-one singles of 2019
- List of number-one singles of 2018 (Ireland)
- List of number-one singles of 2018 (Portugal)
- List of number-one songs of 2018 (Malaysia)
- List of number-one singles from the 2010s (New Zealand)
- List of number-one songs of 2018 (Singapore)
- List of UK Singles Chart number ones of the 2010s
- List of UK Singles Downloads Chart number ones of the 2010s
- List of Billboard Hot 100 number ones of 2018
- List of Billboard Hot 100 number ones of 2019
- List of Billboard Hot 100 top 10 singles in 2018
- List of number-one digital songs of 2018 (U.S.)
- List of number-one Billboard Streaming Songs of 2018
