= List of number-one songs of 2018 (Malaysia) =

Below is a list of songs that topped the RIM Charts in 2018 according to the Recording Industry Association of Malaysia.

== Chart history ==
Issue Date	International & Domestic songs			Domestic songs		
Issue Date	Song	Artist(s)	Ref.	Song	Artist(s)	Ref.
4 January	"Perfect"	Ed Sheeran		"Pematah Hati"	Nabila Razali	
11 January	"Perfect"	Ed Sheeran		"Pematah Hati"	Nabila Razali	
18 January	"Perfect"	Ed Sheeran		"Pematah Hati"	Nabila Razali	
25 January	"Perfect"	Ed Sheeran		"Pematah Hati"	Nabila Razali	
1 February	"Perfect"	Ed Sheeran		"Pematah Hati"	Nabila Razali	
8 February	"Perfect"	Ed Sheeran		"Bunga"	Ara Johari	
15 February	"Perfect"	Ed Sheeran		"Bunga"	Ara Johari	
22 February	"All the Stars"	Kendrick Lamar with SZA		"Bunga"	Ara Johari	
1 March	"All the Stars"	Kendrick Lamar with SZA		"Bunga"	Ara Johari	
8 March	"All the Stars"	Kendrick Lamar with SZA		"Bunga"	Ara Johari	
15 March	"All the Stars"	Kendrick Lamar with SZA		"Kata Akhirmu"	Ariff Bahran	
22 March	"Friends"	Marshmello and Anne-Marie		"Luar Biasa"	Ismail Izzani ft. Alif	
29 March	"Friends"	Marshmello and Anne-Marie		"Luar Biasa"	Ismail Izzani ft. Alif	
5 April	"Call Out My Name"	The Weeknd		"Di Matamu"	Sufian Suhaimi	
12 April	"Di Matamu"	Sufian Suhaimi		"Di Matamu"	Sufian Suhaimi	
19 April	"Call Out My Name"	The Weeknd		"Di Matamu"	Sufian Suhaimi	
26 April	"No Tears Left to Cry"	Ariana Grande		"Di Matamu"	Sufian Suhaimi	
3 May	"No Tears Left to Cry"	Ariana Grande		"Di Matamu"	Sufian Suhaimi	
10 May	"No Tears Left to Cry"	Ariana Grande		"Di Matamu"	Sufian Suhaimi	
17 May	"No Tears Left to Cry"	Ariana Grande		"Di Matamu"	Sufian Suhaimi	
24 May	"Fake Love"	BTS		"Di Matamu"	Sufian Suhaimi	
31 May	"Fake Love"	BTS		"Di Matamu"	Sufian Suhaimi	
14 June	"Girls Like You"	Maroon 5		—N/a		
21 June	"Ddu-Du Ddu-Du"	Blackpink		"Di Matamu"	Sufian Suhaimi	
28 June	"Girls Like You"	Maroon 5		"Tak Pernah Hilang"	Amylea & Kaer	
5 July	"Girls Like You"	Maroon 5		"Tak Pernah Hilang"	Amylea & Kaer	
12 July	"Girls Like You"	Maroon 5		"Di Matamu"	Sufian Suhaimi	
19 July	"In My Feelings"	Drake		"Di Matamu"	Sufian Suhaimi	
26 July	"In My Feelings"	Drake		"Kisah Antara Kita"	One Avenue Band	
2 August	"In My Feelings"	Drake		"Kisah Antara Kita"	One Avenue Band	
9 August	"In My Feelings"	Drake		"Sampai Bila"	Misha Omar	
16 August	"Girls Like You"	Maroon 5		"Kisah Antara Kita"	One Avenue Band	
23 August	"You Are the Reason"	Calum Scott		"Kisah Antara Kita"	One Avenue Band	
30 August	"Idol"	BTS		"Kisah Antara Kita"	One Avenue Band	
6 September	"Idol"	BTS		"Kisah Antara Kita"	One Avenue Band	
13 September	"Idol"	BTS		"Kisah Antara Kita"	One Avenue Band	
20 September	"You Are the Reason"	Calum Scott		"Kisah Antara Kita"	One Avenue Band	
27 September	"You Are the Reason"	Calum Scott		"Kisah Antara Kita"	One Avenue Band	
4 October	"You Are the Reason"	Calum Scott		"Kisah Antara Kita"	One Avenue Band	
11 October	"You Are the Reason"	Calum Scott		"Kisah Antara Kita"	One Avenue Band	
18 October	"You Are the Reason"	Calum Scott		"Ragaman"	Faizal Tahir	
25 October	"Kiss and Make Up"	Dua Lipa and Blackpink		"Ragaman"	Faizal Tahir	
1 November	"Waste It on Me"	Steve Aoki featuring BTS		"Bidadari"	Ismail Izzani	
8 November	"Thank U, Next"	Ariana Grande		"Ragaman"	Faizal Tahir	
15 November	"Thank U, Next"	Ariana Grande		"Ragaman"	Faizal Tahir	
22 November	"Thank U, Next"	Ariana Grande		"Ragaman"	Faizal Tahir	
29 November	"Thank U, Next"	Ariana Grande		"Satu Peluang"	Andi Bernadee	
6 December	"Thank U, Next"	Ariana Grande		"Pulang"	Insomniacks	
13 December	"Thank U, Next"	Ariana Grande		"Pulang"	Insomniacks	
20 December	"Thank U, Next"	Ariana Grande		"Pulang"	Insomniacks	
27 December	"Sunflower"	Post Malone and Swae Lee		"Pulang"	Insomniacks	
