= All the Stars =

2018 single by Kendrick Lamar and SZA

Single by Kendrick Lamar and SZA

from the album Black Panther: The Album
- Released: January 5, 2018
- Recorded: 2017
- Genre: Pop-rap; R&B; hip-hop
- Length: 3:55 (single version); 3:52 (album version)
- Label: Top Dawg; Aftermath; Interscope
- Songwriters: Kendrick Duckworth; Mark Spears; Al Shuckburgh; Solána Rowe; Anthony Tiffith
- Producers: Sounwave; Al Shux

Kendrick Lamar singles chronology
"Love" (2017)	"All the Stars" (2018)	"Don't Don't Do It" (2018)

SZA singles chronology
"The Weekend" (2017)	"All the Stars" (2018)	"Broken Clocks" (2018)

Music video
- "All the Stars" on YouTube

"All the Stars" is a song by American rapper Kendrick Lamar and American singer SZA. Written alongside Anthony "Top Dawg" Tiffith and producers Sounwave and Al Shux, the song was released on January 5, 2018, as the lead single to the soundtrack album of the film Black Panther. Its release coincided with Top Dawg Entertainment's announcement that Tiffith (its president) and Lamar would be producing the Black Panther soundtrack album. Marvel Studios confirmed the news and revealed that Lamar was hand-picked by Black Panther's director Ryan Coogler to produce the soundtrack album. The song appeared in the movie's end credits.

"All the Stars" received numerous accolades and nominations including a nomination for Best Original Song at the 76th Golden Globe Awards and the 91st Academy Awards, as well as receiving four nominations at the 61st Grammy Awards including Record of the Year and Song of the Year.

"All the Stars" won Best Song at the African-American Film Critics Association, while its video won Best Visual Effects at the 2018 MTV Video Music Awards.

== Background ==
Lamar first hinted at his involvement with the Black Panther soundtrack album in the music video for his song "Love", released on December 22, 2017. In the video, at about 1:54 into the song, a clapperboard is shown with the words "B.Panther Soundtrack Coming Soon". Lamar subsequently announced his involvement on January 4, 2018, along with the release of "All the Stars".

== Release ==
Upon its release, Lamar announced his praise for Black Panther and its director, Ryan Coogler, writing "the magnitude of [the] film showcases a great marriage of art and culture. I'm truly honored to contribute my knowledge of producing sound and writing music alongside Ryan and Marvel's vision."

== Reception ==
"All the Stars" received positive reviews from critics. Jon Blistein of Rolling Stone praised the song, calling Lamar's verse "defiant" and SZA's verse "enthralling" and "filled with vocal turns". However, Sheldon Pearce of Pitchfork gave the song a negative review, calling it "generic" and "pales in comparison to [Lamar and SZA's] recent works". Pearce further wrote that the song is "full of heavy-handed plotting and everyman cliches" and is "so nondescript that it reeks of compromise, devoid of personality or any true vision." Although Pearce complimented Lamar and SZA's performances and the "slick production", he ultimately wrote that "'All the Stars' is uncharacteristically conservative for these two stars, all in service of a bigger picture."

In December 2018, Billboard ranked "All the Stars" as the 15th best song of the year.

== Chart performance ==
In the week ending January 20, 2018, "All the Stars" debuted at number 43 on the Billboard Hot 100. For the week ending March 3, 2018, the single reached number seven on the Hot 100. It is Lamar's second top-ten hit on the chart in 2018, following his collaboration with the Weeknd on "Pray for Me", which reached number seven in early February. It also became SZA's second top-ten hit on the chart following her collaboration with Maroon 5 on the single "What Lovers Do". On the Hot R&B/Hip-Hop Songs chart, "All the Stars" debuted at number 19 and stayed in the top 20 for three weeks. In its fifth week, it reached number five on the chart.

Worldwide, the song peaked at number one in Malaysia, Mexico, Singapore, and Slovakia. The song reached the top ten in Australia, Canada, Hungary, Ireland, New Zealand, Norway, Sweden, and the United Kingdom.

The song is certified diamond in France and Brazil.

== Music video ==
The music video for the song was filmed in January 2018 and released to Lamar's Vevo channel on YouTube on February 6, 2018. It was directed by Dave Meyers and the Little Homies. As of September 2025, the video has over 583 million views.

The video features themes and images of Afrocentrism and Afrofuturism, referencing the visual language of the film. The beginning of the video references to the Middle Passage, with appearances of Fulani hats, La Sape, Pantsula, Kufi caps, traditional African masks, and Kandake at the end. The video also features a sequence where Lamar walks alongside several panthers referencing the Black Panther soundtrack album.

=== Copyright infringement ===
In February 2018, British-Liberian artist Lina Iris Viktor claimed that images of her 24-karat gold patterned artwork were used in the music video without her permission. A settlement agreement was reached in principle on December 20.

== Live performances ==
Lamar and SZA performed "All the Stars" during their co-headlining Grand National Tour (2025). Concerts were divided into nine acts; they performed the song during the fifth. Standing on opposite ends of the runway, they sung their parts as the platforms below the two took them higher into the air.

== Awards and nominations ==
Year	Organization	Award	Result
2018	Teen Choice Awards	Choice R&B/Hip-Hop Song	Nominated
2018	MTV Video Music Awards	Best Visual Effects	Won
2018	iHeartRadio MMVAs	Best Collaboration	Nominated
2018	BreakTudo Awards	Best Collaboration	Nominated
2018	UK Music Video Awards	Best Urban Video: International	Nominated
2018	Hollywood Music in Media Awards	Best Original Song: Sci-Fi/Fantasy/Horror Film	Won
2019	Houston Film Critics Society	Best Original Song	Nominated
2019	Golden Globe Awards	Best Original Song	Nominated
2019	Georgia Film Critics Association	Best Original Song	Nominated
2019	Critics' Choice Awards	Best Song	Nominated
2019	African-American Film Critics Association	Best Song	Won
2019	Black Reel Awards	Outstanding Original Song	Won
2019	Grammy Awards	Record of the Year	Nominated
2019	Grammy Awards	Song of the Year	Nominated
2019	Grammy Awards	Best Rap/Sung Performance	Nominated
2019	Grammy Awards	Best Song Written for Visual Media	Nominated
2019	Academy Awards	Best Original Song	Nominated
2019	Satellite Awards	Best Original Song	Nominated
2019	Guild of Music Supervisors Awards	Best Song/Recording Created for a Film	Nominated
2019	NAACP Image Award	Outstanding Duo, Group or Collaboration	Won
2019	NAACP Image Award	Outstanding Music Video/Visual Album	Nominated
2019	PLAY – Portuguese Music Awards	Best International Song	Won

== Personnel ==
Credits adapted from digital booklet.

Performers

- Kendrick Lamar – vocals
- SZA – vocals

Technical

- Matt Schaeffer – record engineering, mix engineering
- Mike Bozzi – master engineering
- Sam Ricci – record engineering
- James Hunt – record engineering
- Lorenzo Richards - record engineering

Production

- Ezinma – string arrangement
- Sounwave – production
- Al Shux – production

== Charts ==
=== Weekly charts ===
Weekly chart performance for "All the Stars"
Chart (2018–2025)	Peak position
Australia (ARIA)	2
Austria (Ö3 Austria Top 40)	13
Belgium (Ultratop 50 Flanders)	21
Belgium (Ultratip Bubbling Under Wallonia)	11
Canada Hot 100 (Billboard)	7
Canada CHR/Top 40 (Billboard)	17
Czech Republic Airplay (ČNS IFPI)	12
Czech Republic Singles Digital (ČNS IFPI)	9
Denmark (Tracklisten)	7
Finland (Suomen virallinen lista)	31
France (SNEP)	24
Germany (GfK)	13
Global 200 (Billboard)	6
Hungary (Single Top 40)	33
Hungary (Stream Top 40)	6
Iceland (Tónlistinn)	14
Ireland (IRMA)	3
Israel (Mako Hitlist)	47
Italy (FIMI)	34
Latvia Streaming (LaIPA)	6
Lithuania (AGATA)	4
Luxembourg (Billboard)	6
Malaysia (RIM)	1
Mexico Inglés (Billboard)	1
Netherlands (Dutch Top 40)	29
Netherlands (Single Top 100)	11
New Zealand (Recorded Music NZ)	2
Norway (VG-lista)	6
Philippines (IFPI)	16
Philippines (Philippines Hot 100)	13
Poland (Polish Streaming Top 100)	17
Portugal (AFP)	2
Scottish Singles Sales (Official Charts)	18
Singapore (RIAS)	1
Slovakia Singles Digital (ČNS IFPI)	7
Slovenia (SloTop50)	47
Spain (PROMUSICAE)	59
Sweden (Sverigetopplistan)	7
Switzerland (Schweizer Hitparade)	9
UK Singles (Official Charts)	5
UK Hip Hop/R&B (Official Charts)	2
US Billboard Hot 100	7
US Hot R&B/Hip-Hop Songs (Billboard)	5
US Pop Airplay (Billboard)	15
US R&B/Hip-Hop Airplay (Billboard)	13
US Rhythmic Airplay (Billboard)	3

=== Year-end charts ===
2018 year-end chart performance for "All the Stars"
Chart (2018)	Position
Australia (ARIA)	17
Belgium (Ultratop Flanders)	92
Canada (Canadian Hot 100)	40
Denmark (Tracklisten)	55
Estonia (IFPI)	24
France (SNEP)	89
Ireland (IRMA)	25
New Zealand (Recorded Music NZ)	16
Portugal (AFP)	23
Sweden (Sverigetopplistan)	52
UK Singles (Official Charts Company)	38
US Billboard Hot 100	47
US Hot R&B/Hip-Hop Songs (Billboard)	25
US Rhythmic (Billboard)	17

2024 year-end chart performance for "All the Stars"
Chart (2024)	Position
Australia (ARIA)	74

2025 year-end chart performance for "All the Stars"
Chart (2025)	Position
Australia (ARIA)	45
Belgium (Ultratop 50 Flanders)	143
Global 200 (Billboard)	41
Iceland (Tónlistinn)	34
Philippines (Philippines Hot 100)	100
Sweden (Sverigetopplistan)	54
UK Singles (OCC)	60
US Hot R&B/Hip-Hop Songs (Billboard)	52

== Certifications ==
Certifications for "All the Stars"
Region	Certification	Certified units/sales
Australia (ARIA)	13× Platinum	910,000^{‡}
Austria (IFPI Austria)	Platinum	30,000^{‡}
Belgium (BRMA)	Gold	10,000^{‡}
Brazil (Pro-Música Brasil)	Diamond	160,000^{‡}
Canada (Music Canada)	6× Platinum	480,000^{‡}
Denmark (IFPI Danmark)	3× Platinum	270,000^{‡}
France (SNEP)	Diamond	333,333^{‡}
Germany (BVMI)	Platinum	600,000^{‡}
Italy (FIMI)	Platinum	50,000^{‡}
New Zealand (RMNZ)	9× Platinum	270,000^{‡}
Poland (ZPAV)	Platinum	50,000^{‡}
Portugal (AFP)	4× Platinum	40,000^{‡}
Spain (Promusicae)	Platinum	60,000^{‡}
United Kingdom (BPI)	4× Platinum	2,400,000^{‡}
United States (RIAA)	2× Platinum	2,000,000^{‡}
Streaming
Greece (IFPI Greece)	3× Platinum	6,000,000^{†}
Sweden (GLF)	Platinum	8,000,000^{†}
^{‡} Sales+streaming figures based on certification alone.^{†} Streaming-only figures based on certification alone.

== Release history ==
Release dates for "All the Stars"
Region	Date	Format	Label	Ref.
United States	January 4, 2018	Digital download; streaming	Top Dawg; Aftermath; Interscope	
United States	January 9, 2018	Rhythmic contemporary radio	Top Dawg; Aftermath; Interscope	
United States	January 9, 2018	Urban contemporary radio	Top Dawg; Aftermath; Interscope	
Italy	January 19, 2018	Contemporary hit radio	Universal	
United States	February 27, 2018	Contemporary hit radio	Top Dawg; Aftermath; Interscope	

== See also ==
- List of highest-certified singles in Australia
- List of number-one songs of 2018 (Malaysia)
- List of number-one songs of 2018 (Singapore)
- Billboard Year-End Hot 100 singles of 2018
