= Kiss and Make Up (Dua Lipa and Blackpink song) =

2018 song by Dua Lipa and Blackpink

Promotional single by Dua Lipa and Blackpink

from the album Dua Lipa: Complete Edition
- Language: English; Korean
- Released: 19 October 2018
- Studio: TaP (London); Rollover (UK)
- Genre: Dance; electropop; reggaeton
- Length: 3:09
- Label: Warner Bros.
- Songwriters: Dua Lipa; Chelcee Grimes; Yannick Rastogi; Zacharie Raymond; Mathieu Jomphe-Lepine; Marc Vincent; Teddy Park
- Producer: Banx & Ranx

Audio video
- "Kiss and Make Up" on YouTube

"Kiss and Make Up" is a song by English singer Dua Lipa and South Korean girl group Blackpink from Dua Lipa: Complete Edition (2018), the super deluxe reissue of the former's eponymous debut studio album. The song was written by Lipa, Chelcee Grimes, Yannick Rastogi, Zacharie Raymond, Mathieu Jomphe-Lepine, Marc Vincent, and Teddy Park, while production was handled by Banx & Ranx. It was released through Warner Bros. Records as the final promotional single from all editions of the album on 19 October 2018, alongside the reissue's release.

The song was commercially successful, charting within the top 40 of nineteen countries, and topped the charts in Malaysia and Singapore. Additionally, it reached number 36 on the UK Singles Chart and number 75 on South Korea's Gaon Digital Chart. The song has since been certified platinum in Australia and New Zealand, gold in Italy and Portugal, and silver in the United Kingdom. "Kiss and Make Up" was included on the set list of Blackpink's In Your Area World Tour (2018–2020). A pop-funk remix of the song appears on Lipa and the Blessed Madonna's remix album Club Future Nostalgia (2020), that contains elements of Herb Alpert's "Rise" (1979).

== Writing and production ==
"Kiss and Make Up" was written by Dua Lipa, Chelcee Grimes, Mathieu Jomphe-Lepine, Marc Vincent, Teddy Park, Yannick Rastogi and Zacharie Raymond, with production from the latter two as Banx & Ranx. It was originally written about a year and a half before it was released, as a solo song for Lipa; the song did not fit her album at the time, and she wanted it be a collaboration so she ultimately left it off the track list for her eponymous debut studio album (2017). After the album's release, Grimes pitched the song to other singers including Demi Lovato, Britney Spears, and Miley Cyrus, but all turned it down thinking the lyrics were too immature.

On 6 May 2018, Lipa performed a concert in Seoul as part of her Self-Titled Tour, where Blackpink's Jennie and Lisa were in attendance. Lipa recalled having an "absolute blast" with them. Lipa thought "Kiss and Make Up" would sound great as a collaboration with Blackpink. Lipa then sent Blackpink the song asking to feature on it, which they accepted. Blackpink went into the studio and translated the lyrics into Korean. The song was recorded at Rollover Studio in the United Kingdom and the vocals were recorded at TaP Studio in London. Mixing was handled by Jamie Snell at The Hamilton in Cheam, while mastering was done by Chris Gehringer at Sterling Sound in New York City.

Following the release of her second studio album, Future Nostalgia in March 2020, Lipa intended to create a mixtape with remixes of songs from the record. She enlisted the help of The Blessed Madonna to create what would eventually become the remix album, Club Future Nostalgia (2020). Lipa wanted to somehow include some of her past collaborations and The Blessed Madonna wanted to introduce a younger crowd to the music of American trumpeter Herb Alpert, by creating an extended version of one of his songs. She took the vocals of "Kiss and Make Up" and parts of Alpert's "Rise" (1979) to create a remix. The Blessed Madonna thought that the two songs were "totally in key" and "a perfect fit." Andy Armer and Randy Alpert are credited on the remix due to elements of "Rise" being used.

== Music and lyrics ==
"Kiss and Make Up"
A dance, electropop and reggaeton song, "Kiss and Make Up" makes use of vocoders and bass synths in the production. The lyrics see the two artists singing about using physical affection to solve issues between two lovers.

Musically, "Kiss and Make Up" is a rhythmic dance, electropop and reggaeton song, with tropical and EDM elements. It is composed in the time signature of 4/4 time in the key of E♭ major, with a tempo of 100 beats per minute and a chord progression of Cm–A♭–E♭–B♭/Gm. The song has a length of three minutes and nine seconds, and features a clubby and incandescent production, consisting of bass synths, a clattering percussion, and a bouncing backbeat. The structure includes a vocodered intro, an early-2010s hook and a rhythmic chorus.

Lipa begins the song, before Jennie raps in the second verse, while Rosé handles the pre-chorus. Lipa and Blackpink's vocals range from G_{3} to C_{5}, singing flirty and assertive lyrics in both English and Korean. Lyrically, the track creates a storyline about using physical affection instead of words to solve issues between two lovers. Musically, the Club Future Nostalgia remix of "Kiss and Make Up" is a "rubbery" pop-funk track that pays homage to the urban roots of remix culture, that uses elements of "Rise" by Herb Alpert, including its bass. It was compared to Madonna's 1989 song "Express Yourself".

== Release and promotion ==
"Kiss and Make Up" was first teased in the music video for Lipa's 2016 single "Blow Your Mind (Mwah)", where its title appeared on a sign one of Lipa's friends holds in a pride parade. Lipa announced the song's release on 4 September 2018. It was released for digital download and streaming on 19 October 2018 as the second promotional single from the reissue of Lipa's debut album Dua Lipa: Complete Edition. The same day, it was released as the third track on the second disc of the reissue. The song was included on the setlist of Blackpink's In Your Area World Tour as the eleventh song performed. In Lipa's absence, Rosé and Jisoo sang her parts. At the Prudential Center show on 1 May 2019 in Newark, New Jersey, Lipa joined Blackpink to perform the song. The remix of the song is included on Lipa and The Blessed Madonna's Club Future Nostalgia remix album as the fifteenth track, released on 28 August 2020. It was accompanied by an animated visualizer that features a livestream of a mushroom man dancing on a chair.

== Critical reception ==
Mike Nied of Idolator praised Blackpink's "commendable performance" and the song's "fierce lines." For Billboard, Jeff Benjamin labelled it an "excellently crafted electro-pop throbber," while Uproxx's Chloe Gilke called it "anthemic pop perfection." In NME Rhian Daly named it Blackpink's eighth best song, complimenting the mix of "East meets West," that "elevates the song beyond the typical." He concluded by praising Lipa and Blackpink's chemistry, stating the latter's voices "[bounce] smoothly" off the former's. Writing for Paper, Emlyn Travis complimented how the English and Korean languages "weave together" and declared it "fits seamlessly" within both artist's discographies. She concluded by calling it "undeniably addictive." In O, The Oprah Magazine, Monica Chon praised how the two artist's English and Korean vocals work together "seamlessly," while also opining that it makes a "strong case that language barriers should not be an impediment to enjoying pop music."

== Accolades ==
Awards and nominations for "Kiss and Make Up"
Year	Organization	Award	Result	Ref.
2019	BreakTudo Awards	Collaboration of the Year	Won	

== Commercial performance ==
"Kiss and Make Up" debuted and peaked at number 36 on the UK Singles Chart issue dated 26 October 2018, and spent a total of 12 weeks on the chart. This made Blackpink the first K-pop girl group to reach the top 40 on the chart. The track reached 20.4 million streams in the UK as of April 2019, and 38.6 million streams as of September 2022, becoming the group's fourth most-streamed song in the country. In December 2025, the song was awarded a gold certification in the country by the British Phonographic Industry (BPI) for track-equivalent sales of 400,000 units. It spent two weeks on the ARIA Singles Chart, where it peaked at number 33 in its first week. The song currently holds a platinum certification in Australia by the Australian Recording Industry Association (ARIA) for selling 70,000 track-equivalent units. In Asia, the song reached number 90 on the Japan Hot 100, and entered South Korea's Gaon Digital Chart, peaking at number 75.

"Kiss and Make Up" spent one week on the US Billboard Hot 100 at number 93, becoming Blackpink's second and Lipa's seventh entry on the chart, with first-week sales of 11,000 downloads and seven million on-demand streams. The song additionally entered the top 40 of charts in Austria, Czech Republic, Estonia, Finland, Greece, Hungary, Ireland, New Zealand, Poland, Portugal, Romania, Scotland, Slovakia, Sweden, and Switzerland, as well as Malaysia and Singapore, where it reached the summit. It was also awarded respective gold certifications in Italy and Portugal by the Federazione Industria Musicale Italiana (FIMI) and Associação Fonográfica Portuguesa (AFP), for respective track-equivalent sales of 25,000 and 5,000 units.

== Track listings ==
- Digital download and streaming
1. "Kiss and Make Up" – 3:09
- Digital download and streaming – the Blessed Madonna's remix
1. "Kiss and Make Up" – 2:21

== Personnel ==
- Dua Lipa – vocals
- Blackpink – vocals
  - Jennie Kim – vocals
  - Jisoo Kim – vocals
  - Lalisa Manoban – vocals
  - Roseanne Park – vocals
- Chelcee Grimes – backing vocals
- Banx & Ranx – production
  - Yannick Rastogi – drums, bass, synths, keys, programming
  - Zacharie Raymond – drums, bass, synths, keys, programming
- Yong In Choi – engineering
- Jamie Snell – mixing
- Chris Gehringer – mastering

== Charts ==
=== Weekly charts ===
Weekly chart performance
Chart (2018–2019)	Peak position
Australia (ARIA)	33
Austria (Ö3 Austria Top 40)	34
Belarus Airplay (Eurofest)	26
Belgium (Ultratip Bubbling Under Flanders)	4
Belgium (Ultratip Bubbling Under Wallonia)	16
Canada Hot 100 (Billboard)	44
CIS Airplay (TopHit)	19
Croatia International Airplay (Top lista)	90
Czech Republic Singles Digital (ČNS IFPI)	27
Estonia (Eesti Tipp-40)	15
Finland (Suomen virallinen lista)	15
Germany (GfK)	48
Germany Airplay (BVMI)	36
Greece International (IFPI)	6
Hungary (Single Top 40)	26
Hungary (Stream Top 40)	9
Ireland (IRMA)	15
Italy (FIMI)	91
Japan Hot 100 (Billboard)	90
Lithuania (AGATA)	11
Malaysia (RIM)	1
Netherlands (Single Top 100)	48
Netherlands (Global Top 40)	14
New Zealand (Recorded Music NZ)	32
Poland Airplay (ZPAV)	10
Portugal (AFP)	29
Romania (Airplay 100)	22
Romania Airplay (TopHit)	193
Russia Airplay (TopHit)	25
Scottish Singles Sales (Official Charts)	30
Singapore (RIAS)	1
Slovakia Airplay (ČNS IFPI)	33
Slovakia Singles Digital (ČNS IFPI)	20
South Korea (Gaon)	75
Spain (Promusicae)	68
Spain Airplay (PROMUSICAE)	5
Sweden (Sverigetopplistan)	32
Switzerland (Schweizer Hitparade)	45
Ukraine Airplay (TopHit)	67
UK Singles (Official Charts)	36
US Billboard Hot 100	93
Venezuela Anglo (Record Report)	55

=== Monthly charts ===
Monthly chart performance
Chart (2018)	Peak position
CIS Airplay (TopHit)	28
Russia Airplay (TopHit)	34

=== Year-end charts ===
Year-end chart performance
Chart (2019)	Position
CIS Airplay (TopHit)	80
Poland (ZPAV)	80
Romania (Airplay 100)	55
Russia Airplay (TopHit)	103

== Certifications ==
Certifications
Region	Certification	Certified units/sales
Australia (ARIA)	Platinum	70,000^{‡}
Austria (IFPI Austria)	Gold	15,000^{‡}
Canada (Music Canada)	Platinum	80,000^{‡}
Italy (FIMI)	Gold	25,000^{‡}
New Zealand (RMNZ)	Platinum	30,000^{‡}
Poland (ZPAV)	Platinum	50,000^{‡}
Portugal (AFP)	Platinum	10,000^{‡}
Spain (Promusicae)	Platinum	60,000^{‡}
United Kingdom (BPI)	Gold	400,000^{‡}
^{‡} Sales+streaming figures based on certification alone.

== Release history ==
Release dates and formats
Region	Date	Format(s)	Label	Ref.
Various	19 October 2018	Digital download; streaming	Warner Bros.	

== See also ==
- List of best-selling girl group singles
- List of K-pop songs on the Billboard charts
- List of number-one songs of 2018 (Malaysia)
- List of number-one songs of 2018 (Singapore)
