= Idol (BTS song) =

2018 single by BTS

Single by BTS

from the album Love Yourself: Answer
- A-side: "Lights" / "Boy with Luv" (Japanese version)
- Released: August 24, 2018
- Studio: Dogg Bounce; The Rock Pitt
- Genre: Gqom; EDM; samul nori; trap
- Length: 3:43 (original); 4:20 (remix)
- Label: Big Hit
- Songwriters: Bang Si-hyuk; Roman Campolo; Kang Hyo-won; Kim Nam-joon; Shin Dong-hyuk; Ali Tamposi; Onika Maraj
- Producer: Pdogg

BTS singles chronology
| "Fake Love" (2018) | "Idol" (2018) | "Waste It on Me" (2018) |

Nicki Minaj singles chronology
| "Goodbye" (2018) | "Idol" (2018) | "Woman Like Me" (2018) |

Music video
- "Idol" on YouTube "Idol (feat. Nicki Minaj)" on YouTube

Audio sample
- A 22-second sample from "Idol": file; help

"Idol" (stylized in all caps) is a song recorded by South Korean boy band BTS. It was released on August 24, 2018, by Big Hit Entertainment as the lead single from the band's third compilation album Love Yourself: Answer (2018). An alternative version of the song featuring Nicki Minaj was included as a bonus track on the digital version of the album. The single debuted at number 11 on the Billboard Hot 100, and the two versions combined sold 43,000 downloads in their first week of sale in the US. It is certified platinum by the RIAA.

On July 3, 2019, the Japanese version of the song was released as a B-side track, along with the Japanese version of "Boy with Luv" and an original Japanese track titled "Lights".

== Background and release ==
The day before the release of the single when its trailer was released, rumors about a collaboration track between BTS and Nicki Minaj had surfaced when Shazam identified the teaser video of the track as "Idol by BTS (feat. Nicki Minaj)". On August 24, 2018, two hours before the official release of the album, Big Hit Entertainment confirmed that an alternative version of "Idol" featuring Nicki Minaj would be included in the digital version of the album as a bonus track.

After its release, the song inspired an Internet dance challenge known as the "Idol Challenge", in which people dance to the chorus of the song, to try out the song's choreography. Several celebrities joined the challenge, including B.A.P member Zelo and Stephen "tWitch" Boss of The Ellen DeGeneres Show.

== Composition ==
As described by Billboard's Tamar Herman, "Idol" is a "traditionally inspired track" featuring different classical Korean instruments. According to media outlets, the song and the music video were inspired by Korean genre pansori and John Woo's 1997 movie Face/Off. Yonhap reported, "The song is electronic dance music in the style of South African dance music. The African beats are layered with traditional Korean rhythms, as well as the pounding of a Korean folk percussion instrument used in the performance of traditional Korean farmers' ensemble. Rolling Stone India said, "According to the group's label Big Hit Entertainment, "Idol" was inspired by gqom, a style of house music that originated in Durban, South Africa. Gqom combines powerful traditional thumping drum with bass and house synths in a balance between tradition and trend." adding, "The track's blend of Korean instruments like the gakgung (the Korean horn-bow which explains the shehnai-like sounds) with African rhythms, trap rap and electronica contribute to expanding its culturally rich, diverse, global sound".

"Idol" is in the key of C♯ minor and incorporates various styles such as pop, world, contemporary R&B, and K-pop. Both versions are 126 beats per minute. One of the writers, Ali Tamposi, stated the rep from Big Hit wanted the song to feel intense.

In 2020, the lyrics of "Idol" were displayed in a special exhibition titled "Korean Pop Lyrics: Melodies of Life" at the National Hangeul Museum in Seoul.

== Music video ==
The music video for "Idol" was preceded by a teaser clip released two days prior, with the full video premiering on YouTube on August 24, 2018. It became the most watched music video within the first 24 hours on the platform, garnering 45.9 million views within that time and surpassing Taylor Swift's "Look What You Made Me Do", which recorded 43.2 million views in 2017. It also became the most viewed music video by a K-pop group in the first 24 hours, breaking the record previously held by Blackpink's "Ddu-Du Ddu-Du", which earned 32.6 million views in its first 24 hours. "Idol" surpassed 100 million views on August 29 and became the fastest music video in YouTube history to reach the milestone—Ariana Grande's "Thank U, Next" broke the record the following December when it reached the mark four days after release. In September 2022, the music video became BTS' sixth to surpass 1 billion views.

A music video for the remix of the single featuring Nicki Minaj was released on September 6, 2018. Mostly identical to the original music video, it includes additional scenes of Minaj rapping her part while a Korean transliteration of the lyrics appears onscreen behind her. The video ends with various clips of the band's fans dancing the song's choreography as part of the "Idol Challenge".

== Critical reception ==
Raisa Bruner of Time described the song as "a clubby, beat-heavy track that pulses with energy and a sax melody line off the top", with the song being "hard-charging" during its runtime. Regarding the collaboration with Minaj, Bruner thought that the "collaboration mark[s] the beginning of BTS’ impending arrival on the U.S. scene."

== Commercial performance ==
In the United States, "Idol" debuted at number 11 on the Billboard Hot 100 and was ranked first in sales for the week, the two versions combined selling 43,000 downloads in their first week of sales, and generated 24.4 million first-week streams combined. The song dropped 70 positions in its second week, charting at number 81. It was certified platinum by the Recording Industry Association of America (RIAA) in January 2020.

== Accolades ==
Year-end lists
| Critic/Publication | List | Rank | Ref. |
|---|---|---|---|
| Elite Daily | The 12 Best New Songs Of 2018 | 7 | |
| Entertainment Tonight | Best Music Videos of 2018 | Placed | |
| Gallup Korea | The Best Songs in 2018 | 2 | |
| Philippine Daily Inquirer | Most Covered K-pop Songs of 2018 | 2 | |
| SBS PopAsia | Top 100 Asian pop songs of 2018 | 1 | |
| YouTube Rewind | Top 10 Most Popular Music Videos In Korea From 2018 | 9 | |

Awards
| Year | Organization | Award | Result | Ref. |
|---|---|---|---|---|
| 2018 | E! People's Choice Awards | Song of the Year | Won | |
| 2018 | E! People's Choice Awards | Music Video of the Year | Won | |
| 2018 | Korea Popular Music Awards (Note: The Korea Popular Music Awards were jointly established in 2018 by the Korea Singers Association, the Korea Entertainment Producer's Association, the Recording Industry Association of Korea, the Federation of Korean Music Performers, and the Korea Music Copyright Association.) | Best Digital Song | Nominated | |
| 2018 | Mnet Asian Music Awards | TikTok Best Music Video | Won | |
| 2018 | Mnet Asian Music Awards | Favorite Music Video | Won | |
| 2018 | MBC Plus X Genie Music Awards | Best Dance Track – Male | Won | |
| 2018 | MBC Plus X Genie Music Awards | Song of the Year | Nominated | |
| 2018 | MBC Plus X Genie Music Awards | Best Music Video | Won | |
| 2019 | Gaon Chart Music Awards | Song of the Year – August | Nominated | |
| 2019 | Korean Music Awards | Song of the Year | Nominated | |
| 2019 | Korean Music Awards | Best Pop Song | Nominated | |

Music program awards
| Program | Date (8 total) | Ref. |
|---|---|---|
| Music Bank | August 31, 2018 | |
| Music Bank | September 7, 2018 | |
| Music Bank | September 14, 2018 | |
| Inkigayo | September 2, 2018 | |
| Inkigayo | September 9, 2018 | |
| Inkigayo | September 16, 2018 | |
| Show Champion | September 5, 2018 | |
| Show Champion | September 12, 2018 | |

Melon Popularity Award
| Award | Date (2018) | Ref. |
|---|---|---|
| Weekly Popularity Award | September 3 | |
| Weekly Popularity Award | September 10 | |
| Weekly Popularity Award | September 17 | |
| Weekly Popularity Award | September 24 | |
| Weekly Popularity Award | October 1 | |

== Promotion ==
BTS promoted the song on various music programs in South Korea including M Countdown, Music Bank, Show! Music Core, and Inkigayo, garnering eight wins despite its short promotional period. They also performed it at several domestic year-end festivals and award shows, including the Melon Music Awards, SBS Gayo Daejeon, the MBC Plus X Genie Music Awards, MBC Gayo Daejejeon, and the 28th Seoul Music Awards held in January 2019.

The band also promoted the single internationally. They performed it on the Season 13 semi-final of America's Got Talent which aired on September 12, 2018, followed by performances on The Tonight Show Starring Jimmy Fallon and Good Morning America. During the European leg of their Love Yourself World Tour, the group guested on the October 12 episode of The Graham Norton Show and performed the song. In January 2019, Mattel announced a collaboration with BTS that included the creation of a line of dolls modeled after the band's outfits from the "Idol" music video. The dolls were released in September.

== Track listing ==
| No. | Title | Writer(s) | Producer(s) | Length |
|---|---|---|---|---|
| 1. | "Idol" | "Hitman" Bang; Ali Tamposi; RM; Roman Campolo; Supreme Boi | Pdogg | 3:43 |

Digital bonus track
| No. | Title | Writer(s) | Producer(s) | Length |
|---|---|---|---|---|
| 1. | "Idol" (featuring Nicki Minaj) | "Hitman" bang; Ali Tamposi; Onika Maraj; Pdogg; RM; Roman Campolo; Supreme Boi | Pdogg | 4:20 |

== Credits and personnel ==
=== Korean version ===
Adapted from the liner notes of Love Yourself: Answer.

- Pdogg – producer, keyboard, synthesizer, vocal & rap arrangement, digital editing, recording engineer @ Dogg Bounce
- Supreme Boi – producer, chorus, gang vocal, vocal & rap arrangement, digital editing, recording engineer @ The Rock Pitt
- "Hitman" Bang – producer
- Ali Tamposi – producer
- Roman Campolo – producer
- RM – producer, gang vocal
- Jungkook – chorus, gang vocal
- J-Hope – gang vocal
- ADORA – digital editing
- Hiss noise – digital editing
- James F. Reynolds – mix engineer

== Usage in media ==
"Idol" is featured in the heavily panned YouTube Rewind 2018: Everyone Controls Rewind.

"Idol" was the goal song for South Korea during the 2022 FIFA World Cup.

== Charts ==
=== Weekly charts ===
Original version
| Chart (2018) | Peak position |
|---|---|
| Australia (ARIA) | 35 |
| Estonia (Eesti Tipp-40) | 38 |
| Hungary (Single Top 40) | 2 |
| Hungary (Stream Top 40) | 20 |
| Ireland (IRMA) | 33 |
| Japan Hot 100 (Billboard Japan) | 11 |
| Malaysia (RIM) | 1 |
| New Zealand Hot Singles (RMNZ) | 2 |
| Scotland Singles (Official Charts) | 10 |
| Singapore (RIAS) | 1 |
| Slovakia Singles Digital (ČNS IFPI) | 61 |
| South Africa (EMA) | 5 |
| South Korea (Gaon) | 1 |
| South Korea (Kpop Hot 100) | 1 |
| Spain (PROMUSICAE) | 71 |
| Sweden (Sverigetopplistan) | 60 |
| UK Independent Singles | 3 |
| UK Singles (Official Charts) | 21 |

Version featuring Nicki Minaj
| Chart (2018) | Peak position |
|---|---|
| Argentina (Argentina Hot 100) | 48 |
| Argentina Anglo (Monitor Latino) | 14 |
| Austria (Ö3 Austria Top 40) | 26 |
| Belgium (Ultratip Bubbling Under Flanders) | 26 |
| Canada (Canadian Hot 100) | 5 |
| Euro Digital Song Sales (Billboard) | 8 |
| France (SNEP) | 103 |
| Finland Digital Song Sales (Billboard) | 1 |
| Germany (GfK) | 43 |
| Greece Digital Songs (Billboard) | 1 |
| Italy (FIMI) | 88 |
| Japan Hot 100 (Billboard Japan) | 47 |
| Mexico Ingles Airplay (Billboard) | 24 |
| Netherlands (Single Top 100) | 96 |
| Portugal (AFP) | 47 |
| South Korea (Gaon) | 86 |
| South Korea (Kpop Hot 100) | 10 |
| Sweden Digital Songs (Billboard) | 1 |
| Switzerland (Schweizer Hitparade) | 45 |
| US Billboard Hot 100 | 11 |
| US World Digital Song Sales (Billboard) | 1 |

=== Year-end charts ===
| Chart (2018) | Position |
|---|---|
| South Korea (Gaon) | 70 |
| Chart (2019) | Position |
| Japan (Japan Hot 100) | 92 |
| South Korea (Gaon) | 49 |
| Chart (2020) | Position |
| South Korea (Gaon) | 164 |

== Certifications ==
| Region | Certification | Certified units/sales |
|---|---|---|
| Australia (ARIA) | Gold | 35,000^{‡} |
| Canada (Music Canada) | 2× Platinum | 160,000^{‡} |
| New Zealand (RMNZ) | Gold | 15,000^{‡} |
| South Korea (KMCA) | Platinum | 2,500,000^{*} |
| United Kingdom (BPI) | Silver | 200,000^{‡} |
| United States (RIAA) | Platinum | 1,000,000^{‡} |
Streaming
| Japan (RIAJ) | Platinum | 100,000,000^{†} |
| South Korea (KMCA) | Platinum | 100,000,000^{†} |
^{*} Sales figures based on certification alone.^{‡} Sales+streaming figures based on certification alone.^{†} Streaming-only figures based on certification alone.

== Release history ==
| Region | Date | Format | Version | Label | Ref. |
|---|---|---|---|---|---|
| Various | August 24, 2018 | Digital download; streaming | Original | Big Hit | |
| United Kingdom | October 12, 2018 | Contemporary hit radio | Nicki Minaj Remix | Big Hit; RED Music | |

== See also ==
- List of number-one songs of 2018 (Malaysia)
- List of number-one songs of 2018 (Singapore)
