= AAA (Hyukoh and Sunset Rollercoaster album) =

Studio album by Hyukoh and Sunset Rollercoaster
- Released: July 10, 2024
- Recorded: 2023–2024
- Studios: Gapyeong and Jeju Island, South Korea
- Genres: Indie rock, alternative rock, synth-pop, psychedelic rock
- Length: 39:26
- Labels: Dooroodooroo Artist Company and Sunset Music Productions
- Producers: Oh hyuk, Kuo-Hung Tseng, JNKYRD

Hyukoh and Sunset Rollercoaster chronology
AAA (2024)	AAA Live (2025)

AAA is a collaborative studio album by South Korean indie rock band Hyukoh and Taiwanese synth-pop band Sunset Rollercoaster. Released on July 10, 2024, the project was co-produced by Oh hyuk and Kuo-hung Tseng alongside hyukoh's frequent collaborator, producer, and electronic musician JNKYRD. Both Bands alongside JNKYRD formed a combined ten-piece live supergroup called "TEAM AAA" for an international concert tour which was later released as "AAA LIVE" album.

== Name and concept ==
According to the bands, the name "AAA" has multiple meanings. It was first selected by Sunset Rollercoaster members as a way to tribute their car insurance company when they were touring in the west in their early reformation days and because it represented high quality level. Later both the band settled on "AAA" as an abbreviation of "Access All Areas".

Kuo-Hung Tseng described the collab's concept as a "group of 10 aliens traveling around the world trying to make a living from music." According to Kuo, this unique approach allowed the musicians to step outside of their regular artistic personalities through avant-garde fashion and stage costumes.

== Background and recording ==
The collaboration between Hyukoh and Sunset Rollercoaster began in early 2020 when members of both bands met in Tokyo, Japan, leading to early guest appearances on each other's respective projects. Initially planned to record a collaborative project to be a brief extended play (EP), the recording process evolved into a full-length studio album.

The tracks were developed through long-form songwriting and improvisation camps held monthly throughout 2023 and 2024. These sessions took place in Gapyeong and on Jeju Island, South Korea. Co-producer JNKYRD described the recording process as "all in one room" with up to ten musicians physically writing and tracking instrumental loops simultaneously in a single studio space.

== Critical reception and awards ==
=== Critical response ===
AAA received positive reviews from music critics. A reviewer from The K-Meal described the collaboration as a "perfect blend" of the two groups, noting the refreshing tone of tracks like "Do Nothing" and the meditative quality of the ambient interlude "Aaaannnnteeeeennnaaaaaa". NME critics described the project as "a match made in indie heaven," praising the collab achieved between the two groups distinct musical styles. Critics from Eastern Standard Times characterized the collab as "the indie collaboration of the year," highlighting its "extensive and wild structural experimentation."

=== Awards and accolades ===
At the 36th Golden Melody Awards in 2025, AAA received seven nominations and won three awards. The album won Best Vocal Recording Album. Additionally, the track "Antenna" won Best Music Video for director Rafhoo, while Chanhee Hong and Na Kim won Best Album Design.

== Track listing ==
All tracks written, arranged, and performed by Hyukoh and Sunset Rollercoaster alongside JNKYRD. Credits adapted from the official liner notes published by the artists.

No.	Title	Recording details	Length
1.	"Kite War"	Instruments recorded by Sang-Hyun Cho, Hye-Seok Oh, Yuchain Wang, and YJ (Moollon); vocals recorded by Sang-Hyun Cho, Hye-Seok Oh, YJ (Moollon), and James Fouren at musicvillage1939, molstudios, and MoriSound Studio.	5:57
2.	"Y"	Instruments recorded by Sang-Hyun Cho, Hye-Seok Oh, and Yuchain Wang; vocals recorded by SangHyun Cho and HyeSeok Oh at musicvillage1939, molstudios, and MoriSound Studio.	5:43
3.	"Antenna"	Instruments recorded by Sang-Hyun Cho, Hye-Seok Oh, and James Fouren; vocals recorded by Sang-Hyun Cho and Hye-Seok Oh at musicvillage1939, molstudios, and MoriSound Studio.	3:25
4.	"Glue"	Instruments recorded by Sang-Hyun Cho, Hye-Seok Oh, and Yu-chain Wang; vocals recorded by Sang-Hyun Cho and Hye-Seok Oh at musicvillage1939, molstudios, and MoriSound Studio.	4:21
5.	"Young Man"	Instruments recorded by Sang-Hyun Cho, Hye-Seok Oh, and Yu-chain Wang; vocals recorded by Sang-Hyun Cho and Hye-Seok Oh at musicvillage1939, molstudios, and MoriSound Studio.	4:18
6.	"Do Nothing"	Instruments and vocals recorded by YJ (Moollon) and James Fouren at Moollon Studio.	3:47
7.	"Aaaannnnteeeeennnaaaaaa"	Instruments recorded by Sang-Hyun Cho, Hye-Seok Oh, and James Fouren; vocals recorded by Sang-Hyun Cho and Hye-Seok Oh at ManSangDanJung and molstudios.	6:51
8.	"2F 年轻人 (2F Young Man)"	Instruments and vocals recorded by Yuchain Wang at musicvillage1939. Mixed by Norman Nitzsche and James Fouren. Vocals performed by OHHYUK, KUO, HAOTING, ZL, and JNKYRD.	5:09
Total length:			39:26

== Charts ==
Chart peaks for AAA
Chart (2024)	Peak position
Korea Circle Album Chart	18

== Personnel ==
Credits adapted from the liner notes of AAA.

- Oh Hyuk – vocals, rhythm guitar, auxiliary percussion (bongos, congas)
- Im Dong-geon – lead electric guitar, acoustic guitar
- Lim Hyun-jae – bass guitar, guitar
- Lee In-woo – drums and percussions
- JNKYRD – programming, electronics, live sampling, auxiliary percussion, backing vocals
- Tseng Kuo-Hung – vocals, rhythm guitar, stage introductions
- Chen Hung-Li – bass guitar, synth-bass
- Wang Shao-Hsuan – keyboards, synthesizers
- Huang Hao-Ting – saxophones, keyboards, backing vocals
- Lo Tsun-Lung – drums

=== Technical production credits ===
- Mixing – Norman Nitzsche; MOKIK Studio (Berlin) & Studio REF
- Mixing assistance – James Fouren Studio REF
- Engineering – James Fouren Studio REF & Yuchain Wang MoriSound Studio
- Mastering – Norman Nitzsche MOKIK Studio (Berlin)
- Key visual – Chanhee Hong
- Artwork design – Na Kim
- Styling – Yeyoung Kim

== Aftermath ==
Team AAA 's final performance took place on August 3, 2025 at the Incheon Pentaporta Rock Festival. Later the same day the members posted a letter called "From AAA to AAA" reflecting on the two year long journey featuring short handwritten notes. The letter detailed individual member reflections alongside plans for a continuation of the collaboration:

- Oh Hyuk wrote a message looking forward to future plans ("See you next time").
- Im Dong-geon left a warm sign-off addressing each team members by name.
- Lim Hyun-jae stated that the project would not be a one-time occurrence ("AAA won't end immediately!").
- Lee In-woo expressed love for the all team members.
- Tseng Kuo-Hung wrote a message of gratitude ("Thank you, love you").
- JNKYRD thanked fans (LOVE YA! MY JINJIS!) and the team, playfully referencing chapter two "BBB?".
- Lo Tsun-Lung signed off with a thankful note hinting a return ("Ultra thank you!! We will be back!").
- Wang Shao-Hsuan expressed gratitude ("can't wait for chapter 2").
- Chen Hung Li drew an abstract face next to Tsun-Lung's letter.
- Huang Haoting signed a small phrase expressing joy (Fun! Fun!).

Following the conclusion of the project, both bands returned to their independent activities. Sunset Rollercoaster went on to release and promote their fifth studio album, Quit Quietly (2025). Whereas producer and electronic musician JNKYRD became an internal core member for Hyukoh, co-producing and arranging their 2026 singles, "Godspeed!", "KoK" and for their upcoming studio album.
