= Car, the Garden =

South Korean singer (born 1990)

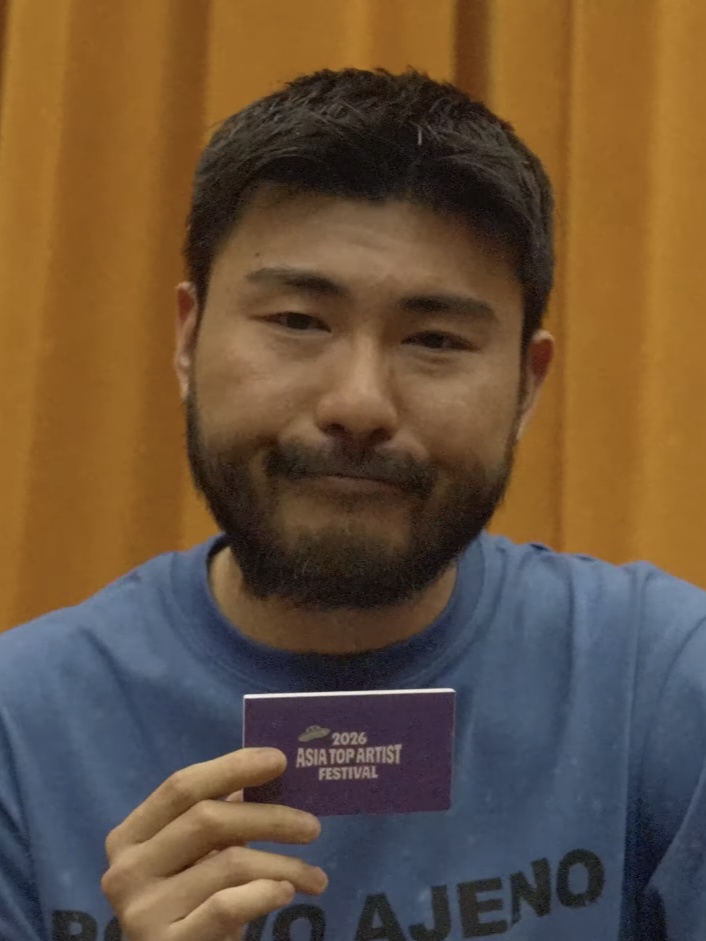
- Car, the Garden in 2026

Background information
- Also known as: Mayson the Soul
- Born: Cha Jung-won; October 23, 1990 (age 36); South Korea
- Genres: R&B; hip hop; indie rock; Pop rock
- Occupations: Singer; songwriter
- Instrument: Vocals
- Years active: 2010–present
- Label: DRDR AC

Korean name
- Hangul: 차정원
- RR: Cha Jeongwon
- MR: Ch'a Chŏngwŏn

Cha Jung-won (Korean: 차정원; born October 23, 1990), known professionally as Car, the Garden (카더가든) and formerly Mayson the Soul (메이슨 더 소울), is a South Korean indie rock musician. He released his first EP, Jackasoul, on September 30, 2013.

The name Car, the Garden was suggested by his friend, Oh Hyuk of Hyukoh. It is a literal translation of his birth name; his last name Cha (차) is a homonym of "car", while his first name Jung-won (정원) means "garden".

== Discography ==
=== Studio albums ===
Title	Album details	Peak chart positions	Sales
Title	Album details	KOR	Sales
Photographer	Released: March 24, 2015; Label: Finest Records; Formats: CD, digital download, streaming	86	—N/a
Apartment	Released: December 12, 2017; Label: DRDR AC; Formats: CD, digital download, streaming	41	KOR: 799
C	Released: October 23, 2019; Label: DRDR AC; Formats: CD, digital download, streaming	53	—N/a
Harmony	Released: September 12, 2023; Label: DRDR AC; Formats: LP, CD, digital download, streaming	46	KOR: 2,772

=== Extended plays ===
Title	Album details	Peak chart positions	Sales
Title	Album details	KOR	Sales
Jackasoul	Released: September 30, 2013; Label: Finest Records; Formats: CD, digital download, streaming	58	—
Absence (부재)	Released: January 28, 2021; Label: DRDR AC; Formats: CD, digital download, streaming	86	—
Diamond	Released: November 10, 2022; Label: DRDR AC; Formats: Digital download, streaming	—	—
Two (with O3ohn)	Released: June 15, 2025; Label: CAM; Formats: Digital download, streaming	—	—
Blue Heart	Released: December 16, 2025; Label: CAM; Formats: Digital download, streaming	72	KOR: 859

== Musical Influences ==
Jung-won has expressed influence from Alex Turner of Arctic Monkeys as his role model alongside The Black Skirts, Crying Nut, Oh Hyuk, Kim Haewon as a major influences while noting that his music spans around synth-pop, urban pop rock, ballad, Britpop. Jung-won shared that during his high school, he started listening to acts like Oasis and Radiohead which sparked his interest in music, with acts like beenzino for early days as Mayson, the soul.

== Singles ==
Title	Year	Peak chart positions	Sales (DL)	Album
Title	Year	KOR	Sales (DL)	Album
"Bus Stop"	2013	—	—N/a	Jackasoul
"Holiday" (홀리데이) (featuring Beenzino)	2013	—	—N/a	Jackasoul
"Talk"	2014	—	—N/a	Photographer
"Gray" (featuring Brother Su)	2014	—	—N/a	Photographer
"6 to 9" (featuring Loco)	2014	— (Note: "6 to 9" did not enter the Circle Digital Chart, but it peaked at number 82 on the component Download Chart.)	KOR: 19,023	Photographer
"Pretty Woman" (예쁜여자)	2014	—	—N/a	Photographer
"Somebody" (featuring Paloalto, Ugly Duck)	2015	—	—N/a	Photographer
"Little by Little"	2016	—	—N/a	Non-album singles
"Gimme Love"	2016	—	—N/a	Non-album singles
"Together"	2017	—	—N/a	Apartment
"Island" (섬으로 가요) (featuring Oh Hyuk)	2017	—	—N/a	Apartment
"Tree" (나무) (featuring Youra)	2019	95	—N/a	Non-album singles
"Memorize Our Night" (우리의 밤을 외워요)	2019	106	—N/a	Non-album singles
"Dreamed a Dream" (꿈을 꿨어요)	2019	—	—N/a	C
"31"	2020	—	—N/a	Non-album singles
"Get to You" (그날, 우리)	2020	—	—N/a	Non-album singles
"Doesn't Matter" (아무렇지 않은 사람)	2021	112	—N/a	Absence
"Closely Far Away" (가까운 듯 먼 그대여)	2021	59	—N/a	Non-album singles
"No Place to Hide" (숨을 곳 없어요)	2021	— (Note: "No Place to Hide" did not enter the Circle Digital Chart, but it peaked at number 52 on the component Download Chart.)	—N/a	Non-album singles
"Between You and Me" (그대와 잠든 나 사이에)	2022	116	—N/a	Non-album singles
"Diamond"	2022	—	—N/a	Diamond
"Tomorrow" (내일의 우리)	2023	— (Note: "Tomorrow" did not enter the Circle Digital Chart, but it peaked at number 71 on the component Download Chart.)	—N/a	Harmony
"Ta-Ta For Now" (이젠 안녕)	2024	— (Note: "Ta-Ta For Now" did not enter the Circle Digital Chart, but it peaked at number 57 on the component Download Chart.)	—N/a	Non-album singles
"Just As We Were" (그 자리 그대로)	2024	— (Note: "Just As We Were" did not enter the Circle Digital Chart, but it peaked at number 61 on the component Download Chart.)	—N/a	Non-album singles
"Wish 2025"	2024	—	—N/a	Non-album singles
"Come to My Dream" (꿈에 들어와)	2025	— (Note: "Come to My Dream" did not enter the Circle Digital Chart, but it peaked at number 74 on the component Download Chart.)	—N/a	Non-album singles
"Big Bird" (with O3ohn, featuring Youra)	2025	— (Note: "Big Bird" did not enter the Circle Digital Chart, but it peaked at number 88 on the component Download Chart.)	—N/a	Two
"—" denotes releases that did not chart.

== Soundtrack appearances ==
Title	Year	Peak chart positions	Album
Title	Year	KOR	Album
"Dream or Reality"	2017	—	Live Up to Your Name OST
"Simple Words" (간단한 말)	2017	— (Note: "Simple Words" did not enter the Circle Digital Chart, but it peaked at number 77 on the component Download Chart.)	Yellow OST
"Lie"	2017	—	Two Cops OST
"Nothing"	2018	—	Secret Mother OST
"A Word of Apology" (미안하다는 말)	2019	—	The Secret Life of My Secretary OST
"Tree" (Chocolate version)	2019	—	Chocolate OST
"All Night Long" (밤새)	2020	63	She Is My Type webtoon OST
"Happy Ending"	2021	— (Note: "Happy Ending" did not enter the Circle Digital Chart, but it peaked at number 90 on the component Download Chart.)	True Beauty OST
"Empty"	2021	—	Beyond Evil OST
"Romantic Sunday"	2021	97	Hometown Cha-Cha-Cha OST
"Stay"	2021	183	Now, We Are Breaking Up OST
"Peony" (꽃말)	2022	— (Note: "Peony" did not enter the Circle Digital Chart, but peaked at number 61 on the Download Chart.)	Thirty-Nine OST
"Scars Leave Beautiful Trace" (상처는 아름다운 흔적이 되어)	2022	— (Note: "Scars Leave Beautiful Trace" did not enter the Circle Digital Chart, but peaked at number 53 on the Download Chart.)	Alchemy of Souls OST
"Fall In Love" (아름다워요)	2023	—	Our D-Day OST
"Haven" (휴게소)	2023	—	Taxi Driver 2 OST
"Pieces of Clouds" (조각 구름)	2023	—	Like Flowers in Sand OST
"All My Dreams Come True" (내겐 아무 소원 남아있지 않아요)	2024	— (Note: "All My Dreams Come True" did not enter the Circle Digital Chart, but it peaked at number 68 on the component Download Chart.)	Marry My Husband OST
"—" denotes releases that did not chart.

=== Other charted songs ===
Title	Year	Peak chart positions	Album
Title	Year	KOR	Album
"Home Sweet Home"	2017	118	Apartment
"My Whole World" (그대 작은 나의 세상이 되어)	2021	1	Absence

== Filmography ==
=== Television series ===
Year	Title	Role	Notes	Ref.
2021	Emergency	Doctor Cha	Medical Sitcom	

=== Television shows ===
Year	Title	Role	Notes	Ref.
2018	Galaxy		Episode 1–10	
2018	Finding Heros: Geek Tour	Cast	Episode 1–3	
2018–2019	The Fan	Contestant	Episode 1–12	
2023	Super Karaoke Survival: VS	Producer	with Giriboy	

=== Web shows ===
Year	Title	Role	Ref.
2025	Better Late Than Single	Host/Cupid	
2026	Take a Hike!		
