= Teen Troubles =

Studio album by The Black Skirts
- Released: September 15, 2022
- Genres: Indie rock; alternative rock; rock and roll; dream pop; pop-rock; garage rock
- Length: 65:34
- Label: BESPOK
- Producer: The Black Skirts

The Black Skirts chronology
Thirsty (2019)	Teen Troubles (2022)

Teen Troubles is the fifth studio album by South Korean indie rock artist The Black Skirts. The album was released on 15 September 2022. It is the last album of Black Skirts' "Love Trilogy" following Team Baby and Thirsty. The album won the Best Modern Rock Album at the 2023 Korean Music Awards.

== Background ==
The Black Skirts described the album as "This is a love letter from the summer of 1999. And also a story of teenage anxiety, minor heartache, wet dreams of rock and roll encouraged by MTV, and happily wasted youth." He also released the short film Teen Troubles in Dirty Jersey with the release of the album.

== Critical reception ==
Professional ratings
Review scores
Source	Rating
IZM	3/5 stars

Park Soojin of IZM reviewed the album as "Teen Troubles is an album armed with composition and melody suction power, but its expressive power put the brakes on it." The member of the selection committee for the Korean Music Awards Kwon Ikdo described the album as "a bombastic image of art that was burning at the forefront of rock revival."

== Track listing ==
No.	Title	Length
1.	"Flying Bobs"	4:03
2.	"Baptized in Fire" ("불세례")	3:02
3.	"My Little Lambs" ("어린 양")	3:38
4.	"Sunday Girl"	3:10
5.	"Friends in Bed"	2:31
6.	"Cicadas" ("매미들")	4:03
7.	"Garden State Dreamers"	3:40
8.	"Follow You" ("따라갈래")	2:56
9.	"Jersey Girl"	3:33
10.	"Love You the Same"	2:35
11.	"Powder Blue"	3:36
12.	"Electra"	4:35
13.	"Min" ("미는 남자")	4:10
14.	"Jeff and Alana"	2:28
15.	"Ling Ling"	3:50
16.	"John Fry"	5:13
17.	"99%"	3:23
18.	"Our Own Summer"	5:08
