= Jnkyrd =

South Korean electronic rock artist

JNKYRD 정크야드
- Born: Kwon Seong-cheol (권성철); South Korea
- Genres: Indie rock, alternative rock, electronic music, electro-pop
- Occupations: Record producer, singer-songwriter, composer
- Instruments: Synthesizers, percussion, vocals
- Years active: 2014–present

Kwon Seong-cheol (Korean: 권성철; born 1988), better known by his stage name JNKYRD (정크야드), is a South Korean indie rock and electronics musician, singer-songwriter, and record producer. Debuted in 2014, he has been a part of several South Korean alternative music projects, including joining with the indie rock band Hyukoh as a core member and producer since 2020 and the musical supergroup TEAM AAA. He has also produced and written music for mainstream acts, including RM of BTS and the alternative musical collective Balming Tiger.

== Background and career beginnings ==
Seong-cheol was active in the underground electronic music scene, sharing early music on SoundCloud. On December 30, 2014, he debuted under the stage name JNKYRD with the release of the electronic single "Napoleon Carol" (나폴레옹 캐롤). Later, JNKYRD alongside DJ Wooram formed the alternative pop and R&B duo Flat Tires (플랫 타이어스), releasing a self-titled extended play in November 2016. During his time in the early underground indie music scene, JNKYRD met the members of rock band Hyukoh. In 2017, he released song "Taxi", featuring Hyukoh's guitarist, Lim Hyun-jae and in July 2018 when he released the music video for his single "Nice to Meet You" (만나서 반가워), The music video was directed by Hyukoh's visual production team DQM, which featured all Hyukoh members and behind the scene members. Later the same year he would work as sound engineer for Hyukoh's EP "24: How to find true love and happiness".

== Breakthrough career ==
In 2020, rock band Hyukoh brought JNKYRD as production member for their EP "Through Love", however this led to JNKYRD joining Hyukoh as an internal core member, as drummer in-woo took a sudden hiatus for health issues. JNKYRD started to perform with Hyukoh for their 2020 world tour contributing synths, percussion and programming ever since.

In October 2020, JNKYRD worked with Taiwanese synth-pop band Sunset Rollercoaster. JNKYRD, alongside Oh Hyuk, were featured in the music video for the track "Candlelight" (featuring Oh Hyuk) from Sunset Rollercoaster's album "Soft Storm". JNKYRD worked as background actor and production member in the music video, which was produced by the visual team DQM.

On February 9, 2021, JNKYRD released his extended play, "Dorm Stairs". it's single "Varsity", features Oh Hyuk.

On July 21, 2022, JNKYRD released single "BAD TRIP: Dorm Stairs Live", which featured rapper Omega Sapien. Later he released his remix extended play, "Dorm Stairs Remixes". By late 2022 JNKYRD worked as primary composer and arranger for Balming Tiger's vocalist sogumm’s studio album "Precious", alongside arrangements for indie musicians O3ohn and Ji Yoon-hae. JNKYRD also worked as the primary sound supervisor for the Balming Tiger's single "섹시느낌 (SEXY NUKIM)", which featured RM of BTS. JNKYRD's role with Balming Tiger continued into 2023, where he operated as the mixing engineer and video sound supervisor for their track "SOS".

Beginning in 2023, he joined the musical supergroup TEAM AAA. He co-produced the album AAA between Hyukoh and Taiwanese synth-pop band Sunset Rollercoaster. The project developed mostly through songwriting and improvisation camps held across Gapyeong and Jeju Island, South Korea, where JNKYRD described the process as an "all in one room" involving up to ten musicians developing instrumental loops and composing simultaneously. The studio album was released on July 10, 2024, and JNKYRD then did an international world tour alongside other members as a musical supergroup TEAM AAA, which was later released as "AAA LIVE". During promotions, Hyukoh on their official youtube channel uploaded a video titled, "[AAA] Strong Man", where they announced JNKYRD as "JNKYRD from HYUKOH" recognising him as an actual member of the band.

Those songwriting camps later led into his most mainstream project, which was working as primary producer and composer for RM of BTS's album Right Place, Wrong Person, working alongside Oh Hyuk, Tseng Kuo-hung, and Lee In-woo, who were recruited to work on the album and especially on the track "Come back to Me".

Following the conclusion of TEAM AAA, JNKYRD continued his work for Sunset Rollercoaster and Hyukoh. JNKYRD acted as production advisor for the making of Sunset Rollercoaster's album "Quit Quietly"; however for Hyukoh, the band members officially integrated him into core operations, making him the unofficial fifth member. JNKYRD later continued working for Balming Tiger, co-producing Mudd the student's album "LAGEON". Sound Supervisor for Balming Tiger's album "Gongbu".

== Discography ==
=== Extended plays ===
- "Flat Tires (with DJ Wooram as Flat Tires)" (2016)
- "Dorm Stairs" (2021)
- "Dorm Stairs Remixes" (2022)
- "#InMyCellNetWorkService#" (2017)

=== Singles ===
- "Napoleon Carol" (2014)
- Taxi 4WD ( 2017)
- "Nice to Meet You" (2018)
- "BAD TRIP: Dorm Stairs Live" (featuring Omega Sapien) (2022)
- "JNKYRD's Greatest Hits"(2021)
- "Haunting Fall and I Hate Birthday" (2018)
- "Nice To Meet You" (2018)
- "Naaan (Very Korea)" (2018)
- "Jack (ft. Jinbo)" (2015)

== Production and songwriting credits ==
Year	Artist	Song / Album	Role	Notes
2018	Hyukoh	24: How to find true love and happiness	Sound engineer	EP
2020	Hyukoh	Through Love (and remixes)	Production	EP
2020	Sunset Rollercoaster	"Candlelight"	Music video production, background actor	single from Soft Storm
2022	sogumm	Precious	Primary composer, arranger	Album; also featuring 03ohn and Ji Yoon-hae
2022	Balming Tiger	"SEXY NUKIM"	Primary sound supervisor	Single featuring RM of BTS
2023	Balming Tiger	"SOS"	Mixing engineer, video sound supervisor	Single
2024	Hyukoh, Sunset Rollercoaster (TEAM AAA)	AAA	Co-producer, composer	Collaboration album
2024	RM	Right Place, Wrong Person	Primary co-producer, composer	Album
2025	Sunset Rollercoaster	Quit Quietly	Production advisor	Album
2025	Mudd the Student	LAGEON	Co-producer	Album
2026	Balming Tiger	Gongbu	Sound supervisor	Album

== Awards and nominations ==
Year	Award	Category	Nominated work	Result	Ref.
2020	Mnet Asian Music Awards	Song of the Year	"Help" (as production member for Hyukoh)	Nominated	
2023	Korean Hip-Hop Awards	Collaboration of the Year	"Sexy Nukim" (as Sound Supervisor for Balming Tiger ft. RM)	Won	
2024	Ciclope International Festival of Craft	Best Direction	"Lost!" (as Producer & Creative Team member for RM)	Won	
2025	Korean Music Awards	Album of the Year	AAA (as Co-Producer & Composer for TEAM AAA)	Nominated	
2025	Korean Music Awards	Best Modern Rock Album	AAA (as Co-Producer & Composer for TEAM AAA)	Nominated	
2025	Korean Music Awards	Best Modern Rock Song	"Young Man" (as Co-Producer & Composer for TEAM AAA)	Nominated	
2025	Golden Melody Awards	Best Album Producer	AAA (as Co-Producer & Composer for TEAM AAA)	Nominated	
2025	Golden Melody Awards	Best Band	AAA (as core member of TEAM AAA)	Nominated	
2025	Golden Melody Awards	Song of the Year	"Young Man" (as Co-Producer & Composer for TEAM AAA)	Nominated	
2025	Golden Melody Awards	Best Vocal Recording Album	AAA (as Co-Producer & Composer for TEAM AAA)	Won	
2025	Golden Melody Awards	Best Music Video	"Antenna" (as Creative Team member for TEAM AAA)	Won	
2025	Golden Melody Awards	Best Album Design	"AAA" (as Creative Team member for TEAM AAA)	Won	
2025	Seoul Music Awards	Best R&B/Hip-Hop Award	Right Place, Wrong Person (as Primary Producer & Composer for RM)	Won	
