= (1) (album) =

Studio album by Youra
- Released: July 7, 2023
- Genre: Indie pop, vocal jazz
- Length: 24:37
- Label: Self-released

Youra chronology
Gaussian (2021)	(1) (2023)

(1) (Korean: 꽤 많은 수의 촉수 돌기; RR: Kkwae maneun suui choksu dolgi) is the debut studio album by South Korean singer-songwriter Youra. The album was released on 7 July 2023.

== Background ==
(1) started from the dream that Yu-ra had one day, and completed by collecting various landscapes and thoughts that follow between reality and fantasy. She said of her musical philosophy, "I will deal with minor lingering feelings, compassion, and scents in producing songs in the future."

== Critical reception ==
Professional ratings
Review scores
Source	Rating
IZM	3.5/5 stars

Park Soojin of IZM said "(1) is a free and rich record, like adding listeners' interpretation to an empty space." Jung Byeongwook of Music Y described the track Motif (구운듯한 얼굴이 너의 모티프) as "It is a punk in 2023, which evokes the stage of Patti Smith, whose French symbolic poetry blends with the intense Garage band sound." Music critic Seojeongmingab reviewed "The music, which is so spontaneous that it should be called jazz, creates a dreamlike beauty by coordinating with the fantasy world in the lyrics that capture the moment. This is why this album acquires value and meaning."

== Track listing ==
No.	Title	Length
1.	"(Motif)" ("구운듯한 얼굴이 너의 모티프")	2:51
2.	"(Throat)" ("목에게")	2:54
3.	"(Faded)" ("따갑고 부끄러워지는 것")	2:58
4.	"(The Cherry Trees)" ("수풀 연못 색 치마")	2:49
5.	"(He or She)" ("그늘 덮개")	4:10
6.	"(Trapped in the Zoo!)" ("동물원")	3:41
7.	"(Tentacles)" ("허영 깊은 분위기에 실오라기 같은 눈을 가진 자")	2:25
8.	"(I Sing, I've No Shape, I'm Incomplete, and I'm Fly)" ("허무한 허무함의 패턴")	2:49
