= The Black Skirts =

South Korean indie rock musician

- Jo Hyu-il in 2023

Background information
- Also known as: Bryan Cho, Holiday Cho
- Born: Jo Hyu-il
- Origin: Seoul, South Korea
- Genres: indie rock; alternative rock; chamber pop; pop rock; garage rock; dream pop
- Occupations: Musician, singer-songwriter, producer
- Instruments: Vocals, guitar, bass, keyboard and percussion
- Years active: 2008–present
- Labels: Doggy Rich; BESPOK
- Website: Official website

Korean name
- Hangul: 조휴일
- RR: Jo Hyuil
- MR: Cho Hyuil

Stage name
- Hangul: 검정치마
- RR: Geomjeong Chima
- MR: Kŏmjŏng Ch'ima

Jo Hyu-il (Korean: 조휴일; born 1982), better known as The Black Skirts (검정치마), is an indie rock musician based in South Korea. In 2008, he released his debut album, 201, which won Best Modern Rock Album at the 2010 Korean Music Awards. He has since released the albums, Don't You Worry Baby (I'm Only Swimming) (2011), Team Baby (2017),Thirsty (2019) and Teen Troubles (2022). He is one of the prominent artists in the Korean indie scene, who played a major role for the revival of the indie scene in late 2000s, his debut album was later ranked to be in the "Top 100 Korean Popular albums of 2000s". The Black Skirts is also known for his uncompromising artistic integrity and longevity of nearly two decades in an industry dominated by commercial pop groups and trends, leading critics citing him as a seminal and foundational figure of the scene. His music explores themes of love, nostalgia, youth, and taboo subjects, incorporating genres such as alternative rock, pop-punk, chamber pop, and dream pop.

== Background ==
Jo was born in Seoul, South Korea, on December 5, 1982. He moved to the United States when he was 12 years old and grew up in New Jersey. His musical taste was influenced at an early age by what he would learn from American music media such as MTV and Rolling Stone. He was also heavily influenced by Alanis Morissette's Jagged Little Pill and the first album he ever purchased was Michael Jackson's Dangerous. During his childhood in South Korea, Jo learned to play the piano. After moving to New Jersey, he began listening to rock and punk music in middle school, which inspired him to learn the guitar during his high school years. Jo revealed that during his teens and early adulthood, he didn't have clear career goals and only focused on his dream of becoming a musician in a rock band. During his school years, he formed some of his first bands called "The Chosen Rejects" and "Bitter17".

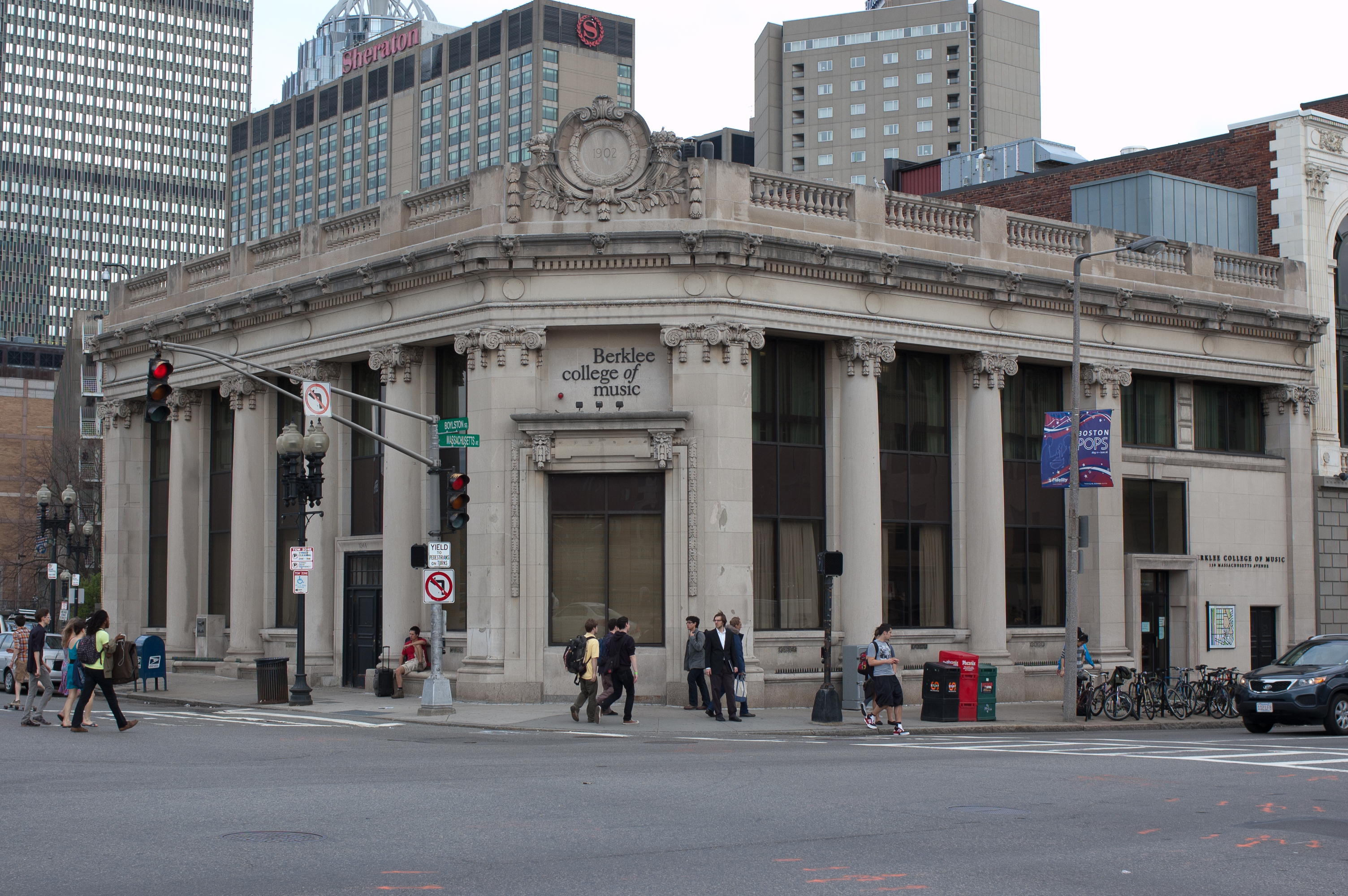
The Berklee College of Music campus in Boston, Massachusetts, where Jo briefly enrolled.

He later enrolled in Boston's Berklee College of Music, only to drop out very shortly with all "F's" as he described. In his early twenties, Jo started to focus on songwriting and music as a serious career path, forming a punk rock trio called "Castel Prayon" in 2004 and touring throughout New York, New Jersey, and Indiana before dissolving 2006. Jo returned to South Korea in 2007 and formed The Black Skirts as a solo project to satisfy his uncompromising artistic integrity while fulfilling his dreams of being in a rock band.

== Career ==
=== Pre-debut ===
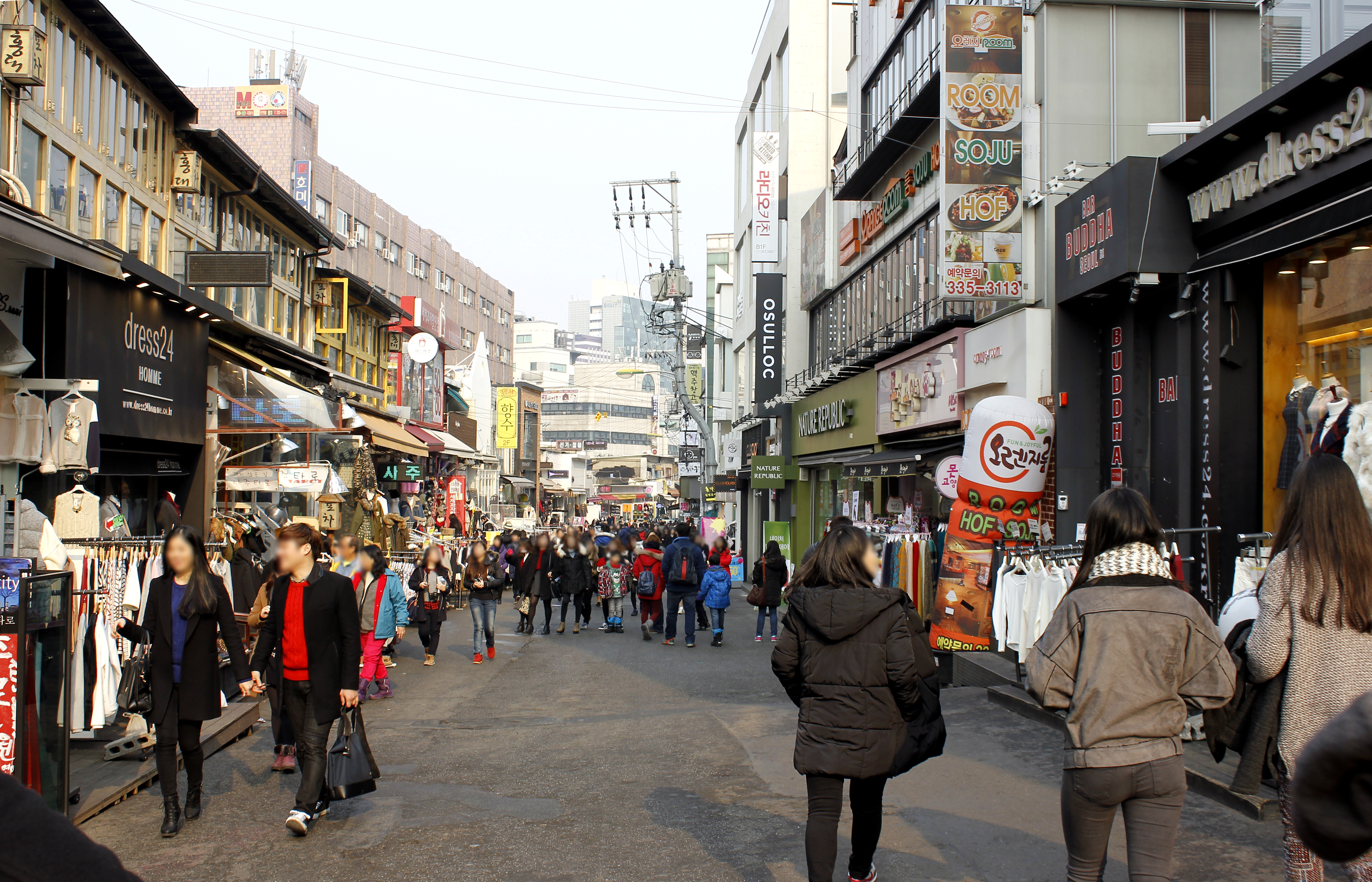
Seoul's Hongdae indie scene where The Black Skirts first attempted to launch his career

Following the dissolution of Castel Prayon, Jo was left broke, leading him to sustain himself through various part time jobs while continuing to write his music. In 2007, he made his entry into the Korean indie scene with submitting a three-track demo EP styled tape for the "Hidden Master" talent search at the Ssamzi Sound Festival but he was rejected in the finale. Jo returned to United States determined to make his album despite not having any proper equipment or money. The groundwork for the album was done between late 2007 and early 2008 where Jo and His producer friend drove across America, "hitting up" on friends at different states on the way while working on the album. The album's recording, mixing and production was later finalized in his basement.

=== 2008-2011: Breakthrough and early days ===
On November 13, 2008, The Black Skirts officially debuted with 201 through independent label Ruby Salon. The album received immediate critical acclaim and commercial success, selling over 10,000 to 30,000 physical copies with his debut being described as "arriving like a comet" to the scene and being one of the key artists for playing a role of revival of the scene after 2005 broadcast incident which largely affected the scene. 201 was later included in Melon's "Top 100 Korean Popular Albums of 2000s".

Critics noted that he introduced many different genres such as garage rock revival, power pop and synth-pop to the domestic scene which is why he was known as the "fronter of the Hongdae indie scene" and "founder of Western styled Korean indie". In 2009, The Black Skirts gained international recognition with becoming one of the first Korean indie artists to perform on Western mainstream media by appearing on Australia's soap opera Neighbours.

Later, in 2009 The Black Skirts released an unofficial album called "My Feet Don't Touch The Ground (And I Am So Winded I Can't Sing For You Today)" which consisted of many lofi demo tracks he wrote early in his career (2003-2008). During the same year, The Black Skirts did an opening act for Seo taiji during the Seoul encore show of the 2009 Seo taiji Band Live Tour of "The Mobius" tour at the Olympics Gymnastics Arena alongside participting Jo Deok-bae's official 25th-anniversary tribute project.

In 2010, The Black Skirts terminated his contract with Ruby Salon, leading him to release "201 (Special edition)" with three new additional tracks with Sony Music Entertainment on March 18, 2010. Later 201 won Best Modern Rock Album at KMA, Jo revealed that the album name "201" is the area code of New Jersey where he lived.

For his 2nd album, released in 2011, Jo purchased a cheap classic guitar from a street vendor and composed his second album "Don't You Worry Baby (I am only Swimming)" in around two-weeks as a form of therapy after his fight with Ruby Salon.

=== 2012-2016: Hiatus, HIGHGRND recruitment, and singles ===
Following the release and promotions of his 2nd album Don't You Worry Baby in 2011, by mid 2013, Jo announced that he would be taking a hiatus. Jo broke his hiatus by releasing single "Hollywood" in 2015.

On January 7, 2016, it was officially announced by HIGHGRND, the independent sub label of YG Entertainment founded and managed by Tablo of Epik High that The Black Skirts has been recruited under their label. Tablo, who had been a long time admirer of The Black Skirts gave The Black Skirts full creative independence and artistic control.

Later under HIGHGRND, The Black Skirts officially released their first singles "EVERYTHING" and "In My City Of Seoul" alongside OST, "Till The End Of Time". In 2017, The Black Skirts announced their 3rd album "Love Trilogy" which would have 3 different parts, each serving a different musical concept and style with the common theme being "Love".

=== 2017-2020: Team Baby, Thirsty, and new label ===
The Black Skirts in 2017.

On May 30, 2017, The Black Skirts released "Love Trilogy" part 1 "Team Baby", which focused on idealized, romantic themes of love and achieved major acclaim and commercial success. In 2018, The Black Skirts did his first collaborative tour called "Love Motel Love" with Taiwanese synth-pop band Sunset Rollercoaster.

Later in 2018, HIGHGRND offically dissolved and was closed. The Black Skirts later re-opened his 2011 label "Doggyrich forever" alongside partner company BESPOK by late 2018.

On February 12, 2019, The Black Skirts officially released "Love Trilogy" part 2, "Thirsty" which focused on darker, taboo themes of love. The album got into several controversies for its themes and lyrics despite its commercial success and major critical support. Thirsty later won Best Modern Rock Album at KMA in 2020.

=== 2021-present: Side projects, Teen Troubles and tours ===
On April 30, 2021, The Black Skirts released their first EP called "Good Luck To You, Girl Scout!", Jo described this EP as "inspired by friends who were dumped last summer by their lovers during corona". In September 2021, The Black Skirts released Japanese version of their 3rd album Team Baby, which marked the first time a Korean indie artist released a full length album in Japanese. In 2022, he collaborated with Taiwanese indie musician Crowd Lu on the song "Dream Like Me".

In September 2022, The Black Skirts released "Love Trilogy" part 3 "Teen Troubles". The Black Skirts described the album as "This is a love letter from the summer of 1999 and also a story of teenage anxiety, minor heartache, wet dreams of rock and roll encouraged by MTV, and happily wasted youth." A short film "Teen Troubles in Dirty Jersey" was released. Teen Troubles later won Best Modern Rock Album at KMA in 2023.

In 2024, The Black Skirts became the first Korean artist to perform a concert in China after 8 years unofficial ban of hallyu wave. Later in 2025, The Black Skirts did his first ever tour in Europe called "Songs To Bring You Home".

The Black Skirts collaborated with Leah Dou in October 2025, on the song "Fruit Fly".

== Artistry ==
Jo has cited American punk and alternative rock acts such as The Smashing Pumpkins, Green Day, Nirvana, Misfits, Rancid, Built to Spill, Weezer, and Ramones as key influences. He was also influenced by South Korean acts such as Seo Taiji, Kim Soo-chul, and No Brain. Jo has stated many times that The Black Skirts' music cannot be described with specific genres or styles as he likes to explore diverse genres and styles of music. During an interview when asked about describing his music, he stated that

"It's the feeling of chasing a butterfly you desperately want to catch all day long until the familiar meadow disappears, leaving you stranded alone in the middle of the forest at dusk. You catch something, only to realize it looks like a moth—yet you hold on to the hope that if you venture a little deeper, you'll catch a beautiful butterfly, even while despairing over the fact that doing so means you'll never find your way back home. More than your scraped knees, your heart is still racing at the thought of catching that butterfly."

— Jo Hyu-il, describing his music

Jo has stated the album "Thirsty" has the most "The Black Skirts-like music" while his album "Teen Troubles" is his personal favourite. Jo writes, composes, arranges, produces and performs vast majority of a instrumental roles himself while using session members.

He takes multi year gaps to work on his albums as he sees them as an artist's true legacy. He maintains a private and low profile status, rarely participating in mainstream spaces and promotions.

== Legacy and impact ==
=== Artists and bands inspired by The Black Skirts ===
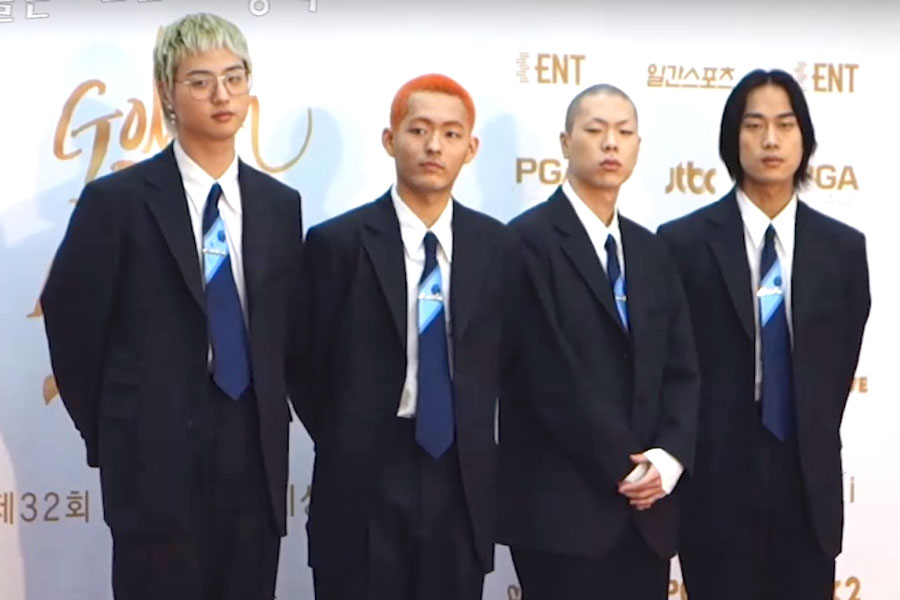
Hyukoh

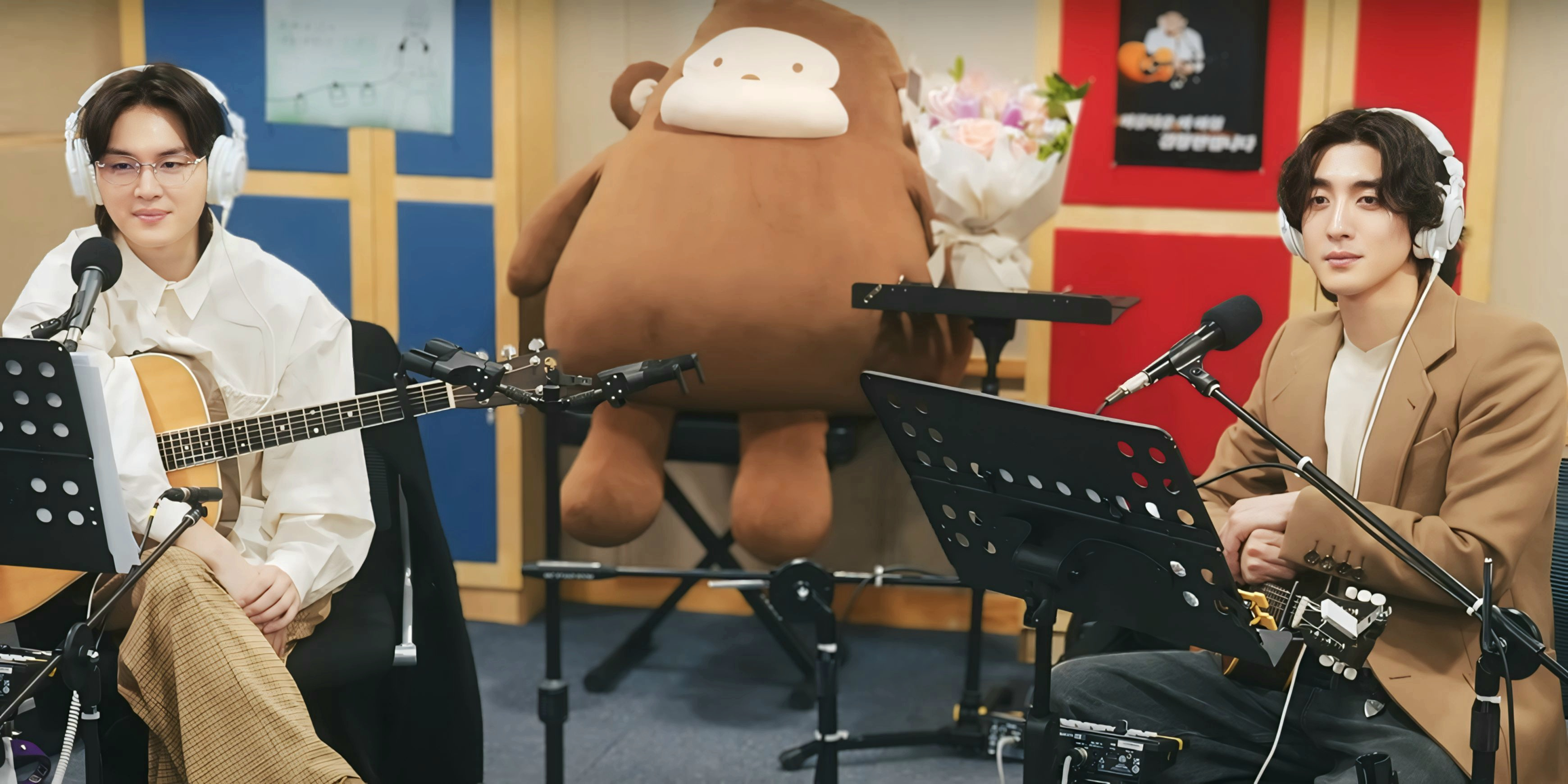
Jannabi

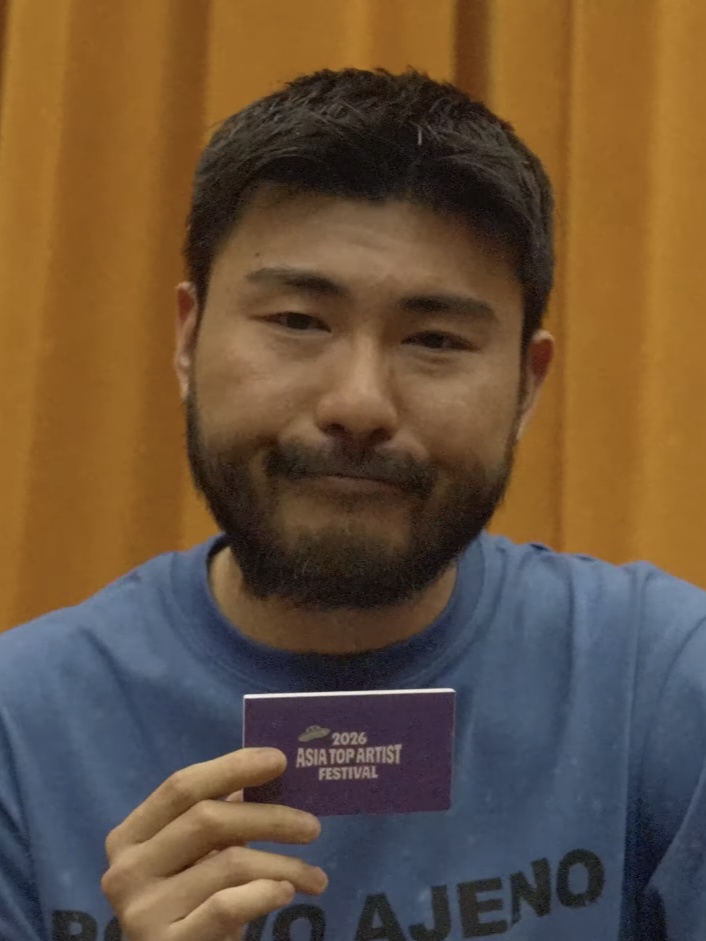
Car, the garden

Indie artists influenced by The Black Skirts

The Black Skirts is widely recognised as the most influential figure of the contemporary scene as he has inspired a generation of musicians of Korean indie and alternative scene, this includes many forefronts of the scene such as Hyukoh, Jannabi, Car, the garden, Hanroro and AKMU. Other artists include Yerin Baek, C Jamm, Nerd Connection, Oohyo, Damon's year, Lee Hee Sang, Why's Young, S-Spilts, Lacuna, The Bowls, Nanomal, Grizzly, Yoon Jun, Hon'z and Juju B. Goode, who have all cited him as influence. The Black Skirts is also highly praised from veteran musicians and mainstream artists such as Yoon Jong-shin, Yoo Hee-yeol, Yangpa, and Jay Park.

=== Critics and acclaim ===
"Jo Hyu-il once stated that the work of artists is to amplify and express emotions. He meant that artists approach their art by saying, 'Even with the smallest wound, dig it up and let it fester to show others, and dance intensely and passionately even when facing the smallest happiness.' As such, The Black Skirts always strives to make the music they want rather than music that appeals to the masses. Although he presented his work piece by piece, over the past five years, Jo Hyu-il has concluded his artistic and creative theories with the equivalent of three studio albums."

— Kim Seong-dae, music critic on "The Black Skirts theory of art for Love Trilogy"

Daebak's publisher Hyun-woo Cho (a prominent industry figure) described The Black Skirts as the "Rosetta Stone" of the scene. Noting that after his debut, younger musicians in the scene treat his music as a guide book. Vice's publisher Tommy Powell described The Black Skirts as the legend of the scene who is "casting a watchful eye over the writhing throngs of future generations". Korean indie's publisher Zuza describes that "His emphasis on storytelling and commitment to the concept is the strongest" noting that The Black Skirts has complex narration skills and musical genres. The KAIST herald's head of cultural division, Min Kim described The Black Skirts' lyrics and style touches parts of human emotions and desires which are difficult for people to admit, making it easy to misunderstand his poetry and philosophy. Many articles have cited The Black Skirts through various titles such as "Godfather of Modern Korean indie", "indie big fish", "unrivaled singer-songwriter representing Korean Indie", "Seoul's indie institution", and several other titles to signify his legacy and influence in the scene.

=== Significance of Love Trilogy ===
The Black Skirts' albums are known for heavily shaping the contemporary Korean indie scene as he popularized, experimented and explored several diverse styles and genres. Following the impact of 201, his "Love Trilogy" albums are considered some of the most influential and experimental Korean indie albums with critics noting that his musical influence can still be heard distinctly in many other artists.

The Black Skirts' album "Team Baby" is credited with popularizing slow-tempo, dream pop-influenced ballads in the Korean indie scene. Team Baby was later included on EBS Space Gonggam's 100 Best Korean Pop Albums of the 2000s alongside 201. Critic Kim Jak-ga compared Team Baby to Yoo Jae-ha's album Because I Love You (사랑하기 때문에), noting that the album set a standard for modern Korean ballads. Conversely, The Black Skirts' fourth studio album Thirsty (2019) is credited with breaking musical and artistic boundaries of the scene through its genre experimentation and lyrics of infidelity and sexual desires. It was praised by critics for its bold uppercut approach, noting that The Black Skirts had moved beyond a band name to become "a genre of its own." Critic Lee Kyung-jun compared The Black Skirts to David Bowie and Nick Cave when discussing his artistry on the album. Kim do-heon of IZM, concluded while talking about the album that "this is why The Black Skirts does not sink and continues to exert influence in the contemporary music world"

The Black Skirts' fifth studio album, Teen Troubles (2022), solidified Jo Hyu-il's influence on the scene, with critics recognizing him as a driving force behind South Korean rock and describing the album as "a bombastic image of art that was burning at the forefront of rock revival." Critics and journalists also noted how it pushed the structural limits of Korean indie releases with an expansive 18 song track-list exploring multiple genres alongside its 16-minute short film.

== Discography ==
=== Studio albums ===
Title	Album details	Peak chart positions	Sales
Title	Album details	KOR	Sales
201 (Special Edition)	Released: March 18, 2010; Label: Sony Music Entertainment Korea; Formats: CD, digital download	9	KOR: 6,194
Don't You Worry Baby (I'm Only Swimming)	Released: July 13, 2011; Label: Sony Music Entertainment Korea; Formats: CD, digital download	3	KOR: 12,484
Team Baby	Released: May 30, 2017; Label: HIGHGRND; Formats: CD, LP, digital download	8	KOR: 10,283
Thirsty	Released: February 12, 2019; Label: BESPOK; Formats: CD, digital download	13	KOR: 14,422
Good Luck to You, Girl Scout!	Released: April 30, 2021; Label: Doggy Rich; Formats: CD, digital download	17	KOR: 2,823
Teen Troubles	Released: September 23, 2022; Label: Doggy Rich, Bespok; Formats: CD, digital download	11	KOR: 17,845

=== Single albums ===
Title	Album details	Peak chart positions	Sales
Title	Album details	KOR	Sales
Hollywood	Released: April 9, 2015; Label: HIGHGRND; Formats: CD, digital download	8	KOR: 2,670
Everything	Released: January 29, 2016; Label: HIGHGRND; Formats: CD, digital download	7	KOR: 1,771
In My City of Seoul (내 고향 서울엔)	Released: March 15, 2016; Label: HIGHGRND; Formats: CD, digital download	5	KOR: 3,000

=== Singles ===
Title	Year	Peak chart positions	Sales	Album
Title	Year	KOR	Sales	Album
As lead artist
"Dientes"	2010	—	—N/a	201
"Love Shine"	2011	92	KOR: 73,803	Don't You Worry Baby (I'm Only Swimming)
"Hollywood"	2015	—	KOR: 15,019	Hollywood
"Everything"	2016	69	KOR: 59,935	Everything
"In My City of Seoul"	2016	—	KOR: 18,781	In My City of Seoul
"Who Do You Love?" (나랑 아니면)	2017	66	KOR: 37,406	Team Baby
"Queen of Diamonds" (섬)	2019	193	—N/a	Thirsty
"Two Days"	2021	—	—N/a	Good Luck to You, Girl Scout!
"Dream Like Me" (with Crowd Lu)	2022	—	—N/a	Non-album single
"My Little Lambs" (어린양)	2022	—	—N/a	Teen Troubles
As featured artist
"You Look Good" (좋아보여) Verbal Jint feat. The Black Skirts	2011	5	KOR: 2,500,000	Go Easy
Soundtrack appearances
"Till the End of Time" (기다린 만큼, 더)	2016	21	KOR: 128,548	Another Miss Oh OST
"Someday" (어떤 날)	2019	—	—N/a	Romance Is a Bonus Book OST
"Ling Ling"	2021	118	—N/a	Yumi's Cells OST
"—" denotes release did not chart.

=== Other charted songs ===
Title	Year	Peak chart positions	Album
Title	Year	KOR	Album
"Antifreeze"	2008	145	201
"1:05" (한시 오분)	2017	106	Team Baby

== Awards and nominations ==
Award	Year	Category	Nominated work	Result	Ref.
Korean Music Awards	2010	Album of the Year	201	Nominated	
Korean Music Awards	2010	Best Modern Rock Album	201	Won	
Korean Music Awards	2010	Song of the Year	"Want Your Love"	Nominated	
Korean Music Awards	2010	Best Modern Rock Song	"Want Your Love"	Nominated	
Korean Music Awards	2010	Best New Artist	—N/a	Nominated	
Korean Music Awards	2012	Album of the Year	Don't You Worry Baby (I'm Only Swimming)	Nominated	
Korean Music Awards	2012	Best Modern Rock Album	Don't You Worry Baby (I'm Only Swimming)	Nominated	
Korean Music Awards	2012	Best Modern Rock Song	"Love Shine"	Nominated	
Korean Music Awards	2017	Best Modern Rock Song	"Everything"	Nominated	
Korean Music Awards	2018	Album of the Year	Team Baby	Nominated	
Korean Music Awards	2018	Best Modern Rock Album	Team Baby	Nominated	
Korean Music Awards	2020	Album of the Year	Thirsty	Nominated	
Korean Music Awards	2020	Best Modern Rock Album	Thirsty	Won	
Korean Music Awards	2020	Best Modern Rock Song	"Queen of Diamonds"	Nominated	
Korean Music Awards	2023	Album of the Year	Teen Troubles	Nominated	
Korean Music Awards	2023	Best Modern Rock Album	Teen Troubles	Won	
MAMA Awards	2022	Best Band Performance	"My Little Lambs"	Nominated	
MAMA Awards	2022	Song of the Year	"My Little Lambs"	Nominated	
