= Oh Hyuk =

South Korean singer (born 1993)

Oh Hyuk 오혁
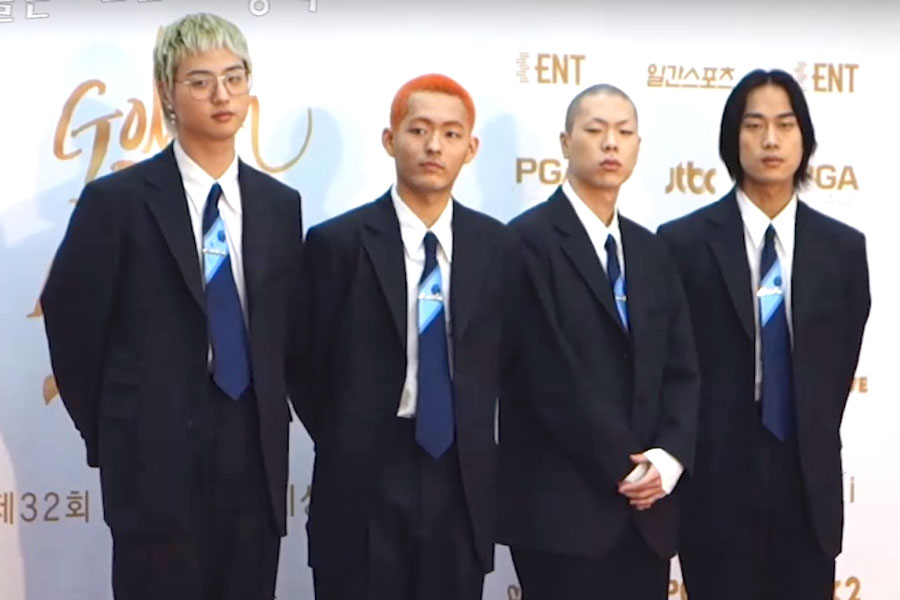
- Oh Hyuk with Hyukoh in 2018 (left to right: Lim Hyun-jae, Lee In-woo, Oh Hyuk and Im Dong-geon)

Background information
- Born: October 5, 1993 (age 33); South Korea
- Genres: Alternative rock; indie rock; R&B
- Occupations: Singer; songwriter; producer; guitarist
- Instruments: Vocals; guitar; percussion
- Years active: 2014–present
- Label: DRDR AC
- Member of: Hyukoh
- Spouse: Hwang Ji-min (m. 2024)
- Website: www.hyukoh.com

Korean name
- Hangul: 오혁
- RR: O Hyeok
- MR: O Hyŏk

Oh Hyuk (Korean: 오혁, born October 5, 1993), stylised OHHYUK, is a South Korean singer and musician best known as the lead vocalist, guitarist and principal songwriter of indie rock band Hyukoh.

== Background ==
Born in South Korea, Oh moved to China when he was five months old with his parents, who were both teachers. His family lived in Yanji, Shenyang, and settled in Beijing. As a result, he speaks Korean, Mandarin Chinese, and English.

In an effort to convince his parents to allow him to pursue music, Oh auditioned for South Korea's three biggest music agencies, S.M. Entertainment, YG Entertainment and JYP Entertainment during summer vacation when he was fifteen. Despite all three companies wanting to sign him, he declined their offers due to differences in musical style.

In 2012, Oh defied his parents' wishes for him to study in the States and moved to Seoul with no financial support to pursue music. He enrolled in art studies at Hongik University, but swiftly dropped out.

=== Musical influences ===
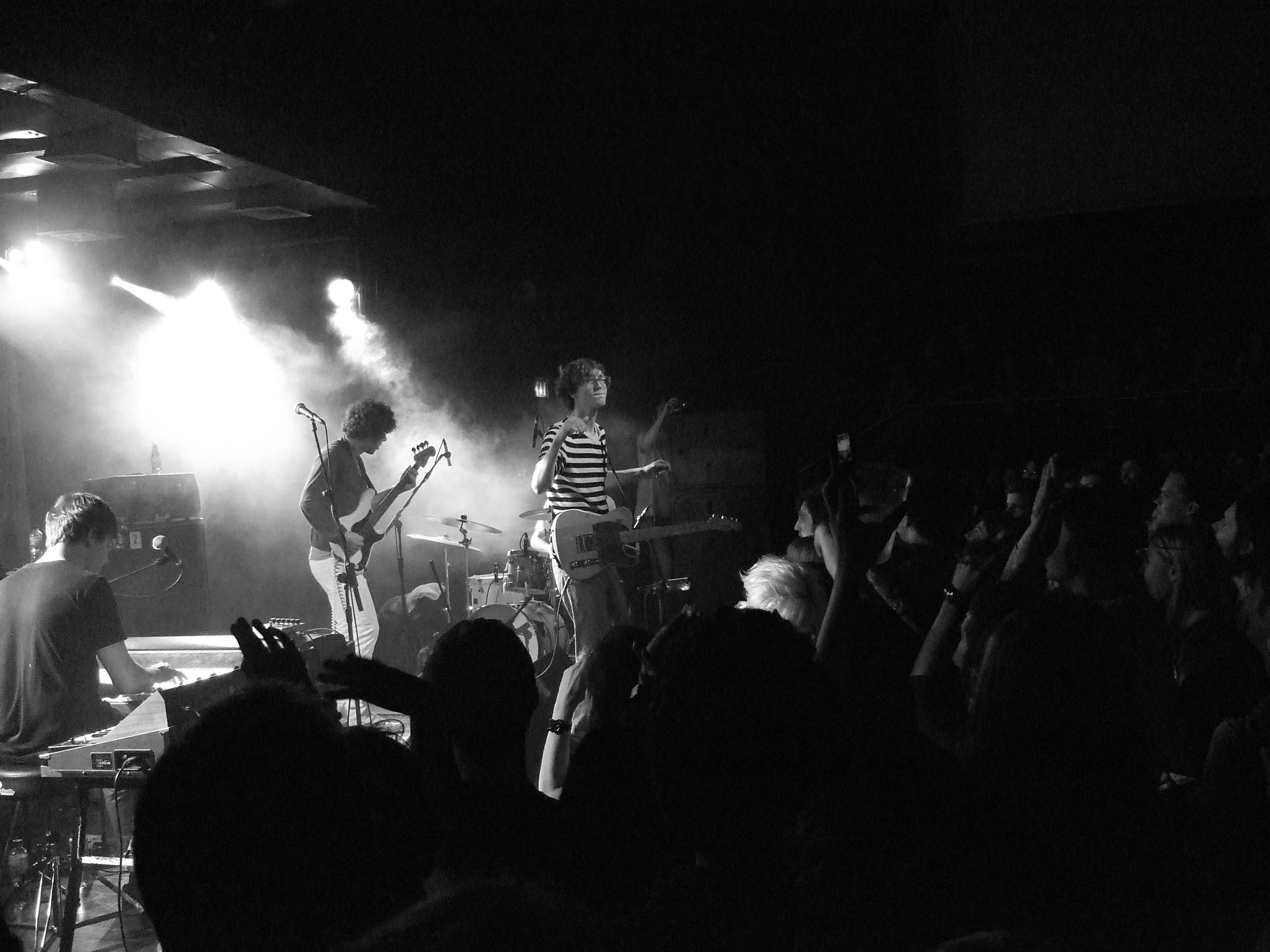
The Whitest Boy Alive

The Black Skirts

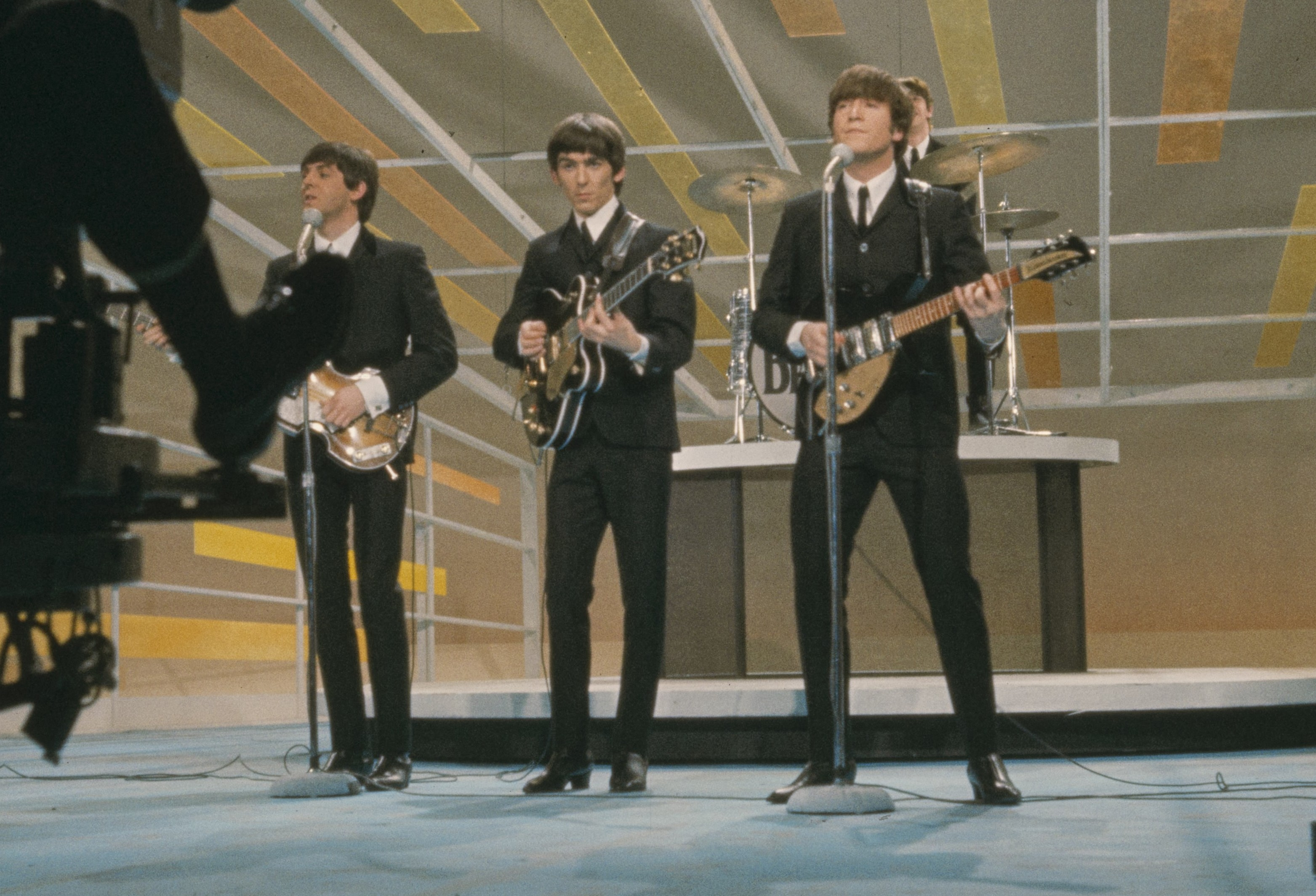
The Beatles

Oh Hyuk's music influences

Oh has cited The Beatles, The Whitest Boy Alive and The Black Skirts as major musical influences. In an interview, he noted that being compared to The Black Skirts was a significant point of pride, recalling that hearing The Black Skirts for the first time gave him the same musical shock he hoped to deliver to his own listeners.

== Career ==
=== Music ===
==== Hyukoh ====
Oh originally created Hyukoh as a one-man band inspired by The Black Skirts, but formed the current four-piece in 2014 under the same name with bassist Im Dong-geon, guitarist Lim Hyun-jae and drummer Lee In-woo. Oh had worked with Lee in the past, having been introduced through Lim, with whom he had attended high school. He met Im through a mutual acquaintance.

The band's first three EPs, 20 (2014), 22 (2015) and 24 (2018); and their first full-length studio album, 23 (2017), were named after the members' ages (all four were born in 1993). They broke with this naming convention in 2020 with the release of their fourth EP Through Love. Oh is credited as a principal songwriter on all their albums.

While the band achieved success in the Korean indie music scene with the release of their EPs, they gained mainstream popularity after participating in the South Korean television program Infinite Challenge. Following the release of 23, the band embarked on their first world tour.

==== Solo Ventures ====
===== Collaborations =====
Oh has collaborated with a variety of South Korean artists across multiple genres, including hip hop group Epik High, singer-songwriter IU, rapper-producer Code Kunst and indie singer Car, the garden. In 2015, Oh and producer Primary collaborated on a four-track EP titled Lucky You!. In January 2018, Oh ventured into the house and techno genre through a collaboration with indie artist Cifika, entitled "Momom" (몸마음).

===== Original soundtrack =====
In 2015, Oh released a cover of Lee Moon-se's "A Little Girl" (소녀) for the soundtrack of the South Korean drama series Reply 1988.

=== Fashion ===
Oh's distinct and "nonconformist" fashion sensibility has set him apart from others in mainstream K-pop and granted him notoriety in the global fashion community. He has been featured in several fashion and lifestyle publications, including Vogue and Elle. After modeling for NikeLab in China in late 2016, he was also featured on the cover of the country's inaugural issue of Dazed magazine. He later became a campaign ambassador for Converse.

Oh's interest in fashion was influenced early on by punk, particularly skate punk, and the aesthetics of Japanese designers.

== Personal life ==
Oh married his girlfriend, model Hwang Ji-min, on December 14, 2024, after dating for over four years.

== Discography ==
=== Single albums ===
Title	Album details	Peak chart positions	Sales
Title	Album details	KOR	Sales
Lucky You with Primary	Released: March 24, 2015; Label: Amoeba Culture, LOEN Entertainment; Formats: CD, digital download	—	—N/a

=== Singles ===
Title	Year	Peak chart positions	Sales (DL)	Album
Title	Year	KOR	Sales (DL)	Album
Collaborations
"Bawling" with Primary	2015	39	KOR: 57,298	Lucky You
"Can't Love You Anymore" with IU	2015	1	KOR: 2,500,000	Palette
"Momom" (몸마음) with Cifika	2018	—	—N/a	Non-album singles
"Yayou Hoi" (야유회) with Sogumm	2020	—	—N/a	Non-album singles
Soundtrack appearances
"A Little Girl" (소녀)	2015	1	KOR: 2,500,000	Reply 1988
"Golden Goat"	2018	—	—N/a	Bad Papa
"2020" with Primary	2021	—	—N/a	D.P.
"—" denotes releases that did not chart.

=== Other charted songs ===
Title	Year	Peak chart positions	Sales (DL)	Album
Title	Year	KOR	Sales (DL)	Album
"eTunnel" with Primary feat. Gaeko	2015	80	KOR: 23,463	Lucky You
"Gondry" (공드리) with Primary feat. Lim Kim	2015	—	KOR: 18,115	Lucky You
"Island" with Primary	2015	—	KOR: 15,725	Lucky You
"—" denotes releases that did not chart.

=== Features ===
Title	Year	Album
"춤 (V*$*V II)" Qim Isle feat. Soul Dive & Oh Hyuk	2014	Non-album single
"Dance (Xin the Shuffle Lover)" Xin Seha feat. Oh Hyuk	2015	24Town
"Rubber" Primary feat. Oh Hyuk	2015	2
"Parachute" Code Kunst feat. Oh Hyuk & Dok2	2015	Muggles' Mansion
"Moonstruck" Peejay feat. Qim Isle & Oh Hyuk	2016	Walkin' Vol. 2
"Island" Car, the Garden feat. Oh Hyuk	2017	Apartment
"Home is Far Away" Epik High feat. Oh Hyuk	2017	We've Done Something Wonderful
"Hemi's Room" Dynamic Duo feat. Oh Hyuk	2018	Off Duty
"Candlelight" Sunset Rollercoaster feat. Oh Hyuk	2020	Soft Storm
"Dorm Stairs" JNKYRD feat. Oh Hyuk	2021	Varsity
"Nabi" Peggy Gou feat. Oh Hyuk	2021	Non-album single
