= Thirsty (The Black Skirts album) =

Studio album by The Black Skirts
- Released: February 12, 2019
- Genres: Indie rock; Art rock; Chamber Pop; Noise rock; Rock opera; Dream pop
- Length: 48:32
- Label: BESPOK
- Producer: The Black Skirts

The Black Skirts chronology
Team Baby (2017)	Thirsty (2019)	Teen Troubles (2022)

Thirsty is the fourth studio album by South Korean indie rock artist The Black Skirts. The album was released on 12 February 2019. Thirsty won the best modern rock album award at the 2020 Korean Music Awards. it is widely cited as one of the most boldest and rarest albums in contemporary korean music history by critics.

== Background ==
Thirsty is the second album in the "love trilogy" of The Black Skirts. He expressed that the album contains the most "The Black Skirts-like music" about what people go through and what they can do, and he released the single Queen of Diamonds (섬) as a teaser before the album's release. Some sexual flagrant lyrics in some tracks on the album caused controversy.

== Critical reception ==
Professional ratings
Review scores
Source	Rating
IZM	4/5 stars

Kim Doheon of IZM reviewed "Having reassured everyone with sweet words, he now brings out his hungry desire, saying, "A black heart just comes out of my mouth." Thirsty is a devastated love, a lively grotesque tragedy." Jeonjainhyeong of Music Y described the album as "Just as Joker is more attractive than Batman and Darth Vader is more attractive than Anakin, the scenery shown by Thirsty is a rare sight in Korean music. This is where The Black Skirts talked about the brazen grotesque, and why he does not sink and continues to exert influence in the contemporary music world."

Publication	List	Rank	Ref.
Music Y	Album of the Year of 2019	8	

== Track listing ==
No.	Title	Length
1.	"Wrong Question" ("틀린질문")	3:15
2.	"Lester Burnham"	2:34
3.	"Island (Queen of Diamonds)" ("섬 (Queen of Diamonds)")	4:47
4.	"Sangsu Station" ("상수역")	3:07
5.	"Mad Dog Diary" ("광견일기")	2:26
6.	"Bollywood"	3:53
7.	"Holiday" ("빨간나를")	4:31
8.	"Put Me on Drugs"	3:36
9.	"Hawaiian Black Sand" ("하와이 검은 모래")	4:16
10.	"Thinner Than Water" ("맑고 묽게")	4:55
11.	"My Shadow" ("그늘은 그림자로")	4:47
12.	"Blood and Thirst (King of Hurts)" ("피와 갈증 (King of Hurts)")	6:25
