= Youra (singer) =

South Korean musician (born 1993)

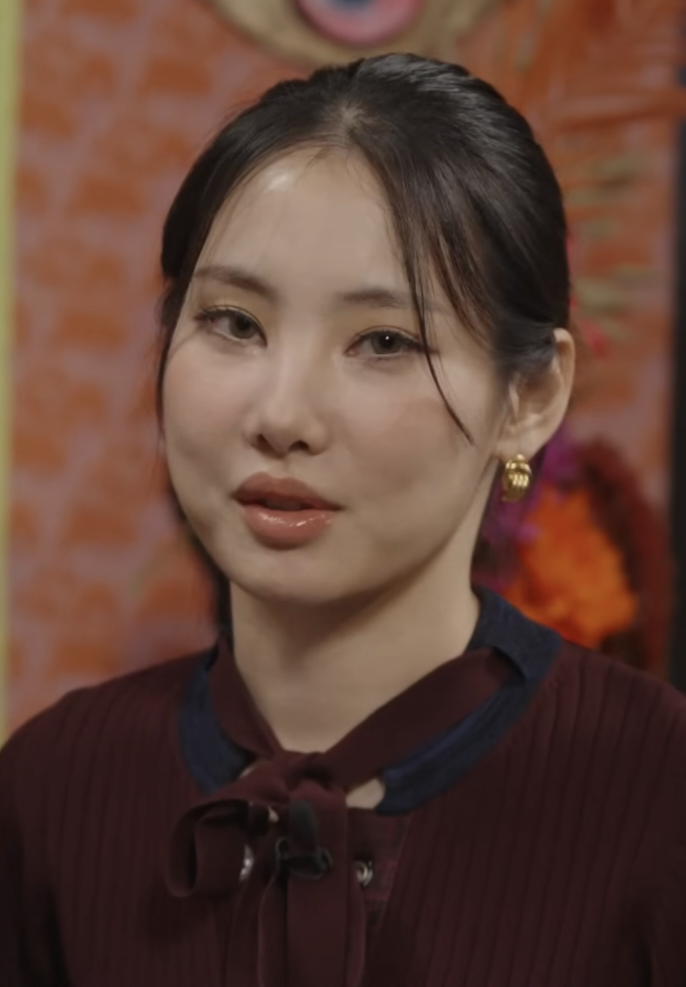
- Youra in March 2024
- Born: Kim You-ra; 17 February 1993 (age 33); Yeosu, South Korea
- Occupation: Singer-songwriter
- Musical career
- Genres: Indie, electronic, R&B, soul, dance
- Years active: 2018-present
- Label: Mun Hwa In (문화인)
- Website: https://www.munhwain.kr/team4-1

Kim You-ra (Korean: 김유라), known mononymously as Youra (Korean: 유라), is a South Korean singer-songwriter signed under Mun Hwa In label. She made her debut as a solo artist on 1 October 2018, with her single, "My".

== Musical career ==
Youra debuted as a solo artist on 1 October 2018, with the song "My". She was a contestant on SBS program The Fan, where she advanced to the fourth round, lasting on eight position before being eliminated from the program.

On 5 March 2019, she released her first EP, named B Side. On 28 July 2020, she released the single "Virus Mix".

On 23 December 2020, she released the single "RAL 9002" (하양), featuring Heize. On 2 February 2021, she released her second EP, named Gaussian, with "Mimi" as the lead single.

On 21 November 2022 she released her third EP titled 'The Vibe is a Chance'. A collaborative effort with Youra on vocals and the instrumentals performed by the band 'Mandong'.

In 2023, she released a new album (1) (꽤 많은 수의 촉수 돌기).

== Discography ==
=== Studio albums ===
- (1) (꽤 많은 수의 촉수 돌기) (2023)

=== Extended plays ===
- B Side (2019)
- Gaussian (2021)
- The Vibe is a Chance (2022)
- A Side (2025)

=== Digital singles ===
==== As main artist ====
- "My" (2018)
- "Dot" (2020)
- "행복은 도피여야 해" ("Happy") (2020)
- "Virus Mix" (2020)
- "하양" («RAL 9002») (2020, featuring Heize)
- "Rawww" (2021)
- "Best regards" (2022)
- "Jungle Bike" (2022)

==== As featured artist ====
- "나의 머리는 녹색 (My Hair Is Green)" (featuring 015B) (2018)
- "Can I Love?" (featuring Cosmic Boy and Meego) (2019)
- "팝콘 (Popcorn)" (featuring Aquinas and Penomeco) (2019)
- "나무 (Tree)" (featuring Car, the Garden) (2019)
- "Risk" (featuring Way Ched) (2019)
- "도쿄 (Towkio)" (featuring Giriboy) (2019)
- "Yay Yay Yay" (featuring Kirin) (2019)
- "염색 (Color)" (featuring GroovyRoom & Leellamarz) (2019)
- "Sadderday" (featuring Owen Ovadoz and Hyngsn) (2019)
- "Winter" (featuring Cosmic Boy) (2020)
- "인간중독 (Human Addict)" (featuring Leellamarz & Toil) (2020)
- "그래왔던것처럼 (Used To)" (featuring George (죠지) and Cosmic Boy) (2020)

=== Collaborations ===
- "New Edition 03" (with 015B) (2018)
- "New Edition 13" (with 015B) (2019)

=== Soundtracks ===
- Into the Ring OST Part.2 - "New Direction" (2020)
- Law and the City OST - "I Want to Know" (2025)

=== Other releases ===
- "Carpet My Heart For You" (2018)
- "수영해 (Swim)" (2019)
- "You" (2019)

== Awards and nominations ==
Year	Award-giving body	Category	Nominated work	Result	Ref.
Korean Music Awards	2024	Best R&B Soul Song	Motif	Won	
