= Team Baby =

Studio album by The Black Skirts
- Released: May 30, 2017
- Genre: Indie rock • Modern rock • Pop rock • Chamber Pop
- Length: 40:42
- Label: HIGHGRND
- Producers: Kim Seongsoo, The Black Skirts

The Black Skirts chronology
Don't You Worry Baby (I'm Only Swimming) (2011)	Team Baby (2017)	Thirsty (2019)

Team Baby is the third studio album by South Korean rock musician The Black Skirts. Released on 30 May 2017, Team Baby was nominated for a Album of the Year at the 2018 Korean Music Awards. it is widely recognized as a highly influential and commercially successful korean indie album. The album is credited with bridging korean indie music with mainstream audiences as it popularized its genre and style across South Korea and the global indie music scene.

== Background ==
In 2016, The Black Skirts signed with label HIGHGRND, where Tablo is the owner. The album cover is a wedding photo of his parents, and The Black Skirts described the album as "going to be a very mature album."

== Critical reception ==
Professional ratings
Review scores
Source	Rating
IZM	3/5 stars

Park Sangjoon of Music Y said "It's hard to pick only the best one song in Team Baby. As such, all songs are beautiful and boast excellent completeness." Kang Minjeong of IZM reviewed "Despite filling most songs with the theme of common love, the reason why they are not burdened or bitten is because of their unique dry texture."

Publication	List	Rank	Ref.
Music Y	Album of the Year of 2017	3	

== Track listing ==
No.	Title	Length
1.	"That's Not Me" ("난 아니에요")	3:31
2.	"Big Love"	3:59
3.	"Diamond"	4:56
4.	"Love Is All"	3:21
5.	"In My City of Seoul" ("내 고향 서울엔")	3:22
6.	"Confetti and Balloons" ("폭죽과 풍선들")	2:44
7.	"1:05" ("한시 오분")	4:00
8.	"Who Do You Love" ("나랑 아니면")	4:31
9.	"Heya" ("혜야")	5:25
10.	"Everything"	4:53
