= Hyukoh =

South Korean indie band

- Hyukoh in 2018

Background information
- Origin: Seoul, South Korea
- Genres: Alternative rock; Indie rock Psychedelic rock
- Years active: 2014–present
- Labels: DRDR AC; HIGHGRND; Cashmier Records
- Members: Oh Hyuk; Im Dong-geon; Lim Hyun-jae; Lee In-woo; JNKYRD

Hyukoh (Korean: 혁오) is a South Korean indie band signed to DooRooDooRoo Artist Company. The band was formed in May 2014 and consists of leader, singer, and guitarist Oh Hyuk, bassist Im Dong-geon, guitarist Lim Hyun-jae, and drummer Lee In-woo alongside producer and electronics musician JNKYRD, who joined in 2020 and has performed as a core part of the group since, despite not being part of the official lineup.

== Career ==
=== Band formation and rise in underground music scene ===
Frontman Oh Hyuk was raised in several cities across northern China (Jilin, Shenyang and Beijing) for the first twenty years of his life due his parents' profession as university professors. Upon graduating high school in 2012, Oh moved to South Korea on his own to pursue music full-time despite his parents' strong opposition. Oh speaks Mandarin Chinese, Korean and English and his diverse cultural influences are directly reflected in Hyukoh's music, in which he infuses a mix of Korean, Mandarin Chinese and English lyrics.

Im Dong-geon, Lim Hyun-jae, and Lee In-woo joined Oh to form Hyukoh in 2014. Oh was previously producing music as a one-man band under the name Hyukoh, and the members eventually came together and took on the name as the current four-piece band. The members came together largely by chance: Oh had already worked with Lee in the past, and Lim attended high school with Lee. Oh was introduced to Im through a mutual acquaintance.

On September 18, 2014, Hyukoh released their debut EP 20, named after the band members' age at the time. The band experienced moderate success in South Korea, often selling out small-scale venues and gaining a strong following in Hongdae, an area in Seoul known for being the epicenter of South Korea's indie music scene.

=== Rise in mainstream popularity ===
Hyukoh gained mainstream popularity in 2015 after participating in the popular Korean variety program Infinite Challenge; they performed "Wonderful Barn" at Yeongdong Expressway Song Festival with Jung Hyung-don. Positive responses from critics and the public translated into their second EP 22—named after the band members' age at the time—charting in the top ten of the Billboard World Albums Chart two months after its release.

On July 21, 2015, Hyukoh became the first act to sign with independent label HIGHGRND, a subsidiary of Korean media conglomerate YG Entertainment. The following year, they represented Korean indie bands at Strawberry Music Festival in Shanghai and Beijing, performing on April 30 and May 2, 2016. They also performed at the Summer Sonic music festival in Japan in August.

The band released their first studio album, 23, on April 24, 2017. The lead single, "Tomboy", placed second on the Melon digital chart and first on Genie, Bugs!, and Olleh's digital charts not long after its release. The album ranked sixth on Billboard' World Albums Chart in May. Following the release of 23, the band went on their first world tour.

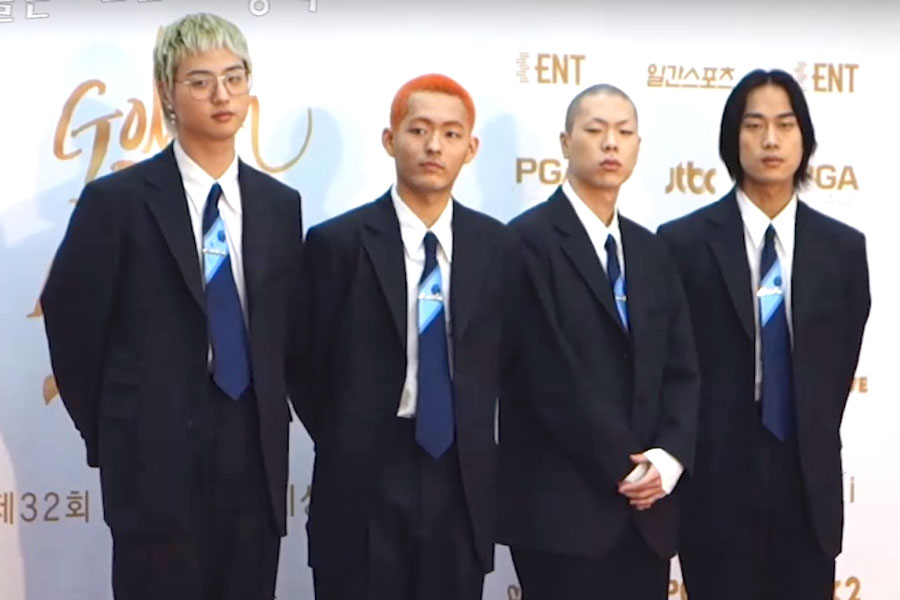
Hyukoh at Golden Disc Awards.

In June 2018, Hyukoh's song "Citizen Kane" was featured in a TV commercial by Apple Inc. for the iPhone X smartphone.

=== 2020 World Tour ===
Hyukoh planned to begin touring in February 2020, with dates slated for shows in Seoul, Asia, Europe, and North America. They were only able to fulfill appearances in Seoul and Japan before the pandemic struck, and the majority of the tour was eventually cancelled due to COVID-19 travel restrictions.

=== Military service ===
Im enlisted on April 20, 2021, in order to carry out his mandatory military service. He was seen off by family, friends, and his bandmates. The location of his training camp and time of entry were not publicized.

=== AAA and integration of JNKYRD ===
In 2024, Hyukoh collabed with Taiwanese synth-pop band Sunset Rollercoaster to release the collaborative album AAA, embarking on an international joint tour.This era marked the full integration of music producer and programmer JNKYRD into the band's core operations.Initially working alongside the band in 2020 after Drummer in-woo's temporary hiatus for anxiety problems,JNKYRD's role expanded over into a multi-instrumentalist fixture, co-producing and arranging including singles "Godspeed!" and "KoK" released on August 18 and 27, 2026.Although the band legally remains registered as a four-piece entity, the founding members and their label frequently present JNKYRD as an internal core member during media promotions, official shoots and broadcasts.

== Musical style ==
Hyukoh has also been recognized for their attention to the band's visual aesthetic, ranging from their music videos to wardrobe choices. The band frequently works with photographer Han Dasom and videographer Jung Dawoon (DQM), who are members of the creative group Dadaism Club. They met in 2014.

Oh has cited The Beatles and The Whitest Boy Alive as major influences in the band's musical style. Oh and guitarist Hyun Jae have cited The Black Skirts as a major influence from korean indie rock. However, after the integration of electronic musician JNKYRD, Hyukoh's musical style shifted more towards avant-garde and psychedelic rock styles.

=== Plagiarism accusations ===
Following their rise to fame, Hyukoh has faced multiple accusations of plagiarism. In 2015, internet users suggested that their song "Lonely" was derived from "1517" by German-Norwegian band The Whitest Boy Alive, while "Panda Bear" was compared to Yumi Zouma's "Dodi". HIGHGRND released a statement on July 24 to address the rumors and stated that Hyukoh had received compliments on "Lonely" from The Whitest Boy Alive frontman Erlend Øye after performing the track as an opener for him while he visited Korea. The label also clarified that "Panda Bear" was released months before Yumi Zouma's "Dodi", making the suspected plagiarism impossible. "Panda Bear" faced further accusations as a copy of American indie band Beach Fossils's "Golden Age". These suspicions were furthered by a now-deleted tweet from Beach Fossils suggesting Hyukoh had mixed "Golden Age" to create "Panda Bear". Oh later posted a screenshot of this tweet to his Instagram account refuting the claims.

== Members ==
- Oh Hyuk (오혁) – vocals, guitar, percussion, songwriter
- Lim Hyun-jae (임현제) – lead guitar
- Im Dong-geon (임동건) – bass
- Lee In-woo (이인우) – drums
- JNKYRD (core member) – producer, programmer, synthesizers, percussion (2020-present)

== Discography ==
=== Studio albums ===
Title	Album details	Peak chart positions			Sales
Title	Album details	KOR	JPN	US World	Sales
23	Released: April 24, 2017; Label: HIGHGRND, DRDR AC, Genie Music; Format: CD, digital download; Track listing: 1. "Burning Youth"; 2. "Tokyo Inn"; 3. "Leather Jacket" (가죽자켓); 4. "Tomboy"; 5. "2002WorldCup"; 6. "Jesus Lived in a Motel"; 7. "Wanli" (Wanli万里); 8. "Die Alone"; 9. "Reserved Seat" (지정석); 10. "Simon"; 11. "Paul"; 12. "Surf Boy"	5	106	6	KOR: 13,830; JPN: 620
AAA (with Sunset Rollercoaster)	Released: July 10, 2024; Label: HIGHGRND, DRDR AC; Format: CD, digital download; Track listing: 1. "Kite War"; 2. "Y"; 3. "Antenna"; 4. "Glue"; 5. "Young Man"; 6. "Do Nothing"; 7. "Aaaannnnteeeeennnaaaaaa"; 8. "2F 年轻人"	18	—	—	KOR: 16,949

=== Live albums ===
Title	Album details	Peak chart positions	Sales
Title	Album details	KOR	Sales
AAA Live (with Sunset Rollercoaster)	Released: May 6, 2025; Label: HIGHGRND, DRDR AC; Formats: CD, digital download, streaming	47	KOR: 1,864

=== Extended plays ===
Title	EP details	Peak chart positions			Sales
Title	EP details	KOR	JPN	US World	Sales
20	Released: September 18, 2014; Label: Cashmier, Sony Music; Format: CD, digital download; Track listing: 1. "Lonely"; 2. "Feels Like Roller-Coaster Ride"; 3. "Ohio"; 4. "Wi Ing Wi Ing" (위잉위잉); 5. "Our Place"; 6. "I Have No Hometown"	—	130	—	JPN: 720
22	Released: May 28, 2015; Label: DRDR AC, LOEN Entertainment; Format: CD, digital download; Track listing: 1. "Settled Down"; 2. "Comes and Goes" (와리가리); 3. "Keunsae" (큰새); 4. "Mer"; 5. "Hooka"; 6. "Gondry" (공드리)	9	112	4	KOR: 2,498+; JPN: 806
24	Released: May 31, 2018; Label: DRDR AC, Stone Music Entertainment; Format: CD, digital download; Track listing: 1. "Graduation"; 2. "SkyWorld" (하늘나라); 3. "Love Ya!"; 4. "Citizen Kane"; 5. "Gang Gang Schiele"; 6. "Goodbye Seoul"	12	—	—	KOR: 6,614+
Through Love	Released: January 30, 2020; Label: DRDR AC; Format: CD, digital download; Track listing: 1. "Help"; 2. "Hey Sun"; 3. "Silverhair Express"; 4. "Flat Dog"; 5. "World of the Forgotten"; 6. "New Born"	8	—	—	KOR: 8,143
"—" denotes releases that did not chart or were not released in that region.

=== Singles ===
Title	Year	Peak positions	Sales	Album
Title	Year	KOR	Sales	Album
"Wi Ing Wi Ing" (위잉위잉)	2014	1	KOR: 2,500,000+	20
"Panda Bear"	2015	95	KOR: 98,706+	Non-album single
"Comes and Goes (와리가리)"	2015	1	KOR: 1,629,519+	22
"Tomboy"	2017	2	KOR: 2,500,000	23
"Leather Jacket" (가죽자켓)	2017	16	KOR: 121,914+	23
"Love Ya!"	2018	46	—N/a	24
"Help"	2020	117	—N/a	Through Love
"Young Man" (with Sunset Rollercoaster)	2024	140	—N/a	AAA
“Godspeed”	2026	—	—	Godspeed

=== Other charted songs ===
Title	Year	Peak positions	Sales	Album
Title	Year	KOR	Sales	Album
"Ohio"	2014	29	KOR: 329,291+	20
"Lonely"	2014	91	KOR: 106,988+	20
"I Have No Hometown"	2014	—	KOR: 83,976+	20
"Feels Like Roller Coaster Ride"	2014	—	KOR: 72,406+	20
"Our Place"	2014	—	KOR: 69,875+	20
"Bamboo"	2015	—	KOR: 54,530+	Non-album single
"Hooka"	2015	10	KOR: 707,634+	22
"Big Bird (큰새)"	2015	37	KOR: 356,608+	22
"Gondry (공드리)"	2015	41	KOR: 279,972+	22
"Settled Down"	2015	83	KOR: 116,937+	22
"Mer"	2015	86	KOR: 112,563+	22
"Die Alone"	2017	36	KOR: 56,122+	23
"Tokyo Inn"	2017	41	KOR: 50,072+	23
"Paul"	2017	61	KOR: 43,144+	23
"Burning Youth"	2017	64	KOR: 39,872+	23
"2002WorldCup"	2017	65	KOR: 39,653+	23
"Jesus Lived In A Motel Room"	2017	68	KOR: 38,543+	23
"Wanli" (Wanli万里)	2017	79	KOR: 35,155+	23
"Surf Boy"	2017	80	KOR: 37,094+	23
"Reserved Seat" (지정석)	2017	84	KOR: 35,803+	23
"Simon"	2017	86	KOR: 35,784+	23

=== Music videos ===
Title	Year	Album
"Wi Ing Wi Ing (위잉위잉)"	2014	20
"Panda Bear"	2015	22
"Comes and Goes (와리가리)"	2015	22
"Hooka"	2015	22
"Gondry"	2015	22
"Leather Jacket (가죽자켓)"	2017	23
"Tomboy"	2017	23
"Wanli (Wanli万里)"	2017	23

== Concerts ==
- 2015 Hyukoh year end concert "22" in Seoul, South Korea
- 2016 Hyukoh year end concert "22" in Seoul, South Korea
- 2017 Hyukoh concert "23" in Kuala Lumpur, Malaysia
- 2017 Hyukoh concert "23" in Seoul, South Korea
- 2017 Hyukoh concert "23" in Hong Kong
- 2017 Hyukoh concert "23" in Singapore
- 2017 Hyukoh concert "23" in Jakarta, Indonesia
- 2017 Hyukoh Europe “Tour”
  - London (Oct. 27, ULU live)
  - Paris (Oct. 29, YOYO Palais de Tokyo )
  - Amsterdam (Nov. 1, Q Factory)
- 2017 Hyukoh North America “Tour”
  - Toronto, ON (Sept. 8, Opera House)
  - Boston, MA (Sept. 10, Middle East)
  - New York City, NY (Sept. 11, Irving Plaza )
  - Vancouver, BC (Sept, 14, Albatross Music Festival)
  - San Francisco, CA (Sept. 15 Social Hall)
  - Seattle, WA (Sept. 17, Columbia City Theater)
  - Los Angeles, CA (Sept. 19, The Mayan)
  - Arcadia, CA (Sept. 23, Modern Sky Festival)
- '24' How To Find True Love And Happiness 2018 'NA'
  - Dallas, TX (Sept. 13, Trees)
  - Austin, TX (Sept. 14, Stubb's Jr)
  - Houston, TX (Sept. 15, White Oak Music Hall)
  - Atlanta, GA (Sept. 17, Terminal West)
  - Washington, DC (Sept. 19, U Street Music Hall)
  - New York City, NY (Sept. 20, Irving Plaza)
  - Philadelphia, PA (Sept. 23, Foundry)
  - Boston, MA (Sept. 24, Paradise)
  - Toronto, ON (Sept. 26, Phoenix Concert Hall)
  - Chicago, IL (Sept. 26, Lincoln Hall)
  - St. Paul, MN (Sept. 29, Amsterdam Bar & Hall)
  - Seattle, WA (Oct. 2, Showbox)
  - Vancouver, BC (Oct. 3, Commodore)
  - Portland, OR (Oct. 4, Doug Fir)
  - Berkeley, CA (Oct. 6, UC Theater)
  - Los Angeles, CA (Oct. 7, The Wiltern)
  - Pomona, CA (Oct. 9, Glass House)
- 2019 '24' How To Find True Love And Happiness - Europe Tour

From February 26, 2019 to March 15, 2019 : European Tour《24: how to find true love and happiness》

  - February 26 : Gorilla, Manchester (UK)
  - February 27 : Electric Brixton, Londres (UK)
  - March 1 : Le Trianon, Paris (France)
  - March 2 : Melkweg, Amsterdam (Netherlands)
  - March 3: Ancienne Belgique, Brussels (Belgium)
  - March 5 : Gloria, Cologne (Germany)
  - March 6 :Kesselhaus, Berlin (Germany)
  - March 7 : Zoom, Frankfurt (Germany)
  - March 9 :Legend Club, Milan (Italy)
  - March 11 : Apolo, Barcelone (Spain)
  - March 12 : Cool Stage, Madrid (Spain)
  - March 13: Capitolio, Lisbon (Portugal)
  - March 15: Izvestia Hall, Moscow (Russia )
- 2019: Coachella Valley Music and Arts Festival ( Sundays 14 and 21 of April)

== Awards and nominations ==
Year presented, name of the award ceremony, award category, recipient of the award and the result of the nomination
Year	Award	Category	Recipient/Nominated work	Result
2015	7th Melon Music Awards	Top 10 Artists	Hyukoh	Won
2015	7th Melon Music Awards	Artist of the Year	Hyukoh	Nominated
2015	7th Melon Music Awards	Album of the Year	22	Nominated
2015	7th Melon Music Awards	Song of the Year	"Comes and Goes"	Nominated
2015	17th Mnet Asian Music Awards	Best Band Performance	Hyukoh	Nominated
2015	17th Mnet Asian Music Awards	UnionPay Song of the Year	"Comes and Goes"	Nominated
2015	Naver Yearly Ranking	Most Downloaded Song	"Wi ing Wi ing"	Won
2016	25th Seoul Music Awards	Performance Culture Award	Hyukoh	Won
2016	30th Golden Disc Awards	Best Rock Band Award	Hyukoh	Won
2016	5th Gaon Chart K-Pop Awards	Discovery of the Year (Indie)	Hyukoh	Won
2016	5th Gaon Chart K-Pop Awards	Popular Singer of the Year	Hyukoh	Nominated
2016	13th Korean Music Awards	Song of the Year	"Comes and Goes"	Nominated
2016	13th Korean Music Awards	Artist of the Year	Hyukoh	Nominated
2016	13th Korean Music Awards	Newcomer of the Year	Hyukoh	Won
2016	13th Korean Music Awards	Best Modern Rock Album	22	Nominated
2016	13th Korean Music Awards	Best Modern Rock Song	"Comes and Goes"	Won
2016	13th Korean Music Awards	Netizen's Artist of the Year	Hyukoh	Nominated
2017	9th Melon Music Awards	Top 10 Artists	Hyukoh	Nominated
2017	19th Mnet Asian Music Awards	Best Band Performance	Hyukoh	Won
2018	32nd Golden Disk Awards	Best Rock Band Award	Hyukoh	Won
2018	15th Korean Music Awards	Musician of the Year	Hyukoh	Nominated
2018	15th Korean Music Awards	Song of the Year	"Tomboy"	Won
2018	15th Korean Music Awards	Album of the Year	23	Nominated
2018	15th Korean Music Awards	Best Modern Rock Album	23	Won
2018	15th Korean Music Awards	Best Modern Rock Song	"Tomboy"	Won
2018	MBC Plus X Genie Music Awards	Song of the Year	"Love Ya!"	Nominated
2018	MBC Plus X Genie Music Awards	Band Music Award	"Love Ya!"	Nominated
2018	MBC Plus X Genie Music Awards	Genie Music Popularity Award	Hyukoh	Nominated
2020	Mnet Asian Music Awards	Best Band Performance	Hyukoh	Nominated
2020	Mnet Asian Music Awards	Song of the Year	"Help"	Nominated
2020	Mnet Asian Music Awards	Worldwide Fans’ Choice	"Help"	Nominated
