= Sunset Rollercoaster =

Band from Taiwan

Background information
- Origin: Taipei, Taiwan
- Genres: Indie rock; Synth-pop; Jazz fusion; Psychedelic rock; Dream pop; Soft rock
- Years active: 2009–2011, 2015–present
- Members: Kuo-Hung Tseng (vocals, guitar); Hung-Li Chen (bass); Shao-Hsuan Wang (keyboard); Tsun-Lung Lo (drums); Hao-Ting Huang (saxophone)
- Past members: Shih-Wei Huang (percussion)
- Website: sunsetrollercoaster.com

Chinese name
- Traditional Chinese: 落日飛車
Transcriptions

Sunset Rollercoaster (Chinese: 落日飛車 Luòrì fēichē) is a 5-piece jazz-influenced synth-pop band from Taipei, Taiwan, consisting of Kuo-Hung Tseng (vocals, guitar), Hung-Li Chen (bass), Shao-Hsuan Wang (keyboard), Tsun-Lung Lo (drums), and Hao-Ting Huang (saxophone)—previously with Shih-Wei Huang (percussion). The name originated from a Photo Booth picture the group had taken for their MySpace profile in 2009, which had a rollercoaster in front of a sunset as the background. The band mostly sings in English, despite being based in a Mandarin-speaking country, which, according to lead singer Kuo Kuo, is to allow them to speak indirectly and allow audiences to discern their own meaning.

== History ==
The idea for the band was inspired by Velvet Underground videos that lead singer Kuo found on the internet. The band formed in 2009 as a trio composed of Tseng Kuo Hung, Kevin Lee, and Lo Zun Long; they released their debut album Bossa Nova in 2011, but then disbanded shortly afterward. Singer Kuo Kuo and drummer Lo Tsun formed another band, Forests, with a different, much darker sound. Sunset Rollercoaster reformed in 2015 and released their second album Cassa Nova in 2018. In 2019, the band released the EP Vanilla Villa, which revolves around the story of an alien who loves a human whom it wants to take to a villa.

The band played at the Summer Sonic music festival in Japan in 2011. After their hiatus, they performed at SummerStage in Central Park, New York City, as part of the Taiwanese Waves music festival in 2017. They recorded a live studio session at Audiotree in 2018, the first Taiwanese band to do so. The band toured North America as part of the "Business Trip Tour" in 2018.

In early 2020, Kuo-Hung Tseng wrote in Los Angeles lyrics for Soft Storm and recorded in part with Ned Doheny. Their 2020 album Soft Storm was named the 4th best album in Asia in 2020 by NME.

They composed 3 songs featured in the anime Sonny Boy. Sunset Rollercoaster collaborated with Hyukoh on the 2024 album AAA, which received seven nominations for the 36th Golden Melody Awards.

== Discography ==
=== Studio albums ===
- Bossa Nova (2011)
- Cassa Nova (2018)
- Soft Storm (2020)
- AAA with Hyukoh (2024)

=== Extended plays ===
- Jinji Kikko (2016)
- Vanilla Villa (2019)

=== Singles ===
- "Villa" (Jerry Paper Remix) (2019)
- "我是一隻魚 I'm a fish" (cover, 2019)
- "Candlelight" (featuring Oh Hyuk, 2020)
- "小薇" (cover, 2021)
- "忘情水" (cover, 2021)
- "Coffee's on Me" (2021)
- "Let There Be Light Again" (2021)
- "滾石40 滾石撞樂隊 40團拚經典 – 愛錯" (cover, 2021)
- "金牛座的牢騷" (cover, 2022)
- "Little Balcony" (2022)
- "Jellyfish" (featuring Michael Seyer, 2022)
- "Impossible Isle" (2022)
- "Levia" (2023)
- "Balloon" (cover/remake, 2023)

== Awards ==
Year	Award	Category	Recipients	Result	Ref.
2018	29th Golden Indie Music Awards	Best Album	Cassa Nova	Nominated	
2018	29th Golden Indie Music Awards	Best Band	Sunset Rollercoaster	Nominated	
2018	29th Golden Indie Music Awards	Best Musician	Tseng Kuo-Hung	Nominated	
2019	30th Golden Melody Awards	Best Music Video	Namso, Youkim ("Slow")	Won	
2019	30th Golden Melody Awards	Best Band	Sunset Rollercoaster	Nominated	
2021	32nd Golden Melody Awards	Best Band	Sunset Rollercoaster	Won	
2025	36th Golden Melody Awards	Best Vocal Recording Album	AAA (HYUKOH & Sunset Rollercoaster)	Won	
2025	36th Golden Melody Awards	Best Music Video	Rafhoo ("Antenna")	Won	
2025	36th Golden Melody Awards	Best Album Design	Chanhee Hong & Na Kim	Won	
